= Wizkid discography =

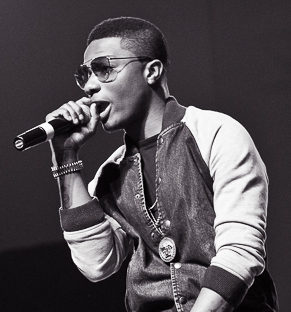
- Wizkid performing in a concert, 2013
- Studio albums: 6
- EPs: 3
- Singles: 54
- Music videos: 35
- Promotional singles: 44

As a solo artist, Nigerian singer-songwriter Wizkid has released six studio albums, three extended play (EP), one video album, fifty singles, thirty-five music videos, and forty-four promotional singles.

Wizkid started his music career at age 11, releasing a seven-track collaborative album with Glorious Five entitled Lil Prinz. In 2009 he was signed to Empire Mates Entertainment. He released his debut album Superstar in 2011, with singles: "Love My Baby", "Pakurumo", "Tease Me/Bad Guys", "Don't Dull" and "Holla at Your Boy". Wizkid was one of the lead artists of the compilation album Empire Mates State of Mind. His second studio album, Ayo, was released on 17 September 2014 and his third studio album, Sounds from the Other Side, was released in 2017, and it was Wizkid's first entry into international charts including the Billboard 200 and UK Albums Chart. In 2020 he released his fourth album, Made in Lagos, which received critical acclaim as well as listed at No. 10 on Spotify. Made in Lagos contains the single "Essence", which became the first Nigerian song to chart on the Billboard Hot 100.

Between 2019 and 2020, Wizkid featured in Beyoncé's projects The Lion King: The Gift and Black Is King, and won a Grammy Award with the collaboration "Brown Skin Girl". He has collaborated with international and local acts such as Bracket, Angel, Lynxxx, Iyanya, Wande Coal, Ice Prince, R2Bees, Wale, Young Jeezy, Omah Lay, among others.

== Albums ==
=== Studio albums ===
List of studio albums, with selected chart positions
Title	Album details	Peak chart positions								Certifications
Title	Album details	BEL (FL)	BEL (WA)	CAN	FRA	NLD	SWI	UK	US	Certifications
Superstar	Released: 12 June 2011; Label: EME; Format: CD, digital download	—	—	—	—	—	—	—	—	
Ayo	Released: 17 September 2014; Label: Starboy, EME; Format: CD, digital download	—	—	—	—	—	—	—	—	
Sounds from the Other Side	Released: 14 July 2017; Label: Starboy, RCA; Format: CD, digital download, streaming	152	200	58	140	99	—	91	107	
Made in Lagos	Released: 30 October 2020; Label: Starboy, RCA; Format: CD, digital download, streaming	69	86	45	60	33	73	15	28	BPI: Gold; IFPI SWI: Gold; MC: Gold; NVPI: Gold; RIAA: Gold
More Love, Less Ego	Released: 11 November 2022; Label: Starboy, RCA; Format: CD, digital download, streaming	91	157	45	135	30	54	16	59	
Morayo	Released: 22 November 2024; Label: Starboy, RCA; Format: CD, digital download, streaming	170	148	48	—	87	35	14	98	
"—" denotes a release that did not chart or was not released in that territory.

== Extended plays ==
List of extended plays, with selected details
Title	EP details
Soundman Vol. 1	Released: 6 December 2019; Label: Starboy; Formats: CD, digital download, streaming
Soundman Vol. 2	Released: 22 December 2023; Label: RCA; Formats: Digital download, streaming
Real, Vol. 1 (with Asake)	Released: 22 January 2026; Label: Starboy, Giran Republic, Empire; Formats: Digital download, streaming

== Singles ==
=== As lead artist ===
List of singles as lead artist, with selected chart positions and certifications
Title	Year	Peak chart positions							Certifications	Album
Title	Year	CAN	NZ	SWI	UK	US	US R&B/HH	WW	Certifications	Album
"Holla at Your Boy"	2010	—	—	—	—	—	—	—		Superstar
"Tease Me/Bad Guys"	2010	—	—	—	—	—	—	—		Superstar
"Don't Dull"	2010	—	—	—	—	—	—	—		Superstar
"Love My Baby"	2011	—	—	—	—	—	—	—		Superstar
"Pakurumo"	2011	—	—	—	—	—	—	—		Superstar
"Oluwa Lo Ni"	2012	—	—	—	—	—	—	—		Superstar
"Jaiye Jaiye" (featuring Femi Kuti)	2013	—	—	—	—	—	—	—		Ayo
"On Top Your Matter"	2013	—	—	—	—	—	—	—		Ayo
"Eledumare"	2013	—	—	—	—	—	—	—		Non-album single
"One Question" (featuring Yemi Sax)	2014	—	—	—	—	—	—	—		Ayo
"Joy"	2014	—	—	—	—	—	—	—		Ayo
"Bombay" (featuring Phyno)	2014	—	—	—	—	—	—	—		Ayo
"Show You the Money"	2014	—	—	—	—	—	—	—		Ayo
"Wonder"	2014	—	—	—	—	—	—	—		Non-album singles
"Sound It"	2014	—	—	—	—	—	—	—		Non-album singles
"Expensive Shit"	2015	—	—	—	—	—	—	—		Non-album singles
"Final (Baba Nla)"	2015	—	—	—	—	—	—	—		Non-album singles
"Daddy Yo" (featuring Efya)	2016	—	—	—	—	—	—	—		Sounds from the Other Side
"Sweet Love"	2017	—	—	—	—	—	—	—		Sounds from the Other Side
"Come Closer" (featuring Drake)	2017	54	—	98	58	—	—	—	BPI: Platinum; IFPI SWI: Gold; MC: Platinum; RIAA: Platinum	Sounds from the Other Side
"African Bad Gyal" (featuring Chris Brown)	2017	—	—	—	144	—	—	—		Sounds from the Other Side
"Naughty Ride" (featuring Major Lazer)	2017	—	—	—	—	—	—	—		Sounds from the Other Side
"Everytime" (featuring Future)	2017	—	—	—	—	—	—	—		Non-album singles
"Kana" (with Olamide)	2018	—	—	—	—	—	—	—		Non-album singles
"Energy (Stay Far Away)" (with Skepta)	2018	—	—	—	59	—	—	—	BPI: Platinum; RMNZ: Gold	Non-album singles
"Fever"	2018	—	—	—	—	—	—	—		Non-album singles
"Master Groove"	2018	—	—	—	—	—	—	—		Non-album singles
"Ghetto Love"	2019	—	—	—	—	—	—	—		Non-album singles
"Joro"	2019	—	—	—	—	—	—	—	BPI: Silver; IFPI SWI: Platinum; MC: Gold; RIAA: Gold	Non-album singles
"Escape" (with Akon)	2020	—	—	—	—	—	—	—		Non-album singles
"Smile" (featuring H.E.R.)	2020	—	—	—	—	—	—	—		Made in Lagos
"No Stress"	2020	—	—	—	—	—	—	—		Made in Lagos
"Ginger" (featuring Burna Boy)	2021	—	—	—	67	—	—	—	BPI: Silver; IFPI SWI: Gold; MC: Gold; RIAA: Gold	Made in Lagos
"Essence" (featuring Tems or also Justin Bieber)	2021	30	15	95	16	9	3	28	BPI: Platinum; IFPI SWI: Platinum; MC: 2× Platinum; RIAA: 4× Platinum; RMNZ: 3× Platinum	Made in Lagos
"Mood" (featuring Buju)	2022	—	—	—	—	—	—	—	BPI: Silver; RIAA: Gold; MC: Gold	Made in Lagos
"Bad to Me"	2022	—	—	—	98	—	—	—		More Love, Less Ego
"Piece of My Heart" (featuring Brent Faiyaz)	2024	—	— (Note: "Piece of My Heart" did not enter the NZ Top 40 Singles Chart, but peaked at number 13 on the NZ Hot Singles Chart.)	—	61	—	—	—		Morayo
"Kese (Dance)"	2024	—	—	—	78	—	—	—		Morayo
"Gimme Dat" (with Ayra Starr)	2025	—	—	—	—	—	—	—		Non-album single
"Kai!" (with Olamide)	2025	—	—	—	—	—	—	—		Olamidé
"Dynamite" (with Tyla)	2025	—	— (Note: "Dynamite" did not enter the NZ Top 40 Singles Chart, but peaked at number 18 on the NZ Hot Singles Chart.)	—	—	—	—	—		We Wanna Party
"Jogodo" (with Asake)	2026	—	—	—	73	—	—	120		Real, Vol. 1
"Turbulence" (with Asake)	2026	—	—	—	76	—	—	178		Real, Vol. 1
"—" denotes a release that did not chart or was not released in that territory.

=== As featured artist ===
List of singles as featured artist, with selected chart positions and certifications
Title	Year	Peak chart positions									Certifications	Album
Title	Year	AUS	CAN	FRA	IRL	NZ	SWI	UK	US	US R&B/HH	Certifications	Album
"Fast Money, Fast Cars" (M.I featuring Wizkid)	2008	—	—	—	—	—	—	—	—	—		Talk About It
"Turn by Turn" (Kel featuring YQ and Wizkid)	2009	—	—	—	—	—	—	—	—	—		The Investment
"Omoge You Too Much" (Banky W. featuring Wizkid)	2009	—	—	—	—	—	—	—	—	—		The W Experience
"Good Luvin" (Lynxxx featuring Wizkid)	2010	—	—	—	—	—	—	—	—	—		This is Lynxxx
"My Party" (Jamix featuring Ice Prince, Wizkid, and Kel)	2010	—	—	—	—	—	—	—	—	—		The Lecture
"Omo To Shan" (Olamide featuring Wizkid)	2010	—	—	—	—	—	—	—	—	—		Rapsodi
"Molowo Noni" (Samklef featuring Wizkid, D'Prince, and Ice Prince)	2010	—	—	—	—	—	—	—	—	—		Nonilizing
"Familiarity" (Jayru featuring Wizkid)	2010	—	—	—	—	—	—	—	—	—		Non-album singles
"Shorty" (Gbakx featuring Wizkid)	2011	—	—	—	—	—	—	—	—	—		Non-album singles
"Follow Me" (Yung6ix featuring Wizkid)	2011	—	—	—	—	—	—	—	—	—		Green Light Green & 6ix O'clock
"Good Life" (2Kriss featuring Ice Prince and Wizkid)	2011	—	—	—	—	—	—	—	—	—		Non-album single
"Girl" (Bracket featuring Wizkid)	2011	—	—	—	—	—	—	—	—	—		Cupid Stories
"Gaga" (Durella featuring Wizkid)	2011	—	—	—	—	—	—	—	—	—		Non-album single
"Dance" (R2Bees featuring Wizkid)	2012	—	—	—	—	—	—	—	—	—		Refuse to Be Broke (Da Revolution II)
"No Fronting" (Jiron featuring Wizkid)	2012	—	—	—	—	—	—	—	—	—		Non-album single
"Baddest Boy" (E.M.E featuring Wizkid, Skales, and Banky W.)	2012	—	—	—	—	—	—	—	—	—		Empire Mates State of Mind
"Fine Lady" (Lynxxx featuring Wizkid)	2012	—	—	—	—	—	—	—	—	—		Non-album single
"Dance for Me" (E.M.E featuring Wizkid)	2012	—	—	—	—	—	—	—	—	—		Empire Mates State of Mind
"Get Down Tonight" (E.M.E featuring Wizkid, Skales, and Banky W.)	2012	—	—	—	—	—	—	—	—	—		Empire Mates State of Mind
"Change" (E.M.E featuring Banky W., Wizkid, Skales, Shaydee, Niyola, and DJ Xclusive)	2012	—	—	—	—	—	—	—	—	—		Empire Mates State of Mind
"Beat of Life (Samba)" (Sarz featuring Wizkid)	2012	—	—	—	—	—	—	—	—	—		Non-album singles
"Time Bomb" (Samini featuring Wizkid)	2012	—	—	—	—	—	—	—	—	—		Non-album singles
"Aboki (Remix)" (Ice Prince featuring Sarkodie, Mercy Johnson, Wizkid, M.I & Khuli Chana)	2013	—	—	—	—	—	—	—	—	—		Non-album singles
"The Matter" (Maleek Berry featuring Wizkid)	2013	—	—	—	—	—	—	—	—	—		Non-album singles
"Sexy Mama" (Iyanya featuring Wizkid)	2013	—	—	—	—	—	—	—	—	—		Desire
"Emi Ni Baller (Remix)" (Chidinma featuring Wizkid)	2013	—	—	—	—	—	—	—	—	—		Non-album single
"Slow Down" (R2Bees featuring Wizkid)	2013	—	—	—	—	—	—	—	—	—		Refuse to Be Broke (Da Revolution II)
"Love You" (Maleek Berry featuring Wizkid)	2013	—	—	—	—	—	—	—	—	—		Non-album singles
"New Bounce" (Maleek Berry featuring Wizkid)	2013	—	—	—	—	—	—	—	—	—		Non-album singles
"Murder Dem" (Remix) (Phenom featuring Wizkid)	2013	—	—	—	—	—	—	—	—	—		Non-album singles
"Bad Girl" (Jesse Jagz featuring Wizkid)	2013	—	—	—	—	—	—	—	—	—		Jagz Nation, Vol.1. Thy Nation Come
"Caro" (Starboy featuring L.A.X and Wizkid)	2013	—	—	—	—	—	—	—	—	—		Ayo
"Pullover" (Kcee featuring Wizkid)	2013	—	—	—	—	—	—	—	—	—		Take Over
"For Example" (Remix) (Kayswitch featuring Wizkid and Olamide)	2013	—	—	—	—	—	—	—	—	—		Non-album single
"U Go Kill Me" (Remix) (Sarkodie featuring Wizkid, E.L, Ice Prince & Navio)	2013	—	—	—	—	—	—	—	—	—		Pride
"Eleniyan" (Reminisce featuring Wizkid)	2013	—	—	—	—	—	—	—	—	—		Alaga Ibile
"Won Gbo Mi" (Shaydee and Wizkid)	2013	—	—	—	—	—	—	—	—	—		Non-album single
"The Way" (Phenom featuring Wizkid)	2013	—	—	—	—	—	—	—	—	—		B.R.A
"Number One Lover" (Starboy featuring Wizkid and Shaydee)	2014	—	—	—	—	—	—	—	—	—		Non-album singles
"Boogie Down" (Saeon featuring Wizkid)	2014	—	—	—	—	—	—	—	—	—		Non-album singles
"Ginger" (L.A.X featuring Wizkid)	2014	—	—	—	—	—	—	—	—	—		Non-album singles
"Ojoro Cancel" (D'Prince featuring Wizkid)	2014	—	—	—	—	—	—	—	—	—		Non-album singles
"Gal Bad" (DJ Xclusive featuring D'Prince and Wizkid)	2014	—	—	—	—	—	—	—	—	—		According to X
"Jeje" (DJ Xclusive featuring Wizkid)	2014	—	—	—	—	—	—	—	—	—		According to X
"Feel Me" (Maleek Berry featuring Wizkid)	2014	—	—	—	—	—	—	—	—	—		Non-album singles
"Ojé" (Legendury Beatz featuring Wizkid)	2014	—	—	—	—	—	—	—	—	—		Non-album singles
"Oh! Baby" (Legendury Beatz featuring Wizkid and Efya)	2014	—	—	—	—	—	—	—	—	—		Non-album singles
"Crazy" (Seyi Shay featuring Wizkid)	2014	—	—	—	—	—	—	—	—	—		Seyi or Shay
"Ungowami" (Remix) (Uhuru featuring Wizkid, Donald & Speedy)	2014	—	—	—	—	—	—	—	—	—		Non-album single
"Sisi" (Praiz featuring Wizkid)	2014	—	—	—	—	—	—	—	—	—		Famous
"Don't Cry" (Radio & Weasel featuring Wizkid)	2014	—	—	—	—	—	—	—	—	—		Non-album single
"Burning Down" (Melissa Steel featuring Wizkid)	2015	—	—	—	—	—	—	—	—	—		Non-album single
"Say You Love Me" (LeriQ featuring Wizkid)	2015	—	—	—	—	—	—	—	—	—		The Lost Sounds
"Confam Ni" (Olamide featuring Wizkid)	2015	—	—	—	—	—	—	—	—	—		2 Kings
"Duze" (Uhuru featuring Wizkid)	2015	—	—	—	—	—	—	—	—	—		Non-album singles
"Kabelai" (Pucado featuring Wizkid & K.O)	2015	—	—	—	—	—	—	—	—	—		Non-album singles
"Bend Down Pause" (Runtown featuring Wizkid)	2015	—	—	—	—	—	—	—	—	—		Ghetto University
"So Low" (Magazeen featuring Wale and Wizkid)	2015	—	—	—	—	—	—	—	—	—		Non-album single
"One Life" (Maleek Berry featuring Wizkid)	2015	—	—	—	—	—	—	—	—	—		Non-album single
"Many Men" (Illbliss featuring Wizkid)	2015	—	—	—	—	—	—	—	—	—		Powerful
"Knack Am" (Terry G featuring Wizkid, Phyno and Runtown)	2015	—	—	—	—	—	—	—	—	—		Non-album singles
"Feeling the Beat" (DJ Jimmy Jatt featuring Wizkid)	2015	—	—	—	—	—	—	—	—	—		Non-album singles
"Get No Love" (Radio & Wease, featuring Wizkid)	2015	—	—	—	—	—	—	—	—	—		Non-album singles
"Roll Up (Re-Up)" (Emtee featuring Wizkid and AKA)	2015	—	—	—	—	—	—	—	—	—		Avery
"Nowo E Soke" (CDQ featuring Wizkid and AKA)	2015	—	—	—	—	—	—	—	—	—		Quality
"Soweto Baby" (DJ Maphorisa featuring Wizkid and DJ Buckz)	2015	—	—	—	—	—	—	—	—	—		Non-album singles
"With You (Remix)" (LK Kuddy featuring Wizkid and Yung6ix)	2016	—	—	—	—	—	—	—	—	—		Non-album singles
"Oshe" (Del B featuring Wizkid and Reminisce)	2016	—	—	—	—	—	—	—	—	—		Non-album singles
"Bad" (Tiwa Savage featuring Wizkid)	2016	—	—	—	—	—	—	—	—	—		R.E.D (Deluxe Edition)
"Erima" (LK Kuddy featuring Dr Sid and Wizkid)	2016	—	—	—	—	—	—	—	—	—		Non-album single
"One Dance" (Drake featuring Wizkid and Kyla)	2016	1	1	1	1	1	1	1	1	1	ARIA: 17× Platinum; BPI: 7× Platinum; MC: Diamond; RIAA: Diamond; RMNZ: 9× Platinum; SNEP: Diamond	Views
"Like This" (DJ Henry X featuring Wizkid)	2016	—	—	—	—	—	—	—	—	—		Non-album single
"Mamacita" (Tinie Tempah featuring Wizkid)	2016	—	—	—	83	—	—	45	—	—	BPI: Silver	Youth
"Bamilo" (May D featuring Wizkid)	2016	—	—	—	—	—	—	—	—	—		Non-album singles
"Make We Run?" (CDQ featuring Wizkid)	2016	—	—	—	—	—	—	—	—	—		Non-album singles
"U Don't Know" (Justine Skye featuring Wizkid)	2016	—	—	—	—	—	—	—	—	—		Non-album singles
"More" (R2Bees featuring Wizkid)	2016	—	—	—	—	—	—	—	—	—		Non-album singles
"Good Love" (DJ Maphorisa featuring Wizkid)	2016	—	—	—	—	—	—	—	—	—		Non-album singles
"Tonight" (R2Bees featuring Wizkid)	2016	—	—	—	—	—	—	—	—	—		Non-album singles
"Wine to the Top" (Vybz Kartel featuring Wizkid)	2017	—	—	—	—	—	—	—	—	—		Non-album single
"Body Hot" (Remix) (Praiz featuring Wizkid)	2017	—	—	—	—	—	—	—	—	—		King
"Scrrr Pul Up" (Remix) (Kly featuring Wizkid)	2017	—	—	—	—	—	—	—	—	—		Non-album singles
"Can't Believe" (Kranium featuring Ty Dolla Sign and Wizkid)	2017	—	—	—	—	—	—	—	—	—		Non-album singles
"O Poju" (DJ Spinall featuring Wizkid)	2017	—	—	—	—	—	—	—	—	—		Dreams
"So Nice" (D'Prince featuring Wizkid)	2017	—	—	—	—	—	—	—	—	—		Non-album singles
"Make Sense" (Shaydee featuring Wizkid)	2017	—	—	—	—	—	—	—	—	—		Non-album singles
"Ma Lo" (Tiwa Savage featuring Wizkid and Spellz)	2017	—	—	—	—	—	—	—	—	—		Sugarcane
"Geshomo" (Sound Sultan featuring Wizkid and 2Baba)	2017	—	—	—	—	—	—	—	—	—		8th Wondah
"Yapa" (Remix) (Masterkraft featuring Wizkid, Reekado Banks, and CDQ)	2017	—	—	—	—	—	—	—	—	—		Non-album singles
"Mama" (Tekno featuring Wizkid)	2017	—	—	—	—	—	—	—	—	—		Non-album singles
"Manya" (Mut4y featuring Wizkid)	2017	—	—	—	—	—	—	—	—	—		Non-album singles
"Ooo" (Zingah featuring DJ Maphorisa, Wizkid, and Burna Boy)	2017	—	—	—	—	—	—	—	—	—		Non-album singles
"Oshe" (DJ Jimmy Jatt featuring Wizkid)	2017	—	—	—	—	—	—	—	—	—		Non-album singles
"Bella" (MHD featuring Wizkid)	2018	—	—	—	42	—	57	—	—	—	SNEP: Diamond	19
"Soco" (Starboy featuring Wizkid, Terri, Spotless, and Ceeza Milli)	2018	—	—	—	—	—	—	—	—	—	BPI: Silver; MC: Gold	
"G Love" (Krept & Konan featuring Wizkid)	2018	—	—	—	—	—	—	28	—	—	BPI: Gold	
"Brown Skin Girl" (Beyoncé featuring Wizkid, Saint Jhn, and Blue Ivy Carter)	2019	—	60	—	50	—	—	42	76	27	ARIA: Gold; BPI: Silver; MC: Gold; RIAA: Gold; RMNZ: Gold	The Lion King: The Gift
"I Like" (Kojo Funds featuring Wizkid)	2019	—	—	—	—	—	—	74	—	—	BPI: Silver	Non-album singles
"Sponono" (Kabza de Small featuring DJ Maphorisa, Burna Boy, Wizkid, and Cassper Nyovest)	2021	—	—	—	—	—	—	—	—	—		Non-album singles
"B. d'Or" (Burna Boy featuring Wizkid)	2021	—	—	—	—	— (Note: "B. d'Or" did not enter the NZ Top 40 Singles Chart, but peaked at number 11 on the NZ Hot Singles Chart.)	—	—	—	—		Non-album singles
"Call Me Every Day" (Chris Brown featuring Wizkid)	2022	—	—	—	—	—	—	53	76	20	IFPI SWI: Gold; MC: Gold; RIAA: Gold; BPI: Silver; RMNZ: Gold	Breezy
"Lighter" (A7S featuring David Guetta and WizKid)	2025	—	—	—	—	—	—	—	—	—		Non-album single
"—" denotes items which were not released in that country or failed to chart.

== Promotional singles ==
=== As lead artist ===
List of promotional singles as lead artist
Title	Year	Album
"You Fine"	2009	Non-album singles
"Mamiwata"	2009	Non-album singles
"Wind It" (featuring Silly)	2009	Non-album singles
"Wapa (Be Correct)"	2009	Non-album singles
"Ori Mi" (with Skales)	2010	Non-album singles
"Breaking from the Norm" (with Illbliss, Ice Prince, and Waje)	2011	Non-album singles
"Don't Dull" (Remix) (featuring Akon)	2011	Non-album singles
"Azonto"	2012	Non-album singles
"Sisi Nene"	2012	Non-album singles
"Let's Get This Party Started" (with Tiwa Savage, 2Face Idibia, D'banj, and M.I)	2012	Non-album singles
"Calling You"	2012	Non-album singles
"Thank You"	2012	Non-album singles
"Lagos to Soweto"	2013	Non-album singles
"That's Me" (featuring Paedae)	2013	Non-album singles
"Sweet Potato"	2013	Non-album singles
"Sexy Mama"	2013	Non-album singles
"Talk"	2013	Non-album singles
"Juru"	2013	Non-album singles
"Drop" (featuring Wale)	2013	Non-album singles
"Outro (Love Music)"	2013	Non-album singles
"MTN iPulse Theme Song" (with Praiz, KCee, and Iyanya)	2013	Non-album singles
"Nobody But You" (featuring Wale)	2013	Non-album singles
"Roll It (Remix)" (featuring Akon and Banky W.)	2014	Non-album singles
"Dance Go (Eau de Vie)" (with 2Face Idibia)	2014	Face 2 Face 10.0
"Amin"	2015	Non-album singles
"Shabba" (featuring Chris Brown, Trey Songz, and French Montana)	2016	Non-album singles
"Fool for You"	2017	Non-album singles
"Ghetto Youth"	2017	Non-album singles
"Medicine"	2017	Non-album singles
"Odoo" (with Masterkraft)	2017	Non-album singles
"Craving"	2017	Non-album singles
"Aphrodisiac"	2018	Non-album singles
"Lagos Vibes"	2018	Non-album singles
"Highgrade" (featuring Ty Dolla Sign)	2018	Non-album singles
"Money & Love"	2022	More Love, Less Ego

=== As featured artist ===
List of promotional singles as featured artist
Title	Year	Album
"Feel da Vibe (Leave 'em Alone)" (Teeto Ceemos featuring Wizkid)	2009	Non-album singles
"Formula" (Hakym featuring Wizkid)	2010	Non-album singles
"Salute" (Remix) (Shank featuring Wizkid)	2011	Non-album singles
"Bad Man" (Sarz featuring Wizkid)	2012	Non-album singles
"Where You Dey" (Basketmouth featuring eLDee and Wizkid)	2012	Non-album singles
"That Girl" (Ms. Chief featuring Wizkid)	2012	Non-album singles
"Chilling" (Bigiano featuring Wizkid)	2012	Non-album singles
"Ms. International" (DJ Soupamodel featuring Wizkid, Beenie Man, and Di'Ja)	2012	Non-album singles
"Reppin' for My City" (Kardinal Offishall featuring Wizkid)	2012	Non-album singles
"Lamba" (Remix) (Hakym featuring Wizkid)	2012	Non-album singles
"Nubian Queen (Refix)" (Omo Akin featuring Wizkid and Dammy Krane)	2013	Non-album singles
"Logout" (Hakym featuring Wizkid)	2014	Non-album singles
"You Garrit (Remix)" (Orezi featuring Wizkid)	2014	Non-album singles

== Other charted and certified songs ==
List of other charted songs, showing year released and album name, along with chart positions
Title	Year	Peak chart positions						Certifications	Album
Title	Year	NZ Hot	SA	UK	US	US R&B/HH	WW	Certifications	Album
"Gyrate"	2020	—	—	—	—	—	—	RISA: Gold	Made in Lagos
"Mighty Wine"	2020	—	—	—	—	—	—	RISA: Gold	Made in Lagos
"Reckless"	2020	—	—	—	—	—	—	RISA: Gold	Made in Lagos
"Roma" (featuring Terri)	2020	—	—	—	—	—	—	RISA: Gold	Made in Lagos
"Money & Love"	2022	—	98	—	—	—	—		More Love, Less Ego
"2 Sugar" (featuring Ayra Starr)	2022	38	70	70	—	—	—		More Love, Less Ego
"Forever Be Mine" (Gunna featuring Wizkid)	2025	—	13	46	68	16	111		The Last Wun

== Guest appearances ==
List of non-single guest appearances, with other performing artists, showing year released and album name
Title	Year	Other artist(s)	Album
"Tanker"	2009	Banky W.	The W Experience
"Intoxicated"	2010	Jesse Jagz, Soul E	Jag of All Tradez
"Nonilizing"	2011	Samklef	Nonilizing
"Olofofo"	2011	Ice Prince	Everybody Loves Ice Prince
"On Point"	2011	9ice	Versus
"Never Let You Go"	2012	eLDee	Undeniable
"Prices"	2012	Camp Mulla	Funky Town
"Painting The Town"	2012	D'Prince	Frenzy!
"No More Sleeping On 'Em"	2012	D'Prince	Frenzy!
"Warn Yourself"	2013	Omawumi	Lasso of Truth
"Blown Away"	2013	Angel	About Time
"Kokose"	2013	Sound Sultan	Me, My Mouth & Eye
"Jahs Love Is True"	2013	Burna Boy	L.I.F.E
"Komotion"	2013	Ice Prince	Fire of Zamani
"Pull Over" (Remix)	2013	KCee, Don Jazzy	Take Over
"Surulere" (Remix)	2013	Dr SID, Don Jazzy, Phyno	Siduction
"Emi Ni Baller" (Cuppy Remix)	2014	Chidinma, Illbliss	House of Cuppy
"Mine"	2014	M.I	The Chairman
"Ogede"	2015	Orezi, Timaya	The Gehn Gehn Album
"Kpono"	2015	Wande Coal	Wanted
"Single"	2015	Burna Boy	On a Spaceship
"I Just Want To Thank You"	2015	R. Kelly	The Buffet
"Boom"	2015	Major Lazer, MOTi, Ty Dolla Sign, Kranium	Peace Is The Mission (Extended)
"Exodus"	2016	Omar Sterling	Victory Through Harmony
"Body Bad"	2016	Shaydee	Rhythm & Life
"Undercover Lover"	2017	Legendury Beatz, Mugeez	Afropop 101
"Sundown"	2017	Zara Larsson	So Good
"My Love"	2017	Wale, Major Lazer, Dua Lipa	Shine
"Yakuza"	2017	Fally Ipupa	Tokooos
"The Life"	2017	Jeezy, Trey Songz	Pressure
"Checklist"	2018	Normani, Calvin Harris	Normani x Calvin Harris
"Want"	2018	CDQ	Ibile Mugabe
"Straight from Mars"	2019	R2Bees	Site 15
"Glow in the Dark"	2019	Skepta, Lay-Z	Ignorance is Bliss
"No Lie"	2019	GoldLink	Diaspora
"Danger"	2019	Dadju	Poison ou antidote
"Opo"	2020	2Baba	Warriors
"Hold Me"	2020	The Sarz Academy	Memories That Last Forever
"LV N ATTN"	2021	Lojay, Sarz	LV N ATTN
"System"	2021	Dave	We're All Alone in This Together
"IDG"	2022	Aṣa	V
"Awolowo (Wizkid Remix)"	2022	Boj, Darkovibes	Gbagada Express
"Slow Motion"	2023	Don Toliver	Love Sick
"Link Up"	2023	Metro Boomin, Don Toliver, Beam, Toian	Spider-Man: Across the Spider-Verse (Soundtrack from & Inspired by the Motion Picture)
"MMS"	2024	Asake	Lungu Boy
"Situation"	2025	Maleek Berry	If Only Love Was Enough
"Billionaires Club"	2025	Olamide, Darkoo	Olamidé
"Forever Be Mine"	2025	Gunna	The Last Wun
"Getting Paid"	2025	Sarz, Asake, Skillibeng	Protect Sarz at All Costs
"Big Time"	2025	Odumodublvck	Industry Machine
"Money Constant"	2025	DJ Tunez, DJ Maphorisa, Mavo	South Gidi
"Abangani"	2025	DJ Tunez, DJ Maphorisa, Daliwonga, Madumane	South Gidi
"Fiesta"	2025	DJ Tunez, DJ Maphorisa, Zaba, Zeh McGeba	South Gidi
"Anxious"	2026	Latto, Odeal	Big Mama
"Man on a Mission"	2026	Chris Brown	Brown: The Chocolate Edition
"Oshe"	2026	Wande Coal	King Coal

== Cameo appearances ==
Title	Year	Director
"Lagos Party" (Banky W.)	2009	Kemi Adetiba
"Pop Something" (Dr Sid featuring D'banj)	2010	Walt Banger
"Give It To Me" (D'Prince featuring D'banj)	2010	Sesan
"Very Good Bad Guy" (Sound Sultan featuring Banky W.)	2011	Clarence Peters
"Oleku" (Ice Prince featuring Brymo)	2011	Mex
"Dami Duro" (Davido)	2012	Clarence Peters
"Good Good Loving" (Banky W.)	2013	Clarence Peters
"Finally" (D'banj)	2013	Sesan
"Leg Over" (Mr Eazi)	2017	Teekay

== Covers and freestyles ==
List of covers and freestyles with release date
Title	Year
"No Time" (with Ice Prince)	2011
"It Wasn't Me" ("No Church in the Wild" cover) (with Skales)	2011
"Zombie" (freestyle)	2012
"Ole (Lamba Freestyle)"	2012
"Turn on the Lights" (cover)	2012
"No Worries" (freestyle) (with Dotstar)	2013
"Only Man She Want" (Remix)	2013
"22/16" (freestyle) (with Mugeez)	2014
"Good Times" (Jamie xx Refix)	2015
"Rewind Dat" ("Don't Mind" Refix)	2016
"Pick Up the Phone" (Refix)	2016
"Sweat" ("Doin' It" Refix)	2016

== Music videos ==
List of music videos as lead and featured artist, showing year released and directors
Title	Year	Director(s)
"Follow Me" (Yung 6ix featuring Wizkid)	2011	Bobby Boulders
"Familiarity" (Jayru featuring Wizkid)	2011	Patrick Ellis
"Omo To Shan" (Olamide featuring Wizkid)	2011	DJ Tee
"Oluwa Lo Ni"	2011	Eban Olivier
"Holla at Your Boy"	2011	Banky W. & Patrick Ellis
"Pakurumo"	2011	Clarence Peters
"Molowo Noni" (Samklef featuring Wizkid)	2011	Clarence Peters
"Tease Me/Bad Guys"	2011	Kemi Adetiba
"No Fronting" (Jiron featuring Wizkid)	2012	Patrick Elis
"Girl" (Bracket featuring Wizkid)	2012	Godfather Productions
"Get Down Tonight" (EME featuring Wizkid, Skales, & Banky W)	2012	Moe Musa
"Let's Get This Party Started" (with 2 Face Idibia, D'banj, Tiwa Savage, and M.I)	2012	Clarence Peters
"Baddest Boy" (EME featuring Wizkid, Skales, & Banky W.)	2012	Clarence Peters
"Dance For Me" (EME featuring Wizkid)	2012	Sesan
"Fine Lady" (Lynxxx featuring Wizkid)	2012	Tom Robson
"The Matter" (Maleek Berry featuring Wizkid)	2013	Moe Musa
"Azonto"	2013	Moe Musa
"Sexy Mama" (Iyanya featuring Wizkid)	2013	Sesan
"Slow Down" (R2Bees featuring Wizkid)	2013	Justin Campos
"Caro" (Starboy featuring L.A.X and Wizkid)	2013	Moe Musa
"Pull Over" (Kcee featuring Wizkid)	2013	Clarence Peters
"Bad Girl" (Jesse Jagz featuring Wizkid)	2013	Mex
"On Top Your Matter"	2014	Sesan
"Kokose" (Sound Sultan featuring Wizkid)	2014	Adasa Cookey
"Ginger" (L.A.X featuring Wizkid)	2014	Moe Musa
"Jeje" (DJ Xclusive featuring Wizkid)	2014	Sesan
"Won Gbo Mi" (Shaydee featuring Wizkid)	2014	Jassy Generation
"Bombay" (featuring Phyno)	2014	Patrick Ellis
"Boogie Down" (Saeon featuring Wizkid)	2014	Sesan
"For Example (Remix)" (Kayswitch featuring Wizkid and Olamide)	2014	Patrick Ellis
"Show You The Money"	2014	Patrick Ellis
"In My Bed"	2014	Soto Jose
"Eleniyan" (Reminisce featuring Wizkid)	2014	Mex
