= Clarence Peters videography =

This is a list is of music videos directed by Clarence Peters.

Year	Video	Artist	Ref
2006	"Fuji (Dance)"	Dare Art Alade (featuring Dekunle Fuji and Ikechukwu)	
2008	"Carry Dey Go"	Darey (featuring 2Face Idibia)	
2008	"Street Credibility"	9ice (featuring 2Face Idibia)	
2008	"Shayo"	Durella	
2009	"Oko Won Lode"	Sound Sultan	
2009	"In the Music"	Omawumi	
2009	"Cure My Craze"	Frank D'Nero	
2009	"Ndoli Ndoli (Pt. 2)"	H-Man	
2009	"No Time"	Bracket (featuring P-Square)	
2009	"Photocopy"	9ice	
2009	"Tin Kon Ko"	Plus One	
2009	"Orin"	Adol	
2009	"Oyoyo"	J. Martins	
2009	"Oshamo"	Teeto (featuring Tha Suspect)	
2009	"Fire"	Str8buttah	
2009	"Omo Naija"	Jamix (featuring Terry G, 9ice, and M.I)	
2009	"Commercial Waist"	Charly Boy	
2009	"Catch Fire"	Zaaki (featuring eLDee)	
2009	"Owo Ati Swagger (Remix)"	CartiAir (featuring Dagrin, Eva, Terry Tha Rapman and Gino)	
2010	"Tonight (Omo Ele)"	Ashley Stephanie	
2010	"Dance"	Onos	
2010	"Pray Sotey (Remix)"	The Pulse (featuring Busta Rhymes)	
2010	"Love WanTinTin"	H-Man	
2010	"Obi Mu O (Remix)"	Obiwon (featuring M.I, Illbliss, Blaise and Guchi)	
2010	"Nollywood"	Rraz (featuring Perez)	
2010	"One Love"	Terry G and House of Ginjah	
2010	"2010"	Sound Sultan (featuring M.I)	
2010	"If You Want Me"	Mo'Cheddah	
2010	"My Body"	Suzie	
2010	"Fine Fine Lady"	Mike Anyasodo (featuring Illbliss)	
2010	"Only Me"	2Face Idibia	
2010	"You Know It"	Goldie Harvey (featuring eLDee)	
2010	"Rock You Tonight"	MeSHACK	
2010	"Facebook Love"	Essence (featuring Jaywon)	
2010	"Nobody Test Me"	Jesse Jagz (featuring M.I and Ice Prince)	
2010	"Dem Don Dey Move"	Tha Suspect (featuring Illbliss)	
2010	"Baby I Got It (Money, Money)"	Femi (featuring Eedris Abdulkareem)	
2010	"Remember (Yori Yori Remix)"	Bracket (featuring 2Face Idibia)	
2010	"Jargo"	Jesse Jagz (featuring Jago)	
2010	"Let Me Love You"	Side One	
2010	"Boys Are Not Smiling"	Terry Tha Rapman	
2010	"Respect Me"	eLDee	
2010	"My Model"	Allenian	
2010	"What I Like"	AKAS	
2010	"Jehovah (Da Paper Song)"	Weird MC (featuring Switch)	
2011	"Kolo for You"	Retta	
2011	"I No Mind"	Joe EL	
2011	"Karry Go"	Sledge (featuring Laitan Dada)	
2011	"I Celebrate"	Waconzy	
2011	"Rep 4 Naija"	eLDee, M.I, D'Banj, Naeto C, Sound Sultan, Black Twang, Meaku	
2011	"Too Much Money (Remix)"	Godwon (featuring Sauce Kid and Ikechukwu)	
2011	"Muah Muah"	Bracket	
2011	"So Inspired"	Waje (featuring Muna)	
2011	"Goddy"	Godwon	
2011	"Very Good Bad Guy"	Sound Sultan (featuring Banky W.)	
2011	"Ginjah Me Up"	Overdose	
2011	"Back When"	Davido (featuring Naeto C)	
2011	"Jankoliko"	Chidinma (featuring Sound Sultan)	
2011	"Molowo Noni"	Samklef (featuring Wizkid, Ice Prince, and D'Prince)	
2011	"Don't Touch My Body"	Goldie Harvey	
2011	"I No Send U (All Star Remix)"	Tha Suspect (featuring M.I, Naeto C, Illbliss, Sound Sultan, Vector, Mi Fliss and Ghetto P)	
2011	"Tomorrow"	Retta	
2011	"Me & You"	Bracket	
2011	"Higher"	Capital Hill Viral Series (featuring Phyno, Bossta, Baron G, Big Maxx, and Zee)	
2011	"Better"	Oritse Femi	
2011	"Over N Over"	Beazy (featuring Dr Frabz)	
2011	"Eruku"	Bossta	
2011	"Up & Down"	OJ Smalls (featuring Samklef)	
2011	"We Dey Grind" (featuring Tha Suspect and RQB)	Mode 9	
2011	"Party Don't Stop"	Camp Mulla	
2011	"Addicted"	Camp Mulla	
2011	"5 and 6"	Naeto C	
2011	"Kontrol"	W4	
2011	"Multiply (Remix)"	Phyno (featuring Timaya, M.I, Flavour, and Mr Raw)	
2011	"Angeli"	Vector (featuring 9ice)	
2011	"Celebrate (Ku Le Le)"	K-Baj	
2011	"Not The Girl"	Casey Ed	
2011	"See Me"	Mo'Cheddah (featuring Phenom)	
2011	"Who Goes There"	Presh	
2011	"Mukulu"	Skales	
2011	"Pakurumo"	Wizkid	
2011	"Slide"	Essence	
2012	"Dami Duro"	Davido	
2012	"Sound Track"	May D	
2012	"Kedike"	Chidinma	
2012	"That Stupid Song"	Bez (featuring Praiz)	
2012	"Lowkey"	Flowssick	
2012	"Omo Naija"	Phenom	
2012	"Intoxicated"	Bose Johnson	
2012	"Fineboy Drama"	Papi	
2012	"Oyinbo"	Malcoholic (featuring Flavour)	
2012	"Shuga"^{[b]}	Banky W, Wizkid, L-Tido, and Bon'eye	
2012	"Magician (Remix)"	Ice Prince (featuring Gyptian)	
2012	"Ojoro"	Ajanaku (featuring J. Grills)	
2012	"Ile Ijo"	May D	
2012	"Baddest Boy"	EME (featuring Wizkid, Skales, and Banky W.)	
2012	"Kosi Were"	Mr 2Kay (featuring Ruggedman)	
2012	"Anamachi Kwanu"	Illbliss (featuring Phyno)	
2012	"My Dear"	Dammy Krane	
2012	"Bartender"	M.I and Naeto C	
2012	"Okay"	Ruby	
2012	"Body"	Pheel	
2012	"Who Be Dat"	Addiction	
2012	"Bum Bum"	Timaya	
2012	"Ur Waist"	Iyanya (featuring Emma Nyra)	
2012	"Club Rock"	Durella	
2012	"Ihe Neme"	2Face Idibia	
2012	"Body Hug"	Monica Ogah (featuring Wizboyy)	
2012	"Ijo Sina"	Sina Rambo (featuring Davido)	
2012	"Mo Fe Lo"	JRoc (featuring $parks)	
2012	"Great Nation"	Timi Dakolo	
2012	"Executive"	Taikoon	
2012	"Respect My Hustle"	Taikoon (featuring Ice Prince, Banky W., and Chandon St. Lucas)	
2012	"Sun Mo Mi"	EME (featuring Banky W., Skales, and Shaydee)	
2012	"Alingo" ^{[a]}	P-Square	
2012	"Bad Guy P"	L.O.S	
2012	"Change"	EME (featuring Banky W., Wizkid, Skales, Niyola, and Shaydee)	
2012	"Ghost Mode"	Phyno (featuring Olamide)	
2012	"Fotojenik (Remix)"	Wizboyy (featuring Ikechukwu)	
2012	"Yes/No"	Banky W.	
2013	"Sama"	Classiq	
2013	"Eziokwu"	Lynxxx (featuring Ikechukwu, Illbliss, and Phyno)	
2013	"Take It Up"	P.R.E (featuring 2Face Idibia)	
2013	"I Wish"	Waje	
2013	"Fere (Whistle)"	Lace	
2013	"Kolobi"	Sna-Z	
2013	"TimeLine"	DMI (featuring Dammy Krane)	
2013	"Bunka"	MMM Gang Anthem	
2013	"Irawo"	Seyi Shay	
2013	"Only Human"	Silvastone (featuring Chidinma)	
2013	"Bulu Bala"	Mr Val	
2013	"Sexy Ladies"	Timaya	
2013	"Run My Race"	Burna Boy	
2013	"Emi Ni Baller"	Chidinma (featuring Tha Suspect and Illbliss)	
2013	"Bigger Better Best"	Pucado	
2013	"VIP"	Ice Prince	
2013	"Ada Ada"	Flavour	
2013	"Natural Something"	Sound Sultan	
2013	"Super Saver"	Setty J (featuring D'Prince)	
2013	"Blow My Mind"	Henrisoul	
2013	"Good Good Loving"	Banky W.	
2013	"I Don't Mind"	Sna-Z	
2013	"Overload"	Threat King	
2013	"I Know What You Like"	Toni Tones	
2013	"Durosoke"	Olamide	
2013	"Ochanya"	Ayoola (featuring Phyno)	
2013	"Man of the Year"	Phyno	
2013	"One Kain Love"	Mystro (featuring Chidinma)	
2013	"Azuka"	X-Project	
2013	"Mama Eh"	Sean Tizzle	
2013	"Nghele (Dance)"	Baby Rhymszs	
2013	"Balabala"	Ikechukwu (featuring Wizboyy)	
2013	"Ukwu Nka"	Pucado	
2013	"Imposter" (featuring Kamar)	Pucado	
2013	"A Nom Ebea"	Chee	
2013	"Pullover"	KCee (featuring Wizkid)	
2013	"Eminado"	Tiwa Savage (featuring Don Jazzy)	
2013	"Ife Di Mma"	2Face Idibia and Tony Oneweek	
2013	"Yawa Dey"	Burna Boy	
2013	"All Night"	Ozone	
2013	"Lost in the Moment"	X-Project (featuring Waje)	
2013	"Dance"	Amarachi	
2013	"SOS"	Yung L	
2013	"These Shotz"	Ikechukwu	
2013	"Sweet Like Shuga"	Flavour, KCee, Chidinma, Sound Sultan, professor	
2013	"Olowo Lo Laye"	KaratKid	
2014	"Number One (Remix)"	Diamond Platnumz (featuring Davido)	
2014	"Ifeoma"	Lynxxx	
2014	"Ikwokrikwo"	Flavour	
2014	"Silifa"	Skuki	
2014	"Siwaju"	Waliyah	
2014	"Oshé"	Praiz (featuring Awilo Longomba)	
2014	"Gentleman"	D'Prince (featuring Davido and Don Jazzy)	
2014	"Aye"	Davido	
2014	"Iyawo Mi"	Timi Dakolo	
2014	"Don't Break My Heart"	Cynthia Morgan	
2014	"Parcel"	Phyno	
2014	"Johnny"	Yemi Alade	
2014	"Gallardo" (featuring Davido)	Runtown	
2014	"Forward Ever"	Skuki	
2014	"Mr. Icey"	Sina Rambo (featuring Olamide and Danagog)	
2014	"Lead Me On"	Cynthia Morgan	
2014	"Mena Rush"	CC2	
	"Love You Everyday"	Bebe Cool	

== Notes ==
a.^{1} ^{2} Peters co-directed "Alingo" with Jude Engees Okoye.
b. The song is the theme song for the television series Shuga.
