= 6th Headies Awards =

Nigerian music industry awards

The Headies 2011
- Date: October 22, 2011
- Location: Eko Hotel and Suites; Victoria Island, Lagos
- Country: Nigeria
- Hosted by: Rita Dominic and eLDee
- Most awards: 2Baba (3)
- Most nominations: Ice Prince (6)
- Website: theheadies.com

Television/radio coverage
- Network: HipTV

The Headies 2011 was the 6th edition of the Hip Hop World Awards. The award's name was officially changed to "The Headies". The ceremony was hosted by Rita Dominic and eLDee. It was held on October 22, 2011, at the Eko Hotel and Suites in Victoria Island, Lagos. 2face Idibia won three awards, including Artiste of the Year. Darey's "The Way You Are" won for Best R&B Single and Recording of the Year. M.I and Ice Prince won two awards apiece. Don Jazzy and Dr SID both took home an award. Capital Femi walked away with the Best Vocal Performance (Male) award. Wizkid won the Next Rated category and received a Hyundai Sonata at a later date. Waje was the only female awardee. The Hall of Fame award went to Jùjú musician Shina Peters. A total of twenty-one cart gold plaques were handed out.

== Performers ==
- Olamide
- Waje
- Sound Sultan
- Shina Peters
- Omawumi
- Ice Prince
- Brymo
- M.I
- Dr SID
- Tiwa Savage
- Wizkid

== Winners and nominees ==
Best R&B/Pop Album	Best Rap Album
Turning Point – Dr SID; Beautiful Imperfection – Aṣa; Back To The Future – Sound Sultan; Double Dare – Darey; The Unstoppable International Edition – 2face Idibia (Winner)	Untouchable – Ruggedman; MI2 – M.I (Winner); I Am William – 2Shotz; African American – Sauce Kid; Boys Are Not Smiling – Terry Tha Rapman
Best R&B Single	Best Pop Single
"Only Me" – 2 Face Idibia; "The Way You Are" – Darey (Winner); "I Gat Money" – Capital Femi (featuring Eedris Abdulkareem); "For A Minute" – Waje; "Oyi" (Remix) – Flavour (featuring Tiwa Savage)	"Give It To Me" – D'Prince; "Pop Champaign" – Dr SID (Winner); "Holla at Your Boy" – Wizkid; "Mr Endowed" – D'banj; "Fimile" – Kas
Best Vocal Performance (Male)	Best Vocal Performance (Female)
Darey – "The Way You Are"; Bez – "More You"; Capital Femi – "Money Money Money" (Winner); Timi Dakolo – "There Is A Cry"	Waje – "For A Minute" (Winner); Tiwa Savage – "Kele Kele Love"; Eva Alordiah – "God Hand"; Ego – "Fall In Love"
Best Rap Single	Best Street-Hop Artiste
"Oleku" – Ice Prince (featuring Brymo) (Winner); "Ten Over Ten" – Naeto C; "Boys Are Not Smiling" – Terry Tha Rapman; "Eni Duro" – Olamide; "She and My Swagga" – Ruggedman (featuring Ice Prince)	Samklef – "Noni"; Jahbless (featuring Ice Prince, Durella, Reminisce, and eLDee) – "Joor Oh (Remix)" (Winner); Olamide – "Eni Duro"; Konga – "Kabakaba"; Wizboyy – "Owusagi"
Best Collabo	Lyricist on the Roll
"You Know it" – Goldie (featuring eLDee); "Facebook Love" – Essence (featuring Jaywon); "Joor Oh" (Remix) – Jahbless (featuring Ice Prince, Durella, Reminisce, and eLDee); "Number One" – M.I (featuring Flavour N'abania) (Winner); "Oleku" – Ice Prince (featuring Brymo)	Mode 9 – "Rhyme Tight" (Winner); Ice Prince – "Oleku"; M.I– "Undisputed"; Terry Tha Rapman – "Boys Are Not Smiling"; Vector – "Get Down"
Song of the Year	Best Recording of the Year
"Oleku" – Ice Prince (featuring Brymo) (Winner); "Only Me" – 2 Face Idibia; "Give It To Me" – D'Prince (featuring D'banj); "Pop Something" – Dr SID (featuring D'banj); "Fimile" – Kas	"The Way You Are" – Darey (Winner); "God Hand" – Eva Alordiah; "Rain Drops" – 2 Face Idibia; "Be My Man" – Aṣa
Album of the Year	Artiste of the Year
MI2 – M.I; Back From The Future – Sound Sultan; Turning Point – Dr SID; Beautiful Imperfection – Aṣa; International Edition – 2 Face Idibia (Winner)	Darey; M.I; D'banj; 2 Face Idibia (Winner); Duncan Mighty
Producer of the Year	Best Music Video Director
Don Jazzy – "Over the Moon", "Mr Endowed", and "Pop Champaign" (Winner); Samklef – "Don't Dull", "Kilode", "Jonzing World", and "Noni"; Jay Sleek – "Only Me" and "2010"; Jesse Jagz – "Oleku" and "Jargo"; Cobhams Asuquo – "The Way You Are" and "There Is A Cry"	Patrick Elis – "Holla at Your Boy"; Clarence Peters – "You Know It"; Gini – "Ko Ma Roll"; Mex – "Pop Off Selecta"; DJ Tee – "Eni Duro" (Winner)
Next Rated	African Artiste of the Year
Ice Prince – "Oleku"; Wizkid – "Holla at Your Boy" (Winner); Olamide – "Eni Duro"; Tiwa Savage – "Kele Kele Love"	(Angola) Cabo Snoop – "Windeck" (Winner); (Ghana) R2Bees – "Kiss Your Hand"; (South Africa) Liquideep – "Fairytale"; (South Africa) Freshlyground – "Waka Waka"; (Ghana) V.I.P – "Away"
Hip Hop World Revelation of the Year	Hall of Fame
Dr SID (Winner); Mo'Cheddah; Jesse Jagz; YQ; Lynxxx	Sir Shina Peters
