= Seyi or Shay =

Studio album by Seyi Shay
- Released: 16 November 2015
- Recorded: 2013–2015
- Genre: Pop; Afro-pop; reggae; R&B; hip hop; Afrobeat
- Length: 63:22
- Label: Island, Stargurl Limited
- Producer: Pheelz; Del B; Dokta Frabz; Johan Hugo; Legendury Beatz; Otee Beatz; Jerome Williams; Spax; Tee-Y Mix; DB Records; Mike Okoigun

Seyi Shay chronology
Seyi or Shay (2015)	Electric Package, Vol. 1 (2018)

Singles from Seyi or Shay
- 1. "Murda" Released: 1 April 2014; 2. "Crazy" Released: 15 October 2014; 3. "Jangilova" Released: 17 April 2015; 4. "Right Now" Released: 7 July 2015; 5. "Right Now (Remix)" Released: 18 October 2015

Seyi or Shay is the debut studio album by Nigerian singer-songwriter Seyi Shay. Formerly scheduled for release on 13 November 2015, the album was later shifted to 16 November 2015. Released through Island Records and Stargurl Limited, the album generally features guest appearances from Femi Kuti, Wizkid, Iyanya, Banky W., Olamide, Patoranking, D'banj, Sound Sultan, Timaya, and Cynthia Morgan and production handled by Legendury Beatz, Princeton, Mike Okoigun, Pheelz, Spax, Otee Beatz, Phame, Dokta Frabz, Johan Hugo, Tee-Y Mix, Jerome Williams, Harmony Samuels and Del B.

== Concept and background ==
The concept behind Seyi or Shay expresses both sides of Seyi Shay as a person and a music artist. The album represents these dual sides: Seyi, portraying a traditional, good-girl persona, and Shay, embodying a more bold and international character. Together, they reflect the complexity of her personality and artistic expression. On 10 November 2015, Seyi Shay revealed that Seyi or Shay would include guest appearances from the likes of Sauti Sol and Flavour and production from Harmony Samuels, Tee-Y Mix, Legendury Beatz, Del B, and others.

== Promotion ==
On 10 November 2015, Seyi Shay released a video trailer which served as a teaser in promotion of the album. The video clip, directed by Meji Alabi for JM Films, depicts the two sides of her. On 13 November 2015, a listening party for the album was hosted at the Eko Hotels and Suites, with notable artists like Banky W., Cynthia Morgan, Iyanya, Toke Makinwa, Eva Alordiah and Paul Okoye in attendance.

=== Singles ===
Seyi or Shay's lead single "Murda" featuring Patoranking and Shaydee was released on 1 April 2014. It was produced by Dokta Frabz and was nominated for Best Reggae/Dancehall Single at The Headies 2014. The album's second single "Crazy" features Wizkid and was released on 15 October 2014. It was produced by Legendury Beatz. The third single "Jangilova" was released on 17 April 2015. A highlife track, it was written by Harrysong and produced by Del B. The album's fourth single "Right Now" was released on 7 July 2015. It was produced by Harmony Samuels and was the first single Shay released during her contract with Island Records. The fifth and final single off the album is the remix to "Right Now" and features Banky W. and Iyanya. It was released on 18 October 2015.

== Critical reception ==
Pulse Nigeria's Joey Akan described Seyi or Shay as a mixed effort that highlights Seyi Shay's dual personality but struggles with cohesion, stating, "this album lacks a signature sound." He noted that while the album has standout tracks like "Right Now", "Murda", and "Crazy", it often feels disjointed due to its patchwork production and reliance on 14 different producers. He rated the album a 3 out of 5, deeming it "worth checking out." Ogaga Sakpaide of tooXclusive praised the album for showcasing Seyi Shay's vocal skills and tackling various themes with emotional precision, describing it as "what the career doctor prescribed". While standout tracks like "Higher", "Right Now", and "No Vacancy" displayed her strengths, the album was critiqued for lacking cohesion and some underwhelming collaborations. He rated the album 3 out of 5.

Oris Aigbokhaevbolo from Music in Africa highlighted Seyi or Shay as a calculated and market-driven debut that leans heavily on sexual themes and collaborations with male stars to navigate a male-dominated industry. He noted that the album explores female empowerment through a lens often tied to male desire, with tracks like "In Public" and "Right Now" reflecting the "new woman in pop as an empowered being". While describing the album as engaging but overproduced, he concluded, "Sex, as they say, sells", and expected the album to perform well in the market.

=== Accolades ===
Year	Awards ceremony	Award description(s)	Results
2016	The Headies	Best R&B/Pop Album	Nominated
2016	The Headies	Hip Hop World Revelation of the Year	Nominated
2016	The Headies	Album of the Year	Nominated

== Track listing ==
Seyi or Shay track listing
No.	Title	Writer(s)	Producer(s)	Length
1.	"Intro"	—	Mike Okoigun	1:06
2.	"The Mic"	Deborah Joshua	Harmony Samuels	3:07
3.	"In Public" (featuring Cynthia Morgan)	Joshua; Cynthia Morgan	Jerome Williams	3:15
4.	"Mary" (featuring Phyno)	Joshua; Chibuzor Azubuike	Otee Beatz	3:17
5.	"Right Now"	Joshua	Samuels	3:23
6.	"Healer" (featuring Sound Sultan)	Joshua; Olanrewaju Fasasi	Samuels	3:17
7.	"Crazy" (featuring Wizkid)	Joshua; Ayodeji Balogun	Legendury Beatz	3:54
8.	"No Vacancy"	Joshua	Tee-Y Mix	3:15
9.	"Pack and Go" (featuring Olamide)	Joshua; Olamide Adedeji	Pheelz	3:42
10.	"Murda" (featuring Patoranking and Shaydee)	Joshua; Patrick Okorie; Shadrach Adeboye	Dokta Frabz	3:30
11.	"Higher"	Joshua	Johan Hugo	4:27
12.	"Everlasting Love"	Joshua	Princeton Beatz	3:21
13.	"Killing Me Softly" (featuring Timaya)	Joshua; Inetimi Odon	Del B	3:39
14.	"Church" (featuring Boj)	Joshua; Bolaji Odojukan	Phame	3:37
15.	"Loud" (featuring Femi Kuti)	Joshua	Spax	2:51
16.	"Tina" (featuring D'banj)	Joshua; Oladapo Oyebanjo	DB Records	3:42
17.	"Love Wan Tin Tin"	Joshua	Tee-Y Mix	3:00
18.	"Jangilova"	Harrison Okiri	Del B	3:24

Wanted track listing
No.	Title	Writer(s)	Producer(s)	Length
19.	"Right Now (Remix)" (featuring Banky W. and Iyanya)	Joshua; Olubankole Wellington; Iyanya Mbuk	Samuels	3:35
Total length:				63:22

== Personnel ==
Credits adapted from back cover.

- Mike Okoigun — production (track 1)
- Harmony Samuels — production (tracks 2, 5, 6, 19)
- Jerome Williams — production (track 3)
- Otee Beatz — production (track 4)
- Legendury Beatz — production (track 7)
- Tee-Y Mix — production (tracks 8, 17)
- Pheelz — production (track 9)
- Dokta Frabz — production (track 10)
- Johan Hugo — production (track 11)
- Princeton Beatz — production (track 12)
- Del B — production (track 13, 18)
- Phame — production (track 14)
- Spax — production (track 15)
- DB Records — production (track 16)
- Suka Sounds — mixing, mastering (all tracks)
