= Superstar (Wizkid album) =

Studio album by Wizkid
- Released: 12 June 2011
- Recorded: 2009–2011
- Genres: Afrobeats; reggae; dancehall; R&B
- Languages: English; Yoruba; Nigerian Pidgin
- Label: Empire Mates Entertainment
- Producers: Samklef; E-Kelly; Jay Sleek; Shizzi; DJ Klem; Masterkraft; Q-Beats; Banky W; Vebee

Wizkid chronology
Superstar (2011)	Empire Mates State of Mind (2012)

Singles from Superstar
- 1. "Holla at Your Boy" Released: 2 January 2010; 2. "Tease Me/Bad Guys" Released: 2 April 2010; 3. "Don't Dull" Released: 4 December 2010; 4. "Love My Baby" Released: 29 August 2011; 5. "Pakurumo" Released: 10 December 2011; 6. "Oluwa Lo Ni" Released: 17 July 2012

Superstar is the debut studio album by Nigerian singer Wizkid. It was released by Empire Mates Entertainment on 12 June 2011. The album's production was handled by Samklef, E-Kelly, Jay Sleek, Shizzi, DJ Klem, Masterkraft, Q-Beats, Banky W and Vebee. It features collaborations with Wande Coal, D'Prince, Banky W and Skales. Superstar was supported by the singles "Holla at Your Boy", "Tease Me/Bad Guys", "Don't Dull", "Love My Baby", "Pakurumo", and "Oluwa Lo Ni". It is the second best selling album on NotJustOk and was the most highly anticipated Nigerian album of 2011.

== Background and composition ==
In an interview with Factory78 TV, Wizkid said the album was meant to be released on Valentine's Day, but was postponed due to preparations for a London gig. Musically, Superstar is a mixture of Afrobeats, R&B, dancehall and reggae. The album's themes deal primarily with starting from the bottom and reaching to the top, i.e. from grass to grace. In "No Lele", Wizkid talks about hustle and how he had to work hard to succeed. In "Say My Name", he talks about his success and how everyone now "calls his name". In "Wad Up", he is reminiscent about the time he used to get insulted by people who called him dirty. In "Shout Out", he thanked everyone who helped him become successful. In a nutshell, Wizkid describes his early life, particularly the hardships he endured and how he triumphant and made a name for himself. Wizkid also made references to God.

== Singles ==
The album's lead single, "Holla at Your Boy", was released on 2 January 2010. The accompanying music video for the song, which was filmed at Dowen College in Lekki, features cameo appearances from Skales and Ice Prince. "Tease Me/Bad Guys" was released on 2 April 2010, as the album's second single. Its music video was filmed by Kemi Adetiba at Aqua Nightclub in Abuja. The album's third single, "Don't Dull", was released on 4 December 2010; the song's official remix features vocals by Akon and was leaked on 26 October 2011. "Love My Baby" was released on 29 August 2011 as the album's fourth single.

The album's fifth single, "Pakurumo", was released on 10 December 2011. The accompanying music video for the song features cameo appearances from Pasuma, Ali Baba, Tee-A, Funke Akindele, Skales, Lynxxx, Davido, Banky W, Pope Da Hitman, Tiwa Savage, Mo'Cheddah, and Ice Prince. The music video for "Oluwa Lo Ni", the album's fifth single, was filmed in 3D by Eban Olivier of Mushroom Productions and released on 17 July 2012.

== Critical reception ==
Professional ratings
Review scores
Source	Rating
360nobs	7.5/10
Jaguda	7.0/10
Nigerian Entertainment Today	3/5 stars

Superstar received generally positive reviews from music critics. Arinze Obikili, a writer for the website Jaguda.com awarded the album 7 stars out of 10, describing it as "a sound album for an artist who has put out numerous profitable songs". Oye Akideinde of 360nobs granted the album an overall verdict of 7.5 out of 10, saying it doesn't contain political themes and that its lyrical content doesn't border that of the Abami Eda. A Nigerian Entertainment Today writer gave the album 3 stars out of 5, commending Wizkid for "compressing albums 2 and 3 of his career into one CD" and saying the record "could be the beginning of something very special in Nigerian music".

=== Accolades ===
Superstar won Best Album of the Year at the 2012 Nigeria Entertainment Awards. It was nominated for Album of the Year and Best R&B/Pop Album at The Headies 2012.

== Track listing ==
No.	Title	Writer(s)	Producer(s)	Length
1.	"Say My Name"	Ayodeji Balogun	E. Kelly	3:46
2.	"No Lele"	Balogun	Masterkraft; Banky W	3:38
3.	"Scatter the Floor"	Balogun	Jay Sleek	3:41
4.	"Pakurumo"	Balogun	Samklef	3:32
5.	"Slow Whine" (featuring Banky W)	Balogun; Olubankole Wellington	Samklef	4:00
6.	"Love My Baby"	Balogun	Shizzi	4:06
7.	"Gidi Girl"	Balogun	DJ Klem (Knighthouse)	4:10
8.	"Oluwa Lo Ni"	Balogun	Jay Sleek	3:24
9.	"Don't Dull"	Balogun	Samklef	4:39
10.	"Tease Me/Bad Guys"	Balogun	Samklef	3:08
11.	"Eme Boyz" (featuring Skales and Banky W)	Balogun; Raoul Njeng-Njeng; Olubankole Wellington	Masterkraft	3:57
12.	"What You Wanna Do?"	Balogun	Samklef	3:19
13.	"For Me" (featuring Wande Coal)	Balogun; Oluwatobi Ojosipe	Jay Sleek	3:45
14.	"Holla at Your Boy"	Balogun	DJ Klem (Knighthouse); Vebee	4:21
15.	"Wad Up" (featuring D'Prince)	Balogun; Charles Enebeli	Samklef	3:26
16.	"Shout Out"	Balogun	Q Beats	2:44
Total length:				63:42

Bonus track
No.	Title	Writer(s)	Length
17.	"Wiz Party" (bonus freestyle leak)	Balogun	4:00
Total length:			4:00

== Personnel ==
Credits adapted from Superstar's back cover.

- Ayodeji Balogun – primary artist, executive producer, writer, performer
- Olubankole Wellington – executive producer, featured artist, producer, writer
- Segun Demuren – executive producer
- Tunde Demuren – assistant executive producer, A&R
- Stanley "Tino Benbel" Ekuro – assistant executive producer, A&R
- Raoul John Njeng-Njeng – featured artist, writer
- Charles Enebeli – featured artist, writer
- Oluwatobi Wande Ojosipe – featured artist, writer
- Samklef – producer
- E-Kelly – producer
- Jay Sleek – producer
- Sheyi Akerele – producer
- DJ Klem – producer
- Sunny (Masterkraft) Nweke – producer
- Q-Beats – producer
- Vebee – producer
- Zeeno Foster – mixed, mastering
- Brexx Bitaseme – recording engineer
- Osagie Osarenkhoe – management
- Seyi Charles George – photography
- Osa Seven – album artwork
- Uba Pacific – marketer, distributor

== Release history ==
Region	Date	Format	Label
Various	1 July 2011	CD, Digital download	Empire Mates Entertainment
Nigeria	12 June 2011	CD, Digital download	Empire Mates Entertainment
