= Dowen College =

College in Lagos

Coordinates: 6.43756°N 3.46437°E

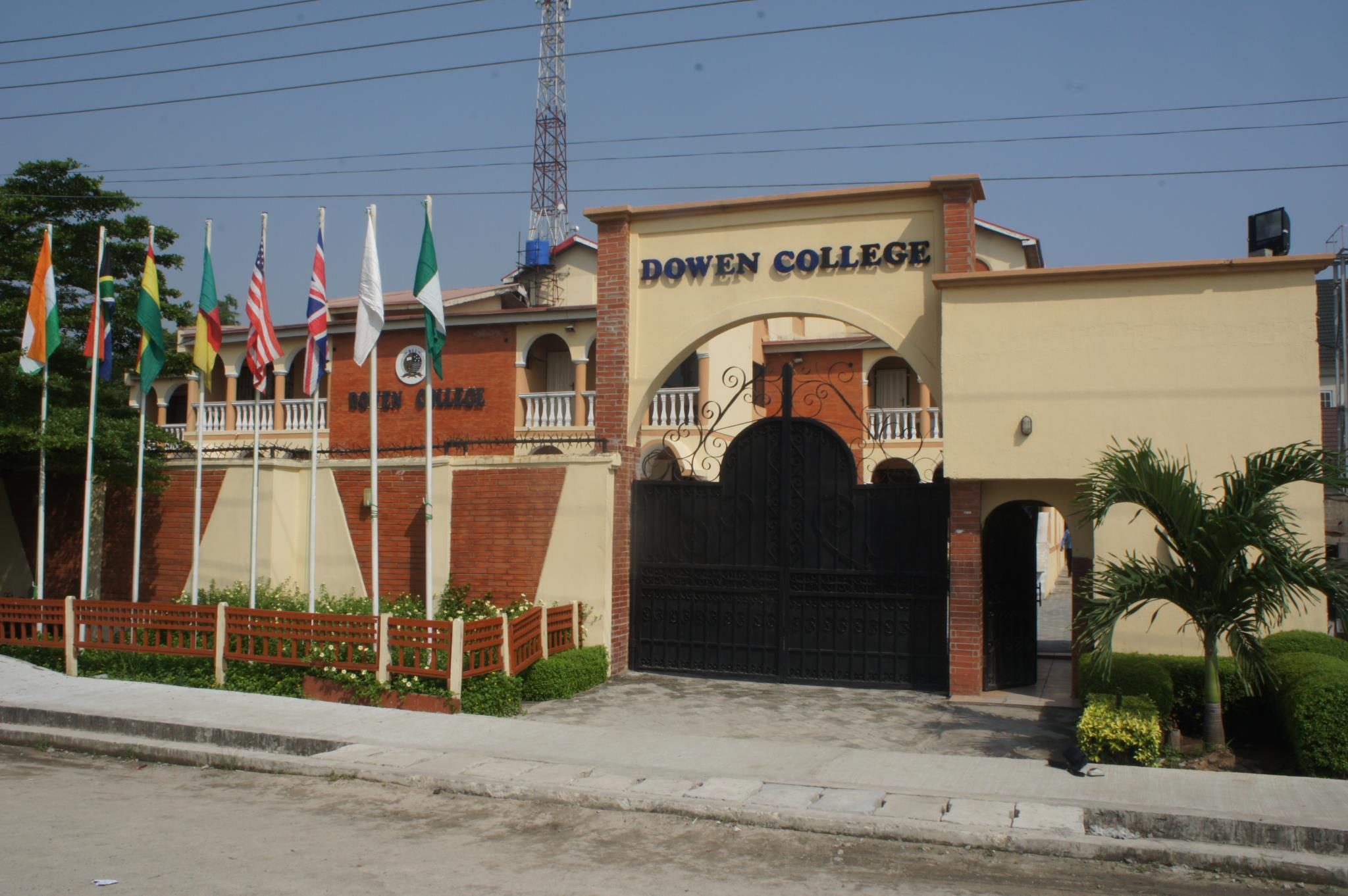

Information
- Type: Private, day & boarding school
- Principal: Dr. A. Layiwola
- Gender: Mixed
- Age: 11 to 18

Dowen College is a co-educational college located in Lekki, a suburb of Lagos.

The college admits both boarding and day pupils between the ages of 11 and 18 years. In 2015, the school organised a valedictory service, where outstanding students in their academic performance were rewarded.

The music video for Wizkid's "Holla at Your Boy" was shot at Dowen College.

== Controversy over the death of Sylvester Oromoni ==
In December 2021, Sylvester Oromoni, a 12-year-old student at Dowen College, Lagos, was reported to have been bullied and beaten by five senior students after he allegedly refused to join a cult group. According to his father, the students also gave him a chemical substance to drink. Following his death, the Lagos State Government ordered the indefinite closure of the school pending the outcome of investigations. The incident sparked widespread public outcry, with the hashtag #JusticeForSylvesterOromoni trending across social media. The parents of four of the students involved voluntarily submitted themselves to the police for further investigation. In April 2024, the Lagos State Coroner concluded its inquest into Oromoni’s death. The coroner ruled that his death was natural but avoidable, attributing it to medical and parental negligence rather than bullying or poisoning. The findings indicated that Oromoni died from sepsis caused by an untreated ankle injury, which led to complications in his lungs and kidneys. The coroner exonerated Dowen College and its staff, while highlighting negligence by the parents and the family doctor for not seeking timely medical attention. Recommendations included improvements in student monitoring and psychological support within the school.

== Notable alumni ==
- Moet Abebe, video jockey, television presenter, actress, and catering exec
- Tems, Nigerian Singer

Academic Excellence

- Buraimoh Obaseyi Daniel,(Class of 2010) – Achieved a First Class degree in Computer Science from San Francisco State University, becoming the first Nigerian to do so at the institution.
- David Umo, (Class of 2015) – Graduated with 8 A1s in the West African Senior School Certificate Examination (WASSCE).
- Ene Nnenna, (Class of 2017) – Achieved 9 A1s in WASSCE 2017.
- Serena Omo-Lamai, (Class of 2015) – Bioengineer and academic. She graduated as valedictorian with top WASSCE and IGCSE results, earned a Ph.D. in Bioengineering from the University of Pennsylvania, and received the PhRMA Foundation Predoctoral Fellowship in Drug Delivery.

Entrepreneurship & Leadership

- Henry Ugochukwu Nneji, – Listed among the nominees for Forbes Africa's 30 Under 30 Class of 2025.

== See also ==
- List of schools in Lagos
