= Baddest Boy =

Single by E.M.E featuring Wizkid, Skales, and Banky W

from the album Empire Mates State of Mind
- Released: 5 April 2012
- Recorded: 2012
- Genre: Afropop; hip hop
- Length: 4:00
- Label: Empire Mates Entertainment
- Songwriters: Ayodeji Balogun; Raoul John Njeng-Njeng; Olubankole Wellington
- Producer: Legendury Beatz

Empire Mates Entertainment singles chronology
| "Baddest Boy" (2012) | "Dance For Me" (2012) |

Wizkid singles chronology
| "Sisi Nene" (2012) | "Baddest Boy" (2012) | "That Girl" (2012) |

Music video
- "Baddest Boy" on YouTube

"Baddest Boy" is a song by E.M.E acts Wizkid, Skales, and Banky W. Released on April 5, 2012, it serves as the lead single from the label's compilation album, Empire Mates State of Mind (2012). A leaked version of the song, featuring vocals from Wizkid and Skales, surfaced on the internet prior to its official release. OkayAfrica described "Baddest Boy" as a "banger with synths that resemble a heavily screwed “Akpako Master”. The song was produced by the record producing duo Legendury Beatz.

== Background and recording ==
In an interview with MTV Iggy's Beverly Bryan, Wizkid was asked about the song's recording process. He responded, saying, "So, I went into the studio and I heard the beat. And Skales starts working on this verse. And then I came on. And then Banky did his verse. And then the song came out and it’s a successful song. I’m thankful for that."

== Music video ==
The accompanying music video for "Baddest Boy" was directed by Clarence Peters. It was uploaded to YouTube on 18 July 2012, and features cameo appearances from Shaydee, Niyola and DJ Xclusive. According to Nigeria Trends, the music video was shot in a private jet and hangar.

== Accolades ==
The music video for "Baddest Boy" was nominated for Most Gifted Duo/Group/Featuring Video at the 2013 Channel O Music Video Awards, which was held at the Walter Sisulu Square, in Kliptown, Soweto on November 30, 2013. "Baddest Boy" earned E.M.E acts a nomination for Best Collabo at The Headies 2013.

=== Track listing ===
Digital single

| No. | Title | Writer(s) | Producer(s) | Length |
|---|---|---|---|---|
| 1. | "Baddest Boy" (EME featuring Wizkid, Skales, and Banky W.) | Ayodeji Balogun, Raoul John Njeng-Njeng, Olubankole Wellington | Lengendury Beatz | 4:00 |
