= Osagie Osarenkhoe =

- Other name: Teresa Osagioduwa
- Citizenship: Nigerian
- Education: University of Lagos
- Occupations: Music Executive, A&R Executive, Talent Manager
- Employer: ONErpm
- Title: Director

Teresa Osagioduwa Osarenkhoe, known professionally as Osagie Osarenkhoe, is a Nigerian music business executive with a career spanning over two decades. She currently is the Director of A&R/Operations (Africa) at ONErpm and is the founder of The Zone Talent Agency Limited, dba The Zone Agency, a talent management and music services company. Osarenkhoe is also the creator of The Basement Gig, a music showcase platform aimed at spotlighting emerging talent in the Nigerian music industry. Her past roles include a stint at Empire Mates Entertainment.

== Career ==
At ONErpm, Osagie managed A&R, operations, and management efforts for ONErpm, Empire Mates Entertainment, and priority records, working with artists such as Wizkid, Zlatan, Asake,Bella Shmurda, Timaya, Skales, Chike, MohBad(late), Niyola, Ajebo Hustlers, 1da Banton, Reekado Banks, Dammy Krane, Banky W, and others. She was also involved in the signing of artists, including Zlatan, Bella Shmurda, Nasboi, Asake, Chike, Ajebo Hustlers, and 1da Banton, etc., as well as handling the release of popular tracks such as "Cash App" by Bella Shmurda, "Egwu" by Chike and Mohbad, and "Bust Down" by Zlatan and Asake, among others.

In 2021, The Cable Lifestyle (In the spirit of the 2021 IWD) examines Osagie as one of the four female artist-managers doing well for themselves alongside Bose Ogulu, Niyi Osidipe, Kimani Moore. In 2021, she was listed as one of TurnTable Power List 2021 by TurnTable Charts.

== Recognitions ==
S/N	Award	Category	Year	Result
1	The Future Awards Africa	Creative Professional of the Year	2010	Nominated
2	The Future Awards Africa	Creative Professional of the Year	2011	Nominated
3	The Beatz Awards	Artist Manager of the Year	2015	Nominated
4	The Beatz Awards	Artist Manager of the Year	2017	Nominated
5	Scream Youth Awards	Youth Entertainment Personality	2017	Nominated
