= Empire Mates State of Mind =

2012 compilation album by Empire Mates Entertainment

Compilation album by Empire Mates Entertainment
- Released: 18 June 2012
- Recorded: 2011–2012
- Genres: Afropop; reggae; R&B; pop
- Label: EME
- Producers: Legendury Beatz; Sarz; Masterkraft; Cobhams Asuquo; Kid Konnect; Spellz

Banky W. chronology
The W Experience (2009)	Empire Mates State of Mind (2012)	R&BW (2013)

Wizkid chronology
Superstar (2011)	Empire Mates State of Mind (2012)	Ayo (2014)

Skales chronology
Empire Mates State of Mind (2012)	Man of the Year (2015)

Singles from Empire Mates State of Mind
- 1. "Baddest Boy" Released: 2 April 2012; 2. "Dance for Me" Released: 25 July 2012; 3. "Get Down Tonight" Released: 1 August 2012; 4. "Ko Mo Le" Released: 11 October 2012; 5. "Sun Mo Mi" Released: 14 November 2012; 6. "Don't Delay Me (Don't Go There)" Released: 21 November 2012; 7. "Change" Released: 28 November 2012

Empire Mates State of Mind is a compilation album by musicians of Nigerian record label Empire Mates Entertainment (E.M.E). It was released by the label on 18 June 2012. The album's production was handled by Legendury Beatz, Sarz, Masterkraft, Cobhams Asuquo, Kid Konnect and Spellz. Empire Mates State of Mind features collaborations with X.O Senavoe, Rotimi and comedian Basketmouth. It produced seven singles—"Baddest Boy", "Dance for Me", "Get Down Tonight", "Ko Mo Le", "Sun Mo Mi", "Don't Delay Me (Don't Go There)" and "Change".

== Background and recording ==
Banky W, Wizkid and Skales started recording songs for the album in 2011. Most of the songs on the project were recorded at E.M.E headquarters. Banky W told Beverly Bryan of MTV Iggy that living with Skales and Wizkid made the album easier to record. Empire Mates State of Mind was initially scheduled for release on 12 June 2012, but ended up being postponed. E.M.E released the album's final track list instead. On 15 and 16 June, E.M.E organized a listening party and launch event to celebrate and promote the album. The listening party was held at the Deuces Bar & Lounge in Victoria Island, Lagos.

Empire Mates State of Mind was released exclusively on Spinlet, a digital media company. As a means of promoting the album and its brand, Spinlet gave away 100,000 copies of the album to its subscribers. The album was made available for free digital download to the first 75,000 people who downloaded Spinlet's official mobile application. Nigerian Entertainment Today posted a step-by-step tutorial on how Spinlet subscribers can download the album.

== Singles ==
The album's lead single, "Baddest Boy", was released on 2 April 2012. The song was produced by Legendury Beatz and features contributing vocals by Wizkid, Skales and Banky W. The accompanying music video for "Baddest Boy" was directed by Clarence Peters and uploaded to YouTube on 18 July 2012. The Sarz-produced track "Dance for Me" was released on 25 July 2012, as the album's second single. The visuals for the song were directed by Sesan. "Get Down Tonight", which Sarz also produced, was released as the album's third single. The song's music video was directed by Moe Musa, with its release marking the end of E.M.E Wednesdays.

On 11 October 2012, "Ko Mo Le" was released as the album's fourth single. Its music video was released the same day and filmed by 1st Impression in Washington DC. "Sun Mo Mi", co-produced by Masterkraft and Banky W, was released as the album's fifth single. The Peters-directed music video for the song features cameo appearances from Wizkid, Niyola, DJ Xclusive, Iyanya, Flowssick, Iceberg Slim and Slim T. The Spellz-produced track "Don't Delay Me (Don't Go There)" was released as the album's sixth single. The visuals for the song feature cameo appearances from Lynxxx, Gbenro, Dammy Krane, Skales, Shaydee and DJ Xclusive. "Change" was released as the album's seventh single. The song addresses some of Nigeria's current plights. The music video for "Change" was filmed by Peters.

== Critical reception ==
Professional ratings
Review scores
Source	Rating
TayoTV	8.5/10
360nobs	7/10
TooXclusive	3/5 stars
Nigerian Entertainment Today	3.5/5 stars

Empire Mates State of Mind received generally positive reviews from music critics. A writer for TayoTV, who goes by the moniker Teaponpi, rated the album 8.5 out of 10 and commended the work of each artist. Wilfred Okiche of 360nobs granted the album a rating of 7 out of 10, acknowledging it for being "unabashed in owning up to its motives". Okiche further stated that its production "may become repetitive at some point despite the variety of producers involved".

Reviewing for Nigerian Entertainment Today, Ayomide Tayo granted the album 3.5 stars out of 5, characterizing it as "one directional at times, with its emphasis on party music" and commending the artists for bringing "their own style to each song, saving the project from not being too repetitive." TooXclusive's Ogaga Sakapide gave the album 3 stars out of 5, describing it as "monotonous, tired club-beats and too lengthy". Sakapide acknowledged Wizkid, Niyola and Wellington and said the record is "pretty solid".

=== Accolades ===
Empire Mates State of Mind was nominated for Best Album of the Year at the 2013 Nigeria Entertainment Awards.

== Track listing ==
No.	Title	Writer(s)	Producer(s)	Length
1.	"Baddest Boy" (featuring Wizkid, Skales, and Banky W.)	Ayodeji Balogun; Olubankole Wellington; Raoul John Njeng-Njeng	Legendury Beatz	4:00
2.	"Get Down Tonight" (featuring Wizkid, Skales, and Banky W.)	Balogun; Wellington; Njeng-Njeng	Sarz	3:49
3.	"Sun Mo Mi" (featuring Shaydee, Skales, Banky W.)	Shadrach Adeboye; Njeng-Njeng; Wellington	Masterkraft; Banky W	4:06
4.	"Hate, Pt. 1" (featuring Basketmouth)	Bright Okpocha	—	1:12
5.	"Roll It" (featuring Wizkid and Banky W.)	Balogun; Wellington	Spellz	2:51
6.	"Find My Trouble" (featuring Banky W., Shaydee, and Skales)	Wellington; Adeboye; Njeng-Njeng	Spellz	3:56
7.	"Body" (featuring Wizkid)	Balogun	Shizzi	2:57
8.	"Ko Mo Le" (featuring Skales)	Njeng-Njeng	Sarz	4:19
9.	"Dance" (featuring Banky W. and X.O Senavoe)	Wellington; X.O Senavoe	Cobhams Asuquo	3:51
10.	"Don't Delay Me (Don't Go There)" (featuring Niyola)	Eniola Akinbo	Spellz	4:16
11.	"London Girl" (featuring Wizkid)	Balogun	Spellz	3:43
12.	"Hate, Pt. 2" (featuring Basketmouth)	Bright Okpocha	—	1:08
13.	"Dance for Me" (featuring Wizkid)	Balogun	Sarz	2:51
14.	"Follow Go House" (Skales, Shaydee and Banky W.)	Njeng-Njeng; Adeboye; Wellington	Spellz	4:47
15.	"My Baby" (featuring Skales)	Njeng-Njeng	Sarz	3:56
16.	"Only You" (featuring Banky W., Shaydee, and Rotimi)	Wellington; Adeboye; Rotimi	Masterkraft	4:52
17.	"Reppin' Emeazzyyy" (featuring Wizkid, Skales, and Banky W.)	Balogun; Njeng-Njeng; Olubankole Wellington	Kid Konnect	4:31
18.	"Wetin' I Want" (featuring Skales and Niyola)	Njeng-Njeng; Akinbo	Legendury Beatz	4:26
19.	"Change" (featuring Banky W., Wizkid, Skales, Shaydee, Niyola, and DJ Xclusive)	Wellington; Balogun; Njeng-Njeng; Adeboye; Akinbo	Spellz	4:23
20.	"See My Mama" (featuring Wizkid, Banky W., and Shaydee)	Balogun; Wellington; Adeboye	Legendury Beatz	4:07
21.	"Hate, Pt. 3" (featuring Basketmouth)	Okpocha	—	1:16
22.	"Can't Stop Us" (featuring Banky W., Wizkid, Skales, Shaydee, Niyola, and X.O Senavoe)	Wellington; Balogun; Njeng-Njeng; Adeboye; Akinbo; X.O Senavoe	Masterkraft	4:09
Total length:				74:86

Notes

- "—" denotes a skit

== Personnel ==
Credits adapted from the album's back cover.

- Olubankole Wellington – primary artist, writer, executive producer
- Segun Demuren – executive producer
- Stanley "Tino Bendel" Ekure – A&R, co-executive producer, management
- Tunde Demuren – A&R, co-executive producer
- Ayodeji Balogun – primary artist, writer
- Raoul John Njeng-Njeng – primary artist, writer
- Shadrach Adeboye – primary artist, writer
- Eniola Akinbo – primary artist, writer
- X.O Senavoe – featured artist
- Rotimi – featured artist
- Bright Okpocha – skit performer, writer
- Legendury Beatz – producer
- Sarz – producer
- Masterkraft – producer
- Cohbams Asuquo – producer
- Kid Konnect – producer
- Spellz – producer
- Suka "The Surgeon" Andrew – mix and master engineer
- Anuel Modebe – photography
- Seyi Charles George – photography
- Obi Somto – photography
- Osagie Osarenkhoe – management

== Release history ==
Region	Date	Format	Label
Nigeria	4 July 2012	CD, Digital download	Empire Mates Entertainment
