= Forever Be Mine =

2025 song by Gunna featuring Wizkid

Song by Gunna featuring Wizkid

from the album The Last Wun
- Released: August 8, 2025
- Genre: Trap
- Length: 2:53
- Label: YSL; 300
- Songwriters: Sergio Kitchens; Ayodeji Balogun; Chandler Great; Amman Nurani; Simarpreet Bahia; Markeevius Smith; Segrate Price
- Producers: Turbo; Evrgrn; Sim; Doc Maestro; Pi Polish

"Forever Be Mine" is a song by American rapper Gunna from his sixth studio album, The Last Wun (2025). Featuring Nigerian singer Wizkid, it was produced by Turbo, Evrgrn, Sim, Doc Maestro and Pi Polish.

== Composition ==
"Forever Be Mine" is a trap song. In his signature melodic rap, Gunna croons about the things he does for his lover.

== Critical reception ==
Mackenzie Cummings-Grady of Billboard ranked "Forever Be Mine" as the second best song from The Last Wun, writing "Gunna and Wizkid sound amazing together on 'Forever Be Mine,' even if Wiz's verse feels a little half-baked. The YSL signee brings Wizkid deep into his world, and forces him to adapt to the slow, moody trap energy that drives the track. Hearing Wiz step outside his comfort zone into Gunna's atmospheric trap world is exciting, but Wiz disappears into the song's fog, with Gunna still doing most of the legwork on the latter half." Aron A. of HotNewHipHop stated "WizKid's 'forever be mine' blends seamlessly with Gunna's romance-heavy mode."

== Charts ==
Chart performance for "Forever Be Mine"
Chart (2025)	Peak position
Global 200 (Billboard)	111
Nigeria (TurnTable Top 100)	2
South Africa Streaming (TOSAC)	13
UK Singles (OCC)	46
UK Hip Hop/R&B (OCC)	8
US Billboard Hot 100	68
US Hot R&B/Hip-Hop Songs (Billboard)	16
