= Holla at Your Boy =

Single by Wizkid

from the album Superstar
- Released: 2 January 2010
- Recorded: 2009
- Genre: Afrobeats
- Length: 5:08
- Label: EME
- Songwriter: Ayodeji Balogun
- Producers: DJ Klem; Vebee

Wizkid singles chronology
"Omoge You Too Much" (2009)	"Holla at Your Boy" (2010)	"Tease Me/Bad Guys" (2010)

Music video
- "Holla at Your Boy" on YouTube

"Holla at Your Boy" is a song by Nigerian singer Wizkid, released on 2 January 2010. Produced by DJ Klem and Vebee, the song serves as the lead single from his debut studio album Superstar (2011)

== Background ==
"Holla at your boy" samples SE7ENs 2009 single "Girls" featuring Lil Kim.

== Award ==
At The Headies 2011, "Holla at Your Boy" won Wizkid the Next Rated prize and received a 2012 Hyundai Sonata from the organizers. The car's presentation ceremony took place at the Silverbird Galleria in Victoria Island, Lagos. Guy Murray Bruce, Bola Salako and Ayo Animashaun were all present during the ceremony. Wizkid joined the list of past winners, including Aṣa, Overdose, Omawumi, Wande Coal and Skuki.

The single was also nominated for "Best Pop Single" at the same event.

== Music video ==
The music video for "Holla at Your Boy" was directed by Patrick Ellis. It was filmed at Dowen College in Lekki, Lagos, and features cameo appearances from Banky W, Skales and Ice Prince.

== Reception ==
Abioye Damilare Samson classified in Vanguard "Holla at Your Boy" in 2020 as "smooth tune with western-infused lyrics". He praises Wizkids "lightness that didn’t feel forced: “When you see me come around, I got you looking at me/ I don’t need to spend my cash, ‘cos my swag’s not hard to see”. The line was a statement of self-awareness from the young Ayodeji Ibrahim Balogun, who already knew he carried a kind of effortless aura". Wale Oloworekende remembered in 2020: "We were introduced to an utterly utopian ideal that ushered in a new era for Nigerian music: the debut of Wizkid. 10 years ago, this month, Wizkid blessed the world with his debut single, Holla At Your Boy, and nothing was the same."

== Accolades ==
Year	Awards ceremony	Award description(s)	Results	Ref
2011	Nigeria Music Video Awards (NMVA)	Best Afro Pop Video	Nominated	
2011	Channel O Music Video Awards	Most Gifted Newcomer Video	Nominated	
2011	The Headies 2011	Best Pop Single	Nominated	
2011	The Headies 2011	Next Rated	Won	
