= Tease Me/Bad Guys =

Single by Wizkid

from the album Superstar
- Released: 2 April 2010
- Recorded: 2010
- Genre: Afrobeats
- Length: 4:04
- Label: Empire Mates Entertainment
- Songwriter: Ayodeji Balogun
- Producer: Samklef

Wizkid singles chronology
"Holla at Your Boy" (2010)	"Tease Me/Bad Guys" (2010)	"Formula" (2010)

Music video
- "Tease Me/Bad Guys" on YouTube

"Tease Me/Bad Guys" is a song by Nigerian singer Wizkid, released on 2 April 2010. It serves as the second single from his debut album, Superstar (2011), and was produced by Samklef.

== Music video ==
The accompanying music video for "Tease Me/Bad Guys" was filmed by Kemi Adetiba at Aqua Nightclub in Abuja. It features cameo appearances from Skales, Samklef, D'Prince, Ice Prince, M.I, Jesse Jagz, ELDee, Dr SID, Wande Coal and Banky W.

== Accolades ==
"Tease Me/Bad Guys" was nominated for Hottest Single of the Year at the 2011 Nigeria Entertainment Awards.
