= Durella (musician) =

Nigerian recording artist, songwriter, and businessman

Oluwadamilare Okulaja, also known as Durella (King of the Zanga), is a Nigerian recording artist, performer, songwriter and businessman. He is known for his singles, "Enu Ose", "Shayo", "Wizkolo Wiska", "Club Rock" and "GaGa" featuring Wizkid. He appeared on songs with stars such as Dbanj, Femi Kuti, Duncan Mighty, Terry G, Olamide, and Dammy Krane, and performed live with Wyclef Jean in South Africa. In 2008 Durella was awarded "MTV Base Advance Warning Artist" of the year. He is the first Nigerian artist to own a shoe line: Durella Sneakers, named after his popular slogan "2Gbaski". Durella issued his debut album King Of The Zanga under TC- Record Label. His second album was Reconfigurated.

== Early life ==
Durella, real name Oluwadamilare, (meaning: The Lord has rewarded me) was born in Zaria, Kaduna State. He grew up in Mushin and Ajegunle, and studied insurance before dropping out of school due to financial challenges.

Durella wrote his first song at age 13.

He ascribed his moniker "Durella" by saying "the street" gave it to him. Originally his nickname was Durel, but this was later changed to Durella. While he was known as Durel, he was an R&B artist and released a single titled "Why".

== Career ==
In February 2006, at a chance meeting in the town of Ibadan, Durella met executives from TcRecords while performing at a fashion show. He signed a deal a week later.

== Voice resemblance conflict ==
Critics have argued that Durella sounds like Dapo Oyebanji, popularly known as D'banj.

His musical prowess was attested by his victory at the Airtel (formerly Zain)/MTV Advance Warning Competition where he won $50,000 with the song, "Life in Zanga".

== Discography ==
Singles:

- Enu Ose
- Wiskolowiska
- Club Rock
- Life In The Zanga
- Shayo
- My LIfe
- Tonight
- Mari (2015)
- Kack It Up (2015)

Collaborations: Durella has collaborated with various stars like:

- D'banj Ibadi E Featuring Olamide, Durella and Kay Switch
- Nkiruka featuring Duncan Mighty
- Buddy Hanging featuring Olamide
- My Life featuring Terry G
- Gaga Featuring Wizkid (2011)
- Jahbless - Joor Oh Remix Featuring Ice Prince, Reminisce, Durella, Ruggedman & Eldee (2011)
- Don't Go Funny Featuring Timaya (2011)
- 2 Casket - Quest Featuring Durella (2013)
- HCode – Monster (Remix) Featuring Olamide, Durella, Dammy Krane & Shobzy.
