= Don't Dull =

Single by Wizkid

from the album Superstar
- Released: 4 December 2010
- Recorded: 2010
- Genre: Afrobeats
- Length: 4:39
- Label: Empire Mates Entertainment
- Songwriter: Ayodeji Balogun
- Producer: Samklef

Wizkid singles chronology
"Molowo Noni" (2010)	"Don't Dull" (2010)	"Familiarity" (2010)

Music video
- "Don't Dull" on YouTube

"Don't Dull" is a song by Nigerian singer Wizkid. Produced entirely by Samklef, the song was released as the third single from his debut studio album, Superstar (2011). Its production features talking drums and is infused with traditional Nigerian elements. A departure from Wizkid's teen heartthrob sound, "Don't Dull" showcases the singer's indigenous influences and street appeal.

== Critical reception ==
In a review for The Native magazine, Debola Abimbolu said the song "established Wizkid's street appeal" and called it a "cult classic".

== Remix ==
Akon was featured on the official remix. A snippet of the remix was leaked on 26 October 2011. NotJustOk reported that both parties did not set a release date. According to an article posted on the website Information Nigeria, Akon expressed interest in collaborating with Wizkid after watching him perform at an event in the UK.

== Release history ==
Country	Date	Format	Label
Nigeria	4 December 2010	Digital download	Empire Mates Entertainment
