= Cynthia Morgan =

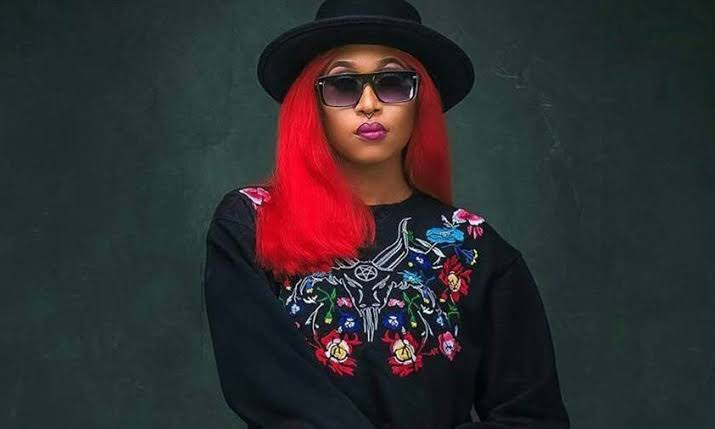

Background information
- Born: Cynthia Ikponmwenosa Morgan; 23 September 1991 (age 35); Benin City, Edo, Nigeria
- Genres: Pop, hip hop, dancehall, rap
- Occupations: Singer, song-writer
- Instrument: Vocals
- Years active: 2007–present
- Label: TCMC

Cynthia Ikponmwenosa Morgan (born 23 September 1991), popularly known by her previous stage name Cynthia Morgan, now Madrina, is a Nigerian born songwriter and singer. Her music is a fusion of pop, hip hop, dancehall and rap. She gained popularity following the release of two singles titled "Don't Break My Heart" and "Lead Me On", which received massive airplay and positive reviews from critics. Cynthia made her acting debut in 2016 Nollywood movie "The Wrong Number" Directed by Saint Joseph Ovensehi, and Ay's comedy movie 'A trip to Jamaica'.

== Early life and education ==
Cynthia Morgan was born in Benin City, Edo State where she completed her basic formal education. At the age of 3, she was a backup singer for her mother's musical band.

Reports about Cynthia Morgan’s childhood say her father abandoned them when her mother was 20 years old and pregnant. She was then raised by a single mother later became a top gospel artist in Benin City.

== Career ==
At the age of 7, Cynthia Morgan started composing songs and at the age of 17 she recorded her debut single which featured General Pype "Dutty Stepping". In 2008, she moved to Lagos to further her music career. she calls herself "Killa Marshal" which is her Ego on stage.

On 22 August 2013, Cynthia Morgan signed a recording contract with Northside Entertainment Inc. owned by Jude 'Engees' Okoye. A few months later, she released two chart-topping singles "Don't Break My Heart" and "Lead Me On" which got positive reviews from fans; the latter went on to be nominated for "Best Reggae/Dancehall Single" at The Headies 2014

On 23 May 2020, Cynthia Morgan who had not released songs for years revealed in an Instagram Live session that she lost her stage name, “Cynthia Morgan”, her VEVO account, royalties, Instagram account and other things due to the contract she signed with Jude Okoye. She stated that she became depressed after her fallout with Jude Okoye of Northside Entertainment but did not inform the public about her issues. Fans went on to donate to a GoFundMe account set up for her and Afrobeats Superstar Davido weighed in and asked her to contact him for a collaboration.

== Selected discography ==
=== Selected singles ===
- "Dutty Stepping" (2009)
- "Jhybo ft Cynthia Morgan-E jo lefero (2009)
- "Right Move" (2011)
- "High High High" & "Ojoro" (2012)
- "Don't Break My Heart" & "Lead Me On" (2014)
- "I'm Taken" (2014)
- "Popori" (2014)
- "German Juice" (2015)
- "Come and Do" (2015)
- "Simati Niya" (2015)
- "Baby Mama (2015)
- "Olowo" (2016)
- "Bubble bup" (2016)
- "In Love" (2017)
- "No camera's" (2017)
- "Summer Time" (2017)
- "Hustle" (2020)

Madrina

- "Billion Dollar Woman" (2018)
- "Lion" (2018)

=== As featured artist ===
- "Ejo le fe ro" – Jhybo ft. Cynthia Morgan (2010)
- "Bruce Lee" – TK Tycoon ft. Cynthia Morgan & Tipsy (2011)
- "Gbogbo Hustling" – Tha Suspect ft. Zee, Bigmaxx, Cynthia Morgan & Tesh Carter (2012)
- "Faaji" – Tony Ross ft. Cynthia Morgan & A-Q (2013)
- "Money" – KKTBM ft. Yung6ix, Cynthia Morgan, Tesh Carter & SD (2014)
- Give Dem" – DJ Prince ft. Dammy Krane, Mac 2 & Cynthia Morgan (2014)
- "Shoki [Female Version]" – Lil Kesh ft. Chidinma, Eva & Cynthia Morgan (2014)
- "Jamo" – Illbliss ft. Cynthia Morgan (2014)
- "Number 1" – Chopstix ft. Cynthia Morgan, Shaydee & Yung L (2015)
- "Go Gaga (Remix)" – MC Galaxy ft. Stone Bwoy, Cynthia Morgan (2015)
- "Telephone Lies" – Spydaman ft. Cynthia Morgan (2015)
- "Come Over" – Splash ft Cynthia Morgan (2016)
- "Twerk It" – Tony Ross ft. Cynthia Morgan, Phyno (2016)
- "Fine n Clean" – Jesse Jagz ft. Cynthia Morgan (2017)
- "Mosa" – Tony Ross ft Cynthia Morgan (2018)

== Selected awards and nominations ==
Year	Award ceremony	Prize	Result
2014	2014 Nigeria Entertainment Awards	Best Female Artist of The Year	Nominated
2014	2014 Nigeria Entertainment Awards	Best Rap Act of The Year	Nominated
2014	South South Music Awards	Best New Artist	Won
2014	The Headies 2014	Best Reggae/Dancehall Single	Nominated
2014	Ben TV Awards	Best Newcomer	Nominated
2014	Ben TV Awards	Best Hip-Hop Female Artist	Nominated
2014	Ben TV Awards	Best Reggae/Dancehall Artist	Nominated
2014	ELOY Awards	Best Female Artist	Nominated
2015	ELOY Awards	Music Artist of The Year	Won
2015	2015 Nigeria Entertainment Awards	Female Artist of The Year	Nominated
2015	South South Music Awards	Best Reggae/Dancehall	Won
2016	The Headies 2015	Best Reggae Single	Won
2016	The Headies 2015	Next Rated	Nominated

== See also ==
- List of Nigerian musicians
