= Empire Mates Entertainment =

Nigerian record label

- Founded: 2002; 24 years ago
- Founder: Banky W; Tunde Demuren
- Defunct: 2018; 8 years ago
- Status: Inactive
- Distributor: Self-distributed
- Genre: Various
- Location: Ikeja, Lagos State, Nigeria
- Official website: https://emeonline.com/

Empire Mates Entertainment (abbreviated as E.M.E) was a Nigerian record label founded by Banky W and Tunde Demuren in 2002. It was home to recording artists such as Wellington himself and Niyola. DJ Xclusive was the label's official DJ. Wizkid, Skales and Shaydee were all formerly signed to the label. Producers associated with the label include Masterkraft, Jay Sleek, Cobhams Asuquo, Spellz and Samklef, among others. On 18 June 2012, the label released its compilation album Empire Mates State of Mind. In addition to establishing a record label, Banky W, Segun Demuren and Tunde Demuren established a production house, a publishing company known as Muzik Men Publishing, and a charity foundation known as the I-AM-CAPABLE Charity Foundation. Banky W announced in February 2018 that E.M.E was dissolved as a record label; he said the label is now a talent management company focused on creative marketing, advertising, PR and brand events. In 2021, Banky W revived the record label, after dropping couple of singles alongside his Wife, who drop her debut single in 2022.

== History ==
Banky W and Tunde Demuren founded the record label in Albany, New York in 2002. During an interview with Beverly Bryan of MTV Iggy, Banky W shed light on the formulation of E.M.E. He said he started the label while studying at a local university in Albany. He also said he made money from singing to patrons of hair and nail salons in New York. In 2008, Banky W established E.M.E in Lagos after relocating there. He signed Wizkid and Skales to the label in 2009. DJ Xclusive, Shaydee and Niyola were all signed to the label in 2012. In an interview with Toolz on Ndani TV's The Juice, Banky W spoke about the signing process for each artist on the label. He said he signed Niyola after hearing her sing in the bathroom at his sister's wedding. He also said he signed Shaydee after the singer opened for him at a show in Ilorin. Wizkid and Skales' record deals with E.M.E came as a result of their musical exposure.

== Departures ==
=== Wizkid ===
In February 2013, Wizkid tweeted a subliminal message and tweaked his Twitter account. He also moved out of the E.M.E mansion in Lagos and acquired his own home in the Lekki Phase 1 area. Prior to Wizkid's subliminal tweets, Banky W pacified fans by assuring them that nothing was amiss. It was reported that troubles within E.M.E started as early as the E.M.E All Stars concert in 2012. On 30 April 2013, Wizkid and E.M.E reunited after contract negotiations. In the aforementioned interview on The Juice, Banky W said the dispute between himself and Wizkid was not as violent as people made it out to seem. Wizkid left the label following the release of his second studio album Ayo and expiration of his 5-year contract.

=== Skales and Shaydee ===
In February 2014, Skales parted ways with E.M.E following the expiration of his contract. According to various news outlets, Skales and E.M.E agreed to part ways. In May 2017, Shaydee announced his exit from E.M.E following the expiration of his recording contract.

== Accolades ==
E.M.E was nominated for Best Record Label of the Year at the 2013 City People Entertainment Awards.

Year	Awards ceremony	Award description(s)	Results
2013	City People Entertainment Awards	Best Record Label of the Year	Nominated

== Artists ==
=== Acts still signed to the label when it dissolved ===
Act	Year signed	Releases under the label
Banky W	2002	5
Niyola	2012	0

=== Former acts ===
Act	Year signed	Releases under the label
Wizkid	2009	2
Skales	2009	0
Shaydee	2012	1

== Discography ==
List of singles, eps and albums released under E.M.E

Year	Information
2003	Banky W. - Undeniable (EP): Released:2003; Singles: Certification:
2005	Banky W - Back in the Building: Released:2005; Singles: "My Regret"; Certification:
2008	Banky W - Mr Capable: Released:2008; Singles: Certification:
2009	Banky W - The W Experience: Released:2009; Singles:"Strong Ting", "Feeling It"; Certification:
2011	Wizkid - Superstar: Released:12 June 2011; Singles: "Holla at Your Boy", "Tease Me/Bad Guys", "Don't Dull", "Pakurumo", "Oluwa Lo Ni"; Certification:
2012	Empire Mates Entertainment - Empire Mates State of Mind: Released: 18 June 2012; Singles: "Baddest Boy", "Dance for Me", "Get Down Tonight", "Ko Mo Le", "Sun Mo Mi", "Don't Delay Me (Don't Go There)", "Change"; Certification:
2013	Banky W - R&BW: Released:14 February 2013; Singles:"Yes/No", "Good Good Loving"; Certification:
2014	Wizkid - Ayo: Released: 17 September 2014; Singles: "Jaiye Jaiye", "On Top Your Matter", "One Question", "Joy", "Bombay", "Show You The Money"; Certification:
2016	Shaydee - Rhythm and Life: Released: 25 November 2016; Singles: "Pon Da Floor", "High"; Certification:
