= Shaydee =

Nigerian singer-songwriter

- Born: Shadrach Adeboye Folarin; September 21, 1987 (age 38); Kano, Kano State, Nigeria
- Origin: Lagos, Lagos State, Nigeria
- Genres: R&B, Pop, afropop, reggae
- Occupations: singer-songwriter, vocalist
- Instrument: Vocals
- Years active: 2008–present
- Label: Empire Mates (former)

Shadrach Adeboye Folarin (born September 21, 1987), professionally referred to as Shaydee, is a Nigerian singer-songwriter and vocalist. In 2015, Shaydee was listed on notJustOk's list of "15 Artists to Watch in 2015". He is best known for his hit single titled "Won Gbo Mi", featuring vocal appearance from Wizkid.

== Early life and education ==
Born in the ancient city of Kano, Kano State, Northern Nigeria, Shaydee is the second child of four children. He left Kano with his family for Lagos at an early age. He then attended Kogi state Polytechnic for IJMB where he graduated before he transferred to Ilorin where he is a graduate of the University of Ilorin where he studied Electrical Engineering.

== Career ==
Upon his movement from Kano to Lagos, Shaydee started singing with a friend while in secondary school. In 2010, he signed a recording contract with Cackland Records and went on to release a few songs including "Love Me Like U Used 2" and "Hands in the Air". In April 2012, MI featured Shaydee on a song titled "Pain" off his Illegal Music II mixtape.

On June 11, 2012, Shaydee signed a recording deal with Empire Mates Entertainment, a move that helped launch his career further. He is often credited to have featured and written some songs off EME's compilation album titled Empire Mates State of Mind which was released in 2012. Shaydee has since worked with Ice Prince, Seyi Shay, Skales, Cynthia Morgan, Legendury Beatz among others. On November 16, 2013, Shaydee collaborated with Wizkid to release a Legendury Beatz-produced freestyle titled "Won Gbo Mi". "Won Gbo Mi" topped local music charts in the country and was widely received among music fans and critics. The video of the song was shot in Lagos and directed by Jassy Generation. It premiered on video sharing website YouTube on June 11, 2014.

On September 10, 2014, Shaydee signed an endorsement deal with Metro Taxi, a Nigeria-based taxi service company. On March 18, 2015, Shaydee released a single titled "High", a song which earned him a nomination at the 2015 edition of The Headies. Shaydee was also nominated in the "Best R&B Artist of the Year" category at the 2015 Nigeria Entertainment Awards. Shaydee is reportedly working on releasing his debut studio album titled SOS which was scheduled to be released in 2016.

== Discography ==
=== Studio albums ===
List of studio albums, with selected chart positions
| Title | Album details | Peak chart positions | | | | Certifications | Sales |
| Title | Album details | NGR | RSA | GHA | UK | Certifications | Sales |
|---|---|---|---|---|---|---|---|
| Rhythm & Life | Released: November 25, 2016; Label: Empire Mates; Format: CD, digital download | – | — | — | — | | |
"—" denotes a recording that did not chart or was not released in that territory.

=== Compilation albums ===
List of studio albums, with selected chart positions
| Title | Album details | Peak chart positions | | | | Certifications | Sales |
| Title | Album details | NGR | RSA | GHA | UK | Certifications | Sales |
|---|---|---|---|---|---|---|---|
| Empire Mates State of Mind (with Empire Mates Entertainment) | Released: June 18, 2012; Label: Empire Mates; Format: CD, digital download | – | — | — | — | | |
"—" denotes a recording that did not chart or was not released in that territory.

=== Singles ===
As lead artist

List of singles as lead artist, with selected chart positions and certifications, showing year released and album name
| Title | Year | Peak chart positions | | | | | | | | Certifications | Album |
| Title | Year | NGA | GHA | RSA | AUS | FRA | UK | US | US R&B/HH | Certifications | Album |
|---|---|---|---|---|---|---|---|---|---|---|---|
| "I Want" | 2011 | – | – | — | — | — | — | — | — | | Non-album singles |
| "My Love" | 2013 | – | – | — | — | — | — | — | — | | Non-album singles |
| "Whine For Me" | 2013 | – | – | — | — | — | — | — | — | | Non-album singles |
| "Ti E Nikan" | 2014 | – | – | — | — | — | — | — | — | | Non-album singles |
| "Far Away (Adanma)" (featuring Ayoola) | 2014 | – | – | — | — | — | — | — | — | | Non-album singles |
| "Chakam" | 2014 | – | – | — | — | — | — | — | — | | To be announced |
| "Just Incase" (featuring Kayswitch) | 2014 | – | – | — | — | — | — | — | — | | |
| "High" | 2015 | – | – | — | — | — | — | — | — | | |
| "Carry Big Load" | 2015 | – | – | — | — | — | — | — | — | | Non-album single |
| "High (Remix)" (featuring Iyanya & A-Pass) | 2015 | – | – | — | — | — | — | — | — | | Non-album single |
| "Smile" | 2016 | – | – | — | — | — | — | — | — | | To be announced |
"—" denotes a recording that did not chart or was not released in that territory.

== Awards and nominations ==
| Year | Award ceremony | Prize | Recipient/Work | Result | Ref |
|---|---|---|---|---|---|
| 2015 | The Headies 2015 | Best Vocal Performance (Male) | "High" | Nominated | |
| 2015 | 2015 Nigeria Entertainment Awards | Best R&B Artist of The Year | Himself | Nominated | |
