= Wizkid =

Nigerian singer (born 1990)

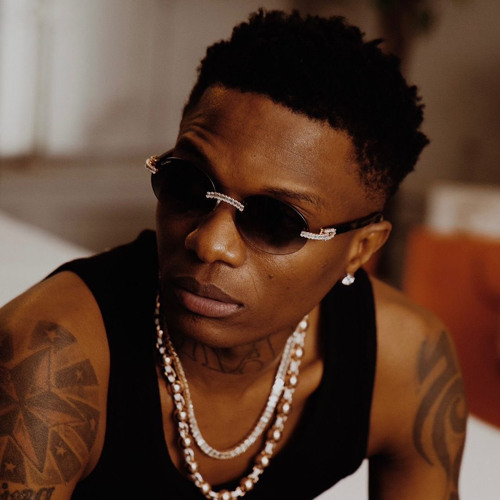
- Wizkid in 2024
- Born: Ayodeji Ibrahim Balogun; 16 July 1990 (age 36); Ojuelegba, Lagos, Nigeria
- Other names: Lil Prinz; Wizzy; Starboy; Big Wiz; Machala
- Occupations: Singer; songwriter
- Years active: 2001–present (Note: Wizkid began his singing career when he was 11 years old, in 2001. He recorded his first song with OJB Jezreel and also recorded a 7-track album under the stage name Lil Prinz.)
- Notable work: Discography
- Awards: Full list
- Musical career
- Origin: Lagos, Nigeria
- Genres: Afrobeats; afropop; R&B; afrobeat; reggae; dancehall
- Instruments: Vocals
- Labels: Starboy Records; RCA
- Website: wizkidofficial.com

Ayodeji Ibrahim Balogun (born 16 July 1990), known professionally as Wizkid, is a Nigerian singer and songwriter. Born in the Ojuelegba suburb of Surulere, Lagos, Wizkid is a voice in the emerging Afrobeats movement. His music is a blend of Afrobeats, afropop, R&B, afrobeat, reggae, dancehall, and pop. He began recording music at the age of 11 and released a collaborative album with the Glorious Five, a group he and a few of his church friends formed. In 2009, Wizkid signed a record deal with Banky W's Empire Mates Entertainment (E.M.E). He gained recognition after releasing "Holla at Your Boy", the lead single from his debut studio album, Superstar (2011), which also spawned the singles "Tease Me/Bad Guys" and "Don't Dull".

On 17 September 2014, Wizkid released the self-titled second studio album, Ayo, which was supported by six singles, including "Jaiye Jaiye". Wizkid left E.M.E. after his contract expired. In 2016, he achieved international recognition following his collaboration with Drake on the hit single "One Dance", which reached number-one on the US Billboard Hot 100 and topped the charts in 14 additional countries. The song broke multiple records, making Wizkid the first Afrobeats artist to appear in the Guinness World Records. In March 2017, he signed a multi-album deal with RCA Records and released his third studio album, Sounds from the Other Side, later that year. The album was supported by five singles, including "Come Closer" featuring Drake.

In 2019 he collaborated on the track "Brown Skin Girl" on Beyoncé's record and visual project The Lion King: The Gift, winning several accolades, including the Grammy Award for Best Music Video. In October 2020, he released his fourth album, Made in Lagos, which received commercial success and acclaim reaching number-one on the Billboard World Albums chart. The album includes the single "Essence" featuring Tems, which became the first Nigerian song to chart on the Billboard Hot 100, and reached the top ten following a remix featuring Justin Bieber. Wizkid's fifth album, More Love, Less Ego, was released on 11 November 2022. His sixth album Morayo, which is dedicated to his late mother, was released on 22 November 2024. The album broke the record for the biggest streaming debut for an African album on Spotify. In January 2026, Wizkid released the EP Real, Vol. 1 with fellow singer Asake, which spawned the Nigeria number-one hit "Jogodo".

== Life and music career ==
=== 1990–2010: Early life and career beginnings ===
Ayodeji Ibrahim Balogun was born on 16 July 1990, in Ojuelegba, Surulere, Lagos. He grew up in an interfaith household with twelve female siblings. His mother was a Pentecostal Christian and his father practices Islam. Wizkid attended Ijebu Ode Grammar School. His mother played a pivotal role in nurturing her son's musical talents, encouraging his participation in the church choir and providing him with musical instruments. Wizkid has frequently acknowledged her as his primary inspiration and strength throughout his career. He grew up listening to King Sunny Ade, Fela Kuti and Bob Marley. In a radio interview with Tim Westwood in 2012, he said that "his father has three wives". In another interview with Adesope of Factory 78 TV, Wizkid said he formed a group called the Glorious Five with a couple of his church friends. They managed to release an album prior to disbanding. Wizkid went by the stage name Lil Prinz until 2006. He later met OJB Jezreel, a record producer who prevented him from recording for a year. While visiting OJB's Point Beat Studios frequently, he watched 2 Face Idibia record songs for his Grass 2 Grace album. He was also present during the recording sessions for Sound Sultan's debut album Jagbajantis. He cited Naeto C as one of the people who mentored and coached him when he was 15 years old. Wizkid signed a record deal with Empire Mates Entertainment in 2009. He co-wrote and featured on "Omoge You Too Much", a song from Banky W.'s The W Experience album. He also worked with Naeto C, Ikechukwu and M.I while developing his craft. In mid-2009, he dropped out of Lagos State University (LASU). He later attended Lead City University, but dropped out after completing two sessions.

=== 2010–2011: Superstar ===
Wizkid began recording his debut studio album Superstar in 2009. He released "Holla at Your Boy" as the album's lead single on 2 January 2010. The song was nominated for Best Pop Single, and earned him the Next Rated award at The Headies 2011. In addition to winning the award, he was awarded a 2012 Hyundai Sonata courtesy of the organizers. Its music video was nominated for Most Gifted Newcomer Video at the 2011 Channel O Music Video Awards.

On 2 April 2010, Wizkid released "Tease Me/Bad Guys" as the album's second single. It was initially released as a freestyle rap. "Don't Dull", the album's third single, was released on 6 December 2010. Superstar was recorded in English and Yoruba. It was released on 12 June 2011 by Empire Mates Entertainment. The album incorporates elements of Afro hip-hop, R&B, dancehall, and reggae. While working on Superstar, Wizkid collaborated with record producers such as E-Kelly, Jay Sleek, Shizzi, DJ Klem, Masterkraft, Q-Beats and Samklef. The album features guest appearances from Banky W., Skales, D'Prince and Wande Coal. It was initially scheduled for release on 14 February 2011 but was later pushed back. On 12 June 2011, Wizkid hosted a launch party for the album at the Expo Hall of the Eko Hotel and Suites. The launch party featured performances from Banky W, Skales, 2face Idibia, Samklef, Wande Coal, D'Prince, Olamide, eLDee, Jesse Jagz, Ice Prince, Lynxxx and Seyi Shay. Superstar garnered Best Album of the Year at the 2012 Nigeria Entertainment Awards, and was nominated for Album of the Year at The Headies 2012.

=== 2012–2014: E.M.E tour, Ayo and other recordings ===
"Jaiye Jaiye" (2013)
A 15-second sample of "Jaiye Jaiye". The song is a fusion of Afrobeat and Afrobeats

Wizkid toured London in 2012 and performed at the Hammersmith Apollo on 4 June 2012. He worked with Banky W., Skales, Shaydee and Niyola to record E.M.E's compilation album Empire Mates State of Mind (2012). Following the album's release, E.M.E acts toured the United States. The tour kicked off in July and ended in September 2012. EME acts performed in several cities, including Houston, Dallas, Toronto, Vancouver, New York City, Providence, Calgary, Atlanta, Washington, D.C., and Chicago. On 12 November 2012, Wizkid performed at the BBC Radio 1Xtra Live 02 Academy in Brixton alongside Trey Songz, Tulisa, Kendrick Lamar and Angel.

Between 2012 and 2014, Wizkid recorded his second studio album Ayo. It features guest appearances from Femi Kuti, Banky W., Seyi Shay, Phyno, Tyga, Akon and Wale. The album's production was handled by Sarz, Shizzi, Uhuru, Del B, Dokta Frabz, Maleek Berry, Legendury Beatz and Spellz. It was initially titled Chosen. According to MTV Base, the album suffered from a pushed-back release date. It was reported earlier that the album would feature Don Jazzy, Efya and Olamide. On 6 September 2014, Wizkid revealed the album's cover art and track listing. Prior to announcing plans for a second studio album, Wizkid had plans to release a mixtape in April 2013. In an interview with Ok!Nigeria TV at Disturbing Headquarters in London, he said the mixtape would be released in April. He also said it would feature Wale and Tinie Tempah. Wizkid later announced that he would be releasing his second studio album on 12 June 2013. In an interview with HipTV, Banky W revealed the album's title and commented on the album's delay. He also gave an estimated time frame for the album's release.

On 2 May 2013, Wizkid released the album's lead single "Jaiye Jaiye". It features Grammy-nominated Nigerian musician Femi Kuti. Wizkid told Showtime Celebrity he collaborated with Femi Kuti to prevent people from depicting him as an artist whose lyrics revolve around girls, cars, and materialistic things. On 17 October 2013, he performed at the 2013 edition of Felabration, a yearly concert dedicated to Fela Kuti. The Del B-produced "On Top Your Matter" was released as the album's second single on 26 October 2013. The song's music video directed and shot in South Africa by Sesan. On 2 November 2013, Wizkid performed at the Guinness Colorful World of More concert alongside D'banj, Tiwa Savage, P-Square, Davido, Ice Prince, Burna Boy, Olamide and Phyno. The concert took place at the Eko Convention Centre in the Eko Hotels and Suites. On 23 November 2013, he performed at the Guinness Big Eruption Concert in Accra, Ghana.

In February 2014, Wizkid became the first Nigerian musician to have over one million followers on Twitter. In July 2014, Wizkid visited The Beat 99.9 FM studio in Lagos and told Toolz he had collaborated with Barbadian singer Rihanna. Wizkid was invited as a special guest for some shows on Tinie Tempah's UK tour in 2014.

=== 2015–2018: Sounds from the Other Side and the international success with "One Dance" ===
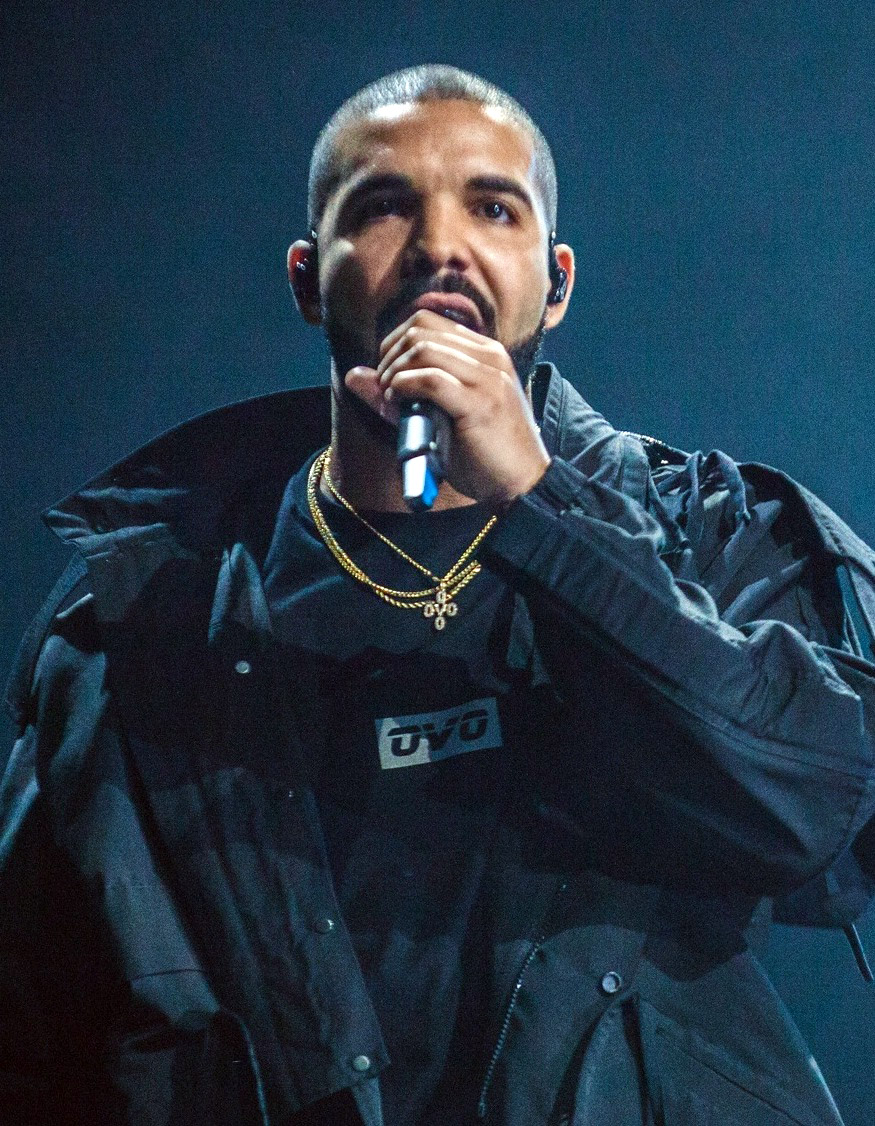
Wizkid was involved in the writing and production of Drake's "One Dance".

On 5 January 2015, Wizkid released the music video for "Ojuelegba", a song that highlights the struggles he endured in the early years of his recording career. The song's official remix features vocals from Drake and Skepta; it premiered on OVO Sound Radio in July 2015. Wizkid first announced that he was working on a new album during a visit to London in October 2014. He revealed "African Bad Gyal" as his collaborative single with Chris Brown and said it would be the lead single from his third studio album. In April 2015, both Wizkid and Chris Brown performed "African Bad Gyal" at Brown's concert in Durban, South Africa. Wizkid released "Expensive Shit", an Afrobeats song built on light guitars, saxophone lines and acoustic percussion in May 2015; the song was reported as being a likely inclusion on the album. In July 2015, Wizkid announced on Twitter that Angélique Kidjo would be featured on the album. In September 2015, he said he was dropping his EP and postponing the release of his third studio album. He made this announcement on Instagram shortly after the conclusion of 2Face Idibia's Fortified tribute concert.

On 5 April 2016, Wizkid became Nigeria's first artist to be listed on Billboards Twitter Last 24 hours chart, following his guest feature on Drake's Afrobeats-infused "One Dance" single, which charted at number 21. On 12 May 2016, the song reached number-one on the Billboard Hot 100 chart, a position it kept for 10 non-consecutive weeks. "One Dance" went on to become an international smash hit, topping charts in 15 countries, including the United Kingdom, Canada, Australia, France and Germany. The single became Wizkid's first number-one single as a featured artist in these territories.

Wizkid released the promotional single "Like This" on 5 June. The song premiered on Drake's OVO Sound Radio the same month. It was produced by Amsterdam-based Ghanaian producer DJ Henry X. Pitchfork writer Sheldon Pearce said the song is a "frolicking, summery jam that revels in all the work he [Wizkid]'s put in." In May 2015, Wizkid opened for Chris Brown on his "One Hell of a Nite" world tour.

In March 2017, he signed a record deal with RCA Records. Wizkid released his third studio album Sounds from the Other Side on 14 July 2017. Primarily a Caribbean-influenced record, SFTOS encompasses several other genres, including afrobeats, EDM, R&B, and house. The album features guest appearances from Drake, Major Lazer, Chris Brown, Ty Dolla Sign, Efya, Bucie and Trey Songz. Its production was handled by Sarz, Del B, Spellz, Dre Skull, DJ Mustard, Major Lazer, and the Picard Brothers. The album was made available for purchase and online streaming on several music platforms, including Apple Music, Amazon Music, Spotify, Deezer and Google Play. SFTOS debuted at number 107 on the US Billboard 200. It also debuted at number 58 on the Canadian Albums Chart. The album's release was preceded by three singles: "Daddy Yo" featuring Efya, "Sweet Love", and "Come Closer" featuring Drake. "African Bad Gyal" was released alongside the pre-order for the album on 9 June 2017, and "Naughty Ride" was released as a promotional track on 23 June 2017.

Wizkid became the first afrobeats artist to appear in the 2018 Guinness World Records for his contribution to "One Dance". His song "Soco" became his first afrobeats single to be certified gold in Canada. Later that year, he appeared on Normani and Calvin Harris's EP Normani x Calvin Harris, on the song "Checklist", which peaked at number one on the Billboard World Digital Song Sales chart.

=== 2019–2023: "Brown Skin Girl", Made in Lagos and international collaborations ===
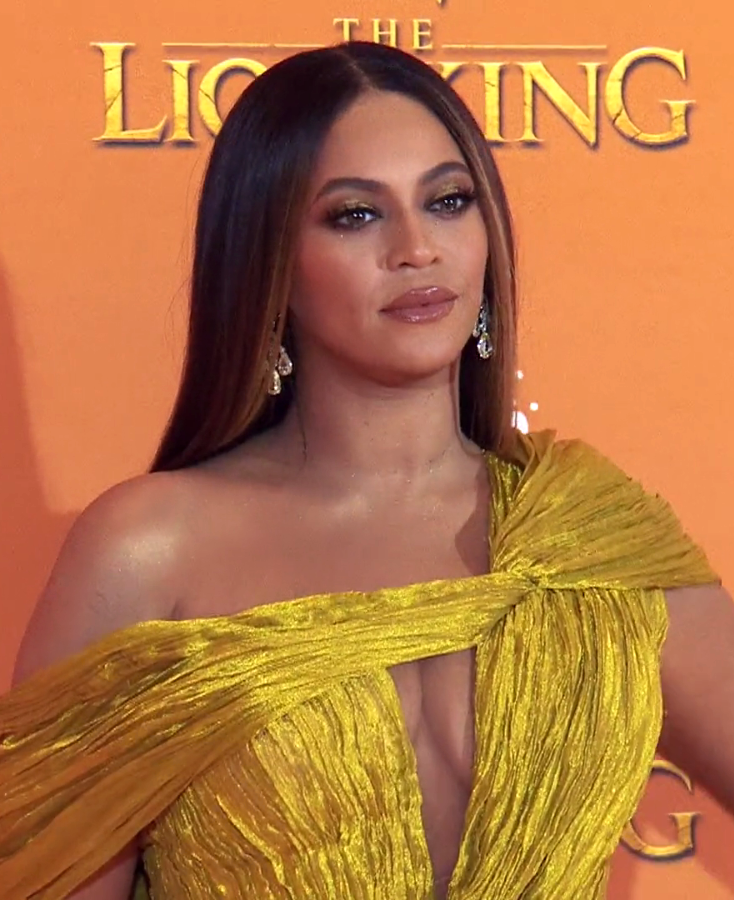
Wizkid won his first Grammy Award with his collaboration on Beyoncé's The Lion King: The Gift soundtrack.

In mid-2019, Wizkid was featured on Beyoncé's "Brown Skin Girl", taken from the critically acclaimed The Lion King: The Gift soundtrack. It was described as one of his "shining" moments of 2019, thanks to numerous nominations at major international awards, earning him two Soul Train Music Awards, an NAACP Image Award, a BET Awards, and his first Grammy Award, for Best Music Video. Later that year, he also released the singles "Joro" and "Ghetto Love".

On 6 December 2019, Wizkid's label Starboy Entertainment released the EP Soundman Vol. 1, centering mainly on Wizkid, and containing features from Chronixx, and a variety of other artists.

During 2020, Wizkid featured on various singles, including "Escape" by Akon, "Gbese 2.0" with DJ Tunes and Spax, "Eve Bounce" by Yung L, and "Consider II" with Walshy Fire. He also released a collaboration with American singer, H.E.R., titled "Smile". On 17 September, Wizkid released the single "No Stress", and announced that he would be releasing his fourth album, Made in Lagos, on 15 October 2020. The album launch was later postponed due to the Nigerian End SARS protests nationwide, until 30 October 2020. "Essence", a single from the album, became the first Nigerian song to chart on the US Billboard Hot 100. At the 27th annual South African Music Awards, Made in Lagos received a nomination for the Rest of Africa Award.

On 13 August 2021, he released a remix of "Essence", featuring Canadian singer Justin Bieber. The song became the highest-charting song on the Billboard Hot 100 by an African act, peaking at No. 11 on 4 October 2021. In November 2021, at the 64th Annual Grammy Award, his album, Made in Lagos and his song "Essence" earned him two Grammy nominations. In the same month, he also received four Soul Train Awards nominations, winning one for "Essence" for Best collaboration.

On the first anniversary of Made in Lagos, Wizkid announced his fifth album More Love, Less Ego, originally set for release on the last day of the Made in Lagos tour, 22 January 2022. On 17 June 2022 Chris Brown published the single "Call Me Every Day" featuring Wizkid, which won the NAACP Image Award for Outstanding Duo or Group (Contemporary). In September 2022, Wizkid headlined the Rolling Loud in Toronto, becoming the first African artist in history to achieve this feat. His fifth studio album More Love, Less Ego was released on 11 November 2022.

=== 2024–present: Morayo and Real, Vol. 1 ===
On 18 October 2024, Wizkid released the song "Piece of My Heart" featuring American singer Brent Faiyaz as the lead single from his forthcoming sixth studio album Morayo. In November 2024, Wizkid was nominated for Best African Music Performance at the 67th Annual Grammy Awards for his featuring on "MMS" by Nigerian singer Asake. On 22 November 2024, Wizkid released his sixth studio album Morayo of sixteen songs featuring Asake, Anaïs Cardot, Brent Faiyaz, Jazmine Sullivan, and Tiakola.

In 2025, Wizkid embarked on the Morayo World Tour, with scheduled dates across Europe, the United States, and Canada. Several scheduled dates in North America and Europe were later cancelled, although select European performances proceed as planned. In June 2025 he headline Morocco's Mawazine Festival. Though he was featured on severals singles, including "Dynamite" by Tyla, "Gimme Dat" by Ayra Starr, "Forever Be Mine" by Gunna and "Kai!" by Olamide. On December 28, 2025 he headline his music show titled GOAT: The Greatest of All Time Experience at Tafawa Balewa Square in Lagos.

On 23 January 2026, Wizkid published his collaborative EP Real, Vol. 1 with Asake, which featured the songs "Turbulence" and "Jogodo", both charted on the UK Singles Chart. Later that year, he collaborated with DJ Tunez on the single "State of Mind". In October 2026, Wizkid became the first African artist to surpass 12 billion streams on Spotify across all credited appearances.

== Endorsements ==
In 2012, Wizkid signed a one-year endorsement deal with Pepsi reportedly worth US$350,000. He travelled to Beirut, Lebanon, with Tiwa Savage for a Pepsi commercial shoot. On 28 May 2013, Premium Times reported that Wizkid had signed a one-year deal with MTN Nigeria. The newspaper also reported that Wizkid's Pepsi contract was renewed for two more years. In November 2013, Wizkid signed an endorsement deal with Guinness for the Guinness World of More concert, held at the Eko Convention Centre of the Eko Hotel and Suites on Victoria Island, Lagos. In June 2015, Pulse Nigeria reported that Wizkid had left MTN and signed a ₦128 million deal with GLO. He is the first African artist to reach one million followers on Twitter.

== Record label and contract ==
=== Empire Mates Entertainment ===
In February 2013, Wizkid tweeted a subliminal message and tweaked his Twitter account. He also moved out of the E.M.E mansion in Lagos and acquired his home in the Lekki Phase 1 area. Prior to Wizkid's subliminal tweets, Banky W pacified fans by assuring them that nothing was amiss. Furthermore, it was reported that troubles within E.M.E began as early as the E.M.E All Stars concert in 2012. It was also reported that money was at the centre of the controversy. On 30 April 2013, Nigerian Entertainment Today reported that Wizkid and E.M.E had reunited after contract negotiations. Wizkid departed E.M.E following the release of his second studio album and the expiration of his five-year contract. In a video interview with Capital Xtra in October 2019, Wizkid said he left E.M.E without any money.

=== Starboy Entertainment ===
The logo of Wizkid's Starboy Entertainment imprint

Wizkid established Starboy Entertainment in March 2013. He planned on signing new acts to the label and signed Maleek Berry and Legendury Beatz, while Berry became an in-house producer. In August 2013, Wizkid signed L.A.X to Starboy, as its first recording act. In February 2016, DJ Tunez became the in-house disc jockey, and in May 2016, Efya, R2Bees, and Mr Eazi were reportedly signed to the label. Other artists signed to the label include Legendury Beatz, R2Bees, and Terri. The label is managed by Jada P.

=== Sony Music/RCA ===
In 2017, Billboard reported that Wizkid signed a multi-album worldwide record deal with RCA Records, a subsidiary of Sony Music.

== Personal life ==
Wizkid has five children with three women. The children were born in 2011, 2016, 2017, 2022, and 2024. His first child, Boluwatife Balogun, is a recording artist under the name Champz.

=== Jane Balogun ===
Jane Balogun

Jane Dolapo Morayo Balogun (1959 – 18 August 2023) was a Nigerian pastor, entrepreneur and best known as the mother of Wizkid. She was celebrated for her unwavering support of her son's musical journey and her role as a matriarch in the Balogun family. Jane Dolapo Balogun hailed from the Shitta-Bey family in Surulere, Lagos, Nigeria. She earned a degree in Social Sciences from the University of Lagos. Balogun was a mother to four children, including Wizkid.

Affectionately known as "Mama Wizkid" among fans, Jane Balogun's legacy extends beyond her family. Her support and encouragement were instrumental in shaping Wizkid's career, and Nigerian music culture at large.

Jane Dolapo Balogun died on 18 August 2023, in London at the age of 64. Her funeral services were held on 12 and 13 October 2023, at the Redeemed Christian Church of God (RCCG) City of David in Victoria Island, Lagos.

=== Fatherhood controversy ===
In August 2011, Nigerian Entertainment Today reported that the singer fathered his first child at the age of 21. After a thorough investigation, the newspaper concluded Wizkid impregnated then-undergraduate student Shola Ogudugu. When the story broke, close friends and associates of Wizkid did not confirm it because DNA results were pending at the time. Wizkid broke his silence on the story during several interviews. In an interview with a Nigerian Entertainment Today editor, he denied having a child. In another interview conducted in Ogudu-GRA, Lagos, he said he really did not want to find himself in that peculiar situation. In December 2012, Wizkid denied the baby scandal during an interview with Nonye Ben-Nwankwo of The Punch. In October 2013, he uploaded a picture of himself and his 2-year-old son, Boluwatife Balogun, to his Instagram account. The photo confirmed the 2011 report published by Nigerian Entertainment Today.

=== Feuds ===
Wizkid became engulfed in battles on X (formerly Twitter) with several artists, including his erstwhile boss Banky W and former label mate Skales. Other artists include Davido, Dammy Krane, Saeon, Samklef, Reekado Banks, blogger Linda Ikeji. and comedian "Mr. Jollof".

=== Fashion style ===
In an interview with Alex Frank of Vogue magazine in February 2015, Wizkid said he wears a mixture of streetwear and traditional Nigerian clothing. He cited Pharrell Williams as one of his fashion icons. Moreover, he revealed plans to establish a clothing line following the release of Sounds from the Other Side.

== Legacy ==
Wizkid's work is credited for popularizing Afrobeats worldwide in the late 2010s and early 2020s. Morgan Enos of The Recording Academy praised his 2020 album Made in Lagos as a "potent mix of Afrobeats and R&B", stating that it "further accelerated the already-unstoppable surge of Nigerian music throughout the world". NotJustOk opined "The 'afrobeats to the world' movement is one that has progressed from being a trek, to a trot and now presently, a swift race, with baton tightly clenched by several star players whose sounds have sliced through the airwaves to reach international heights and by so doing, level the once seemingly unsurmountable playing field. One of such acts is Wizkid". Critics noted that Wizkid has introduced Afrobeats to a wider audience, paving the way for other African artists to reach international success.

In 2021 Billboard stated that Wizkid "is the first African artist to truly make a major pop breakthrough in the United States and seems best poised to do so globally, too". Eromo Egbejule of The Guardian Nigeria mentioned Wizkid as an inspiration for a generation of African artists, including Tiwa Savage, Davido, Mr Eazi, Maleek Berry, Tekno and Burna Boy.

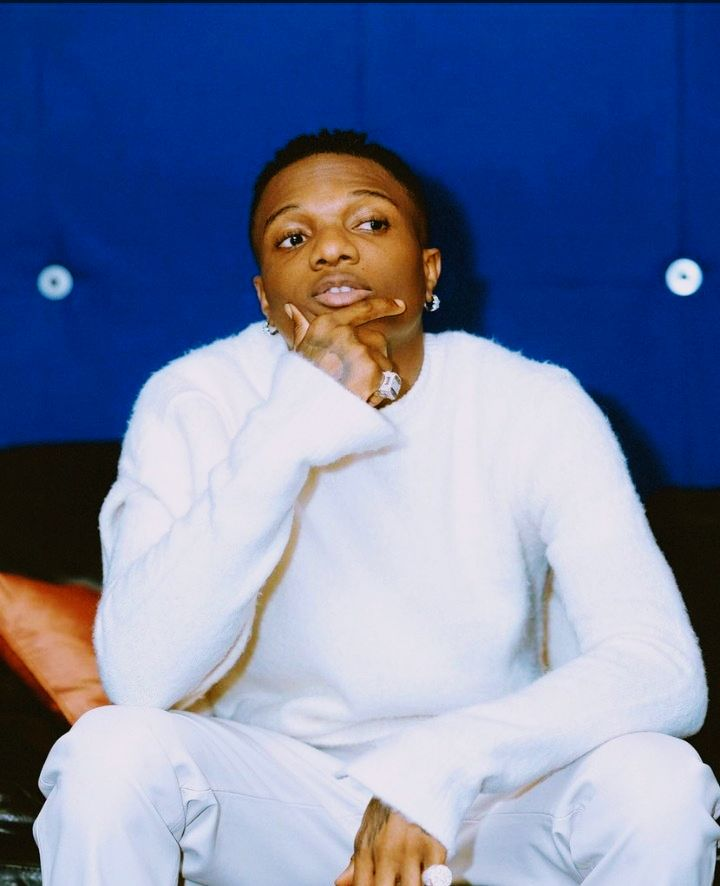
Wizkid in 2020

Poppie Platt of The Daily Telegraph said "The Afrobeats pioneer's fusion of traditional rhythms, slick R&B production and a smattering of pop-ready lyrics, sung in a mix of Yoruba and English, have helped to commercialise the genre across the West, making it one of the industry's most profitable – and brilliant – imports. ". Nicole Vassell of The Independent deemed Wizkid "king of Afrobeats", by asserting that he's "undeniably one of the reasons for the genre's mainstream appeal". Joe Coscarelli of The New York Times credited his collaborations with international artists such as Chris Brown and Major Lazer for cementing him as a "lasting international pop cultural ambassador". Former Governor of Minnesota Mark Dayton declared 6 October as "Wizkid day" in the state, stating "Wizkid has inspired Minnesotans, and music fans around the world as one of the biggest cultural influencers of our time." The Tribeca Film Festival announced the world premiere of Wizkid: Long Live Lagos, a documentary directed by Karam Gill, as part of its 2025 lineup. The film premiered during the festival, running from June 4 to June 15 in New York City.

== Awards and nominations ==
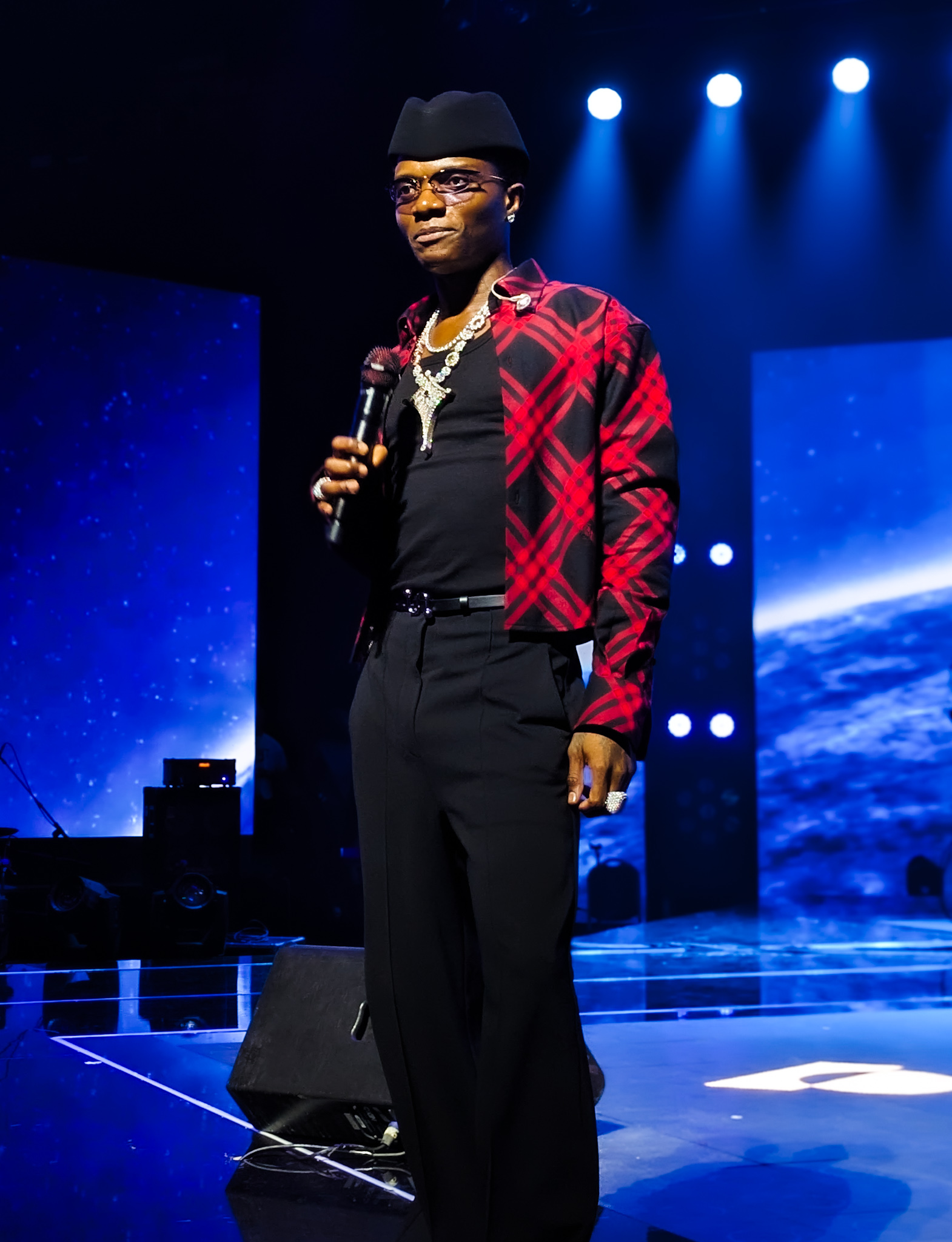
Wizkid in Canex - Algiers 2025

Wizkid's music has earned several achievements, including the Grammy Award for Best Music Video for Beyonce Brown Skin Girl"; his first ever Grammy Award. He is the most awarded African artist at the American Music Awards (2), MTV Video Music Award (1), Soul Train Awards (3), Billboard Awards (3) and iHeartRadio Music Awards (2). He is also a recipient of an ASCAP plaque for his songwriting contributions to Drake's "One Dance". Wizkid was cited as one of the Top 100 most influential Africans by New African magazine in 2019. He is also the most awarded artiste in The Headies award history. He was nominated in the Best Global Music Album and the Best Global Music Performance categories in the 64th Annual Grammy Awards for Made in Lagos Deluxe Edition and "Essence" respectively. In November 2021, Apple Music Awards announced him as the winner of Artist of the Year (Africa). He is the first African artist to win this award.

== Discography ==
Studio albums

- Superstar (2011)
- Ayo (2014)
- Sounds from the Other Side (2017)
- Made in Lagos (2020)
- More Love, Less Ego (2022)
- Morayo (2024)

== Filmography ==
List of Film & television shows, showing year aired, character played and notes
Year	Film/Television	Role	Notes	Ref.
2011	The Return of Jenifa	Himself	Movie (guest artist)	
2025	Wizkid: Long Live Lagos	Himself		

== Tours ==
- Made in Lagos Tour (2021)

=== Opening ===
- One Hell of a Nite Tour (for Chris Brown) (2016)

== Notes ==
Awards and achievements
Preceded by Skuki (2010)	Next Rated Award; 2011	Succeeded by Davido (2012)
