= Lynxxx =

Nigerian musician and entrepreneur

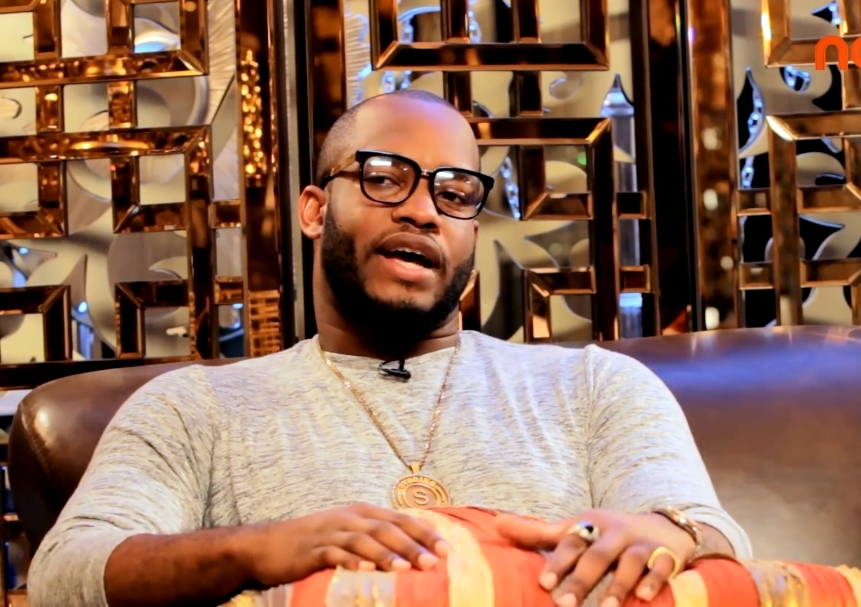

Background information
- Born: Chukie Edozien; November 24, 1987 (age 38)
- Genres: Jollof Musik, Afropop, hip hop, contemporary R&B, funky house
- Occupations: Recording artist, CEO, entrepreneur
- Years active: 2009-present

Chukie Edozien (born November 24, 1987), better known by his stage name Lynxxx, is a Nigerian hip-hop recording artist and entrepreneur. In 2010 he released his debut studio album This is Lynxxx and went on to become the first Nigerian artist to be endorsed by the global brand Pepsi. He is the originator of Jollof Musik – a genre he describes as "an artful blend of music to create great music".

== Early life ==
Lynxxx is the only son of Chief John D. Edozien, a former deputy governor of old Bendel State in Nigeria. He attended Corona Primary School Ikoyi, Lagos, and went on to study at Kings College Lagos for his secondary education. He attended the University of Hull in the United Kingdom, where he obtained a degree in Business, Economics and Marketing.

== Career ==
After ten years of behind-the-scenes work in the music industry, Lynxxx made his debut as a recording artist in December 2009, with the release of his first official single, "Change your Parade", produced by Syndik8 in-house producer and partner "IKON". The single received a lot of radio airplay and was popular in nightclubs, which helped Lynxxx cultivate a significant fan base through online media.

In December 2010, Lynxxx released his debut album This Is Lynxxx. The album featured a combination of musical genres, including urban hip hop, contemporary R&B, and infusions of funky house. Lynxxx calls this combination of different styles "Jollof Musik" - a term that refers to the art of blending various genres to make good music. That same year, Lynxxx became the first Nigerian artist to be endorsed by Pepsi.

In addition to his musical career, Lynxxx is also an entrepreneur. He established several successful businesses prior to his musical career, which include a clothing line called Syndik8 Denim, a digital recording studio called Red Room Studio, a media company called Happy Teddy Media (HTM), and Syndik8 Films.

== Discography ==
=== Studio albums ===
Year	Album title	Label	Certifications
2010	This is Lynxxx	Syndik8 Records	
2015	Jollof Musik	Syndik8 Records	
2016	The Album Before The Album	Syndik8 Records	

=== Singles ===
Year	Title	Details	Notes
2009	"Change your Parade"	featuring IKON	produced by Syndik8 in-house producer; released December 2009
2010	"Good Luvin"	featuring Wizkid	released July 2010
2010	"International"	featuring DJ Caise	released August 2010
2010	"Change your Parade"	featuring R2Bees	released December 2010
2011	"Alabukun"	featuring Banky W	released March 2011
2012	"Ice Cream Factory"		released January 2012
2012	"Follow Me"	featuring SDC	released February 2012
2012	"Fine Lady"	featuring Wizkid	released May 2012
2012	"Eziokwu"	featuring Ikechukwu, IllBliss, Phyno	released November 2012
2013	"African Bad Girl"		released July 2013
2014	"Ifeoma"		released January 2014
2014	"My Place"		released August 2014
2014	"Leave Story"		released September 2014

== Awards and nominations ==
Year	Event	Prize	Result
2010	Dynamix	Most Promising Artist	Nominated
2011	Dynamix	Best New Artist	Nominated
2011	Headies	Revelation of the Year	Nominated
2011	FAB Awards	Most Stylish Male Artist	Won
2011	Nigerian Music Video Awards	Best Afro Hip-Hop	Nominated
2012	Complete Fashion	Most Stylish Artist	Nominated
2012	SouthSouthMusic Awards	Best Collaboration "Fine Lady"	Nominated
2013	SouthSouthMusic Awards	Best Hip Hop "Eziokwu"	Nominated
