= Fela Kuti discography =

This is a discography for Fela Anikulapo Kuti, or simply Fela, a Nigerian multi-instrumentalist musician and composer, pioneer of afrobeat music, human rights activist, and political maverick.

Year	Title	Notes	Label
1970	Fela Fela Fela	Fela Ransome-Kuti And His Africa '70; made by EMI Nigeria Ltd	His Master's Voice
1971	Fela's London Scene	"FEHIN FEHINChop Teeth-Chop Teeth" / "Egbe Mi O (Carry Me) / "Who're You" / "Buy Africa" / "Fight To Finish"	Wrasse/MCA Universal
1971	Why Black Man Dey Suffer	b/w "Ikoyi Mentality Versus Mushin Mentality"	Wrasse/MCA Universal/Knitting Factory Records
1971	Live!	with Ginger Baker; "Let's Start" / "Black Man's Cry" / "Ye Ye De Smell" / "Egde Mi O (Carry Me I Want To Die)"; the 2001 CD release adds "Ginger Baker & Tony Allen Drum Solo (Live at the 1978 Berlin Jazz Festival" as a bonus track	Barclay Records/Wrasse/MCA Universal
1972	Stratavarious	with Ginger Baker; Fela and various band members are on the tracks "Ariwo" / "Iiwa (It's Our Own)" / "Something Nice" / "Ju Ju" only	Polydor Records
1972	Na Poi (Part 1&2)	b/w "You No Go Die...Unless"; paired with Yellow Fever on the 1997 CD release	Barclay Records/Wrasse/MCA Universal]
1972	Open & Close	b/w "Swegbe And Pako" / "Gbagada Gbagada"	Barclay Records/Wrasse/MCA Universal
1972	Shakara	"Lady" / "Shakara (Oloje)"	Barclay Records/Wrasse/MCA Universal
1972	Roforofo Fight: Music of Fela	"Roforofo Fight" / "Go Slow"	Barclay Records/Wrasse/MCA Universal
1972	Question Jam Answer: Music of Fela Vol. 2	"Question Jam Answer" / "Trouble Sleep Yanga Wahe Am" / "Shenshema" / "Ariya"	Barclay Records/Wrasse/MCA Universa]
1973	Afrodisiac	"Alu Jon Jonki" / "Jeun Ko Ku (Chop & Quench)" / "Eko ille" / "Je'Nmi Temi (Don't Gag Me)"	Barclay Records/Wrasse/MCA Universal
1973	Gentleman	"Gentleman" / "FEFE NAA EFE" / "IGBE"	Barclay Records/Wrasse/MCA Universal
1974	Alagbon Close	b/w "I No Get Eye For Back"	Barclay Records/Wrasse/MCA Universal
1975	Noise for Vendor Mouth	b/w "Mattress"	Barclay Records/Wrasse/MCA Universal
1975	Confusion	Confusion Part 1&2	Barclay Records/Wrasse/MCA Universal
1975	"Everything Scatter"	b/w "Who No Know Go Know"	Barclay Records/Wrasse/MCA Universal
1975	He Miss Road	b/w "Monday Morning in Lagos" / "It's No Possible"	Barclay Records/Wrasse/MCA Universal
1975	Expensive Shit	b/w "Water No Get Enemy"	Barclay Records/Wrasse/MCA Universal
1976	Unnecessary Begging	b/w "No Buredi (No Bread)"	EMI Nigeria/Wrasse/MCA Universal
1976	Kalakuta Show	b/w "Don't Make Garan Garan"; paired with Ikoyi Blindness on the 2001 CD	Barclay Records/Wrasse/MCA Universal
1976	Upside Down	b/w "Go Slow"	Barclay Records/Wrasse/MCA Universal
1976	Ikoyi Blindness	b/w "Gba Mi Leti Ki N'Dolowo (Slap Me Make I Get Money)"; paired with Kalakuta Show on the 2001 CD	Barclay Records/Wrasse/MCA Universal
1976	Before I Jump Like Monkey Give Me Banana	b/w "Sense Wiseness"	Barclay Records/Wrasse/MCA Universal
1976	Excuse O	b/w "Mr. Grammarticalogylisationalism Is The Boss"	Barclay Records/Wrasse/MCA Universal
1976	Zombie	b/w "Mister Follow Follow"; the 2001 MCA Universal CD release adds two previously unreleased cuts, "Observation Is No Crime" & "Mistake" (Live at the Berlin Jazz Festival-1978)	Barclay Records/Wrasse/MCA Universal
1976	Yellow Fever/Na Poi	1997 CD includes: "Yellow Fever" / "Na Poi (1975 version)" / "Na Poi (Parts 1&2)" / "You No Go Die...Unless"	Barclay Records/Wrasse/MCA Universal
1977	Opposite People	b/w "Equalisation of Trouser And Pant"	Barclay Records/Wrasse/MCA Universal
1977	Fear Not For Man	b/w "Palm Wine Sound [Instrumental]"	Barclay Records/Wrasse/MCA Universal
1977	Stalemate	b/w "Don't Worry About My Mouth O (African Message)"	Barclay Records/Wrasse/MCA Universal
1977	Observation No Crime	also included on the Wrasse/MCA Universal CD issue of Zombie as Observation Is No Crime	EMI Nigeria
1977	J.J.D. (Johnny Just Drop) Live!! at Kalakuta Republic		Barclay Records/Wrasse/MCA Universal
1977	I Go Shout Plenty	b/w "Frustration of My Lady"; "I Go Shout Plenty" unreleased until 1986; "Frustration of My Lady" unreleased until 1983 under the shortened title "Lady"	
1977	No Agreement	b/w "Dog Eat Dog [Instrumental]"	Barclay Records/Wrasse/MCA Universal
1977	Sorrow Tears and Blood	b/w "Colonial Mentality"	Barclay Records/Wrasse/MCA Universal
1978	Shuffering and Shmiling		Barclay Records/Wrasse/MCA Universal
1979	Unknown Soldier (Part 1 & 2)		Barclay Records/Wrasse/MCA Universal
1979	V.I.P. (Vagabonds in Power) Part 1&2 – Live in Berlin		Barclay Records/Wrasse/MCA Universal
1980	Coffin for Head of State		Barclay Records/Wrasse/MCA Universal
1980	I.T.T. (International Thief Thief) Part 1&2	paired with Original Suffer-Head on the 1997 CD	Barclay Records/Wrasse/MCA Universal
1980	Music of Many Colours	with Roy Ayers; "2000 Blacks Got To Be Free" b/w "Africa Centre of the World"	Barclay Records/Wrasse/MCA Universal
1980	Authority Stealing (Parts 1&2)		Barclay Records/Wrasse/MCA Universal
1981	Black President	"Sorrow, Tears And Blood" / "Colonial Mentality" / "I.T.T. (International Thief Thief)"	Arista Records
1982	Original Sufferhead	b/w "Power Show"; paired with "I.T.T." on the 1997 CD	Barclay Records/Wrasse/MCA Universal
1983	Perambulator	b/w "Frustration"; recorded 1977	Lagos International
1983	Lady	b/w "Lady part 2"; recorded 1977 under the title "Frustration of My Lady"	EMI
1983	Live in Amsterdam	"M.O.P. (Movement of the People) Political Statement Number 1" / "You Gimme Shit I Give You Shit" / "Custom Check Point"	Barclay Records/Wrasse/MCA Universal
1983	Fela Anikulapo=Kuti & the Africa 70	Double LP: "Alu Jon Jonki Jon" / "Chop and Quench" / "Eko Ile" / "Je'Nwi Temi (Don't Gag Me)" / "Let's Start" / "Black Man's Cry" / "Ye Ye De Smell" / "(Egbe mi O) Carry Me I Want to Die"; recorded 1971/72	EDP Records/EMI
1985	Army Arrangement	the 2001 MCA Universal CD adds "Government Chicken Boy" previously unreleased original version	Barclay Records/Wrasse/MCA Universal
1985	Army Arrangement	"Cross Examination" / "Government Chicken Boy" / "Army Arrangement"; Fela later disowned this version Produced by Bill Laswell who added session musicians to the original tracks	YABA / Celluloid Records
1986	Teacher Don't Teach Me Nonsense	b/w "Look And Laugh"; the 2001 MCA Universal CD adds: "Just Like That", a track that was left off of Beast of No Nation's CD release due to time constraints	Barclay Records/Wrasse/MCA Universal
1986	I Go Shout Plenty	b/w "Why Black Man Dey Suffer"; A-side recorded 1977	Decca Afrodisia Records
1989	Beasts of No Nation	b/w "Just like That"; b/w "O.D.O.O." on the 2001 CD release	Barclay Records/Wrasse/MCA Universal
1989	O.D.O.O. (Overtake Don Overtake Overtake)	b/w "Confusion Break Bones (C.B.B.)"; "O.D.O.O." was included on the 2001 Beasts of No Nation CD release	Barclay Records/Wrasse/MCA Universal
1992	U.S. (Underground System)	b/w "Pansa Pansa"; the 2001 CD release adds "Confusion Break Bones (C.B.B.)", which was previously the B-Side of the O.D.O.O. album	Barclay Records/Wrasse/MCA Universal
1996	Buy America		Movie Play Gold
1998	Perambulator	"Original Sufferhead" Japanese CD, also includes "Frustration" (instrumental) and "Power Show"	Victor
1999	The Best Best of Fela Kuti	re-issued in 2009 as The Best of the Black President	Barclay/Wrasse/MCA Universal/Wrasse Records (2002)/Knitting Factory Records (2009)
2001	Koola Lobitos 64–68	six previously unreleased tracks that also includes The '69 Los Angeles Sessions	Wrasse/MCA Universal
2004	The Underground Spiritual Game		Quannum Projects
2007	Anthology 1	2-CD and DVD set covering his Early Years and pre-1975 Africa 70 recordings; the DVD includes the 1984 documentary Teacher Don't Teach Me Nonsense	Wrasse/MCA Universal
2008	Lagos Baby 1963 to 1969	39 track, 2-CD set covering Fela's "Jazz & Highlife" recordings from 1963 to 1965 and his "Soul & Afrobeat" recordings from 1966–1969	Vampisoul
2009	Anthology 2	2-CD and DVD set of Africa 70 recordings from 1975 to 1980; the DVD includes the 1978 concert film Fela Live in Berlin	Wrasse/MCA Universal
2012	Live in Detroit, 1986		Knitting Factory Records, Strut Records
