= Tony Allen (musician) =

Nigerian musician (1940–2020)

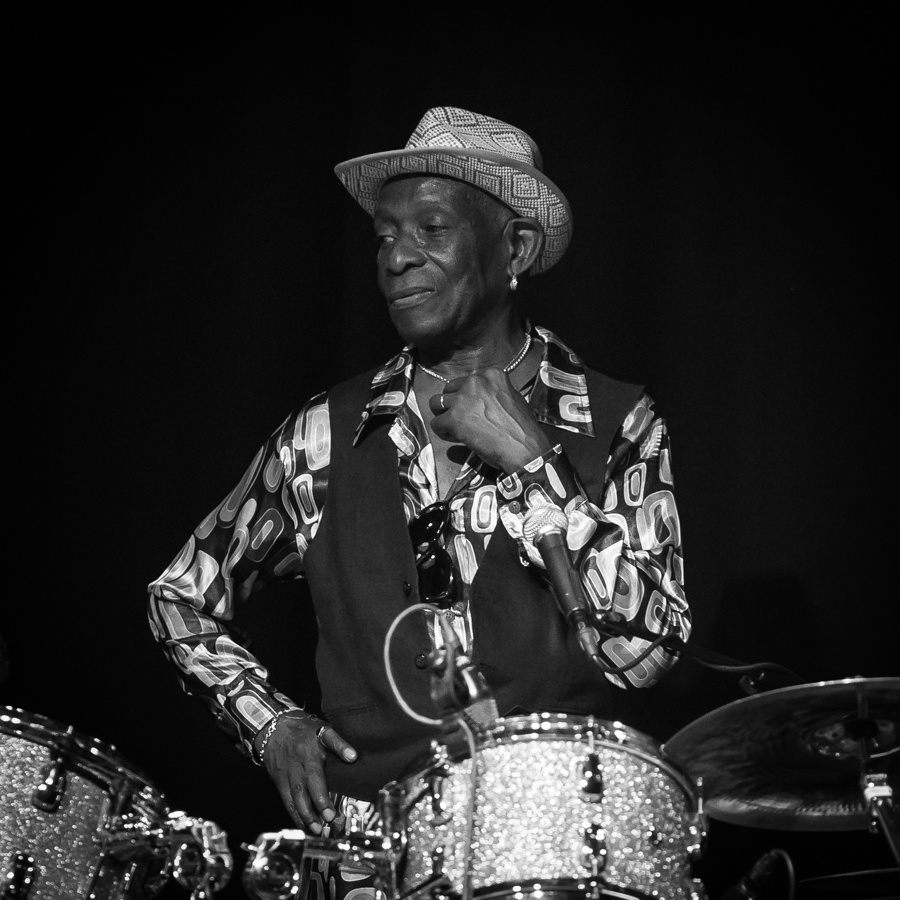
- Allen at Oslo Jazzfestival 2015

Background information
- Born: Tony Oladipo Allen; 20 July 1940; Lagos, British Nigeria
- Died: 30 April 2020 (aged 79) Paris, France
- Genres: Afrobeat; jazz
- Occupations: Drummer; composer; songwriter
- Instruments: Drums; percussion
- Years active: 1968–2020
- Formerly of: Africa '70; The Good, the Bad & the Queen; Rocket Juice & the Moon; Yannis & the Yaw

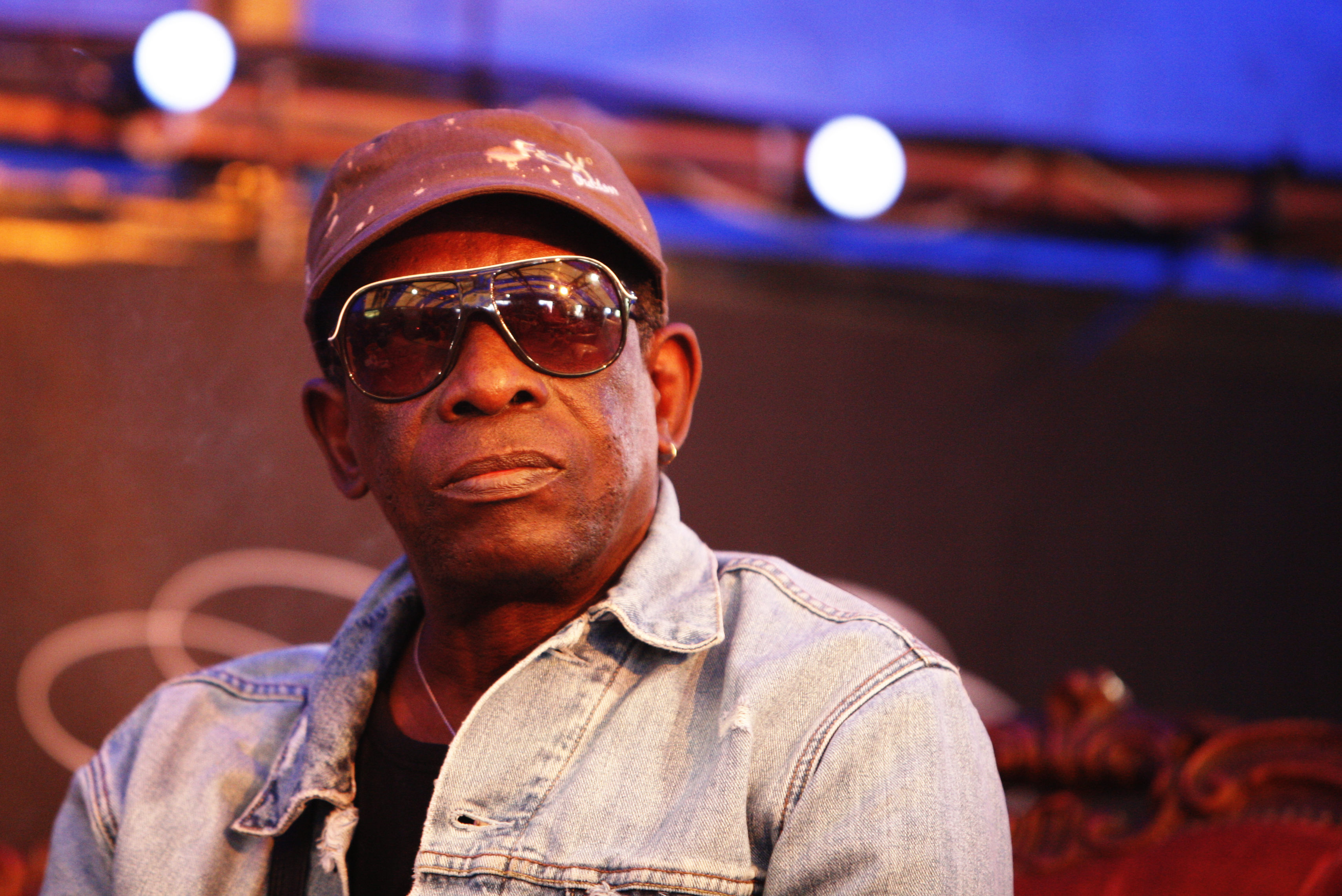
Allen at the Eurockéennes, 2007

Tony Oladipo Allen (20 July 1940 – 30 April 2020) was a Nigerian drummer, composer, and songwriter. Allen was the drummer and musical director of Fela Kuti's band Africa '70 from 1968 to 1979, and was one of the founders of the Afrobeat genre.

Fela once stated that "without Tony Allen, there would be no Afrobeat". He was described by Brian Eno as "perhaps the greatest drummer who has ever lived".

Later in life, Allen collaborated with Damon Albarn on several projects, including the Good, the Bad & the Queen and Rocket Juice & the Moon, as well as on Yannis & the Yaw with Yannis Philippakis.

== Early career ==
Allen was born in Lagos, Nigeria, to James Alabi Allen, a motor mechanic from British Nigeria (now present day Nigeria) and Prudentia Mettle, from the Gold Coast (now present day Ghana). He began playing drums at the age of 18, while working as an engineer for a radio station. Allen was influenced by music his father listened to: Jùjú, a popular Yoruba music from the 1940s, but also American jazz, and the growing highlife scene in Nigeria and Ghana. Allen studied the recordings of jazz drummers including Art Blakey and Max Roach while developing his style, as well as Ghanaian drummer Guy Warren (later known as Kofi Ghanaba who pioneered Afro-jazz).

Allen was hired by "Sir" Victor Olaiya to play claves with his highlife band, the Cool Cats. Allen was able to fill the drum set chair when the former Cool Cats drummer left the band. Allen later played with Agu Norris and the Heatwaves, the Nigerian Messengers, and the Melody Makers.

== Fela and Africa '70 ==
In 1964, Fela Kuti invited Allen to audition for a jazz-highlife band he was forming. Kuti and Allen had played together as sidemen in the Lagos circuit. Fela complimented Allen's unique sound: "How come you are the only guy in Nigeria who plays like this – jazz and highlife?" Thus Allen became an original member of Kuti's "Koola Lobitos" highlife-jazz band.

In 1969, following a trip to the United States with Fela and Koola Lobitos, Allen served as the musical director of Fela's band, Africa '70, which developed a new militant African sound, mixing the heavy groove of soul with jazz, highlife, and the polyrhythmic template of Yoruba conventions.

Allen recounted how he and Fela wrote in 1970: "Fela used to write out the parts for all the musicians in the band (Africa '70). I was the only one who originated the music I played. Fela would ask what type of rhythm I wanted to play.… You can tell a good drummer because we… have four limbs… and they are… playing different things… the patterns don't just come from Yoruba… [but] other parts of Nigeria and Africa."

Allen recorded more than 30 albums with Fela and Africa '70. But by the late 1970s, tensions were increasing among the members of Africa '70 over royalties and recognition. Fela did support Allen's three solo recordings: Jealousy (1975), Progress (1977), and No Accommodation For Lagos (1979), but by 1979, Allen had chosen to leave Africa '70, taking many members with him. "'What makes me decide it's time to go? It's … everything...and (his) carelessness...like he doesn't care, like he doesn't know ...he doesn't feel he's done anything (wrong). And with all the parasites around too.... there were 71 people on tour by now and only 30 working in the band....you got to ask why. Those guys were sapping Fela of his Force, of his Music."

== Afrobeat to Afrofunk ==
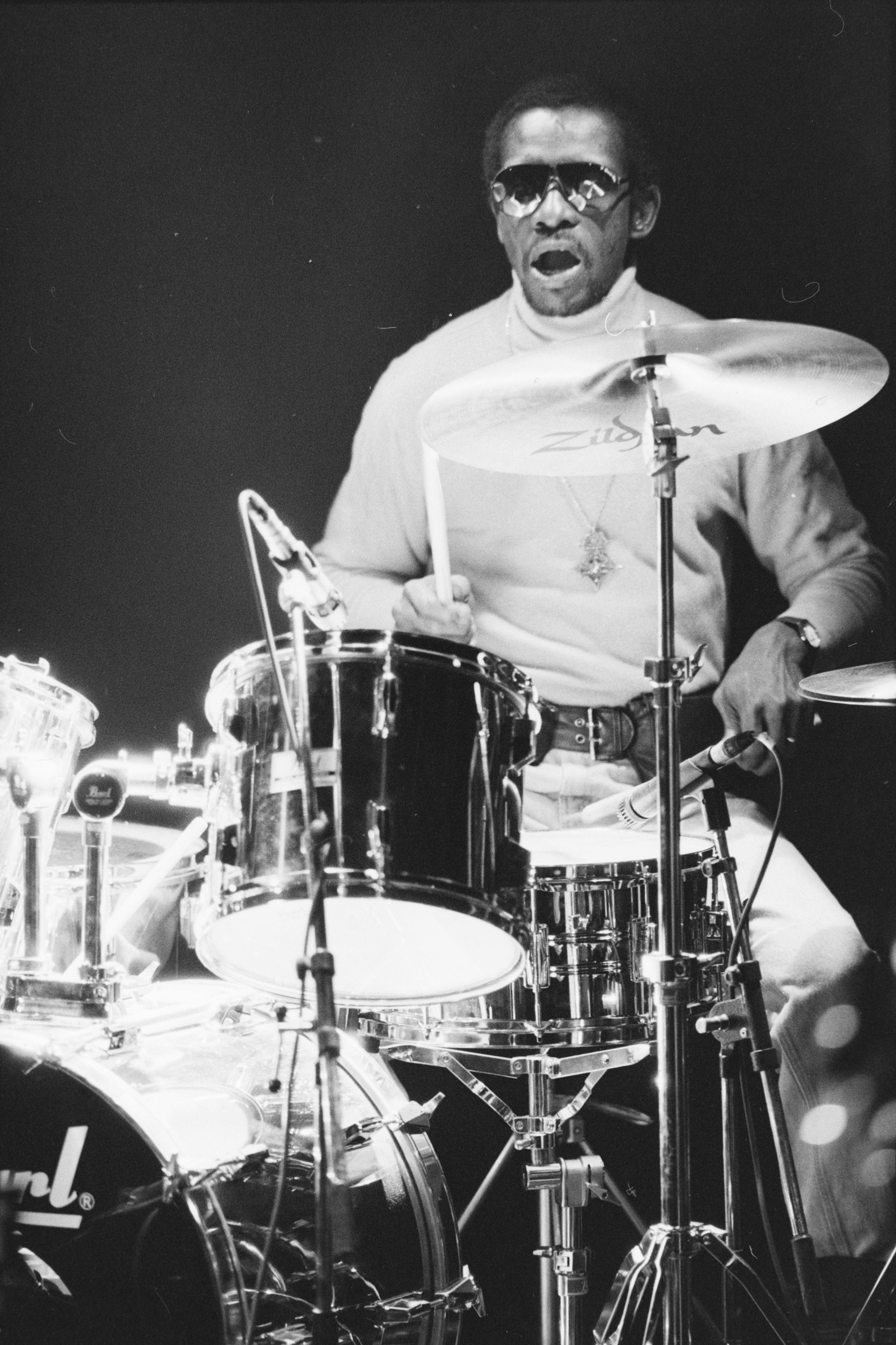
Allen in 1988

Allen formed his own group, recording No Discrimination in 1980, and performing in Lagos until emigrating to London in 1984. Later moving to Paris, Allen recorded with King Sunny Adé, Ray Lema and Manu Dibango. Allen recorded N.E.P.A. in 1985. Post-Fela, Allen’s work explored genres including Afro-funk, alternative rock, avant-garde hip-hop, electronic music, and dub.

Allen's 13th album, Lagos No Shaking (Lagos is OK) was released on 13 June 2006. Recorded live in Lagos, with a full-sized Afrobeat band, Lagos No Shaking marked Allen's return to more traditional Afrobeat sound.

== Later work ==
Allen appeared on the Red Hot Organization's compilation album Red Hot and Riot (2002) in tribute to Fela Kuti. Allen appeared alongside Res, Ray Lema, Baaba Maal, Positive Black Soul and Archie Shepp on a track entitled "No Agreement."

Allen played drums throughout the 2003 album Love Trap by Susheela Raman and also performed with her live. Allen recorded album "Live/Tony Allen" (2004) also. In 2006, Allen joined Damon Albarn, Paul Simonon, and Simon Tong as drummer for the Good, the Bad & the Queen. Allen contacted Albarn after hearing the 2000 single "Music Is My Radar" by Albarn's band Blur, which references him. They released their self-titled debut album in 2007, followed by Merrie Land in 2018. Allen and Albarn also collaborated on the 2012 album Rocket Juice & the Moon.

Allen played drums on two tracks on the 2007 album 5:55 by Charlotte Gainsbourg: "5:55" and "Night-Time Intermission", backed by French duo Air and Jarvis Cocker of Pulp. He also made an appearance playing the drums in the video for "Once Upon a Time" by French duo Air in late 2007. He was a featured artist on Zap Mama's albums Supermoon (2007) and ReCreation (2009), adding his voice to the tracks "1000 Ways" and "African Diamond." Allen also contributed drums on "People Dansa", an afrobeat rhythm-influenced track on the second album of the Brazilian singer Flavia Coelho, released in 2014. His album Secret Agent was released in June 2009 by World Circuit. He released A Tribute to Art Blakey & the Jazz Messengers (2017), a four-song EP on Blue Note Records featuring a reworked Afrobeat version of Art Blakey's "Moanin'". In 2017, Allen collaborated with Malian singer Oumou Sangaré for the track "Yere faga" from her album Mogoya.

Filmmaker Opiyo Okeyo released the documentary film Birth of Afrobeat (2019), about Allen's musical career. The film screened at American Black Film Festival and won the 21st Century Fox Global Inclusion Award for Emerging Voices at the BlackStar Film Festival. Damon Albarn and Tony Allen and band performed at a concert in the Netherlands, among then the Lowlands Festival (2019). Birth of Afrobeat was acquired by American Public Television and had its television premiere January 20, 2020 on PBS.

Allen was featured on the Gorillaz track "How Far?" (2020) alongside Skepta, as part of the band's Song Machine project. Allen contributed to seven tracks on the album Keleketla! (2020), a collaborative project co-ordinated by Johannesburg's Keleketla Library and English electronic musicians Coldcut, recorded in both Soweto and London.

Two posthumous Allen albums were released. There Is No End (2021) featured Allen on production alongside rappers and singers from around the world, including Danny Brown, Nah Eeto, and Sampa the Great. The second release after Allen's death was The Solution Is Restless, a collaborative album featuring Joan As Police Woman and Dave Okumu. 2021 also saw the release of April March's album In Cinerama, which features Allen as a drummer; he is also credited for co-writing several tracks. An EP Allen recorded with the Foals singer Yannis Philippakis, Yannis & the Yaw, was released in August 2024.

== Death ==
On 30 April 2020, Allen died of an abdominal aortic aneurysm, aged 79, at Georges Pompidou European Hospital in Paris. Tributes came from musicians and producers including Flea, Peter Gabriel, Jeff Mills, Nigel Godrich and Sean Lennon. Damon Albarn said he was his "number one musical teacher" and that he would "never, ever play with anyone like him again".

== Discography ==
Solo discography and collaborations

- Jealousy (with The Africa 70) (1975)
- Progress (with The Africa 70) (1977)
- No Accommodation for Lagos (with The Africa 70) (1979)
- No Discrimination (with The Afro Messengers) (1979)
- Never Expect Power Always (with Afrobeat 2000) (1985)
- Too Many Prisoners (with Zebra Crossing) (1987)
- Afrobeat Express (1989)
- Black Voices (1999)
- Black Voices Remixed (2000)
- HomeCooking (2002)
- Live (2004)
- Lagos No Shaking (2006)
- Secret Agent (2009)
- Inspiration Information 4 (with Jimi Tenor) (2009)
- Black Voices Revisited (2010)
- Film of Life (2014)
- A Tribute to Art Blakey & the Jazz Messengers (2014)
- The Source (2017)
- OTO Live Series (with Jimi Tenor) (2018)
- Tomorrow Comes The Harvest (with Jeff Mills) (2018)
- Rejoice (with Hugh Masekela) (2020)
- There Is No End (2021)
- The Solution Is Restless (with Dave Okumu and Joan As Police Woman) (2021)
- Tony Allen JID018 (with Adrian Younge) (2023)
- La Boa Meets Tony Allen (with La Boa) (2025)

with Fela Kuti & The Africa 70

- Fela's London Scene (1970)
- Live! (1971)
- Why Black Man Dey Suffer (1971)
- Open & Close (1971)
- Roforofo Fight (1972)
- Shakara (1972)
- Afrodisiac (1973)
- Gentleman (1973)
- Confusion (1974)
- He Miss Road (1974)
- Alagbon Close (1975)
- Everything Scatter (1975)
- Excuse O (1975)
- Expensive Shit (1975)
- Monkey Banana (1975)
- Noise For Vendor Mouth (1975)
- Ikoyi Blindness (1976)
- Kalakuta Show (1976)
- Na Poi (1976)
- Unnecessary Begging (1976)
- Upside Down (1976)
- Yellow Fever (1976)
- Fear Not For Man (1977)
- J.J.D – Live at Kalakuta Republik (1977)
- No Agreement (1977)
- Opposite People (1977)
- Sorrow Tears and Blood (1977)
- Shuffering and Shmiling (1977)
- Stalemate (1977)
- Zombie (1977)
- Unknown Soldier (1979)
- V.I.P. (1979)
- Music of Many Colours (1980)
- I Go Shout Plenty (1986, recorded in 1977)

Other appearances

- Various - Racubah! – A Collection of Modern Afro Rhythms ("Afro-Disco-Beat") (1999)
- Various - Afrobeat...No Go Die! ("The Same Blood") (2000)
- Ernest Ranglin - Modern Answers To Old Problems (2000)
- Doctor L - Mountains Will Never Surrender (2000)
- Various - The Allenko Brotherhood Ensemble (2001)
- Psyco On Da Bus - Psyco On Da Bus (2001)
- Various Artists - Red Hot + Riot: The Music and Spirit of Fela Kuti (2002)
- Bababatteur - Awa Band (2004)
- New Cool Collective - Trippin (2006)
- The Good, the Bad & the Queen - The Good, the Bad & the Queen (2007)
- Charlotte Gainsbourg - 5:55 (2007)
- Snoop Dogg & Gorillaz - "Doggumentary" (Snoop Dogg album) (featured on "Sumthin' Like This Night") (2010)
- Rocket Juice & the Moon - Rocket Juice & the Moon (2012)
- Various - The Rough Guide to African Disco ("Love Is A Natural Thing") (2013)
- Chicago Afrobeat Project - What Goes Up (2017)
- Gonjasufi - Mandela Effect (featured artist on "Etherwave") (2017)
- The Good, the Bad & the Queen - Merrie Land (2018)
- Keleketla - Keleketla! (2020)
- Gorillaz and Skepta - Song Machine, Season One: Strange Timez (Deluxe Edition) (featured on "How Far?") (2020)
- April March - In Cinerama (2021)
- Yannis & The Yaw - Lagos Paris London (2024)
- The Last Poets & The Egypt 80 - Africanism (2024)
- Gorillaz – The Mountain (featured on "The Hardest Thing") (2026)

== See also ==
- Femi Kuti
- Seun Kuti
