= Zombie (Fela Kuti song) =

1976 Afrobeat protest song by Fela Kuti

- Cover of Zombie

Song by Fela Kuti and Africa 70

from the album Zombie
- Released: 1976
- Recorded: 1976
- Studio: Kalakuta Republic, Lagos
- Genre: Afrobeat
- Length: 12:25
- Label: Coconut
- Songwriter: Fela Kuti
- Producer: Fela Kuti

"Zombie" is an Afrobeat protest song by Nigerian musician and bandleader Fela Kuti, recorded with his band Africa 70 and released in 1976 as the title track of the album Zombie. The song satirises Nigerian soldiers through the metaphor of the zombie, portraying them as blindly following military commands. Its popularity heightened tensions between Kuti and the military government, culminating in the 1977 attack on the Kalakuta Republic.

== Background ==
Kuti's political outlook was influenced by his mother, Funmilayo Ransome-Kuti, an anti-colonial activist and leader of the Abeokuta Market Women's Movement in the 1940s. His political views were further shaped during a 1969 visit to the United States, where he encountered the Black power movement and Pan‑Africanist literature. After returning to Nigeria, he increasingly incorporated political criticism more into his music and performances.

By the mid‑1970s, Nigeria had experienced a decade of military rule following a series of political coups and the Nigerian Civil War. Under General Olusegun Obasanjo, soldiers were a constant, visible presence in public life. Kuti used his music to criticise government corruption, military abuses, and social inequality in post-independence Nigeria, including in live performances and recordings such as "Alagbon Close", "Kalakuta Show" and "Ikoyi Blindness".

== Development and recording ==
"Zombie" was recorded in 1976 at the Kalakuta Republic in Lagos with Kuti's band, Africa 70. Kuti composed, arranged, and produced the track, and performed as lead vocalist, saxophonist, and keyboardist. Drummer Tony Allen provided the intricate, polyrhythmic drumming that anchored the track, a hallmark of Afrobeat.

Coconut Records released the song in Nigeria in late 1976 as the A-side of a two-track album, paired with "Mister Follow Follow", another song concerned with obedience to authority. International editions followed in 1977, including releases on Creole Records in the United Kingdom and label variations in the United States.

== Composition and lyrics ==
"Zombie" is an extended Afrobeat composition lasting 12 minutes and 26 seconds. It incorporates elements of traditional Yoruba percussion, highlife, jazz harmony, and funk rhythm structures. The track features an ostinato guitar riff, interlocking basslines, dynamic horn arrangements, and call-and-response vocal structures.

The recording opens with guitar, bass, percussion and drums. The instrumental texture changes as the ensemble's density shifts, while Kuti's saxophone provides melodic and improvisatory passages. The Guardian described the opening as a percussive guitar figure evoking West African highlife, over which Kuti's saxophone and drummer Allen's drumming gradually build, thickening the ensemble's texture.

The vocal section begins roughly five minutes into the recording and is performed mainly in Nigerian Pidgin English. The song repeatedly describes a "zombie" as a person who will not move, stop, turn or think without being instructed. One recurring line states, "Zombie no go think, unless you tell am to think," presenting the figure as incapable of independent judgment.

A later section adopts the form of a military drill. Kuti issues commands including "Attention", "Quick march", "Slow march", "Left turn", "Right turn", "About turn" and "Salute", with the chorus responding "Zombie". This structure makes the performance itself resemble the command-and-response system satirised in the lyrics. The song concludes with a reprise and a lamenting saxophone coda.

Scholars have read this structure as reinforcing the song's subject matter. The repeated patterns and shifting instrumental density turn commands, responses, and interruptions into musical events, rather than merely lyrical description, making musical form itself central to the song's political meaning.

== Release and government response ==
Upon its release, "Zombie" became widely popular in Nigeria and neighbouring countries, and became an anthem among civilians. Its public adoption undermined military authority and public deference toward armed forces personnel.

Authorities banned the song from the airwaves. People who played it publicly could face arrest or physical violence. Despite the ban, it continued to be played in homes and other public settings despite official attempts to suppress it. The release intensified an existing conflict between Kuti and the military government. Kuti had criticised government abuses before "Zombie", but the song marked an important escalation in the confrontation. The success of the track enraged the ruling military junta led by General Olusegun Obasanjo.

On 18 February 1977, an estimated 1,000 armed soldiers cordoned off and stormed the Kalakuta Republic. Kuti played "Zombie" on saxophone from the roof before the soldiers attacked. During the assault, soldiers set fire to the compound, assaulted residents, and destroyed instruments, sound equipment, and master recordings. Kuti was severely beaten, and his 77-year-old mother, Funmilayo Ransome-Kuti, was thrown from a second-story window, suffering severe injuries that led to her death in April 1978.

The attack cannot be attributed solely to "Zombie", as Kuti's conflicts with Nigerian authorities predated the song. Rather than causing the raid by itself, the song intensified the existing confrontation.

The destruction of the Kalakuta Republic later became a subject of Kuti's music, which addressed the circumstances of the attack and the government's attribution of responsibility to "unknown soldiers". In response to the raid, Kuti delivered his mother's coffin to the Dodan Barracks in Lagos, the official residence of the head of state. He went on to write protest songs detailing the attack and government denial, including "Unknown Soldier" and "Coffin for Head of State".

== Reception and legacy ==
"Zombie" remains an important work in Afrobeat and political music. The track has been performed by Kuti's sons, Femi Kuti and Seun Kuti, and covered or sampled by artists around the world. Beyoncé included thematic references to "Zombie" during her 2018 Coachella performance in tribute to Kuti. Retrospective music coverage has placed "Zombie" among the defining songs of the 1970s, and has linked it to modern West African political culture.

Other musicians have drawn on "Zombie", including Wizkid, who used the song's vocal refrain in his 2019 single "Joro", mandolinist Chris Thile, the Art Ensemble of Chicago, and Nile Rodgers and Roy Hargrove. The song was incorporated into the stage musical Fela!, which opened Off-Broadway in 2008 and on Broadway in 2009.

The podcast Fela Kuti: Fear No Man devoted an episode to "Zombie" and discussed later reinterpretations, including a version by Santigold. The episode discusses the song's continuing connection between Kuti's political themes and later musical audiences.

The song received scholarly attention because its political message is conveyed through both lyrics and musical structure. The song's political significance has been discussed as part of Kuti's broader oppositional musical practice. One study characterises the "Zombie" lyrics as oppositional expression directed at the power structures of postcolonial Africa, while another situates Kuti's music within a wider philosophy of rebellion and resistance.

"Zombie" has also remained part of ongoing public discussion in Nigeria. In 2026, it continued to be recognised as a symbol of protest, as the political and institutional concerns it addressed remained part of public debate.

== See also ==
- Military dictatorship in Nigeria
