= Shuffering and Shmiling =

Studio album by Fela Aníkúlápó Kuti and Africa 70
- Released: 1978
- Recorded: 1977 in Nigeria
- Genre: Afrobeat
- Length: 21:59
- Label: Coconut PMLP 1005 distributed by Phonogram Inc.
- Producer: Fela Kuti

Fela Kuti chronology
Sorrow Tears and Blood (1977)	Shuffering and Shmiling (1978)	Unknown Soldier (1979)

Shuffering and Shmiling is an album by Nigerian Afrobeat composer, bandleader, and multi-instrumentalist Fela Kuti. It was recorded in 1977 and released on the Nigerian Coconut label.

== Reception ==
Professional ratings
Review scores
Source	Rating
AllMusic	5/5 stars
The Rolling Stone Album Guide	3/5 stars
Spin Alternative Record Guide	9/10

AllMusic stated: "While continuing along in his tradition of savvy instrumental innovation, Shuffering and Shmiling plays out with the same intensity and voracious soloing that mark other great Africa 70 performances like Confusion, Gentleman, and No Agreement; but the point of departure here is the outward remarks he makes on a touchy topic: religion."

== Track listing ==
All compositions by Fela Kuti

1. "Shuffering and Shmiling (Vocal)" – 12:12
2. "Shuffering and Shmiling (Instrumental)" – 9:47
3. "Perambulator" – 14:30 Alternative track on 1984 French reissue

== Personnel ==
- Fela Kuti – tenor saxophone, alto saxophone, electric piano, vocals

Afrika 70

- Tunde Williams, Nwokoma Ukem – trumpet
- Christopher Uwaifor – alto saxophone
- Lekan Animashaun – baritone saxophone
- Leke Benson, Okalue Ojeah, Oghene Kologbo – guitar
- Nweke Atifoh – bass guitar
- Tony Allen (aka Ladi Alabi) – drums
- Ayoola Abayomi – percussion
- Babajide Olaleye – maracas
- Oladeinde Koffi, Addo Nettey, Shina Abiodun – congas
- Alake Anikulapo Kuti, Emaruagheru Anikulapo Kuti, Fehintola Anikulapo Kuti, Ihase Anikulapo Kuti, Kevwe Anikulapo Kuti, Remi Anikulapo-Kuti, Tejumade Anikulapo Kuti – chorus

Technical

- Musiliu P. Brimah – design
- Kenny Adamson – cartoons
