= Yellow fever (disambiguation) =

Yellow fever is an acute viral hemorrhagic disease.

Yellow fever may also refer to:

- Yellow Fever (album), a 1975 album by Hot Tuna
- Yellow Fever!, a 2006 album by Señor Coconut
- Yellow Fever (play), a 1982 play by R. A. Shiomi
- "Yellow Fever" (Supernatural), an episode of the television series Supernatural
- The Yellow Fever, a fan club for the New Zealand football team Wellington Phoenix FC
- "Yellow Fever", a song by Bloodhound Gang from their 1996 album One Fierce Beer Coaster
- "Yellow Fever", a 1976 song by Fela Kuti
- A slang term for an Asian fetish
- Le mal jaune (trans. Yellow Fever), a 1965 novel by French writer Jean Lartéguy
- "Cat's Eye / Yellow Fever (Running)", a song by Van der Graaf Generator from their 1978 album The Quiet Zone/The Pleasure Dome
