= Why Black Man Dey Suffer =

Studio album by Fela Kuti and the Africa 70 with Ginger Baker
- Released: 1971
- Recorded: 1971
- Studio: Arc Studio, Lagos, Nigeria
- Genre: Afrobeat
- Length: 28:10
- Label: African Sounds
- Producer: Fela Kuti; Ginger Baker

Fela Kuti chronology
Fela's London Scene (1971)	Why Black Man Dey Suffer (1971)	Na Poi (1971)

Why Black Man Dey Suffer is an album by Nigerian Afrobeat composer, bandleader, and multi-instrumentalist Fela Kuti recorded in 1971 and originally released on the Nigerian African Sounds label after EMI refused to release it.

== Reception ==
Professional ratings
Review scores
Source	Rating
AllMusic	4.5/5 stars

The Allmusic review awarded the album 4½ stars, stating: "Why Black Man Dey Suffer is a relatively early chapter in the Fela discography, originally recorded in 1971. Put to tape with early band Africa 70 and Cream drummer/Afro-beat enthusiast Ginger Baker on board as well, the record is made up of two extensive, repetitive, and loping pieces."

== Track listing ==
All compositions by Fela Kuti

1. "Why Black Man Dey Suffer" – 15:15
2. "Ikoyi Mentality Versus Mushin Mentality" – 12:56

== Original art cover/painting (1971) ==
Grace Okotie-Eboh Oduro

1. "Why Black Man Dey Suffer" All Rights reserved (Painting Copy write – Grace Okotie-Eboh Oduro)
2. "Reason behind the painting was to depict the slavery and exploitation of the African (Black Man) by the Jews, Europeans and the Arabs"

== Personnel ==
- Fela Kuti – electric piano, vocals
- Tonny Njoku – trumpet
- Igo Chico – saxophone
- Tony Allen, Ginger Baker – drums
