= Rejoice (Tony Allen and Hugh Masekela album) =

Studio album by Tony Allen and Hugh Masekela
- Released: 20 March 2020
- Recorded: 2010, 2019
- Studios: Livingston Recording Studios, London
- Genres: Jazz, Afrobeat
- Length: 38:13
- Label: World Circuit
- Producers: Nick Gold, Tony Allen, Hugh Masekela

Tony Allen chronology
Merrie Land (2018)	Rejoice (2020)	There Is No End (2021)

Hugh Masekela chronology
No Borders (2016)	Rejoice (2020)

Professional ratings
Aggregate scores
Source	Rating
Metacritic	82/100
Review scores
Source	Rating
All About Jazz	1/5 stars
AllMusic	4/5 stars
Evening Standard	4/5 stars
Jazz Journal	4/5 stars
The Line of Best Fit	7.5/10
Mojo	4/5 stars
Pitchfork	8/10
PopMatters	8/10
Q	3/5 stars
Uncut	4.5/5 stars

Rejoice is a collaborative jazz/afrobeat album by Nigerian drummer Tony Allen and South African trumpeter Hugh Masekela. World Circuit released the album on 20 March 2020.

== Background ==
The original sessions were recorded in London in 2010 by World Circuit's Nick Gold, who was eager to document the first recorded meeting of the two African music legends when their touring schedules coincided. After Masekela's death in 2018, additional tracks were recorded, again in London's Livingston Studios, in summer 2019. The album was released on 20 March 2020. In addition to serving as the final studio album for Masekela, it also became Tony Allen's final studio album before his death on 30 April 2020. The album contains eight tracks written by Allen and Masekela.

The track "Never (Lagos Never Gonna Be the Same)" is a tribute to Fela Kuti, through whom Allen and Masekela first met in the 1970s.

== Critical reception ==
Rejoice was met with widespread critical acclaim. At Metacritic, which assigns a weighted average rating out of 100 to reviews from mainstream publications, this release received an average score of 82, based on eight reviews, which indicates "universal acclaim". Album of the Year assessed the critical consensus as 81 out of 100 based on four reviews.

In reviewing the album, Nigel Williamson for Uncut wrote: "Warm, uplifting and fizzing with both passion and virtuosity, Rejoice is not only a fitting last will and testament from Masekela, but a glorious affirmation of music at its most potent and universal." Jazz Journal's Bruce Lindsay commented: "Ten years in the making, Rejoice was worth the wait. It's a celebratory, groove-laden, thoughtful, danceable, collection from two of the great figures in music." Joel Campbell of The Voice wrote: "'Rejoice' can be seen as the long-overdue confluence of two mighty African musical rivers – a union of two free-flowing souls for whom borders, whether physical or stylistic, are things to pass through or ignore completely." In his review for PopMatters, George De Stefano noted: "If you need something to get your socially isolated ass off the couch and up and shaking, Rejoice is the album. Even if you have to dance alone, some polyrhythmic pleasure during a pandemic is no little thing. With its deep grooves and virtuosic playing, the pairing of Allen and Masekela—overdue and sadly not to be repeated—Rejoice is a posthumous reminder of what Hugh Masekela at his best could deliver and of the now 80-year-old Allen's amazing vitality."

== Track listing ==
All tracks are written by Tony Allen and Hugh Masekela.

Rejoice track listing
No.	Title	Length
1.	"Robbers, Thugs and Muggers"	4:35
2.	"Agbada Bougou"	5:26
3.	"Coconut Jam"	3:31
4.	"Never (Lagos Never Gonna Be the Same)"	3:53
5.	"Slow Bones"	5:49
6.	"Jabulani (Rejoice, Here Comes Tony)"	5:41
7.	"Obama Shuffle Strut Blues"	4:40
8.	"We've Landed"	4:38
Total length:		38:13

== Charts ==
Chart performance for Rejoice
Chart (2020)	Peak position
Belgian Albums (Ultratop Wallonia)	145
Swiss Albums (Schweizer Hitparade)	39
