= Army Arrangement =

Studio album by Fela Kuti
- Released: 1985
- Genre: Afrobeat
- Length: 59:16
- Labels: Knitting Factory Records; KFR2041

Fela Kuti chronology
Unknown Soldier (1981)	Army Arrangement (1985)	Teacher Don't Teach Me Nonsense (1986)

Army Arrangement is a 1985 studio album by Fela Kuti.

== Background ==
The album consists of two tracks. Fela criticized the Nigerian military and the military government, documenting the period of transition from military rule back to civilian rule in the late 1970s in the track "Army Arrangement". In "Government Chicken Boy", Kuti tackles people who follow authority with obedience. It was also a period when Kuti's home came under repeated attacks.

== Production and release ==
Kuti recorded Army Arrangement with his Egypt 80 band, after which the tapes were sent to New York for mixing. Kuti was, however, arrested by the Nigerian government while attempting to leave for the United States. It was mixed by Bill Laswell with input from Sly Dunbar, Ayib Dieng and Bernie Worrell on drums and keyboard. Fela later described "Army Arrangement" as one of his least favourite tracks saying, "What Bill Laswell has done is not African music the way I hear it" and "anything that changes the natural sound of my instruments, I don't use. I will not do music with computers and electronic gadgets because African music is natural sound."

The album was originally released under the Knitting Factory Records label and has been re-released under other labels including MCA and Universal Records.

== Other releases ==
Army Arrangement was released as part of a box set of Fela Kuti's "indisputable classics" curated by Erykah Badu.

== Reception ==
Professional ratings
Review scores
Source	Rating
AllMusic	3/5 stars
Robert Christgau	A−
Tom Hull – on the Web	B+

A Pulse Nigeria reviewer described Army Arrangement as a "riveting political critique of the Nigerian military government and laced with swashbuckling instrumentation". It was considered alongside Unknown Soldier and Beasts of No Nation as one of Kuti's trifectas; "three consecutive top quality, universally acclaimed and commercially successful albums".

Spin wrote, "The guiding pulse on each song here is lucid and dramatic — less complex per haps than tracks Egypt 80 finished themselves, but no less compelling. Less is more when you're reproducing a music not your own by ear. Thus, Laswell's work on the anthemic "Army Arrangement" shows admirable restraint."

When Kuti was imprisoned, contrary to the usual intimidation of newcomers, he was welcomed to cheers at Kirikiri Prison by the inmates. He was asked to sing whilst the other prisoners clapped. He sang "Army Arrangement".

Nigerian rapper Falz sampled some lyrics from "Army Arrangement" including the repetitive use of "e no finish" on the eighth track of his 2019 studio album, Moral Instruction. It was also sampled by 2Baba on the "Jeje" track from his 2014 studio album, The Ascension.

== Track listing ==
All tracks are written by Fela Kuti.

No.	Title	Length
1.	"Army Arrangement"	30:01
2.	"Government Chicken Boy"	29:15
Total length:		59:16

== Personnel ==
- Feladey & Friends - Performer
- Jean-Pierre Haie - CD Preparation, Collection
- Fela Kuti - Composer, Primary Artist
- Fela Kuti & Egypt 80 - Guest Artist
- Bernard Matussiere - Photography
- Rikki Stein - Liner Notes, Project Administrator
