= Live! (Fela Kuti album) =

1971 live in-studio album

Live album (live-in-studio) by Fela Ransome-Kuti and the Africa '70 with Ginger Baker
- Released: August 30, 1971
- Recorded: July 25, 1971
- Studio: EMI, London
- Genre: Afrobeat
- Length: 46:50
- Label: Regal Zonophone
- Producer: Jeff Jarratt

Fela Ransome-Kuti and the Africa '70 with Ginger Baker chronology
Open & Close (1971)	Live! (1971)	Shakara (1972)

Professional ratings
Review scores
Source	Rating
AllMusic	3/5 stars
The Encyclopedia of Popular Music	3/5 stars

Live! is a live in-studio album by Fela Kuti's band Africa '70, with the addition of former Cream drummer Ginger Baker on two songs. It was released in 1971 by EMI in Africa and Europe and by Capitol/EMI in the United States and Canada. It was reissued on CD by Celluloid in 1987 and was reissued on CD in remastered form by Barclay with a bonus track from 1978.

The album was recorded on July 25, 1971, at EMI Studios (now Abbey Road Studios) in London. The British-American rock band Wings was recording their album Wild Life at the same time in the adjacent studio.

Baker travelled with Kuti into Africa in a Land Rover to learn about the continent's rhythms, as documented in Tony Palmer's film Ginger Baker in Africa (1971). The bonus track on the Barclay CD reissue features a 16-minute drum duet between Baker and Africa '70's drummer Tony Allen recorded at the 1978 Berlin Jazz Festival. The album is on Rolling Stone's list of the 50 greatest live albums of all time. The album is also included in Robert Dimery's 1001 Albums You Must Hear Before You Die.

== Track listing ==
All songs by Fela Ransome-Kuti, except where noted.

1. "Let's Start" – 8:06
2. "Black Man's Cry" – 12:12
3. "Ye Ye De Smell" – 13:55
4. "Egbe Mi O (Carry Me I Want to Die)" – 12:37

Bonus track:

1. "Ginger Baker and Tony Allen Drum Solo" – live 1978 (Fela Kuti, Ginger Baker, Tony Allen) – 16:21

== Personnel ==
- Fela Kuti – vocals, Hammond organ, electric piano, percussion
- Ginger Baker – drums (3, 4, 5)

The Afrika '70

- Tunde Williams – trumpet
- Eddie Faychum – trumpet
- Igo Chiko – tenor saxophone
- Lekan Animashaun – baritone saxophone
- Peter Animashaun – rhythm guitar
- Maurice Ekpo – electric bass guitar
- Tony Allen – drums
- Henry Koffi – congas
- Friday Jumbo – congas
- Akwesi Korranting – congas
- Tony Abayomi – sticks
- Isaac Olaleye – shekere

== Charts ==
Chart performance for Live!
Chart (2022)	Peak position
Belgian Albums (Ultratop Flanders)	180
UK Independent Albums (OCC)	35
