= Beasts of No Nation (album) =

Studio album by Fela Kuti
- Released: 1989
- Label: Shanachie
- Producer: Wally Badarou

Fela Kuti chronology
Teacher Don't Teach Me Nonsense (1986)	Beasts of No Nation (1989)	Confusion Break Bones (1990)

Beasts of No Nation is an album by the Nigerian musician Fela Kuti. It was released in 1989. Kuti is credited with his band Egypt 80.

Kuti played the title track on his 1986 North American tour and promoted it in interviews. The album sold around 15,000 copies in the United States in its first year of release.

The 2005 novel by Uzodinma Iweala takes its title from the album.

== Production ==
Beasts of No Nation was produced by Wally Badarou. Kuti began thinking about the album while in jail for infractions related to foreign currency and wrote the songs after being released. The title track accuses the Nigerian government and military of transgressions against the Nigerian populace; among other grievances, the album also condemns apartheid. Kuti's use of the phrase basket mouth acknowledges his music's responsibility to protest.

The album cover depicts P. W. Botha, Ronald Reagan, and Margaret Thatcher as horned bloodsuckers. The first line of the title track was inspired by a speech by Botha.

== Critical reception ==
Professional ratings
Review scores
Source	Rating
AllMusic	4/5 stars
The Encyclopedia of Popular Music	3/5 stars
MusicHound World: The Essential Album Guide	3.5/5 stars
The Rolling Stone Album Guide	3/5 stars
Spin Alternative Record Guide	4/10

The Gazette called the album "pan-African message music with a capital A for Anger."

AllMusic wrote: "After a few so-so records in the early '80s, Beasts of No Nation was a strong (at times stunning) return to form for Kuti and signaled that his political beliefs kept him from becoming musically lazy." In its 1997 obituary, The Philadelphia Inquirer deemed the album "blunt" and "threatening." Rolling Stone considered it "classic Afro beat."

== Track listing ==
No.	Title	Length
1.	"Just Like That"	22:54
2.	"Beasts of No Nation"	12:42
