= The Source (Tony Allen album) =

Studio album by Tony Allen
- Released: September 8, 2017
- Recorded: 2017
- Studio: Midilive Studio, Villetaneuse, France
- Genre: Jazz, Afrobeat
- Length: 64:13
- Label: Blue Note; B002721402
- Producer: Bertrand Fresel, Vincent Taurelle

Tony Allen chronology
A Tribute to Art Blakey & the Jazz Messengers (2017)	The Source (2017)	Merrie Land (2018)

The Source is an album by Nigerian drummer Tony Allen recorded in 2017 and released on the Blue Note label.

== Reception ==
Professional ratings
Aggregate scores
Source	Rating
Metacritic	83/100
Review scores
Source	Rating
AllMusic	4.5/5 stars
All About Jazz	3.5/5 stars
The Guardian	4/5 stars
Pitchfork	7.7/10

Response was positive, with Metacritic assigning the album an aggregate score of 83 out of 100 based on 9 critical reviews indicating "Universal acclaim". The AllMusic review by Matt Collar called it "an earthy, majestic, endlessly inventive album that caps both his own storied career and points the way toward the future" observing that "On The Source, he balances both his jazz and Afrobeat sides, delivering buoyant songs that are equal parts funky jams, harmonic engagements, and modal workouts". On All About Jazz, Mark Sullivan noted "African and French musicians playing American jazz, recorded on analog tape: this is fusion of a special kind". In The Guardian, John Lewis said "The Source builds on Allen’s recent mini-LP of Art Blakey covers, but this time he and musical director Yann Jankielewicz invoke other jazz legends". Pitchfork's, Ben Cardew stated "On this hybrid album of jazz and Afrobeat, long-time Fela Kuti drummer Tony Allen makes the complex sound effortless. Rarely has percussive innovation sounded this downright satisfying".

== Track listing ==
All compositions by Tony Allen and Yann Jankielewicz except where noted

1. "Moody Boy" – 6:33
2. "Bad Roads" – 5:48
3. "Cruising" – 6:01
4. "On Fire" (Allen, Jankielewicz, Jean Phillippe Dury) – 6:17
5. "Woro Dance" – 6:39
6. "Tony's Blues" – 5:00
7. "Wolf Eats Wolf" – 5:37
8. "Cool Cats" – 4:22
9. "Push and Pull" (Allen, Jankielewicz, Indy Dibongue) – 5:56
10. "Ewajo" – 5:34
11. "Life Is Beautiful" – 6:26

== Personnel ==
- Tony Allen – drums
- Nicolas Giraud – trumpet, flugelhorn
- Daniel Zimmermann – trombone, tuba
- Yann Jankielewicz – alto saxophone, tenor saxophone, baritone saxophone
- Jean-Jacques Elangué – tenor saxophone, soprano saxophone
- Remi Sciuto – flute, baritone saxophone, bass saxophone
- Jean Phi Dary – grand piano, organ, clavinet
- Indy Dibongue – guitar
- Mathias Allamane – double bass
- Vincent Taurelle – organ (track 11)
- Damon Albarn – piano (track 8)
