= Expensive Shit =

Studio album by Fela Ransome Kuti & Africa 70
- Released: 1975
- Recorded: 1975
- Studio: Arc Studio
- Genre: Afrobeat; funk
- Length: 24:13
- Label: Sounds Workshop; Editions Makossa (US)
- Producer: Fela Kuti

Fela Ransome Kuti & Africa 70 chronology
Excuse O (1975)	Expensive Shit (1975)	He Miss Road (1975)

Expensive Shit is the twelfth full-length album by pioneering Afrobeat artist Fela Kuti and his Africa '70 band, released in 1975. It was reissued in 2000 by MCA Records, packaged with Kuti's He Miss Road (1975) on the same CD.

== Background ==
Throughout the early seventies, Fela Kuti lived in the Kalakuta Republic in Nigeria, a compound that also housed his family, his bandmates, and a recording studio. Due to Kuti's vocal anti-militaristic views, the police saw him and his compound as a political and social threat, often arresting Kuti and raiding the compound.

== Music and lyrics ==
The title of the album and first track refers to an incident in 1974. The Nigerian police planted a joint on Kuti. Before he was arrested, he ate the joint, but the police brought him into custody and waited for him to produce the (titular) excrement. According to legend, he managed to use another inmate's feces and was eventually released.

The second track is inspired by a Yoruba proverb about the power of nature and the universe.

== Critical reception ==
Professional ratings
Review scores
Source	Rating
AllMusic	4.5/5 stars
Robert Christgau (2000 CD)	(dud)
The Encyclopedia of Popular Music	3/5 stars
Pitchfork (2000 CD)	8.5/10
Tom Hull – on the Web (2000 CD)	B+

In its review of MCA Records' 2000 Expensive Shit/He Miss Road CD, Pitchfork wrote "it's all too easy to get caught up in Kuti's discography. Start with Expensive Shit and don't miss the road onward." Nick Reynolds from BBC Music called it a "classic Afrobeat reissue" and said the title song is "sarcastic, hilarious and righteously angry [while] 'Water No Get Enemy' is even better with a great latin tinged sax/chorus riff." A retrospective review described the album as "vital, vibrant, fun and provocative" due to its musical innovation and pertinent social themes.

It was ranked number 78 on Pitchfork's "Top 100 Albums of the 1970s" list. In 2020, in their list of "The 500 Greatest Albums of All Time", Rolling Stone ranked Expensive Shit number 402.

== Track listing ==
All tracks are written by Fela Kuti.

Side A
No.	Title	Length
1.	"Expensive Shit"	13:13

Side B
No.	Title	Length
1.	"Water No Get Enemy"	11:00
Total length:		24:13

== Personnel ==
Adapted from LP liner notes.

- Fela Kuti – tenor saxophone, alto saxophone, piano, vocals, arrangement, composer, producer

Africa 70

- Tony Allen – lead drums
- Henry Kofi – lead congas
- Nicholas Addo – additional congas
- Issac Olaleye – maracas
- James Abayomi – sticks
- Christopher Uwaifor – tenor saxophone
- Lekan Animashaun – baritone saxophone
- Tunde Williams – trumpet, solo
- Ukem Stephen – 2nd trumpet
- Oghene Kologbo – tenor guitar
- Leke Benson – rhythm guitar
- Franco Aboddy – bass guitar

Production

- Remi Olowookere – artwork, graphics
- Peter Obe Photo Agency – photography
- Demola Odebiyi – engineer
- Roland Francis – executive producer
