= Sorrow Tears and Blood =

Studio album by Fela Aníkúlápó Kuti and the Afrika 70 Organisation
- Released: 1977
- Recorded: 1977 in Nigeria
- Genre: Afrobeat
- Length: 23:58
- Label: Kalakuta; KK 001
- Producer: Fela Kuti

Fela Kuti chronology
No Agreement (1977)	Sorrow Tears and Blood (1977)	Shuffering and Shmiling (1977)

Sorrow Tears and Blood is an album by Nigerian Afrobeat composer, bandleader, and multi-instrumentalist Fela Kuti. It was recorded in 1977 and originally released on the Nigerian Kalakuta label.

== Music and lyrics ==
Over a midtempo groove, and interspersed with Kuti's relaxed saxophone playing, the title track features him reproving what he felt was a docility among Africans in the face of political hardship. The song was written in the wake of a raid on Kuti's Kalakuta Republic compound by 1,000 armed members of the Nigerian army on February 18, 1977. The scene is described in his lyrics, "Everybody run, run, run / Everybody scatter, scatter / Some people lost some bread / Some people just die ... Them leave sorrow, tears, and blood / Them regular trademark".

The second composition is titled after the inferiority complex called colonial mentality, and whose lyrics list a range of examples of "things dem dey do, dem dey overdo all the things dem dey do" such as "think wey black no good, na foreign things dem dey like" and "dem go turn air condition, and close them country away" no be so?

== Reception and legacy ==
Professional ratings
Review scores
Source	Rating
AllMusic	3/5 stars
Robert Christgau	(1-star Honorable Mention)
Tom Hull – on the Web	A−

The AllMusic review stated: "In contrast to the hard-edged and aggressive Afro-funk that Kuti and his Africa 70 became synonymous with, both the A-side title track and B-side, 'Colonial Mentality,' are seemingly staid, in light – or perhaps because – of the cruel state-sponsored attacks that he and his extended family suffered."

The title song has been sampled by X-Clan on their 1990 song "Grand Verbalizer, What Time Is It?", Missy Elliott on her 2001 song "Whatcha Gonna Do", and Skales on his 2016 song "Temper"'s remix with Burna Boy. The American singer Bilal and the rapper Common remade the song for the former's second album, Love for Sale.

== Track listing ==
All compositions by Fela Kuti.

1. "Sorrow Tears and Blood" – 10:15
2. "Colonial Mentality" – 13:45

== Personnel ==
- Fela Kuti – tenor saxophone, alto saxophone, electric piano, vocals
- Tunde Williams, Nwokoma Jkem – trumpet
- Lekan Animashaun – baritone saxophone
- Leke Benson, Clifford Itoje, Oghene Kologbo – guitar
- Nweke Atifoh – bass guitar
- Tony Allen – drums
- Ayoola Abayomi – percussion
- Babajide Olaleye – maracas
- Oladeinde Koffi, Addo Nettey, Shina Abiodun – congas
- Alake Anikulapo-Kuti, Emaruagheru Anikulapo-Kuti, Fehintola Anikulapo-Kuti, Kewe Anikulapo-Kuti, Ronke Anikulapo-Kuti, Shade Anikulapo-Kuti, Tejumade Anikulapo-Kuti – vocals
