= The Best Best of Fela Kuti =

Compilation album by Fela Kuti
- Released: 1999
- Recorded: 1972–89
- Genre: Afrobeat
- Length: 157:43
- Labels: Barclay, Universal
- Producer: Femi Kuti

Alternate covers
- Barclay reissue, 2002

Alternative cover
- Knitting Factory Records, 2009

The Best Best of Fela Kuti is a 2-CD compilation album by Nigerian Afrobeat artist Fela Kuti, released in 1999 by MCA Records. It was issued in the United States in 2000 as part of a reissue series of Kuti's albums. The album was reissued as The Best of the Black President in 2009 by Knitting Factory Records and received universal acclaim from music critics. A companion 2-CD compilation entitled The Best of the Black President 2 was released in the U.S. in 2013 by Knitting Factory.

== Critical reception ==
Professional ratings
Review scores
Source	Rating
AllMusic	5/5 stars
Detroit Metro Times	5/5 stars
Down Beat	4/5 stars
Mojo	5/5 stars
Pitchfork	8.1/10
PopMatters	9/10
Rolling Stone (2000)	4.5/5 stars
Rolling Stone (2009)	4/5 stars
The Rolling Stone Album Guide	5/5 stars
The Village Voice	A

In a contemporary review for The Village Voice, music critic Robert Christgau said that The Best Best of Fela Kuti is the essential album from Kuti and "a masterful piece of compilation for an artist who deserves the best." He applauded the decision to edit or "unceremoniously" reduce the exhaustive lengths of the original songs in half, adding that they feature "top-notch tirades, explosive horn blasts", and riffs Kuti could "never improve no matter how often he [tried]". Christgau named it the fifth best album of 2000 in his list for the Pazz & Jop critics' poll. Vibe magazine's Harry Allen said that it has Kuti's "finest work". In 2005, Spin magazine ranked The Best Best of Fela Kuti the fourth best world music album of all time.

The album's 2009 reissue by Knitting Factory Records received universal acclaim from critics. At Metacritic, which assigns a normalized rating out of 100 to reviews from mainstream critics, it received an average score of 93, based on 5 reviews. Allmusic's Thom Jurek recommended the album even for listeners who own all of Kuti's previous music: "this is a killer mix and needs to be in the collection anyway." Michaelangelo Matos of The A.V. Club credited it for doing "the impossible by summing up a singular performer who liked his songs to jam on out to a half-hour or more.

Pitchfork critic Mike Powell wrote that, although it does not have "all of Fela's best material", the album "isn't just a good place for someone starting out, it's probably the only Fela album many will need to own." In a less enthusiastic review, Will Hermes of Rolling Stone magazine said that the music is "killer", but criticized the lack of recording info in the liner notes: "The music speaks for itself, but presidential history deserves better."

== Track listing ==
Disc one
No.	Title	Writer(s)	Length
1.	"Lady"	Fela Anikulapo Kuti	13:49
2.	"Shakara"	Fela Anikulapo Kuti	13:26
3.	"Gentleman" (edit version)	Fela Anikulapo Kuti	11:02
4.	"Water No Get Enemy" (edit version)	Fela Anikulapo Kuti	9:50
5.	"Zombie"	Fela Anikulapo Kuti	12:25
6.	"Sorrow Tears and Blood"	Fela Anikulapo Kuti	10:15
7.	"No Agreement" (Part 2)	Fela Anikulapo Kuti	7:54

Disc two
No.	Title	Writer(s)	Length
1.	"Roforofo Fight"	Fela Anikulapo Kuti	15:41
2.	"Shuffering and Shmiling" (Part 2)	Fela Anikulapo Kuti	12:25
3.	"Coffin for Head of State" (Part 2)	Fela Anikulapo Kuti	13:22
4.	"I.T.T." (International Thief Thief) (Part 2)	Fela Anikulapo Kuti	13:42
5.	"Army Arrangement" (Part 2)	Fela Anikulapo Kuti	17:02
6.	"O.D.O.O." (Overtake Don Overtake Overtake) (edit version)	Fela Anikulapo Kuti	6:54

== Personnel ==
Credits (such as they are) for the album are adapted from Allmusic.

- Fela Kuti – vocals
- Adrian Morgan – remastering
