= Fela's London Scene =

Studio album by Fela Ransome-Kuti and his Africa '70
- Released: 1971
- Recorded: 1971 at Abbey Road Studios in London, England
- Genre: Afrobeat
- Length: 44:26
- Language: Nigerian Pidgin, Yoruba, English
- Label: EMI; HNLX 5200
- Producer: Jeff Jarratt

Fela Kuti chronology
The '69 Los Angeles Sessions (1970)	Fela's London Scene (1971)	Why Black Man Dey Suffer (1971)

Fela's London Scene is an album by Nigerian Afrobeat composer, bandleader, and multi-instrumentalist Fela Kuti, recorded in England in 1971 and originally released on the Nigerian EMI label.

== Reception ==
Professional ratings
Review scores
Source	Rating
AllMusic	4.5/5 stars
Pitchfork	7.7/10
Spin Alternative Record Guide	6/10

AllMusic called the album "a stunning record that marks the beginning of Fela's best period of recording".

== Track listing ==
All compositions by Fela Kuti

1. "J’Ehin-J’Ehin" – 7:26
2. "Egbe Mio" – 13:13
3. "Who’re You" – 9:30
4. "Buy Africa" – 5:51
5. "Fight to Finish" – 7:26

== Personnel ==
- Fela Kuti – electric piano, vocals
- Eddie Faychum, Tunde Williams – trumpet
- Igo Chico – tenor saxophone
- Lekan Animashaun – baritone saxophone
- Peter Animashaun – guitar
- Maurice Ekpo – bass guitar
- Tony Allen, Ginger Baker – drums
- Akwesi Korranting, Friday Jumbo, Henry Kofi – congas
- Tony Abayomi – percussion
