= Original Sufferhead =

Studio album by Fela Kuti
- Released: 1982
- Recorded: 1981, Paris
- Genre: Afrobeat
- Label: Arista
- Producer: Fela Kuti

Fela Kuti chronology
Coffin for Head of State (1981)	Original Sufferhead (1982)	Perambulator (1983)

Original Sufferhead is an album by the Nigerian musician Fela Kuti, released in 1982.

== Production ==
Original Sufferhead was recorded in 1981 in Paris. Fela was backed by Egypt 80, which included a 10-piece horn section. The title track notes the disconnect between Africa's abundant raw natural materials and its immense poverty; it also criticizes Nigeria's acceptance of outside international organizations to address its problems. "Power Show" specifically criticizes Nigerian government officials. The album packaging shows injuries that Fela received from the Nigerian police.

== Reception ==
Professional ratings
Review scores
Source	Rating
Robert Christgau	B+
The Encyclopedia of Popular Music	3/5 stars
MusicHound World: The Essential Album Guide	3.5/5 stars
The Rolling Stone Album Guide	4/5 stars
Spin Alternative Record Guide	10/10

The Evening Advertiser considered the album "a potent synthesis of Afro-beat, soul and jazz." The Northern Echo said that "the slick and spontaneous brass is superb, particularly the trumpets".

Reviewing a 1984 reissue, The New York Times called the album "less dynamically recorded [than Black President], and its songs ebb and flow more casually"; in 2001, the paper opined that it was one of Fela's best albums. The Buffalo News stated that it is "especially potent in [a] jazz-Afro music effect". In 1991, Spin said that "the beat, a propulsive cross between salsa and Sun Ra, is hypnotically persuasive". In 2000, the Orlando Sentinel said that the title track "is tinged with melancholy but exuberant, with percolating rhythms and an electric organ that manages to sound funereal and funky simultaneously."

In 2014, Fela's son Seun Kuti chose Original Sufferhead as one of his two favorite albums by Fela.

== Track listing ==
Side 1

1. "Power Show"

Side 2

1. "Original Sufferhead"
