= The '69 Los Angeles Sessions =

Studio album by Fela Ransome-Kuti
- Released: 1970
- Recorded: February 1970
- Genre: Afrobeat
- Label: Wrasse Records

Fela Ransome-Kuti chronology
The '69 Los Angeles Sessions (1970)	Fela's London Scene (1970)

The '69 Los Angeles Sessions is a reissued album recorded in February 1970 (originally named Fela Fela Fela) while Fela Kuti was living in Hollywood performing six nights a week at the Citadel de Haiti on Sunset Boulevard, at the time run by Bernie Hamilton.

The first part, recorded with Koola Lobitos, is characterized by a Highlife sound, while the part recorded in Hollywood is distinguished by the Afrobeat sound.

== Track listing ==
KOOLA LOBITOS 64-68 (previously unreleased)

1. "Highlife Time" - 5:22
2. "Omuti Tide" - 3:50
3. "Ololufe Mi" - 5:16
4. "Wadele Wa Rohin" 4:05
5. "Laise Lairo" - 4:11
6. "Wayo" (1st version) - 4:41

The '69 L.A. SESSIONS

1. "My Lady Frustration" - 8:06
2. "Viva Nigeria" - 3:45
3. "Obe (Stew)" - 3:11
4. "Ako" - 2:40
5. "Witchcraft" - 5:25
6. "Wayo (Version 2)" - 3:27
7. "Lover" - 6:08
8. "Funky Horn" 4:42
9. "Eko Ile" - 4:12
10. "This Is Sad" - 4:23
