= Open & Close =

Studio album by Fela Ransome-Kuti and the Africa '70
- Released: 1971
- Recorded: 1971 in Lagos, Nigeria
- Genre: Afrobeat
- Length: 35:45
- Label: His Master's Voice; HNLX 5090
- Producer: Fela Kuti

Fela Kuti chronology
Na Poi (1971)	Open & Close (1971)	Live! (1971)

Open & Close is an album by Nigerian Afrobeat composer, bandleader, and multi-instrumentalist Fela Kuti, recorded in Lagos in 1971 and originally released by EMI Nigeria under the His Master's Voice label.

== Reception ==
Professional ratings
Review scores
Source	Rating
AllMusic	4.5/5 stars
The Encyclopedia of Popular Music	4/5 stars

AllMusic commented: "Perhaps the distinguishing factors of records like Open & Close and some of Fela's other '70s releases are that as much as he liked to ride a groove, he also liked to disrupt it, twist it and turn it, reshape it, only to bring it back to its original shape. There was less of that later in his career".

== Track listing ==
All compositions by Fela Kuti

1. "Open and Close" – 15:02
2. "Swegbe and Pako (Part 1)" – 5:41
3. "Swegbe and Pako (Part 2)" – 6:45
4. "Gbagada Gbogodo" – 9:17

== Personnel ==
- Fela Kuti – tenor saxophone, alto saxophone, electric piano, vocals
- Tony Njoku – trumpet
- Igo Chico – tenor saxophone
- Lekan Animashaun – baritone saxophone
- Ohiri Akigbe, Tutu Sorunmu – guitar
- Ayo Azenabor – bass guitar
- Tony Allen – drums
- James Abayomi – percussion
- Isaac Olaleye – shekere
- Henry Koffi, Akwesi Korrantin, Tony Kupoliyi – congas
