= Roforofo Fight =

Studio album by Fela Ransome-Kuti and the Africa '70
- Released: 1972
- Recorded: Lagos, Nigeria
- Genre: Afrobeat
- Length: 58:43
- Label: Jofabro
- Producer: Fela Kuti

Fela Kuti chronology
Shakara (1972)	Roforofo Fight (1972)	Afrodisiac (1972)

Professional ratings
Review scores
Source	Rating
AllMusic	4/5 stars
Record Collector	4/5 stars

Roforofo Fight is an album by Nigerian Afrobeat composer, bandleader, and multi-instrumentalist Fela Kuti recorded in Lagos and originally released on the Nigerian EMI label Jofabro in 1972.

== Track listing ==
All compositions by Fela Ransome Kuti.

1. "Roforofo Fight" – 15:40
2. "Trouble Sleep Yanga Wake Am" – 12:03
3. "Question Jam Answer" – 13:38
4. "Go Slow" – 17:22

2001 CD reissue Roforofo Fight/The Fela Singles

1. "Roforofo Fight" – 15:42
2. "Go Slow" – 17:25
3. "Question Jam Answer" – 13:41
4. "Trouble Sleep Yanga Wake Am" – 12:06
5. "Shenshema" – 9:10
6. "Ariya" – 10:18

5 & 6 are from 7" singles also released in Nigeria in 1972 on EMI, with each song split between both sides.

== Personnel ==
- Fela Kuti – tenor saxophone, alto saxophone, vocals
- Tunde Williams – trumpet
- Christopher Uwaifor – tenor saxophone
- Lekan Animashaun – baritone saxophone
- Segun Edo, Tutu Shorunmu – guitar
- George Bruce – bass guitar
- Tony Allen – drums
- James Abayomi – percussion
