= Shakara (album) =

Studio album by Fela Ransome-Kuti and the Africa '70
- Released: 1972
- Recorded: 1972 in Lagos, Nigeria
- Genre: Afrobeat
- Length: 27:13
- Label: EMI; 008N
- Producer: Fela Kuti

Fela Kuti chronology
Live! (1971)	Shakara (1972)	Roforofo Fight (1972)

Shakara is an album by Nigerian Afrobeat composer, bandleader, and multi-instrumentalist Fela Kuti, recorded in Lagos in 1971 and originally released on the Nigerian EMI label.

== Reception ==
Professional ratings
Review scores
Source	Rating
AllMusic	4.5/5 stars
The Encyclopedia of Popular Music	3/5 stars
Pitchfork	7.8/10

AllMusic commented: "Kuti was highly eclectic, and his innovative, visionary music contained elements of funk/soul, jazz, and blues, as well as African music. That eclectic spirit proves to be a major asset on Shakara, which consists of two 13-minute performances by Kuti's Africa 70 band".

== Track listing ==
All compositions by Fela Kuti

1. "Lady" – 13:47
2. "Shakara (Oloje)" – 13:26

== Personnel ==
- Fela Kuti – tenor saxophone, alto saxophone, electric piano, vocals
- Tony Njoku – trumpet
- Igo Chico – tenor saxophone
- Lekan Animashaun – baritone saxophone
- Segun Edo, Tutu Shorunmu – guitar
- Tommy James – bass guitar
- Tony Allen – drums
- James Abayomi – percussion
- Isaac Olaleye – maracas
- Henry Koffi, Daniel Koranteg – congas
