= Afrodisiac (Fela Kuti album) =

Studio album by Fela Ransome-Kuti and the Africa '70
- Released: 1973
- Recorded: 1972 at Abbey Road Studios
- Genre: Afrobeat
- Length: 39:51
- Label: EMI; EMI 062
- Producer: Jeff Jarratt

Fela Kuti chronology
Roforofo Fight (1972)	Afrodisiac (1973)	Gentleman (1973)

Afrodisiac is an album by Nigerian Afrobeat composer, bandleader, and multi-instrumentalist Fela Kuti, originally released on the Nigerian EMI label in 1973. The album's four tracks were re-recordings of Nigerian 45s redone in London in 1972. The album features Kuti's first Nigerian hit "Jeun Ko Ku," which sold over 200,000 copies.

Professional ratings
Review scores
Source	Rating
AllMusic	4/5 stars
Pitchfork	8.6/10

AllMusic stated that "These four workouts [...] are propulsive mixtures of funk and African music, avoiding the homogeneity of much funk and African records of later vintage, done with nonstop high energy. The interplay between horns, electric keyboards, drums, and Fela's exuberant vocals gives this a jazz character, without sacrificing the earthiness that makes it danceable as well".

The album later served as both an inspiration and a template for American post-punk band Talking Heads' fourth studio album Remain in Light (1980).

== Track listing ==
All compositions by Fela Kuti.

1. "Alu Jon Jonki Jon" – 12:41
2. "Jeun Ko Ku (Chop & Quench)" – 7:14
3. "Eko Ile" – 6:41
4. "Je'nwi Temi (Don't Gag Me)" – 13:15

== Personnel ==
- Fela Kuti – tenor saxophone, alto saxophone, electric piano, vocals
- Eddie Faychum, Tunde Williams – trumpet
- Igo Chico – tenor saxophone
- Lekan Animashaun – baritone saxophone
- Peter Animashaun – guitar
- Maurice Ekpo – bass guitar
- Tony Allen – drums
- Tony Abayomi – percussion
- Isaac Olaleye – shekere
- Henry Koffi, Akwesi Korranting, Friday Jumbo – congas
