= Zombie (album) =

1977 album by Fela Kuti

Studio album by Fela Anikulapo Kuti
- Released: 1976
- Genre: Afrobeat
- Length: 25:24 (Original LP); 53:41 (CD Reissue)
- Label: Coconut
- Producer: Fela Kuti

Fela Anikulapo Kuti chronology
He Miss Road (1975)	Zombie (1976)	Stalemate (1977)

Zombie is a studio album by Nigerian Afrobeat musician Fela Kuti. It was released in Nigeria by Coconut Records in 1976, and in the United Kingdom by Creole Records in 1977.

The album criticised the Nigerian government; and it is thought to have resulted in the murder of Kuti's mother Funmilayo Ransome-Kuti, and the destruction of his commune by the military.

== Controversy and fallout ==
The album was a scathing attack on Nigerian soldiers using the zombie metaphor to describe the methods of the Nigerian military. The album was a smash hit with the people and infuriated the government, setting off a vicious attack against the Kalakuta Republic (a commune that Kuti had established in Nigeria), during which one thousand soldiers attacked the commune. Kuti was severely beaten, and his elderly mother Funmilayo Ransome-Kuti was thrown from a window, causing fatal injuries. The Kalakuta Republic was burned, and Kuti's studio, instruments, and master tapes were destroyed. Kuti claimed that he would have been killed if it were not for the intervention of a commanding officer as he was being beaten. Kuti's response to the attack was to deliver his mother's coffin to the main army barrack in Lagos and write two songs, "Coffin for Head of State" and "Unknown Soldier", referencing the official inquiry that claimed the commune had been destroyed by an unknown soldier.

Kuti and his band then took residence in Crossroads Hotel as the Shrine had been destroyed along with his commune. In 1978 Kuti married 27 women, many of whom were his dancers, composers, and singers to mark the anniversary of the attack on the Kalakuta Republic. Later, he was to adopt a rotation system of keeping only twelve simultaneous wives. The year was also marked by two notorious concerts. The first was in Accra, where riots broke out during the song "Zombie," which led to Kuti being banned from entering Ghana. The second was at the Berlin Jazz Festival, after which most of Kuti's musicians deserted him, due to rumors that Kuti was planning to use the entirety of the proceeds to fund his presidential campaign.

== Critical reception ==
Professional ratings
Review scores
Source	Rating
AllMusic	4.5/5 stars
Christgau's Record Guide	A−
DownBeat	4.5/5 stars
The Rolling Stone Album Guide	4/5 stars

Reviewing Zombie in Christgau's Record Guide: Rock Albums of the Seventies (1981), Robert Christgau said Kuti's English lyrics are "very political" and "associative" while the sound is "real fusion music — if James Brown's stuff is Afro-American, his is American-African." AllMusic's Sam Samuelson called the album Kuti and Africa 70's "most popular and impacting record". Pitchfork ranked it number 90 on their list of the 100 best albums of the 1970s. It was ranked number 19 in Treble Magazine's top 150 albums of the '70s.

The album was included in Robert Dimery's 2005 book 1001 Albums You Must Hear Before You Die. In 2025, Zombie was the first Nigerian album inducted into the Grammy Hall of Fame.

== Track listing ==
All tracks are written by Fela Kuti.

Original LP
No.	Title	Length
1.	"Zombie"	12:26
2.	"Mister Follow Follow"	12:58
Total length:		25:24

CD Reissue bonus tracks
No.	Title	Length
3.	"Observation Is No Crime"	13:26
4.	"Mistake" (Live at the Berlin Jazz Festival, 1978)	14:47
Total length:		53:41

== See also ==
- List of anti-war songs
