= Fela Kuti =

Nigerian musician and activist (1938–1997)

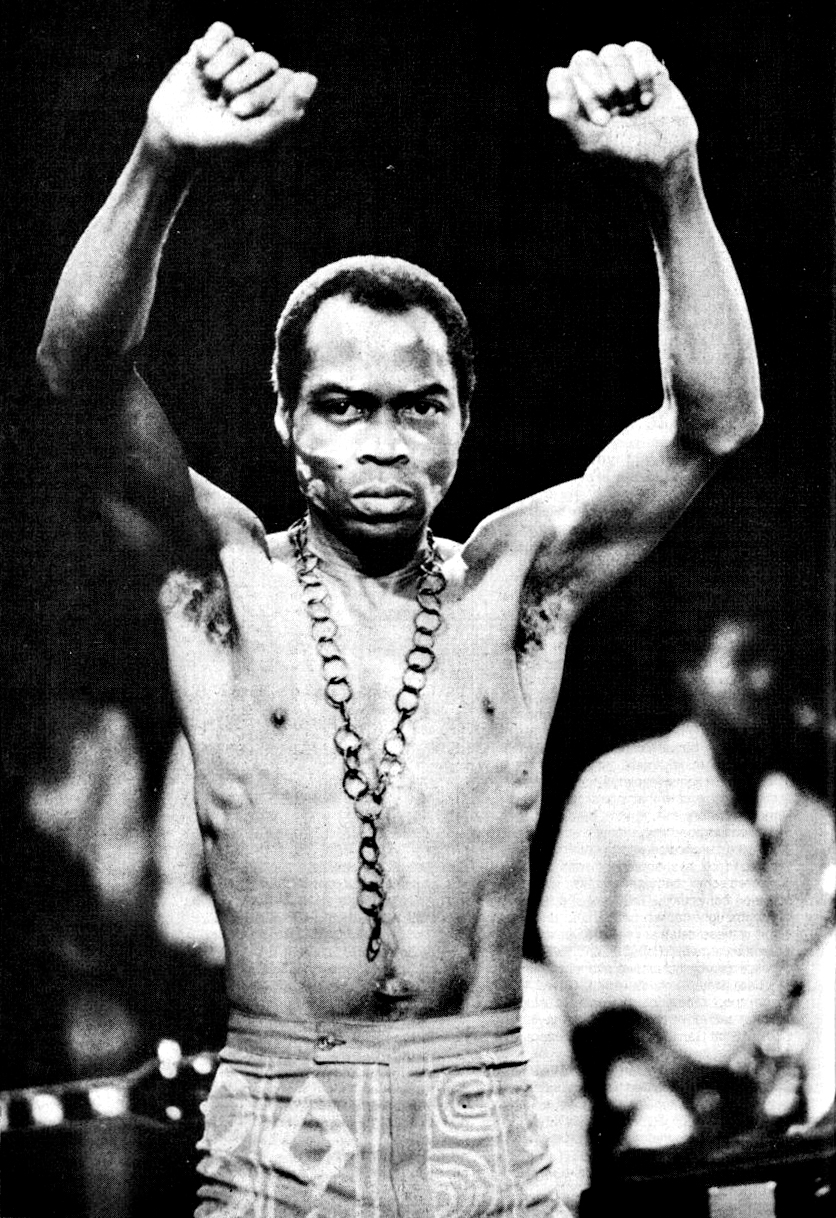
- Kuti c. 1986
- Born: Olufela Olusegun Oludotun Ransome-Kuti; 15 October 1938; Abeokuta, British Nigeria
- Died: 2 August 1997 (aged 58); Lagos, Lagos State, Nigeria
- Occupations: Musician; bandleader; political activist
- Years active: 1958–1997
- Notable work: Discography
- Children: Yeni Kuti (daughter); Femi Kuti (son); Seun Kuti (son)
- Parents: Israel Oludotun Ransome-Kuti (father); Funmilayo Ransome-Kuti (mother)
- Family: Ransome-Kuti family Lijadu Sisters (cousins); Made Kuti (grandson) Wole Soyinka (cousin)
- Musical career
- Origin: Lagos, Nigeria
- Genre: Afrobeat
- Instruments: Vocals; keyboards; saxophone; trumpet; guitar; drums
- Labels: Barclay/PolyGram; MCA/Universal; Celluloid; EMI Nigeria; Jofabro Nigeria; JVC; Wrasse; Shanachie; Knitting Factory
- Website: felakuti.com

Fela Aníkúlápó Kútì (/ˈfɛlə ˈkuːti/ FEH-lə KOO-tee; Yoruba: [fɛ̄lá āníkúlák͡pó kútì]; born Olufela Olusegun Oludotun Ransome-Kuti; 15 October 1938 – 2 August 1997) was a Nigerian musician and political activist. He is regarded as the principal innovator of Afrobeat, a Nigerian music genre that combines West African music with American funk and jazz. At the height of his popularity, he was referred to as one of Africa's most "challenging and charismatic music performers". AllMusic described him as "a musical and sociopolitical voice" of international significance.

Kuti was the son of Nigerian women's rights activist Funmilayo Ransome-Kuti. After early experiences abroad, he and his band Africa '70 (featuring drummer and musical director Tony Allen) shot to stardom in Nigeria during the 1970s, during which Kuti was an outspoken critic and target of Nigeria's military juntas. In 1970, he founded the Kalakuta Republic commune, which declared itself independent from military rule. The commune was destroyed in a 1977 army raid that injured Kuti and killed his mother. He was jailed by the government of Muhammadu Buhari in 1984, but released after 20 months. Kuti continued to record and perform through the 1980s and 1990s. Since his death in 1997, reissues and compilations of his music have been overseen by his son, Femi Kuti.

In 2026, Kuti was posthumously inducted into the Rock and Roll Hall of Fame in the early/musical influence category after two previous nominations.

== Life and career ==
=== Early life ===
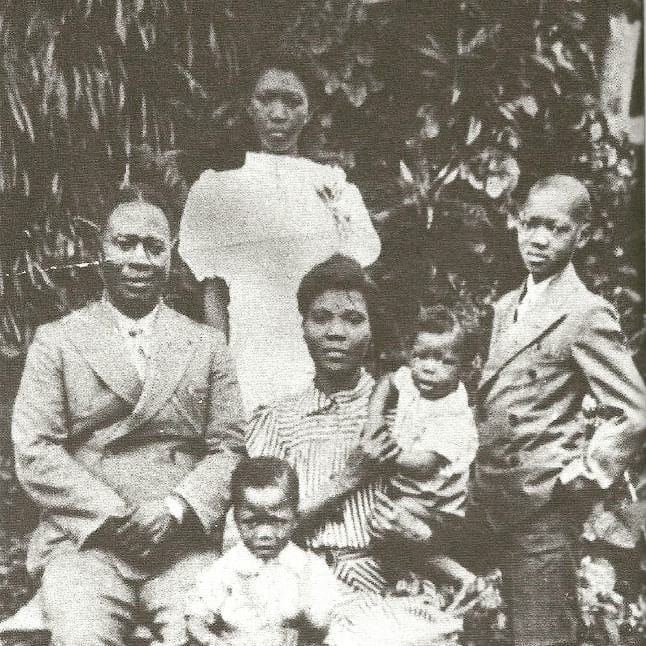
The Ransome-Kuti family c. 1940

Kuti was born into the Ransome-Kuti family, an upper-middle-class family, on 15 October 1938, in Abeokuta, Nigeria. His mother, Funmilayo Ransome-Kuti, was an anti-colonial feminist, and his father, Israel Oludotun Ransome-Kuti was an Anglican minister, school principal, and the first president of the Nigeria Union of Teachers. Kuti's parents both played active roles in the anti-colonial movement in Nigeria, most notably the Abeokuta Women's Riots which were led by his mother in 1946. His brothers Beko Ransome-Kuti and Olikoye Ransome-Kuti, both medical doctors, were well known nationally. Kuti is a cousin to the writer and fellow activist Wole Soyinka, a Nobel Prize for Literature winner. They are both descendants of Josiah Ransome-Kuti, an Anglican clergyman and musical pioneer, who is Kuti's paternal grandfather and Soyinka's maternal great-grandfather.

Kuti attended Abeokuta Grammar School. In 1958, he was invited to London by his younger brother Beko (a medical student at the time), to study music at the Trinity College of Music, with the trumpet being his preferred instrument. While there, he formed the band Koola Lobitos and played a fusion of jazz and highlife. The ensemble would include as members Bayo Martins on drums and Wole Bucknor on piano. In 1960, Kuti married his first wife, Remilekun (Remi) Taylor with whom he had three children (Yeni, Femi, and Sola). In 1963, Kuti moved back to the newly independent Federation of Nigeria, re-formed Koola Lobitos, and trained as a radio producer for the Nigerian Broadcasting Corporation. He played for some time with Victor Olaiya and his All-Stars.

He called his style Afrobeat, a combination of Apala, funk, jazz, highlife, salsa, calypso and traditional Yoruba music. In 1969, Kuti took the band to the United States and spent ten months in Los Angeles. While there, he discovered the Black Power movement through Sandra Smith (now known as Sandra Izsadore or Sandra Akanke Isidore), a partisan of the Black Panther Party. This experience heavily influenced his music and political views. He renamed the band Nigeria 70. Soon after, the Immigration and Naturalization Service was tipped off by a promoter that Kuti and his band were in the US without work permits. The band performed a quick recording session in Los Angeles that would later be released as The '69 Los Angeles Sessions.

=== 1970s ===
After Kuti and his band returned to Nigeria, the group was renamed (the) Africa '70 as lyrical themes changed from love to social issues. He formed the Kalakuta Republic—a commune, recording studio, and home for many people connected to the band—which he later declared independent from the Nigerian state.

Kuti set up a nightclub in the Empire Hotel. First named the Afro-Spot and later the Afrika Shrine, this was where he performed regularly and officiated at personalised Yoruba traditional ceremonies in honor of his native ancestral faith. He also changed his name to Anikulapo (meaning "He who carries death in his pouch", with the interpretation: "I will be the master of my own destiny and will decide when it is time for death to take me"). He stopped using the hyphenated surname "Ransome" because he considered it to be a slave name.

Kuti's music was popular among the Nigerian public and Africans in general. He decided to sing in Pidgin English so that individuals all over Africa could enjoy his music, where the local languages they speak are diverse and numerous. As popular as Kuti's music had become in Nigeria and elsewhere, it was unpopular with the government, and raids on the Kalakuta Republic were frequent. During 1972, Ginger Baker recorded Stratavarious, with Kuti appearing alongside vocalist and guitarist Bobby Tench. Around this time, Kuti became even more involved with the Yoruba traditional religion.

In 1977, Kuti and Africa 70 released the album Zombie, which heavily criticized Nigerian soldiers, and used the zombie metaphor to describe the Nigerian military's methods. The album was a massive success and infuriated the government, who raided the Kalakuta Republic with 1,000 soldiers. During the raid, Kuti was severely beaten, and his elderly mother (who had contributed to the movement for Nigeria's Independence) was fatally injured after being thrown from a window. The commune was burnt down, and Kuti's studio, instruments, and master tapes were destroyed. Kuti claimed that he would have been killed had it not been for a commanding officer's intervention as he was being beaten. Kuti's response to the attack was to deliver his mother's coffin to the Dodan Barracks in Lagos, General Olusegun Obasanjo's official residence, and to write two songs, "Coffin for Head of State" and "Unknown Soldier," referencing the official inquiry that claimed an unknown soldier had destroyed the commune.

Kuti and his band took up residence in Crossroads Hotel after the Shrine had been destroyed along with the commune. In 1978, he married 27 women, many of whom were dancers, composers, and singers with whom he worked. The marriages served not only to mark the anniversary of the attack on the Kalakuta Republic but also to protect Kuti and his wives from the authorities' false claims that Kuti was kidnapping women. Later, he adopted a rotation system of maintaining 12 simultaneous wives. There were also two concerts in the year: the first was in Accra, in which rioting broke out during the song "Zombie", which caused Kuti to be banned from entering Ghana; the second was after the Berlin Jazz Festival, when most of Kuti's musicians deserted him due to rumours that he planned to use all of the proceeds to fund his presidential campaign.

Other reports suggested that, being disappointed by their fees, band leader Tony Allen and almost all of the musicians resigned. Baryton player Lekan Animashaun became band leader following this, and Fela created a new group named Egypt 80. In 1979, Kuti formed his political party, which he called Movement of the People (MOP), to "clean up society like a mop", but it quickly became inactive due to his confrontations with the government of the day. MOP preached Nkrumahism and Africanism.

=== 1980s and beyond ===
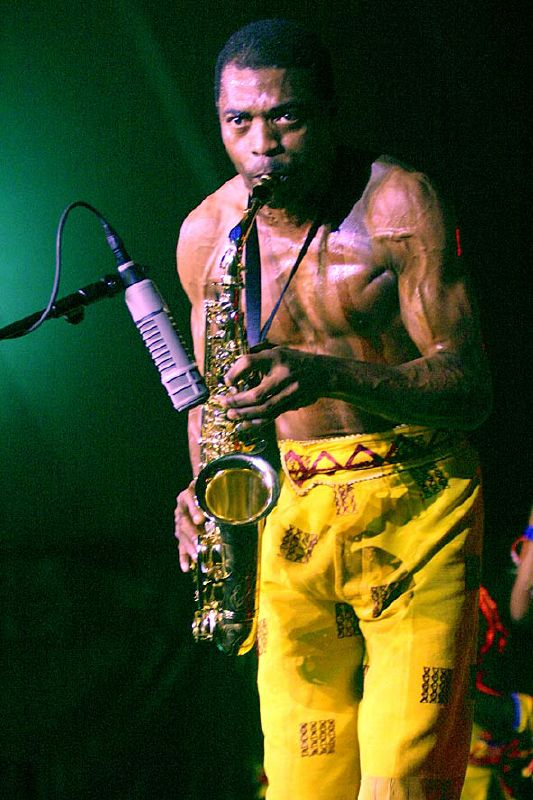

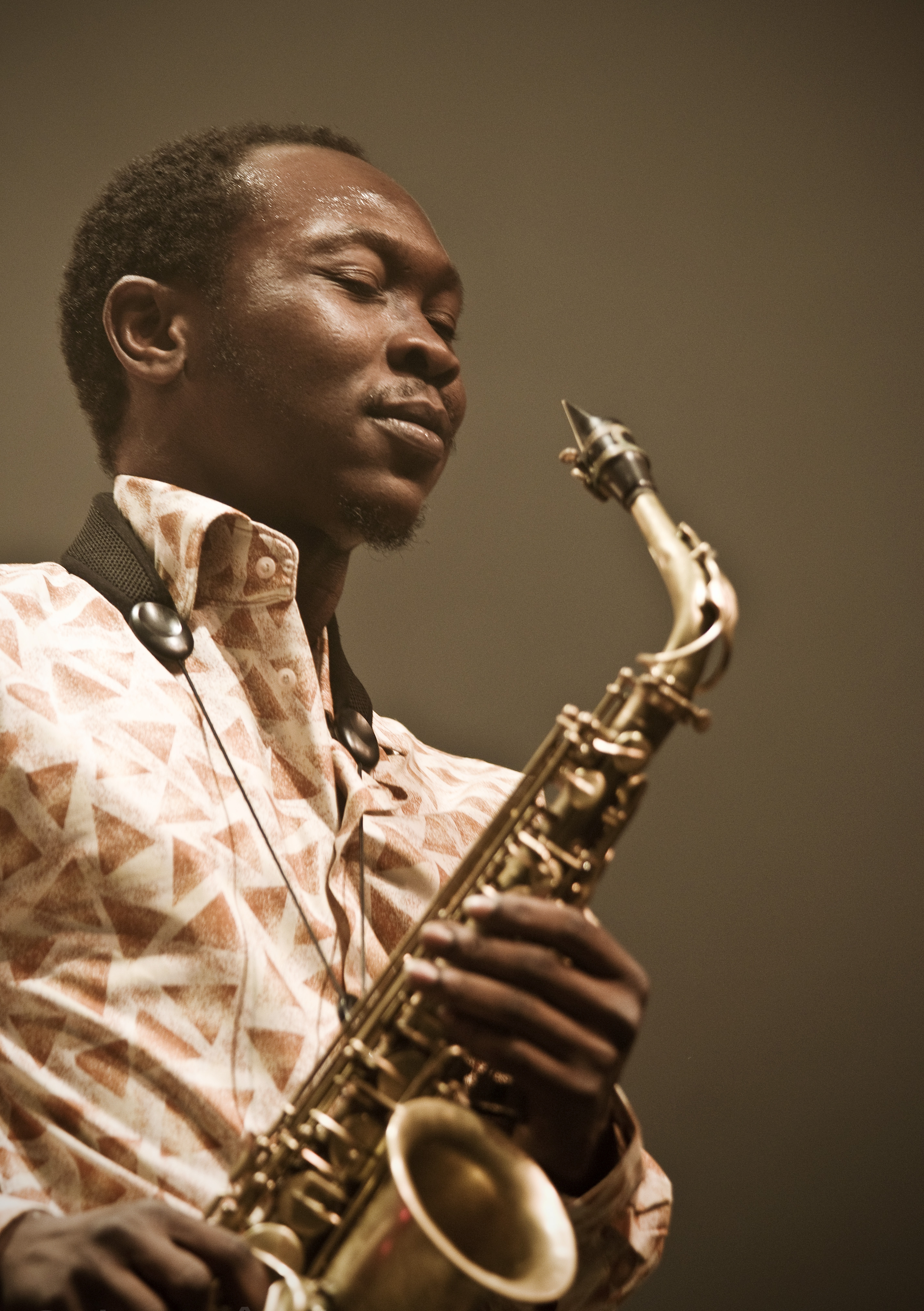
Two of Kuti's sons are musicians: Femi and Seun.

In 1980, Kuti signed an exclusive management deal with French producer Martin Meissonnier, who secured a record deal with Arista Records London through A&R Tarquin Gotch. The first album came out in February 1981 under the title of Black President, with the track "ITT" and on the B-Side "Colonial Mentality" and an edited version of "Sorrow, Tears and Blood" (these two tracks recorded with Africa 70 and Tony Allen were unreleased in Europe). Following the release, Kuti performed his first European tour (four concerts in a week) with a suite of 70 people. The tour, starting in Paris on 15 March 1981, had a huge crowd estimated at 10,000 people attending, then Brussels, Vienna and Strasbourg. Black President was followed by another album that was recorded in Paris in July 1981: Original Sufferhead, with "Power Show" on the B-side. Kuti also recorded the track "Perambulator" in Paris. Arista gave his masters to Fela at the end of 1981. French Filmmaker Jean Jacques Flori came to Lagos in early 1982 to direct the now classic film "Music is a Weapon". The film was broadcast first on Antenne 2 (French TV in 1982). The film producer Stephane Tchalgaldjieff didn't like the resulting film, and decided to re-edit it for an international release. "V.I.P. (Vagabonds in Power)" and "Authority Stealing" were released in 1980, with the former being a live performance done in Berlin, West Germany.

In 1983, Kuti nominated himself for president in Nigeria's first elections in decades, but his candidacy was refused. At this time, Kuti recreated his band, Egypt 80, which reflected the view that Egyptian civilization, knowledge, philosophy, mathematics, and religious systems are African and must be claimed as such. Kuti stated in an interview: "Stressing the point that I have to make Africans aware of the fact that Egyptian civilization belongs to the African. So that was the reason why I changed the name of my band to Egypt 80." Kuti continued to record albums and tour the country. He further infuriated the political establishment by implicating ITT Corporation's vice-president, Moshood Abiola, and Obasanjo in the popular 25-minute political screed entitled "I.T.T. (International Thief-Thief)".

In 1984, Muhammadu Buhari's government, of which Kuti was a vocal opponent, jailed him on a charge of currency smuggling. Amnesty International and others denounced the charges as politically motivated. Amnesty designated him a prisoner of conscience, and other human rights groups also took up his case. After 20 months, General Ibrahim Babangida released him from prison. On his release, Kuti divorced his 12 remaining wives, citing "marriage brings jealousy and selfishness" since his wives would regularly compete for superiority.

Kuti continued to release albums with Egypt 80 and toured in the United States and Europe while continuing to be politically active. In 1986, he performed in Giants Stadium in New Jersey as part of Amnesty International's A Conspiracy of Hope concert along with Bono, Carlos Santana, and the Neville Brothers. In 1989, Kuti and Egypt 80 released the anti-apartheid album Beasts of No Nation that depicted U.S. President Ronald Reagan, UK Prime Minister Margaret Thatcher, and South African State President Pieter Willem Botha on its cover. The title of the composition evolved out of a statement by Botha: "This uprising [against the apartheid system] will bring out the beast in us."

Kuti's album output slowed in the 1990s, and eventually, he ceased releasing albums altogether. On 21 January 1993, he and four members of Egypt 80 were arrested and were later charged on 25 January for the murder of an electrician. Rumours also circulated that he was suffering from an illness for which he was refusing treatment. However, there had been no confirmed statement from Kuti about this speculation.

== Death ==
On 3 August 1997, Kuti's brother Olikoye Ransome-Kuti announced Kuti had died on the previous day from heart failure due to complications with AIDS. Kuti had been an AIDS denialist, and his widow maintained he did not die of the disease.

== Personal life ==
Kuti married 27 women simultaneously in 1978. His senior wife was Remilekun Taylor.

His youngest son Seun took the role of leader of Kuti's former band Egypt 80. As of 2026, the band was still active, releasing music under the name Seun Kuti & Egypt 80. His other children include musicians Femi and Yeni Kuti.

== Music ==
=== Music ===
Kuti's musical style is called Afrobeat. It is a style he largely created, and is a complex fusion of jazz, funk, highlife, and traditional Nigerian and African chants and rhythms. It contains elements of Afro-Cuban music, psychedelic soul and has similarities to James Brown's music. Afrobeat also borrows heavily from the native "tinker pan".

Tony Allen, Kuti's drummer of over ten years, was instrumental in the creation of Afrobeat. Tony Allen's drumming notably makes sparing use of 2 & 4 backbeat style playing, instead opting for outlining the time in shuffling hard-bop fashion. Allen would usually play tightly swung, aggressive triplet patterns on his hi-hat. On his snare drum, he would often play patterns that implied the clave feeling underlying the whole piece, but not explicitly stating it. This contrasts with modern pop music from Nigeria, where snare patterns often simply play the five-stroke clave. Though he often maintained a strong downbeat, usually with a double kick-drum hit on the 1, he would sometimes play the snare on the 1 and displacing the first kick drum hit to an off-beat or to the 2, in a manner not dissimilar to conventional reggae drumming. After his departure from Afrika 70, Allen became a star in his own right, had a critically acclaimed solo career, collaborated with artists from diverse genres all over the globe and has been widely recognised for the innovation and technicality of his style. Tony Allen died on 30 April 2020.

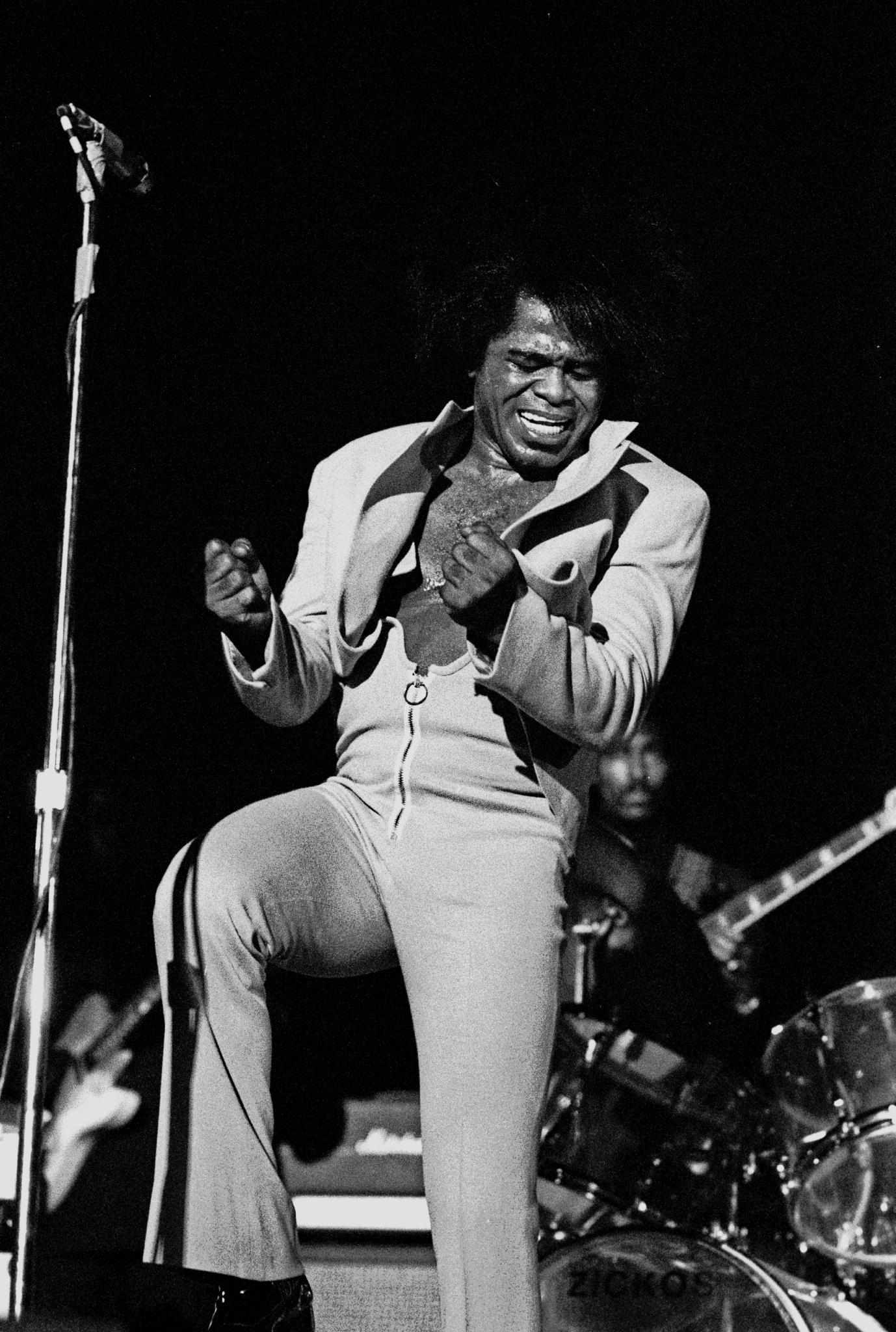
James Brown was an important American influence on Kuti's musical style.

There are clear, audible musical similarities between Kuti's compositions and the work of electric-era Miles Davis, Sly Stone and Afrofunk pioneer Orlando Julius, as well as the approach to modality pioneered by Davis and Coltrane, as expressed in the funk idiom.

Kuti's band was notable for featuring two baritone saxophones when most groups only used one. This is a common technique in African and African-influenced musical styles and can be seen in funk and hip hop. There were always two or more guitarists. The electric West African style guitar in Afrobeat bands is a key part of the sound, and is used to give basic structure, playing a repeating chordal/melodic statement, riff, or groove. In styles like soukous and juju, there might be guitars playing similar roles but allowed to improvise melodically through at least some sections of a given piece. One of Kuti's main innovations especially during his 70's heyday was to have all three of the guitars (bass, rhythm and tenor) maintain one pattern each with no deviation for the whole runtime of a piece, though some songs might have contrasting intros or modulations into a different key.

Some elements often present in Kuti's music are the call-and-response within the chorus and figurative but simple lyrics. His songs were also very long, at least 10–15 minutes in length, and many reached 20 or 30 minutes, while some unreleased tracks would last up to 45 minutes when performed live. Their length was one of many reasons that his music never reached a substantial degree of popularity outside Africa. His LP records frequently had one 30-minute track per side. Typically, there is an "instrumental introduction" jam section of the song—roughly 10 to 15 minutes long—before Kuti starts singing the "main" part of the song, featuring his lyrics and singing, for another 10 to 15 minutes. On some recordings, his songs are divided into two parts: Part 1 being the instrumental, and Part 2 adding in vocals.

Kuti's songs are mostly sung in Nigerian Pidgin English, although he also performed a few songs in the Yoruba language. His main instruments were the saxophone and the keyboards, but he also played the trumpet, electric guitar, and the occasional drum solo. Kuti refused to perform songs again after he had already recorded them.

The subject of Kuti's songs tended to be very complex. They regularly challenged common received notions in the manner of political commentary through song. Many of his songs also expressed a form of parody and satire. The main theme he conveyed through his music was the search for justice through exploration of political and social topics that affected the common people.

=== Showmanship ===
Kuti was known for his showmanship, and his concerts were often outlandish and wild. He referred to his stage act as the "Underground Spiritual Game". Many expected him to perform shows like those in the Western world, but during the 1980s, he was not interested in putting on a "show". His European performance was a representation of what was relevant at the time and his other inspirations. He attempted to make a movie but lost all the materials to the fire that was set to his house by the military government in power. He thought that art, and thus his own music, should have political meaning.

Kuti's concerts also regularly involved female singers and dancers, later dubbed as "Queens." The Queens were women who helped influence the popularization of his music. They were dressed colorfully and wore makeup all over their bodies that expressed their visual creativity. The singers of the group played a backup role for Kuti, usually echoing his words or humming along, while the dancers would put on a performance of an erotic manner. This began to spark controversy due to the nature of their involvement with Kuti's political tone, along with the reality that a lot of the women were young.

Kuti was part of an Afrocentric consciousness movement that was founded on and delivered through his music. In an interview included in Hank Bordowitz's Noise of the World, Kuti stated:

Music is supposed to have an effect. If you're playing music and people don't feel something, you're not doing shit. That's what African music is about. When you hear something, you must move. I want to move people to dance, but also to think. Music wants to dictate a better life, against a bad life. When you're listening to something that depicts having a better life, and you're not having a better life, it must have an effect on you.

== Political views and activism ==
=== Activism ===
Kuti was highly engaged in political activism in Africa from the 1970s until his death. He frequently criticized corruption among Nigerian government officials and the mistreatment of Nigerian citizens. He argued that colonialism was a major cause of the socio-economic and political challenges faced by African people. Corruption was a significant issue facing countries in Africa in the 1970s, and Nigeria was frequently cited as being heavily affected by it. Nigeria experienced rigged elections and military coups that contributed to instability and worsened economic conditions including poverty and inequality. Kuti's protest songs covered themes inspired by the realities of corruption and socio-economic inequality in Africa. His political statements reached audiences across Africa.

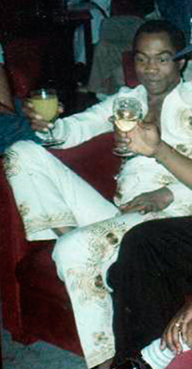
Kuti in 1970

Kuti's open criticism of Nigeria's government led to significant personal consequences. He was arrested on over 200 different occasions, and spent time in jail, including his longest stint of 20 months after his arrest in 1984. In addition to imprisoning Kuti, Nigerian authorities sent soldiers to assault him, his family and associates, and destroy his home, instruments, and recordings.

In the 1970s, Kuti began to run outspoken political columns in the advertising space of daily and weekly newspapers such as The Daily Times and The Punch, bypassing editorial censorship in Nigeria's predominantly state-controlled media. Published throughout the 1970s and early 1980s under the title "Chief Priest Say", these columns were extensions of Kuti's famous Yabis Sessions—consciousness-raising word-sound rituals, with him serving as chief priest, conducted at his Lagos nightclub. Organized around a militantly Afrocentric rendering of history and the essence of black beauty, "Chief Priest Say" focused on the role of cultural hegemony in the continuing subjugation of Africans. Kuti addressed many topics, from fierce denunciations of the Nigerian Government's criminal behavior, Islam and Christianity's exploitative nature, and evil multinational corporations; to deconstructions of Western medicine, Black Muslims, sex, pollution, and poverty. "Chief Priest Say" was eventually canceled by The Daily Times and The Punch. Many have speculated that the paper's editors were pressured to stop publication, including threats of violence.

=== Political views ===
"Imagine Che Guevara and Bob Marley rolled into one person and you get a sense of Nigerian musician and activist Fela Kuti."

— Herald Sun, February 2011

Kuti's rise in popularity throughout the 1970s signalled a change in the relation between music as an art form and Nigerian socio-political discourse. In 1984, he critiqued and insulted the authoritarian then-president of the Federal Republic of Nigeria, Muhammadu Buhari. "Beasts of No Nation", one of his most popular songs, refers to Buhari as an "animal in a madman's body"; in Nigerian Pidgin: "No be outside Buhari dey ee / na craze man be dat / animal in craze man skini."

Kuti promoted Pan-Africanism and socialism and called for a united, democratic African republic. He thought the most important way for them to fight European cultural imperialism was to support traditional religions and lifestyles in their continent. The American Black Power movement also influenced Kuti's political views; African leaders he supported during his lifetime include Kwame Nkrumah and Thomas Sankara. Kuti was an outspoken supporter of human rights, and many of his songs criticized dictatorships and particularly Nigeria's military governments in the 1970s and 1980s. He also criticized fellow Africans (especially the upper class) for betraying traditional African culture.

In 1978 Kuti became a polygamist when he simultaneously married 27 women, who were his backup singers. The highly publicized wedding served many purposes: it marked the one-year anniversary of Kuti and his wives surviving the Nigerian government's attack on the Kalakuta Republic in 1977, and also formalized Kuti's relationships with the women living with him; this legal status prevented the Nigerian government from raiding Kuti's compound on the grounds that Kuti had kidnapped the women. Kuti also described polygamy as logical and convenient: "A man goes for many women in the first place. Like in Europe, when a man is married when the wife is sleeping, he goes out and sleeps around. He should bring the women in the house, man, to live with him, and stop running around the streets!" However, he professed that he would not have marital relations with them and that he was marrying them to provide financial support after his recording studio had been destroyed.

Some characterize his views towards women as misogyny and typically cite songs like "Mattress" as further evidence. In a more complex example, he mocks African women's aspiration to European standards of ladyhood while extolling the values of the market woman in "Lady". However, Kuti also critiqued what he considered aberrant displays of African masculinity. In his songs "J.J.D. (Johnny Just Drop)" and "Gentleman", Kuti mocks African men's culturally and politically inappropriate adoption of European standards and declares himself "African man: Original".

Kuti was also an outspoken critic of the United States. At a meeting during his 1981 Amsterdam tour, he "complained about the psychological warfare that American organizations like ITT and the CIA waged against developing nations in terms of language". Because terms such as Third World, undeveloped, or non-aligned countries imply inferiority, Kuti felt they should not be used.

== Legacy ==
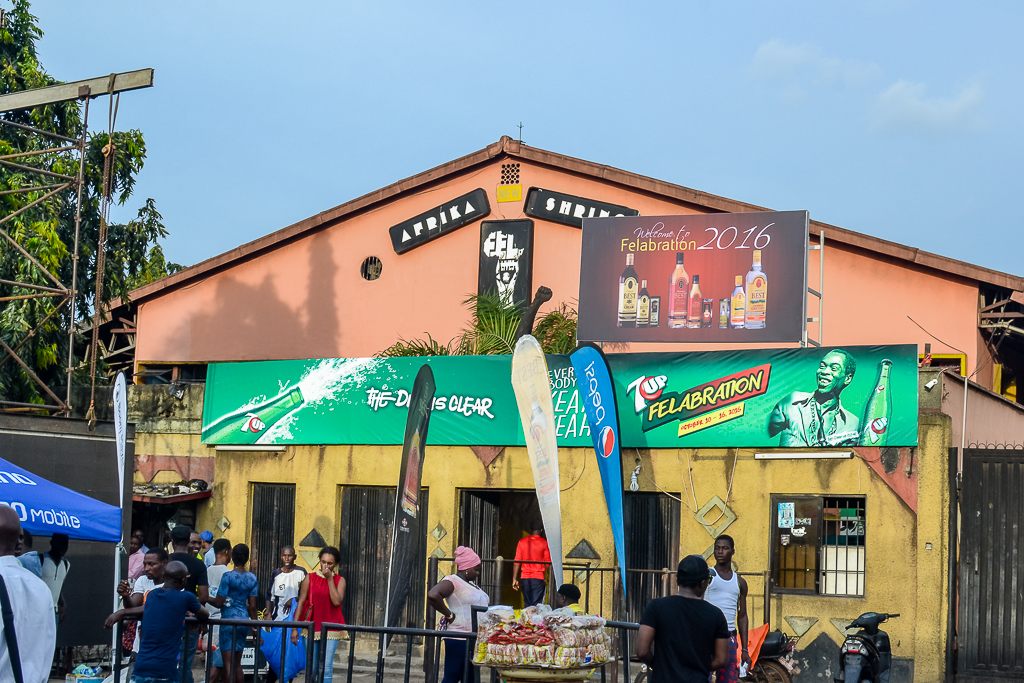
The New Afrika Shrine, Lagos

Kuti is remembered as an influential icon who voiced his opinions on matters that affected the nation through his music. Since 1998, the Felabration festival, an idea pioneered by his daughter Yeni Kuti, is held each year at the New Afrika Shrine to celebrate the life of this music legend and his birthday. Since Kuti's death in 1997, there has been a revival of his influence in music and popular culture, culminating in another re-release of his catalog controlled by UMG, Broadway, and off-Broadway shows, and new bands, such as Antibalas, who carry the Afrobeat banner to a new generation of listeners.

In 1999, Universal Music France, under Francis Kertekian, remastered the 45 albums that it owned and released them on 26 compact discs. These titles were licensed globally, except in Nigeria and Japan, where other companies owned Kuti's music. In 2005, the American operations of UMG licensed all of its world-music titles to the UK-based label Wrasse Records, which repackaged the same 26 discs for distribution in the United States (where they replaced the titles issues by MCA) and the UK. In 2009, Universal created a new deal for the US and Europe, with Knitting Factory Records and PIAS respectively, which included the release of the Broadway cast recording of the musical Fela! In 2013, FKO Ltd., the entity that owned the rights to all of Kuti's compositions, was acquired by BMG Rights Management.

In 2003, the Black President exhibition debuted at the New Museum for Contemporary Art, New York, and featured concerts, symposia, films, and 39 international artists' works.

American singer Bilal recorded a remake of Kuti's 1977 song "Sorrow Tears and Blood" for his second album, Love for Sale, featuring a guest rap by Common. Bilal cited Kuti's mix of jazz and folk tastes as an influence on his music. Fela Kuti influenced acts such as Talking Heads and Atoms for Peace.

The 2007 film The Visitor, directed by Thomas McCarthy, depicted a disconnected professor (Richard Jenkins) who wanted to play the djembe; he learns from a young Syrian (Haaz Sleiman) who tells the professor he will never truly understand African music unless he listens to Fela. The film features clips of Kuti's "Open and Close" and "Je'nwi Temi (Don't Gag Me)".

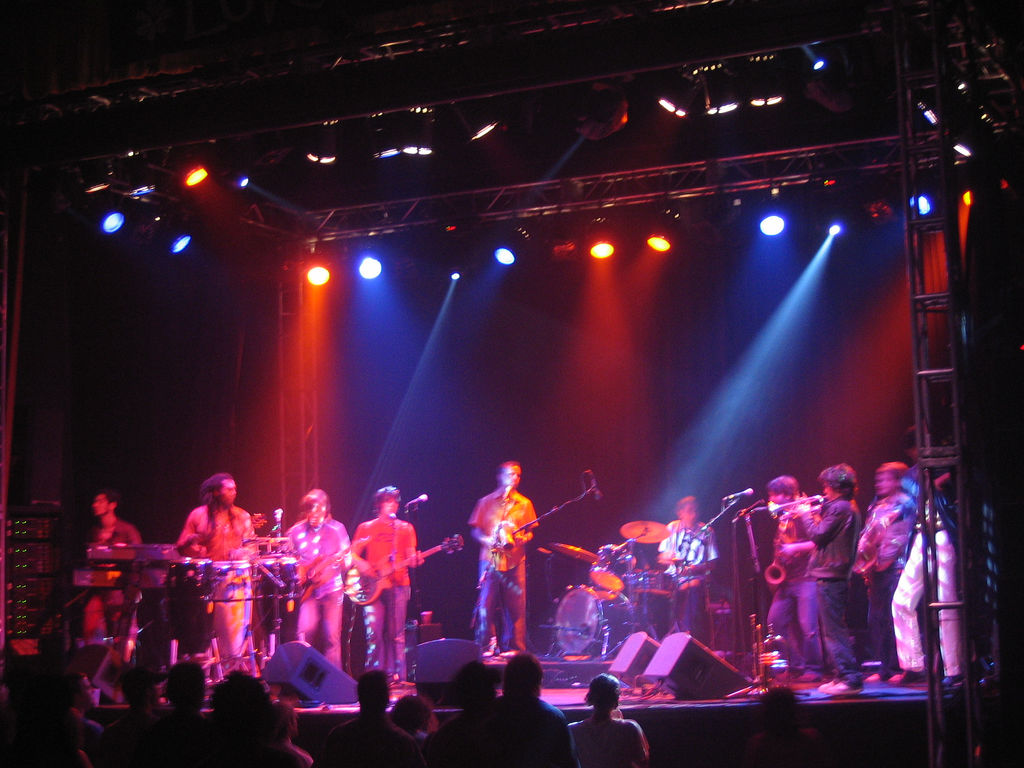
The Afrobeat band Antibalas in 2005

In 2008, an off-Broadway production about Kuti's life, entitled Fela! and inspired by the 1982 biography Fela, Fela! This Bitch of a Life by Carlos Moore, began with a collaborative workshop between the Afrobeat band Antibalas and Tony award-winner Bill T. Jones. The production was a massive success, and sold-out performances during its run and gained critical acclaim. On 22 November 2009, Fela! began a run on Broadway at the Eugene O'Neill Theatre. Jim Lewis helped co-write the script (along with Jones) and obtained producer backing from Jay-Z and Will Smith, among others. On 4 May 2010, Fela! was nominated for 11 Tony Awards, including Best Musical, Best Book of a Musical, Best Direction of a Musical for Bill T. Jones, Best Leading Actor in a Musical for Sahr Ngaujah, and Best Featured Actress in a Musical for Lillias White. In 2011, the London production of Fela! (staged at the Royal National Theatre) was filmed. On 11 June 2012, it was announced that Fela! would return to Broadway for 32 performances.

On 18 August 2009, DJ J.Period released a free mixtape to the general public, entitled The Messengers. It is a collaboration with Somali-born hip-hop artist K'naan paying tribute to Kuti, Bob Marley and Bob Dylan.

Two months later, Knitting Factory Records began re-releasing the 45 titles controlled by UMG, starting with yet another re-release in the US of the compilation The Best of the Black President, which was completed and released in 2013.

Fela Son of Kuti: The Fall of Kalakuta is a stage play written by Onyekaba Cornel Best in 2010. It has had triumphant acclaim as part of that year's Felabration and returned in 2014 at the National Theatre and Freedom Park in Lagos. The play deals with events in a hideout, a day after the fall of Kalakuta.

The full-length documentary film Finding Fela, directed by Alex Gibney, premiered at the 2014 Sundance Film Festival.

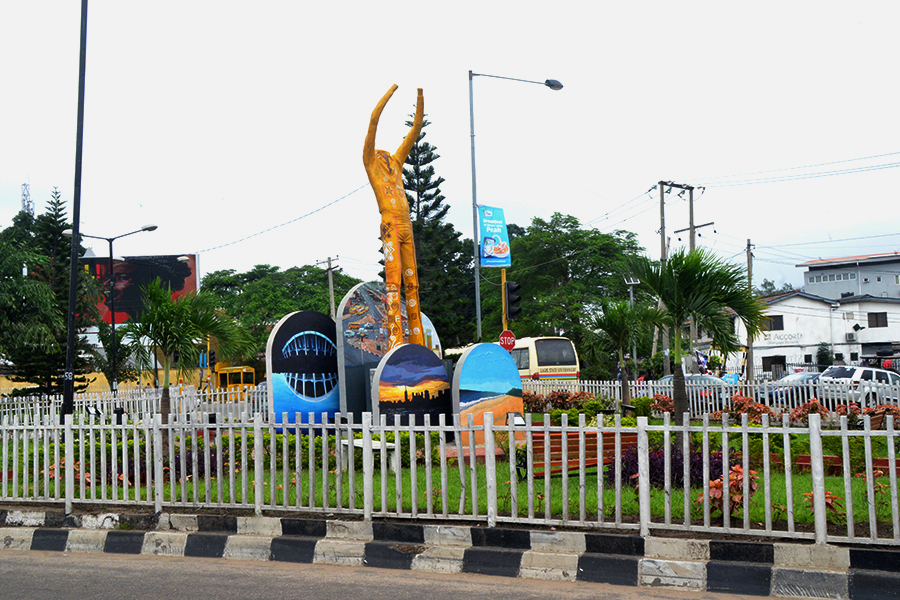
Fela Kuti statue at Ikeja, Lagos

A biographical film by Focus Features, directed by Steve McQueen and written by Biyi Bandele, was rumoured to be in production in 2010, with Chiwetel Ejiofor in the lead role. However, by 2014, the proposal was no longer produced under Focus Features, and while he maintained his role as the main writer, McQueen was replaced by Andrew Dosunmu as the director. McQueen told The Hollywood Reporter that the film was "dead".

The 2019 documentary film My Friend Fela (Meu amigo Fela) by Joel Zito Araújo, explores the complexity of Kuti's life "through the eyes and conversations" of his biographer Carlos Moore.

The collaborative jazz/afrobeat album Rejoice by Tony Allen and Hugh Masekela, released in 2020, includes the track "Never (Lagos Never Gonna Be the Same)", a tribute to Kuti, through whom Allen and Masekela first met in the 1970s.

Kuti's songs "Zombie" & "Sorrow Tears and Blood" have appeared in the video game Grand Theft Auto: IV, and he was posthumously nominated to the Rock & Roll Hall of Fame in 2021.

In 2021, Hulu released a six-episode documentary miniseries, McCartney 3,2,1, in which Paul McCartney is quoted as saying of a visit to see Fela Kuti at the African Shrine, Kuti's club outside of Lagos, in the early 1970s: "The music was so incredible that I wept. Hearing that was one of the greatest music moments of my life."

On 1 November 2021, a blue plaque was unveiled by the Nubian Jak Community Trust at 12 Stanlake Road, Shepherd's Bush, where Kuti first lived when he came to London in 1958 and was studying music at Trinity College.

In 2022, Kuti was inducted into the Black Music & Entertainment Walk of Fame. In 2023, Rolling Stone ranked Kuti at number 188 on its list of the 200 Greatest Singers of All Time.

The podcast series Fela Kuti: Fear No Man was released weekly in late 2025. The Peabody-winning show, hosted by Jad Abumrad, dug deep into Kuti's influence as a musician and activist.

In January 2026, the Recording Academy posthumously honoured Kuti with the Grammy Lifetime Achievement Award at the Special Merit ceremony of the 68th Annual Grammy Awards in Los Angeles. The award recognised his contributions to global music and his pioneering role in the development of the Afrobeat genre. Kuti became the first African artist to receive the Lifetime Achievement Award since it was established in 1963. His children, including Femi, Yeni, and Kunle Kuti, accepted the award on his behalf. The honour placed him alongside other iconic musicians such as Whitney Houston, Chaka Khan, Cher, Paul Simon, and Carlos Santana.

== Discography ==
With Africa 70

- Fela Fela Fela (1970)
- Live! (with Ginger Baker) (1971)
- Why Black Man Dey Suffer (with Ginger Baker) (1971)
- Fela's London Scene (1971)
- Open & Close (1971)
- Na Poi (1971)
- Shakara (1972)
- Roforofo Fight (1972)
- Afrodisiac (1973)
- Gentleman (1973)
- Alagbon Close (1974)
- Noise for Vendor Mouth (1975)
- Confusion (1975)
- Everything Scatter (1975)
- Expensive Shit (1975)
- He Miss Road (1975)
- Unnecessary Begging (1976)
- Kalakuta Show (1976)
- Upside Down (1976)
- Ikoyi Blindness (1976)
- Before I Jump Like Monkey Give Me Banana (1976)
- Excuse-O (1976)
- Yellow Fever (1976)
- Zombie (1977)
- Stalemate (1977)
- No Agreement (1977)
- Sorrow Tears and Blood (1977)
- J.J.D. (Johnny Just Drop!!) (1977)
- Shuffering and Shmiling (1978)
- Unknown Soldier (1979)
- V.I.P. (Vagabonds in Power) (1979)
- I.T.T. (International Thief Thief) (1980)
- Music of Many Colours (1980) (with Roy Ayers)
- Authority Stealing (1980)
- Coffin for Head of State (1981)
- I Go Shout Plenty!!! (1986, recorded in 1976)

With Egypt 80

- Original Sufferhead (1982)
- Perambulator (1983)
- Live in Amsterdam (1983)
- Army Arrangement (1985)
- Teacher Don't Teach Me Nonsense (1986)
- Beasts of No Nation (1989)
- Confusion Break Bones (1990)
- O.D.O.O. (Overtake Don Overtake Overtake) (1990)
- Underground System (1992)
- Live in Detroit 1986 (2010)

Compilations

- The Best Best of Fela Kuti (1999)
- The Underground Spiritual Game (2004)
- Lagos Baby 1963 to 1969 (2008)
- The Best of the Black President 2 (2013)

== Filmography ==
- Arena - Fela Kuti: Father of Afrobeat,2020 Plimsoll MamaPut Film for BBC
- My Friend Fela, 2019, Joel Zito Araújo (Casa de Criação Cinema)
- Faces of Africa - Fela Kuti: The Father of Afrobeat, 2017, CGTN Africa.
- Finding Fela, 2014, Alex Gibney and Jack Gulick (Jigsaw Productions)
- Femi Kuti — Live at the Shrine, 2005, recorded live in Lagos, Nigeria (Palm Pictures)
- Fela Live! Fela Anikulapo-Kuti and the Egypt '80 Band, 1984, recorded live at Glastonbury, England (Yazoo)
- Fela Kuti: Teacher Don't Teach Me Nonsense & Berliner Jazztage '78 (Double Feature), 1984 (Lorber Films)
- Fela in Concert, 1981 (VIEW)
- Music Is the Weapon, 1982, Stéphane Tchalgadjieff and Jean-Jacques Flori (Universal Music)
