= Igo Chico =

Musician

Igo Chico Okwechime played tenor saxophone for Fela Kuti's afrobeat entourage Africa '70 during its formative period in the early-1970s. He eventually left the band after a dispute with Kuti, who took up tenor saxophone himself to replace him.

Chico's swelling, lyrical, palm-wine-infused style greatly contrasted with Fela Kuti's more punctuated, machine-gun-like style on the instrument. His solos throughout the band's early-1970s recordings are distinguishable by those properties and by his growly timbre, though the performance credits are not well documented in the album notes to the digital CD re-releases.

A characteristic Chico tenor solo is his performance in the tune "Monday Morning In Lagos" from the album He Miss Road. Another definitive solo appears in "It's No Possible (Ko Se Se)" from the same album. Other standout Chico performances are on "Fight to Finish" and "Who're You", both on the Fela's London Scene album.
