= The Underground Spiritual Game =

Compilation album by Fela Kuti
- Released: September 7, 2004
- Label: Quannum Projects / IODA
- Producer: Chief Xcel

Professional ratings
Review scores
Source	Rating
AllMusic	3.5/5 stars
Tom Hull	A−

The Underground Spiritual Game is a compilation of twelve tracks by Fela Kuti, selected and mixed by Blackalicious producer Chief Xcel.

== Track listing ==
1. "Intro" – 0:26
2. "Ololufe Mi" – 1:08
3. "Trouble Sleep Yanga Wake Am" – 2:35
4. "Look and Laugh" – 4:18
5. "Mr Grammarticologylisationalism Is the Boss" – 8:02
6. "Monkey Banana" – 2:19
7. "Ariya" – 5:27
8. "Unnecessary Begging" – 8:35
9. "Swegbe & Pako" – 3:37
10. "Mr. Follow Follow" – 5:52
11. "Africa Center of the World" – 17:22
