= Teacher Don't Teach Me Nonsense =

Studio album by Fela Kuti
- Released: 1986
- Studio: Davout Studio
- Genre: Afrobeat
- Length: 56:36
- Language: Pidgin English
- Label: Knitting Factory Records
- Producer: Wally Badarou

Fela Kuti chronology
| Army Arrangement (1985) | Teacher Don't Teach Me Nonsense (1986) | Underground System (1990) |

Teacher Don't Teach Me Nonsense is a 1986 studio album by Fela Kuti and the Egypt 80.

== Background ==
The album consists of two tracks. "Look and Laugh" is a chronicle of an attack of Kalakuta Republic with the burning of his property and killing of his mother by Nigerian Soldiers. He sang "Till dem come/burn my house/burn my house/all my property/burn burn dem/beat beat me/kill my mama." In "Teacher Don't Teach Me Nonsense", Fela extols culture and tradition as the ultimate teacher and emphasises the need to enshrine African culture and tradition. He pointed out that the use of the western system of education was erroneous seeing as African children are taught about foreigners who "discovered" indigenous geographical landmarks which were not previously hidden. He also discussed issues relating to corruption, bad governance, mismanagement and undemocratic rule which plagued African countries.

== Track listing ==
All tracks are written by Fela Kuti.

| No. | Title | Length |
|---|---|---|
| 1. | "Teacher Don't Teach Me Nonsense" | 25:48 |
| 2. | "Look and Laugh" | 30:49 |
| Total length: | | 56:36 |

== Production and release ==
The album was produced by Wally Badarou.

The album has been rereleased on multiple occasions. The track, ''Just Like That'' was added as a bonus to a 2001 release by MCA; this track was initially released on Kuti's Beast of No Nation album in 1989.

== Reception ==
It was described as a message to the Nigerian government on education and poor governance.

In his review, John Dougan of AllMusic said "Badarou's production help gives Fela his most full-bodied sound; the horn section is much hotter and brassier than ever before. The problem with this record is that with following an instrumental track with a vocal version of the same song, there's a certain lack of drama that blunts the impact of songs as powerful as "Look and Laugh." That said, this is very good mid-'80s Fela." He rated the album 3 out of 5.

Professional ratings
Review scores
| Source | Rating |
|---|---|
| AllMusic | 3/5 stars |
| Robert Christgau | B+ |
| Tom Hull – on the Web | 3/5 stars |

== Personnel ==
| Instrument/Role | Personnel |
|---|---|
| Shekere | Lamptey Addo, George Kassim |
| Congas | Ajayi Adebiyi, Michael Obeatta |
| Sax (Tenor) | Oyinade Adeniran, Yinusa Akinibosun, Fela Kuti & Africa 70 |
| Sax (Baritone) | Lekan Animashaun, Rilwan Fagbemi |
| Sax (Alto) | Kola Oni |
| Dancer | Nosa Amayo, Serwa Asiedu, Pulcherie Hoga, Funmilayo Anikulapo Kuti, Najite Anikulapo Kuti, Jumoke Osunla |
| Producer | Wally Badarou |
| Mixing | Joelle Bauer |
| Engineer | Hervé Marignac |
| Mastering | Hervé Marignac |
| Assistant engineer | Sege Deveres |
| Trumpet | Akomeah Dodo, Stephen Nkem, Oye Shobowale, Bola Taiwo, Stephen Ukem |
| Piano | Keji Hamilton |
| Guitar | Clifford Itoje, Fela Kuti, Itam Mann, Soji Odukogbe |
| Vocals | Fehintola A. Kuti, Fela Kuti, Folake A. Kuti, Keuwe A. Kuti, Idolo Umokoro, Kemi Williams |
| Composer | Fela Kuti |
| Cover photo | Bernard Matussiere |
| Drums | Ijagun Benjy Ola, Atiba Tiamiyu |
| Bass | Femi Oladegunwa |
