= No Agreement =

Studio album by Fela Aníkúlápó Kuti and Africa 70
- Released: 1977
- Recorded: 1977 in Nigeria
- Genre: Afrobeat
- Length: 31:08
- Label: Decca Afrodisia; DWAPS 2039
- Producer: Fela Kuti

Fela Kuti chronology
Fear Not for Man (1977)	No Agreement (1977)	Sorrow Tears and Blood (1977)

No Agreement is an album by Nigerian Afrobeat composer, bandleader, and multi-instrumentalist Fela Kuti. It was recorded in 1977 and released on the Nigerian Decca label.

== Reception ==
Professional ratings
Review scores
Source	Rating
AllMusic	4.5/5 stars
Robert Christgau	B+
The Rolling Stone Album Guide	3.5/5 stars
Spin Alternative Record Guide	8/10

AllMusic stated: "No Agreement follows the Afro-beat template to a masterful level: amazingly catchy guitar lines that replicate a bass guitar in their construction, a second guitarist to add some JB's funk power, driving horn section proclamations, intricate saxophone, trumpet and organ improv solos, and then Fela Anikulapo Kuti's wit and message for the people... the solos are magically inspired and the rhythm section rolls on with the power of a steamroller". The Guardian called the title track "one of the greatest pieces of dance music ever recorded."

== Track listing ==
All compositions by Fela Kuti

1. "No Agreement" – 15:35
2. "Dog Eat Dog" – 15:33

== Personnel ==
- Fela Kuti – tenor saxophone, alto saxophone, electric piano, vocals
- Lester Bowie, Tunde Williams, Nwokoma Ukem – trumpet
- Lekan Animashaun – baritone saxophone
- Leke Benson, Okalve Ojeah, Clifford Itoje, Oghene Kologbo – guitar
- Nweke Atifoh – bass guitar
- Tony Allen – drums
- Ayoola Abayomi – percussion
- Babajide Olaleye – maracas
- Oladeinde Koffi, Addo Nettey, Shina Abiodun – congas
- Bimbo Adelanwa, Bola Olaniyi, Emaruagheru Osawe, Fehintola Kayode, Folake Oladeinde, Kewe Oghomienor, Ronke Edason, Shade Komolafe, Tejumade Adebiyi, Yemi Abegunde – chorus
