= Stalemate (Fela Kuti album) =

Studio album by Fela Aníkúlápó Kuti and the Afrika Seventi
- Released: 1977
- Recorded: 1977
- Studio: Decca Studios, Lagos
- Genre: Afrobeat
- Length: 28:39
- Label: Decca Afrodisia; DWAPS 2033
- Producer: Fela Kuti

Fela Kuti chronology
Opposite People (1977)	Stalemate (1977)	Fear Not for Man (1977)

Stalemate is an album by Nigerian Afrobeat composer, bandleader and multi-instrumentalist Fela Kuti recorded in 1977 and originally released on the Nigerian Decca label.

== Reception ==
Professional ratings
Review scores
Source	Rating
Allmusic	3/5 stars

The Allmusic review awarded the album 3 stars, stating: "the subject matter is more social than political in content. In keeping with tradition, the album Stalemate consists of two extended pieces – one per side. The title track has a mid-tempo trance groove that bends and yields to Kuti's call and response with Africa '70".

== Track listing ==
All compositions composed and arranged by Fela Kuti

1. "Stalemate" – 12:54.
2. "Don't Worry About My Mouth O (African Message)" – 15:45.

== Personnel ==
- Fela Kuti – tenor saxophone, alto saxophone, electric piano, vocals
- Tunde Williams, Nwokoma Ukem – trumpet
- Lester Bowie – trumpet
- Lekan Animashaun – baritone saxophone
- Leke Benson, Clifford Itoje, Oghene Kologbo – guitar
- Nweke Atifoh – bass guitar
- Tony Allen – drums
- Ayoola Abayomi – percussion
- Oladeinde Koffi, Addo Nettey, Shina Abiodun – congas
- Babajide Olaleye – maracas
- Bimbo Adelanwa, Bola Olaniyi, Emaruagheru Osawe, Fehintola Kayode, Folake Oladeinde, Kewe Oghomienor, Ronke Edason, Shade Komolafe, Tejumade Adebiyi, Yemi Abegunde – chorus singers
