= Na Poi =

Studio album by Fela Ransome-Kuti and the Africa '70
- Released: 1971
- Recorded: 1971 in Lagos, Nigeria
- Genre: Afrobeat
- Length: 32:55
- Label: EMI; HNLX 5070
- Producer: Fela Kuti

Fela Kuti chronology
| Why Black Man Dey Suffer (1971) | Na Poi (1971) | Open & Close (1971) |

Na Poi is an album by Nigerian Afrobeat composer, bandleader, and multi-instrumentalist Fela Kuti recorded in Lagos in 1971 and originally released on the Nigerian EMI label.

== Reception ==
Professional ratings
Review scores
| Source | Rating |
|---|---|
| Allmusic | 4/5 stars |

The Allmusic review awarded the album 4 stars commenting "In essence, the track is a sexual guide set to music. As such, it features both spoken narration as well as sung lyrics. 'Na Poi''s rhythms churn and grind through several notable movements—including a spirited percussion section and several tight horn arrangements. These hark back to the same type of perpetual funk that became the cornerstone of Parliament and Funkadelic. Initially, the repercussions of such blatant sexuality resulted in the track being banned by the Nigerian Broadcasting Company".

== Track listing ==
All compositions by Fela Kuti

1. "Na Poi (Part 1)" - 16:20
2. "Na Poi (Part 2)" - 9:00
3. "You No Go Die ... Unless" - 7:35
