= Gentleman (Fela Kuti album) =

Studio album by Fela Ransome-Kuti and the Afrika 70
- Released: 1973
- Genre: Afrobeat
- Length: 30:52
- Label: EMI
- Producer: Fela Ransome-Kuti

Fela Kuti chronology
| Afrodisiac (1973) | Gentleman (1973) | Confusion (1975) |

Gentleman is a 1973 studio album by Nigerian Afrobeat musician Fela Kuti. It was written and produced by Kuti and recorded with his Afrika 70 band. The cover artwork's depiction of a monkey's head superimposed on a suited body is a reference to the album's title track, which Kuti composed as a commentary on the colonial mentality of Africans who adhered to European customs and clothing.

== Music and lyrics ==
The album's title track is Kuti's commentary on the colonial mentality of Africans who adhere to European customs and clothing, as referenced by the cover artwork's collage of a monkey's head on a suited body. In the song, he ponders why fellow Africans would wear so much clothing in the African heat: "I know what to wear but my friend don't know / I am not a gentleman like that! / I be Africa man original." He solos on his tenor saxophone over most of the song's nine-minute intro, and switches to his electric piano during the vocal sections. Kuti had learned how to play after the departure of Igo Chico from his Afrika 70 band in 1973. "Gentleman" is followed by two jazzy compositions—"Fefe Naa Efe" and "Igbe".

== Release and reception ==
Gentleman was originally released in 1973 by EMI. In a retrospective review, AllMusic's Sam Samuelson gave the album five stars and called it "both an Afrika 70 and Afro-beat masterpiece." In 2000, MCA Records reissued and bundled Gentleman with Kuti's 1975 album Confusion. It was the last installment in a 10-CD, 20-album reissue project for Kuti. Rob Brunner of Entertainment Weekly gave the reissue an "A", while Robert Christgau from The Village Voice gave it an "A−". In Christgau's opinion, while the horn work that introduces the title track "embodies the contradictions of that song's anti-European message", the album is carried "off into the bush" with "two eight-minute Africanisms". He ranked the reissue number 80 on his dean's list for the Pazz & Jop critics' poll in 2000.

In 2010, Gentleman was bundled again with Confusion by Knitting Factory Records as a part their extensive reissue of Kuti's 45-album discography. Paste magazine's Michaelangelo Matos gave it a score of "9.3/10" and cited it as the "essential twofer" in the reissue series. All About Jazz critic Chris May said that Gentleman and Confusion were "the first major masterpieces in Kuti's canon."

== Track listing ==
All tracks are written by Fela Ransome-Kuti.

Side One
| No. | Title | Length |
|---|---|---|
| 1. | "Gentleman" | 14:32 |

Side Two
| No. | Title | Length |
|---|---|---|
| 1. | "Igbe (Na Shit)" | 8:14 |
| 2. | "Fe Fe Ne Eye Fe" | 8:06 |
| Total length: | | 30:02 |

== Personnel ==
Credits are adapted from the album's liner notes.

- Afrika 70 Organisation – artwork
- Igo Chico – tenor saxophone (tracks 2, 3)
- Fela Ransome-Kuti – alto saxophone, arrangements, electric piano, production, tenor saxophone, vocals
- Peter Obe – photography
- Emmanuel A. Odenusi – engineering, mixing
- Tunde Williams – trumpet
