= Unknown Soldier (Fela Kuti album) =

Studio album by Fela Aníkúlápó Kuti and his Africa 70
- Released: 1979
- Recorded: 1979
- Studio: Phonodisk Studio, Ijebu-Igbo, Ogun, Nigeria
- Genre: Afrobeat
- Length: 31:08
- Label: Skylark; SKLP 003
- Producer: Fela Kuti

Fela Kuti chronology
Shuffering and Shmiling (1977)	Unknown Soldier (1979)	V.I.P. - Vagabonds in Power (1979)

Unknown Soldier is an album by Nigerian Afrobeat composer, bandleader and multi-instrumentalist Fela Kuti, recorded in 1979 and originally released on the Nigerian Skylark label.

== Reception ==
Professional ratings
Review scores
Source	Rating
AllMusic	4.5/5 stars
The New Rolling Stone Album Guide	4/5 stars

AllMusic stated: "An epic 31-minute tribute to his fallen mother, Unknown Soldier is one of the most ambitious recordings of Kuti's career which describes in frightening detail the events that transpired on the eve of the Kalakuta raid.... Kuti gives a tortured, powerful performance of some of his most vivid and incendiary music – music that was in many ways the ideological equal of the physical torture that Kuti and his company had endured".

== Track listing ==
All compositions composed and arranged by Fela Kuti. French lyrics translated by Kwesi Yopee

1. "Unknown Soldier" (Instrumental) – 14:45
2. "Unknown Soldier" (Vocal) – 16:23

== Personnel ==
- Fela Kuti – tenor saxophone, alto saxophone, electric piano, vocals
- Nana Kwame Opoku, Okalue Ojeah – tenor guitar
- Mardo Martino, Tunde Brown – rhythm guitar
- Adekunle Adewala, Kalenky Clement Djalo – bass guitar
- Durotimi Ikujenyo – rhythm piano
- Oyinade Adeniran, Yinusa Akinibosun – tenor saxophone
- Lekan Animashaun – baritone saxophone, leader, soloist
- Mukoro Owieh – second baritone saxophone
- Oye Shobowale – trumpet
- Tony Allen – drums kit
- Nicholas Avom, Maseaswe Anam – drums
- Popoola Awodoye, Okon Etuk Iyang, Moses Emmanuel – congas
- Taiye Ojomo – claves
- Fesobi Olawaiye – maracas
- Alake Anikulapo Kuti, Fehintola Anikulapo Kuti, Folake Anikulapo Kuti, Ihase Anikulapo Kuti, Kevwe Anikulapo Kuti, Omowunmi Anikulapo Kuti, Tejumade Anikulapo Kuti, Tokunbo Anikulapo Kuti – Africa 70 singers

Technical

- Tunde Orimogunje – design
- Femi Osunla – photography
