= Kalakuta Republic =

Fela Kuti's communal compound

Coordinates: 06°36′11″N 003°20′55″E

"Kalakuta Republic" was the name that Nigerian musician and political activist Fela Kuti gave to the communal compound that housed his family, band members, and recording studio. Located at 14 Agege Motor Road, Idi-Oro, Mushin, Lagos, Nigeria, it had a free health clinic and a recording facility. Fela declared it independent from the state ruled by the military junta after he returned from the United States in 1970. The compound burned to the ground on February 18, 1977, after an assault by a thousand armed soldiers.

"Kalakuta" was a mockery of a prison cell named "Calcutta" that Fela inhabited. The name was originally derived from the infamous Black Hole of Calcutta dungeon in India.

Before the attack on Fela's home, he made a record called Zombie, about the Nigerian military regime. In the song, soldiers are called zombies for obeying orders blindly. One of the lines of the song, in West African Pidgin English, says, "Zombie no go walk unless you tell am to walk". Fela was frustrated with the Nigerian army's rank and file that allowed corruption and intimidation of their communities by the corrupt and rich top brass, while blindly following orders to intimidate Nigerians.

The song was popular in Nigeria, upsetting then-Head of State General Olusegun Obasanjo. The military was unhappy with Fela's constant criticism and said it was unseemly to have a republic within a republic. Nigerian tabloids carried lurid but unverified tales of girls lured to the compound and corrupted by Fela's band members.

During the attack at the Kalakuta Republic by the Nigerian Armed Forces, Fela's mother Frances Abigail Olufunmilayo Thomas was thrown from a window of the second floor. She died after being in a coma for about eight weeks.

Fela failed in his initial plan to commemorate the one-year anniversary of the Kalakuta Republic sacking by marrying 27 of his back-up singers in a mass wedding ceremony at the office of his lawyer, Tunji Braithwaite. According to Fela, in Yoruba tradition, when a woman was in danger of being left destitute, it was the duty of a man in her community to marry her as a means of offering protection. Fela said he would not have marital relationships with all of the women as the tabloids suggested, but had married them as they could not find employment after the recording studio had been burnt down. Two days later, on February 20, 1978, he secretly married the 27 women popularly known as "Queens" at the defunct Parisona Hotel along Ikorodu Road in Lagos.

In 2012, Babatunde Fashola, the Governor of Lagos, began an initiative to rebuild the compound and turn it into a museum. The Kalakuta Republic Museum officially opened on October 15, 2012, in commemoration of Fela's 74th birthday. It contains displays of Fela's clothing, instruments and artwork, as well as a restaurant and hotel.
