= Nikki Laoye =

Nigerian singer (born 1980)

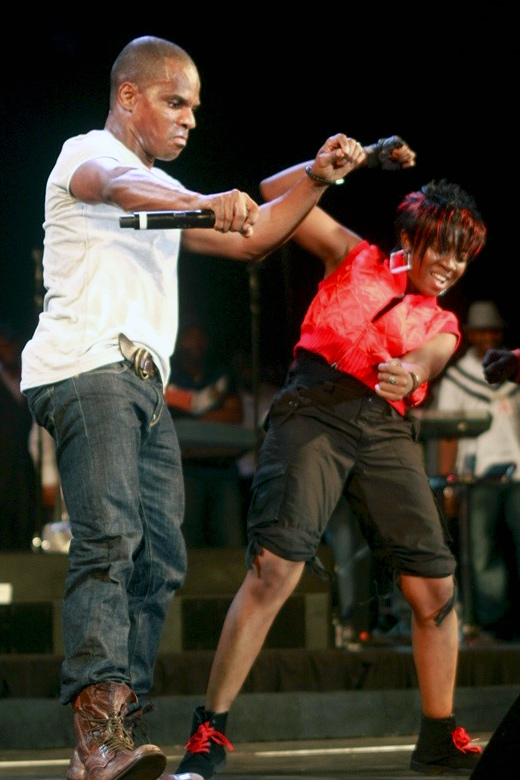
- Nikki Laoye with Kirk Franklin

Background information
- Born: Oyenike Laoye; 19 December 1980 (age 45); Lagos, Nigeria
- Origin: Osun State, Nigeria
- Genres: Gospel; urban contemporary; alternative rock; R&B; pop; hip hop; soul
- Occupations: Singer; songwriter; media personality; actress; humanitarian
- Instrument: Vocals
- Years active: 2005–present
- Label: Wahala Media Entertainment
- Website: reverbnation.com/nikkilaoye

Oyenike Laoye, known professionally as Nikki Laoye, is a Nigerian recording artist, singer, humanitarian, songwriter, dancer and occasional actress, renowned for her musical expressions and stage performances. As a recording artist, Laoye's music has earned her several awards including The Headies Award in 2013 for Best Female Vocal Performance and the All African Music Awards (AFRIMA) in 2014 for Best Female Artiste in African Inspirational Music. She is also well known for the 2006 hit song Never felt this Way before, the 2013 dance single "1-2-3", the soulful ballad "Only You", which she remixed in 2016 featuring Seyi Shay and the love song Onyeuwaoma featuring Banky W.

Her musical style is an urban contemporary sound with the fusion of alternative rock, R&B, hip hop, pop, soul, funk, jazz and Gospel.

== Early life ==
Laoye was born in Lagos, Nigeria; the only daughter to Prince Olushola Isaac Laoye & Olori Christiana Yetunde Laoye. Laoye bears traces of a mixed heritage as her father, Olushola is of European (Dutch), Ghanaian and Nigerian ancestry. She is sister to three brothers Femi, Bola, and Ade, who is also known as Xblaze, a budding young music producer/Hip Hop artist in Lagos, Nigeria. She enrolled in choirs and dance classes at the age of five.

In 1998, Laoye joined the youth band of Ikoyi Baptist Church and was introduced formally to contemporary gospel by friend and music director, Reginald Bassey and served as a soloist/lead vocalist for a couple of years.

In 2000, a chance meeting along the hallways of St. Anne's hall, a private female hostel, at the University of Ibadan brought about the creation of the female girl group, Soul Sistas, composed of Laoye, Debola Kester, and Aboyowa Tene. The girls met during an evening of music, fun and games in their dorm room and struck a chord literally. They started performing together, simply for the love of it and finally took up the name "Soul Sistas" after singing at a campus fellowship the Pastor, Dele Osunmakinde (now Pastor of The Baptizing Church, Lagos) remarked cheerfully "These ladies sing to your soul". In 2003, The girls were joined briefly by another female singer, Funmi Ojo, but returned to a trio within the same year.

Together for five years, Soul Sistas were the only female a cappella group at the University and were renowned for their soulful harmonies including their rendition of the classic a cappella song "Your Love is Better than Life". In 2005, the girls went their separate ways after graduating from the University with Laoye pursuing a solo career and Debola and Aboyowa took up regular jobs. In 2007, the trio returned to record a remix for their hit, "Baba L'oke" for Laoye's debut album, Angel 4 Life. In 2010, Debola contested in the Nigerian music reality show, Project Fame Season 3 and was one of the final 10 contestants alongside Ochuko, Yetunde Omo'badan, Chidinma Ekile (winner).

== Education ==
Laoye started off her education at Grace Children School, Gbagada, Lagos. Soon enough, she was singled out by her music teacher, who noticed her music abilities at such a tender age and personally offered her free piano lessons at the end of each school day. Laoye's musical talent was further enhanced during her high school years at Federal Government Girl's College, Sagamu (from where she graduated in 1998) and at the University of Ibadan respectively as she performed with the school choirs and joined up with music and dance groups including Exousia, Soul Alliance and the girl group trio, Soul Sistas.

== Career ==
Laoye began her career as a solo artist in 2006, with the release of her first single, "Never Felt this Way Before", produced by Nigerian music producer Cobhams Asuquo. The single enjoyed airplay on mainstream radio stations in Nigeria and gained wide acceptance across the country, thus making Laoye one of the few contemporary Christian artists in the Nigerian music industry with mainstream appeal. The release of her HipHop collaboration single, "Taka Sufe" featuring Rooftop Mcs and Rap2Sai further endeared her to Nigerian youths and provided a platform of expression for her brother, Xblaze who produced the track. (Xblaze Ade Laoye produced most of the songs on Laoye's debut album as well as her 2013 dance single, "1-2-3". He was a principal producer for the West African Edition of X-Factor, held in Lagos, Nigeria).

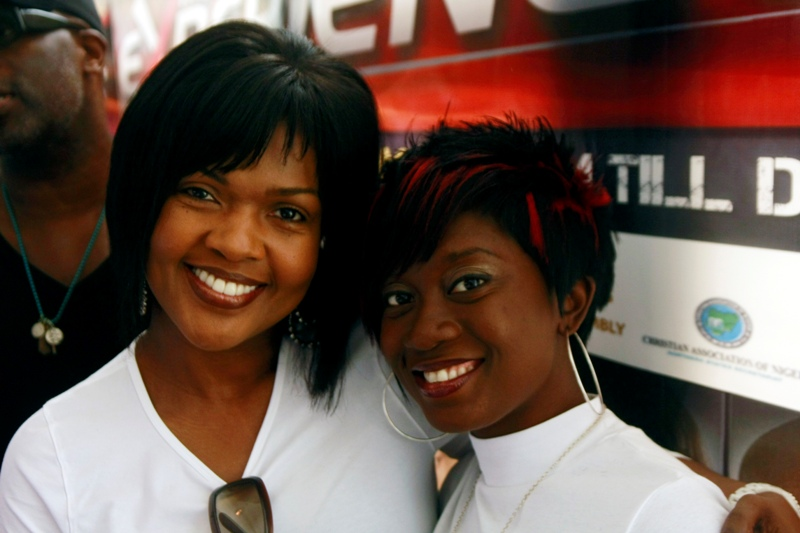
Nikki Laoye with Cece Winans at the Experience 2009 press conference in Lagos, Nigeria

In 2008, Laoye followed up with the release of her debut album Angel 4 Life— a collection of contemporary sounds and a lineup of top Nigerian artists including Rooftop Mcs, Blaise, Jeremiah Gyang and many more. The singer gained notoriety as her singles gradually rose to the number one spot on the Nigerian Chart Show for weeks, and she was a main feature on the MTV Base Rockumentary show- Advance Warning. In 2009, Laoye performed alongside American international gospel artists Kirk Franklin, Cece Winans and Donnie McClurkin to an audience of 500,000 at The 2009 Experience Concert in Lagos, Nigeria. Laoye also played a theatrical role in the Nigerian-Broadway stage play musical, OLURONBI in October 2009 and was one of the five female artists on the 2009 Tetmosol Girl Power Tour, which was a nationwide tour across various states of Nigeria.

The release of the single "Never Felt This Way Before" brought a fresh urban Christian contemporary sound to the Nigerian music industry. The song received critical acclaim and was nominated for several awards, including Best Vocal Performance (Female) and HipHop World Revelation (Best New Artist) at the 2009 Hip Hop World Awards. It also earned nominations at the Kora Awards for Best Spiritual Artist and Best Arrangement, as well as recognition at the 2009 City People Entertainment Awards for Musician of the Year (Female), the 2009 Nigerian Entertainment Awards for Gospel Artist of the Year, and the 2009 SoundCity Music Video Awards for Best Female Video. The track's success elevated Laoye’s profile, earning her the position of the 3rd Best Performance at the 2009 Hip Hop World Awards in Nigeria, behind Darey Art Alade and Tuface, who ranked 1st and 2nd respectively among the 10 performances at the event.

Laoye was the only female contender alongside top male Nigerian Artists – MI, Banky W. and Naeto C for the HipHop World Revelation (Best New Artist) category of the 2009 HipHop World Awards.

In 2009, Laoye performed alongside Kirk Franklin, CeCe Winans, Donnie McClurkin to an audience of 500,000 at The Experience Concert in Lagos.

Laoye's music has gained critical acclaim beyond Africa, as she was one of the first three Nigerian artists ever to be interviewed and recognized on American entertainment channel, BET in 2009 and she was one of the preliminary judges for BET's Sunday Best Auditions which held in Lagos, Nigeria in December 2009. In 2011, Laoye's life and career were showcased in a special feature segment on BET, tagged "BET Spotlight – Nikki Laoye".

In 2013, the singer made a comeback into the music scene after being on a hiatus following the loss of her father in 2011.

Laoye was commissioned to record her own version of the Nigerian National Anthem for Nigerian TV Producer, Mo Abudu's Ebony Life Television in June 2013. The video is renowned as the first official music video for the Nigerian Anthem. Since its release in June 2013, Laoye has been invited to perform the anthem for the Presidency in Aso Rock, Abuja and at other official functions. As at 2013, she released the singles "No Be Beans" with Yoruba Hip Hop artist Base One; the dance single "1-2-3"; and the Rotimi Keys produced ballad "Only You", a song dedicated to the memory of her late father, for which she won an award for the Best Vocal Performance (Female) at the 2013 Headies Awards in Lagos, Nigeria.

Laoye also lends her vocal signature on radio jingles some of which include Etisalat's "0809aija 4 Life", which featured R&B singer Banky W, MTN's "Everywhere You Go" jingle and Fidelity Bank's "No Greater Feeling". The singer has performed film soundtracks for major Nollywood productions such as Bent Arrows, Where the Heart Lies, Mission 2 Nowhere and the ensemble film Journey to Self.

Laoye is also an on-air personality on television and radio. In 2005 she hosted the TV Show New Breeze Show on Silverbird Entertainment Television and as of 2013, she hosts her own radio show, Girls Rock with Nikki Laoye on Nigerian internet gospel radio station Praiseworld Radio. She was also unveiled as one of the hosts for a gospel reality TV competition, Stars 4 Christ.

In August 2013, Laoye headlined the Nigerian Corner at the Nottinghill Carnival in the United Kingdom, an event which attracts thousands of Nigerians living across the United Kingdom. In the same year, Laoye went on a church tour of England, which took her to London, Manchester, Loughton and Warrington. In September 2013, Laoye performed alongside R&B legend Mary J. Blige at the "Sisters with Soul" concert in Lagos, Nigeria.

Laoye headlined the 2014 Headies Awards as well as the 10th Anniversary of the Rhythm Unplugged Concert in December 2014.

In January 2016, Laoye headlined the Butterscotch Evenings event, alongside American R&B Superstar Brian Mcknight at the Eko Hotels and Suites in Lagos, Nigeria. On 12 February 2016, two days to Valentine's Day, Laoye released a Love duet with Nigerian R&B singer Banky W titled Onyeuwaoma, the song enjoyed rave reviews and the official video was released on 14 April 2016.

== Personal life ==
On 11 December 2011, Laoye married Alexander Oturu in Lagos, Nigeria. The two separated after seven years of marriage due to possible irreconcilable differences. The couple do not have any children together.

== Philanthropy ==
In December 2010, Laoye founded the "Angel 4 Life Foundation", a non-governmental organization through which she mentors and helps develop the creative skills of talented physically challenged youths and also assists in the management of the Music Therapy Clinic of Modupe Cole Home for the Physically and Mentally Challenged, in Lagos, Nigeria.

In October 2012, Laoye's Angel 4 Life Foundation, in conjunction with the Nigeria Association of the Blind (Lagos Chapter, Nigeria) celebrated the 2012 International White Cane Day, the event consisted of a Sing for the Blind unplugged fundraising gig on the hallways of The Palms Shopping Mall in Lekki with support from celebrities such as Sammie Okposo, Funke Kuti, Tiwa Savage, Dipp, Lamboginny and Kiki Omeili a White Cane Awareness Walk and a Lunch Reception to celebrate the achievements and independence of all visually impaired citizens of Lagos State.

Her passion for humanitarian activities attracted the attention of the Nigerian National Commission for Refugees, Migrants, and Internally Displaced Persons (NCFRMI), who unveiled her as the celebrity 'Voice of Refugees' in Southwest Nigeria in 2013.

On 25 December 2012 and 2013, the foundation hosted Christmas Day Out with Laoye providing whole-day trips and treats around the city of Lagos for physically challenged youths. The fundraising foundation also handles The Art in Me project, an empowerment initiative for creative physically challenged youths. With the help of a Guaranty Trust Bank Training school set, Angel 4 Life helped to build a fully functional music recording studio for physically challenged producer, Akeem at Modupe Cole Home, Yaba, Lagos.

In 2013, Laoye was given an honorary 234Giver Award for her advocacy and contribution to the social and educational development of the physically challenged in Nigeria. The award was presented by 234Give, Nigeria's first online fundraising platform – a company dedicated to empowering individuals and companies to raise funds for causes that improve and uplift their communities.

== Discography ==
Studio albums

- Angel 4 Life (2008)
- The 123 Project (2014)

== Videography ==
Year	Title	Choreographer	Director
2016	"Onyeuwaoma"	Nikki Laoye/Banky W	Frizzle and Bizzle Films
2015	"African Dance"	Temisan/Nikki Laoye	Frizzle and Bizzle Films
2014	"123"	Temisan/Nikki Laoye	Frizzle and Bizzle Films
2013	"Only You"	Nikki Laoye	Shabach
2013	"Nigerian National Anthem"		EbonyLife Television
2010	"Taka Sufe (Remix)"	Nikki Laoye	Frizzle and Bizzle Films
2007	"Never Felt This Way Before"	Nikki Laoye	Clarence Peters

== Recognition and awards ==
Laoye's work has earned her numerous award nominations and accolades including the prestigious KORA Awards, HipHop World Awards (now Headies), Soundcity Music Video Awards, City People Entertainment Awards, NEA Awards (US), Nigeria Music Video Awards (NMVA); Africa Gospel Music Awards (UK), Crystal Gospel Awards, Nigeria Gospel Music Awards (NGMA), and a special feature on MTVBase Advance Warning Reality TV Show. She was announced as one of the brand ambassadors for the popular wristwatch, Ice Watch, in Nigeria.

On 26 December 2013, Laoye was unveiled as the winner of the category of Best Vocal Performance (Female) for her soulful ballad "Only You" in a strong field that included singers Waje, Niyola, Seyi Shay and Zaina, at The Headies 2013 Award ceremony in Lagos, Nigeria.

In April 2014, Laoye was unveiled as 'The Voice for Refugees' in southwest Nigeria, by the National Commission for Refugees, Migrants and Internally Displaced Persons (NCFRMI). As part of her role as a celebrity voice, she has appeared at various events organized by the commission to enlighten the general public about the travails of refugees and internally displaced persons. She has also donated to the cause and performed at several events supporting the cause.

On May 21, 2014, Laoye received a nomination for Best Gospel Artiste at the 2014 African Muzik Magazine Awards (AFRIMMA). Later that month, she was also nominated for Best Gospel Artiste of the Year at the Nigerian Entertainment Awards (NEA).

On July 20, 2014, Laoye won the Crystal Award for Best Worship Song for her track "Only You" at the 2014 Crystal Awards in Lagos, Nigeria. She was also nominated in the Artiste of the Year and Best Female Vocalist categories at the event. On August 24, 2014, at Fairfield Hall in Croydon, London, Laoye received the award for Female Artiste of the Year at the 2014 Africa Gospel Music Awards (AGMA). She was also nominated for Artiste of the Year (West Africa) at the same ceremony.

On August 19, 2015, Laoye was honored with the Humanitarian of the Year Award by the World Hope Foundation in recognition of her humanitarian efforts, coinciding with the commemoration of World Humanitarian Day 2015.

=== Musical awards and recognition ===
Year	Nominee / work	Award	Result
2009	"Never Felt This Way Before"	2009 Hip Hop World Awards: Best Vocal Performance (Female)	Nominated
2009	"Never Felt This Way Before"	2009 Hip Hop World Awards: Hip Hop World Revelation (Best New Artist)	Nominated
2009	"Never Felt This Way Before"	Kora Awards: Best Spiritual Artist	Nominated
2009	"Never Felt This Way Before"	Kora Awards: Best Arrangement	Nominated
2009	"Never Felt This Way Before"	Sound City Music Video Awards: Best Female Video	Nominated
2009	Nikki Laoye	City People Entertainment Awards: Musician of the Year (Female)	Nominated
2009	Nikki Laoye	Nigeria Entertainment Awards: Gospel Artist of the Year	Nominated
2010	"Taka Sufe"	Nigerian Music Video Awards: Best Afro-Hip Hop Video	Nominated
2010	"Taka Sufe"	Nigerian Music Video Awards: "Best Gospel Video"	Nominated
2013	"Only You"	African Gospel Music Awards: Song of the Year	Nominated
2013	"Only You"	Nigerian Gospel Music Awards: Worship Song of the Year	Nominated
2013	"123"	Crystal Gospel Awards: Song of the Year	Nominated
2013	Nigerian National Anthem	Nigerian Gospel Music Video Awards: Best Goodwill Video	Nominated
2013	"Only You"	Gospel Music Awards, Italy: Best International Song of the Year	Nominated
2013	Nikki Laoye	Gospel Music Awards, Italy: Best International Female Artist of the Year	Nominated
2013	Nikki Laoye	Gospel Music Awards, Italy: Best International Gospel Hip-Hop of the Year	Nominated
2013	'123'	Nigerian Gospel Music Awards: Song of the Year	Won
2013	"Only You"	The Headies 2013: Best Vocal Performance (Female)	Won
2014	Nikki Laoye	African Muzik Magazine Awards (AFRIMMA): Best Gospel Artiste	Nominated
2014	Nikki Laoye	2014 Nigeria Entertainment Awards: Gospel Artist of the Year	Nominated
2014	Nikki Laoye	The Crystal Awards: Artist of the Year	Nominated
2014	Nikki Laoye	The Crystal Awards: Best Female Vocalist	Nominated
2014	Nikki Laoye	Africa Gospel Music Awards: Female Artist of the Year	Won
2014	Nikki Laoye	Africa Gospel Music Awards: Artiste of the Year (West Africa)	Nominated
2014	"Only You"	The Crystal Awards: Best Worship Song	Won
2014	"Only You"	Nigerian Music Video Awards (NMVA): Best Soft Rock/Alternative Video	Won
2014	"Only You"	All Africa Music Awards (AFRIMA): Best Female Artiste in African Inspirational Music	Won
2015	"African Dance"	Yadamag Readers' Choice Awards: Music Video of the Year	Won
2015	Nikki Laoye	African Muzik Magazine Awards (AFRIMMA): Best Gospel Artiste	Nominated
2015	"123"	The Crystal Awards: Video of the Year	Nominated

=== Humanitarian recognition and awards ===
Year	Organization	Award
2013	234Give	234Giver Award for Advocacy and contribution to the Social and Educational Development of the Physically Challenged
2015	World Hope Foundation	Humanitarian of the Year
2015	Project ASHA, UK	Honorary Award for Service to the Less Privileged
2015	Exquisite Lady of the Year (ELOY)	Special Recognition Award for Ladies who inspire in the Humanitarian/Charity /Community Work

== See also ==
- List of Nigerian gospel musicians
