= Songs About You =

Songs About You may refer to:

- "Songs About You" (song), by Kira Isabella
- Songs About You (album), by Brett Eldredge, or its title track
- Songs About U, album by Banky W.
- "Song About You", by Mike Posner
