= City People Entertainment Awards =

Award ceremony in Nigeria

- Awarded for: Excellence in Nigeria and Ghana entertainment
- Country: Nigeria
- Presented by: City People Magazine
- First award: 2009
- Website: citypeopleonline.com

City People Entertainment Awards are annual awards presented by City People Magazine to honour Nigerian and Ghanaian entertainers. The first edition was held in Abeokuta, Ogun State on 14 June 2009. The event was hosted by Governor Gbenga Daniel at the State House. The ceremony was last held on 22 June 2014 at 10 Degrees Event Centre, Lagos State.

== 2017 division ==
In 2017, the awards were divided into "City People Music Awards" and "City People Movie Awards". These awards are distinct from the "City People Awards For Excellence" which is a separate awards ceremony by the same organiser, which recognises achievements in fields beyond entertainment with categories such as "Lifetime Achievement Award", "Businessman of the Year", "Male Achiever of the Year" among others. GoldMyne TV was nominated for Online TV of the Year

== Categories ==
The following are the award categories:

- Recognition Award
- Best Vocal Artiste (Male)
- Best Vocal Artiste (Female)
- Legendary Award
- Indigenous Act Award
- Pop/Rock Act with Potential Award
- Male Act with Potential Award
- Female Act with Potential Award
- Highlife Act with Potential Award
- Hip Hop Act with Potential Award
- Indigenous Act with Potential Award
- Gospel Music Icon Award
- Most Promising Artiste (Male)
- Most Promising Artiste (Female)
- Best Lyrical Exploration/Lyricist (Male/Female)
- Best Afro Hip Hop Single
- Highlife Act with Potential
- Best Gospel Music Video
- Best Recording with A-list Act
- Best Indigenous Single
- Emerging Male Act with Potential
- Emerging Female Act with Potential
- Emerging Gospel Act of the Year
- Recording of the Year
- Best Nigerian International Act
- Best Performing Act

=== Movie ===
- Best Actress of the Year (English)
- Best Actor of the Year (English)
- Nollywood Face of the Year
- Best New Actor of the Year (English)
- Best New Actress of the Year (English)
- Best Supporting Actor of the Year (English)
- Best Supporting Actress of the Year (English)
- Best Movie of the Year (English)
- Best Movie Producer of the Year (English)
- Best Movie Marketer of the Year (English)
- Best Director of the Year (English)
- Comic Actor of the Year (English)
- Most Promising Act of the Year
- Best Actor of the Year (Yoruba)
- Best Actress of the Year (Yoruba)
- Best New Actor of the Year (Yoruba)
- Best New Actress of the Year (Yoruba)
- Best Supporting Actor of the Year (Yoruba)
- Best Supporting Actress of the Year (Yoruba)
- Best Movie of the Year (Yoruba)
- Best Movie Producer of the Year (Yoruba)
- Best Movie Marketer of the Year (Yoruba)
- Movie Director of the Year (Yoruba)
- Most Promising Actress of the Year (Yoruba)
- Most Promising Actor of the Year (Yoruba)
- Comic Actor of the Year (Yoruba)

=== Kannywood ===
- Best Actor of the Year
- Best Actress of the Year
- Best Supporting Actor of the Year
- Best Supporting Actress of the Year
- Best New Actor of the Year
- Best New Actress of the Year
- Best Director of the Year
- Best Producer of the Year
- Best Musician of the Year
- Best Film of the Year

=== Ghana ===
- Best Actress of the Year Award
- Best Supporting Actor of the Year Award
- Best Supporting Actress of the Year Award
- Entertainment Company of the Year Award
- Best Showbiz-friendly Company of the Year Award
- Face of Ghana Movies Award
- Best Movie of the Year Award
- Hottest Ghanaian Actress in Hollywood

==== Movies ====
- Best Actor of the Year (G)
- Best Actress of the Year (Ghana)
- Best Supporting Actor of the Year (Ghana)
- Best Supporting Actress of the Year (Ghana)
- Entertainment Company of the Year
- Best New Actress of the Year (Ghana)
- Best Showbiz-friendly Company of the Year (Ghana)
- Face of Ghana Movies Award
- Best Movie of the Year (Ghana)
- Hottest Ghanaian Actress In Nollywood
- Most Promising Actress of the Year

==== Music ====
- Musician of the Year (Male)
- Musician of the Year (Female)
- TV Station with Best Showbiz Content (Ghana)
- Radio Station with Best Showbiz Content (Ghana)
- Showbiz Blogger/Online Writer of the Year (Ghana)
- TV Hostess of the Year (Ghana)

== Past award categories ==
Popular Song of the Year (2016-2020)
Year	Recipient	Result
2016	HarrySong – "Reggae Blues"	Won
2017	Davido – "If"	Won
2018	Mr Real featuring Idowest, Kelvin Chuks & Odadice – "Legbegbe"	Won
2020	Asake – "Mr. Money"	Won
City People Next Rated Artiste (Male)
Year	Recipient(s) and nominee(s)	Result
2020	Bella Shmurda	Won
2020	Omah Lay	Nominated
2020	Oxlade	Nominated
2020	Cheque	Nominated
2020	Bad Boy Timz	Nominated
2020	Wizpec	Nominated
2020	Zinoleesky	Nominated
Music Artist of the Year (Female)
Year	Recipient(s) and nominee(s)	Result
2016	Simi	Won
2017	Tiwa Savage	Won
2017	Niniola	Nominated
2017	Yemi Alade	Nominated
2017	Seyi Shay	Nominated
2017	Aramide	Nominated
2017	Simi	Nominated
Music Artist of the Year (Male)
Year	Recipient(s) and nominee(s)	Result
2016	Kizz Daniel	Won
2017	Harrysong	Won
2017	Davido	Nominated
2017	Tekno	Nominated
2017	Runtown	Nominated
2017	Kizz Daniel	Nominated
2017	Wizkid	Nominated
2017	Olamide	Nominated
2018	Mayokun	Won
Best Collaboration
Year	Recipient(s) and nominee(s)	Result
2016	Humblesmith featuring. Davido – "Osinachi Remix"	Won
2017	Adekunle Gold featuring Simi – "No Forget"	Won
2017	Ycee featuring Maleek Berry – "Juice"	Nominated
2017	Phyno featuring P-Square – "Financial Woman"	Nominated
2017	Illbliss featuring Reekado Banks, Mr Eazi – "Jawonlaya"	Nominated
Rap Act of the Year
Year	Recipient(s) and nominee(s)	Result
2020	CDQ	Won
Comedy Act of the Year
Year	Recipient(s) and nominee(s)	Result
2020	Mr Macaroni	Won
