= Aramide (name) =

Nigerian Given Name

Arámìdé
- Gender: Unisex
- Language: Yoruba

Origin
- Language: Nigerian
- Meaning: My company, kin, or relative, has arrived
- Region of origin: Southwest

Other names
- Variant form: Adémìdé Ayomìdé Ọlámidé Olúwagbọ́lámidé
- Short form: Arámì Midé

Arámìdé is a Nigerian unisex name of Yoruba descent meaning "My company, kin, or relative, has arrived". It is mostly given to first-born male or female child to signify anticipated addition to the family.

== Notable people bearing the name ==
- Aramide Oteh, English Footballer
- Aramide, Nigerian Soul-singer and Songwriter
