= R&BW =

Studio album by Banky W
- Released: 14 February 2013
- Recorded: 2012–2013
- Genre: R&B
- Length: 67:00
- Label: Empire Mates Entertainment
- Producer: Banky W; Cobhams Asuquo; Masterkraft; M.I; Spellz; Sarz; Samklef

Banky W chronology
Empire Mates State of Mind (2012)	R&BW (2013)	Songs About U (2017)

Singles from R&BW
- 1. "Yes/No" Released: 19 November 2012; 2. "Good Good Loving" Released: 19 November 2012

R&BW is the fourth studio album by Nigerian singer Banky W. It was released by Empire Mates Entertainment on 14 February 2013, coinciding with Valentine's Day. The album was supported by the singles "Yes/No", which peaked at number 1 on the BBC Radio 1Xtra Afrobeat chart, and "Good Good Loving". R&BW features guest appearances from Camp Mulla, eLDee, Sarkodie, Sammy, Shaydee, Skales, Lynxxx, Niyola, M.I, 2Face Idibia, Rotimi and Vector. Its production was handled by Banky W, Cobhams Asuquo, Masterkraft, M.I, Spellz, Sarz, and Samklef.

== Background and promotion ==
Banky W revealed the album's cover art to the public several days after signing a 100 million naira contract with Samsung West Africa. The cover art was designed by the Eclectic Source, a design company. Banky W promoted the album by holding the "Grand Love Concert" at the Civic Centre in Victoria Island.

== Singles ==
The album's lead single, "Yes/No", was released on 19 November 2012. Its music video was co-directed by Banky W and Clarence Peters. British-Nigerian model Angela Tokunbo Daniel made a cameo appearance in the video.

The Spellz-produced track "Good Good Loving" was also released on 19 November 2012, as the album's second single. The song's visuals feature cameo appearances from Damilola Adegbite, Wizkid, BOJ, Lynxxx, Efya, ELDee, Skales, Niyola, P.R.E, Shaydee and Masterkraft. "Good Good Loving" won Best R&B Single at The Headies 2013.

== Critical reception ==
Professional ratings
Review scores
Source	Rating
Jaguda	9/10
TayoTV	8.75/10
TooXclusive	4.5/5 stars
Lumeviews	4/5 stars
Nigerian Entertainment Today	3.5/5 stars

R&BW received generally positive reviews from music critics. TayoTV rated the album 8.75 out of 10, concluding: "Banky made it known that he still has it and The W Experience wasn’t a fluke. This is what we want out of Nigeria not the glorified noise most of these artistes call songs or albums." Music blog Jaguda awarded the album a rating of 9 out of 10, saying it doesn't "lack in originality and freshness". Chiagoziem Onyekwena of Nigerian Entertainment Today gave the album 3.5 stars out of 5, highlighting Wizkid's absence on the record.

=== Accolades ===
R&BW was nominated for Best R&B/Pop Album and Album of the Year at the 2013 edition of The Headies.

== Track listing ==
No.	Title	Producer(s)	Length
1.	"The Way"	Spellz	3:55
2.	"Good Good Loving"	Spellz	3:31
3.	"Magic" (featuring Skales)	Cobhams Asuquo	4:12
4.	"Find You"	Sarz	4:13
5.	"Yes/No"	Cobhams Asuquo	4:07
6.	"Low Key"	Sarz	4:17
7.	"Do It to Me"	Samklef	3:32
8.	"Be My Lover (Yes/No, Pt. 2)" (featuring Niyola)	Masterkraft	3:58
9.	"Say" (featuring Sammy, Shaydee and Rotimi)	Masterkraft	6:30
10.	"Past My Past" (featuring Shaydee)	Masterkraft	4:50
11.	"To My Unborn Child" (featuring Lynxxx)	Masterkraft	4:34
12.	"African & Proud" (featuring Sarkodie, Camp Mulla, L Tido, and Vector)	Masterkraft	5:04
13.	"Never Let You Go"	Banky W	3:36
14.	"Good Good Loving (Remix)" (featuring 2Face Idibia)	Spellz	4:10
15.	"More" (featuring M.I and ELDee)	M.I	4:06
16.	"Mercy"	Maskerkraft	5:07
Total length:			67:00

== Personnel ==
- Olubankole Wellington – primary artist, producer, executive producer
- Cobhams Asuquo – producer
- Masterkraft – producer
- Jude Abaga – producer, featured artist
- Spellz – producer
- Sarz – producer
- Samklef – producer
- Taio Tripper – featured artist
- Shappa Man – featured artist
- Miss Karun – featured artist
- Lanre Dabiri – featured artist
- Michael Owusu Addo – featured artist
- Sammy – featured artist
- Shadrach Adeboye – featured artist
- Eniola Akinbo – featured artist
- Raoul John Njeng-Njeng – featured artist
- Chukie Edozien – featured artist
- Innocent Ujah Idibia – featured artist
- Olanrewaju Ogunmefun – featured artist
