= Osinachi (song) =

2015 single by Humblesmith

Single by Humblesmith featuring Phyno
- Released: 10 August 2015
- Recorded: 2015
- Genre: Afropop; gospel; highlife
- Length: 3:59
- Label: N-Tyze
- Songwriters: Ekenedilichukwu Ijemba; Chibuzor Azubuike
- Producer: Mixta Dimz

Humblesmith singles chronology
"Love Me" (2015)	"Osinachi" (2015)	"Osinachi (Remix)" (2016)

Phyno singles chronology
"Am on Fire" (2015)	"Osinachi" (2015)	"Knack Am" (2015)

"Osinachi" is a song by Nigerian afropop recording artist Humblesmith. It is referenced as the song that shot Humblesmith's music career to limelight.

== Composition ==
"Osinachi" (English: from God) is a gospel-afro pop-infused highlife song. The lyrical content centres on thanksgiving and appreciation to God. In an interview with The Sun, Humblesmith revealed that he got the inspiration for the song in a church.

== Reception ==
Upon its release on 10 August 2015, "Osinachi" was received to positive reviews and gained rotational airplay in Nigeria. At the 2016 Nigeria Entertainment Awards, the song was nominated in the "Hottest Single" category.

== Remix version ==
"Osinachi (Remix)"

Single by Humblesmith featuring Davido
- Released: February 8, 2016
- Recorded: 2016
- Genre: gospel; afropop; highlife
- Length: 4:27
- Label: N-Tyze
- Songwriters: Ekenedilichukwu Ijemba; David Adeleke
- Producers: Mixta Dimz; Humblesmith

Humblesmith singles chronology
"Love Me" (2015)	"Osinachi (Remix)" (2016)	"Jukwese" (2016)

Davido singles chronology
"Hookah" (2015)	"Osinachi (Remix)" (2016)	"Wait" (2016)

The remix version of the song was released on 8 January 2016 and features guest vocals from Nigerian recording artist Davido.

== Controversy ==
Following the release of the remix version of "Osinachi", the local media criticised Davido for using the song as a way of addressing personal issues he had with Sophia and Dele Momodu, Momodu later debunked suggestions of discord between him and Davido and further stated that, "Davido is my son and so you can't have issues with your son".

== Music video ==
The music video for the first version of the song was directed by Adasa Cookey and was shot at different locations in Lagos State. It premiered on 11 September 2015 via video-sharing website YouTube. On 31 January 2016, the music video for the remix was released. It was shot by Clarence Peters.

== Release history ==
List of release dates, showing region, formats, label, editions and reference
Region	Date	Format(s)	Label	Edition(s)	Ref.
Nigeria	10 August 2015	digital download	N-Tyze Entertainment	Standard	

== Accolades ==
Year	Award ceremony	Prize	Result	Ref
2015	Nigerian Music Video Awards	Best Gospel Video	Won	
2016	Nigeria Entertainment Awards	Hottest Single of the Year	Nominated	
2016	City People Entertainment Awards	Collabo of the Year	Won	
2016	The Headies	Best Pop Single	Nominated	
2016	The Headies	Best Collabo	Nominated	
2016	The Headies	Song of the Year	Nominated	
