= 11th Headies Awards =

Nigerian music industry awards

Headies 2016
- Official poster
- Date: 22 December 2016
- Location: Eko Convention Centre, Victoria Island, Lagos
- Hosted by: Falz, Adesua Etomi

Highlights
- Most awards: Olamide (4)
- Most nominations: Olamide (8)
- Website: theheadies.com

Television/radio coverage
- Network: HipTV

The Headies 2016 was the 11th edition of The Headies. It was held on 22 December 2016 at the Eko Convention Centre in Victoria Island, Lagos. Themed "Think, Create, Recreate." The event was hosted by Adesua Etomi and Falz. The nominees were announced by the award's organizers in November 2016. Tekno was nominated for the Next Rated award, but ended up being disqualified due to his refusal to honour the category and support the campaign. Jazzman Olofin and Adewale Ayuba jointly performed the song "Raise the Roof". Aramide performed her song "Funmi Lowo" with assistance from Ras Kimono. The ceremony also featured additional performances from Falz, 2Baba, Seyi Shay and Flavour. Olamide received eight nominations and won a total of four, including Best Rap Single for his single "Eyan Mayweather". Mr Eazi won the Next Rated category and was awarded a SUV at a later date. Mayorkun toppled Dice Ailes and Koker for the Rookie of the Year award. Laolu Akins was honored with the Hall of Fame award, while Flavour received the Special Recognition award.

== Performances ==
Artist	Song
Falz	"Soft Work"
The Remedies	"Sade"
Jazzman Olofin; Adewale Ayuba	"Raise the Roof"
Daddy Showkey	"Diana"
Aramide; Ras Kimono	"Funmi Lowo"
Humblesmith	"Osinachi"
2Baba	"Searching"
Seyi Shay	
Flavour	

== Presenters ==
- Helen Paul – presented the award for Best Street Hop Artiste
- Zaki Adzay – presented the award for Best Reggae/Dancehall Single
- Osagie Alonge and Toni Tones – presented the award for Best Alternative Song
- Uti Nwachukwu and Adunni Ade – presented the award for Best Pop Single
- Sarah Ofili and DJ Obi – presented the award for Best R&B Single
- Mai Atafo and Adedoja Allen – presented the award for Producer of the Year
- Kcee and Harrysong – presented the award for Best Recording of the Year
- Eva Alordiah and Yaw – presented the award for Lyricist on the Roll
- Ali Baba – presented the Hall of Fame award
- Toke Makinwa and Ubi Franklin – presented the award for Best Rap Single
- Sound Sultan and Ushbebe – presented the award for Best Rap Album
- Osas Ighodaro and Gbenro Ajibade – presented the award for Best Pop Album
- 2Baba – presented the award for Hip Hop World Revelation of the Year
- Funke Akindele and Lolo1 – presented the award for Best Collabo
- Darey and Lami Philips – presented the Song of the Year award
- Ayo Makun and Mr. Arogundade – presented the Next Rated award
- Bovi – presented the award for Album of the Year
- Kenny Ogungbe and AFRIMA director – presented the Special Recognition award

== Winners and nominees ==
Best R&B/Pop Album	Best Rap Album
New Era – Kizz Daniel; Wanted – Wande Coal; Klĭtôrĭs – Brymo; Naked – Darey; Seyi or Shay – Seyi Shay	Powerful – Illbliss; Eyan Mayweather – Olamide; Stories that Touch – Falz; Y.A.G.I – Lil Kesh
Best R&B Single	Best Pop Single
"Pray for Me" – Darey (featuring the Soweto Gospel Choir); "Love Don't Care" – Simi; "Made for You" – Banky W; "Super Woman" – Wande Coal; "Aduke" – Tjan; "Smile" – Shaydee	"Reggae Blues" – Harrysong (featuring Orezi, Iyanya, Olamide and Kcee); "Mama" – Kizz Daniel; "Final (Baba Nla)" – Wizkid; "Pick Up" – Adekunle Gold; "Osinachi" (Remix) – Humblesmith (featuring Davido); "Emergency" – D'banj; "Fada Fada" – Phyno (featuring Olamide); "Money" – Timaya (featuring Flavour)
Best Vocal Performance (Male)	Best Vocal Performance (Female)
Shaydee – "Smile"; Brymo – "Something Good is Happening"; Darey – "Pray for Me" (featuring the Soweto Gospel Choir); Wande Coal – "Super Woman"; Ric Hassani – "Gentlemen"	Simi – "Love Don't Care"; Seyi Shay – "Right Now"; Aramide – "Love Me" (featuring Adekunle Gold); Omawumi – "Play Na Play" (featuring Angélique Kidjo)
Best Rap Single	Best Street-Hop Artiste
"Eyan Mayweather" – Olamide; "Asalamalekun" – Reminisce; "Jagaban" – Ycee; "Chukwu Agozi Go Gi" – Illbliss; "Agu Ji Ndi Men" – A-Q; "Show You Something" – Boogey	Olamide – "Who You Epp?"; Ajebutter22 – "Bad Gang" (featuring Falz); Koker – "Kolewerk"; Ycee – "Jagaban"; Small Doctor – "Gbera"; 2T Boys – "Customer Dada Ni"
Best Collabo	Lyricist on the Roll
"Soldier" – Falz (featuring Simi); "Reggae Blues" – Harrysong (featuring Orezi, Iyanya, Olamide and Kcee); "Osinachi" (Remix) – Humblesmith (featuring Davido); "Wait" – Solid Star (featuring Tiwa Savage); "No Kissing Baby" – Patoranking (featuring Sarkodie); "Money" – Timaya (featuring Flavour)	Illbliss – "Chukwu Agozi Go Gi"; Reminisce – "Asamalekun"; Ycee – "Jagaban"; Boogey – "Show You Something"; A-Q – "Agu Ji Ndi Men"; Mode 9 – "No Matter What"
Song of the Year	Best Recording of the Year
"Fada Fada" – Phyno (featuring Olamide); "Final (Baba Nla)" – Wizkid; "Osinachi" (Remix) – Humblesmith (featuring Davido); "Pick Up" – Adekunle Gold; "Reggae Blues" – Harrysong (featuring Orezi, Iyanya, Olamide and Kcee)	"Pray for Me" – Darey (featuring the Soweto Gospel Choir); "Emergency" – D'banj; "Love Don't Care" – Simi; "Orente" – Adekunle Gold; "Something Good is Happening" - Brymo
Album of the Year	Artiste of the Year
New Era – Kizz Daniel; Stories that Touch – Falz; Wanted – Wande Coal; Seyi or Shay – Seyi Shay	Wizkid; Tiwa Savage; Falz; Yemi Alade; Olamide
Producer of the Year	Best Music Video
Young John – "Mama"; DJ Coublon – "Good Time", "Raba"; Pheelz – "Pick Up", "Lagos Boys"; Legendury Beatz – "Final (Baba Nla)"; Oscar Heman-Ackah – "Pray for Me"	"Soldier" – Clarence Peters; "Emergency" – Unlimited L.A; "Mary" – Meji Alabi; "Made for You" – Banky W.; "Bad" – Sesan Ogunro
Next Rated	African Artiste of the Year
Mr Eazi; Ycee; Tekno; Humblesmith; Aramide	(Kenya) Sauti Sol; (South Africa) Cassper Nyovest; (South Africa) DJ Maphorisa; (Ghana) Stonebwoy; (Ghana) Sarkodie
Rookie of the Year	Best Reggae/Dancehall Single
Mayorkun; MzKiss; Dice Ailes; Koker; Terry Apala; Dremo	"No Kissing Baby" – Patoranking (featuring Sarkodie); "Body Hot" – Praiz (featuring Jesse Jagz and Stonebwoy); "Jagga Love" – Jesse Jagz; "Olowo" – Cynthia Morgan; "Pam Pam" – Ketchup; "I Like the Way" – Timaya
Best Alternative Song	Special Recognition Award
"You Suppose Know" – Bez; "Pick Up" – Adekunle Gold; "Something Good is Happening" – Brymo; "Wait for Me" – Johnny Drille; "Gentleman" – Ric Hassani	Flavour
Hip Hop World Revelation of the Year	Hall of Fame
Kizz Daniel – New Era; Seyi Shay – Seyi or Shay; Lil Kesh – Y.A.G.I; Runtown – Ghetto University	Laolu Akins
