= New Era (Kiss Daniel album) =

Studio album by Kiss Daniel
- Released: 14 May 2016
- Recorded: 2014–2016
- Genre: Hip hop, Afropop
- Length: 67:51
- Label: G-Worldwide Entertainment
- Producer: Emperor Geezy (exec.); DJ Coublon; Young Jonn; Beatburx; Jay Sleek; Masterkraft; Kimzbeatz

Kiss Daniel chronology
New Era (2016)	No Bad Songz (2018)

Singles from New Era
- 1. "Woju" Released: September 1, 2014; 2. "Laye" Released: May 1, 2015; 3. "Good Time" Released: November 20, 2015; 4. "Mama" Released: April 4, 2016

New Era is the debut studio album of Nigerian recording artist Kiss Daniel. Originally scheduled to be released on 1 May 2016, the album was however released on 14 May 2016 through G-Worldwide Entertainment; the album contains hit singles "Woju", "Laye", "Good Times" and "Mama".

== Background and release ==
Kiss Daniel began recording New Era in 2014 following the release of "Woju" on 3 September 2014. The album's cover art and track list were revealed on 14 March 2016 and 3 May 2016 respectively. The album contains 20 songs with only label mate Sugarboy making vocal appearance.

On 15 May 2016, an album concert promoting the release of the album was organized at Eko Hotel and Suites with notable and established entertainers like 2face Idibia, Vector, Cynthia Morgan, Tekno Miles, Yemi Alade, Ayo Makun, Wande Coal, Banky W, Patoranking, Burna Boy in attendance.

== Commercial performance ==
Upon its release, New Era debuted at #8 on the Billboard World Album Chart in the week of 4 June 2016.

== Critical reception ==
Professional ratings
Review scores
Source	Rating
Pulse Nigeria	3.5/5 stars
notJustOk	8/10
Jaguda	4/5 stars

Upon its release, New Era was met to positive critical reviews among music critics in the local media. Arinze Obikili of Jaguda gave the album 4 stars out of 5, stating that: "New Era, ironically does well in attempting to usher in a new era of pop music in Nigeria. A new set of expectations, and a new standard....For this, we say a big Kudos to Kiss Daniel and his team". In the same vein, Tola Sarumi, a music critic and analyst for notJustOk, was full of praise on the production of the album; further stating that: "Listening to this album is a pleasure; the imageries he manages to evoke, his composure and complex melodies all serve to remind that pop music can be well considered and produced with longevity as an outcome".

Joey Akan of Pulse Nigeria gave the album 3.5 stars out of 5, stating that Daniel's strong songwriting, consistent hits, and varied vocal styles make New Era a solid and worthy debut. He concluded that 'Kiss Daniel combines substance with the pop-adored 'fineboyism' to make music which is immersive, content-filled, and worthy of a 'New Era'." Wilfred Okiche, reviewing for 360nobs, commended the album as a smooth and well-written debut, stating that New Era is "a delightful mix of breezy pop tunes crafted to fly by effortlessly", noting that only a few weaker features hold it back.

=== Accolades ===
New Era won Album of the Year and Best R&B/Pop Album at The Headies 2016. The album also won Album of the Year at the 2017 Ghana-Naija Showbiz Awards.

Year	Awards ceremony	Award description(s)	Results
2016	The Headies	Album of the Year	Won
2016	The Headies	Best R&B/Pop Album	Won
2017	Ghana-Naija Showbiz Awards	Album of the Year	Won

== Track listing ==
No.	Title	Producer(s)	Length
1.	"New King"	Beatburx	3:26
2.	"Another Day"	Beatburx	3:43
3.	"Jombo"	Masterkraft	3:11
4.	"Mama"	Young John	3:40
5.	"Gobe"	Jay Sleek	3:04
6.	"Napo" (featuring Sugarboy)	DJ Coublon	3:14
7.	"Good Time"	DJ Coublon	3:11
8.	"Give Into"	Jay Sleek	4:33
9.	"Kudi"	Jay Sleek	3:46
10.	"Ghetto Boys" (featuring Sugarboy)	Beatburx	3:56
11.	"Laye"	DJ Coublon	3:48
12.	"Are You Alright?"	DJ Coublon	2:54
13.	"Alone"	DJ Coublon	3:11
14.	"Kiss Me"	Young John	3:41
15.	"Sin City"	Masterkraft	2:47
16.	"Upon Me" (featuring Sugarboy)	Beatburx	3:11
17.	"Duro"	Kimzbeat	3:17
18.	"Woju"	DJ Coublon	3:24
19.	"All God"	Young John	2:39
20.	"Nothing Dey"	DJ Coublon	3:15

== Personnel ==
=== Musicians ===
- Sugarboy – featured artist

== Charts ==
Chart (2016)	Peak position
US World Albums (Billboard)	8

== Release history ==
Region	Date	Format	Label	Ref
Nigeria	May 14, 2016	Digital download	G-Worldwide Entertainment	
