= Mz Kiss =

- Born: Akindele Justina Omowunmi; September 1, 1996 (age 29); Okitipupa, Nigeria
- Genres: Hip Hop, afropop
- Occupations: Rapper, singer, songwriter
- Instrument: Vocals
- Years active: 2012–present

Akindele Justina Omowunmi (born September 1, 1996), known by her stage name Mz Kiss, is a Nigerian rapper, singer, and songwriter.

== Background ==
Mz Kiss was born on 1 September 1996 in Okitipupa, a town in local government area of Ondo State, Western Nigeria. She studied Mass Communication.

== Musical career ==
In 2010, Mz Kiss started her journey into music, she released her debut singles You Go Craze in 2012, Holla at Me in 2013.

She released Figure 8 on April 3, 2013, the first single after singing on to Taurus Musik and Bad Dog Entertainment which received massive reception, thereby gaining her new grounds in the industry.

In 2016, Mz Kiss was nominated for the Rookie of the Year at The Headies 2016 edition, and was nominated in the Best New Act category at the 2016 Nigeria Entertainment Awards.

On September 12, 2018, she received 1 nomination in the Trailblazer of the Year category at 2018 Nigeria Entertainment Awards.

== Discography ==
=== EP's ===
- Street on the Loose (2016)

=== Singles ===
- You Go Craze (2012)
- Holla at Me (2013)
- Figure 8 (2013)
- Holla at Me (2013)
- Spatacuz (2014)
- Owo Meta (2015)
- Stoopid featuring Falz (2015)
- Last Year (2016)
- Ikilo (2016)
- Enemy Of Progress (2016)
- Fuji (2017)
- Ijo (2017)
- Wawu (2017)
- Slow Down (2017)
- Merule (featuring Slim Case) (produced by Tiwezi) (2018)
- Gbewa (2018)
- Igara (2018)
- Braaa (2019)
- Youth Wake Up (2019)

As featured artist
Year	Title	Album
2016	"Korra Obidi" (Kilibe featuring Mz Kiss)	Non-album single
2016	"Koshi" (Dah Ray featuring Mz Kiss)	Non-album single
2016	"Ma Lo Ro" (TobyGrey featuring Mz Kiss)	Non-album single
2016	"Sade" (Stars featuring Mz Kiss)	Non-album single
2017	"I Ain't Go No Time" (Pepenazi featuring Lucy Q, Phlow & Mz Kiss)	
2017	"Number One" (Jenny.O featuring Mayorkun, Dremo & Mz Kizz)	
2017	"Give Me Your Love" (Flosha featuring Mz Kiss)	
2017	"Hustle & Pray" (Lamboginny featuring Mz Kiss)	
2018	"Define Rap" (VJ Adams featuring Ice Prince, Vector, Sound Sultan, M.I & Mz Kiss)	
2018	"O Shapranpran 2.0" (TeeBlaQ featuring Trod & Mz Kiss)	
2018	"Shempe" (DJ Xclusive featuring Slimcase & Mz Kiss)	
2018	"ShoTiwa Online" (Active Donsun featuring Mz Kiss)	
2018	"Move" (G Money featuring Mz Kiss & Small Doctor)	
2018	"O Sha Pran Pran 2.0" (TeeBlaq featuring Mz Kiss & T-Rod)	
2018	"Chase" (Stackz featuring Mz Kiss)	
2018	"Ji Masun" (DJ Faze featuring Mz Kiss & Sound Sultan)	
2019	"Jaiye" (KAJ featuring Mz Kiss)	

== Awards and recognition ==
Year	Award ceremony	Prize	Recipient/Nominated work	Result	Ref
2018	Nigeria Entertainment Awards	Trailblazer of the Year	"Herself"	Nominated	
2016	The Headies 2016	Rookie of the Year Award	"Herself"	Nominated	
2016	Nigeria Entertainment Awards	Best New Act	"Herself"	Nominated	
