= Wizpec =

- Born: Okoro Opeoluwa Michael; 18 December 1996 (age 29); Lagos, Nigeria
- Genres: Afrobeats; afro-pop; afrobeat; dancehall
- Occupations: Singer-songwriter; musician
- Years active: 2018–present
- Label: Antisocial Records–present

Okoro Opeoluwa Michael (born 18 December 1996), known professionally as Wizpec, is a Nigerian singer-songwriter and performing artist. He rose to fame with the release of his song "Olorun O Je," which garnered him a nomination at the City People Entertainment Awards for Popular Song of the Year in 2018.

Wizpec released his debut EP, Afrocentric, in 2020 and received a City People Entertainment Award Next Rated nomination that same year. His debut album, Good Things Take Time (GTTT), followed in 2021 and won a 2023 Golden Star Award.

== Early life ==
Okoro Opeoluwa Michael was born and raised on Lagos Island, Nigeria, where he lived with his mother and three brothers. He developed a passion for music early in life, performing in talent shows and community events, and recorded his first single at 16.

== Career ==
Wizpec's musical career began at an early age. He was discovered by Sound Sultan and was a backup dancer for him. His breakout single, "Olorun O Je," garnered significant attention and led to a nomination for the City People Awards' Next Rated category in 2018. In 2020, he released the EP "Afrocentric." Upon its release, he was nominated for the City People Entertainment Awards' Next Rated category in 2020.

In January 2022, AntiSocial Records announced the signing of Wizpec. In March 2023, following this, he released several singles, including "Sign" and "Riddim". Wizpec collaborated with fellow artist Boyblizz to release the joint album Good Things Take Time (GTTT), an 18-track album. Fidelia Ukaegbu of P.M. News commended Wizpec's vocal performance on GTTT. In the fourth quarter of 2023 won the Golden Star Awards for Debut Album of the Year. Wizpec also performed in Iran for his Iranian Tour in 2025, held in Tehran in April 2025.

== Discography ==
=== Studio albums ===
List of Studio Albums
Title	Album details	Year released
Good Things Take Time (GTTT)	Number of Tracks: 18; Label: Antisocial Records; Formats: Streaming, digital download	2023

=== Extended plays ===
List of EPs
Title	Music Details	Year released
Afrocentric	Number of Tracks: 4; Formats: Streaming, digital download	2020

=== Singles ===
As lead artiste
Year	Title	Album
2023	Sign	Good Things Take Time
2023	Riddim	Good Things Take Time
2022	For You	Good Things Take Time
2021	Zoom	Non-album singles
2021	Hello	Non-album singles
2017	Olorun O Je	Non-album singles

== Awards and nominations ==
Year	Event	Category	Result	Ref
2018	City People Entertainment Awards	Popular Song of the Year	Nominated	
2020	City People Entertainment Awards	City People Next Rated Artiste	Nominated	
2023	Golden Star awards	Debut album of the year	Won	
