= Reggae Blues =

2015 single by Harrysong

Single by Harrysong featuring KCee, Olamide, Iyanya and Orezi
- Released: 4 August 2015
- Recorded: 2015
- Genre: Reggae; highlife
- Length: 4:50
- Label: Five Star
- Songwriters: Harrison Okiri; Kingsley Okonkwo; Olamide Adedeji; Iyanya Mbuk; Esegine Allen
- Producer: Dr. Amir

Harrysong singles chronology
"Ma Meh" (2015)	"Reggae Blues" (2015)	"Ebaeno" (2015)

KCee singles chronology
"Love Boat" (2015)	"Reggae Blues" (2015)	"Alkayida" (2015)

Olamide singles chronology
"Lagos Boys" (2015)	"Reggae Blues" (2015)	"Matters Arising" (2015)

Iyanya singles chronology
"Baby Daddy" (2015)	"Reggae Blues" (2015)	"Type of Woman" (2016)

Orezi singles chronology
"Shuperu (Remix)" (2015)	"Reggae Blues" (2015)	"Baby Abeg" (2015)

Music video
- "Reggae Blues" on YouTube

"Reggae Blues" is a song by Nigerian singer-songwriter Harrysong. It was released on 4 August 2015, and features artists Kcee, Olamide, Iyanya and Orezi. A blend of reggae, and highlife, the song, at The Headies 2016, was nominated for Best Collaboration, and won the Best Pop Single. It won the Collaboration of the Year at the 2016 Nigeria Entertainment Awards.

== Background ==
In an interview with Showtime, Harrysong shared that the inspiration for "Reggae Blues" was him thinking of new ways to entertain his fans. According to Nigerian Entertainment Today, it took Harrysong five weeks to get all the artists together.

== Music video ==
The music video for "Reggae Blues" was released on 7 August 2015 and was directed by Adasa Cookey. It features Harrysong, along with Kcee, Olamide, Iyanya, and Orezi, performing in a bar.

== Accolades ==
Awards and nominations for "Reggae Blues"
Organization	Year	Category	Result	Ref.
The Headies 2016	2016	Best Pop Single	Won	
The Headies 2016	2016	Best Collaboration	Nominated	
The Headies 2016	2016	Song of the Year	Nominated	
tooXclusive Awards 2015	2016	Best Street-Hop Track	Nominated	
2015 Nigeria Music Video Awards	2016	Best Highlife Video	Won	
2016 Nigeria Entertainment Awards	2016	Collaboration of the Year	Nominated	
2016 City People Entertainment Awards	2016	Popular Song of the Year	Won	
2016 City People Entertainment Awards	2016	Best Collabo of the Year	Nominated	
MTV Africa Music Awards 2016	2016	Song of the Year	Nominated	
2016 Soundcity MVP Awards Festival	2016	Best Collaboration	Nominated	
COSON Song Awards 2015	2015	Most Uncommon Song	Nominated	

== Personnel ==
- Harrison Tare Okiri - vocals, writing
- Kingsley Chinweike Okonkwo - vocals, writing
- Olamide Gbenga Adedeji - vocals, writing
- Iyanya Onoyom Mbuk - vocals, writing
- Esegine Allen - vocals, writing
- Dr. Amir - production
- Zeeno Foster - mixing, mastering

== Release history ==
Release history and formats for "Reggae Blues"
Region	Date	Format	Label
Various	4 August 2015	Digital download	Five Star
