= Korra Obidi =

Nigerian singer-songwriter, dancer and author (born 1991)

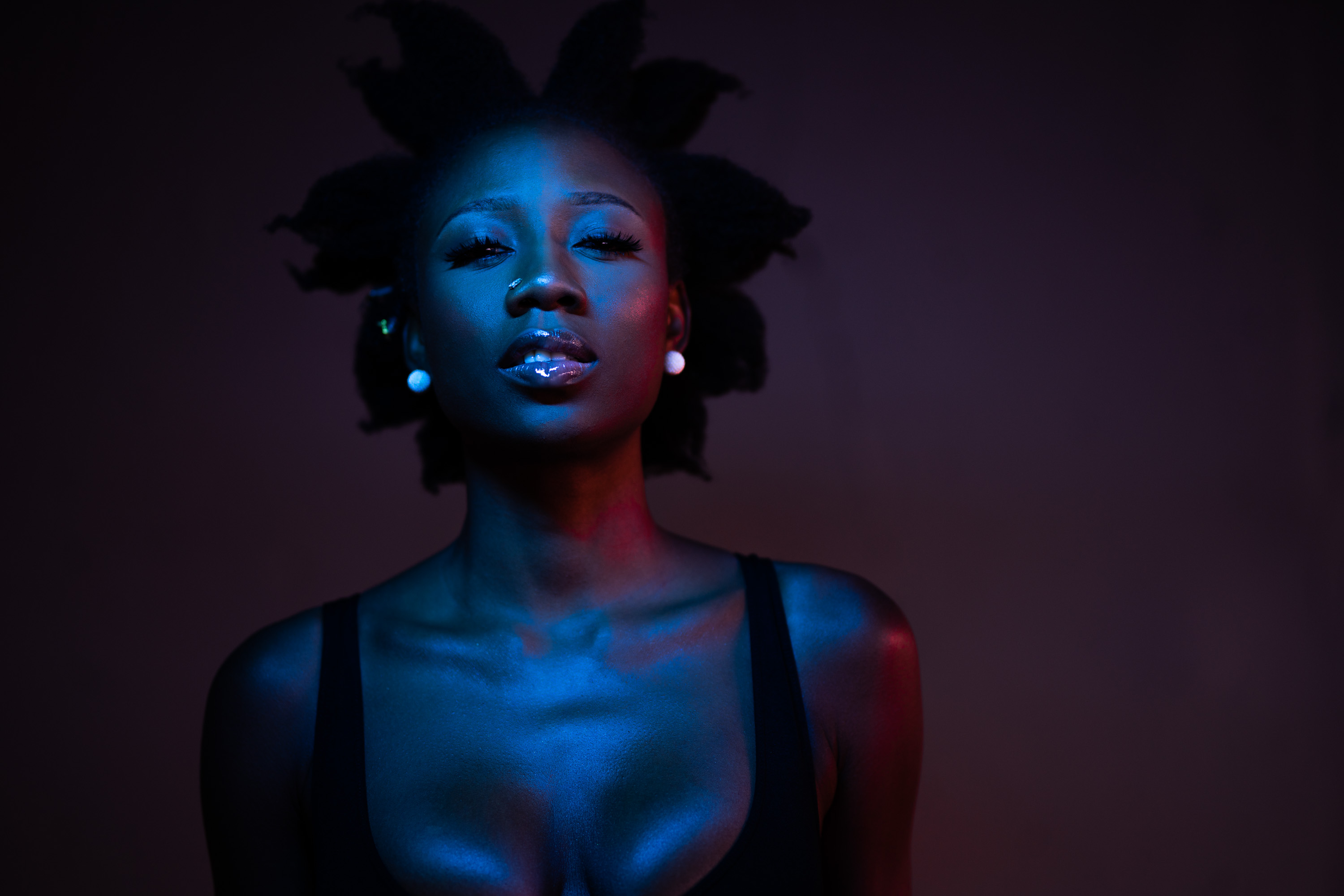
- Born: Anita Chukwumfumnaya Obidi; June 23, 1991 (age 34); Igbuzo, Delta State, Nigeria
- Education: Bachelor of Science in Business Education
- Alma mater: University of Lagos
- Occupations: Dancer; Singer-Songwriter; Model; Content Creator
- Years active: 2009–present
- Spouse: Dr. Justin Dean (div. 2022)
- Children: 2
- Parents: Anthony Obidi (father); Pauline Obidi (mother)
- Website: korraobidi.live

Anita Chukwumfumnaya Obidi //, (born 23 June 1991), known as Korra Obidi, is a Nigerian singer-songwriter, dancer and model.

== Early life and education ==
Obidi is from Igbuzo (Ibusa) in Delta State, South-South Nigeria. She was born into a family of three girls and a boy. Her mother is deceased. She was brought up in a deeply religious and conservative Christian family that attended Deeper Christian Life Ministry, which made her hide her passion for dancing from her parents while growing up.

== Career ==
=== Dance ===
She was the recipient of an AFRIMMA nomination for the Best Dancer in 2017. She performed in the Basketball Africa League 2017/2018 season. She was a contestant in the 2019 edition of the American talent show So You Think You Can Dance while heavily pregnant. She started her dance career in 2007, featuring in a song by Nigerian female rapper Sasha P.

=== Film ===
Obidi was a child star in Nigerian Nollywood movies in the late 2000s. After a hiatus, she returned in 2022 as one of the cast of the Nollywood movie, What If. The movie also starred Alexx Ekubo, Bolanle Ninalowo, Mercy Ima Macjoe and Patience Ozokwor. She also featured in TV series Another Ordinary Day; The Flatmates; Lumba Boys alongside Francis Duru; and movie Saro, the musical.

=== Modelling ===
She has walked the runway at the Port Harcourt International Fashion Week and at the GTBank Fashion Week. She also contested in the Miss Global pageant Nigeria where she was crowned Miss Congeniality. She was the vixen in the music video of American group Black Eyed Peas, titled Wings as well as of Nigerian musicians Tekno and Orezi's Whine For Daddy.

=== Music ===
Obidi released her debut single in 2015 titled Man Like You. The video was directed by Paul Gambit. She also released the song titled Kilibe featuring Mz Kiss, and then she released Vibration featuring Victoria Kimani. She released two music albums namely Woman Power Series (2016) and Sounds From The Throne Room (2019).

== Personal life ==
Obidi married Dr. Justin Dean in December 2017 and they have two children together. The couple is currently divorced. She cited her mental health as one of the reasons she quit her marriage. Her ex-husband accused her of infidelity. She is based in the United States.
