= Thaddeus Attah =

Nigerian politician

Thaddeus Attah is a Nigerian politician and member for the 10th National Assembly, House of Representatives from Eti-Osa Federal Constituency of Lagos State on the ticket of Labour Party, LP.

== Political career ==
Thaddeus, an "unknown politician" contested in the February 25, 2023 House of Representatives election for Eti-Osa Federal Constituency in the metropolitan Lagos State against the candidate of the People's Democratic Party, PDP, Banky W (Olubankole Wellington) a well-known and an award-winning musical artist and the candidate of All Progressives Congress, APC, Babajide Obanikoro, the incumbent member of the Federal House of Reps running for a return ticket to the House. Obanikoro is son of Musiliu Obanikoro a well-known politician in Lagos State who was a Senator and Minister of State for Defence. Thaddeus' campaign was largely unnoticed, and he was lowly rated to win election against these opponents.

In the general election of 25 February, Thaddeus sprung a surprise by polling majority votes of 24,075 to defeat Banky W of the PDP who scored 18,666 to place second while the candidate of the ruling APC and the incumbent Reps member, Babajide Obanikoro scored 16,901 to place third. Hours following the declaration of Thaddeus as the winner, Banky W commented that he expected to win the election and had already planned a church thanksgiving service for the following morning after election and was also searching for a private office space and residential accommodation in Abuja ahead of his inauguration to the House if he had won. Thaddeus' win over these two opponents was one of major political upsets in the 2023 general election caused by the "effect of Peter Obi" the presidential candidate of LP.
