= Yes/No (Banky W. song) =

Single by Banky W

from the album R&BW
- Released: 19 November 2012
- Recorded: 2012
- Genre: R&B
- Length: 4:07
- Label: Empire Mates Entertainment
- Songwriter: Banky W
- Producer: Cobhams Asuquo

Banky W singles chronology
"Get Down Tonight" (2012)	"Yes/No" (2012)	"Good Good Loving" (2012)

Music video
- "Yes/No" on YouTube

"Yes/No" is a song by Nigerian singer Banky W, released as the lead single from his fifth studio album, R&BW (2013). The song was produced by Cobhams Asuquo and peaked at number one on BBC Radio 1Xtra's Afrobeat chart.

== Music video ==
The accompanying music video for "Yes/No" was filmed in Lagos by Banky W and Clarence Peters. British-Nigerian model Angela Tokunbo Daniel played Banky W's love interest in the video.

== Accolades ==
The music video for "Yes/No" won Most Gifted R&B Video at the 10th Annual Channel O Music Video Awards, which was held at the Walter Sisulu Square in Kliptown, Soweto on November 30, 2013. "Yes/No" earned Banky W a nomination in the Best Male Vocal Performance category at The Headies 2013.

== Release history ==
Country	Date	Format	Label
Nigeria	19 November 2012	Digital download	Empire Mates Entertainment
