= Lamboginny =

- Born: Yinka Lawanson; 22 December 1984 (age 41); Lagos State, Nigeria
- Other name: Lamb
- Occupations: Singer-songwriter; Motivational speaker; Humanitarian
- Spouse: Taccara Rae (m. 2018)
- Awards: Silver Creator Award
- Musical career
- Genres: Afrobeats; Dancehall; EDM
- Instrument: Vocals
- Years active: 1999–present
- Labels: Lamboginny Music (current); Sax Records (former)
- Website: lamboginny.org

Yinka Lawanson, known by his stage name Lamboginny, is a Nigerian Afro-Dancehall musician, youtuber, and humanitarian. Lamboginny is the co-convener of Say No To Crime movement and the advocate of S.A.L.T (Saving All Lives Together), a prison reform program in-line with the 2030 Agenda of the Sustainable Development Goals by United Nation in September 2015.

In 2002, he finished fourth place at StarQuest, a Nigerian reality competition by Nigerian Breweries. He is one half of the tiktok duo Ling and Lamb with his wife Taccara Rae (aka Ling). On 27 July 2021, they premiered the first episode of Keep it Reel with Ling and Lamb on Apple Podcasts, with Taccara Rae. In May 2021, the duo received their first YouTube Plaques for 100k subscribers.

== Music career ==
In 2017, he released his debut album SALT (an acronym for Saving All Lives Together) on 27 October 2017. SALT featured guest appearances from DJ Jimmy Jatt, Korede Bello, Olamide, Muna, P-Square, Mike Aremu, and Small Doctor. On 12 October 2017, following the release of SALT, he launched the album with a concert at Kirikiri Maximum Security Prison in Lagos. He was introduced on stage by Do2tun with guest performances from DJ Jimmy Jatt, Small Doctor, Mz Kiss, Ozzybosco, and Muna. On 26 January 2017, he appeared in attendance and performed at LoudNProud 6th Anniversary Party, alongside Shina Peller, Dammy Krane, PSquare, and MAKA.

In 2014, COPA Lagos theme song was released and performed by Lamboginny at the 2014 edition of COPA Lagos beach ball tournament, which hold from 12 to 14 December 2014 at the Eko Atlantic City. In 2020, he appeared on the playlist of "Hip Hop 4 Peace", a livestreaming broadcast curated by Universal Hip Hop Museum to celebrate the 75th anniversary of the International Day of Peace on YouTube, on 21 September 2020.

On 5 March 2021, he released "Move", a record produced by Benie Macaulay. On 19 March 2021, the music video was released and directed by Kaykay Sublime. On 16 June 2021, he released "Sak Pase", a record produced by Benie Macaulay. On 2 July 2021, he released "Sak Pase remix", featuring Tony Mix. On 6 July 2021, the music video was released and directed by Director Ray.

On 10 September 2021, he released his second debut album "Food Is Ready", through Lamboginny Music, featuring DAP The Contract, Ling, and Tony Mix. The album lead singles "Move", "Highest Vibration", and "Sak Pase (Remix)" featuring TonyMix. In August 2022, he released "Mama" on all streaming platforms, a song dedicated to his mother and all mothers around the world.

=== Recording deal ===
In 2012, he signed a recording deal with Sax Records, an entertainment company founded by Yemi Sax.

== Humanitarian work ==
Reforming prisons is about leaving no one behind

— Lambo speaking to the United Nations

In 2009, he founded the Say No To Crime Project and had his first anti-crime campaign concert in Kirikiri Maximum Security Prison in Lagos, which caught the attention of the former Controller General of Nigerian Prisons Service, Olushola Ogundipe. Following his meeting with him in 2010, Lamboginny was made the anti-crime ambassador of Nigerian Prisons Service. On 6 December 2010, he was appointed an Officer to the Nigerian Prisons Service. On 7 January 2011, he started the female prison concert project, which he titled Season in Prison. With performance from Onyeka Onwenu, Shan George, Stella Damasus, Chidinma, Aydotcom, Sexy Steel, Dekunle Fuji, Jedi, DJ Rowland and Jafextra. On 14 February 2011, he had a VIP "Valentine in Prison" Concert. With guess appearance from Midnight Crew, Denrele Edun, Tim Godfrey, AK1, Dele Momodu, Stella Damasus and Shan George. On 11 December 2012, he was appointed the ambassadors of National Drug Law Enforcement Agency.

In 2016, the 44th president of the United States, Barack Obama's invited him to speak at the Young African Leaders Initiative. In 2017, he was invited to speak at Leicester Prison, in the United Kingdom. In 2019, he spoke about the 40 thousand prison inmates, awaiting trial at the Kirikiri Maximum Security Prison at the 68th United Nations Civil Society Conference. In 2020, he visited, Cheltenham Youth Facility, Alfred D. Noyes Children's Center, and Montgomery County Correctional Facility, where he performed and spoke to the inmates.

In 2018, he founded SALT, a nonprofit organisation for fund raising, prisons reform and music therapy program in Nigeria. In 2019, he was assigned, Ariel Foundation International’s representative at United Nations. Same year, he shares his ideas on battling the climate crisis with Insider Inc., alongside Greta Thunberg, and Helena Gualinga.

== Honour ==
On 1 February 2021, he was nominated by his wife Taccara Rae on Good Morning America for the inspiration list on who's making Black history in 2021, for his work on bringing freedom to over 120 wrongfully imprisoned men in Nigeria, and for incorporating music therapy concerts in various prisons in Africa, the United Kingdom and the United States.

== Personal life ==
Yinka was born in 1984, in Lagos, Nigeria. He was engaged to Taccara Rae on 17 November 2017, and got married on 5 January 2018.

== Discography ==
=== Albums ===
List of studio albums with selected details
Title	Album details
Salt	Released: 28 September 2017; Label: Lamboginny Music; Formats: Digital download, streaming
Food Is Ready	Released: 10 September 2021; Label: Lamboginny Music; Formats: Digital download, streaming

== Awards and nominations ==
Year	Awards ceremony	Award description(s)	Recipient	Results
2016	Nigeria Music Video Awards	Best Use Of Costume "I am a Winner (featuring. Chidinma)"	Himself & Mr Clayy	Won
