= Clifford Orji =

Nigerian man accused of murder and cannibalism

Clifford Orji after his arrest, paraded by the police with a corpse and over a dozen human skulls discovered at his home

Clifford Nwa Orji (1965 or 1966 – August 17, 2012) was a Nigerian man, who was a cannibal. He was also indicted for serial killings, kidnappings, and the sale of human body parts. Orji was arrested in 1999 and died in Nigeria's only super-maximum security prison, where he spent 13 years without trial.

== Biography ==
He was initially a razor-blade merchant but later proclaimed himself a shaman, a "native doctor Chinneyelu". He lived under a highway bridge in Oshodi-Isolo, reportedly pretending to be mentally ill.

== Arrest and confession ==
Orji was arrested on February 3, 1999, after a missing woman was discovered near death at his home under the bridge. Fresh and cooked human body parts and human skulls were also discovered. He was arraigned at a Magistrate court in Ebute-Meta. After his arrest, a thorough search of his hideout was made, which also revealed female underwear, a cheque for ₦80,000, and a mobile phone, at a time when the G.S.M. had not been fully introduced to the Nigerian market, so only wealthy people had mobile phones. A man accused of being his accomplice in trading human body parts was also arrested.

At a news conference organized by the police, Orji confessed to kidnapping, murder and cannibalism, saying that he and his accomplice "[had] been eating human meat for the past seven years before coming to Lagos. It is our culture to eat human meat." On December 7, 2000, he was remanded for murder in Kirikiri Prison, which is Nigeria's only supermax prison.

== Death ==
In April 2012, after approximately 12 years in prison without his case coming to trial, Orji sued the Attorney-General of Lagos State, Ade Ipaye, for unlawful imprisonment. Prison authorities stated that they had been unable to have him treated for mental illness, which had progressed and he could not be tried when insane. He died at the age of 46 on August 17, 2012. An autopsy established that his death was from natural causes.
