= MOBO Awards 2017 =

2017 edition of award ceremony

- Awarded for: Excellence in music of black origin
- Date: 29 November 2017
- Location: First Direct Arena, Leeds, England
- Country: United Kingdom
- Hosted by: Maya Jama; Marvin Humes

Highlights
- Most wins: Stormzy (3 wins)
- Most nominations: Stormzy (6 nominations)
- Album of the Year: Stormzy – Gang Signs & Prayer
- Website: mobo.com

Television/radio coverage
- Network: Channel 5 (deferred); BET (highlights)

The MOBO Awards 2017 ceremony was held at First Direct Arena in Leeds on 29 November 2017 and hosted by English television presenters Maya Jama and Marvin Humes; it was broadcast on Channel 5, highlights were shown on BET.

Nominees were announced on 17 October 2017, with Stormzy leading the field with six nominations. Across 15 award categories, Stormzy was the night's biggest winner, taking home three awards.

== Performers ==
The following artists performed at the ceremony.

List of performers at the MOBO Awards 2017
Artist(s)
Cardi B
Davido
Krept & Konan
Stormzy
Stefflon Don
Ray BLK
Not3s
Yungen & Yxng Bane
Tokio Myers
B Positive Choir

== Winners and nominees ==
Winners appear first and highlighted in bold.

| **Best Album**: **Gang Signs & Prayer – Stormzy**; Common Sense – J Hus; One Foot Out – Nines; Process – Sampha; Growing Over Life – Wretch 32 | **Best Song**: **"Did You See" – J Hus**; "Dun Talkin'" – Kojo Funds feat. Abra Cadabra; "Addison Lee" – Not3s; "Big for Your Boots" – Stormzy; "Bestie" – Yungen feat. Yxng Bane |
| **Best Newcomer**: **Dave**; Jorja Smith; Kojo Funds; Lotto Boyzz; Loyle Carner; Mabel; Mist; Not3s; Stefflon Don; Yxng Bane | **Best Video**: **"Hot Property" – Mist (Directed by Oliver Jennings)**; "Walk The Walk" – Bossman Birdie (Directed by Luke Davies); "Spirit" – J Hus (Directed by Hugo Jenkins); "The Isle Of Arran" – Loyle Carner (Directed by Georgia Hudson); "Big for Your Boots" – Stormzy (Directed by Daps) |
| **Best Female Act**: **Stefflon Don**; Emeli Sandé; Jessie Ware; Jorja Smith; Lady Leshurr; Little Simz; Mabel; Nadia Rose; NAO; Ray BLK | **Best Male Act**: **Stormzy**; Bugzy Malone; Chip; Dave; Giggs; J Hus; Maleek Berry; Mostack; Sampha; Skepta |
| **Best Grime Act**: **Stormzy**; AJ Tracey; Chip; P Money; Skepta; Wiley | **Best R&B/Soul Act**: **Craig David**; Jorja Smith; NAO; Ray BLK; Sampha |
| **Best Hip Hop Act**: **Giggs**; Little Simz; Loyle Carner; Nines; Stefflon Don; Wretch 32 | **Best International Act**: **Wizkid**; Cardi B; DJ Khaled; Drake; Jay-Z; Kendrick Lamar; Migos; Solange Knowles; SZA; Travis Scott |
| **Best Gospel Act**: **Volney Morgan & New-Ye**; Lurine Cato; Mali Music; S.O.; Triple O | **Best Jazz Act**: **Moses Boyd**; Cleveland Watkiss; Daymé Arocena; Mr Jukes; Terrace Martin |
| **Best African Act**: **Davido**; Eugy; Juls; Maleek Berry; Mr Eazi; Sarkodie; Tekno; Tiwa Savage; Wande Coal; Wizkid | **Best Reggae Act**: **Damian Marley**; Aidonia; Alkaline; Chronixx; Popcaan |
**Paving the Way** **Idris Elba**
