= Humblesmith =

Nigerian musician

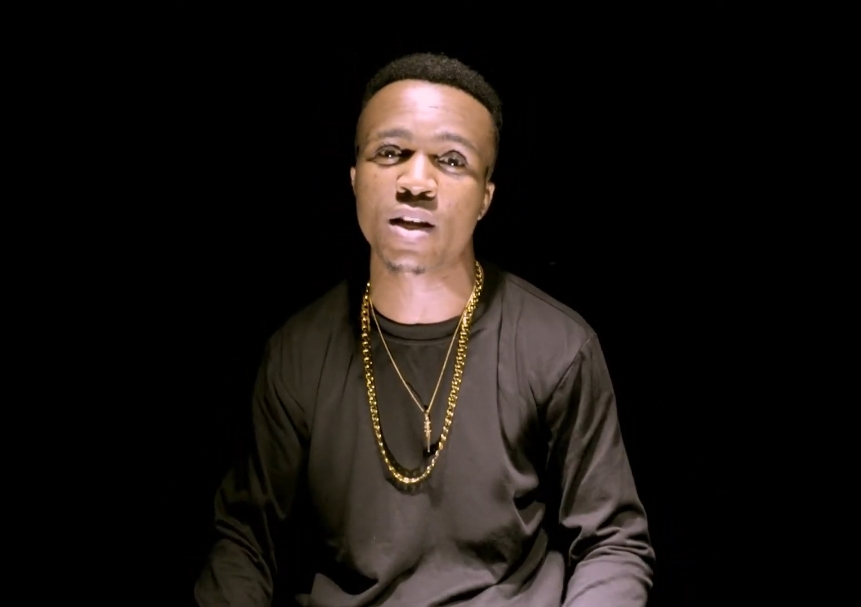

Background information
- Born: Ekenedirichukwu Ijemba; May 14, 1991 (age 35); Abakaliki, Ebonyi State, Nigeria
- Origin: Imo State, Nigeria
- Genres: R&B, afropop, highlife
- Occupations: singer-songwriter, vocalist
- Instrument: Vocals
- Years active: 2011–present
- Label: Show Bobo Music

Ekenedirichukwu Ijemba (born May 14, 1991), better known by his stage name Humblesmith, is a Nigerian afropop recording artist who achieved recognition upon the release of his hit single titled "Osinachi" in 2015 which later won a nomination spot at the 2016 Nigeria Entertainment Awards. He first ventured into the entertainment business as an actor, starring in a number of films including Hypertension (2010) with Sam Loco Efe. Currently signed to Show Bobo Music Limited, he made the list of "10 Artists To Watch in 2016" by notJustOk.

== Early life ==
Originally from Uruala, a town in Ideato North local government area of Imo State, southeastern Nigeria, Ekene Ijemba was born on May 14, 1991, into a Catholic family in Abakaliki, Ebonyi State, Nigeria. While in secondary school, he started dancing and was part of a group called American Boys before he left Ebonyi State for Asaba City, the capital of Delta State, South-Southern Nigeria in order to pursue a career in music.

== Career ==
=== 2014–2017: Beginnings and rise to fame ===
Upon arriving in Asaba City, Humblesmith had to take up menial jobs in order to earn a living. He later ventured into entertainment as an actor and appeared in various films including Hypertension with Sam Loco Efe. He returned to Ebonyi State at some point and then back to Delta State again to focus on a career in music. Determined to succeed, he started scouting for shows and performed for free until he was signed by DG Records who were impressed with one of his several performances. In 2012, he left Asaba City for Lagos State where he recorded his debut single "Chairmoo" in 2014. In 2015, he released "Osinachi, a chart-topping single that featured Phyno; and Davido in the remix version. The song earned him a nomination spot in the "Best New Act" category at the 2016 edition of the Nigeria Entertainment Awards and was also nominated in the "Hottest Single" category at the same event. In April 2016, he featured Flavour N'abania in a song titled "Jukwese" which enjoyed rotational airplay around the country. He later announced an Instagram competition tagged the "#JukweseContest" in reference to the song, with a $2,000 prize money for the winner.

=== 2018–present: Release of Osinachi, hiatus, and other singles ===
Following the success of his singles "Osinachi" and Jukwuese", Humblesmith released his debut album Osinachi, which featured guest vocals from Davido, Patoranking, Phyno, Harrysong, Olamide, and Tiwa Savage. In December 2020, after a brief hiatus, he released a new single, Kosi, loosely translated as "God's will", a song of gratitude to God for his achievements.

=== Artistry ===
Humblesmith cites Bright Chimezie as his music influence. He usually sings the afropop genre of music with a little fusion of highlife.

=== Endorsement deal ===
In June 2016, Humblesmith signed an endorsement deal with noodles manufacturing company Tummy-Tummy Food Industry.

== Selected discography ==
Year	Song	Album
2014	"Chairmoo"	Non-album singles
2014	"Bogati"	Non-album singles
2014	"Shoki"	Non-album singles
2015	"Love Me"	Non-album singles
2015	"Osinachi" (featuring Phyno)	Non-album singles
2016	"Osinachi (Remix)" (featuring Davido)	Non-album singles
2016	"Jukwese" (featuring Flavour N'abania)	Non-album singles
2016	"Na U" (featuring Harrysong)	Non-album singles
2017	"Attracta"	Non-album singles
2017	"Focus"	Non-album singles
2017	"Abakaliki to Lasgidi (featuring Olamide)	Non-album singles
2017	"Sugar"	Non-album singles
2019	"Uju Mina"	Non-album singles
2019	"Report My Case"	Non-album singles
2020	"Kosi"	Non-album singles
2021	"Dance"	Non-album singles
2022	"Omalicha"	Non-album singles
2022	"Born Champion"	Non-album singles
2022	"Ogaba"	Non-album singles
2023	"Jidenna"	Non-album singles
2023	"With My Love"	Non-album singles
2024	"Twis & Wain"	Non-album singles
2024	"Mmadu"	Non-album singles
2024	"Sochi"	Non-album singles

== Awards and nominations ==
Year	Award ceremony	Prize	Recipient/Nominated work	Result	Ref
2016	The Headies 2015	Rookie of The Year	Himself	Nominated	
2016	2016 Nigeria Entertainment Awards	Hottest Single	"Osinachi"	Nominated	
2016	2016 Nigeria Entertainment Awards	Best New Act	Himself	Nominated	
2016	2016 African Muzik Magazine Awards	Best Newcomer	Himself	Nominated	
2016	2016 City People Entertainment Awards	Collaboration of the Year	"Osinachi (Remix)"	Won	
2016	The Headies 2016	Song of the Year	"Osinachi (Remix)"	Nominated	
2016	The Headies 2016	Best Pop Single	"Osinachi (Remix)"	Nominated	
2016	The Headies 2016	Best Collaboration	"Osinachi (Remix)"	Nominated	
2016	The Headies 2016	Next Rated	Himself	Nominated	
2016	Nigerian Teen Choice Award 2016	Choice Afro Beat & Pop Artist	Himself	Nominated	
2016	Nigerian Teen Choice Award 2016	Choice New Song of the Year	"Osinachi (Remix)"	Nominated	

== See also ==
- List of Nigerian musicians
