= GoldMyne TV =

Nigerian television channel

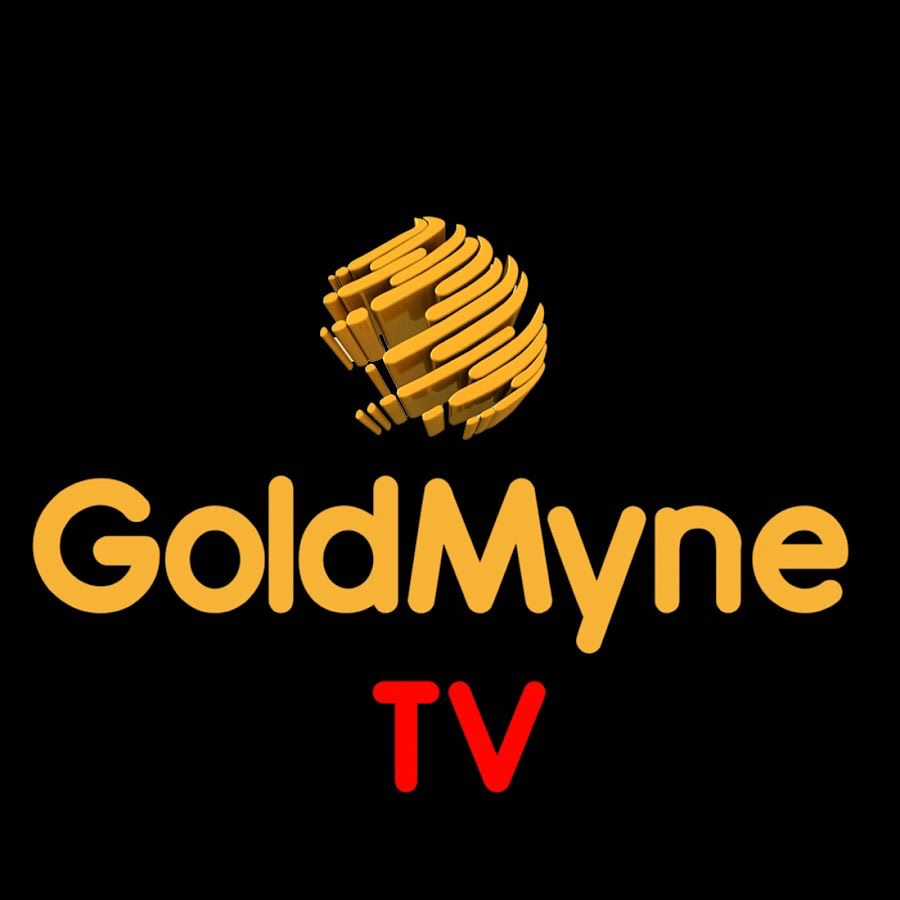
- Owner: Otunba Sesan Rufai
- Launched: 1 April 2006
- Current status: Active

GoldMyne TV is a Nigerian company which produces television and radio programs, including news, music and entertainment, which is broadcast online.

GoldMyne TV is a recipient of the City people music award for online TV of the year for 2016, 2018 and 2019.

== History ==
GoldMyne TV was launched in 2006 and is owned by Otunba Sesan Rufai. It encapsulates all aspects of entertainment. GoldMyne TV has its network stretched into Content Production on TV, Radio and online. They have a total of 449,000 subscribers on YouTube, 2 million followers on Intsagram and 61,000 followers on X(formerly twitter) as at June 2024.

Over the years GoldMyne TV has held many interview sessions some of which features the likes of Nedu, Reekado Banks, Ahmed Musa etc.

== Television programs ==
=== Hitz ===
This is a society, lifestyle magazine TV show. It is shown on Silverbird, Galaxy TV and on AIT Network.

=== Videowheels ===
This is a music oriented TV show, targeted at young persons. .It is shown on Wap TV.

=== Playground ===
Playground is a program centered on Nollywood and African film as an entirety. It is shown on WAP TV.

== Awards and nominations ==
Award	Year	Category	Result	Ref.
City People Music Awards	2016	Online TV of the year	Won	
City People Music Awards	2017	Online TV of the year	Nominated	
City People Music Awards	2018	Online TV of the year	Won	
City People Music Awards	2019	Online TV of the year	Won	
