= 123 (Nikki Laoye song) =

Single by Nikki Laoye

from the album The 123 Project (Deluxe Edition)
- Released: July 6, 2012
- Genre: Dance-pop
- Length: 3:05
- Label: Wahala Media Entertainment
- Songwriter: Nikki Laoye
- Producer: Xblaze

Nikki Laoye singles chronology
"No Be Beans" (2011)	"123" (2012)	"Only You" (2013)

Music video
- "123" on YouTube

"123" is a song recorded by Nigerian singer Nikki Laoye for her second studio album The 123 Project (2014). The song was released on July 6, 2012 by Wahala Media Entertainment as the lead single from the album on the platform of the new African music distribution application Spinlet. It was written by Nikki Laoye and produced by her brother Ade "Xblaze" Laoye.

== Background ==
In the summer of 2012, Laoye began working on her sophomore album; she had taken a brief hiatus from music following the loss of her father in 2011. Laoye teamed up with her younger brother and producer Xblaze, who had produced her earlier hits "Taka Sufe" and "No Be Beans"; to produce the single "123", which was to be the lead single to her sophomore studio album.

=== Composition ===
"123" is a pop and dance song with elements of Indian drums and thumping bass patterns. In the song Laoye switches from singing in English, to pidgin and yoruba languages. The song's chorus comprises an "oya 1-2-3" vocal hook laced in Laoye's signature harmonies. Lyrically, Laoye sings about letting loose and praising God with a dance.

== Critical reception ==
The song received generally positive reviews from most music critics. Demola Ogundele of Notjustok.com described "123" as having a "dance feel that you can move to". Priscilla Olubunmi-Awoseyi of PraiseWorld Radio said 123 "makes the aged nod their heads in rhythm" and "kids wriggle their bodies" she also added that "you just can't sit still when you hear this song".

== Commercial performance ==
123 peaked at number 7 on the Spinlet Top 10 Best Selling singles of 2013.

== Music video ==
The music video for "123" was shot on 9 March 2014, at the University of Lagos in Lagos, Nigeria. The video was directed by Anthony Akinwunmi Richards aka Tfrizzle for Frizzle and Bizzle Films and filmed on the grounds of the University, predominantly in front of the school library and by the waterfront. On 9 April 2014, Laoye released exclusive behind the scenes photographs from the video shoot, in order to create anticipation towards the release of the video on 11 April 2014.

The video, shot outdoors, depicts Nikki singing and performing energetic choreography alongside Nigerian dance group Alien Nation. It also features a dance battle between Nikki and Steven of Imagneto Dance Company and cameos from several Nigerian entertainers including Kiki Omeili, Essence, J'odie, Ade Laoye, DJ Gosporella, Onos, Anny Ibrahim and Provabs.

== Live performances ==
Laoye's first major performance of 123 was at the 2013 Crystal Awards event in Lagos. Her performance alongside Alien Nation dance group was tagged as one of the best performances of the night.

Laoye also performed to rave reviews at the Soul Sisters Concert headlined by Mary J. Blige as well as the Mandela Tribute Concert organized by EbonyLife TV in December, 2013.

In December 2014, Laoye performed "123" as a medley at the 2014 Rhythm Unplugged Event, which held at the Eko Hotels and Towers in Lagos, Nigeria. She also performed the song at The Headies 2014 Awards, as she opened the event show alongside the Alien Nation dance group.

== Charts ==
Year	Chart	Peak
2013	Spinlet Top 10 Best-Selling Singles	7
2014	Top Ten Naija Charts	9
2014	Yadamag Top 50 Popular Music Videos	14
2014	Nigezie Top Ten Countdown	2
2016	iTunes Top 100 in Uganda	1

== Recognition and awards ==
Year	Nominee / work	Award	Result
2013	'123'	Crystal Gospel Awards: Song of the Year	Nominated
2013	'123'	Nigerian Gospel Music Awards: Song of the Year	Won
2015	"123"	Crystal Gospel Awards: Video of the Year	Nominated
