= Only You (Nikki Laoye song) =

Single by Nikki Laoye

from the album The 123 Project (Deluxe Edition): God, Love...Life
- Released: April 12, 2013
- Genre: Soul; Alternative Rock
- Length: 5:48
- Label: Wahala Media Entertainment
- Songwriters: Nikki Laoye; Nelson Ekperi

Nikki Laoye singles chronology
| "123" (2012) | "Only You" (2013) | "Cant Hold me Down" (2014) |

"Only You" is a song recorded by Nigerian singer Nikki Laoye for her second studio album The 123 Project (2014). The song was released on April 12, 2013, by Wahala Media Entertainment. It was written by Nikki Laoye and Nelson Ekperi, and produced by Rotimi Keys. Only You is set across dramatic guitar strings and soulful piano melody, where Laoye gives an ode to the love of a father. The song, which Laoye dedicated to the memory of her father received generally positive reviews from critics and went on to win her the 2013 Headies Awards for Best Female Vocal Performance and the African Union backed All Africa Music Awards in 2014 for Best Female Artiste in African Inspirational Music. In May 2016, Laoye released a reggae infused remix to the song, featuring Nigerian pop singer Seyi Shay.

== Background ==
In an April 12, 2013 press release upon the release of the song, Nikki Laoye stated "Losing my father and watching him slip away in my arms, 3 months to my wedding, was the most traumatic experience of my life. He was my Hero, my best friend…Everything I had ever believed in was challenged and nothing seemed to make sense anymore. I was shattered beyond a million pieces and no one could totally understand the pain i was going through as I quietly slipped away into my own world of anger and depression, refusing to be consoled. But there He was…the ONE, who held on tightly to my mind, who refused to let me go even when I turned away in grief & despair; the ONE who kept whispering words of love, joy and peace to my heart every second over the past 1 year. The ONE who came swooshing down to rescue me & held my hand through it all... Yes, "ONLY YOU" celebrates my true Super Hero of all times, Jesus – the ONE who always gives beauty for ashes and I just simply wanna say It's been ONLY YOU, No one else But You."

=== Composition ===
"Only You" is a soulful alternative rock ballad marked by very strong vocal delivery, enchanting harmonies and emotive guitar strums. Nikki Laoye starts off singing in English and switches to Yoruba and Igbo languages seamlessly.

== Critical reception ==
Ose Binitie of EmphaticDynamo.com praised Nikki Laoye's display of "vocal prowess" on the song, summarizing that "Only You is THAT song that gets you started in the morning and helps you unwind late at night." The Clean Vibes website also described the song as being "laced with strong vocals and instrumentals and it is capable of making you Love again."

== Music video ==
The video for "Only You" was shot on location in London, England and features Nikki Laoye making a home video recording, while penning a letter to a loved one who is never seen throughout the video, as she shows her love in an emotional and at times whimsical manner. The video was released on November 22, 2013 and in the release notes, Laoye stated of the concept of the video that "This is my love note to the Lover of my soul- the one who kisses away my tears, the one who holds me tight late in the midnight hour; the one who has put my broken heart together again."

The video was directed by UK-based music producer and video director Shabach. Speaking about her experience shooting the video, Nikki Laoye further stated that "Shooting this video was very emotional for me...I had to get past being upset, and actually sing the song, not cry through it. My Dad was a true representation of who God is to me, so I literally looked into the camera and saw Him smiling back at me, urging me on. I know this song has been a great inspiration and solace to many since its release and I simply want anyone hurting out there to find comfort and rest in the soothing love of the one true Abba Father"

== Live performances ==
Nikki Laoye's first major live performance of "Only You" was at the Mary J. Blige headlined Soul Sisters Concert in October 2013 at Eko Hotels in Lagos, Nigeria. Laoye has also performed the song on national television, performing the song on Easter Monday on Nigerian Cable television station TV Continental's flagship morning programme "Your View".

== Track listing ==
Digital download
1. "Only You" – 5:48

The 123 Project (deluxe album)
8. "Only You" - 5:48

== Recognition and awards ==
| Year | Nominee / work | Award | Result |
|---|---|---|---|
| 2013 | 'Only You' | Nigerian Gospel Music Awards: Worship Song of the Year | Nominated |
| 2013 | 'Only You' | African Gospel Music Awards, UK: Song of the Year | Nominated |
| 2013 | 'Only You' | Gospel Music Awards, Italy: Best International Song of the Year | Nominated |
| 2013 | 'Only You' | The Headies 2013: Best Vocal Performance (Female) | Won |
| 2014 | 'Only You' | Crystal Gospel Awards: Best Worship Song | Won |
| 2014 | 'Only You' | Nigerian Music Video Awards (NMVA) 2014: Best Soft Rock/Alternative Video | Won |
| 2014 | 'Only You' | All Africa Music Awards (AFRIMA) 2014: Best Female Artiste in African Inspirational Music | Won |
