= Songs About U =

Studio album by Banky W.
- Released: 1 June 2017
- Genre: R&B
- Length: 41:51
- Label: Empire Mates
- Producers: Cobhams Asuquo; Nonso Amadi; Maleek Berry; Chris Cubeta; TK; Masterkraft

Banky W. chronology
R&BW (2013)	Songs About U (2017)	The Bank Statements (2021)

Singles from Songs About U
- 1. "All for You" Released: 27 March 2014; 2. "High Notes" Released: 5 August 2015; 3. "All I Want is You" Released: 2 December 2015; 4. "Made for You" Released: 10 February 2016; 5. "Kololo (I Still Love U)" Released: 16 March 2017; 6. "Heaven (Susu's Song)" Released: 26 May 2017; 7. "Love U Baby" Released: 26 May 2017

Songs About U is the fifth studio album by Nigerian singer Banky W. It was released on 1 June 2017, through Empire Mates Entertainment. Dedicated to his wife, Adesua "Susu" Etomi, the album features guest appearances from Chidinma, Nonso Amadi, and Maleek Berry. Production was handled by Cobhams Asuquo, Nonso Amadi, Maleek Berry, Chris Cubeta, TK, and Masterkraft. It serves as a follow-up to R&BW (2013). Every track, except "High Notes", contains the letter U in the name.

== Background ==
Songs About U was first announced in a 2016 interview with HipTV, where he revealed that the name would be either Songs About You or Songs About You and Me.

== Singles ==
The album's lead single "All for You" features vocals and production from Maleek Berry. It was released on 27 March 2014 to coincide with Bay W.'s birthday. "High Notes" was released on 5 August 2015, as the album's second single. The song was produced by Cobhams Asuquo and written and co-produced by Banky himself. The accompanying music video for "High Notes" was directed by Banky W and features cameo appearances from Stephanie Coker, Praiz, Lynxxx, Shaydee, Iceberg Slim, and Iyanya. It was nominated for Best R&B Video at the 2015 Nigerian Music Video Awards. The third single off the album, "All I Want is You", features Chidinma and was released on 2 December 2015. It was produced by TK. The fourth single, "Made for You", was released on 10 February 2016. The R&B and reggae-infused song was produced by Masterkraft.

The fifth single off the album "Kololo (I Still Love U)" was released on 16 March 2017. Also produced by Masterkraft, the song was mixed and mastered by Suka Sounds. The sixth and seventh singles, "Heaven (Susu's Song)" and "Love U Baby" were released simultaneously on 26 May 2017. "Heaven (Susu's Song)" was produced by Chris Cubeta while "Love U Baby" was produced by Cobhams Asuquo. "Heaven (Susu's Song)" was nominated for Best Recording of the Year at the Headies 2018, while "Love U Baby" was nominated for Best R&B Single and Best Vocal Performance (Male) at the Headies 2018.

== Critical reception ==
Professional ratings
Review scores
Source	Rating
Pulse Nigeria	4/5 stars
FilterFree Nigeria	60%

Songs About U received mixed reception from critics. Jonathan Akan of Pulse Nigeria describing it as "impeccable music" that "will resonate deeply amongst Banky's core fans" and praised its diverse genre range, while also critiquing it for sounding "tired" and "old". Despite this, he awarded the album a rating of 4/5.

In a review for Music in Africa, Oris Aigbokhaevbolo criticized the EP for relying on previously released material, calling it "uninspired" and adding that it "should have been an EP." Chiagoziem Onyekwena, writing for Guardian Life called Songs About U "single-minded and simplistic" and said that "you can be disappointed in the Songs About U album and still be happy for the love affair that inspired it." Also reviewing for Filter Free, Onyekwena found Songs About U to be "rich in romance and sentiment" but "distinctly average in quality", awarding it a rating of 60%.

== Track listing ==
Songs About U track listing
No.	Title	Writer(s)	Producer(s)	Length
1.	"Whatchu Doing Tonight"	Olubankole Wellington	TK	4:19
2.	"Running After U" (featuring Nonso Amadi)	Wellington	Nonso Amadi	4:23
3.	"Kololo (I Still Love U)"	Wellington; Cobhams Asuquo	Masterkraft	3:52
4.	"All I Want is U" (featuring Chidinma)	Wellington; Chidinma Ekile	TK	3:40
5.	"Love U Baby"	Wellington	Cobhams Asuquo	4:55
6.	"Heaven (Susu's Song)"	Wellington	Chris Cubeta	4:43
7.	"Better for U"	Wellington	Masterkraft	4:23
8.	"Made for U"	Wellington; Asuquo	Masterkraft	4:09
9.	"All for U" (featuring Maleek Berry)	Wellington; Maleek Shoyebi	Maleek Berry	3:21

Bonus tracks
No.	Title	Writer(s)	Producer(s)	Length
10.	"High Notes"	Wellington; Eniola Akinbo	Cobhams Asuquo	4:02
Total length:				41:51

Notes

- The tracks "Kololo (I Still Love U)", "All I Want is U", "Heaven (Susu's Song)", "Made for U", and "All for U" were retitled to fit the theme of the album. The original titles are "Kololo", "All I Want is You", "Heaven", "Made for You", and "All for You".

== Personnel ==
Credits adapted from back cover.

- Chidinma Ekile - vocals, songwriting
- Nonso Amadi - vocals, songwriting, production (track 2)
- Maleek Shoyebi - vocals, songwriting, production (track 9)
- TK - production (tracks 1, 4), mixing (track 4)
- Cobhams Asuquo - production (tracks 5, 10), co-writer (tracks 3, 8)
- Chris Cubeta - production (track 6), mixing (tracks 1, 2, 5, 6, 7)
- Masterkraft - production (track 3, 7, 8)
- Eniola Akinbo - co-writer (track 10)
- Suka Sounds - mixing (tracks 3, 8), mastering (tracks 3, 4, 8)
- Alex Deturk - mastering (tracks 1, 2, 5, 6, 7)

== Release history ==
Release history and formats for Songs About U
Region	Date	Format	Label
Various	1 June 2017	Digital download	Empire Mates
