= Ling and Lamb =

TikTok duo

- Ling and Lamb Logo
- Occupations: TikToker; YouTuber

TikTok information
- Page: lingandlamb
- Followers: 2.5 million

YouTube information
- Channel: LingandLamb
- Years active: 2018–present
- Genres: Talk show; Cooking; Pranking
- Subscribers: 572 thousand
- Last updated: 11 December 2021
- Website: www.lingandlamb.com

Ling and Lamb is an American-Nigerian TikTok, and YouTube channel created by Taccara Rae (Ling), and Yinka Lawanson (Lamb). The channel produces the Storytime, a vlog talk series on relationship, and marriages. As of December 2023, the Ling and Lamb channel has approximately 1.5 million subscribers, with over 500 million views on YouTube, and 4 million followers on TikTok.

== History ==
The creators of Ling and Lamb, are originally from America (Ling - Taccara Rae) and Nigeria (Lamb - Yinka Lawanson). On October 24, 2018, they opened their YouTube channel "Ling and Lamb", and started posting in August 2020 on their channel, during the COVID-19 lockdowns.

The couple began posting on TikTok in May 2020 during the lockdowns. In September 2020, they went viral on YouTube after they posted a video of Yinka introducing Taccara to one of his favorite Nigerian dishes, Okro Soup. As of December 11, 2021, Taccara's prank on Yinka, became their most viewed and liked video on their TikTok, with 9.7 million views, and 1.7 million likes.

On 6 May 2021, the duo received their first YouTube Plaques, for reaching 100k subscribers on their channel. On 28 August 2021, the duo went viral in India, after they visited an Indian restaurant in America, to eat Lamb Vindaloo for the first time. Yinka Lawanson's reaction to the meal took over social media in India, after the vlog was posted on YouTube, and TikTok by Taccara Rae.

== Podcast ==
On 27 July 2021, the podcast Keep it Reel with Ling and Lamb, presented by Ling and Lamb was launched on Apple Podcasts. It is hosted by Yinka Lawanson, and Taccara Rae. The couple discuss problems in marriages, and relationship requested by fans.

== Partnerships ==
In March 2020, they announced their partnership with Crocs, after videos of Lamboginny seriously in-love with Crocs went viral.

== Humanitarian work ==
In 2020, they gave back to their community in Fairfield County, during the early stages of the pandemic, the couple distributes groceries within Connecticut. On 11 September 2021, the couple launched The Food Is Ready Project, with the aim to feed 1 million kids from various continents. The project kicked-off in Uganda, as they feed meals to kids.

== Personal life ==
The creators, Yinka Lawanson, and Taccara Rae got engaged on 17 November 2017, and got married on 5 January 2018.
