= Maleek Berry =

Musical artist (born 1987)

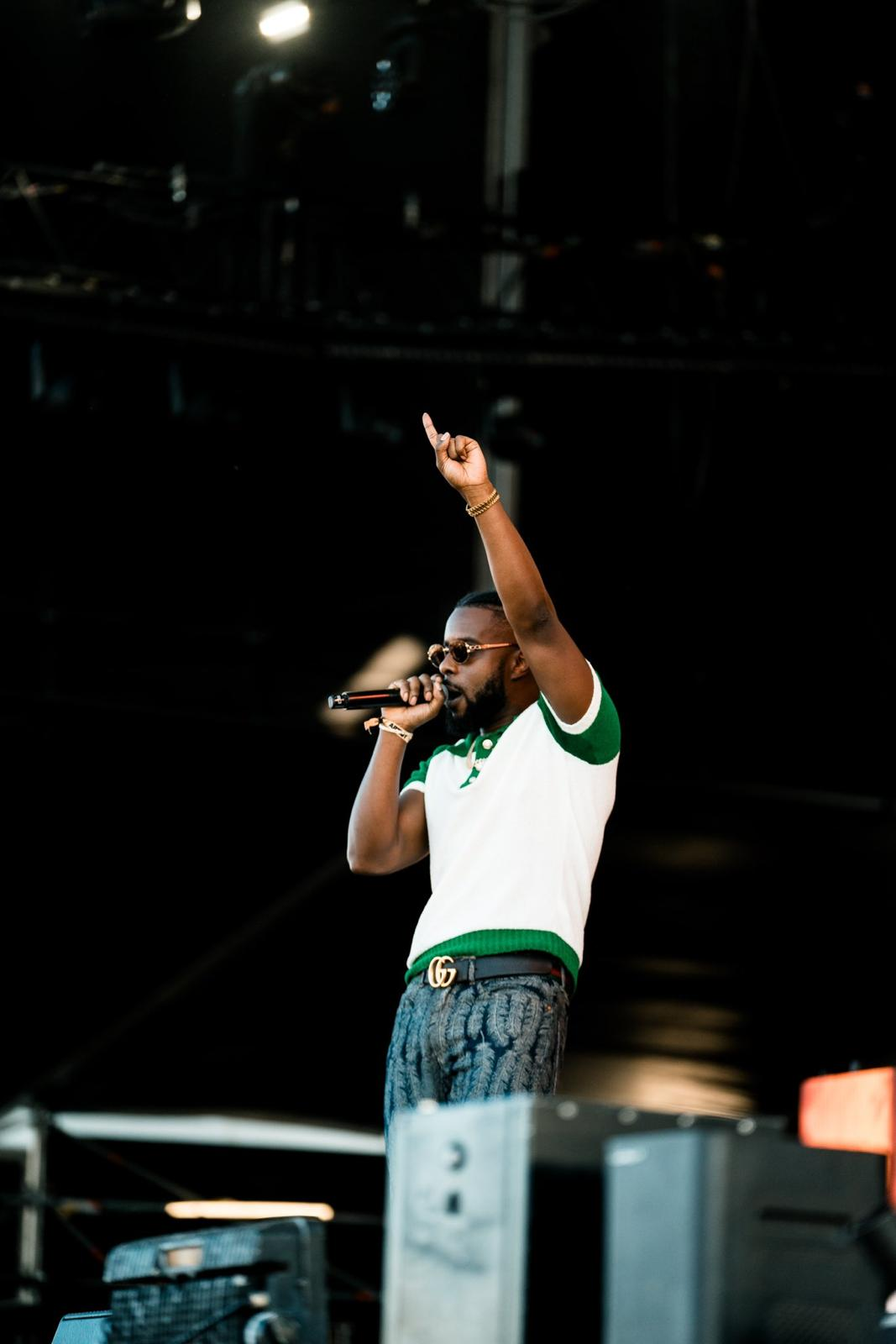
- Berry in 2023
- Born: Maleek Shoyebi; 11 August 1987 (age 39); South London, United Kingdom
- Occupations: Record producer, singer, songwriter, audio engineer
- Years active: 2007–present
- Musical career
- Genres: Afro pop; hip-hop; Afrobeats; R&B; pop
- Instruments: Digital audio workstation, vocals, keyboard
- Labels: Berry's Room; Starboy Entertainment
- Website: maleekberry.com

Maleek Shoyebi (born 11 August 1987), professionally known as Maleek Berry, is a British-Nigerian singer and record producer. After his break into the spotlight in 2012, Maleek Berry was nominated for Music Producer of the Year at the 2014 Nigeria Entertainment Awards. Maleek Berry has worked with prominent artists such as Wizkid, Davido, Wale, Fuse ODG, Runtown and Iyanya. In 2017, Berry was nominated in the Best Male category at the 2017 MOBO Awards.

== Discography ==
=== Singles ===
Year	Title	Certifications	Album
2013	"The Matter" (featuring Wizkid)		Non-album singles
2013	"Love You" (featuring Wizkid)		Non-album singles
2013	"New Bounce" (featuring Wizkid & Phenom)		Non-album singles
2014	"Feel Me" (featuring Wizkid)		Non-album singles
2015	"One Life" (featuring Wizkid)		Non-album singles
2015	"For My People" (featuring Sneakbo)		Non-album singles
2016	"On Fire"		Non-album singles
2016	"Kontrol"	BPI: Silver	Last Daze of Summer
2016	"Eko Miami"(featuring Geko)		Last Daze of Summer
2017	"Bend It"		Non-album single
2017	"Been Calling"		First Daze of Winter
2017	"4 Me"		First Daze of Winter
2017	"Pon My Mind"		First Daze of Winter
2018	"Sisi Maria"		First Daze of Winter
2018	"Gimmie Life"		Non-album singles
2018	"Love You Long Time" (featuring Chip)		Non-album singles
2018	"Doing U"		Non-album singles
2018	"Wait"		Non-album singles
2019	"Flashy"		Non-album singles

==== As featured artist ====
Title	Year	Peak chart positions	Certifications	Album
Title	Year	UK	Certifications	Album
"All for You" (Banky W. featuring Maleek Berry)	2014	—		Songs About U
"They Know (Wan Mo)" (IKES featuring Maleek Berry)	2015	—		Non-album single
"Dem Hail" (Mazi Chukz featuring Maleek Berry)	2016	—		Non-album single
"See My Baby" (Zafi B featuring Maleek Berry)	2016			Non-album single
"Facetime (Remix)" (Fresh L featuring Naeto C and Maleek Berry)	2016	—		Non-album single
"Early in the Morning" (Juls featuring Maleek Berry and Nonso Amadi)	2017	—		Leap of Faith
"Juice" (YCEE featuring Maleek Berry)	2017	—	BPI: Silver	The First Wave
"One Call Away" (Legendury Beatz featuring Maleek Berry)	2017	—		Afropop 101
"Lifestyle" (Ajebutter22 featuring Maleek Berry)	2017	—		What Happens in Lagos
"Confidence" (Raye featuring Maleek Berry, produced by Nana Rogues)	2018	—		Side Tape
"Love Can Do" (Legendury Beatz featuring Maleek Berry)	2018	—		Non-album single
"Sit Back Down" (Not3s featuring Maleek Berry)	2018	61	BPI: Gold	Non-album single
"See You Again" (MHD featuring Maleek Berry)	2019	—		Non-album single
"Show Me Mercy (IYKZ featuring Maleek Berry)	2019	—		Non-album single
"Immortal" (Simi featuring Maleek Berry)	2019	—		Non-album single
"Turn Me On" (Mut4y featuring Maleek Berry)	2019	—		Non-album single
"Feelings" (Sarkodie featuring Maleek Berry)	2019	—		Non-album single
"Zulu Screams" (GoldLink featuring Maleek Berry and Bibi Bourelly)	2019	—		Diaspora
"—" denotes items which were not released in that country or failed to chart.

=== Guest appearances ===
Title	Year	Artist(s)	Album
"Bambi Too (Remix)"	2017	Jidenna, Quavo, Sarkodie	—N/a
"Take the Lead"	2018	Chip, Kranium,	Ten10
"Dabebi"	2018	Mr Eazi, King Promise	N/A

== Production discography ==
Year	Song	Artist(s)	Album
2011	"Carolina"	Sauce Kid (featuring Davido)	Non-album single
2012	"Video"	Davido	Omo Baba Olowo
2012	"Enter the Centre"	Davido	Omo Baba Olowo
2012	"For You"	Davido (featuring 2face Idibia)	Omo Baba Olowo
2012	"The Warrior"	IKES (featuring Davido)	Non-album single
2013	"The Matter"	Maleek Berry (featuring Wizkid)	Non-album single
2013	"Love You"	Maleek Berry (featuring Wizkid)	Non-album single
2013	"Let it Go"	IKES	Non-album single
2013	"My Way"	Wande Coal	Wanted
2013	"Outro (Love Music)"	Wizkid	Non-album single
2013	"Just Say Go"	Tyson Noir	Non-album single
2014	"Faith"	DJ JoeNel (featuring BM Baby)	Non-album single
2014	"Plan B"	Wande Coal	Non-album single
2014	"Shine"	Sinzu	Non-album single
2014	"All for You"	Banky W (featuring Maleek Berry)	Non-album single
2014	"Finito"	Iyanya	Non-album single
2014	"Baby Hello"	Wande Coal	Wanted
2014	"Murder"	Wizkid (featuring Wale)	Ayo
2014	"Ye Play"	Fuse ODG	T.I.N.A.
2015	"Amin"	Wizkid	Non-album single
2015	"Nonso"	D'Prince (featuring Reekado Banks)	Non-album single
2015	"Leyla (Remix)"	Angel (featuring Fuse ODG, Seyi Shay & Wande Coal)	Non-album single
2015	"Ati Dé"	Naeto C	Festival
2015	"We Ball"	Wande Coal (featuring Maleek Berry)	Wanted
2015	"African Lady"	Wande Coal (featuring Maleek Berry)	Wanted
2015	"Plenty Love"	Wande Coal (featuring Maleek Berry)	Wanted
2015	"Lowkey"	Wande Coal (featuring Maleek Berry)	Wanted
2015	"Kpono"	Wande Coal (featuring Wizkid)	Wanted
2015	"Walahi"	Runtown	Ghetto University
2015	"Phantom"	BOJ (featuring Runtown)	Non-album single
2015	"Let Me Love You"	Runtown	Ghetto University
2015	"Talk For Me"	Runtown	Ghetto University
2015	"Lagos to Kampala"	Runtown (featuring Wizkid)	Ghetto University
2015	"Sarki Zaki"	Runtown (featuring M.I & Hafeez)	Ghetto University
2015	"Show Me"	Moelogo	Non-album single
2017	"Until the Dawn"	Efya (featuring Maleek Berry)	Non-album single

== Awards and nominations ==
Year	Award ceremony	Prize	Recipient	Result	Ref
2014	Nigeria Entertainment Awards	Music Producer of the Year	Himself	Nominated	
2017	MOBO Awards	Best Male Act	Himself	Nominated	
2017	MOBO Awards	Best African Act	Himself	Nominated	
