= Aramide (musician) =

Nigerian Afro-soul singer and songwriter

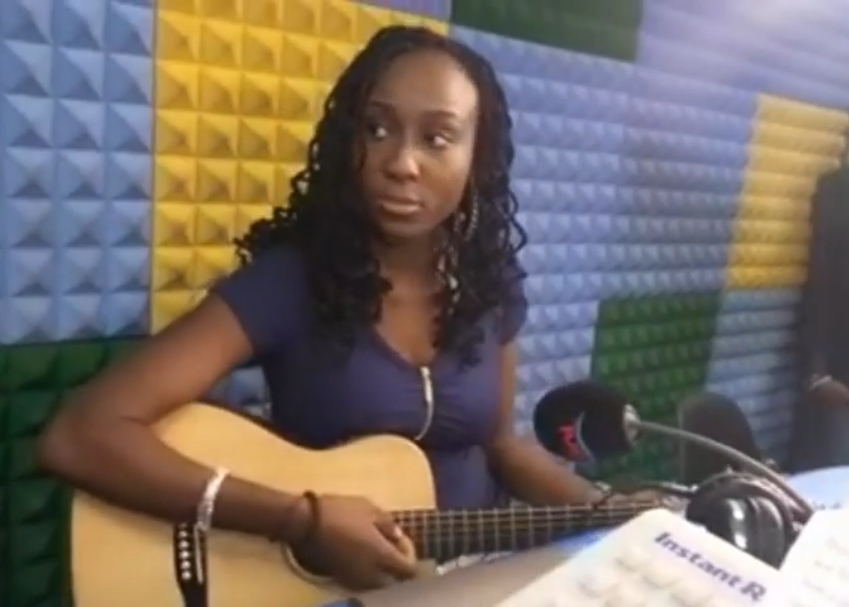

Background information
- Born: Nigeria
- Origin: Ibadan, Nigeria
- Genres: Afro-soul; jazz
- Occupations: Singer; songwriter
- Instruments: Saxophone; guitar
- Years active: 2011–present
- Label: Arry Moore
- Website: www.aramidemusic.com

Aramide is a Nigerian Afro-soul singer and songwriter. She won Best Vocal Performance (Female) for "Iwo Nikan" at the Headies 2015. She graduated with a political science degree from the University of Jos.

In 2019, Aramide was appointed by The Recording Academy to the board of governors for the Washington, D.C. chapter of the Academy.

== Life and career ==
=== Personal life ===
Aramide is married and has a child. Her traditional marriage and white wedding were held on 18 April 2015 in her hometown, Ibadan.

== Music career and breakthrough single ==
Aramide's music quest started in 2006, when she contested on ‘Star Quest’ one of Nigeria's most prestigious and competitive music talent hunt shows. Her band did very well in the competition as they were judged the 3rd Runners Up. In 2008, she was a part of a show called ‘Divas Unplugged’ in the famous city of Jos in Nigeria; the show had all the leading female artistes in the Nigerian music industry and her participation in this show was very challenging and rewarding, and her performance and involvement was very inspirational. On September 9, 2014 she got signed to Baseline Music after exiting from Trybe Records.

=== Iwo Nikan ===
On February 4, 2015 Aramide released her first single under Baseline Music, "Iwo Nikan", which ended up not just being a single but a breakthrough for her and the label Baseline Music. She won Best Vocal Performance for the same song "Iwo Nikan" at The Headies Award 2015.

=== Musical influence and genres ===
Aramide's music is influenced by Erykah Badu, Miriam Makeba, Sade, and Angélique Kidjo. Aramide fuses soul and jazz with African music to depict her sound. She performs in Yoruba and English, and is known for her style, which she calls Afro-Soul.

=== Suitcase ===
Aramide's debut album Suitcase was released November 22, 2016. It features guest appearances from Sound Sultan, Ice Prince, Adekunle Gold, Koker and Sir Dauda. The album was produced by Cobhams, Laitan Dada, Sizzle Pro and Tintin.

=== Aramide Suitcase Live (ASL) ===
Aramide embarked on a debut tour and showcased her album in the United States, Ghana, Nigeria, Canada and other countries. The tour was titled "Aramide Suitcase Live" (ASL).

=== Songversation With Aramide (SWA) ===
Songversation With Aramide is an initiative of Afro-Soul/Jazz musician Aramide. The event, which is in its second year, is held annually to mark the International Women's Day through the promotion of positive narratives for Nigerian women.

As a concert-style event, it blends music with topical conversation to motivate women to take the lead, foster personal development and gain societal recognition. The event, also celebrates the achievements of women who have made impact in the unique fields.

With featured performances from Aramide and other artistes, the event highlights the power of music in championing the goals of women.

== Notable performances and songs ==
She has been performing in several popular events and shows since she rose to stardom in United Kingdom, Canada, Dubai, Nigeria, Ghana etc.:

=== As lead artist ===
List of Aramide's singles as lead artist before debut Album

Title	Year
"Killing Me"	2011
"It’s Over"	2011
"Feeling This Feeling"	2014
"Iwo Nikan"	2015
"Odun Tuntun"	2015
"I Don't Care"	2015
"Love Me"	2016
"FunMi Lowo"	2016

Her single "I Don’t Care" was spotted on number 1 spot on MTN Yhello Top 10 Nigeria Chart, number 4 on Alternative Music Naija Chart on Top Radio 90.9 FM and number 3 on Alternative Nigeria Chart on Radio Continental 102.3FM. Also "Love Me" picked on number 1 spot on Alternative Nigerian Chart on The Beat 99.9 FM and on number 3 spot on Playdata Chart.

Chart (2015–16)	Song	Peak position
MTN Yhello Top 10 Nigeria	"I Don't Care"	1
Top Radio 90.9 FM	"I Don't Care"	4
Radio Continental 102.3FM	"I Don't Care"	3
The Beat 99.9 FM	"Love Me"	1
Playdata Chart	"Love Me"	3
The Beat 99.9 FM	"FunMi Lowo"	1
Playdata Chart	"FunMi Lowo"	10

=== As featured artist ===
List of singles as featured artist
Title	Artist Name(s)	Year
"Falling" (featuring. Faze & Aramide)	"Femi Jubal"	2011
"Fever" (featuring. Aramide, Yemi Alade & Jowhiz)	"Sizzle Pro"	2014
"Rise" (featuring. Muna, Nikki Laoye, Glowreeyah Braimah, J’odie, Aramide, Shola Allyson, Onos & Joan Ekpai)	"Titi"	2015
"Lamba" (featuring. Aramide & Reekado Banks)	"Mr Chidoo"	2015

=== Covers ===
List of Covers as lead artist
Title	Year
"ELDee's – Today Today (Cover)"	2012
"Davido’s Ekuro (Cover)"	2013
"Tuface's – Amaka (Cover)"	2018

== Awards and nominations ==
Year	Awards ceremony	Award description(s)	Results	Ref
2015	All Africa Music Awards	Most Promising Artist in Africa	Nominated	
2015	The Headies	Best Vocal Performance (Female) ("Iwo Nikan")	Won	
2015	Nigeria Entertainment Awards	Female Artist of the Year	Nominated	
2016	Nigeria Entertainment Awards	Alternative Artist	Won	
2016	The Headies	Best Vocal Performance (Female) ("Love Me")	Nominated	
2016	The Headies	NEXT RATED	Nominated	
2016	All Africa Music Awards - AFRIMA	Best Female Artist in West Africa	Won	
2017	All Africa Music Awards - AFRIMA	Best Female Artist in West Africa	Nominated	
2018	The Headies Award	Best Alternative Song (Funmi Lowo Remix ft. Sound Sultan & Koker)	Won	
