= Lami Phillips =

Nigerian singer, song writer and actress

- Born: April 4, 1980 (age 46); Chicago
- Occupation: Counselling
- Known for: Music
- Notable work: So amazing featuring Tiwa Savage

Lami Phillips Gbadamosi (born 1980 in Chicago, Illinois), professionally known as Lami Phillips, is a Nigerian singer, songwriter and actress. She is United Nations (UN) envoy and Oxfam Ambassador for Women and Youths.

== Early life ==
Phillips was born in Chicago, Illinois. and later moved to Nigeria with her parents and siblings where she attended elementary school at Corona School, Victoria Island. She later moved back to England in her teenage years and lived there for about eleven years. At the time she was in the UK studying, she took vocal lessons and also joined the choir at her church (Jesus

House, UK).

== Educational background ==
Phillips went to Corona School, Victoria Island, Lagos for her elementary schooling. She also completed her BA (Hons) at the University of Kent, United Kingdom, then obtained her MA degree from the University of Nottingham. Phillips also has an Executive MBA from the Pennsylvania State University.

== Career ==
Having started her music career professionally, she has since released an Album "Intuition" and various singles such as; Baby, Orimiwu and Yago. Also into acting ' she acted in King of boys directed by Kemi Adetiba.

== Personal life ==
She is married to a childhood friend Labo Obowole Gbadamosi and they have two daughters.
