= Ibrahim Babajide Obanikoro =

Nigerian Politician

Honourable Ibrahim Babajide Obanikoro
- Born: 30 June 1981 (age 45); Lagos
- Other name: also referred to as IBO
- Occupation: Politician
- Political party: All Progressives Congress (APC)
- Other political affiliations: Peoples Democratic Party
- Website: https://ibo.org.ng/

Ibrahim Babajide Obanikoro (often referred to as IBO) is a Nigerian politician.

== Early life, education and career ==
Ibrahim Babajide Obanikoro was born on 30 June 1981 in Lagos, Nigeria. His father, Musiliu Obanikoro, is a former Nigerian senator and has served as Minister of State for Defence, He attended King's College, Lagos, Nigeria, before pursuing higher education in the United States. He obtained a Bachelor of Science degree in Political science from St. Cloud State University in Minnesota, USA, and also earned a Master's degree in Public administration (MPA) from Pace University in New York.

While studying in the US, he gained knowledge and skills in Criminal justice administration and completed an internship at the Courthouse in St. Cloud University, Minnesota. He served as an Assistant Liaison Officer under Commissioner Turner at the Brooklyn Borough Districts. Additionally, he worked as a Graduate Assistant at Pace University in New York.

After completing his education in the US, Babajide returned to Nigeria, where he had his compulsory National Youth Service Corps (NYSC) with Zenith Bank PLC. He was retained as an Executive assistant in the bank and later joined MOB Integrated Services Nigeria Limited, where he rose to the position of Executive director. He founded Ejide Farms and Ilori Farm House that specialise in the production of tilapia fish, cows, and rams.

== Political career ==
Ibrahim Bababjide Obanikoro began his political journey at the age of 29 in 2011 when he ran for the Lagos State House of Assembly as the representative for Eti-Osa Constituency II, under the platform of the People's Democratic Party (PDP), which he lost. He later contested for the Chairmanship position of the Ikoyi/Obalende Local Council Development Area and was declared the winner. However, his victory was eventually nullified by an Appeal Court verdict on technical grounds.

In February 2018, Babajide joined the ruling party, the All Progressives Congress (APC). In line with the "Not-Too-Young-To-Run" movement, in the 2019 general election, he contested for the House of Representatives seat in his constituency – Eti-Osa Federal Constituency – under the APC banner and was elected. He was subsequently inaugurated as a member of the Young Parliamentarians Forum (YPF) of the 9th National Assembly and elected deputy chairman.

As a member of the House of Representatives, he launched an empowerment program that provided financial grants to petty traders, motorbikes to resident associations, and security operatives to aid their community security efforts. He facilitated many legislative programs that was sponsored by the Small and Medium Scale Enterprises Agency of Nigeria (SMEDAN) to combat poverty and promote human capital development in Eti-Osa. He also distributed over 1,000 laptops to students, resident associations, and the Nigeria Police in his constituency.

However, Obanikoro lost his bid for re-election to the Eti-Osa House of Representatives seat to the candidate of the Labour Party, Attah Thaddeus.

== Constituency ticket controversy ==
In May 2022, a controversy arose following the All Progressives Congress (APC) House of Representatives ticket primaries for the Eti-Osa constituency on the Federal House of Representatives. Ibrahim Babajide Obanikoro lost his bid for a second term by 23 votes to Oyekanmi Elegushi, who secured 25 votes.

However, Elegushi displayed deference to the party's leadership and voluntarily withdrew his candidacy, resolving the controversy.
