= Kirikiri Maximum Security Prison =

Super Max Prison in Nigeria

Coordinates: 6.4445°N 3.3079°E

Kirikiri Maximum Security Prison is a prison west of Apapa, Lagos State, Nigeria. It is named after the rural Kirikiri community in which it is situated. A part of the Nigerian Correctional Service, its official capacity is 1,056. It was first established in 1955. Paul Chiama of Leadership wrote that "The mention of Kirikiri first reminds any Nigerian of" this prison.

As of February 1, 1990 its official capacity was 956 but it actually had 1,645 prisoners. A 1995 report by the Immigration and Refugee Board of Canada stated that it was "already infamous" for its overcrowding. In March 2018, the United Kingdom announced it would spend $939,000 to build a new 112-bed wing, in order to facilitate the transfer of Nigerian prisoners from the UK.

Some death row inmates are held at Kirikiri.

The prison was mentioned in a Law & Order: Special Victims Unit episode: Rituals (Season 5 Episode 14) as the prison where a child slave trader named Martin Bosa was sent to after he was deported/extradited.

== History ==
Kirikiri Maximum Security Prison was built in the year 1955 with an initial capacity of 1056 inmates. As of February 12, 2018, 69% of the prison's population were inmates awaiting trial according to data from the Nigeria Prisons Service.

== Meals ==
Up until October 2021 at Kirikiri Maximum Security Prison, prisoners were formerly fed 450 naira worth of food a day (around US$1.08 as of May 2022). In October 2021 the Senate Committee on Interior increased the daily ration to 1000 naira (around $2.41 as of May 2022). Officials of the Nigerian Correctional Service had suggested a 750 naira daily allowance, but the Senate Committee stated that this amount was "grossly inadequate". In a May 2022 Vanguard interview, a prisoner who asked not to be identified stated that the meals at Kirikiri were "poor and horrible". For example, per the unnamed prisoner, breakfast consists solely of poorly cooked beans every morning, seven days a week. The unnamed prisoner also characterized the increase in the daily food allowance as "all lies", stating, "you need to come and see it to know exactly what I am talking about" and "come and see horrible food! It is even getting worse."

Another prisoner interviewed for the May 2002 Vanguard article stated that "even a hungry dog will reject the food they serve us", and that some prisoners rely upon being able to cook food in their own cells for subsistence. Raw foods for prisoners to cook in their cells can be purchased through the prisons welfare officer, and some prisoners have kerosene stoves for cooking.

Another inmate stated that the prison has a separate "VIP section", where inmates have their own cook, a person to wash clothes, errand persons and a generating set that supplies electricity.

In May 2022, a spokesperson with the Lagos State prisons Command denied claims that prisoners were still only receiving 450 naira worth of food daily, stating, "there has been a review of the feeding as stated in the Nigerian Correctional Facilities Act of 2019. The N450 initial provision was reviewed upward but I am sure it is not up to N1000. I must tell you that regarding feeding in the prisons, there is a unit measurement that we use for each ration of food for inmates." In contrast to this statement, a senior prison officer who asked to be unnamed stated that "nothing has changed with regards to the feeding of inmates across the country" and that "nothing has changed here in terms of quality and quantity of food the inmates eat. It is still the regular miserable Ẹ̀bà with watery egusi soup, beans and rice." The senior officer also stated that "the only way that inmates survive is by providing their own food."

== Notable past prisoners ==
- Chief Bode George
- Clifford Orji
- Al-Mustapha
- Major General Shehu Musa Yar’Adua
- Fela Anikulapo Kuti
- Olusegun Obasanjo
- Chris Abani
