= Harrysong =

Nigerian singer and songwriter

Harrysong Tare
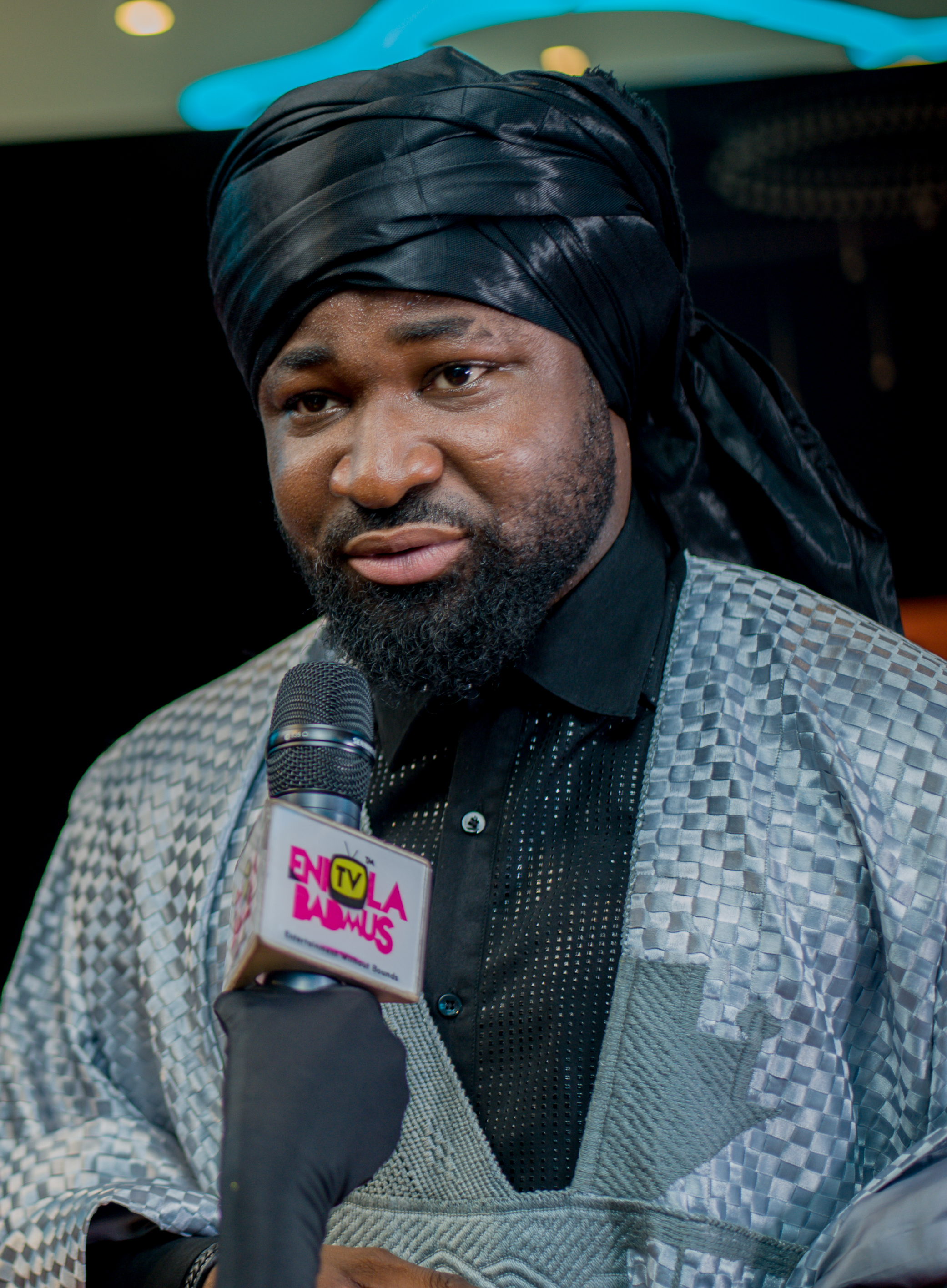
- Harrysong at AMVCA 2020

Background information
- Also known as: Mr. Songz
- Born: Harrison Tare Okiri; Warri, Delta State, Nigeria
- Genres: R&B, afropop, african hip hop, dancehall, highlife
- Occupations: Versatile Singer, songwriter, instrumentalist and performer
- Instruments: Vocals, piano, drums, conga, guitar
- Years active: 2008—present
- Labels: Current: Alterplate Music Company; Former: Five Star Music; QuestionMark Entertainment
- Website: www.altarplate.ng

Harrison Tare Okiri (born 30 March 1981) better known by his stage name Harrysong, is a Nigerian singer, songwriter and instrumentalist who rose to fame after his tribute song to Nelson Mandela won the "Most Downloaded Callertune Award" at The Headies 2013. Harrysong was born in Warri, Delta State, Nigeria to Ijaw parents but moved to Lagos in 2007 after spending some of his early life in Port Harcourt.

Prior to signing to QuestionMark Entertainment, Harrysong used to perform at night clubs until he met Kcee who introduced him to top music personalities. In 2014, Harrysong was nominated in the "Best Pop/R&B Artist of the Year" category at the 2014 Nigeria Entertainment Awards after the release of his chart-topping song "Beta Pikin".

== Early life ==
Harrysong was born as the only child to Ijaw parents in Warri, Delta State. After the death of his mother, a strained relationship between him and his step-mother led to his drop-out from school and his involvement with music grew after moving to Port Harcourt.

== Career ==
At age eleven, Harrysong's music career started in the church his mother served as the music director before he went on to learn contemporary gospel music. In 2007, he moved to Lagos as the lead singer of a live band who perform in night clubs until he met Kcee which led to him signing for Five Star Music. His rise to fame came when he released the single "I'm In Love" and "Taiye & Kehinde" with the music video of the former topping music video charts including Trace TV. He went on to release his debut album Testify through QuestionMark Entertainment in 2012. However, just before COVID-19 entered Nigeria he released a new song titled Bumbumbum which he teamed up with Davido.

== Personal life ==
On June 22, 2017, Harrysong welcomed twins with Alexer Perez Gopa named (boy; Perez & girl; Tare). On February 4, 2021, he confirmed his engagement with Alexer Perez Gopa on his Instagram page, and they got married on March 27, 2021, in Warri.

== Awards and nominations ==
=== Selected awards and nominations ===
Year	Award ceremony	Prize	Recipient/Nominated work	Result	Ref
2013	8th Nigeria Music Video Awards	Best Pop Extra Video	"I'm in Love (Remix)"	Nominated	
2013	The Headies 2013	Most Downloaded Callertune	"Tribute to Mandela"	Won	
2014	2014 Nigeria Entertainment Awards	Best Pop/R&B Artist of the Year	Himself	Nominated	
2014	9th Nigeria Music Video Awards	Best Contemporary Afro Video	"Kolombo"	Won	
2014	9th Nigeria Music Video Awards	Best Pop Extra Video	"My Story"	Won	
2015	The Sun Awards 2015	Creative Person of the Year	Himself	Won	
2016	2016 Ghana Music Awards	African Artiste of the Year	Himself	Nominated	
2016	2016 Nigeria Entertainment Awards	Best Collabo	"Reggae Blues"	Nominated	
2016	The Headies 2016	Best Pop Single	"Reggae Blues"	Won	
2021	The Beatz Awards	Special Recognition Award	Himself	Won	

== Discography ==
Studio albums

- Testify (2012)
- Kingmaker (2017)
- God Amongst Men (2023)

EPs

- Right About Now (2020)

=== Selected singles ===
- "I'm in Love"
- "I Want You (Gyptian cover)"
- "Obu Ego (Hustle)"
- "Taiye & Kehinde"
- "I'm in Love Remix"(featuring Olamide)
- "When She Loves"
- "Better Pikin"
- "Kolombo"
- "Ofeshe"
- "Reggae Blues"(featuring Olamide, Iyanya, Kcee, Orezi)
- "Baba for the girls"(featuring Kcee)
- "Arabanko"
- "Comsa"
- "Under The Duvet"
- "Happiness"
- "Selense"
- "Tekero"
- "Report Card"
- "Chacha" (Remix) (featuring Zlatan ibile)
- "Kona ft Rudeboy
- "Piompiompiom
