= Banky W. =

Nigerian singer (born 1981)

Banky W
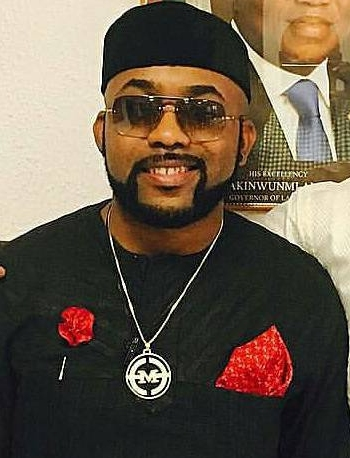
- Born: Olubankole Wellington; 27 March 1981 (age 45); New York City, U.S.
- Education: Rensselaer Polytechnic Institute
- Spouse: Adesua Etomi (m. 2017)
- Children: 2
- Musical career
- Genres: R&B, pop rap
- Occupations: Singer; songwriter; actor; rapper; politician; entrepreneur
- Instrument: Vocals
- Years active: 2002–present
- Label: Empire Mates Entertainment

Olubankole Wellington// (born 27 March 1981), popularly known by his stage name Banky W. and credited in film as Banky Wellington, is a Nigerian-American singer, rapper, actor, entrepreneur and politician.

== Early life ==
Olubankole Wellington was born in the United States on 27 March 1981 to Nigerian parents. His family returned to Nigeria when he was five years old. He began singing at a young age in his church choir. His ethnicity is Yoruba.

== Education ==
Wellington schooled in Lagos for his primary education. He attended Home Science Association Secondary School for his secondary education and returned to further his tertiary education at Rensselaer Polytechnic Institute, New York, US on a scholarship. He started the record label Empire Mates Entertainment (E.M.E) in 2002 while studying. He also worked at GlobalSpec. In 2009, he left the US for Nigeria and established his record label in Lagos by signing artists like Niyola, Shaydee, Skales, and Wizkid to the label. He released a début studio album, Back in the Building, in 2005. His début single was Ebute Metta He wrote the first theme song of Etisalat Nigeria titled "0809ja for life".

== Career ==
=== Shuga ===
Banky W made a significant contribution to the first season of MTV Shuga by providing the show's theme song, "Shuga" featuring Wizkid, L-Tido and Boneye. His music not only captured the energy and essence of the series but also played a key role in defining the soundtrack of African youth culture at the time. This collaboration set the tone for the impactful storytelling that Shuga became known for, combining entertainment with important messages about relationships and health. MTV Shuga Mashariki makes its return to East Africa in 2025 with a host of new stories that are sure to excite the young audience.

=== 2012–2013: R&BW ===
The day after Valentine's Day of 2013, Wellington launched his new album R&BW with a concert tagged the "Grand Love Concert" at the Civic Centre, Ozumba Mbadiwe, Victoria Island, Lagos, which featured several other artistes including Iyanya and Waje. The first two singles from the album are "Lowkey" and "Yes/No".

=== 2017: Dissolution of E.M.E ===
Wellington announced in February 2018 that E.M.E was being dissolved as a record label; he said the label would move forward as a talent management company focused on creative marketing, advertising, PR, and brand events. Wellington named DJ Xclusive, Ebuka Obi-Uchendu, Tolu 'Toolz' Oniru, and his wife Adesua Etomi as the first set of clients of the rebranded company.

== Other collaborations ==
In 2017, Wellington took part in initialing of a monumental collaboration art piece, Iyasile Naa also known as The Legacy.

== Political career ==
On 11 November 2018, Wellington announced his intent to run for the Lagos' Eti-Osa Federal Constituency seat in Nigeria's House of Representatives, on the platform of Modern Democratic Party, formed in 2017.

On 23 February 2019, Wellington lost the Eti-Osa Federal Constituency Elections to Babajide Obanikoro of the All Progressive Congress (APC).

Ahead of the 2023 general election, Wellington announced that he had decamped from the Modern Democratic Party to the Peoples Democratic Party, seeking the party's ticket to again vie for the Lagos' Eti-Osa Federal Constituency seat in Nigeria's House of Representatives. In June 2022, Banky W won the Peoples Democratic Party ticket to contest as the party bearer for the Eti Osa constituency ahead of the 2023 election.

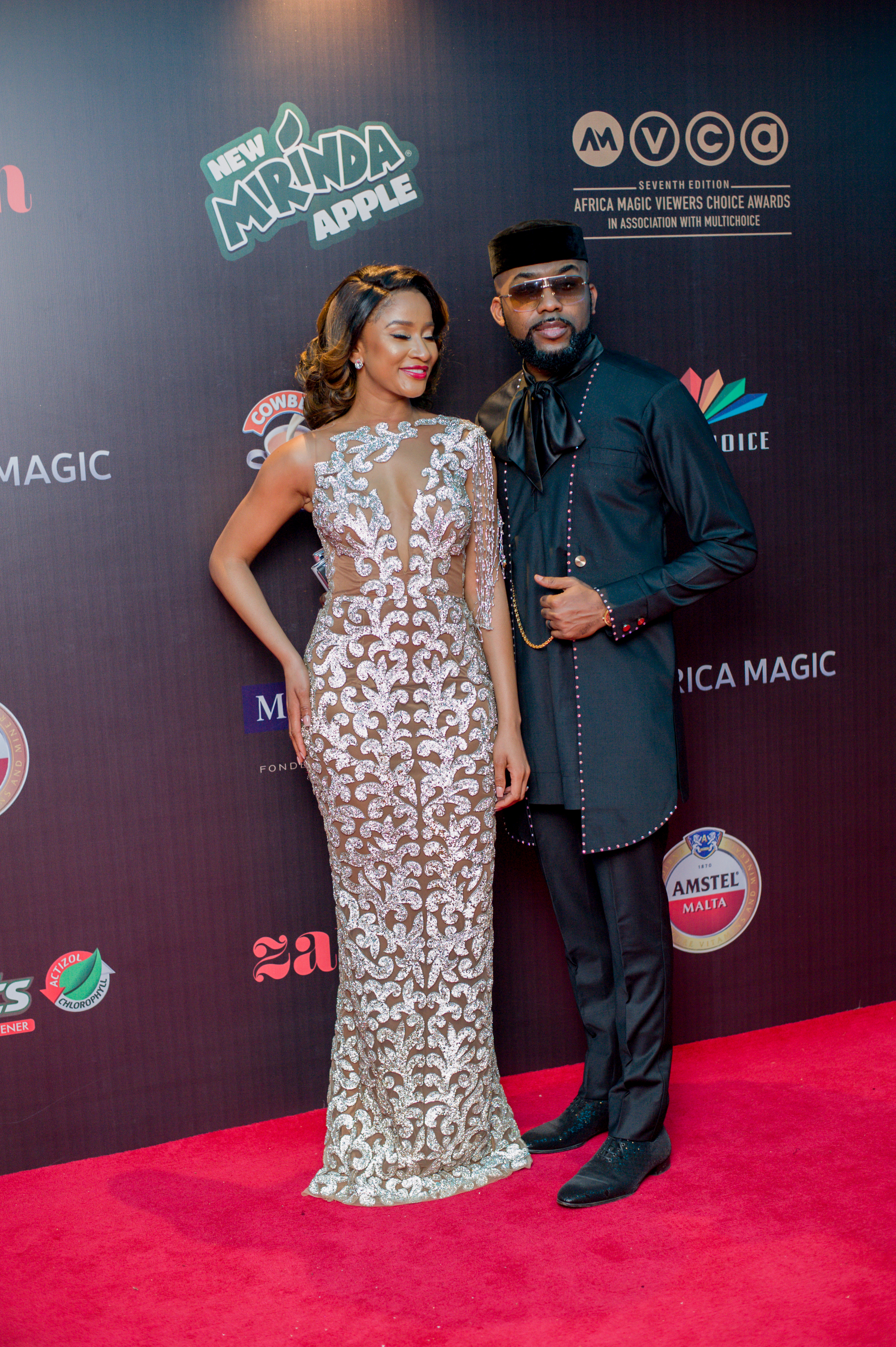
Banky W and wife Adesua Etomi at AMVCA 2020

However, the Presidential and Federal House of Representative election held on 25 February 2023 was won by the Labour Party (LP) candidate, Attah Thaddeus which saw Banky W losing again, the Federal Constituency seat in Nigeria. The INEC Returning Officer announced the result but the party agents did not agree with it. The Party agents contested the result but the police and the army were called to maintain peace and order. In an interview after the result of the result of the election was announced, Banky W accepted the result of the INEC and declared: "I feel very grateful, even in defeat, because of the things we were able to accomplish."

== Personal life ==
Wellington married Adesua Etomi traditionally on 19 November 2017; the couple subsequently had their white wedding performed in South Africa on 25 November 2017. He had a successful skin cancer surgery on his shoulder in 2017. In early 2021, Wellington and Adesua had a son, Hazaiah Wellington. They kept the pregnancy a secret, catching many off guard on news of the baby's arrival. In 2024, the couple announced the arrival of their second child on Instagram.

== Discography ==
Studio albums

- Back in the Building (2006)
- Mr. Capable (2008)
- The W Experience (2009)
- R&BW (2013)
- Songs About U (2017)
- The Bank Statements (2021)

EPs

- Undeniable (2003)

Compilation albums

- Empire Mates State of Mind (2012)

== Filmography ==
Year	Title	Role
2016	The Wedding Party	Dozie Onwuka
2017	The Wedding Party 2: Destination Dubai	Dozie Onwuka
2018	Up North	Bassey Otuekong
2019	Sugar Rush	Anikulapo

== Selected awards and nominations ==
- John Lennon Song Writing Award 2006, R&B Category, for 'My Regret'
- Best R&B Artiste, Nigerian Entertainment Awards 2006
- Best Male R&B Artiste, Urban Independent Music Awards, USA, 2006
- Best International Album, Nigerian Entertainment Awards 2007 for 'Mr. Capable'
- Best R&B Video, Nigerian Music Video Awards 2008 for 'Don't Break My Heart'
- Best Male Vocal Performance, Hip Hop World Awards 2009 for 'Don't Break My Heart'
- R&B Single of the Year, 2010 Hip Hop World Awards for 'Strong Ting'
- Best R&B Singer (Male) and Best Music Video 2010 City People Entertainment Awards

== See also ==
- List of Nigerian musicians
