= Niyola =

Nigerian musical artist (born 1985)

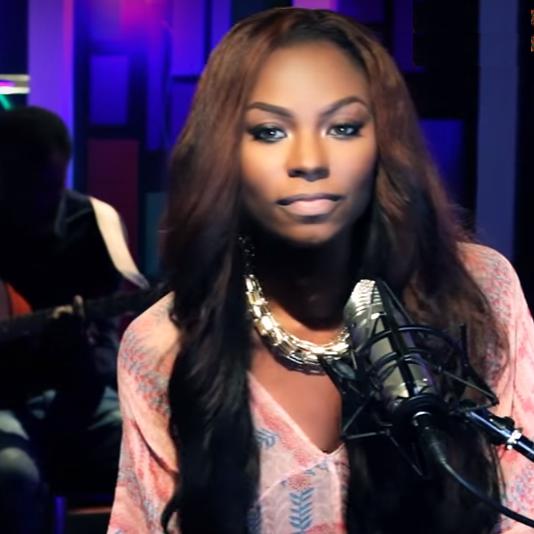
- 2014 on "The Juice"

Background information
- Born: Eniola Akimbo; 9 December 1985 (age 40); Lagos, Nigeria
- Genres: Soul; jazz
- Occupations: Singer; songwriter; actress
- Years active: 2005–present
- Labels: Empire Mates Entertainment

Eniola Akinbo (born 9 December 1985), known professionally as Niyola, is a Nigerian singer, songwriter, performing artist and actress.

== Early life ==
Akinbo was born on 9 December 1985, in Lagos, Nigeria. The youngest of ten children, she sang in church with her siblings and was inspired to pursue a career in music after attending a Funmi Adams concert. Niyola emerged runner up in the Amen Starlet competition in 2000.

== Career ==
She began her professional music career in 2005 and was briefly affiliated with eLDee’s Trybe Records. Following her stint at Trybe, she signed a production deal with Make Sum Noise Entertainment. Niyola’s first three singles "Me n U (In Da Club)", "No More" and "Dem Say" were released under the imprint. In 2012, Niyola signed a record deal with Empire Mates Entertainment. On 22 May 2013, she released the single "Toh Bad", her first release under the label.

== Discography ==
- Niyola (2008)

== Filmography ==
- Swallow (2021) as Tolani Ajao
- Stalker (2016) as Niyola

== Awards and nominations ==
Year	Awards ceremony	Award description(s)	Results
2013	The Headies	Best Vocal Performance (Female)	Nominated
2013	Nigeria Entertainment Awards	Most Promising Female Act to Watch	Nominated
2014	Nigeria Entertainment Awards	Female Artist of the Year	Nominated

== See also ==
- List of Nigerian musicians
