= List of awards and nominations received by Wizkid =

Wizkid awards and nominations
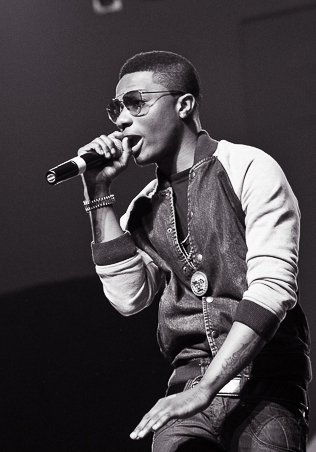
- Wizkid in 2013
Awards and nominations
| Award | Wins | Nominations |
| All Africa Music Awards | 8 | 21 |
| American Music Awards | 1 | 3 |
| BET Awards | 4 | 8 |
| Billboard Music Awards | 3 | 7 |
| Grammy Awards | 1 | 6 |
| iHeartRadio Music Awards | 3 | 5 |
| MOBO awards | 5 | 11 |
| MTV Europe Music Awards | 2 | 6 |
| MTV Video Music Awards | 1 | 5 |
| NAACP Image Awards | 6 | 8 |
| Nigeria Entertainment Awards | 6 | 26 |
| Soul Train Music Awards | 3 | 11 |
| The Headies | 19 | 63 |
| Teen Choice Awards | 1 | 1 |
| African entertainment award USA | 6 | 10 |
| South Africa music awards | 1 | 1 |

Totals (Note: Certain award groups do not simply award one winner. They acknowledge several different recipients, have runners-up, and have third place. Since this is a specific recognition and is different from losing an award, runner-up mentions are considered wins in this award tally. For simplification and to avoid errors, each award in this list has been presumed to have had a prior nomination.)
- Wins: 98
- Nominations: 318

This is a list of awards and nominations received by Nigerian singer and songwriter, Wizkid. Through his career he has earned several accolades, including a Grammy Award for his collaboration with Beyoncé on The Lion King: The Gift soundtrack with "Brown Skin Girl". He is the most awarded African artist at the BET Awards (4), Soul Train Awards (3), Billboard Awards (3), iHeartRadio Music Awards (5), NAACP Image Awards (8) and MOBO Awards (6), MTV VMA awards (2). He is also a recipient of an ASCAP plaque for Drake's "One Dance". Wizkid's contributions to the Nigerian music industry have also made him the most awarded artiste in The Headies award history.

== Music Awards ==
| Award | Year | Category | Work | Result | Ref |
|---|---|---|---|---|---|
| 3Music Awards | 2022 | African Song of the Year | "Essence" (Remix) (featuring Tems and Justin Bieber) | Won | |
| Afro X Digital Awards | 2021 | Pop Song of the Year By Male | "Essence" (Remix) (featuring Tems | Won | |
| Afro X Digital Awards | 2021 | Album Of The Year | "Made In Lagos" | Won | |
| Afro X Digital Awards | 2021 | Artiste of The Year | Himself | Won | |
| African Entertainment Awards USA | 2021 | Best Male Artist | Himself | Won | |
| African Entertainment Awards USA | 2021 | Artist of the Year | Himself | Nominated | |
| African Entertainment Awards USA | 2021 | Best Male Artist – Central/West Africa | Himself | Nominated | |
| African Entertainment Awards USA | 2021 | Album Of The Year | Made in Lagos | Won | |
| African Entertainment Awards USA | 2021 | Best Collaboration | "Essence" | Won | |
| African Entertainment Awards USA | 2021 | Best Collaboration | "Ginger" | Nominated | |
| African Entertainment Awards USA | 2021 | Best Video | "Essence" | Won | |
| African Entertainment Awards USA | 2021 | Song of the Year | "Essence" | Won | |
| African Entertainment Awards USA | 2020 | Best Male Artist | Himself | Nominated | |
| African Entertainment Awards USA | 2020 | Entertainer of the Year | Himself | Nominated | |
| African Entertainment Awards USA | 2019 | Best Video | "Soco" | Nominated | |
| African Entertainment Awards USA | 2019 | Entertainer of the Year | Himself | Nominated | |
| African Entertainment Awards USA | 2021 | Best Male Artist | Himself | Won | |
| African Entertainment Awards USA | 2023 | Artist of the Year | Himself | Nominated | |
| African Entertainment Awards USA | 2023 | Best Dressed Celebrity | Himself | Won | |
| African Entertainment Awards USA | 2023 | Best Collaboration | "Abracadabra" (Rexxie, Naira Marley & Skiibii featuring Wizkid) | Nominated | |
| African Entertainment Awards USA | 2023 | Best Music Video | "Abracadabra" (Rexxie, Naira Marley & Skiibii featuring Wizkid) | Nominated | |
| African Entertainment Awards USA | 2024 | Best Male Artist | Himself | Won | |
| African Entertainment Awards USA | 2024 | Artist of the Year | Himself | Nominated | |
| African Entertainment Awards USA | 2025 | Best Male Artist | Himself | Won | |
| African Entertainment Awards USA | 2025 | Artist of the Year | Himself | Nominated | |
| African Entertainment Awards USA | 2025 | Best Music Video | "Dyamite" (Tyla featuring Wizkid) | Nominated | |
| African Entertainment Awards USA | 2025 | Best Music Video | "MMS" (Asak featuring Wizkid) | Won | |
| African Muzik Magazine Awards | 2014 | Best Male West Africa | Himself | Nominated | |
| African Muzik Magazine Awards | 2014 | Artist of the Year | Himself | Nominated | |
| African Muzik Magazine Awards | 2014 | Song of the Year | "Caro" (Star Boy featuring L.A.X and Wizkid) | Nominated | |
| African Muzik Magazine Awards | 2014 | Best Collabo | "Slow Down" (R2Bees featuring Wizkid) | Nominated | |
| African Muzik Magazine Awards | 2014 | Best Collabo | "Surulere Remix" (Dr SID featuring Don Jazzy, Phyno, and Wizkid) | Nominated | |
| African Muzik Magazine Awards | 2015 | Best Male Abass West Africa | Himself | Nominated | |
| African Muzik Magazine Awards | 2015 | Artist of the Year | Himself | Nominated | |
| African Muzik Magazine Awards | 2015 | Song of the Year | "Ojuelegba" | Won | |
| African Muzik Magazine Awards | 2015 | Best Video | "Ojuelegba" | Won | |
| AFRIMA | 2015 | Artist of the Year | Himself | Nominated | |
| AFRIMA | 2015 | Best Male Artist in West Africa | Himself | Nominated | |
| AFRIMA | 2015 | Songwriter of the Year | Himself | Nominated | |
| AFRIMA | 2015 | Album of the Year | "Ayo" | Nominated | |
| AFRIMA | 2015 | Song of the Year | "Ojuelegba" | Nominated | |
| AFRIMA | 2017 | Artiste of the Year | Himself | Won | |
| AFRIMA | 2017 | Best West African Artiste | Himself | Won | |
| AFRIMA | 2017 | Song of the year | "Come Closer" (featuring Drake) | Won | |
| AFRIMA | 2019 | Song of The Year | "Fever" | Won | |
| AFRIMA | 2019 | Collaboration of The Year | "Brown Skin Girl" (Beyoncé featuring Wizkid & Saint Jhn) | Nominated | |
| AFRIMA | 2019 | Best Male West Africa | Himself | Nominated | |
| AFRIMA | 2019 | Crossing Boundaries with Music Award | Himself | Nominated | |
| AFRIMA | 2019 | Artist of The Year | Himself | Nominated | |
| AFRIMA | 2021 | Artiste of the Year in Africa | Himself | Won | |
| AFRIMA | 2021 | Best Male Artiste in Western Africa | Himself | Nominated | |
| AFRIMA | 2021 | Best Artiste, Duo or Group in African R&B/Soul. | Himself | Nominated | |
| AFRIMA | 2021 | Album of the Year | "Essence" (featuring Tems) | Nominated | |
| AFRIMA | 2021 | Best African Collaboration | "Essence" (featuring Tems) | Won | |
| AFRIMA | 2021 | Song of the Year in Africa | "Essence" (featuring Tems) | Won | |
| AFRIMA | 2022 | Best Male Artiste in West Africa | Himself | Nominated | |
| AFRIMA | 2023 | Best Male Artiste in West Africa | Himself | Won | |
| African Pride Awards | 2016 | African Artist of the year | Himself | Won | |
| American Music Awards | 2016 | Favorite Pop/Rock Song | "One Dance" (Drake featuring Kyla) | Nominated | |
| American Music Awards | 2016 | Favorite Soul/R&B Song | "One Dance" (Drake featuring Kyla) | Nominated | |
| American Music Awards | 2016 | Collaboration of the Year | "One Dance" (Drake featuring Kyla) | Nominated | |
| American Music Awards | 2026 | Best Afrobeats Artist | Himself | Pending | |
| Apple Music Awards | 2021 | Artist of the Year (Africa) | Himself | Won | |
| BET Awards | 2012 | Best International Act Africa | Himself | Won | |
| BET Awards | 2016 | Best International Act Africa | Himself | Nominated | |
| BET Awards | 2017 | Best International Act Africa | Himself | Won | |
| BET Awards | 2020 | HER Award | "Brown Skin Girl" (Beyoncé featuring Wizkid & Saint Jhn) | Won | |
| BET Awards | 2021 | Best International Act | Himself | Nominated | |
| BET Awards | 2022 | Best Male R&B/Pop Artist | Himself | Nominated | |
| BET Awards | 2022 | Best Collaboration | "Essence" (feat. Justin Bieber and Tems) | Won | |
| BET Awards | 2023 | Best Collaboration | "Call Me Every Day" (Chris Brown featuring Wizkid ) | Nominated | |
| BET Hip Hop Awards | 2016 | Best Collab, Duo, or Group | "One Dance" (Drake featuring Kyla) | Nominated | |
| Billboard Music Awards | 2016 | Top Hot 100 Song | "One Dance" (Drake featuring Kyla) | Nominated | |
| Billboard Music Awards | 2016 | Top Selling Song | "One Dance" (Drake featuring Kyla) | Nominated | |
| Billboard Music Awards | 2016 | Top Radio Song | "One Dance" (Drake featuring Kyla) | Nominated | |
| Billboard Music Awards | 2016 | Top Streaming Song (Audio) | "One Dance" (Drake featuring Kyla) | Won | |
| Billboard Music Awards | 2016 | Top Collaboration | "One Dance" (Drake featuring Kyla) | Nominated | |
| Billboard Music Awards | 2016 | Top R&B Song | "One Dance" (Drake featuring Kyla) | Won | |
| Billboard Music Awards | 2016 | Top R&B Collaboration | "One Dance" (Drake featuring Kyla) | Won | |
| BreakTudo Awards | 2020 | Global Artist | Himself | Nominated | |
| Channel O Music Video Awards | 2011 | Most Gifted Newcomer Video | "Holla at Your Boy" | Nominated | |
| Channel O Music Video Awards | 2011 | Most Gifted Video of the Year | "Molowo Noni" (Samklef featuring Wizkid, D'Prince, and Ice Prince) | Nominated | |
| Channel O Music Video Awards | 2012 | Most Gifted West African Video of the Year | "Pakurumo" | Nominated | |
| Channel O Music Video Awards | 2013 | Most Gifted Duo/Group/Featuring Video | "Baddest Boy" (EME featuring Wizkid, Skales, and Banky W.) | Nominated | |
| Channel O Music Video Awards | 2013 | Most Gifted Male Video | "Azonto" | Nominated | |
| Channel O Music Video Awards | 2013 | Most Gifted Video of the Year | "Azonto" | Won | |
| Channel O Music Video Awards | 2014 | Most Gifted Duo/Group or Featuring | "Slow Down" (R2Bees featuring Wizkid) | Nominated | |
| Channel O Music Video Awards | 2014 | Most Gifted Duo/Group or Featuring | "Pull Over" (KCee featuring Wizkid) | Won | |
| Channel O Music Video Awards | 2014 | Most Gifted Ragga Dancehall | "Bad Girl" (Jesse Jagz featuring Wizkid) | Nominated | |
| City People Entertainment Awards | 2011 | Best New Male Artiste | Himself | Won | |
| City People Entertainment Awards | 2013 | Musician of the Year (Male) | Himself | Won | |
| City People Entertainment Awards | 2013 | Best Hip-Hop Artiste of the Year | Himself | Nominated | |
| City People Entertainment Awards | 2013 | Best Collabo of the Year | "Fine Lady" (Lynxxx featuring Wizkid) | Nominated | |
| City People Entertainment Awards | 2014 | Musician of the Year (Male) | Himself | Nominated | |
| City People Entertainment Awards | 2014 | Most Popular Song of the Year | "On Top Your Matter" | Nominated | |
| City People Entertainment Awards | 2014 | Best Collabo of the Year | "Pull Over" (KCee featuring Wizkid) | Nominated | |
| Future Awards | 2012 | Musician of the Year | Himself | Won | |
| Dynamix All Youth Awards | 2010 | Promising Artiste of the Year | Himself | Won | |
| Dynamix All Youth Awards | 2010 | Song of the Year | "Holla at Your Boy" | Nominated | |
| Dynamix All Youth Awards | 2011 | Artiste of the Year | Himself | Won | |
| Ghana Music Awards | 2012 | African Artist of the Year | Himself | Nominated | |
| Ghana Music Awards | 2013 | African Artist of the Year | Himself | Won | |
| Ghana Music Awards | 2013 | Reggae Dance Hall Song of the Year | "Time Bomb" (Samini featuring Wizkid) | Nominated | |
| Ghana Music Awards | 2014 | African Artiste of the Year | Himself | Nominated | |
| Ghana Music Awards | 2014 | Afro Pop Song of the Year | "Slow Down" (R2Bees featuring Wizkid) | Nominated | |
| Ghana Music Awards | 2014 | Best Collaboration of the Year | "Slow Down" (R2Bees featuring Wizkid) | Nominated | |
| Ghana Music Awards | 2014 | Vodafone Song of the Year | "Slow Down" (R2Bees featuring Wizkid) | Nominated | |
| Ghana Music Awards | 2016 | African Artist of the Year | Himself | Won | |
| Ghana Music Awards | 2019 | African Artist of the Year | Himself | Nominated | |
| Ghana Music Awards | 2019 | Afropop Song of the Year | "Tokyo" (King Promise featuring Wizkid) | Nominated | |
| Ghana Music Awards | 2019 | Best African Collabo | "Tokyo" (King Promise featuring Wizkid) | Nominated | |
| Ghana Music Awards | 2021 | African Artist of the Year | Himself | Nominated | |
| Grammy Awards | 2016 | Album of the Year | Views (as a featured artist) | Nominated | |
| Grammy Awards | 2021 | Best Music Video | "Brown Skin Girl" (Beyoncé featuring Wizkid, Saint Jhn & Blue Ivy Carter) | Won | |
| Grammy Awards | 2022 | Best Global Music Album | Made in Lagos Deluxe Edition | Nominated | |
| Grammy Awards | 2022 | Best Global Music Performance | "Essence" (featuring Tems) | Nominated | |
| Grammy Awards | 2025 | Best African Music Performance | "MMS" (with Asake) | Nominated | |
| Grammy Awards | 2026 | Best African Music Performance | "Gimme Dat" (with Ayra Starr) | Nominated | |
| iHeartRadio Much Music Video Awards | 2017 | Canadian Single of the Year | "One Dance" (Drake featuring Kyla) | Won | |
| iHeartRadio Music Awards | 2017 | Most Thumbed-Up Song of the Year | "One Dance"(Drake featuring Kyla) | Won | |
| iHeartRadio Music Awards | 2017 | Song of the Year | "One Dance"(Drake featuring Kyla) | Nominated | |
| iHeartRadio Music Awards | 2017 | Hip-Hop Song of the Year | "One Dance"(Drake featuring Kyla) | Won | |
| iHeartRadio Music Awards | 2023 | Afrobeats Artist of the Year | Himself & Tems | Won | |
| iHeartRadio Music Awards | 2024 | Afrobeats Artist of the Year | Himself | Nominated | |
| iHeartRadio Titanium Award | 2023 | 1 Billion Total Audience Spins on iHeartRadio Stations | "Essence" ft TEMS | Won | |
| Juno Awards | 2017 | Single of the Year | "One Dance" (Drake featuring Kyla) | Nominated | |
| Latin American Music Awards | 2016 | Favorite Crossover Song | "One Dance" (Drake featuring Kyla) | Nominated | |
| LOS40 Music Awards | 2016 | International Song of the Year | "One Dance" (Drake featuring Kyla) | Nominated | |
| MOBO awards | 2011 | Best African Act | Himself | Won | |
| MOBO awards | 2013 | Best African Act | Himself | Nominated | |
| MOBO awards | 2014 | Best African Act | Himself | Nominated | |
| MOBO awards | 2015 | Best African Act | Himself | Nominated | |
| MOBO awards | 2017 | Best International Act | Himself | Won | |
| MOBO awards | 2020 | Best African Act | Himself | Won | |
| MOBO awards | 2021 | Best African Act | Himself | Won | |
| MOBO awards | 2021 | Best International Act | Himself | Won | |
| MOBO awards | 2023 | Best African Act | Himself | Nominated | |
| MOBO awards | 2026 | Best African Act | Himself | Pending | |
| MTV Africa Music Awards | 2014 | Best Male | Himself | Nominated | |
| MTV Africa Music Awards | 2014 | Best Collaboration | "Slow Down" (R2Bees featuring Wizkid) | Nominated | |
| MTV Africa Music Awards | 2015 | Best Male | Himself | Nominated | |
| MTV Africa Music Awards | 2015 | Song of the Year | "Show You The Money" | Nominated | |
| MTV Africa Music Awards | 2021 | Best Male | Himself | Pending | |
| MTV Africa Music Awards | 2021 | Best Fanbase | Himself | Pending | |
| MTV Africa Music Awards | 2021 | Best Collaboration | "Smile" (H.E.R. featuring Wizkid) | Pending | |
| MTV Europe Music Awards | 2011 | Best African Act | Himself | Nominated | |
| MTV Europe Music Awards | 2012 | Best African Act | Himself | Nominated | |
| MTV Europe Music Awards | 2013 | Best African Act | Himself | Nominated | |
| MTV Europe Music Awards | 2016 | Best African Act | Himself | Nominated | |
| MTV Europe Music Awards | 2016 | Best Worldwide Act | Himself | Won | |
| MTV Europe Music Awards | 2021 | Best African Act | Himself | Won | |
| MTV Video Music Awards | 2016 | Song of Summer | "One Dance" (Drake featuring Kyla) | Nominated | |
| MTV Video Music Awards | 2021 | Best R&B Video | "Brown Skin Girl" (Beyoncé featuring Wizkid & Saint Jhn) | Nominated | |
| MTV Video Music Awards | 2023 | Best Afrobeats Video | "2 Sugar" (feat. Ayra Starr) | Nominated | |
| MTV Video Music Awards | 2025 | Best Afrobeats Video | "Piece of My Heart" (feat. Brent Faiyaz) | Nominated | |
| Net Honours | 2021 | Most Searched Musician | Himself | Nominated | |
| Net Honours | 2021 | Most Popular Musician | Himself | Won | |
| Net Honours | 2021 | Most Played RnB Song | "Smile" (featuring H.E.R) | Nominated | |
| Net Honours | 2021 | Most Played RnB Song | "Pami" (DJ Tunez featuring Wizkid Adekunle Gold & Omah Lay) | Nominated | |
| NAACP Image Awards | 2020 | Outstanding Duo or Group | "Brown Skin Girl" (Beyoncé featuring Wizkid & Saint Jhn) | Won | |
| NAACP Image Awards | 2021 | Outstanding Music Video | "Brown Skin Girl" (Beyoncé featuring Wizkid & Saint Jhn) | Won | |
| NAACP Image Awards | 2022 | Outstanding International Song | “Essence” (featuring Tems and Justin Bieber) | Won | |
| NAACP Image Awards | 2022 | Outstanding Music Video/Visual Album | “Essence” (featuring Tems and Justin Bieber) | Won | |
| NAACP Image Awards | 2023 | Outstanding Duo, Group or Collaboration (Contemporary) | “Call Me Every Day” (featuring Chris Brown) | Won | |
| NAACP Image Awards | 2023 | Outstanding International Song | "Bad to Me" | Nominated | |
| NAACP Image Awards | 2025 | Outstanding Duo, Group or Collaboration (Contemporary) | "Piece of My Heart" (featuring Brent Faiyaz) | Won | |
| NAACP Image Awards | 2025 | Outstanding International Song | "Piece of My Heart" (featuring Brent Faiyaz) | Nominated | |
| Nigeria Entertainment Awards | 2011 | Hottest Single of The Year | "Tease Me/Bad Guys" | Nominated | |
| Nigeria Entertainment Awards | 2011 | Best New Act of the Year | Himself | Won | |
| Nigeria Entertainment Awards | 2011 | Best Pop/R&B Artist of the Year | Himself | Nominated | |
| Nigeria Entertainment Awards | 2012 | Best Album of the Year | Superstar | Won | |
| Nigeria Entertainment Awards | 2012 | Best Pop/R&B Artist of the Year | Himself | Won | |
| Nigeria Entertainment Awards | 2012 | Hottest Single of the Year | "Pakurumo" | Nominated | |
| Nigeria Entertainment Awards | 2012 | Best Music Video of the Year | "Pakurumo" | Nominated | |
| Nigeria Entertainment Awards | 2012 | Best Collabo of the Year | "Girl" (Bracket featuring Wizkid) | Nominated | |
| Nigeria Entertainment Awards | 2012 | Best Collabo of the Year | "Familiarity" (Jayru featuring Wizkid) | Nominated | |
| Nigeria Entertainment Awards | 2013 | Hottest Single of the Year | "Beat of Life (Samba)" (Sarz featuring Wizkid) | Nominated | |
| Nigeria Entertainment Awards | 2013 | Best Pop/R&B Artist of the Year | Himself | Nominated | |
| Nigeria Entertainment Awards | 2014 | Hottest Single of the Year | "Pull Over" (KCee featuring Wizkid) | Won | |
| Nigeria Entertainment Awards | 2014 | Hottest Single of the Year | "Caro" (Star Boy featuring L.A.X and Wizkid) | Nominated | |
| Nigeria Entertainment Awards | 2014 | Male Artist of the Year | Himself | Nominated | |
| Nigeria Entertainment Awards | 2014 | Best Music Video of the Year (Artist & Director) | "Jaiye Jaiye" (alongside Sesan) | Nominated | |
| Nigeria Entertainment Awards | 2015 | Male Artist of the Year | Himself | Won | |
| Nigeria Entertainment Awards | 2015 | Best Pop Artist of the Year | Himself | Nominated | |
| Nigeria Entertainment Awards | 2015 | Best Dance/Live Performance | Himself | Nominated | |
| Nigeria Entertainment Awards | 2015 | Hottest Single of The Year | "Ojuelegba" | Won | |
| Nigeria Entertainment Awards | 2015 | Album of the Year | Ayo | Nominated | |
| Nigeria Entertainment Awards | 2016 | Hottest Single of the Year | "Baba Nla" | Nominated | |
| Nigeria Entertainment Awards | 2016 | Disk Jockey Collaboration of the Year | "Feeling the Beat"" (DJ Jimmy Jatt ft. Wizkid) | Nominated | |
| Nigeria Entertainment Awards | 2016 | Afropop Artist of the Year | Himself | Nominated | |
| Nigeria Entertainment Awards | 2017 | Hottest Single of the Year | "Come closer" (Wizkid ft. Drake) | Nominated | |
| Nigeria Entertainment Awards | 2018 | Hottest Single of the Year | "Soco" | Nominated | |
| Nigeria Entertainment Awards | 2018 | Afropop Male Artist of the Year | Himself | Nominated | |
| Nigeria Music Video Awards | 2011 | Best Afro Pop Video | "Holla at Your Boy" | Nominated | |
| Nigeria Music Video Awards | 2013 | Best Use of Visual Effects | "Sexy Mama" (Iyanya featuring Wizkid) | Nominated | |
| Nigeria Music Video Awards | 2013 | Best Afro Beat Video | "Caro" (Starboy featuring L.A.X and Wizkid) | Nominated | |
| People's Choice Awards | 2017 | Favorite Song | "One Dance" (Drake featuring Kyla) | Nominated | |
| Soul Train Music Awards | 2016 | The Ashford & Simpson Songwriter's Award | "One Dance" (Drake featuring Kyla) | Nominated | |
| Soul Train Music Awards | 2017 | Best Dance Performance | "Come Closer" (featuring Drake) | Nominated | |
| Soul Train Music Awards | 2019 | Best collaboration | "Brown Skin Girl" (Beyoncé featuring Wizkid & Saint Jhn) | Nominated | |
| Soul Train Music Awards | 2019 | The Ashford & Simpson Songwriter's Award | "Brown Skin Girl" (Beyoncé featuring Wizkid & Saint Jhn) | Won | |
| Soul Train Music Awards | 2020 | Video of the Year | "Brown Skin Girl" (Beyoncé featuring Wizkid & Saint Jhn) | Won | |
| Soul Train Music Awards | 2021 | Best Collaboration | "Essence" (featuring Tems) | Won | |
| Soul Train Music Awards | 2021 | Video of the Year | "Essence" (featuring Tems) | Nominated | |
| Soul Train Music Awards | 2021 | Song of the Year | "Essence" (featuring Tems) | Nominated | |
| Soul Train Music Awards | 2021 | The Ashford & Simpson Songwriter's Award | "Essence" (featuring Tems) | Nominated | |
| Soul Train Music Awards | 2022 | Best Dance Performance | "Call Me Every Day" ([feat. Chris Brown) | Nominated | |
| Soul Train Music Awards | 2022 | Best Collaboration | "Call Me Every Day" ([feat. Chris Brown) | Nominated | |
| Soundcity MVP Awards | 2016 | Artist of the Year | Himself | Won | |
| Soundcity MVP Awards | 2016 | Best Male | Himself | Won | |
| Soundcity MVP Awards | 2016 | Best Pop | Himself | Nominated | |
| Soundcity MVP Awards | 2016 | Digital Artist of the Year | Himself | Nominated | |
| Soundcity MVP Awards | 2016 | Best Collaboration | "Roll Up" (Emtee featuring Wizkid & Aka) | Nominated | |
| Soundcity MVP Awards | 2016 | Song of the Year | "Roll Up" (Emtee featuring Wizkid & Aka) | Nominated | |
| Soundcity MVP Awards | 2016 | Best Collaboration | "Soweto Baby" (DJ Maphorisa featuring Wizkid & Bucks) | Nominated | |
| Soundcity MVP Awards | 2016 | Song of the Year | "Soweto Baby" (DJ Maphorisa featuring Wizkid & Bucks) | Nominated | |
| Soundcity MVP Awards | 2016 | Video of the Year | "Babanla" | Nominated | |
| Soundcity MVP Awards | 2016 | Song of the Year | "Babanla" | Nominated | |
| Soundcity MVP Awards | 2016 | Viewer's Choice Award | "Babanla" | Nominated | |
| Soundcity MVP Awards | 2016 | Listener's Choice Award | "Babanla" | Nominated | |
| Soundcity MVP Awards | 2016 | Listener's Choice Award | "Lagos to Kampala" (Runtown featuring Wizkid) | Nominated | |
| Soundcity MVP Awards | 2017 | Artist of the Year | Himself | Nominated | |
| Soundcity MVP Awards | 2017 | Best Male | Himself | Nominated | |
| Soundcity MVP Awards | 2017 | Digital Artist of the Year | Himself | Won | |
| Soundcity MVP Awards | 2017 | Song of the Year | "Come Closer" ( Drake featuring Wizkid) | Nominated | |
| Soundcity MVP Awards | 2017 | Video of the Year | "Come Closer" ( Drake featuring Wizkid) | Nominated | |
| Soundcity MVP Awards | 2017 | Video of the Year | "Ma Lo" (Tiwa Savage featuring Wizkid) | Nominated | |
| Soundcity MVP Awards | 2017 | Best Collaboration | "Ma Lo" (Tiwa Savage featuring Wizkid) | Nominated | |
| Soundcity MVP Awards | 2017 | Best Collaboration | "Tonight" ( R2Bees featuring Wizkid) | Nominated | |
| Soundcity MVP Awards | 2019 | Artist of the Year | Himself | Nominated | |
| Soundcity MVP Awards | 2019 | Best Male | Himself | Nominated | |
| Soundcity MVP Awards | 2019 | Best Pop | Himself | Nominated | |
| Soundcity MVP Awards | 2019 | Digital Artist of the Year | Himself | Nominated | |
| Soundcity MVP Awards | 2019 | Listener's Choice Award | "Fake Love" (Starboy featuring Duncan Mighty & Wizkid) | Nominated | |
| Soundcity MVP Awards | 2019 | Best Collaboration | "Fake Love" (Starboy featuring Duncan Mighty & Wizkid) | Nominated | |
| Soundcity MVP Awards | 2019 | Best Collaboration | "Soco" ( Duncan Mighty featuring Wizkid) | Won | |
| Soundcity MVP Awards | 2019 | Viewer's Choice Award | "Soco" ( Duncan Mighty featuring Wizkid) | Nominated | |
| Soundcity MVP Awards | 2019 | Viewer's Choice Award | "Fever" | Nominated | |
| Soundcity MVP Awards | 2019 | Video of the Year | "Fever" | Nominated | |
| Soundcity MVP Awards | 2020 | Artist of the Year | Himself | Nominated | |
| Soundcity MVP Awards | 2020 | Best Male | Himself | Nominated | |
| Soundcity MVP Awards | 2020 | Digital Artist of the Year | Himself | Nominated | |
| Teen Choice Awards | 2016 | Choice Music: R&B/Hip-Hop Song | "One Dance" (Drake featuring Kyla) | Won | |
| The Headies | 2011 | Best Pop Single | "Holla at Your Boy" | Nominated | |
| The Headies | 2011 | Next Rated | "Holla at Your Boy" | Won | |
| The Headies | 2012 | Artist of the Year | Himself | Won | |
| The Headies | 2012 | Hip Hop World Revelation of the Year | Himself | Won | |
| The Headies | 2012 | Album of the Year | Superstar | Nominated | |
| The Headies | 2013 | Artiste of the Year | Himself | Nominated | |
| The Headies | 2013 | Best Music Video | "Azonto" | Nominated | |
| The Headies | 2013 | Best Collabo | "Baddest Boy" (EME featuring Wizkid, Skales, and Banky W.) | Nominated | |
| The Headies | 2014 | Artiste of the Year | Himself | Nominated | |
| The Headies | 2014 | Best Pop Single | "Pull Over" (Kcee featuring Wizkid) | Nominated | |
| The Headies | 2014 | Best Pop Single | "Caro" (Starboy featuring L.A.X and Wizkid) | Nominated | |
| The Headies | 2014 | Best Reggae/Dancehall Single | "Bad Girl" (Jesse Jagz featuring Wizkid) | Nominated | |
| The Headies | 2015 | Best Pop Single | "Ojuelegba" | Nominated | |
| The Headies | 2015 | Best Recording of The Year | "Ojuelegba" | Nominated | |
| The Headies | 2015 | Song of The Year | "Ojuelegba" | Won | |
| The Headies | 2015 | Best R&B Single | "Say You Love Me" (Leriq featuring Wizkid) | Nominated | |
| The Headies | 2015 | Best Collabo | "Sisi" (Praiz featuring Wizkid) | Nominated | |
| The Headies | 2015 | Best R&B/Pop Album | Ayo | Won | |
| The Headies | 2015 | Album of the Year | Ayo | Nominated | |
| The Headies | 2015 | Artiste of The Year | Himself | Nominated | |
| The Headies | 2015 | Best Pop Single | "Ojuelegba" | Nominated | |
| The Headies | 2015 | Best Recording of The Year | "Ojuelegba" | Nominated | |
| The Headies | 2015 | Song of The Year | "Ojuelegba" | Won | |
| The Headies | 2015 | Best R&B Single | "Say You Love Me" (Leriq featuring Wizkid) | Nominated | |
| The Headies | 2015 | Best Collabo | "Sisi" (Praiz featuring Wizkid) | Nominated | |
| The Headies | 2015 | Best R&B/Pop Album | Ayo | Won | |
| The Headies | 2015 | Album of the Year | Ayo | Nominated | |
| The Headies | 2015 | Artiste of The Year | Himself | Nominated | |
| The Headies | 2016 | Best Pop Single | Final (Baba Nla)" (Drake featuring Wizkid) | Nominated | |
| The Headies | 2016 | Song of the Year | Final (Baba Nla)" (Drake featuring Wizkid) | Nominated | |
| The Headies | 2016 | Artiste of The Year | Himself | Won | |
| The Headies | 2018 | Best Collabo | "Come Closer" (Drake featuring Wizkid) | Nominated | |
| The Headies | 2018 | Best Reggae/Dancehall Single | "Come Closer" (Drake featuring Wizkid) | Nominated | |
| The Headies | 2018 | Best Music Video | "Come Closer" (Drake featuring Wizkid) | Won | |
| The Headies | 2018 | Viewer's Choice Award | "Come Closer" (Drake featuring Wizkid) | Won | |
| The Headies | 2018 | Best Collabo | "Ma Lo" ( Tiwa Savage featuring Wizkid) | Won | |
| The Headies | 2018 | Best Music Video | "Ma Lo" ( Tiwa Savage featuring Wizkid) | Nominated | |
| The Headies | 2018 | Album of the Year | Sounds from the Other Side | Nominated | |
| The Headies | 2018 | Best R&B/Pop Album | Sounds from the Other Side | Won | |
| The Headies | 2018 | Artiste of The Year | Himself | Nominated | |
| The Headies | 2019 | Best Pop Single | "Fake Love" (Starboy featuring Duncan Mighty & Wizkid) | Nominated | |
| The Headies | 2019 | Best Collabo | "Fake Love" (Starboy featuring Duncan Mighty & Wizkid) | Nominated | |
| The Headies | 2019 | Song of The Year | "Fake Love" (Starboy featuring Duncan Mighty & Wizkid) | Nominated | |
| The Headies | 2019 | Artiste of The Year | Himself | Nominated | |
| The Headies | 2019 | Viewer's Choice Award | Himself | Nominated | |
| The Headies | 2020 | Best Pop Single | "Joro" | Nominated | |
| The Headies | 2020 | Song of The Year | "Joro" | Nominated | |
| The Headies | 2020 | Best Recording of The Year | "Smile" (H.E.R. featuring Wizkid) | Nominated | |
| The Headies | 2020 | Best Music Video | "Smile" (H.E.R. featuring Wizkid) | Nominated | |
| The Headies | 2020 | Best Collabo | "Totori" (ID Cabasa featuring Wizkid) | Nominated | |
| The Headies | 2020 | Artiste of The Year | Himself | Won | |
| The Headies | 2020 | Viewer's Choice Award | Himself | Won | |
| The Headies | 2022 | Best Recording of the Year | "Essence" (featuring Tems) | Nominated | |
| The Headies | 2022 | Song of the Year | "Essence" (featuring Tems) | Won | |
| The Headies | 2022 | Best R&B Single | "Essence" (featuring Tems) | Won | |
| The Headies | 2022 | Best Collaboration | "Essence" (featuring Tems) | Won | |
| The Headies | 2022 | Viewer's Choice Award | "Essence" (featuring Tems) | Nominated | |
| The Headies | 2022 | Best Music Video | "Ginger" (featuring Burna Boy) | Nominated | |
| The Headies | 2022 | Best Afrobeats Album | Made In Lagos (Deluxe Edition) | Won | |
| The Headies | 2022 | Album of the Year | Made In Lagos (Deluxe Edition) | Won | |
| The Headies | 2022 | African Artist of the Year | Himself | Nominated | |
| The Headies | 2022 | Best Male Artist | Himself | Nominated | |
| The Headies | 2024 | Best Collaboration | "IDK" (featuring Zlatan) | Nominated | |
| The Headies | 2027 | Song of the Year | "MMS" (with Asake) | Pending | |
| The Headies | 2027 | Afrobeats Single of the Year | "Jogodo" (with Asake) | Pending | |
| The Headies | 2027 | Viewers' Choice Award | "Jogodo" (with Asake) | Pending | |
| The Headies | 2027 | Afrobeats Album of the Year | Morayo | Pending | |
| The Headies | 2027 | Digital Artiste of the Year | Himself | Pending | |
| The Headies | 2027 | Best Male Artiste | Himself | Pending | |
| World Music Awards | 2014 | World's Best Entertainer of the Year | Himself | Nominated | |
| World Music Awards | 2014 | World's Best Live Act | Himself | Nominated | |
| World Music Awards | 2014 | World's Best Male Artist | Himself | Nominated | |
| World Music Awards | 2014 | World's Best Song | "Eledumare" | Nominated | |
| 4Syte TV Music Video Awards | 2011 | Best African Act Video | "Holla at Your Boy" | Nominated | |
| 4Syte TV Music Video Awards | 2012 | Best African Act Video | "Dance for Me" (EME featuring Wizkid) | Nominated | |
| 4Syte TV Music Video Awards | 2013 | Best African Act Video | "Azonto" | Nominated | |
| 4Syte TV Music Video Awards | 2013 | Best Group Video of the Year | "Slow Down" (R2Bees featuring Wizkid) | Won | |
| 4Syte TV Music Video Awards | 2013 | Best Directed Video | "Slow Down" (R2Bees featuring Wizkid) | Nominated | |
| 4Syte TV Music Video Awards | 2013 | Most Popular Video | "Slow Down" (R2Bees featuring Wizkid) | Nominated | |
| 4Syte TV Music Video Awards | 2013 | Most Influential Video | "Slow Down" (R2Bees featuring Wizkid) | Nominated | |
| 4Syte TV Music Video Awards | 2015 | Best African Act Video | "Ojuelegba" | Nominated | |
| 4Syte TV Music Video Awards | 2019 | Best Male Video | "Tokyo" (King Promise featuring Wizkid) | Nominated | |
| 4Syte TV Music Video Awards | 2019 | Best Edit Video | "Tokyo" (King Promise featuring Wizkid) | Nominated | |
| 4Syte TV Music Video Awards | 2019 | Best Collaboration | "Tokyo" (King Promise featuring Wizkid) | Nominated | |
| 4Syte TV Music Video Awards | 2019 | Most Influential Video | "Tokyo" (King Promise featuring Wizkid) | Nominated | |
| 4Syte TV Music Video Awards | 2021 | Best African Act | Himself | Won | |
