= Ojuelegba (disambiguation) =

Ojuelegba may refer to:

- "Ojuelegba" (song), 2014 song by Wizkid
- Ojuelegba, Lagos, a suburb of Lagos, Nigeria
