= 2015 Nigeria Entertainment Awards =

- Date: 6 September 2015
- Location: Skirball Center for the Performing Arts; New York City, New York, U.S.A.
- Country: Nigeria
- Hosted by: Osas Ighodaro; Ice Prince
- Acts: MC Galaxy; Mr 2Kay
- Most awards: Wizkid
- Most nominations: Olamide

The 2015 Nigeria Entertainment Awards was the 10th edition of the Nigeria Entertainment Awards. Wizkid won the most awards while Olamide received the most nominations with three across 39 award categories. Kiss Daniel won the Best New Act to Watch award while Praiz won the Best R&B Act award after he toppled the likes of Banky W, Chidinma, Seyi Shay, Timi Dakolo and Shaydee. The award was held at the Skirball Center for the Performing Arts, New York City, U.S.A. and was hosted by Osas Ighodaro and Ice Prince.

== Winners and nominees ==
Below is the list of nominees and winners for the popular music categories. Winners are highlighted in bold.

=== Musical categories ===
==== Hottest Single of The Year ====
- **"Ojuelegba – Wizkid"**
  - "Woju" – Kiss Daniel
  - "Shoki Remix" – Lil Kesh, Olamide, Davido
  - "Godwin" – Korede Bello
  - "Shake Body" – Skales
  - "Dorobucci" – The Mavins

==== Best New Act to Watch ====
- **Kiss Daniel**
  - Di'Ja
  - CDQ
  - Korede Bello
  - Lil Kesh
  - Ayo Jay
  - Falz

==== Gospel Artist of The Year ====
- **Tope Alabi**
  - Obiwon
  - Eben
  - Nathaniel Bassey
  - Psalm Ebube
  - Onos Ariyo
  - Flo

==== Indigenous Artist of the Year ====
- **Pasuma**
  - Olamide
  - Phyno
  - Flavour N'abania
  - MC Galaxy
  - Jaywon

==== Best R&B Artist of the Year ====
- **Praiz**
  - Banky W
  - Chidinma
  - Seyi Shay
  - Timi Dakolo
  - Shaydee

==== Best Pop Artist of the Year ====
- **Davido**
  - Sean Tizzle
  - Presh
  - Wizkid
  - Runtown
  - Burna Boy

==== Female Artist of the Year ====
- **Yemi Alade**
  - Aramide
  - Seyi Shay
  - Cynthia Morgan
  - Di'Ja
  - Eva Alordiah

==== Male Artist of the Year ====
- **Wizkid**
  - Olamide
  - Skales
  - Flavour N'abania
  - Davido
  - Patoranking

==== Best Rap Act of the Year ====
- **Olamide**
  - Reminisce
  - Ice Prince
  - Phyno
  - Falz
  - M.I

==== Music Producer of the Year ====
- **Shizzi**
  - Pheelz
  - Legendury Beatz
  - Young Jonn
  - DJ Coublon
  - T Spize

==== Best Music Video of the Year (Artist and Director) ====
- **"Awww" – Di'Ja and Unlimited LA**
  - "Ibadan" – QDot featuring Olamide) and HG2 Films
  - "Condo" – YCEE featuring Patoranking and Clarence Peters
  - "Shuga" – Eva and Woltrk Ent & Radioactiiv
  - "Onye" – Waje featuring Tiwa Savage and Kemi Adetiba
  - "Crazy" – Seyi Shay and Meji Alabi & JM Films

==== Most Promising Act to Watch ====
- **Simi**
  - Danagog
  - Niniola
  - TJan
  - Tonye
  - Pere Carter
  - Sunkanmi
  - TeeGee Da Unusual

==== Diaspora Artist of the Year ====
- **Stylezz**
  - Bils
  - Jay Cube
  - Emmy Gee
  - Moelogo
  - Lioness

==== African Artist of the Year (Non-Nigerian) ====
- **Eddy Kenzo**
  - Diamond Platnumz
  - Sauti Sol
  - Sarkodie
  - Stonebwoy
  - AKA
  - MzVee

==== Afrobeat Artist of the Year ====
- **2face Idibia**
  - Lagbaja
  - Femi Kuti
  - Seun Kuti
  - Tony Oladipo Allen
  - Ara

==== Best Dance/Live Performance ====
- **MC Galaxy**
  - Yemi Alade
  - P-Square
  - Omawumi
  - Wizkid
  - Olamide

==== Album of the Year ====
- **Thankful – Flavour N'abania**
  - Baba Hafusa – Reminisce
  - Street OT – Olamide
  - King of Queens – Yemi Alade
  - Ayo – Wizkid
  - Rich & Famous – Praiz

==== Best Collabo of the Year ====
- **"Bad Girl Remix" – Mr 2Kay featuring Seyi Shay & Cynthia Morgan**
  - "Indomie Remix" – Masterkraft featuring CDQ & Davido
  - "Shoki" – Lil Kesh featuring Davido & Olamide
  - "Collabo" – P-Square featuring Don Jazzy
  - "Condo" – Ycee featuring Patoranking
  - "Marry Me" – Falz featuring Yemi Alade & Poe

=== Film categories ===
==== Actor of the Year (Nollywood) ====
- **Gabriel Afolayan (The Antique)**
  - Kunle Afolayan (October 1)
  - Wole Ojo (Brave)
  - OC Ukeje (Secret Room)
  - Yakubu Mohammed (Dark Closet)
  - Femi Jacobs (The Meeting)

==== Actress of the Year (Nollywood) ====
- **Ruth Kadiri (Matter Arising)**
  - Rita Dominic (The Meeting)
  - Weruche Opia (When Love Happens)
  - Linda Ejiofor (Secret Room)
  - Joke Silva (Folly)
  - Kehinde Bankole (October 1)

==== Film Director of the Year (Nollywood) ====
- **Kunle Afolayan (October 1)**
  - Eneaji Chris (Secret Room)
  - Mildred Okwo (The Meeting
  - DJ Tee & Darasen Richards (The Antique)
  - Stanlee Ohikhuare (Verdict)
  - LowlaDee (Brave)

==== Actor of the Year (Indigenous Films) ====
- **Adekola Odunlade**
  - Obi Emelonye
  - Zubby Micheal
  - Ibikunle Oladipo
  - Jide Kosoko
  - Yakubu Mohammed

==== Actress of the Year (Indigenous Films) ====
- **Toyin Aimakhu (Alakada)**
- Aborisade Abisola (Temiloluwa ATM)
  - Fathia Balogun (Iya Alalake)
  - Halima Fatete (Har da Mijina)
  - Onyekachukwu Okeke (Olanma)
  - Ariyike Akinyanju (Eyinju Eledumare)

==== Film Director of the Year (Indigenous Films) ====
- **Olanrewaju Abiodun**
  - Blessing Adejumo
  - Amechi Ukeje
  - Niji Akanni
  - Okey Zubelu
  - Ugezu J. Ugezu

==== Film of the Year (Indigenous Films) ====
- **Alakada**
  - Ibaje
  - Wazo
  - Eyinju Eledumare
  - Har da Mijina
  - Onye Ozi

==== Film of the Year – Producer (Africa) ====
- **Shattered Romance**
  - Far
  - Devil in the Detail
  - A Letter from Adam
  - Fundi-Mentals

==== Actor of the Year (Africa) ====
- **Majid Michel (Knocking on Heavens Doors)**
  - Adjetey Anang (Devil in the Detail)
  - Gerald Langiri (Fundi-Mentals)
  - James Gardiner (Shattered Romance)

==== Actress of the Year (Africa) ====
- **Sonia Ibrahim**
  - Terry Pheto
  - Joselyn Dumas
  - Lydia Forson
  - Okawa Shaznay

==== Film Director of the Year (Africa) ====
- **Alex Konstantaras**
  - Shirley Frimpong-Manso
  - Eddie Nartey
  - Gilbert Agbor
  - Sam Kessie

==== Actor of the Year (Nigeria in Hollywood) ====
- **Chiwetel Ejiofor**
  - Adewale Akinnuoye-Agbaje
  - David Oyelowo
  - Hakeem Kae Kazeem
  - Gbenga Akinnagbe

==== Actress of the Year (Nigeria in Hollywood) ====
- **Adepero Oduye**
  - Carmen Ejogo
  - Caroline Chikezie
  - Enuka Okuma
