= Collabo (song) =

Single by P-Square featuring Don Jazzy

from the album Double Trouble
- Released: 12 September 2014
- Genre: Afrobeats
- Length: 3:43
- Label: Square Records
- Songwriters: Jude Okoye; Peter Okoye; Paul Okoye
- Producer: Oscar Heman-Ackah

P-Square singles chronology
"Ejeajo" (2014)	"Collabo" (2014)	"Getting Down" (2015)

Don Jazzy singles chronology
"Serve the Lord" (2014)	"Collabo" (2014)	"Arise" (2014)

Music video
- "Collabo" on YouTube

"Collabo" is a song by Nigerian duo P-Square featuring Nigerian singer and record producer Don Jazzy. It was released on 12 September 2014 as the final single from the duo's sixth studio album Double Trouble (2014). Produced by Oscar Heman-Ackah, the song debuted at #7 on the MTV Base Official Naija Top Ten.

== Background ==
In August 2014, Peter Okoye, one-half of P-Square, shared a photo of the duo in the studio with Don Jazzy on Twitter, captioning it, "U don't expect anything less when u see us in dis kitchen with @donjazzy".

== Music video ==
The music video for "Collabo" was shot in Cape Town, South Africa by Jude Okoye and Clarence Peters. Within two weeks of its release, the video surpassed one million views on YouTube. The video received mixed reviews from critics. 360nobs' Henry Igwe said that the video was "easy to watch and relate to" but lacked depth and imagination. Khadijah Thabit of Legit News described the video as a "classy pictorial with a brief comic storyline."

Reviewing for tooXclusive, Jim Donnett called it a "classy picture with beautiful ambiance and the lush looks of a captivating enchantress" and rated it 4/5, Jimmy King said it made the love fantasy idea "fun and enjoyable" and rating it 3.8/5, and Al Yhusuff describing it as "quite entertaining" despite some repeated ideas, rating it 3.7/5.

== Chart performance ==
"Collabo" debuted at number seven on the MTV Base Official Naija Top Ten for the week of 29 April 2015, entering alongside Olamide's "Falila Ketan" and ahead of several established hits. The following week, it rose to number five, as the chart saw new entries from Ice Prince and Sean Tizzle. By the week of 10 May 2015, "Collabo" had dropped to number ten. The song remained on the countdown for several more weeks, eventually exiting the chart by 23 May 2015. On 28 May 2015, it made a brief re-entry at number nine, demonstrating continued listener interest after its initial run. Throughout its chart presence, "Collabo" competed with tracks such as the Mavins' "Looku Looku", Davido's "The Sound", and Patoranking's "Daniella Whine", which occupied the top positions at various points.

== Critical reception ==
In a review of Double Trouble, Music in Africa's Oris Aigbokhaevbolo called "Collabo" the album's highlight and described it as a "sex song covered in the innuendo Don Jazzy perfected with D'Banj." Tola Sarumi of Notjustok found the song catchy and reminiscent of "Dorobucci". In a less enthusiastic review for Jaguda, a reviewer going by the moniker Angry Mob panned "Collabo"'s lyrics, describing it as an "unflattering caricature of all that music should be." Wilfred Okiche of YNaija was more critical about "Collabo", writing that Don Jazzy's presence and ad-libs "do not hurt the highlife influenced number", but argued that P-Square "doesn't need [Don Jazzy]" for a song built on an "obvious title" and "bland lyrics". Adrianna Simwa of Legit News ranked the song #16 on their list of the top 20 P-Square songs of all time, praising the song's "lyrical melody, beautiful voices and gorgeous views."

=== Accolades ===
Year	Award ceremony	Prize	Result	Ref
2015	African Muzik Magazine Awards	Best Collaboration	Nominated	
2015	COSON Song Awards	Best Collabo Song	Nominated	
2015	The Headies	Best Collabo	Nominated	
2015	Nigeria Entertainment Awards	Best Collabo of the Year	Nominated	

== Charts ==
Chart performance for "Collabo"
Chart (2015)	Peak position
Nigeria (MTV Base Official Naija Top Ten)	5
