= Confusion (album) =

1975 studio album by Fela Ransome-Kuti and the Africa 70 band

Studio album by Fela Ransome-Kuti and the Africa 70
- Released: 1975
- Recorded: 1974
- Genre: Afrobeat
- Length: 25:36
- Label: EMI
- Producer: Fela Ransome-Kuti

Fela Kuti chronology
Gentleman (1973)	Confusion (1975)	Expensive Shit (1975)

Confusion is a 1975 album by Nigerian Afrobeat musician Fela Kuti and his Africa 70 band. It was arranged, composed, and produced by Kuti, who recorded the album after choosing to emphasize his African heritage and nationalism in his music. Confusion is a commentary on the confused state of post-colonial Lagos and its lack of infrastructure and proper leadership at the time. Kuti's pidgin English lyrics depict difficult conditions in the city, including a frenetic, multilingual trading market and inextricable traffic jams in Lagos' major intersections.

Confusion is a one-song Afrobeat album that begins with an entirely instrumental first half, which features free form interplay between Kuti's electric piano and drummer Tony Allen. It leads to an extended mid-tempo section with Allen's polyrhythms and tenor saxophone by Kuti, who subsequently delivers call-and-response vocal passages. In reviews since the record's release by EMI, the album was praised by music critics, who found it exemplary of Kuti's Afrobeat style and recommended it as a highlight from his extensive catalog. In both 2000 and 2010, Confusion was reissued and bundled with Kuti's 1973 Gentleman album.

== Background ==
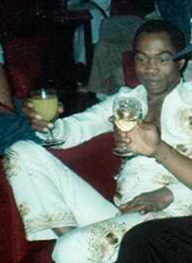
Fela Kuti in 1970

After becoming dissatisfied with studying European composers at the Trinity College of Music in London, Fela Kuti formed his first band Koola Lobitos in 1961 and quickly became a popular act in the local club scene. He returned to his native Nigeria in 1963 and formed another band that played a rhythmic fusion of traditional highlife music and jazz. Kuti dubbed his hybrid style "Afrobeat", which served in part as his critique of African performers who he felt had forsaken their native musical roots for American popular music trends. In 1969, he toured with his band in Los Angeles and was introduced by a friend to the writings of black nationalist and Afrocentrist figures such as Malcolm X and Eldridge Cleaver. Inspired by what he had read, Kuti decided to write more political and critical music, and changed the name of his band to the Nigeria 70 and later the Africa 70.

During the 1970s, Kuti began to emphasize his identification with Africa and its culture in his music and opposed the colonial mentality of identification with Western powers such as the United States and the United Kingdom. His albums during this period expressed aspects of his ideology such as his African heritage and nationalism. On his 1973 song "Eko lie", Kuti declared that the Nigerian city of Lagos was his home rather than London or New York City, where he had performed earlier in his career. Lagos and its landmark events became common themes in his songs. He revisited the theme on Confusion in 1974 to acknowledge that he identifies with the city despite its problems.

== Musical style ==
"Confusion"
A 30-second sample of the bridge during the song's instrumental half

Confusion is a one-song album with a duration of 25 minutes and 36 seconds. The album's first side is entirely instrumental. It begins with a free-form introduction, which musically depicts the disorienting impact of Lagos' problems, according to music scholar Frank Thurmond Fairfax. Although Kuti occasionally used amplified instruments, he rarely employed elaborate electronic effects and instead relied on more natural sounds. Kuti, who plays electric piano, and drummer Tony Allen start the introduction out of tempo and exhibit abstract musical techniques, including dramatic free jazz interplay between their instruments. Although he was known for his critical background in classical study, Kuti allowed Allen to improvise in the Africa 70's rhythm section and viewed him as a drummer with the mind of a composer, or "one who composes on the spot".

The introduction's keyboard fantasia gradually opens the band's languid, expansive interplay. The song's groove is established with the introduction of a bass guitar ostinato at 4:50. Rhythm and tenor guitars and a horn section are played in the next two minutes. During the bridge, Allen's drumming intensifies within the song's seven-minute mark, which leads to a fully developed Afrobeat section; Afrobeat is a type of loose funk music embellished with African syncopation, R&B-styled horn instrumentation, and improvisatory solos. Confusion's extended mid-tempo section has complex arrangements of danceable grooves, multiple solos, and Allen's polyrhythms. In this section, Kuti plays tenor saxophone, which he had learned after the Africa 70's original tenor player, Igo Chico, left in 1973. The music is complemented by his outspoken call-and-response vocal passages. The song's final 10 minutes comprise raucous trumpet, tenor saxophone solos, and Kuti's lead vocals. Its closing section revisits the abstract interplay of the introduction.

== Themes ==
Confusion is a commentary on the confused state of post-colonial, urban Nigeria, particularly Lagos, and its lack of infrastructure and proper leadership during a period of military dictatorship. Kuti's lyrics depict the complicated, frenetic, and multilingual market of the Ojuelegba crossroad, and in doing so addresses what Nigerian historian Toyin Falola described as the "infrastructural nightmare of Lagos and the continued hegemony of the West in all aspects of African life". According to The Rough Guide to World Music (2006), the album uses a "hectic crossroads in Lagos ... as a metaphor to explore the problems of an entire corrupt nation".

In the opening lines, Kuti comments on his social reality: "When we talk say confusion / Everything out of control". His lyrics decry what he viewed as the colonial mindset of some Africans and employ pidgin English, which was the lingua franca of most people in English-speaking West Africa; he sings the phrase "pafuka", which means "all over" or "finished", and the interjection "o" to add emphasis. Kuti makes reference to three dialects and currencies that make trading in urban Nigeria difficult. African Arts journalist E.J. Collins interpreted one of the verses as a reference to the protracted nature of transactions in Lagos. In this verse, Kuti sings:

Dem be three men wey sell for roadside-o
Dem three speak different language-o
Dem speak Lagos, Accra, and Conakry
One white man come pay them money-o
He pay them for pounds, dollars and French money-o
For the thing wey he go buy from them
He remain for them to share am-o
Me I say, na confusion be that-o
He go say he pafuka o.

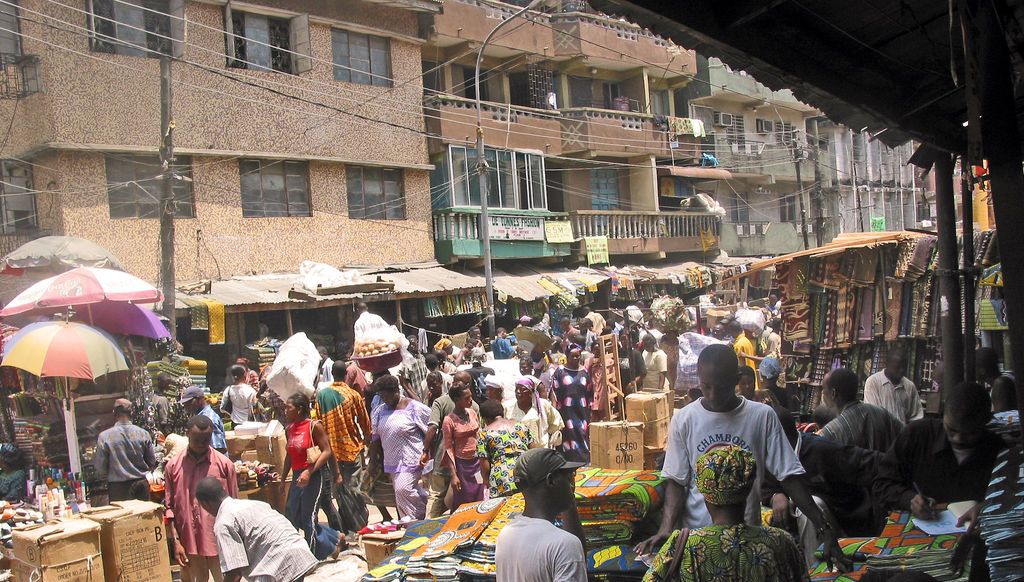
Kuti describes a frenetic trading market in his portrayal of Lagos (local market pictured in 2005).

Kuti uses ironic humor to express pride in Nigerians' ability to drive and work within difficult conditions: "Before-before Lagos traffic na special, eh / Number one special all over the world / You go get Ph.D. for driving for Lagos, eh / You go get M.A. for driving for Lagos, eh / You go get M.Sc. for driving for Lagos, oh / For me for me I like am like that, eh / Ah-ha-ha-ha, na my country – why not? / For me for me I like am like that, eh." He subsequently describes major Lagosian intersections, including Ojuelegba, Surulere, and Ogogoro Centre, which lack the supervision of a traffic officer. They are characterized by aggressive, temperamental drivers, who force their vehicles into inextricable traffic jams: "For Ojuelegba, moto dey come from south / Moto dey come from north / Moto dey come from east / Moto dey come from west / And policeman no dey for centre / Na confusion be that-i o / He go say he pafuka o."

== Release and reception ==
Logo for EMI Records, the album's original distributor

Confusion was first released in Nigeria in 1975 by EMI Records. It was reissued by EMI in 1984. In a retrospective review for AllMusic, Sam Samuelson gave the record five stars and called it "a highly recommended 25-minute Afro-beat epic". He said that it shows Kuti and his band at the peak of their instrumental skills and vague jeers, which he felt became more explicit and intense on 1977's Zombie. Samuelson found Confusion to be exemplary of Kuti's "genius" formula, in which he startles musically enraptured listeners with his commentary. Music journalist Peter Shapiro called it a lyrical masterpiece and said that the bridge following the song's "cosmic" introduction is "pretty much the pinnacle of Afro-futurism". Nic Harcourt recommended Confusion as a starting point for new listeners of Kuti's music.

In 2000, MCA Records re-released and bundled Confusion with Kuti's 1973 album Gentleman. It was the last installment in a 10-CD, 20-album reissue project for Kuti. Rob Brunner of Entertainment Weekly gave the album's reissue an "A" and viewed it as one of Kuti's best works, while Derrick A. Smith from All About Jazz cited Confusion as one of his "best statements on any instrument". In a four-star review, Down Beat praised the musician's combination of "raw energy and sophistication", while saying that the record sounded just as remarkable as when it was first released. Robert Christgau gave the two-album reissue an "A−" in The Village Voice, calling Confusion "one Fela song/track/album it would be a waste to edit ... the proof of Africa 70's presumptive funk." For the annual Pazz & Jop critics poll, he ranked the re-release number 80 on his list of 2000's best albums.

In 2005, Confusion was ranked 91st on New Nation's list of "Top 100 Best Albums by Black Artists". In his 2008 book 1,000 Recordings to Hear Before You Die, music journalist Tom Moon wrote that it is both one of Kuti's best albums and "a demonstration of just how rousing Afro-Beat's deftly interlocked rhythms can be." In 2010, the album was bundled again with Gentleman by Knitting Factory Records as a part of the label's extensive reissue of Kuti's 45-album discography. Michaelangelo Matos of Paste magazine gave it a score of "9.3/10" and cited it as the essential release in the discography: "an oasis in a sandpaper-like catalog."

== Track listing ==
All songs were arranged, composed, and produced by Fela Ransome-Kuti.

Side one
No.	Title	Length
1.	"Confusion Pt. I"	14:08

Side two
No.	Title	Length
1.	"Confusion Pt. II"	11:28

- The album was released as a single track on its subsequent CD reissue.

== Personnel ==
Credits are adapted from the album's liner notes.

- James Abayomi – sticks
- Tony Allen – lead drums, solo drums
- Africa 70 – band
- Lekan Animashaun – baritone saxophone
- George Mark Bruce – bass guitar
- Segun Edo – tenor guitar
- Henry Kofi – first conga
- Daniel Koranteg – second conga
- Tony Njoku – trumpet
- Emmanuel Odenusi – engineering, mixing
- Isaac Olaleye – maracas
- Remi Olowookere – graphics
- Fela Ransome-Kuti – arrangement, tenor saxophone, piano, production, vocals
- Tutu Shoronmu – rhythm guitar

== See also ==
- 1970s in music
- Fela Kuti discography

== Bibliography ==
- Ambrose, Robert (2001). "Confusion and Courage". The Beat. 20. Los Angeles.
- Anon. (1975). Confusion (gatefold LP). Fela Ransome-Kuti and the Africa 70. Nigeria: EMI Records. NEMI (LP) 004.
- Anon. (1984). "Afro Hot 20". Blues & Soul (419). Croydon.
- Anon. (2001). "Review: Confusion/Gentleman". Down Beat (April). Elmhurst.
- Anon. (2005). "Top 100 Best Albums by Black Artists". New Nation. London.
- Broughton, Simon; Ellingham, Mark; Lusk, Jon (2006). The Rough Guide to World Music: Africa & Middle East (3rd ed.). Rough Guides. ISBN 1843535513.
- Brunner, Rob (2 June 2000). "Confusion/Gentleman and Stalemate/Fear Not for Man Review". Entertainment Weekly. No. 543. New York. Archived from the original on 24 December 2013.
- Christgau, Robert (2000). "Shuffering and Shmiling". The Village Voice. No. 20 June. New York. Archived from the original on 24 December 2013.
- Christgau, Robert (2001). "Pazz & Jop 2000: Dean's List". The Village Voice. No. February. New York. Archived from the original on 8 October 2012.
- Collins, E.J. (January 1977). "Post-War Popular Band Music in West Africa". African Arts. 10 (2). Los Angeles: 60. doi:10.2307/3335303. JSTOR 3335303.
- Dougan, John (n.d.). "Fela Kuti". Allmusic. Rovi Corporation. Archived from the original on 1 December 2012.
- Fairfax, Frank Thurmond (1993). Fela, the Afrobeat King: Popular Music and Cultural Revitalization in West Africa. University of Michigan. OCLC 713128918.
- Falola, Toyin; Salm, Steven J. (2005). Urbanization and African Cultures. Carolina Academic Press. ISBN 0890895589.
- Greenberg, Adam (n.d.). "Gentleman/Confusion – Fela Kuti, Fela Ransome-Kuti and the Africa '70 : Songs, Reviews, Credits, Awards". Allmusic. Rovi Corporation. Archived from the original on 13 October 2012.
- Harcourt, Nic (2005). Music Lust: Recommended Listening for Every Mood, Moment, and Reason. Sasquatch Books. ISBN 1570614377.
- May, Chris (2010). "Part 8 – Knitting Factory rolls out Fela Kuti reissue program (continued)". All About Jazz. Archived from the original on 23 October 2012.
- Matos, Michaelangelo (2010). "Fela Kuti: Knitting Factory Reissues". Paste (16 February). Decatur. Archived from the original on 20 October 2012.
- Moon, Tom (2008). 1,000 Recordings to Hear Before You Die. Workman Publishing. ISBN 978-0761153856.
- Olaniyan, Tejumola (2004). Arrest the Music!: Fela and His Rebel Art and Politics. Indiana University Press. ISBN 0253110343.
- Samuelson, Sam (n.d.). "Confusion – Fela Kuti : Songs, Reviews, Credits, Awards". Allmusic. Rovi Corporation. Archived from the original on 1 October 2012.
- Shapiro, Peter (2009). "Fela Kuti". In Young, Rob (ed.). The Wire Primers: A Guide to Modern Music. Verso Books. ISBN 978-1844674275.
- Smith, Derrick A. (2000). "Tony Allen: Black Voices". All About Jazz. Archived from the original on 4 November 2012.
- Veal, Michael E. (2000). Fela:The Life & Times of an African Musical Icon. Temple University Press. ISBN 1566397650.
