= Ayo (Wizkid album) =

Studio album by Wizkid
- Released: 17 September 2014
- Recorded: 2012–2014
- Length: 71:00
- Languages: English; Yoruba; Nigerian Pidgin
- Labels: Starboy; EME
- Producers: Sarz; Shizzi; Uhuru; Del B; Dokta Frabz; Maleek Berry; Legendury Beatz; Spellz

Wizkid chronology
Empire Mates State of Mind (2012)	Ayo (2014)	Sounds from the Other Side (2017)

Singles from Ayo
- 1. "Jaiye Jaiye" Released: 2 May 2013; 2. "On Top Your Matter" Released: 25 October 2013; 3. "One Question" Released: 14 February 2014; 4. "Joy" Released: 9 June 2014; 5. "Bombay" Released: 9 June 2014; 6. "Show You the Money" Released: 16 July 2014

Ayo (Yoruba: Joy) is the self-titled second studio album by Nigerian singer Wizkid. It was released on 17 September 2014, by Starboy Entertainment and Empire Mates Entertainment. Ayo was postponed twice due to difficulty in track selection. Preceding its release were the singles "Jaiye Jaiye", "On Top Your Matter", "One Question", "Joy", "Bombay" and "Show You the Money". The album also contains the song "Ojuelegba", which won Song of the Year and was nominated for Best Pop Single at The Headies 2015. Wizkid enlisted Sarz, Shizzi, Uhuru, Del B, Dokta Frabz, Maleek Berry, Legendury Beatz and Spellz to produce the album.

Ayo features collaborations with Femi Kuti, Seyi Shay, Yemi Sax, Akon, Banky W., Phyno, Tyga and Wale. It received mixed reviews from music critics; some commended its production, song arrangement and sound quality, while others panned its lyrics. Ayo won Best R&B/Pop Album and was nominated for Album of the Year at The Headies 2015. It was also nominated for Album of the Year at both the 2015 Nigeria Entertainment Awards and 2015 All Africa Music Awards.

== Background and promotion ==
Wizkid started recording Ayo after the release of the compilation album Empire Mates State of Mind (2012). Ayo was initially meant to be a mixtape. In an interview with MTV's The Wrap Up, Wizkid said the mixtape would include production and guest vocals from Rodney Rhymez, Maleek Berry and Wale. Wizkid later said the mixtape would feature Tinie Tempah and would be released in April 2013. Moreover, he announced on Twitter he would release the mixtape after he released an album in June. That same month, he posted a picture on Instagram revealing most of the album's track list. The photo revealed features with Femi Kuti, Efya, Don Jazzy, Seyi Shay and Banky W.

In October 2013, Banky W. revealed to HipTV that the album would be called Chosen. In December 2013, Wizkid spoke to iCR8Media about the album and said he worked with producers such as Don Jazzy, Dokta Frabz, Legendury Beatz, Maleek Berry, Spellz and Sarz. He also said he collaborated with Olamide, Efya, Seyi Shay, Shaydee, Banky W., L.A.X and Dammy Krane. In May 2014, Wizkid said the album would be released on 12 June, a day that acknowledges the annulled 1993 Nigerian presidential election. Moreover, he said it would be self-titled Ayo, which translates to Joy in English. On 6 September 2014, Wizkid unveiled the album's official cover art and track list on Instagram. A week earlier, he informed Olisa Adibua that the album would be his final body of work under Empire Mates Entertainment.

Wizkid promoted the album by releasing several promotional singles and headlining a few concerts. "Drop", his first collaborative single with Wale, was produced by Legendury Beatz and released on 29 July 2013. On 24 October 2013, Wizkid and Wale released their second joint track, "Nobody But You", which was produced by Maleek Berry. On 17 December 2013, Wizkid premiered the Legendury Beatz-produced track "Eledumare", which was performed at the 2013 Felabration concert. On 24 March 2014, MTV Base reported that Wizkid was invited as a special guest for some shows in Tinie Tempah's tour of the UK in 2014.

== Singles and other releases ==
The Femi Kuti-assisted track "Jaiye Jaiye" was released on 2 May 2013, as the album's lead single. The song was produced by Sarz and mastered by Foster Zeeno. The music video for "Jaiye Jaiye" was filmed in Lagos by Sesan. The album's second single, "On Top Your Matter", was released on 25 October 2013, in celebration of Valentine's Day. The song's accompanying music video was recorded in Johannesburg by Sesan. The album's third single, "One Question", was released on 14 February 2014. It features a saxophone riff by Yemi Sax and was produced by Dokta Frabz. Wizkid performed the song for BBC's Destination Africa in March 2014.

On 9 June 2014, "Joy" and "Bombay" were released simultaneously as the album's fourth and fifth singles, respectively. Both songs were produced by Dokta Frabz. Wizkid performed a cover of "No Woman, No Cry" at Koga Studios for BBC's Destination Africa and merged "Joy" with the cover. On 13 June 2014, the music video for "Bombay" was uploaded to YouTube. On 16 July 2014, the Shizzi-produced track "Show You the Money" was released as the album's sixth single. Prior to its official release, an unofficial low-quality version of the song surfaced online in March 2014. The music video for "Show You the Money" was directed by Patrick Elis and features cameo appearances from Ehiz and Dokta Frabz. Lekan Oladimeji of P.M. News rated the video 6.5 out of 10, stating: "though a video that lacks a sense of direction, low creativity and could have been achieved with next to no technical know how, it remains a video you might want to see time and over again as there's always something to smile about."

The bonus track "Caro", which features vocals by L.A.X, was produced by Legendury Beatz. The music video for "Caro" was filmed in London by Moe Musa and uploaded to YouTube on 20 August 2013. "Caro" was nominated for Hottest Single of the Year at the 2014 Nigeria Entertainment Awards and for Song of the Year at the 2014 African Muzik Magazine Awards. On 22 September 2014, Wizkid released the Soto Jose-directed music video for "In My Bed". The following month, "In My Bed" charted at number five on The Tide's list of the Top 10 Songs of the Week. The Clarence Peters-directed music video for "Ojuelegba" was released on 5 January 2015.

== Critical reception ==
Professional ratings
Review scores
Source	Rating
Lobatan	A
Nigerian Entertainment Today	3.5/5 stars
TooXclusive	2/5 stars
NotJustOk	4.5/10

Ayo received generally mixed reviews from music critics. Oscar Okeke of Lobatan awarded the album an A rating, saying it "reminds us why he has earned our respect and why he continues to rule over the realm of sound, money and girls." Rolling Stone magazine included the album on its list of the 15 Great Albums You Didn't Hear in 2014, and stated that Wizkid "uses deft, nimble flows to glide over complex beats and he writes hooks that will keep you humming for weeks."

Nigerian Entertainment Today's Ayomide Tayo awarded the album 3 stars out of 5, criticizing Wizkid for not having "what it fully takes to make creative gambles for an artiste of his calibre". Tayo also said the singer is "pretty much comfortable in flogging a dead horse until it has no more skin or flesh." Also reviewing for Nigerian Entertainment Today, Dayo Showemimo granted the album 3.5 stars out of 5, noting that it lacks a wow factor and climax.

Tayo, who also reviewed the album for Pulse Nigeria, granted Ayo 3 stars out of 5. He said it "misses the mark" and is filled with "stale singles". NotJustOk's Tola Sarumi assigned a rating of 4.5 out of 10, criticizing the album for relying profoundly on the popularity of previously released content. The duo at Should You Bump This characterized Ayo as lacking direction and described it as a "sack of undiluted disappointment." Jim Donnett of TooXclusive gave the album 2 stars out of 5, calling it "weak".

=== Accolades ===
Year	Awards ceremony	Award description(s)	Results	Ref
2015	The Headies	Best R&B/Pop Album	Won	
2015	The Headies	Album of the Year	Nominated	
2015	Nigeria Entertainment Awards	Best Album of the Year	Nominated	
2015	All Africa Music Awards	Album of the Year	Nominated	

== Track listing ==
Ayo track listing
No.	Title	Writer(s)	Producer(s)	Length
1.	"Jaiye Jaiye" (featuring Femi Kuti)	Ayodeji Balogun	Sarz	4:06
2.	"Show You The Money"	Balogun	Shizzi	3:11
3.	"In My Bed"	Balogun	Uhuru	3:50
4.	"Mummy Mi"	Balogun	Spellz	3:17
5.	"Ojuelegba"	Balogun	Legendury Beatz	3:36
6.	"Kind Love"	Balogun	Del B	3:51
7.	"On Top Your Matter"	Balogun	Del B	4:44
8.	"In Love" (featuring Seyi Shay)	Balogun; Deborah Joshua	Spellz	3:21
9.	"For You" (featuring Akon)	Balogun; Aliaune Thiam	Uhuru	3:57
10.	"Dutty Whine" (featuring Banky W.)	Balogun; Banky Wellington	Legendury Beatz	4:13
11.	"Kilofe"	Balogun	Sarz	2:29
12.	"Omalicha"	Balogun	Legendury Beatz	3:22
13.	"Bombay" (featuring Phyno)	Balogun; Azubuike Nelson	Dokta Frabz	3:20
14.	"One Question" (featuring Yemi Sax)	Balogun	Dokta Frabz	4:55
15.	"Celebrate"	Balogun	Shizzi	3:34
16.	"Show You The Money" (remix; featuring Tyga)	Balogun; Michael Nguyen-Stevenson	Shizzi	4:13
17.	"Murder" (featuring Wale)	Balogun; Olubowale Akintimehin	Maleek Berry	4:02
18.	"Joy"	Balogun	Dokta Frabz	3:15

Bonus track
No.	Title	Writer(s)	Producer(s)	Length
19.	"Caro" (Starboy featuring Wizkid and L.A.X)	Balogun; Damilola Afolabi	Legendury Beatz	4:06

== Personnel ==
Credits adapted from the back cover of Ayo

- Ayodeji Balogun – main artist, executive producer, writer, performer
- Segun Demuren – executive producer
- Banky Wellington – executive producer, featured artist, writer
- Osaretin "Sarz" Osabuohien – producer
- Sheyi "Shizzi" Akerele – producer
- Uhuru – producer
- Del B – producer
- Dokta Frabz – producer
- Maleek Berry – producer
- Legendury Beatz – producer
- Ben'Jamin "Spellz" Obadje – producer
- Femi Kuti – featured artist
- Yemi Sax – featured artist
- Deborah Joshua – featured artist, writer
- Aliaune Thiam – featured artist, writer
- Azubuike Nelson – featured artist, writer
- Michael Nguyen-Stevenson – featured artist, writer
- Olubowale Akintimehin – featured artist, writer

== Release history ==
Region	Date	Version	Format	Label
Various	September 17, 2014	Standard	CD; digital download	Starboy; E.M.E
