= Ojuelegba =

- Suburb
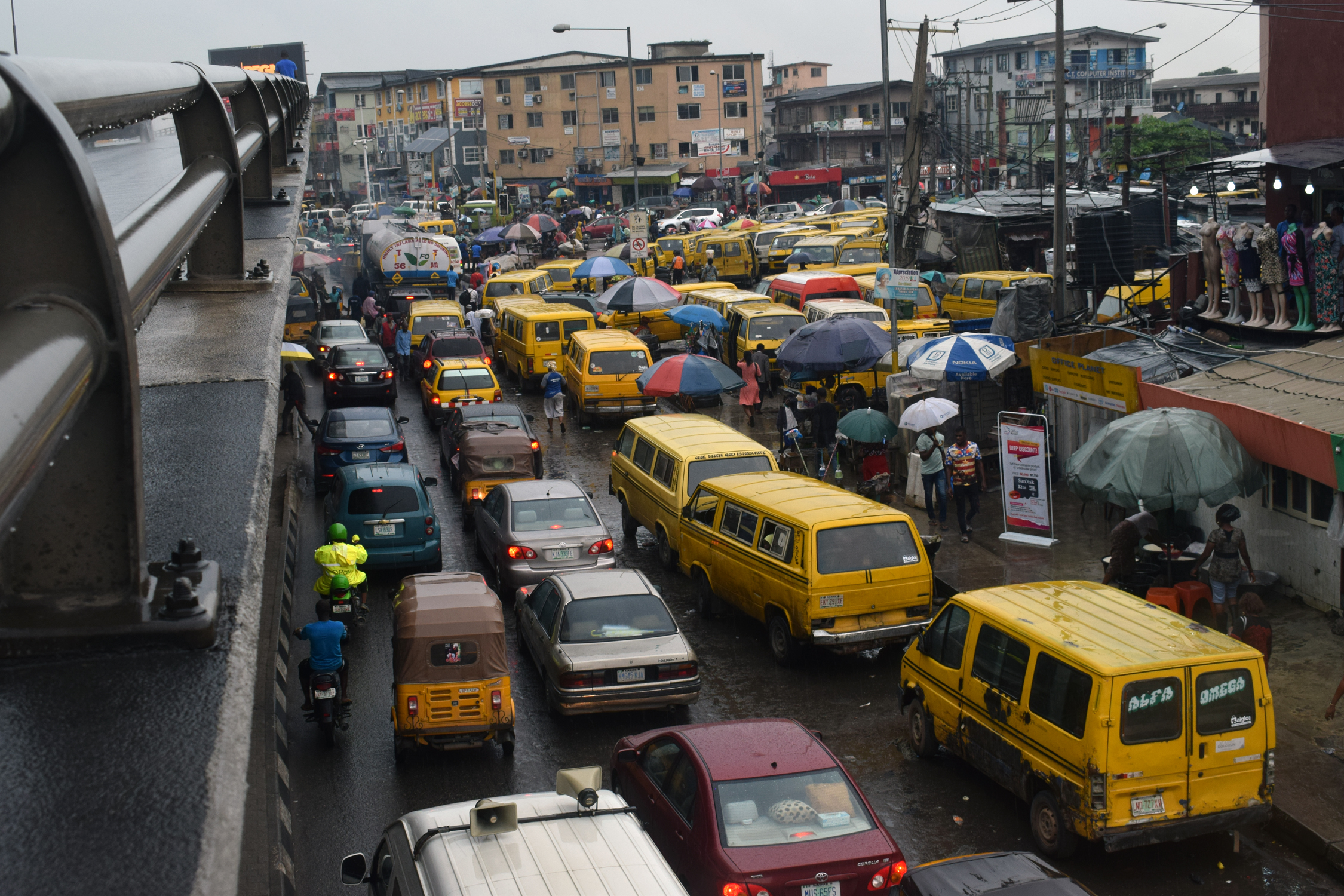

- Location of Ojuelegba in Nigeria
- Coordinates: 6°30′33.372″N 3°22′0.66″E
- Country: Nigeria
- State: Lagos State
- LGA(s): Surulere
- Time zone: UTC+1 (WAT)
- Area code: 101283

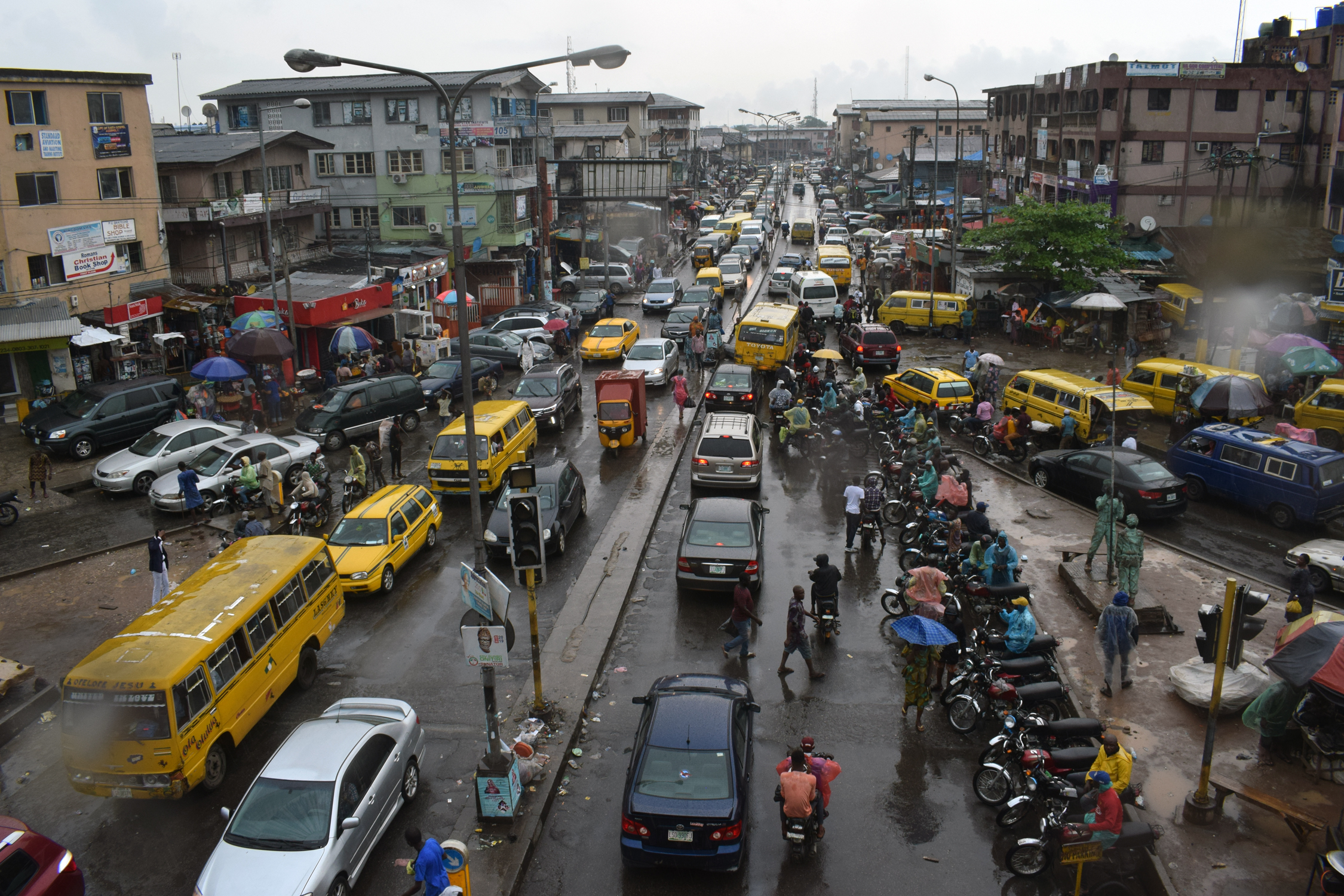
Ojuelegba bridge, Lagos

Ojuelegba is a suburb in Surulere local government area of Lagos State. It is known for its traffic congestion and nightlife.

== Structural composition ==
Ojuelegba is one of the key transport modes of Lagos, connecting the city's Mainland with the Island. It also serves as a connecting point for people who commute the three surrounding districts of Yaba, Mushin and Surulere.

Life in Ojuelegba has been depicted in several musical works, including Fela's 1975 Confusion album, Wizkid's "Ojuelegba" single, and Oritse Femi's "Double Wahala" single.

== Nightlife ==
From the 1970s through the early 1990s, Ojuelebga was known for its high crime rates and its boisterous night life, connecting revelers to Fela Kuti's Moshalashi Shrine on Agege Motor Road and to the red light district starting in Ayilara street through to parts of Clegg Street. Efforts were made in the 1990s to curb crime and prostitution, converting brothels and nightclubs to residential buildings, mosques, and churches. While armed robberies have remained rare, the area has returned to being a hotspot for prostitution.

== Mini Gallery ==
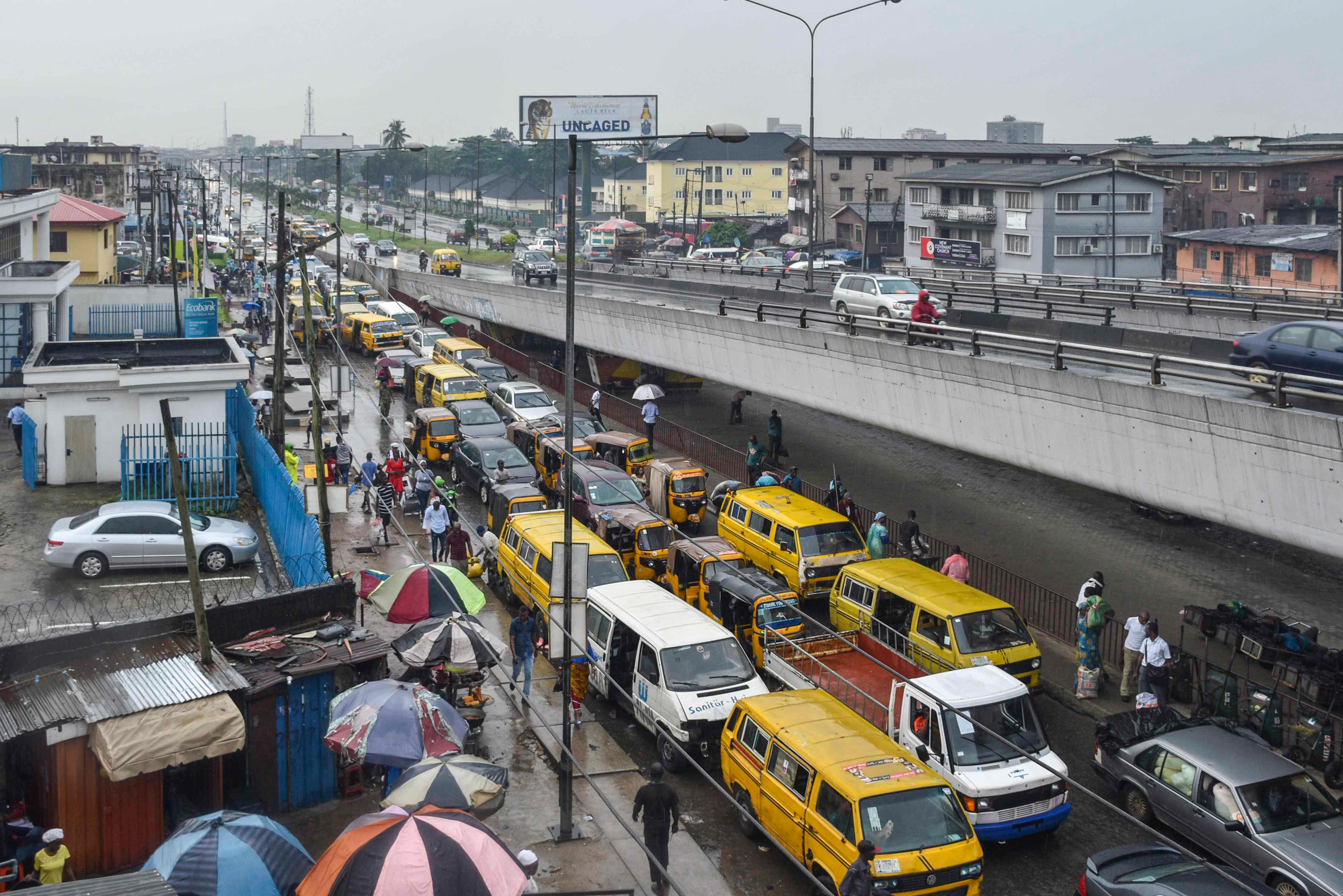

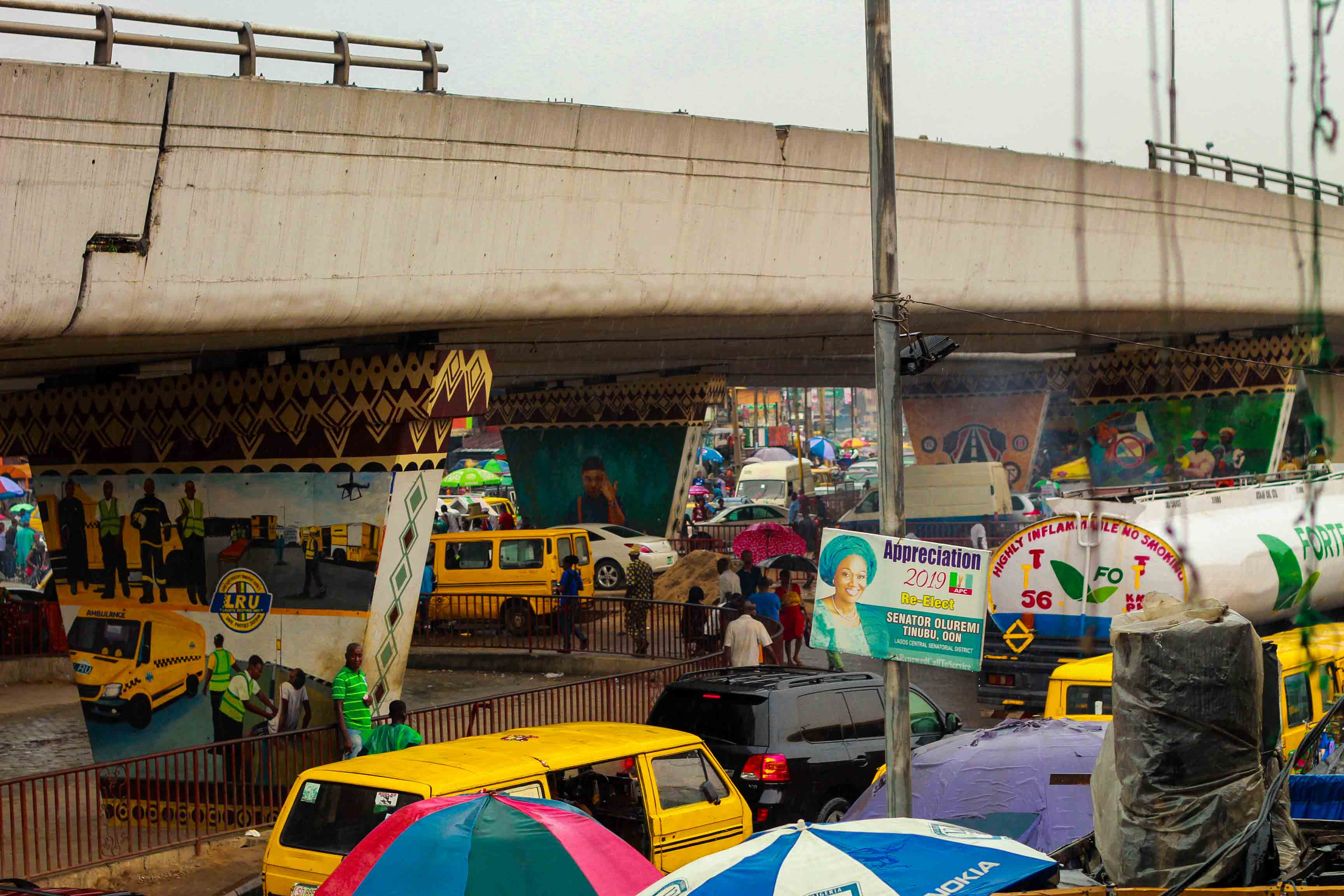

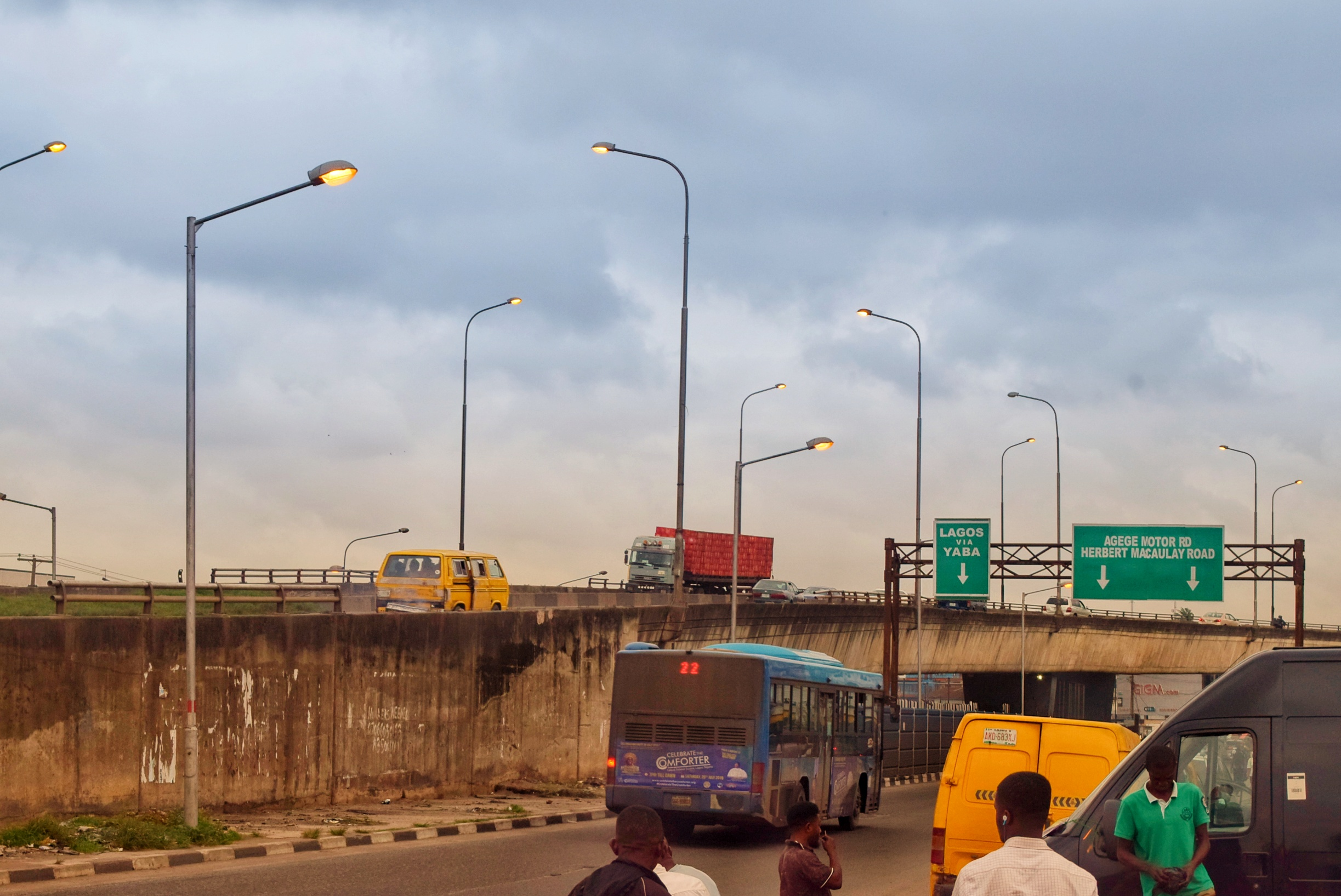

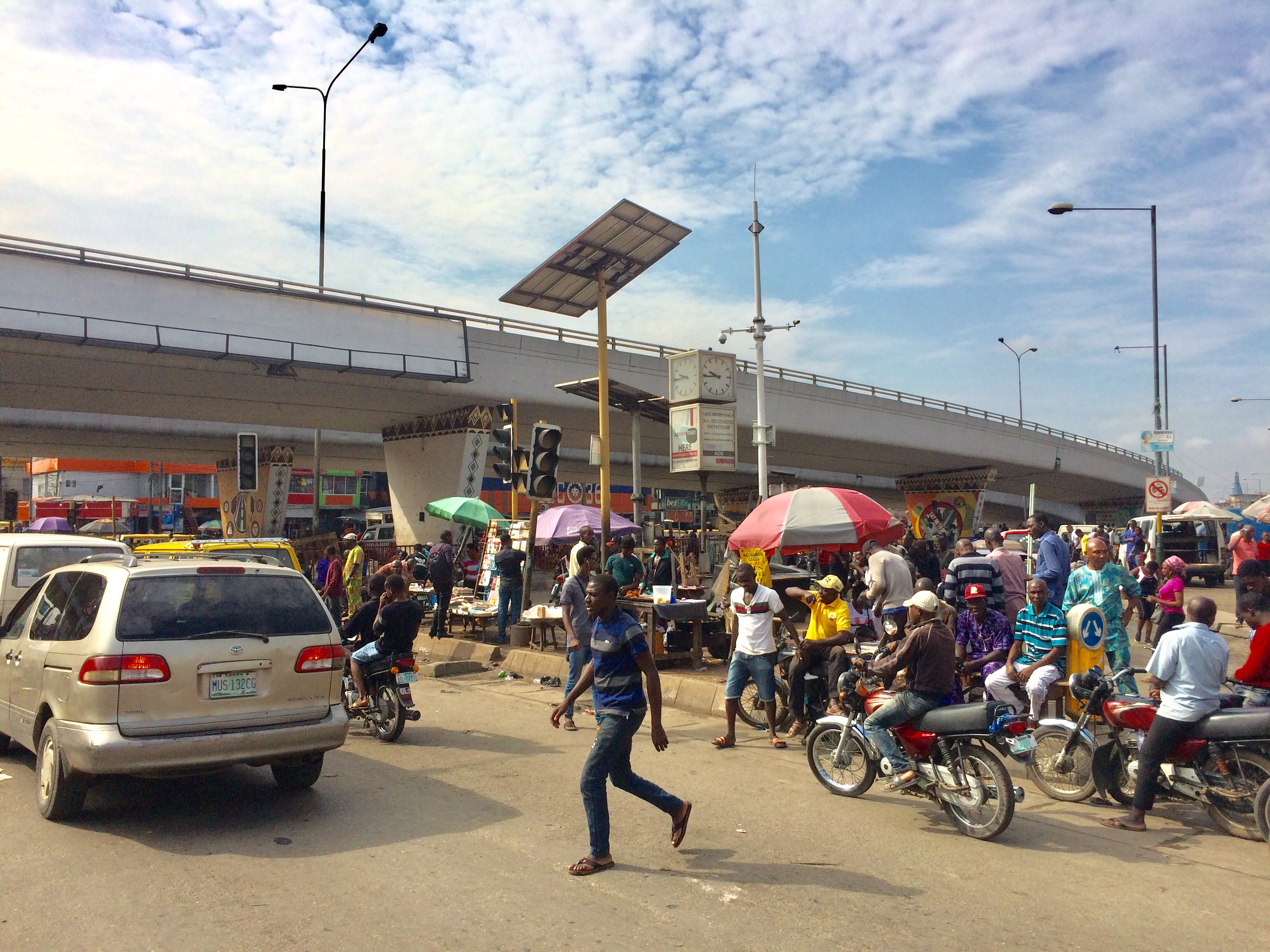

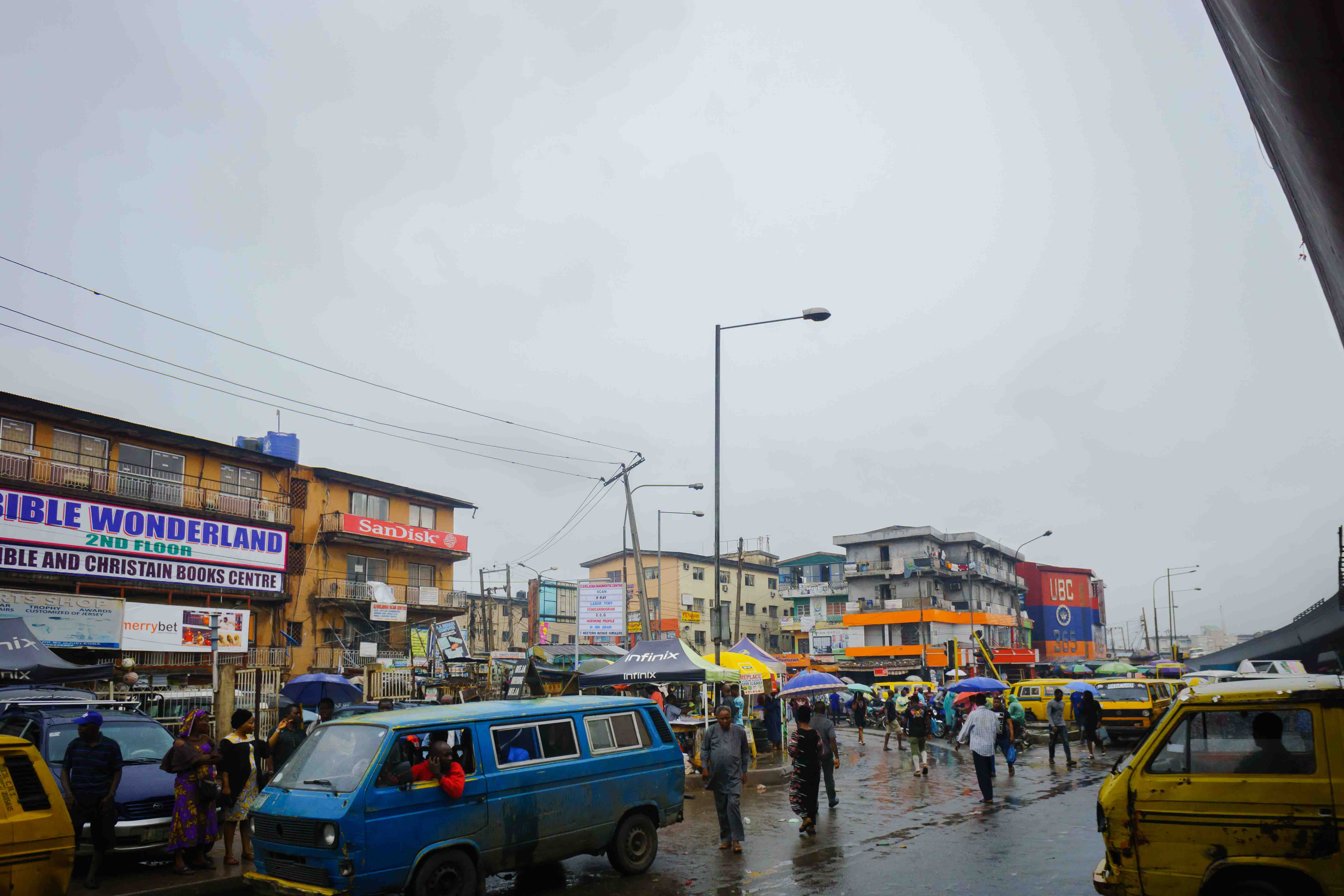

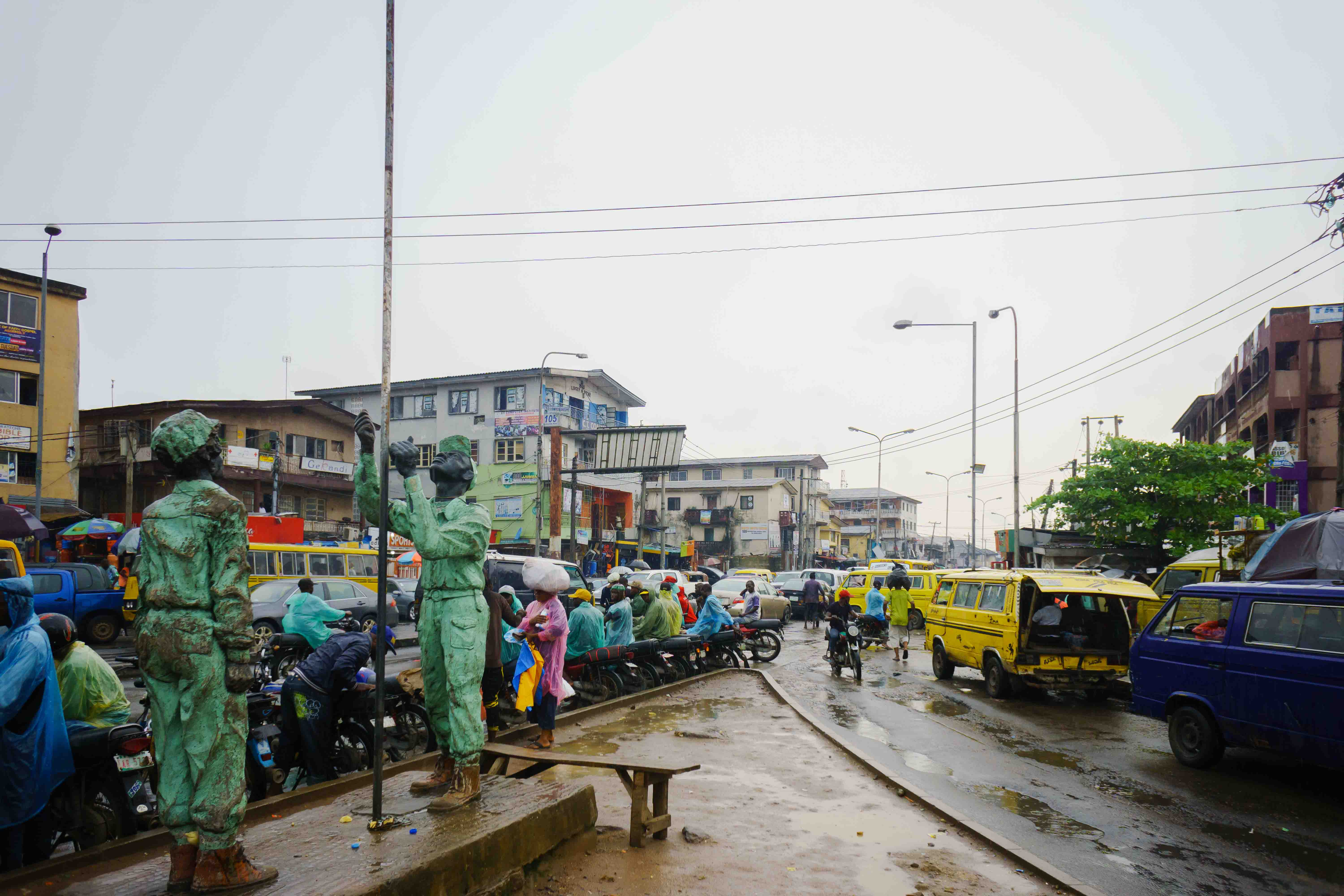

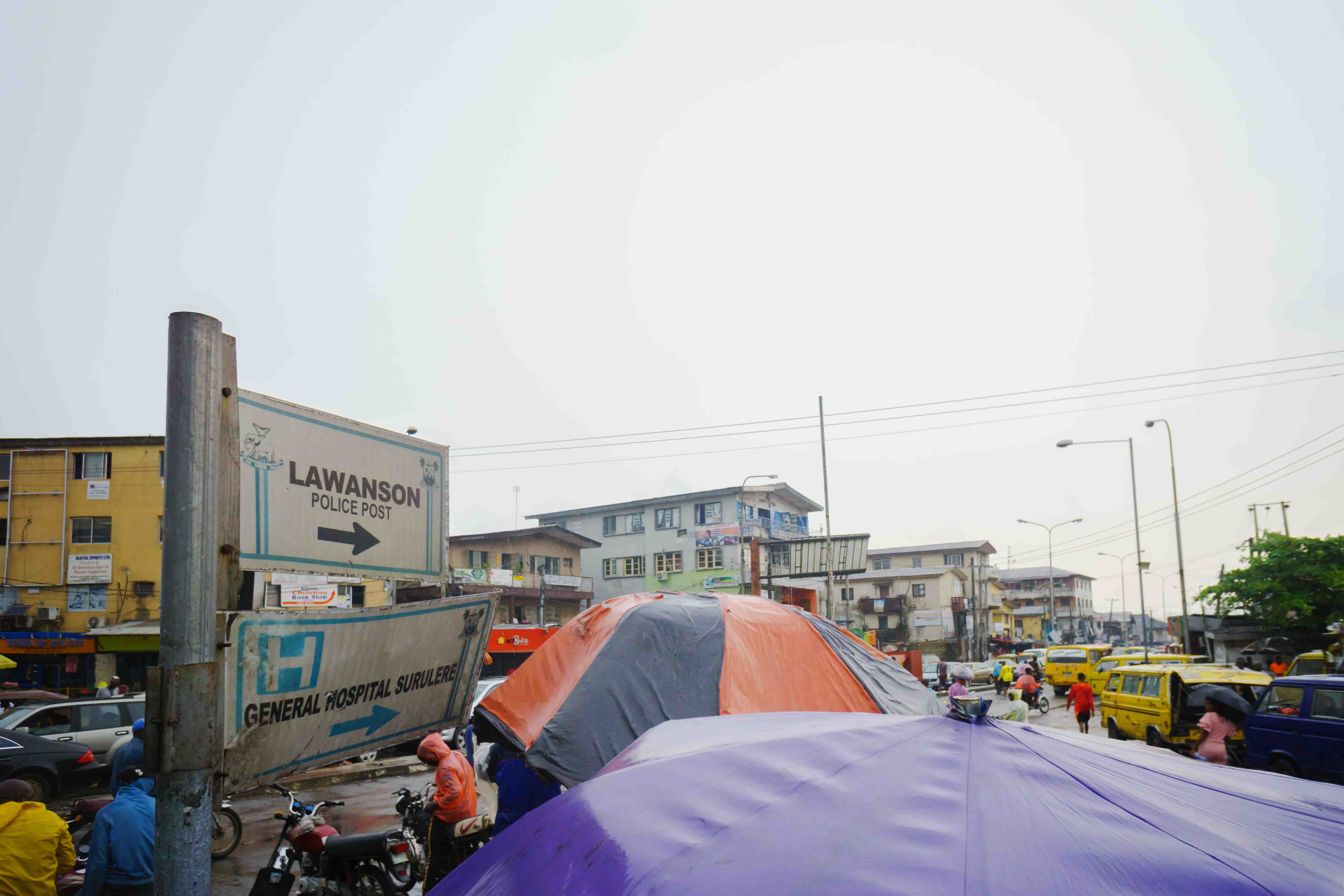

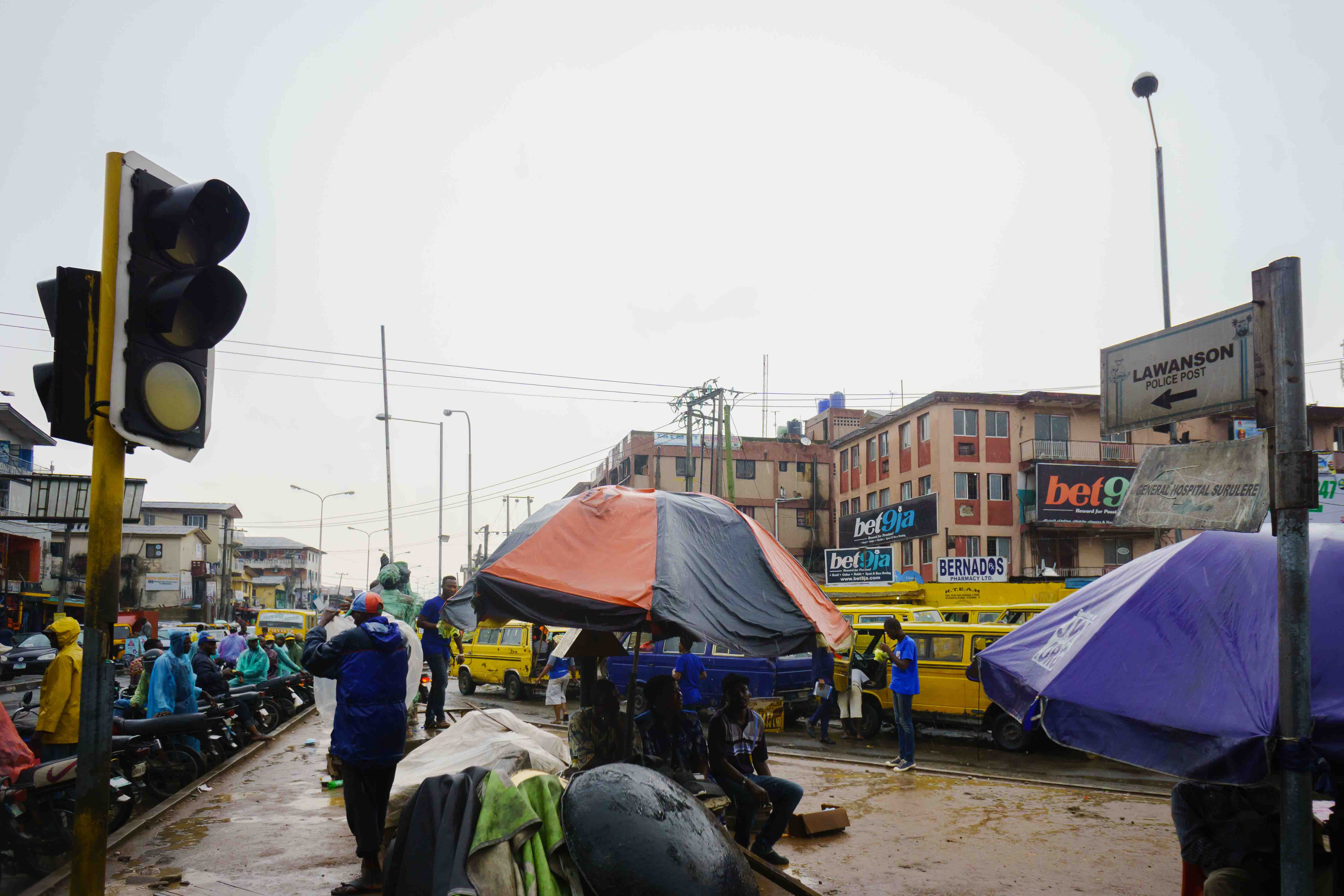

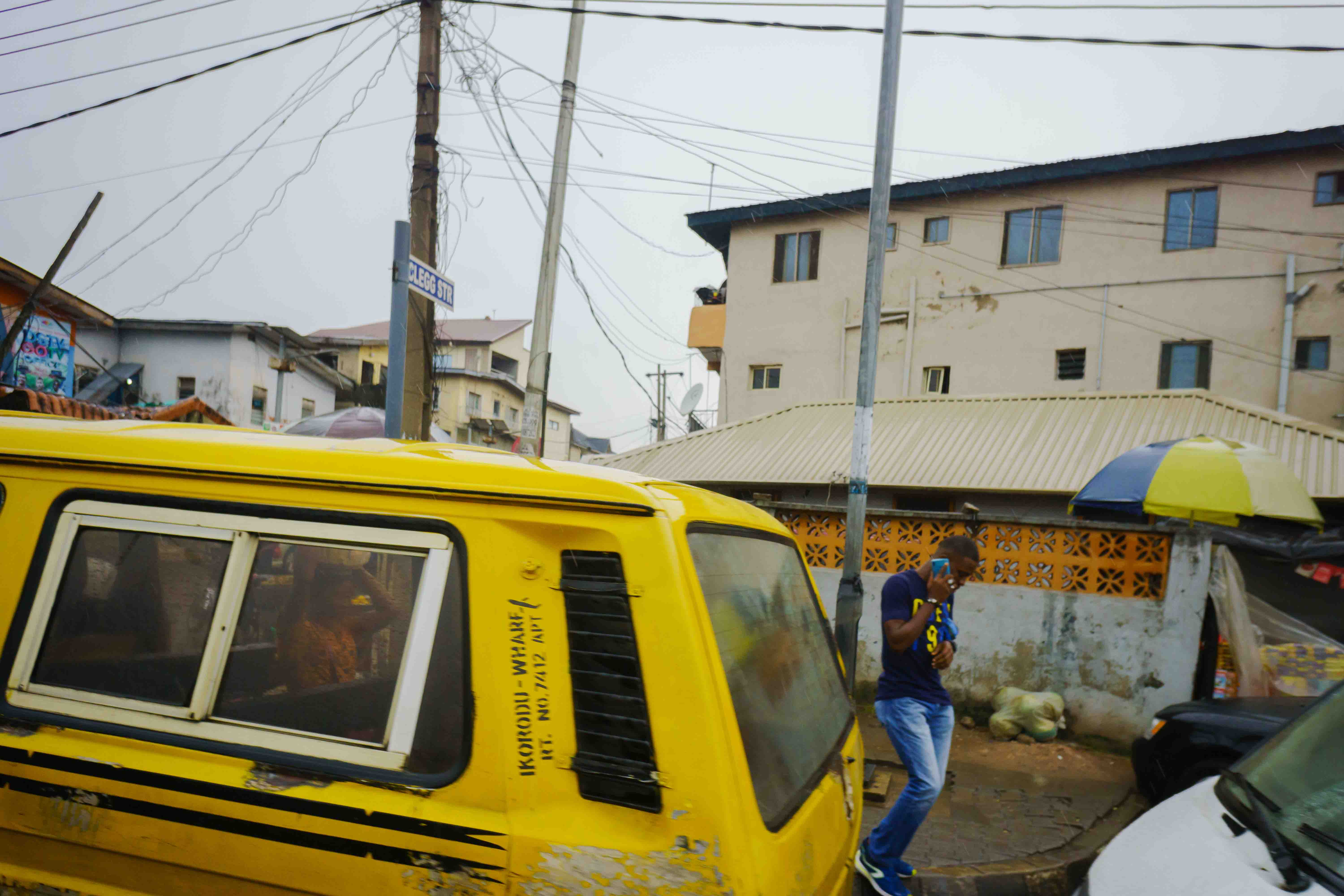

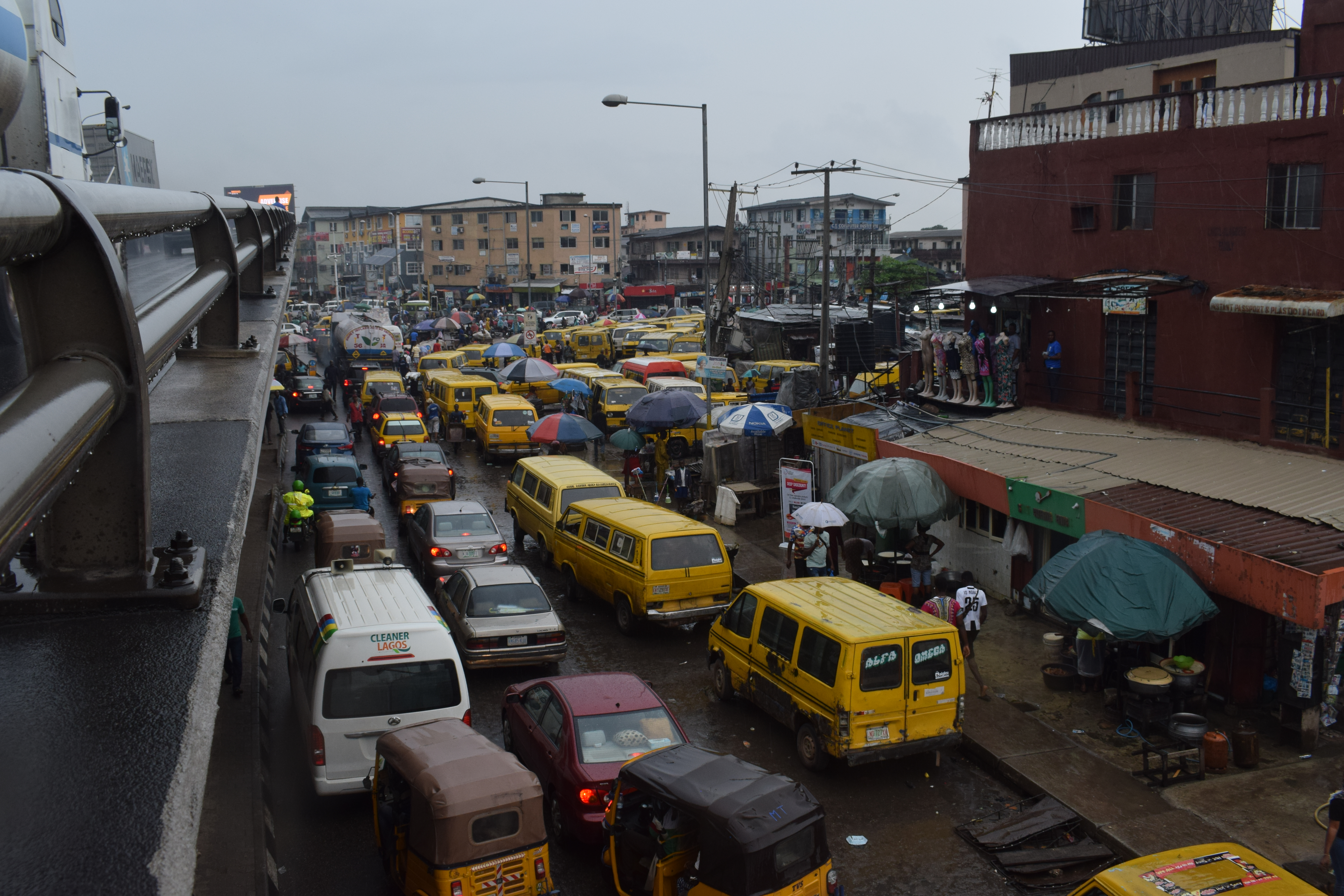

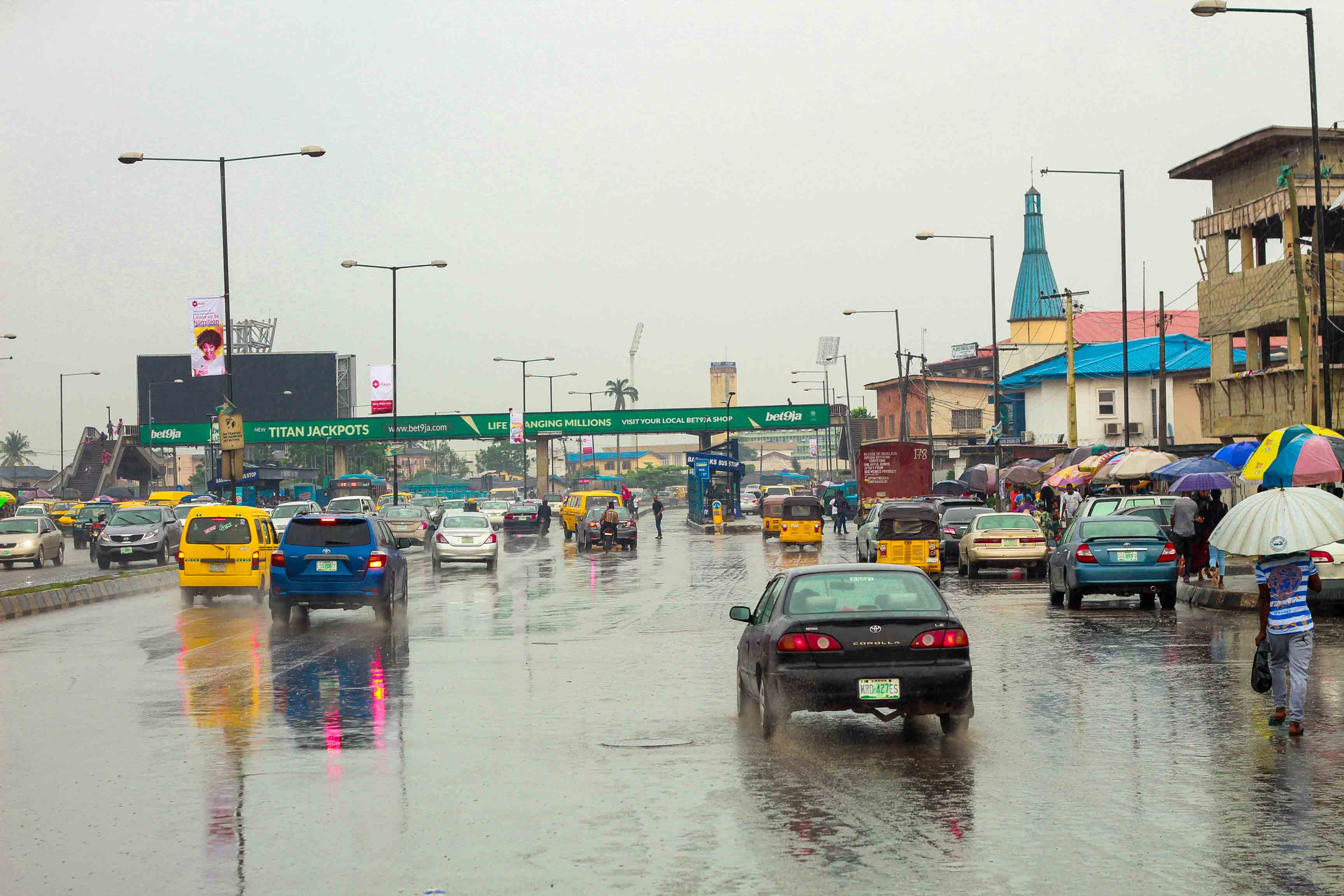

== See also ==
- Confusion (album), an album with lyrics that discuss the neighborhood
- "Ojuelegba", a song named after the neighborhood
