= Azonto (Wizkid song) =

Single by Wizkid
- Released: 28 January 2012
- Recorded: 2012
- Genre: Afrobeats
- Length: 2:38
- Label: E.M.E; Starboy
- Songwriter: Ayodeji Balogun
- Producer: Legendury Beatz

Wizkid singles chronology
"Where You Dey" (2012)	"Azonto" (2012)	"No Fronting" (2012)

Music video
- "Azonto" on YouTube

"Azonto" is a song by Nigerian singer Wizkid. It was produced by the record producing and songwriting duo Legendury Beatz, and was officially released on 28 January 2012. The song helped popularize Azonto, a Ghanaian music genre and dance, and peaked at number nineteen on the Afribiz Top 100 chart. Wizkid performed "Azonto" at Chris Brown's Lagos concert, which occurred at the Eko Hotel and Suites. Chris Brown talked about the dance on 106 & Park and thanked Wizkid for teaching him.

== Music video ==
The music video for "Azonto" was directed by Moe Musa and showcases the Azonto dance's choreography.

== Accolades ==
Director Moe Musa was nominated for Best Music Video Director at the 2013 The Headies for his work on the video. The music video for "Azonto" won Most Gifted Video of the Year and was nominated for Most Gifted Male Video at the 2013 Channel O Music Video Awards. Moreover, it was nominated for Best African Act Video at the 5th edition of the 4Syte TV Music Video Awards.

== Track listing ==
Digital single

No.	Title	Writer(s)	Producer(s)	Length
1.	"Azonto"	Wizkid	Legendury Beatz	2:38
