= Legendury Beatz =

Nigerian record production duo

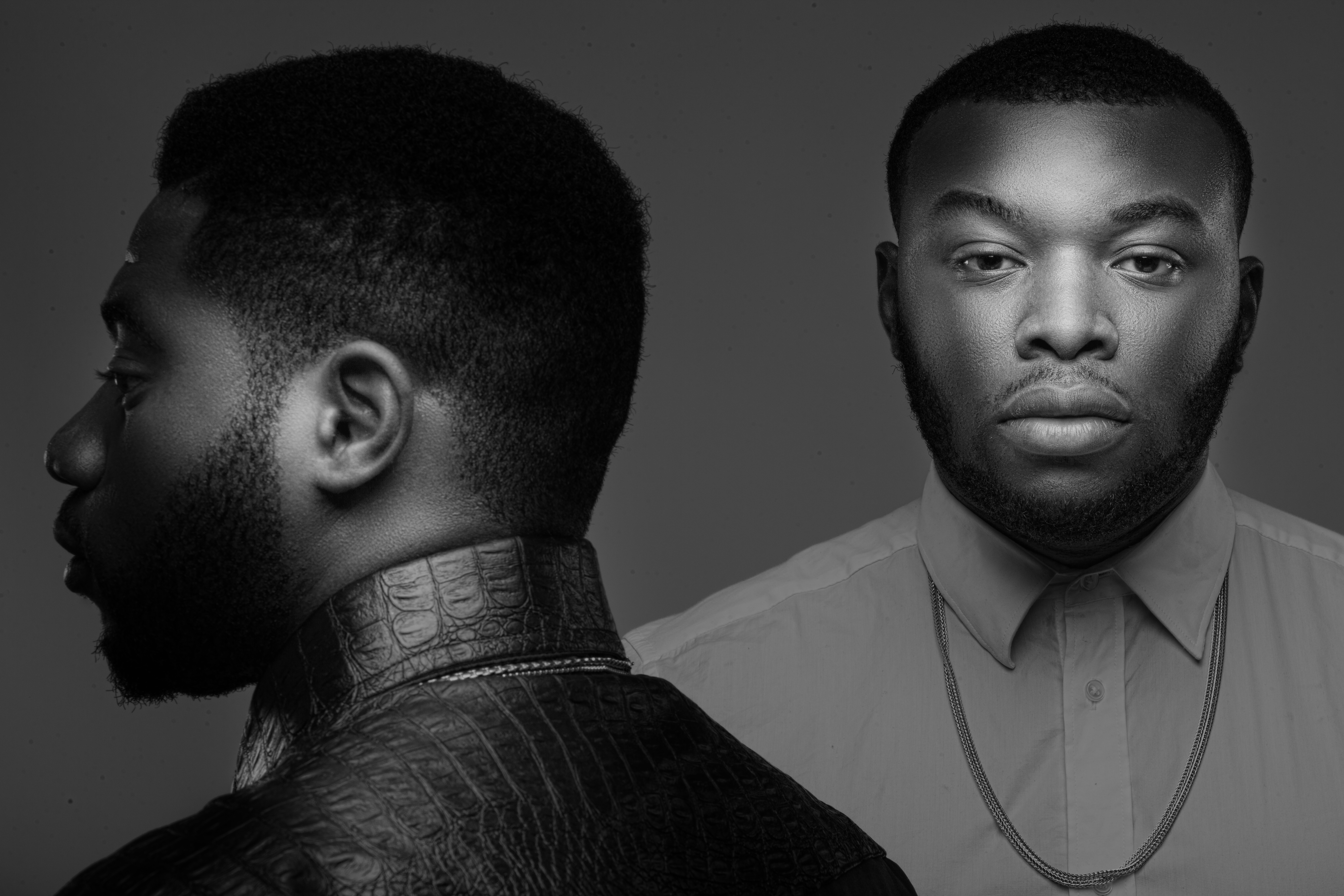
- Okiemute (left) and Uzezi (right)

Background information
- Origin: Lagos, Nigeria
- Genres: R&B; afropop; hip hop; reggae fusion; afrobeats
- Occupations: Record producers, songwriters
- Instruments: sampler, drums, synthesizer
- Years active: 2009–present
- Labels: Starboy Entertainment; House of Legendury
- Members: Mut4Y; Zei
- Website: houseoflegendury.com

Legendury Beatz (pronounced Legen-dury Beat-z) are a Nigerian record producing and songwriting duo composed of siblings Uzezi Oniko (born 17 February 1986) and Okiemute Oniko (born 27 May 1989). Their production style is deeply rooted in afrobeats as well as in several other genres, including hip hop, reggae fusion, moombahton and electro house.

With less than a year as a music production duo, Legendury Beatz made international headlines in the Nigerian recording industry by producing the critically acclaimed single "Azonto", which was performed by afrobeats recording artist and MOBO Award winner Wizkid.

Throughout their career, they have been noted for their extensive work with Wizkid. They have also been noted for writing and producing consecutive string of hits. The duo have produced many songs with vocal contribution from artistes such as American rapper Wale, British rappers Tinie Tempah and Yxng Bane, Urbano Latino artists Bad Bunny and J Balvin, 2face, Ice Prince, Efya, Banky W, Seyi Shay and Chidinma, amongst others.

== Early life and career ==
=== Formation and early works ===
With no initial music industry contacts, connections or recording studio, the duo's production followed a simple system in which they created beats channeled to a certain artist for whom they scouted for in clubs, award shows etc. The system yielded little success until they met Weird MC, a female rapper, songwriter and producer who heard their content in 2009. They created the singles "Happy Day" and "Moving Up" for her, and also created an album with her that is yet to be released.

In 2011, the duo produced "Ara", the lead single from Brymo's second studio album The Son of a Kapenta (2012). The song won Best Recording of the Year at The Headies 2012. Furthermore, the music video for the song won Best African Pop at the 2012 Channel O Music Video Awards. The duo produced the song "Ko Ma Roll" for MTV Africa Music Awards winner Mo'Cheddah.

In 2012, the duo produced "Baddest Boy", the lead single from Empire Mates Entertainment's compilation album Empire Mates State of Mind (2012). Legendury Beatz also produced the song "Emi Ni Baller" for Kora Awards winner Chidinma. The song broke a record for Chidinma, as she became the first female musician to peak at number 1 on the MTV Base Official Naija Top 10 chart. Legendury Beatz produced the song “Drop” with vocal contributions from American rapper Wale and Wizkid.

In 2013, the duo produced the song "Caro", which was included as a bonus on Wizkid's second studio album Ayo (2014). In 2014, the duo produced "That Could Be Us" for Nigerian rapper Ice Prince. They also worked with other notable African artists, including Banky W, Seyi Shay and Efya.

=== Production work and record deal ===
Legendury Beatz and Wizkid's production catalog include songs like "Ginger", "Caro", "Talk", "Eledumare", "Number One Lover", Won Gbo Mi", "Juru" and "Emi Ni Baller" (Remix). On 29 April 2013, Legendury Beatz were signed to Wizkid's Starboy Entertainment. The duo produced four songs on his second studio album Ayo. The song "Ojuelegba" was well-received across different social media platforms. It contributed to the overall success of the album, which received a positive review from Rolling Stone magazine. Wizkid added contributing vocals to the duo's first single "Oje". Legendury Beatz and Simi collaborated on "Ayo", the third single from her third studio album Omo Charlie Champagne, Vol. 1 (2019).

== Influences and style ==
Okiemute and Uzezi's production style is highly influenced by afrobeats, fuji, and all variations of Congolese music from African icons such as Fela Kuti, Lagbaja, Awilo Longomba and Angélique Kidjo. The duo also had an ear for hip hop, pop and contemporary R&B genres.

== Discography ==
Mixtapes

- DJ Spinall Presents: Legendury Beatz Greatest Hits (2014)

Singles produced

Title	Year	Album
"Azonto" by Wizkid	2012	—N/a
"2Musshh" by Reminisce	2012	Book of Rap Stories
"Baddest Boy" by E.M.E (featuring Wizkid, Skales and Banky W.)	2012	Empire Mates State of Mind
"I Love You (Afurum Gi N’ anya)" by Shiikane	2012	—N/a
"Emi Ni Baller" by Chidinma (featuring Tha Suspect and Illbliss)	2012	Oga Boss
"Koma Roll" (Remix) by Tillaman (featuring Iyanya, Burna Boy, Ice Prince, Phyno and Trigga Madtonic)	2013	—N/a
"Denge Pose" by Skales	2013	—N/a
"Take Care of Me" by Skales	2013	—N/a
"Juru" by Wizkid	2013	DJ Xclusive Presents: The Xclusive Wizkid Mixtape
"Packaging" by Tillaman	2013	—N/a
"Talk" by Wizkid	2013	—N/a
"M.I.A (Money In Abundance)" by Tesh Carter (featuring That Suspect)	2013	—N/a
"Murda Dem" (Remix) by Phenom (featuring Wizkid)	2013	—N/a
"Sewere" by Weird MC (featuring Sasha P, Mo'Cheddah and DrPat)	2013	—N/a
"Drop" by Wizkid (featuring Wale)	2013	—N/a
"Kokose" by Sound Sultan (featuring Wizkid)	2013	Me, My Mouth & Eye
"Caro" by Starboy (featuring Wizkid and L.A.X)	2013	Ayo
"Ur Level" by Big Mo	2013	—N/a
"Won Gbo Mi" by Shaydee (featuring Wizkid)	2013	—N/a
"Eledumare" by Wizkid	2013	—N/a
"Number One Lover" by Starboy (featuring Wizkid and Shaydee)	2014	—N/a
"Ginger" by L.A.X (featuring Wizkid)	2014	—N/a
"Ibadi" by May D	2014	—N/a
"Oje" by Legendury Beatz (featuring Wizkid)	2014	—N/a
"Oh! Baby" by Legendury Beatz (featuring Wizkid and Efya)	2014	—N/a
"Crazy" by Seyi Shay (featuring Wizkid)	2014	Seyi or Shay
"That Could Be Us" by Ice Prince	2014	—N/a
"Potential" (Freestyle) by Shaydee	2014	—N/a

Other production

Artist(s)	Year	Album	Songs
Skales & Niyola	2012	Empire Mates State of Mind	18. "Wetin' I Want"
Phenom	2014	The B.R.A EP	9. "Foje Le" (featuring Phyno)
Wizkid	2014	Ayo	5. "Ojuelegba"
Wizkid	2014	Ayo	10. "Dutty Whine" (featuring Banky W.)
Wizkid	2014	Ayo	12. "Omalicha"

== Awards and nominations ==
Year	Event	Prize	Recipient	Result
2013	The Headies 2013	Producer of the Year	Legendury Beatz for "Emi Ni Baller"	Nominated
2014	The Headies 2014	Producer of the Year	Legendury Beatz for "Caro"	Nominated
2015	The Headies 2015	Producer of the Year	Legendury Beatz for "Ojuelegba"	Won
