= Ojuelegba (song) =

Song by Wizkid

from the album Ayo
- Language: Yoruba, English
- Released: 17 September 2014
- Recorded: 2013–2014
- Genre: Afrobeats
- Length: 3:36
- Label: Starboy Entertainment
- Songwriter: Ayodeji Balogun
- Producer: Legendury Beatz

"Ojuelegba" is a song by Nigerian singer Wizkid from his self-titled second studio album, Ayo (2014). The official remix features rap verses by Canadian rapper Drake and English grime artist Skepta. "Ojuelegba" won Song of the Year at The Headies 2015 and Hottest Single of the Year at the 2015 Nigeria Entertainment Awards.

== Background ==
"Ojuelegba" was written by Wizkid and produced by the record producing duo Legendury Beatz. It emphasizes the singer's hardships as an underground artist who wandered the streets of Ojuelegba to support his recording ambition. The song's title is derived from the metropolitan area of Lagos Mainland. "Ojuelegba" received numerous airplay on all major radio stations in Nigeria, and peaked at number one on Capital Xtra's Afrobeats Chart for February 2015. A video posted to Instagram in November 2013 shows Wizkid recording the song in a studio. The singer intended to feature 2Baba on the track.

== "Ojuelegba" (Remix) ==
The remix of "Ojuelegba" features rap verses by Canadian rapper Drake and English grime artist Skepta. It made its premiere on OVO Sound Radio in July 2015, and was ranked 12th on The Fader's list of the 107 Best Songs of 2015. Ghanaian rapper Sarkodie released a cover version of the original track in March 2015. The remix of "Ojuelegba" originated through external interests rather than a planned follow-up by Wizkid. Skepta introduced the song to Drake after meeting him at the Wireless Festival in early July 2015. Wizkid later revealed that Drake proposed recording the track. According to the singer, the two connected on Instagram and agreed to meet in London. Wizkid said Drake recorded his verse prior to them meeting and disclosed that the entire track was completed during a studio session. Anupa Mistry of Pitchfork characterized the song as "a rose-tinted Afropop gospel, sung in both English and Yoruba, about life in a hard-working Lagos neighborhood with a joyous hook fit for two-stepping in the club."

== Music video ==
The accompanying music video for "Ojuelegba" was directed by Clarence Peters and uploaded to YouTube on 5 January 2015. The video features a scene of a bus conductor calling out to passengers to board his vehicle to Ojuelegba; Wizkid is seen boarding the bus. B-roll scenes of Ayilara and Itire roads were also included in the cut. The video depicts community life in Ojuelegba, story-lines Wizkid's upbringing, and highlights the singer's journey from grass to grace. Additionally, it portrays the message of goodwill and family support needed to ascend during times of hardship.

Critical reception to the music video was mixed. Pulse Nigeria's Joey Akan said the video is not a true representation of the song because it lacks inspiration. On the contrary, Joda Afolabi of Nigerian Entertainment Today commended Clarence Peters for shooting the video and said it "depicts a thorough and true reflection of what the song preaches." Writing for the Royal Times, Bukola Adegunle awarded the video 3 stars out of 5, extensively stating: "creativity was displayed, which gave meaning to the video. The scenes were well arranged and there was a great link in all the scenes." Jim Donnett and Jimmy King rated the video 3.8, commending its simplistic factor.

== Live performances ==
Wizkid performed the song along with "Jaiye Jaiye" at the Indigo O2 Arena in London on 26 September 2014.

== Accolades ==
Year	Award ceremony	Prize	Result	Ref
2015	Nigeria Entertainment Awards	Hottest Single of the Year	Won	
2015	African Muzik Magazine Awards	Song of the Year	Won	
2015	African Muzik Magazine Awards	Video of the Year	Nominated	
2015	All Africa Music Awards	Song of the Year	Nominated	
2015	All Africa Music Awards	Artist of the Year (Wizkid for "Ojuelegba")	Nominated	
2015	All Africa Music Awards	Songwriter of the Year (Wizkid for "Ojuelegba")	Nominated	
2015	All Africa Music Awards	Best Male Artist in West Africa (Wizkid for "Ojuelegba")	Nominated	
2015	All Africa Music Awards	Producer of the Year (Legendury Beatz for "Ojuelegba")	Nominated	
2015	4Syte TV Music Video Awards	Best African Act Video	Nominated	
2015	COSON Song Awards	The Song of Songs	Nominated	
2015	COSON Song Awards	Hottest Song on the Street	Nominated	
2015	The Beatz Awards	Best Afro Beat Producer (Legendury Beatz for "Ojuelegba")	Won	
2015	The Beatz Awards	Best Mixing & Mastering Engineer (Suka Sounds for "Ojuelegba")	Nominated	
2015	The Headies	Best Pop Single	Nominated	
2015	The Headies	Song of the Year	Won	
2015	The Headies	Best Recording of the Year	Nominated	
2015	The Headies	Producer of the Year (Legendury Beatz for "Ojuelegba")	Won	
2015	tooXclusive Awards	Certified Banger of the Year	Nominated	
2015	Nigerian Music Video Awards	Best Afrobeat Video	Won	

== Personnel ==
Song credits

- Writing – Ayodeji Balogun
- Production – Legendury Beatz
- Mixing, mastering – Suka Sounds

Video credits

- Director – Clarence Peters

== Certifications ==
Certifications for "Ojuelegba"
Region	Certification	Certified units/sales
United Kingdom (BPI)	Silver	200,000^{‡}
^{‡} Sales+streaming figures based on certification alone.
