= Jaiye Jaiye =

Single by Wizkid featuring Femi Kuti

from the album Ayo
- Released: 2 May 2013
- Recorded: 2013
- Genre: Afrobeat; afrobeats
- Length: 3:47
- Label: Starboy; E.M.E
- Songwriter: Ayodeji Balogun
- Producer: Sarz

Wizkid singles chronology
"Slow Down" (2013)	"Jaiye Jaiye" (2013)	"Only Man She Want (Remix)" (2013)

Music video
- "Jaiye Jaiye" on YouTube

"Jaiye Jaiye" is a song by Nigerian singer Wizkid. It was released as the lead single from his second studio album, Ayo (2014), and features a saxophone riff by Femi Kuti. The song was produced by Sarz and mastered by Foster Zeeno.

== Background and recording ==
According to a behind-the-scene video uploaded to YouTube on 13 May 2013, the recording process started when Wizkid called Yeni Kuti and asked her if she could get her brother to collaborate with him. Kuti said she was shocked and surprised when Wizkid contacted her. When she told her brother, he agreed to work with Wizkid. Femi Kuti told Wizkid to postpone their recording session because he was busy with Nigerian Idol and other projects at the time. Wizkid and Femi Kuti ended up doing subsequent recording sessions.

== Music video ==
The accompanying music video for "Jaiye Jaiye" was released on 26 October 2013, at a total length of 4 minutes and 11 seconds. The video was filmed by Sesan at the New Afrika Shrine and features a creative cameo by Fela Anikulakpo Kuti.

On 2 October 2013, Wizkid uploaded several behind-the-scene photos of the video shoot to his Instagram account.

== Critical reception ==
Upon its release, "Jaiye Jaiye" received positive reviews from music critics. Ovie O of NotJustOk praised the track's beat progression, Femi's saxophone riff, and Wizkid's delivery. OkayAfrica commended the singer for "riding out the brass melody and Sarz beat with his signature high-pitched croons."

=== Accolades ===
The music video for "Jaiye Jaiye" was nominated for Best Music Video of the Year at the 2014 Nigeria Entertainment Awards.

== Track listing ==
- Digital download
1. "Jaiye Jaiye" (Wizkid featuring Femi Kuti) - 3:47
- Covers
1. "Jaiye Jaiye" (Dunnie Acoustic cover) - 3:35

== Release history ==
Country	Date	Format	Label
Nigeria	2 May 2013	Digital download	Star Boy Entertainment
