= P-Square discography =

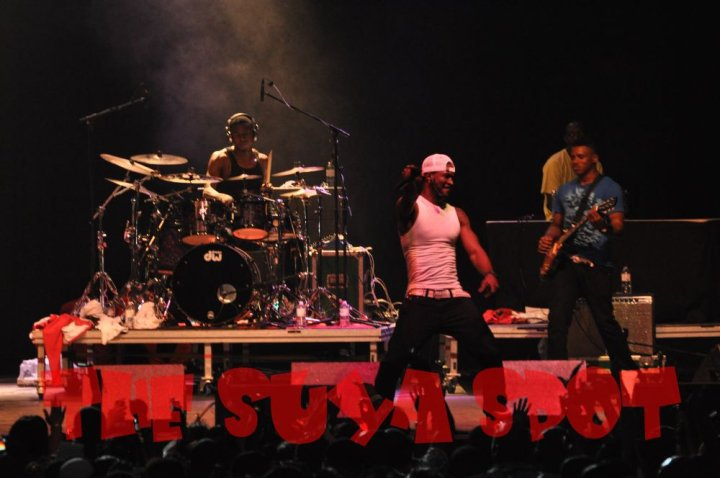
- Studio albums: 5
- Compilation albums: 2
- Singles: 29
- Music videos: 25

The discography of P-Square, a Nigerian R&B duo composed of Peter and Paul Okoye, consists of five studio albums, one compilation album, twenty nine singles (including seven as featured artists), and twenty five music videos. Peter & Paul Okoye were raised in Jos, Nigeria. They both joined their school's music and drama club where they began singing, dancing and miming songs by MC Hammer, Bobby Brown and Michael Jackson.

In 1999, Peter and Paul returned to music school to develop their skills on the keyboard, drums, bass and rhythm guitar. Their work includes the soundtracks for a number of films such as Tobi, Mama Sunday, Moment of Bitterness and Evas River.

== Albums ==
=== Studio albums ===
| Title | Album details | Peak chart positions | | | | Certifications | Sales |
| Title | Album details | UK | NGR | FR | US | Certifications | Sales |
|---|---|---|---|---|---|---|---|
| Last Nite | Released: May 2003; Label: Timbuk2 Music Label; Genre:R&B; Formats: CD, digital download | — | — | — | — | | |
| Get Squared | Released: May 2005; Label: Square Records; Genre:R&B; Length: 59:25; Formats: CD, digital download | — | — | — | — | | |
| Game Over | Released: May 2007; Label: Square Records; Genre:R&B; Formats: CD, digital download | — | — | — | — | | |
| Danger | Released: 13 September 2009; Label: Square Records; Genre:R&B; Formats: CD, digital download | — | — | — | — | Platinum | Nigeria: 9,000,000 |
| The Invasion | Released: 29 July 2011; Label: Square Records; Genre: R&B, Afropop; Formats: CD, digital download | — | — | — | — | | |

=== Compilation album ===
| Title | Album details | Peak chart positions | | | | Certifications | Sales |
| Title | Album details | UK | NGR | FR | US | Certifications | Sales |
|---|---|---|---|---|---|---|---|
| Greatest Hits | Released: 5 May 2013; Label: Square Records; Genre:R&B, Afropop; Formats: CD, digital download | — | — | — | — | | |

== Singles ==
=== As lead artists ===
List of singles, with selected chart positions
| Title | Year | Peak chart positions | | | | | Certifications | Album |
| Title | Year | UK | NGR | FR | BEL (Wa) | US | Certifications | Album |
|---|---|---|---|---|---|---|---|---|
| "Senorita" | 2003 | — | — | — | — | — | | Last Nite |
| "Igbedu" | 2003 | — | — | — | — | — | | Last Nite |
| "Bizzy Body" | 2005 | — | — | — | — | — | | Get Squared |
| "Story" | 2005 | — | — | — | — | — | | Get Squared |
| "Get Squared" | 2005 | — | — | — | — | — | | Get Squared |
| "Temptation" | 2005 | — | — | — | — | — | | Get Squared |
| "Omoge Mi" | 2005 | — | — | — | — | — | | Get Squared |
| "No One Like You" | 2007 | — | — | — | — | — | | Game Over |
| "Do Me" (featuring Waje) | 2007 | — | — | — | — | — | | Game Over |
| "More Than A Friend" | 2007 | — | — | — | — | — | | Game Over |
| "Ifunanya" | 2007 | — | — | — | — | — | | Game Over |
| "Roll It" | 2007 | — | — | — | — | — | | Game Over |
| "I Love You" | 2009 | — | — | — | — | — | | Danger |
| "E No Easy" (featuring J.Martins) | 2009 | — | — | 141 | — | — | | Danger |
| "Possibility" (featuring 2 Face Idibia) | 2009 | — | — | — | — | — | | Danger |
| "Danger" | 2009 | — | — | — | — | — | | Danger |
| "Gimme Dat" | 2009 | — | — | — | — | — | | Danger |
| "Forever" | 2011 | — | — | — | — | — | | The Invasion |
| "Beautiful Onyinye" (featuring Rick Ross) | 2011 | — | — | — | — | — | | The Invasion |
| "Chop My Money" (featuring Akon & May D) | 2011 | — | — | — | — | — | | The Invasion |
| "Alingo" | 2012 | — | — | — | — | — | | Double Trouble |
| "Personally" | 2013 | — | — | 104 | — | — | | Double Trouble |
| "Magical Healing" | 2013 | — | — | - | — | — | | |
| "OMG! (Free Me)" | 2015 | — | — | - | — | — | | |

=== As featured artists ===
| Single | Year | Peak chart positions | | | | | Certifications | Album |
| Single | Year | UK | NGR | FR | BEL (Wa) | US | Certifications | Album |
|---|---|---|---|---|---|---|---|---|
| "Freeze" (AY featuring P-Square) | 2008 | — | — | — | — | — | | TBA |
| "Good or Bad (Owey)" (J.Martins featuring Timaya and P-Square) | 2008 | — | — | — | — | — | | Get Serious |
| "No Time" (Bracket featuring P-Square) | 2009 | — | — | — | — | — | | Least Expected |
| "You and Me" (Cindy Sanyu featuring P-Square) | 2009 | — | — | — | — | — | | TBA |
| "All The Way" (9ice featuring P-Square) | 2011 | — | — | — | — | — | | Versus |
| "Follow Follow" (LKT featuring P-Square) | 2011 | — | — | — | — | — | | The Journey |
| "Positif" (Matt Houston featuring P-Square) | 2012 | — | — | 5 | 7 | — | | Racines |
| "Getting Down" (Mokobé featuring P-Square) | 2015 | — | — | 17 | 43 (Ultratip) | — | | |

== Music videos ==
=== As lead artists ===
| Year | Title | Director(s) |
|---|---|---|
| 2003 | "Senorita" | Jude Engees Okoye |
| 2003 | "Igbedu" | Jude Engees Okoye |
| 2005 | "Bizzy Body" | Jude Engees Okoye |
| 2005 | "Story" | Jude Engees Okoye |
| 2005 | "Get Squared" | Jude Engees Okoye |
| 2005 | "Temptation" | Jude Engees Okoye |
| 2005 | "Omoge Mi" | Jude Engees Okoye |
| 2007 | "No One Like You" | Jude Engees Okoye |
| 2007 | "Do Me" (featuring Waje) | Jude Engees Okoye |
| 2007 | "More Than a Friend" | Jude Engees Okoye |
| 2007 | "Ifunanya" | Jude Engees Okoye |
| 2007 | "Roll It" | Jude Engees Okoye |
| 2009 | "I Love You" | Jude Engees Okoye |
| 2009 | "E No Easy" (featuring J.Martins) | Jude Engees Okoye |
| 2009 | "Possibility" (featuring 2 Face Idibia) | Jude Engees Okoye |
| 2009 | "Danger" | Jude Engees Okoye |
| 2009 | "Gimme Dat" | Jude Engees Okoye |
| 2011 | "Beautiful Onyinye" (featuring Rick Ross) | Jude Engees Okoye |
| 2011 | "Chop My Money" (featuring Akon and May D) | Jude Engees Okoye |
| 2012 | "Alingo" | Jude Engees Okoye |
| 2013 | "Personally" | Jude Engees Okoye |
| 2014 | "Shekini" | |
| 2014 | "Collabo" (featuring Don Jazzy) | |

=== As featured artists ===
| Year | Title | Director(s) |
|---|---|---|
| 2008 | "Good or Bad (Owey)" (J.Martins featuring Timaya and P-Square) | N/A |
| 2009 | "No Time" (Bracket featuring P-Square) | Clarence Peters |
| 2011 | "Follow Follow" (LKT featuring P-Square) | Clarence Peters |
| 2012 | "Positif" (Matt Houston featuring P-Square) | O.P |
| 2015 | "Kwaroro" (J Martins featuring P-Square) | Unlimited L.A |
| 2015 | "Sexy Rosey (Remix)" (Flavour N'abania featuring P-Square) | Godfather Productions |

== Notes ==
- "Chop My Money" featuring Akon and May D was co-directed by Ben Marc.
- "Alingo" was co-directed by Clarence Peters.
