= The Headies Award for Best Collaboration =

Nigerian music award

- Awarded for: Best R&B, Pop or Hip-hop collaborative track (including cameos)
- Country: Nigeria
- Presented by: Hip Hop World Magazine
- First award: 2006
- Final award: 2019
- Website: theheadies.com

The Headies Award for Best Collaboration (also called Best Collabo) is an award presented at The Headies, a ceremony that was established in 2006 and originally called the Hip Hop World Awards. (Note: The nominees for the 2006 edition are not included in the Recipients table because they are not available.) It was first presented to 2Shotz and Big Lo in 2006.

== Recipients ==
Best Collaboration
Year	Nominees	Result
2020	"Know You" – Ladipoe (featuring Simi)	Won
2020	"Nobody" – DJ Neptune(featuring Joeboy, Mr Eazi)	Nominated
2020	"Sweet in the middle" – Davido(featuring Naira Marley, Zlatan & Wurld)	Nominated
2020	"Totori" – ID Cabasa(featuring Wizkid, Olamide)	Nominated
2020	"Get the Info" – Phyno(featuring Phenom, Falz)	Nominated
2019	"Killin Dem" – Burna Boy (featuring Zlatan Ibile)	Won
2019	"Like" – Reekado Banks (featuring Tiwa Savage, Fiokee)	Nominated
2019	"One Ticket" – Kizz Daniel (featuring Davido)	Nominated
2019	"Fake Love" – Starboy (featuring Duncan Mighty, Wizkid)	Nominated
2019	"Amaka" – 2Baba (featuring Peruzzi)	Nominated
2018	"Ma Lo" – Tiwa Savage (featuring Wizkid)	Won
2018	"Temper" (Remix) – Skales (featuring Burna Boy)	Nominated
2018	"Juice" – Ycee (featuring Maleek Berry)	Nominated
2018	"No Forget" – Adekunle Gold (featuring Simi)	Nominated
2018	"Come Closer" – Wizkid (featuring Drake)	Nominated
2016	"Soldier" – Falz (featuring Simi)	Won
2016	"Reggae Blues" – Harrysong (featuring Orezi, Iyanya, Olamide and Kcee)	Nominated
2016	"Osinachi" (Remix) – Humblesmith (featuring Davido)	Nominated
2016	"Wait" – Solid Star (featuring Tiwa Savage)	Nominated
2016	"No Kissing Baby" – Patoranking (featuring Sarkodie)	Nominated
2016	"Money" – Timaya (featuring Flavour)	
2015	"Local Rappers" – Reminisce (featuring Olamide & Phyno)	Won
2015	"Bad Girl Special (Remix)" – Mr 2Kay (featuring Cynthia Morgan & Seyi Shay)	Nominated
2015	"Do The Right Thing" – Cobhams Asuquo (featuring Bez)	Nominated
2015	"Hold On" – Joe El (featuring 2Baba)	Nominated
2015	"Sisi" – Praiz (featuring Wizkid)	Nominated
2015	"Shoki (Remix)" – Lil Kesh (featuring Olamide & Davido)	Nominated
2014	"Emergency" – WizzyPro (featuring Skales, Patoranking and Runtown)	Won
2014	"Oya Now" – Joe EL (featuring Oritse Femi)	Nominated
2014	"Surulere" – Dr SID (featuring Don Jazzy)	Nominated
2014	"Pass You By" – Black Magic (featuring Oritse Femi)	Nominated
2014	"Girlie O" (Remix) – Patoranking (featuring Tiwa Savage)	Nominated
2014	"Dorobucci" – The Mavins	Nominated
2013	"Ghost Mode" – Phyno (featuring Olamide)	Won
2013	"Tony Montana" (Remix) – Naeto C (featuring D'banj)	Nominated
2013	"Baddest Boy" – E.M.E (featuring Wizkid, Skales, and Banky W.)	Nominated
2013	"Eziokwu" – Lynxxx (featuring Ikechukwu, Illbliss, and Phyno)	Nominated
2013	"Emi Ni Baller" – Chidinma (featuring Suspect and Illbliss)	Nominated
2013	"Baby Mi Da (Remix)" – DR. Victor Olaiya (featuring 2Baba)	Nominated
2012	"Orobo" – Sound Sultan (featuring Excel and Flavour N'abania)	Won
2012	"Stupid Song" – Bez (featuring Praiz)	Nominated
2012	"Carolina" - Sauce Kid (featuring Davido)	Nominated
2012	"Angeli" – Vector (featuring 9ice)	Nominated
2012	"Chop My Money" – P-Square (featuring Akon and May D)	Nominated
2011	"Number One" – M.I (featuring Flavour N'abania)	Won
2011	"Oleku" – Ice Prince (featuring Brymo)	Nominated
2011	"Joor Oh" (Remix) – Jahbless (featuring Ice Prince, Durella, Reminisce, and eLDee)	Nominated
2011	"Facebook Love" – Essence (featuring Jaywon)	Nominated
2011	"You Know it" – Goldie (featuring eLDee)	Nominated
2010	"Kokoroko" – Kefee (featuring Timaya)	Won
2010	"Finest" – Knight House (featuring Sauce Kid and Teeto)	Nominated
2010	"Aye Po Gan" – Illbliss (featuring Terry G)	Nominated
2010	"Sample Remix" – Terry Tha Rapman (featuring Stereo Man and Pherowshuz)	Nominated
2009	"Good or Bad" – J. Martins (featuring Timaya and P-Square)	Won
2009	"Bush Meat" – Sound Sultan (featuring 2Baba and W4)	Nominated
2009	"E Fi Mi Sile" – YQ (featuring Da Grin)	Nominated
2009	"Le Fenu So" – Lord of Ajasa (featuring 9ice)	Nominated
2009	"Street Credibility" – 9ice (featuring 2Baba)	Nominated
2008	"Stylee" – DJ Jimmy Jatt, Mode 9, 2Baba & Elajoe	Won
2008	"Ruggedy Baba" – Ruggedman	Nominated
2008	"Lorile" – X-Project	Nominated
2008	"Yahoozey" – Olu Maintain	Nominated
2008	"Booty Call" – Mo Hits All Stars	Nominated
2006	"Delicious" (Remix) – 2Shotz (featuring Big Lo)	Won

== Category records ==
Most wins

Rank	1st	2nd
Artist	Phyno; Olamide; Timaya; Flavour	Burna Boy; Zlatan Ibile; Tiwa Savage; Simi; Falz; Wizkid; Patoranking; Skales; Runtown; Mode 9; 2Baba; Ruggedman; 2Shotz; DJ Jimmy Jatt; J. Martins; P-Square; Kefee; M.I; Big Lo; Elajoe; Sound Sultan
Total wins	2 Wins	1 win

Most nominations

Rank	1st	2nd	3rd
Artist	2Baba	Wizkid	Olamide; Tiwa Savage; Davido
Total noms	6 nominations	5 nominations	4 nominations
