= 7th Headies Awards =

Nigerian music industry awards

The Headies 2012
- Date: 20 October 2012
- Location: Eko Hotel and Suites; Victoria Island, Lagos
- Country: Nigeria
- Hosted by: M.I and Omawumi
- Most awards: Wizkid, Vector (2 each)
- Most nominations: P-Square, Bez (6 each)
- Website: theheadies.com

Television/radio coverage
- Network: HipTV

The Headies 2012 was the 7th edition of The Headies (known as the Hip Hop World Awards until the 6th edition). It was hosted by M.I and Omawumi. The ceremony took place on 20 October 2012, at the Eko Hotel and Suites in Victoria Island, Lagos. The aforementioned hosts thrilled fans with their song titled "The Headies". Chidinma opened the show by performing her song "Kedike". The Okoye brothers (Peter, Paul, and Jude) won a total of three awards. The Artiste of the Year award went to Wizkid. Tiwa Savage and Wande Coal won the Best Male and Female Vocal Performance categories, respectively. Vector won the Best Rap Single and Lyricist on the Roll plaques for "Angeli". Davido won the Next Rated category and was later awarded a Hyundai Sonata. The Headies celebrated the reunion of prominent Nigerian musicians from the 80s and 90s, including Onyeka Onwenu, Oris Wiliki, Mike Okori, Baba Fryo, Shina Peters, Fatai Rolling Dollar and Daddy Showkey. Femi Kuti was honored with the Hall of Fame award.

== Nomination and entries ==
Nigerian artists who wanted to be considered for nomination were told to submit three audio CDs, four DVDs, a mini DV tape, soft copies of their profile, and a portrait picture to the award’s secretariat. Submission of entries commenced on 4 June and ended on 30 June 2012. Music content released between March 2011 and February 2012 were eligible for entry.

P-Square and Bez received the most nominations with six each. Wizkid, Davido and Ice Prince were tied for second place with four each.

== Activities ==
Every year, our target is to surpass our very best efforts. With notable artistes such as Femi Kuti and many more gracing The Headies this year, our fans should expect to watch the most exciting awards ceremony to be held in recent times.

— Ayo Animashaun

=== Veterans Night ===
The 2013 edition of Veterans Night, a black tie event that honors and celebrates Nigerian musicians of the past, was held at the Grand Ballroom of the Eko Hotel and Suites on 19 October 2012. Artists and personalities recognized that night include Caleb Olumese, Tony Okoroji, Daniel Wilson, Oritz Wiliki, Chris Okotie, Daddy Fresh, Stella Monye, Baba Fryo, Edi Lawani, Easy K, Pretty, Fellyx, Alex Zitto, Edmund Spice, Ras Kimono, Majek Fashek, Mandators, Edna Ogoli, Bongos Ike, Onyeka Onwenu, K1 De Ultimate, Mike Okra and Blackky.

=== Help the Children campaign ===
As part of its Corporate Social Responsibility philosophy, The Headies donated clothes and other materials to kids in need. The 2012 campaign helped children living in the Ajegunle and Makoko Riverine communities.

== Performers ==
Artist(s)	Song(s)
Chidinma	"Kedike"
Eva Alordiah	"High"
Bez	"Stupid Song" (with Praiz)
Timi Dakolo	"Great Nation"
Burna Boy	"Like to Party"
Dammy Krane	
Davido	"Dami Duro"
Chuddy K	"Gaga Crazy"
Brymo	"Ara"

== Winners and nominees ==
Best R&B/Pop Album	Best Rap Album
Superstar – Wizkid; Super Sun – Bez; Versus – 9ice; The Invasion – P-Square (Winner)	Everybody Loves Ice Prince – Ice Prince (Winner); The Dreamer Project – Show Dem Camp; Rapsodi – Olamide; Super C Season – Naeto C
Best R&B Single	Best Pop Single
"Private Trips" – Wande Coal; "That Stupid Song" – Bez (featuring Praiz); "Nawti" – Olu Maintain; "Soundtrack" – May D (Winner); "Love Me (3x)" – Tiwa Savage	"Dami Duro" – Davido; "Oliver Twist" – D'banj; "Gaga Crazy" – Chuddy K; "Chop My Money" – P-Square; "Kukere" – Iyanya (Winner)
Best Vocal Performance (Male)	Best Vocal Performance (Female)
Wande Coal – "Private Trips" (Winner); Banky W. – "Low Key"; Praiz – "I Love You"; Brymo – "Ara"; Bez – "Stupid Song"	"Love Me (3x)" – Tiwa Savage (Winner); Chidinma – "Kedike"; Ijeoma – "Oloomi"; Waje – "Na The Way"
Best Rap Single	Best Street-Hop Artiste
"Too Much Money" – Iceberg Slim; "Shutdown" – Phyno; "Angeli" – Vector (featuring 9ice) (Winner); "Oh My Gosh" – Yung6ix; "Young Erikina" – Olamide	Reminisce – "Kako Bi Chicken"; Chuddy K – "Gaga Crazy" (Winner); Terry G – "Akpako"; Rayce – "Roll"; Erigga – "Mo Street Gan"
Best Collabo	Lyricist on the Roll
"Chop My Money" – P-Square (featuring Akon and May D); "Angeli" – Vector (featuring 9ice); "Carolina" - Sauce Kid (Sauce Kid featuring Davido); "Stupid Song" – Bez (featuring Praiz); "Orobo" – Sound Sultan (featuring Excel and Flavour N'abania) (Winner)	Vector – "Angeli" (Winner); Yung6ix – "Oh My Gosh"; Iceberg Slim – "Too Much Money"; Phyno – "Shutdown"; Erigga – "Mo Street Gan"
Song of the Year	Best Recording of the Year
"Chop My Money" – P-Square (featuring Akon and May D); "Dami Duro" – Davido; "Oliver Twist" – D'banj (Winner); "Gaga Crazy" – Chuddy K; "Kukere" – Iyanya	"Stupid Song" – Bez; "Private Trips" – Wande Coal; "Ara" – Brymo (Winner); "I Love You" – Praiz
Album of the Year	Artiste of the Year
Everybody Loves Ice Prince – Ice Prince; The Invasion – P-Square (Winner); Superstar – Wizkid; Super C Season – Naeto C	P-Square; Wizkid (Winner); Ice Prince; Naeto C; D'banj
Producer of the Year	Best Music Video
Cobhams Asuquo – "Stupid Song"; Tee-Y Mix - Super C Season (Winner); Shizzi – "Dami Duro"; Jay Sleek – "Private Trips"; Jesse Jagz – Everybody Loves Ice Prince	"5 & 6" – Clarence Peters; "Chop My Money" – Jude Okoye (Winner); "Ara" – Ajeh; "Kosorombe" – Mex
Next Rated	African Artiste of the Year
Davido (Winner); Eva Alordiah; Praiz; Chuddy K	(Ghana) Sarkodie – "Azonto" (Winner); (Kenya) Camp Mulla – "Feel No Pain"; (Ghana) D-Black – "Get On The Dancefloor"; (South Africa) Zahara – "Loliwe"
Hip Hop World Revelation of the Year	Hall of Fame
Wizkid (Winner); Ice Prince; Bez; Timi Dakolo; Olamide	Femi Kuti
