= The Headies Award for Album of the Year =

Nigerian music industry award

- Awarded for: Best album released by a solo artist or group in year under review, that meets judges requirements of excellence and acceptability
- Country: Nigeria
- Presented by: Hip Hop World Magazine
- First award: 2006
- Final award: 2020
- Website: theheadies.com

The Headies Award for Album of the Year is an award presented at The Headies, a ceremony that was established in 2006 and originally called the Hip Hop World Awards. (Note: The nominees for the 2006 edition are not included in the Recipients table because they are not available.) It was first awarded to Get Squared in 2006.

== Recipients ==
Album of the Year
Year	Nominees	Result	Ref
2020	Apollo – Fireboy DML	Won	
2020	African Giant – Burna Boy	Nominated	
2020	Afro Pop Vol. 1 – Adekunle Gold	Nominated	
2020	Yellow – Brymo	Nominated	
2020	Boo of the Booless – Chike	Nominated	
2019	Moral Instruction by Falz	Won	
2019	About 30 by Adekunle Gold	Nominated	
2019	Outside by Burna Boy	Nominated	
2019	No Bad Songz by Kizz Daniel	Nominated	
2018	Simisola by Simi	Won	
2018	Gold by Adekunle Gold	Nominated	
2018	Klĭtôrĭs by Brymo	Nominated	
2018	Ijele the Traveler by Flavour	Nominated	
2018	Sounds from the Other Side by Wizkid	Nominated	
2018	The Playmaker by Phyno	Nominated	
2016	New Era by Kizz Daniel	Won	
2016	Stories That Touch by Falz	Nominated	
2016	Wanted by Wande Coal	Nominated	
2016	Seyi or Shay by Seyi Shay	Nominated	
2015	Street OT by Olamide	Won	
2015	The Chairman by M.I	Nominated	
2015	Ayo by Wizkid	Nominated	
2015	Double Trouble by P-Square	Nominated	
2015	Rich & Famous by Praiz	Nominated	
2015	King of Queens by Yemi Alade	Nominated	
2014	Baddest Guy Ever Liveth by Olamide	Won	
2014	The Journey by Sean Tizzle	Nominated	
2014	L.I.F.E by Burna Boy	Nominated	
2014	No Guts No Glory by Phyno	Nominated	
2013	YBNL by Olamide	Won	
2013	Desire by Iyanya	Nominated	
2013	Omo Baba Olowo by Davido	Nominated	
2013	R&BW by Banky W.	Nominated	
2013	Blessed by Flavour N'abania	Nominated	
2012	The Invasion by P-Square	Won	
2012	Everybody Loves Ice Prince by Ice Prince	Nominated	
2012	Superstar by WizKid	Nominated	
2012	Super C Season by Naeto C	Nominated	
2011	The Unstoppable International Edition by 2face Idibia	Won	
2011	MI 2 by M.I	Nominated	
2011	Back From the Future by Sound Sultan	Nominated	
2011	Turning Point by Dr SID	Nominated	
2011	Beautiful Imperfection by Aṣa	Nominated	
2010	Mushin 2 Mo'Hits by Wande Coal	Won	
2010	C.E.O by Da Grin	Nominated	
2010	Un-darey-ted by Darey	Nominated	
2010	Danger by P-Square	Nominated	
2010	Least Expected by Bracket	Nominated	
2009	Street Credibility by 9ice	Won	
2009	The Entertainer by D'banj	Nominated	
2009	Paradigm Shift by Mode 9	Nominated	
2009	Talk About It by M.I	Nominated	
2009	The Unstoppable by 2face Idibia	Nominated	
2008	Aṣa by Aṣa	Won	
2008	Game Over by P-Square	Nominated	
2008	Grass 2 Grace by 2face Idibia	Nominated	
2008	E Pluribus Unum by Mode 9	Nominated	
2008	Independent by Faze	Nominated	
2007	Hitsville by Paul Play	Won	
2007	Free at Last by FreeStyle	Nominated	
2007	After Da Storm by Weird MC	Nominated	
2006	Get Squared by P-Square	Won	

== Category records ==
Most wins

Rank	1st	2nd	3rd
Artist	Olamide	P-Square	2face Idibia; Aṣa; 9ice Wande Coal; Paul Play; Simi; Kizz Daniel; Falz
Total wins	3 wins	2 wins	1 win

Most nominations

Rank	1st	2nd	3rd	
Artist	P-Square	Wizkid	Olamide; M.I; 2face Idibia; Burna boy	Aṣa; Mode 9 Phyno; Flavour N'abania; Wande Coal; Kizz Daniel; Adekunle Gold; Falz
Total noms	5 nominations	4 nominations	3 nominations	2 nominations
