= 5th Headies Awards =

Nigerian music industry awards

The Headies 2010
- Date: May 29, 2010
- Location: Eko Hotel and Suites; Victoria Island, Lagos
- Country: Nigeria
- Hosted by: None
- Most awards: Wande Coal (5)
- Most nominations: Wande Coal (7)
- Website: theheadies.com

Television/radio coverage
- Network: HipTV

The fifth edition of the Hip Hop World Awards took place on May 29, 2010, at the Eko Hotel and Suites in Victoria Island, Lagos. The ceremony was conducted without a host. Wande Coal was the biggest winner of the night with five plaques, including Artiste of the Year. Don Jazzy won the Producer of the Year award. Hip hop duo Skuki won the Next Rated category. Da Grin's C.E.O won for Best Rap Album in a posthumous fashion. He was also honored by General Pype during the singer's performance.

== Performers ==
- Goldie Harvey
- Obiwon
- Ark Quake – "Alanta"
- D'Prince
- Wande Coal
- General Pype

== Winners and nominees ==
=== Album of the Year ===
- C.E.O – Da Grin
- Mushin 2 Mo'Hits – Wande Coal (Winner)
- Un-darey-ted – Darey
- Danger – P-Square
- Least Expected – Bracket

=== Artiste of the Year ===
- Wande Coal (Winner)
- Terry G
- Darey
- Bracket
- Da Grin

=== Song of the Year ===
- "Yori Yori" – Bracket (Winner)
- "Kokoroko" – Kefee (featuring Timaya)
- "You Bad" – Wande Coal (featuring D'banj)
- "Free Madness Pt.2" – Terry G
- "Alanta" – Art Quake

=== Recording of the Year ===
- "Strong Ting" – Banky W.
- "I Love You" – P-Square
- "Heaven Please" – Timi Dakolo (Winner)
- "Keeper of My Dreams" – Lara George

=== Producer of the Year ===
- Tee-Y Mix
- Cobhams Asuquo
- Don Jazzy (Winner)
- Sossick
- Dokta Frabz

=== Best Music Video Director ===
- Jude Okoye – "Danger"
- Wudi Awa – "Kokoroko"
- Clarence Peters – "Finest" (Winner)
- Bobby Boulders – "Ako Mi Ti Poju"
- MEX – "Safe"

=== Best R&B Single ===
- "Strong Ting" – Banky W. (Winner)
- "Never Felt A Love" – Capital Femi
- "I Love You" – P-Square
- "No Stars" – Darey
- "Overkillin" – Djinee

=== Best Pop Single ===
- "Yori Yori" – Bracket
- "You Bad" – Wande Coal (featuring D'banj) (Winner)
- "Kokoroko" – Kefee (featuring Timaya)
- "Danger" – P-Square
- "Hotter than Fire" – Dr. Pat and Sheyman

=== Best R&B/Pop Album ===
- Mushin 2 Mo'Hits – Wande Coal (Winner)
- Danger – P-Square
- Least Expected – Bracket
- Un-darey-ted – Darey

=== Best Rap Single ===
- "Ako Mi Ti Poju" – Naeto C
- "Owo Ati Swagger" – Cartiair
- "Finest" – Knight House (featuring Sauce Kid and Teeto)
- "Sample" (Remix) – Terry Tha Rapman (featuring Stereo Man and Pherowshuz) (Winner)
- "Somebody Wants to Die" – M.I

=== Best Rap Album ===
- C.E.O – Da Grin (Winner)
- Dat Ibo Boy – Illbliss
- More Than Rap Music – Cartiair
- The Investment – Kel

=== Lyricist on the Roll ===
- M.I – "Somebody Wants to Die"
- Mode 9 – "Bad Man" (Winner)
- OD – "Got to Love Me"
- Pherowshuz – "Sample" (Remix) – Terry Tha Rapman (featuring Stereo Man and Pherowshuz)

=== Best Collaboration ===
- "Kokoroko" – Kefee (featuring Timaya) (Winner)
- "Finest" – Knight House (featuring Sauce Kid and Teeto)
- "Aye Po Gan" – Illbliss (featuring Terry G)
- "Sample Remix" – Terry Tha Rapman (featuring Stereo Man and Pherowshuz)

=== Best Male Vocal Performance ===
- Darey – "No Stars" (Winner)
- Banky W. – "Strong Ting"
- Wande Coal – "Banana"
- GT the Guitarman – "Kinimatise"
- Timi Dakolo – "Heaven Please"

=== Best Female Vocal Performance ===
- Ibiyemi – "Don't Leave Me"
- Kefee – "Kokoroko"
- Lara George – "Keeper of my Dreams" (Winner)
- Waje – "Kolo"
- Eva Alordiah – "No Cry"

=== Best Street Hop Artiste ===
- Terry G – "Free Madness Pt.2" (Winner)
- Klever J (featuring Eedris Abdulkareem) – "Igboro Ti Daru"
- Jaywon – "File Be"
- Art Quake – "Alanta"
- Side One – "One by One"

=== Next Rated ===
- General Pype – "Champion"
- Mo'Cheddah –
- Jesse Jagz – "Wetin Dey"
- D'Prince – "Omoba"
- Skuki – "Banger" (Winner)

=== Hip Hop World Revelation of the Year ===
- Wande Coal (Winner)
- Kel
- Djinee
- Illbliss
- Omawumi
