= Greatest Hits (P-Square album) =

Greatest hits album by P-Square
- Released: 5 May 2013
- Genre: R&B; Afropop; Afrobeats
- Label: Square Records

P-Square chronology
The Invasion (2012)	Greatest Hits (2013)	Double Trouble (2014)

Singles from Greatest Hits
- 1. "Alingo" Released: 15 August 2012

Greatest Hits is the first greatest hits album by Nigerian duo P-Square. It was released on 5 May 2013, by Square Records. The album produced one new single "Alingo", which was released on 15 August 2012 and appeared on the duo's sixth studio album Double Trouble (2014). Other songs on the album include "No One Like You", "Do Me", "Chop My Money", "Beautiful Onyinye", "E No Easy", "Danger", "Ifunanya", "Temptation", and "Bizzy Body".

== Singles ==
"Alingo", the album's only single, was released on 15 August 2012. It later appeared as a bonus track on the duo's sixth studio album Double Trouble (2014). P-Square recorded the song prior to the Love AfroBeats Festival, which occurred at the Hammersmith Apollo in London. "Alingo" peaked at number 1 on MTV Base's Official Naija Top 10 Chart from 22 March through 28 March 2013, surpassing 2 Face Idibia's "Ihe Neme". It also peaked at number 1 on Afribiz's Top 100 chart.

== Track listing ==
No.	Title	Writer(s)	Producer(s)	Length
1.	"Alingo"	Peter Okoye; Paul Okoye	Papi Jay	4:31
2.	"Do As I Do" (featuring Tiwa Savage and May D)	Okoye; Okoye; Tiwatope Savage; Akinmayokun Awodumila	P-Square	4:06
3.	"Jeje" (featuring Waje)	Okoye; Okoye; Aituaje Iruobe	P-Square	4:49
4.	"Shake It Down Low" (featuring Muna and Eva Alordiah)	Okoye; Okoye; Munachi Abii; Eva Alordiah	P-Square	3:37
5.	"Chop My Money" (featuring Akon and May D)	Okoye; Okoye; Aliaune Thiam; Awodumila	Fliptyce	4:32
6.	"Mako Fiesta"	Okoye; Okoye	P-Square	3:56
7.	"Bizzy Body (Remix)" (featuring Weird MC)	Okoye; Okoye; Adesola Idowu	P-Square	4:32
8.	"Do Me (Remix)" (featuring Waje)	Okoye	P-Square	4:43
9.	"Game Over"	Okoye; Okoye	P-Square	4:19
10.	"Your Name (Remix)"	Okoye; Okoye	P-Square	4:48
11.	"Why E Be Say"	Okoye; Okoye	P-Square	4:08
12.	"Danger"	Okoye; Okoye	P-Square	4:28
13.	"No One Like You"	Okoye; Okoye	P-Square	4:30
14.	"Ifunanya"	Okoye; Okoye	P-Square	4:28
15.	"Temptation"	Okoye; Okoye	P-Square	5:34
16.	"E No Easy" (featuring J.Martins)	Okoye; Okoye; Justice Martins	J. Martins	4:27
17.	"Beautiful Onyinye"	Okoye; Okoye	P-Square	4:52
Total length:				72:60

== Personnel ==
- Peter Okoye – primary artist
- Paul Okoye – primary artist
- Aituaje Iruobe – featured artist
- Tiwatope Savage – featured artist
- Aliaune Thiam – featured artist
- William Leonard Roberts II – featured artist
- Munachi Abii – featured artist
- Eva Alordiah – featured artist
- Akinmayokun Awodumila – featured artist
- Martins Okey Justice – featured artist
- Jude Engees Okoye – music video director

== Release history ==
Region	Date	Format	Label
Worldwide	5 May 2013	CD, Digital download	Square Records
