= Double Trouble (P-Square album) =

Studio album by P-Square
- Released: 12 September 2014
- Recorded: 2012–2014
- Genres: Afropop; highlife; dance-pop
- Length: 71:13
- Label: Square Records
- Producers: Vtek; Charles Duke; Mecca E; Oscar Heman-Ackah; Rudeboy; Mr. P

P-Square chronology
Greatest Hits (2013)	Double Trouble (2014)

Singles from Double Trouble
- 1. "Ejeajo" Released: 29 August 2014; 2. "Shekini" Released: 29 August 2014; 3. "Bring It On" Released: 29 August 2014; 4. "Collabo" Released: 12 September 2014

Double Trouble is the sixth studio album by Nigerian duo P-Square. It was released by Square Records on 12 September 2014. The album features guest appearances from T.I., Don Jazzy, Awilo Longomba, Jermaine Jackson, and Dave Scott. Its production was handled by Vtek, Charles Duke, Mecca E, Oscar, Rudeboy, and Mr. P. Double Trouble yielded the singles "Alingo", "Personally", "Testimony", "Ejeajo", "Shekini", "Bring It On", and "Collabo".

== Background and promotion ==
P-Square revealed the album's cover art and track list on 7 September 2014. The album features contributions from T.I., Don Jazzy, Awilo Longomba, Jermaine Jackson, and Dave Scott. Its production was handled by Vtek, Charles Duke, Mecca E, Oscar, Rudeboy, and Mr. P.

=== Bonus releases ===
The bonus track "Alingo" was released on 15 August 2012. It was produced by Pappi-J and blends EDM with contemporary African sounds. The music video for "Alingo" was directed by Jude Engees Okoye and Clarence Peters. It won Most Gifted African (West) Video and was nominated for Most Gifted Video of the Year at the 2013 Channel O Music Video Awards. Okoye and Peters won the Best Music Video award at The Headies 2013 for "Alingo". On 23 January 2013, the Nigerian Broadcasting Commission banned the music video for "Alingo", along with videos of other popular tracks.

The bonus track "Personally", which Vtek produced, was released on 20 June 2013. The song's accompanying music video was released on Vevo the following day. Directed by Okoye and Peters, the video pays tribute to American singer Michael Jackson and features a cameo appearance by Nollywood actor Osita Iheme. By August 2015, the video surpassed 50 million views on YouTube, and was nominated for Most Gifted Dance Video at the 2014 Channel O Music Video Awards. "Taste the Money (Testimony)", another bonus track, was released on 11 February 2014. The music video for "Taste the Money (Testimony)" was directed by Okoye and filmed in South Africa on 8 May 2014.

=== Singles ===
The album's first three singles, "Ejeajo", "Shekini", and "Bring It On", were simultaneously released on 29 August 2014. The lead single, "Ejeajo", was produced by Vtek and features a rap verse by American rapper T.I.. The accompanying music video for the song was directed by Okoye and Peters. The second single, "Shekini", was also produced by Vtek; its music video was directed by Peters and released on 17 November 2014. The third single, "Bring It On", was produced by Rudeboy and features vocals by Dave Scott. The song's music video was directed by Peters and filmed in Atlanta and South Africa.

Don Jazzy lent vocals to the album's fourth single, "Collabo", which was released on September 12, 2014. The song was released concurrently with the album. Produced by Oscar Heman-Ackah, the track made its debut on the MTV Base Official Naija Top Ten chart, peaking at number five. The accompanying music video for "Collabo" was filmed in Cape Town and directed by Okoye and Peters. The video surpassed one million views on YouTube within two weeks of its release.

== Critical reception ==
Double Trouble received generally mixed reviews from music critics. Tola Sarumi of NotJustOk gave the album a rating of 6 out of 10, describing it as a largely predictable record that stays within the duo's comfort zone. Sarumi highlighted "Sari Sari", "Ije Love", and "No Be Joke" as standout tracks, and praised "Collabo" for its catchiness and "Ije Love" for its personal touch. In a review for YNaija, Wilfred Okiche described Double Trouble as a formulaic but enjoyable album that sticks to the duo's tried-and-true methods, blending materialistic themes with catchy beats and party-ready tracks.

A writer for Jaguda, who goes by the moniker Angry Mob, rated the album 3 out of 10. He panned the production and P-Square's songwriting and creative skills. Angry Mob characterized the album as "formulaic, unimaginative, and lyrically shallow", and believes it is "abysmally dismal". Writing for Music in Africa, Oris Aigbokhaevbolo described Double Trouble as a commercial album that prioritizes market appeal over originality, recycling past successes and trends like the Shoki dance and their own hits.

=== Accolades ===
Double Trouble was nominated for Album of the Year and Best R&B/Pop Album at The Headies 2015. It was also nominated for Album of the Year at the 2015 All Africa Music Awards.

== Track listing ==
No.	Title	Writer(s)	Producer(s)	Length
1.	"Shekini"	Peter Okoye; Paul Okoye	Vtek	3:38
2.	"Missing You"	Okoye; Okoye	Mecca E	3:33
3.	"Bring It On" (featuring Dave Scott)	Okoye; Okoye; Dave Scott	Rudeboy	3:59
4.	"MMS (Mugu Money Spender)"	Okoye; Okoye	Charles Duke	4:20
5.	"Ifeoma"	Okoye; Okoye	Rudeboy	4:07
6.	"Ejeajo" (featuring T.I.)	Okoye; Okoye; Clifford Harris Jr.	Vtek	5:00
7.	"Collabo" (featuring Don Jazzy)	Okoye; Okoye; Michael Ajereh	Oscar Heman-Ackah	3:43
8.	"Ogadigide"	Okoye; Okoye	Charles Duke	4:12
9.	"No Be Joke"	Okoye; Okoye	Vtek	3:50
10.	"Enemy Solo" (featuring Awilo Longomba)	Okoye; Okoye; Albert Longomba	Vtek	5:00
11.	"Sari Sari"	Okoye; Okoye	Rudeboy	4:11
12.	"Zombie" (featuring Jermaine Jackson)	Okoye; Okoye; Jermaine Jackson	Mr P	5:04
13.	"Ije Love"	Okoye; Okoye	Vtek	4:11

Bonus tracks
No.	Title	Writer(s)	Producer(s)	Length
14.	"Taste the Money (Testimony)"	Okoye; Okoye	Rudeboy	4:20
15.	"Personally"	Okoye; Okoye	Vtek	3:14
16.	"Alingo"	Okoye; Okoye	Pappi-J	4:31

== Personnel ==
- Paul and Peter Okoye – executive production
- Jude Engees Okoye – management, video director
- Vtek – production, mixing, mastering
- Charles Duke – production
- Mecca E – production
- Oscar – production
- Pappi-J - production
- George Nathaniel – mixing, mastering
- Kelechi Amadi-Obi – photography
- Abinibi – album art

== Release history ==
Country/Digital platform	Date	Version	Format	Label
Nigeria; iTunes; Spinlet	12 September 2014	Standard	CD; digital download	Square Records
