= MTV Africa Music Awards 2015 =

Awards show

- Date: 18 July 2015
- Location: Durban International Convention Centre, KwaZulu-Natal, South Africa
- Hosted by: Anthony Anderson

Television/radio coverage
- Network: MTV, MTV Base

The 2015 edition of the MTV Africa Music Awards took place on 18 July 2015, at the Durban International Convention Centre (ICC Arena). The awards aired live across Africa on MTV Base, MTV and BET and transmitted worldwide on partner stations and content platforms including BET International. The event was sponsored by KwaZulu-Natal in association with Absolut Vodka and in partnership with The City of Durban and was hosted by Anthony Anderson.

A new category was announced starting the 2015 awards event. Called "MAMA Evolution award", a new category honouring established artists who have made an indelible mark on African and global music culture, taken African music to new territories around the world, pushed the boundaries of creativity, and shaped the soundscape of contemporary Africa, it was won by D'Banj. The important "Artist of the Decade" award was won by P-Square.

Live performances included Bucie, Davido, Diamond Platnumz, Yemi Alade, Cassper Nyovest, Ne-Yo, Jhené Aiko and Young Thug.

== Winners ==
- Best Female: Yemi Alade (Nigeria)
- Best Male: Davido (Nigeria)
- Best Group: P-Square (Nigeria)
- Best New Act Transformed by Absolut: Patoranking (Nigeria)
- Best Hip Hop: Cassper Nyovest (South Africa)
- Best Collaboration: AKA, Burna Boy, Da L.E.S & JR: "All Eyes On Me" (South Africa/Nigeria)
- Song of the Year: Mavins: "Dorobucci" (Nigeria)
- Best Live: Diamond Platnumz (Tanzania)
- Video of the Year: "Nafukwa" – Riky Rick; Director: Adriaan Louw
- Best Pop & Alternative: Jeremy Loops (South Africa)
- Best Francophone: DJ Arafat (Ivory Coast)
- Best Lusophone: Ary (Angola)
- Personality of the Year: Trevor Noah (South Africa)
- MAMA Evolution: D'Banj (Nigeria)
- Best International: Nicki Minaj
  - Other nominations: Beyoncé, Big Sean, Chris Brown, Rihanna
- Artist of the Decade: P-Square
- MTV Base Leadership Award: Saran Kaba Jones & S’Bu Mavundla
