= 4th Headies Awards =

Nigerian music industry awards

- Date: May 16, 2009
- Location: International Conference Centre, Abuja
- Country: Nigeria
- Hosted by: Banky W. and Kemi Adetiba
- Most awards: 9ice (3)
- Most nominations: 9ice (6)
- Website: theheadies.com

Television/radio coverage
- Network: HipTV

The 4th Headies Awards, commonly known as the 2008 Hip Hop World Awards, took place on May 16, 2009, at the International Conference Centre in Abuja, Nigeria. It was hosted by Banky W. and Kemi Adetiba. The awards ceremony was held outside of Lagos for the first time. 9ice won a total of three awards from six nominations.

== Winners and nominees ==
| Best R&B/Pop Album | Best Rap Album |
|---|---|
| The Entertainer – D'banj; The Unstoppable – 2 Face Idibia; Etcetera – Etcetera; Gongo Aso – 9ice (Winner); Mr Capable – Banky W. | Talk About It – M.I (Winner); Paradigm Shift – Mode 9; Second Turning by the Right – Lord of Ajasa; U Know My "P" – Naeto C |
| Song of the Year | Best Rap Single |
| "Fall in Love" – D'banj; "Incase U Never Know" – 2Shotz (featuring Timaya); "Gongo Aso" – 9ice (Winner); "Good or Bad" – J. Martins (featuring Timaya and P-Square) | "Safe" – M.I (featuring Djinee); "Talking to You" – Mode 9 (featuring Banky W.); "Wa Wa Alright" – Kel; "Kini Big Deal" – Naeto C (Winner) |
| Album of the Year | Best Reggae and Dancehall Album |
| The Entertainer – D'banj; Street Credibility – 9ice (Winner); Paradigm Shift – Mode 9; Talk About It – M.I; The Unstoppable – 2 Face Idibia | Gift and Grace – Timaya (Winner); Me Musiq and I – Blackface; Ichiban – Chakka Da' Souljah; My Shine – Black Solo |
| Best Vocal Performance (Male) | Best Vocal Performance (Female) |
| Darey – "Not the Girl"; Banky W. – "Don't Break My Heart" (Winner); Etcetera – "Michelle"; Wande Coal – "Taboo" | Omawumi – "In the Music" (Winner); Nikki Laoye – "Never Felt This Way"; Waje – "Somewhere" |
| Best Street-Hop Artiste | Lyricist on the Roll |
| Lord of Ajasa – "Esa Lo Ba De"; Da Grin – "Pon Pon Pon"; Dj Zeez – "4 Ka Si Se" (Winner); YQ – "E Fi Mi Le" | Mode 9 – "Nine" (Winner); M.I – "Talk About It"; Lord of Ajasa – "Esa Lo Ba De"; Da Grin – "Pon Pon Pon" |
| Hip Hop World Revelation of the Year | Next Rated |
| M.I (Winner); Banky W.; Naeto C; Nikki Laoye | YQ – "E Fi Mi Sile"; MP – "Pasa Pasa"; Kel – "Wa Wa Alright"; Djinee – "Lade"; Omawumi – "In the Music" (Winner) |
| Best Collaboration | Best Music Video |
| "Street Credibility" – 9ice (featuring 2 Face Idibia); "Le Fenu So" – Lord Of Ajasa (featuring 9ice); "Good or Bad" – J. Martins (featuring Timaya and P-Square) (Winner); "E Fi Mi Sile" – YQ (featuring Da Grin); "Bush Meat" – Sound Sultan (featuring 2 Face Idibia and W4) | "Bo Si Gban Gba" – Alfonso Dormun; "Roll It" – Jude Okoye (Winner); "Pere" – DJ Tee; "Naija Boy" – Igho |
| Best Recording of the Year | Producer of the Year |
| "Street Credibility" – 9ice (featuring 2 Face Idibia); "Not the Girl" – Darey; "For Mitchell" – Etecetra (Winner); "Can't Do Without You" – 2 Face Idibia (featuring Melissa Briggs) | Tee-Y Mix – "Ki Ni Big Deal"; Don Jazzy – "Fall in Love"; ID Cabasa – "Gongo Aso" (Winner); Terry G – "In Case You Never Know"; Jesse Jagz – "Short Black Boy" |
| African Artiste of the Year | Hall of Fame |
| Buffalo – "Bubble You Bumz"; Tinny – "I Dey Kolo"; (Namibia) The Dogg – "Can You Feel It"; Witness – "Zero" | Phillip Trimnell |
Artiste of the Year
D'banj P-Square Timaya 9ice (Winner)
