= Chapter One (May D album) =

Studio album by May D
- Released: 17 May 2013
- Genre: Afrobeats; R&B; dancehall
- Length: 81:36
- Label: Confam
- Producer: Shizzi; Fliptyce; Pappi J; Oskido; Sossick; UC Praw; Mecca E; Spellz

May D chronology
Chapter One (2013)	Sureboy (2021)

Singles from Chapter One
- 1. "Soundtrack" / "Cool Temper" Released: 13 May 2011; 2. "Ile Ijo" Released: 20 January 2012; 3. "Gat Me High" / "You Want 2 Know Me" Released: 13 May 2012; 4. "Use Me" Released: 13 October 2012; 5. "So Many Tinz" Released: 13 February 2013; 6. "Ur Eyes" Released: 14 May 2013

Chapter One is the debut studio album by Nigerian singer-songwriter May D. It was released on 17 May 2013 by Confam Entertainment, and features guest features from Davido, Kayswitch, Olamide, P-Square, 2Face Idibia, and Oskido. The production was handled from producers such as Fliptyce, Pappi J, Mecca E, Oskido, Sossick, Shizzi, UC Praw, Peter Okoye and Spellz. It housed the singles "Soundtrack", "Cool Temper", "Ile Ijo", "Gat Me High", "You Want 2 Know Me", "Use Me", "So Many Tinz", and "Ur Eyes". Despite the anticipation surrounding its release, Chapter One received mixed reviews from critics, who criticized the album for its lack of originality and cohesiveness.

== Background ==
May D revealed the album's album art and track listing on 6 May 2013.

== Singles ==
Chapter One was supported by several singles, which helped build anticipation for the album's release. The lead singles, "Soundtrack" and "Cool Temper", were both released simultaneously on 13 May 2011, serving as May D's overall debut singles. "Ile Ijo," the second single from the album, was released on 20 January 2012. It was produced by Fliptyce. On 13 May 2012, May D released two singles, "Gat Me High", and "You Want 2 Know Me", the latter featuring P-Square. Both singles served as the third singles from the album. The Sossick-produced "Use Me" was released as the fourth single from the album on 13 October 2012. It served as the first single released by May D after leaving Square Records. "So Many Tinz", the album's fifth single, was released on 13 February 2013 and was produced by Fliptyce. The final single from the album, "Ur Eyes," featuring Davido, was released on 14 May 2013. It was produced by Fliptyce.

== Critical reception ==
Chapter One received mixed reviews from music critics upon its release. Ayomide Tayo of Nigerian Entertainment Today awarded the album a rating of 3 out of 5 stars, criticizing it for its excessive tracklist and cringey lyrical content. Tayo noted that while May D showcased his vocal abilities, the album suffered from inconsistency and lacked a cohesive theme, stating "What’s a book without a story – a bunch of sentences?". Wilfred Okiche of YNaija provided a more nuanced critique, describing Chapter One as an ambitious yet flawed project. The review highlighted a few standout dance tracks but criticized the album for its overall uninspired and monotonous delivery. Despite this, Okiche acknowledged May D's efforts to experiment with different musical styles. He concluded, "[May D] simply takes an easy route that is really not easy at all".

== Track listing ==
Chapter One track listing
No.	Title	Writer(s)	Producer(s)	Length
1.	"Story of My Life"	Akinmayokun Awodumila	Mecca E	3:39
2.	"Fumigate"	Awodumila	Pappi-J	4:13
3.	"Gat Me High"	Awodumila	Shizzi	4:04
4.	"Show Me Your Style"	Awodumila	Shizzi	3:43
5.	"Get Down" (featuring Oskido)	Awodumila; Oscar Mdlongwa	Oskido	4:27
6.	"Ur Eyes" (featuring Davido)	Awodumila; David Adeleke	Fliptyce	4:04
7.	"Ogogoro"	Awodumila	Shizzi	4:11
8.	"Use Me"	Awodumila	Sossick	4:49
9.	"Desire"	Awodumila	Pappi-J	3:30
10.	"Ile Ijo"	Awodumila	Fliptyce	4:00
11.	"Hungry"	Awodumila	Pappi-J	3:48
12.	"Soundtrack"	Awodumila	Pappi-J	4:53
13.	"Kigbe" (featuring Olamide, Kayswitch)	Awodumila; Olamide Adedeji; Kehinde Oyebanjo	UC Praw	4:40
14.	"Cool Temper"	Awodumila	Peter Okoye	4:15
15.	"Suffering & Smiling"	Awodumila	Fliptyce	4:04
16.	"You Want 2 Know Me" (featuring P-Square)	Awodumila; Peter Okoye; Paul Okoye	Fliptyce	4:23
17.	"Take Me To Ur Mother"	Awodumila	Pappi-J	3:25
18.	"So Many Tinz"	Awodumila	Fliptyce	3:55
19.	"Jekajo"	Awodumila	Fliptyce	4:02
20.	"Nobody" (featuring 2Baba)	Awodumila; Innocent Idibia	Spellz	3:31
Total length:				81:36

== Personnel ==
- Fliptyce – production
- Pappi J – production
- Shizzi – production
- Oskido – production
- Spellz – production
- Sossick – production
- Peter Okoye – production
- Mecca E – production
- UC Praw – production

== Release history ==
Region	Date	Format	Label
Nigeria	17 May 2013	CD, digital download	Confam
