= The Headies Award for Artiste of the Year =

Nigerian music industry award

- Awarded for: Most critically and commercially adjudged artiste in the year under review
- Country: Nigeria
- Presented by: Hip Hop World Magazine
- First award: 2006
- Final award: 2018
- Website: theheadies.com

The Headies Award for Artiste of the Year is an award presented at The Headies, a ceremony that was established in 2006 and originally called the Hip Hop World Awards. (Note: The nominees for the 2006 edition are not included in the Recipients table because they are not available.) It was first presented to P-Square in 2006.

== Recipients ==
Artiste of the Year
Year	Nominees	Result
2020	Wizkid	Won
2020	Burna Boy	Nominated
2020	Davido	Nominated
2020	Mayorkun	Nominated
2020	Tiwa Savage	Nominated
2019	Burna Boy	Won
2019	Wizkid	Nominated
2019	Davido	Nominated
2019	Falz	Nominated
2019	Tiwa Savage	Nominated
2018	Davido	Won
2018	Wizkid	Nominated
2018	Olamide	Nominated
2018	Simi	Nominated
2018	Tiwa Savage	Nominated
2016	Wizkid	Won
2016	Tiwa Savage	Nominated
2016	Falz	Nominated
2016	Yemi Alade	Nominated
2016	Olamide	Nominated
2015	Olamide	Won
2015	Davido	Nominated
2015	P-Square	Nominated
2015	Wizkid	Nominated
2015	Yemi Alade	Nominated
2014	Davido	Won
2014	Wizkid	Nominated
2014	Kcee	Nominated
2014	Tiwa Savage	Nominated
2014	Olamide	Nominated
2014	Phyno	Nominated
2014	Flavour N'abania	Nominated
2013	Iyanya	Won
2013	Davido	Nominated
2013	Wizkid	Nominated
2013	Flavour	Nominated
2013	Olamide	Nominated
2013	Ice Prince	Nominated
2012	Wizkid	Won
2012	P-Square	Nominated
2012	Ice Prince	Nominated
2012	Naeto C	Nominated
2012	D'banj	Nominated
2011	2face Idibia	Won
2011	Darey	Nominated
2011	M.I	Nominated
2011	D'banj	Nominated
2011	Duncan Mighty	Nominated
2010	Wande Coal	Won
2010	Terry G	Nominated
2010	Darey	Nominated
2010	Bracket	Nominated
2010	Da Grin	Nominated
2009	9ice	Won
2009	D'banj	Nominated
2009	P-Square	Nominated
2009	Timaya	Nominated
2008	D'banj	Won
2008	2face Idibia	Nominated
2008	P-Square	Nominated
2008	Olu Maintain	Nominated
2007	Paul Play	Won
2007	D'banj	Nominated
2007	Mode 9	Nominated
2007	P-Square	Nominated
2007	Weird MC	Nominated
2006	P-Square	Won

== Category records ==
Most wins

Rank	1st	2nd	3rd
Artist	Wizkid	Davido	2face Idibia; Olamide; 9ice P-Square; D'banj; Wande Coal; Iyanya; Paul Play; Burna Boy
Total wins	4 wins	2 wins	1 win

Most nominations

Rank	1st	2nd	3rd	4th	5th
Artist	Wizkid	P-Square	D'banj; Olamide; Davido; Tiwa Savage	Flavour N'abania; Darey; Yemi Alade; 2face Idibia; Falz; Burna boy	
Total noms	8 nominations	6 nominations	5 nominations	2 nominations	
