= The Invasion (album) =

Studio album by P-Square
- Released: 29 July 2011
- Genres: Afropop; R&B; Europop; reggae; highlife
- Label: Square Records
- Producers: P-Square; Pappy J; Fliptyce; Mecca E

P-Square chronology
| Danger (2009) | The Invasion (2011) | Greatest Hits (2013) |

The Invasion is the fifth studio album by Nigerian musical duo P-Square. It was released on 29 July 2011 by Square Records. The album features guest appearances from Tiwa Savage, Naeto C, Waje, May D, Eva, and Muna.

== Promotion ==
The duo promoted and celebrated the album by putting together a concert called "The Invasion Concert", which was held at the Expo Hall of Eko Hotel in Lagos on 30 July 2011. It featured additional performances from May D, Lynxxx, Eva Alordiah, Muna, 9ice, Ikechukwu, and Bovi.

== Singles ==
The album's two promotional singles, "Bunieya Enu" and "Forever", were released simultaneously on 13 May 2011. "Bunieya Enu" is a fast-tempo track sung in Igbo, while "Forever" interpolates "I Really Like It" by Harlem World.

== Composition ==
=== Musical style ===
The Invasion incorporates a variety of musical styles and themes that is composed of R&B, reggae, hip hop, Europop and contemporary highlife sounds. "Beautiful Onyinye", reminiscent of "No One Like You" off the Game Over (2007), and "Forever" are R&B records that cater to R&B lovers, while "Player" and "Jeje" cater to Europop lovers. "She's Hot" and "Me and My Brother" are reggae riddims that explore the depths of the reggae music genre. "Shake It Down Low" caters to hip hop lovers who are fans of lyrical content and mesmerizing beats.

=== Lyrical themes ===
The album primarily focuses on love, wealth, success, and nightlife. In "Beautiful Onyinye", "Forever" and "She's Hot", P-Square expresses the love, affection and emotional outburst they share with their significant other. In "Chop My Money" and "Me and My Brother", the duo talked about their vast wealth and the blessings that have been bestowed upon them. "Shake It Down Low" and "Do as I Do" celebrate and explore the feelings and excitement of nightlife.

== Critical reception ==
Professional ratings
Review scores
| Source | Rating |
|---|---|
| 360 Nobs | 6.1/10 |
| Leadership | 9/10 |

The Invasion was met with mixed reviews from music critics, with many citing a lack of originality. Others praised its lyrical content, sound, composure and depth. Ayomide Tayo of Nigerian Entertainment Today described The Invasion as lacking innovation, stating, "You can’t teach an old dog a new trick." He criticized the album for relying on "the same old gimmicks" despite its Euro-pop beats and noted it felt "all over the place" with mixed results in experimentation. Tayo concluded that P-Square needed to evolve musically to avoid future irrelevance.

Wilfred Okiche of online Nigerian music magazine YNaija said that The Invasion lacked originality and growth, deeming it "not worthy of their current status", with many songs relying on their past formula. Okiche noted that P-Square's loyal fanbase would still embrace the record despite its shortcomings. 360nobs reviewed the album as a safe yet entertaining album, noting that while the duo showed growth and "put together a P-Square album," it lacked originality and experimentation. Despite some standout tracks like "Chop My Money," "Jeje," and "Shake It Down Low," the album leaned heavily on their established sound, with the verdict being 6.1/10. The review concluded that P-Square "may not have pulled off an Invasion this time around," but they are close to achieving it.

=== Accolades ===
| Year | Awards ceremony | Award description(s) | Results |
|---|---|---|---|
| 2012 | The Headies | Album of the Year | Won |
| 2012 | The Headies | Best R&B/Pop Album | Won |

== Track listing ==
| No. | Title | Writer(s) | Producer(s) | Length |
|---|---|---|---|---|
| 1. | "Beautiful Onyinye" | Peter and Paul Okoye | P-Square | 4:52 |
| 2. | "Chop My Money (I Don't Care)" (featuring May D) | Peter and Paul Okoye; Akinmayokun Awodumila | Fliptyce | 4:32 |
| 3. | "Asamkpokoto" | Peter and Paul Okoye | P-Square | 4:30 |
| 4. | "Do as I Do" (featuring Tiwa Savage and May D) | Peter and Paul Okoye; Tiwatope Savage; Awodumila | P-Square | 4:06 |
| 5. | "Forever" | Peter and Paul Okoye | P-Square | 4:29 |
| 6. | "Me and My Brother" | Peter and Paul Okoye | Mecca E | 4:05 |
| 7. | "Jeje" (featuring Waje) | Peter and Paul Okoye; Aituaje Iruobe | P-Square | 4:49 |
| 8. | "Bunieya Enu" | Peter and Paul Okoye | P-Square | 4:44 |
| 9. | "Ole Buruku" | Peter and Paul Okoye | P-Square | 4:03 |
| 10. | "Player" | Peter and Paul Okoye | P-Square | 4:58 |
| 11. | "She's Hot" (featuring Naeto C) | Peter and Paul Okoye; Naetochukwu Chikwe | P-Square | 4:53 |
| 12. | "Fire" | Peter and Paul Okoye | Pappi J | 4:19 |
| 13. | "Anything" | Peter and Paul Okoye | Mecca E | 3:43 |
| 14. | "Shake It Down Low" (featuring Muna and Eva Alordiah) | Peter and Paul Okoye; Munachi Abii; Eva Alordiah | P-Square | 3:37 |

Notes

- "Ole Buruku" and "She's Hot" feature additional vocals from May D.

== Personnel ==
- Peter Okoye and Paul Okoye – vocals, production
- Tiwatope Savage – vocals
- Naetochukwu Chikwe – vocals
- Munachi Abii – vocals
- Eva Alordiah – vocals
- Akinmayokun Awodumila – vocals
- Jude "Engees" Okoye – video director
- Fliptyce – production
- Pappy J - production
- Mecca E - production

== Release history ==
| Region | Date | Format | Label |
|---|---|---|---|
| Worldwide | 29 July 2011 | CD, digital download | Square Records |
