= Government College Ikorodu =

College in Lagos State, Nigeria

Government model College Ikorodu
- Government College Ikorodu Emblem
- Ikorodu, Lagos; Nigeria

Information
- Established: 21 September 1974
- Nickname: GCI, gciikorodu

Government College Ikorodu is a college founded on 21 September 1974, in Ikorodu, Lagos State, Nigeria.

== History ==
Government College Ikorodu was established on 21 September 1974, as a co-educational secondary school with an initial intake of about 200 students.

These students were transferred from other secondary schools in Lagos state from where they were seconded based on the common entrance examination applications that year. In the first year of the school, it occupied a temporary site on Obafemi Awolowo Way, Ikorodu (then referred to as Agbowa Road). The principal was Olatunde Balogun.

The college was opened on 23 September 1974, by the then Governor of Lagos state, Brigadier Mobolaji Johnson.

The college achieved much in its first five years and was among the five colleges Chief Adeniran Ogunsanya awarded scholarships to when he was commissioner for education in 1975.

== The first 5 Government Colleges ==
The first five Government Colleges in Lagos State as founded in 1974. They were created to compete with the unity schools of the Federal Government known as Federal Government Colleges. The 5 Lagos State Government Colleges are:

- Government College Ikorodu: for the Ikorodu division
- Government College Lagos, Eric More: for the Lagos Island division
- Government College Ketu, Epe: for the Epe division
- Government College Ojo: for Badary division, the original site is now the present day Lagos State University (LASU)
- Government College Agege: for the Lagos Mainland division

== GCIOSA - Government College Ikorodu Old Students Association ==
Membership in the Government College Ikorodu Old Student Association is open to all who attended for at least one academic year.

== Notable alumni ==
- Clarence Peters, videographer, CEO Capital hill record label
