= 2Shotz =

Nigerian rapper, photographer, and filmmaker

- Born: William Orioha; 3 March 1979 (age 47); Surulere, Lagos State, Nigeria
- Education: Lagos State University
- Occupations: Rapper; singer; songwriter; photographer; filmmaker
- Spouse: Precious Jones (m. 2013; sep. 2015)
- Children: 1
- Awards: Best Collaboration at The Headies 2006
- Musical career
- Genre: Hip hop
- Instruments: Vocals
- Years active: 1997–2016
- Label: Umunnamu Music

William Orioha (born 3 March 1979), known professionally as 2Shotz, is a former Nigerian rapper and singer-songwriter who is now a US-based photographer and filmmaker. He won the award for Best Collaboration at The Headies 2006. His debut studio album Pirated Copy was released in 2004. It was supported by three singles: "Carry Am Go", "Odeshi" and "Delicious". 2Shotz's second studio album Original Copy was released in 2005. He released his third studio album Commercial Avenue in 2007. His fourth studio album Music Business was released in 2008. 2Shotz released I am William and Loud Silence as his fifth and sixth studio albums in 2010 and 2016, respectively. He is a hip hop artist who raps in English, Pidgin and Igbo.

== Early life and education ==
2Shotz was born in Surulere, Lagos State, southwestern region of Nigeria, to a family of three members. He is a native of Umuahia, the capital city of Abia State, southeastern Nigeria. He went to Government College Umuahia for his secondary education. 2Shotz graduated with a degree in industrial relations and personnel management from Lagos State University (LASU).

== Music career ==
2Shotz started singing while in secondary school and decided to pursue a career in music prior to enrolling at LASU. In 1999, he teamed up with 2Ply to form the group Foremen. They signed a record deal with eLDee's Trybesmen in 2000 and released their debut album Men at Work under the label. The album was supported by the single "For the Men". 2Shotz signed a solo deal with Trybe Records following the group's disbandment in 2000. He later joined the group The Trybe and recorded the 2001 song "Oya" with them. In 2005, he launched his record label Umunnamu Music. He joined Obi Asika's record label Storm Records a year later, but exited the label to focus on Umunnamu Music. In 2016, he quit music to pursue a career in photography and filmmaking and said he was under-appreciated in Nigeria.

== Personal life ==
2Shotz married his girlfriend, whom he met on Twitter, at the Ikoyi Marriage Registry on 12 April 2013. They have a daughter who was born in Ireland on 12 March 2015. 2Shotz separated from his wife in December 2015 after she accused him of domestic violence.

== Discography ==
=== Studio albums ===
- Pirated Copy (2004)
- Original Copy (2005)
- Commercial Avenue (2007)
- Music Business (2008)
- I AM William (2011)
- Loud Silence (2016)

=== Singles ===
- "Delicious" (2004)
- "Odeshi" (2004)
- "Carry Am Go" (2004)
- "Make Dem Talk" (2006)
- "Which Level" (2007)
- "Incase U Never Know" (2008)

== Awards and nominations ==
Year	Award	Category	Recipient	Result
2011	The Headies	Best Rap Album	I Am William	Nominated
2009	The Headies	Song of the Year	"Incase U Never Know" (featuring Timaya)	Nominated
2006	The Headies	Best Collaboration	"Delicious" (featuring Big Lo)	Won
