= Game Over (P-Square album) =

Studio album by P-Square
- Released: 1 May 2007
- Recorded: 2006–2007
- Genre: Afro-pop; R&B; pop; reggae
- Length: 59:08
- Label: Square Records
- Producer: P-Square

P-Square chronology
Get Squared (2005)	Game Over (2007)	Danger (2009)

Alternative cover
- 2008 re-issued cover

Singles from Game Over
- 1. "Do Me"; 2. "Ifunanya"; 3. "No One Like You"; 4. "More Than a Friend"; 5. "Roll It"

Game Over is the third studio album by the Nigerian duo P-Square. It was released on 1 May 2007, through Square Records. Developed as a visual album, nearly all the songs received a music video. P-Square embraced a new musical direction with the desire to assert its full artistic expression. The album incorporates themes of love, desire, betrayal, regret, assurance, and political criticism. Essentially an R&B and pop album, Game Over also covered genres like reggae and hip hop. The album boasts of singles like "No One Like You," "Roll It," "Ifunanya," and the lead single "Do Me", which featured vocals from Waje. The album was credited for redefining music videos in the African music industry with the singles "Do Me", "Temptation" (Remix), and "Roll It".

Many media outlets and publications have ranked it among the greatest Nigerian album of all time. Urban Central on Medium ranked it number two on the top 24 Nigerian albums between 2007 and 2017.

== Singles ==
- "No One Like You" was released as one of the album's singles. According to Forbes' 40 Most Powerful Celebrities in Africa article, the song has been viewed over 10 million times on YouTube. The music video for the "No One Like You" was shot and directed by the duo's elder brother, Jude Engees Okoye. The song received the most airplay from the album. Wale did a remix to the song in 2011. In 2010, Ugandan reggae duo Radio and Weasel released a song entitled "Zuena"; the song sampled "No One Like You".
- "Do Me" features vocals from Waje, an artist popularly known for her vocals on M.I's "One Naira". The music video for the single was shot in South Africa by Jude Engees Okoye. In a video interview posted on YouTube, P-Square said they spent more money shooting "Do Me" and less on "Beautiful Onyinye".
- The music video for "More Than A Friend" was shot and directed in South Africa by Jude Engees Okoye. The song describes a guy asking the girl he loves to be "more than a friend".
- The music video for "Ifunanya" was shot and directed in South Africa by Jude Engees Okoye. In the Igbo language, "Ifunanya" loosely means "love inspires love". The word is a fusion of "Ife" (love) and "funánya" (one who inspires love).
- "Roll It" was produced by Northside Entertainment and features recording artist, Alaye. The music video for "Roll It" was also shot and directed by Jude Engees Okoye.

== Critical reception ==
A contributor for Nigerian Entertainment Today said that on the album, P-Square "learnt to understand what counts" and stuck to a formula of "repetition, often meaningless poetry, interpolations, sampling and beats that get you off your seats," but added that Game Over had ballads that "passed the test," concluding that it was "certainly one album that was difficult to resist buying" and "even more difficult for one to get it out of their jukebox." Ayomide Tayo of Pulse Nigeria ranked Game Over #1 on their ranking of P-Square's best to worst albums. He wrote that the album showed they had mastered their hit-making formula, calling it "three times the charm" and noting that it confirmed their place at the top, concluding that it was "one of the best pop albums in Nigeria over the last decade."

== Track listing ==
All tracks produced by P-Square and co-produced by J. Martins. Sources:

Game Over standard edition track listing
No.	Title	Writer(s)	Length
1.	"No One Like You"	Paul and Peter Okoye	4:28
2.	"Game Over"	Paul and Peter Okoye	4:17
3.	"Do Me" (featuring Waje)	Paul and Peter Okoye; Aituaje Iruobe	4:41
4.	"Miss U Die"	Paul and Peter Okoye	4:44
5.	"Why E Be Say"	Paul and Peter Okoye	4:06
6.	"More Than A Friend"	Paul and Peter Okoye	4:13
7.	"Am I Still That Special Man?"	Paul and Peter Okoye	3:46
8.	"Ifunanya"	Paul and Peter Okoye	4:26
9.	"Stand Up"	Paul and Peter Okoye	4:28
10.	"Roll It"	Paul and Peter Okoye	4:17
11.	"Game Over (Uncensored)"	Paul and Peter Okoye	4:16
12.	"No One Like U (Instrumental)"	—	4:29
13.	"Do Me (Instrumental)"	—	4:43
14.	"Roll It (Instrumental)"	—	4:14
Total length:			58:68

Reissue bonus tracks
No.	Title	Writer(s)	Length
11.	"Temptation" (remix; featuring Alaye)	Paul and Peter Okoye; Ayotunde Solomon	5:34
12.	"Bizzy Body (Bonus Remix)" (remix; featuring Weird MC)	Paul and Peter Okoye; Adesola Idowu	4:32
Total length:			51:52

Notes

- "—" denotes an instrumental

== Personnel ==
- Peter Okoye – primary artist
- Paul Okoye – primary artist
- Aituaje Iruobe – featured artist
- Alaye – featured artist
- Peter Okoye - production
- Paul Okoye - production
- Martins Okechukwu Justice - production
- Jude Engees Okoye - supervising, video directing
- Zeeno Foster - mixing, mastering, recording
- George Nathaniel - recording engineer
- Heavy L Beatz - programming
- Kelechi Amadi-Obi - photography

== Release history ==
Region	Date	Version	Format	Label
Nigeria	1 May 2007	Standard	CD	Square Records
Worldwide	1 May 2007	Standard	Digital download	Square Records
Worldwide	19 August 2008	Reissue	Digital download	Square Records
