= Alingo =

Single by P-Square

from the album Greatest Hits and Double Trouble
- Released: August 16, 2012
- Recorded: 2012
- Genre: Afropop
- Length: 4:31
- Label: Square; Konvict
- Songwriter: P-Square
- Producer: Pappy J

P-Square singles chronology
"Beautiful Onyinye" (2012)	"Alingo" (2012)	"Personally" (2013)

Music video
- "Alingo" on YouTube

"Alingo" is a song by Nigerian duo P-Square. It appeared as a bonus track on their sixth studio album, Double Trouble (2014). The song peaked at number one on MTV Base's Official Naija Top 10 Chart for the week of March 22 through March 28, 2013, surpassing 2 Face Idibia's "Ihe Neme". The duo recorded "Alingo" prior to the Love AfroBeats Festival, which occurred at the Hammersmith Apollo in London.

== Music video ==
The music video for "Alingo" was directed by Jude Engees Okoye and Clarence Peters. It won Most Gifted African (West) Video and was nominated for Most Gifted Video of the Year at the 2013 Channel O Music Video Awards. Jude Engees Okoye won Best Music Video Director at The Headies 2013 for "Alingo".

== Dance move and controversy ==
"Alingo" became popular due to its controversial dance moves. The duo first announced the Alingo dance during a press conference for the Love Afrobeats Festival, and said the dance's pace makes it complicated for a lot of people. After uploading the music video for "Alingo" to YouTube, the duo received numerous criticism from people who felt the song's dance moves bear close resemblance to the Azonto dance. Puffy Tee, a music manager responsible for Olu Maintain's "Yahooze", VIP's "Away" and Becca's "No Away", extensively stated: "the music industry is a vast one so everybody has the opportunity to create a new thing, so if Ghanaians introduce Azonto and P-Square from Nigeria also create Alingo, it's all in the best interest of the African music industry as a whole".

The Nigerian Broadcasting Corporation placed a ban on the music video, citing "erotic dance scenes". In response to the ban, Peter Okoye said the ban helped promote the song and did not prevent cable networks from playing the record.

== Accolades ==
Year	Awards ceremony	Award description(s)	Results
2013	Channel O Music Video Awards	Most Gifted African (West) Video	Won
2013	Channel O Music Video Awards	Most Gifted Video of the Year	Nominated
2013	The Headies	Song of the Year	Nominated
2013	The Headies	Best Music Video	Won

== Track listing ==
Digital single

No.	Title	Writer(s)	Length
1.	"Alingo"	P-Square	4:31
2.	"Alingo (Instrumental)"	————	4:29

== Charts ==
=== Weekly charts ===
Chart (2013)	Peak position
UK Indie (OCC)	45
