= Saran Kaba Jones =

Liberian government official and social entrepreneur

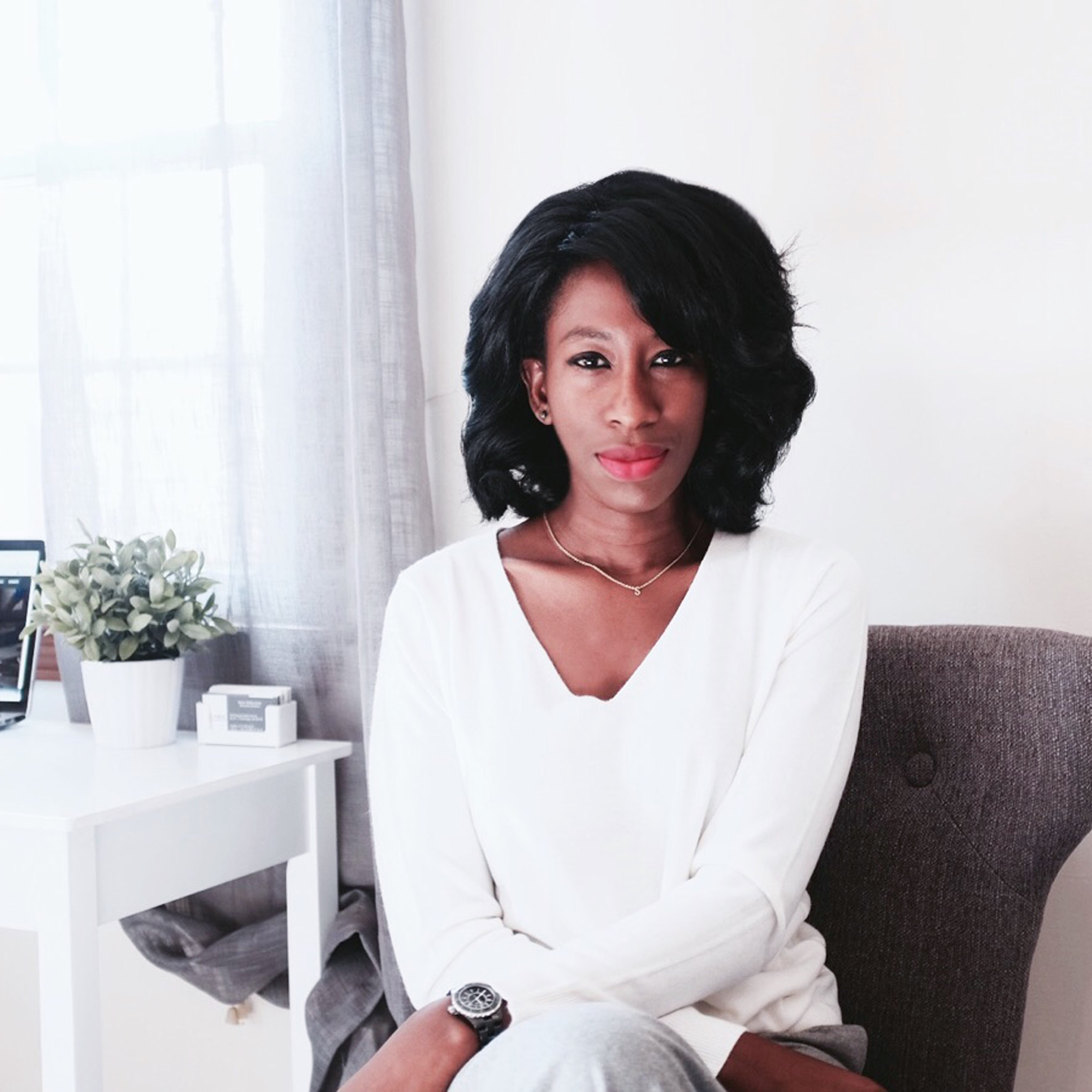
- Headshot of Jones
- Born: June 21, 1982 (age 43); Monrovia, Liberia
- Occupations: Government official, social entrepreneur
- Known for: Founder of FACE Africa
- Website: www.faceafrica.org

Saran Kaba Jones (born 21 June 1982) is a Liberian government official and social entrepreneur. She is the founder of FACE Africa, a nonprofit organization focused on water, sanitation and hygiene (WASH) infrastructure and services in rural communities in sub-Saharan Africa, with a particular focus on Liberia. In 2024, President Joseph Boakai nominated her as Special Assistant to the Minister of Foreign Affairs, and she is listed by the Ministry of Foreign Affairs as Assistant Minister/Chief of Staff in the Office of the Minister of Foreign Affairs. She was named one of Time's Next Generation Leaders in 2016.

== Background and education ==
Jones was born in Monrovia, Liberia. According to a 2016 Time profile, she left Liberia as a child and spent many years abroad before returning in 2008. She attended Lesley College before transferring to Harvard College, where she studied government and international relations.

== Career ==
Before founding FACE Africa, Jones worked at the Singapore Economic Development Board and at the W.E.B. Du Bois Institute at Harvard University.

Jones returned to Liberia in 2008. She has stated that she initially planned to start an educational scholarship fund, but shifted her focus after learning that lack of access to safe water was a more immediate problem for many rural communities. She subsequently founded FACE Africa, which works on community-based water, sanitation and hygiene projects in Liberia and elsewhere in sub-Saharan Africa.

During the West African Ebola outbreak in 2014, The Boston Globe reported that Jones and FACE Africa expanded their work to include shipping medical supplies and supporting public health awareness efforts.

In February 2024, President Boakai nominated Jones as Special Assistant to the Minister of Foreign Affairs. A contemporaneous report noted that the position carries the rank of assistant minister under Liberian law. She is listed by the Ministry of Foreign Affairs as Assistant Minister/Chief of Staff in the Office of the Minister of Foreign Affairs, and was included in a 2025 Executive Mansion delegation to TICAD-9 and Expo 2025 in Japan under that title.

Jones has led FACE Africa in implementing community-based water, sanitation, and hygiene (WASH) programs across rural Liberia, particularly in Montserrado County. The organization’s work has included the construction of household latrines, installation of hand pumps and solar-powered water systems, and the delivery of hygiene education and community training programs.

Across multiple project phases, FACE Africa has delivered sanitation facilities and clean water infrastructure to several communities, including the construction of dozens of household latrines and multiple water points in towns such as Getelleh, Kpakillah, and Bentol. These initiatives have also incorporated innovations such as rainwater harvesting systems and community-led maintenance structures to support long-term sustainability.

Reporting from project sites indicates that these interventions have contributed to improved access to safe drinking water, reductions in waterborne diseases, and decreased time spent collecting water, particularly for women and children. In addition to infrastructure development, FACE Africa has supported the formation of local sanitation committees and promoted behavior change around hygiene practices in participating communities.

== Awards and recognition ==
Jones was named a 2013 World Economic Forum Young Global Leader. In 2016, she was included in Time's Next Generation Leaders list.
