= Beautiful Onyinye =

Single by P-Square featuring Rick Ross
- Released: 12 June 2012
- Recorded: 2012
- Genre: R&B; hip-hop
- Length: 4:52
- Label: Square; Konvict
- Songwriters: Peter Okoye; Paul Okoye; William Roberts II
- Producer: P-Square

P-Square singles chronology
"Chop My Money" (2012)	"Beautiful Onyinye" (2012)	"Alingo" (2012)

Rick Ross singles chronology
"So Sophisticated" (2012)	"Beautiful Onyinye" (2012)	"Pop That" (2012)

Music video
- "Beautiful Onyinye" on YouTube

"Beautiful Onyinye" is a song by Nigerian duo P-Square, released on 12 June 2012. The song originally appeared on their fifth studio album, The Invasion (2011). The official remix, which was featured on their Greatest Hits compilation album, includes a verse rhymed by American rapper Rick Ross. P-Square recorded the song shortly after signing partnership deals with Konvict Muzik and Universal Music Group.

== Background and recording ==
"Beautiful Onyinye", the opening track to The Invasion, was originally released on 29 July 2011. P-Square told Okay Nigeria TV, a Nigerian YouTube Channel, how they made the song. They said they were in a studio with Akon when Rick Ross stopped by. The latter expressed his admiration for the song's feel while he was playing the original song. They were then advised by Akon to work with Rick Ross. Both of them concurred, telling Jude Engees Okoye, their manager. The agreement was signed following a conversation with Rick Ross' manager.

== Music video ==
The music video for "Beautiful Onyinye" was released on 12 June 2012. It was directed by Ben Marc and Jude Engees Okoye. Akon and May D made cameos in the video. An unauthorized copy of the video surfaced on the internet prior to its official release, and was later removed following copyright claims from iROKO Partners. P-Square told Okay Nigeria TV that the scenes with Rick Ross were filmed in Miami, while the remaining video was filmed in South Africa. The video was nominated for Best Afro Pop and Video of the Year at the 2012 Nigeria Music Video Awards (NMVA).

== Live performances ==
On August 26, 2012, P-Square performed "Beautiful Onyinye" at the Love AfroBeats Festival, a concert they headlined. The duo also performed the song to a sold out crowd at the Hammersmith Apollo.

== Accolades ==
Year	Awards ceremony	Award description(s)	Results	Ref
2012	Nigerian Music Video Awards (NMVA)	Best Afro Pop Video	Nominated	
2012	Nigerian Music Video Awards (NMVA)	Video of the Year	Nominated	

== Release history ==
Country	Date	Format	Label	Ref
Worldwide	June 12, 2012	Music video	Square Records	
Worldwide	November 21, 2012	Digital download	Square Records	
