= Chop My Money =

Single by P-Square featuring Akon and May D
- Released: 23 February 2012
- Recorded: 2011–12
- Genre: Afropop
- Length: 4:32
- Label: Square; Konvict
- Songwriter: P-Square
- Producer: Fliptyce

P-Square singles chronology
"Forever" / "Bunieya Enu" (2011)	"Chop My Money" (2012)	"Beautiful Onyinye" (2012)

Akon singles chronology
"I'm Day Dreaming" (2011)	"Chop My Money" (2012)	"Like Money" (2012)

May D singles chronology
"Ile Ijo" (2012)	"Chop My Money" (2012)	"One Night Stand" (2012)

Music video
- "Chop My Money" on YouTube

"Chop My Money" is a song by Nigerian duo P-Square, featuring Akon and May D. The song originally appeared on their fifth studio album, The Invasion (2011), and was recorded shortly after P-Square signed a partnership deal with Akon's Konvict Muzik. The music video for "Chop My Money" was directed by Jude Engees Okoye and Ben Marc.

== Background and recording ==
"Chop My Money" loosely translates to Spend My Money. In an interview with Tim Westwood in 2012, the duo were asked about their collaboration with Akon and how it came about. They said they've known Akon for several years and their collaboration with him was an easy transition.

== Live performances ==
On August 26, 2012, P-Square performed "Chop My Money" at the Love AfroBeats Festival, a concert they headlined. The duo also performed the song to a sold out crowd at the Hammersmith Apollo.

== Accolades ==
"Chop My Money" was nominated for Best Pop Single, Best Collabo and Song of the Year at The Headies 2012. The song was also nominated for Hottest Single of the Year at the 2012 Nigeria Entertainment Awards.

Year	Awards ceremony	Award description(s)	Results
2012	The Headies	Best Pop Single	Nominated
2012	The Headies	Best Collabo	Nominated
2012	The Headies	Song of the Year	Nominated

== Track listing and covers ==
- Digital download
1. "Chop My Money" (P-Square, Akon and May D) – 4:32
2. "Chop My Money" (cover by Henhouse Prowlers, a Chicago bluegrass band)

== Charts ==
=== Weekly charts ===
Chart (2012)	Peak position
UK Indie (Official Charts)	50
