= Ayo Animashaun =

Nigerian entertainment executive

- Born: 17 March 1970 (age 56); Lagos State, Nigeria
- Occupations: entertainment entrepreneur, television executive.
- Spouse: Bisola Animashaun

Ayo Animashaun is a Nigerian entertainment entrepreneur and television executive. He owns HipTV.

== Early life ==
Animashaun was born in Lagos, Nigeria. He studied Business Administration at Kwara State Polytechnic.

== Career ==
He is CEO of Smooth Promotions, an entertainment firm that organises The Headies award and publishes the weekly Hip Hop World Magazine.

On 5 November 2013, he led his firm to launch HipTV on Multichoice DSTV.

In October 2013, The Net magazine listed him as one of the most influential people in the Nigerian entertainment industry.
