= HipTV =

- HipTV logo
- Country: Nigeria
- Broadcast area: West Africa
- Headquarters: 4, Ogundana Street Off Allen Avenue, Ikeja Lagos, Nigeria

Programming
- Language: English

Ownership
- Owner: Ayo Animashaun

History
- Launched: July 2007

Availability

Terrestrial
- Available on most TV stations: Check local listings for schedule

HipTV is a Nigerian basic cable television channel owned by Ayo Animashaun. The channel is the sole channel with broadcasting rights to The Headies. Headquartered in Ikeja, Lagos State, HipTV's features are centred primarily on entertainment ranging from latest music videos, entertainment news and lifestyle.

== History ==
HipTV was launched in July 2007 by Ayo Animashaun as a broadcast platform for Hip Hop World Magazine but has since risen to become a music and entertainment channel.

On 5 November 2013, HipTV was launched on Multichoice's DSTV as a 24-hour channel with a target audience from over 40 countries in Africa.
