= Henhouse Prowlers =

American bluegrass group

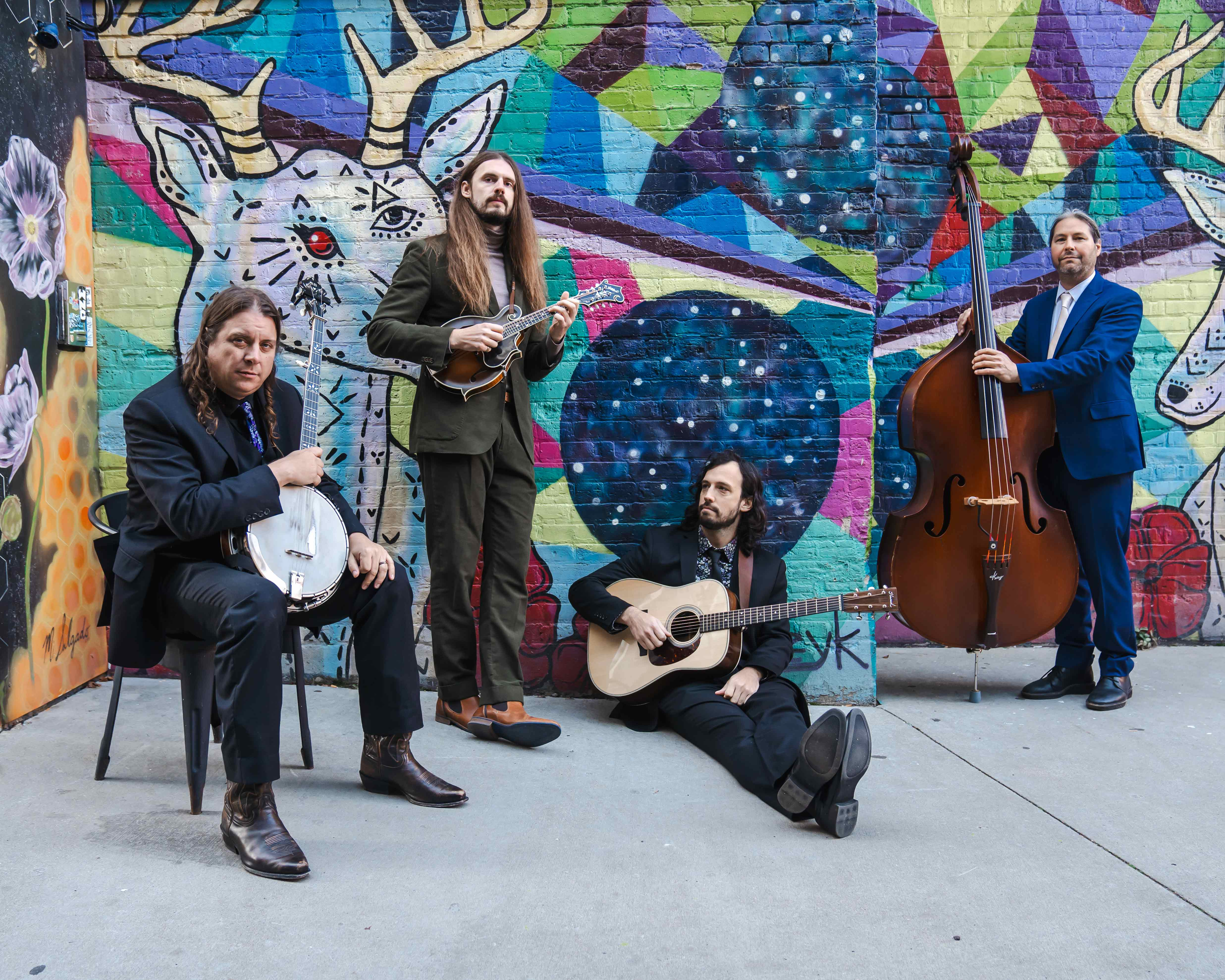
- Henhouse Prowlers in 2024. From left to right: Ben Wright, Jake Howard, Chris Dollar, and Jon Goldfine.

Background information
- Origin: Rogers Park, Chicago, Illinois, U.S.
- Genres: Bluegrass; Americana; folk
- Years active: 2004–present
- Members: Ben Wright; Jake Howard; Chris Dollar; Jon Goldfine

The Henhouse Prowlers are an American four-piece bluegrass, Americana, and folk music band based in Chicago, Illinois. Formed in 2004 in the Rogers Park neighborhood, the band has released 10 studio albums to date, with the most recent, Unravel, having dropped in April 2025. Throughout its history, the members have contributed original compositions featuring 3 and 4-part harmonies alongside instrumentation that includes guitar flatpicking and Scruggs style banjo. Their music often nods to traditional bluegrass, with their latest work bordering on progressive bluegrass/Americana.

Henhouse Prowlers have worked with the U.S. State Department as cultural ambassadors of the United States since 2013 via the American Music Abroad and Arts Envoy programs. To date, they have toured in 29 countries on 5 continents, including several countries in Africa, the Middle East, and Europe, plus Russia, Bolivia, and many more. This diplomacy work has inspired the formation of their own nonprofit organization, Bluegrass Ambassadors.

== Bluegrass Ambassadors ==
Among other pursuits, the 501(c)3 organization founded by the band aims to "educate and inspire through the cultural exchange of music." The band offers educational workshops informed by their travels and experiences as career musicians to youth and adults in a variety of settings and formats.

In 2024, Bluegrass Ambassadors and Henhouse Prowlers hosted a symposium and concert in Prague, Czechia to bring awareness to the link between American bluegrass and country music and the people of former Czechoslovakia, a history dating back to post-WWII. The program, called Common Chords, included educational outreach in schools in the country. Their forthcoming documentary will tell the story through a series of interviews with people who lived through this era.

== Members ==
- Ben Wright – banjo, vocals
- Jake Howard – mandolin, vocals
- Chris Dollar – guitar, vocals
- Jon Goldfine – double bass, vocals

== Discography ==
=== Studio albums ===
- Henhouse Prowlers, 2006
- A Dark Rumor, 2009
- Verses Chapters & Rhymes, 2011
- Breaking Ground, 2013
- Still On That Ride, 2015
- Separation Man, 2017
- The Departure, 2021
- Bluegrass Ambassadors Sessions: Vol. 1, 2022
- Lead and Iron, 2023
- Unravel, 2025

=== Live albums ===
- Direct from Chicago (Live), 2012
- Live From Kyrgyzstan, 2017
