= P-Square =

Nigerian R&B and hip hop duo

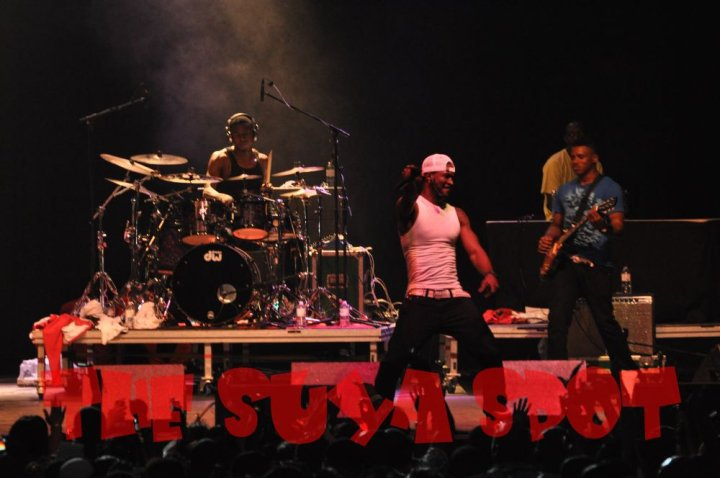
- P-Square on stage performing in Canada in 2010
- Born: Peter Okoye; Paul Okoye; 18 November 1981 (age 45); Jos, Plateau, Nigeria
- Other names: Peter & Paul
- Citizenship: Nigerian, American
- Occupations: Singers; songwriters; dancers; record producers
- Years active: 1997–2017; 2021–2023
- Notable work: Discography
- Awards: Full list
- Musical career
- Origin: Ifite Dunu, Anambra, Nigeria
- Genres: Afropop; R&B; hip hop; dance-pop
- Instruments: Vocals; DAW
- Labels: Square Records; Konvict Muzik; Universal Music SA; Square Root Entertainment

P-Square were a Nigerian music duo composed of twin brothers Peter Okoye and Paul Okoye, born 18 November 1981, who co-write and co-produce most of their songs. Noted for their artistic reinvention, musical versatility, and visual presentation, they are widely regarded as one of the most influential African acts of all time and one of the most successful music groups from the continent. They were integral to the evolution of 2000s and 2010s African popular music. The duo was launched into the mainstream recognition following the release of the song "Senorita" in 2003, and later gained recognition after releasing their sophomore album Get Squared in 2005. The success of the album earned them a nomination at the MTV Europe Music Awards for Best African Act in 2006. In 2015, P-Square was awarded Artistes of the Decade at the MTV Africa Music Awards 2015.

After the disbandment of the dancing and singing group they formed in the late 1990s, Peter and Paul subsequently founded P-Square. In 2001, they won a talent show and signed a record deal with Timbuk2 Label where they released their debut album in 2003. They later founded their own label, Square Records, and released the following albums: Get Squared (2005), Gameover (2007), Danger (2009), Invasion (2011) and Double Trouble (2014). The Gameover album, which explored multiple societal themes such as love, regret, assurance and political criticism, reportedly sold over 8 million copies worldwide. It is the only 2000s project from Nigeria to have surpassed 30 million streams on Spotify, and has been considered a timeless body of work by music critics. Some of P-Square's songs include "Personally," "Chop My Money," "Beautiful Onyinye," "Alingo," "E No Easy" "Shekini," "Do Me," "Temptation," "Bring it On," "Testimony," "Bizzy Body," and "Gimme Dat."

In 2011, they signed a record deal with Akon's Konvict Muzik. The duo has been nominated for BET Awards, Soul Train Awards, MTV Europe Music Awards, MOBO Awards, and have won KORA Awards, MTV Africa Music Awards, and Channel O Music Video Awards. They were also the first Nigerian acts to peak at top 5 on SNEP, France's official music chart, and top 10 on Ultratop, Belgium's official chart in 2012, with the French version of "E No Easy" featuring Matt Houston. The song was the first Afrobeats summer hit in France.

They have been referred to as the "Best African Group" by Forbes Africa consecutively. They have appeared on the Forbes lists of the 40 most powerful celebrities in Africa. In 2021, the duo reunited after their disbandment in 2017. They returned with the singles "Jaiye (Ihe Geme)" and "Find Somebody" and announced their 100 city reunion tour and their forthcoming album.

== History ==
=== 1981–1999: Childhood and career beginnings ===
The twins Peter Okoye and Paul Okoye, originally from Anambra State, were born on 18 November 1981 in Jos, to Josephine Okoye, a pastor, and Pa Moses Okoye, a businessman. Peter and Paul, together with their siblings: Jude, Mary, Tony, Lilian and Ifeanyi Okoye, were raised Catholics, with Christian values.

They became interested in performing arts while attending St. Murumba College, a Catholic school in Jos. They were involved in the school music and drama club and began singing and dancing, while drawing inspiration from artists like Bobby Brown, Michael Jackson, and MC Hammer. Also while in school, they formed an a cappella quartet that eventually morphed into a more pop-oriented dance crew in which they developed choreographed routines. Their artistic talent and precise dance routine soon made them household names in the city of Jos, where they performed at school functions and other occasions.

Inspired by the success of Nigeria's team at the 1996 Summer Olympic in Atlanta, they dabbled in an unsuccessful footballing career at Pepsi Football academy, in Jos. They played alongside Mikel John Obi at the academy, who was in the junior team then. They would later form a music and dancing group called Smooth Criminal in 1997. By 1999, they had added keyboards, bass, drum, and guitar to their skills. Their works include the soundtracks for a number of films like Tobi, Mama Sunday, Moment of Bitterness and Evas River. Despite their parents' hope for them to aim for a career in academics, Peter and Paul remained committed to their music.

They later went to do their diploma programs at the University of Jos. After which they proceeded to University of Abuja for their degree program in 1999 to study business administration.

=== 2000–2004: Breakthrough with Last Nite ===
The Smooth Criminals group disbanded when its members left to various other universities. Subsequently, Peter and Paul formed their own group, variously called "Double P", "P&P", and "Da Pees", until they eventually settled on "P-Square", a name given to them by a friend of theirs called Richard. They later signed a management deal with Bayo Odusami, a seasoned concert promoter. Around the same time, P-Square won a Nigerian talent competition "Grab Da Mic" in 2001, and hence Benson & Hedges sponsored their debut album. Peter stated, "I think it was one hell of an opportunity for us then. We were still in our first year at the University of Abuja in 2001 when we were informed about the competition in Jos. We were already popular in Abuja and bought the form. We came tops out of 38 artistes that participated. We took the first position and eventually represented the Northern Zone in the Abuja final where we won again out of the 22 artistes that took part in that show. At the finals in Lagos, we became the overall winners which made Benson and Hedges offer to launch our album." Their debut studio album Last Nite was released under Timbuk2 Music Label in 2003. Though with a modest success, the album, garnered the duo a nomination for The Most Promising African Group at the KORA Awards 2003 and won the 2003 Amen Award for Best R&B Group.

=== 2005–2006: Mainstream success with Get Squared ===
In May 2005, the duo returned with their sophomore album, Get Squared, released on their own record label Square Records. A breakthrough success, the album spawned several hit singles, which includes, "Bizzy Body," "Temptation," "Omoge Mi," and "Say Your Love." Get Squared was the start of real commercial success for the twins and it became one of the highest-selling albums of 2005. The album's opener, "Story", tells the tale of their life career up till that point, and shows gratitude to God and their fans. It reenacts the traditional African storytelling setting where children gather around an elder and listened intently. "Oga Police", spoke about police brutality from the viewpoint of a young Nigerian. "Temptation" centers on the theme of a flirtatious man. The success of Get Squared earned them a nomination at the 2006 MTV EMA awards for Best African Act. P-Square won 5 awards in one night at the maiden edition of the Headies Awards (then known as the Hip Hop World Awards) in 2006, in the following categories: Best R&B/Pop Album, Album of the Year, Best Music Video, Song of the Year, Artiste of the Year.

=== 2007–2008: Continent-wide success with Gameover ===
In May 2007, P-Square released their third studio album, Gameover. In the album, P-Square embraced a stylistic shifts and a new musical direction that was very remarkable, due to the album's usage of Nigerian rhythms and melodies. It received the most critical commercial reception in comparison to their debut and sophomore albums. The album sold over 8 million copies worldwide. Gameover boasts of several hits like "No One Like You," "Roll It," "Ifunanya," and the lead single "Do Me", which featured vocals from Afro-soul singer Waje. "Do Me" became a massive pop anthem few days after release that clubs, music shows, parties and other fun places won't be lit without it. In the publication of Red Bull editor, Jessica Kariisa, she wrote, "The album's bright and bouncy single 'No One Like You' would go on to service many a wedding reception dancefloor across the continent and diaspora, but it was the sleek bop 'Do Me' that solidified the twins as Afropop stars." Riding a wave of their widespread reception, the duo released an accompanying Game Over video album in 2008, the first of its kind in the industry. The success of the album won them the Best Group at the MTV Africa Music Awards 2008, and were nominated for Artiste of the Year, Best Video, Best Live Performer, and Best R&B. They also won the Best Group award at the 2007 Channel O Music Video award and received the Best Video award for "Do Me". They were also nominated at MOBO Awards for Best African Act in 2008.

=== 2009–2010: Evolution with Danger album ===
In the 2009 CNN documentary on Nigerian music, Christian Purefoy revealed how P-Square had sold multiple arenas across Africa in the late 2000s. He said "...Having conquered Africa, P-Square are now planning a tour in America and Europe. Building on their success in Africa, the Nigerian Artistes are hoping the stage is set to take on the rest of the world."

In September 2009, P-Square released their fourth studio album Danger. It was supported by hits like "E No Easy," featuring J. Martins, "Gimme Dat," "Danger", which interpolated Eminem's "Without Me" and "Possibility" featuring 2Face. In an interview with Busola Afolabi, P-Square talked about the album, they said "For the first time, P-Square did an experiment which is bringing a kind of song that doesn't exist in Africa and we were happy when we heard it was number two in the African top 10 countdown. Also for the first time, we did a collabo with 2Face. Africans demanded for it, so we decided to give it to them. We are now matured, it is not like the "Do me I do you" song, this is more of facing the real life. We tried to portray the African side of women and their pride. So it is the maturity in it that stands it out." The album earned the duo international accolades, including being the first Nigerian artiste to be nominated at the BET Awards in 2010 for Best International Act. They also won the 2010 KORA award for Artiste of the Year, becoming the second Nigerian artiste to win the category since Femi Kuti in 1999. P-Square missed the event due to their tour in London. However, the KORA award plaque and its cash reward of $1M were received by Blaise Compaoré, the President of Burkina Faso at the event; he would later present the award to P-Square at his presidential villa.

In 2010, P-Square embarked on their first American tour. While on the tour they had an international media tour with an American talk show host Wendy Williams. They were asked who they would like to collaborate in America, Peter stated, "...we would love to work with Michael Jackson, we wish he was still alive". They also cited Bobby Brown and MC Hammer as musical inspirations.

=== 2011–2012: The Invasion and international success ===
On 29 July 2011, P-Square released their fifth studio album "The Invasion". The album's theme which focuses on love, wealth, success, and nightlife, is composed of R&B, reggae, hip hop, Europop and contemporary highlife sounds. The album featured guest appearances from Tiwa Savage, Naeto C, Waje, May D, Eva Alordiah, and Muna.

To celebrate the launch of their new album, P-Square hosted the Invasion concert, in collaboration with Flytime Entertainment. The show which held in Lagos was graced by some notable Nigerian personalities. The red carpet at the event included of Lagos State First Lady Abimbola Fashola, Jay Jay Okocha, Kate Henshaw, 9ice, Sound Sultan, Tiwa Savage, Omotola Jalade Ekeinde, Ikechukwu, Segun Bucknor, Stephanie Coker, AY, Nse Ikpe Etim, Uti Nwachukwu, DJ Jimmy Jatt, Seyi Shay, J. Martins, Waje, Daddy Freeze, Darey, Toolz, Weird MC, Ebuka Obi-Uchendu, Davido, Muna and Bovi.

In August 2011, P-Square headlined the Afrobeats Festival at the Apollo Hammersmith in London. The event was organized by Cokobar, Phoenix Media and Smade in association with Choice FM. According to Bella Naija, "It was the first African event in the UK to sellout a 5,000+ capacity venue with over 3,000 people attempting to get last minute tickets at the venue." PM Entertainment gathered that P-Square was used to headline the concert by the organisers due to popular demand for the twin brothers in the UK. In December 2011, they signed a record deal with Akon's Konvict Muzik label. The affiliation with the label, coupled with their subsequent distribution deal in 2012 with Universal Music SA added to the international success of the Invasion album. The songs "Chop My Money" and "Beautiful Onyinye" later gained international attention in 2012 following the remixes with Akon and Rick Ross respectively. Henhouse Prowlers, American bluegrass band, covered "Chop My Money" in their album. In the same year, P-Square was featured in Forbes' list of The 40 Most Powerful Celebrities In Africa, among those who have exerted the highest degree of influence in contemporary African pop culture.

In April 2012, they collaborated with French singer Matt Houston in the French version of their 2009 hit song "E No Easy", retitled "Positif." The song spent 29 weeks at No. 5 on SNEP, France's official chart and 16 weeks at No. 7 on Ultratop, Belgium's official chart respectively. The song was the first Afrobeats summer hit in France in 2012. The success of the song boosted P-Square's visibility in the Francophone countries. The English version was played in Paris during a celebration by the 2012 French Olympic team.

In August 2012, P-Square dropped the single "Alingo". It was produced by Pappy J and its music video was directed by Jude Okoye and Clarence Peters. It won the Channel O Music Video award and The Headies award for Best Music Video of the year in 2013.

=== 2013–2014: Double Trouble groundbreaking ===
In 2013, P-Square paid homage to Michael Jackson in the "Personally" music video. The song was produced by Vtek. The video featured cameo appearance from Nollywood veteran Osita Iheme. Three days after the music video dropped, they got a call from the Jackson family, who sent them an appreciation video through Jermaine Jackson. In his speech of compliments, he said, "It's not everyday that a phenomenal band comes along...P-Square, they are absolutely sensational, with their singing and dancing it kind of remind me of being in the Jackson 5..."

"Personally" earned P-Square a nomination for Best International Performance at the 2013 Soul Train Music Awards, becoming the first Nigerian Artiste to be nominated at the Soul Train Awards.

In March 2013, P-Square collaborated with Nigerian veteran musician Lagbaja in a song titled "Unlimited", to create the theme song for one of Nigerian telecommunications company Glo. In February 2014, P-Square prepared to launch a family-oriented animated series titled The Alingo's; the name was inspired by their song "Alingo". In description of the series, Vanguard News wrote, "It is a project from P-Classic Entertainment, a company aimed at producing television contents and animation. It is creatively driven by Peter Okoye. The show aims to be the first high quality animated series from Nigeria." The series was ultimately canceled.

On 7 September 2014, P-Square unveiled the release date for their sixth studio album Double Trouble. The album which was released on 12 September 2014, already had 3 released singles: "Ejeajo" featuring T.I., "Shekini", and "Bring It On" featuring Dave Scott. "Testimony", "Personally", and "Alingo" were included as bonus tracks. Double Trouble featured additional guest appearances from Don Jazzy, Awilo Longomba, and Jermaine Jackson, alongside T.I. and Dave Scott. "Bring It On" portrayed how one should not give up, even in difficult times. "Shekini" which dominated the airwaves in Middle East and North Africa, had some of Arab acts like Black Cats and Arash sampling the song. "Shekini" provided the catalyst that helped the duo to break into the Arab world market.

In September 2014, they kicked off their Double Trouble world tour.

=== 2015–2016: Mawazine Festival and Artiste of the decade ===
Omar Es Saidi, a Moroccan radio personality, who spoke exclusively to Saturday Tribune during the All African Music Awards acknowledged P-Square. He said, "Moroccans, four-five years ago, did not know about Nigerian music. But we decided to introduce Nigerian music with P-Square, D'banj and others. I don't know how else to tell you, but Nigerian music is a big success in Morocco. P-Square is a big star in Morocco. Festival Mawazine is one of the biggest festivals in Morocco. P-Square was booked to perform at the festival in 2015. It was a huge success."

In March 2015, it was announced that P-Square would co-headline the annual Mawazine International Music Festival in Morocco, Alongside Jennifer Lopez, Pharrell Williams, Akon, Usher, Maroon 5, and Placebo. This would make P-Square the first Afrobeats artistes to perform to over 100,000 spectators at the event since it was founded in 2001. In July 2015, P-Square was awarded the honorary "Artistes of the Decade" at the 2015 MTV Africa Music Awards, for their cultural impacts in the music industry.

In August 2015, GLO partnered with Peter of P-Square on a TV competition dance show called Dance With Peter, which was broadcast on Africa Magic Urban, AIT, TV3, ORTB & MTV-Base Africa. It was intended to bring dancers and entertainers from around the world to showcase their talents for prizes. Kelvin Ayanruoh emerged the winner taking home the following rewards: Toyota RAV 4 SUV, N3million cash, and an opportunity of featuring in P-Square's next music video.

In the same year, P-Square announced their 2015 summer tour in USA/Canada, during the tour they met with the ROC Nations boss, Jay-Z and his cousin Bee-High in their Tidal's New York Office for a business deal.

In March 2016, P-Square co-headlined the main stage at the Pal Mundo World Festival in the Netherlands, alongside American merengue singer Elvis Crespo. In the same year, there was rumors of P-Square going their separate ways. However, Peter's personal manager refuted the rumors that the twin brothers are still together, he said, "Peter is still very much with his brother, Changing his name to Mr.P has nothing to do with breaking up with his twin brother or going solo." The Duo's Publicist, Bayo Adetu, also maintained that there is no official statement regarding the viral rumors from the public.

In September 2016, P-Square released their comeback single "Bank Alert". The music video for "Bank Alert" was directed by Clarence Peters and features cameo appearances from veteran musician Onyeka Onwenu and Nollywood actor Mr. Ibu.

=== 2017: The split ===
In February 2017, P-Square released the sensational song titled ‘Away,’ with its accompanying music video.

In September 2017, they cancelled their ‘USA/Canada tour 2017’ amidst of rumors of another rift between them.

In the same period, Peter of P-Square indicated his intention to cancel his contract with the ‘P-Square Brand’ He stated in his letter to their lawyer, "What I am about to do has been a very difficult decision to make. I have decided to use this medium to terminate the agreement between Psquare."

=== 2018–2021: Solo careers ===
The group later disbanded to pursue solo music careers behind their pseudonyms RudeBoy (Paul) and Mr. P.(Peter). The duo, undeniably, had bankable solo careers.

Mr. P (Peter) had successful singles like ‘Ebeano,’ "Look into my eyes," "Just Like that," and "One more night." He also dabbled in acting in the 2018 drama, Genevieve Nnaji's "Lionheart," and more recently in the Netflix original "Shanty Town."

Rudeboy (Paul) also had a musical solo career. He had singles like "Reason With Me," "Woman," "Together," "Ayoyo," "Double Double," and "Audio Money."

In 2021, they released their solo debut album titled "Prodigal," by Mr. P and "RudyKillUs," by Rudeboy.

In November 2021, the duo put an end to their years-long falling-out. In a viral video, their elder brother and manager Jude, could be seen warmly celebrating his twin brothers.

=== 2022–present: Reunion Tour and Fourthcoming album ===
In May 2022, the duo announced their reunion world tour, which is scheduled to kick off on 5 August 2022 and come to an end on 10 December 2022. They toured several cities in North America, Europe, Africa and Asia (Dubai).

In September 2022, P-Square made a fiery debut at the Royal Albert Hall, London, with Dbanj, Awilo Longomba, Alaye, Weird MC as guest artistes.

In May 2023, P-Square disclosed to the CNN Reporter Larry Madowo, in an interview of their forthcoming album.

== Artistry ==
“It's not everyday that a phenomenal band comes along…P-Square, they are absolutely sensational, with their singing and dancing it kind of remind me of being in the Jackson 5…”

— Jermaine Jackson (2013)

=== Vocal style ===
P-Square possesses a Tenor and Contra-alto voice type, with a range spanning from G#2 - D5.

"Beautiful Onyinye," "No one like you," "I Love you," "Forever," "Omoge Mi," and "Bring it on", notably demonstrate their vocal dexterity.

=== Influences ===
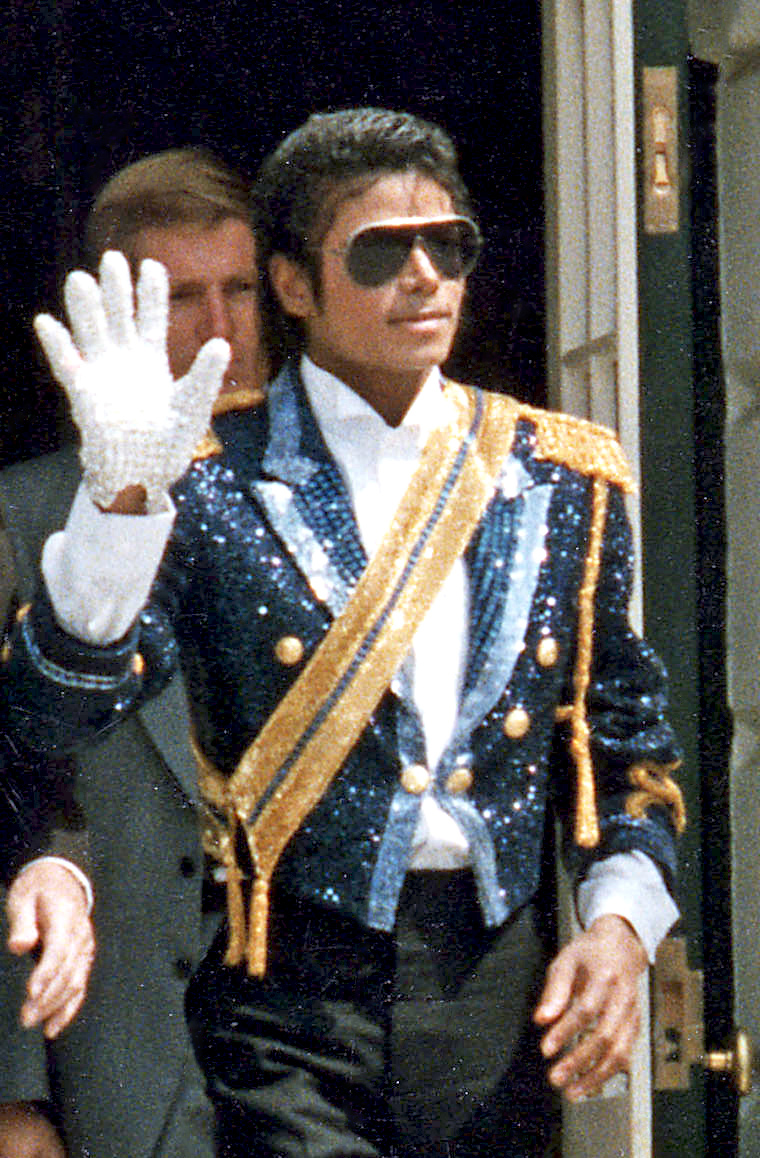
Michael Jackson in 1984. He is cited as P-Square's major musical inspiration.

P-Square has cited Bobby Brown, Michael Jackson, and MC Hammer as musical inspirations. Peter stated, "...We were like a group; Paul, my elder brother Tony and I, we found ourselves miming the songs of MC Hammer, Bobby Brown and others but the main singer to push us a lot was Michael Jackson."

=== Musical style ===
P-Square's music is a fusion of R&B, Hip Hop, Afropop & Dance Pop. Their musical style is generally characterized by big budget videos, love focused lyrics, relaxed rhythms, evocative and dance-floor ready music. In an interview with Wendy Williams, Paul stated, " P-Square's most dance and club songs come from Peter, and I am into mid tempo and love songs. While the concept for our Video directions comes from Jude."

=== Stage and videos ===
P-Square's Stage Performances have received praise from fans and critics for their stage presence; singing, dancing, and playing multiple musical instruments during performances.

P-Square has received accolades for their 'big-budget' and 'game-changing' videos such as "Temptation remix (2006)" and "Do Me (2008)". Statedly, 'they always maintained that shooting quality videos have been an advantage to their career transformation.'

== Endorsement ==
In August 2010, P-Square signed a multi-million naira endorsement deal with Glo as the Ambassadors for the telecom company.

P-Square would later collaborate with the Nigerian Veteran Musician, Lagbaja in 2013 to create a theme song titled 'Unlimited' for the Telecommunication giant.

== Legacy ==
The duo, having debuted in 2003, has made a profound impact on African Popular culture and beyond, with their Music, Visuals, Performances, and tours. Forbes included P-Square on its 40 Most Powerful Celebrities in Africa in 2011, acknowledging their commercial dominance. P-Square was awarded the honorary "Artiste of the Decade" at the MTV Africa Music Award 2015, for their cultural impacts in the music industry between 2005 and 2015.New African magazine included P-Square on its 2013 rankings of 100 most influential African, they added, "P-Square have defined and set a benchmark for a new generation of Nigerian and African artists to follow with their energetic and infectious sound…Hit after hit, the twin brothers have become apt at giving audiences songs that cut across age, gender and geographical boundaries" Keisha Gitari on BBC, noted, "As a duo they dominated the Nigerian music scene for years in and were one of the first groups to export Afrobeats to other parts of the continent."P-Square was honored as KORA LEGEND on 17 November 2023. They noted, "From their captivating debut to their energetic stage performances, P-Square has captured the hearts of millions of fans worldwide. Their catchy melodies, unrivalled creativity and dedication to the art of music have elevated them to the status of true industry legends."

=== Commercial influence ===
Referred to as the "Best African Group" by Forbes Africa and various media outlets, P-Square has sold over 40 million albums records as of 2011. They remained one of the best selling African acts of all time in the CD era. CNN reporter, Christian Purefoy, in his 2009 documentary on Nigeria Music, revealed how P-Square sold millions of album copies in a week. From the "Get squared" Album, Psquare would go on to have a trifecta projects with "Gameover" and "Danger." Their commercial power is evenly distributed across CD albums sales and digital streaming sales.

=== Visual album ===
P-Square's Visual Albums in mid 2000s are cited as 'cementing' the status of albums and music videos as an ‘Art.’ With the video albums of "Get Squared" and " Game Over", they have been referred to as the primary innovators of Nigeria's modern music videos. Their music videos were regularly featured on MTV Base, a music channel that catered to audiences across Africa and Europe.

=== Musical diversity ===
P-Square has ventured into diverse genres like R&B, Pop, EDM, Reggaeton, Dance pop, Reggae, Disco, Rock, Gospel pop, Bongo Flava and Soukous.

=== North America ===
P-Square was cited among the acts that made the Afrobeats genre popular on the international stage, through their series of tours and features with Foreign Acts like Rick Ross, T.I, Akon. They had attracted Busta Rhymes to Nigeria at an event in 2008, to promote peace in the Niger delta part of Nigeria. P-Square has also attracted the Jackson's Family to Nigeria in 2013.

=== Middle East and North Africa ===
"Shekini" off the "Double Trouble" Album provided the catalyst that boosted Afrobeats Visibility in Middle East and North Africa. The song played a role in the recordings of some biggest Arab Acts like Arash and Black Cats.

In 2015, P-Square was invited to perform at the international music festival in Morocco, alongside Jennifer Lopez, Pharrell Williams, Sean Paul, Avicii, Akon, Usher and Maroon 5. They became the first afrobeats artistes that have had that kind of success in the Arab world.

=== Europe ===
When Afrobeats was never mainstream in Europe, P-Square headlined the first afrobeats concert tagged 'Afrobeats Festival' in London at Apollo Theatre. According to BellaNaija, it was the first African Event in the UK to attract close to 8000 people.

In 2012, they became the first Afrobeats artistes to peak at top 5 on SNEP - French official chart and top 10 on Ultratop - Belgium Official chart. The song was the first Afrobeats summer hit song in France and in turn boosted Afrobeats visibility in the francophone music market.

P-Square co-headlined the main stage at the Pal Mundo world festival in 2016 - the biggest Caribbean and Latin Music Festival in Netherlands, alongside the "Suavemente" crooner, Elvis Crespo.

=== Films ===
P-Square songs have been featured in a lot Hollywood movies in the form soundtrack and dramatic scenes.

In 2016, ‘Shekini’ was among the soundtrack for the American Biological drama feature film - The Queen of Katwe.

=== Diplomacy ===
P-Square has been part of important events and celebrations in Africa notably: Rwanda's Patriotic Front Silver Jubilee, Liberia's Bicentennial Celebration events, South Sudan's "Together for Peace Concert."

=== Politics ===
P-Square have used their position to play important political roles in Nigeria. They endorsed the Labour Party Candidate Peter Obi in 2023 Nigeria Presidential election, though some have cited their patriotism to be performative, because they rapport with capitalists and have had other presidential guests. They performed at the inauguration of President Buhari in 2015.

=== Influence on other artistes ===
Some Artists have cited P-Square as their major musical inspiration, notably Davido, Wizkid, Rema, among others.

=== Tributes ===
Darey's song "Pray For Me" featuring the Soweto Gospel Choir, was inspired by the story of P-Square; how their move from the city of Jos to Lagos caused disapproval from their parents.How Psquare’s Split Inspired Darey’s ‘Pray For Me’

== Controversy ==
P-Square attracted headlines because they reportedly turned irate when they were notified by organisers in the middle of their performance at the Guinness Show about some change in plans which would affect the length of their performance, and that of the next act, Sean Paul. DJ Jimmy Jatt explained that - "According to the production plan, the live broadcast was planned to have Sean Paul perform at the same time of P-Square's performance. They needed to show the reggae star to the waiting viewers across the globe so as to balance the simultaneous transmission of the concert across specified countries" They were said to have immediately left the premises of the show, but after intervention of the show organisers, they returned with 2face to perform "possibility", but later on received apology.

Even though the history and evolution of Nigerian Hip hop has its influence from the fusion of American hip hop and Afrobeat, the P-Square group has been faced with controversies for their slight sampling of western songs in their records. In an interview with the host of the 'truth show' Olisa Adibua, they maintained that as a record producer and songwriter, one can build on any record using an existing or non-existing artistic techniques.

The duo had a difference in opinion regarding what Peter perceived as a lopsidedness in individual input of songs which was getting featured on their joint albums with Paul getting a lion share of his songs selected. This led to Peter refusing to do anything associated with the name "P-Square" for weeks. He later relocated with his wife and kids from the mansion they shared. A lawyer was involved to help split their fortune as they were both involved in joint ventures over the prior years.

The brothers ultimately reconciled publicly on 17 November 2021, when they both hugged and shook hands at Peter Okoye's home in Lagos. Peter's wife and the duo's older brother, Jude Okoye were also present and hugged each other as well.

== Personal lives ==
After dating for seven years, Peter Okoye got engaged to his longtime girlfriend, Titilola Loretta Omotayo. Omotayo is a marketing representative. The couple are parents to son Cameron and daughter Aliona. On 17 November 2013, the two held their traditional wedding at The Ark in Lekki, Lagos, Nigeria. Public figures who attended the wedding include Aliko Dangote, Emmanuel Adebayor, Kate Henshaw, Genevieve Nnaji, Rukky Sanda, Folorunsho Alakija, May D, Toke Makinwa, Dr SID, Don Jazzy, and Karen Igho among others.

Paul Okoye met Anita Isama in 2004 while attending the University of Abuja. Their son Andre was born 11 April 2013 in Atlanta, Georgia, United States. The couple married on Saturday, 22 March 2014 at the Aztech Arcum Events Centre in Port Harcourt. In October 2022, an Abuja High Court dissolved Okoye’s marriage to Anita Isama after eight years and granted the former couple joint custody of their children.

In January 2014, the Okoye brothers bought mansions next door to one another in Atlanta.

On 27 June 2020, Peter Okoye opened up in a video on his Instagram page how he and his wife contracted COVID-19. He then urged people to adhere to safety precautions highlighted by the Nigeria Centre for Disease Control, NCDC, to be safe from the COVID-19 pandemic.

== Discography ==
=== Studio albums ===
- Last Nite (2003)
- Get Squared (2005)
- Game Over (2007)
- Danger (2009)
- The Invasion (2011)
- Double Trouble (2014)

=== Compilation albums ===
- Greatest Hits (2013)

=== International singles ===
| Title | Year | Album |
|---|---|---|
| "E No Easy" (P-Square featuring J. Martins) | 2009 | Danger |
| "Positif" (Matt Houston feat. P-Square) | 2012 | Racines |
| "Chop My Money" (P-Square featuring Akon & May D) | 2012 | The Invasion |
| "Beautiful Onyinye" (P-Square featuring Rick Ross) | 2012 | The Invasion |
| "Personally" (P-Square) | 2013 | Double Trouble |
| "Ejeajo" (P-Square featuring T.I) | 2014 | Double Trouble |
| "Bring It On" (P-Square featuring Dave Scott) | 2014 | Double Trouble |
| "Getting Down" (Mokobé featuring P-Square) | 2015 | |

== Filmography ==
=== Video albums ===
| Title | Album details | Certifications |
|---|---|---|
| P-Square Da Videos | Released: 2005; Label: Square Records; Formats: CD, Digital Download | - |
| P-Square Tempted2Watch | Released: 2006; Label: Square Records; Formats: CD, Digital Download | - |
| P-Square Take Over Video CD | Released: 2008; Label: Square Records; Formats: CD, Digital Download | - |

=== Television ===
| Year | Reality Show | Roles | Notes |
|---|---|---|---|
| 2014 | The Alingos | Themselves | An Animated Series, inspired by "the need to create unique content for children and fill the vacuum in the media sphere". |
| 2015 | Dance with Peter | Judge (Peter P-Square) | A Dance Reality Show, brought into existence a novel dimension to dancing, its rudiments, the intrigues of competitiveness and an exciting display of talents. |

=== Films ===
| Film | Year | Director | Character | Description |
|---|---|---|---|---|
| Lionheart | 2018 | Genevieve Nnaji | Peter P-Square as Arinze | The first Netflix Nigeria Film, explored the themes of family bonds, entrepreneurship, gender equality, and societal transformation. |

== Awards and nominations ==
P-Square awards and nominations
Awards and nominations
| Award | Wins | Nominations |
| The Headies | 9 | 27 |
| City Mag 9th Awards Show 4 | 1 | 5 |
| Nigerian Music Awards (NMA) | 7 | 7 |
| Channel O Music Video Awards | 5 | 6 |
| MTV Africa Music Awards | 5 | 16 |
| AFRIMMA | 1 | 2 |
| Lil Perry Productions | 1 | 1 |
| BET Awards | 0 | 1 |
| MOBO Awards | 0 | 4 |
| Ghana Music Awards | 6 | 2 |
| 4Syte TV MVA | 1 | 1 |
| Soul Train Music Awards | 0 | 1 |
| AEAUSA Awards | 1 | 2 |
| AFRIMA | 1 | 1 |
| NEA Awards | 2 | 2 |
| MTV Europe Music Awards | 0 | 4 |
| KORA Awards | 5 | 6 |
| Future Awards | 1 | 2 |
| Soundcity MVA | 5 | 6 |

Totals (Note: Certain award groups do not simply award one winner. They acknowledge several different recipients, have runners-up, and have third place. Since this is a specific recognition and is different from losing an award, runner-up mentions are considered wins in this award tally. For simplification and to avoid errors, each award in this list has been presumed to have had a prior nomination.)
- Wins: 51
- Nominations: 94

MTV Europe Music Awards

| Year | Nominee / work | Award | Result |
|---|---|---|---|
| 2006 | P-Square | "Best African Act" | Nominated |
| 2013 | P-Square | "Best African Act" | Nominated |
| 2015 | P-Square | "Artist of the Decade" | Nominated |
| 2015 | P-Square | "Best Group" | Nominated |

Soul Train Music Awards

| Year | Nominee / work | Award | Result |
|---|---|---|---|
| 2013 | "Personally" | "Best International Performance" | Nominated |

The Headies

| Year | Nominee / work | Award | Result |
|---|---|---|---|
| 2006 | Get Squared | "Best R&B/Pop Album" | Won |
| 2006 | Get Squared | "Album of the Year" | Won |
| 2006 | "Get Squared" | "Best Music Video" | Won |
| 2006 | "Bizzy Body" | "Song of the Year" | Won |
| 2006 | P-Square | "Artiste of the Year" | Won |

City Mag 9th Awards Show

| Year | Nominee / work | Award | Result |
|---|---|---|---|
| 2006 | P-Square | "Best Hip Hop Group" | Won |

Nigerian Music Awards (NMA)

| Year | Nominee / work | Award | Result |
|---|---|---|---|
| 2006 | Get Squared | "Album of the Year" | Won |
| 2006 | "Get Squared" | "Music Video of the Year" | Won |

Channel O Music Video Awards

| Year | Nominee / work | Award | Result |
|---|---|---|---|
| 2007 | P-Square | "Best Duo or Group" | Won |
| 2008 | P-Square | "Best Duo or Group" | Won |
| 2008 | "Do Me" | "Video of the Year" | Won |
| 2012 | P-Square | "Most Gifted Group of the Year" | Won |
| 2013 | "Alingo" | "Most Gifted African (West) Video" | Won |
| 2013 | "Alingo" | "Most Gifted Video of the Year" | Nominated |

MTV Africa Music Awards

| Year | Nominee / work | Award | Result |
|---|---|---|---|
| 2008 | P-Square | "Best Group" | Won |
| 2008 | P-Square | "Artist of the Year" | Nominated |
| 2008 | P-Square | "Best R&B" | Nominated |
| 2008 | "Roll It" | "Best Video" | Nominated |
| 2009 | P-Square | "Best Group" | Won |
| 2009 | P-Square | "Best Live Performer" | Nominated |
| 2014 | P-Square | Best Group | Nominated |
| 2014 | P-Square | Artist of the Year | Nominated |
| 2014 | "Personally" | Song of the Year | Nominated |
| 2015 | "P-Square" | Artiste of the decade | Won |

Lil Perry Productions

| Year | Nominee / work | Award | Result |
|---|---|---|---|
| 2010 | P-Square | "Producer of the Year" | Won |

MOBO Awards

| Year | Nominee / work | Award | Result |
|---|---|---|---|
| 2006 | P-Square | "Best African Act" | Nominated |
| 2008 | P-Square | "Best African Act" | Nominated |
| 2010 | P-Square | "Best African Act" | Nominated |
| 2012 | P-Square | "Best African Act" | Nominated |

KORA Awards

| Year | Nominee / work | Award | Result |
|---|---|---|---|
| 2003 | P-Square | "Most Promising African Group" | Nominated |
| 2010 | P-Square | "Artiste of the Year" | Won |

BET Awards

| Year | Nominee / work | Award | Result |
|---|---|---|---|
| 2010 | P-Square | "Best International Act" | Nominated |

Ghana Music Awards

| Year | Nominee / work | Award | Result |
|---|---|---|---|
| 2014 | P-Square | "African Artiste of the Year" | Nominated |
| 2013 | P-Square | "African Artiste of the Year" | Nominated |

== Concert tours ==
- P-Square North American tour (2010)
- USA/Canada tour (2013)
- Double Trouble World tour (2014)
- 100 cities world tour (2022)
