= May D =

Nigerian singer

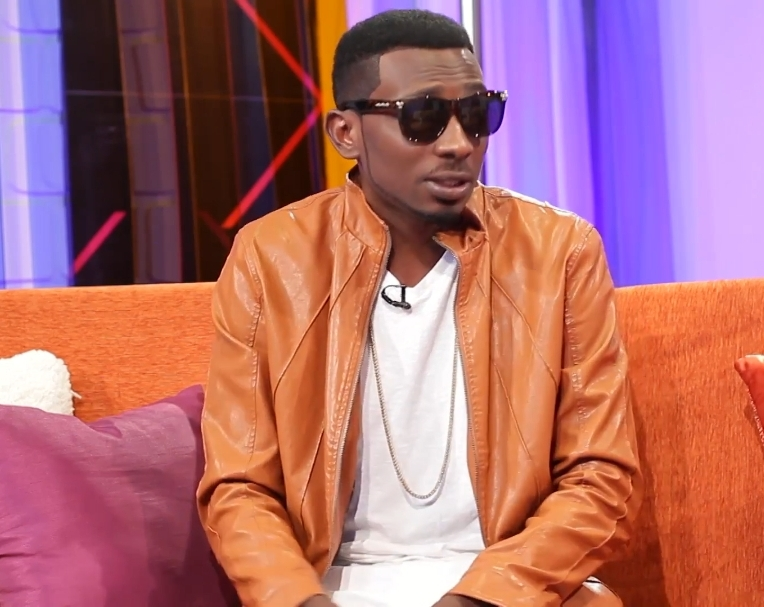
- Born: Akinmayokun Awodumila; Delta State, Nigeria
- Other name: Mr May D
- Education: University of Lagos
- Occupations: Singer, songwriter, dancer
- Years active: 2011–present
- Musical career
- Genres: Afropop, R&B, house, Afrobeat
- Label: Confam Entertainment Davido Music Worldwide

Akinmayokun Awodumila (born 28 December 1984), popularly known as May D, is a Nigerian singer. He was formally signed to R&B duo P-Square's record label Square Records.

== Biography ==
May D was born Akinmayokun Awodumila in Lagos into a family of seven. He attended the University of Lagos, where he studied mass communication.

He rose to stardom in the same year he got signed to the label Square Records, in 2011. On 21 August 2012, it was officially announced that May D was no longer in the label, as stated by Premium Times news.

On 13 May 2011, May D released his first single "Soundtrack" via the label Square Records. The music video, directed by Clarence Peters, was released on 12 January 2012. The video originally had over 10 million views on their YouTube channel before being deleted by the label. On 25 September 2012, May D founded an independent record label known as Confam Entertainment. On 18 July 2020, May D announced on his Twitter handle that he had signed with Davido Music Worldwide.

== Discography ==
=== Studio albums and EPs ===
- Chapter One (2013)
- SUREBOY (2021)

=== As lead artist ===
List of singles as lead artist, showing year released and album name
Year	Title	Album	Release date
2011	"Soundtrack"	Chapter One	16 May 2013
2012	"Use Me"	Chapter One	16 May 2013
2012	"Ile Ijo"	Chapter One	16 May 2013
2012	"Gat Me High"	Chapter One	16 May 2013
2012	"One Night Stand"	Non-album	
2013	"You Want to Know Me" (feat. P-Square)	Chapter One	16 May 2013
2013	"Ur Eyes" (feat. Davido)	Chapter One	16 May 2013
2013	"So Many Tinz"	Chapter One	16 May 2013
2013	"Love in the Air"	Non-album	
2014	"All Over You"	Non-album	
2014	"Ibadi"	Non-album	
2016	"Bamilo" (feat. Wizkid)	Non-album	
2016	"Hustle" (feat. Akon and Davido)	Non-album	24 October 2016
2018	"Love Overdose"	TBA	
2019	"Dada"	Non-album	21 November 2019
2020	"Time for You "	Non-album	10 February 2020
2021	"Dodo "	Non-album	20 August 2021

=== As featured artist ===
List of singles as featured artist, showing year released and album name
Year	Title	Artist name(s)	Album	Release date
2010	"Farabale"	Show Dem Camp	The Dreamer Project	18 September 2011
2010	"Eyes On Me"	Show Dem Camp	The Dreamer Project	18 September 2011
2011	"Chop My Money"	P-Square	The Invasion	29 July 2011
2012	"Chop My Money (Remix)"	P-Square	The Invasion	29 July 2011
2012	"Bless Me"	Davido	Omo Baba Olowo	17 July 2012
2012	"Mujo"	Sina Rambo	Non-album	
2012	"Coming for You"	Mo'Cheddah	Non-album	
2012	"Way You Whine (Remix)"	Dpzle	Non-album	
2012	"No Time"	DJ Xclusive	Non-album	
2013	"Whine"	Iyanya	Desire	6 February 2013
2013	"Happiness"	Mafikizolo	Reunited	10 April 2013
2013	"Madantin (Remix)"	Jaywon	Oba Orin	1 April 2016
2013	"Peperenpe (Remix)"	Klever J	That Klever Jay	27 March 2015
2013	"Banger"	Durella	Non-album	
2014	"My #1 (Numero Uno)"	DJ Neptune	Non-album	
2014	"Jigololo"	Eddyaya	Non-album	
2014	"Give Your Love to Me"	Fliptyce	Non-album	
2014	"Wiggle"	Mo'Blow	Non-album	
2014	"Love in the Air (EDM Remix)"	Fliptyce	Non-album	
2015	"Up in the Club"	N6	Non-album	
2015	"Amina"	Ikechukwu	Non-album	
2015	"Birthday Girl"	Samklef	Non-album	

== Awards and nominations ==
Year	Awards ceremony	Award description(s)	Recipient	Results	Ref
2012	Nigeria Entertainment Awards	Best New Act of the Year	Himself	Nominated	
2013	City People Entertainment Awards	Best New Musician of the Year (Male)	Himself	Nominated	
2015	Nigerian Music Video Awards (NMVA)	Best Use of Dance in a Video (Ibadi)	Song	Won	
