= Hip Hop World Magazine =

Nigeria music magazine

Hip Hop World Magazine is a weekly Nigerian music magazine established in 1995. It has sponsored The Headies award since the award's inception in 2006. The magazine's publisher is Nigerian journalist and music promoter Ayo Animashaun.
