= Weird MC =

Nigerian rapper (born 1970)

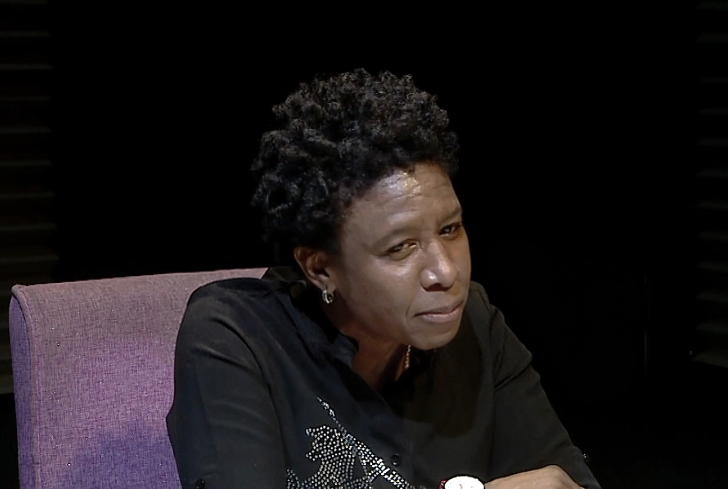
- Born: Adesola Adesimbo Idowu; 9 July 1966 (age 60); England
- Occupation: Rapper

Weird MC (born Adesola Adesimbo Idowu on 9 July 1966) is a Nigerian-British rapper, songwriter, and producer. Known for her English/Yoruba lyrics, Weird MC, who is also known as Shola Idowu and The Rappatainer, is one of Africa’s most popular female rappers, and one of the few Nigerian female artists associated with Afrobeat.

== Early life ==
Ogun-native Idowu was born in the United Kingdom to conservative parents who disapproved of their daughter pursuing a career in entertainment. She attended Maryland Comprehensive Secondary School, Lagos, where she made friends with four other girls with whom she formed the hip-hop group Weirdos. Despite their popularity on the campus circuit, they failed to land a record deal and soon disbanded. Idowu subsequently gained admission into Ogun State University to study Law, although she left after a year to focus on her music career and later gained a qualification in Music Technology. Before this she aspired to become a basketball player, but as the Nigerian Sports Commission did not fully support women in this field, Idowu returned to the UK with the intention of emigrating to America and pursure her ambition.

== Music career ==
=== 1990-1996: Early career ===
Influenced by Fela Kuti, Miriam Makeba, Queen Latifah and Jimi Hendrix, Idowu competed in various rap battles including Club 291 contest, similar to America's Apollo, in which she came third. She toured the UK with DJ P Tee Money in the later half of 1990 and throughout 1991. In 1992, after working with music producer Kevin Best for two months, Idowu released the single "I Wanna Make You Jack/Let's Get Wet", which received positive reviews from music critics and reached number one in the Choice FM charts. By now, Idowu had begun to use the name by which she is now known - Weird MC, which was coined from the name of her former group.

=== 1997: Simply Weird ===
In 1996, Idowu returned to her homeland where she released the album Simply Weird - a blend of American hip hop and afrobeat - and featured the self-produced video-single "Allen Avenue", making her the first Nigerian artist to release a song via that medium. Although Simply Weird has been described as the first full-length hip hop album, this milestone had been reached nearly a decade earlier by Nigerian-American band Sound on Sound with the album From Africa From Scratch, and Pidgin rap duo Junior and Pretty were also a household name in the early nineties. Despite the popularity of "Allen Avenue", Simply Weird failed to sell an impressive number of copies; critics agreed that it was ahead of its time. However, Idowu was honoured with several awards, including the very first AMEN award for Best Hip Hop Album.

=== 2006: After the Storm ===
In 2006, Idowu released her second album, After Da Storm. Hip hop was now recognised as a major form of music in Nigeria, and the Don Jazzy and JJC-produced single "Ijoya" was a massive success, earning her an AMEN award for Most Pop Song, and a Channel O Music Video Award for Best Special Effect.

== Other work ==
Apart from being a solo artiste, Idowu has collaborated with other artists including Femi Kuti and close friend Kween, and in 2010 she was the last woman remaining in the celebrity version of reality show Gulder Ultimate Search. In various interviews she has spoken of how she was discriminated against by her male counterparts in Nigeria's hip-hop industry, and has criticised its females rappers for not persevering in order to earn their place in the music industry.

== Award and nominations ==
=== Nominations ===
- 2007: The Headies - Artiste of the Year
