= Clarence Peters =

Nigerian music video director, filmmaker and cinematographer

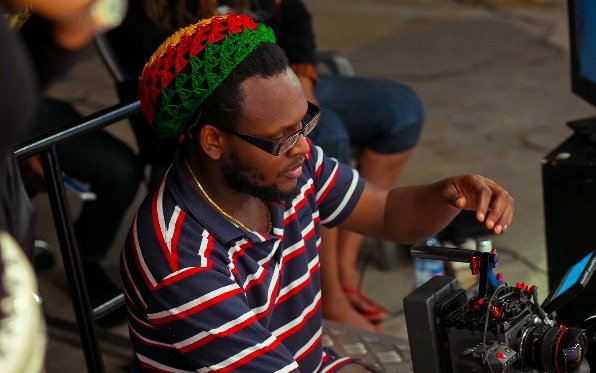
- Clarence Peters on the set of a music video in 2013
- Born: Clarence Abiodun Peters; 20 December 1983 (age 42); Ibadan, Oyo State, Nigeria
- Education: Government College Ikorodu; City Varsity
- Occupations: Filmmaker; cinematographer; music video director
- Years active: 1998–present
- Known for: founding CAPital Dream Pictures and Capital Hill Records
- Parent(s): Clarion Chukwura (mother); Sir Shina Peters (father)
- Website: clarencepeters.com

Clarence Abiodun Peters (born 20 December 1983) is a Nigerian music video director, filmmaker and cinematographer. He is the founder and CEO of Capital Dream Pictures, a production company that specializes in performing arts, film and video. Peters owns Capital Hill Records, a record label that was home to Chidinma, Tha Suspect, and Illbliss. He was ranked second on Channel O's list of the Top 10 Most Visionary Music Video Directors.

== Life and career ==
Peters is the son of Sir Shina Peters, a musician, and Clarion Chukwura, an actress from Anambra State. In an interview with the Daily Times, his mother opened up about wanting to abort him while he was in her womb, but changed her mind because of her belief that he was the reincarnation of her father whom she lost when she was 11 years old. Peters played football while growing up, and attended Beehive Primary School and Government College Ikorodu. After finishing secondary school, he worked at Alpha Visions for three years before studying cinematography at City Varsity, a film school in Cape Town. Upon returning to Nigeria, Peters teamed up with a group of filmmakers to establish the Alliance Film Company, which is now known as the Allied Film Company. Peters worked with the company for a year and eventually started his own production company, Capital Dream Pictures.

Peters has cited Steven Spielberg, Hype Williams, DJ Tee, Akin Alabi, Wudi Awa, HG2 Filmworks, Kemi Adetiba, Sesan, Aje, and AK 1 as people he admires. In 1998, Peters was involved in a Mobil-sponsored music video for a documentary on AIDS. He directed 40 episodes of the television series Everyday People, and has filmed music videos for several recording artists, including Darey, Durella, and Wizkid. In 2012, he filmed the music video for Shuga's theme song, which was recorded by Boneye, Banky W., Wizkid and L-Tido. Peters has also directed several documentaries, TV commercials, short films, and TV features. In April 2014, Absolut Vodka honoured him for his creativity. In September 2015, Peters announced plans to premiere his 25-minute horror film Hex; the film's official trailer was released on 28 September 2015.

=== Capital Hill Music ===
Peters met record producer Tha Suspect while in secondary school. The two started a group after becoming acquainted with each other. Capital Hill Records was formed after Peters returned to Nigeria from South Africa. He and Tha Suspect decided to look for a female artist who could rap and sing. At a later date, Peters signed rapper Kel to Capital Hill after being introduced to her by Terry tha Rapman. In September 2010, Kel's recording contract with the label was terminated after she had a misunderstanding with Peters. Kel managed to release her debut studio album, The Investment, while signed to the label. Latterly, the label partnered with the Goretti Company, a management company owned by Illbliss.

=== Controversies ===
In January 2014, a copyright infringement was filed against Peters after the release of Tiwa Savage's "Eminado" video. He allegedly stole the vintage nature of Tumi and the Volume's "Asinamali" video, which was released to honour the artistic works of Seydou Keïta. Tumi slandered Peters on Twitter and urged his fans to shine a light on the issue. Tunji "Tee Billz" Balogun, who is Savage's former manager and ex-husband, said he and his ex-wife never knew that the video's concept was adopted from another video and were surprised like everyone else.

Following the launch of Ice Prince's "V.I.P" music video on June 21, 2013, Peters faced allegations of having copied scenes from Slaughterhouse's "My Life" video and including them in the "V.I.P" video. In February 2014, Ice Prince defended Peters' actions and said he told him the ideas to shoot. Additionally, he stated that anyone who finds the situation problematic should hold him accountable.

In April 2016, Peters faced criticism for directing Flavour's "Dance" video, which was widely compared to Justin Bieber's "Sorry" video. Observers noted that the choreography, white background, and colorful costumes closely resembled Bieber's video, with only minor changes to Flavour's appearance. The incident was described by media outlets as a clear replication rather than a reinterpretation.

== Awards and nominations ==
| Year | Event | Prize | Recipient | Result | Ref |
|---|---|---|---|---|---|
| 2014 | City People Entertainment Awards | Best Music Video Director of the Year | Himself | Nominated | |
| 2014 | 2014 Nigeria Entertainment Awards | Best Music Video of the Year (Artist & Director) | "Eminado" (Tiwa Savage featuring Don Jazzy) | Nominated | |
| 2014 | 2014 Nigeria Entertainment Awards | Best Music Video of the Year (Artist & Director) | "Oh! Baby (You & I)" (featuring Flavour N'abania) | Nominated | |
| 2014 | African Muzik Magazine Awards | Best Video Director | Himself | Nominated | |
| 2014 | MTV Africa Music Awards 2014 | Best Video | | Won | |
| 2014 | MTV Africa Music Awards 2014 | Transform Today by Absolut | Himself | Won | |
| 2013 | The Headies 2013 | Best Music Video Director | "Alingo" ^{[A]} | Won | |
| 2013 | The Headies 2013 | Best Music Video Director | "Yes/No" | Nominated | |
| 2013 | Nigeria Entertainment Awards | Music Video of the Year | "Skibo" by Solid Star | Nominated | |
| 2013 | Nigeria Music Video Awards | Best Director | Himself | Won | |
| 2013 | Nigeria Music Video Awards | Best Cinematography | "Durosoke" by Olamide | Won | |
| 2013 | Nigeria Music Video Awards | Best Editor | "Durosoke" by Olamide | —N/a | |
| 2012 | The Headies 2012 | Best Music Video Director | "5 & 6" by Naeto C | Nominated | |
| 2012 | Nigeria Entertainment Awards | Best Music Video of the Year | "Pakurumo" by Wizkid | Nominated | |
| 2012 | Nigeria Music Video Awards | Best Director | "Kedike" by Chidinma | Nominated | |
| 2012 | Nigeria Music Video Awards | Best Cinematography | "Kedike" by Chidinma | Won | |
| 2012 | Nigeria Music Video Awards | Best Editor | "Kedike" by Chidinma | Nominated | |
| 2011 | The Headies 2011 | Best Music Video Director | "You Know It" by Goldie Harvey | Nominated | |
| 2011 | Nigeria Entertainment Awards | Best Music Video of The Year | "If You Ask Me" by Omawumi | Nominated | |
| 2011 | Nigeria Music Video Awards | Best Director | Himself | Nominated | |
| 2011 | Nigeria Music Video Awards | Best Cinematography | "5 & 6" by Naeto C | Nominated | |
| 2011 | Nigeria Music Video Awards | Best Editor | Himself | Nominated | |
| 2010 | The Headies 2010 | Best Music Video Director | "Finest" by Knight House (featuring Sauce Kid and Teeto) | Won | |
| 2010 | Nigeria Entertainment Awards | Best Female Music Video of The Year | "You Know It" by Goldie Harvey | Nominated | |
| 2010 | Nigeria Entertainment Awards | Best Female Music Video of The Year | "If You Want Me" by Mo'Cheddah | Nominated | |
| 2010 | Nigeria Music Video Awards | Best Director | Himself | Won | |
| 2010 | Nigeria Music Video Awards | Best Editor | Himself | Won | |
| 2010 | Nigeria Music Video Awards | Best Cinematography | "You Know It" by Goldie Harvey | Nominated | |
| 2009 | Nigeria Music Video Awards | Best Director | "Oko Won Lode" by Sound Sultan | Nominated | |
| 2009 | Nigeria Music Video Awards | Best Cinematography | "Oko Won Lode" by Sound Sultan | Nominated | |
| 2008 | The Headies 2008 | Best Music Video Director | "Sasha" | Nominated | |

== See also ==
- List of Nigerian film producers
- List of Nigerian cinematographers
- List of Nigerian film directors
