= List of awards and nominations received by 2Baba =

2Baba awards and nominations
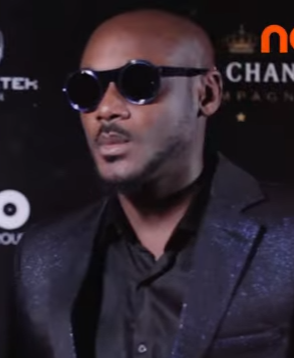
- 2Baba at the release of his album, The Ascension (2014)
Awards and nominations
| Award | Wins | Nominations |
| Affinity Awards | 1 | 1 |
| African Muzik Magazine Awards | 0 | 1 |
| All Africa Music Awards | 2 | 2 |
| AMEN Awards | 5 | 9 |
| Ben TV Awards | 2 | 3 |
| City People Entertainment Awards | 1 | 2 |
| Channel O Music Video Awards | 8 | 11 |
| Ghana Music Awards | 1 | 1 |
| The Headies | 10 | 35 |
| Kora Awards | 2 | 2 |
| MOBO Awards | 1 | 2 |
| MTV Africa Music Awards | 4 | 8 |
| MTV Europe Music Awards | 0 | 1 |
| NET Honours | 2 | 2 |
| Nigeria Entertainment Awards | 7 | 12 |
| Nigerian Music Video Awards | 5 | 10 |
| SoundCity Music Video Awards | 2 | 9 |
| ThisDay Awards | 1 | 1 |
| World Music Awards | 2 | 5 |

Totals (Note: Certain award groups do not simply award one winner. They acknowledge several different recipients, have runners-up, and have third place. Since this is a specific recognition and is different from losing an award, runner-up mentions are considered wins in this award tally. For simplification and to avoid errors, each award in this list has been presumed to have had a prior nomination.)
- Wins: 66
- Nominations: 140

This is a list of major music awards and nominations received by Nigerian musician 2Baba.

== Affinity Awards ==
| Year | Nominee / work | Award | Result |
|---|---|---|---|
| 2002 | Himself | Best Male Vocalist | Won |

== African Muzik Magazine Awards ==
| Year | Nominee / work | Award | Result |
|---|---|---|---|
| 2014 | "Rainbow (Remix)" (featuring T-Pain) | Best Collabo | Nominated |

== Afro Nollywood Awards ==
| Year | Nominee / work | Award | Result |
|---|---|---|---|
| 2005 | Himself | Best Musical Artiste | Won |

== All Africa Music Awards ==
| Year | Nominee / work | Award | Result |
|---|---|---|---|
| 2019 | Himself | Legend of the Year | Won |
| 2019 | Himself | Best Artist, Duo or Group in African Contemporary | Won |

== AMEN Awards ==
| Year | Nominee / work | Award | Result |
|---|---|---|---|
| 2004 | Himself | Best Male Vocalist | Won |
| 2004 | "African Queen" | Song of the Year | Won |
| 2004 | Himself | Best New Act (Male) | Won |
| 2004 | "African Queen" | Best Video | Won |
| 2007 | Himself | Best Male Vocalist | Nominated |
| 2007 | "For Instance" | Song of the Year | Nominated |
| 2007 | "True Love" | Best R&B Song | Nominated |
| 2007 | Grass 2 Grace | Best Pop Album | Nominated |
| 2007 | Grass 2 Grace | Album of the Year | Won |

== Australian African Awards ==
| Year | Nominee / work | Award | Result |
|---|---|---|---|
| 2008 | Himself | Best African Act | Won |

== Ben TV Awards ==
| Year | Nominee / work | Award | Result |
|---|---|---|---|
| 2014 | The Ascension | Album of the Year | Won |
| 2014 | "Rainbow (Remix)" (featuring T-Pain) | Best International Collaboration | Won |
| 2014 | "Hold On" (Joe EL featuring 2Face Idibia) | Best Collaboration | Nominated |

== Black Heritage Awards for Excellence ==
| Year | Nominee / work | Award | Result |
|---|---|---|---|
| 2005 | Himself | The Outstanding Musician of the Year | Won |

== City People Awards for Excellence ==
| Year | Nominee / work | Award | Result |
|---|---|---|---|
| 2004 | Himself | Musician of the Year | Won |
| 2005 | "African Queen" | Best Male Video | Won |
| 2011 | Himself | Best Musician of the Year | Won |

== City People Entertainment Awards ==
| Year | Nominee / work | Award | Result |
|---|---|---|---|
| 2013 | "Ihe Neme" | Most Popular Song of the Year | Nominated |
| 2017 | Himself | Music Industry Giant | Won |

== Channel O Music Video Awards ==
| Year | Nominee / work | Award | Result |
|---|---|---|---|
| 2005 | "African Queen" | Best Male Video | Won |
| 2005 | "African Queen" | Best African Video of the Year | Won |
| 2005 | Himself | Best African Act | Won |
| 2006 | "Ole" | Best African Pop Video | Won |
| 2006 | "Ole" | Best African West Video | Won |
| 2006 | "Ole" | Best R&B Video | Nominated |
| 2010 | "Implication" | Most Gifted West African Video | Won |
| 2011 | "Only Me" | Most Gifted African West Video | Won |
| 2011 | "Only Me" | Most Gifted Video of the Year | Nominated |
| 2012 | "Be There" | Most Gifted R&B Music Video of the Year | Nominated |
| 2013 | "Ihe Neme" | Most Gifted Afro Pop Video | Nominated |
| 2014 | "Rainbow (Remix)" (featuring T-Pain) | Most Gifted R&B Music Video of the Year | Won |

== COSON Song Awards ==
| Year | Nominee / work | Award | Result |
|---|---|---|---|
| 2017 | "Officially Blind" | Best Song in Lyrics | Nominated |
| 2017 | "Coded Tinz" (featuring Phyno) | Best Collaboration Song | Nominated |

== Excellence Awards ==
| Year | Nominee / work | Award | Result |
|---|---|---|---|
| 2004 | Himself | Music of the Year | Won |
| 2004 | Himself | Outstanding Contribution to the Entertainment Industry | Won |

== The Future Awards ==
| Year | Nominee / work | Award | Result |
|---|---|---|---|
| 2006 | Himself | Musician of the Year | Won |

== G.C.E International Awards ==
| Year | Nominee / work | Award | Result |
|---|---|---|---|
| 2005 | "African Queen" | Best Song of the Year | Won |

== Ghana Music Awards ==
| Year | Nominee / work | Award | Result |
|---|---|---|---|
| 2005 | "African Queen" | African Song of The Year (Non Ghanaian) | Won |

== The Headies ==
| Year | Nominee / work | Award | Result |
|---|---|---|---|
| 2006 | Himself | Special Recognition | Won |
| 2007 | "For Instance" | Song of the Year | Nominated |
| 2008 | Grass 2 Grace | Best R&B/Pop Album | Won |
| 2008 | Grass 2 Grace | Album of the Year | Nominated |
| 2008 | "See Me So" | Song of the Year | Nominated |
| 2008 | "Stylee" (DJ Jimmy Jatt featuring Mode 9, 2Face Idibia & Elajoe) | Song of the Year | Nominated |
| 2008 | "Stylee" (DJ Jimmy Jatt featuring Mode 9, 2Face Idibia & Elajoe) | Best Rap Single | Nominated |
| 2008 | "Stylee" (DJ Jimmy Jatt featuring Mode 9, 2Face Idibia & Elajoe) | Best Collabo | Won |
| 2008 | "Stylee" (DJ Jimmy Jatt featuring Mode 9, 2Face Idibia & Elajoe) | Best Vocal Performance (Male) | Nominated |
| 2008 | "True Love" | Best Recording of the Year | Nominated |
| 2008 | Himself | Artiste of the Year | Nominated |
| 2009 | The Unstoppable | Best R&B/Pop Album | Nominated |
| 2009 | The Unstoppable | Album of the Year | Nominated |
| 2009 | "Can't Do Without You" (featuring Melissa Briggs) | Best Recording of the Year | Nominated |
| 2009 | "Street Credibility" | Best Recording of the Year | Nominated |
| 2009 | "Street Credibility" | Best Collaboration | Nominated |
| 2009 | "Ole (Bushmeat)" (Sound Sultan featuring 2Face Idibia and W4) | Best Collaboration | Nominated |
| 2011 | The Unstoppable International Edition | Best R&B/Pop Album | Won |
| 2011 | The Unstoppable International Edition | Album of the Year | Won |
| 2011 | "Only Me" | Song of the Year | Nominated |
| 2011 | "Raindrops" | Best Recording of the Year | Nominated |
| 2011 | "Only Me" | Best R&B Single | Nominated |
| 2011 | Himself | Artiste of the Year | Won |
| 2013 | Away & Beyond | Best R&B/Pop Album | Nominated |
| 2013 | "Ihe Neme" | Best Pop Single | Won |
| 2013 | "Baby Mi Da (Baby Jowo Remix)" (Victor Uwaifo featuring 2Face Idibia) | Best Collabo | Nominated |
| 2014 | Himself | Artiste of the Year | Won |
| 2014 | "Let Somebody Love You" (featuring Bridget Kelly) | Best R&B Single | Won |
| 2014 | "Let Somebody Love You" (featuring Bridget Kelly) | Best Recording of the Year | Nominated |
| 2015 | "Hold On" (Joe EL featuring 2Face Idibia) | Best Collaboration | Nominated |
| 2015 | Himself | Hall of Fame | Nominated |
| 2018 | "Holy Holy" | Best Reggae/Dancehall Single | Won |
| 2018 | "Amaka" (featuring Peruzzi) | Best Collabo | Nominated |
| 2018 | Himself | Best Performer | Nominated |
| 2022 | Himself | Humanitarian Award of the Year | Nominated |

== Kora Awards ==
| Year | Nominee / work | Award | Result |
|---|---|---|---|
| 2005 | Himself | Best African Act | Won |
| 2005 | Himself | Most Promising Male Artist of Africa | Won |

== MOBO Awards ==
| Year | Nominee / work | Award | Result |
|---|---|---|---|
| 2005 | Himself | Best African Act | Nominated |
| 2007 | Himself | Best African Act | Won |

== MTV Africa Music Awards ==
| Year | Nominee / work | Award | Result |
|---|---|---|---|
| 2008 | Himself | Best Male | Nominated |
| 2009 | Himself | Best Male | Won |
| 2009 | Himself | Best R&B | Won |
| 2009 | "Enter the Place" | Best Video | Nominated |
| 2009 | Himself | Artist of the Year | Nominated |
| 2010 | Himself | Artist of the Year | Won |
| 2010 | Himself | Best Male | Won |
| 2014 | Himself | Best Live Act | Nominated |

== MTV Europe Music Awards ==
| Year | Nominee / work | Award | Result |
|---|---|---|---|
| 2005 | Himself | Best African Act | Nominated |

== NET Honours ==
| Year | Nominee / work | Award | Result |
|---|---|---|---|
| 2021 | Himself | Most Popular Musician (Male) | Nominated |
| 2022 | Himself | Most Popular Musician (Male) | Nominated |

== Nigeria Entertainment Awards ==
| Year | Nominee / work | Award | Result |
|---|---|---|---|
| 2006 | Himself | Africa Breakthrough Artist of the Year | Won |
| 2007 | Grass 2 Grace | Best Album of the Year | Won |
| 2009 | The Unstoppable | Best Album of the Year | Nominated |
| 2010 | The Unstoppable International Edition | Best Album of the Year | Nominated |
| 2010 | "Nobody" (M.I featuring 2Face Idibia) | Best Collaboration with Vocals | Nominated |
| 2010 | "Implication" | Best Male Music Video of the Year | Won |
| 2010 | Himself | Best Soul/Neo Soul Act of the Year | Won |
| 2011 | Himself | Best Pop/R&B Artist of the Year | Nominated |
| 2012 | Himself | Best Entertainment Personality | Nominated |
| 2015 | Himself | Afrobeats Artiste of the Year | Won |
| 2016 | Himself | Best Live Performer | Won |
| 2018 | Himself | Afropop Male Artist | Won |

== Nigerian Music Awards ==
| Year | Nominee / work | Award | Result |
|---|---|---|---|
| 2010 | "Only Me" | Song of the Decade | Won |

== Nigerian Music Video Awards ==
| Year | Nominee / work | Award | Result |
|---|---|---|---|
| 2010 | "Only Me" | Best Afro Pop Video | Won |
| 2010 | "Only Me" | Video of the Year | Won |
| 2012 | "Raindrops" | Best Reggae/Dancehall Video | Nominated |
| 2012 | "Ihe Neme" | Best Visual Effects | Won |
| 2012 | "Ihe Neme" | Best Contemporary Afro | Nominated |
| 2013 | "Dance Floor" | Best Afro Pop Video | Won |
| 2013 | "Baby Mi Da" | Best High Life Video | Nominated |
| 2014 | "Spiritual Healing" | Best Use of Visual Effects | Nominated |
| 2014 | "Let Somebody Love You" | Best R&B Video | Nominated |
| 2016 | Himself | Peace Ambassador | Won |

== SoundCity Music Video Awards ==
| Year | Nominee / work | Award | Result |
|---|---|---|---|
| 2008 | "If Love is a Crime" | Best Video | Nominated |
| 2009 | "Enter the Place" | Best Cinematography | Nominated |
| 2009 | "Enter the Place" | Best Collaboration in a Music Video | Nominated |
| 2009 | "Enter the Place" | SoundCity Viewer's Choice | Nominated |
| 2009 | "No Be Small Thing" | Best Collaboration in a Music Video | Nominated |
| 2009 | "Enter the Place" | Best Video | Nominated |
| 2010 | Himself | Best Western | Won |
| 2010 | "Implication" | Best Pop Video | Won |
| 2010 | "Implication" | Best Male Video | Nominated |

== Soundcity MVP Awards Festival ==
| Year | Nominee / work | Award | Result |
|---|---|---|---|
| 2017 | Himself | Best Male MVP | Nominated |
| 2017 | "Gaga Shuffle" | Song of the Year | Nominated |
| 2017 | "Gaga Shuffle" | Viewer's Choice | Nominated |
| 2017 | "Gaga Shuffle" | Listener's Choice | Nominated |
| 2018 | "Amaka" | Best Collaboration | Nominated |
| 2018 | "Amaka" | Song of the Year | Nominated |

== ThisDay Awards ==
| Year | Nominee / work | Award | Result |
|---|---|---|---|
| 2011 | Himself | New Champions for an Enduring Culture | Won |

== World Music Awards ==
| Year | Nominee / work | Award | Result |
|---|---|---|---|
| 2005 | Himself | Male Entertainer of the Year | Won |
| 2008 | Himself | Best Selling Nigerian Artist | Won |
| 2014 | Himself | Africa's World Best Male Artiste | Nominated |
| 2014 | Himself | Africa's World Best Live Act in 2014 | Nominated |
| 2014 | Himself | Africa's World Best Entertainer of the Year | Nominated |
