= Spellz production discography =

- Studio albums: 11
- Internet albums: 2
- Compilation albums: 1
- EPs: 1
- Singles: 20

The following list is a discography of production by Spellz, a Nigeria record producer from Lagos State.

== Singles produced ==
Title	Year	Album	Release date
"Gaga Crazy" (Chuddy K)	2011	Non-album single	4 December 2011
"Mu Number" (9ice)	2011	Bashorun Gaa	19 May 2011
"On Point" (Faze)	2011	Non-album single	20 August 2011
"Roll It" (E.M.E (feat. Wizkid & Banky W.)	2012	Empire Mates State of Mind	18 June 2012
"London Girl" (E.M.E (feat. Wizkid)	2012	Empire Mates State of Mind	18 June 2012
"Change" (E.M.E (feat. Banky W.)	2012	Empire Mates State of Mind	18 June 2012
"Don't Delay Me (Don't Go There)" (E.M.E (feat. Niyola)	2012	Empire Mates State of Mind	18 June 2012
"Follow Go House" (E.M.E (feat. Skales, Shaydee & Banky W.)	2012	Empire Mates State of Mind	18 June 2012
"Find My Trouble" (E.M.E (feat. Banky W., Shaydee & Skales)	2012	Empire Mates State of Mind	18 June 2012
"Because of Love" (D'Prince (feat. Bracket)	2012	Frenzy!	5 November 2012
"Ojoro" (D'Prince (feat. Wande Coal)	2012	Frenzy!	5 November 2012
"Ima Bom" (Chuddy K)	2013	Non-album	
"Folarin" (Tiwa Savage)	2013	Once Upon a Time	3 July 2013
"Shout out" (Tiwa Savage feat. Iceberg Slim and Sarkodie)	2013	Once Upon a Time	3 July 2013
"Eji Ma Fia" (Tiwa Savage)	2013	Once Upon a Time	3 July 2013
"Stand as One" (Tiwa Savage feat. General Pype)	2013	Once Upon a Time	3 July 2013
"Onye" (Waje (feat. Tiwa Savage)	2013	W.A.J.E	1 January 2013
"Love In Yellow" (Tiwa Savage)	2014	Non-album	
"Headache" (DJ Kentalky (feat. Yemi Alade & Dammy Krane)	2014	Non-album	
"Shakam" (Shaydee)	2014	Non-album	
"Check and Balance" (Burna Boy)	2014	Non-album	
"Ife" (Pasuma (feat. Tiwa Savage)	2014	"My World"	10 June 2016
"Don Gorgon" (Burna Boy)	2014		
"Shout Out (Remix)" (Banky W. & Tiwa Savage)	2014	"I'm Not Even A Rapper Though"	
"In Case of Incasity" (Dammy Krane (feat. Davido)	2014	The Enterkraner	24 August 2014
"Faleela" (Dammy Krane)	2014	The Enterkraner	24 August 2014
"Love Me" (Olawale (feat. Tiwa Savage)	2014	Almost Famous	27 September 2014
"Jupa" (Olawale)	2014	Almost Famous	27 September 2014
"Key to the City" (Tiwa Savage)	2014	R.E.D	19 December 2015
"Gba Gbe E" (DJ Spinall featuring Burna Boy)	2014	My Story: The Album	28 October 2015
"Keep On Pushing" (2Baba)	2014	Away and Beyond	24 March 2014
"Omo No Dulling" (2Baba featuring Dammy Krane and Rocksteady)	2014	Away and Beyond	24 March 2014
"Mummy Mi" (Wizkid)	2014	Ayo	17 September 2014
"In Love" (Wizkid featuring Seyi Shay)	2014	Ayo	17 September 2014
"Key To The City" (Tiwa Savage featuring Busy Signal)	2015	R.E.D	19 December 2015
"Demo" (Olawale)	2015	Non-album single	
"Lalee Friday" (TeeHigh featuring Dammy Krane)	2015	Non-album single	
"Ijo Ayo" (Remix) (Skales featuring Olamide and Pasuma)	2015	Non-album single	
"Turn It Up" (Iyanya featuring Olamide)	2015	Non-album single	
"Officially Blind" (2Baba)	2015	Non-album single	
"Zero Smello" (TeeHigh featuring Davido)	2015	Non-album single	
"Follow You Go" (Sunkanmi)	2015	Non-album single	
"Joselyn Dumas" (Trafic)	2015	Non-album single	
"Always" (Skales (feat. Davido)	2015	Man of the Year	18 May 2015
"Ijo Ayo" (Skales featuring Olamide)	2015	Man of the Year	18 May 2015
"Wole" (DJ Xclusive featuring Davido)	2015	According to X	29 June 2015
"Alhaji" (DJ Xclusive featuring Tiwa Savage, Reekado Banks and Trafic)	2015	According to X	29 June 2015
"Oyoyo" (DJ Xclusive featuring Burna Boy)	2015	According to X	29 June 2015
"Bounce" (MC Galaxy featuring Zinnia)	2015	Breakthrough	27 April 2015
"Oshe Baba" (MC Galaxy featuring Chris String)	2015	Breakthrough	27 April 2015
"Alhaji" (Maire featuring Iceberg Slim)	2016	Non-album single	
"All Ur Love" (F.A)	2016	Non-album single	
"How Long" (Davido featuring Tinashe)	2016	Son of Mercy	14 October 2016
"Iskaba" (Wande Coal featuring DJ Tunez)	2016	Non-album single	
"Askamaya" (Teni)	2018	Non-album single	
