= The Enterkraner =

Studio album by Dammy Krane
- Released: 21 August 2014
- Genre: Fuji; afro pop
- Length: 58:20
- Label: Hypertek Digital; 960
- Producer: LeriQ; Spellz; Teebeeo; Fliptyce; Dayme

Dammy Krane chronology
The Enterkraner (2014)	A.L.O.N.E. (A Leader of a New Era) (2022)

Singles from The Enterkraner
- 1. "My Dear" Released: 6 April 2012; 2. "Ligali" Released: 10 December 2012; 3. "Gratitude" Released: 6 June 2013; 4. "Sabi Dance" Released: 26 February 2014; 5. "OTID (Our Turnup is Different)" Released: 7 July 2014; 6. "Amin" / "In Case of Incasity" Released: 23 July 2014; 7. "Faleela" Released: 17 September 2014

The Enterkraner is the debut studio album by Nigerian singer Dammy Krane. Released on 21 August 2014 through Hypertek Digital and 960 Music Group, the album features guest appearances from 2Face Idibia, Rocksteady, Davido, Pucado, DJ Consequence, Olamide, Pasuma, and Ice Prince. Production was handled by LeriQ, Spellz, Teebeeo, Fliptyce, and Dayme.

== Background and celebration party ==
Dammy Krane revealed the release of the album a while after his performance at Industry Nite on 23 July 2014. He held a celebration party for The Enterkraner on 20 September 2014 at Rhapsody's in Victoria Island, Lagos. It was organised by Moet and Chandon, and participants included Temi Dollface, Pucado, Papa Omisore, Demilade Roberts, Olisa Adibua, N6, Lynxxx, DJ Zeez, Praiz, LeriQ, Jimmie, IK Ogbonna, Folu Storms, DJ Spinall, DJ Jimmy Jatt, Babatunde J, DJ Sose, Audu Maikori, Tee-Y Mix, Ajebutter22, Ajifa Atuluku, and more.

== Singles ==
The album's lead single "My Dear" was released on 6 April 2012. Produced by Spellz, it served as his first official single when he signed to Hypertek.

The second single off The Enterkraner was released on 10 December 2012, entitled "Ligali". It features Pasuma and was produced by Fliptyce.

The third single off the album "Gratitude" was released on 6 June 2013. Released alongside "Lobatan" and "Xteristics", the song was produced by Spellz.

The Enterkraner's Teebeeo-produced fourth single "Sabi Dance" was officially released on 26 February 2014 alongside its accompanying music video directed by Clarence Peters. It was promoted with a dance challenge with an instructional dance video released on 17 October 2013.

The album's fifth single "OTID (Our Turnup Is Different)" was released on 7 July 2014 and features DJ Consequence and Ice Prince. It was produced by Dayme.

The dual sixth singles "Amin" and "In Case of Incasity" featuring Davido were both released on 23 July 2014. Both produced by Spellz, "In Case of Incasity" is a club track while "Amin" has been described as a " slow tempo" and "prayerful" song.

The seventh and final single "Faleela" was released on 17 September 2014. It was also produced by Spellz.

== Critical reception ==
Tola Sarumi of NotJustOk reviewed Dammy Krane's The Enterkraner as an underwhelming effort, hindered by dated beats, incomplete melodies, and tepid lyrics, despite glimpses of his talent on tracks like "Faleela", "Jolly Good Fellow", and "Amin". Sarumi concluded, "[Dammy Krane] shows glimpses of his talent on this album, but not enough to propel himself to that necessary next level required to attain real pop stardom." It was rated 3.5/10.

Jim Donnett of tooXclusive reviewed Dammy Krane's The Enterkraner as a mixed effort, showcasing his talent for 21st-century Fuji but faltering with shallow lyrics and uneven production. Despite standout tracks like Amin, which he praised as "not just a typical song, it’s a beautiful prayer," the album struggled to fully realize its potential. The album was rated 2.5/5.

Wilfred Okiche of YNaija described The Enterkraner as an average debut album that showcased Dammy Krane's potential but suffered from a lack of precision in songwriting, production, and overall presentation. Okiche noted that while tracks like "Amin" stood out as crowd-pleasers, the album lacked standout hits and struggled to define a strong identity. He concluded, “It is an average, middling debut from an artiste still struggling to find his space in the business. And maybe that is not a bad thing.”

== Track listing ==
The Enterkraner track listing
No.	Title	Writer(s)	Producer(s)	Length
1.	"Industreet (Intro)" (featuring John Black)	Oyindamola Emmanuel		1:53
2.	"Asiwaju"	Emmanuel	LeriQ	4:06
3.	"Clinching" (featuring Pucado)	Emmanuel; Paul Orisakwe	LeriQ	4:12
4.	"Oluwakemi"	Emmanuel	LeriQ	3:39
5.	"Love Na Die" (featuring Olamide)	Emmanuel; Olamide Adedeji	LeriQ	3:30
6.	"Faleela"	Emmanuel	Spellz	3:14
7.	"Jolly Good Fellow" (featuring 2Face Idibia and Rocksteady)	Emmanuel; Innocent Idibia; Ibrahim Oboromboro	Spellz	4:16
8.	"Tomorrow No Dey"	Emmanuel	Spellz	3:47
9.	"In Case of Incasity" (featuring Davido)	Emmanuel; David Adeleke	Spellz	3:33
10.	"Sabi Dance"	Emmanuel	Teebeeo	3:33
11.	"Africa"	Emmanuel	Spellz	5:00
12.	"Amin"	Emmanuel	Spellz	3:37

Bonus tracks
No.	Title	Writer(s)	Producer(s)	Length
13.	"Ligali" (featuring Pasuma)	Emmanuel; Wasiu Otedola	Fliptyce	4:04
14.	"My Dear"	Emmanuel	Spellz	3:27
15.	"OTID" (with DJ Consequence and Ice Prince)	Emmanuel; Akeredolu Pelumi; Panshak Zamani	Dayme	3:17
16.	"Gratitude"	Emmanuel	Spellz	3:12
Total length:				58:20

== Personnel ==
Credits adapted from back cover.

- LeriQ - production
- Spellz — production
- Teebeeo — production
- Fliptyce — production
- Dayme — production
- Foster Zeeno — engineer
- John Black — additional vocals

== Release history ==
Release history and formats for The Enterkraner
Region	Date	Format	Label
Various	21 August 2014	Digital download	Hypertek Digital; 960
Nigeria	2 September 2014	CD	Hypertek Digital; 960
