= Warriors (2Baba album) =

Studio album by 2Baba
- Released: 28 February 2020
- Recorded: 2020
- Genre: Afrobeats; Afropop; reggae
- Length: 45:52
- Label: Hypertek Digital
- Producer: Boliji Beatz; Jay Sleek; Blaq Jerzee; Speroach Beatz; Pbankz; Spellz; Richie; Ploops

2Baba chronology
Rewind, Select, Update (2015)	Warriors (2020)

Singles from Warriors
- 1. "Amaka" Released: 27 June 2018; 2. "Oyi" Released: 1 January 2019; 3. "Important" Released: 15 November 2019; 4. "We Must Groove" Released: 28 February 2020; 5. "Opo" Released: 5 August 2020; 6. "Target You" Released: 5 November 2020

Warriors is the eighth studio album by Nigerian musician 2Baba. The album was released on 28 February 2020 by Hypertek Digital, and features guest appearances from Tiwa Savage, Burna Boy, Wizkid, Peruzzi, Olamide, Syemca and AJ Natives. Production was notably handled by Spellz, Boliji Beatz, Blaq Jerzee, Jay Sleek, Speroach Beatz, Pbankz, Ploops and Richie. The album serves as a follow-up to Rewind, Select, Update (2015).

== Background and singles ==
2Baba revealed the track list for Warriors on 24 February 2020 via Instagram. The album's lead single "Amaka" features Nigerian singer Peruzzi and was produced by Speroach Beatz. The song was released on 27 June 2018 and the music video was directed by Unlimited L.A. The album's second single "Oyi" features 2Baba's brother, Hyacinth Idibia, also known as HI-Idibia. "Oyi" was produced by Ploops and released on 1 January 2019, alongside its music video directed by Unlimited L.A. "Important" was released as the third single off Warriors, and was released on 15 November 2019. "Important" was produced by Jay Sleek and the music video was directed by Clarence Peters. The fourth single off Warriors features Burna Boy and was titled "We Must Groove". It was released on 28 February 2020 and produced by Jay Sleek, and the music video was directed by Patrick Elis. The fifth single, "Opo", features Wizkid and was produced by Blaq Jerzee. The song, alongside its video, was released on 5 August 2020 and directed by Clarence Peters. The sixth single, "Target You" was released on 5 November 2020 and features Syemca. The music video was directed by Unlimited L.A and features Nollywood actress Linda Osifo.

== Track listing ==
Warriors track listing
No.	Title	Writer(s)	Producer(s)	Length
1.	"Warriors"	Innocent Idibia	Boliji Beatz	3:03
2.	"We Must Groove" (featuring Burna Boy)	Idibia; Damini Ogulu; Efe Omorogbe; Idu Charles	Jay Sleek	3:45
3.	"Important"	Idibia; Ogbole Francis	Jay Sleek	3:25
4.	"Carry Dey Go"	Idibia; Omoregbe	Jay Sleek	3:28
5.	"Kitty Kat"	Idibia; Charles; Omoregbe	Jay Sleek	3:37
6.	"Opo" (featuring Wizkid)	Idibia; Ayodeji Balogun; Isaiah Okhuofu; Omoregbe	Blaq Jerzee	3:47
7.	"Amaka" (featuring Peruzzi)	Idibia; Tobechukwu Victor	Speroach Beatz	3:47
8.	"Love Me, Love Me"	Idibia	Pbankz	3:16
9.	"Ginger" (featuring Tiwa Savage)	Idibia; Tiwatope Savage	Spellz	3:25
10.	"Target You" (featuring Syemca)	Idibia; Chukwuemeka Chike	Richie	3:04
11.	"Oyi" (featuring HI-Idibia)	Idibia; Hyacinth Idibia	Ploops	3:57
12.	"I Dey Hear Everything" (featuring Olamide)	Idibia; Olamide Adedeji	Spellz	3:03
13.	"If No Be You" (featuring AJ Natives)	Idibia; Agon John	Boliji Beatz	4:08
Total length:				45:52

== Personnel ==
- Innocent "2Baba" Idibia – vocals, writer
- Damini "Burna Boy" Ogulu – vocals, writer
- Ayodeji "Wizkid" Balogun – vocals, writer
- Tobechukwu "Peruzzi" Okoh – vocals, writer
- Tiwatope "Tiwa" Savage – vocals, writer
- Chukwuemeka "Syemca" Chike-Ezekpeazu – vocals, writer
- Hyacinth "HI" Idibia – vocals, writer
- Olamide Adedeji – vocals, writer
- Agom "AJ Natives" John – vocals, writer
- Okhuofu "Blaq Jerzee" Oshoriameh – producer, writer
- Ben'Jamin "Spellz" Obadje – producer, writer
- Obi "Speroach Beatz" Prosper – producer
- Jerry "Jay Sleek" Shelika – producer
- Pbankz – producer
- Richie – producer
- Bolaji "Bolji Beatz" Salabiu – producer
- Efe Omoregbe – writer
- Idu Charles – writer
- Ogbole Francis – writer

== Release history ==
Release history and formats for Warriors
Region	Date	Format	Label
Nigeria	28 February 2020	Streaming; digital download	Hypertek Digital
