= Rich & Famous (album) =

Studio album by Praiz
- Released: 14 December 2014
- Genre: R&B; pop
- Length: 55:55 (Rich); 45:24 (Famous)
- Label: X3M
- Producer: Steve Babaeko (exec.); Praiz; Wole Oni; Wilson Joel; GospelOnDeBeatz; Cobhams Asuquo; TK; DJ Coublon; Password; Dekumzy; Oscar; DeeVee

Praiz chronology
Rich & Famous (2014)	2 Mins (2018)

Singles from Rich & Famous
- 1. "Rich & Famous" Released: 22 July 2012; 2. "For You" / "I Miss You" Released: 3 February 2013; 3. "Oshe" Released: 6 November 2013; 4. "Sweet Potato" Released: 7 April 2014; 5. "Mercy" Released: 30 April 2014; 6. "Sisi" Released: 14 December 2014

Rich & Famous is the debut studio album by Nigerian singer and record producer Praiz. It was released by X3M Music on 14 December 2014. A double-disc album, it features guest appearances from artists Wizkid, Patoranking, Iyanya, Awilo Longomba, Chidinma, Shaydee, Seyi Shay, Bez, Sound Sultan, Kayswitch, King, Skales, Morell, Iceberg Slim, Wande Baloyi, and Sammy. The album's production was handled by Praiz himself, Wole Oni, Wilson Joel, GospelOnDeBeatz, Cobhams Asuquo, TK, DJ Coublon, Password, Dekumzy, Oscar, and DeeVee. The album was created to showcase Praiz's versatility. Rich & Famous received a nomination for Album of the Year at the 2015 Nigeria Entertainment Awards. It was also nominated for Best R&B/Pop Album and Album of the Year at the Headies 2015.

== Background ==
Praiz revealed the release date to Rich & Famous on 24 November 2014. The album art and track listings for Rich & Famous were revealed two days before the album's release.

== Singles ==
The title track, "Rich & Famous", was released on 22 July 2012 as the album's lead single. Produced by Cobhams Asuquo, the song explores themes of achieving success. It was included on disc 1, Rich. The dual second singles "For You" featuring Seyi Shay and "I Miss You" were released on 3 February 2013. "For You", produced by Dekumzy, is a mid-tempo highlife track while "I Miss You", produced by Wilson Joel, is a low-tempo R&B track. "For You" was included on disc 2, Famous and "I Miss You" was included on Rich. On 6 November 2013, "Oshe" featuring Awilo Longomba was released as Rich & Famous's third single on 6 November 2013. Included on Famous, the Praiz-produced song interpolates Awilo's songs "Karolina", "Gâté le coin", and "J'ai envie de toi". "Sweet Potato", the fourth single, features Chidinma and was released on 7 April 2014. It was produced by Praiz and included on Famous. The fifth single "Mercy" was released on 30 April 2014. It was written and produced by Password. "Sisi" featuring Wizkid was released on 14 December 2014 as the album's sixth and final single. It was produced by GospelOnDeBeatz and was included on Famous. "Sisi" was nominated for Best Collabo at the Headies 2015.

== Critical reception ==
Jim Donnett of tooXclusive said Rich defined Praiz as an R&B singer, saying it played to his vocal strengths and concluding that it showed "the desired trend for a love-themed album." He thought Famous highlighted Praiz's genre exploration, acknowledging its versatility but uneven choices, and summed up the project as "long and exhaustive… simple and sophisticated," rating the album 3 out of 5. In a review for 360nobs, Wilfred Okiche wrote that the Famous disc served as Praiz's pop outlet, calling it "the money maker of the duo" and concluding that "it is a pleasurable pop record" despite excess and uneven moments. He felt the Rich disc played more to Praiz's strengths in R&B, stating that "of the two discs, Rich is the better record" and concluding that "the material on Rich that will ensure that" will ensure Praiz's longevity.

Ayomide Tayo, writing for Pulse Nigeria, observed that the Rich disc centered on Praiz’s soul side, saying it showed his "plush voice," that he was "home singing this genre of music," and concluded it was "lush, emotional and well produced," rating it 4 out of 5. Moreover, Tayo stated that the Famous disc showed Praiz testing pop, adding that he "turns into a full blown pop act," that the album had "signs of shaky feet," but ended that it was "the confident steps of a man in a new terrain," rating it 3.5 out of 5.

=== Accolades ===
Awards and nominations for Rich & Famous
Organization	Year	Category	Result	Ref.
Nigeria Entertainment Awards	2015	Album of the Year	Nominated	
The Headies	2015	Album of the Year	Nominated	
The Headies	2015	Best R&B/Pop Album	Nominated	
tooXclusive Awards	2015	Album of the Year	Nominated	

== Track listing ==
Disc 1 (Rich) track listing
No.	Title	Writer(s)	Producer(s)	Length
1.	"A Woman's Need"	Praise Adejo	Wole Oni	3:57
2.	"I Miss You"	Adejo	Wilson Joel	3:57
3.	"If I Fall"	Adejo	GospelOnDeBeatz	4:48
4.	"Super Hero"	Omolara Ayodele	Cobhams Asuquo	4:29
5.	"Heart Beat"	Adejo; King	GospelOnDeBeatz	4:24
6.	"Show Me the Way" (featuring Wanda Baloyi)	Adejo; Wanda Baloyi	Wilson Joel	3:54
7.	"Addicted"	Adejo	GospelOnDeBeatz	2:52
8.	"Rich & Famous"	Adejo; Ayodele	Cobhams Asuquo	4:42
9.	"Lost in You" (featuring Sammy)	Adejo; Samuel Yakubu	Praiz	4:20
10.	"Losing It"	Adejo	Praiz	4:30
11.	"Can't Let Go"	Adejo	TK	3:39
12.	"Want You" (featuring King)	Adejo; King	Praiz	3:30
13.	"Amazing"	Adejo	Praiz	3:49
14.	"Show Me the Way" (Reprise)	Adejo	Wilson Joel	2:56
Total length:				55:55

Disc 2 (Famous) track listing
No.	Title	Writer(s)	Producer(s)	Length
1.	"Sisi" (featuring Wizkid)	Praise Adejo; Ayodeji Balogun; Esegine Allen	GospelOnDeBeatz	3:49
2.	"Harder" (featuring Patoranking)	Adejo; Patrick Okorie	Praiz	3:13
3.	"Pere" (featuring Iyanya)	Adejo; Iyanya Mbuk	DJ Coublon	3:00
4.	"Mercy"	Patrick Mathias	Password	4:12
5.	"Oshe" (featuring Awilo Longomba)	Adejo; Awilo Longomba	Praiz	3:10
6.	"Sweet Potato" (featuring Chidinma)	Adejo	Praiz	3:54
7.	"I No Use U Play" (featuring Shaydee)	Adejo	TK	4:05
8.	"Afurum Gi Na Anya"	Adejo	Wole Oni	5:01
9.	"For You" (featuring Seyi Shay)	Derek Osonwa	Dekumzy	3:26
10.	"Physical Something" (featuring Bez and Sound Sultan)	Oscar Heman-Ackah	Oscar	4:23
11.	"Delilah" (featuring Kayswitch)	Adejo; Kehinde Oyebanjo; Samuel Yakubu	DeeVee	3:16
12.	"Jalabia and Snapbacks" (featuring King, Skales, Morell, and Iceberg Slim)	Adejo; King; Raoul John Njeng-Njeng; Musa Akilah; Olusegun Olowokere	Praiz	3:49
Total length:				45:24

== Personnel ==
=== Rich ===
- Praiz — songwriting (tracks 1–3, 5–7, 9–11, 13, 14), production (tracks 9, 10, 12, 13)
- Omolara — songwriting (tracks 4, 8)
- King — songwriting (tracks 5, 12)
- Wanda Baloyi — songwriting (track 6)
- Sammy — songwriting (track 9)
- Wole Oni — production (track 1)
- Wilson Joel — production (tracks 2, 6, 14)
- GospelOnDeBeatz — production (tracks 3, 5, 7)
- Cobhams Asuquo — production (tracks 4, 8)
- TK — production (track 11)
- Darock Peter — guitars (track 3)
- Banky Sax — horns (track 3)

=== Famous ===
- Praiz — songwriting (tracks 1–3, 5–8, 11, 12), production (tracks 2, 5, 6, 12)
- Wizkid — songwriting (track 1)
- Orezi — songwriting (track 1)
- Patoranking — songwriting (track 2)
- Iyanya — songwriting (track 3)
- Password — songwriting, production (track 4)
- Awilo Longomba — songwriting (track 5)
- Dekumzy — songwriting, production (track 9)
- Oscar — songwriting, production (track 10)
- Kayswitch — songwriting (track 11)
- Sammy — songwriting (track 11)
- King — songwriting (track 12)
- Skales — songwriting (track 12)
- Morell — songwriting (track 12)
- Iceberg Slim — songwriting (track 12)
- GospelOnDeBeatz — production (track 1)
- DJ Coublon — production (track 3)
- TK — production (track 7)
- Wole Oni — production (track 8)
- Dekumzy — production (track 9)
- Oscar — production (track 10)
- DeeVee — production (track 11)
- Fiokee — horns (track 6)

== Release history ==
Release history and formats for Rich & Famous
Region	Date	Format	Label
Various	14 December 2014	CD; digital download	X3M
