= Amaka (song) =

Single by 2Baba featuring Peruzzi

from the album Warriors
- Released: 27 June 2018
- Genre: Afropop
- Length: 3:47
- Label: Hypertek Digital
- Songwriters: Innocent Ujah Idibia; Tobechukwu Okolie
- Producer: Speroachbeatz

Music video
- "Amaka" on YouTube

"Amaka" is a song by Nigerian singer 2Baba featuring Peruzzi. Released on 27 June 2018 through Hypertek Digital as a stand-alone single, it later appeared on 2Baba's 2020 album Warriors. Produced by Speroachbeatz, the track became one of Nigeria's most popular songs of 2018 and was nominated for Best Collaboration at the 2019 Headies Awards.

== Background and release ==
According to producer Speroachbeatz, the collaboration began when Peruzzi invited him to Larry Gaaga's Lagos studio, where he met 2Baba for the first time. The three artists built the song around a beat Speroachbeatz had created. In later interviews, he expressed confidence that the track would be successful once the recording was complete. The single was released digitally in 2018 through Hypertek Digital.

== Composition and lyrics ==
The track blends Afropop rhythms with lyrics in English, Nigerian Pidgin, and Ibibio. Its storyline follows a man's disappointment after being stood up by a woman named Amaka, with lyrical references to everyday Nigerian experiences such as power outages and social media. According to Pulse Nigeria, the chorus line "Amaka disappoint me" resonated widely with listeners and became a catchphrase for disappointment in Nigerian popular culture.

== Reception ==
Ehis Ohunyon of Pulse Nigeria called it "the best song you will listen to this year," praising its melody and relatable subject matter. Debola Abimbolu of The Native emphasised its cultural resonance, highlighting the way it spoke to contemporary issues of relationships and expectations. Alexander Ndace of BellaNaija rated "Amaka" a 4.5/5, describing the song as "a joy, with an exploration of keys and notes that’s reminiscent of the best of pop music."

At the 2019 Headies Awards, "Amaka" was nominated for Best Collaboration. Daily Trust also included its music video among Nigeria's most popular at the time of release.

== Accolades ==
Year	Award ceremony	Prize	Result	Ref
2018	Soundcity MVP Awards Festival	Best Collaboration	Nominated	
2018	Soundcity MVP Awards Festival	Song of the Year	Nominated	
2018	All Africa Music Awards	Best Artist, Duo or Group in African Pop	Won	
2019	The Headies	Best Collaboration	Nominated	
