= Bigiano =

- Born: Babalola Oluwagbemiga Gabriel; 1 August 1980 (age 45); Lagos State, Nigeria
- Origin: Osun State
- Genres: Afropop; hip hop; Soul; R&B
- Occupations: singer; rapper; songwriter; producer; performer
- Instrument: Vocals
- Years active: 2007– present

Babalola Oluwagbemiga Gabriel (born August 1, 1980) known professionally as Bigiano, is a Nigerian songwriter, singer, record producer, recording artist, and stage performer, Known for his hit single “Shayo"

== Early life and education ==
Babalola Oluwagbemiga Gabriel is the fourth in a family of six, from Osun State, he started his music career as a choirmaster and music coordinator in church.

He studied computer science at the Obafemi Awolowo University.

His passion for the entertainment world lured him into teaming up with other like minds to start a musical group known as Triple B.

In 1999, the group released an official single called "Egba Mi"

== Career ==
In 2009, he was nominated for multiple awards including the MTV Africa Music Awards and Nigeria Entertainment Awards' under the Best New Act category alongside M.I.

In same year, his song “Shayo” won Best Music Video, Best Cinematography and Viewers’ Choice of The Year Awards at the Sound City Music Video Awards.

He also went on to tour the South African territories.

In 2012, Bigiano featured fellow Nigerian artiste Wizkid on his single “Chillings”. He has also featured other household names like Innocent "Tuface" Idibia

In October 2022, he released an Amapiano refix of his original hit single Shayo alongiside Jaybreeze.

== Discography ==
=== Albums ===
- Shayo master – 2008

=== Singles ===
- "It's Over" feat. General Pype
- "Chillings" feat. Wizkid
- "As E Dey Hot"
- "One & Only"
- "Ibile"
- "Tonight"
- "Chiquito"
- "I Be Somebody"
- "BFF"
- "Norty"
- "Who's That Girl"
- "Go Crazy"

== Awards and nominations ==
Year	Event	Prize	Recipient	Result	Ref(s)
2009	Soundcity Music Video Awards	Best Video of the Year	”Himself”	Won	
2009	Soundcity Music Video Awards	Viewers’ Choice	”Himself”	Won	
2009	Soundcity Music Video Awards	Best Cinematography	”Himself”	Won	
2009	MTV Africa Music Awards 2009	Best New Act	”Himself”	Nominated	
2009	2009 Nigeria Entertainment Awards	Best New Act	”Himself”	Nominated	
