= FBE =

FBE may refer to:

- European Banking Federation
- First Bulgarian Empire
- Francisco Beltrão Airport, in Brazil
- Full blood exam
- Full Blown Entertainment, a music production company
- Fusion bonded epoxy coating
- UNSW Faculty of Built Environment, of the University of New South Wales
- Fine Brothers Entertainment
- Fleet Base East, a Royal Australian Navy major fleet base clustered around Sydney Harbour
- File-based encryption, form of disk encryption in computing
