= The Headies Award for Best R&B/Pop Album =

Nigerian music industry award

- Awarded for: Best R&B/pop album in the year under review (by single individual or group).
- Country: Nigeria
- Presented by: Hip Hop World Magazine
- First award: 2006
- Final award: 2019
- Website: theheadies.com

The Headies Award for Best R&B/Pop Album is an award presented at The Headies, a ceremony that was established in 2006 and originally called the Hip Hop World Awards. (Note: The nominees for the 2006 edition are not included in the Recipients table because they are not available.) It was first awarded to P-Square's Get Squared in 2006.

== Recipients ==
Best R&B/Pop Album
Year	Nominees	Result	Ref
2019	The Mayor of Lagos by Mayorkun	Won	
2019	rare. by Odunsi (The Engine)	Nominated	
2019	Outside by Burna Boy	Nominated	
2019	No Bad Songz by Kizz Daniel	Nominated	
2019	About 30 by Adekunle Gold	Nominated	
2018	Sounds from the Other Side by Wizkid	Won	
2018	Timeless by Omawumi	Nominated	
2018	Simisola by Simi	Nominated	
2018	Gold by Adekunle Gold	Nominated	
2018	Ijele the Traveler by Flavour	Nominated	
2018	This is Me by Niniola	Nominated	
2016	New Era by Kizz Daniel	Won	
2016	Wanted by Wande Coal	Nominated	
2016	Klĭtôrĭs by Brymo	Nominated	
2016	Naked by Darey	Nominated	
2016	Seyi or Shay by Seyi Shay	Nominated	
2015	Ayo by Wizkid	Won	
2015	Bed of Stone by Aṣa	Nominated	
2015	King of Queens by Yemi Alade	Nominated	
2015	Rich & Famous by Praiz	Nominated	
2015	Double Trouble by P-Square	Nominated	
2014	The Journey by Sean Tizzle	Won	
2014	Take Over by Kcee	Nominated	
2014	Once Upon a Time by Tiwa Savage	Nominated	
2014	Me, My Mouth & Eye by Sound Sultan	Nominated	
2014	L.I.F.E by Burna Boy	Nominated	
2013	Omo Baba Olowo by Davido	Won	
2013	Desire by Iyanya	Nominated	
2013	R&BW by Banky W.	Nominated	
2013	Blessed by Flavour	Nominated	
2013	Away & Beyond by 2Face Idibia	Nominated	
2012	The Invasion by P-Square	Won	
2012	Superstar by Wizkid	Nominated	
2012	Super Sun by Bez	Nominated	
2012	Versus by 9ice	Nominated	
2011	The Unstoppable International Edition by 2Face Idibia	Won	
2011	Turning Point by Dr Sid	Nominated	
2011	Beautiful Imperfection by Aṣa	Nominated	
2011	Back From the Future by Sound Sultan	Nominated	
2011	Double Dare by Darey	Nominated	
2010	Mushin 2 Mo' Hits by Wande Coal	Won	
2010	Danger by P-Square	Nominated	
2010	Least Expected by Bracket	Nominated	
2010	Un.darey.ted by Darey	Nominated	
2009	Gongo Aso by 9ice	Won	
2009	The Entertainer by D'banj	Nominated	
2009	The Unstoppable by 2Face Idibia	Nominated	
2009	Etcetera by Etcetera	Nominated	
2009	Mr. Capable by Banky W.	Nominated	
2008	Grass 2 Grace by 2Face Idibia	Won	
2008	Independent by Faze	Nominated	
2008	Call My Name by Niyola	Nominated	
2008	Press On Part 2 by Indispensables	Nominated	
2008	Game Over by P-Square	Nominated	
2006	Get Squared by P-Square	Won	

== Category records ==
Most wins

Rank	1st	2nd	3rd
Artist	2Face Idibia; Wizkid; Kizz Daniel; P-Square	Wande Coal; Davido	9ice Sean Tizzle; Weird MC
Total wins	2 wins	1 win	1 win

Most nominations

Rank	1st	2nd	3rd
Artist	Wizkid	2Face Idibia; Darey; Kizz Daniel; P-Square	Flavour; Burna Boy; Simi; Adekunle Gold
Total noms	4 nominations	3 nominations	2 nominations
