= The Ascension (2Face Idibia album) =

Studio album by 2face Idibia
- Released: July 21, 2014
- Recorded: 2013–2014
- Genres: Afropop; R&B; soca; zouk; highlife
- Length: 65:00
- Labels: Hypertek Digital; 960 Music Group
- Producers: Leriq; Alton Berti; Bolji Beats; Dezay; Dnyce; Fabio Litto; Femdouble; GSol the Producer; Jay Sleek; Kodjo; Masterkraft; Rolly

2face Idibia chronology
Away and Beyond (2012)	The Ascension (2014)	Rewind, Select, Update (2015)

Singles from The Ascension
- 1. "Ife Dinma" Released: November 6, 2013; 2. "Let Somebody Love You" Released: May 26, 2014; 3. "Go" Released: June 26, 2014; 4. "Diaspora Woman" Released: October 23, 2014

The Ascension is the sixth studio album by Nigerian singer 2face Idibia. It was released on July 21, 2014, by Hypertek Digital and 960 Music Group. The album features collaborations with Machel Montano, Vector, Bridget Kelly, Sir Victor Uwaifo, Shurwayne Winchester and Fally Ipupa, among others. It was produced by Leriq, Alton Berti, Bolji Beats, Dezay, Dnyce, Fabio Litto, Femdouble, GSol the Producer, Jay Sleek, Kodjo, Masterkraft and Rolly. 2face became the first Nigerian to appear on the Billboard World Albums chart when The Ascension debuted at number 12. Music critics gave the album largely varying reviews.

The Ascension yielded the singles "Ife Dinma", "Let Somebody Love You", "Go", and "Diaspora Woman". 960 Music Group put up outdoor billboards in ten of Lagos' most populous neighborhoods to promote the record.

== Background and promotion ==
2face began recording the album in 2013. In a press release, 960 Music Group said the album would be released on July 21, 2014. The Ascension was eventually released in two versions: economy and premium. The premium version, which includes a 16-page insert, is available exclusively at Konga.com; the economy version is available for digital download on Spinlet, iTunes and Spotify. The album's cover art was conceptualized and designed by Janne Kukka and Mole "Tobbie" Balogun. All of the tracks on the album were included in a 30-second clip that 2face released on July 9, 2014. On July 19, he held the album's launch party at Escape in Victoria Island, Lagos. Guests in attendance included Olamide, Tiwa Savage, and Jermaine Jackson, among others. MTV Base, in conjunction with Industry Nite, hosted another launch party on July 23, 2014.

The Masterkraft-produced track "Ife Dinma" was released on November 6, 2013, as the album's lead single. It was initially released as a Tony Oneweek single, but surprisingly made the album. The accompanying music video for "Ife Dinma" was directed by Clarence Peters. The album's second single, "Let Somebody Love You", was released on May 26, 2014. The song was produced by Femi Femdouble and features vocals by Bridget Kelly. Its music video was filmed in Lagos by Luke Biggins. In April 2014, 2face and Bridget Kelly performed the song during Star Music Trek's visit to Markudi. The album's third single "Go", which features vocals by Trinidadian singer Machel Montano, was released on June 26, 2014. Both artists performed the song at the 18th annual St. Kitts Music Festival, which occurred in June 2014. The music video for "Go" was released by 960 Music on December 5, 2014, and features cameo appearances from Seyi Shay and Niyola.

The album's fourth single, "Diaspora Woman", was released on October 23, 2014. Its music video was filmed in Dallas by Moe Musa. Ghanaian actress Juliet Ibrahim played 2face's love interest in the video.

== Composition ==
The Ascension is primarily an R&B and Afropop album, but explores other musical styles such as soca, zouk and highlife. The album is composed of fast and slow tempo songs. 2face dedicated the electro house record "#Aproko" to social media critics. In "Jeje", he samples African China's "Mr. President" and pays homage to afrobeat of the 1970s. The tracks "International Loving" and "Diaspora Woman" have elements of zouk. Soca rhythms are evident on "Boulay Boulay" and "Go". The slow tempo ballad "Hate What You Do To Me" has a sensitive theme. "Kiss of Life" is also a slow tempo ballad with soft lyrics.

== Critical reception ==
Professional ratings
Review scores
Source	Rating
The NET	3/5 stars

The Ascension received generally mixed reviews from music critics. Chiagoziem Onyekwena of The NET awarded the album 3 stars out of 5, saying it "isn't bad in itself, just not the genre-bending, boundary-crossing, revolutionary album it had the potential to be". Lobatan's Brandon Bridges commended the album's songwriting, diverse sounds, instrumentation, and energetic appeal.

== Track listing ==
No.	Title	Writer(s)	Producer(s)	Length
1.	"Go" (featuring Machel Montano)	Innocent Idibia; Machel Montano; Kitwana Israel; Kevon Hart; Winnie Kigara; Leighton Paul; Kasey Phillips	Precision Productions	3:31
2.	"#Aproko"	Idibia; Eric Utere	LeriQ	3:25
3.	"Holiday"	Idibia; Femi Ojetunde; Olubunmi Afolabi	Femdouble; GSol the Producer	3:56
4.	"Can't Hear You" (featuring Vector)	Idibia; Olanrewaju Ogunmefun; Ojetunde; Afolabi	GSol the Producer	3:43
5.	"The Best I Can Be" (featuring Iceberg Slim and Rocksteady)	Idibia; Olusegun Olowokere; Oboromboro; Jerry Shelika	Jay Sleek	5:28
6.	"Let Somebody Love You" (featuring Bridget Kelly)	Idibia; Bridget Kelly; Ojetunde; Afolabi	Femdouble; GSol the Producer	4:11
7.	"Kiss of Life"	Idibia; Ojetunde; Afolabi; Augustine Ahmedu; Kelly; Efe Omoregbe	Femdouble; GSol the Producer	3:45
8.	"Hate What You Do to Me"	Idibia; Ojetunde; Afolabi	Femdouble; GSol the Producer	3:54
9.	"Confessions" (featuring Rocksteady and Dammy Krane)	Idibia; Oboromboro; Oyindamola Emmanuel; Utere	LeriQ	4:33
10.	"Close to Where You Are"	Idibia; Ojetunde; Afolabi	Femdouble; GSol the Producer	3:41
11.	"International Loving" (featuring Kim Almarcha)	Idibia; Kim Almarcha; Fabio Lancel; Franck Kpanku	Fabio Lancel; Kodjo	4:02
12.	"Boulay Boulay" (featuring Shurwayne Winchester)	Idibia; Shurwayne Winchester; Alton Berti	Alton Berti	3:13
13.	"Diaspora Woman" (featuring Fally Ipupa)	Idibia; Fally Ipupa	Dezay	2:23
14.	"Jeje"	Idibia	Boliji Beatz	4:15
15.	"Lesse Passe" (featuring Sir Victor Uwaifo)	Idibia; Sir Victor Uwaifo	Sir Victor Uwaifo	3:58
16.	"Ife Dinma" (with Tony Oneweek)	Idibia; Tony Oneweek	Masterkraft	4:46
17.	"Not a Surprise"	Idibia	Dnyce	2:40
Total length:				65:00

Sampling credits

- "Jeje" samples African China's "Mr. President"

== Personnel ==
Credits adapted from liner notes of The Ascension.

- Innocent Idibia – primary artist, writer, performer
- Efe Omorogbe – A&R, executive producer
- Eric Idiahi – executive producer
- Mark Redguard – co-executive producer
- Machel Montano – featured artist, writer
- Olanrewaju Ogunmefun – featured artist, writer
- Bridget Kelly – featured artist, writer
- Rocksteady – featured artist, writer
- Oyindamola Emmanuel – featured artist, writer
- Sir Victor Uwaifo – featured artist, writer
- Iceberg Slim – featured artist, writer
- Kim Almarcha – featured artist, writer
- Shurwayne Winchester – featured artist, writer
- Fally Ipupa – featured artist, writer
- Femi "Femdouble" Ojetunde – producer, engineer
- Olubunmi "GSol the Producer" Afolabi – producer, engineer
- Precision Productions and Advokit Productions – producer, engineer
- Leriq – producer, engineer
- Jay Sleek – producer
- Masterkraft – producer
- Rolly – producer
- Bolaji "Bolji Beats" Salabiu – producer, engineer
- Dnyce – producer, engineer
- Alton Berti – producer, engineer
- Fabio Lancel – producer
- Franck "Kodjo" Kpanku – producer
- Michael "Dezay" Badibanji – producer
- Foster Zeeno – engineer
- Willie "O" Oputa Chukwuemeka – engineer, production coordination
- Jeremie Tuil – engineer
- Pieter Wagner – engineer
- Janne Kukka – cover art
- TCD Photography – photography
- Rhiemen Phenom Omorogbe – production coordination
- Francis J Ogbole – production coordination
- Bayo Omisore – production coordination
- 960 Music Group – PR Support
- Buzz Warehaus – PR Support
- Felicia Alston – PR Support
- Now Muzik Entertainment – management
- Obaino Music – distribution
- YSG Hubs – distribution
- Konga.com – distribution
- Spinlet – distribution

== Charts ==
Chart performance for The Ascension
Chart (2014)	Peak position
US World Albums (Billboard)	12

== Release history ==
Region	Date	Version	Format	Label
Various	July 21, 2014	Standard	CD; digital download	Sony Music Entertainment Africa; Hypertek Digital; 960 Music Group
