= Full Blown Entertainment =

Music production and songwriting company

- Born: Kory Hart and Kevon Hart; Trinidad and Tobago
- Genres: R&B; Hip Hop Soul; Dance-Pop; Europop; Dancehall; Afrobeat; Soca music
- Occupations: Songwriter; record producer
- Years active: 2004–present
- Label: N/A

Full Blown Entertainment (FBE) is a music production and songwriting company based in the Caribbean twin-island of Trinidad and Tobago. They have written the notable songs The Greatest Bend Over (Take It Easy) Respectfully Yours and most recently No Stress

== History ==
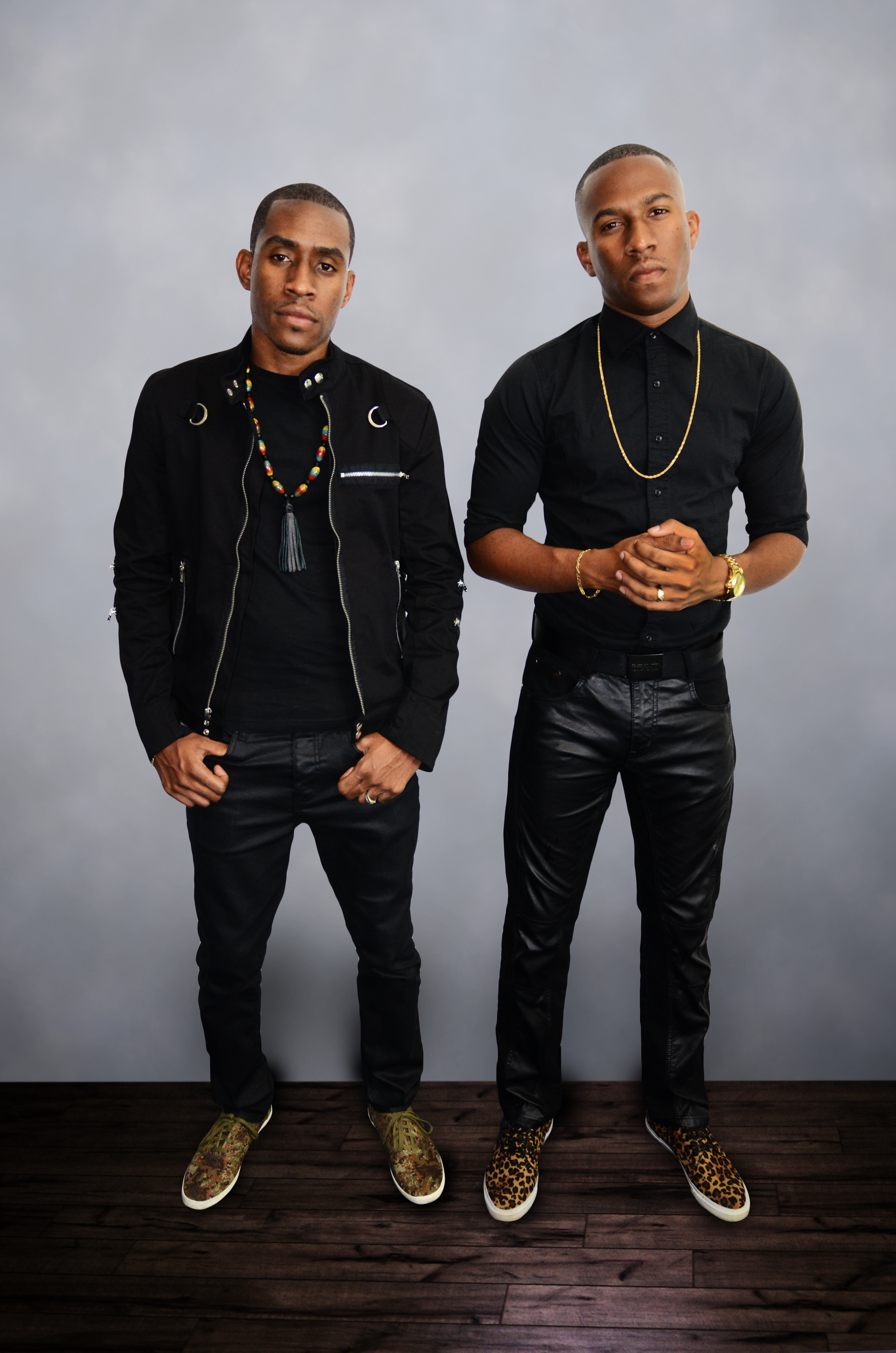
Kevon and Kory

Having no formal musical training, Kevon and Kory Hart were introduced to the process of composing music digitally in 2004 through a former schoolmate. In the years to follow, the duo wrote their songs in R&B, EDM and Soca music.

It would be after approximately six years that, in 2011, the company forced its first door open. In one studio session while recording a song for a wedding, they were noticed by Kasey Phillips of Precision Productions. After the recording was done, Phillips approached the duo and inquired whether they would be willing to write Soca music for the upcoming Carnival celebrations. After initially turning down the offer, they accepted a compact disc with some instrumentals composed by Precision Productions. Coming out of this was the very first song they shopped: Machel Montano's "Vibes Cyah Done". Stemming from this, Machel requested a meeting with Full Blown.

== Songwriting and production careers ==
=== 2012: Career beginnings ===
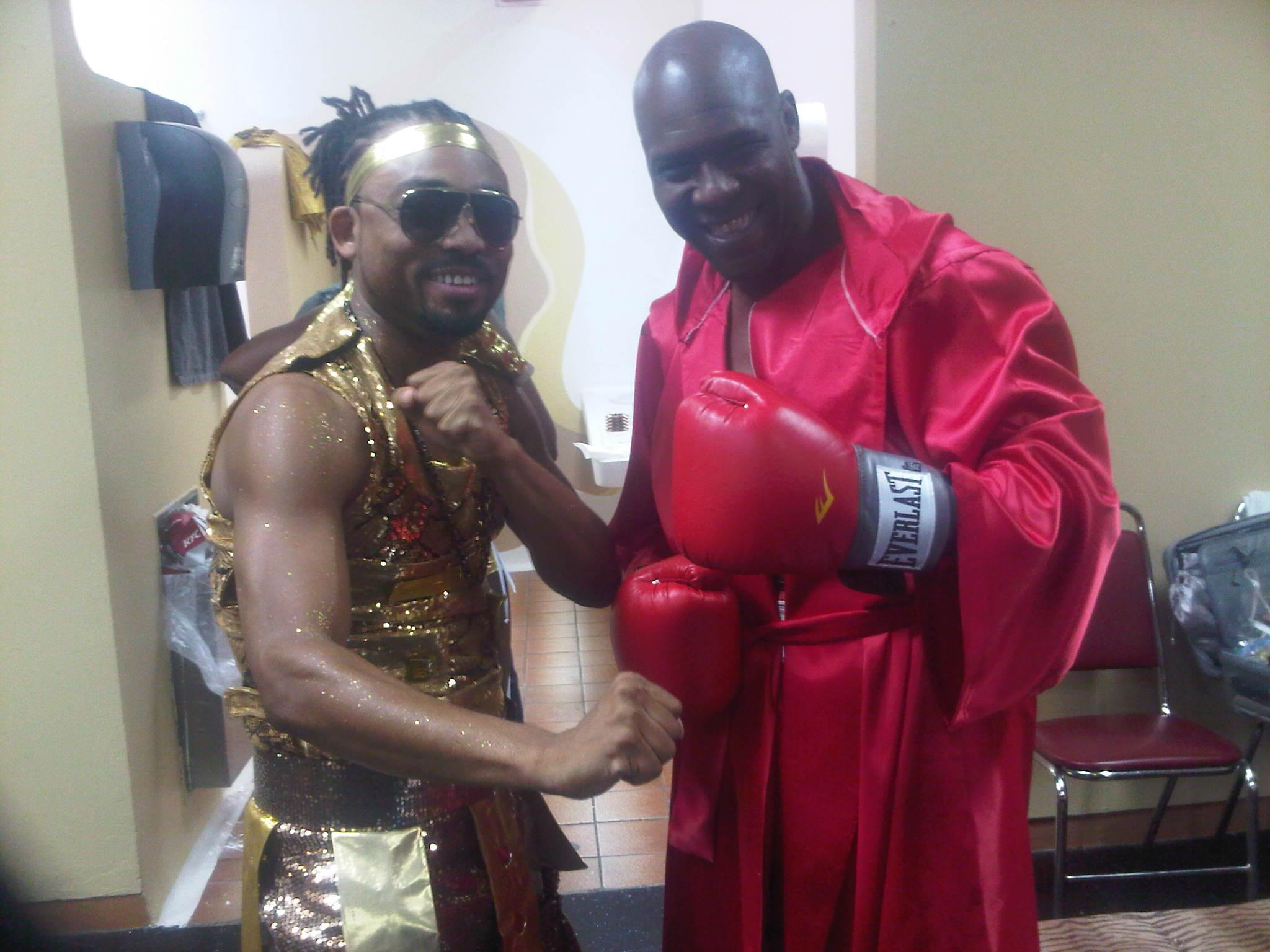
Machel Montano and Benjai

In 2012, two of their songs eventually placed 1st and 3rd in the International Groovy Soca Monarch Competition; Machel Montano's "Mr. Fete" and Benjai's People's "Champion" respectively. The Mr. Fete final performance was the brainchild of both Arvinder Rampersad and legendary artist and "mas-man" Peter Minshall. This would be Machel's very first Groovy Soca Monarch title.

Machel Montano's Vibes Cyah Done and Mr. Fete songs were both released as singles under the umbrella of record company Universal Music, France. Vibes Cyah Done was released and featured Guadeloupe artiste and labelmate Admiral T while Mr. Fete remix was released featuring another Guadeloupe artiste and labelmate Matt Houston and Kulu G.

=== 2013: Sophomore year ===
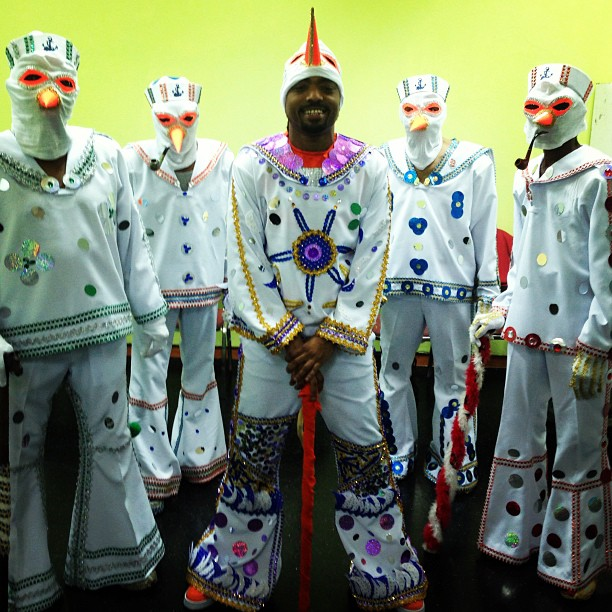
Preparing to hit the stage

In 2013, for a second year in a row, they won the International Groovy Soca Monarch Competition title with Machel Montano's song entitled "FOG". The finals performance was also choreographed by FBE and Machel Montano.

=== 2014–2015 ===
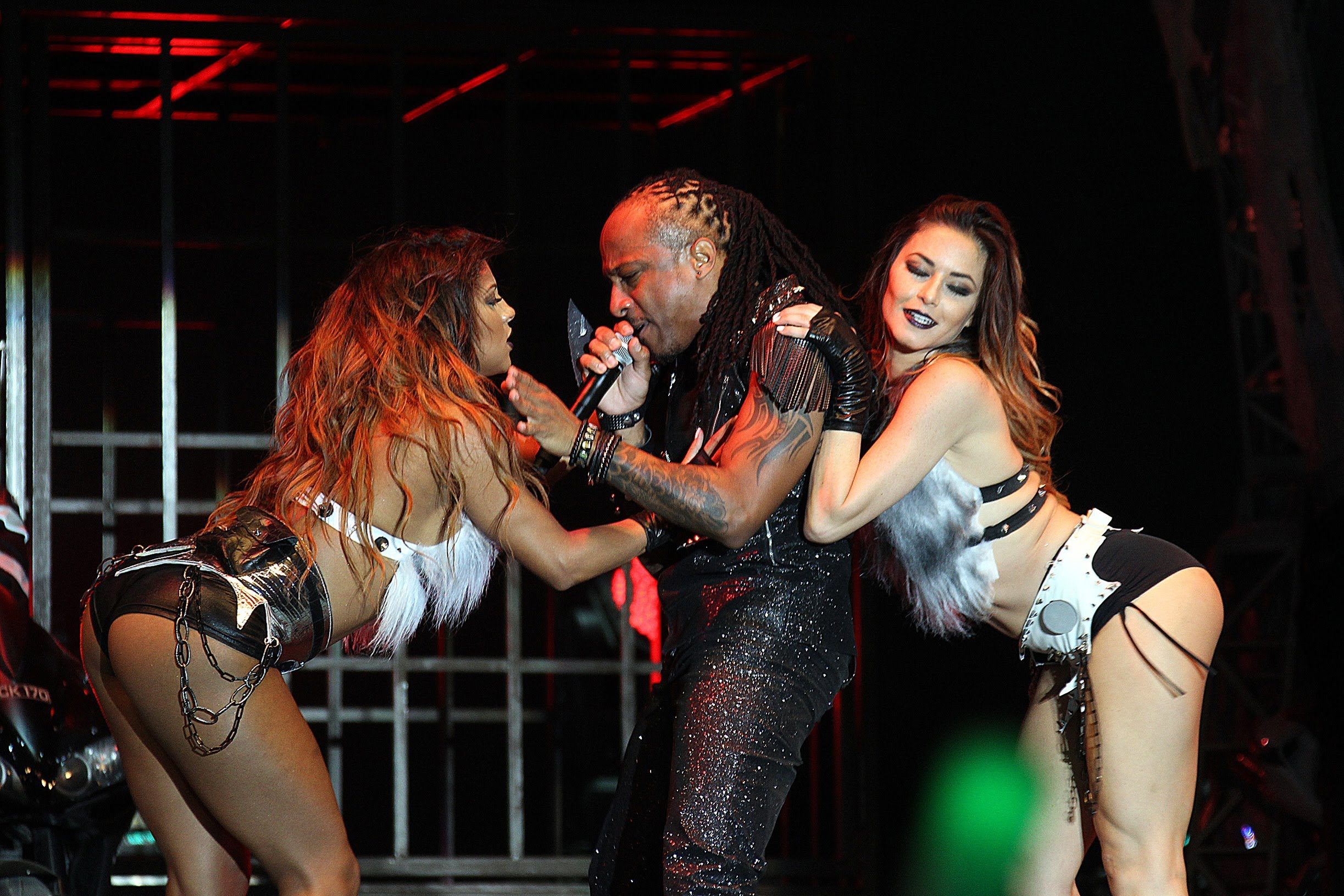
Kerwin DuBois' winning performance

Full Blown Entertainment won the International Soca Monarch title in the Groovy category. The FBE has new members: Aaron St. Louis, who was also a co-writer of "Too Real". Kerwin DuBois entered the competition as the underdog and eventually dethroned the "King of Soca" Machel Montano. Du Bois had previously won it in 2011 as a songwriter and producer for the winning song entitled "Wotless", which was performed by Kees Dieffenthaller. Assisted by the choreography of Step Up Revolution's Jamaal Sims, the performance won.

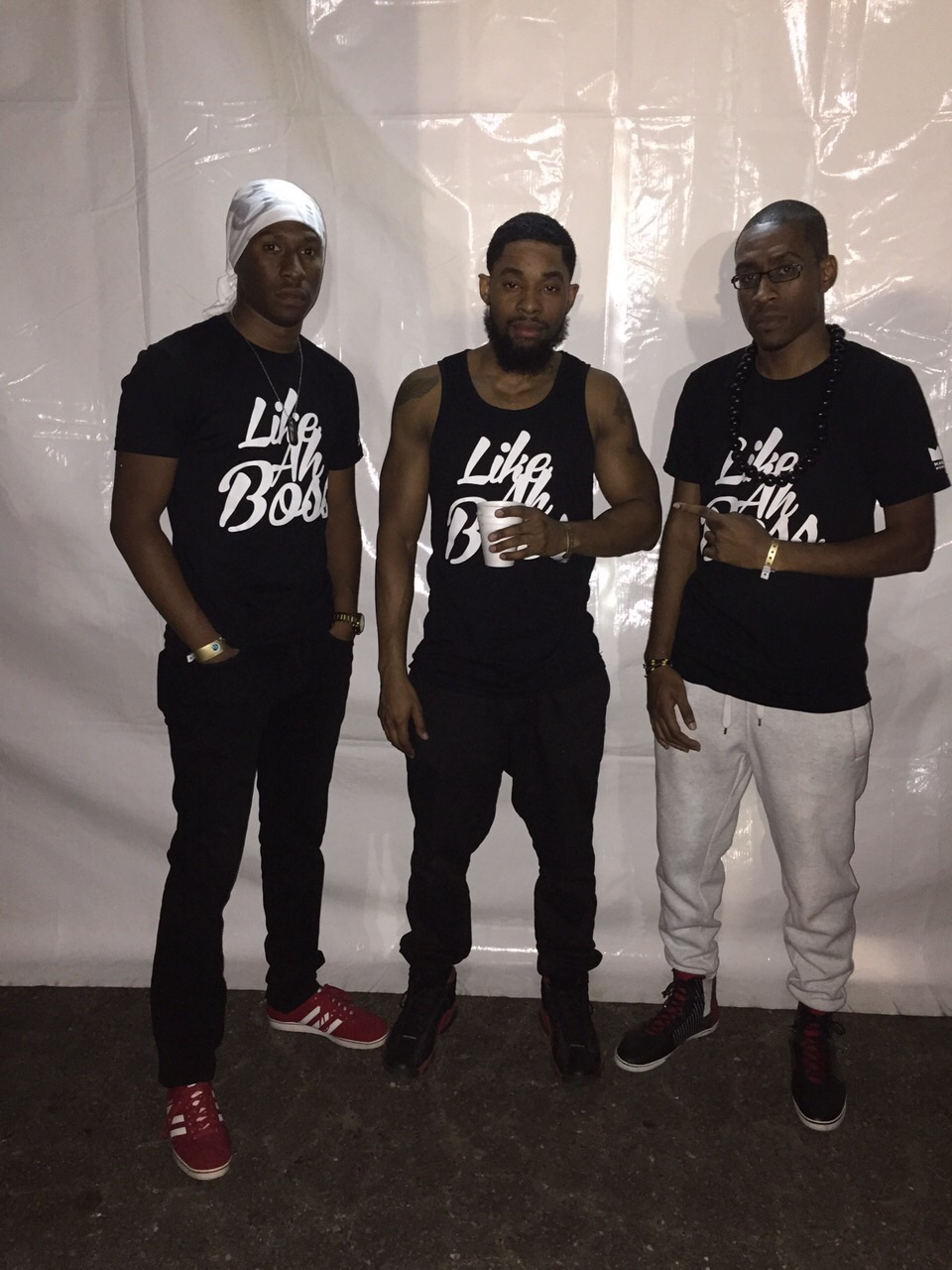
Roc Nation's 'Deputy' with FBE

FBE teamed up with Roc Nation's star producer Deputy as well as Machel Montano and London Future. The brass-driven composition is their fourth title-winning song, capturing the 2015 International Power Soca Monarch title as well as the 2015 Road March title for the song most played during the Carnival parade.

=== 2015–present: Carnival ===
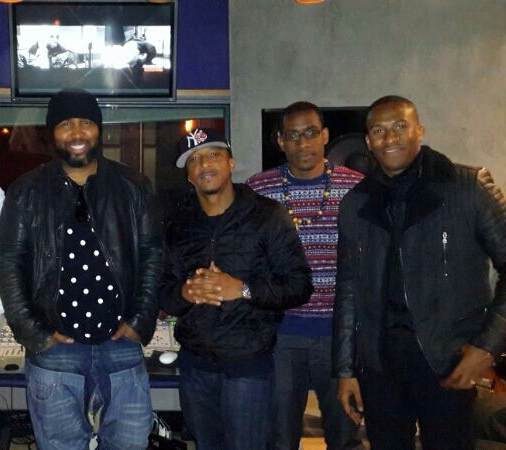
FBE, Kerwin DuBois and Claude Kelly

Currently, FBE is engaged in a number of projects outside of the Soca genre. After their songwriting and production for the likes of Boyz II Men, they worked with songwriter and musician Claude Kelly. They also wrote for Nigerian vocalist 2face Idibia with his recently released single entitled "Go", featuring Machel Montano on his latest album, The Ascension.

FBE composed music for the 2016 Trinidad Carnival with selected artistes such as Kes The Band, Machel Montano, Kerwin DuBois and Lyrikal.

== Discography ==
Year	Song	Artiste
2012	Alien	Voice
2012	Vibes Cyah Done (Antilles Riddim)	Machel Montano
2012	Vibes Cyah Done Remix	Machel Montano feat. Admiral T
2012	In Charge (Maserati Riddim)	Machel Montano
2012	Mr. Fete	Machel Montano
2012	Mr. Fete Remix	Machel Montano feat. Matt Houston and Kulu G
2012	Time For Work (Birdz Riddim)	Machel Montano
2012	Bottle of Rum (3Zero Riddim)	Machel Montano
2012	People's Champion (3Zero Riddim)	Benjai
2012	Drinks (Remix)	Lil' Jon & LMFAO feat. Machel Montano
2012	Power of the Cocktail Remix	Mohombi feat. Machel Montano
2012	Single Forever Remix	KI Persad feat. Machel Montano
2012	Go Down (Loudspeaker Riddim)	Machel Montano
2012	Champion	Machel Montano feat. Beenie Man
2012	Lighting The Way	Machel Montano feat. Pitbull
2012	Fired Up	Machel Montano feat. Chaka Khan
2013	Come Fi D Wuk	Voice feat. Machel Montano
2013	Get Thru	Voice
2013	Drinkin' Rum (Paradise Riddim)	Machel Montano
2013	FOG	Machel Montano
2013	Don't Stop This Party Remix	Pitbull feat. Machel Montano
2014	EPIC	Machel Montano
2014	Junction	Machel Montano
2014	Shake Yuh Bum Bum Remix	Timaya feat. Machel Montano
2014	She Coming (Titans Riddim)	Machel Montano
2014	Too Real	Kerwin Dubois
2014	Can't Let Go	Boyz II Men feat. Machel Montano
2014	Go	2face Idibia feat. Machel Montano
2014	Jus' Wanna Jam	Kes The Band
2014	Million	Kes The Band
2014	Fallin'	Kes The Band
2014	Like Ah Boss	Machel Montano
2014	Love Up	Kerwin DuBois
2014	Ridiculous	Kerwin DuBois
2014	Overdoing It	Ravi B & Kerwin DuBois
2014	The Master	Voice
2015	Need It	Machel Montano
2015	People	Kes The Band
2015	Body Talk	Kes The Band
2015	Unlimited Vibes	Kes The Band feat. Lyrikal
2015	Carnival is Here	Kes The Band
2015	We Big	Ravi B
2015	Find It	Blaxx
2015	Vision	Voice
2015	Cheers to Life	Voice
2015	Unforgettable	Kerwin DuBois feat. Patrice Roberts
