= 2009 Nigeria Entertainment Awards =

- Date: 9 June 2009
- Location: Howard University Cramton Auditorium in Washington, D.C., United States
- Hosted by: Omoni Oboli & Ebbe Bassey

Highlights
- Most awards: M.I (2)
- Most nominations: M.I (3)
- Website: www.nigeriaentawards.com.

The 2009 Nigeria Entertainment Awards was held at Howard University Cramton Auditorium on June 9, 2009. It was hosted by Omoni Oboli and Ebbe Bassey.

== Winners and nominees ==
Listed below are the nominees and winners. Winners are listed first in bold.

Best Album of the Year	Hottest Single of the Year
**The Entertainer – D'banj**; You Know My "P" — Naeto C; The Unstoppable — 2Face Idibia; Undareyted – Darey; Talk About It — M.I	"**Good or Bad" – J. Martins (featuring Timaya and P-Square)**; "Big Boy" – eLDee (featuring Olu Maintain, Oladele and Banky W.); "Shayo" – Durella; "Bumper 2 Bumper" – Wande Coal; "Efimile" – YQ (featuring Dagrin)
Best New Act of the Year	Gospel Artist of the Year
**M.I Abaga**; Durella; YQ; J. Martins; Bigiano	**Midnight Crew**; Nikki Laoye; Rooftop MCs; Lara George; Yinka Ayefele
Music Producer of the Year	Best Rapper
**ID Cabasa**; eLDee; Jay Sleek; Cobhams Asuquo; Don Jazzy	**M.I**; Mode 9; Naeto C; Ikechukwu; Sauce Kid
Best Music Video of the Year	Best International Artist
**"Not the Girl" – Darey**; "Kini Big Deal" – Naeto C (featuring Ikechukwu); "Suddenly" – D'banj; "Good or Bad" – J. Martins (featuring Timaya and P-Square); "Bosi Gbangba" – eLDee	**Iceberg Slim**; Banky W.; Naira; Aṣa; Kelly Hansome
Best International Promoter of the Year	Event of the Year
**Dapo Kush**; Tunes; Kid Konnect; Keno; Dognotime	**This Day/Arise NY Fash Week (US)**; Sisi Ologe (Lagos); Nigerian Reunion (US); Rhythm Unplugged; Miss Nigeria USA
Best World DJ	Best Comedian
**DJ Neptune**; DJ X Chris; DJ Snoop Da Damaga; DJ Sose; DJ Mighty Mike	**I Go Dye**; Klint da Drunk; Tee A; Ayo Makun; Jedi
Best Actor	Best Actress
**Jim Iyke**; Desmond Elliot; Saheed Balogun; Ramsey Nouah; Mike Ezuruonye	**Funke Akindele**; Mercy Johnson; Omotola Jalade; Rita Dominic; Genevieve Nnaji
Indigenous Artiste of the Year
**Yinka Ayefele**; Pasuma; Toba Gold; Dagrin; 9ice
