= Away and Beyond =

Away & Beyond

Studio album by 2Face Idibia
- Released: 30 April 2012
- Recorded: 2011–2012
- Genre: Afrobeats; reggae; dancehall; hip-hop; soul
- Length: 58:43
- Label: Hypertek
- Producer: Femdouble; G. Sol the Producer; Jay Sleek; Kiki Banson; Spellz; Kaywa; Clutchie; DJ Willie O

2Face Idibia chronology
The Unstoppable International Edition (2010)	Away & Beyond (2012)	The Ascension (2014)

Singles from Away and Beyond
- 1. "Chemical Reaction" Released: 18 September 2011; 2. "Bad Man, Bad Girl" Released: 28 February 2012; 3. "Rainbow" Released: 4 April 2012

Away & Beyond is the fifth solo studio album by Nigerian singer 2Face Idibia. It was released on 30 April 2012 by Hypertek Entertainment. The album features guest appearances from Naeto C, Dammy Krane, Terry tha Rapman, Huma Lara, Becca and Rocksteady. Producers that worked on the album include Femdouble, G.$ol, Jay Sleek, Clutchie, DJ Willie O, Kaywa, Spellz and Kiki Banson. Away & Beyond follows up to The Unstoppable International Edition (2010).

== Launch party ==
The release of Away & Beyond was marked by a launch event at the Eko Hotel and Suites in Lagos, during the 2012 Buckwyld 'n' Breathless concert. Held on 30 April 2012, it featured performances from Vector, M.I, Kas, D'banj, Sound Sultan, W4, Sir Shina Peters, and more. Additionally, 2Face Idibia's old group Plantashun Boiz reunited for the ceremony. During a performance of "African Queen", 2Face publicly pledged his love to then-fiancée Annie Macaulay, earning a standing ovation from the audience, which included his mother, Annie’s mother, and Senator Florence Ita Giwa.

== Singles ==
The lead single "Chemical Reaction" featuring Naeto C was released on 18 September 2011. Produced by DJ Willie O, it was included on the NOW Muzik compilation album Love Drunk: Elite Vocalist Lounge Vol. 1. "Bad Man, Bad Girl", the album's second single, is a collaboration with Ghanaian singer Becca and was co-produced by Kiki Banson and Kaywa. Released on 28 February 2012, the song was also included on Becca's second studio album Time 4 Me (2013).

The third single "Rainbow" was released on 4 April 2012. The song was produced by Femdouble and G.$ol the Producer. Its music video features footage of Idibia's traditional white wedding with Annie Macaulay. Hypertek Entertainment released the Clarence Peters-directed video for "Ihe Neme" was released on 25 September 2012 and features a cameo from Nigerian singer W4. At the 2012 Nigerian Music Video Awards, it won Best Visual Effects and was nominated for Best Contemporary Afro. At The Headies 2013, the song won Best Pop Single. "Ihe Neme" was nominated for Best Popular Song of the Year at the 2013 City People Entertainment Awards and Most Gifted Afro Pop Video at the 2013 Channel O Music Video Awards.

The Godfather Productions-directed music video for "Dance Floor" was released on 17 February 2013. The song spawned a remix with Ghanaian rapper Sarkodie and Angolan musician Cabo Snoop, released in April 2013 and included on Away & Beyond Plus (2014), the deluxe edition of Away & Beyond. On 16 May 2013, 2Face Idibia released the music video for "Omo No Dulling", featuring then-labelmates Rocksteady and Dammy Krane. The music video was directed by Sesan.

The official remix to "Rainbow" featuring American singer T-Pain dropped on 28 May 2013 and was included on Away & Beyond Plus. "Rainbow (Remix)" won Most Gifted R&B Music Video of the Year at the 2014 Channel O Music Video Awards and Best International Collaboration at the Ben TV Awards 2014. Furthermore, it received a nomination for Best Collabo at the 2014 African Muzik Magazine Awards. 2Face released the video for "Dance in the Rain" on 27 March 2014. It was directed by Luke Biggins. The animated music video for "Higher (Spiritual Healing)" was released on 4 April 2014. It was directed by Clarence Peters and contains a "weird intergalactic storyline". Ifunanya Mokwuah, writing for 360nobs, framed the "Spiritual Healing" video as a deliberate break from clichés, arguing that 2Face used animation to “change the standard of how a music video should and ought to be produced” through originality and storytelling rather than familiar visuals.

== Critical reception ==
Professional ratings
Review scores
Source	Rating
Jaguda	8.5/10
TayoTV	9/10
Nigerian Entertainment Today	4/5 stars

The album received generally positive reviews from critics. Ayomide Tayo of Nigerian Entertainment Today rated the album a 4/5, saying that the album was "matured, calm and layered with emotion" and had "well-thought concepts". Wilfred Okiche liked the album, saying that the album gives "a more mature 2Face Idibia, in content, sound, lyrics and vocals". Away and Beyond was granted a 9/10 by TayoTV's Amb Noni, who praised it for its powerful messages and meaningful lyrics, describing the album as "one of the best albums out of Nigeria in at least 2 years".

Arinze Obikili, a writer for Jaguda, praised Away & Beyond by 2Face Idibia for its maturity, originality, and cohesive production, noting that it was a rare album where he "didn’t feel the need to skip any songs." He gave the album a rating of 8.5/10. An unknown writer for We Plug Good Music stated, "2Face Idibia outdoes himself on Away & Beyond and surpasses 2010's The Unstoppable to deliver this amazing new album", and said that the album has "stellar production and a huge versatility of sounds" and that the album would be hard to top in the year of 2012.

=== Accolades ===
Awards and nominations for Away & Beyond
Organization	Year	Category	Result	Ref.
The Headies 2013	2013	Best R&B/Pop Album	Nominated	

== Track listing ==
Away & Beyond standard edition track listing
No.	Title	Writer(s)	Producer(s)	Length
1.	"Higher (Spiritual Healing)" (featuring Huma Lara)	Innocent Idibia; Huma Lara	Femdouble	3:55
2.	"Omo T'osan"	Idibia	Jay Sleek	4:34
3.	"Bother You" (featuring Terry Tha Rapman)	Idibia; Terry Madaki	Femdouble	4:16
4.	"Spell Bound"	Idibia; Arsonal	Dark Secret International	3:30
5.	"Steady Steady"	Idibia	Jay Sleek	4:16
6.	"Dance in the Rain"	Idibia; Femi Ojetunde; Olubunmi Afolabi	Femdouble	3:38
7.	"In Your Eyes"	Idibia	Jay Sleek	4:15
8.	"Freedom Is Life"	Idibia; Clutchie	Clutchie	3:09
9.	"Rainbow"	Idibia; Ojetunde; Afolabi	Femdouble; G.$ol the Producer	4:18
10.	"Dance Floor"	Idibia; Ojetunde; Afolabi	Femdouble; G.$ol the Producer; DJ Willie O	4:13
11.	"Keep On Pushing"	Idibia	Spellz	2:58
12.	"Ihe Neme"	Idibia	Jay Sleek	4:13
13.	"Omo No Dulling" (featuring Dammy Krane, Rocksteady)	Idibia; Oyindamola Emmanuel; Ibrahim Oboromboro	Spellz	4:20
14.	"Bad Man, Bad Girl" (with Becca)	Idibia; Rebecca Acheampong	Kaywa; Kiki Banson	3:22
15.	"Chemical Reaction" (featuring Naeto C)	Idibia; Naetochukwu Chikwe	DJ Willie O; 2Baba	3:38
Total length:				58:43

Away & Beyond Plus deluxe edition bonus tracks
No.	Title	Writer(s)	Producer(s)	Length
16.	"Omo T'osan" (Drey Beatz remix)	Idibia	Drey Beatz	3:52
17.	"Dance Floor" (remix; featuring Sarkodie)	Idibia; Michael Addo; Iva Manuel Lemus	Femdouble; G.$ol the Producer; DJ Willie O	3:58
18.	"Rainbow" (remix; featuring T-Pain)	Idibia; Faheem Najm	Femdouble; G.$ol the Producer	4:26
Total length:				58:43

== Personnel ==
- Ben'Jamin "Spellz" Obadje – production
- Jerry "Jay Sleek" Shelika – production
- Clutchie – production
- David "Kaywa" Kyei – production
- Kiki Banson – production
- Willie "DJ Willie O" Oputa Chukwuemeka – production
- Femi "Femdouble" Ojetunde – production, mixing
- Olubunmi "G.$ol" Afolabi – production, mixing
- Zeeno Foster – mixing

== Release history ==
Release history and formats for Away & Beyond
Region	Date	Format	Label
Nigeria	30 April 2012	CD; digital download	Hypertek Entertainment
