= Iceberg Slim (musician) =

American rapper

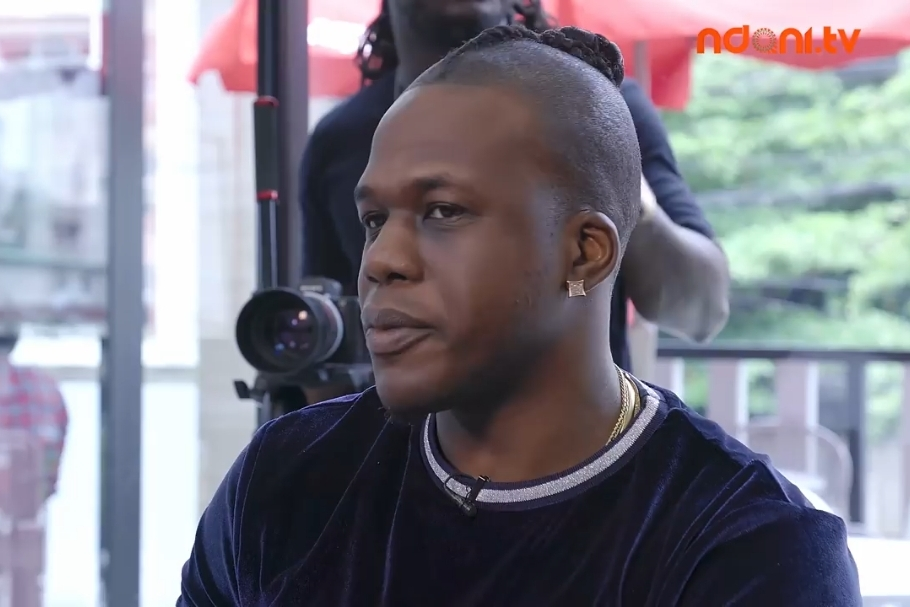

Background information
- Born: Olusegun Olowokere; 7 August; New York City, New York, U.S.
- Genres: Hip hop; Afropop
- Occupations: Rapper; singer; songwriter; audio engineer; music producer; Filmmaker; music video director; cinematographer
- Years active: 2008–present
- Labels: G-Worldwide (former); 323 Entertainment (former)
- Citizenship: American; Nigerian
- Education: John Jay; IAR

Olusegun Olowokere, known by his stage name Iceberg Slim, is an American-Nigerian rapper, and singer, widely known for his controversial self-proclaimed status as being "Better than M.I", which became the most talked about topic in the Nigerian hip hop space between June and August 2009, few months after he won the Nigeria Entertainment Awards, in the Best International Artist category.

== Early life ==
Iceberg Slim was born Olusegun Olowokere in New York City on August 7, to Nigerian parents. He is the youngest born of four kids. His music journey began in the church choir at the age of 12, at Christ Apostolic Church, where he became a chorister. While in the choir he began learning how to play musical instruments and later became the church drummer, then later the keyboardist.

He wanted to become an FBI Agent, but his passion for music made him drop out from John Jay, after two years of enrollment, to pursue his musical dream. He graduated from the Institute of Audio Research, with a certification in Audio Engineering and Production. In the course of his study, he tells This Day, "I learnt a lot about music production, video production, and editing.

== Career ==
In 2008, he released his mixtape Soul Food, with featuring guess vocals from Sauce Kid, Zara, and Blak Jesus.

On 25 December 2008, he features on "Big Boy (rap remix)" by eLDee, alongside Rukus and Proto of Chiddy Bang, from the Big Boy studio album, released on 21 August 2008, by eLDee. Same year, he performed at the Apollo Theater, in Harlem, New York City. In 2009, he fearued on the remix of Banky W., song "Lagos Party", with Naeto C, D'Banj, 9ice, eLDee & Muna. In 2009, he recruited, the American rapper Ja Rule on the remix of "Plenty Money", as one of the lead singles off his online mixtape titled The Fix, which features Ja Rule, Sauce Kid, Banky W., eLDee, and Rico White, the same year. In 2010, Iceberg recorded "Blue Bloods" for the American CBS original Crime-Drama series, Blue Bloods. It was used in Season 1, Episode 2 for a total of 60secs, says the Ghanaian blogger Ameyaw Debrah. Same year, Iceberg features Da Grin on "I Made It", produced by Sarz.

On 6 May 2011, he released "Too Much Money", featuring Banky W., under G-Worldwide, which became a hit track and earned him two nominations at The Headies 2012, for Best Rap Single, and Lyricist on the Roll category, shortly after he relocated back to Nigeria, to pursue his career full-time in the industry. In 2012, he began his singing career, following the release of "Ayanfe", on 14 June 2012, with backup vocals from Emma Nyra, and a remix featuring Emma Nyra, and M.I, after Iceberg and M.I squashed their battle. "Ayanfe remix" video features a cameo appearance from Eva Alordiah, and tells the romantic story of a lady played by Eva, who has had love trials.

On February 13, 2013, DJ Jimmy Jatt, collaborated with Ice Prince and Iceberg on the song "Cool As Ice", produced by Chopstix. Same year he joined 323 Entertainment, Tiwa Savage featured him on "Shout-out", longside Ghanaian rapper, Sarkodie, from Once Upon a Time studio album, released on July 3, 2013, by Mavin, and 323 Entertainment. On 7 August 2014, Iceberg was featured on "Confessions" from the mixtape A7 by Vector. In 2014, 2face Idibia, collaborated with Rocksteady and Iceberg on "The Best I Can Be", from the studio album The Ascension, on 21 July 2014, through Hypertek Digital, and 960 Music Group. Same year, Praiz collaborated with, Skales, Morell, King, and Iceberg, on the song "Jalabia and Snapbacks", from his two sided studio album Rich & Famous, side of Famous, released on 12 December 2014, through X3M Music,

In 2015, Tiwa Savage features Iceberg on her sophomore studio album R.E.D, on "Make Time", released on December 19, 2015, through Mavin, and 323 Entertainment. During the R.E.D album tour, Dr SID, Ezinne, Kaffy, and Iceberg Slim, joined her on tour in Houston. On May 19, 2016, IceBerg released "Wave", featuring Davido, under 323 Entertainment. On 7 March 2017, he collaborated with Davido, Shatta Wale, Terry Apala, Wale Turner, and L.A.X on the remix of "Wave". In 2017, Sean Tizzle, features Iceberg on "Roll Up", off Moving Forward (Vol. 1) studio album, released on 3 February 2017, through Tizzle Nation. On 4 August 2017, "Roll Up" music video was released, directed by Seyi for UA Images. On 16 December 2017, Iceberg Slim, and Juliet Ibrahim signed a brand ambassador deal with the international perfume brand, OROS.

On 1 March 2018, Iceberg spoke at Social Media Week Lagos conference, where he discussed "Digital Romance: Love And Relationships In The Era Of Social Media". On 7 August 2019, Iceberg released "Way Up", featuring Robbie Celeste. On 26 September 2019, Damayo features Iceberg, and Psycho YP, on "Coconut". On 28 August 2020, he released "Owo", produced by Altims. On 2 December 2020, he released the music video, and shot by Base Films, in America.

== Controversy ==
=== Feuds ===
In 2009, Iceberg was embroiled in a feud with M.I, shortly after Iceberg released a single titled Mr International where he said the lines: "Am I better than M.I? I don't know. Am I? Matter of fact you should ask M.I". That apparently didn't sit too well with M.I, prompting him to release a single known as "Somebody Wants To Die", featuring his label mate Ice Prince on the track. Less than 48 hours after the release of M.I's "Somebody Wants to Die" IceBerg Slim released "Assassination" and sources quote that his Facebook status at the time of the release read "Somebody Wants To Die", I'll be responsible for the "Assassination" ... let the countdown begin ... (I told em it would be a M.I.stake, but they didn't listen)". There was a contest in the mind of rap fans on who happened to be the best rapper in Nigeria. M.I developed more fans than Iceberg Slim and had more hit records, while Iceberg Slim gained hearts on Nigerian rap fans in a very short and unusual period. In 2012, both rappers decided to sweep the feud under the rug. Iceberg stated, "I don't think I picked on MI. It was a healthy competition in Hip-Hop, which most people don't understand. In Hip-Hop community, we could be best friends or brothers and I can say I'm the best rapper in the world and no one takes offense or takes it personal. My shot at MI wasn't a sign of disrespect in any way. Though sarcastic, it was healthy. People just took it out of context and thought I was dissing him. Rap music is all about competition because it helps you grow and improve on yourself."

=== Relationship ===
Slim was in a relationship with Juliet Ibrahim, which ended in 2018.

== Personal life ==
Iceberg is cousin to the American music producer Milwaukee Buck, well known as Buck 3000, who is one of the first Grammy award-winning producers, and sound engineers to receive the special recognition award from The Recording Academy in 2003, for his role on Ashanti self-titled album Ashanti in the Best Contemporary R&B Album category.

== Performances ==
| Date | Event | Country | Ref(s) |
|---|---|---|---|
| 17 December 2011 | NotJustOk Music Concert | Nigeria | |
| 8 August 2016 | R.E.D album tour | United States | |

== Cameo appearances ==
| Title | Year | Album |
|---|---|---|
| "High Notes" (Banky W.) | 2015 | Songs About U |

== Awards and nominations ==
| Year | Award | Category | Nominee/Work | Result |
|---|---|---|---|---|
| 2009 | Nigeria Entertainment Awards | Best International Artist | Himself | Won |
| 2012 | The Headies | Best Rap Single | "Too Much Money" | Nominated |
| 2012 | The Headies | Lyricist on the Roll | "Too Much Money" | Nominated |
