= The Unstoppable =

2008 album by 2Face Idibia

Studio album by 2Face Idibia
- Released: 20 December 2008
- Recorded: 2008
- Genre: R&B
- Length: 77:11
- Label: Hypertek
- Producer: Jay Sleek; Jiggy Jegg; Mic Tunes; R. Kelly; Ozzy; Spankie; Sharks

2Face Idibia chronology
Grass 2 Grace (2006)	The Unstoppable (2008)	The Unstoppable International Edition (2010)

Singles from The Unstoppable
- 1. "Enter the Place" Released: 27 August 2008

The Unstoppable is the third solo studio album by Nigerian singer 2Face Idibia, released on 20 December 2008, by his label Hypertek Entertainment. The album's production was handled by Jay Sleek, Jiggy Jegg, Ozzy, Spankie, and Sharks, with one track "Flex" produced by R. Kelly and featuring him on the track. The release of the album was marred with a number of delays and difficulties and relatively poor reviews as actual sales of the album in comparison to the initial two solo albums Face 2 Face (2004) and Grass 2 Grace (2006) were below expectations. In 2010, 2Face Idibia went on to release his fourth studio album The Unstoppable International Edition that contained seven tracks from The Unstoppable and seven new ones.

== Background ==
The Unstoppable followed a period of negative press around 2Face Idibia. Between 2006 and 2009, media attention shifted from his music to his personal life, which included several robbery incidents and reports about his relationships. He also faced criticism after the Plantashun Boiz split and disputes over the credit for "African Queen". These events affected the reception of The Unstoppable, which he later described as poorly received due to mixing issues and intense media focus on his private life. In 2008 and 2009, he released singles like "Flex" and "Enter the Place", which drew controversy, including reports that the latter's video had been banned. During the same period, he worked outside the structure of a major label and experimented with more creative freedom. He titled the album The Unstoppable as a response to the press coverage, saying it reflected his attempt to show that he intended to move forward.

== Singles ==
The first and only single from the album was the pre-released "Enter The Place", in anticipation of the release of the album. The single featured the Nigerian recording artist Sound Sultan and was released on 27 August 2008.

== Critical reception ==
A writer for Independent newspaper noted that while some tracks on The Unstoppable were less engaging, the album "has somewhat redeemed [Idibia] musically." They deemed the songs "Take It Back", "Outside", "Feeling You", and "I Sing", reminiscent of his debut album Face 2 Face (2004). The review also mentioned collaborations with R. Kelly and Chaka Demus and Pliers, but observed that the most compelling songs did not feature any high-profile artists.

=== Accolades ===
Year	Awards ceremony	Award description(s)	Results	Ref.
2009	The Headies	Album of the Year	Won	
2009	The Headies	Best R&B/Pop Album	Won	
2009	Nigeria Entertainment Awards	Best Album of the Year	Nominated	

== Track listing ==
The Unstopabble track listing
No.	Title	Writer(s)	Producer(s)	Length
1.	"Intro"	Innocent Idibia	—	1:16
2.	"Enter the Place" (featuring Sound Sultan)	Idibia; Olanrewaju Fasasi	Jiggy Jegg	4:21
3.	"Take It Back" (featuring Cartiair)	Idibia; Fredereick Benson	Jay Sleek	4:35
4.	"Outside"	Idibia	Jay Sleek	3:56
5.	"Can't Do Without You" (featuring Melissa Briggs)	Idibia	Mic Tunes	4:17
6.	"Free" (featuring Lil Ehi Idibia)	Idibia	Jiggy Jegg	3:50
7.	"Pako"	Idibia	Jiggy Jegg	5:01
8.	"So Proud (Remix)" (with Chaka Demus & Pliers)	Idibia; John Taylor; Everton Bonner	Chaka Demus & Pliers	4:03
9.	"Flex" (featuring R. Kelly and Natz)	Idibia; Robert Kelly; Owoyemi Nathaniel	R. Kelly	3:44
10.	"Oh Papa"	Idibia	Jay Sleek	5:13
11.	"Go Down There" (featuring Sway)	Idibia; Derek Safo	Sharks	5:01
12.	"Excuse Me Sister"	Idibia	Ozzy	4:19
13.	"Appreciate It"	Idibia	Wayne Mc Neishe	4:14
14.	"Jungle Don Mature" (featuring Rocksteady)	Idibia	Jay Sleek	4:01
15.	"Feeling You"	Idibia	Spankie	4:22
16.	"I Sing"	Idibia	Jay Sleek	5:41
17.	"See It Coming" (featuring Wyre)	Idibia; Kevin Waire	Jay Sleek	3:27
18.	"Fly"	Idibia	Jiggy Jegg	4:10
19.	"Outro"	Idibia	—	1:40
Total length:				77:11

Notes

- "—" denotes a skit

== The Unstoppable International Edition (2010) ==
The Unstoppable International Edition

Studio album by 2Face Idibia
- Released: 27 June 2010
- Recorded: 2010
- Studio: Zane Studios
- Genre: R&B; soft rock; hip-hop; reggae
- Length: 54:59
- Label: Hypertek
- Producer: Jay Sleek; Jiggy Jegg; OJB Jezreel; Wayne Mc Neishe

2Face Idibia chronology
The Unstoppable (2008)	The Unstoppable International Edition (2010)	Away and Beyond (2012)

Singles from The Unstoppable International Edition
- 1. "Implication" Released: 22 January 2010; 2. "Only Me" Released: 21 May 2010

The Unstoppable International Edition is the fourth studio album by the Nigerian R&B artist 2Face Idibia, released on 27 June 2010, through his label Hypertek Entertainment. As the name suggests, the album is the international edition of the artist's third and previous album The Unstoppable (see above). It is one of the few Nigerian albums to be successfully sold at a retail price of ₦1000. The album received generally positive reviews from critics and was supported by two singles, "Implication" and "Only Me", which received a lot of airplay on radios and at various hotspots around Nigeria.

=== Background ===
After the first version of The Unstoppable struggled, 2Face began work on a new edition. He recorded new songs with Jay Sleek, including "Implication" and "Only Me", both of which originated from earlier sessions but became central to the project. Before the album’s release, Hypertek issued an EP featuring its artists, and some of the tracks were later included on the International Edition. For the International Edition, he aimed for a different sound and presentation. He said he wanted fewer distractions and focused on making a project that met what he considered international standards. The album was sold at a higher price point and packaged to match that approach. He said piracy shaped the release strategy, as pirates often bought distribution rights upfront. He reported earning about ₦30 million from these deals.

=== Singles ===
The album's lead single, "Implication", is an up-tempo party track with Idibia only. It was initially leaked in December 2009 and officially released on 22 January 2010. Its accompanying music video features a different mix than the single version The second single, "Only Me" was released on 21 May 2010, coinciding with the album's release in Nigeria. It is a slow soul song in which Idibia's lyrics and rhythm fuse every day issues into an enjoyable track. Both singles were produced by Jay Sleek.

=== Critical reception ===
Oye Akideinde of 360nobs called The Unstoppable International Edition a "classic", characterizing it as a "distinct sweet sounding mix of R'n'B, soft rock, hip-hop & reggae." He concluded that "for Nigeria, Africa & all the fertile ladies, he is UNSTOPPABLE," and rated it 9.0/10.

=== Accolades ===
Year	Awards ceremony	Award description(s)	Results	Ref.
2011	The Headies	Album of the Year	Won	
2011	The Headies	Best R&B/Pop Album	Won	
2011	Nigeria Entertainment Awards	Best Album of the Year	Nominated	

=== Track listing ===
The Unstoppable International Edition track listing
No.	Title	Writer(s)	Producer(s)	Length
1.	"Rain Drops"	Innocent Idibia	Jay Sleek	4:47
2.	"Be There"	Idibia	OJB Jezreel; Jay Sleek	3:09
3.	"Take it Back" (featuring Cartiair)	Idibia; Fredereick Benson	Jay Sleek	4:33
4.	"I Sing"	Idibia	Jay Sleek	5:46
5.	"Free" (featuring Ehi Idibia)	Idibia	Jiggy Jegg	3:09
6.	"Enter the Place" (featuring Sound Sultan)	Idibia; Olanrewaju Fasasi	Jiggy Jegg	4:19
7.	"Implication"	Idibia	Jay Sleek	3:27
8.	"Emotions"	Idibia	Jay Sleek	3:15
9.	"Only Me"	Idibia	Jay Sleek	3:47
10.	"Outside"	Idibia	Jay Sleek	3:54
11.	"Be There" (remix; featuring M.I)	Idibia; Jude Abaga	Jay Sleek	4:26
12.	"Fly"	Idibia	Jiggy Jegg	4:08
13.	"Appreciate It"	Idibia	Wayne Mc Neishe	4:08
14.	"Power of Naija" (hidden track; with Cobhams Asuquo and Omawumi)	Idibia; Asuquo; Omawumi Megbele	Cobhams Asuquo	4:41

== Release history ==
Release history and formats for The Unstoppable International Edition
Region	Date	Format	Label
Nigeria	28 May 2010	CD	Hypertek
Worldwide	27 June 2010	CD; digital download	Hypertek
