= Peruzzi (singer) =

Nigerian singer

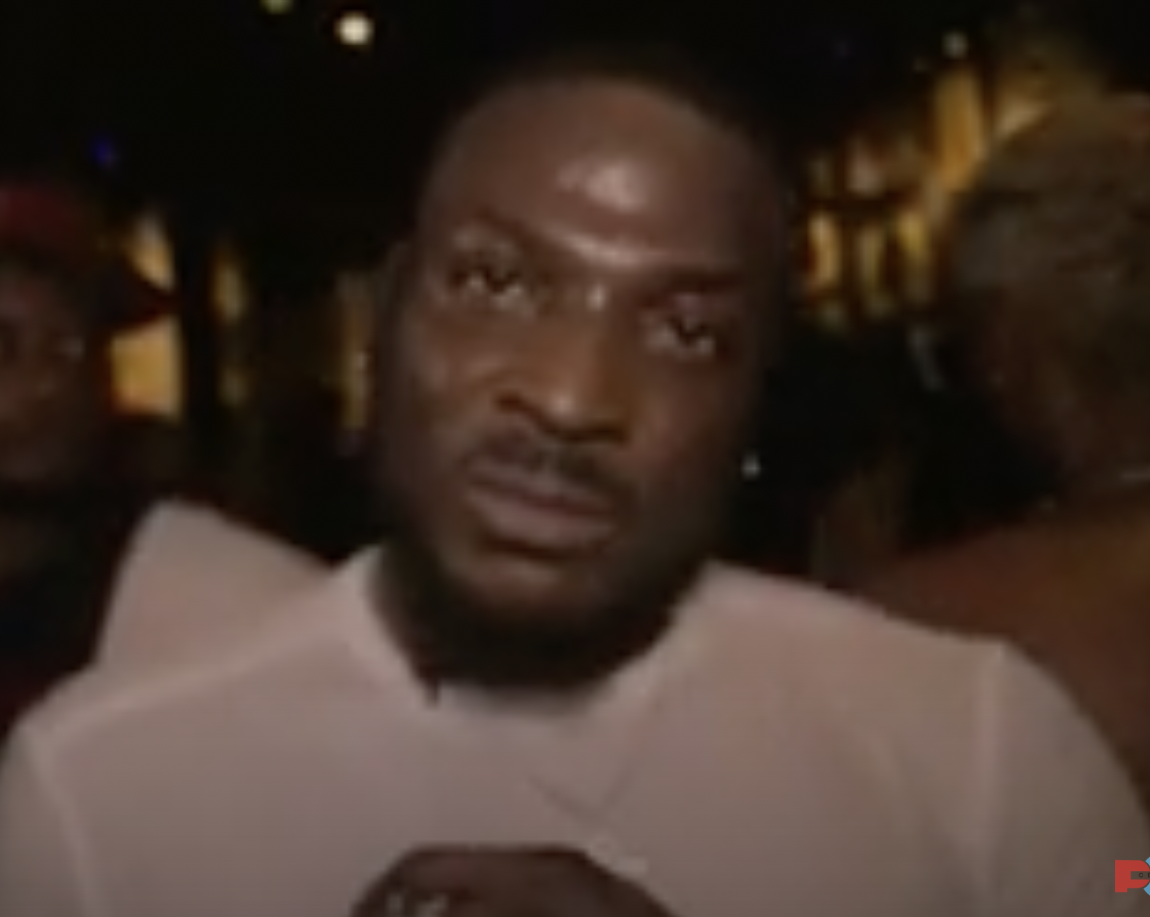
- Peruzzi in 2019

Background information
- Born: Tobechukwu Okoh; 5 December 1989 (age 36); Delta State, Nigeria
- Genres: Afrobeat, R&B
- Years active: 2016
- Label: Davido Music Worldwide

Tobechukwu Victor Okoh (born 5 December 1989), known as Peruzzi, is a Nigerian singer. He began recording music after working with Rodney Malice at the age of seven. In 2017, he was signed to Davido's DMW imprint. In February 2018, Peruzzi was featured on 2Baba's single "Amaka".

== Career ==
Peruzzi began his musical career with Golden Boy Records in 2016, before getting signed to Davido Music Worldwide in 2017. Peruzzi's 2018 single "Majesty", off his Heartwork EP featured a cameo appearance by 2018 Big Brother Naija runner up Cee-C. Prior to the release of "Majesty", the singer had been maligned by many social media users in Nigeria who claimed the singer only shines on featured songs. He featured on 2Baba's song "Amaka" in February 2018.

In August 2026, Peruzzi received songwriting credits on three tracks from Nigerian singer Davido's sixth studio album, Oriadé: "Guide," "I Know Who I Be," and "Already Falling." The 13-track album marked 15 years since Davido's professional music career began, blending themes of faith, love, gratitude, and personal growth.

== Discography ==
=== Singles ===
- Amaka with 2Baba (2018)
- Champion Lover ft. Burna Boy (2018)
- Majesty (2018)
- Did You (2018)
- Dina (2018)
- Run am (2018)
- Craze (2018)
- Sangbana (2018)
- Run am (2018)
- Try (2018)
- For your pocket (2018)
- Bleed (2019)
- Six 30 (with Davido) (2019)
- Nana (2019)
- The Box (2020)
- Cinatti Love (2020)
- Gunshot (2020)
- Lagbaja (2020)
- Isolova (2020)
- Southy Love ft Fireboy DML (2020)
- Somebody Baby ft Davido (2021)
- Ready Ft Ace Berg Tm – Ready (2022)
- Peruzzi Ft Reekado Banks – Ozumba Mbadiwe (Refix Cover)
- Pressure ft Fireboy DML (2023)
- Nsogbu Ft Odumodublvck (2023)

=== Studio albums ===
- Heartwork (2018)
- Huncho Vibez (2019)
- Rum & Boogie (2021)

== Accolades ==
| Year | Awards ceremony | Award description(s) | Recipient | Results | Ref |
|---|---|---|---|---|---|
| 2018 | The Headies | Rookie of The Year | Himself | Nominated | |
| 2018 | City People Music Awards | Rookie of the Year | Himself | Won | |
| 2019 | Top Naija Music Awards | Best Collaboration with "A" List Artiste | "Pick Call Kilode" (Problinkz) | Won | |
