= Grass 2 Grace =

Studio album by 2Face Idibia
- Released: December 8, 2006
- Genre: R&B
- Length: 42:41
- Label: Kennis Music
- Producer: Kenny Ogungbe (exec.); Omololu Ogunleye; 2Face Idibia; OJB Jezreel; Ralph Akali; Mic Tunes

2Face Idibia chronology
Face 2 Face (2004)	Grass 2 Grace (2006)	The Unstoppable (2008)

Singles from Grass 2 Grace
- 1. "4 Instance"; 2. "No Shaking"; 3. "If Love is a Crime"; 4. "True Love"; 5. "My Love"

Grass 2 Grace is the second solo studio album by Nigerian musician 2Baba. It was released by Kennis Music on December 8, 2006. The album won several accolades, including Best Album of the Year at the 2007 Nigeria Entertainment Awards. Grace 2 Grace was supported by the singles "No Shaking", "4 Instance", "If Love is a Crime", "True Love", and "My Love".

== Accolades ==
Year	Awards ceremony	Award description(s)	Results	Ref.
2007	A.M.E.N Awards	Best Pop Album	Nominated	
2007	A.M.E.N Awards	Album of the Year	Won	
2007	Nigeria Entertainment Awards	Best Album of the Year	Won	
2008	Hip Hop World Awards	Best R&B/Pop Album	Won	
2008	Hip Hop World Awards	Album of the Year	Nominated	

== Track listing ==
No.	Title	Writer(s)	Length
1.	"Intro (Skit)"	Innocent Ujah Idibia	1:15
2.	"One Love"	Idibia	3:51
3.	"No Shaking"	Idibia	4:31
4.	"I Dey Feel Like"	Idibia	4:21
5.	"See Me So"	Idibia	4:40
6.	"Skit (Story)"	Idibia	0:30
7.	"E Be Like Say" (featuring Soul E)	Idibia	4:46
8.	"True Love"	Idibia; 2Me	4:21
9.	"4 Instance"	Idibia	4:47
10.	"If Love is a Crime"	Idibia	4:29
11.	"Ocho"	Idibia	4:18
12.	"My Love" (featuring V.I.P)	Idibia; Abdul Hamidu Ibrahim; Emmanuel Ababio; Joseph Nana Ofori	5:33
13.	"Outro (Skit)"	Idibia	0:10
Total length:			42:41

== Release history ==
Country	Date	Format	Label
Nigeria	December 8, 2006	CD	Kennis Music
Nigeria	May 20, 2007	Digital download	Kennis Music
