= Victor Uwaifo =

Nigerian musician (1941–2021)

Victor Uwaifo MON
- Also known as: Guitar boy
- Born: Victor Efosa Uwaifo; 1 March 1941; Benin City, Colonial Nigeria
- Origin: Edo State
- Died: 28 August 2021 (aged 80) Benin City, Nigeria
- Genres: Highlife
- Occupation: Musician
- Years active: 1960–2021
- Labels: Hypertek Digital, 960 Music Group

Victor Efosa Uwaifo MON (1 March 1941 – 28 August 2021) was a Nigerian musician, writer, sculptor, and musical instrument inventor, university lecturer, and the first commissioner for Arts, Culture and Tourism in Nigeria. He was the winner of the first Gold disc in Africa ("Joromi") released in 1965 and seven other Gold discs in "Guitar Boy", "Arabade", the Ekassa series and his Akwete music. He recorded under the name "Victor Uwaifo and His Titibitis".

== Early life and education ==
Victor Efosa Uwaifo was born in Benin City, Edo State, Colonial Nigeria and obtained his secondary school education at the Western Boys' High School Benin and St Gregory's College, Lagos, from 1957 to 1961. He began playing guitar when he was 12 years old, his earliest popular music influences being records of Spanish and Latin American music. He studied graphics at Yaba College of Technology, Lagos State and graduated in 1961–63 at the age of 22.

When he was 54 years old, he received a bachelor's degree with first-class honours (valedictorian) and in 1997, aged 56, a master's degree from the University of Benin where he studied fine and applied arts and majored in sculpture. The thesis for his PhD in architectural sculpture was entitled A reinvention of Benin Royal Ancestral Pieces, University of Benin, Nigeria.

== Career ==
After leaving Benin, Uwaifo continued playing music at St Gregory's College, Lagos. He was a contemporary of Segun Bucknor, and they were both among the leading Lagos high school bandleaders at the time. During school holidays and weekends, he jammed with Olaiya's All Stars band. After completing secondary school studies, he played with E.C. Arinze's highlife during late hours. Uwaifo also briefly worked with Stephen Osadebe and Fred Coker before he formed Melody Maestros in 1965. The band released "Joromi", which became a hit in Nigeria and other parts of West Africa. Uwaifo made history when he won the first Gold record in Nigeria, West Africa and Africa (presented by Philips, West Africa), for his song "Joromi" in 1996.

Between 1965 and 1968, he developed the Akwete rhythm sound. In 1969, he launched a new beat called Shadow accompanied by a new dance also called shadow, a mixture of Akwete and twist. The sound was released when soul music was popular in Lagos and lasted a few years. After the launch of Shadow, the Melody Maestros went on tour of various Nigerian cities. Uwaifo later experimented with a new rhythm that was similar to soul but soon left it for Ekassa, an interpretation of a traditional Benin sound. In 1971, Uwaifo opened the Joromi Hotel in Benin City, and within ten years established his own television studio. From there, he produced a national weekly music and culture programme.

Uwaifo, who had a total of 12 golden records to date, travelled to many countries including the United States, Russia, Japan, United Kingdom, Bulgaria, Romania, Germany, France, Hungary, Italy, Ghana, Ivory Coast (Côte d'Ivoire), Togo, Benin Republic, Spain, and Canada.

== National recognition ==
The Federal Government of Nigeria, in appreciation of his talents and contributions to Nigeria, honored Uwaifo with a National Honors Merit Award in 1983, which read in part:

"... whereas you have been nominated and appointed as Member of the Order of the Niger to have and hold and enjoy the privileges of the Federal Republic of Nigeria of the said Order, MON."

Uwaifo was the first professional musician in Nigeria to receive such an award. He was a Justice of the Peace and had served in many capacities. Uwaifo was also appointed the Honorable Commissioner for Arts, Culture, and Tourism and a Member of the State Executive Council, the highest policy-making decision body in Edo State from 2001 to 2003.

Appointed Justice of Peace (JP), Public Notary, and Lay Magistrate, Victor Uwaifo was honoured by four Nigerian Presidents. He was awarded the National Honours of Nigeria (MON). He was invited to the State House by four Presidents and heads of state of Nigeria.

== International recognition ==
In 1995, Uwaifo was invited by the United Nations Staff Day International Committee to perform during the UN Golden Jubilee celebration. He was cited in the Grove Dictionary of Music and Musicians, 1983 edition, documented in the "Who's Who in Nigeria", "Who's Who in Africa", "Who's Who in the Commonwealth", and "Men and Women of Distinction in the Commonwealth" sections. He was an Honorary Member of the Biographical Advisory Council, Cambridge, England; a member of both the Performing Right Society, and of the advisory board of American Heritage University, California, US. He was the first Nigerian to win a gold disc in Africa, (Joromi) released in 1965 at the age of 24 years old.

== Business enterprises ==
Uwaifo was the Chairman of Joromi Organization, a multi-track recording and television studio in Benin City. He ran and managed an art gallery and the Victor Uwaifo Hall of Fame.

== Personal life ==
Uwaifo's hobbies included swimming, bodybuilding, gaming, reading and writing. He was a Christian and was married with children.

He was also a lecturer at the Department of Fine and Applied Arts at the University of Benin, Benin City, Edo State, Nigeria.

He died on 28 August 2021 at the age of 80.

== Discography ==
- Sir Victor Uwaifo Guitar Boy Superstar 1970-76 (2008, Soundway)

Contributing artist

- The Rough Guide to Highlife (2003, World Music Network)
- The Rough Guide To Psychedelic Africa (2012, World Music Network)
- The Rough Guide to African Disco (2013, World Music Network)
