= Hypertek Digital =

Nigerian record label

- Parent company: 960 Music Group (owns 40%)
- Founded: 2013
- Founder: 2Baba
- Distributor: Sony Music Publishing
- Genre: Various genres
- Country of origin: Nigeria

Hypertek Digital (formerly known as Hypertek Entertainment; prior to 2006–2013) is a Nigerian based record label founded by recording artist 2Baba. The label currently distributes through Sony Music Publishing, a unit of Sony Music Group. The label currently houses recording music act 2Baba, Victor Uwaifo, and RockSteady. Artists formerly signed to the label, include Dammy Krane.

== History ==
Hypertek Digital was founded in 2013 by 2Baba, it formerly operates under the name Hypertek Entertainment from 2006 to 2013. The entertainment company, 960 Music Group acquired forty percent of Hypertek Entertainment, alongside Aristokrat Records. In 2013, 2Baba officially signaled the end of Hypertek Entertainment, and launched Hypertek Digital as its new imprint under 960 Music Group.

It was established following 2Baba's departure from Kennis Music, a record label owned by Kehinde Ogungbe, and Dayo Adeneye.

On 15 September 2020, Hypertek Digital signed publishing deal with Sony/ATV Music Publishing. According to 2Baba, the deal, presents top-level expertise, structure and experience to unlock opportunities on a global scale for Hypertek Digital, and its artists.

== Departure ==
=== Dammy Krane and credit card fraud ===
In 2017, Dammy Krane was kicked out of Hypertek Digital by 2Baba, as Ademola Olonilua shared a story with The Punch saying, it was for a very wrong reason as he was arrested for credit card fraud and grand theft in the United States. A source very close to the singer, in a chat with Saturday Beats said part of his woes was his expulsion from Hypertek.

== Artists ==
=== Current acts ===
Act	Year signed
RockSteady	2012
Victor Uwaifo	2013

=== Former acts ===
Act	Year signed	Year left	Releases under the label
Dammy Krane	2012	2017	1

== Discography ==
Artist	Album	Details
2face Idibia	The Unstoppable	Released: December 20, 2008; Chart Position: —; Certification: —
2face Idibia	The Unstoppable International Edition	Released: June 27, 2010; Chart Position: —; Certification: —
2face Idibia	Away & Beyond	Released: April 30, 2012; Chart Position: —; Certification: —
2face Idibia	The Ascension	Released: July 21, 2014; Chart Position: 12 (Billboard); Certification: —
Dammy Krane	The Enterkraner	Released: August 21, 2014; Chart Position: —; Certification: —
Victor Uwaifo	Legend Reborn	Released: February 2, 2015; Chart Position: —; Certification: —
2Baba	Rewind, Select, Update	Released: February 17, 2015; Chart Position: —; Certification: —
2Baba	Warriors	Released: February 28, 2020; Chart Position: —; Certification: —
