= Praiz =

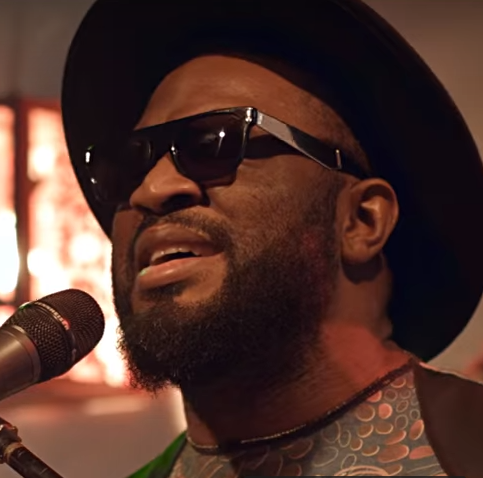
- Praiz in 2015

Background information
- Also known as: Mr. Rich & Famous
- Born: Praise Ugbede Adejo; 8 March 1985 (age 41)
- Origin: Kogi State, Nigeria
- Genres: R&B
- Occupations: Singer, songwriter
- Instruments: Vocals, piano
- Years active: 2007–present
- Labels: CICADA Music, X3M Music

Praise Ugbede Adejo (born 8 March 1985), better known by his stage name Praiz, is a Nigerian R&B singer, songwriter, and producer. Praiz finished second runner-up at the maiden season of Project Fame West Africa. He is best known for releasing singles "Rich and Famous", "Sisi" and "I Love You". He contributed guest vocals to Bez's 2011 single "That Stupid Song"; the music video for the song mentioned was the first African video to make a world premiere on BET’s 106 & Park. He is currently signed to Cicada Music.

== Early life and education ==
Praiz, a native of Igala in Kogi State, was born in Lagos but later relocated to Kaduna in 1992 after his father was transferred there on missionary work. He is the second child out of five children. He has a National Diploma in Computer Science after graduating from Kaduna Polytechnic.

== Career ==
=== Project Fame West Africa ===
Praiz had been doing well in music before he shot into the limelight after emerging second runner-up in the first edition of Project Fame West Africa, a music reality T.V show which Iyanya went on to win. His performance in the competition increased his fan base, making him one of the next-rated stars in the Nigerian music industry.

=== 2010–present: Rich & Famous ===
Praiz has worked with several artists, including Awilo Longomba, Cobhams, Wizkid, Seyi Shay, Bez and MI. One of his many works is a song he collaborated with fellow Nigerian artiste Bez on the hit single "That Stupid Song", which went on to be the first African video to make a world premiere on BET’s 106 & Park. On 22 July 2012, he released the hit single titled "Rich and Famous", which got positive reviews and massive airplay, thus getting him nominated in several award events. On 14 December 2014, Praiz released his double studio album titled Rich & Famous [Rich] (sized A) and Rich & Famous [Famous] (sized B).

== Style of music ==
Known to be a soul and R&B artiste, Praiz also has a diverse style in making other genres of music, switching up from R&B to Afropop with commercially appealing songs like "Oshe" and "Mercy". He cites Barry White, Michael Jackson, Carl Thompson and Boyz II Men as people who influence his type of music.

== Personal life ==
Praiz was a brand ambassador for the network service MTN. He is also involved with some charitable organizations, including Safe Motherhood Foundation and Little Big Souls, an organization geared towards helping to reduce premature maternal mortality and assisting women who cannot afford maternal care.

== Discography ==
=== Albums ===
- Rich & Famous (2014)
- 2 Minutes EP (2018)

=== Singles ===
- "Bubbling Under" (2010)
- "The Lockdown" (2011)
- "I Love You" (2011)
- "Jekalo" (2011)
- "A Woman's Need" (2012)
- "Rich and Famous" (2012)
- "For You" (featuring Seyi Shay) (2013)
- "I Love You" (2013)
- "Oshe" (featuring Awilo Longomba) (2013)
- "Sweet Potato" (featuring Chidinma) (2014)
- "Mercy" (2014)
- "Sisi" (featuring Wizkid) (2014)
- "Heartbeat" (2015)
- "Amazing Grace" (2015)
- "Body Hot" (2016) Featuring Jesse Jagz & Stonebwoy
- "2 minutes" (2018)
- "Here and now (2018)
- "Champagne and Flowers (2018)
- "Hustle ft. Stonebwoy (2019)
- "Under The Sky" (2020)

== Awards and nominations ==
Year	Award ceremony	Award description	Result
2012	The Headies 2012	Best Vocal Performance (Male)	Nominated
2012	The Headies 2012	Next Rated Act	Nominated
2012	2012 Nigeria Entertainment Awards	Most Promising Act to Watch	Nominated
2013	2013 Nigeria Entertainment Awards	Best Pop/R&B Artist of the Year	Nominated
2013	City People Awards	Best Rhythm and Blues Singer of the Year	Won
2013	The Headies 2013	Best Vocal Performance	Won
2014	City People Awards	Best Pop/R&B Artist of the Year	Nominated
2014	2014 Nigeria Entertainment Awards	Best Pop/R&B Artist of the Year	Nominated
2015	2015 Nigeria Entertainment Awards	Best Pop/R&B Artist of the Year	Won
2021	The Headies 2021	Best Vocal Performance	Won

== See also ==
- List of Nigerian musicians
