= Spellz (producer) =

- Born: Ben’Jamin Obadje; Lagos State Nigeria
- Citizenship: Nigeria
- Education: Covenant University
- Occupations: Producer, audio engineer
- Years active: 2011–present
- Musical career
- Genres: Afro-pop, hip hop, R&B, contemporary R&B
- Instrument: Piano
- Label: 323 Entertainment

Ben’Jamin Obadje, also known as Spellz, is a Nigerian recording producer. He has produced for artists including Chuddy K, 9ice, Banky W., D'Prince, Davido, Tiwa Savage, Dammy Krane. His production hits include "Gaga Crazy" by Chuddy K, "My Dear" by Dammy Krane, "Check and Balance" by Burna Boy, "Mummy Mi" by Wizkid, "How Long" by Davido, and "Keys to the City" by Tiwa Savage. He is currently signed to 323 Entertainment.

Thisday newspaper ranked him 10th on its 2016 list of the Top 10 Music Producers in Nigeria. On July 28, 2016, Nigerian Entertainment Today ranked him 7th on its monthly list for 10 music producers.

== Personal life ==
Spellz got engaged to Hadiza Dije Badaki on August 31, 2015, and married her on February 28, 2016. Spellz and Badaki had their first baby on February 16, 2017.

== Education ==
He attended Federal Government College, Idoani in Ondo State and then studied Computer science at Covenant University. He left the University after three years because of his love for music.

== Accolades ==
| Year | Awards ceremony | Award description(s) | Results |
|---|---|---|---|
| 2013 | Nigeria Entertainment Awards | Music Producer of the Year | Won |
| 2015 | City People Entertainment Awards | Best Music Producer of the Year | Nominated |
| 2015 | The Beatz Awards | Best Afro Dancehall Producer "Check & Balance (Burna Boy)" | Nominated |
| 2016 | The Beatz Awards | Best Afro Dancehall Producer "Key To The City Remix (Tiwa Savage)" | Nominated |
| 2017 | The Headies | Producer of the Year "Iskaba by (Wande Coal) & Ma Lo by (Tiwa Savage)" | Nominated |
| 2017 | Nigeria Entertainment Awards | Music Producer of the Year "Himself" | Nominated |
| 2018 | The Beatz Awards | Afro Pop Producer Of The Year "Ma Lo by (Tiwa Savage)" | Won |
| 2018 | The Beatz Awards | Producer of the Year "Lova Lova (Tiwa Savage)" | Nominated |
