= Dammy Krane =

Nigerian singer, composer and performer

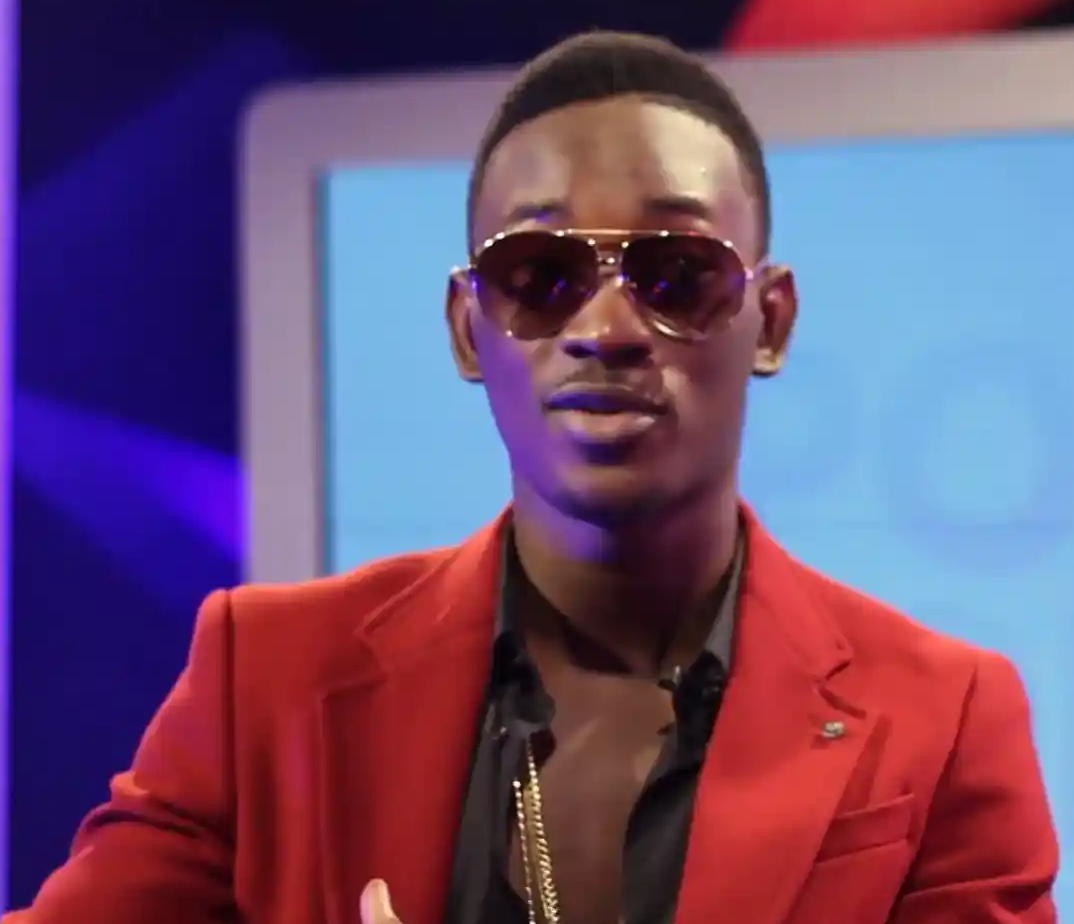

Background information
- Born: Oyindamola Johnson Emmanuel; 11 December 1992 (age 33); Lagos, Nigeria
- Origin: Yoruba
- Genre: Afro-Beats
- Occupations: Singer; songwriter; entertainer
- Instrument: Vocals
- Years active: 2012 – present
- Labels: Hypertek Digital, 960 Music Group worldstar movement

Oyindamola Johnson Emmanuel (born 11 December 1992), popularly known as Dammy Krane, is a Nigerian singer, composer and performer. In January 2012, at age 20, he signed a record deal with Hypertek Digital and 960 Music Group. He is most famous for his single hit "My Dear". Dammy Krane is known for his melodic voice, engaging lyrics and his exciting genre of African alternative music. Dammy Krane has received several nominations, including the Next Rated nomination. He won Rookie of the Year at The Headies 2012.

== Early life and career ==
Oyindamola Johnson was born in Lagos, Nigeria, and originates from the Yoruba ethnic group in South-West Nigeria. Dammy Krane was born to an Oluwakemi Oshodi family (whose father was a manager in the Fuji music industry at the time). Dammy Krane cites this as an early influence in his career. Starting music at age 6, he joined the children's choir and ministered in various churches. He went to Providence Heights secondary school, where he was known for being an amazing dancer and performer. After graduating, Dammy Krane concentrated on his music and worked hard at his craft, eventually establishing himself as an act to watch.

Inspired by artistes like Fela Kuti, Femi Kuti, Lagbaja, King Sunny Ade, 2face Idibia, D'Banj and Sauce Kid, he started recording songs on his own and performing at various university shows with his ability to merge all genres of music.

He credits his signing to Hypertek Records to a chance meeting with 2face Idibia at a birthday party. He says 2face Idibia had seen him perform and made the decision to sign him.

== Controversies ==
On Friday 2 June 2017, Dammy Krane was arrested in the US reportedly for grand theft, credit card fraud and identity fraud. In the days that followed more allegations were reported that he had used a stolen credit card to book a private jet from the company TapJets while on holiday in Miami. The company had detected the alleged fraud due to discrepancies in the credit card information he had provided. He was released from jail in Miami after meeting his bail conditions, set at $7,500. He pleaded not guilty to the charges and demanded a trial by jury. The singer was assigned an attorney and was billed to appear in court on June 23, 2017. His mother maintained the innocence of her son blaming his troubles on the show promoter that booked his flight ticket. In August 2017, American courts struck out all charges including credit card forgery, armed conspiracy and grand theft filed against him.

Dammy Krane allegedly collided with Davido on Sep 20, 2022 and claimed that Davido owed him an undisclosed sum of money. In a widely shared tweet, he also made sure to include Davido's actual twitter username while urging him to make good on his debt.

== Discography ==
=== Albums ===
- 2010: Uni Girls
- 2011: Pooner
- 2012: Condom Sir
- 2014: The Enterkraner

=== Singles / Songs ===
- 2010 "I Like Girls Feat Piper and Flowsickk"
- 2010 "Uni Girls"
- 2011 "Below"
- 2011 "Pooner"
- 2012 "My Dear"
- 2012 "Shalala" featuring E.L.
- 2012 "Ligali feat. Pasuma"
- 2012 "Condom Sir (Gangnam Style Cover)"
- 2012 "My Dear"
- 2013 "Really Love You (Yvonne Nelson) Leak"
- 2013 "Gratitude"
- 2013 "Xteristics"
- 2013 "Lobatan"
- 2013 "Sabi Dance"
- 2014 "Throw Back"
- 2014 "Amin"
- 2015 "Kayefi" featuring DJ Neptunes
- 2015 "Tomorrow No Dey"
- 2015 "Izzue" featuring Davido
- 2016 "Solo" featuring Olamide
- 2017 "Aye dun"
- 2017 "Gbetiti ft. Davido & Shatta Wale"
- 2017 "Girlfriend "
- 2017 "On point"
- 2017 "Oluwa Bless Me ft. Gweazy & Styllo"
- 2017 "Prayer"
- 2017 "Catch Feeling"
- 2017 "Oluwe"
- 2017 "Credit Card"
- 2017 "Shaku Shaku"
- 2017 "Your Body (Odoo Esisi Mi)"
- 2019 "Pay Me My Money"
- 2019 "Enjoy Lagos"
- 2019 "Trotro ft Kwesi Arthur
- 2019 "Always Say a Prayer (Asap)" featuring Peruzzi
- 2019 "Mood" (Laye) ft Mayorkun
- 2019 "Dokomiwo"
- 2020 "Confess ft Nana Boro"
- 2020 "Wonder"
- 2022 "Every Day" ft. Mohamed Ramadan
- 2023 "Ijo mi"
- 2023 "Abiamo"

== Selected videography ==
Year	Title	Director	Ref
2014	"Amin"	Clarence Peters	
2014	"Sabi Dance"	Clarence Peters	
2015	"Tomorrow No Dey"	Prince Dovlo	
2015	"Izzue"	Unlimited L.A	
2016	"Girlfriend"	Cashboy Films	
2016	"Favour of God (FOG)"	Stanz Visuals	
2017	"Faleela"	Clarence Peters	
2017	"Catch Feelings"	Ola Faronbi	
2017	"Prayer"	Ola Faronbi	
2017	"Solo" (featuring Olamide)	Stanz Visuals	
2017	"Your Body (Odoo Esisi Mi)"	Ola Faronbi	
2018	"Ohema" featuring Stonebwoy and Demarco	ABFAD	
2019	"Amen"	Gbenga Gomes	
2019	"Always Say A Prayer (ASAP) featuring Peruzzi"	Worldstar and Gbenga Gomes	
2019	"Pay me my money"	Gbenga Gomes	
2020	"Wonder"	Worldstar	
