= 2Baba =

Nigerian musician (born 1975)

2Baba MON
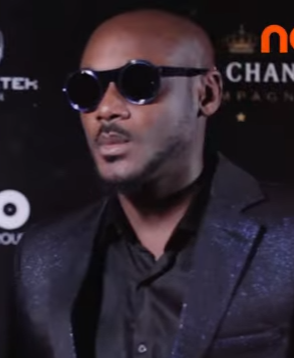
- 2face at the release of his album The Ascension (2014)
- Born: Innocent Ujah Idibia; 18 September 1975 (age 50); Jos, Plateau State, Nigeria
- Other names: Lord Elly; Tubaba; 2Face; Tuface; 2Face Idibia; Tuface Idibia
- Citizenship: Nigerian
- Occupations: Singer; songwriter; record producer; entrepreneur
- Years active: 1994–present
- Spouses: Annie Macaulay (m. 2012; div. 2025) Natasha Osawaru (m. 2025)
- Musical career
- Origin: Lagos, Nigeria
- Genres: Afrobeats; R&B; hip hop; reggae; gospel; afropop
- Instruments: Vocals; Keyboard
- Labels: Hypertek Digital; Kennis Music (former)
- Formerly of: Plantashun Boiz
- Website: www.2face.com

Innocent Ujah Idibia MON (Note: Idibia alongside other Nigerian musicians including Burna Boy was conferred the MON award by President Muhammadu Buhari.) (born 18 September 1975), known by his stage name 2Baba and formerly as 2Face Idibia, is a Nigerian singer-songwriter, record producer and philanthropist known for his solo debut album, Face 2 Face (2004). (Note: The album was received on hit with one of its content "African Queen", which ushered a wave of awareness and reverence for Nigerian music among Africans and diaspora) He is regarded as one of the "most influential" and greatest Afrobeats artists of all time following his contributions to Nigerian pop music in the 2000s.

2Baba won the MTV Europe Music Award for Best African Act in 2005. In 2019, he collaborated with Cobhams Asuquo and Timi Dakolo to release a song raising awareness for children's rights. In 2025, Billboard ranked his song "African Queen" No. 1 on their list of the best Afrobeats songs of all time.

== Early life and education ==
2Baba was born on 18 September 1975, in Jos, Plateau State, Nigeria, from Idoma descent from Benue State in central Nigeria. He studied at Mount Saint Gabriel Secondary School in Makurdi before pursuing Business Administration at the Institute of Management and Technology, Enugu (IMT), located in Enugu State.

Following his growing interest in the music industry, 2Baba discontinued his formal education in pursuit of his music career. By 1996, he had already begun composing music and recording jingles especially at the GB Fan Club at Enugu State Broadcasting Services (ESBS). Operating under the stage name "2Face", (Note: The name was literally coined from "two face") he said that the name was "to demarcate his personal life from business life" though was later changed to "2Baba" in 2016.

== Career ==
While attending The Institute of Management and Technology Enugu (IMT), Idibia began his music career performing alongside Blackface Naija, his secondary school classmate, and Faze, all of whom later formed the trio band, Plantashun Boiz. The band released two albums, Body and Soul (2000) and Sold Out (2003), under Dove Records, a label owned by Nelson Brown. The band members separated in 2004, and 2Baba returned to solo music.

2Baba released his debut solo album, Face 2 Face (2004), which was positively reviewed by music critics and was listed as "the greatest Nigerian debut album of the 21st Century by a solo artist". It was followed by his second album, Grass 2 Grace (2006). After that, he left Kennis Music and established his own record label, Hypertek Digital. In 2009, he released an experimental album, The Unstoppable, with an international edition in 2010. The international edition won two awards at the 2010 SoundCity Music Video Awards.

== Personal life and controversies ==
In 2004, 2Baba's departure from the band "Plantashun Boiz" led to the group's split, sparking a feud with his former bandmates who blamed him for the disbandment. 2Baba and former bandmate Faze traded blame in various tracks on their respective solo albums.

Blackface alleged that 2Baba's performed songs were written by both of them, although the issue was later resolved in court. The hit song "African Queen" became a subject of controversy between 2Baba, his record label Kennis Music, and former bandmate Blackface, who publicly accused him of stealing the song from him, alleging that he wrote the song while they were still a band. Kennis Music eventually agreed to give Blackface writing credits for the song and also agreed to pay him royalties from the proceeds of the song.

On 25 January 2017, 2Baba announced through his Instagram handle that he would be leading a nationwide protest on 5 February 2017; the protest was against policies implemented by the Presidency of Muhammadu Buhari. In an attempt to halt the protest, the administration, through the Lagos State police commissioner Fatai Owoseni, released a statement that the protest was banned in the state, citing concerns that hoodlums would hijack it and cause havoc. However, the statement was rebuffed and ignored publicly, while publicity for the protest continued on social media.

In February 2017, 2Baba released a video stating that he was canceling the protest due to security reasons. Rumors circulated on social media alleging that the administration, through the DSS, had picked him up earlier that day and pressured him to cancel the much-hyped protest, though he later made a series of tweets from his Twitter account to deny the claim.

2Baba was married to Nigerian actress Annie Macaulay-Idibia from 2012-2025 in Lagos, Nigeria. A civil ceremony was held in Dubai on 23 March 2013, and they had two children. On 26 January 2025, he announced his separation and divorce from his wife on Instagram. A few days later, the singer was seen with Natasha Osawaru, a lawmaker in the Edo State House of Assembly.

== Legacy ==
2Baba has received several awards throughout his career, including the MTV Europe Music Award and World Music Award, five The Headies Award for Song of the Year, four Channel O Music Video Awards, and a BET Award. Additionally, he has been honored at the MTV Africa Music Awards, the Music of Black Origin Awards, the Kora Awards, and the 2019 'Afrima Legend Award'. He was inducted into "The Headies Hall of Fame" in 2015 and the 'Music Legends Hall of Fame' in Ghana in 2022.

In May 2016, 2Baba was conferred an honorary Master of Arts in Music at Igbinedion University, Nigeria, and in March 2019, he was named a Fellow of the School of Music at Obafemi Awolowo University. In January 2017, he announced a partnership with the United Nations High Commissioner for Refugees (UNHCR) and made donations for Internally Displaced Persons (IDPs) and returnees. He also launched the "Vote Not Fight" campaign under the Youngstars Foundation and the National Democratic Institute. 2Baba has served as an ambassador for various brands including Guinness in 2005, the National Agency for Food and Drug Administration and Control (NAFDAC) in 2009, the Nigerian Stock Exchange (NSE), Airtel Nigeria, Globacom, Pazino Homes and Gardens, Hennessy artistry season alongside singer Wizkid, in 2014, Oraimo, and was appointed the African ambassador for the Italian liquor manufacturer, Campari in 2016.

The FORTYfied All-Star Tribute Concert, organized by 2Baba to celebrate his 40th birthday and influence in Nigerian music, took place on 20 September 2015, at the Eko Hotel and Suites Convention Centre. Hosted by Basketmouth and sponsored by STAR Lager Beer, the concert garnered widespread acclaim. He is also the founder of the "Buckwyld and Breathless" concert series and the 2Baba Foundation, formerly known as the "2Face Reach Out Foundation".

== Discography ==
Studio albums

- Face 2 Face (2004)
- Grass 2 Grace (2006)
- The Unstoppable (2009)
- The Unstoppable International Edition (2010)
- Away and Beyond (2012)
- The Ascension
- Rewind, Select, Update (2015)
- Warriors (2020)

== See also ==
- List of Nigerian musicians
