= Phantom (producer) =

- Born: Ayobami Olaleye
- Origin: Nigerian
- Genres: Afrobeats, Afropop
- Occupations: Record producer, songwriter
- Years active: 2016–present
- Label: BMG UK

Ayobami Olaleye professionally known as Phantom is a platinum selling, award-winning Afrobeats record producer, singer, and songwriter. In 2020, he became the third Nigerian Afrobeats producer in history to be certified by Syndicat National de l'Édition Phonographique (SNEP) after Burna Boy’s "Ye" became a certified gold record in France. The song earned him an award at 2019 Soundcity MVP Awards Festival, in the African Producer of the Year category, with a nomination at The Headies, in the Producer of the Year category.

On 8 August 2022, he was cited as one of the producers on the TurnTable Nigeria Producer Top 100 chart, and reached number 17.

== Early life and career ==
Ayobami Olaleye was born in Abule Egba, a suburb area of Lagos, and raised in a polygamous family of Oba-Afolabi Olaleye, who was a businessman, and Titi Olaleye, who was a school headmistress. He had his primary education at St John's Primary School and his secondary education at Vetland Grammar School, before proceeding to study Urban and Regional Planning for his tertiary education, where he graduated with a B.Sc in Urban and Regional Planning from the University of Lagos. In 2022, he shared his early musical experience with The Guardian, saying "I grew up in Lagos, listening to African folk music, being influenced by Ebo Taylor, Manu Dibango, and Fela Kuti."

Phantom began creating music in 2007 after his friend introduced him to the music digital software Fruity Loops. He tells Adedayo Laketu of MoreBranches "I started making beats professionally in 2010 and since then its been fulfilling, yet challenging journey". He achieved recognition for his work on Burna Boy's 2018 single "Ye". In 2018, he co-produced the Headies award-winning Best R&B/Pop Album The Mayor of Lagos by Mayorkun. In 2022, he signed a global publishing deal with BMG Rights Management, through BMG UK. His production hits include "Diana" by Fireboy DML & Chris Brown, "Skeletun" by Tekno, "The Benz" by Spotless, "Bolanle" by IVD & Zlatan, and "Sugarcane" by Camidoh.

== Discography ==
=== Singles ===
List of charted singles as a featured artist, with selected chart positions
Artist	Title	Year	Peak chart positions			Certifications	Album
Artist	Title	Year	NG	US	UK	Certifications	Album
Camidoh	"Sugarcane" featuring Phantom	2021	—	—	—		Sugarcane - EP

== Production discography ==
=== Singles produced ===
Title	Year	Album	Release date
"Better Dey Come" (Base One)	2016	Non-album single	
"The Benz" (Spotless)	2018	Non-album single	
"Wole" (Base One)	2018	Non-album single	
"Skeletun" (Tekno)	2019	Rhythms of Zamunda	5 March 2021
"Juliet" (Base One)	2019	Non-album single	
"Bolanle" (IVD, and Zlatan)	2019	TBA	
"Kata" (Tekno)	2020	Non-album single	
"Incase" (Young Jonn)	2020	Non-album single	
"Her Body" (MC Galaxy)	2021	Non-album single	
"Sugarcane" (Camidoh)	2021	Moves: 5 Years of Culture - Afrobeats	10 December 2021
"Diana" (Fireboy DML & Chris Brown)	2022	Playboy	4 August 2022

=== Selected albums/eps produced ===
Artist	Album	Release date	Certifications	Label	Note
Burna Boy	Outside	26 January 2018		Spaceship / Atlantic / Bad Habit	Produced 1 song
Mayorkun	The Mayor of Lagos	16 November 2018		Davido Music Worldwide	Produced 1 song
Various artists	Rhythms of Zamunda	5 March 2021		Def Jam Recordings Africa	Produced 1 song
AcebergTM	Far from Home	16 April 2021		SJW Entertainment	Produced 1 song
Various artists	Moves: 5 Years of Culture: Afrobeats	10 December 2021		Moves Recordings	Produced 1 song
Fireboy DML	Playboy	4 August 2022		YBNL Nation / EMPIRE	Produced 1 song

== Accolades ==
Year	Award	Category	Nominee/work	Result
2019	Soundcity MVP Awards Festival	African Producer of the Year	Himself for "Ye"	Won
2019	The Headies	Producer of the Year	Himself for "Ye"	Nominated
2022	Ghana Nigeria Music Awards Festival USA	Ghana Nigeria Collaborations of the Year	Himself for "Sugarcane"	Pending
