= Citizen of the World (King Perryy album) =

Citizen of the album

Studio album by King Perryy
- Released: 28 April 2021
- Genre: Afro-fusion; R&B; alternative pop; dancehall; Reggae
- Length: 35:00
- Label: DM Records; Continental Music
- Producer: Timaya (also exec.); Teflon Zincfence; Yalababayala; Krisbeatz; Blaisebeatz; DJ Coublon; Chillz Made It; Soularge; TMXO; DJ Khayleb; S’Bling; Omezia; KDaGreat

King Perryy chronology
Citizen of the album (2021)	Continental Playlist (2023)

Singles from Citizen of the World
- 1. "Work N' Grind" Released: March 6, 2019; 2. "YKTFV (You Know The Fvcking Vibes)" Released: August 28, 2020; 3. "My Darlina" Released: February 7, 2020

Citizen of the World is the debut studio album by Nigerian singer and songwriter King Perryy. It was released on April 28, 2021, through DM Records. The album blends Afrofusion, dancehall, and Afropop elements and features guest appearances from Timaya Phyno, Mayorkun, PsychoYP, Kizz Daniel, and Oxlade, among others. it peaked within the top 20 of the Nigeria Apple Music Top 100 Albums chart, where it remained for six consecutive days. The single YKTFV (You Know The Fvcking Vibes) featuring PsychoYP became associated with the rise of Nigerian drill music and was referenced by The Native as part of the Nigerian drill movement's growing influence on contemporary African music culture.

== Background and composition ==
Following his signing to Timaya’s DM Records, King Perryy released several singles, including Man on Duty and Murder, which helped define his “Continental Sound” a blend of African rhythms, Caribbean dancehall, and global pop. Citizen of the World expands on this identity, exploring themes such as love, self-discovery, unity, and ambition. In an interview with The Gleaner King Perryy described the album as a mind state, an identity bringing people together. But before you become a citizen of the world, you have to be aware of yourself, your environment."

== Release and promotion ==
The album was preceded by singles including Work N' Grind, My Darlina and Waist featuring Kizz Daniel. Promotion included several digital campaigns and interviews in Nigerian and international media outlets including Rolling Stone.

== Critical reception ==
Citizen of the World received generally positive reviews from critics. Reviewers praised its polished production, cross-genre diversity, and cohesive sound design. Many highlighted King Perryy's ability to merge Caribbean and African influences into a smooth and modern Afrofusion style. Some critics noted that while the album maintained commercial appeal, it also conveyed introspective and personal messages uncommon in mainstream Afropop releases. Pulse Nigeria describes it as an album that delivers a wide range of moods, emotions and genres and introduction to expansive continental sound, and Culture Custodian describes it as flexing his diversity.

== Track listing ==
Credits adapted from Spotify and album metadata.

Citizen of the World track listing
No.	Title	Writer(s)	Producer(s)	Length
1.	"Intro"	Ikechukwu Anthony Offiah	Romaine Orieliano Arnet	0:26
2.	"African Boy"	Ikechukwu Anthony Offiah, Romaine Orieliano Arnett	Teflon Zincfence	3:38
3.	"Citizen of the World"	Ikechukwu Anthony Offiah, Inetimi Alfred Odon, Efiok Effanga	Yalababayala	2:41
4.	"Yawa"	Ikechukwu Anthony Offiah, Romaine Orieliano Arnett	Teflon Zincfence	2:54
5.	"The Funicator"	Ikechukwu Anthony Offiah, Chris Alvin Sunday	Krisbeatz	2:19
6.	"My Darlina"	Ikechukwu Anthony Offiah, Marcel Akunwata	Blaise beatz	3:00
7.	"Waist" (featuring Kizz Daniel)	Ikechukwu Anthony Offiah, Daniel Oluwatobiloba Anidugbe, Akwuba Charles Ugochukwu	DJ Coublon	2:20
8.	"Work 'N' Grind"	Ikechukwu Anthony Offiah	Chillz Made It	3:22
9.	"Get the Money" (featuring Timaya)	Ikechukwu Anthony Offiah, Inetimi Alfred Odon, Romaine Orieliano Arnet	Teflon Zincfence, KDagreat	2:58
10.	"YKTFV (You Know The Fvcking Vibe)" (featuring PsychoYP)	Ikechukwu Anthony Offiah, Nicholas Ihua-Maduenyi, Ebuka Ntamere	RicoRunDat	3:28
11.	"Beep Beep (Skit)"	Ikechukwu Anthony Offiah, Helen Abraham		0:23
12.	"Let Me Love" (featuring Oxlade)	Ikechukwu Anthony Offiah, Ikuforiji Olaitan Abdulrahman	S’Bling	3:19
13.	"Big Man Cruise" (featuring Mayorkun)	Ikechukwu Anthony Offiah, Adewale Mayowa Emmanuel	Beat By Que	3:07
14.	"Crème de la Crème"	Ikechukwu Anthony Offiah	Omezia	2:34
15.	"Jati Jati"	Ikechukwu Anthony Offiah, Akpevwe Waka-Otenuda	DJ Khayleb	2:36
16.	"Paulina" (featuring Phyno)	Ikechukwu Anthony Offiah, Chibuzor Nelson Azubuike, Marcell Akunwata	Soularge, Blaise Beatz	3:03
17.	"Prayer"	Ikechukwu Anthony Offiah, Emmanuel Oluwatimilehin Aladeloba	TMXO	2:48
Total length:				35:31

== Personnel ==
Credits adapted from Spotify and album metadata.

=== Performers ===
- King Perryy – primary artist, vocals
- Kizz Daniel – featured artist
- Timaya – featured artist
- PsychoYP – featured artist
- Oxlade – featured artist
- Mayorkun – featured artist
- Phyno – featured artist

=== Production ===
- Teflon Zincfence - producer
- Yalababayala - producer
- Krizbeatz - producer
- Blaisebeatz - producer
- DJ Coublon - producer
- Chillz Made It - producer
- Soularge - producer
- TMXO - producer
- DJ Khayleb - producer
- S’Bling - producer
- Omezia - producer
- KDaGreat - producer

=== Management and distribution ===
- DM Records – record label
- Jones Worldwide – distribution and marketing

== Release history ==
Region	Date	Format	Label
Various	28 April 2021	Digital download	DM Records
Nigeria	28 April 2021	Digital download	DM Records
