= Continental Playlist =

EP by King Perryy
- Released: 15 February 2023
- Recorded: 2023
- Genre: Afrobeats; neo soul; Dancehall; afropop
- Length: 18:00
- Label: Continental Music
- Producer: Tuzy; Smean; Yalabalaya; 1da Banton; Dean

King Perryy chronology
Citizen of the World (2021)	Continental Playlist (2023)	Niggas from the South (2024)

Singles from Continental Playlist
- 1. "Turkey Nla" Released: 29 September 2022; 2. "Tight Condition" Released: 8 December 20222

Continental Playlist is the debut extended play by Nigerian singer-songwriter King Perryy, released on 15 February 2023 by Continental Music under exclusive licence to Engage, a division of MAD solutions INC. with guest features from Tekno, 1da Banton, Victony, and Ria Sean. The EP received generally favorable reviews from critics and peaked at number 10 on the Sweden Apple Music chart and 46 on the France iTunes chart.

== Background and release ==
Perryy's music career gained momentum in 2018 with the release of his breakout single 'Man on Duty' featuring Timaya, Building on his newfound popularity affiliating with Dem Mama records owned by Timaya, In December 2019 he released his follow up single 'Work N Grind' and 'Murder' featuring Teni. On April 28, 2021, he released his debut studio album titled "Citizen Of The World" which features Phyno, Mayorkun, Kizz Daniel, Timaya, PsychoYP and Oxlade On 15 February 2023 He released Continental Playlist in 2023.

== Composition ==
The 7-track EP features a diverse range of songs. The first track, "On God" serving as the lead single, this track opens the project with a heartfelt message. King Perryy reflects on his journey, acknowledging the central role of God in his life and career. On Turkey Nla (Remix) featuring Tekno the song might share the same title as one of Wande Coal's songs, yet the message and style are different and the removal of Fela Kuti sample on the original where the last part of the song explore Amapiano with the skittering log drum serving as the accompaniment to the drums, kick, and baseline. On "Tight Condition" He shared a A punchy duet alongside singer Victony. "Oh No" features rolling drums, kicks, and baseline. Lyrically, it finds Perryy reflecting his transactional relationship on a girl. On ”Flamingo" featuring Ria Sean, this bouncy, R&B-tinged track mixes Dancehall vibes with a Nigerian bounce and Hawaiian guitar melodies while No Stress" is a blend of Dancehall and Highlife, this song borrows elements from 20th-century palm wine music. Repurposing lyrics from King Perryy's earlier hit "Yawa", "Denge" closing the EP, this dance-centric track features 1da Banton, who also serves as its producer. The rhythm draws inspiration from Timaya's “Sanko” and Runtown's “Body Riddim.” Sparse lyrics allow the energetic production to shine, with Banton's solemn verse adding a contrasting depth.

== Critical reception ==
Professional ratings
Review scores
Source	Rating
Pulse Nigeria	6.8/10
Afrocritic	6/10

Adeayo Adebiyi of Pulse Nigeria rated the extended play 6.8/10, praising his ability to infuse multiple sounds, in his words he said that King Perryy blends his signature Dancehall style with mainstream elements, aiming to expand his reach while preserving his unique identity in the evolving Nigerian music scene.

Emmanuel Daraloye of Afrocritic rated the project 6/10 saying that the production on Continental Playlist is exceptional, blending diverse styles and cultures, reflecting an artist attuned to global trends. However, the collaborations often overshadow King Perryy's performances, a balance that could be refined in future projects.

== Track listing ==
Continental Playlist track listing
No.	Title	Writer(s)	Producer(s)	Length
1.	"On God"	Ikechukwu Anthony Offiah	Tuzi Beats	2:11
2.	"Turkey Nla (Remix)" (featuring Tekno)	Ikechukwu Anthony Offiah; Augustine Miles Kelechi Okechukwu	Smeez & Dean	3:00
3.	"Tight Condition" (featuring Victony)	Ikechukwu Anthony Offiah; Anthony Ebuka Victor	Yalababayala	2:43
4.	"Oh No"	Ikechukwu Anthony Offiah	Tuzi Beats	2:17
5.	"Flamingo" (featuring Ria Sean)	Ikechukwu Anthony Offiah; Gloria Asene Enebi	Randay Beats	2:17
6.	"No Stress"	Ikechukwu Anthony Offiah	Tuzi Beats	3:05
7.	"Denge" (featuring 1da Banton)	Ikechukwu Anthony Offiah; Godson Ominibie Epelle	1da Banton	2:38
Total length:				19:00

== Release history ==
Region	Date	Format	Version	Label
Various	15 February 2023	streaming, digital download, CD	Standard	Continental Music
