= Sugarcane (Camidoh song) =

Song by Camidoh

Single by Camidoh featuring Phantom
- Released: 19 November 2021
- Genre: Afropop
- Length: 2:36
- Label: Grind Don't Stop; MOVES; Crux Global
- Songwriters: Raphael Camidoh Kofi Attachie; Ayobami Olaleye
- Producer: Phantom

Camidoh singles chronology
"Dance with You" (2021)	"Sugarcane" (2021)	"Fuego (Remix)" (2022)

"Sugarcane (remix)"

Single by Camidoh featuring Mayorkun, King Promise, and Darkoo
- Released: 8 April 2022
- Genre: Afropop
- Length: 4:11
- Label: Grind Don't Stop Records; MOVES; Crux Global
- Songwriters: Raphael Camidoh Kofi Attachie; Adewale Mayowa Emmanuel; Gregory Bortey Newman; Oluwafisayo Isa
- Producer: Phantom

Mayorkun singles chronology
"Holy Father" (2021)	"Sugarcane (remix)" (2022)	"There She Go (Jack Sparrow)" (2022)

Darkoo singles chronology
"Always" (2022)	"Sugarcane (remix)" (2022)	"There She Go (Jack Sparrow)" (2022)

"Sugarcane" is a song by Ghanaian singer and songwriter Camidoh, featuring Nigerian record producer Phantom, who also produced the song. It was released in 29 November 2021 by Grind Don't Stop Records and through Crux Global and MOVES Recordings. A remix with Mayorkun, King Promise, and Darkoo, was released in 2022. Following the remix's release, the song gained popularity across TikTok.

The remix debuted at number 16 on Nigeria's TurnTable Top 50 chart on 9 May 2022, and reached number 4 on 18 May. It also debuted at number 20 on the UK Afrobeats Singles Chart on 1 May, and reached number 12 on 8 May. It debuted at number 18 on the Billboard U.S. Afrobeats Songs chart on the week of May 21. He performed a live version of Sugarcane (remix) on Glitch Africa, on 23 May 2022. Ademoye Afeez of NotJustOk called its performance "thrilling".

== Background ==
"Sugarcane" was released on 19 November 2021, and produced by Phantom. A music video for "Sugarcane" was released on 17 February 2022, it was directed by Jwillz. The video is Camidoh's most viewed video with over 2.1 million YouTube streams as of May 2022. The song was accomplished with a remix with Nigerian singer Mayorkun, and British rapper Darkoo, and feature's Ghanaian singer King Promise, released on 8 April 2022 by Grind Don't Stop Records, through Crux Global, and MOVES Recordings.

== Impact ==
The original version featuring the Nigerian record producer Phantom, was endorsed by American singer Akon, during a question-and-answer session on Twitter Spaces with social media influencer, KalyJay, on Thursday, 24 February 2022, He called the song "massive" and stated that it is among his top ten songs that he plays daily.

=== Dance routine ===
A dance routine for the song was created by TikToker Sabrina, which has been used in several videos with the hashtag #Sugarcanechallenge. The dance routine was endorsed by other content creators, and choreographers, including Incredible Zigi, who also participated in the dance routine. As of 31 May 2021, the TikTok challenge has received 38.5M TikTok views.

== Accolades ==
Awards and nominations for "Sugarcane"
Year	Organization	Award	Result	Ref.
2022	Vodafone Ghana Music Awards	Best Afrobeats Song	Nominated	
2022	Ghana Nigeria Music Awards Festival USA	Ghana Nigeria Collaborations of the Year	Pending	
2022	Ghana Nigeria Music Awards Festival USA	Afrobeats Song of the Year	Pending	
2023	Soundcity MVP Awards Festival	Song of the Year	Nominated	
2023	Soundcity MVP Awards Festival	Video of the Year	Nominated	
2023	Soundcity MVP Awards Festival	Best Collaboration	Nominated	
2023	Soundcity MVP Awards Festival	Listener's Choice	Nominated	
2023	Soundcity MVP Awards Festival	Viewer's Choice	Nominated	

== Commercial performance ==
On 16 February 2022, "Sugarcane" debuted on Adom Airplay Chart, at number 2. As of 23 February 2022, "Sugarcane" had reached number 2 on Citi Top 10 Countdown on Citi FM and Citi Countdown show on Citi TV, airplay show. On 14 May 2022, it was ranked at number 2 on Nigerian newspaper TheCable's weekly TCL Radio Picks chart. "Sugarcane" became Camidoh's most-streamed song on all digital streaming platforms. The remix became Ghana's second entry on the Spotify Nigeria chart at number 1. "Sugarcane (remix)" reached number one on Apple Music Top 100 Nigeria chart. On 1 May 2022, it debuted at number 20 on the UK Afrobeats Singles chart.

On 3 May 2022, it debuted at number 44 on the TurnTable Top 50 Streaming Songs chart. On 8 May 2022, it debuted at number 18 on the Billboard U.S. Afrobeats Songs chart. On 9 May 2022, it debuted at number 16 on Nigeria TurnTable Top 50 chart. On 17 May 2022, it debuted at number 14 on the TurnTable Top 50 Airplay. "Sugarcane" has received 8.6 million Boomplay streams as of 31 May 2022, and "Sugarcane (remix)" has received 13.5 million Boomplay streams as of 31 May 2022.

== Charts ==
=== Weekly charts ===
Chart performance for "Sugarcane (Remix)"
Chart (2022)	Peak position
Nigeria (TurnTable Top 100)	6
Nigeria (TurnTable Top 50)	4
Nigeria Top 50 Streaming Songs (TurnTable)	4
Nigeria Top 50 Airplay (TurnTable)	12
Nigeria Top International Songs (TurnTable)	1
US Afrobeats Songs (Billboard)	18
UK Afrobeats (OCC)	3

=== Year-end charts ===
2022 year-end chart performance for "Sugarcane" remix
Chart (2022)	Position
US Afrobeats Songs (Billboard)	15

== Release history ==
Release history for "Sugarcane"
Region	Date	Version	Format	Label	Ref.
Various	19 November 2021	Original	Digital download; streaming	Grind Don't Stop; Crux Global; MOVES	
Various	8 April 2022	Remix	Digital download; streaming	Grind Don't Stop; Crux Global; MOVES	

== Certifications ==
Certifications for "Sugarcane" remix
Region	Certification	Certified units/sales
Nigeria (TCSN)	Platinum	100,000^{‡}
^{‡} Sales+streaming figures based on certification alone.
