= Camidoh =

Ghanaian musician

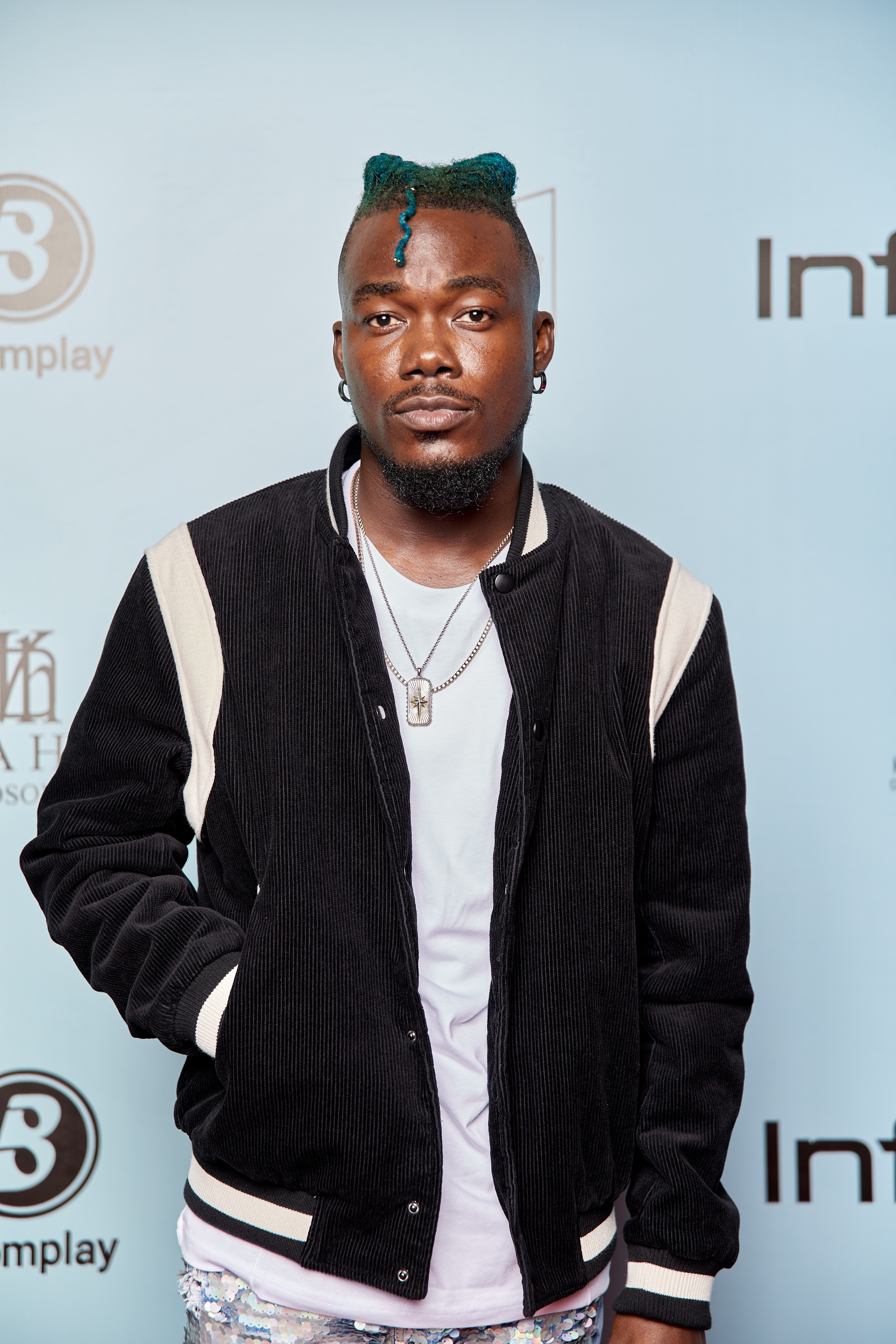

Background information
- Born: Raphael Camidoh Kofi Attachie; 21 January 1994 (age 32); Aflao, Ghana
- Genres: Afrobeat, Afropop
- Occupations: Musician, songwriter
- Years active: 2018–present
- Label: GRIND DONT STOP RECORDS

Raphael Camidoh Kofi Attachie (born 21 January 1994) known by his stage name Camidoh is an Afropop, R&B and Afrobeats singer and songwriter from Aflao in the Volta Region of Ghana.

== Early life and education ==
Camidoh was born in Aflao in the Volta Region of Ghana and raised by a single mother in Ho, the capital of Volta Region, Ghana. From 2008 to 2012 Camidoh obtained his secondary education from Bishop Herman College, in Kpando Kpando Municipal District where he majored in General Arts. He furthered his education at the University of Professional Studies in Accra, Ghana, graduating with Bachelor of Science degree in Marketing.

== Career ==
In 2018 Camidoh was signed by Grind Don't Stop Records. In that same year, Camidoh released his first single titled For My Lover which featured Darkovibes. He subsequently released The Best which featured Kelvyn Boy and Available featuring Eugy. In 2021, he released a single which featured BET award nominee Kwesi Arthur titled Dance With You. In 2020, he released six–track EP titled Contingency Plan (C.P.).

In March 2021 Camidoh performed at the Entertainment Achievement Awards organized by Citi TV. His extended play, Contingency Plan (C.P.) was nominated for the Album of the Year. After his performance, earned him admiration from IMANI chief executive officer, Franklin Cudjoe who dashed him $500.

He rose to prominence in between 2021 and 2022, when he released his single Sugarcane in December 2021. The song began to trend more after the Ghanaian TikTok video creators community used the song in their videos, serving as a way of promoting the song online. The song was number 5 on Shazam's top 200 most searched Afropop songs. On 8 April 2022, he released a remix of the song featuring King Promise, Nigerian artiste Mayorkun and British rapper Darkoo. In the first week of May, barely a month after its release, the collaboration peaked at Number 1 on Nigeria's Top 100 Music Chart on Apple Music.

He scored a 'Viewer's Choice: Best New International Act' nomination at the 2023 Black Entertainment Television Awards. He is competing for the award against the likes of Werenoi (France), FLO (UK), Libianca (Cameroon), Raye (UK), Maureen (France), MC Ryan SP (Brazil), Paris Cooper (South Africa) and Asake (Nigeria).

== Artistry and musical influences ==
Prior to starting his music career, Camidoh came across music from Senegalese-American artist Akon on music streaming website YouTube when he was in an internet café with his cousin. He was inspired to go into music and due to that he cites Akon as his musical inspiration and

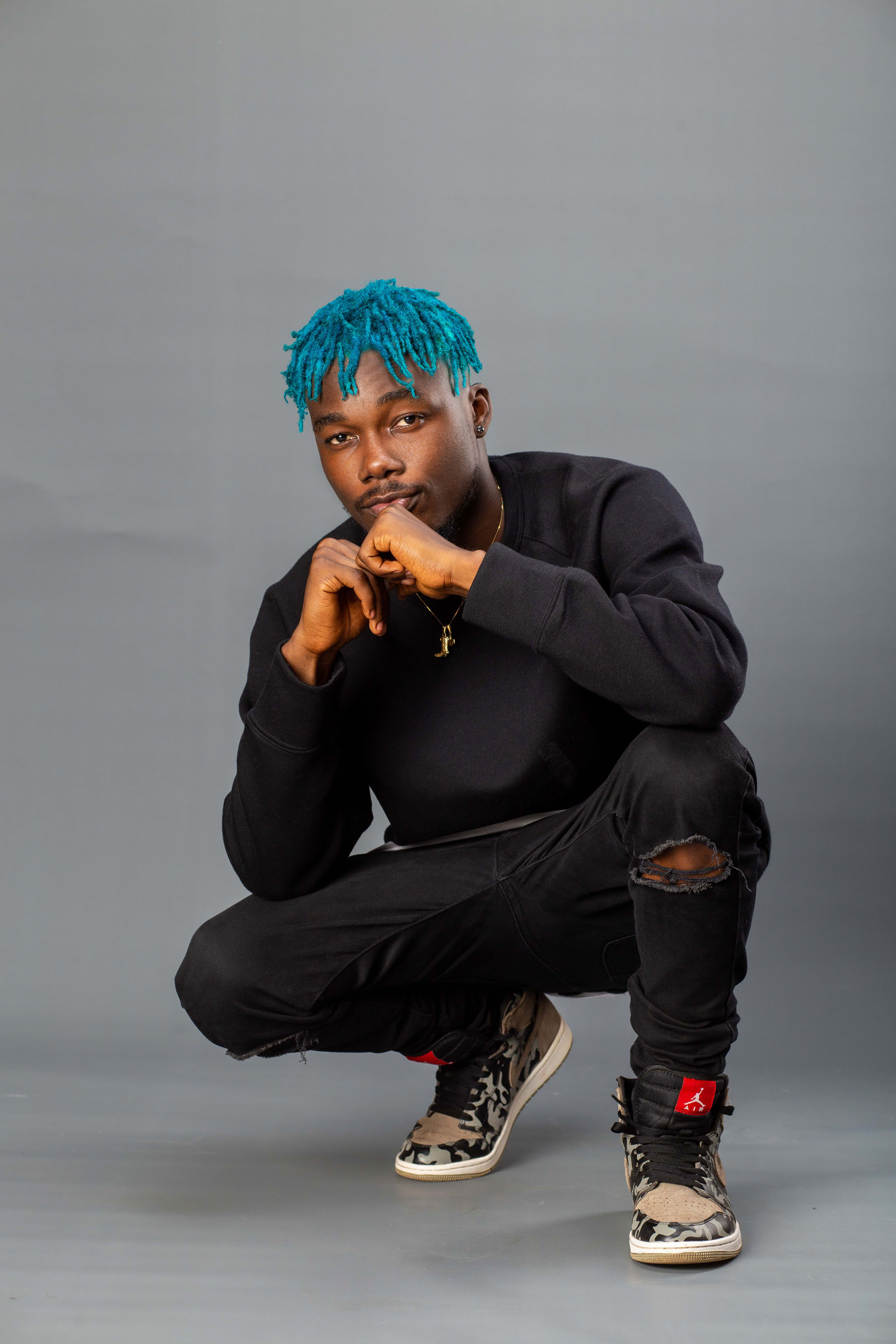
Camidoh

influence.

In February 2022, in a Twitter Space interview with Ghanaian social media influencer KalyJay, Akon mentioned "I have heard that song [Sugarcane]. That record is massive,"..."I have that record. It is one of my top ten records that I play every day."

== Discography ==
=== Selected singles ===
- For My Lover ft. Darkovibes (2018)
- The Best ft. Kelvyn Boy (2019)
- TikTok (Available) ft. Eugy (2020)
- Maria (2020)
- Dance With You ft. Kwesi Arthur (2021)
- Sugarcane ft. Phantom (2021)
- Sugarcane (Remix) (ft. King Promise, Mayorkun & Darkoo) (2022)
- Amina (2026)

=== Album and EP ===
- Contingency Plan (C.P.) 2020
- A LIFETIME IS NOT ENOUGH (2023) with GDS
- L.I.T.A (2023)

== Awards and nominations ==
Year	Ceremony	Award	Nominated work	Result	Ref
2023	BET Awards	Viewer's Choice: Best New International Act	Himself	Nominated	
2023	BET Awards	Vodafone Ghana Music Awards	International Collaboration Act	Himself	Won
2023	Afrobeat Song of the Year	Vodafone Ghana Music Awards	Himself	Won	
2022	Vodafone Ghana Music Awards	Afrobeats/Afropop Artiste of the Year	Himself	Nominated	
2022	Vodafone Ghana Music Awards	International Collaboration	Himself	Won	
2022	Vodafone Ghana Music Awards	Best Afrobeats Song	Sugar Cane ft. Phantom	Nominated	
2022	3Music Awards	Afrobeats/Afropop Song of the Year	Available ft. Eugy	Nominated	
2022	3Music Awards	Digital Act of the Year	Himself	Nominated	
2022	3Music Awards	Male Vocalist of the Year	Available (remix) Himself	Nominated	
2022	Ghana Nigeria Music Awards Festival USA	Afrobeats Song of the Year	"Sugarcane" ft. Phantom	Pending	
2022	Ghana Nigeria Music Awards Festival USA	Ghana Nigeria Collaborations of the Year	"Sugarcane" ft. Phantom	Pending	
2021	Entertainment Achievement Awards	Album of the Year	Contingency Plan (C.P.)	Nominated	
