= Back in Office =

Studio album by Mayorkun
- Released: 29 October 2021
- Genres: R&B; Afro-pop; Afrobeats; Amapiano; highlife
- Length: 34:57
- Label: Sony Music West Africa
- Producers: Fresh VDM; Speroach Beatz; Telz; Clemzy; Quebeat; Semzi; Junior Taurus; Phantom; Tempoe; DJ Maphorisa; Kabza de Small

Mayorkun chronology
The Mayor of Lagos (2018)	Back in Office (2021)	Love.. For Free (2023)

Singles from Back in Office
- 1. "Let Me Know" Released: 20 August 2021; 2. "Back in Office" Released: 1 October 2021; 3. "Holy Father" Released: 27 October 2021

Back in Office is the second studio album by Nigerian singer Mayorkun. It was released on 29 October 2021 through Sony Music West Africa. The album features guest appearances from Flavour, DJ Maphorisa, Kabza de Small, Joeboy, Gyakie, and Victony. Production was handled by Fresh VDM, Speroach Beatz, Telz, Clemzy, Quebeat, Semzi, Junior Taurus, Phantom, Tempoe, DJ Maphorisa, and Kabza de Small. It serves as a follow-up to Mayorkun's debut, The Mayor of Lagos (2018).

== Background and recording ==
Following the release of the singles "Geng", "Of Lagos", and "Betty Butter" during the COVID-19 pandemic, Mayorkun took a break from releasing music and began focusing on his second studio album Back in Office, which followed his debut album, The Mayor of Lagos (2018). In an interview with OkayAfrica, he said that although he had been recording material for a new album since January 2020, many of the songs did not fit the project's intended theme and were discarded, and that the album's official recording process began about eight months before its release.

Mayorkun said that Back in Office expressed his growth as an artist, citing his willingness to experiment with different sounds. He also discussed the recording of "Feel Am", stating that he sought the involvement of Flavour on the song and worked with Zoro and Chike to learn and pronounce Igbo phrases used in his lyrics. He further stated that some tracks, including "Piece of Mind", were inspired by personal experiences and challenges he faced during the period leading up to the album's release. He announced the album's release through his Instagram page on 7 October 2021. The album's official track listing was revealed on 23 October 2021.

== Singles ==
Back in Office's lead single "Let Me Know" was released on 20 August 2021 and was produced by Clemzy. The track served as his first solo release in nine months at the time. "Let Me Know" was released under Sony Music West Africa instead of Davido Music Worldwide (DMW), his previous label, which left fans to speculate if Mayorkun was leaving DMW. The title track, "Back in Office", was released as the album's second single on 1 October 2021.

It marked Mayorkun's first official single with Sony Music after leaving DMW. Produced by Speroach Beatz, the track combines elements of afropop and amapiano, with vocals, saxophone, and percussion-driven instrumentation. Its official music video, filmed on the streets of Lagos Island, portrays Mayorkun as a mayor returning to office and being greeted by enthusiastic crowds. The third and final single off the album, "Holy Father", features Victony, and was released on 27 October 2021. Produced by Semzi, its TG Omori-directed sci-fi-themed music video was released on 27 January 2022.

== Critical reception ==
Professional ratings
Review scores
Source	Rating
tooXclusive	6.5/10
The Native	6.9/10
Afrocritik	7/10
Pulse Nigeria	7.3/10

Motolani Alake of Pulse Nigeria commended Back in Office for its "growth" and "ambition", noting that while some songs were "let down by the imperfect execution", it is "an improvement on The Mayor of Lagos" and "reflects growth". He gave it a rating of 7.3 out of 10. In a review for Afrocritik, Emmanuel Daraloye said that the album showed Mayorkun's growth and change in sound from his debut, calling it "a paradigm shift from The Mayor of Lagos" and praising its well-written lyrics and wider range of topics. He rated it a 7 out of 10.

Dennis Peter, reviewing for the Native, said that the album "does a notable job of reconciling what makes Mayorkun a hit-maker and ideals of a full-length," adding that it "doesn't break any moulds" but showed "some range" while keeping its sound familiar. He rated it a 6.9 out of 10 and concluded that "He's a pop star, and pop stars don't really need great albums to remain on top." Bisi-Taiwo Chukwumerije of tooXclusive described Back in Office as an "intentional project", praising Mayorkun's versatility, wordplay and "melodic brilliance", as well as its focus on African sounds and "quality production". He concluded that it was "a guaranteed success for Mayorkun and everyone on his team" and ratied it 6.5 out of 10.

== Track listing ==
Back in Office track listing
No.	Title	Writer(s)	Producer(s)	Length
1.	"Soldier Boy"	Adewale Emmanuel	Fresh VDM	2:25
2.	"Back in Office"	Emmanuel	Speroach Beatz	3:11
3.	"Freedom"	Emmanuel	Telz	2:58
4.	"Let Me Know"	Emmanuel	Clemzy	2:54
5.	"Desire" (featuring Gyakie)	Emmanuel; Jackline Acheampong	Quebeat	2:18
6.	"No Strings Attached" (featuring Joeboy)	Emmanuel; Joseph Akinfenwa-Donus	Fresh VDM	2:36
7.	"Holy Father" (featuring Victony)	Emmanuel; Anthony Victor	Semzi	3:04
8.	"Nakupenda"	Emmanuel	Fresh VDM; Junior Taurus	2:56
9.	"Feel Am" (featuring Flavour)	Emmanuel; Chinedu Okoli	Phantom	3:02
10.	"Piece of Mind"	Emmanuel	Tempoe	2:32
11.	"Jay Jay" (featuring DJ Maphorisa and Kabza de Small)	Emmanuel; Themba Sekowe	DJ Maphorisa; Kabza de Small	5:31
12.	"Oluwa"	Emmanuel	Fresh VDM	1:28
Total length:				34:57

=== Personnel ===
Credits adapted from liner notes.

- Adewale Mayowa Emmanuel — composition, executive producer
- Adewale Ayobami Samuel — composition, lyricist, A&R
- Jackline Acheampong — composition
- Joseph Akinwale Akinfenwa-Donus — composition
- Emmanuel Oluwashina Bello — composition, production
- Anthony Ebuka Victor — composition
- Adewale Mayowa Emmanuel — composition
- Jerry Jurbe Jethro — composition
- Chinedu Izuchukwu Okoli — composition
- Hadiza Blell-Olo — composition, additional vocals
- Themba Sonnyboy Sekowe — composition, production, additional vocals
- Speroach Beatz — production
- Telz — production
- Clemzy — production
- Quebeat — production
- Semzi — production
- Junior Taurus — production
- Phantom — production
- Tempoe — production
- Kabza de Small — production
- Stephen "STG" Abenga — engineering
- Hoodini — engineering
- Udoka "Selebobo" Oku — engineering
- 121 Selah — additional vocals
- Owoh Chiamobi Abarikwu Samfrank — lyricist, management
- Abolaji Collins Kuye - guitar
- Omogunwa Emmanuel — sax
- Roderick Ejuetami — photography
- Deji Sokunbi — art and design
- Daniel Momoh — creative direction
- David Edogame — A&R

== Release history ==
Release history and formats for Back in Office
Region	Date	Format	Label
Various	29 October 2021	Streaming; digital download	Sony Music West Africa
