= King Perryy =

Nigerian singer and songwriter

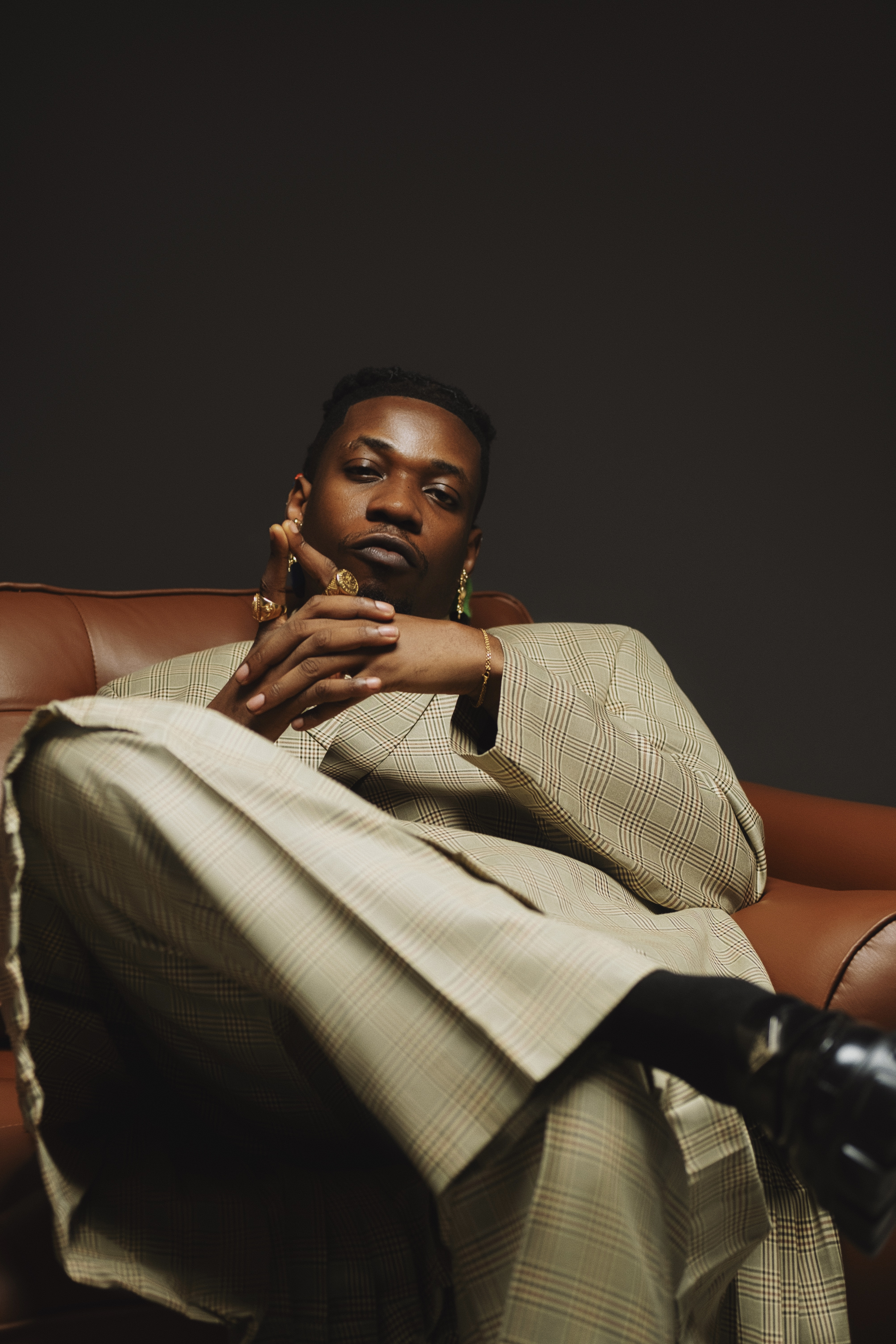

Background information
- Also known as: King Perryy
- Born: Ikechukwu Anthony Offiah; 28 April 1997 (age 29); Port Harcourt, Rivers State, Nigeria
- Genre: Afrofusion
- Occupations: Singer; songwriter
- Instrument: Keyboard
- Years active: 2018–present
- Labels: Continental Music; Dem Mama Records (Affiliate)

Ikechukwu Anthony Offiah (born 28 April 1997), professionally known as King Perryy, is a Nigerian afrofusion singer and songwriter. He rose to prominence with the single "Man on Duty" featuring Timaya which was released in 2018 under Timaya's label DM Records.He's noted for his experimentation across multiple African and global sounds. In 2020, his single “YKTFV (You Know The Fvcking Vibes)” featuring PsychoYP became associated with the rise of Nigerian drill music and was referenced by The Native as part of the Nigeria drill movement’s growing influence on contemporary African music culture.

== Early life ==
Offiah was born on 28 April 1997 in Port Harcourt, Rivers State, Nigeria. He originally hails from Ezeagu, Enugu State. Nigeria. He attended primary and secondary school education in the Port Harcourt region and later received a degree in Project Management at the Federal University of Technology Owerri in Imo State.

== Career ==
=== 2014–2017: Early career beginnings ===
King Perryy began his music career in 2014 with the release of his debut single, “Walakolombo,” which featured guitar contributions from Fiokee. During the early stages of his career, he gained industry exposure after being introduced to Timaya, who later became an important influence in his musical journey.

=== 2018–2019: Dem Mama Records and breakthrough recognition ===
In 2018, King Perryy became associated with Dem Mama Records, the record label founded by Timaya. In December 2018, he released the collaborative single “Kom Kom” alongside Timaya and Patoranking.

On 26 February 2019, King Perryy released two new singles “Work N Grind,” and “Murder” featuring Teni, which contributed to his growing popularity within the Afrobeats and dancehall scene.“Murder” peaked on the top ten of the MTV Base West Africa countdown chart.

=== 2020–2021: Citizen Of The World and drill experimentation ===
In 2020, King Perryy expanded his sound by experimenting with drill music on the single “YKTFV (You Know The Fvcking Vibes)” featuring PsychoYP. Speaking on the record, he explained that the song was inspired by late American rapper Pop Smoke.

His exploration of drill music later aligned with the growing Abuja drill movement, which was documented by The Native music magazine as part of the wider evolution of Nigerian drill culture. The publication referenced King Perryy and PsychoYP’s “YKTFV” as one of the records that contributed to the nationwide popularity of drill-inspired music in Nigeria.

On April 28, 2021, King Perryy released his debut studio album, Citizen of the World. The album featured guest appearances from Phyno, Mayorkun, Kizz Daniel, Timaya, PsychoYP and Oxlade. The project incorporated Afrobeats, dancehall, reggae and drill influences, further establishing his continental sound.

On April 6 2022, He released a single titled "Go German" featuring Bella Shmurda and Backroad Gee, he received a nomination for Reggae Artist of the Year at the Ghana-Nigeria Music Awards Festival. Later that year, he released a compilation project titled African Boy under his independent imprint, Continental Music.

=== Public commentary and social issues ===
Following the release of his debut album Citizen of the World in 2021, King Perryy spoke about political and social conditions in Nigeria during interviews surrounding the Blocking of Twitter in Nigeria. In an interview with Rolling Stone, he criticized the Nigerian government’s response to youth protests and discussed the economic realities facing young Nigerians stating that despite the international growth of the genre, many social and economic issues in the country remained unresolved.

=== 2023: Continental Playlist & Denge ===
In 2023, King Perryy released the EP Continental Playlist. The project included collaborations with Tekno, 1da Banton, Victony and Ria Sean. The EP explored Afrobeats, dancehall, reggae, drill and pop influences. One of the songs from the project, “Tight Condition” featuring Victony, surpassed one million streams on Spotify in April 2023,becoming one of King Perryy’s notable streaming milestones. The song’s success further strengthened the commercial reception of Continental Playlist and highlighted his growing presence in the Afro-fusion scene.

Prior to the releases, King Perryy had introduced the original version of “Denge” featuring 1da Banton on his 2023 EP Continental Playlist. The song later evolved into a cross-African collaboration series. In 2024, he released “Denge II” featuring Runtown and Shatta Wale, official video shot in Ghana by TG Omori, expanding the record’s reach across West Africa.

On February 21, 2024, King Perryy released “Denge 3.0”, described as the East African version of the song, featuring Marioo, Joshua Baraka and Savara. The release formed part of his pan-African musical approach, incorporating artists from different regions of the continent.

=== 2024–present: Niggas From The South and Continental Rave ===
In 2024, King Perryy released the single “Confirm Parole” featuring Ajebo Hustlers and Dandizzy. He also released “Gbege” featuring PsychoYP and Kaestyle. Later that year, he released the EP Niggas From The South, a project influenced by southern Nigerian street culture, dancehall, Afrobeats and hip-hop sounds.

In 2025, King Perryy released the EP Continental Rave, a six-track project centered around Afrotech, EDM and rave-inspired sounds. The project featured tracks such as “No You Can’t Be Sober,” “Ogogoro,” “Feeling,”and “Tulemon” featuring Active Boy. The EP was described as an exploration of African rave culture and nightlife, blending Afrobeats melodies with electronic and dance influences by The Lagos Review.

== Discography ==
=== Albums ===
- Citizen of the World

=== EP ===
- Continental Playlist (2023)
- Denge 6.0 (2024)
- Niggas From The South (2024)
- Continental Rave (2025)

=== Selected singles ===
As lead artist
Year	Title	Album
2014	"Walakolombo"	Non-album single
2018	"Eastern Baby"	Non-album single
2018	"Man On Duty"	Non-album single
2019	"Work 'N' Grind"	Citizen of the World
2019	"Murder" feat. Teni	Non-album single
2020	"My Darlina"	Non-album single
2020	"Jigga"	Non-album single
2020	"YKTFV (You Know The Fvcking Vibe)”	Citizen of the World
2020	"Waist" feat. Kizz Daniel	Citizen of the World
2021	"The Funicator"	Non-album single
2022	"Go German" feat. Bella Shmurda & BackRoad Gee	Non-album single
2022	"Turkey Nla"	Non-album single
2022	"Turkey Nla Remix"	Non-album single
2023	”On God"	Non-album single
2023	"Beast Of Our Nation" feat. Wizard Chan & Tuzi	Non-album single
2023	"Denge II” feat. Shatta Wale & Runtown	Denge 6.0
2024	"Denge 3.0"	Denge 6.0
As featured artist
Year	Title	Album
2019	"Tanana" (Ajebo Hustlers) feat. King Perryy	Non-album single
2019	"Kpokpokpo" (Triqa Blu) feat. King Perryy	Non-album single
2020	"Dirty Dancer" (Teflon Zincfence) feat. King Perryy	Non-album single
2020	"My Girl" (E Kelly) feat. King Perryy	Non-album single
2022	"Whenever" (Ugoccie) feat. King Perryy	Non-album single
2023	"Stand Attention" (PsychoYP) feat. King Perryy	Osapa London - Deluxe

== Awards and nominations ==
Year	Event	Prize	Recipient	Result
2022	Ghana-Nigeria Music Awards Festival	Reggae Artist Of The Year	Himself	Nominated
