= Gladiator (Timaya album) =

GLADIATOR

Studio album by Timaya
- Released: 15 August 2024
- Recorded: 2022–2024
- Genre: Afropop
- Length: 35:31
- Labels: Dem Mama; Empire
- Producers: Young D; Scarlet Sounds; Michon; Hylander; Semzi; Yung Alpha; Jonny Blaze; Xtreme the Producer; Masterkraft; Spotless

Timaya chronology
Gratitude (2020)	GLADIATOR (2024)

Singles from GLADIATOR
- 1. "Get My Money Right" Released: 30 June 2022; 2. "Sweet Us" Released: 11 November 2022; 3. "Dey Your Dey" Released: 2 February 2024; 4. "In My Head" Released: 15 April 2024

Gladiator (stylized in all caps) is the eighth studio album by Nigerian afro pop artist Timaya. It was released on 15 August 2024, by Dem Mama Records and Empire. The album features guest appearances from Alpha P, Tiwa Savage, Olamide, Phyno, Konshens, Eugy and Mr. Killa. The album featured producers such as Masterkraft, Spotless, Yung Alpha, Jonny Blaze, Semzi, Young D, Michon, Hylander, Scarlet Sounds, Michon and Xtreme the Producer. Gladiator houses the singles "Get My Money Right", "Sweet Us", "Dey Your Dey", and "In My Head". The album serves as a follow-up to Gratitude (2020).

== Background ==
The album was pushed back two times. It was first pushed back when it was supposed to be released 21 June 2024, then getting pushed back to 12 July 2024, and getting pushed back another time to 15 August 2024 for no reason. Timaya feels very passionately about the album, stating that "this Gladiator project is more than just an album to me – it's a movement, a testimony to self-belief, and the courage to rise above no matter the challenges. This project reflects my journey, from where I started to where I am today, and where I'm headed. Music has given me everything, and this album is my way of giving back, because I will keep giving it all I have. I want to ignite a fire within my listeners, to remind them of the power they hold within themselves, and to encourage them to keep going, no matter what life throws at them. Life comes in phases, but you can't lose yourself – you just have to keep going".

== Singles ==
The album's lead single "Get My Money Right" was released on 30 June 2022 and produced by Spotless. The album's second single "Sweet Us" was released on 11 November 2022 and produced by Michon. The album's third single "Dey Your Dey" was released on 2 February 2024 and was produced by Masterkraft. The album's fourth single "In My Head" features Tiwa Savage and was released on 15 April 2024. The song was produced by Xtreme the Producer and the music video was directed by Director Pink.

== Track listing ==
Gladiator track listing
No.	Title	Writer(s)	Producer(s)	Length
1.	"Pay Back"	Inetimi Odon	Young D	2:33
2.	"Live- Style"	Odon	Scarlet Sounds	2:40
3.	"Sweet Us"	Odon	Michon	2:37
4.	"Compozure"	Odon	Hylander; ATG	2:26
5.	"Treasure" (featuring Alpha P, Olamide and Phyno)	Odon; Princewill Emmanuel; Olamide Adedeji; Chibuzor Azubuike	Semzi	3:34
6.	"Free"	Odon; Jessy Oliver	Yung Alpha	2:46
7.	"Whinin Criminal" (featuring Mr. Killa)	Odon; Hollice Mapp	Jonny Blaze; Deli Banger	2:28
8.	"In My Head" (featuring Tiwa Savage)	Odon; Tiwatope Savage; Michael Ajayi	Xtreme the Producer	2:57
9.	"Dey Your Dey"	Odon	Masterkraft	2:35
10.	"Smile"	Odon	Spotless	2:39
11.	"Blessings" (featuring Eugy)	Odon; Eugene Entsir	Scarlet Sounds	2:54
12.	"Na Money" (featuring Konshens)	Odon; Garfield Spence	Xtreme the Producer	2:21
13.	"Get My Money Right"	Odon	Spotless	2:57
Total length:				35:31

== Personnel ==
- Timaya – vocals, writer
- Alpha P – vocals, writer
- Olamide – vocals, writer
- Phyno – vocals, writer
- Mr. Killa – vocals, writer
- Tiwa Savage – vocals, writer
- Eugy – vocals, writer
- Konshens – vocals, writer
- Young D – producer, recording engineer
- Scarlet Sounds – producer, recording engineer
- Michon – producer, recording engineer
- Hylander – producer
- ATG – producer, mixing engineer
- Semzi – producer, recording engineer
- Yung Alpha – producer, writer, recording engineer
- Jonny Blaze – producer, recording engineer
- Deli Banger – producer
- Xtreme the Producer – producer, recording engineer
- Masterkraft – producer
- Spotless – producer, recording engineer, mixing engineer, mastering engineer
- Milla Mix – mixing engineer, mastering engineer, recording engineer
- STG – mixing engineer, mastering engineer
- Noah Airé – mixing engineer, mastering engineer
- Synx – mastering engineer
- Glody "Glo The Beatz" Kasongo – engineer
- Fiokee – guitar on "In My Head"
- C.J. Obasi – guitar on "Blessings"
- Solafunmi Yemi-Olowolabi – background vocals on "In My Head"
- Nelly – background vocals on "Blessings"
