= Soundcity MVP Awards Festival =

Awards festival for African musicians and performers

- Awarded for: Crowning the hardest working talents in Africa
- Presented by: Soundcity TV, Soundcity Radio Network and Soundcity Digital
- First award: 2016
- Website: http://soundcitymvp.com/

Television/radio coverage
- Network: Soundcity TV and Soundcity Radio Network

The Soundcity MVP Awards Festival ("TheMVPs" or "MVP") is an event presented by Soundcity TV which awards plaques to musicians and performers across Africa. Since 2007, the winners are chosen by the viewers and fans by visiting #TheMVPs' website and a select committee of the industry stakeholders. The first MVPs ceremony was held in December 2016 in Lagos, Nigeria.

The awards are presented annually and broadcast live on Soundcity TV on DStv, GOtv, TalkTalk UK, Soundcity Radio Network and Soundcity Android and iOS app as well as online on the SoundcityTV website, YouTube and other social media accounts.

== The maiden ceremony (2016) ==
The MVPs award ceremony was announced by Soundcity TV when teaser radio and TV promo began to run in the first week of November on Soundcity Radio Network and Soundcity TV tagged 'Soundcity MVP Awards Festival' and announced as 'crowning the hardest working talents in Africa'. The maiden ceremony is to take place at the Expo Centre, Eko Hotel and Suites Lagos, Nigeria, on 29 December 2016 and hosted by comedian Basketmouth. Nominated artistes range from Wizkid with eight nominations including African artiste of the year, Davido, South Africa's Emtee, Nasty C, Mafikizolo to Ghana's Mz Vee, Sarkodie and Tanzania's Diamond Platnumz and Vanessa Mdee. The event would be broadcast live across Africa via cable TV, Soundcity Mobile App, Facebook and YouTube.

Since the maiden edition, Soundcity MVP Award Festival has witness different edition of the award.

== Second edition (2017) ==
The second edition of the Soundcity MVP Awards was held at the Eko Convention Center, Victoria Island, Lagos, and was hosted by Ebuka Obi-Uchendu. This edition was in fourteen categories. which Davido won three out of the categories; Song of the Year, Video of the Year, and African Artist of the year.

Winners are highlighted in bold.

Best Male MVP	Best Female MVP
**Diamond Platnumz**; Davido; Runtown; Sarkodie; Navio; 2Baba; Wizkid; Shatta Wale; Olamide	**Tiwa Savage**; Niniola; Babes Wodumo; Simi; Becca; Seyi Shay; Yemi Alade; Bucie; Vanessa Mdee
Best Hip Hop	Best Pop
**Cassper Nyovest**; M.I; Sarkodie; Olamide; Nasty C; Falz; Kwesta; AKA	**Maleek Berry**; Kizz Daniel; Tiwa Savage; Simi; Davido; Niniola; Wande Coal; Reekado Banks
Best Collaboration	Digital Artiste of the Year
**"Pain Killer" – Sarkodie (featuring Runtown)**; "Particula" – Major Lazer & DJ Maphorisa (featuring Ice Prince, Jidenna, and Nasty C); "Ma Lo" – Tiwa Savage (featuring Wizkid); "Tonight" – R2Bees (featuring Wizkid); "Ma girl" – Toofan (featuring Patoranking); "Akanamali" – Sun-El Musician (featuring Samthing Soweto); "Telli Person" – Timaya (featuring Phyno and Olamide); "Booty Language" – Skales (featuring Sarkodie); "Juice" – Ycee (featuring Maleek Berry); "Don't Forget to Pray" – AKA and Anatii; "Na Wash" – Becca (featuring Patoranking); "Iskaba – Wande Coal and DJ Tunez; "Love Again" – C4 Pedro (featuring Sauti Sol)	**Wizkid**; Davido; Cassper Nyovest; AKA; Vanessa Mdee; Yemi Alade; Shatta Wale
Video of the Year	Best Group or Duo
**If - Davido**; "Ma Lo" – Tiwa Savage (featuring Wizkid); "You Rappers Should Fix Up Your Lives" – M.I; "Come Closer – Wizkid (featuring Drake); "Uok" – Nasty C; "10 Fingers" – AKA and Anatii; "Whole Thing" – Frank Casino and Riky Rick; "Been Calling" – Maleek Berry; "Kololo (I Still Love U)" – Banky W.; "All Hail" – Khuli Chana	**Distruction Boyz**; Sauti Sol; Toofan; Mafikizolo; Mi Casa; VVIP; R2Bees; Navy Kenzo
Song of the Year	Best New Artiste
**If – Davido**; "Penalty" – Small Doctor; "Wo!! – Olamide; "Seduce Me" – Ali Kiba; "Gobisiqolo" – Bhizer (featuring Busiswa, SC Gorna, and Bhepepe); "Gaga Shuffle" – 2Baba; "Akanamali" – Sun-El Musician (featuring Samthing Soweto); "Mad Over You" – Runtown; "Come Closer – Wizkid (featuring Drake); "Joromi" – Simi; "Leg Over" – Mr Eazi	**Maleek Berry**; Mayorkun; Dice Ailes; Small Doctor; Nadia Nakai; Aslay
Viewer's Choice	Listeners Choice
**Mad Over You – Runtown**; "Wo!!" – Olamide; "If" – Davido; "Living Things – 9ice; "Yeba" – Kizz Daniel; "Iskaba" – Wande Coal and DJ Tunez; "Tonight" – Nonso Amadi; "Gaga Shuffle" – 2Baba	**"Wo!!" – Olamide**; "Gaga Shuffle" — 2Baba; "Uok" — Nasty C; "Gobisiqolo" – Bhizer (featuring Busiswa, SC Gorna, and Bhepepe); "Mad Over You – Runtown; "Maradona" – Niniola; "Yolo Yolo" – Seyi Shay; "If" – Davido
African Producer of the Year	African Artiste Of The Year
**Young John**; Kiddominant; DJ Maphorisa; Masterkraft; Juls	**Davido**; Sarkodie; Cassper Nyovest; Wizkid; Tiwa Savage; Shatta Wale

== Third edition ==
The third edition took place at the Eko Convention Centre, Lagos on 5 January 2019. Burna Boy won four awards out of the categories. Special award category was also presented to individuals for Innovation and Excellence in their various fields of work.

Best Male MVP	Best Female MVP
Burna Boy; Nasty C; Mr Eazi; Olamide; AKA; Shatta Wale; Harmonize; Diamond Platnumz; Davido; Wizkid	Busiswa; Simi; Niniola; Tiwa Savage; Yemi Alade; Shekhinah; Efya; Becca; Lady Zamar; Maua Sama
Best Hip Hop	Best Pop
AKA; M.I; Khaligraph Jones; Nasty C; Kwesi Arthur; Phyno; Sarkodie; Kwesta; Falz; Medikal	Davido; Kizz Daniel; Fally Ipupa; Tiwa Savage; Yemi Alade; Diamond Platnumz; Mayorkun; Wizkid; Kuami Eugene; Mr Eazi
Best Collaboration	Digital Artiste of the Year
"Soco – Starboy (featuring Wizkid, Terri, Spotless, and Ceeza Milli); "Makhe" – DJ Maphorisa and DJ Simba (featuring Moonchild Sanelly); "Jibebe" – Diamond Platnumz, Mbosso, and Lava Lava; "Katika" – Navy Kenzo (featuring Diamond Platnumz); "Issa Goal" – Naira Marley (featuring Olamide and Lil Kesh); "Spirit" – Kwesta (featuring Wale); "Fake Love" – Starboy (featuring Wizkid and Duncan Mighty); "Club Controller" – Prince Kaybee and Lasoulmates (featuring TNS and Zanda Zakuza); "Said" – Nasty C and Runtown; "Amaka" – 2Baba (featuring Peruzzi)	Mr Eazi; Davido; Tiwa Savage; Burna Boy; Cassper Nyovest; Vanessa Mdee; Falz; Wizkid; Diamond Platnumz; Yemi Alade
Video of the Year	Best Group or Duo
"Heal D World" – Patoranking; "Gringo" – Shatta Wale; "Midnight Drum" – A Pass, Rouge, and Fik Fameica; "Short N Sweet" – Sauti Sol (featuring Nyashinski); "Ye" – Burna Boy; "Fever" – Wizkid; "Surrender" – Adekunle Gold; "Science Student" – Olamide; "King" – Nasty C (featuring ASAP Ferg); "Ksazobalit" – Cassper Nyovest	Navy Kenzo; Distruction Boyz; Sauti Sol; Mi Casa; Mafikizolo; Show Dem Camp; R2Bees; Toofan; Goldfish; Reggie 'n' Bollie
Song of the Year	Best New Artiste
"Ye – Burna Boy; "Short N Sweet" – Sauti Sol (featuring Nyashinski); "African Beauty" – Diamond Platnumz (featuring Omarion); "Soco" – Starboy (featuring Wizkid, Terri, Spotless, and Ceeza Milli); "Katika" – Navy Kenzo (featuring Diamond Platnumz); "Makhe" – DJ Maphorisa and DJ Simba (featuring Moonchild Sanelly); "Skeleton Move" – Master KG (featuring Zanda Zakuza); "Assurance" – Davido; "Amaka" – 2Baba (featuring Peruzzi); "Kwangwaru" – Harmonize (featuring Diamond Platnumz)	Teni; KiDi; Sho Madjozi; Odunsi the Engine; Peruzzi; Kida Kudz; Shane Eagle; King Promise; Kwesi Arthur; Mbosso
Viewer's Choice	Listener's Choice
"So Mi So" – Wande Coal; "Ye" – Burna Boy; "Drogba (Joanna)" – Afro B; "Science Student" – Olamide; "Fever" – Wizkid; "Soco" – Starboy (featuring Wizkid, Terri, Spotless, and Ceeza Milli); "Kupe Dance" – A Star; "Magun (Remix)" – Niniola (featuring Busiswa); "Available" – Patoranking; "Tiwa's Vibe" – Tiwa Savage	"Ye" – Burna Boy; "Club Controller" – Prince Kaybee and Lasoulmates (featuring TNS and Zanda Zakuza); "Katika" – Navy Kenzo (featuring Diamond Platnumz); "Soco" – Starboy (featuring Wizkid, Terri, Spotless, and Ceeza Milli); "Wetin We Gain" – Victor AD; "Kwangwaru" – Harmonize (featuring Diamond Platnumz); "Fake Love" – Starboy (featuring Wizkid and Duncan Mighty); "Confusion" – Kuami Eugene; "CCTV" – King Promise (featuring Mugeez and Sarkodie); "Askamaya" – Teni
African Producer of the Year	African Artiste Of The Year
Phantom; Killertunes; Juls; Sarz; Nahreel; Northboi; DJ Tira; Speroach Beatz; Fresh VDM; Kel-P	Burna Boy; Davido; Sarkodie; Yemi Alade; AKA; Tiwa Savage; Wizkid; Diamond Platnumz; Nasty C; Olamide
African DJ of the Year	Innovation and Excellence
DJ Neptune; Black Coffee; DJ Spinall; DJ Mic Smith; DJ Kaywise; DJ Xclusive; Prince Kaybee; DJ Arafat; DJ Maphorisa; DJ Vyrusky	Sports - Ahmed Musa; Business Entrepreneur - Ladipo Lawani; Fashion - Papa Oyeyemi; Social Entrepreneurship and Digital Influence - Bolatito Ovia; Community and Socio-Political Development - Ebenezar Wikina; Creative Arts - Clarence Peters
