= SJW (disambiguation) =

SJW, or social justice warrior, is a pejorative term for a socially progressive person.

SJW or sjw may also refer to:

== Organizations ==
- Sir James Whitney School for the Deaf, Canada
- SJW Entertainment, Nigerian record label
- SJW Group, a water utility company in California, US
- Stanford Jazz Workshop, an organization for jazz education

== Other uses ==
- Shawnee language (ISO 639-3 code: sjw)
- Shijiazhuang Zhengding International Airport (IATA code: SJW)

== See also ==
- St. John's Wort, any species of the genus Hypericum
- Sino-Japanese War (disambiguation)
