= Ebenezar Wikina =

Nigerian journalist

- Born: 10 August 1992 (age 34); Rivers
- Education: Rivers State College of Arts and Science
- Occupation: journalist

Ebenezar Wikina (born 10 August 1992) is a Nigerian journalist, biomimeticist, World Economic Forum global Shaper, and recipient of the Soundcity MVP Awards for Innovation and Excellence in Community and Socio-political development in 2019.

== Education ==
Wikina graduated from Rivers State College of Arts and Science with a Diploma in Electrical and Electronics Engineering. After graduating from Alpha Institute of Broadcasting and Communication in 2014, he went further to study journalism at the International Institute of Journalism, Abuja.

== Career ==
=== Journalism and media ===
In 2013, Wikina started an interview column, called The Stroll on which he has interviewed several global leaders from different countries. He also live-stream his interviews, where he has interviewed guests such as Michael Møller on his interview column.

He is the founder of Policy Shapers, a public policy organization, he focuses on documentation of injustices in the Niger Delta region where he provides an opportunity for indigenes to express their agitations and advocate for them.

=== Advocacy ===
Wikina was recognized by The Next Generation Foresight Practictioners for the Rivers 2050 Vision, a civic leadership and future focused development initiatives.

== Awards and nominations ==
| Year | Award | Category | Result | Ref |
|---|---|---|---|---|
| 2016 | The Future Awards Africa | Prize in News Media | Nominated | |
| 2018 | The Future Awards Africa | Prize in Public Service | Nominated | |
| 2018 | Soundcity MVP Awards | Innovation and Excellence in Community and Socio-political development | Awarded | |

== Fellowships/Memberships ==
- Mandela Washington Fellowship (2020)
- Skoll Fellowship (2024)
- The Next Generation Foresight Practitioner (NGFP) Fellowship

== Publications ==
- 10:3 Voting System: What African Wild Dogs Can Teach the UN Security Council About Voting
- Nigeria’s Public Education in a Post-COVID World: Strategies for Inclusive Learning in Tertiary Institutions
