= Ye (song) =

Song by Burna Boy

Single by Burna Boy

from the album Outside
- Released: August 6, 2018
- Genre: Afrobeats; Afropop; R&B
- Length: 3:51
- Label: Spaceship; Bad Habit; Atlantic; Warner Music France
- Songwriter: Damini Ogulu
- Producer: Phantom

Burna Boy singles chronology
"Issa Vibe (Remix)" (2018)	"Ye" (2018)	"Baba Nla" (2018)

Music video
- "Ye" on YouTube

"Ye" is a song by Nigerian singer Burna Boy. It was released on August 6, 2018, as the sixth single from his third studio album, Outside (2018). The song was produced by Nigerian record producer Phantom. It peaked at number 26 and 31 on Billboard's Mainstream R&B/Hip-Hop and R&B/Hip-Hop Airplay charts, respectively. "Ye" won Song of the Year and Listener's Choice at the 2019 Soundcity MVP Awards Festival. It also won Song of the Year and was nominated for Best Pop Single and Best Recording of the Year at The Headies 2019.

In August 2019, Rolling Stone reported that "Ye" earned around 11 million streams over seven months across major U.S. streaming platforms.

== Background and reception ==
Phantom created the beat for "Ye" in less than two hours, combining together a kick, piano synths and a few snares. His vocals were layered on the beat. "Ye" saw a 200 percent spike in its streaming numbers after searches for Kanye West's album of the same name unintentionally caused listeners to stumbled upon it. Burna Boy thanked West for the confusion on Twitter. In an email to The Fader magazine, Burna Boy said the video "essentially shows the unrelenting nature of Nigerians". A writer for The Native magazine said "Ye" is being viewed as a new anthem because it "embraces the anathema of every self-interest seeking seemingly good-natured Nigerian."

== Covers ==
Jamaican singer Koffee performed her rendition of "Ye" during her first ever London show. A few days later, she also performed her rendition on BBC Radio 1Xtra Live Lounge.

== Accolades ==
Year	Award	Category	Recipient	Result
2019	The Headies	Song of the Year	"Ye"	Won
2019	The Headies	Best Pop Single	"Ye"	Nominated
2019	The Headies	Best Recording of the Year	"Ye"	Nominated
2019	Soundcity MVP Awards Festival	Song of the Year	"Ye"	Won
2019	Soundcity MVP Awards Festival	Listener's Choice	"Ye"	Won

== Charts ==
=== Weekly charts ===
Chart (2018–2022)	Peak position
US R&B/Hip-Hop Airplay (Billboard)	31
US Afrobeats Songs (Billboard)	12
US Mainstream R&B/Hip-Hop Airplay (Billboard)	26

=== Year-end charts ===
Chart (2022)	Position
US Afrobeats Songs (Billboard)	14

== Certifications ==
Certifications for "Ye"
Region	Certification	Certified units/sales
Canada (Music Canada)	Platinum	80,000^{‡}
France (SNEP)	Platinum	200,000^{‡}
New Zealand (RMNZ)	Platinum	30,000^{‡}
Nigeria (TCSN)	Silver	25,000^{‡}
Switzerland (IFPI Switzerland)	Platinum	20,000^{‡}
United Kingdom (BPI)	Platinum	600,000^{‡}
United States (RIAA)	Platinum	1,000,000^{‡}
Streaming
Sweden (GLF)	Platinum	8,000,000^{†}
^{‡} Sales+streaming figures based on certification alone.^{†} Streaming-only figures based on certification alone.
