= Soco (song) =

Single by Starboy featuring Wizkid, Terri, Spotless, and Ceeza Milli
- Released: February 21, 2018
- Recorded: 2018
- Genre: Afrobeats
- Length: 4:15
- Label: Starboy
- Songwriters: Ayodeji Balogun; Akinre Terry; Augustine Uche; Ifeanyi Bosnah
- Producer: Northboi

Wizkid singles chronology
"Oshe" (2017)	"Soco" (2018)	"Nowo" (2018)

Terri singles chronology
"Soco" (2018)	"Bia" (2018)

Spotless singles chronology
"Soco" (2018)	"The Benz" (2018)

Ceeza Milli singles chronology
"Konfidential Love" (2017)	"Soco" (2018)	"Yapa" (2018)

Music video
- "Soco" on YouTube

"Soco" is a song released by Nigerian record label Starboy on 21 February 2018. The song was produced by Nigerian record producer Northboi and features vocals from Wizkid, Terri, Spotless and Ceeza Milli. It was certified gold by Music Canada in 2020. The song’s official music video has been viewed over 100 million times on YouTube.

== Background ==
Prior to the song's release, Wizkid teased it on social media by frequently using the hashtag #Soco. Released on 21 February 2018, the track was initially intended to serve as the lead single from Made in Lagos, a planned Starboy compilation album, which was later developed as Wizkid's fourth studio album.

== Critical reception ==
Jonathan Akan of Pulse Nigeria called the song's production "spellbinding Afrobeat fusion" and concluding that "if there's more where this came from, Wizzy's about to become every DJ and club's best friend."

=== Accolades ===
"Soco" won Song of the Year and Video of the Year at the 2018 African Muzik Magazine Awards. It won Best Collaboration of the Year at the 2018 Soundcity MVP Awards Festival.

Year	Awards ceremony	Award description(s)	Results
2018	Nigeria Entertainment Awards	Best Single	Nominated
2018	African Muzik Magazine Awards	Song of the Year	Won
2018	African Muzik Magazine Awards	Video of the Year	Won
2019	Soundcity MVP Awards Festival	Best Collaboration	Won
2019	Soundcity MVP Awards Festival	Viewer's Choice	Won
2019	African Entertainment Awards USA	Best Video	Nominated

== Charts ==
Chart (2018)	Peak position
World Digital Song Sales (Billboard)	23

== Certifications ==
Certifications for "Soco"
Region	Certification	Certified units/sales
Canada (Music Canada)	Gold	40,000^{‡}
United Kingdom (BPI)	Silver	200,000^{‡}
United States (RIAA)	Gold	500,000^{‡}
^{‡} Sales+streaming figures based on certification alone.
