= Danca (song) =

Single

Single by AcebergTM

from the EP Far from Home
- Released: 26 March 2021
- Genre: Afropop; Amapiano
- Length: 3:23
- Label: SJW Entertainment
- Songwriter: Ikechukwu Okoronkwo
- Producer: Kel-P

AcebergTM singles chronology
"Bella" (2021)	"Danca" (2021)

Music video
- "Danca" on YouTube

"Danca" is a song by Nigerian musician AcebergTM, on his debut extended play Far from Home. It is the lead song on the EP, released officially on 26 March 2021 by SJW Entertainment, and distributed through ONErpm. Written by AcebergTM and produced by Kel-P. Characterized as a blend of Afropop and Amapiano, with lyrics about a hot and spicy lady who has the moves to put on him. The song received mostly positive reviews from music critics and peaked on 31 May 2021, at number thirty-three on TurnTable Top 50.

== Background and promotion ==
He was discovered by Sir Justine, who eventually signed him to his imprint SJW Entertainment in 2020. He released "Danca" on 26 March 2021, as the lead, single off his debut extended play Far from Home, released on 16 April 2021, through SJW Entertainment, and produced by Kel-P. According to SA Hip Hop Mag, "‘Danca’ is a perfect blend of Afropop mixed with Amapiano beats".

On 19 April 2021, he tells Boomplay "Danca is just like a party jam, mostly I do rap and I just wanted something people could like vibe to. Just have everybody connecting to the music and have fun." During his interview he further revealed "Kel-P played the instrumental for me and I was like, this is hard and I just did what I know how to do on it.”

== Commercial performance ==
In review for The Native Fresh Meat: Best New Artist class of May 2021 edition, the editor-in-chief Tami Makinde said "Kel P weaves a thrumming Amapiano-influenced beat, merging it with gorgeous horns that compliment [sic] the confessional feel of the single." On 19 April 2021, "Danca", debuted at 44 on TurnTable Top 50 chart, and peaked on the week of May 31, 2021, at number 33. On 20 April 2021, during it debut week on TurnTable, it ranked at number 25 on Top 50 Airplay, and Top 50 Streaming songs in Nigeria. On 26 April 2021, it debut on Apple Music Top 100 Alternative Songs chart at number 1 in Nigeria.

As of 19 July 2022, "Danca" has received 628 thousand streams on Spotify, and 128 thousand streams on Boomplay.

== Music videos ==
The music video for "Danca" was directed by Ademola Falomo, and was released on 16 April 2021. As of July 2022, it has received 1 million views on YouTube.

== Version ==
- 2021: "Danca" - 3:23
- 2021: "Danca (KU3H Remix)" (by DJ Kush) – 2:52

== Charts ==
Performance for "Danca"
Chart (2021)	Peak position
Nigeria Top 50 (TurnTable)	33
Nigeria Top 50 Airplay (TurnTable)	25
Nigeria Top 50 Streaming (TurnTable)	25
Nigeria Top 100 Alternative Songs (Apple Music)	1
