= Azanti =

- Also known as: Azanti
- Born: Nathan Ayomikun Otekalu-Aje; October 5, 2003 (age 22); Nigeria
- Origin: Nigerian
- Genres: Afropop; R&BSoul; Pop; Afrobeats
- Occupations: Singer; songwriter
- Years active: 2021–present
- Labels: Apex Village; Def Jam
- Website: www.azantimusic.com

Azanti (born: Nathan Ayomikun Otekalu-Aje), is a Canadian-based Nigerian singer, songwriter, and music producer, signed to Apex Village, and Def Jam Recordings. He came into the music scene with a collaborative eponymous extended play titled YP and Azanti, Vol. 1 with PsychoYP, released by the music collective Apex Village. The project lead tracks include "Focused", and "Caro".

== Early life ==
Nathan Ayomikun Otekalu-Aje hails from Ondo State, Nigeria. Most of childhood, he spent immersed in music, honing his craft as a singer, songwriter, and producer. He grew up in a musically inclined environment, which influenced his early exposure to different genres. His passion for music led him to experiment with various sounds, blending Afropop, R&B, soul, and Afrobeats.

From a young age, Azanti was dedicated to developing his skills, often writing songs and creating beats, which eventually set the foundation for his career. His collaborative work, such as his EP with PsychoYP, reflects the depth of his early experiences in exploring music production and collaboration.

== Career ==
On 16 October 2021, DJ Roesh presented Azanti new single "Time Difference" on BBC Music Introducing in Manchester. In 2022, Tunji Balogun signed Azanti to Def Jam Recordings. Shortly after signing with Def Jam Recordings, he made his first US debut with "Gettin' Hot" off his studio album Heart Parts & Nostalgia, with guest appearances from Odeal, and The Cavemen. In 2023, PsychoYP made his signing to Apex Village official. The music video for "Gettin' Hot", was shot in Accra, and directed by Cindy Ihua.

Azanti told MoreBranches author Nasir Ahmed Achile, "I wasn't trying to connect with Apex. I just wanted to send an email to YP to get proper feedback on my music. Which led to us making music together". On 20 July 2023, he released a deluxe version of Heart Parts & Nostalgia with guest appearance including PsychoYP, Adekunle Gold, and Rowlene. On 31 July 2023, Billboard magazine listed "late4dinner (Remix)" featuring Adekunle Gold as one of the Afrobeats Fresh Picks of July, off Heart Parts & Nostalgia deluxe album.

In 2022, Sarz announced Azanti as the winner of the #FreeSarz Freestyle Challenge. Azanti has earned writing credit for Mr Eazi, and vocal credit on Joeboy's "Police" record.

== Artistry ==
On 18 November 2022, Office Magazine called his music a blend of R&B and Afrobeats rhythms with a touch of trap soul. In 2023, Azanti told Guardian Life Magazine multimedia journalist Chinonso Ihekire, when asked about his music influence. He said: "Musically, Drake. Drake is a very good story teller; I look up to him. It is Chris Brown when it comes to melodies. I'm also into a lot of rap artistes. Like a lot of storytellers, Jcole, Kanye West. Now, I'm listening to more rap. I have been listening to melodies all my life; from Tope Alabi to Wizkid, to Wande Coal. So, all my life I have been listening to melodies. But in the past year or two, I have been more into rap, old rap. Kanye, Drake, Jcole, people that tell intricate stories, I just find it very interesting. And I try to figure out how I can put that and make my own".

== Discography ==
=== Albums ===
List of studio albums, with selected chart positions and certifications
Title	Album details
Heart Parts & Nostalgia	Released: 18 November 2022; Label: Apex Village, Def Jam; Formats: CD, Digital download

=== EPs ===
List of extended plays, with selected details
Title	Details
YP and Azanti, Vol. 1 (with. PsychoYP)	Released: 12 November 2020; Label:Apex Village; Formats: Digital download
Azanti	Released: 24 September 2021; Label: Apex Village; Formats: Digital download
