= Outside (Burna Boy album) =

Studio album by Burna Boy
- Released: January 26, 2018
- Genre: Afrobeats; dancehall; reggae; road rap
- Length: 44:00
- Language: English; Nigerian Pidgin; Yoruba
- Label: Spaceship; Bad Habit; Atlantic
- Producer: Baba Stiltz; Chopstix; Fred; FTSE; I Am Beats; Jae5; Juls; Leriq; P2J; Phantom; Steel Banglez

Burna Boy chronology
Redemption (2016)	Outside (2018)	Steel & Copper (2019)

Singles from Outside
- 1. "Rock Your Body" Released: April 28, 2017; 2. "Streets of Africa" Released: November 24, 2017; 3. "Koni Baje" Released: December 8, 2017; 4. "Sekkle Down" Released: December 11, 2017; 5. "Heaven's Gate" Released: January 19, 2018; 6. "Ye" Released: August 6, 2018

Outside is the third studio album by Nigerian singer Burna Boy. It was released on January 26, 2018, through Spaceship Entertainment, Bad Habit and Atlantic Records. The album is the follow-up to his debut extended play Redemption (2016). Described by the singer as a mixtape, Outside consists mostly of Afrobeats, dancehall, reggae and road rap. It features guest vocals from English musicians J Hus, Lily Allen and Mabel. Outside was supported by six singles: "Rock Your Body", "Streets of Africa", "Koni Baje", "Sekkle Down", "Heaven's Gate" and "Ye". Its production was handled by various producers, including Juls, Leriq, P2J, Jae 5, FRED and Phantom.

In February 2018, Outside debuted at number three on the Billboard Reggae Albums chart. The album received critical acclaim from music critics, who commended its diverse sounds and Burna Boy's versatility. The website Pulse Nigeria and Nigerian Entertainment Today considered Outside to be the best Nigerian album of 2018. Outside won Album of the Year at the 2018 Nigeria Entertainment Awards and was nominated for Best R&B/Pop Album and Album of the Year at The Headies 2019.

== Background and promotion ==
Described by Burna Boy as a mixtape, Outside consists mostly of Afrobeats, dancehall, reggae and road rap. The album features guest vocals from English musicians J Hus, Lily Allen and Mabel. Its production was handled by Leriq, Baba Stiltz, P2J, Jae 5, Juls, Chopstix, Steel Banglez, Fred Gibson, Phantom and FTSE. The album's opener, "More Life", was one of five songs recorded for Drake's playlist of the same name, released on March 18, 2017. However, it was only featured on the outro of More Life's track "Get It Together". Burna Boy recorded the album's title track "Outside" on Pete Townshend's studio boat. He revealed that "Ye" was unconsciously recorded after a great night out at a Lagos nightclub. On January 21, 2018, Burna Boy held a private listening session for the album at the WeRe House in Lekki, Nigeria. During the session, he talked about the inspiration behind each track on the album. A few days later, he held a second listening session at the Curtain Hotel in London.

The album's lead single "Rock Your Body" was released on April 28, 2017. The accompanying music video for "Rock Your Body" was directed by Clarence Peters. In it, Burna Boy spots a girl in a club and tries his best to convince her to leave her friends and dance with him. Most of the video's footage was shot in a production studio. Peters implemented the use of "dark lighting and closeted aesthetic" while shooting it. The album's second single "Streets of Africa" was released on November 24. Reviewing for Konbini Channels, Daniel Orubo said Burna Boy "effortlessly alternates between highlighting the joyfulness of being African, bragging about his prowess with the ladies, praising his own musical ability, and warning his haters not to fuck with him."

On December 8, "Koni Baje" was released as the album's third single. The album's fourth single "Sekkle Down" was released on December 11. It was produced by Jae5 and features vocals by UK Afroswing artist J Hus. Burna Boy premiered the track on Zane Lowe's Beats 1 radio show the previous day. Prior to the release of "Sekkle Down", both artists recorded "Good Time", a track from J Hus' debut studio album Common Sense (2017). On January 19, 2018, Burna Boy released the Lily Allen-assisted "Heaven's Gate" as the album's fifth single. The accompanying music video for "Heaven's Gate" was released on the same day. Described as a "16mm filmed family affair", the video features a woman dancing in the kitchen, as well as young girls playing video games. A snippet of "Sekkle Down" is also included in the video.

The album's sixth single "Ye" was released on August 6, 2018, along with its music video. "Ye" saw a 200 percent spike in its streaming numbers after searches for Kanye West's album Ye unintentionally caused listeners to stumbled upon it. Burna Boy thanked Kanye West for the confusion on Twitter. The single peaked at number 31 at the US R&B/Hip-Hop Airplay charts. "Ye" won Song of the Year and Listener's Choice at the 2019 Soundcity MVP Awards Festival. In an email to The Fader magazine, Burna Boy said the video "essentially shows the unrelenting nature of Nigerians".

== Composition ==
On the house-influenced interlude "More Life", Burna Boy paints a picture of relaxation and in the drum-infused "Ph City Vibration", he pays homage to his hometown. The Jùjú-inspired "Koni Baje" features talking and bongo drums; the song highlights the flexibility of Burna Boy as an artist and has been described as a "tribute to his career and a prayer for himself". The Lily Allen-assisted track "Heaven's Gate" focuses on themes of betrayal and victimhood. In the introspective record "Ye", Burna Boy sings about his drive and ambition. Nigerian record producer Phantom created the beat for "Ye" in less than two hours and layered his vocals on it; the beat features a kick, piano synths and a few snares. A writer for Native magazine said "Ye" is being viewed as a new anthem because it "embraces the anathema of every self-interest seeking seemingly good-natured Nigerian." In the reggaeton-laced "Giddem", Burna Boy alternates between singing for his love interest and showcasing his skills.

The nostalgic track "Streets of Africa" was recorded over a cartoon-sounding trap beat popularized by American rapper Lil Yachty; the song was produced by Leriq and touches upon themes of love and sex. In the dancehall-highlife track "Rock Your Body", Burna Boy sings about his sexual desire to make love to his lover. Pulse Nigeria's Segun Akande described the song as a "mid-tempo hybrid of highlife, dancehall and Afro-fusion melodies." The alternative R&B track "Devil in California" has been described as "thought provoking" because of lyrics like: "It’s like all my life I’ve been knowing something's been missing, devil on my shoulder that’s why I can’t stay sober". In "Calm Down", Burna Boy confesses to using purple drank to numb his pain. The album's closing and title track "Outside" is a cross between dance and pop; it addresses his struggles and victories.

== Reception ==
Professional ratings
Review scores
Source	Rating
BellaNaija	8/10
One Tribe	4/5 stars
Pitchfork	7.7/10
TooXclusive	4/5 stars

Outside received critical acclaim from music critics. Pitchfork writer Claire Lobenfeld praised Burna Boy's versatility and said his kaleidoscopic output on the album makes it "a fine lesson in mixing genres without making mud". One Tribe magazine applauded Burna Boy for experimenting with different sounds, but ended the review saying the LP lacks "a common theme to piece all the songs together". Segun Akande of Pulse Nigeria said Outside is Burna Boy's "most personal project yet" adding it is "a deeply expository look at himself and the fears and influences that have made him such a divisive figure".

Reviewing for OkayAfrica, Mayuyuka Kaunda described the album as "easily digestible" and that Burna Boy "offers some striking observations—experienced by many—and asks us to keep dancing throughout our journey with him." Chicago Reader's Leor Galil praised the album's songs, adding their "placid percussion, effervescent melodies, and easygoing grooves create the kind of atmosphere that makes the album feel familiar on first listen." Victor Okpala of Nigerian Entertainment Today said that from a sonic standpoint, the album is Burna Boy's "most versatile offering that saw him push far beyond the boundaries of his musical dimensions – balancing speed, depth, and storytelling". Jim Donnett gave the album 4 out of 5 in a review for TooXclusive. Donnett praised the album's diverse sounds saying it "tells more of the realities of the life of an African man than [Wizkid's] Sounds from the Other Side did".

Wilfred Okichie said each song on the album "tells its own story and serves a purpose, leaving no room for waste or excess". Okichie felt the album is the "best thing Burna Boy has done in a long while, maybe his entire career." Mellowviews' writer Mutsinzi Eric said, "Burna Boy’s music is delivered like performance arts, it is marked by a heart-felt expressionism and always masked by a non-chalant [sic] melancholy." A writer for BellaNaija, who goes by the moniker Black Boy, wrote that Outside "bears evidence that Burna Boy remains defiant of the norms of the industry, the lores that trick other artistes to believe that only the pop music makers are relevant in the industry." In a review for Music in Africa, Osareme Edeoghon described the album as being "partly reflective and autobiographical", stating the singer's efforts on the LP match the album's title.

In February 2018, Outside debuted at number three on the Billboard Reggae Albums chart, spending nine weeks on the chart.

=== Accolades ===
The website Pulse Nigeria and Nigerian Entertainment Today considered Outside to be the best Nigerian album of 2018. Outside won Album of the Year at the 2018 Nigeria Entertainment Awards and was nominated for the same award at the 2018 City People Music Awards. Moreover, it was nominated for Best R&B/Pop Album and Album of the Year at The Headies 2019.

== Track listing ==
Production credits were adapted from Burna Boy's interview with Vice.

Outside track listing
No.	Title	Writer(s)	Producer(s)	Length
1.	"More Life"	Damini Ogulu	Baba Stiltz	1:32
2.	"Ph City Vibration"	Ogulu	I Am Beats	3:46
3.	"Koni Baje"	Ogulu	P2J	3:23
4.	"Sekkle Down" (featuring J Hus)	Ogulu; Momodou Jallow	Jae5	3:08
5.	"Where I'm From"	Ogulu	Steel Banglez	3:07
6.	"Heaven's Gate" (featuring Lily Allen)	Ogulu; Lily Cooper	FRED	3:22
7.	"Ye"	Ogulu	Phantom	3:51
8.	"Giddem"	Ogulu	Chopstix	3:31
9.	"Streets of Africa"	Ogulu	Leriq	3:30
10.	"Rock Your Body"	Ogulu	Juls	3:41
11.	"Devil in California"	Ogulu	P2J	3:15
12.	"Calm Down"	Ogulu	Jae5	4:25
13.	"Outside" (featuring Mabel)	Ogulu; Mabel McVey	FTSE	3:38
Total length:				44:00

Notes

- "Giddem" features an interpolation of "So Into You", performed by Tamia.
- "Ye" features an interpolation of "Sorrow, Tears, and Blood", performed by Fela Kuti.

== Personnel ==
- Damini Ogulu – primary artist, writer
- Momodou Jallow – featured artist, writer
- Lily Cooper – featured artist, writer
- Mabel McVey – featured artist, writer
- Baba Stiltz – production (track 1)
- I Am Beats – production (track 2)
- Peter Jay – production (tracks 3, 11)
- Jonathan Mensah – production (tracks 4, 12)
- Pahuldip Singh Sandhu – production (track 5)
- Fred Gibson – production (track 6)
- Phantom – production (track 7)
- Chopstix – production (track 8)
- Eric Isaac Utere – production (track 9)
- Juls – production (track 10)
- FTSE – production (track 13)

== Charts ==
Chart (2011)	Peak position
Nigerian Albums (TurnTable)	87
US Reggae Albums (Billboard)	3

== Release history ==
Release history and formats for Outside
Region	Date	Format	Label	Ref
Various	January 26, 2018	CD, Digital download	Spaceship; Bad Habit; Atlantic	
