= Sarkodie =

Sarkodie is a Ghanaian surname. Notable people with the surname include:

- Benjamin Dabo Sarkodie, Ghanaian healthcare practitioner
- Emmanuel Sarkodie (born 1996), Ghanaian footballer
- James Edusei Sarkodie, Ghanaian politician
- Joseph Alexander Tuffour Sarkodie (born 1932), Ghanaian politician
- Kofi Sarkodie-Mensah (born 1981), Ghanaian-born American professional wrestler
- Kofi Sarkodie (born 1991), American soccer player
- Kwame Sarkodie (born 1985), American soccer player
- Peter Sarkodie (born 1961), Ghanaian politician

== See also ==
- Sarkodie Owusu Addo (born 1985), Ghanaian rapper
