= Benjamin Dabo Sarkodie =

Ghanaian healthcare practitioner

Benjamin Dabo Sarkodie is a Ghanaian healthcare practitioner who holds the distinction as the first certified interventional radiologist in Ghana. He led a seven member team of Ghanaiain doctors to perform the first ever brain surgery without cutting the skull are term known as minimally invasive surgery in Ghana, technically known as Endovascular brain aneurysm coiling.

== Career and life ==
He was a vising fellow at the hospital of the university of Pennsylvania in the United States. He also completed his clinical fellowship in Endovascular and Interventional Radiology at the Singapore General Hospital. He lectures at the University of Ghana School of Medicine and Denstistry. He is also a fellow of the West African College of Surgeons. A recipient of international scholar award from the society of interventional Radiology.
