= Oxlade =

Oxlade is a surname. Notable people with the surname include:

- Alex Oxlade-Chamberlain (born 1993), English professional footballer
- Allen Martindale Oxlade (1882–1932), Australian rugby player
- Aubrey Oxlade (1882–1955), Australian cricket administrator
- Boyd Oxlade (1943–2014), Australian author and screenwriter
- Chris Oxlade (born 1961), British author and illustrator
- Gail Vaz-Oxlade (born 1959), Jamaican-Canadian financial writer and television personality
- Jocelyn Oxlade (born 1984), Filipino-British singer and model
- Roy Oxlade (1929–2014), English painter and writer on art
