= AcebergTM =

Nigerian singer

- Born: Ikechukwu Okoronkwo; Lagos
- Origin: Nigerian
- Genres: Afrofusion; Afropop; Hip hop; R&B; Afrobeats; Amapiano
- Occupations: Singer; Songwriter; Rapper
- Instruments: Vocals
- Years active: 2021–present
- Label: SJW Entertainment

Ikechukwu Okoronkwo, better known by his stage name AcebergTM, is a Nigerian Afro pop singer, songwriter, and rapper signed to SJW Entertainment. He is known for his breakthrough single "Danca", released in 2021 as the lead single off his extended play Far from Home, released through SJW Entertainment. On 31 May 2021, "Danca" peaked at 33 on the Nigeria TurnTable Top 50 chart. On 20 April 2021, during it debut week on TurnTable, it ranked at number 25 on Top 50 Airplay, and Top 50 Streaming songs in Nigeria.

== Early life ==
Ikechukwu Okoronkwo was born in Surulere, a commercial area in Lagos, and hails from Abia State. He had his secondary education at Command Secondary School, Ipaja in Lagos State, and his tertiary education at Federal Polytechnic, Nekede, where he studied Computer Science, and graduated with a bachelor's degree in 2018. Ikechukwu Okoronkwo is the second child, from a family of five.

== Career ==
My passion for writing and poetry, led me into writing my own songs at age 15.

— Vanguard

=== 2014–2019: MTN Rap Battle, SJW Entertainment ===
In 2014, he won MTN Rap Battle held in Federal University of Technology at Owerri West. Thereafter, he began his rap career as Aceberg and released his first promotional rap single titled "Letter to God" in 2018. The song was made available for free downloads across Nigerian blogs. During the early years of his career as an underground rapper, he was discovered in 2019 by Sir Justine, who eventually signed him to SJW Entertainment in March, the following year.

=== 2021–present: "Danca", Far from Home ===
In 2021, he achieved mainstream with the "Danca", a blend of Afropop and Amapiano, produced by Kel-P, and released on 26 March 2021, as the lead single off his extended play Far from Home. Few weeks after the release, it debut at number 44 on the Nigeria TurnTable Top 50 chart, on the week of April 19, 2021, and reached number 33, on the 6th week. The music video for "Danca" was released on 16 April 2021 and directed by Ademola Falomo. It was accompany with the release of his first extended play Far from Home, though SJW Entertainment, and executively produced by Sir Justine, with additional production from Phantom, Tempoe, Kel-P, JFred, and Winexroll.

On 21 April 2021, in an interview with Legit.ng, he said "Growing up as a kid, music turned out to be my only escape from peer pressure and other vices which kids my age were involved in such as smoking and street fighting. I felt a strong sense of peace and satisfaction whenever I heard my favorite songs growing up." On 6 August 2021, "Bella" was released as a promotional single, and was initially released through Far from Home extended play in April. It was accompany with the release of the music video directed by Ademola Falomo. In September 2021, he started his media tour in Ghana to promote Far from Home extended plays.

== Artistry ==
Flaunt Magazine writer Shirley Ju, describes his style of music as a fusion of Rap, R&B, and Afrobeats—that will undoubtedly have you moving on the dance floor. In 2021, he tells GhanaWeb "I focus mainly on Hip-hop, and R&B, while growing up, listening to R Kelly." He citied J. Cole, Burna Boy, Drake, and Wyclef Jean, as his musical influence. On 13 March 2021, he tells The Guardian writer Daniel Anazia, "The kind of music I make is quite different from the type of music that we listen to in this part of the world."

== Discography ==
=== EPs ===
List of extended plays, with selected details
Title	Details
Far from Home	Released: 16 April 2021; Label: SJW Entertainment; Formats: Digital download

=== Singles ===
List of charted singles, with selected chart positions
Title	Year	Peak chart positions			Certifications	Album
Title	Year	NG	UK	US	Certifications	Album
"Heart Breaker"	2020	—	—	—		non-album single
"Danca"	2021	33	—	—		Far from Home
"Bella"	2021	—	—	—		Far from Home
"Ready" (with. Peruzzi)	2022	—	—	—		TBA
