= The Mayor of Lagos =

Studio album by Mayorkun
- Released: November 16, 2018
- Recorded: 2017–2018
- Genre: Afropop
- Length: 44:06
- Label: Davido Music Worldwide
- Producer: Speroach Beatz; Cracker Mallo; Fresh VDM; Kiddominant; DJ Coublon; Phantom; Northboi; Killertunes; Lussh

Mayorkun chronology
The Mayor of Lagos (2018)	Back in Office (2021)

Singles from The Mayor of Lagos
- 1. "Mama" Released: July 5, 2017; 2. "Che Che" Released: November 2, 2017; 3. "Bobo" Released: March 25, 2018; 4. "Fantasy" Released: August 12, 2018; 5. "Posh" Released: August 12, 2018

The Mayor of Lagos is the debut studio album by Nigerian singer Mayorkun. It was released on November 16, 2018, through Davido Music Worldwide. The album's production was handled by Speroach Beatz, Cracker Mallo, Fresh VDM, Kiddominant, DJ Coublon, Phantom, Northboi, Killertunes and Lussh. Mayorkun enlisted Davido, Sarkodie, D'banj, Patoranking and other label mates to appear as guest artists on the album. Preceding the album's release were five singles: "Mama", "Che Che", "Bobo", "Fantasy" and "Posh". The album won Best R&B/Pop Album at The Headies 2019.

== Background and promotion ==
In 2017, Mayorkun embarked on a nationwide campus tour, performing at over 35 schools and headlining "The Mayor of Lagos" year-end concert in Lagos. On December 31, 2017, Mayorkun announced on Twitter that he would release the album in 2018. Shows for the "Mayor of Lagos" concert series were held in Ibadan and Abuja. A date for the concert's Lagos edition was announced. Mayorkun performed in six cities during his tour of the United Kingdom in 2018, and also performed with Davido at the Wireless Festival.

The Mayor of Lagos was made available for pre-order on November 9, 2018 and for purchase and online streaming on several music platforms, including Amazon Music, Apple Music, Deezer and Spotify. It debuted and peaked at number 15 on the Billboard World Albums chart in December 2018.

== Composition ==
The Mayor of Lagos opens with "Feelings (Intro)", a mid-tempo song that addresses Mayorkun's career beginnings and vulnerable side; the song ends with a phone prayer between him and his mother. In the party track "Sope", Mayorkun celebrates his life and is thankful for everything. In the romantic track "Tire", he talks about his passion and what he is willing to do for his love interest. The party track "Fantasy" is inspired by Olu Maintain's "Yahooze". The mid-tempo song "Aya Mi" is composed of talking drums and Yoruba chants. The Northboi-produced "Posh" is a dance song. "Oshepete" is an Afrobeats-inspired record. "Drama Queen" combines elements of rock music with jazz and was described as one of the album's standouts. "Mofo" is a dancehall track. "Red Handed" is an Afrobeats song with a reggae-inspired beat; its title was derived from Shaggy's "It Wasn't Me". The dance track "Bobo" was produced by Killertunes and Lussh. "Che Che" and "Mama" were both produced by Kiddominant.

== Critical reception ==
Professional ratings
Review scores
Source	Rating
Naijaloaded	8/10
Pulse Nigeria	3.5/5 stars

The Mayor of Lagos received generally positive reviews from music critics and consumers. Naijaloaded granted the album 8 stars out of 10, saying Mayorkun has "proved beyond every reasonable doubt that he's here to stay." Joey Akan said the album has "very little low points" and opined that Mayorkun "knows the sound spectrum along which he is allowed to pick and choose." Ehis Ohunyon of Pulse Nigeria awarded the album 3.5 stars out of 5, describing it as a "project that hits the right notes and hands Mayorkun the keys to the city filled with pop anthems."

Conversely, Dennis Peter of Nigerian Entertainment Today criticized Mayorkun and said the album proves he has "zero creative bones in his body."

=== Accolades ===
Year	Award	Category	Result	Ref.
2019	The Headies	Best R&B/Pop Album	Won	
2019	City People Music Awards	Music Album of the Year	Won	

== Track listing ==
No.	Title	Producer(s)	Length
1.	"Intro (Feelings)" (featuring My Mum)	Speroach Beatz	2:43
2.	"Sope"	Cracker Mallo	2:49
3.	"Tire"	Fresh VDM	2:58
4.	"Fantasy"	Kiddominant	3:37
5.	"Aya Mi"	DJ Coublon	3:41
6.	"Posh"	Northboi	3:20
7.	"Oshepete" (featuring D'banj)	Kiddominant	3:08
8.	"Jonze Me" (featuring Sarkodie)	Phantom	3:31
9.	"Drama Queen"	Fresh VDM	2:22
10.	"Mofo" (featuring Patoranking)	Killertunes	2:49
11.	"Red Handed" (featuring Peruzzi, Dremo & Yonda)	Fresh VDM	2:43
12.	"Bobo" (featuring Davido)	Killertunes; Lussh	3:32
13.	"Che Che"	Kiddominant	3:35
14.	"Mama"	Kiddominant	3:18
Total length:			44:06

Track notes

- "Jonze Me" contains additional vocals by Broda Shaggi.
- "Aya Mi" contains additional vocals by Oyemykke.

== Charts ==
Chart (2014)	Peak position
Billboard (World Albums chart)	15
