= PsychoYP =

Nigerian rapper

- Also known as: Psycho
- Born: Nicholas Ihua-Maduenyi; 28 October 1998 (age 27); Abuja, Nigeria
- Genres: Alternative hip hop; alté; afropop; afroswing; trap; drill
- Occupations: Rapper; singer; songwriter
- Years active: 2017–present
- Label: Apex Village

Nicholas Ihua-Maduenyi (born 28 October 1998), widely known as PsychoYP, is a Nigerian alternative hip hop rapper, singer, and songwriter. He is a member of the music collective Apex Village. He came into the music scene with a critically acclaimed mixtape, YPSZN, which earned him a nomination at the SAMAs, and the Headies for his second fit album YPSZN2. Dubbed "The Fresh Prince of Nigerian Rap", he is regarded as one of Nigeria's rap music pioneers in the alté music scene.

== Early life ==
Music came to me when I found like-minded friends that also had a passion for it. Together we found where we could record and make what we wanted. I decided it was for me as soon as I started making what I knew would be Psycho YP’s sound. That was around 2016.

— The Guardian

Ihua-Maduenyi was born on 28 October 1998 in Abuja, and comes from Rivers State. While in secondary school in 2013, he met with Kuddi Is Dead, a member of Apex Village. In an interview with OkayAfrica, he said "as a kid, I was always around music. My mum would play Nigerian music, music from other African countries, and foreign music. I like to think she played a big role in putting me on this path by being in love with music. We'd have P-Square, Michael Jackson, Drake, and Lil Wayne (to name a few) on repeat every weekend. My two siblings and I all had experience with singing and rapping, but something about it just kept me going".

== Career ==
YP is an acronym for "Yung Papi". In 2016, he launched his music career as a rapper on SoundCloud as Psycho, while based in Manchester, England, and went on to release his EP "Lost In The Sauce" on 26 August 2016. In the following year, YP and Kuddi is Dead released a collaborative 4-track EP "This Is What You Wanted" on 21 May 2017, and released a SoundCloud exclusive with "This Is What You Wanted II" on 21 February 2018, featuring Ayüü, Zilla Oaks, and Marv OTM. On 8 June 2018, he released "YPSZN", with guest appearances from Fasina, Marv OTM, Denzel Oaks, Zilla Oaks, and Remy Baggins. The project spawned the hit track "Oga".

On the 28 October 2018, he released a music video for Oga, directed by Kuddi is Dead, and Lekinson. On 22 March 2019, he released "Oga (remix)" featuring Blaqbonez, and Ycee. On the 4th of November, 2019, he released "YPSZN2", with guest appearances from BOJ, Terri, Nathalie Sade, Dami Oniru, Ayüü, Zilla Oaks, Ladipoe, Skales, and Blaqbonez. On the 12th of November, 2020, YP and Azanti went on to release their self-titled debut EP "YP & Azanti, Vol. 1". The extended play spawned the minor hit tracks "Caro", and "Focused". On the 11th of March, 2021, the official music video for "Caro" was released, directed by Cindy Ihua, and produced through Ceeander Entertainment, and Legacy Films.

On 26 August 2021, YP released his first solo EP Euphoria, with guest appearances from Trill Tega, Rasstokyo, J Molley, PatricKxxLee, and Alpha P. On 20 December 2021, he headlined his first Lagos concert at Hard Rock Cafe in Nigeria, featuring guest appearances from Blaqbonez, Dremo, Laycon, Wurld, Alpha P, Terry Apala, Laime, Mojo, SGaWD, King Perryy, and many more. In 2022, he released his third mixtape album YPSZN3 on 2 November. The mixtape album's lead singles include "Bando Diaries", "IC3", and "Stronger", which features a guest vocal from Zlatan. On August 17, 2022 he collaborated with Favi and Hotkid on Crime. On 8 November 2022, YPSZN3 debuted on the newly launched Nigeria TurnTable Top 50 chart at number 26.

== Artistry ==
PsychoYP is known for fusing Afrobeats, Afroswing, Hip hop, Trap, Grime, Drill and R&B, to create his musical element. In high school, his friends began calling him Yung Papi, and "Papi Chulo". Nicholas eventually picked up "Yung Papi" as an acronym for YP, before adopting Psycho, from a movie he watched to form the stage name PsychoYP. Nicholas "PsychoYP" cited the Nigerian rapper M.I, and the American rappers Drake, Lil Wayne, and Gucci Mane, as his musical influence and/or inspiration while growing up.

== Discography ==
=== EPs ===
List of studio extended plays, with selected details and chart positions
Title	Details	Peak chart positions
Title	Details	NG
Euphoria	Released: 26 August 2021; Label: Apex Village, ONErpm; Formats: Digital download	

=== Collaborative EPs ===
List of joint EPs, with selected details and chart positions
Artists	Title	Details	Peak chart positions
Artists	Title	Details	NG
PsychoYP & Kuddi Is Dead	This Is What You Wanted	Released: 21 May 2017; Label: Formats: Digital download	
PsychoYP & Kuddi Is Dead	This Is What You Wanted II	Released: 21 February 2018; Label: Apex Village; Formats: Digital download	
PsychoYP & Azanti	YP & Azanti, Vol. 1	Released: 12 November 2020; Label: Apex Village; Formats: Digital download	

=== Mixtapes ===
List of mixtapes, with selected details and chart positions
Title	Details	Peak chart positions
Title	Details	NG
YPSZN	Released: 8 June 2018; Label: Formats: Digital download	
YPSZN2	Released: 4 November 2019; Label: Apex Village; Formats: Digital download	
YPSZN3	Released: 2 November 2022; Label: Apex Village; Formats: Digital download	26

=== Singles ===
==== As lead artist ====
List of charted singles, with selected chart positions
Title	Year	Peak chart positions			Album
Title	Year	NG	SA	UK	Album
"Who Dis"	2017	—	—	—	Non-album singles
"To the Max" (featuring Odunsi)	2018	—	—	—	Non-album singles
"Be Like You"	2019	—	—	—	Non-album singles
"Euphoria"	2021	—	—	—	Euphoria
"IC3"	2022	—	—	—	YPSZN3
"Bando Diaries"	2022	—	—	—	YPSZN3
"Stronger" (featuring Zlatan)	2022	—	—	—	YPSZN3
"Midlife Crisis"	2022	—	—	—	TBA
"WYDTM" (featuring Azanti)	2022	—	—	—	TBA

== Awards and nominations ==
Year	Award	Category	Nominee/Work	Result
2018	Nigerian Teens Choice Awards	Choice Fast Rising Artist	Himself	Nominated
2018	Nigerian Teens Choice Awards	Choice Hip Hop Artist	Himself	Nominated
2020	South African Music Awards	Rest Of Africa Artist	Himself for YPSZN2	Nominated
2020	The Headies	Best Rap Album	YPSZN2	Nominated
2023	The Headies	Best Rap Single	"Bando Diaries"	Pending
2023	The Headies	Best Rap Album	YPSZN3	Pending

=== Featured in ===
- Crime By Favi
