= SJW Entertainment =

Record label in Nigeria

- Founded: 2019
- Founder: Sir Justine
- Status: Active
- Genre: Various
- Country of origin: Nigeria
- Location: Lagos
- Official website: sjwentertainment.com

SJW Entertainment, is a Nigerian record label owned by Sir Justine. SJW services includes, music recording, merchandising, audiovisual content, and music publishing. The label is home to recording acts, such as Victor AD, AcebergTM, and Blaq Jerzee.

== History ==
In 2019, Sir Justine founded Sir Justine World Entertainment, commonly known and abbreviated as SJW Entertainment, with the aim to make Nigerian music industry greater, he tells Rotimi Ige of Nigerian Tribune. Victor AD was welcomed to SJW Entertainment on 14 May 2019, with a single "Emoji", and on 26 November 2019, Blaq Jerzee signed a record deal with SJW, and AcebergTM joined its artist roaster on 14 March 2020. A month after he signed, he released his first project titled Far from Home - EP.

== Roaster ==
=== Current acts ===
Act	Year signed	Releases under the label
Victor AD	2019	1
Blaq Jerzee	2019	—
AcebergTM	2020	1

== Discography ==
=== Albums/Mixtape/EP ===
Artist	Album	Details
Victor AD	RED EYE - EP	Release: 02 August 2019; Label: SJW Entertainment; Format: CD, Digital download
AcebergTM	Far from Home - EP	Release: 16 April 2021; Label: SJW Entertainment; Format: CD, Digital download

=== Singles ===
`List of singles released by artists signed to SJW Entertainment
Artist	Title	Year	Album	Release date
Victor AD	"Emoji"	2019	Non-album single	May 14, 2019
Victor AD	"Too Much Money"	2019	Non-album single	October 16 2019
Victor AD	"Fact"	2020	RED EYE	May 10, 2020
Victor AD	"Prayer Request" (feat. Patoranking)	2020	Non-album single	July 24, 2020
Victor AD	"Vanessa"	2020	RED EYE	September 7, 2020
Victor AD	"Wet" (with. Peruzzi)	2020	Non-album single	November 27, 2020
Blaq Jerzee	"Arizona" (with. Wizkid)	2020	TBA	January 31, 2020
Blaq Jerzee	"Onome"	2020	TBA	May 1, 2020
AcebergTM	"Heart Breaker"	2020	Non-album single	July 31, 2020
AcebergTM	"Danca"	2021	Far from Home	March 26, 2021
AcebergTM	"Bella"	2021	Far from Home	August 6, 2021
