= Eugy =

Ghanaian-British singer, rapper, and songwriter

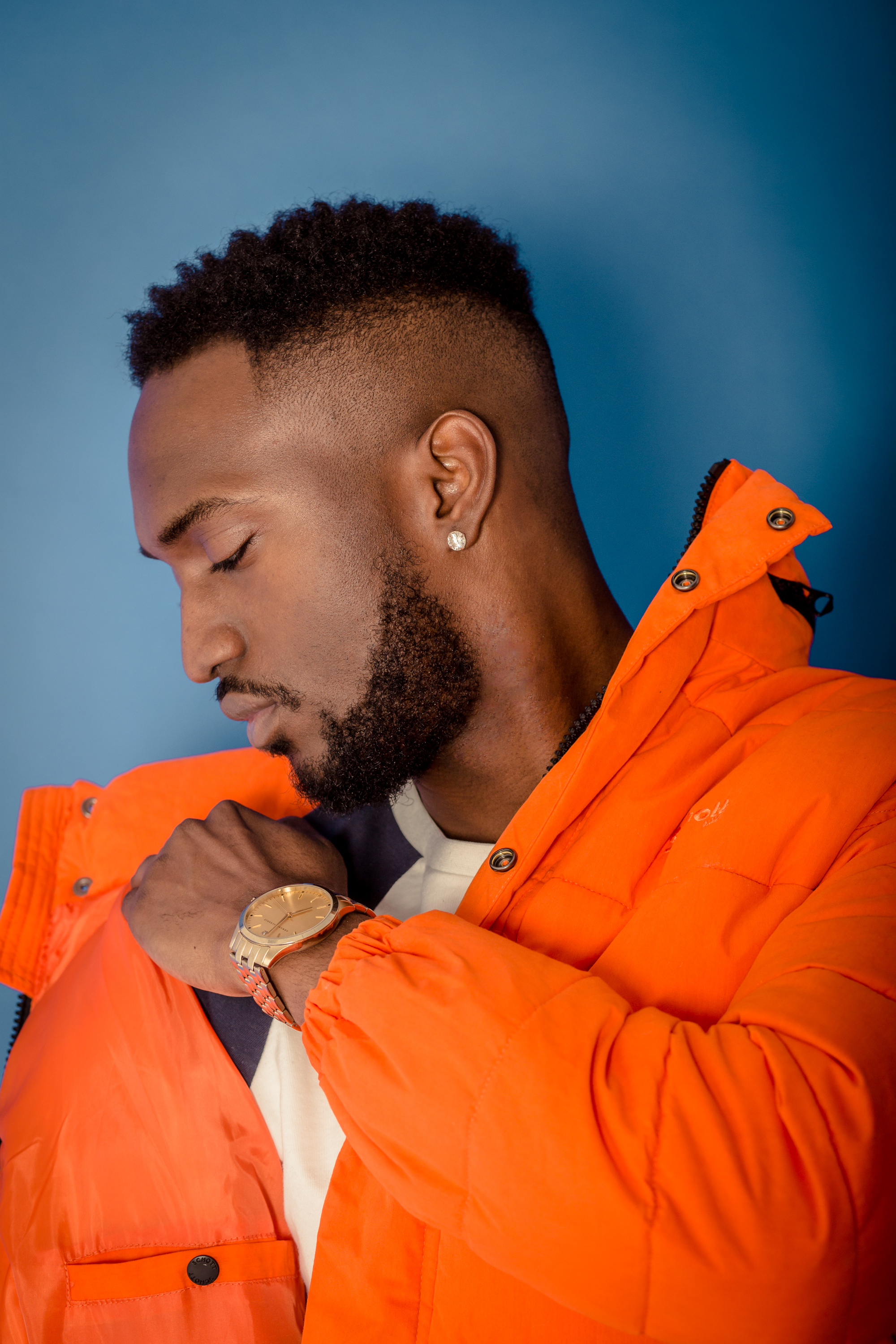
- Eugy in 2018

Background information
- Born: Eugene Entsir; Ghana
- Genres: R&B; afrobeats; hip hop; pop
- Occupations: Singer; Rapper
- Instrument: Vocals
- Years active: 2015–present
- Label: Future State Inc

Eugene Entsir, professionally known as Eugy, is a Ghanaian-British singer, rapper, and songwriter.

In 2007, Eugene Entsir appeared in court on trial, along with 4 others for the unprovoked attack and murder of Steven Jeeves in July 2006. A man was attacked by a gang in a Hertfordshire street and fatally stabbed, a court has heard.

== Career ==
Eugy started writing and recording music at around age 14, having moved to London, UK from Ghana eight years prior. He originally started as a grime MC moving more towards afrobeats after being inspired by highlife musicians he grew up listening to such as Daddy Lumba and Kojo Antwi.

His career took off after Nigerian artist Davido reached out to him after seeing a freestyle video he posted online. This resulted in a collaboration and the release of Eugy's debut single, "'Chance", in 2015. However, his profile increased drastically following the international success of 2016 single "Dance For Me" with Mr Eazi, which is considered by some to be 'UK Afrobeats' first bonafide smash'.

Following a string of releases, Eugy signed with Disturbing London in April 2018 whilst also supporting Wizkid at the sold out Afrorepublik Show at the O2 Arena. He followed this with the release of “Tick Tock” as well as "L.O.V.E" alongside Ghanaian artist King Promise. Eugy would go on to release hit single "LoLo", releasing in March 2019 which was followed by popular remixes by Columbian singer Farina and Tanzanian crooner Harmonize.

== Discography ==
=== Selected singles ===
As lead artist
Year	Title	Album
2015	"Chance" (featuring Davido)	Non-album single
2016	"Dance For Me" (with Mr Eazi)	Non-album single
2016	"Body" (with Mr Eazi)	Non-album single
2016	"Blessing"	Non-album single
2016	"Don Corleone"	Non-album single
2017	"Give It Up To Me" (featuring Ycee)	Flavourz EP
2018
2018	"Tick Tock"	Non-album single
2018	"Complicated" (with Will Simms)	Non-album single
2018	"L.O.V.E" (featuring King Promise)	Non-album single
2018	"Can't Deny" (with Korbz)	Non-album single
2019	"LoLo"	Non-album single
2020	"My Touch"(with Chop Daily)	
As featured artist
Year	Title	Album
2017	"Somebody" (Mark Asari featuring Eugy & Victizzle)	Non-album single
2017	"Right Here" (Geko featuring Mr Eazi, Maleek Berry & Eugy)	Lionheart
2017	"Bad" (Juls featuring Eugy, Not3s & Kojo Funds)	Leap Of Faith
2017	"What's Good?" (Roadside G's featuring Eugy)	Non-album single
2017	"Your Matter" (Seyi Shay featuring Eugy)	Non-album single
2017	"Innocent" (P Montana featuring Eugy, Kwamz & Flava)	Rah Boy Vol.1
2017	"Kwasia" (Nonso Amadi featuring Eugy)	Non-album single
2017	"Hot Property" (Team Salut featuring Tion Wayne, Afro B & Eugy)	Non-album single
2017	"Say What You Want" (Siza featuring Eugy)	Non-album single
2018	"Say Bye Bye" (Ycee featuring Eugy)	Non-album single
2018	"So Wavy" (Mystro featuring Eugy)	Sugar
2018	"What's Good" (Roadside G's featuring Dan Diggerz, Phantom & Eugy)	Non-album single
2018	"Gari n Sugar" (Shirazee featuring Eugy)	Home & Away EP
2018	"Ghana Bounce" (Ajeibutter22 featuring Mr Eazi & Eugy)	Non-album single
2018	"The Way I Like It" (Romy Rose featuring Eugy)	Non-album single
2018	"Me Gusta" (Romy Rose featuring Eugy)	Non-album single
2018	"Tout Va Bien (remix)" (Orelsan featuring Eugy & Kojo Funds)	La fête est finie - EPILOGUE
2019	"Kumbaya" (Atueyii featuring Eugy & Sona)	Non-album single
2019	"Rendezvous"	Non-album single

=== Extended plays ===
Title	Notes
Flavourz EP	Released: 2017; Format: Digital download
