= KalyJay =

Ghanaian Influencer

Joshua Buernortey Boye-Doe
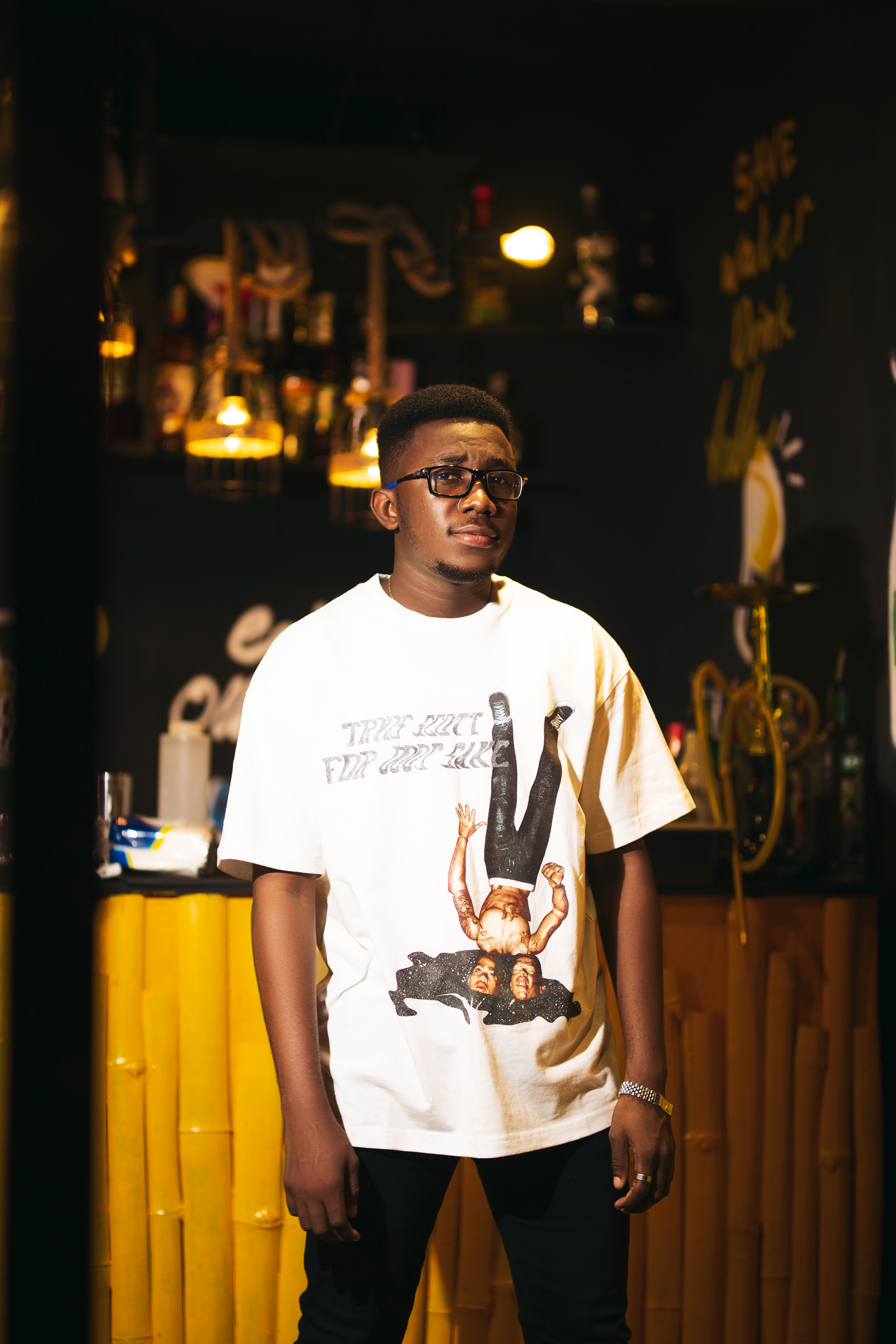
- Born: January 24, 1997 (age 29)
- Other names: KalyJay
- Occupation: Social Media Influencer
- Years active: 2019

Joshua Buernortey Boye-Doe known as KalyJay is a Ghanaian social media influencer and activist who has raised awareness about challenges in the Ghanaian community through his social media platform. He is known for his role in the hashtag #FixTheCountry which later became a social media campaign that developed into a public protest against the Ghanaian government in the early part of 2021.

== Early life and education ==
KalyJay attended the Ghana Institute of Journalism and was awarded a Bachelor Degree in Communication Studies specializing in Public Relations. Prior to that he attended Christland International School and Okuapeman Senior High School for his junior and senior high school education respectively.

== Career and advocacy ==
KalyJay started out in 2019 as a social media influencer when his Twitter now X page begun to gain traction. He began performing influencer functions through promotion, and championing appeal for fund causes for the needy and sick. He has since through his platform garner ambassadorial deals and sponsorships from companies like Fan Milk, Nivea, Jumia, Bolt (company), United Bank for Africa, First Atlantic Bank, Huawei, Bet Planet, Betway and Ticketlake.

In May 2021, KalyJay through his platform with over 600,000 followers begun a social media campaign under the hashtag #FixTheCountry. The campaign sought for accountability and good governance from the Ghanaian government. The social media protest evolved later into a national protest that saw a large number of Ghanaians gather to protest on the streets of Accra in August, 2021.

In October 2021, KayJay partnered with Grammy board member Richardine Bartine to use his platform as a tool to feature and promote international artists. The platform has featured many African stars such as Sarkodie (rapper), D-Black, Tiwa Savage, Darkovibes, Joeboy, Wendy Shay, and Mona4real among other acts, bringing their fans together through his Twitter Space.

== Awards and honors ==
Year	Recipient/Nominated work	Award	Result	Ref.
2021	Twitter Influencer of the Year	Pulse Influencers Awards	Won	
2021	Brand Influencer of the Year	National Communication Awards	Nominated	
2021	Online Media Personality of the Year	National Communication Awards	Nominated	
2021	Advocate of Good Governance	GhanaWeb Excellence Awards	Nominated	
2021	Social Media Personality of the Year	GhanaWeb Excellence Awards	Nominated	
2020	Twitter Influencer Of The Year	Ghana Twitter Awards	Nominated	
