= Timaya =

Nigerian singer and songwriter (born 1980)

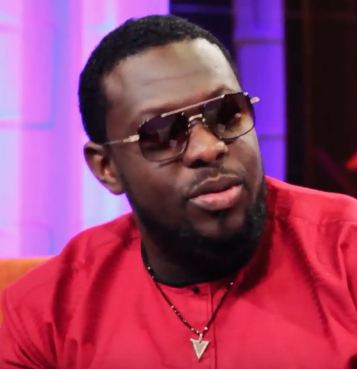

Background information
- Born: Inetimi Alfred Odon; 15 August 1980 (age 46); Port Harcourt, Rivers State, Nigeria
- Origin: Sampou, Kolokuma/Opokuma, Local Government Area, Bayelsa State, Nigeria
- Genres: Dancehall; ragga; hip-hop; Afrobeats; soca
- Occupations: Singer; songwriter
- Instrument: Vocals
- Years active: 2005–present
- Label: DM Records

Inetimi Alfred Odon (born 15 August 1980), known by his stage name Timaya, is a Nigerian singer and songwriter. He is from Sampou, Bayelsa State, Nigeria.Timaya is known for combining Nigerian pop with elements of dancehall, hip-hop and soca, as well as Afro-Caribbean/Dancehall music. He is the founder of DM (Dem Mama) Records Limited.

Timaya's solo career began in 2005 with the release of the single "Dem Mama," which is about the Odi massacre. His debut album, True Story, was released the following year, and his second album, Gift and Grace, was released in 2008. His third studio album, De Rebirth, was released in collaboration with Black Body Entertainment and featured the single "Plantain Boy". He collaborated with Dem Mama Soldiers on the album LLNP (Long Life N Prosperity), released in 2011. In 2012, Timaya released Upgrade. To date, his work has earned him four Headies Awards, two AFRIMMA Awards, one Nigeria Music Award, and one NEA Award.

== Early life ==
Inetimi Alfred Odon was born on 15 August 1980, in Port Harcourt City, Rivers State, Nigeria. He grew up as the youngest of 15 children in a large family. His father worked as a banker, while his mother was a trader. For his early education, Timaya attended Assemblies of God Nursery and Primary School. His secondary education began at Nkpolu Oroworukwo in Port Harcourt, where he often broke house rules to attend late-night music events. After relocating to Lagos, he enrolled at Ikeja Grammar School where he obtained his secondary school certificate.

Timaya enrolled at the University of Port Harcourt, only to drop out after the first semester due to low grades, eventually moving back to Lagos to join Eedris Abdulkareem's hip-hop group as a backup vocalist. After three years with Eedris, Timaya left the group to pursue a solo career. He began collaborations with fellow new artists and made his first cameo appearance in an unreleased music video by UDX, a Lagos-based rap group. Subsequently, he met producer Obaksolo in Mafoluku, Oshodi, who produced his first major hit record, "Dem Mama", after hearing his a cappella performance. Timaya collaborated with Namse Udosen (Menthol X) on "Pomporo", a track on his debut album True Story.

== Career ==
=== 2005–2009: True Story, Gift and Grace, and De Rebirth ===
Timaya's solo career began in 2005 with the release of his debut single, "Dem Mama", which recounted the Odi massacre. The song appeared on his debut album, True Story, released the following year to critical acclaim. His second album, Gift and Grace, was released in 2008, and was reportedly recorded in two weeks. His third studio album, De Rebirth, was released in partnership with Black Body Entertainment. This album featured the hit single "Plantain Boy".

=== 2010–2017: Upgrade, Epiphany, Bum Bum Remix, and Grammy nomination ===
In 2010, Timaya was featured on the song "Kokoroko" by the late female gospel artist Kefee, which won the Best Collaboration category at the 2010 Headies Awards. On 25 June 2012, Timaya released another album titled Upgrade, which spawned hits like "Bum Bum", "Sexy Ladies", and "Malonogede". The album featured collaborations with Attitude, Terry G, and Vector. Duncan Mighty and Timaya dueted on "I Know I Know Dat", which leaked onto the internet a few hours after Duncan Mighty's album Footprints was released in stores. Both artists were honored at the fourth annual Odudu Music Awards, alongside M-Trill, Sodi Cookey, Becky Enyioma, and Timi Dakolo.

On 25 September 2014, Timaya released his fifth studio album titled Epiphany. It featured 20 tracks, being preceded by "Bow Down" and "Sanko", and 4 bonus tracks, "Ekoloma Demba", "Ukwu", "Hold Me Now" and "Bum Bum Remix" featuring Sean Paul. Outside of those, the album also included collaborations with 2Face Idibia, Patoranking, Olamide, Sir Shina Peters, Deetii, Phyno, and Terry G. The track listing for Epiphany was released on 15 September 2014. On the cover, Timaya is dressed like a Roman Catholic figure, in a cassock with a rosary, posing with a slight wink and his hands together. Al Yhusuff of tooXclusive said Epiphany met Timaya's core audience, calling it "Ukwu-phany" because of the many "bum-bum songs" and noting that it "doesn't fall below par," giving it a rating of 3 out of 5.

In 2017, Timaya performed in Nassau, where he headlined the first Afro-Soca concert. In 2018, he received his first Grammy nomination in the Best Reggae Album category. He was featured on Avrakedabra, an album by Morgan Heritage on the track titled "Reggae Night (Global Remix)". Timaya established his record label, DM Records Limited, which became home to artists like Patoranking and Runtown. In 2017, he signed the young dancehall/Afro-fusion artist King Perryy and producer Killertunes to the DM Records imprint. On 21 January 2019, he collaborated with KCee on the song "Erima."

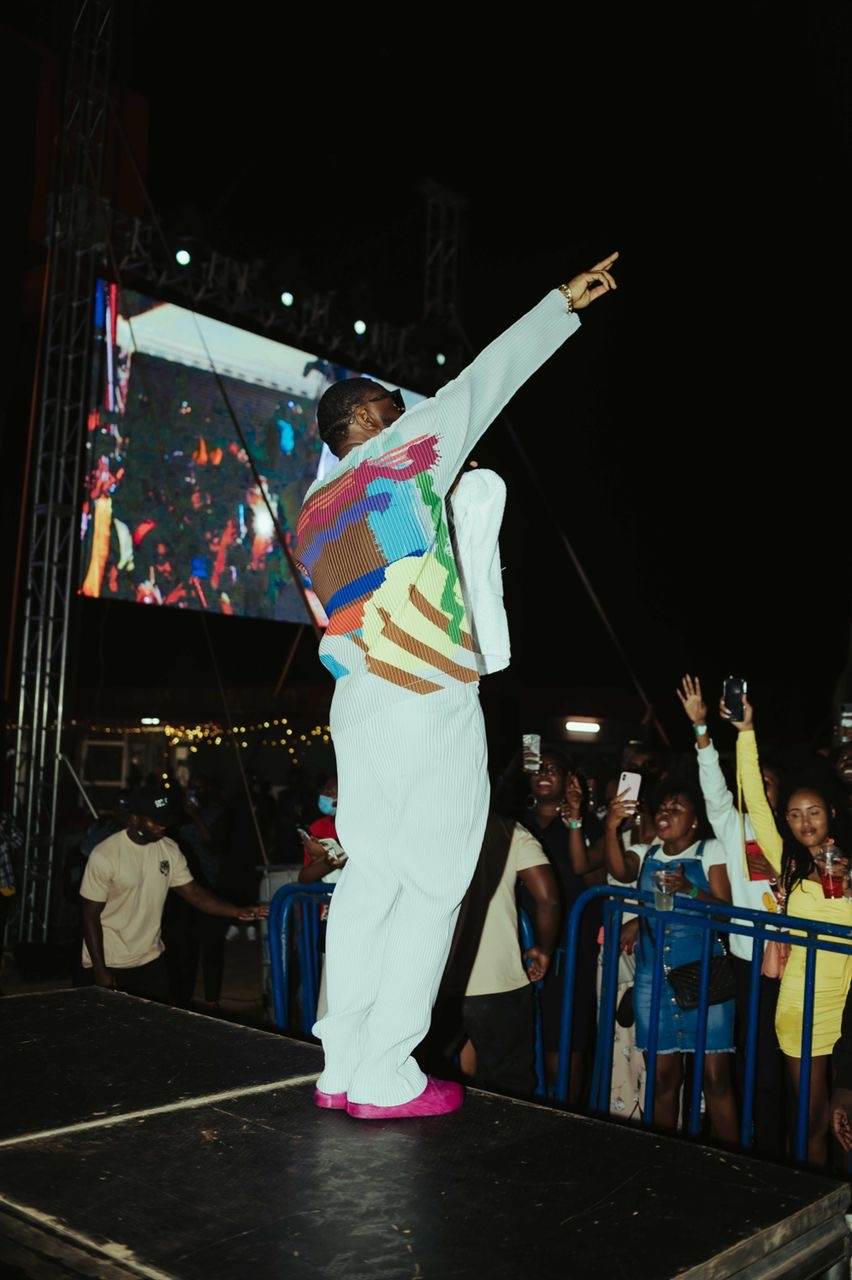
Timaya Performing for fans at a tour in Rwanda, April 2022.

=== 2019–2020: Chulo Vibes and Gratitude ===
After five years of releasing singles, albums, and touring, Timaya released an EP titled Chulo Vibes. This project featured collaborations with Tanzanian artist Alikiba, Trinidadian Soca legend Machel Montano, and Nigerian Grammy-winning artist Burna Boy. His sixth solo studio album, Gratitude, was released in 2020. The album included singles such as "Balance", "I Can't Kill Myself", "Gra Gra", "Don Dada", and "Born To Win" respectively.

=== 2023–present: Gladiator ===
In 2023, Timaya's 2022 release, "Sweet Us", became a national hit and an anthem for the 2023 general elections, after he reached an agreement with Nyesom Wike's band leader, Bamidele, who was the original creator of the song's chorus.

In 2024, Timaya released Gladiator, his eighth-studio album. During a discussion with African Folder's Ukpeme Udoh, Timaya stated that his life's challenges inspired the album.

== Honours ==
The Inter-Religious and International Federation for World Peace (IIFWP) appointed Timaya as a peace ambassador in 2011.

== Discography ==
=== Albums ===
- True Story (2007)
- Gift And Grace (2008)
- De Rebirth (2010)
- LLNP Long Life N' Prosperity (2011)
- Upgrade (2012)
- Epiphany (2014)
- Gratitude (2020)
- Gladiator (2024)

=== Extended plays ===
- Chulo Vibes (2019)

=== Selected singles ===
Year	Title	Album	Ref
2024	Mase	Non-Album Single	
2024	"In My Head" (featuring Tiwa Savage)	Non-Album Single	
2023	"Tomato"	Non-Album Single	
2022	"Charger"		
2021	"Cold Outside" (featuring Bnxn FKA Buju)		
2021	"Eff All Day" (featuring Phyno)		
2019	"2 Stoopid"	Non-album single	
2019	"I Can't Kill Myself"	Chulo Vibes	
2019	"Balance"	Chulo Vibes	
2018	"Kom Kom" (featuring King Perry and Patoranking)	Non-album single	
2018	"Bam Bam" (featuring Olamide)	Non-album single	
2018	"Ah Blem Blem" (Electric Bodega Remix)	Non-album single	
2018	"To U"	Non-album single	
2018	"Ah Blem Blem"	Non-album single	
2018	"Telli Person" (featuring Olamide and Phyno)	Non-album single	
2017	"Dance" (featuring Rudeboy)	Non-album single	
2017	"I Like the Way" (Electric Bodega Remix)	Non-album single	
2017	"Pity 4 Us"	Non-album single	
2017	"Woyo"	Non-album single	
2017	"Who Born You"	Non-album single	
2016	"Money" (featuring Flavour)	Non-album single	
2016	"Bang Bang"	Non-album single	
2016	"I Like the Way"	Non-album single	
2015	"Some More"	Non-album single	
2015	"Amayanabo"	Non-album single	
2015	"I Concur"	Non-album single	
2014	"Ukwu"	Non-album single	
2014	"Sanko"		
2014	"Lai Lai"	Epiphany	
2014	"Gbagam"	Epiphany	
2014	"Bow Down"	Epiphany	
2014	"Ekoloma Demba"	Epiphany	

=== Music collaborations ===
- Cold Outside feat BNXN
- Bum Bum remix feat Sean Paul
- Pull Up feat Burna Boy
- Malonogede feat Terry G
- Life Anagaga – MI feat Timaya.
- Reggae Night – Morgan Heritage feat Timaya & others.
- Kokoroko – Kefee feat Timaya
- O Pari – DJ Shawn feat Timaya & Falz
- Alubarika – Patoranking feat Timaya.
- Waje featuring Timaya – kpolongo.

== Videography ==
Year	Title	Director	Ref
2012	Malonogede	Gini	
2012	Bum Bum	Clarence Peters	
2012	Sexy Ladies	Clarence Peters	
2014	Ekoloma Demba	Matt Max	
2014	Watta Bam Bam	Godfather Productions	
2014	Ukwu	Moe Musa	
2014	Bum Bum Remix	Shuta Films	
2014	Bow Down	Unlimited L.A	
2014	Sanko	Unlimited L.A	
2014	Gbagam	Clarence Peters	
2015	Hallelujah	Matt Max	
2015	Some More	Uprooted Media	
2015	Hallelujah	Matt Max	
2015	I Concur	Clarence Peters	
2015	I Like The Way	UpRooted Media	
2015	Money	Clarence Peters	
2016	Bang Bang	Patrick Elis	
2016	Woyo	Unlimited L.A	
2016	Dance	Clarence Peters	
2017	Telli Person	Clarence Peters	
2018	Ah Blem Blem	Clarence Peters	
2018	To U	Unlimited L.A	
2018	Bam Bam	Unlimited L.A	
2018	Kom Kom	Unlimited L.A	
2019	Balance	Unlimited L.A	
2019	I Can't Kill Myself	Director K	
2019	2 Stoopid	TG Omori	
2021	Cold Outside	TG Omori	
2023	Tomato	Clarence Peters	
2024	Dey Your Dey	Masterkraft	
2024	In My Head featuring Tiwa Savage	Director Pink	
2024	Blessings Dey Come way	Masterkraft	

== Awards and nominations ==
- Afrotainment-Museke Online African Music Awards
  - 2011: Best Afro-Dancehall song, "Plantain Boy" (Won)
- Nigeria Music Awards
  - 2008: Album of the Year, True Story (Won)
- The Headies
  - 2008: Best Reggae/Dancehall Album, True Story (Won)
  - 2009: Best Reggae/Dancehall Album, Gift and Grace (Won)
  - 2009: Best Collaboration, "Good or Bad" (with J. Martins and P-Square) (Won)
  - 2009: Artiste of the Year (Nominated)
  - 2010: Best Collaboration, "Kokoroko" (with Kefee) (Won)
- Nigeria Entertainment Awards
  - 2014: Indigenous Artist of the Year (Nominated)
- AFRIMMA
  - Afrimma 2015 Best Dancehall Artist (Nominated)
  - Afrimma 2016 Best Dancehall Act of the Year (Nominated)
  - Afrimma 2017 Dancehall Act of the Year (Won)
  - Afrimma 2018 Best African Reggae/Dancehall Act (Nominated)
- Grammy 2018
  - Morgan Heritage's Reggae Night (Global Remix) off the album Avrakedabra

== Tours ==
- 2021 – Timaya US Tour.
- 2019 – Timaya Chulo Vibes Europe Tour.
- 2018 – Timaya Live in Canada.
- 2017 – Timaya US Tour.

== See also ==
- List of people from Port Harcourt
- List of Nigerian musicians
