= Mayorkun =

Nigerian musician (born 1994)

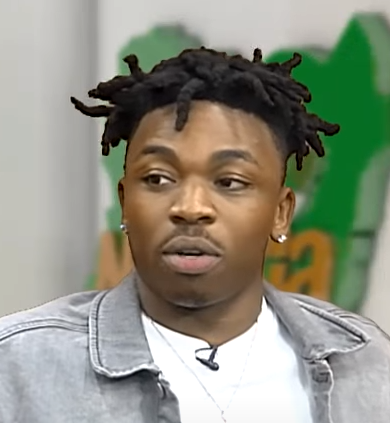
- Mayorkun chatting with Wazobia Max TV in June 2018

Background information
- Also known as: Mayor of Lagos, MOL, Mayor of lay lay
- Born: Adewale Mayowa Emmanuel; 23 March 1994 (age 32)
- Origin: Osun State, Nigeria
- Genre: Afrobeats
- Occupations: Singer; songwriter; pianist
- Instruments: Vocals; piano
- Years active: 2016–present
- Label: Sony Music West Africa • DMW (former)
- Website: www.mayorkun.com

Adewale Mayowa Emmanuel (born 23 March 1994), known professionally as Mayorkun, is a Nigerian singer, songwriter, pianist and dancer. He released a cover of Davido's "The Money" single and was discovered by the singer on Twitter. Mayorkun was signed to Davido's record label DMW from 2016 to 2021; his debut single "Eleko" was released under the label. Mayorkun released his debut studio album The Mayor of Lagos in November 2018. After his exit from DMW in 2021; he released "Let Me Know" and his second studio album Back in Office in October 2021, under the Sony Music West Africa division.

== Early life ==
Mayorkun was born on 23 March 1994 in Lagos, Nigeria. He is the first child of three. He is Christian.

== Music career ==
Mayorkun decided to leave his bank job to search for another job due to bad pay, when his cover video was spotted by Davido in February 2016. Davido followed him on Twitter and Instagram, after which Davido asked him if he could do more than play the keyboard. He got a call from Davido the same day he wrote his resignation letter and sent Davido some of the songs he already recorded. Davido decided to sign him to Davido Music Worldwide. Mayorkun released his first single under the label called "Eleko" in 2016. The song debuted at number 9 on the Nigeria Playdata charts, on 1 May 2016, and reached number 5, on 28 May 2016. The video of the song gathered a million views in the first 10 days. To his name, Mayorkun has several singles including Yawa, Sade, Che Che, and Mama. In October 2018, he released singles "Posh" and "Fantasy" featuring Olu Maintain in anticipation of his first studio album titled The Mayor of Lagos. The Mayor of Lagos was released on the 16th of November, 2018. On December 1, 2018, it appeared on the Billboard World Albums chart, peaking at number 15.

In 2020, he was among the artistes scheduled for performance at the Convention center of the Eko Hotel and suites, Victoria Island, Lagos for the 2020 vanguard personality awards. Other scheduled artists included Tekno, Timaya and several others.

=== The Mayor of Lagos concert ===
Mayorkun embarked on a nationwide tour in 2017 that saw him perform in over 35 schools. He ended the year 2017 with his first headline concert in Lagos called "The Mayor of Lagos". The Mayor of Lagos concert continued in 2018 with a show in the city of Ibadan and the federal capital territory, Abuja. Additionally, a date for a Lagos edition was announced. In 2018, Mayorkun did a tour of the UK alongside label mate Dremo, where he performed in approximately six cities. He also performed alongside label boss Davido at the Wireless Festival.

=== Exit from DMW, and Back In Office ===
In 2021, during the release party of his second album Back In Office, Mayorkun disclosed his departure from DMW. In an interview with Ebuka Obi-Uchendu, both Davido and Mayorkun revealed the news to fans at his album launch event. The studio album Back In Office, was released through Sony Music's West Africa division in Nigeria on 29 October 2021.

=== Love For Free EP ===
On October 13, Mayorkun released his new single "Low Key", following the release of "For Daddy", and served as a teaser for his EP titled Love For Free.

On July 31, 2026, Mayorkun reunited with Davido on the song "B4 B4," which also featured Nigerian singer Fola and appeared as the seventh track on Davido's sixth studio album, Oriadé. Mayorkun announced the collaboration on his Instagram page on July 29, 2026, captioning a promotional photo with Davido "New Music! This Friday! 'B4 B4' #Oriade," to which Davido responded, "WE BACK." The song marked the first musical reunion between Mayorkun and Davido since Mayorkun departed Davido's record label, Davido Music Worldwide (DMW), in 2021 to pursue his career as an independent artist; the pair had previously collaborated on songs including "Prayer" (2017), "Mind" (2018), "Bobo" (2018), "Betty Butter" (2020), "The Best" (2020), and "Cho Cho" (2021).

== Discography ==
=== Studio albums and EPs ===
- The Mayor of Lagos (2018)
- Geng (EP) (2020)
- Back in Office (2021)
- Still the Mayor (2025)

=== Selected singles ===
Year	Title	Album
2016	"Eleko"	Non-album singles
2016	"Yawa"	Non-album singles
2016	"Love You Tire" (featuring Mr Eazi)	Non-album singles
2017	"Sade"	Non-album singles
2017	"Mama"	The Mayor of Lagos
2017	"Che Che"	The Mayor of Lagos
2018	"Bobo" (featuring Davido)	The Mayor of Lagos
2018	"Posh"	The Mayor of Lagos
2018	"Fantasy"	The Mayor of Lagos
2018	"Sope"	Non-album singles
2019	"Hustlers Anthem"	Non-album singles
2019	"True" (featuring Kizz Daniel)	Non-album singles
2019	"Up to Something"	Non-album singles
2020	"Geng"	Non-album singles
2020	"Of Lagos"	Non-album singles
2020	"Betty Butter" (featuring Davido)	Non-album singles
2020	"Your Body"	Non-album singles
2021	"Let Me Know"	Back in Office
2021	"Back in Office"	Back in Office
2021	"Holy Father" (featuring Victony)	Back in Office
2022	"Certified Loner (No Competition)"	Non-album singles
2022	"Maitama" (featuring Ch'coo)	Non-album singles
2022	"Oshey Boys"	Non-album singles
2022	"Alarm"	Non-album singles
2023	"For Daddy"	Love... For Free
2024	"Under The Canopy"	Non-album single
2024	"Innocent" (featuring Fireboy DML)	Still the Mayor
2025	"Reason 2 Japa"	Still the Mayor

== Awards and nominations ==
Year	Event	Prize	Result	Ref
2016	The Headies	Rookie of the Year	Won	
2016	City People Entertainment Awards	Most Promising Act	Won	
2016	City People Entertainment Awards	Best New Act	Nominated	
2016	Nigerian Teen Choice Awards	Choice New Song of the Year	Won	
2017	Nigeria Entertainment Awards	Best New Act	Won	
2017	City People Entertainment Awards	Best Music Cover	Won	
2018	City People Entertainment Awards	Artiste of the Year	Won	
2018	The Headies	Next Rated	Won	
2019	The Headies	Best R&B/Pop Album for The Mayor of Lagos	Won	
2019	The Headies	Hip Hop World Revelation	Won	
2021	Net Honours	Most Played Pop Song - "The Best" featuring Mayorkun	Nominated	
