= List of songs recorded by P-Square =

The following is a list of songs by P-Square organized by alphabetical order. The songs on the list are all included in official label-released albums, soundtracks and singles, but not white label or other non-label releases. Next to the song titles is the album, soundtrack, or single on which it appears. Remixes and live versions of songs are listed as bullet points below the original song, but clean, explicit, a cappella and instrumental tracks are not included.

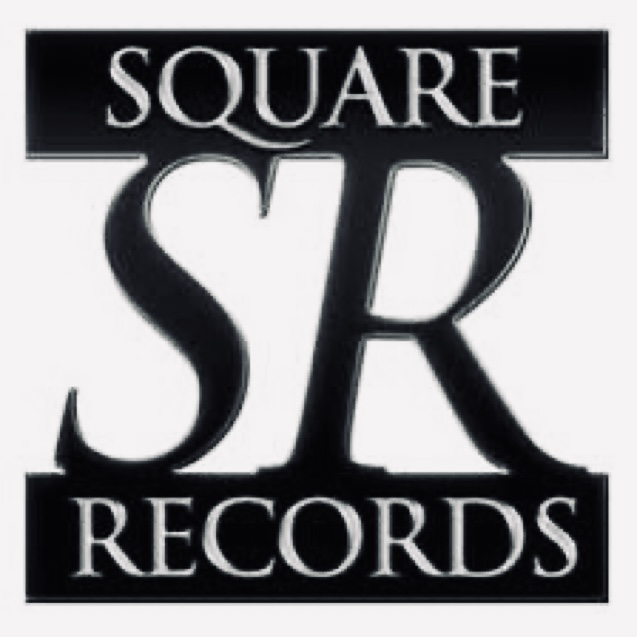
Square Records Logo.

Contents:	Top - 0-9 A B C D E F G H I J K L M N O P R S T W Y External links

== A ==
1. "Away" (Non-album single, 2017)
2. "Alingo" (Greatest Hits, 2013)
3. "Am I Still That Special Man?" (Game Over, 2007)
4. "Anything" (P-Square) (The Invasion, 2011)
5. "Asamkpokoto" (The Invasion, 2011)

== B ==
1. "Bad Boy" (Last Nite, 2003)
2. "Bank Alert" (Non-album single, 2016)
3. "Beautiful Onyinye" (The Invasion, 2011)
4. "Beautiful Onyinye" featuring Rick Ross (Greatest Hits, 2013)
5. "Bizzy Body" (Get Squared, 2005)
6. "Break It" (Danger, 2009)
7. "Bring It On" featuring Dave Scott (Double Trouble, 2014)
8. "Bunieya Enu" (The Invasion, 2011)
9. "Bye Bye" (Danger, 2009)

== C ==
1. "Chop My Money" featuring Akon & May D (Greatest Hits, 2013)
2. "Chop My Money" featuring May D (The Invasion, 2011)
3. "Collabo" featuring Don Jazzy (Double Trouble, 2014)

== D ==
1. "Danger" (Danger, 2009)
2. "Dat Tin" (Last Nite, 2003)
3. "Do As I Do" featuring Tiwa Savage and May D (The Invasion, 2011)
4. "Do Me" featuring Waje (Game Over, 2007)

== E ==
1. "E Don Happen" (Get Squared, 2005)
2. "E No Easy" featuring J.Martins (The Invasion, 2011)
3. "E No Good" (Last Nite, 2003)
4. "Ejeajo" featuring T.I. (Double Trouble, 2014)
5. "Enemy Solo" featuring Awilo Longomba (Double Trouble, 2014)

== F ==
1. "Find Somebody" (Non-album single, 2022)
2. "Fire" (The Invasion, 2011)
3. "Forever" (The Invasion, 2011)

== G ==
1. "Game Over" (Game Over, 2007)
2. "Get Squared" (Get Squared, 2005)
3. "Gimme Dat" (Danger, 2009)

== I ==
1. "I Love You" (Danger, 2009)
2. "Ifeoma" (Double Trouble, 2014)
3. "Ifunanya" (Game Over, 2007)
4. "Igbedu" (Last Nite, 2003)
5. "Ije Love" (Double Trouble, 2014)

== J ==
1. "Jaiye (Ihe Geme)" (Non-album single, 2022)
2. "Jeje" featuring Waje (The Invasion, 2011)

== K ==
1. "Kolo" (Last Nite, 2003)

== L ==
1. "Last Nite" (Last Nite, 2003)
  - "Last Nite (Remix)" (Last Nite, 2003)

== M ==
1. "Magical Healing" (Non-album single, 2013)
2. "Mako Fiesta" (Last Nite, 2003)
3. "Me and My Brother" (The Invasion, 2011)
4. "Miss U Die" (Game Over, 2007)
5. "Missing You" (Double Trouble, 2014)
6. "MMS (Mugu Money Spender)" (Double Trouble, 2014)
7. "More Than A Friend" (Game Over, 2007)

== N ==
1. "No One Like You" (Game Over, 2007)
2. "No Be Joke" (Double Trouble, 2014)
3. "Nobody Ugly" (Non-album single, 2017)

== O ==
1. "Oga Police" (Get Squared, 2005)
2. "Ogadigide" (Double Trouble, 2014)
3. "Ole Buruku" (The Invasion, 2011)
4. "Omoge Mi" (Get Squared, 2005)

== P ==
1. "Personally" (Double Trouble, 2014)
2. "Player" (The Invasion, 2011)
3. "Possibility" featuring 2Face Idibia (Danger, 2009)

== R ==
1. "Roll It" (Game Over, 2007)

== S ==
1. "Sari Sari" (Double Trouble, 2014)
2. "Say Your Love" (Get Squared, 2005)
3. "Senorita" (Last Nite, 2003)
4. "Shake It Down Low" featuring Muna and Eva Alordiah (The Invasion, 2011)
5. "She's Hot" featuring Naeto C (The Invasion, 2011)
6. "Shekini" (Double Trouble, 2014)
7. "Stand Up" (Game Over, 2007)
8. "Story" (Get Squared, 2005)
9. "Super Fans" (Danger, 2009)

== T ==
1. "Temptation" (Get Squared, 2005)
2. "Trowey!" (Danger, 2009)

== W ==
1. "Who Dey Here?" (Danger, 2009)
2. "Why E Be Say" (Game Over, 2007)

== Y ==
1. "Your Name" (Get Squared, 2005)
  - "Your Name (Remix)" (Get Squared, 2005)

== Z ==
1. "Zombie" featuring Jermaine Jackson (Double Trouble, 2014)
