= MTV Africa Music Awards 2010 =

Edition of annual music event

MTV Africa Music Awards
- Date: 20 November 2010
- Location: Lagos, Nigeria
- Country: Africa
- Presented by: Eve

The 2010 Edition of MTV Africa Music Awards were held on Saturday, December 11, 2010 in Lagos, Nigeria. The show was hosted by American rapper Eve.

== Winners & nominees ==
=== Best Video ===
- Fally Ipupa - Sexy dance (DRC)
- P-Square f/t J. Martins- E No Easy (Nigeria)
- The Parlotones - Life Design (South Africa)
- Banky W - Strong Ting (Nigeria)

=== Brand:New ===
- Mo'Cheddah (Nigeria)
- Diamond Platnumz (Tanzania)
- Muthoni (Kenya)
- JoJo (Gabon)

=== Artist of The Year ===
- 2 Face (Nigeria)
- P-Square (Nigeria)
- Jozi (South Africa)
- Fally Ipupa (DRC)

=== Song Of The Year ===
- Liquideep - Fairytale (South Africa)
- D'Banj - Fall In Love (Nigeria)
- JR - Show Dem (South Africa)
- Banky W - Lagos Party (Nigeria)

=== Best Anglophone ===
- Daddy Owen feat Dunco and Kera (Kenya)
- Sarkodie (Ghana)
- Wande Coal (Nigeria)
- Big Nuz (South Africa)

=== Best Francophone ===
- Fally Ipupa (DRC)
- Awadi (Senegal)
- DJ Arafat (Ivory Coast)
- Ba Ponga (Gabon)

=== Best Lusophone ===
- Cabo Snoop (Angola)
- Lizha James (Mozambique)
- Paul G (Angola)
- Dama Do Bling (Mozambique)

=== Best Group ===
- P-Square (Nigeria)
- Radio & Weasel (Uganda)
- Teargas (South Africa)
- P-Unit (Kenya)

=== Best Female ===
- Sasha (Nigeria)
- Lizha James (Mozambique)
- Nneka (Nigeria)
- Barbara Kanam (DRC)

=== Best Male ===
- 2Face (Nigeria)
- Fally Ipupa (DRC)
- Black Coffee (South Africa)
- Wande Coal (Nigeria)

=== Best International ===
- Eminem (USA)
- Rihanna (Barbados)
- Drake (Canada)
- Rick Ross (USA)

=== MAMA Legend ===
- Miriam Makeba (South Africa)

== MAMA 2010 Performers ==
Announced to date:

- 2Face (Nigeria)
- Banky W (Nigeria)
- Barbara Kanam (DRC)
- Big Nuz (South Africa)
- Cabo Snoop (Angola)
- Daddy Owen (Kenya)
- Diamond (Tanzania)
- Eve (USA)
- Fally Ipupa (DRC)
- J. Martins (Nigeria)
- Jozi (South Africa)
- Liquideep (South Africa)
- Lizha James (Mozambique)
- Mo Cheddah (Nigeria)
- Paul G (Angola)
- P-Unit (Kenya)
- The Parlotones (South Africa)
- Public Enemy (USA)
- Radio & Weasel (Uganda)
- Rick Ross (USA)
- Sarkodie (Ghana)
- Sasha (Nigeria)
- T-Pain (USA)
- Teargas (South Africa)
- Wande Coal (Nigeria)

== 2010 Sponsors ==
The 2010 MTV Africa Music Awards was sponsored by Airtel in association with MasterCard. The MTV Africa Music Awards with Airtel is also supported by Arik Air and the Lagos State Government.
