= Wahu =

Kenyan singer-songwriter (born 1980)

- Born: Rosemary Wahu Kagwì; March 22, 1980 (age 46); Nairobi, Kenya
- Genres: Afropop; R&B
- Occupation: Singer-songwriter
- Years active: 1998 to present
- Label: Ogopa Deejays (former)
- Spouse: Nameless (m. 2005)

Rosemary Wahu Kagwì, (born March 22, 1980) professionally known by her mononym Wahu, is a Kenyan singer-songwriter, former fashion model, actress, and entrepreneur.

== Early life and education ==
Wahu attended Hospital Hill Primary School and proceeded to Precious Blood High School, which is located at Riruta. While in school, she wrote her first song. She is a former model and University of Nairobi student, graduating with a degree in Bachelor of Arts in Mathematics and Communication.

== Career ==
Wahu started her musical career in 2000. She released her first single "Niangalie" which received positive reception across Africa and internationally. Her first three singles were "Niangalie", "Esha" and "Liar". Wahu released her first major hit, "Sitishiki" around 2005. Some of her music has been produced by the Ogopa DJs. Wahu has entertained audiences alongside many Kenyan and African Artistes like Kleptomaniacs, Fally Ipupa, Nonini, Nameless, Wyre, Qqu, and P-Unit. She is the inaugural recipient of the MTV Africa Music Awards 2008, for the Best Female Artist category. Moreover, she has won the Pearl of Africa Music Awards, Chaguo La Teeniez Awards and Kisima Music Awards. In the acting industry, Wahu had a leading role in the television series Tazama. In 2017 she released a new gospel song "Sifa". In 2013, she launched her salon business, Afrosiri Salon, which offers services such as spa, hair, manicure, and pedicure services.

== Personal life ==
She is married to David Mathenge alias Nameless, another award-winning Kenyan musician. They have three daughters. She dedicated her biggest hit to date "Sweet Love" to her first born daughter, Tumiso.

== Awards and nominations ==
=== Awards ===
- MTV Africa Music Awards 2008 – Best Female
- 2008 Pearl of Africa Music Awards – Best Female Artist (Kenya)
- 2008 CHAT Awards – Favourite Female Artiste
- 2008 Kisima Awards – Best Song ("Sweet Love") & Best Reggae Artiste/Group
- 2010 Tanzania music awards – Best Reggae Song ('Leo (Reggae remix)' with AY)

=== Nominations ===
- 2006 Pearl of Africa Music Awards – Best Kenyan Female Artiste
- MTV Africa Music Awards 2008 – Best Newcomer
- 2008 MOBO Awards – Best African Act
- 2008 Kora Awards – Best Artiste or Group from East Africa (not yet held)
- 2009 Tanzania Music Awards – Best East African Song ("Sweet Love")
- 2009 MTV Africa Music Awards – Best Video ("Little Things You Do" with Bobi Wine)
- 2009 Channel O Music Video Awards – Best African East & Best Ragga Dancehall Video ("Sweet Love")
- 2011 Tanzania Music Awards – Best Song and Best Collaboration Song ('Mkono Mmoja' with Chege & Temba)
