= Necessary Noize =

Kenyan hip hop group

Necessary Noize was a Kenyan hip hop group.

== Band members and career ==
It was originally composed of female MC/singer Nazizi Hirji, singer Kevin Wyre and rapper Bamzigi, though Bamzigi later left due to personal and label disputes. The group was formed in October 2000 and released their self-titled debut album in 2000 under Audio Vault Studios (now Blu Zebra). This contained the hits "Clang Clang," and "La Di Da."

They were later to release a second album Necessary Noize II: Kenyan Gal, Kenyan Boy in 2004 which included popular regional hits such as "Kenyan Gal, Kenyan Boy" and "Bless My Room" . Although mainly hip hop based, the group also does some reggae and R&B tracks. They are appreciated for their socially conscious lyrics that deal with issues affecting youth such as AIDS, drugs and politics.

== Collaborations ==
Together with Ugandan ragga musician Bebe Cool, they have released music under the name East Africa Bashment Crew. The group is nominated at the inaugural (2008) MTV Africa Music Awards. Necessary Noize has also collaborated with the Tanzanian hip hop group Gangwe Mobb with "Tunajirusha" hit. Guests on their debut album include Mizchif from Zimbabwe, Jerry Doobiez of K-South and Nyota Ndogo.

== Awards ==
Won:

- 2004 Kisima Music Awards - Best Group & Best Music Video ("Kenyan Gal/Boy") and Best Ragga Group.
- 2004 Chaguo La Teeniez Awards
- 2006 Pearl of Africa Music Awards (PAM Awards) - Best Group (Kenya)

Nominated:

- 2005 Tanzania Music Awards - Best East African Album ("Necessary Noize II")
- 2006 Channel O Music Video Awards - Best reggae video ("Kenyan Gal/Boy")
- 2007 Pearl of Africa Music Awards - Best Kenyan Group.
