= Bouqui =

- Also known as: B.O.U.Q.U.I; Rap-evangelist
- Born: Bukola Folayan; 18 February 1979 (age 47); Ife, Osun State, Nigeria
- Origin: Osun, Nigeria
- Genres: Hip hop
- Occupations: Recording artist; entertainer; fashion designer; on-air personality; author
- Years active: 1995 – date
- Website: bouquisplace.com

Bukola Folayan (born 18 February 1979), professionally known as Bouqui or B.O.U.Q.U.I is a Nigerian-American rapper, singer, songwriter, on-air personality, fashion designer and author. Her debut, self-titled album, B.O.U.Q.U.I earned her the Award for Best Female Act at the 2007 Award for Music Excellence in Nigeria (AMEN), as well as nominations for Revelation of the Year and Best Rap Album at The Headies 2007. Her video for the single Take You Away, won the award for Best Mainstream Video at the 2010 Nigerian Music Video Awards (NMVA).

== Career ==
=== Early life and career beginnings ===
Bouqui was born in Wesley Guild, Ilesha, Osun state to Oba Ololade Folayan I, her father, a traditional ruler and professor of biochemistry and her mother Esther Olufemi, a professional teacher. She grew up alongside her five siblings at the Obafemi Awolowo University staff quarters. While in the university, Bouqui founded an all-girl group, G-vibes.

=== Solo career and B.O.U.Q.U.I ===
She began her solo career in 1999, taking on the moniker, Bouqui, which is an acronym for, "Born Once More Unto A Quickened And Unparalleled Image". She gained notoriety with the release of the singles, Molejo, Vanity and Get it Started off her debut 2007 album, B.O.U.Q.U.I, which featured on charts in the United Kingdom; with the single, Get it Started debuting at number one on the backyard beats segment of the World Chart Show, hosted by PJ Butta, which was the first by a Nigerian based artiste.

The album, B.O.U.Q.U.I was nominated for Best Rap Album at The Headies 2007, as well as Hip Hop World Revelation of the Year. It also won her the award for Best Female Act at the AMEN Awards, also in 2007. Bouqui was featured on DJ Jimmy Jatt's track Too Much, which also featured Sasha P, Blaise and Kemistry.

Following her album release, Bouqui embarked on a 15 city tour of the United Kingdom.

=== Redefinition ===
Ahead of the release of her sophomore album, Redefinition, in 2009, Bouqui released the singles, Mo ri le and Take You Away featuring Four Kornerz to critical acclaim, winning the award for Best Mainstream Video at the 2010 Nigerian Music Video Awards (NMVA) for the video for Take You Away. The Redefinition Album was produced, mixed and mastered in the UK by JJC Skillz and Mix Master Jay for her record label, Bouqui's Place Entertainment.

Bouqui embarked on the Redefinition Tour, touring cities in the United States and Canada. She also organized the Redefinition Campus Storm, which took her to various university campuses in Nigeria, including her alma mater, Obafemi Awolowo University, where her concert had a recorded attendance of 15,000.

Bouqui won the awards for Best Female Act and Best Video at the Women in Entertainment and Arts Awards in the UK in 2009.

=== 2011 to present: Double Album and other releases ===
In November 2011, Bouqui released Igbeyinloju, a remake of King Sunny Adé's hit song of the same title from the 1980s, produced by Jerry Metz.

In February 2013, Bouqui featured American rapper, Da' T.R.U.T.H. on her single, Celebrate, which was ranked #22 on the Top Gospel Songs on 2013. She collaborated with him on his Love, Hope and War Tour across the United States, and riding on the platform set up by Bouqui's Redefinition Campus Storm, the Love, Hope and War Tour was brought to Nigerian campuses, drawing performances from several notable gospel artistes like, Sammie Okposo, Nikki Laoye, Tim Godfrey and Eben.

In March 2013, Bouqui announced in a joint press release by her record label, Bouqui's Place Entertainment and US-based record label Xist Music, that she had been signed as the first African artiste and first female act to Xist Music. Xist Music, which also had Grammy nominated rapper, Da' T.R.U.T.H. on its books also announced that Bouqui would head, Xist Africa, which would be based in Nigeria, and that she would be releasing a double album under the Xist Music imprint tagged Marks of a General and Eve Of Independence.

Bouqui relocated to the United States in February 2014 and in June 2015, she released the single Unstoppable produced by US-based producer, Dapo Torimiro. In collaboration with Dapo Torimiro, she organized the Unstoppable Rap Competition for aspiring musicians. Gr8man won the competition, with Limoblaze and Angeloh, the 2nd and 1st runners up respectively. Bouqui would feature Angeloh in her 2018 single, King David.

In 2017, Bouqui would again collaborate with Dapo Torimiro, to produce the single, Underground, which released ahead of her fifth studio album, titled, Bouqui Unstoppable. The album was released in November 2018 with an album listening party in Lagos, Nigeria. All tracks in the EP featured Angeloh and were produced by 'Q' and mixed & mastered by Mix Master Jay.

In August of 2023, Bouqui released a refix of Chris Falson's 1992 worship anthem, "All Honour", made popular by contemporary Christian artiste, Ron Kenoly. The single was rechristened, "For Fire" and features Chris Falson, the original author of the song.

== Other endeavors ==
In March 2019, Bouqui was ordained as a Reverend in the United States and is presently the youth pastor of Victory Christian Fellowship in Delaware.

In 2020, during the COVID-19 lockdown, Bouqui began hosting an Instagram Live session titled, Bouqui's Place, where she has interviewed notable Nigerian celebrities including MI Abaga, Waje, Stella Damasus, Ruggedman and more.

Bouqui published her first book in April 2022, titled My Naked Parts.

In May 2022, she became the first notable African rapper to obtain an academic doctorate degree, when she graduated with a PhD in Marketing, Advertising and Faith-based Initiative from HBI University, Connecticut. She also obtained a diploma in Leadership Principles from Harvard Business School.

== Awards and recognition ==
Year	Event	Prize	Recipient	Result
2007	Award for Music Excellence in Nigeria (AMEN).	Best Female Act	B.O.U.Q.U.I. (Album)	Won
2007	The Headies 2007	Best Rap Album	B.O.U.Q.U.I. (Album)	Nominated
2007	The Headies 2007	Revelation of the Year	Bouqui	Nominated
2009	Women in Entertainment and Arts Awards, UK	Best Act	Bouqui	Won
2009	Women in Entertainment and Arts Awards, UK	Best Video	Take You Away (Video)	Won
2010	Nigerian Music Video Awards (NMVA).	Best Mainstream Video	Take You Away (Video)	Won
2010	Change Agents Awards	Best Change Agent	Bouqui	Won
2010	Women in Entertainment and Arts Awards, UK	Best Female Act	Bouqui	Won
2010	2010 Nigeria Entertainment Awards	Gospel Artiste of the Year	Bouqui	Nominated
2013	Crystal Awards.	Best Collaboration	Sokutoyoyo feat. Henrisoul (Single)	Won
2013	2013 Nigeria Entertainment Awards	Gospel Artiste/Group of the Year	Bouqui	Nominated

== Discography ==
Studio albums

- B.O.U.Q.U.I (2007)
- Redefinition (2009)
- Marks of a General and Eve Of Independence (2013)
- Bouqui Unstoppable (2018)

Notable singles

- Molejo (2007)
- Vanity (2007); produced by ID Cabasa
- Mo ri le (2009)
- Take You Away (2009) featuring Four Kornerz
- Sokutuyoyo (2012) featuring Henrisoul and produced by Sam Klef

As a featured artiste

- Too Much by DJ Jimmy Jatt featuring Bouqui, Blaise, Sasha P and Kemistry
- Alheri (Remix) by Solomon Lange featuring Bouqui

== Videography ==
Year	Title	Choreographer	Director
2006	"Molejo (Reloaded)"	Bouqui	Tunji Oyewo
2009	"Take You Away"	Bouqui/Four Kornaz	Big Boyz
2009	"Morile"	JJC Skillz	JJC Skillz
2010	"Oluwa"	Bouqui/Cobhams Asuquo	JJC Skillz
2010	"Luv U Forever"	JJC Skillz	JJC Skillz
2010	"Celebrate"	Bouqui/Da'T.R.U.T.H.	Akin Alabi
2018	"King David"	Clarence Peters	Capital Dreams Pictures
2018	"Demo"	Clarence Peters	Capital Dreams Pictures
2019	"Victory Song"	Clarence Peters	Capital Dreams Pictures
