= Danger (album) =

Studio album by P-Square
- Released: 12 September 2009
- Recorded: 2007–2009
- Genre: R&B; Afropop
- Length: 61:24
- Label: Square Records
- Producer: J. Martins, Frenzy, P-Square

P-Square chronology
Game Over (2007)	Danger (2009)	The Invasion (2011)

Singles from Danger
- 1. "Danger" Released: 28 August 2009; 2. "I Love You" Released: 12 January 2010; 3. "E No Easy" Released: 16 May 2010; 4. "Gimme Dat" Released: 28 October 2010; 5. "Possibility" Released: 8 February 2011

Danger is the fourth studio album by Nigerian musical duo P-Square, released by Square Records on 12 September 2009. The album produced five singles—"Danger", "I Love You", "E No Easy", "Gimme Dat", and "Possibility". It features guest appearances from 2Face Idibia, Frenzy and J. Martins. The album's production was mostly handled by Paul "Rudeboy" Okoye, along with additional production from Frenzy, J. Martins, and Peter "Mr. P" Okoye. Danger serves as a follow-up to Game Over (2007).

== Singles ==
The album's lead single and only pre-released track, "Danger", was released on 28 August 2009. Recorded on 120 BPM, the music video for "Danger", just released a day later, was directed by Jude Engees Okoye. The video drew mixed reactions, with some critics saying it lacked the creative depth of earlier P-Square videos and comparing elements of it to Busta Rhymes' "Dangerous"; Jude Okoye dismissed the comparisons. Despite these reactions, it went on to win the award for Best Editing at the 2010 SoundCity Music Video Awards. It also received nominations for Best Duo or Group and Best Video at the same event.

The album's second single "I Love You" was released on 12 January 2010. The music video for "I Love You" was shot and directed in Nigeria by the duo's elder brother, Jude Engees Okoye. The lyrics of the song focus on love and the expression of it. The J. Martins-assisted and produced "E No Easy" was released as Danger's third single on 16 May 2010 alongside its music video. Directed by Jude Engees Okoye with a cameo appearance from ProVerb, the video won Most Gifted Duo, Group, or Featuring at the 2010 Channel O Music Video Awards. Furthermore, the video was nominated for Best Cinematography at the 2010 SoundCity Music Video Awards, and Best Video at the 2010 MTV Africa Music Awards. In 2012, a French version of the single was released with French singer Matt Houston, titled "Positif".

On 29 October 2010, the up-tempo "Gimme Dat" was released as the album's fourth single. The music video for the song was shot in South Africa by Jude Engees Okoye. The fifth and final single, "Possibility", featuring 2Face Idibia is a fusion of 2Face Idibia's "African Queen" and P-Square's "No One Like You". The black and white-themed music video for the song was directed by Jude Engees Okoye. It was filmed in South Africa and dropped on 8 February 2011.

== Critical reception ==
Kola Ayoola of Nigerian Entertainment Today mentioned that "Danger" by P-Square started off slowly with average tracks, but included some potential hits like "Danger," "Possibility," and "Super Fans." He noted that the twins' delivery and attitude on tracks such as "Bye Bye" and "Who Dey here" were impressive. Despite some drawbacks, Ayoola concluded, "it is still a good pop album," rating it 3 out of 5.

== Track listing ==
Danger track listing
No.	Title	Writer(s)	Producer(s)	Length
1.	"I Love You"	Paul and Peter Okoye	Rudeboy	4:43
2.	"Troway"	Paul and Peter Okoye	Rudeboy	4:49
3.	"Break It" (featuring Frenzy)	Paul and Peter Okoye	Mr. P	3:54
4.	"Possibility" (featuring 2 Face Idibia)	Paul and Peter Okoye; Innocent Ujah Idibia	Rudeboy	5:07
5.	"Danger"	Paul and Peter Okoye	Rudeboy	4:29
6.	"E No Easy" (featuring J. Martins)	Paul and Peter Okoye; Martins Okechukwu Justice	J. Martins	4:27
7.	"Bye Bye"	Paul and Peter Okoye	Rudeboy	3:44
8.	"Who Dey Here?"	Paul and Peter Okoye	Rudeboy	4:21
9.	"Gimme Dat"	Paul and Peter Okoye	Rudeboy	4:24
10.	"Super Fans"	Paul and Peter Okoye	Frenzy	4:33
11.	"Danger (Instrumental)"	—	Rudeboy	4:32
12.	"Troway (Instrumental)"	—	Rudeboy	4:50
13.	"Break It (Instrumental)"	—	Mr. P	3:52
14.	"E No Easy (Instrumental)"	—	J. Martins	4:29
Total length:				61:24

Notes

- "—" denotes an instrumental

== Personnel ==
- Peter Obumuneme Okoye – vocals, songwriting, production
- Paul Nonso Okoye – vocals, songwriting, production
- Innocent Ujah Idibia – vocals, songwriting
- Martins Okechukwu Justice – vocals, songwriting, production
- Emmanuel "Frenzy" Okafor — vocals, production
- Zeeno Foster — mixing, mastering, engineering
- Abel Dawey — engineering
- Kelechi Amadi — photography, design
- Side One Concepts — design
- Jude Engees Okoye – supervising production

== Release history ==
Region	Date	Format	Label
Worldwide	12 September 2009	CD, digital download	Square Records
