= Cosa Nostra: Lafamilia =

Studio album by Gazza
- Released: December 2009
- Genres: Kwaito, hip hop
- Label: Gazza Music Productions
- Producers: Kapro, Elvo

Gazza chronology
Still The King (2008)	Cosa Nostra: Lafamilia (2009)	Boss (2011)

Cosa Nostra: Lafamilia is the sixth studio album by Gazza released in 2009 under Gazza Music Productions. Most of the album was produced by the then up-and-coming producer Kapro. It includes appearances from TeQuila, Betholdt, Dama Do Bling, 4x4 Too Much Power and Mandoza among others.

The album includes the hit songs "Shukusha", "Sixxa",'"Eembwetule" and "Penduka". The video for "Shukusha" was nominated for the 2010 Channel O Music Video Awards in the category of best kwaito video. "Penduka" was nominated for the 2011 Namibian Annual Music Awards for best kwaito.

== Track listing ==
#	Title	Featured guest(s)	Producer(s)
1	"INTRO (ama 467)"		Kapro
2	"Street Life"		Elvo
3	"Sea Side"	Lil' D	Kapro
4	"Sixxa"	Blacksheep	Sixxa
5	"Natango"		Gazza
6	"Eembwetule"	4x4 Too Much Power	Gazza
7	"we Are Here"	Lil' D	Kapro
8	"Shukusha"		Kapro
9	"Nashikale Ngaho"		Kapro
10	"Murderer"	Betholdt & Dama Do Bling	Kapro
11	"Greatest MC"	Cajus	David Big Bone
12	"Revelations 3:16"	Kapro	Ponti & Mappz
13	"Penduka"	Mandoza	Kapro
14	"AJ" - skit	AJ	
15	"Cheese Boys"		Kapro
16	"Visit to the Grave"		Kapro
17	"All that I Need"	Eclipse	Chilizo
18	"Free (YDF)"	TeQuila	Kapro
