= East African Bashment Crew =

Kenyan-Ugandan reggae group

East African Bashment Crew (also known as East African Reggae Bashment Crew) is a Kenyan-Ugandan reggae group formed by Ugandan artist Bebe Cool and his contemporaries. It consists of three members, Bebe Cool from Uganda, and the Kenyan duo Necessary Noize (Kevin Wyre and Nazizi). All three were already established musicians at the time of the group's formation in 2005. While the members of the group concentrate on their main projects, East African Bashment Crew reunites every now and then.

Their song "Africa Unite" is featured in the African Rebel Music - Roots Reggae & Dancehall compilation album by Out Here Records.

== Awards ==
Won:

- 2006 Pearl of Africa Music Awards - Song of the Year ("Fire Anthem")
- 2007 Channel O Music Video Awards - Video Of The Year ("Kube")

Nominated:

- 2005 KORA Awards - Best African Reggae/Ragga Act
- 2006 Kisima Music Awards - Best Ragga & Best Reggae
- 2008 MTV Africa Music Awards - Best Group
