= SB20 =

Class of sailboat

Sportsboat SB20 ( ex:Laser SB3 )
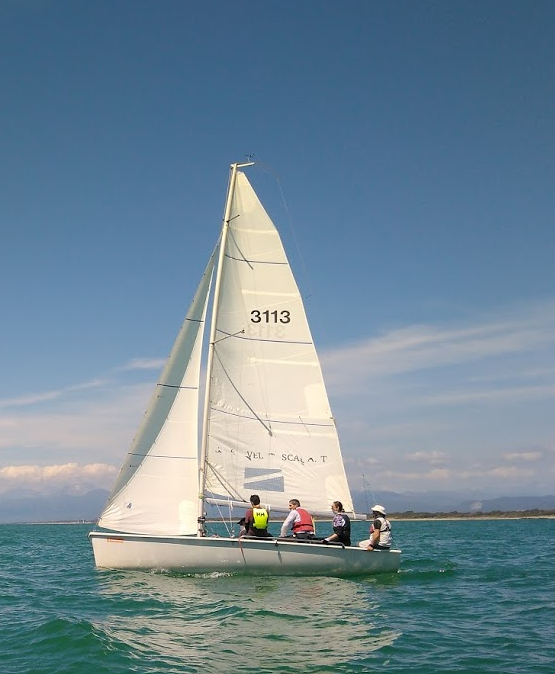

Development
- Designer: Tony Castro
- Location: UK
- Year: 2002
- No. built: >800
- Brand: Laser / Sportsboat World
- Builders: White Formula, UK
- Name: Sportsboat SB20 ( ex:Laser SB3 )

Boat
- Crew: 3 or 4
- Displacement: 685 kg (1,510 lb)
- Draft: 1.5 m (4 ft 11 in)
- Air draft: 9.05 m (29.7 ft)
- Trapeze: None

Hull
- Type: Monohull
- Construction: GRP
- LOA: 6.15 m (20.2 ft)
- Beam: 2.15 m (7 ft 1 in)
- Engine: Outboard

Hull appendages
- Ballast: 327 kg (721 lb)

Sails
- Mainsail area: 18 m^{2} (190 sq ft)
- Jib/genoa area: 9.3 m^{2} (100 sq ft)
- Gennaker area: 46 m^{2} (500 sq ft)

Racing
- RYA PN: 911

The SB20 is a one-design class of sailboat commonly used for racing. Marketed and distributed by Sportsboat World the boat was designed by Tony Castro and launched in 2002.

The SB20 was originally called the Laser SB3, and was marketed and distributed by Laser Performance under license from the designer. This licence ended in 2012.

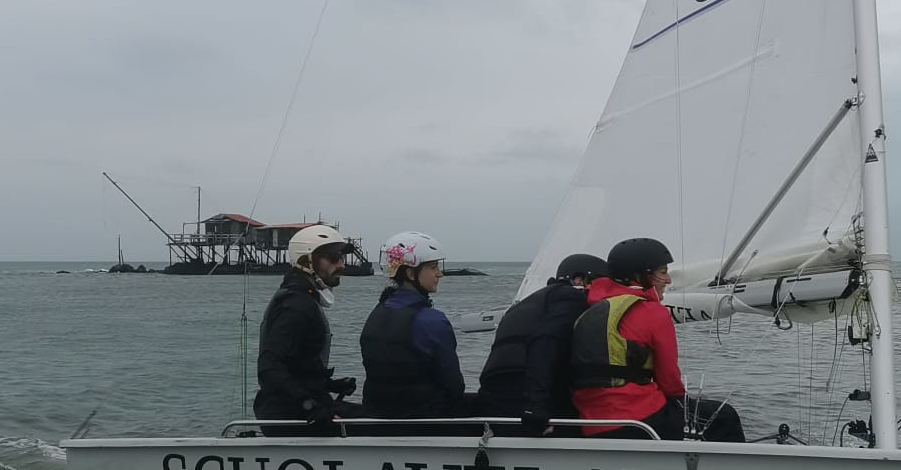
The detail of the stainless steel bar of the SB20 that does not allow hiking.

The yacht is an open keelboat, strict One-Design and is designed for racing with a crew of 3 or 4 whose maximum weight must not exceed 270 kg. With a high aspect ratio keel with a very high ballast ratio the yacht is very stable, but also quite fast due to the substantial sail area. The SB20 is unique in that it does not allow hiking, using a small stainless steel bar to prevent hiking by the crew, this allows competitive crews of all shapes, sizes and ages.

The majority of boats are located in the United Kingdom, Ireland, Portugal, Australia, France, Holland, Singapore and Italy and the class has attracted considerable support. in 2019 there is a growing fleet in the UAE and Turkey. In 2005 the SB20 became the second largest one-design fleet at the Cowes Week regatta with 66 entries. In 2006 it became the largest fleet with 102 entries pushing the XOD into second place, an accolade it held for two further years.

The Sb20 Class is also unique in that since 2018 you can rent a race-ready boat to participate in regattas.

In 2020 the first SB20 Carbon version especially built and set-up for ORC and IRC racing will be launched.

There are over 800 boats worldwide, sailed in over 20 countries. Growth in fleets internationally enabled the class to successfully apply to World Sailing for the right to host a world championship, the first of which was hosted in Dublin during 2008. Regular top quality events organised by the Sb20Class.com
