= Gimme Dat =

Gimme Dat may refer to:

- "Gimmie Dat", a 2010 song by Ciara
- "Gimme Dat" (song), a 2025 song by Ayra Starr and Wizkid
- "Gimme Dat", a 2013 song by Ice Prince
- "Gimme Dat", a song by Chingy from Hate It or Love It
- "Gimme' Dat", a song by Kreesha Turner
- "Gimme Dat", a song by P-Square from Danger

== See also ==
- "Gimme Dat Ding", a song by The Pipkins
