= 2nd Headies Awards =

Nigerian music industry awards

- Date: 17 March 2007
- Location: Muson Center, Onikan, Lagos
- Country: Nigeria
- Hosted by: D'banj and Tana
- Most awards: Paul Play (4)
- Most nominations: Paul Play (6)
- Website: theheadies.com

Television/radio coverage
- Network: HipTV

The 2nd Headies Awards, commonly known as the 2007 Hip Hop World Awards, were held on 17 March 2007, at the Muson Center. It was hosted by D'banj and Tana Adelana. Paul Play was nominated for six awards and ended up winning four.

== Winners and nominees ==
Winners are emboldened.

Best Music Video	Best Special Effects
"Temptation" – P-Square; "Olori Oko" – Infinity; "Kade" – Muma Gee; "Cry" – Mode 9; Escalade" – Darey; "Soul E Baba" – Soul E	"Why Me" – D'banj; "No Be God" – Gino; "Soul E Baba" – Soul E; "Cry" – Mode 9
Best Reggae/Dancehall Album	Best Pop Album
Versatile – Baba Dee; Let It Go – Spy Da Man; Little Patience – Majek Fashek; Conscious News – Righteousman; Reflex – Azadus; Ghetto Philosophy – Streetmonks	After the Storm – Weird MC; RunDown Funk U Up – D'banj; Naija is Blessed – Soul E; Free Soldier – Tony Tetuila; Mr Funky – Jazzman Olofin; Right and Wrong – Mr Raw
Best R&B Album	Song of the Year
Hitsville – Paul Play; From Me to You – Darey; No Drama – OJB Jezreel; Overture – Obiwon; Expressions – Styl Plus	"Why Me" – D'banj; "Angel of My Life" – Paul Play; "Obodo" – Mr Raw (feat Klint Da Drunk); "Imagine That" – Styl Plus; "Baby Konga" – Lawal Olumo; "For Instance" – 2Face Idibia; "Olori Oko" – Infinity; "Shake Something" – Jazzman Olofin
Outstanding African act	Best Rap Album
VIP; Bollie; Prae	Free at Last – FreeStyle; B.O.U.Q.U.I – Bouqui; Son of the Soil – Ikechukwu Onunaku
Best Hip Hop Collabo	Best Rap Single
"Make Dem Talk" – 2Shotz and 9ice; "Obodo" – Mr Raw (feat Klint Da Drunk); "Eko Ile" – Jazzman Olofin (feat Storm Records All Stars) (Winner); "Street Life" – Question Mark All Stars; "Bragging Rights" – Freestyle (featuring Blaise); "Rock the Party" – Tony Tetuila (featuring Sasha P); "Sip Easy" – Freestyle (feat 2Face Idibia)	"Cry" – Mode 9 (Winner); "Ruggedy Baba" – Ruggedman; "Tha Definition" – Blaise
Album of the Year	Artist of the Year
Hitsville -Paul Play (Winner); Free at Last – FreeStyle; After Da Storm – Weird MC	D'banj; Mode 9; P-Square; Weird MC; Paul Play (Winner)
Recording of the Year	Jaiye Abodunrin Next Rated
"Cry" – Mode 9; "Onyinye" – Obiwon; "Forever" – Paul Play (Winner); "Searching" – OJB Jezreel; "Streetlife" – Question Mark All Stars; "Chinwe Ike" – Resonannce	Naeto C; Overdose (Winner); Lawal Olumo; Kage; C-Mion; Gino; Blaise
Hip Hop World Revelation of the Year	Best Vocal Performance (Male)
Soul E (Winner); FreeStyle; Mr Raw; Ikechukwu Onunaku; Obiwon; Darey; Bouqui	"Forever" and "Angel of My Life" – Paul Play; "Onyinye" – Obiwon (Winner); "Lala" – Silver; "Searching" – OJB Jezreel; "Soul E Baba" – Soul E
Producer of the Year	Hall of Fame
Cobhams Asuquo – "Cry", "Street", "Dare" (Winner); Paul Play – "Hitville", "Let Them Say"; OJB Jezreel – "No Drama", "For Instance"; Don Jazzy – "Why Me", "Tongolo"	Eddy Lawani; Ben Murray-Bruce
