= Dama do Bling =

Mozambican musician

- Born: Ivânnea da Silva Mudanisse; 25 October 1979 (age 46); Maputo, Mozambique
- Genres: R&B; Hip hop
- Occupation: Singer
- Years active: 2005–present
- Label: Bang Entertainment

Ivânnea da Silva Mudanisse, known by her stage name Dama do Bling (born 25 October 1979), is a Mozambican hip hop and R&B singer, businesswoman, and philanthropist. She has been nominated for and won various awards, including from the MTV Africa Music Awards, Nigeria Entertainment Awards, and Spirit of Africa Music Video Awards.

== Biography ==
Dama do Bling was born on 25 October 1979 in Maputo. Her brother is fellow hip hop artist Hernâni da Silva. .She also has a younger sister Loide Mudanisse.She graduated with a degree from Eduardo Mondlane University, but only did a brief stint at a law office before starting her music career. She cites Da Brat, Snoop Dogg, and Eve as inspirations.

From the beginning of her career, she has works with other prominent Mozambican artists such as Lizha James, and became well known for her boldness in fashionwear and singing technique. She has had hits such as "Boy", "Cala-te Boca" (with Azagaia), and "Chamadas para Bling". She collaborated with Gazza on the song "Murderer" for his 2009 album Cosa Nostra: Lafamilia, as well as with Azagaia on his 2013 album Cubaliwa. In 2015, she appeared on Coke Studio Season 3 as part of the Peace One Day celebration in Kigali, Rwanda and collaborated with artists such as Wangechi, Ice Prince, Ali Kiba, and Ne-Yo.

In 2007, she won both the Best Southern African artist and Best Female Video award at that year's Spirit of Africa Music Video Awards for her song Dança do remexe. She was nominated for Best Female singer at the MTV Africa Music Awards 2008, and for Best Lusophone singer at the 2010 edition. She was also nominated for Southern African Artist or Group of the Year at the 2013 Nigeria Entertainment Awards.

She dated and eventually married fellow singer Valdemiro José. The two later divorced. Dama do Bling is now married again and has two children.

== Awards ==
Year	Award	Category	Nomination	Result	Ref.
2007	Spirit of Africa Music Video Awards	Best Southern African artist	"Dança do remexe"	Won	
2007	Spirit of Africa Music Video Awards	Best Female Video	"Dança do remexe"	Won	
2008	MTV Africa Music Awards	Best Female singer	Dama do Bling	Nominated	
2010	MTV Africa Music Awards	Best Lusophone singer	Dama do Bling	Nominated	
2013	Nigeria Entertainment Awards	Southern African Artist or Group of the Year	Dama do Bling	Nominated	
