= Wyre (musician) =

Kenyan musician

- Also known as: Love Child / Lion
- Born: Kevin Waire
- Origin: Kenya
- Genres: REGGAE & DANCEHALL
- Years active: 1996 - present
- Formerly of: Necessary Noize, East African Bashment Crew

Kevin Waire, best known by his stage name Wyre, is a Kenyan R&B and reggae musician. He is known for being a member of the groups Necessary Noize and East African Bashment Crew, as well as his solo career.

== Life and Career ==
He has released two solo albums. The latest album, Ten Years Wiser, was named in celebration of his 10-year career in music. As a solo artist, he has performed in various African countries, including Nigeria and Uganda. He has collaborated with various artists, including P-Square, 2Face Idibia of Nigeria. Other notable collaborations that he has done have been with Jamaica's Alaine, Cecile, and Morgan Heritage.

He is reputed for his consistence and relevance in the music industry having maintained an industry presence actively since the late 1990s. One of the ways Wyre has maintained this longevity is having several collaborations locally and internationally. Among the local Kenyan artists that he has collaborated with include Nazizi, Kidis, Prezzo, Khaligraph Jones, Vigeti, Nonini, JB Maina, Benjamin Kabaseke.

He is also known for his stage performance, alongside Ian and Qqu of N.I.X.

He previously worked as a producer at Tedd Josiah's Blu Zebra Studios. He later established his own record label, Love Child Records, where he has signed among others, Verbal, another Kenyan dance hall artist .

He attended Dagoretti High School.

== Discography ==
Solo albums:

- Definition of a Love Child (2006)
- Ten Years Wiser (2009)
- Lion (2015)
- Untitled (2025)

== Awards ==
Won:

- 2006 Kisima Music Awards - Best Ragga
- 2007 Kisima Music Awards - Best Ragga
- 2013 International Reggae and World Music Awards - Best New Entertainer
- 2015 Bingwa Music Awards - Ever Relevant Artist

Nominated:

- 2005 Kora Awards - Best East African Male Artist
- 2006 Channel O Music Video Awards - Best Afro-pop video ("Chuki") & Best R&B video ("Chuki")
- 2006 Pearl of Africa Music Awards - Best Kenyan Male Artiste
- 2007 Pearl of Africa Music Awards - Best Kenyan Male Artiste.
- 2008 Pearl of Africa Music Awards - Best Kenyan Male Artiste
