= Qqu =

Kenyan musician (born 1980)

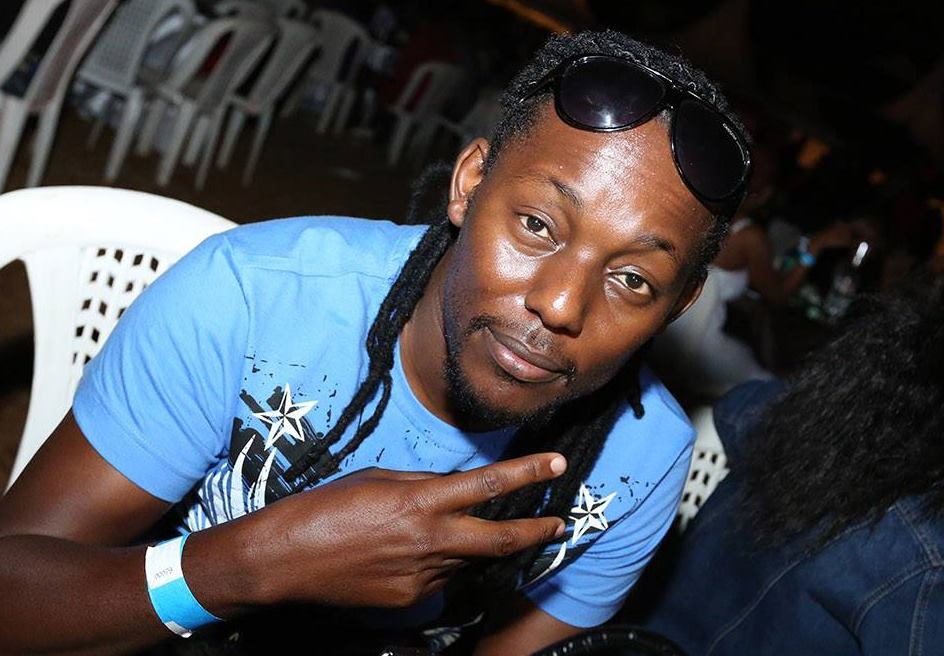
- Qqu at a recent dance event in Nairobi.

Background information
- Also known as: The Fishermans Hook, Double Cue You
- Born: Moses Qqu Odhiambo; 28 October 1980 (age 45); Nairobi, Kenya
- Genres: R&B, African hip hop, Afrofunk, Electronic
- Occupations: Socialpreneur, Singer-Songwriter, Media Strategy Consultant & Instrumentalist
- Instruments: Drums, Beatboxing, Singing, Bass Guitar
- Years active: 2003–present
- Label: Independent
- Website: Official website

Moses Qqu Odhiambo (born 28 October 1980), known commonly as Qqu, is a Kenyan singer, songwriter, choreographer, performer, instrumentalist, lifestyle entrepreneur and digital artist.

== Biography ==
Qqu was born to a Provincial Agricultural Officer father, and a mother who was an administrative clerk at Kenya Pipeline. Due to his father's duties, Qqu grew up with his mother. His four elder siblings were significantly older and thus were rarely around. Qqu led a secluded life. His brother first introduced him to music by playing beats on the dinner table. Being a fast learner, Qqu would wake early to sit at and wait at the breakfast table for his brother to arrive, so he could learn the next rhythm.

== Musical beginning ==
Qqu grew up listening to practically every form of music that he laid his hands on. Most notable collections he keeps to this day are Roger Whitaker, Diana Ross, Boney M, Amy Grant, Michael W. Smith, Sounds of Blackness, Rebecca Malope. While in primary school, Qqu was notorious for banging his desk in between lessons to make music, and this gave way to him becoming the youngest instrumentalist to join the Church choir at age 8. It was here that he felt most at home, growing in his faith and playing with great musicians such as Pete Odera, Sally Oyugi, Mary Warambo, Hellen Mtawali (whom he would later on join with as teachers at first and second edition of Tusker Project Fame alongside his fellow choreographer, Ian Wainaina). When he finished high school, Qqu was part of the initial group that formed one of Kenya's most successful dance companies (Ollovar). Alongside Ian Wainaina, they formed the group NIX and went on to record one of their most successful albums, Xaxawa.

== Music career ==
Although influenced by a myriad of musical styles, Qqu favours the dancefloor, so hip-hop, Salsa and Lingala are his greatest love. His musical tastes are for Conscious HipHop, Uptempo Lingala and Smooth Zouk. Qqu has worked with artists like annieSoul, Juliani, Freestyle Essien from Nigeria, The Villagers and others. The album was set to be released in November/December 2014. Qqu performs in English, Swahili, Luo.

2005–2006 Xaxawa

Qqu while in NIX released this album and had hits such as Beba (feat Ventura Rodriguez), Nakudanganya and one of East Africa's love ballads, Sura ya Malaika.

2007 Utado

One of 2007's best club singles, also still with NIX. This song had a twist in that both Ian and Qqu sang in their native languages (Kikuyu and Luo) and served as a unifying factor during the period before the 2008 General Elections.

2012 Hisivi

Qqu was featured on this radio hit with Wini Nkinda, a choreographer turned musician.

2012 There she goes again with Chris Adwar

A song that was set to be a free internet release.

== Live performances ==
Qqu is known for his energy on stage, having been on tour with Wyre for over three years, Dance has become a hallmark for him. Qqu is a mentor to many dance groups. Qqu has shared the stage with many artistes like P-Square, Wutah, Oliver Mtukudzi, Bebe Cool, Chameleon, Kanjii, Eric wainaina, Kevin Wyre, 2Face Idibia, TMK Wanaume, Ray C, Morgan Heritage, Jay Sean, Raghav, Mr. Vegas, Kidum, Professor Jay, AY, Nonini, Jua Cali, Amani, Wahu, Nameless, Nyota Ndogo, Redsan, Nikki, Kleptomaniax, Susan Owiyo, Hellen Mtawali, Achieng Abura, Abbas, Ukoo Fulani, Longombas, and more.

== TV appearances ==
Qqu appeared in 2013 Orange Beat Ya Street TV show on NTV(Kenya) as the Chief Judge. He was selected because of his role in pioneering the dance industry in Kenya. The show proved to be a major gaining the necessary top spot ratings in its time slot. The competition saw the winner collecting a kshs 5 million. The show featured Qqu directing the young and upcoming groups and giving them solid advice on how to push their careers in dance.

== Humanitarian work ==
An advocate for sustainable lifestyles, Qqu is an ecovangelist and worked to set up basic plastic recycling plants which are cost effective, environment friendly, and managed by locals. He is interested in hydroponics, and how water is both a scarce and wasted resource. He's the founder of the Alive campaign, which seeks to encourage mentorship in primary and high schools. He's also an advocate for NACADA and Club 254 which seek to enlighten high school students on the dangers of drugs and alcohol. He was one of the founders of Inter prisons dance championship which has the aim of giving inmates a creative outlet.

== New media strategy and content development work ==
Having actively delved in IT at the same time as he did dance and music. Moses Qqu has been involved in the shaping and creating of new media space in East and Central Africa. He is a founding member of the Design Kenya Society which is a professional design institution that draws membership from students, professional and stakeholders in the Kenyan design industry. DKS is affiliated to Network of Africa Designers and by extension, International Council of Societies of Industrial Design (ICSID). He has been involved in the shaping of Design Kenya Society and mobilization and recruitment of designers. He also currently served on the steering committee of the Art Directors and Copywriters Club of Kenya. Moses Qqu is also one of the resource persons in the review and development of undergraduate, diploma and certificate programmes at the School of The Arts and Design at the University of Nairobi. His portfolio includes orking on corporate projects for clients such as Samsung, Orange Telecom, Alcatel, Safaricom, Coca-Cola, Barclays Bank and more.

== Discography ==
=== Albums ===
- Xaxawa (NIX) (2005)
- Utado (NIX) (2007)
- Sonko (NIX) (2009)
- Alive (2011)
- Critical Mass EP (2024)

=== Singles ===
- "Kua Hivyo" (2005)
- "Beba" (2005)
- "Kixawa" (2005)
- "Nakudanganya" (2006)
- "Sura ya Malaika" (2006)
- "Utado" (2007)
- "Beat ya Mkamba" (2008)
- "Sonko" (2008)
- "Alive" (2014)

== Producer credits ==
- Chris Adwar – Xaxawa (2005)
- Clement "Razul" Mutua – Whoa (2005)
- Paul "Ulopa Ngoma" Kibukosya – Oku Gatia (2007)
- The Big Boss – Alive (2010)

== Awards ==
Won

- Best Professional Web Designer of the year Cybermatrixx Awards 2005–2007
- Best HipHop Dance Group at the Sprite Ball Face Off 2006 (DF1)

Nominated

- Nominated for best HipHop Group at the Kisima Awards 2006
- Nominated for best Bomba Male at the Kisima Awards 2007
- Nominated for best Group Kenya at the Kisima Awards 2007
- Nominated for best East African Artist at the Africa Gospel Music Awards 2011
