= Bebe Cool =

Ugandan musician (born 1977)

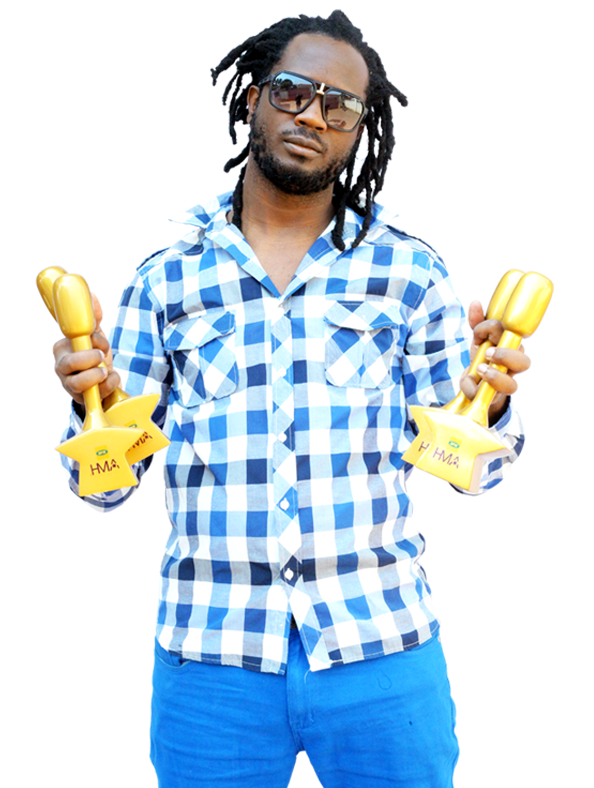
- Bebe Cool at the HiPipo Music Awards in 2014

Background information
- Also known as: Big Size
- Born: Musa Ssali; 1 September 1977 (age 49)
- Origin: Kampala, Uganda
- Occupations: Singer-songwriter, artist, record producer, actor, philanthropist
- Instrument: Vocals
- Years active: c. 1997–present
- Website: https://bebecool.co.ug/

Bebe Cool (formerly Bebe Bunton, real name Moses Ssali; born 1 September 1977) is a Ugandan reggae and ragga musician. He started his music career around 1997 in Nairobi, Kenya, but later moved back to Uganda. Cool was one of the first artists affiliated with Ogopa Deejays, a production house and record label in Kenya.

== Early life and education ==
Bebe Cool attended Aga Khan Primary School, in Kampala, Kitante Hill School, and Makerere College School, where he attended school studies, but dropped out of school one year prior to completion. At high school, he studied Physics, Chemistry, Biology, and Mathematics at Makerere College School. Bebe Cool started his music career after high school when he was an entertainment prefect.

== Music career ==
Bebe Cool is a three-time winner of the Artist of The Year Award at the Prestigious HiPipo Music Awards and won several accolades at Pearl of Africa Music Awards (PAM Awards). He was nominated for the Kora All-African Awards in 2003 and 2005. He has toured in the United Kingdom and the United States. Two of his popular singles are "Fitina" and "Mambo Mingi". He was elected as the finance minister of the Uganda National Musicians' Federation (UNMF) headed by Eddy Kenzo in 2023.

He also collaborated with Halima Namakula, a Ugandan veteran woman musician, on their crossover track "Sambagala". He released two solo albums, Maisha and Sente. His lyrics are in Luganda, Swahili, and English. Together with Kenyan duo Necessary Noize, Bebe Cool formed a reggae group known as the East African Bashment Crew. They have released one album, Fire, and two hit singles, "Africa Unite" and "Fire". The group was nominated at the MTV Africa Music Awards 2008.

In 2013, Bebe Cool had a music battle with one of Nigeria's top artists D'banj in a neutral place, Glamis Arena Harare Zimbabwe. The show was organized under the theme "Battle for Africa".

In 2014, Bebe Cool’s remade "Born in Africa remix song", a remake of the late Philly Lutaaya's song was voted among Africa’s greatest songs of all time.

The song came at number 15 in Fifty anthems for the African continent. BBC World Service listeners suggested the African songs that summed up the continent to them. This was to mark the 50th anniversary of the African Union – formerly the Organization of African Unity, From the suggestions, the BBC’s DJ Edu, who hosts a weekly African music show on BBC radio, compiled them into a special five-minute mix of 50 songs from 50 countries.

Bebe Cool has performed in the Big Brother house twice. From 2016 to 2018, there was rising controversy against him for being a chief organizer for Yoweri Kaguta Museveni, the president of Uganda who had been described by international media outlets as dictatorial. Ugandans at one time chased him off the stage in a show before he could sing.

Bebe Cool won one Afrima award for the best East African male artist in 2018.

In 2025, Bebe Cool released the song "Circumference".

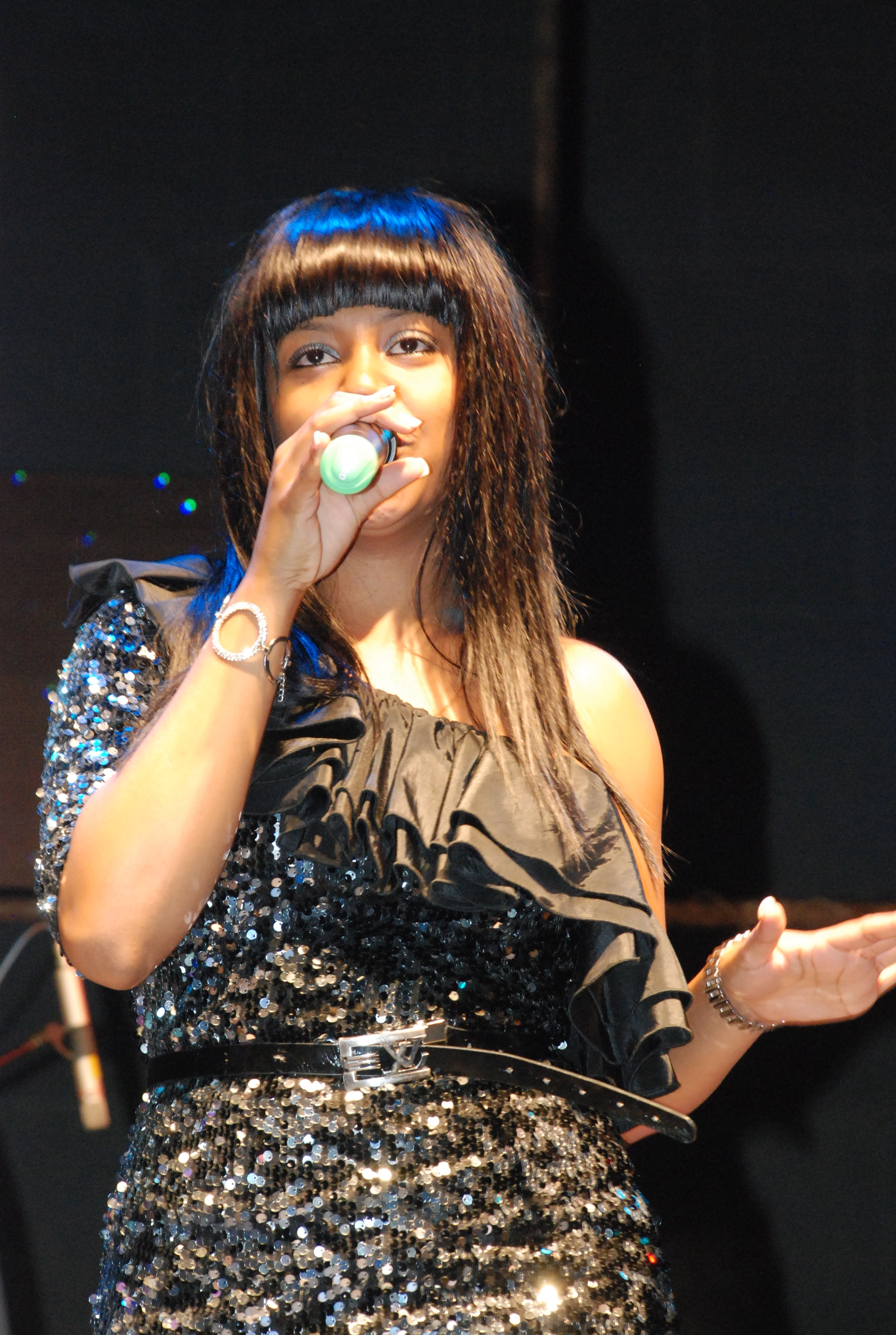
Zuena Kirema

== Personal life ==
In January 2010, Bebe Cool was injured when a policeman shot him in the leg.

On 11 July 2010, Bebe Cool was performing at the Kyadondo Rugby Club when a bomb set by Somali terrorist group al-Shabaab exploded (July 2010 Kampala attacks). According to him, Most people who died were just in front of him. "The blast was so loud—the next thing I saw were body parts flying over, he said."

Since 2002, Bebe Cool has been married to Zuena Kirema.

== Philanthropy ==
In 2008, Bebe Cool performed for the Nelson Mandela 90th Birthday Tribute in Hyde Park, London. He was also named by Nelson Mandela as one of the 46664 African ambassadors. 46664 is a campaign of raising awareness against HIV/AIDS that was initiated by the late Nelson Mandela.

On 3 August 2018, at a concert called The Golden Heart, Bebe Cool fundraised to sponsor five children with heart diseases to receive medical treatment in India.

== Political life ==
Bebe Cool supported Ugandan president Yoweri Museveni in the 2021 presidential elections in Uganda and also a member of the MK movement project

== Awards ==
Won:

- 2004 Pearl of Africa Music Awards – Best Reggae Artiste/Group
- 2005 Pearl of Africa Music Awards – Best Reggae Artiste/Group
- 2006 Pearl of Africa Music Awards – Best Reggae Artiste/Group
- 2006 Pearl of Africa Music Awards – Song of the Year
- 2007 Pearl of Africa Music Awards – Best Reggae Artiste/Group
- 2007 Pearl of Africa Music Awards – Best Male Artiste
- 2007 Channel O Music Video Awards -Video of the year
- 2008 Pearl of Africa Music Awards – Best Male Artist & Best Reggae Artiste/Group & Best Ragga Artiste/Group
- 2010 Pearl of Africa Music Awards – Artist of the Year 2010, Best Reggae Artiste/Group and Album of the year
- 2011 Pearl of Africa Music Awards – Best Male Artist
- 2013 HiPipo Music Awards – Best Reggae Song with Rema (Missing You)
- 2013 HiPipo Music Awards – Artist of the Year
- 2014 HiPipo Music Awards – Best Male REGGAE Song : Love Letter – Bebe Cool and Irene Ntale
- 2014 HiPipo Music Awards – Best Male RAGGA-DANCEHALL Song : Kokodiosis
- 2014 HiPipo Music Awards – Best on Stage Performer :
- 2014 HiPipo Music Awards – Best Artist on Social Media
- 2014 HiPipo Music Awards – Best Male Artist
- 2014 HiPipo Music Awards – Artist of the Year
- 2015 HiPipo Music Awards – Best Male REGGAE Song : Love You Everyday – Bebe Cool
- 2015 HiPipo Music Awards – Video of the Year : Love You Every - Bebe Cool
- 2015 HiPipo Music Awards – Best Concert Performance - Best of Bebe Cool Concert :
- 2015 HiPipo Music Awards – Most Active Fans Group - Gagamel Phamily :
- 2015 HiPipo Music Awards – Best Male Artist
- 2015 HiPipo Music Awards – Artist of the Year

Nominated:

- 2003 Kora Awards – Best East African Artist
- 2007 MOBO Awards
- 2011 Tanzania Music Awards – Best East African Song ('Kasepiki')
- 2013 HiPipo Music Awards – Best Reggae Song (Ntuyo Zange), Best Dancehall/Ragga Song (No Body Move), Best Musician on Social Media
- Nominated in Afrimma Awards 2014
- Australia Radio Afro Song of the Year 2015
- Nominated in Afrimma Awards 2018 " Best Male Artiste in Eastern Africa and Best African Rock categories" .

== See also ==
- Bobi wine
- Jose Chameleone
