= Obiwon =

Nigerian singer and musician

Obiora Obiwon
- Also known as: Obiora Obiwon
- Born: Obiora Nwokolobia-Agu; 9 June 1977 (age 48); Enugu, Nigeria
- Origin: Udi, Enugu State
- Genres: Urban contemporary gospel, R&B, soul, hip hop
- Occupations: Musician, singer, songwriter, minister, evangelist, event host, media consultant
- Years active: 2005–present
- Label: 3Music

Obiora Nwokolobia-Agu (born 9 June 1977), better known by his artistic name Obiora Obiwon, is a Nigerian singer, musician, songwriter, recording artist, music minister and evangelist.

== Early life ==
Obiora Obiwon was born Obiora Nwokolobia-Agu on 9 June 1977 in Enugu State, southeastern region of Nigeria. His passion for music started developing as early as age 5, while singing along to HipHop and R'n'B records from his elder brother's Audio Cassettes. His father, Sir Humphrey Nwokolobia-Agu was a folk and classical music composer and arranger from Eastern Nigeria. At age 15 he went on to songwriting, performing on the local streets and hang outs.

== Education ==
He graduated from the University of Nigeria, Nsukka (UNN) in 2001 where he studied Agricultural Extension even while building recording and live performance skills in eastern Nigeria's music circuit.

== Career ==
After migrating to Lagos in 2002 for National Youth Service Corps (NYSC), gee initially became an employee of a bank in Lagos. At the same time initial attempts at a professional recording career merged him and friends in a HipHop group called Thorobreds. It was at this point that he adopted the moniker "Obiwon", a name which a favourite uncle had fondly called him in his younger years, after a popular science fiction hero. The group made impact winning Best Rap Group at the 2005 maiden edition of Nigeria's prestigious music award show, The HipHop World Awards (now known as The Headies).

Obiwon's debut album, Overture was released in 2006. The pressures of a budding music career soon led him to resign a banking job shortly afterwards. Overture produced the now classic Nigerian hit ballad "Onyinye". He was nominated for three awards at 2007 Hip Hop World Awards, and won the Best Vocal Male Performance category. He was also honoured as Nigeria's Voice of the Decade (21st century) at the Nigeria Music Awards.

By July 2008 Obiwon revealed that he had undergone a spiritual experience and announced a transition into the Christian/Gospel music genre. His artiste name ‘Obiwon’ was also re-branded to ‘Obiora Obiwon’ to enable him create a stronger and more distinct identity for his brand. In 2009 he released his second studio album and first Christian/Gospel album The Rebirth which became noted for songs such as “F.a.t.h.e.r”, “Victorious” and “The Rebirth (Kene Gi)”. The major highlight of the album turned out to be the hit love song and wedding anthem "Obi Mu O", a song dedicated to his then wife to be. Since transiting to Christian/Gospel music, Obiwon has continued to minister at various churches, Christian and other secular events.

In 2013 Obiwon received with his first gospel music award at the National Gospel Awards as best crossover act for the song "F.a.t.h.e.r 2.0". In November 2013 he released the album Gold Water which contained notable singles "Testify", "Pour Your Love" and the urban gospel hit "Hail My King", which featured fellow notable Nigerian urban gospel acts Frank Edwards, Eben and Kenny K'ore "Gold Water" was honoured at the Crystal Awards 2014, where Hail My King received the Best Collaboration award. In the same year, Gold Water also won four awards out of five nominations at the 4th Annual Nigerian Gospel Music Awards (NGMA). The NGMA winnings were in the following categories and for the following works: Best Collaboration Song for “Hail My King”, Best Soul/R&B Song for “Good To Me”, Worship Song of the Year for “Pour Your Love” and Album of the Year. Obiwon's long time producer and friend, Phat-E was also honored with the NGMA Gospel Producer Of The Year award for his work on "Gold Water".

In 2015, Obiora Obiwon released a triplet of singles "Floodgates (The New Overflow)", "God Of Wonders" and "Bunibe" to herald his 10th music career anniversary and announced his fourth album entitled "Floodgates: The Beginning Of The New Overflow". The album, composed primarily of worship music, received positive reviews and saw him touring the church and Christian events circuit. Since then he has released three more post album singles - "A Billion Halleluyah" (2017), "Surge" featuring Glowreeyah Braimah (2018) and "The Life Of Testimony" (2019).

== Personal life ==
Obiwon married Nkechi Obioma Ezeife on 22 October 2011. The couple has a daughter Nmesioma, Michelle born on 4 September 2012 and also a son Chimdalu, Michael born on 23 September 2014.

== Discography ==
=== Studio albums ===
- Floodgates: The Beginning Of The New Overflow (2016)
- Gold Water (2013)
- The Rebirth (2009)
- Overture (2006)

=== EPs ===
- F.a.t.h.e.r (Part 2) (2011)
- Overture Plus (2007)
- Get 'Em Up (2005)

== See also ==
- List of Igbo people
- List of Nigerian gospel musicians
- List of Nigerian musicians
