= Bank Alert =

Single by P-Square
- Language: Igbo; Pidgin English
- Released: 15 September 2016
- Genre: Afrobeats
- Length: 4:13
- Label: Square Records
- Songwriters: Peter Obumneme Okoye; Paul Nonso Okoye
- Producer: Peter Okoye

P-Square singles chronology
"Kidogo" (2016)	"Bank Alert" (2016)	"Bedroom" (2017)

Music video
- "Bank Alert" on YouTube

"Bank Alert" is a song by Nigerian pop duo P-Square. It was released on 16 September 2016 and was recorded in Igbo and Pidgin English and samples lyrics from "Iyogogo" by Onyeka Onwenu. It was released as a free download on 15 September and the next day, the accompanying music video was released on YouTube. By 22 September 2016, the music video for "Bank Alert" received over one million views. In October 2017, Paul Okoye said on Twitter that "Bank Alert" was his first solo music video, describing the video shoot as his first solo effort after P-Square's split. A gospel version of the song was released in 2017.

== Composition ==
A reviewer from OkayAfrica described it as a "catchy song built on light guitars, bubbly synthesizers and a shuffling beat."

== Music video ==
The music video for "Bank Alert" was directed by Clarence Peters and Jude Okoye with cameo appearances by Phyno, Harrysong, KCee, Onyeka Onwenu and Mr. Ibu among others.

== Critical reception ==
Upon release, "Bank Alert" received mixed reviews, as critics found it catchy and appealing to fans but criticized it for being unoriginal and generic. Joey Akan of Pulse Nigeria saw "Bank Alert" as a neo-highlife song about wealth and romance that showed no artistic growth following their publicized reconciliation. He concluded, "You need to hear this—just because it’s Psquare. Any other thing you expect to hear is not present". Chidi Chima of TheCable deemed the single reminiscent of "Iyogogo", and concluded, "while Psquare has improved on its infusion of sounds, the twin brothers have declined in originality."

Wilfred Okiche of 360nobs said "Bank Alert" follows their usual formula of flaunting wealth with an upbeat sound, adding "it is just like they never left." Arinze Obikili of Jaguda rated the song a 2/5 and wrote that P-Square "arrived at the same point they left" with a "bang average generic song" that was likely to become popular despite its simplicity.

== Accolades ==
Year	Awards ceremony	Award description(s)	Results	Ref
2017	Nigeria Entertainment Awards	Hottest Single of the Year	Nominated	
2017	Nigeria Entertainment Awards	Best Music Video	Nominated	
2017	COSON Song Awards	Best Song in Melody	Nominated	
2017	Ghana-Naija Showbiz Awards	Song of the Year	Nominated	
2017	Ghana-Naija Showbiz Awards	Music Video of the Year	Nominated	

== Release history ==
Release history and formats for "Bank Alert"
Region	Date	Format	Label
Various	15 September 2016	Digital download	Square Records

== See also ==
- List of songs recorded by P-Square
