= Nakaaya Sumari =

Tanzanian singer and rapper (born 1982)

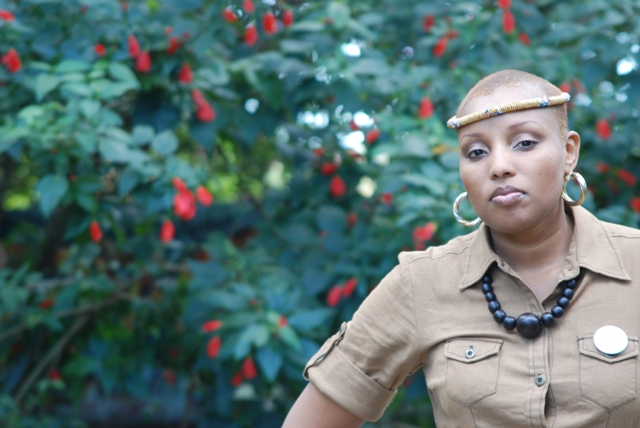
- Nakaaya

Background information
- Born: Nakaaya Abraham Sumari; September 3, 1982 (age 43)
- Origin: Arusha, Tanzania
- Genres: R&B, political hip hop, Dansi, Bongo Flava
- Occupations: Singer, rapper
- Instrument: Vocals
- Website: nakaaya.com

Nakaaya Sumari (born September 3, 1982 in Arusha) is a Tanzanian singer and rapper.

She is the eldest of five children. Her younger sister, Nancy Sumari, was Miss Tanzania 2005 and Miss World Africa.

Nakaaya was a featured star of the African Great Lakes region's first reality TV show called "Tusker Project Fame", that aired from October 1 to December 17, 2006. The show had aspiring singers from Kenya, Uganda and Tanzania all living together and receiving training in the music business. She lasted five weeks on the seven-week program.

After the show, Nakaaya returned to Tanzania to record her first album.

In February 2008, she released her debut album, Nervous Conditions. The album was released independently and sold well although it was only released in cd format. The first single, Malaika did well on radio, but the follow-up single, Mr. Politician was a huge hit across the African Great Lakes region. The video enjoyed wide rotation and made Nakaaya hugely popular.

She has also worked as a goodwill Ambassador for the East African Community.

She signed a record contract with Sony BMG in 2009 after a tour in Denmark.

At the 2008 Kisima Music Awards, she was nominated for Tanzanian song of the year category for her song "Mr. Politician". At the 2008 Pearl of Africa Music Awards, she was nominated for the Best Tanzanian Female Artiste category

== Awards ==
=== Nominated ===
- 2008 Kisima Music Awards - Song of the year ('Mr. Politician)
- 2008 Pearl of Africa Music Awards - Best Tanzanian Female Artiste
- 2012 Tanzania Music Awards - Best Reggae Song' (Ni wewe')
