= E No Easy =

P-Square song featuring J. Martins

Single by P-Square featuring J. Martins

from the album Danger
- Released: 16 May 2010
- Recorded: 2009
- Genre: Afrobeats
- Length: 4:27
- Label: Square
- Songwriters: Peter Okoye; Paul Okoye; Justice Martins
- Producer: J. Martins

P-Square singles chronology
"I Love You" (2010)	"E No Easy" (2010)	"Gimme Dat" (2010)

J. Martins singles chronology
"This Kind Party" (2010)	"E No Easy" (2010)	"Sugarcane" (2010)

Music video
- "E No Easy" on YouTube

"E No Easy" is a 2009 song by P-Square featuring J. Martins, off the former's fourth studio album Danger. The song later served as the basis for the 2012 French and English remake "Positif", recorded by Matt Houston featuring P-Square. After success of the French adaptation, the original "E No Easy" was also released finding some additional success in France in 2012. In 2011, French-Algerian rapper El Matador had also included a mix of "E No Easy" credited to "El Matador feat P-Square" in his mixtape release Escale sur la lune, adding French rap verses, raï influences and additional Spanish lyrics to the track.

== Accolades ==
The music video for "E No Easy" won Most Gifted Duo, Group, or Featuring at the 2010 Channel O Music Video Awards. It also received nominations for Best Cinematography at the 2010 SoundCity Music Video Awards and Best Video at the 2010 MTV Africa Music Awards.

Awards and nominations for "E No Easy"
Organization	Year	Category	Result	Ref.
Channel O Music Video Awards	2010	Most Gifted Duo, Group, or Featuring	Won	
Soundcity Music Video Awards	2010	Best Cinematography	Nominated	
MTV Africa Music Awards	2010	Best Video	Nominated	

== Charts ==
Based on the success of "Positif", the English original "E No Easy" gained attention and popularity in France also entering the French SNEP charts reaching #141 on chart dated 26 May 2012.

Chart (2012)	Peak position
France (SNEP)	141

== "Positif" ==
"Positif"

Remix by Matt Houston featuring P-Square

from the album Racines
- Released: 23 April 2012
- Recorded: April 2012
- Studio: Paris, France
- Genre: Afrobeats
- Length: 3:49
- Label: On the Track
- Songwriters: Matthieu Gore; Peter Okoye; Paul Okoye; Justice Martins
- Producer: J. Martins

Matt Houston chronology
"Booty" (2011)	"Positif" (2012)	"Happy Birthday" (2012)

Music video
- "Positif" on YouTube

"Positif" is a 2012 bilingual song in French and English by Matt Houston featuring Nigerian brother duo P-Square. It is a remake of the earlier hit by P-Square with French lyrics added by Matthieu Gore (real name of Matt Houston) The song is taken from Houston's forthcoming album Racines as a first pre-release on 23 April 2012 from the album due in June 2012.

Houston sings the introductory French part while P-Square brother Peter and Paul are doing the backing vocals. The English parts are done by the Okoye brothers.

As a promotion, Matt Houston also released a "making of" video of his collaboration with Peter and Paul Okoye in the Video Clip Studios where the French hit was cut. It was the third of a series of "Welcome To My World" video episodes. The official music video was uploaded on Matt Houston's VEVO channel on 4 May 2012. The single featured at #47 in its first week of release and climbed up to #6 on the SNEP French Singles Chart.

=== Charts ===
Chart (2012)	Peak position
Belgium Urban (Ultratop Flanders)	35
Belgium (Ultratop 50 Wallonia)	7
Belgium Dance (Ultratop Wallonia)	2
France (SNEP)	5
