= Buffalo Souljah =

Zimbabwean musician

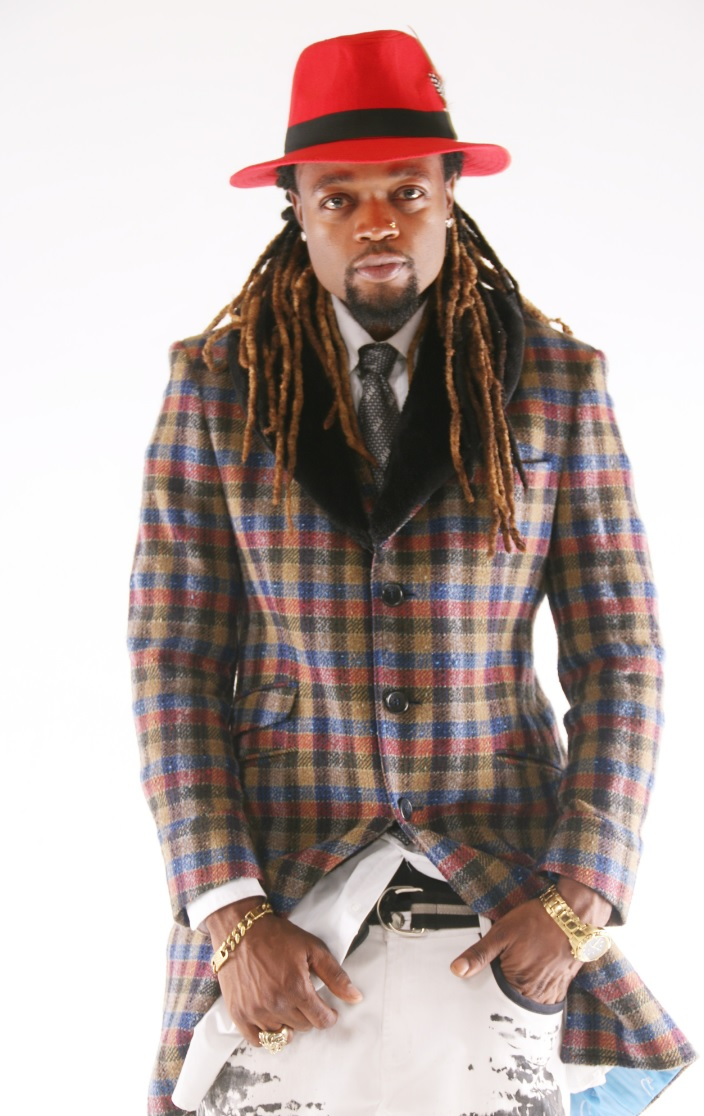

Background information
- Born: Thabani Ndlovu; 16 September 1983 (age 42); Bulawayo, Zimbabwe
- Origin: Mufakose/Harare/Zimbabwe
- Genres: Dancehall; Reggae; Afrofusion
- Occupations: songwriter; record producer; musician
- Instruments: Vocals, sampler, percussion
- Years active: 2000–present
- Labels: United Nations of Africa Music Group

Thabani Ndlovu, known professionally as Buffalo Souljah, is a South Africa-based Zimbabwean reggae recording artist and songwriter. He won ten times at the Channel O Africa Music Video Awards, Soundcity Music Awards, and Zimdancehall Awards and Nominated for Afrimma, Afrima, IRAWMA. He owns the record label U.N.A. (United Nations of Africa Music Group).

== Early life ==
Ndlovu was born in 1980 in Bulawayo as the third-born in a family of four. He then moved to Harare, where he was raised in the high-density suburb of Mufakose. He attended Mufakose High School and then moved to South Africa soon after graduating.

== Career ==
Buffalo Souljah's career began at the age of eight when he composed his first song, "Zuva Randisinga Kanganwe" (The day I will never forget). The song was inspired by a childhood incident in which he and his brother were chased by some baboons after having taunted and provoked them. Buffalo credits his passion for music to his father, who was also a musician. His father was a jazz artist and saxophonist who worked with Thomas Mapfumo in the late 1970s and early 1980s.

Buffalo Souljah also recorded an Afro-jazz album called Indolvu Yangena on VaNyoni Beats Records, working closely with Mzilikazi Wa Afrika.

=== Early collaborations ===
In 1996, Buffalo Souljah and his friends David Zulu and Stewart Chamirai formed the group Intelligent Racuss Cruuks, formerly known as ULD, aka Prettybway. The group released three afro hip-hop albums, a mix of traditional music called jiti and hip-hop which involved a hip-hop drum, kick, and bass sequence fused with the Zimbabwean traditional instrument Mbira.

When he moved to South Africa in 1999, he entered its music industry and worked with several South African artists, featuring on their albums. In 2002, he had his first break working with the Ghanaian artist Kweku, aka Instinct. He was later involved with a group called Street Disciples and published an album, The Chosen Ones under the label Da Apostles.

=== Record deal: United Nations of Africa (U.N.A) ===
Later, Buffalo Souljah signed with HOTWAX records, a record album owned by veteran DJ Waxxy. Buffalo Souljah now owns and heads a record label called U.N.A. (United Nations of Africa), and signed his first artist, Vanessa Sibanda, formerly known as Queen Vee, in 2010. Queen Vee is a former pageant queen, being crowned Miss Zimbabwe in 2008. After relinquishing the crown in 2009, Queen Vee relocated to South Africa and met Big Buff, who eventually signed her to his label United Nations of Africa. Since 2010, Queen Vee has worked with celebrated musicians such as A L-Tido, Ziyon from Liquid Deep and AB Crazy among others.

== Endorsements ==
Buffalo Souljah has signed endorsements with One Campaign, Coke Studios, and One Man Band.

== Performances ==
- Harare International Festival of the Arts Zimbabwe
- Lake of Stars
- Nigeria Calaba Festival
- Tanzania Hip-Hop Mag Festival
- City of Joburg New Year's Eve
- Washington DC African Summit Concert
- Lake of Malawi
- Malaysia African Diaspora Festival

== Notable singles ==
In 2008, Buffalo Souljah released a dancehall single, "Bubble Ya Bums", for his debut album. It became a hit. The music video was on high rotation on Channel O and MTV Base and won him two Channel O Spirit Of Africa Awards in the categories "Best Newcomer" and "Best Dancehall/Ragga" respectively.

== Discography ==
Song	Album	Year
Ziyawa	The Chosen One	2014
Chibhambi Chabhadhara	The Chosen One	2014
Da Chosen One	The Chosen One	2014
Basawine	The Chosen One	2014
Luv Song	The Movement	2009
My Type O Guy	The Movement	2009
Too Many O Me	The Movement	2009
Ghetto Anthem	The Movement	2009
Belong (with Nasty C)	Coke Studios Collab	2016
Bubble Ya	Single release	2008
My Lady	Single release	2016
Kilamanjaro	Single release	2016
Dj Waxxy: Yini	Single release	2017
Samzee Deenamba: From the streets	2016	Featuring Buffalo Souljah and Eindo
Blacklez: Success	Single release	2015
Queen Vee: Thirsty	Single release	2015
Born to be wild	Single release	Featuring Nyla (Brick N Lace)

== Awards and recognition ==
In 2013, Buffalo Souljah was appointed the Zimbabwean Youth Cultural Ambassador by Minister S. Kasukuwere.

Song/Project	Award	Year	Platform
Bubble Your Bumz	Best Newcomer	2008	Channel O Africa Music Video Awards
Bubble Your Bumz	Best Ragga Dancehall Video	2008	Channel O Africa Music Video Awards
Buffalo Souljah/Taygrin/Gal level for My Type Of Girl (Zimbabwe/Malawi/Namibia)	Best Duo or Group	2009	Channel O Africa Music Video Awards
Judgement	Best Ragga Dancehall Video	2009	Channel O Africa Music Video Awards
Ezandlha Phezulu	Viewers Choice (Voting)	2010	Soundcity Music Awards
Styra Inonyengesa featuring Cabo Snoop	Best Ragga Dancehall	2011	Channel O Africa Music Video Awards
Turn Up	Most Gifted Ragga Dancehall	2014	Channel O Africa Music Video Awards
N/A	Best Artist Diaspora	2015	Zimdancehall Awards
N/A	International Achiever	2016	Zimbabwe Music Awards (ZIMA)
N/A	Best Reggae		Nigeria AFRIMA
N/A	Africa Best Dance hall		Texas U.S
N/A	Best International Artist	2020	Zimdancehall Awards
N/A	Rest of Africa (nomination)	2021	South African Music Awards

Buffalo Souljah is the only Zimbabwean artist to win multiple Channel O Music Video Awards (six in total).
