= 2010 Nigeria Entertainment Awards =

The 2010 Nigeria Entertainment Awards was the 5th edition of the ceremony and was held on 18 September 2010. The event took place at BMCC Tribeca Performing Art Center, New York City. Omawumi and Dagrin led the nomination list with 5 and 4 awards respectively.

== Awards ==
Best Album of the Year

- Mushin 2 Mohits - Wande Coal
- CEO- Da Grin
- Wonder Woman - Omawumi
- Unstoppable - Tuface

Hottest Single of the Year

- "Kondo" - Da Grin
- "Kokoroko" - Kefee ft. Timaya
- "Omoba" - D Prince
- "Free Madness" - Terry G
- "Bad" - Wande Coal

Best New Act of the Year

- Jaywon
- D'Prince
- Jesse Jagz
- Lami
- Omawumi

Gospel Artist of the Year

- Kenny Saint Brown
- Kefee
- Bouqui
- Lara George
- Kore

Indigenous Artist of the Year

- Asa
- Nneka
- 9ice
- Pasuma
- Jesse King

Best Pop/R&B Artist of the Year

- Banky W
- Wande Coal
- Chuddy K
- Omawumi
- P-Square

Best Rap Act of the Year

- Jesse Jagz
- Modenine
- M.I.
- Da’Grin
- Naeto C

Best Soul/Neo Soul Act of the Year

- Tuface
- Lami
- Eva Alordiah
- Nneka
- Toba Gold

Best Collaboration with Vocals

- "Born Champion" - Pype ft. Dagrin, Vector, Naeto C, Sasha & GT
- "Kokoroko" - Kefee ft Timaya
- "E No Easy" - P-Square ft J Martins
- "Nobody" - Tuface ft M.I.
- "Thank God" - DaGrin ft Omawumi

Best International Artist

- Wale
- Keno
- JJC
- Kas
- Moeazy

Music Producer of the Year

- Don Jazzy
- So Sick
- J. Sleek
- Dokta Frabz
- Cobhams

Best International Producer of the Year

- Kid Konnect
- Dogmites
- JJC
- Mictunes

Best Male Music Video of the Year (Artist & Director)

- "One day" - eLDee (eLDee)
- "Fall in Love" - Dbanj (Sesan)
- "Implication" - Tuface (unknown)
- "Lagos Party" - Banky W (Kemi Adetiba)
- "E no easy" - P Square ft. J. Martins (Jude Okoye)

Best Female Music Video of the Year (Artist & Director)

- "You know it" - Goldie (Clarence Peters)
- "Today na Today"- Omawumi (Kemi Adetiba)
- "If u want Me" - Mocheddah (Clarence Peters)
- "Know- Lami (Brandon)
- "Kokoroko" - Kefee ft. Timaya (Wudland)

Best Actor in a Film/Short Story

- Ramsey Noauh - Guilty Pleasures (2009 film)
- Jim Iyke - The Shepherd / Dream Maker
- Femi Adebayo - Ifederu
- Desmond Elliot - Before the Light
- Kayode Akinbayo - Bi a ti ko

Best Actress in a Film/Short Story

- Nse Ikpe Etim – Reloaded (2009 film)
- Ini Edo - Native Son
- Genevieve Nnaji- Silent Scandals
- Stephanie Okereke -Nnenda
- Omotola Jalade - Deepest of Dreams

Best Film (Director)

- The Figurine - Kunle Afolayan
- Guilty Pleasures (2009 film) - Daniel Adenimokan and Desmond Elliot
- Nnenda - Izu Ojukwu
- Silent Scandals - T.K. Falope
- Behind a Smile - Frank Rajah Arase

Best Actress in TV Series/Reality/Game Show

- Genevieve Nnaji - Guinness Ultimate Survivor (Celebrity edition)
- Bimbo Akintola - Circle of 3
- Kate Henshaw-Nuttal - Circle of 3
- Damilola Adegbite - Tinsel
- Funlola Aofiyebi-Raimi - Tinsel

Best Actor in TV Series/Reality/Game Show

- Frank Edohor - Who wants to be a Millionaire
- Kayode Peters - Flat Mates
- Gideon Okeke - Tinsel

Best On-Screen Personality (People's Choice Awards)

- Denrele
- Ill
- Andre blaze
- Dorisha brick George
- Adaure Achumba

Best TV Series/Reality Show/ Game Show

- Half Sisters
- Circle 3
- Tinsel
- Star Quest
- Gulder Ultimate Search

International Event of the Year (Promoter)

- Thisday Music Festival
- UK Naija Carnival
- Arise Fashion Week New York
- Ovation Red Carol
- Miss Nigeria in America

Best World DJ

- DJ DeeMoney
- DJ MightyMike
- DJ Vinny
- DJ Stramborrella
- DJ Ike
- DJ Xclusive

Best Radio Personality

- Rhythm 93.7 FM - Ik (Wild Child)
- The Beat 99.9 FM - Toolz
- Top Radio - Tosyn Buknor
- The Beat 99.9 FM - Olisa Adibua
- Inspiration fm - Dan Foster

Best Comedian

- Seyi Law
- Wale Gate
- Jedi
- AY
- I Go Die

Fashion Designer of the Year

- Deola Sagoe
- Alvins
- Momo couture
- Adebayo jones
- Ouch!

Entertainment Personality of the Year

- Nduka Obiagbena
- Cecil Hammond
- Keke and D1
- Dele Momodu
- Obi Asika

Most Promising Act to Watch

- Chuddy K
- D'Prince
- Eva Alordiah
- Femi Adeyinka
- Mo'Cheddah
