= Channel O Music Video Awards =

Music video awards

Channel O Africa Music Video Awards, once known as Spirit of Africa Music Video Awards, are Pan-African music awards organised by South Africa -based Channel O television channel. The awards were first held in 2003 under the name Reel Music Video Awards. Since 2005 the awards have been held annually. The winners are voted by Channel O's viewers across the continent.

== 2003 ==
Title: Reel Music Video Awards

Venue: M-Net Randburg Studios in Johannesburg, South Africa.

Hosts: -

Categories: 23 in total

Special Recognition: - Fela Kuti (Nigeria)

== 2004 ==
No awards ceremony was held in this year.

== 2005 ==
Title: African Music Video Awards

Venue: Johannesburg Civic Center, South Africa

Hosts:

Special Recognition: - Hugh Masekela (South Africa)

== 2006 ==
Title: Spirit of Africa Music Video Awards

Venue: Gallagher Estate in Johannesburg, South Africa

Hosts: David Kau (South Africa) and Channel O VJs

Special Recognition: Zola (South Africa)

=== Winners ===
- Best Male Video: Lagbaja - “Never Far Away“ (Nigeria)
- Best Female Video: Lizha James - “For All Ya“ (Mozambique)
- Best Newcomer: D'banj - "Tongolo" (Nigeria)
- Best Duo or Group: Malaika - "2 Bob" (South Africa)
- Best Urban Jazz Video: Zama Jobe - "Ndawo Yami" (South Africa)
- Best Dance Video: Dj Cleo - "Goodbye" (South Africa)
- Best African Pop: 2Face - "Ole" (Nigeria)
- Best African Southern: Mista Doe - "Hot To Death" (Botswana)
- Best African West: 2Face - "Ole" (Nigeria)
- Best African East: Jonny Ragga - "Give Me The Key" (Ethiopia)
- Best African DJ: DJ Fresh (South Africa)
- Best Hip Hop Video: Mode 9 (Feat. Nnena) - "Cry" (Nigeria)
- Best Reggae Video: Lucky Dube - "Respect" (South Africa)
- Best R&B Video: Dare - "Escalade" (Nigeria)
- Best Kwaito Video: Brickz - "Tjovitjo" (South Africa)
- Best Collaboration Video: Danny K & Mandoza - "Music" (South Africa)
- Best Director: Mode 9 (Feat. Nnena) - "Cry" (Nigeria)
- Best Special Effects: Weird MC - "Ijoya" (Nigeria)
- Video Of The Year: Mode 9 (Feat. Nnena) - "Cry" (Nigeria)

== 2007 ==
Title: Spirit of Africa Music Video Awards

Venue: Johannesburg City Hall, South Africa

Hosts: D'Banj (Nigeria) and DJ S'Bu (South Africa)

Special Recognition: Oliver Mtukudzi (Zimbabwe)

=== Winners ===
- Best Male Video: Nameless – “Sinzia” (Kenya)
- Best Female Video: Dama Do Bling - “Danca Do Remexe” (Mozambique)
- Best Newcomer: “The Dogg - Baby Don't Go” (Namibia)
- Best Duo Or Group: “P-Square” - Bizzy Body (Nigeria)
- Best Dance Video: Acid - “Banyane E Basimane” (Botswana)
- Best Ragga Dancehall Video: Peter Miles – “Love“ (Uganda)
- Best R&B Video: Lizha James - “Numa wa mina” (Mozambique)
- Best Kwaito: Gazza – “Mokasie” (Namibia)
- Best African Southern: Dama Do Bling - “Danca Do Remexe” (Mozambique)
- Best African West: De Indispensables - “I Love U” (Nigeria)
- Best African East: Juma Nature – Mugambo (Tanzania)
- Best Hip-Hop Video: Scar - “Metlholo” (Botswana)
- Best Special Effects: D'Banj - “Why Me” (Nigeria)
- Best Director: East African Bashment Crew - “Kube” (Kenya & Uganda)
- Video Of The Year: East African Bashment Crew - “Kube” (Kenya & Uganda)

== 2008 ==
Title: Spirit of Africa Music Video Awards

Venue: Carnival City in Johannesburg, South Africa

Hosts: Kabelo 'KB' Ngakane and Nonhle Thema (all from South Africa)

Special Recognition: George Lee (saxophonist) (Ghana)

=== Winners ===
- Best Male Video: Ikechukwu – “Wind Em Well” (Nigeria)
- Best Female Video: Lizha James – “Nita Mukuna Nwini” (Mozambique)
- Best Newcomer: Buffalo Souljah – “Bubble You Bumz” (Zimbabwe)
- Best Duo Or Group: P-Square – “Do Me” (Nigeria)
- Best Dance Video: Lady May – “Chokola” (Namibia)
- Best Ragga Dancehall Video: Buffalo Souljah – “Bubble Your Bumz”
- Best R&B Video: Gal Level – “Falling In Love” (Namibia)
- Best Kwaito: The Dogg – “Can U Feel It” (Namibia)
- Best African Southern: Freshlyground – “Pot Belly” (South Africa)
- Best African West: M-Trill – “Bounce” (Nigeria)
- Best African East: Witness – “Zero” (Tanzania)
- Best Hip-Hop Video: KC Presh – “Sengemenge” (Nigeria)
- Video Of The Year: P-Square – “Do Me” (Nigeria)

== 2009 ==
Title: Music Video Awards (CHOMVAs)

Venue: Carnival City in Gauteng, South Africa

Hosts: Kabelo 'KB' Ngakane, Nonhle Thema and Lungile 'Lungsta' Radu (all from South Africa)

Special Recognition: Brenda Fassie (South Africa)

=== Winners ===
- Best Male Video: Darey - “Not the Girl” (Nigeria)
- Best Female Video: Sasha - “Only One” (Nigeria)
- Best Newcomer: Khuli - “Tswak Stik'em” (South Africa)
- Best Duo Or Group: Buffalo Souljah & Tay Grin & Gal Level - “My Type Of Girl” (Zimbabwe, Malawi, Namibia)
- Best Dance Video: Lady May - “Ndota” (Namibia)
- Best Ragga Dancehall Video: Buffalo Souljah - “Judgment” (Zimbabwe)
- Best R&B Video: Darey - “Not the Girl” (Nigeria)
- Best Afro Pop: Gal Level - “Touch Me” (Namibia)
- Best Kwaito: Gazza feat. Bleksem - “Passop” (Namibia, South Africa)
- Best African Southern: Lizha James - “Estilo Xakhale” (Mozambique)
- Best African West: Ikechukwu - “Shoobeedoo” (Nigeria)
- Best African East: XOD - “I Want You Back” (Uganda)
- Best Hip-Hop Video: Zeus - “Gijima” (Botswana)
- Video Of The Year: Naeto C - “Ki Ni Big Deal” (Nigeria)

== 2010 ==
- Venue: Sandton Convention Centre in Sandton, South Africa
- Hosts: Lungile 'Lungsta' Radu and Thomas Gumede (all from South Africa)
- Special Recognition: K'Naan (Somalia)

=== Winners ===
- Best Male Video: Black Coffee (feat Zakes Bantwini) - "Juju" (South Africa)
- Best Female Video: Mo'Cheddah (feat Othello) - "If You Want Me" (Nigeria)
- Best Newcomer: L-Tido (feat T-P) - "Calling" (South Africa)
- Best Duo Or Group: P-Square (feat J. Martins) - "E No Easy" (Nigeria)
- Best Dance Video: Liquideep - "Fairytale" (South Africa)
- Best Ragga Dancehall Video: General Pype (Feat Naeto C, Vector, Sasha, Da Grin and GT) - "Champion (Remix)" (Nigeria)
- Best R&B Video: Urban Reign - "Addicted" (South Africa)
- Best Afro Pop: D'banj - "Fall in Love" (Nigeria)
- Best Kwaito: Big Nuz and DJ Tira - "Umlilo" (South Africa)
- Best African Southern: Pro - "Sekele" (South Africa)
- Best African West: 2face Idibia - "Implications" (Nigeria)
- Best African East: Obita and Loyiso - "Everybody Dance" (South Africa)
- Best Hip-Hop Video: Naeto C - "Ako Mi Ti Poju" (Nigeria)
- Video Of The Year: Teargas - "Party 101" (South Africa)

== 2011 ==
- Venue: Sandton Convention Centre in Sandton, South Africa
- Hosts: Banky W (Nigeria) and Dineo Moeketsi (South Africa)
- Special Recognition: D'banj (Nigeria)

=== Winners ===
- Most Gifted Dance Video: Darey - "Ba Ni Ki Di" (Nigeria)
- Most Gifted Kwaito Video: The Dogg - "This Is My Time" (Namibia)
- Most Gifted African West Video: Naeto C - "Ten Over Ten" (Nigeria)
- Most Gifted Newcomer Video: Ice Prince/Brymo - "Oleku" (Nigeria)
- Most Gifted Video of The Year: Zakes Bantwini - "Wasting My Time" (South Africa)
- Most Gifted Hip Hop Video: AKA - "Victory Lap" (South Africa)
- Most Gifted Male Video: D'banj featuring Snoop Dogg - "Mr Endowed (Remix)" (Nigeria)
- Most Gifted Female Video: Lira - "Phakade" (South Africa)
- Most Gifted Duo, Group or Featuring Video: Hip Hop Pantsula, Teargas and Liquideep - "Born For This" (South Africa)
- Most Gifted Afro Pop Video: Theo - "Ukhona" (South Africa)
- Most Gifted African Southern Video: Liquideep - "Settle For Less" (South Africa)
- Most Gifted R&B Video: Banky W. featuring M.I - "Feeling It" (Nigeria)
- Most Gifted African East Video: Keko, Radio and Weasel - "How We Do It (remix)" (Uganda)
- Most Gifted Ragga Dancehall Video: Samini - "Dadiekye" (Ghana)

== 2012 ==
- Venue: Walter Sisulu Square in Soweto, South Africa
- Hosts: Bonang Matheba (South Africa) and Ice Prince (Nigeria)
- Special Recognition: Oskido (South Africa)

== 2013 ==
- Venue: Walter Sisulu Square in Soweto, South Africa
- Hosts: AKA (South Africa) and Naeto C (Nigeria)
- Special Recognition: P-Square (Nigeria)

=== Winners ===
- Most Gifted Kwaito Video: Professor featuring Oskido and Character (singer) - "Fingerprints" (RSA)
- Most Gifted Ragga/Dancehall Video: P-Unit featuring Collo - "You Guy" (Kenya)
- Most Gifted RnB Video: Banky W. - "Yes/No" (Nigeria)
- Most Gifted Hip-Hop Video: AKA - "Jealousy" (RSA)
- Most Gifted Dance Video: Mafikizolo - "Khona" (RSA)
- Most Gifted Afro-Pop Video: The Soil featuring Zakwe - "Inkomo" (RSA)
- Most Gifted African East Video: P-Unit featuring Collo - "You Guy" (Kenya)
- Most Gifted African West Video: P-Square - "Alingo" (Nigeria)
- Most Gifted African South Video: Oskido - "Tsa-Mandebele" (RSA)
- Most Gifted Newcomer Video: Khaya Mthethwa - "Move" (RSA)
- Most Gifted Duo/Group or Featuring Video: Zone Fam - "Contolola" (Zambia)
- Most Gifted Female Video: Zonke - "Feelings" (RSA)
- Most Gifted Male Video: Zeus featuring AKA and Tumi - "#DatsWasup" (Botswana and RSA)
- Most Gifted Video Of The Year: Wizkid - "Azonto" (Nigeria)

== See also ==
- MTV Africa Music Awards
