= Last Nite (P-Square album) =

Studio album by P-Square
- Released: 2003
- Recorded: 2003
- Genre: R&B; Afropop
- Length: 41:17
- Label: Timbuk2 Music
- Producer: P-Square & Jude Engees Okoye

P-Square chronology
Last Nite (2003)	Get Squared (2005)

Last Nite is the debut studio album by Nigerian recording artists P-Square, released in 2003 by Timbuk2 Music Label. The album produced two major singles – "Senorita" and "Igbedu". The duo and their elder brother, Jude Engees Okoye, produced the album. The album was sponsored by Benson & Hedges. On 10 October 2008, the album's reloaded version was released on iTunes and features a different album cover.

== Singles ==
- "Senorita", the debut single from P-Square, features a music video directed by Jude Engees Okoye. The song received the most airplay from the album and showcased the duo's dancing skills. Michael Jackson inspired the duo to dance while growing up.
- "Igbedu" is the second single from the duo's debut album. The music video was shot in Jos, Nigeria, and directed by their elder brother, Jude Engees Okoye.

== Track listing ==
All tracks are written by P-Square

No.	Title	Length
1.	"E No Good"	4:33
2.	"Last Nite"	4:18
3.	"Kolo"	6:12
4.	"Senorita"	4:31
5.	"Igbedu"	4:17
6.	"Dat Tin"	5:13
7.	"Mako Fiesta"	3:57
8.	"Bad Boy"	4:12
9.	"Last Nite (Remix)"	4:07
Total length:		41:17

== Re-release history ==
Region	Date	Format	Label
Worldwide	10 October 2008	CD, digital download	Square Records
