= Urban Reign =

2005 video game

- North American box art
- Developer: Namco
- Publishers: JP: Namco; NA: Namco Hometek; EU: Sony Computer Entertainment
- Director: Masahide Kito
- Producer: Hirofumi Motoyama
- Composers: Yoshihito Yano; Rio Hamamoto; Junichi Nakatsuru; Akitaka Tohyama; Katsuro Tajima
- Platform: PlayStation 2
- Release: NA: September 13, 2005; JP: September 29, 2005; EU: February 3, 2006; AU: 2006
- Genre: Beat 'em up
- Modes: Single-player, multiplayer

Urban Reign (Note: Japanese: アーバンレイン, Hepburn: Āban Rein) is a 2005 beat 'em up game developed and published by Namco for the PlayStation 2. It features 60 player characters to accommodate its four-player multiplayer mode, two of which are Marshall Law and Paul Phoenix from Namco's Tekken series.

== Plot ==
Urban Reign follows the exploits of "brawler-for-hire" Brad Hawk, who is hired to find a kidnapped gang member by the swordswoman Shun Ying Lee. Brad fights his way through the street gangs of Green Harbor, a fortified city in the U.S. As he does so to get some answers, the true machinations of the protagonists reveal themselves and things become more complicated.

== Gameplay ==
Urban Reign features both single player and multiplayer action with both multiple AI opponents and human controlled characters on the same screen fighting at the same time. The environment, pick up weapons, throw objects, give instructions to AI partners, and pull off moves on multiple opponents. There are low and high grapples, air grapples, counters and recounters each with its own animations for each character. Although characters have optimal combo strings, most combos start with three presses of the attack button, the third of which will juggle an opponent. grapple, special move, simply continuing the combo or running away to pick up a weapon or reposition.

Neutralizing attacks by opponents is done with a single button press that must be timed to the moment of the attack. Also, if the player presses up or down on the keypad while pressing dodge at the correct time, his character will reverse an attack, if possible. Even when cornered by multiple enemies, it is possible to dodge all oncoming normal attacks.

Finally, "special arts" can be pulled off with a press of two buttons. Special arts cannot be countered, reversed or dodged except by another special move, and they can be buffered. Characters have a "special arts meter" that must be at a certain level for a move to be attempted. The meter is expended.

== Reception ==
Reception

Aggregate score
Aggregator	Score
Metacritic	60/100

Review scores
Publication	Score
Edge	7/10
Electronic Gaming Monthly	5.33/10
Eurogamer	3/10
Famitsu	33/40
Game Informer	8/10
GamePro	3/5
GameRevolution	D+
GameSpot	6.6/10
GameSpy	3.5/5
GameTrailers	7.5/10
GameZone	6.1/10
IGN	6.6/10
Official U.S. PlayStation Magazine	3.5/5
The Sydney Morning Herald	2/5

The game received "mixed" reviews according to video game review aggregator Metacritic. In Japan, however, Famitsu gave it a score of one nine and three eights for a total of 33 out of 40.

GamePro criticised the graphics and control system, but praised the number of arcade-style multiplayer modes. GameSpot said, "The cheap difficulty and blandness of the story mode make Urban Reign difficult to recommend." IGN said, "Urban Reign really could have made use of better tuning to its AI." Eurogamer said, "There's nothing in terms of pay-off to compare to the likes of Ninja Gaiden or God of War in the roaming beat-'em-up genre, which, thugs or not, this is up against, and there's nothing in terms of depth or balance to compare to Virtua Fighter 4 or SoulCalibur for one-on-ones." GameRevolution said, "Had it been given a little more depth pretty much everywhere, this may have been a sleeper hit. Instead, it's just a sleeper."
