= Muthoni =

Muthoni is a Kenyan given name and surname. Notable people with the surname include:

== Given name ==
- Muthoni Gathecha (born 1962), Kenyan actress
- Muthoni Kirima (1931–2023), Kenyan guerilla fighter
- Muthoni Likimani (born 1926), Kenyan writer
- Muthoni Drummer Queen (born Muthoni Ndonga), Kenyan rapper, drummer and entrepreneur

== Surname ==
- Alice Wahome (born Alice Muthoni; 1959), Kenyan politician
- Muthoni wa Gichuru (born Alice Muthoni Gichuru), Kenyan writer
- Dorcas Muthoni (born 1979), Kenyan computer scientist and businesswoman
- Esther Passaris (born Esther Muthoni Passaris; 1964), Kenyan politician
- Lynne Muthoni Wanyeki (born 1972), Kenyan political scientist, activist and journalist
- Mary Muthoni Nyanjiru (died 1922), Kenyan activist
- Teresia Muthoni Gateri (born 2002), Kenyan middle-distance runner
