= Get Squared =

Studio album by P-Square
- Released: May 2005
- Recorded: 2004–2005
- Studio: Clark Studios (Ikeja); Eko Reelmix (Lagos)
- Genre: Afropop; R&B; hip-hop
- Length: 59:24
- Label: Square Records
- Producer: P-Square

P-Square chronology
Last Nite (2003)	Get Squared (2005)	Game Over (2007)

Get Squared is the second studio album by Nigerian musical duo P-Square. It was released in May 2005, by the duo's own label "Square Records". A breakthrough success, the album spawned several hit singles including "Bizzy Body", "Temptation", "Say Your Love", and "Omoge Mi". On 15 May 2009, the album was released on iTunes.

== Critical reception ==
In a retrospective review for Guardian Life, Chiagoziem Onyekwena wrote that Get Squared was the album that "really turned the dancing duo into legitimate pop stars." He added that its reputation as a "classic" was "largely based on impact more than anything else" and that it "hasn't aged as well" as comparable albums. Pulse Nigeria's Adeayo Adebiyi called Get Squared was a "hit-filled multi-genre album" that "rocketed [P-Square] to stardom." He praised its "bold interpretation of hip hop and R&B" and visual style that "perfectly communicated the superstardom they craved," and concluded that it was "a classic that shaped a generation" and "redefined what it means to be a Nigerian pop star."

=== Accolades ===
Year	Awards ceremony	Award description(s)	Results	Ref.
2006	Hip Hop World Awards	Best R&B/Pop Album	Won	
2006	Hip Hop World Awards	Album of the Year	Won	
2006	Nigerian Music Awards	Album of the Year	Won	

== Track listing ==
All tracks produced by P-Square.

Get Squared track listing
No.	Title	Writer(s)	Length
1.	"Story"	P-Square	4:32
2.	"Bizzy Body"	P-Square	4:45
3.	"Oga Police"	P-Square	3:45
4.	"Get Squared"	P-Square	4:26
5.	"Say Your Love"	P-Square	5:09
6.	"Your Name"	P-Square	4:20
7.	"Temptation"	2Me	4:42
8.	"Omoge Mi"	P-Square	4:31
9.	"E Don Happen"	P-Square	4:27
10.	"Your Name (Remix)"	P-Square	4:49
11.	"Bizzy Body (Instrumental)"	P-Square	5:09
12.	"Get Squared (Instrumental)"	P-Square	4:27
13.	"E Don Happen (Instrumental)"	P-Square	4:22
Total length:			59:24

== Personnel ==
- Peter Okoye – recording artist
- Paul Okoye – recording artist
- Jude Engees Okoye – director

== Re-release history ==
Region	Date	Format	Label
iTunes	15 May 2009	CD, digital download	Square Records
