= Matt Houston (singer) =

French singer and producer

- Also known as: Matt
- Born: Matthieu Gore; September 30, 1977 (age 48)
- Origin: Sainte-Anne, Guadeloupe, France
- Genres: R&B
- Instrument: Vocals
- Years active: 1996–present
- Label: On The Track
- Website: matthouston.fr

Matthieu Gore, better known as Matt Houston or Matt, is a French singer and music producer originating from Guadeloupe. He was born in Sainte-Anne, Guadeloupe, on 30 September 1977. He has released five albums and a number of singles.

== Career ==
He started very young in music in Guadeloupe where he won in a singing competition. He later on relocated to Paris living in the 12ème arrondissement. At 16, he took music lessons and played piano and guitar and formed a band with a friend before launching his solo career. In 1996, he established his own record label called on the Track. His debut album was released in June 1999 called Matt, with moderate success followed in 2001 by R&B 2 Rue that won the R&B best album category at 2002 Victoires de la Musique awards and reached platinum status. The leading single "R&B 2 Rue" from the album was his most successful single. Matt Houston also released Chant de bataille in 2003, that had collaborations with a number of rap artists including Sat, Don Choa (of Fonky Family), Dadoo, Skalde Blase. The album was certified gold. In 2006, he released Phoenix 2006, with collaborations with Big Ali, Joe Houston and VR, rappers DJ Scandalous, Eloquence and Busta Flex, and the young Nathy. Matt produced most of the album, in addition to the producer houses Deck, Da Konsepta and producers Komplex and Stéphane Filey. He came back in 2010 with the album Papa est back, with collaborations with Lord Kossity, Kery James, Amel Bent and a mix of R&B with hip hop, zouk, Latin and electro vibes.

After writing "I Wanna Chat" as a soundtrack for Secret Story, Matt launched the girl power band, Hot.Chick.

Matt Houston was involved in a lawsuit against French singer Matthieu Tota, who had picked Matt Pokora as a stage name, and won the lawsuit forcing Matt Pokora to change his name to M. Pokora, after having released his first self-titled album Matt Pokora and his single "Showbiz (The Battle)" under the name Matt Pokora.

In 2012, he bought a night club in Dammarie les Lys (77), near to Paris and released a new album Racines. His single "Positif" with the Nigerian group P-Square was a summer hit in France. He collaborated on the single "Happy Birthday" with Mokobé.

== Discography ==
=== Albums ===
Year	Album	Peak Position			Notes	Certification
Year	Album	BEL (Wa)	FR	SWI		Certification
1999	Matt	—	—	—	Credited to: Matt	
2001	R&B 2 Rue	8	7	73	Credited to: Matt	FR: Platinum
2003	Chant de bataille	19	4	63	Credited to: Matt	FR: Gold
2006	Phoenix 2006	73	13	—	Credited to: Matt	
2010	Papa est back	—	—	—	Credited to: Matt	
2012	Racines	55	14	—	Credited to: Matt Houston	

=== EPs ===
- 2008: Matt Houston: Anthologie 1998 – 2007 (Mixtape in download only)

=== Singles ===
Year	Single	Peak Position			Notes	Album
Year	Single	BEL (Wa)	FR	SWI	Notes	Album
1999	"Je tuerai le mâle"	—	—	—	Credited to: Matt	
2000	"12/0013" (feat. Def Bond)	25	9	—	Credited to: Matt	
2001	"RnB 2 rue"	—	4	—	Credited to: Matt	
2001	"Cendrillon du ghetto" (feat. Lord Kossity)	29	20	—	Credited to: Matt	
2001	"Dans la peau d'un dealer"	37	28	—	Credited to: Matt	
2003	"Miss"	—	27	51	Credited to: Matt	
2012	"Positif" (feat. P-Square)	7	5	—	Credited to: Matt Houston	Racines
2012	"Happy Birthday" (feat. Mokobé)	—	160	—	Credited to: Matt Houston	Racines
2014	"Twist 2k14" (feat. DJ Assad & Dylan Rinnez)	—	81	—	Credited to: Matt Houston	

Collaborations

Year	Single	Peak Position		Album
Year	Single	BEL (Wa)	FR	Album
2012	"Tu y yo" (Lylloo & Matt Houston)	52	29	

Featured in

Year	Single	Peak Position	Album
Year	Single	FR	Album
2004	"Relève la tête" (Kery James pres. Lino, AP, Diam's, Passi, Matt & Kool Shen)	39	

Other non-charting singles

- 2000: "Cybersex"
- 2000: "Je croyais en toi" (feat. Frédo and Kfear of La Brigade)
- 2002: "Hotel motel" (feat. Sat of "Fonky Family")
- 2003: "Wicked"
- 2005: "Chabine"
- 2006: "Phoenix"
- 2008: "Papa est back" (feat. Black Kent)
- 2010: "PlastiQ"
- 2010: "Booty shake"
- 2010: "Ou tu veux quand tu veux"
- 2010/2011: "Cunnilingus"
- 2010/2011: "Point G"

Promotional and unofficial singles

- 2005: "Shorty"
- 2006: "Le test"
- 2006: "Dance with me" (with group Pass Pass) (appears on Big Ballers vol. 1 compilation)
- 2007: "Fuck This Industry"
- 2011: "Shawty A Gangsta" (with DJ Scandalous & Bad Boy artist Red Cafe)
- 2011: "Sex Toy" (with DJ Scandalous & Atlantic artist Trina)
- 2012: "The King Is Back [LeBron James]" (with DJ Scandalous)
- 2012: "La GoGo (Roof On Fire)" (featuring DJ Scandalous, Jadakiss & Styles P of The Lox)
