= MTV Africa Music Awards 2008 =

- Date: November 22, 2008
- Location: Velodrome, Abuja
- Country: Nigeria
- Hosted by: Trevor Nelson

The first annual MTV Africa Music Awards took place on November 22, 2008 in Abuja, Nigeria at The Velodrome. The show was hosted by Trevor Nelson. The nominees were announced on October 7, 2008.

== Nominations and winners ==
=== Artist of the Year ===
- Aṣa
- D'banj - Winner
- P-Square
- HHP
- Seether

=== Best Video ===
- Movaizhaleine — "Nous"
- Ikechukwu — "Wind Am Well" - Winner
- P-Square — "Roll It"
- Freshlyground — "Pot Belly"
- Pro Kid — "Uthini Ngo Pro"

=== Best Female ===
- Wahu - Winner
- Aṣa
- Dama Do Bling
- Sasha P
- Zonke

=== Best Male ===
- Jua Cali
- 2Face
- D'banj - Winner
- DJ Cleo
- HHP

=== Best Group ===
- P-Square - Winner
- Freshly Ground
- Jozi
- The Parlotones
- East African Bashment Crew

=== Best New Act ===
- Kwaw Kese
- Wahu
- 9ice
- Naeto C - Winner
- Da L.E.S.

=== Best Alternative ===
- Buraka Som Sistema
- Goldfish
- Seether - Winner
- The Parlotones
- Coldplay

=== Best Hip-Hop ===
- 9ice - Winner
- HHP
- Professor Jay
- Lil Wayne
- The Game

=== Best R&B ===
- P-Square
- Akon
- Loyiso
- Alicia Keys - Winner
- Rihanna

=== Best Live Performer ===
- Samini
- D'banj
- P-Square
- Cassette
- Jozi - Winner

=== Listener's choice award ===
- Jax Panik — "Cigarettes and Cinnamon"
- D'banj — "Why Me"
- Naakaya — "Mr. Politician"
- JB Mpiana — "Zadio Kongolo"
- P Unit (featuring DNA) — "Una"
- Toniks — "Beera Nange"
- Ofori Amponsah (featuring Samini) — "Odwo"

=== MAMA legend award ===
- Fela Kuti

=== My Video ===
- Jide Rotilu??, Adetoro Rotilu ??, Razor Blee G
