= XOD =

Racing yacht class

XOD (Keelboat)
Development
- Designer: Alfred Westmacott
- Location: St Helens, Isle of Wight
- Year: 1909
- Design: One-Design
- Name: XOD (Keelboat)

Boat
- Crew: 2 - 3
- Displacement: minimum 1304kg

Hull
- Type: Monohull

The XOD Class Keelboat (X (Class) One Design (XOD) keelboat) is a small 21 ft day racing yacht with fleets based on the south coast of England.

The XOD Class maintain six active fleets around the Solent area, between Chichester Harbour in the East and Poole Harbour in the West. In each of the locations, the local Club manages the racing. Seasons and race programmes vary to meet the requirements of the local membership.

The X One Design was designed by Alfred Westmacott, who was managing director of Woodnutts Boatyard at St Helens on the Isle of Wight. He specialised in building small day racing boats and these included the Seaview Mermaid, Solent Sunbeam and Victory. Racing first took place in Southampton Water in 1911 under the auspices of the MYC (later to become the Royal Motor Yacht Club). By the outbreak of the First World War some ten boats had been built. After the First World War, building resumed in 1923, continued till 1939, stopped during WW2 and resumed in 1946. The latest boat built was as recently as 2007. The hull shape has remained unchanged since the original design but there have been changes to the approved types of timber, fastenings and surface treatments. This last change was perhaps the most important, as many boats have now been epoxied with considerable savings in upkeep and prolonging the life of the boats so treated.

X One Design racing takes place throughout the season in six locations around the Solent. At each one a full programme of racing is organised by the Clubs involved. Of the 202 X boats ever built, after allowing for those lost to fire, storm, neglect and one even to enemy action, there are still 190 registered. XOD fleets are in Cowes, Hamble, Itchenor, Lymington, Parkstone and Yarmouth.

An XOD is usually crewed competitively by three people, although it is possible to sail with two. The spinnaker can be hoisted without the crew leaving the cockpit.

The XOD fleet is an important part of Cowes Week one of the longest-running regular regattas in the world. XOD's were first raced in August 1911. 2011 marked the Centenary year with an unprecedented 145 entries in Cowes Week. The X Class continues to hold a special place in the event with over 80 yachts racing in the 2014 Cowes Week regatta. This regatta included a yacht originally built over a century ago in 1911 named Madcap - sail number X5.

The oldest XOD - X1 Mistletoe belongs to The National Maritime Museum of Greenwich, London. It is on display in Cowes, Isle of Wight at the Classic Boat Museum.

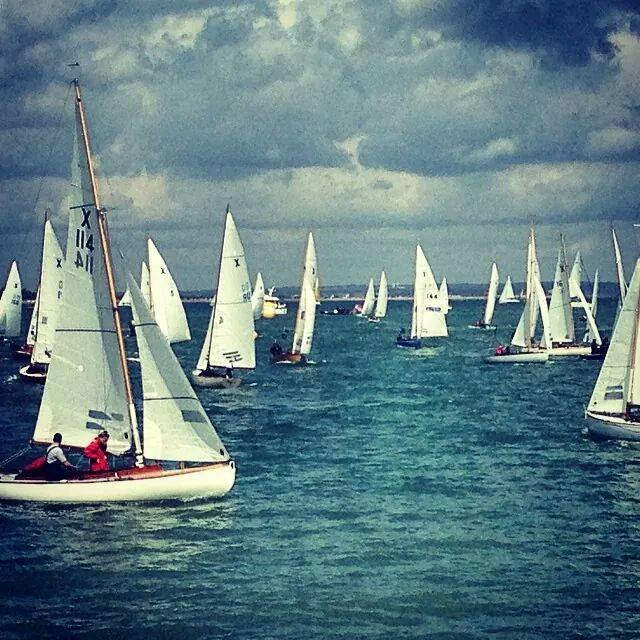
XOD Class Cowes Week 2014

== XOD Fleet ==
Sail no.	Boat name	Build Year
X1	MISTLETOE	1909
X2	PALASSIE	1930
X3	SILHOUETTE	1933
X4	WESTWIND	1929
X5	MADCAP	1911
X6	COQUETTE	1912
X7	SENEX	1923
X8	ANN EX	1929
X9	ZEST	1938
X10	IT	1924
X11	BOATSWAIN BIRD	1911
X12	DAWN	1924
X13	MISCHIEF	1927
X14	LINNET	1913
X15	KITTIWAKE	1925
X16	MYSTERY	1923
X17	XYLOTOX	1925
X18	NEFERTITI	1927
X19	CHATTERBOX	1925
X20	PUFFIN	1911
X21	SATU	1926
X22	SHRI	1926
X23	STARLIGHT	1926
X24	WINDFLOWER	1927
X25	MORVEN	1926
X26	CATHERINE	1923
X27	ESTELLE	1927
X28	ECSTASY	1927
X29	CORISANDE	1911
X30	ONWARD	1920
X31	FRIVOL	1927
X32	IBEX	1928
X33	CLAIR DE LUNE	1928
X34	MERSA	1928
X35	FOXY LADY	1928
X36	DOLPHIN	1928
X37	ARIEL	1928
X38	EXILE	1928
X39	GONE AWAY	1928
X40	KYPERINI	1929
X41	SPHEX	1929
X42	JULIA	1929
X43	MOONFLEET	1929
X44	AJAX	1929
X45	JEWEL	1929
X46	MARK III	1929
X47	VANITY	1930
X48	XL	1930
X49	ROSALITA	1930
X50	XCITATION	1930
X51	ATHENA	1934
X52	ANITRA	1935
X53	QUEST	1935
X54	LARK	1935
X55	FALCONET	1935
X56	XANTHUS	1935
X57	RED CORAL	1935
X58	MADELEINE	1935
X59	IONA	1935
X60	PERIDOT	1935
X61	SILVER WIND	1935
X62	JOSEPHINE	1936
X63	ASTRA	1936
X64	LIGHTWOOD	1936
X65	VERONIQUE	1936
X66	VEXILLA	1936
X67	TYPHOO	1937
X68	SOUTHWIND	1937
X69	HELENA	1937
X70	JANEX	1937
X71	WENDA	1937
X72	VENUS	1937
X73	ZEPHYR	1938
X74	FIONA	1938
X75	DELIGHT	1938
X76	MYRTLE	1937
X77	SUNSHINE	1939
X78	OWAISSA	1939
X79	SNOOKS	1946
X80	LASS	1946
X81	SAPPHIRE	1946
X82	MAGIC DRAGON	1947
X83	SEAMIST	1947
X84	NANETTE	1947
X85	HARLEQUIN	1947
X86	AORA	1947
X87	EXCALIBUR	1948
X88	TING HOW	1948
X89	JINX	1948
X90	CALYPSO	1949
X91	ASTRALITA	1949
X92	PERSEPHONE	1949
X93	MARGARET	1949
X94	SIRENA	1949
X95	X-RATED	1952
X96	FANTASY	1952
X97	BLACKTAIL	1952
X98	WAXWING	1952
X99	XIN BAI	1953
X100	MARY TUDOR	1953
X101	THORA	1953
X102	WHISKEY JOHNNY	1953
X103	MINX	1954
X104	GENEVIEVE	1954
X105	BLUE PHANTOM	1954
X106	SANDPIPER	1954
X107	CAROLET	1955
X108	LEADING WIND	1955
X109	AMBER	1955
X110	BETOX	1956
X111	ANNABEL	1957
X112	XEBEC	1957
X113	EXODUS	1959
X114	CARIAD	1959
X115	MIX	1959
X116	THALIA	1959
X117	X-RAY	1959
X118	ELICIA	1960
X119	LONE STAR	1960
X120	MORENA	1960
X121	CURLEW	1960
X122	EVE	1960
X123	LARA	1960
X124	KATHLEEN	1961
X125	ARROW	1961
X126	MINUET	1960
X127	RACHEL	1960
X128	LITTLE X	1960
X129	VIXEN	1960
X130	ILEX	1960
X131	EXIT	1962
X132	HARMONY	1962
X133	LEDA	1962
X134	WHISPER	1962
X135	MOLLYMAWK	1962
X136	LAFIA	1962
X137	RIPPLE	1962
X138	SPRAY	1962
X139	HALCYON	1962
X140	LUCREZIA	1962
X141	MADAME X	1962
X142	DOLCE VITA	1963
X143	SKIFFLE	1963
X144	LA MOUETTE	1963
X145	FIREBIRD	1963
X146	CAPRICE	1963
X147	FOXY	1963
X148	SIRIUS	1964
X149	SKUA	1965
X150	PEPPER	1965
X151	XANADU	1965
X152	BEAVER	1965
X153	SANS SOUCI	1965
X154	DROVER	1967
X155	WHIMBREL	1967
X156	GLEAM	1967
X157	SOX	1967
X158	TERRAPIN	1967
X159	DUX	1967
X160	MERLIN	1969
X161	MAYDAY	1969
X162	XENIA	1971
X163	MISS T	1971
X164	DIANA	1971
X165	TORTOISE	1971
X166	SWALLOW	1971
X167	XERXES	1972
X168	PARTNERSHIP	1973
X169	PERDIX	1973
X170	OYSTER	1974
X171	XACTLY	1974
X172	LIZZ WHIZZ	1974
X173	TONIC	1974
X174	FOXGLOVE	1974
X175	GIN	1975
X176	CRUMPET	1976
X177	RELAXATION	1977
X178	BEATRIX	1977
X179	XPEDITIOUS	1979
X180	FEARLESS	1978
X181	XTRAVAGANCE	1980
X182	SWEET X	1984
X183	CONDOR	1986
X184	QUIXOTIC	1987
X185		
X186	PHOENIX	1989
X187	ZOE	1989
X188	PRINCESS JALINA	1989
X189	ONYX	1989
X190	WAVERLEY	1989
X191	JUDY	1991
X192	FELIX	1993
X193	SAWDUST	1994
X194	ALVINE X	1994
X195		
X196	SARANNA	2007
X197	EXPLOSIVE	2005
