= Liquideep =

South African-based house music duo

- Liquideep Performing in Blankets and Wine 40, Nairobi

Background information
- Origin: Johannesburg, South Africa
- Genres: Soul; house; R&B
- Years active: 2007–
- Label: Mentalwave
- Members: Jonathan ‘Ziyon’ Hamilton; Thabo ‘Ryzor’ Shokgolo
- Website: liquideep.com

Liquideep is a soul and house duo formed in Johannesburg, South Africa in 2007. The group was formed by Ziyon (artist/songwriter/producer) and Ryzor (DJ/producer).

Its members were signed to independent record label Mentalwave Records and afterwards released their record-setting debut album Oscillations in 2009. In 2010 they cemented their place in history with the multi-platinum selling album Fabrics of the Heart.

== History ==
=== Formation and first years: 2007–2009 ===
Liquideep is composed of Thabo ‘Ryzor’ Shokgolo (DJ/producer) and Jonathan ‘Ziyon’ Hamilton (artist/producer). American-born Ziyon, who is a musician and producer, moved to South Africa in 2004 and became really intrigued with the house music culture. In 2006, he met Alexandra native Ryzor through a mutual friend. The meeting was a timely one, as Ryzor was a DJ and Ziyon was interested in learning how to DJ. Since Ryzor wanted to learn how to produce music, the two decided to exchange skills, with Ziyon teaching Ryzor music production and Ryzor teaching Ziyon to DJ.

=== 2010-2014: Fabrics of the Heart, Welcome Aboard ===
Even though they never expected the song "Fairytale" to be so big, when the song was sealed, they were very happy with it. The song, according to the duo, was inspired by a split experienced by one of them. The song has captured many music lovers' attention across the country and hasn't lost the momentum since it was released.

On May 25, 2010, their album Fabrics of the Heart was released. Fabrics of the Heart won Album of the Year at 17th South African Music Awards. As for the duo's future plans, Ziyon reveals that Liquideep is composed of two proper musicians and are in the process of putting together a full live band for their stage performances.

Since the success of their smash single "Fairytale" they have shared stages with huge American superstars Akon and Angie Stone and their marketable slick looks have gotten them endorsements from major corporations Chevrolet (General Motors), clothing line Ben Sherman, Sunglass Hut and Rodamat Shuttle.

In January 2013, Liquideep released their latest album, Welcome Aboard, and is currently touring to promote their newest album Liquideep was nominated for Best African Act at 2013 MOBO Awards.

== Musical style ==
Liquideep claims influence from Africa's beats with global appeal due to being well traveled, respect for different cultures, and love for the arts. The duo prefer playing their music to a crowd, where they claim to get an honest opinion.

== Discography ==
- Deep Part I (2008)
- Deep Part II (2008)
- Oscillations (2009)
- Fabrics of the Heart (2010)
- Ministry Of Sound - The Annual 2012 (2012)
- Alone (2012)
- Welcome Aboard (2013)

== Awards ==
- South African Music Awards - Album of the Year: Liquideep
- MTV Africa Music Awards 2010 - Song of the Year (South Africa): "Fairytale"
- Channel O Music Video Awards 2010 - Best Dance Video: "Fairytale" (South Africa)
- Channel O Music Video Awards 2011 - Most Gifted Duo, Group or Featuring Video: HHP & Teargas & Liquideep - "Born For This" (South Africa)
- Channel O Music Video Awards 2011 - Most Gifted African Southern Video Liquideep – Settle For Less
