= Lizha James =

Mozambican singer

Elisa Lisete James Humbane, popularly known as Lizha James, is a Mozambican musician.

== Awards and prizes ==
=== Won ===
- 2005 - Prize TVZINE for Best Singer (Mozambique)
- 2006 Channel O Music Video Awards - Best Female Video (4 all ya)
- 2007 Channel O Music Video Awards - Best R&B Video (Nuna Wa Mina)
- 2007 Afro Music Channel Awards - Best African Song (Nuna Wa Mina)
- 2008 Channel O Music Video Awards - Best Female Video (Nita Mukuma Kwini)
- 2009 Channel O Music Video Awards - Best Southern African (Estilo Xakhale)

=== Nominations ===
- 2012 Channel O Music Video Awards - Best Female Video ("Leva Boy" featuring Perola)
- 2014 MTV Africa Music Awards - Best Lusophone
- 2014 African Muzik Magazine Awards - Best Female Southern Africa

== Sources ==
- MTV Base
- Afro Music Channel
- Lizha James: The Wedding of the Year (Portuguese)
