= Sasha P =

Nigerian singer and lawyer

- Also known as: First Lady of Nigerian Hip Hop
- Born: Anthonia Yetunde Alabi; 21 June 1983 (age 42); Ibadan, Oyo State, Nigeria
- Origin: Lagos, Nigeria
- Genres: Hip hop
- Occupations: Recording artist; entertainer; fashion designer; lawyer
- Years active: 1993–2014

Sasha P (born Anthonia Yetunde Alabi on 21 May 1983), also known as the "First Lady of Nigerian Hip Hop", is a Nigerian rapper, musician, businesswoman, lawyer, and motivational speaker.

== Early life and education ==
The last of eight children, she was raised by her single mother, an educator, whom she fondly called Sisi Fadekemi, after her father died. She began her musical career as a child in Ibadan. She attended the International School Ibadan and the University of Lagos earning a bachelor's degree in Law.

== Music career ==
"I believe as an individual, I have a social responsibility to make a difference any way I can" "

— Sasha speaking about giving back to the community

Sasha P gained success at a time when there were very few Nigerian women in Hip Hop music. Subsequently, her success helped pave the way for other female rappers and musicians in Nigerian hip hop. She began musical collaborations and was signed on to eLDee's Trybe records. Sasha P has remained one of the most prominent female artists in Nigeria since 2001, especially after the successful release of her debut album First Lady under her record label STORM. She has been nominated for various awards in Nigeria and abroad. She won the 2009 "Best Female Artist" award in the UK at the Women in Entertainment Awards for her first single titled "Adara". She was also nominated in dual categories (Best Female Video and Best Cinematography) by the SoundCity Video Music Awards for her second single Only One in 2009.

She was the first ever Nigerian female artist to perform at the 20th anniversary of the World Music Awards in October 2008. She was also the first Nigerian female artiste to win the Best Female Award at MTV Africa Music Awards (MAMA). Besides Adara, She released Gidi Babe on her birthday in 2009. She released a single in 2012 titled Bad Girl P.

In 2013, Sasha P revealed that she was taking a break from the music scene to focus on her fashion business.

== Endorsements ==
Sasha P was endorsed as a brand ambassador for Etisalat. She is also a cultural ambassador for her home state, Ekiti.

== Fashion business ==
She created Nigerian high street fashion in December 2011 at L'Espace. In August 2012 she launched her own clothing label, Eclectic by Sasha, designed by herself.

== Humanitarian work ==
In regard to community service, Sasha P said, "I believe as an individual, I have a social responsibility to make a difference any way I can", and this she has done consistently over the years. She was part of the "Save a street child" campaign in Lagos (January 2009) and the "Maternal Mortality" project (May 2009) which aims to educate and help cater to the needs of young mothers who seek adequate medical care. She is also a motivational speaker and has worked with a campaign to end violence against women. In 2012, Sasha P was the Olympic torch bearer for Nigeria.

== Discography ==
- First Lady (2006)
- Gidi Babe (2009)

== Singles ==
- Oya (2002)
- Work it (2002)
- Emi Le Gan (2003)
- Adara (2008)
- Only One (2009)
- Bad Girl P (2012)
- Falling in Love (2014)

== Awards and nominations ==
Amen Awards

Year	Nominee / work	Award	Result	Ref
2004	Sasha for "Emi Le Gan"	Best Upcoming Artiste	Nominated	

Women in Entertainment Video Awards

Year	Nominee / work	Award	Result	Ref
2009	Sasha for "Adara"	Best Female Artiste	Won	

Channel O Music Video Awards

Year	Nominee / work	Award	Result	Ref
2009	"Only One'	Best Female Video	Won	

Kora Awards

Year	Nominee / work	Award	Result	Ref
2010	Herself	Best Hip Hop Act in Africa	Nominated	

MTV Africa Music Awards

Year	Nominee / work	Award	Result	Ref
2010	Herself	Best Female Artiste	Won	

Sound City Music Video Awards

Year	Nominee / work	Award	Result	Ref
2009	"Only One"	Best Female Video	Nominated	
2009	"Only One"	Best Cinematography	Nominated	
