= J. Martins =

Nigerian musician

J Martins
- Born: Martins Okey Justice; 29 September 1979 (age 46); Onitsha, Anambra State, Nigeria.
- Occupations: Singer, songwriter, producer

Martins Okey Justice E. (born September 29, 1979), professionally known as J. Martins, is a Nigerian musician, singer, songwriter and producer. He is best known for his songs "Oyoyo", "Jupa", and "Good Or Bad", and cool temper J. Martins is also known to have featured on the song by P-Square, "E No Easy". He has also featured Phyno, YCEE, Fally Ipupa, DJ Arafat, Koffi Olomide, Timaya.

== Early life ==
J. Martins was born in Onitsha, Anambra State, Nigeria, and has family roots in Ohafia, Abia State.

== Discography ==
- "Get Serious" (2008)
- "Elevated" (2009)
- "Selah" (2012)
- "Authenthic" (2016)

=== Selected singles ===
Year	Title	Album	Ref
2021	"Sote"	Non-album single	
