= Pearl of Africa Music Awards =

Music award ceremony

The Pearl of Africa Music Awards (also known as the PAM Awards) was an annual national music award event held in Uganda. The inaugural event was held in 2003. In 2006, categories for musicians from other East African countries were introduced.

Winners were selected by a combination of a panel of judges and a public vote.

The 2010 Pearl of Africa Music Awards were held in November. Bebe Cool was named Artiste of the Year, Best Reggae Artiste, and also won Album of the Year for Kasepiki. Iryn Namubiru was named Best Female Artiste, while Radio and Weasel won Best Male Artistes. Other winners included Eddie Kenzo (Best New Artiste), Navio (Best Video and Best Hip Hop Artiste), and Jose Chameleone (Best Afro-Beats Artiste).

The 2011 edition was held on 5 November.
