= Reminisce discography =

Artist discography

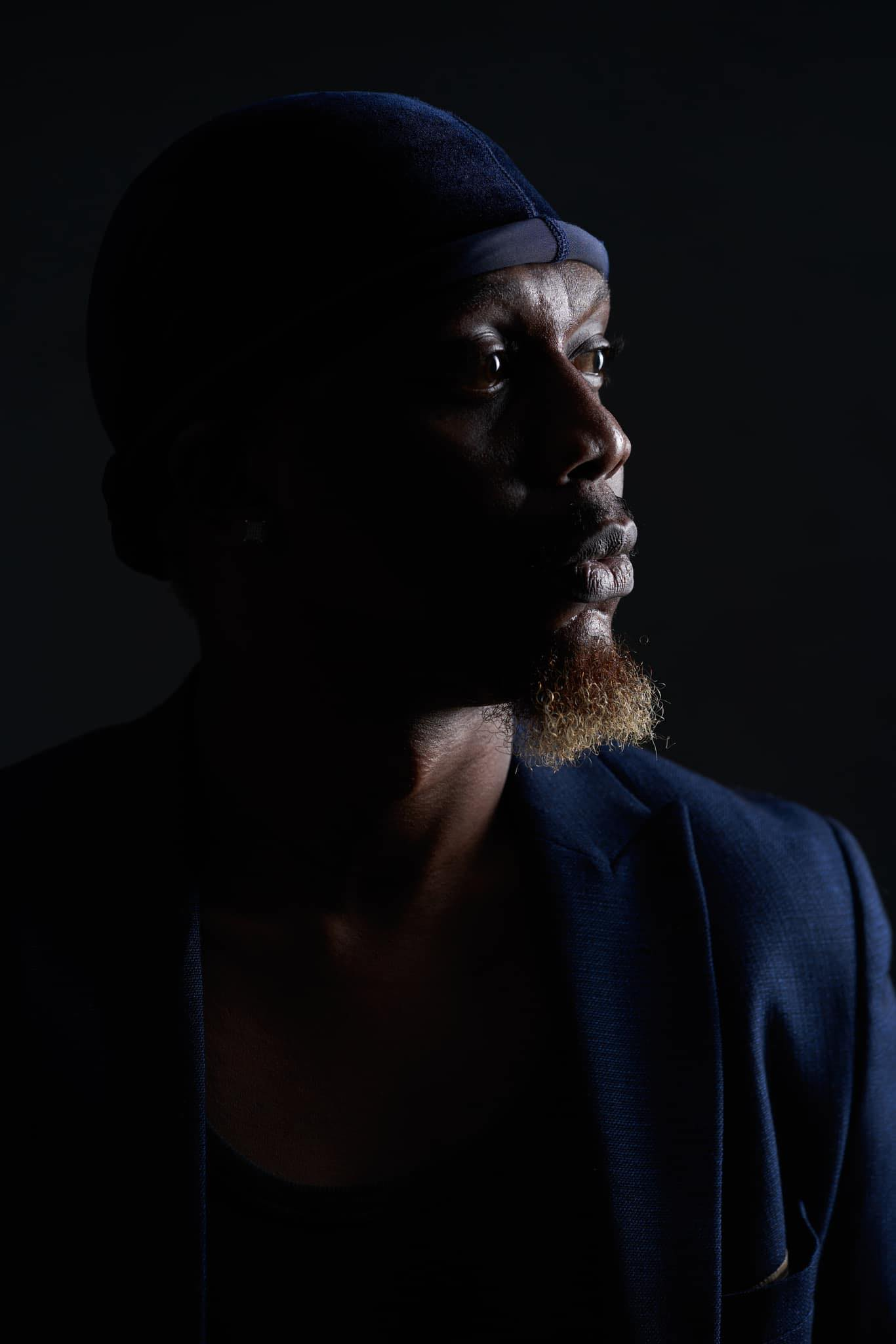
- Studio albums: 5
- Singles: 172
- Music videos: 88
- Extended plays: 2
- Promotional singles: 3

The discography of Nigerian rapper Reminisce consists of five studio albums, two extended plays, one-hundred and seventy-two singles (including one-hundred and twenty as featured artist), three promotional singles, and eighty-eight music videos. Born Remilekun Khalid Safaru on January 26 in Kaduna State, he is originally from Ajilete, Yewa South in Ogun State. He began his music career in the mid-2000s under producer ID Cabasa and the Coded Tunes collective, recording his first official single "One Chance" in 2008 after featuring on 9ice’s Gongo Aso album. Reminisce released his debut studio album Book of Rap Stories in 2012, followed by Alaga Ibile in 2013, which included guest appearances from Wizkid, Davido, and Olamide. His third album, Baba Hafusa (2015), debuted at number 12 on the Billboard World Albums Chart. He later released El-Hadj (2016) and the Vibes & Insha Allah EP (2020). On 27 October 2023, Reminisce released ATSG, Vol. 1, his fifth studio album.

== Studio albums ==
Title	Album details
Book of Rap Stories	Released: 31 March 2012; Label: Edge Records; Format: CD, digital download
Alaga Ibile	Released: 15 November 2013; Label: Edge Records, LRR Entertainment; Format: CD, digital download
Baba Hafusa	Released: 30 April 2015; Label: Edge Records, LRR Entertainment; Format: CD, digital download
El-Hadj	Released: 29 August 2016; Label: LRR Entertainment; Format: CD, digital download
ATSG, Vol. 1	Released: 27 October 2023; Label: LRR Entertainment; Format: Streaming, digital download

== Extended plays ==
Title	Album details
Vibes & Insha Allah	Released: 29 July 2020; Label: LRR Entertainment; Format: Streaming, digital download
Sui Generis	Released: 27 September 2024; Label: LRR Entertainment; Format: Streaming, digital download

== Singles ==
=== As lead artist ===
List of singles as lead artist, showing year released and album name
Title	Year	Album
"One Chance" (featuring Jahbless and Alash)	2009	Non-album single
"Ever Since" (featuring 9ice)	2010	Book of Rap Stories
"Kako Bi Chicken"	2011	Book of Rap Stories
"2Mussh" (solo or remix featuring Sauce Kid and Ice Prince)	2012	Book of Rap Stories
"If Only"	2012	Book of Rap Stories
"Nigboro"	2013	Alaga Ibile
"Government" (featuring Olamide and Endia)	2013	Alaga Ibile
"Koboko"	2013	Non-album single
"Fantasi"	2013	Alaga Ibile
"3rd World Thug"	2013	Alaga Ibile
"Sunkere"	2013	Alaga Ibile
"Eleniyan" (featuring Wizkid)	2013	Alaga Ibile
"Daddy" (featuring Davido)	2013	Alaga Ibile
"Tesojue"	2014	Baba Hafusa
"Local Rappers" (featuring Olamide and Phyno)	2015	Baba Hafusa
"Skilashi"	2015	Baba Hafusa
"Kpomo"	2015	Non-album singles
"Gboriduro"	2015	Non-album singles
"Poison"	2015	Non-album singles
"Kpomo (Remix)" (featuring Seriki, Lil Kesh, Falz, and CDQ)	2015	Non-album singles
"Angelina"	2016	Non-album singles
"Asalamalekun"	2016	El-Hadj
"Asalamalekun (Remix)" (featuring Wale)	2016	Non-album single
"Owo Re"	2016	El-Hadj
"Nobody Knows" (featuring 2Baba)	2016	El-Hadj
"Konsignment"	2016	El-Hadj
"Level Yen"	2017	Non-album singles
"Ponmile"	2017	Non-album singles
"Do You Feel It?"	2017	Non-album singles
"Problem"	2018	Non-album singles
"Ajigijaga"	2018	Non-album singles
"Faize Yi" (with ShodyTheTurnUpKing and Falz)	2018	Non-album singles
"Burushaga"	2018	Non-album singles
"Oja"	2019	Non-album singles
"Jensimi" (featuring Niniola)	2019	Non-album singles
"OGB4IG"	2019	Non-album singles
"Instagram" (featuring Olamide, Naira Marley, and Sarz)	2019	Non-album singles
"Prosperity" (featuring Falz)	2020	Non-album singles
"Ogaranya" (featuring Fireboy DML)	2020	Vibes and Insha Allah
"Toxic" (featuring Adekunle Gold)	2020	Non-album singles
"Omo X 100" (featuring Olamide)	2021	Non-album singles
"Hello Ẹ" (featuring Westsyde)	2021	Non-album singles
"Alaye Toh Se Gogo"	2022	Non-album singles
"Hustle" (featuring Bnxn and D Smoke)	2022	ATSG, Vol. 1
"Overdose" (featuring Simi)	2022	Non-album single
"Shina Peters" (featuring MohBad)	2023	ATSG, Vol. 1
"E.N.K.R"	2023	Non-album single
"Why?" (featuring Oxlade)	2023	ATSG, Vol. 1
"Up As Fxck" (featuring Bad Boy Timz)	2024	Sui Generis
"Kupe"	2024	Sui Generis

=== As featured artist ===
List of singles as featured artist, showing year released and album name
Title	Year	Album
"Joor Oh" (Jahbless featuring Lord of Ajasa and Reminisce)	2010	Rebirth
"Calabar Loni Shan" (XP featuring Reminisce)	2010	Non-album single
"My Pain" (Sheyman featuring Reminisce, Durella, eLDee, Omawumi, Jahbless, Lord of Ajasa, Ruggedman, Banky W., T-Code, Dude Tetsola, Waje, Bigiano, Kel, Ay.com, and Jaywon)	2010	King of Melody
"BB Pin (Remix)" (Misturr Montana featuring Cartiar, Eva, Dee-Splash, Reminisce, and Cee-Jay)	2011	Non-album single
"Friend or Foe" (Kleverjay featuring Ice Prince)	2011	Non-album single
"Gugu Gaga" (DJ Don X featuring Nollege Wizdumb, Shadow, Reminisce, and XP)	2011	Non-album single
"Agolo" (Sexy Steel featuring Reminisce)	2011	Non-album single
"Bere Mole" (Jahbless featuring Reminisce)	2011	Overground
"Ojukan" (Tupengo featuring Skales, Seriki, Reminisce, Phenom, Kel, and Patoranking)	2011	Resurrection
"Tentebo (Remix)" (Zee-World featuring YQ, Reminisce, Enny, and Skales)	2011	Non-album single
"Se Mi Bi Boda" (J.O.H.N featuring Reminisce and Jahbless)	2012	Non-album single
"I No Send You (Final)" (Tha Suspect featuring Teeto, Ice Prince, Skales, Reminisce, Eedris Abdulkareem, and DJ Neptune)	2012	Non-album single
"Baale Baale (Remix)" (Pope Da Hitman featuring 9ice and Reminisce)	2012	Non-album single
"Your Name" (Sabi featuring Reminisce)	2012	Non-album single
"Ta Le Nu" (Ultra featuring Reminisce)	2012	Non-album single
"Celebrate" (Sammy West featuring Reminisce)	2012	Non-album single
"Owo" (Indomix featuring Sound Sultan, Reminisce, W4, TM9ja, Minjin, and Ruggedman)	2012	Non-album single
"Uku Uku" (Jahbless featuring Reminisce)	2012	Non-album single
"B.L.O.O.D" (Terry G featuring Reminisce)	2012	Non-album single
"Home and Away" (El Phlex featuring Reminisce)	2012	Non-album single
"Calabar Loni Shan (Remix)" (XP featuring Reminisce, Olamide, and Skales)	2013	Non-album single
"Omo Naija (Remix)" (Phenom featuring Skales and Reminisce)	2013	Non-album single
"Koleyewon (Remix)" (TeeSongz featuring Reminisce)	2013	Non-album single
"Jen Mo E (Remix)" (Sossick featuring Reminisce and YQ)	2013	Non-album single
"Emi Ni Oba" (DJ Neptune featuring Dagrin, Ruggedman, Uzi, Reminisce, and Pope)	2013	Non-album single
"Abule Lawa (Remix)" (Artquake featuring Jahbless, Reminisce, and Seriki)	2013	Non-album single
"Spartacus Reloaded" (Shyne-D featuring Pasuma, 9ice, Reminisce, Jaywon, Smoothy, Seriki, and Splash)	2013	Non-album single
"Don't Mess With My Doe" (Sossick featuring Olamide and Reminisce)	2013	Non-album single
"Fans Mi" (Terry Tha Rapman, OD, and Pherowshuz featuring Reminisce)	2013	Non-album single
"Dobale" (Otis Maho featuring Reminisce)	2013	Non-album single
"Owu No Dey Touch" (Naeto C featuring Reminisce)	2013	Non-album single
"Work" (KayD featuring Reminisce)	2013	Non-album single
"Jo Dada" (M.Tal featuring Reminisce and Kalaski)		Non-album single
"8 Figures" (Ruggedman featuring Reminisce)		Non-album single
"Jaforie" (Obesere featuring Reminisce and Ransome)		Non-album single
"Gbo Gbo Ile" (ODH featuring Reminisce)	2014	Non-album single
"Ise Yen (Work)" (Sarz featuring Reminisce)	2014	Non-album single
"Wazobia" (Morell featuring Reminisce and Phyno)	2014	Non-album single
"Kilogbe (Remix)" (Sean Tizzle featuring Reminisce and Olamide)	2014	The Journey
"Sexy Lady" (Yemi Rush featuring Reminisce)	2014	Non-album singles
"Salamualekun (Remix)" (Hakym featuring Reminisce and Patoranking)	2014	Non-album singles
"Igboro" (Vikee featuring Reminisce)	2014	Non-album singles
"Tana Wole (Remix)" (Jaywon featuring Reminisce)	2014	Non-album singles
"Kilode" (Kilode featuring Reminisce)	2014	Non-album singles
"Kill Yourself" (Project RRS featuring Reminisce and Sossick)	2014	Non-album singles
"Finish Line (Remix)" (Dee Moneey featuring Paedae, Ice Prince, Reminisce, J.Town, and M.anifest)	2014	Non-album singles
"Turn the Lights On" (Wale Effect featuring Reminisce)	2014	Non-album singles
"Ite Ego" (Frank Hult featuring Reminisce)	2014	Non-album singles
"Africa (Remix)" (Blackmagic featuring Vector, Phyno, and Reminisce)	2014	Non-album singles
"Pray to God" (Kid Konnect featuring Ice Prince and Reminisce)	2014	Non-album singles
"Paramo" (CC2 featuring Reminisce)	2014	Non-album singles
"BamBamBam" (Jibola featuring Reminisce)	2014	Non-album singles
"Lala Bambam (Encore)" (Silver Jae featuring J. Martins, MC Galaxy, and Reminisce)	2014	Non-album singles
"Dundu (Remix)" (Tundey featuring Reminisce)	2014	Igboro
"Mercy (Remix)" (Tyson featuring Reminisce)	2014	Non-album single
"Rock Right Now" (Sojay featuring Reminisce)	2014	Non-album single
"Bembe" (Tkay featuring Reminisce and Ice Prince)	2015	Non-album single
"Unconditional Love" (Mya K featuring Reminisce)	2015	Testify
"Gbemisoke" (VJ Adams featuring Pasuma and Reminisce)	2015	Non-album single
"69 Missed Calls" (Jahbless featuring Olamide, Reminisce, Lil Kesh, CDQ, and Chinko Ekun)	2015	I Am Me
"Packaging" (Lardy'D featuring Reminisce)	2015	Non-album singles
"Kilofa Packaging" (Cdkah featuring Reminisce)	2015	Non-album singles
"Igboro (Remix)" (Famous featuring Reminisce and Lopo)	2015	Non-album singles
"Obi (Remix)" (Skales featuring Reminisce and Pepenazi)	2015	Non-album singles
"King Kong (Remix)" (Vector featuring Phyno, Reminisce, ClassiQ, and Uzi)	2015	Non-album singles
"Magawu (Remix)" (TM9ja featuring Reminisce, Vector, and Sarkodie)	2015	Non-album singles
"I Love U So (Remix)" (TJan featuring Reminisce)	2015	Non-album singles
"The King Is Here" (D'banj featuring Reminisce)	2015	An Epic Journey
"Sugar Cane" (Sojay featuring Reminisce)	2015	Non-album singles
"Oyea Rappers (Remix)" (Modenine featuring Reminisce)	2015	Non-album singles
"Elegushi Spender" (Olalakeside featuring Reminisce and Oritse Femi)	2015	Non-album singles
"Banging" (Chopstix featuring Reminisce, CDQ, and Ceeza Milli)	2015	Non-album singles
"Magic" (Jay Dreamz featuring Reminisce)	2015	Non-album singles
"Clap" (Falz featuring Reminisce)	2015	Stories That Touch
"Nothing (Remix)" (Baba featuring Reminisce)	2015	Non-album singles
"Step 2 This" (Lord V featuring Reminisce)	2015	Non-album singles
"Owo" (Ceesky featuring Reminisce)	2015	Non-album singles
"Kanayo" (Eva Alordiah featuring Phyno and Reminisce)	2016	1960
"Bounce" (Oladips featuring Reminisce)	2016	Non-album singles
"This Feeling (Remix)" (Bolson featuring Reminisce)	2016	Non-album singles
"Sisi Eko (Remix)" (Subzilla featuring Reminisce and Tekno)	2016	Non-album singles
"Gbera (Remix)" (Small Doctor featuring Reminisce)	2016	Omo Iya Teacher Reloaded
"Oshe" (Del B featuring Wizkid and Reminisce)	2016	Non-album single
"In the Mood" (Tha Mayor featuring Reminisce)	2016	Non-album single
"Turn It On" (Black IQ featuring Reminisce)	2016	Non-album single
"Kule Lori" (Jaywon featuring Reminisce and Seriki)	2016	Oba Orin
"Work Work (Gbera)" (Ivan Edd featuring Phyno and Reminisce)	2016	Non-album singles
"Roger" (Phlex featuring Reminisce and Yung6ix)	2016	Non-album singles
"I Don't Fuck With Everybody" (Phenom featuring Ice Prince and Reminisce)	2016	Non-album singles
"Ibile (Remix)" (Lil Kesh featuring Reminsice)	2016	Non-album singles
"I Ain't Gat No Time (Remix)" (Pepenazi featuring Reminisce and Falz)	2016	My Coat of Many Colours
"Ana Haka" (ClassiQ featuring Reminisce)	2017	Non-album singles
"Erema Gucci" (Nero Banx featuring Reminisce)	2017	Non-album singles
"Excuse Me" (Valtino featuring Reminisce)	2017	Non-album singles
"Lalakukulala" (Oladips featuring Reminisce)	2017	Non-album singles
"Saka Manje" (Seriki featuring Reminisce)	2017	Non-album singles
"Kini Level (Remix)" (Klever Jay featuring Reminisce)	2018	Non-album singles
"Diet" (DJ Enimoney featuring Tiwa Savage, Reminisce, and Slimcase)	2018	Non-album singles
"Slay Mama" (DJ Xclusive featuring Reminisce)	2018	Non-album singles
"Is Allowed" (Rudeboy featuring Reminisce)	2018	Non-album singles
"Bodija" (Chinko Ekun featuring Reminisce)	2018	Non-album singles
"Original Gangster" (Sess featuring Adekunle Gold and Reminisce)	2018	Non-album singles
"Aye" (CDQ featuring Phyno and Reminisce)	2018	Ibile Mugabe
"Taka Sufe" (DJ Mewsic featuring Reminisce and Oladips)	2018	Non-album singles
"Small Girl Big God" (DJ Jimmy Jatt featuring Olamide and Reminisce)	2018	Non-album singles
"Shake" (Blaqboi featuring Reminisce)	2018	Non-album singles
"Poker" (Krizbeatz featuring Reminisce and Mayorkun)	2018	ADM (Afro Dance Music)
"2 Sekon" (DJ Mewsic featuring Reminisce and Oladips)	2018	Non-album singles
"Ori Owo" (D'Tunes featuring Skiibii and Reminisce)	2018	Non-album singles
"Fierce" (Laycon featuring Olamide and Reminisce)	2019	Non-album singles
"Shibinshi (Eyan Ekerencha)" (DJ Enimoney featuring Olamide and Reminisce)	2019	Non-album singles
"Oloun" (Mr Real featuring Phyno, Reminisce, and DJ Kaywise)	2019	Non-album singles
"Baba Abule" (Aramide featuring Reminisce)	2019	Non-album singles
"Edi" (DJ Spinall featuring Reminisce)	2019	Grace
"Shenk Who Shenk You" (BOD featuring Reminisce)	2019	Non-album single
"Oja Majemi" (9ice featuring Olamide and Reminisce)	2020	Tip of the Iceberg Episode 1
"Only Mouth" (Rasz featuring Duncan Mighty and Reminisce)	2020	Non-album singles
"Bullion Van (Remix)" (Brillsta featuring Reminisce)	2021	Non-album singles
"Big Shirt & Boxers" (DOTTi The Deity featuring Reminisce)	2024	Non-album singles

== Promotional singles ==
List of promotional singles
Title	Year	Album
"Gbabe" (featuring Dagrin and XP)	2009	Book of Rap Stories
"Caro"	2009	Book of Rap Stories
"Ata (Kitchen Street Reply)"	2012	Non-album single
"Gbon Gbon" (featuring Ruggedman and Minjin)	2012	Book of Rap Stories
"Intro (Reminisce)"	2013	Alaga Ibile
"Agidigbo"	2013	Alaga Ibile
"Hurricane" (featuring PayBac)	2013	Non-album single

== Guest appearances ==
List of non-single guest appearances, with other performing artists, showing year released and album name
Title	Year	Other artist(s)	Album	Release date
"Bachelor's Life"	2008	9ice, Six O, XP	Gongo Aso	15 March 2008
"Legendary Hustlers"	2011	Olamide, 9ice	Rapsodi	21 March 2011
"Industreet (Cypher)"	2012	Olamide, Base One	YBNL	12 November 2012
"Don't Run"	2013	Burna Boy, Olamide	L.I.F.E	12 August 2013
"Eleda Masun (Remix)"	2014	Seriki	Seriki's Diary	22 April 2014
"Eeba"	2014	DJ Jimmy Jatt, Sossick, Sarz	The Industry, Vol. 1	17 August 2014
"Shekpe"	2014	M.I	The Chairman	30 October 2014
"Hustle Loyalty Respect"	2014	Olamide	Street OT	14 November 2014
"Fiyenle"	2015	DJ Spinall, Sojay, Kimz	My Story: The Album	28 October 2015
"Bend It Over"	2017	Olamide, Timaya	Lagos Nawa	17 November 2017
"Faaji"	2019	Ajebutter22, Boj	Make E No Cause Fight 2	29 November 2019
"Tycoon"	2021	Show Dem Camp, Mojo	Clone Wars Vol. 5 - The Algorhythm	9 July 2021
"Layi Wasabi"	2025	Odumodublvck	Industry Machine	5 October 2025

== Covers and freestyles ==
List of covers and freestyles with release date
Title	Year	Release date
"Akada (freestyle)"	2012	31 August 2012
"Oloun'Nishola"	2012	13 October 2012
"Try Me (Cover)" (with Sojay and Base One)	2015	5 March 2015
"Who You Epp? (freestyle)"	2016	5 April 2016
"Cypher Sessions Vol. 1" (featuring CDQ, Vector, DJ Neptune, and Oladips)	2016	17 June 2016
"Feego (Cypher Sessions Vol. 2)" (featuring Seriki, Oladips, and Ice Prince)	2016	16 August 2016
"Polybag (Cypher Sessions Vol. 3)" (featuring Seriki, Oladips, and Ice Prince)	2017	18 March 2017

== Music videos ==
=== As lead artist ===
List of music videos as lead artist, showing date released and directors
Title	Video release date	Director(s)	Ref.
"Kako Bi Chicken"	30 December 2011	DJ Tee	
"If Only"	25 November 2012	Adasa Cookey	
"2Mussh"	29 January 2013	Luxury Pictures	
"Government" (featuring Olamide and Endia)	21 July 2013	HG2 Films	
"Fantasi"	29 October 2013	Unlimited L.A	
"Daddy" (featuring Davido)	24 January 2014	Patrick Elis	
"Sunkere"	28 February 2014	Accessways Production	
"Turn It Around" (featuring Sossick)	31 March 2014	Jassy Generation	
"3rd World Thug" / "Intro"	30 April 2014	Jassy Generation	
"Eleniyan" (featuring Wizkid)	30 September 2014	Mex	
"Tesojue"	4 December 2014	Mega Boi	
"Let It Be Known" (featuring Sojay)	26 January 2015	Jassy Generation	
"Local Rappers" (featuring Phyno and Olamide)	7 May 2015	Mex	
"Skilashi"	3 June 2015	Frizzle & Bizzle Films	
"Baba Hafusa"	6 August 2015	SM Productions	
"Alagbara" (featuring Sossick)	23 September 2015	Frizzle & Bizzle Films	
"Kpomo"	23 October 2015	Phoenix Media	
"Poison"	5 December 2015	Phoenix Media	
"Asalamalekun"	17 March 2016	Jassy Generation	
"Owo Re"	3 June 2016	Unlimited L.A	
"Ibadi" (featuring Sossick)	9 September 2016	Unlimited L.A	
"Feego" (featuring Seriki, Ice Prince, and Oladips)	24 October 2016	Unlimited L.A	
"If E No Be God" (featuring Mr Eazi)	31 October 2016	Unlimited L.A	
"Konsignment"	19 December 2016	Director Q	
"Where I Come From"	14 April 2017	Director Q	
"Ponmile"	4 August 2017	Clarence Peters	
"Problem"	9 March 2018	Clarence Peters	
"Oja"	2 April 2019	TG Omori	
"Instagram" (featuring Olamide, Naira Marley, and Sarz)	9 December 2019	TG Omori	
"Ogaranya" (featuring Fireboy DML)	31 July 2020	TG Omori	
"Gbedu"	14 August 2020	TG Omori	
"Overdose" (featuring Simi)	30 May 2022	Unlimited L.A	

=== As featured artist ===
List of music videos as lead artist, showing date released and directors
Title	Video release date	Director(s)	Ref.
"Joor Oh" (Jahbless featuring Lord of Ajasa and Reminsice)	13 February 2010	El Bambino	
"My Pain" (Sheyman featuring Reminisce, Durella, eLDee, Omawumi, Jahbless, Lord of Ajasa, Ruggedman, Banky W., T-Code, Dude Tetsola, Waje, Bigiano, Kel, Ay.com, and Jaywon)	19 May 2010	DJ Tee	
"Calabar Loni Shan" (XP featuring Reminisce)	3 December 2010		
"BB Pin (Remix)" (Misturr Montana featuring Cartiar, Eva, Dee-Splash, Reminisce, and Cee-Jay)	21 February 2011	James Oludare	
"Joor Oh (Remix)" (Misturr Montana featuring Cartiar, Eva, Dee-Splash, Reminisce, and Cee-Jay)	27 April 2011	DJ Tee	
"Friend or Foe" (Kleverjay featuring Reminisce)	8 November 2011	Akin Alabi	
"Bere Mole" (Jahbless featuring Reminisce)	19 November 2011	James Oludare	
"Ojukan (Remix)" (Tupengo featuring Skales, Seriki, Reminisce, Phenom, Kel, and Patoranking)	31 December 2011	Jassy Generation	
"Calabar Loni Shan (Remix)" (XP featuring Reminisce, Skales, and Olamide)	26 February 2013	Adasa Cookey	
"Uku Uku" (Jahbless featuring Reminisce)	27 May 2013	Champion Studio	
"Koleyewon (Remix)" (Tee Songz featuring Reminisce)	27 June 2013	23rd Productions	
"Fans Mi" (Terry Tha Rapman, OD, and Pherowshuz featuring Reminisce)	23 August 2013	R Cube	
"Dobale" (Otis Maho featuring Reminisce)	2 September 2013	Unlimited L.A	
"Home & Away" (El Phlex featuring Reminisce)	10 February 2014	HG2 Filmworks	
"Turn on the Lights" (Wale Effect featuring Reminisce)	8 July 2014	Tiannah Stylings	
"Ite Ego" (Frank Hult featuring Reminisce)	10 July 2014	Mex	
"Finish Line (Remix)" (Dee Moneey featuring Paedae, Ice Prince, Reminisce, J.Town, and M.anifest)	17 August 2014	David Nicol-Sey	
"Igboro" (Vikee featuring Reminisce)	29 August 2014	Clarence Peters	
"8 Figures" (Ruggedman featuring Reminisce)	6 September 2014	Adasa Cookey	
"Jaforie" (Obesere featuring Reminisce and Ransome)	24 September 2014	DJ Tee	
"BamBamBam" (Jibola featuring Reminisce)	14 February 2015	Adasa Cookey	
"Gbemisoke" (VJ Adams featuring Pasuma and Reminisce)	23 February 2015	Avalon Okpe	
"Africa (Remix)" (Blackmagic featuring Phyno, Reminisce, and Vector)	11 April 2015	Unlimited L.A	
"Tana Wole" (VJ Adams featuring Pasuma and Reminisce)	19 April 2015	Brotha Lee	
"69 Missed Calls" (Jahbless featuring Olamide, Reminisce, CDQ, Lil Kesh, and Chinko Ekun)	15 May 2015	Unlimited L.A	
"Tomorrow" (Oritse Femi featuring Reminisce)	7 July 2015	HG2 Filmworks	
"King Kong (Remix)" (Vector featuring Phyno, Reminisce, ClassiQ, and Uzi)	10 July 2015	Mattmax	
"I Love U So (Remix)" (TJan featuring Reminisce)	6 August 2015	Unlimited L.A	
"Abule Lawa (Remix)" (ArtQuake featuring Reminisce, Jahbless, and Seriki)	4 September 2015	Dudutoonz Production	
"Packaging" (Lardy'D featuring Reminisce)	20 September 2015	Mr Shabz	
"Clap" (Falz featuring Reminisce)	11 December 2015	Mex	
"Sugarcane" (Sojay featuring Reminisce)	14 December 2015	Director Q	
"Owo" (Ceesky featuring Reminisce)	22 February 2016	Frizzle and Bizzle Films	
"Sisi Eko (Remix)" (Subzilla featuring Reminisce and Tekno)	1 March 2016	Avalon Okpe	
"In the Mood" (Tha Mayor featuring Reminisce)	20 March 2016	SM Productions	
"Turn It On" (Black IQ featuring Reminisce)	22 March 2016	Clarence Peters	
"Bembe" (Tkay featuring Ice Prince and Reminisce)	27 April 2016	Unlimited L.A	
"Ibile (Remix)" (Lil Kesh featuring Reminisce)	17 October 2016	Clarence Peters	
"I Ain't Gat No Time (Remix)" (Pepenazi featuring Reminisce and Falz)	21 March 2017	Clarence Peters	
"Work Work (Gbera)" (Ivan Edd featuring Phyno and Reminisce)	20 May 2017	Avalon Okpe	
"Erema Gucci" (Nero Banx featuring Reminisce)	23 May 2017	Adamsgud	
"Lalakukulala" (Oladips featuring Reminisce)	2 March 2018	Stanz Visuals	
"Diet" (DJ Enimoney featuring Slimcase, Reminisce, and Tiwa Savage)	26 March 2018	Clarence Peters	
"Saka Manje" (Seriki featuring Reminisce)	27 April 2018	Frizzle and Bizzle Films	
"Bodija" (Chinko Ekun featuring Reminisce)	27 April 2018	Walinteen Pro	
"Aye" (CDQ featuring Phyno and Reminisce)	7 May 2018	Unlimited L.A	
"Slay Mama" (DJ Xclusive featuring Reminisce)	7 May 2018	Adasa Cookey	
"Poker" (Krizbeatz featuring Reminisce and Mayorkun)	7 September 2018	Dr. C	
"Small Girl Big God" (DJ Jimmy Jatt featuring Olamide and Reminisce)	5 October 2018	Adasa Cookey	
"Original Gangster" (Sess featuring Adekunle Gold and Reminisce)	11 December 2018	Kemi Adetiba	
"Oloun" (Mr Real featuring Phyno, Reminisce, and DJ Kaywise)	9 September 2019	Legendoreel Films	
"Edi" (DJ Spinall featuring Reminisce)	27 September 2019	TG Omori	
"Shenk Who Shenk You" (BOD featuring Reminisce)	8 October 2019	Cardoso Imagery	
"Shibinshi (Eyan Ekerencha)" (DJ Enimoney featuring Olamide and Reminisce)	10 October 2019	TG Omori	
"Bullion Van (Remix)" (Brillsta featuring Reminisce)	6 August 2021	Mattmax	
"Tycoon" (Show Dem Camp featuring Reminisce and Mojo)	4 September 2021	UAX Studios	
