= Sarz production discography =

This is the production discography of Nigerian record producer Osabuohien "Sarz" Osaretin.

== Singles produced ==
List of singles produced, showing performing artists, year released, album, and release date
Title	Artist	Year	Album
"Banging"	Ruggedman	2007	Non-album single
"See Drama"	Lord of Ajasa	2008	Second Turning by the Right
"King Kong"	Shank	2008	King Kong
"Kondo"	Dagrin	2009	C.E.O
"Gbabe" (featuring Dagrin and XP)	Reminisce	2009	Book of Rap Stories
"Caro"	Reminisce	2009	Book of Rap Stories
"I Like Girls"	YQ	2009	I Am YQ
"I Made It" (featuring Dagrin)	Iceberg Slim	2010	Non-album single
"Calabar Loni Shan" (featuring Reminisce)	XP	2010	Non-album single
"Ever Since" (featuring 9ice)	Reminisce	2010	Book of Rap Stories
"Joor Oh" (Remix) (featuring Ice Prince, eLDee, Ruggedman, Durella, and Reminisce)	Jahbless	2010	Overground
"Pop Sugar" (featuring Muna)	Michael Word	2010	Non-album singles
"Salute"	Shank	2011	Non-album singles
"Don't Touch My Body" (Celebration Remix)	Goldie Harvey	2011	Gold Reloaded
"So Beautiful"	Minjin	2011	Non-album single
"Kako Bi Chicken"	Reminisce	2011	Book of Rap Stories
"Higher" (featuring K9 and Sojay)	eLDee	2011	Undeniable
"Today-Today" (featuring K9 and Sojay)	eLDee	2011	Undeniable
"Wash Wash"	eLDee	2011	Undeniable
"Mukulu" (featuring K9 and Sojay)	Skales	2011	Non-album singles
"Keresimesi" (featuring Wizkid)	Skales	2011	Non-album singles
"Ghetto" (featuring K9 and Sojay)	Shank	2011	Non-album singles
"Salute" (Remix) (featuring Wizkid)	Shank	2011	Non-album singles
"Low Key"	Banky W.	2011	R&BW
"Get Low"	Capital F.E.M.I	2012	The Year of R'n'B
"Category"	eLDee	2012	Undeniable
"Dance for Me" (featuring Wizkid)	E.M.E	2012	Empire Mates State of Mind
"Get Down Tonight" (featuring Wizkid, Skales, and Banky W.)	E.M.E	2012	Empire Mates State of Mind
"Ko Mo Le" (featuring Skales)	E.M.E	2012	Empire Mates State of Mind
"Eziokwu" (featuring Ikechukwu, Illbliss, and Phyno)	Lynxxx	2012	Non-album singles
"Beat of Life (Samba)" (featuring Wizkid)	Sarz	2012	Non-album singles
"Calabar Loni Shan" (Remix) (featuring Reminisce, Olamide, and Skales)	XP	2013	Non-album singles
"Wish You Could Stay"	L.O.S	2013	Non-album singles
"Emi Ni Oba" (featuring Dagrin, Pope, Ruggedman, Phyno, Reminisce, and Uzi)	DJ Neptune	2013	Non-album singles
"Jaiye Jaiye" (featuring Femi Kuti)	Wizkid	2013	Ayo
"Mr. Sexy"	Lynxxx	2013	Non-album single
"Fantasi"	Reminisce	2013	Alaga Ibile
"Fancy You"	T.O.C	2013	Non-album singles
"Oga Pata Pata" (featuring Don Jazzy)	EL'Vee	2013	Non-album singles
"Show Your Talent"	Addiction	2013	Non-album singles
"Siwaju"	Waliyah	2013	Non-album singles
"Eleniyan" (featuring Wizkid)	Reminisce	2013	Alaga Ibile
"Rap It Up"	Posly TD	2013	Non-album singles
"Kay Happen"	XP	2013	Non-album singles
"Celebration" (featuring K9)	Sarz	2014	Non-album singles
"Ise Yen (Work)" (featuring Reminisce)	Sarz	2014	Non-album singles
"Ibadi"	Niniola	2014	Non-album singles
"Low Waist"	Samad	2014	Non-album singles
"You Are the One" (featuring Banky W.)	Jahbless	2014	Non-album singles
"Mumu for Your Love"	Kryptic	2014	Non-album singles
"Mercy"	Tyson Noir	2014	Non-album singles
"Shoknorris" (featuring Burna Boy)	Sarz	2014	Non-album singles
"Care About Us" (featuring Sound Sultan)	K9	2014	Non-album singles
"Get Up"	Kach	2014	Non-album singles
"Mercy" (Remix) (featuring Reminisce)	Tyson	2014	Non-album singles
"Anything"	Tekno	2014	Non-album singles
"Sound It"	Wizkid	2014	Non-album singles
"E Don Tey" (featuring M.I)	King Zamir	2015	Non-album singles
"Iyaniwura" (featuring Qdot)	XP	2015	Non-album singles
"Skilashi" (featuring Sojay)	Reminisce	2015	Baba Hafusa
"Kayefi" (featuring Sojay)	K9	2015	Non-album singles
"Expensive Shit"	Wizkid	2015	Non-album singles
"No Pressure"	Simba Tagz	2015	Non-album singles
"Lights" (featuring Ice Prince)	DJ Caise	2015	Non-album singles
"Soke"	Niniola	2015	Non-album singles
"Ashimapeyin"	Wande Coal	2015	Wanted
"Coded Tinz" (featuring Phyno and Chief Obi)	2Baba	2016	Non-album singles
"Drop It Low"	Stunnah Gee	2016	Non-album singles
"Bob Marley"	Omar Sterling	2016	Victory Through Harmony
"Asalamalekun"	Stunnah Gee	2016	El-Hadj
"Lagos City"	Caze	2016	Non-album singles
"Wicked"	Sarz and DJ Maphorisa	2016	Non-album singles
"One Dance" (featuring Wizkid and Kyla)	Drake	2016	Views
"Breaking News"	D'banj	2016	Non-album singles
"Get Up" (featuring Flash)	Sarz and DJ Tunez	2016	Non-album singles
"Sweet Love"	Wizkid	2017	Sounds from the Other Side
"Maradona"	Niniola	2017	This Is Me
"Come Closer" (featuring Drake)	Wizkid	2017	Sounds from the Other Side
"Be"	Tekno	2017	Non-album single
"African Bad Gyal" (featuring Chris Brown)	Wizkid	2017	Sounds from the Other Side
"Sicker"	Niniola	2017	This Is Me
"Lalakukulala" (featuring Reminisce)	Oladips	2017	Non-album singles
"Diet" (featuring Reminisce, Slimcase, and Tiwa Savage)	DJ Enimoney	2018	Non-album singles
"Magun" (Remix) (featuring Busiswa)	DJ Enimoney	2018	Non-album singles
"Energy (Stay Far Away)" (featuring Wizkid)	Skepta	2018	Non-album singles
"Bana"	Niniola	2018	Colours and Sounds
"Balanciego"	Flash	2018	Non-album single
"Keys to the City (Ogede)"	Mr Eazi	2018	Lagos to London
"Gimme Love" (featuring Runtown)	Seyi Shay	2018	Non-album single
"Designer" (featuring Sarz)	Niniola	2019	Colours and Sounds
"Oja"	Reminisce	2019	Non-album singles
"OGB4IG"	Reminisce	2019	Non-album singles
"Vex" (featuring Sarz)	Wande Coal	2019	Realms
"Omo Rapala"	Niniola	2019	Colours and Sounds
"Mad"	Sarz and Wurld	2019	I Love Girls with Trobul
"Instagram" (featuring Olamide, Naira Marley, and Sarz)	Reminisce	2019	Non-album single
"Tofunmi" (featuring Wande Coal and Sarz)	TDM		Non-album single
"Ogaranya" (featuring Fireboy DML)	Reminisce	2020	Vibes and Insha Allah
"Antidote" (featuring Adekunle Gold)	Nao	2021	And Then Life Was Beautiful
"Tonongo"	Lojay and Sarz	2021	LV N ATTN
"Hustle" (featuring Bnxn and D Smoke)	Reminisce	2022	ATSG, Vol. 1
"Monalisa" (Remix) (featuring Chris Brown)	Lojay and Sarz	2022	Non-album single
"Ijo (Laba Laba)"	Crayon	2022	Trench to Triumph
"Gwagwalada" (featuring Kizz Daniel and Seyi Vibez)	Bnxn	2023	Sincerely, Benson
"Yo Fam!" (featuring Skrillex and Crayon)	Sarz	2023	Non-album singles
"Not an Angel"	Tems	2023	Non-album singles
"Happiness" (featuring Asake and Gunna)	Sarz	2023	Protect Sarz At All Costs
"Billions" (featuring Lojay)	Sarz	2024	Protect Sarz At All Costs
"Active" (featuring Travis Scott)	Asake	2024	Lungu Boy
"TeTe"	Crayon	2024	Non-album singles
"Mega Money Mega"	Tiwa Savage	2024	Non-album singles
"C'mon Look!" (featuring Asake)	Sarz	2025	Non-album singles
"Somebody Like You"	Lojay	2025	Non-album singles
"Times Two"	Zeina	2025	Non-album singles

=== Promotional singles produced ===
List of promotional singles produced, showing performing artists, year released, album, and release date
Title	Artist	Year	Album
"Taste of My Melody" (featuring Durella)	Sheyman	2010	King of Melody
"Bad Man" (featuring Wizkid)	Sarz	2012	Non-album singles
"MTN iPulse"	Praiz, Wizkid, KCee, and Iyanya	2013	Non-album singles
"Dance Go (Eau de Vie)"	2Face Idibia and Wizkid	2014	Face 2 Face 10.0 and Hennessy Artistry
"No Be Water"	Vector, Burna Boy, and Praiz	2016	Hennessy Artistry

== Studio albums produced ==
Artist	Album	Year	Tracks produced
Dagrin	C.E.O	2009	#4 "Kondo"
Sheyman	King of Melody	2010	#8 "Taste of My Melody" (featuring Durella)
Goldie Harvey	Gold	2010	#13 "Don't Touch My Body"
Naeto C	Super C Season	2011	#1 "Super C Season"
Goldie Harvey	Gold Reloaded	2011	#3 "Gboko Lowo E" #4 "Don't Touch My Body" (Celebration Remix) #18 "Don't Touch My Body"
Reminisce	Book of Rap Stories	2012	#2 "Quality" #3 "Ever Since" (featuring 9ice) #6 "Gbabe" (featuring Dagrin and XP) #9 "Tinkin" (featuring Patoranking) #10 "Kako Bi Chicken" #12 "Caro"
E.M.E	Empire Mates State of Mind	2012	#2 "Get Down Tonight" (featuring Wizkid, Skales, and Banky W.) #11 "Ko Mo Le" (featuring Skales) #13 "Dance for Me" (featuring Wizkid) #15 "My Baby" (featuring Skales)
eLDee	Undeniable	2012	#1 "Higher" (featuring K9 and Sojay) #2 "Been There, Done That" #3 "Today-Today" #4 "Always (Temi's Song)" #5 "Rundown" (featuring Banky W.) #7 "Category" #8 "Wash Wash" #9 "Never Let You Go" (featuring Wizkid) #10 "Zombie" (featuring K9)
Capital F.E.M.I	The Year of R'n'B	2012	#2 "Go Low"
Omawumi	Lasso of Truth	2013	#9 "Warn Yourself" (featuring Wizkid)
Reminisce	Alaga Ibile	2013	#4 "Fantasi" #5 "Eleniyan" (featuring Wizkid) #16 "Nigboro" (bonus track)
Wizkid	Ayo	2014	#1 "Jaiye Jaiye" (featuring Femi Kuti) #11 "Kilofe"
Timaya	Epiphany	2014	#6 "Bad Man Tin"
M.I	The Chairman	2014	#3 "Rich" (featuring Koker) #5 "Shekpe"(featuring Reminisce) #7 "Wheel Barrow" (featuring Emmy Ace and Beenie Man)
Reminisce	Baba Hafusa	2015	#4 "Skilashi" (featuring Sojay) #11 "Otiya" #14 "Nothing" (featuring Vector and Sojay)
Wande Coal	Wanted	2015	#2 "Adura" #10 "Ashimapeyin" #19 "Wanted (Remix)" (featuring Burna Boy)
Burna Boy	On a Spaceship	2015	#14 "Trance"
Patoranking	God Over Everything	2016	#6 "This Kind Luv" (featuring Wizkid)
Reminisce	El-Hadj	2016	#1 "Asalamalekun" #5 "I.E.N.B.G" (featuring Mr Eazi)
Omar Sterling	Victory Through Harmony	2016	#9 "Bob Marley"
Mr Eazi	Accra to Lagos	2017	#7 "Accra to Lagos"
Wizkid	Sounds from the Other Side	2017	#1 "Sweet Love" #2 "Come Closer" (featuring Drake) #4 "African Bad Gyal" (featuring Chris Brown)
Niniola	This Is Me	2017	#6 "Maradona" #7 "Saro" #10 "Sicker" #11 "Magun"
Yemi Alade	Black Magic	2017	#2 "You"
Mr Eazi	Lagos to London	2018	#7 "Keys to the City (Ogede)"
Shayo Davids	Movement	2019	#1 "My Neighbour"
Patoranking	Wilmer	2019	#11 "Open Fire" (featuring Busiswa)
Sarz and Wurld	I Love Girls with Trobul	2019	#1 "Prisona" #2 "Trobul" #3 "Sweat" #4 "Focus" #5 "Mad" #6 "Nobody Wins Interlude" #7 "Ego" #8 "Sade"
Ajebutter22, BOJ, and Falz	Make E No Cause Fight 2	2019	#1 "Too Many Women"
Terri	Afro Series	2020	#4 "Ojoro"
Reminisce	Vibes and Insha Allah	2020	#4 "Ogaranya" (featuring Fireboy DML)
Wande Coal	Realms	2020	#6 "Vex" (featuring Sarz)
Niniola	Colours and Sounds	2020	#4 "Addicted" #12 "Designer" (featuring Sarz) #13 "Omo Rapala"
Shirazee	Lost	2020	#3 "African in New York" (featuring Sarz)
Lojay and Sarz	LV N ATTN	2021	#1 "Tonongo" #2 "Park O X3" #3 "LV N ATTN" (featuring Wizkid) #4 "Panty!" #5 "Monalisa"
Mizzle	In The Dark	2021	#5 "Confident" (featuring Sarz)
Obongjayar and Sarz	Sweetness	2021	#1 "Sweetness" #2 "Gone Girl" #3 "If You Say" #4 "Nobody"
Nao	And Then Life Was Beautiful	2021	#4 "Antidote" (featuring Adekunle Gold)
Wurld	My WurlD With U	2022	#7 "Sweet N Fine" (featuring Sarz)
Rema	Rave & Roses	2022	#1 "Divine"
CKay	Sad Romance	2022	#7 "Soja"
Miraa May	Tales of a Miracle	2023	#11 "Empress Me" (featuring Dyo)
Crayon	Trench to Triumph	2023	#3 "Ngozi" (featuring Ayra Starr) #4 "Ijo (Laba Laba)"
Bnxn	Sincerely, Benson	2023	#5 "Gwagwalada" (featuring Kizz Daniel and Seyi Vibez) #6 "Pidgin & English"
Reminisce	ATSG, Vol. 1	2023	#4 "Hustle" (featuring Bnxn and D Smoke)
Smallgod	Bridging The Gap	2024	#2 "Oh My Days" (featuring Haile and King Promise)
Ruger and Bnxn	RnB	2024	#4 "Ilashe"
Tems	Born in the Wild	2024	#6 "Get it Right" (featuring Asake)
Asake	Lungu Boy	2024	#5 "Worldwide" #6 "Active" (featuring Travis Scott) #10 "Mentally" #11 "Uhh Yeahh" #13 "Ligali"
Sarz	Protect Sarz At All Costs	2025	#1 "Grateful" (featuring Wurld and the Ndlovu Youth Choir) #2 "Happiness" (featuring Asake and Gunna) #3 "Getting Paid" (featuring Wizkid, Asake, and Skillibeng) #4 "Mademoiselle" (featuring Odumodublvck, Shallipopi, Theodora, and Zeina) #5 "BMF" (featuring Byron Messia and Fireboy DML) #6 "Body" (featuring Joeboy) #7 "In a Mustang" (featuring Qing Madi) #8 "Nice 'n' Slow" (featuring Wurld) #9 "Loved Me Then" (featuring Lojay) #10 "African Barbie" (featuring Teni) #11 "Up" (featuring Victony) #12 "Billions" (featuring Lojay)
