= The Beatz Awards 2015 =

Annual Nigerian music awards ceremony

- Date: December 17, 2015
- Location: Shell Hall, Muson Center, Onikan, Victoria Island
- Hosted by: Gordons; Angel Ufuoma

Television/radio coverage
- Network: Silverbird Television; Nigezie TV; wapTV; Television Continental; BEN Television; 98.9 Kiss FM Lagos; Rhythm 93.7 FM Lagos
- Produced by: Eliworld Int'l Limited

The 1st The Beatz Awards was held at Muson Center in Lagos on December 17, 2015. Nominees were revealed on November 13, 2015. The live show was televised on STV, Nigezie TV, wapTV, TVC and BEN Television, with host Gordons, and Angel Ufuoma.

== Performers ==
=== Presenters ===
- Gordons
- Angel Ufuoma

== Nominations and winners ==
The following is a list of nominees and the winners are listed highlighted in boldface.

Best Producer	New Discovery Producer
**Cobhams Asuquo** - (Timi Dakolo - "Wish Me Well"); Don Jazzy - (Korede Bello – "Godwin"); Sarz - (Wizkid – "Expensive Shit"); Masterkraft - (Masterkraft - "Indomie"); Young John - (Olamide - "Bobo"); Wole Oni – (Wole Oni – "Cover Me Lord"); D'Tunes - (Sean Tizzle - "Loke Loke")	**Young John** - (Olamide - "Bobo"); DJ Coublon - (Kiss Daniel - "Woju"); Baby Fresh - (Tolu - "Ifemi"); Selebobo - (Selebobo - "Miracle Girl"); DeeVee - (D'Banj - "Feeling the Nigga")
Best Afro Pop Producer	Best Afro Beat Producer
**Masterkraft** - (Flavour - "Power to Win"); Don Jazzy - (Di'Ja - "Awww"); Sarz - (Wande Coal - "Ashimapeyin"); Oscar Heman-Ackah - (Simi - "Jamb Question"); DeeVee - (D'Banj - "Feeling the Nigga")	**Legendury Beatz** - (Wizkid - "Ojuelegba"); Tee-Y Mix - (Bambo - "Ori Mi Wu"); Sarz - (Wizkid – "Expensive Shit"); Phat-E - (Liza C - "Oga Patapata"); Vtek - (Darey - "Asiko Laiye")
Best Afro R&B Producer	Best Afro Hip Hop Producer
**Cobhams Asuquo** - (Banky W. – "High Notes"); Wole Oni - (Priscilla - "IFE"); London Boys - (Iyanya – "Baby Daddy"); LeriQ - (LeriQ - "Say You Love Me"); Don Jazzy - (Tolu - "My Lover")	**D'Will** - (Ycee – "Jagaban"); Shizzi - (Davido feat. Meek Mill - "Fans Mi"); Liciouskrickit - (Vector - "King Kong"); Masterkraft - (Masterkraft - "Indomie"); Pheelz - (M.I Abaga - "Human Being")
Best Afro Rock Producer	Best Afro Highlife Producer
**Phat-E** - (Ejiro - "I Will Get There"); Florocka - (Florocka - "Soke Loke"); A4 - (A4 - "Stay On Him"); Mac Roc - (Mac Roc - "Yahweh")	**Don Jazzy** - (D'Prince – "Oga Titus"); Jez Blenda - (Timaya - "Hallelujah"); Charles Duke, Sammie Okposo - (Sammie Okposo – "Oboto"); Laitan Dada, Rotimikeys - (Laitan Dada - "Sweetelele"); Del B - (Seyi Shay - "Jangilova")
Best Afro Soul Producer	Best Afro Dancehall Producer
**Oscar Heman-Ackah** - (Darey - "Pray For Me"); Don Jazzy - (Korede Bello - "Somebody Great"); Cobhams Asuquo - (Bez - "You Suppose Know"); Rotimikeys - (Onos - "Have Your Way")	**WizzyPro** - (Patoranking - "Daniella Whine"); Tony Ross - (Cynthia Morgan - "German Juice"); Spellz - Burna Boy – "Check & Balance"); Shizzi - (Niyola - "Go On")
Best Afro Jazz Producer	Best Afro Gospel Producer
**Wole Oni** - (Wole Oni – "Cover Me Lord"); Femi Leye - (Femi Leye - "Smile"); Shola Emmanuel - (Shola Emmanuel - "Modupe"); Rotimikeys - (A Li'l While - "StephREDD")	**Wilson Joel**; Rotimikeys - (Onos - "Have Your Way"); Wilson Joel - (Onos - "Alagbara"); Phat-E; SMJ - (Tim Godfrey – "Amen Remix"); Florocka
New Discovery Dj	Best Dj
**DJ Enimoney**; DJ Mekzy; Ecool; DJ Hazan; DJ Baddo	**DJ Jimmy Jatt**; DJ Xclusive; DJ Spinall; DJ Jimmy Jatt; DJ Caise; DJ Humility
Best Female Dj Of The Year	Best Mixing & Mastering Engineer
**DJ Nana**; DJ Frizzi; DJ Cuppy; DJ Lambo; DJ Switch	**Zeeno Foster**; Olaitan Dada - (Laitan Dada - "SweetElele"); Indomix - (Reminisce - "Local Rappers"); Brain On The Mix - (Timaya - "Hallelujah"); Sheyman - (Kiss Daniel – "Laye"); Suka Sounds - (Wizkid - "Ojuelegba"); Vtek - (P-Square - "Shekini")
Best Radio Station	Best Entertainment Station (Terrestrial)
**Cool FM 96.9 - Lagos**; The Beat 99.9 FM; Rhythm 93.7 FM Lagos; Brilla 88.9 FM; Naija FM 102.7 FM; Rainbow FM; Radio Continental; 92.3 Inspiration FM; City 105.1 FM; Classic FM 97.3 Lagos; Wazobia FM 95.1 Lagos	**Silverbird Television**; Nigerian Television Authority; Africa Independent Television; Television Continental; Lagos Television
Best Entertainment Station (Cable)	Best Artist Manager
**HipTV**; Nigezie TV; Soundcity TV; RAVE TV; Kennis Music Channel	**Ubi Franklin** - Made Men Music Group; Peter Tega Oghenejobo – Mavin Records; Kamal Adeboye – HKN Music; Osagie Osarenkhoe – Skales, Reekado Banks; Abuchi Peter Ugwu – Chocolate City; Louiza Williams – Kiss Daniel; Taiye Aliyu – Yemi Alade; Soso Soberekon – Five Star Music; Alexander Okeke – YBNL Nation; Bisi Onadipe Davids – Sammie Okposo
Best Music Video Director	Best Live Band
**Clarence Peters**; Unlimited L.A; Sesan – (Davido - "The Sound"); Moe Musa – (Olamide - "Bobo"); Banky W. – (Banky W - "High Notes")	**Eboni Band**; Sharp Band; Shuuga Band; Veentage Band; Adrenaline Band
Best Event Promoter	Best OAP
**Cecil Hammond- Flytime Entertainment**; Matthew Ohio - El Carnaval; Femi Akande - Kilimanjaro Entertainment; Biola Adebajo - Evergreen Promotions; Kehinde Adegbite - Yankee Entertainment; Lanre Makun - Lanre Makun Events	**Do2tun**; Toolz; Yaw; Lolo; Tosyn Bucknor; Chico; Mazino Appeal, Sope Martins; OTB; Ushbebe
Best Record Company (Marketer)	Best Record Label
**Obaino Music**; Ahbu Ventures; Tjoe Productions; Uba Pacific; CN Media	**YBNL Nation**; Chocolate City; Mavin Records; Capital Hill; Starboy Entertainment; Hypertek Entertainment; Five Star Music
Best Blog	Best Online Music Platform
**Linda Ikeji Blog**; OloriSuperGal; YNaija; BellaNaija; Tiwa's Blog; Stella Dimoko Korkus; Nairaland; NG; 360nobs	**NotJustOk**; tooXclusive; 360nobs; Jaguda.com; Naijaloaded
Best Choreographer
**Kaffy**; Onome Iiovhogie; LOVET; GGB Dance Crew; Nonso Asobe; DNMT
Industry Professional Award Of The Year	Lifetime Achievement Award
**Kenny Ogungbe, Dayo Adeneye**	**Ben Murray-Bruce**
