= The Headies Award for Best Rap Album =

Nigerian music industry award

The Headies Award for Best Rap Album is an award presented at The Headies, a ceremony that was established in 2006 and originally called the Hip Hop World Awards. It was first presented to Mode 9 for his album Malcolm IX in 2006 .

== Recipients ==
Best Rap Album
Year	Nominees	Result
2019	Moral Instruction – Falz	Won
2019	Crown – AQ and Loose Kaynon	Nominated
2019	A Study on Self Worth: Yxng Dxnzl – M.I Abaga	Nominated
2019	Clone Wars, Vol. IV (These Buhari Times) – Show Dem Camp	Nominated
2018	27 – Falz	Nominated
2018	Trip to the South – Erigga	Nominated
2018	El-Hadj – Reminisce	Won
2018	The Playmaker – Phyno	Nominated
2018	The Glory – Olamide	Nominated
2018	Rose – A-Q	Nominated
2016	Eyan Mayweather – Olamide	Nominated
2016	Powerful – Illbliss	Won
2016	Stories That Touch – Falz	Nominated
2016	Y.A.G.I – Lil Kesh	Nominated
2015	Above Ground Level – Modenine	Nominated
2015	Baba Hafusa – Reminisce	Nominated
2015	Street OT – Olamide	Nominated
2015	The Chairman – M.I Abaga	Won
2014	No Guts No Glory – Phyno	Nominated
2014	Alaga Ibile – Reminisce	Nominated
2014	Baddest Guy Ever Liveth – Olamide	Won
2014	Thy Nation Come – Jesse Jagz	Nominated
2013	Oga Boss – Illbliss	Nominated
2013	The Second Coming – Vector	Nominated
2013	YBNL – Olamide	Won
2013	Book of Rap Stories – Reminisce	Nominated
2012	E.L.I – Ice Prince	Won
2012	The Dreamer Project – Show Dem Camp	Nominated
2012	Rapsodi – Olamide	Nominated
2012	Super C Season – Naeto C	Nominated
2011	MI 2: The Movie – M.I Abaga	Won
2011	Untouchable – Ruggedman	Nominated
2011	I Am William – 2Shotz	Nominated
2011	African American – Sauce Kid	Nominated
2011	Boys Are Not Smiling – Terry Tha Rapman	Nominated
2010	C.E.O – Da Grin	Won
2010	Dat Ibo Boy – Illbliss	Nominated
2010	More Than Rap Music – Cartiair	Nominated
2010	The Investment – Kel	Nominated
2009	Talk About It – M.I Abaga	Won
2009	Paradigm Shift – Mode 9	Nominated
2009	Second Turning by the Right – Lord of Ajasa	Nominated
2009	U Know My "P" – Naeto C	Nominated
2008	Ruggedy Baba – Ruggedman	Won
2008	Ibile – Lord of Ajasa	Nominated
2008	Gongo Aso – 9ice	Nominated
2008	Music Business – M.I Abaga	Nominated
2008	Naija 007 – Mode 9	Nominated
