= According to X =

Studio album by DJ Xclusive
- Released: 29 June 2015
- Genre: Afro-pop; hip-hop; EDM; Afrobeats
- Length: 83:17
- Label: EME; SDX
- Producer: DJ Xclusive; Altims; Del B; DJ Snoop; Don Jazzy; Masterkraft; Orbeat; Pheelz; Phyno; Sammy Gyang; Spellz; Studio Magic; Terry G; Tyrone; Vinnie

DJ Xclusive chronology
According to X (2015)	The XFiles (Session 1) (2020)

Singles from According to X
- 1. "No Time" Released: 20 February 2013; 2. "Pangolo" Released: 23 August 2013; 3. "Ibebe" Released: 3 December 2013; 4. "Gal Bad" Released: 25 March 2014; 5. "Fatasi" Released: 21 May 2014; 6. "Jeje" Released: 9 June 2014; 7. "Tonight" Released: 29 October 2014; 8. "Shaba" Released: 12 December 2014; 9. "Jam It" Released: 1 May 2015; 10. "Wo Le" Released: 30 June 2015

According to X is the debut studio album by British-Nigerian disc jockey and record producer DJ Xclusive. It was released 29 June 2015, through Empire Mates Entertainment and Superstar DJ Xclusive, and features guest appearances from Wizkid, Olamide, Davido, Phyno, Ice Prince, Tiwa Savage, Burna Boy, Timaya, 2Face Idibia, Patoranking, Banky W., Skales, Seyi Shay, Lil Kesh, CDQ, Niyola, Sarkodie, Cassper Nyovest, Ajebutter22, Trafic, May D, D'Prince, Fiesta Black, Reekado Banks, Kcee, Pepenazi, Terry G, Tillaman and a skit from comedian Bovi. Production was handled by Altims, Del B, Don Jazzy, Masterkraft, Orbeat, Pheelz, Phyno, Sammy Gyang, Spellz, Studio Magic, Terry G, Tyrone, Vinnie and Xclusive himself.

== Background and promotion ==
DJ Xclusive revealed the official album art and track list to the album on 25 June 2015.

To promote the album, he held the All White Party, which later ended up being an annual event hosted by Xclusive. It was held on 27 June 2015 at the Landmark Event Centre in Oniru, Lagos. Performances included of Olamide, Skales, 2Face Idibia, Iyanya, Patoranking, Banky W., Lil Kesh, and more.

== Singles ==
The album's lead single "No Time" featuring May D, Tillaman, and Skales was released on 20 February 2013. It serves as DJ Xclusive's official debut single and first official single under EME. It was produced by Tyrone and DJ Xclusive. The second single, "Pangolo", features Timaya and was released on 23 August 2013. It was produced by Masterkraft.

According to X's Pheelz-produced third single, "Ibebe", features Olamide and was released on 3 December 2013. The fourth single off the album, "Gal Bad" features D'Prince and Wizkid and was released on 25 March 2014. Don Jazzy and Altims produced the song. The fifth single, "Fantasi" features vocals and production from Terry G. It was released on 22 May 2014. The album's sixth single, "Jeje" featuring Wizkid was produced by Masterkraft. It was released on 9 June 2014 with an accompanying music video directed by Sesan. The seventh single off the album "Tonight" features label mates Banky W. and Niyola. Produced by Masterkraft, it was released on 29 October 2014. According to X's eighth single, "Shaba" featuring Kcee and Patoranking, was initially leaked on 7 December 2014. The Del B-produced single was eventually released as an official single on 12 December 2014, alongside its Adasa Cookey-directed video. The ninth single, "Jam It" featuring 2Face Idibia and Timaya, was released on 1 May 2015. Produced by Orbeat and DJ Xclusive, its release coincided with its music video which was directed by Cookey. The album's tenth and final single "Wo Le" featuring Davido was released on 30 June 2015 and was produced by Spellz.

== Critical reception ==
Joey Akan of Pulse Nigeria described According to X as "all firepower and no deep hit", highlighting its star-studded lineup and focus on dance tracks but critiquing its lack of lyrical depth and variety. While tracks like "Cash Only" stood out, the 21-track album was ultimately called "a long and increasingly boring dance journey", earning a rating of 3/5 for being "worth checking out".

== Track listing ==
According to X track listing
No.	Title	Writer(s)	Producer(s)	Length
1.	"You Sabi Xclusive?" (featuring Bovi)		—	0:53
2.	"All I See Is Me" (featuring Phyno)	Rotimi Alakija; Chibuzor Azubuike	Phyno	3:51
3.	"Rassa" (featuring Fiesta Black)	Alakija; Thandi Mokgoankgoa	Vinnie	4:17
4.	"Jam It" (featuring 2Face Idibia and Timaya)	Alakija; Innocent Idibia; Inetimi Odon	Orbeat	3:16
5.	"Tonight" (featuring Banky W. and Niyola)	Alakija; Olubankole Wellington; Eniola Akinbo	Masterkraft	3:51
6.	"Gal Bad" (featuring D'Prince and Wizkid)	Alakija; Charles Enebeli; Ayodeji Ibrahim Balogun	Don Jazzy; Altims	3:56
7.	"Wo Le" (featuring Davido)	Alakija; David Adeleke	Spellz	3:39
8.	"Shaba" (featuring Kcee and Patoranking)	Alakija; Kingsley Okonkwo; Patrick Okorie	Del B	3:39
9.	"Alhaji" (featuring Tiwa Savage, Trafic, and Reekado Banks)	Alakija; Tiwatope Savage; Philip Okafor; Ayoleyi Solomon	Spellz	3:40
10.	"Ibebe" (featuring Olamide)	Alakija; Olamide Adedeji	Pheelz	2:35
11.	"Oyoyo" (featuring Burna Boy)	Alakija; Damini Ogulu	Spellz	3:26
12.	"Party Tonight" (featuring Ajebutter22 and Seyi Shay)	Alakija; Akitoye Balogun; Deborah Joshua	Studio Magic	3:10
13.	"Pangolo" (featuring Timaya)	Alakija; Odon	Masterkraft	3:53
14.	"Gone Are the Days" (featuring Olamide and Pepenazi)	Alakija; Adedeji; Opeyemi Kayode	Pheelz	3:21
15.	"Jeje" (featuring Wizkid)	Alakija; A.I. Balogun	Masterkraft	3:56
16.	"Cash Only" (featuring Sarkodie and Cassper Nyovest)	Alakija; Michael Addo; Refiloe Phoolo	Masterkraft	3:22
17.	"Fatasi" (featuring Terry G)	Alakija; Gabriel Amanyi	Terry G	3:42
18.	"Dami Si" (featuring Lil Kesh and CDQ)	Alakija; Keshinro Ololade; Sodiq Yusuf	Masterkraft	3:33
19.	"Cash Only" (remix; featuring Sarkodie, Cassper Nyovest, and Banky W.)	Alakija; Addo; Phoolo; Wellington	Masterkraft	4:35
20.	"No Time" (featuring May D, Tillaman, and Skales)	Alakija; Akinmayokun Awodumila; Adeyemi Adetona; Raoul John Njeng-Njeng	Tyrone; DJ Xclusive	4:49
21.	"Promise" (featuring Ice Prince)	Alakija; Panshak Zamani	Sammy Gyang	4:30

iTunes bonus tracks
No.	Title	Writer(s)	Producer(s)	Length
22.	"Jam It (DJ Snoop Remix)" (featuring 2Face Idibia and Timaya)	Alakija; Idibia; Odon	DJ Snoop	3:29
23.	"Tonight (House Remix)" (featuring Banky W., Niyola, and Tyrone)	Alakija; Wellington; Akinbo	Tyrone	3:47
Total length:				83:17

Notes

- "—" denotes a skit

== Release history ==
Release history and formats for According to X
Region	Date	Format	Label
Worldwide	29 June 2015	CD	EME
Worldwide	21 September 2015	Digital download	EME
