= Local Rappers =

Single by Reminisce featuring Olamide anf Phyno

from the album Baba Hafusa
- Released: 21 January 2015
- Recorded: 15 January 2015
- Genre: Hip-hop; gangsta rap
- Length: 3:28
- Label: Edge
- Songwriters: Remilekun Safaru; Olamide Adedeji; Chibuzor Azubuike
- Producer: Tyrone

Reminisce singles chronology
| "Skilashi" (2014) | "Local Rappers" (2015) | "Baba Hafusa" (2015) |

Olamide singles chronology
| "Son of Abraham" (2015) | "Local Rappers" (2015) | "Indomie (Remix)" (2015) |

Phyno singles chronology
| "Taking Over Me" (2015) | "Local Rappers" (2015) | "Une" (2015) |

Music video
- "Local Rappers" on YouTube

"Local Rappers" is a song by Nigerian rapper Reminisce featuring Olamide and Phyno. It was released by Edge Records as the second single from his third studio album Baba Hafusa on 21 January 2015. Produced by Tyrone, the release of "Local Rappers" was met with different opinions among music critics, with some commending the artists for rapping in their local dialects, while others perceived the song to be a diss track against rappers in Nigeria who rapped in English.

== Background ==
On 15 January 2015, NotJustOk reported that Reminisce recorded "Local Rappers" with Olamide and Phyno. The report stated that the song was intended as the second single from his third studio album Baba Hafusa. The song was released six days later, on 21 January 2015.

== Music video ==
The Mex-directed music video for "Local Rappers" arrived on 8 May 2015 and was met with critical acclaim. tooXclusive's Jim Donnett said the video "fortifies" the song with "tasteful" scenery and camera angles, showing the streets "in their true, real and natural forms." He noted that the rappers "donned their signature looks" and praised the moderation in props and absence of choreography, stating it "does a lot to compliment." He concluded, "I love the video and I don’t think it could have been any better executed," and rated it 4.

Henry Igwe of 360nobs said Mex was "a proper master of the visuals," praising the "great street imagery" and how the video "brings the streets on screen like it is," though he noted "wardrobe irregularities" and "total inattention to details on the part of the production crew." He highlighted moments like "a guy clad in black suit…drops his case to brush the dust off a young man’s sneakers" and the "aerial camera view mirrors the Lagos metropolis pleasantly." He concluded that it was a "massive joint" and that Reminisce "scores some more points for this."

== Critical reception ==
Arinze Obikili, a writer for Jaguda, stated that the song had a "solid A+" concept, and the "production, beat and use of that sample by Tyrone is dope," with a "melody and vibe...just as nice." He noted that the "verses from all 3 rappers…left much to be desired," though "Reminisce held it down the most." He concluded that it is "a song that will live in memory for the concept, and the dope beat" and gave it a rating of 3.0. In a review for tooXclusive, Jim Donnett praised the song as a "beautifully crafted masterpiece" and said the "synergy of their trio totally smoked up this joint," giving it a rating of 4.5. Jimmy King called it "just too dope from the beginning to the end" with "mad flows everywhere" and described it as "the song of the year," rating it 4.0. Al Yhusuff highlighted Reminisce's versatility and the featured artistes' performances, stating they "step up their game on a well laced hip hop beat," and rated it 4.5.

== Controversy ==
It was reported in the media that Mode 9 was unimpressed with Reminisce over some lines in the lyrics of the song. Mode 9 went on to deny such reports as "untrue".

=== Accolades ===
| Year | Award ceremony | Prize | Result | Ref |
|---|---|---|---|---|
| 2015 | The Headies | Best Collaboration | Won | |
| 2015 | The Headies | Best Rap Single | Nominated | |
| 2015 | tooXclusive Awards | Best Hip-Hop Track | Won | |
| 2015 | Nigerian Music Video Awards | Mainstream Hip Hop Video | Nominated | |
| 2015 | The Beatz Awards | Best Mixing & Mastering Engineer (NDU Mix for "Local Rappers") | Nominated | |
