= Tyrone (producer) =

Nigerian record producer

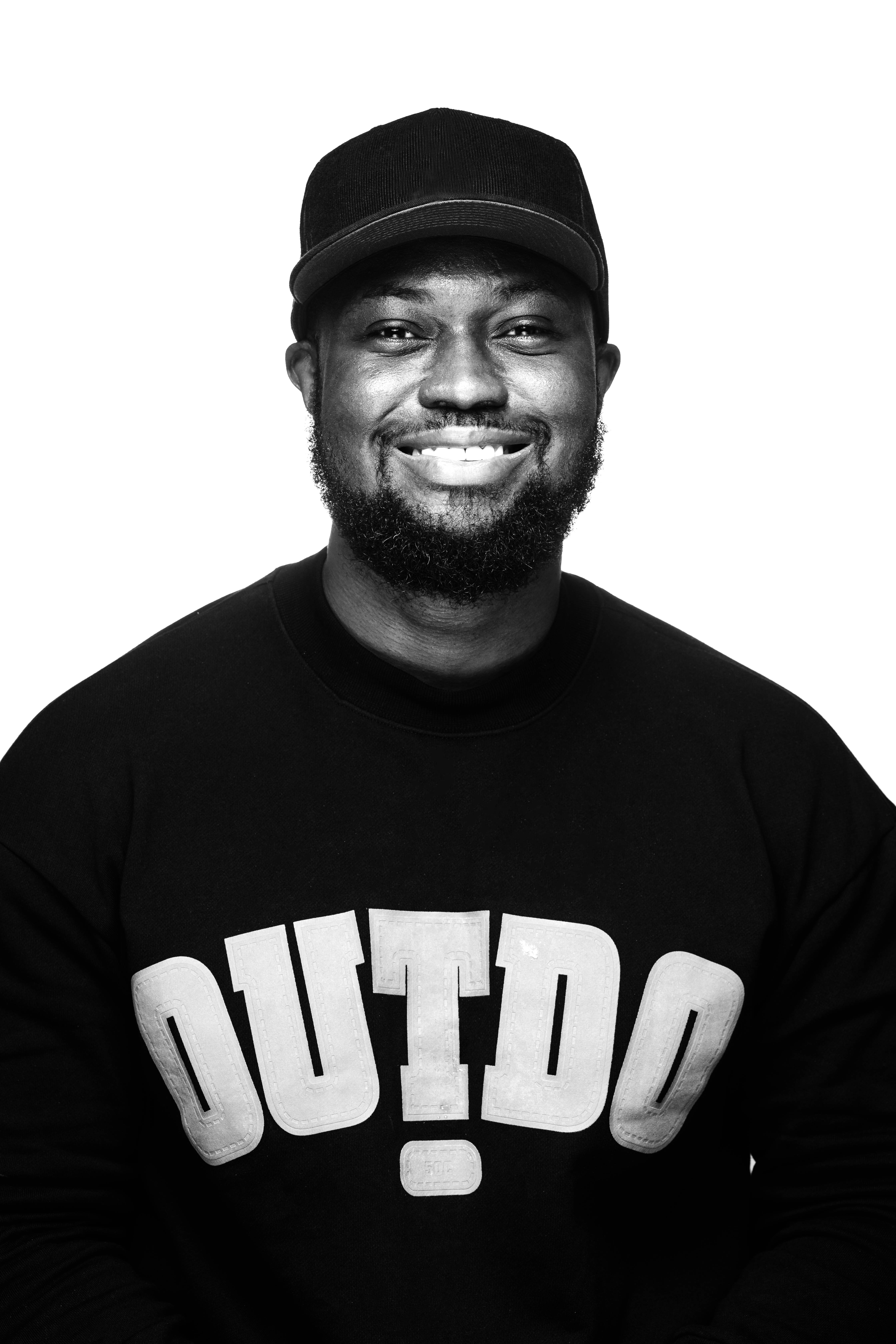
- This is an Image of Triumph Grandeur

Background information
- Born: Triumph Grandeur; Delta State, Nigeria
- Occupation: Record producer

Triumph Grandeur (known professionally as Tyrone, born 1 August is a Nigerian record producer.

His love for music started at age 9 when he learned to play various musical instruments such as drums, piano, and guitar. He grew to become a music producer in Nigeria, producing popular tracks like Olamide's multi-award-winning ‘Voice of the Street’ in his 2012 YBNL Album; Reminisce’ Baba Hafusa, Grind and award-winning ‘Local Rappers’ which featured Olamide & Phyno. He has worked with other Nigerian artists including 2Baba, Ruggedman, Wande Coal, M.I Abaga, Vector, May D, Brymo, Solidstar, D'Prince, DJ Xclusive, Shank, Tillaman, Skales, Taiwon, Del City, Eben, and Jahdiel.

He's also one Nigeria's radio personalities currently working as the corporate brand manager and group head of Production in CoolFM, Wazobia FM & Nigeria Info and most recently Arewa radio. He is the sound coordinator for Wazobia TV and Wazobia Max.

He has trained artists in voice-overs, singing, and production.

== Early life ==
Tyrone was born in Delta State, Nigeria and spent his early life there before moving with his parents to Lagos. He attended the University of Lagos and obtained a BSc in microbiology. He started his career in production as a student of Unilag where he joined a music group, Rock Solid, and was an active member with the likes of Nollywood actor, OC Ukeje and singer J’odie (Kuchi Kuchi) amongst other members- this same group which produced KUSH, one of Nigeria's R&B/contemporary bands at the time. He later became HOD of the group.

== Career ==
Music production

At the earliest part of his music career, he co-founded a record label, Beatmap, with John Black with member Artists Zeal, Goldie and DelCity. Tyrone officially pulled out of the record label a few years later to pursue his personal career.

In 2015, he produced Reminisce’ ‘Local Rappers’ that featured Olamide & Phyno. This track won ‘Best Hip-Hop Track in the TooXclusive Awards 2015. He produced 2 other tracks, ‘Baba Hafusa’ and ‘Grind’ on Reminisce’ third album, Baba Hafusa, an album that sold over 500,000 copies in Nigeria in 2 weeks. This album is one of the most successful hip-hop albums in Nigeria.

He was one of the producers of Olamide's YBNL Album (4)(5) that won Best Rap Album of the Year and Album of the Year in The Headies 2013, and also won Best Album of the Year in the 2013 Nigeria Entertainment Awards (13) (11). In this Album, Tyrone personally produced ‘Voice of the Streets’. This track was nominated Lyricist on the Roll in The Headies 2013 and Music Video of the Year in the 2013 Nigerian Entertainment Awards (11).

Tyrone produced DJ Xclusive's Kontrol remix (17) featuring W4, Ara remix featuring Brymo and No Time’ in the Album According to X which featured May D, Tillaman, and Skales.

Tyrone was one of the producers of Goldie's 2012 Album, ‘Gold Reloaded’ (9); Ruggedman's ‘Untouchable’ Album released in 2010; Vector's album, ‘The Second Coming’

Other music artists Tyrone has produced for include DelCity(15), MBryo(16), Pepenazi, Bebe Sumtin, popular gospel Artists, Eben and Jahdiel.

Movie post-production

Taste of Love (2015): Tyrone produced the official soundtrack and handled the scoring/post production of this movie series, Taste of Love, which was Nigeria's first indigenous telenovela.

‘Royal Castle’ (2015): The movie scoring and production of the official soundtrack was done by Tyrone.

‘Heavens Hell’: The movie scoring and sound production was done by Tyrone. He produced the radio trailers and promotions for this movie

He also produced radio trailers and promotions for the following movies: ‘Inale’, ‘Last Flight to Abuja', ‘Mirror Boy’ and others.

Radio and entertainment

Tyrone has worked with different radio stations including Cool FM, Wazobia FM, Nigeria Info, Nigezie. In 2013, he worked with the CEO Kwame in re-branding the sound of Nigezie by creating new imaging materials.

He produced a number of radio programs including a whole season of ‘The Pepsi Chart Show’, in 2012 for Cecil Hammond which aired on major radio stations in Nigeria; ‘Nigeria Manifesto’: He produced this program working with Nicolas Okoye (CEO Anabel Group, former Dep Gen Manager, Nigerian Stock Exchange); ‘The Business’: a weekly magazine program.

He is also a creative writer and produces numerous radio jingles in Nigeria (12); He handles sound branding, sound coordination and imaging for radio and TV Stations. He handled the station imaging for Cool FM which won them the ‘Radio Channel with Best Station Imaging’ in the Nigerian Broadcasters Merit Awards 2014 (14).

== Music production controversy ==
In 2014, news sources reported that the beat for Olamide's biggest hit, Durosoke, was originally produced by Tyrone but he was not credited for co-production because the artist's frequent music collaborator, Pheelz allegedly re-modelled the beat and took full credit for the song production (7). However, Tyrone and the Artist, Olamide have long moved past the issue as they still work closely together.

Tyrone has sometimes missed out on getting credits from the Music Industry for songs he produced. NotJustOk.com, one of Nigeria's known online music sites reviewed Reminisce’ Baba Hafusa album, listing other producers but omitting Tyrone's name even though he had produced three notable songs on the same album, but giving the production credits to other producers(18).

== Discography ==
Songs produced	Artist	Album	Song awards
Voice of the Street	Olamide	YBNL	"Best Album of the Year" – 2013 Nigeria Entertainment Awards
			"Album of the Year" – The Headies 2013
			"Best Rap Album" – The Headies 2013
			Nominee, Lyricist on the Roll – The Headies 2013
Baba Hafusa	Reminisce	Baba Hafusa	
Grind	Reminisce	Baba Hafusa	
Local Rapper	Reminisce, ft. Olamide & Phyno	Baba Hafusa	"Best Hip-Hop Track" TooXclusive Awards 2015
Kontrol Remix (ft. W4)	DJ Xclusive	Single	
Ara Remix (ft. Brymo)	DJ Xclusive	Single	
No Time	DJ Xclusive, May-D, Tillaman & Skales	According to X	
Agidi	Rugged Man (ft. Wande-Cole)	Single	
Because of You	Rugged Man, MI & TuFace	Single	
Seyi Shay	Rugged Man & Olamide		
Halla	Rugged Man		
DJ Pump it up	Rugged Man		
E No Easy to popular	Rugged Man		
Jawo Jawo Remix	Goldee and Jaywon	Single	
Rora	Vector and Shamk	Single	
Halleluyah	Solid Star	Single	
E Must to be	D'Prince	Single	
