= Tolulope =

- Gender: Unisex
- Language: Yoruba

Origin
- Origin: Nigeria
- Meaning: To God be the glory
- Region of origin: South western Nigeria

Other names
- Related names: Toluwalope

Listen

Tolúlọpẹ́ is a Unisex Nigerian given name of Yoruba origin meaning "To God be the Glory/Thanks/Gratitude"' It is a diminutive form of Tolúwalọpẹ́.

Notable people with the name include:

- Tolulope "Jordan" Omogbehin, American wrestler
- Tolulope Ogunlesi, Nigerian journalist
- Tolulope Adesina, Nigerian musician
- Toluwalope Akinyemi, Nigerian writer
- Tolulope Odebiyi, Nigerian politician
- Folasade Tolulope Ogunsola Nigerian academic
- Adesua Tolulope Etomi-Wellington, Nigerian actress
- Tolulope Arotile (1995–2020), Nigerian Air Force helicopter pilot
- Tolulope Popoola, Nigerian author
