= ATSG, Vol. 1 =

Studio album by Reminisce
- Released: 27 October 2023
- Recorded: 2023
- Genre: Afrobeats
- Length: 35:04
- Label: LRR
- Producer: Teekaz; Pimpzbeatz; Eskeez; Sarz; Quebeat; Phantom; Niphkeys; Goldswarm; Rhookchastle; Jomaine; F3tickxx; Fiokee

Reminisce chronology
Vibes & Insha Allah (2020)	ATSG, Vol. 1 (2023)	Sui Generis (2024)

Singles from ATSG, Vol. 1
- 1. "Hustle" Released: 23 February 2022; 2. "Shina Peters" Released: 31 May 2023; 3. "Why?" Released: 18 August 2023

ATSG, Vol. 1 (an acronym for Alaye Toh Se Gogo, Volume 1) is the fifth studio album by Nigerian rapper Reminisce. The album was released on 27 October 2023 by LRR Entertainment and features guest appearances from Dremo, Mayorkun, MohBad, Olamide, D Smoke, Odumodublvck, Bnxn, Ycee, Oxlade, Rhookcastle, Powpeezy, and Kayode. Reminisce enlisted producers such as Sarz, Eskeez, Quebeat, Fiokee, Teekaz, Pimpzbeatz, Rhookcastle, Goldswarm, F3tickxx, Phantom, Niphkeys, and Jomaine. The album is a follow-up to his 2020 EP, Vibes & Insha Allah (2020), and is his first full-length studio album in seven years since El-Hadj (2016).

== Background ==
Reminisce first announced the album to be released in August 2021 on Instagram, titled the full title, "Alaye Toh Se Gogo". He revealed a proposed tracklist for the album on 13 March 2023. Most of the tracks from the initial tracklist were ultimately included on the album, however, tracks like "Different Story", "Backshots", "Resurrection (Ijinde)" and "Lighter" were taken off. "Run Away" was renamed to "Why?". Following several months of delay in the album's release, Reminisce finally revealed the tracklist on the 25th of October, and the album finally released on October 27th, with the title being changed to ATSG, Vol. 1.

== Singles ==
The album housed three singles. The album's lead single "Hustle" features Bnxn and D Smoke and was released on 23 February 2022 and was produced by Sarz. The second single, "Shina Peters" was released on 31 May 2023 and features the late MohBad, produced by Niphkeys. The third single off ATSG, "Why?" features Oxlade was released on 18 August 2023 and produced by Rhookcastle.

== Critical reception ==
Tomide Marv of Zikoko! described ATSG, Vol. 1 as a "solid body of work" with "cohesive production and stellar performance", praising Reminisce's versatility and ability to remain creatively sharp after years away from album releases. He highlighted the tracks "Eyes", "Mora", and "E.N.K.R", concluding that the album "solidif[ied] his superstardom and street legend" and that "Reminisce got it".

Adeayo Adebiyi of Pulse Nigeria called ATSG, Vol. 1 as a "well-executed album" that showcased the "different pieces" of Reminisce's artistry while balancing "diversity without losing its purpose". He commended the collaborations, production, and sequencing for providing "an enjoyable listening experience with no part of the album feeling flat", concluding that "Reminisce shows the veterans how to make an album on their terms while still crafting music the mainstream can enjoy". He gave the album a 7.9/10.

=== Accolades ===
Year	Awards ceremony	Award description(s)	Results
2025	The Headies	Best Rap Album	Nominated

== Track listing ==
ATSG, Vol. 1 track listing
No.	Title	Writer(s)	Producer(s)	Length
1.	"Eyes" (featuring Mayorkun)	Remilekun Safaru; Adewale Emmanuel	Teekaz	3:31
2.	"Awon Aye"	Safaru	Pimpzbeatz	2:52
3.	"Orin" (featuring Olamide)	Safaru; Olamide Adedeji	Eskeez	3:14
4.	"Hustle" (featuring Bnxn and D Smoke)	Safaru; Daniel Benson; Daniel Farris	Sarz	3:09
5.	"Recycle"	Safaru	Quebeat	1:29
6.	"E.N.K.R" (featuring Ycee and Rhookcastle)	Safaru; Oludemilade Alejo; Adegbite Ademola	Phantom	2:58
7.	"Shina Peters" (featuring MohBad)	Safaru; Ilerioluwa Aloba	Niphkeys	2:46
8.	"Rotate" (interlude)	Safaru	Quebeat	1:12
9.	"Olu Maintain" (featuring Odumodublvck, Dremo and Powpeezy)	Safaru; Tochukwu Ojogwu; Aboriomoh Raymond; Adeniran Martins	Goldswarm	2:35
10.	"Why?" (featuring Oxlade)	Safaru; Ikuforiji Abdulrahman	Rhookcastle	3:04
11.	"Mora"	Safaru	Jomaine	2:46
12.	"Tight" (featuring Kayode)	Safaru; Oluwakayode Oyetoro	F3tickxx	2:39
13.	"Mora" (acoustic version)	Safaru	Fiokee	2:46
Total length:				35:04

== Personnel ==
- Remilekun "Reminisce" Safaru – vocals, writing, executive production
- Adewale "Mayorkun" Emmanuel – vocals, writing
- Olamide Adedeji – vocals, writing
- Daniel "Bnxn" Benson – vocals, writing
- Daniel "D Smoke" Farris – vocals, writing
- Oludemilade "Ycee" Alejo – vocals, writing
- Adeniran "Powpeezy" Martins – vocals, writing
- Ilerioluwa "MohBad" Aloba – vocals, writing
- Tochukwu "Odumodublvck" Ojogwu – vocals, writing
- Aboriomoh "Dremo" Raymond – vocals, writing
- Ikuforiji "Oxlade" Abdulrahman – vocals, writing
- Oluwakayode "Kayode" Oyetoro – vocals, writing
- Adegbite "Rhookcastle" Ademola – vocals, writing, production
- Teekaz – production
- Pimpzbeatz – production
- Adenola "Eskeez" Gabriel – production
- Osabuohien "Sarz" Osaretin – production
- Oladipupo "Quebeat" Olugbemi – production
- Ayobami "Phantom" Olaleye – production
- Adebajo "Niphkeys" Adebanjo – production
- Goldswarm – production
- Jomaine – production
- F3tickxx – production
- Ifiok "Fiokee" Effanga – production
- Victor "Vtek" Kpoudosu – mixing, mastering
- Badmantej – photography
- Dunsin Bankole – art direction

== Release history ==
Release history and formats for ATSG Vol. 1
Region	Date	Format	Label
Various	27 October 2023	Streaming; digital download	LRR
