= DJ Jimmy Jatt =

Musical artist and disc jockey

Jimmy Jatt Amu
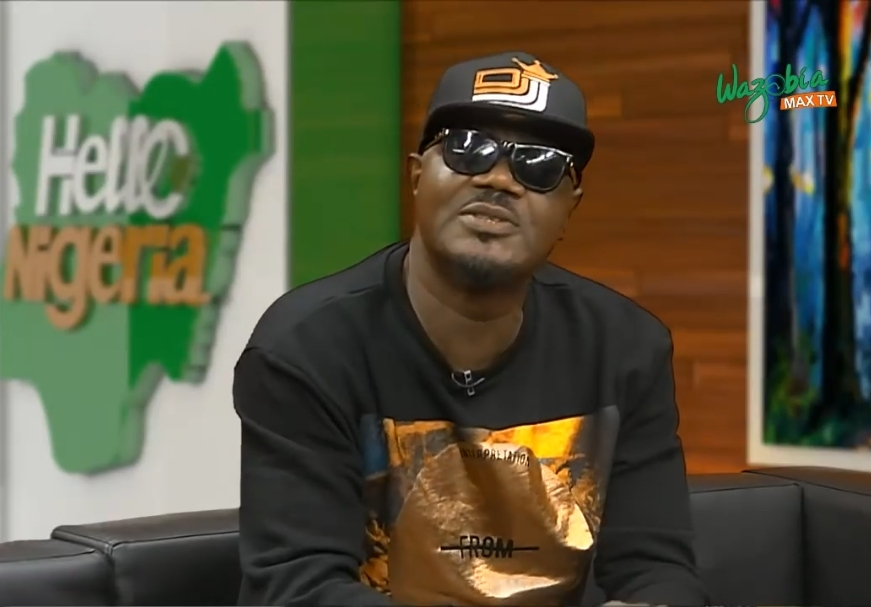

Background information
- Born: Oluwaforijimi Adewale Amu; October 15, 1966 (age 59); Lagos Island, Lagos State, Nigeria
- Genres: Afrobeats, Hip hop
- Instrument: turntables
- Years active: 1984–present
- Website: djjimmyjatt.com

Jimmy Jatt Amu (born Oluwaforijimi Adewale Amu on October 15, 1966), known professionally as DJ Jimmy Jatt, is a Nigerian disc jockey who is revered as one of the pioneering Afrobeats hip hop DJs in Nigeria. He started out his music career as a rapper under the sobriquet Master J but delved into DJing after his failure in getting signed by a record label despite releasing a handful of songs including a demo recording. He is best known for his Jimmy's Jump Off concert, an event he started in 2008 to become one of the most attended entertainment events in Nigeria. In 2006, he won the Hip Hop World Hall of Fame award at the maiden edition of The Headies for his contribution to hip-hop in Nigeria.

== Early life and career ==
Jimmy Amu is a native of Ijebu Ode, Ogun State, but he was born and bred in Lagos Island, Lagos State, Nigeria where he had his basic and secondary education. Born to a father who was a sound equipment dealer, Jimmy Jatt developed interest in music at an early age. He grew up listening to various genres of music including pop, afrojuju, highlife, afrobeat, jazz, hip-hop, rhythm and blues and soul. He began his career as a rapper under the stage name Master J. However, he had to switch into DJing after he failed to secure a record label contract upon releasing several songs and demos. He soon became popular as a DJ for hosting a street carnival called "Road Block", an event which involved lyrical rap battles between upcoming and underground rappers. In 2007, he released a mixtape titled The Definition, a compilation of songs which features several Nigerian artistes including Sound Sultan, 2Baba, Mode 9, Naeto C, 9ice, Ruggedman, eLDee, M.I among others. The mixtape included "Stylee", a song which features vocals from 2Baba, Mode 9 and ElaJoe and went on to be nominated in two categories at the 2007 edition of the Channel O Music Video Awards. With a T.V. programme called Jimmy's Jump Off, several collaborations, awards and nominations and endorsement deals; DJ Jimmy Jatt is highly recognised and revered for pushing hip-hop in Nigeria.

== Discography ==
=== Studio albums ===
- The Definition (2007)
- The Industry Vol 1 (2014)
- Urban Heartbeat (2017)
