= Baba Hafusa =

Studio album by Reminisce
- Released: April 30, 2015
- Recorded: 2014–2015
- Genre: Hip hop, rap, afrobeat
- Language: English; Yoruba; Igbo
- Label: Edge; LRR
- Producer: Shizzi; Sarz; Young Jonn; Jospo; Tyrone; Sossick; Chopstix; KimzBeatz; D'Tunes

Reminisce chronology
Alaga Ibile (2013)	Baba Hafusa (2015)	El-Hadj (2016)

Singles from Baba Hafusa
- 1. "Tesojue" Released: August 20, 2014; 2. "Local Rappers" Released: January 22, 2015; 3. "Skilashii" Released: April 16, 2015

Professional ratings
Review scores
Source	Rating
NotJustOk	5.5/10
tooXclusive	3/5 stars

Baba Hafusa is the third studio album by Nigerian rap act Reminisce which was released through EDGE Records and LRR Entertainment on 30 April 2015. It is the rapper's third overall studio album after releasing Book of Rap Stories in 2012 and Alaga Ibile in 2013. The studio album which features guest appearances from SoJay, Vector, Ice Prince, Olamide, Phyno, Sossick and Sean Tizzle was according to Reminisce a way of paying tribute to his daughter named Hafusa.

== Critical reception ==
Upon its release, Baba Hafusa was received with mixed reviews and opinions. Awarding the album four stars from tooXclusive, Ogaga Sakpaide states, ““Baba Hafusa” sees Reminisce in his comfort zone from a lyrical and production view.” Tola Sarumi of notJustOk rated the album 5.5 out of 10 stating that, “even as a commercial album, Baba Hafusa doesn’t do enough to hold your attention.” 360nobs's Henry Igwe described Baba Hafusa as "a lengthy, filmic display of Rap-Afro Pop fusions" that, while commercially appealing and daring in its genre-bursting approach, is ultimately "lazy" with repetitive themes centered on lewd content and lacking deeper, impactful storytelling.

=== Accolades ===
Year	Award ceremony	Award description	Result
2015	Nigeria Entertainment Awards	Album of the Year	Nominated
2015	The Headies	Best Rap Album	Nominated

== Commercial performance ==
On 18 May 2015, Baba Hafusa rose to 12th position on the Billboard World Music Albums Charts after topping the iTunes album sales for over a week less than 24-hours after its release.

== Track listing ==
No.	Title	Producer(s)	Length
1.	"Grind" (featuring SoJay)	Tyrone	2:52
2.	"Baba Hafusa"	Tyrone	2:30
3.	"Saida"	Kimzbeatz	3:17
4.	"Skilashi" (featuring SoJay)	Sarz	4:03
5.	"Gbamilago" (featuring Sean Tizzle)	D'Tunes	3:43
6.	"I Need A Girl"	Jospo	3:01
7.	"Omologe"	Jospo	3:36
8.	"Local Rappers" (featuring Olamide & Phyno)	Tyrone	5:08
9.	"Tesojue"	Jospo	2:41
10.	"Alagbara" (featuring SoJay)	Sossick	4:26
11.	"Otiya"	Sarz	3:39
12.	"Kososhi" (featuring Sossick)	Chopstix	3:16
13.	"Busayo" (featuring Ice Prince)	Young John	3:34
14.	"Nothing" (featuring Vector & SoJay)	Sarz	3:56
15.	"Outro"	Camo Blaizz	2:02

Bonus track
No.	Title	Length
16.	"Let It Be Known"	2:30

== Release history ==
Country/Digital platform	Date	Version	Format	Label
iTunes; Nigeria	April 30, 2015	Standard	CD; digital download	EDGE Records; LRR
