= Book of Rap Stories =

Studio album by Reminisce
- Released: 31 March 2012
- Recorded: 2010–2012
- Studio: Edge Recording Studio (Lagos)
- Genre: Afrobeats; hip-hop; fuji
- Length: 45:08
- Label: Edge; LRR
- Producer: Sarz; Legendury Beatz; D'Tunes; Jospo; Joshbeatz; Pastor Child; Akymz

Reminisce chronology
Book of Rap Stories (2012)	Alaga Ibile (2013)

Singles from Book of Rap Stories
- 1. "Ever Since" Released: 20 July 2010; 2. "Kako Bi Chicken" Released: 31 May 2011; 3. "2Mussh" Released: 19 February 2012; 4. "If Only" Released: 19 February 2012

Book of Rap Stories is the debut studio album by Nigerian rapper Reminisce. It was released for physical release on 31 March 2012 and for digital release on 28 July 2012. The album features guest appearances from 9ice, Dagrin, Ruggedman, Patoranking, Jahbless, XP, Minjin, and Jospo. Its production was handled by Sarz, Legendury Beatz, D'Tunes, Jospo, Joshbeatz, Pastor Child, and Akymz. The album was released following Reminisce's transition from English-language rap to indigenous rap and contributed to his rise to wider recognition.

Musically, it blends hip-hop, Afrobeats, fuji, and street-oriented influences. Book of Rap Stories was supported by the singles "Ever Since", "Kako Bi Chicken", "2Mussh", and "If Only". Upon release, Book of Rap Stories received generally positive reviews from music critics, who praised its production and Reminisce's lyricism and wordplay. The album was nominated for Best Rap Album at the 8th Headies Awards.

== Background ==
Prior to the release of Book of Rap Stories, Reminisce had recorded an English-language album of the same name in 2003 with producer ID Cabasa, although it was never released due to a lack of commercial success. He subsequently stepped away from music and operated a shoe and clothing business in Yaba, Lagos. He returned to making music professionally after featuring on "Bachelor's Life", the eighth track from Nigerian singer 9ice's second studio album Gongo Aso (2008).

Following his return to music, Reminisce began working with producer Sarz and released the single "One Chance" featuring Jahbless and Alash in 2008. Although the song received radio airplay, it was not a commercial breakthrough. He later moved towards indigenous rap and street music after his Yoruba-language performance on the remix of Jahbless' "Joor Oh" attracted attention. The attention from his performance led him to begin working on Book of Rap Stories.

== Singles ==
The 9ice-assisted "Ever Since" was released on 20 July 2010 as the album's lead single; the song was produced by Sarz. The album's second single, "Kako Bi Chicken" was released on 31 May 2011; it went on to become his breakthrough single. Also produced by Sarz, the song blends rap, fuji and electro music. Its instrumental had previously been rejected by several rappers, including Naeto C.

On 19 February 2012, Reminisce released the singles "2Mussh" and "If Only", which serve as the album's third and fourth singles respectively. "2Mussh" was produced by Legendury Beatz and "If Only" was produced by D'Tunes. In an interview with Ogaga Sakpaide of tooXclusive, Reminisce said that he recorded the song within ten minutes. A remix of "2Mussh" featuring Nigerian rappers Sauce Kid and Ice Prince was released in November 2012. "If Only" was originally released in July 2010 in conjunction with "Ever Since" before being redone for Book of Rap Stories.

=== Other releases ===
On 14 September 2009, Reminisce released the promotional singles "Gbabe", featuring Dagrin and XP, and "Caro". Both tracks were produced by Sarz. "Gbon Gbon" featuring Ruggedman and Minjin was released as a promotional single on 26 June 2012. The Akymz-produced "Jemi" featuring Jahbless was released as a promotional single on 25 June 2013.

== Critical reception ==
A reviewer for 360nobs, who goes by the moniker Shadenonconformist, described Book of Rap Stories as a "commendable effort", praising the album's production and Reminisce's "creative wordplay". With a rating of 5.9 out of 10, she concluded that Book of Rap Stories is "Reminisce's definitive declaration that he is not going anywhere soon."

=== Accolades ===
Book of Rap Stories received a nomination for Best Rap Album at the 8th edition of The Headies.

== Track listing ==
Book of Rap Stories track listing
No.	Title	Writer(s)	Producer(s)	Length
1.	"Intro by Tatoo"	Remilekun Safaru	—	1:09
2.	"Quality"	Safaru	Sarz	3:33
3.	"Ever Since" (featuring 9ice)	Safaru; Abolore Akande	Sarz	4:21
4.	"2Mussh"	Safaru	Legendury Beatz	3:35
5.	"If Only"	Safaru	D'Tunes	3:11
6.	"Gbabe" (featuring Dagrin and XP)	Safaru; Oladapo Olaonipekun; Olumide Okelola	Sarz	3:29
7.	"Gbon Gbon" (featuring Ruggedman and Minjin)	Safaru; Michael Stephens; Adewale Lawanson Jr.	Joshbeatz	4:07
8.	"Bisi My Lover"	Safaru	Pastor Child	3:23
9.	"Tinkin" (featuring Patoranking)	Safaru; Patrick Okorie	Sarz	3:33
10.	"Kako Bi Chicken"	Safaru	Sarz	3:44
11.	"Jemi" (featuring Jahbless)	Safaru; Olatunde Olumoroti	Akymz	3:24
12.	"Caro"	Safaru	Sarz	3:51
13.	"Bye Bye" (featuring Jospo)	Safaru; Joseph Akinsanya	Jospo	3:41
Total length:				45:08

== Personnel ==
Credits adapted from back cover.

- Sarz – production (2, 3, 6, 9, 10, 12)
- Legendury Beatz – production (4)
- D'Tunes – production (5)
- Joshbeatz – production (7)
- Pastor Child – production (8)
- Akymz – production (11)
- Jospo – production (13)
- Indomix – mixing, mastering (4, 5, 6, 7, 8, 9, 11, 12, 13)
- Sheyman – mixing, mastering (2, 3, 10)

== Release history ==
Release history and formats for Book of Rap Stories
Region	Date	Format	Label
Nigeria	31 March 2012	CD	Edge; LRR
Various	28 July 2012	Digital download	Edge; LRR
