= El-Hadj =

Studio album by Reminisce
- Released: 29 August 2016
- Length: 56:50
- Label: LRR
- Producer: Sarz; Sossick; Jomane; Pbankz; TSpize; Tyce; Camo Blaizz; TMXO

Reminisce chronology
Baba Hafusa (2015)	El-Hadj (2016)	Vibes & Insha Allah (2020)

Singles from El-Hadj
- 1. "Asalamalekun" Released: 11 March 2016; 2. "Owo Re" Released: 13 May 2016; 3. "Nobody Knows" Released: 9 July 2016

El-Hadj is the fourth studio album by the Nigerian rapper Reminisce, released on 29 August 2016. The album features guest appearances from 2Baba, Olamide, Seriki, 9ice, Ice Prince, Solidstar, and Mr Eazi, as well as collaborations with his label signees Sojay and Oladips. Its production was handled by Sarz, Sossick, Jomane, Pbankz, TSpize, Tyce, Camo Blaizz, and TMXO. It serves as a follow-up to Baba Hafusa (2015). On 7 September 2016, El-Hadj debuted on the Billboard World Albums chart.

== Background ==
Reminisce revealed the artwork for El-Hadj on 11 July 2016. The album's track listing was revealed on 22 August 2016. On the same day, Reminisce ended his contract with Edge Records for reasons that remain unclear.

== Critical reception ==
Professional ratings
Review scores
Source	Rating
Pulse Nigeria	4/5 stars
tooXclusive	4.5/5 stars
360nobs	7/10
NotJustOk	7.5/10
Filterfree	81%

Wilfred Okiche of 360nobs described El-Hadj as an album built on "menacing beats", "familiar themes of sex, religion and the hustle", and "big name collaborations" with "slick production work", concluding that it "may be Reminisce’s most accessible album yet" and "a pilgrimage to the mind of the man and his experiences so far". He rated the album 7 out of 10. Joey Akan of Pulse Nigeria gave El-Hadj a rating of 4 out of 5 stars, calling it a "solid grounded work" that reflected Reminisce's "grounded mentality" and "deeper level of narration and vulnerability", concluding that it was "a pilgrimage of some sort" as the rapper sought to "recreate his Mecca".

Tola Sarumi of NotJustOk said El-Hadj was "a reawakening" and "a rebirth in many ways", praising its "versatility and depth", "good marriage of production, lyrics and relevance", and calling it "a grown man rap album for the most part", concluding that "Reminisce almost delivers the perfect body of work his talent is capable of, and rating the album a 7.5 out of 10. Temitope Dolano of tooXclusive rated it a 4.5/5, praising the album's "different genre[s]", featured artists, and "signature vulgar lyrics", concluding that Reminisce "did show he truly deserved his name" and "placed the bar a foot higher".

=== Accolades ===
Year	Award ceremony	Prize	Result
2018	The Headies	Best Rap Album	Won

== Track listing ==
El-Hadj track listing
No.	Title	Writer(s)	Producer(s)	Length
1.	"Asalamalekun"	Remilekun Safaru	Sarz	3:33
2.	"Where I Come From"	Safaru	Sossick	3:30
3.	"Ibadi"	Safaru	Sossick	3:42
4.	"Konsignment"	Safaru	Jomane	3:04
5.	"I.E.N.B.G" (featuring Mr Eazi)	Safaru; Oluwatosin Ajibade	Sarz	3:43
6.	"1.4 D.R" (featuring Solidstar)	Safaru; Joshua Iniyezo	Pbankz	3:38
7.	"Ori"	Safaru	TSpize	3:13
8.	"I Remember"	Safaru	Sossick	3:22
9.	"Skit" (featuring Terry Apala)	Terry Ejeh	—	0:48
10.	"Telephone" (featuring Olamide)	Safaru; Olamide Adedeji	Pheelz	3:02
11.	"Simple Boy" (featuring 9ice)	Safaru; Alexander Ajifolajifola	Tyce	3:14
12.	"Daily Basis"	Safaru	Camo Blaiz	3:26
13.	"Nobody Knows" (featuring 2Baba)	Safaru; Innocent Idibia	TMXO	3:44
14.	"Owo Re"	Safaru	Camo Blaiz	2:57
15.	"Oloun" (featuring Oladips)	Safaru; Oladipupo Oladimeji	Sossick	3:25
16.	"Larger Than Life" (featuring Sojay)	Safaru; Samuel Okorie Jr.	Sossick	3:13

Bonus track
No.	Title	Writer(s)	Producer(s)	Length
17.	"Feego" (featuring Seriki, Oladips and Ice Prince)	Safaru; Ibiyemi Seriki; Oladimeji; Panshak Zamani	Sossick	5:06
Total length:				56:50

Notes

- "—" denotes a skit

== Personnel ==
- Remilekun "Reminisce" Safaru – primary artist, songwriter
- Oluwatosin "Mr Eazi" Ajibade – featured artist (track 5), songwriter
- Joshua "Solidstar" Iniyezo – featured artist (track 6), songwriter
- Terry Apala – Featured artist (track 9), songwriter
- Olamide Adedeji – featured artist (track 10), songwriter
- Alexander "9ice" Ajifolajifola – featured artist (track 11), songwriter
- Innocent "2Baba" Idibia – featured artist (track 13), songwriter
- Oladipupo "Oladips" Oladimeji – featured artist (tracks 15, 17), songwriter
- Samuel "Sojay" Okorie Jr. – featured artist (track 16), songwriter
- Ibiyemi "Seriki" Seriki – featured artist (track 17), songwriter
- Panshak "Ice Prince" Zamani – featured artist (track 17), songwriter
- Sarz – producer (tracks 1, 5)
- Sossick – producer (tracks 2, 3, 8, 13, 15–17)
- Jomane – producer (track 4)
- Pbankz – producer (track 6)
- TSpize – producer (track 7)
- Pheelz – producer (track 10)
- Tyce – producer (track 11)
- Camo Blaiz – producer (tracks 12, 14)
- TMXO – producer (track 13)

== Release history ==
Release history and formats for El-Hadj
Region	Date	Format	Label
Various	29 August 2016	CD; digital download	LRR Entertainment
