= Alaga Ibile =

Studio album by Reminisce
- Released: 15 November 2013
- Recorded: 2012–13
- Genre: Afrobeats; fuji; hip-hop
- Length: 55:25
- Label: Edge; LRR
- Producer: Sossick; Sarz; Jospo; Chopstix; DeeVee; Shizzi

Reminisce chronology
Book of Rap Stories (2012)	Alaga Ibile (2013)	Baba Hafusa (2015)

Singles from Alaga Ibile
- 1. "Government" Released: 4 March 2013; 2. "Fantasi" Released: 16 July 2013; 3. "3rd World Thug" Released: 21 September 2013; 4. "Sunkere" Released: 8 October 2013; 5. "Eleniyan" Released: 31 October 2013; 6. "Daddy" Released: 24 January 2014

Alaga Ibile (Yoruba: Lord of the Streets) is the second studio album by Nigerian rapper Reminisce. It was initially released for digital download on iTunes on 7 November 2013, before being released physically by Edge Records and LRR Entertainment on 15 November 2013. The album features a blend of Afrobeats, fuji and hip-hop, and was supported by the singles "Government", "Fantasi", "3rd World Thug", "Eleniyan", and "Daddy".

Spanning fifteen tracks and a bonus track, it features artists such as Davido, Wizkid, Olamide, Burna Boy, Naeto C, Obadice, Sossick, and Endia. Production was handled by Sossick, Sarz, Jospo, Chopstix, DeeVee and Shizzi. The album was nominated for Best Rap Album at The Headies 2014 and won Rap Album of the Year at the 2014 City People Entertainment Awards. Alaga Ibile follows up to Book of Rap Stories (2012).

== Background ==
Following the release of his debut album, Book of Rap Stories (2012), Reminisce began work on his second studio album, Alaga Ibile, which was initially was titled Alaye and meant to span 10 tracks. In an interview with OkayAfrica, he said that his debut didn't earn him the critical acclaim he had hoped for, as his songs "2Mussh" and "Kako Bi Chicken" led some to question his credibility as a rapper. He later met producer Sossick, who he said recognized his talent, and the pair began working together on Alaga Ibile.

== Composition ==
The album's intro track features piano-driven production and lyrics about Reminisce's upbringing and challenges. "Government", featuring Olamide and Endia, blends a heavy Chopstix-produced beat with Yoruba-language verses and a mix of rap and dancehall. "Sunkere" and "Fantasi" see Reminisce blending hip-hop with fuji. "Agidigbo" is an ode to sex workers.

== Singles and other releases ==
"Nigboro", released on 26 January 2013, was included as a bonus track off Alaga Ibile. The Sarz-produced song is a remastered version of one of Reminisce's older songs. Alaga Ibile's lead single, "Government", was released on 4 March 2013. It features Olamide and Endia, and was produced by Chopstix. On 27 June 2013, Reminisce released the album's intro track as a promotional single. The Fuji-influenced second single, "Fantasi", was released on 16 July 2013. The song was produced by Sarz. "Agidigbo" was released as another promotional single from Alaga Ibile on 23 August 2013. "3rd World Thug" was released on 21 September 2013 as the album's third single. The song was produced by Sossick.

The fourth single off the album, "Sunkere", was released on 8 October 2013 and features production from DeeVee. On 5 October 2013, Reminisce released "Hurricane" featuring PayBac as another promotional single; the track ended up not making it to the album and features a sample of Madonna's "Like a Prayer". The album's fifth single, "Eleniyan", was released on 31 October 2013 and features Wizkid. The song was produced by Sarz. The sixth and final single "Daddy" featuring Davido was released on 24 January 2014 alongside its music video directed by Patrick Elis. It received nominations for Best Collaboration at the 2014 Nigeria Entertainment Awards, Best Collabo of the Year at the 2014 City People Entertainment Awards, and Best Collaboration at the Ben TV Awards in 2014.

== Critical reception ==
Ayomide Tayo of Nigerian Entertainment Today rated the album a 3.5/5, stating that "despite his limited range, Reminisce has dropped a solid album that should see him in the top spot with his contemporaries". Wilfred Okiche of YNaija had mixed feelings about the album, stating that "Towards the final arc, Alaga Ibile loses a lot of steam and starts to bore with its sub-stellar tracks." He then pointed out that while the album "won't set the charts or market on fire," it "serves some purpose, introducing Reminisce to a wider audience."

=== Accolades ===
Year	Awards ceremony	Award description(s)	Results
2014	The Headies	Best Rap Album	Nominated
2014	City People Entertainment Awards	Rap Album of the Year	Won

== Track listing ==
Alaga Ibile track listing
No.	Title	Writer(s)	Producer(s)	Length
1.	"Intro"	Remilekun Safaru	Sossick	3:45
2.	"Government" (featuring Olamide, Endia)	Safaru; Olamide Adedeji; Ujah Lawrence	Chopstix	3:39
3.	"Sunkere"	Safaru	Dee Vee	3:43
4.	"Fantasi"	Safaru	Sarz	3:24
5.	"Eleniyan" (featuring Wizkid)	Safaru; Ayodeji Balogun	Sarz	3:42
6.	"Turn It Around" (featuring Sossick)	Safaru; Esosa Osemwengie	Sossick	3:14
7.	"Swagu" (featuring Obadice)	Safaru; Oyeleye Ibrahim	Sossick	3:44
8.	"Buga" (featuring Naeto C)	Safaru; Naetochukwu Chikwe	Sossick	3:51
9.	"3rd World Thug"	Safaru	Sossick	2:28
10.	"Ife"	Safaru	Jospo	3:14
11.	"Agidigbo"	Safaru	Jospo	4:00
12.	"Fela"	Safaru	Sossick	3:12
13.	"Daddy" (featuring Davido)	Safaru; David Adeleke	Shizzi	4:00
14.	"Rude Gyal" (featuring Burna Boy)	Safaru; Damini Ogulu	Sossick	3:34
15.	"Pimp by Blood"	Safaru	Sossick	2:58

Bonus track
No.	Title	Writer(s)	Producer(s)	Length
16.	"Nigboro"	Safaru	Sarz	2:51
Total length:				55:25

Notes

- "Pimp by Blood" features a sample of Jay-Z's song "I Just Wanna Love U (Give It 2 Me)" featuring Pharrell Williams.

== Personnel ==
- Reminisce – primary artist
- Wizkid – featured artist
- Obadice – featured artist
- Burna Boy – featured artist
- Naeto C – featured artist
- Sossick – featured artist
- Davido – featured artist
- Endia – featured artist
- Olamide – featured artist
- Sossick – producer
- Sarz – producer
- Jospo – producer
- Chopstix – producer
- Dee Vee – producer
- Shizzi – producer
- Accessways Production - video director
- Jassy Generation - video director
- MEX Films - video director
- Patrick Elis - video director
- Unlimited L.A - video director

== Release history ==
Release history and formats for Alaga Ibile
Region	Date	Format	Label
Various	7 November 2013	Digital download	Edge
Nigeria	15 November 2013	CD	Edge; LRR
