= Reminisce (rapper) =

Nigerian rapper, singer and songwriter

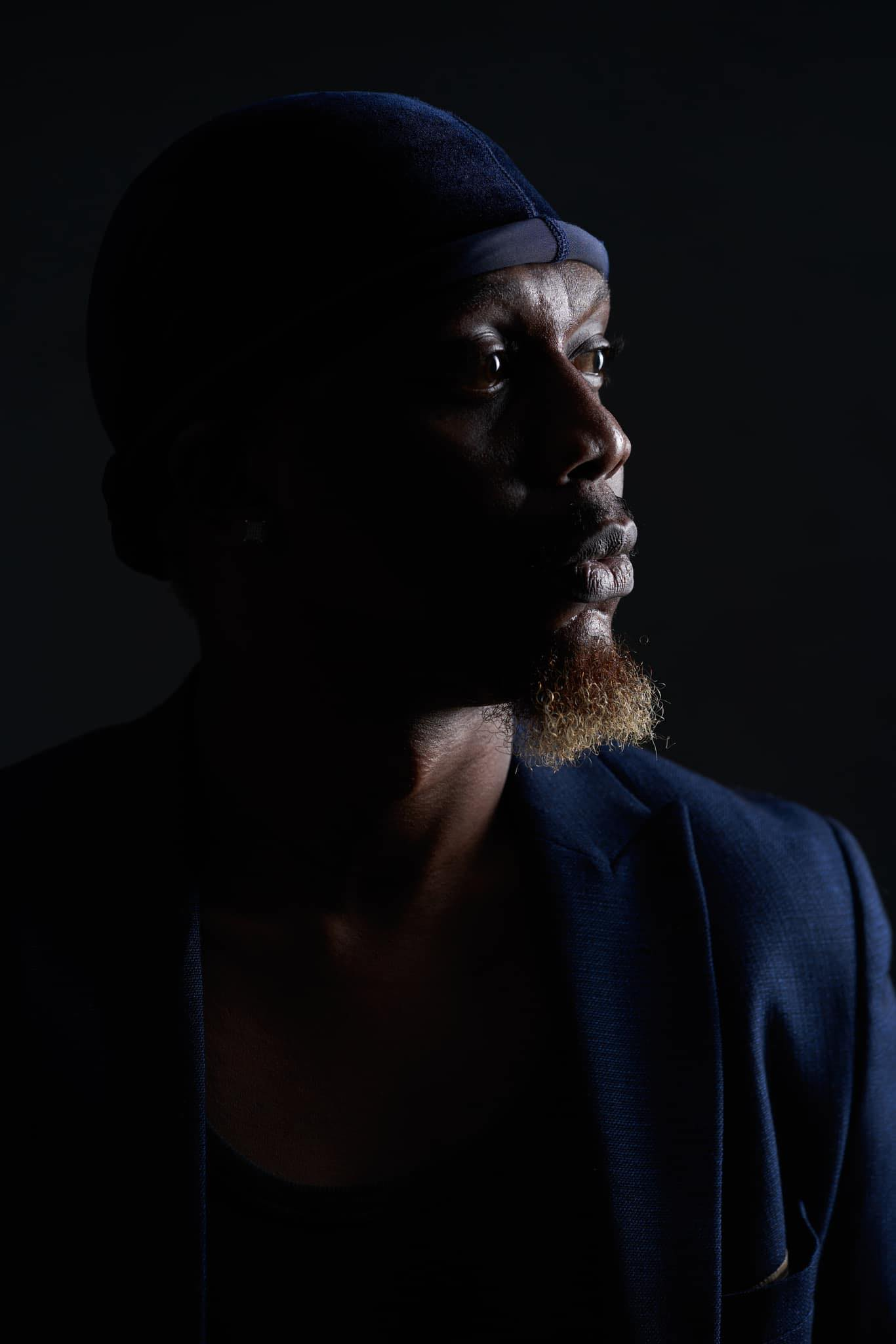
- Born: Remilekun Abdulkalid Safaru; 26 January 1981 (age 45); Kaduna, Kaduna State, Nigeria
- Other names: Alaga Ibile; Baba Hafusa
- Education: Kwara State Polytechnic
- Occupations: Singer; rapper; songwriter; actor
- Years active: 2008–present
- Musical career
- Origin: Ogun State, Nigeria
- Genres: Afrobeats; hip-hop
- Instruments: Vocals
- Labels: LRR; Edge (former)

Remilekun Abdulkalid Safaru (born 26 January 1981), professionally known as Reminisce, is a Nigerian singer, rapper, songwriter, and actor. Originating from Ogun State, he performs in English and in his native language, Yoruba.

== Early life ==
Reminisce is from Ajilete, Yewa South LGA in Ogun State, the western part of Nigeria. He was born on January 26, 1981, in Kaduna state, Northern Nigeria. In school, he listened to various genres of local and foreign music and performed in school activities. He studied purchasing and supply at Kwara State Polytechnic.

== Music career ==
Reminisce recorded his first song in a studio in 2006 and recorded a rap album at Coded Tunes, but the album was never released and he decided to focus on his studies and complete schooling. In 2008, Reminisce performed a rap verse on a track titled "Bachelor's Life" off 9ice's second album titled Gongo Aso. His first single, "Ever Since", featured 9ice, and was a story about his life until that moment. His second single, "If Only", was a love song produced by D'Tunes.

His song titled "Local Rappers," released in 2015, featured Olamide and Phyno and had some controversial comments from fans as they felt the song was targeted at rappers who rap in English such as MI and Mode9. In 2015, Reminisce was named a brand ambassador for the Orijin alcoholic beverage brand.

Reminisce is signed to Les Roses Rouge (LRR) Records, and he is the only Nigerian rapper to have two albums debut on the billboard charts; Baba Hafusa at number 12, and El-Hadj at number 13.

=== Book of Rap Stories ===
Reminisce's first album, Book of Rap Stories, was released on 31 March 2012. He started recording the album in 2010 after linking up with the studio producer Sarz at Edge Records Studios. The studio allowed him to make the album bilingual. The album was produced by Sarz, Legendury Beatz, Joshbeatz, Jospo and PastorChild. The album did well commercially in the southern part of Nigeria.

=== Alaga Ibile ===
His second album, Alaga Ibile, was officially released on 15 November 2013. It marked a significant milestone in his music career. Alaga Ibile translates to "Chairman of the City" in Yoruba.

The album sold million of copies before the end of 2014. In 2014, Time magazine named Reminisce one of the seven "World Rappers You Should Meet.” He was also named by Nigerian music site NotJustOk, as one of the top three hip-hop artists of 2014.

=== Baba Hafusa ===
Reminisce's third album, Baba Hafusa, was released on April 30, 2015. Reminisce became the first hip hop artist in Africa to have an album debut on the US Billboard World Albums chart at no. 12.

Described as a "genre busting album", it was a strong contender for album of the year with music critics and fans alike applauding the fusion of sounds to form a unique blend of hip hop, fuji and Afrobeats.

=== El-Hadj ===
"El-Hadj" is the fourth studio album by the Nigerian rapper Reminisce, and it was released on August 29, 2016. Reminisce became the first hip hop artist in Africa to have two albums debut on Billboard Charts World Music category at no. 13.

"El-Hadj" contains a variety of tracks that explore different themes and styles of rap. Some of the notable tracks on the album include "Asalamalekun," "Konsignment," "Ibadi," "If E No Be God" featuring Mr. Eazi, and "Feego" featuring Seriki, Ice Prince, and Ola Dips.

=== Vibes & Insha Allah EP ===
Reminisce released the EP Vibes & Insha Allah on 29 July 2020 through LRR Entertainment. It features guest appearances from Nigerian singers Fireboy DML and Tiwa Savage, and Reminisce's children Mo and Fatimah Safaru, who also serve as the EP's executive producers. The EP's production was handled by Sarz, TMXO, Krizbeatz, Looneytunes, and Aivert. It garnered over 4.5 million streams on Audiomack in 4 months.

Vibes and Insha Allah was developed during the COVID-19 lockdown in 2020. By March of that year, Reminisce was staying indoors with his family and adjusting to new routines. He had stopped smoking at the start of the lockdown and had stayed away from alcohol since returning from Hajj in August 2019. Work on a new project had begun in late 2019, but the lockdown changed the recording process. For the first time in his career, he learned how to record and engineer his vocals through online tutorials and guidance from producers, as he did not want anyone in his house. He later deleted earlier recordings and re-recorded the entire project by himself. The EP's opening track came from a studio session where his daughters interrupted him during recording. His two daughters were later credited as executive producers. The project was initially titled 30+ Vibes, but he changed the name after feedback from his team. The final title, Vibes & Insha Allah, was inspired by his comments on Liverpool FC's playing style. Reminisce sought to create songs that reflected personal themes and his study of streaming trends. He had taken an 18-month break after El-Hadj (2016) to understand digital rollouts and listener demographics, which influenced the approach to the EP. Fireboy DML recorded his verse for "Ogaranya" within hours, and Tiwa Savage appeared on "Eja Osan", their first collaboration since "Diet" in 2018. A planned collaboration with Wizkid did not materialise due to scheduling.

The EP received generally positive reviews from critics. Olalekan Okeremilekun, writing for tooXclusive said Vibes & Insha Allah showed Reminisce in strong form, calling it "well calculated and delivered" and noting that tracks like "Ogaranya" and "Gbedu" proved he could blend street energy with focus and range. Emmanuel Esomnofu, writing a review for NotjustOk, viewed the EP as a "grown project" that proved Reminisce's family life with street focus and noted that it could "set you upon a joyous cruise" while keeping his core style intact. Pulse Nigeria's Motolani Alake saw Vibes & Insha Allah as a focused project with "no throwaways" and felt it balanced street needs with adult themes, calling it "a sound body of work" and giving it an 8/10.

== Films ==
Reminisce played a role in the Nigerian movie King of Boys, which was released in 2018. "King of Boys" is a Nigerian political crime thriller film directed by Kemi Adetiba and features a star-studded cast. In 2021, he made a reappearance in the sequel, King of Boys; Return of the King.

== Discography ==
=== Studio albums ===
- Book of Rap Stories (2012)
- Alaga Ibile (2013)
- Baba Hafusa (2015)
- El-Hadj (2016)
- ATSG, Vol. 1 (2023)

=== EPs ===
- Vibes & Insha Allah (2020)
- Sui Generis (2023)
