= Tolu Adesina =

- Born: Tolulope Abraham Adesina; Kaduna, Nigeria
- Occupations: Singer, songwriter, actor

Tolulope Abraham Adesina (Tolu) is a Nigerian singer, songwriter, recording artist, music producer, and actor born in Kaduna, Northern Nigeria. He was a finalist at the 2010 MTN Project Fame.

== Early life ==
Adesina was born into a Baptist family in Barnawa, Kaduna, and grew up as a church boy. He joined the church choir at 11 where he gained most of his musical exposure. His girl-like soprano vocals always stand him out. Growing up, he was fascinated with legends of music like Michael Jackson, Boyz II Men, R Kelly, Joe, New Edition, 112, Whitney Houston and Brandy.

== Education and Music Career ==
Adesina studied architecture at Kaduna Polytechnic. His foray into professional music started when he auditioned for West African Idols in 2008. He also auditioned for BET’s Sunday’s Best in 2009 anchored by American Gospel Singer Kirk Franklin and was the only finalist from Nigeria that year. His breakthrough came in 2010 when he made it to the MTN Project Fame finals as one of the six winners in Season 3. That year, he released his debut single Arewa which received massive airplay in Nigeria. After Project Fame, he moved to Lagos, Nigeria where he met CEO of Mavin Records, Don Jazzy. That year, Adesina worked with Don Jazzy to produce "My lover". He also recorded another single, "Ife Mi", produced by Kaduna-born music producer Baby Fresh. In 2015, Adesina teamed up with Tiwa Savage to record a version of "Silent Night". He landed his first television role in MTV's Shuga Season 5. Adesina has also recorded several gospel songs including "I’m a star", "Holies of Holies", "Lala", and "I'm Here".

== Discography ==
=== Singles ===
- Arewa - 2010
- Iam3hree EP - 2011
- Shakara
- gets me up
- Whine it - 2012
- My lover ft Donjazzy - 2014
- Jemappelle Tolu - 2014
- Arewa (beautiful) ft Dj soupamodel -2014
- Ifemi ft Donjazzy - 2015
- 3sum EP - 2016
- Newtinz
- Newtinz
- Prettymama
- champion ft Cdq
- Shuga Rush - 2017
- Oshe Baba - 2018
- Lala - 2018
- Adaba - 2018
- I’m Here - 2018
- Nothing Without You ft Nikki Laoye - 2018
