= DJ Xclusive =

Nigerian disc jockey and record producer

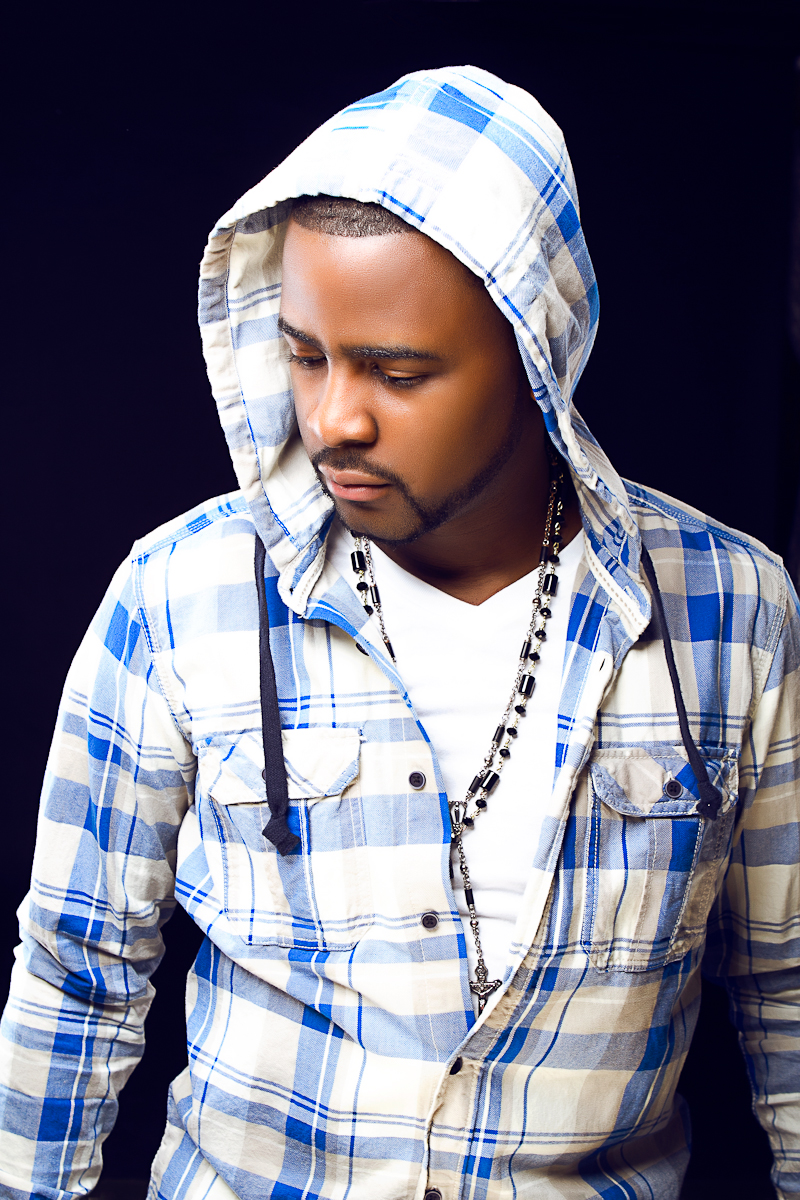

Background information
- Born: Rotimi Alakija; 16 October 1980 (age 45); St Austell, England
- Occupations: Dj, record producer, recording artist
- Years active: 2003–present
- Label: Empire Mates Entertainment (former)

Rotimi Alakija (born 16 October 1980), better known as DJ Xclusive, is a British-Nigerian disc jockey, record producer and recording artist.

== Early life ==
Rotimi Alakija was born in England to Nigerian parents. At an early age, he moved back to Nigeria to pursue a high school education at King's College, Lagos. Rotimi Alakija moved back to the UK to study Physics and Computer Science at Reading University, where he earned a Bachelor's degree. He later studied Financial Computing at Brunel University London.

== Career ==
DJ Xclusive started his professional disc jockey career in 2003 by performing at various night clubs, including Aura Mayfair, Penthouse, Funky Buddha and Jalouse. During the course of his career, DJ Xclusive has performed with acts like Ne-Yo, Rihanna, Mario Winans, Brick and Lace, Nas and Fat Joe.

At the 2010 edition of the Nigeria Entertainment Awards, held in the United States, DJ Xclusive won World Best DJ. He was nominated for Best DJ at the 2011 edition of the BEFFTA Awards. He was also featured at the 2013 Big Brother House Party.

In 2011, DJ Xclusive became the resident DJ for CoolFM 96.9 and also joined Empire Mates Entertainment as Wizkid's official DJ. DJ Xclusive released a single "I'm Xclusive" alongside UK-Nigerian artist Mo Eazy.

In 2015, DJ Xclusive featured on Evelle's debut single "Waiting" alongside renowned producer Masterkraft. The song served as Evelle's first official release after winning Nigerian Idol 2014.

In 2025, DJ Xclusive remained one of Nigeria’s most sought-after DJs, known for his energetic performances at upscale Lagos events and steady presence in the city’s nightlife mix culture.

== Personal life ==
DJ Xclusive married Tinuke Ogundero in 2015. He is also the nephew of Nigerian billionaire Folorunsho Alakija.

== Discography ==
=== Singles ===
- "Pangolo" (featuring Timaya) (2013)
- "Ibebe" (featuring Olamide) (2013)
- "Gal Bad" (featuring D'Prince and Wizkid) (2014)
- "Jeje" (featuring Wizkid (2014)
- "Fatasi" (featuring Terry G) (2014)
- "Tonight" (featuring Banky W and Niyola) (2014)
- "Shaba" (featuring Kcee and Patoranking) (2014)
- "Dami Si" (featuring Lil Kesh and CDQ) (2015)
- "Oyoyo" (featuring Burna Boy) (2016)
- "Shawarma" (featuring Masterkraft) (2016)
- "Pose" (featuring Tiwa Savage)(2017)
- Gbomo Gbomo (featuring Zlatan Ibile)(2019)
- "Mad O" (2020)
- "Buga" (featuring T-Classic) (2020)
- "Sweet 16" (featuring Soft)) (2020)
- "Pariwo" (featuring Dotman)(2020)

== Videography ==
Year	Title	Director	Ref
2016	Cash Only	—N/a	

== Albums ==
- According to X (2015)

== EPs ==
- The XFiles EP Session 1 (2020)

== Compilation albums ==
- Empire Mates State of Mind (2012)

== See also ==
- List of Nigerian DJs
