= Lord of Ajasa =

Nigerian rapper

- Also known as: Lord of Ajasa
- Born: Olusegun Osaniyi; 16 July 1974 (age 52); Akure, Nigeria
- Origin: Ondo
- Genres: Afropop; hip hop
- Occupations: Rapper; singer; songwriter
- Years active: 2000-present
- Label: Apashe Records
- Website: http://www.lordofajasa.com/

Olusegun Osaniyi (born July 16, 1974), who is known by his stage name "Lord of Ajasa" is a Nigerian rapper, singer and the CEO of Apashe Records. He is a native of Akure, Ondo State. He was given the name "the Lord of Flavor" (Ajasa is Yoruba term for flavor) in his polytechnic days in Ondo state, where he majored in Quantity Survey. He raps primarily in Yoruba Language. "Ma yi lo" was his first track which made him popular and it came out in 2000. In the beginning of his career, he collaborated with 9ice, Olamide, and the late Da Grin, among other Nigerian singers.

Due to his health challenge, which was diagnosed to be peptic ulcer, he left the music industry with the claim that he was into other businesses which required time to stabilize.

== List of songs ==
- Ma yi lo
- Le Fenu So
- Oti Ya
- Ara Awe
- Lacasera
- Who Be Dat
- Halelluya
- Bi Ere
- Omo Igboro
- Omo PIshaun
- Tete Wa
- I Dey 4 Party
- Ojumo Re
- Aye Mon
- Lori Ila
- Figure 8
- Democrazy
- Ki Lo Mo
- Ijala
- The Spirit
- See drama
- Eso lo bade
- Kelegbe
- New Era
- Anyhow

== Health challenge ==
In 2019, he was said to be in urgent need of funds to undergo a peptic ulcer operation.
