= Edge Records =

Nigerian record label

EDGE Records
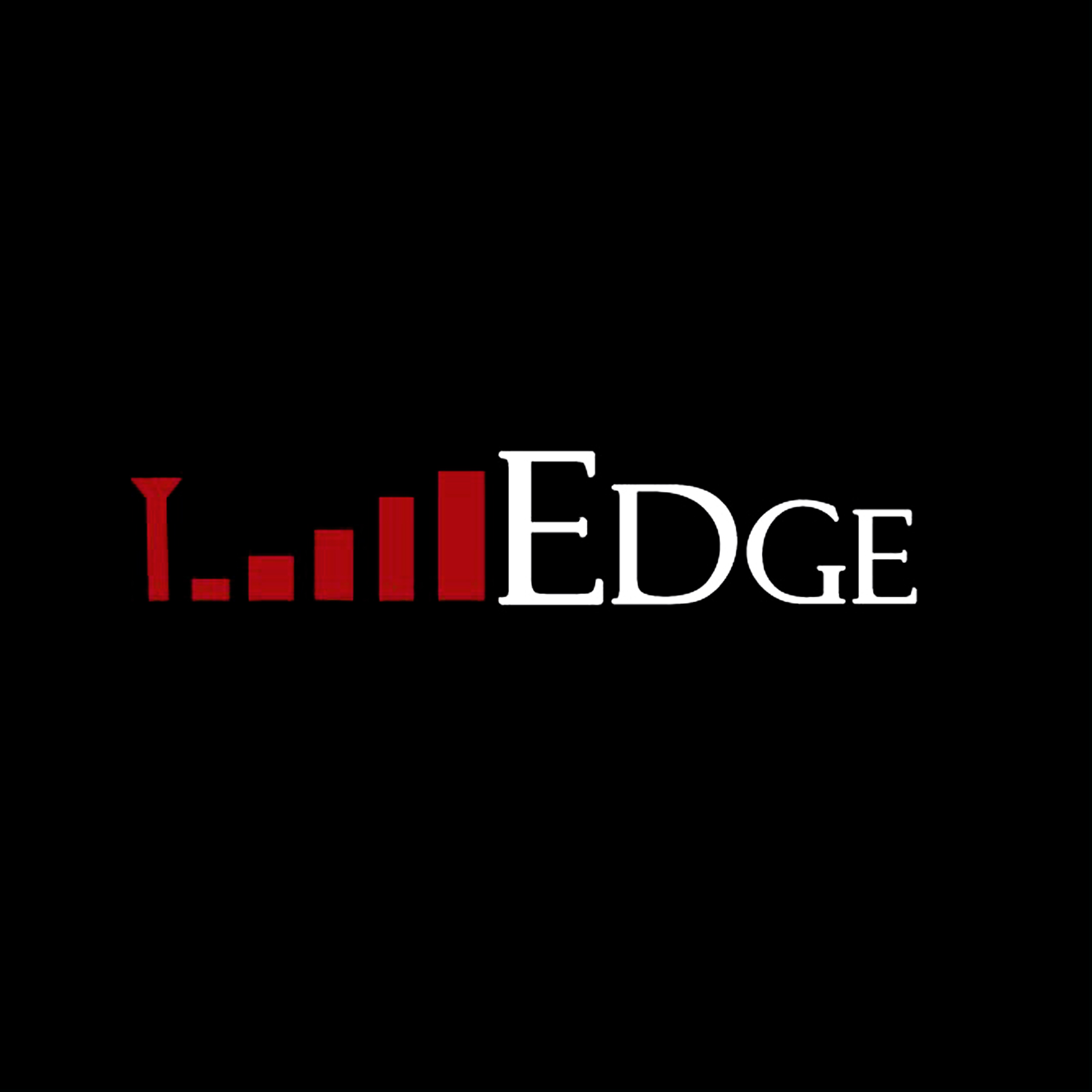
- Official logo
- Parent company: EDGE Entertainment Ltd.
- Founded: 2005
- Founder: Ibrahim Okulaja; JahBless
- Genre: Various
- Country of origin: Nigeria
- Location: Fadeyi, Lagos State

EDGE Records is a Lagos-based music record label jointly established by Ibrahim Okulaja and JahBless. The record label was founded in 2005 with 9ice becoming its first music act in 2006 before the release of his first studio album titled Certificate.

== Artists ==
=== Current ===
- Reminisce
- Ola Dips

=== Former ===
- 9ice

== Discography ==
Year	Artist	Album title	Album details
2006	9ice	Certificate	Released: 2006; Formats: CD, digital download
2008	Reminisce	Book of Rap Stories	Released: March 31, 2012; Formats: CD, digital download
2013	Reminisce	Alaga Ibile	Released: November 15, 2013; Formats: CD, digital download
2015	Reminisce	Baba Hafusa	Released: April 30, 2015; Formats: CD, digital download
