= Terry G =

Nigerian singer-songwriter (born 1986)

- Also known as: Akpako Master, Ginjah Master, Hitman, G.zuz, Terry G.zuz
- Born: Gabriel Oche Amanyi; 17 March 1986 (age 40); Benue State, Nigeria
- Genres: Chante-chante, afro pop dancehall
- Occupations: Singer-songwriter, recording artist, performer, dancer, producer
- Instruments: Vocals, Keyboard guitar daxophone drums
- Years active: 2006–present
- Label: PRIMECREST Entertainment,

Gabriel Oche Amanyi (born 17 March 1986), popularly known by his stage name Terry G, is a Nigerian rapper, singer, songwriter and record executive. He is widely known for his eccentric dress-sense, controversial lyrics and awkward identity. He has been described by The Punch as "one of the world's weirdest singers", by Vanguard, and by Channels TV as the "craziest musician in Nigeria". In 2013, he released his fourth album, titled Book of Ginjah.

== Personal life ==
Terry G was born in Benue State and shares a birthday with his mother. He started singing in the choir of his local church.

== Career ==
Through his songs, he has admitted to using drugs and alcohol. In September 2014, he told Jane Augoye of The Punch that he had stopped taking hard drugs.

He has cited Fela Kuti as his greatest musical mentor.

== Discography ==
=== Albums ===
- Free Me
- Ginjah Ur Swaggah (Season 1)
- Terry G.zuz
- "His Royal Madness"
- Book of Ginjah
- "Terry G essentials"

=== Compilations ===
- Happy Birthday To Me

=== Singles ===
- "So High"
- "Run Mad"
- "Testing Microphone"
- "Free Madness"
- "Love Affair"
- "Sexy Lady"
- "Oga"
- "Ora"
- "Baby Don't Go"
- "Furret"
- "Omo Dada"
- "Adura"
- "Kolomala"
- "Nue Nue"
- "Happy Birthday To Me"
- "Ferari"
- "Nue Nue"

=== Collaborations ===
- Timaya - Malonogede feat. Terry G
- Terry G ft. 9ice - Ori Mi
- Terry G feat. Wizkid, Phyno, Runtown - Knack Am
- Terry G feat. Skiibii - Adura
- YungBilo(Martins Osodi) - Money Matter feats Terry G
- Jaywon feat. Terry G - Gbon Gbon
- Terry G - Brukutu feat. Awilo & Timaya
- Sani Musa Danja - Basu Iyawa ft. Terry G

== Awards ==
Best New Artist at the Nigerian Entertainment Awards

== Selected videography ==
Year	Title	Director	Ref
2016	Nonsense	Alien and Lucas Reid	
