= Mode 9 =

Nigerian rapper (born 1975)

Modenine
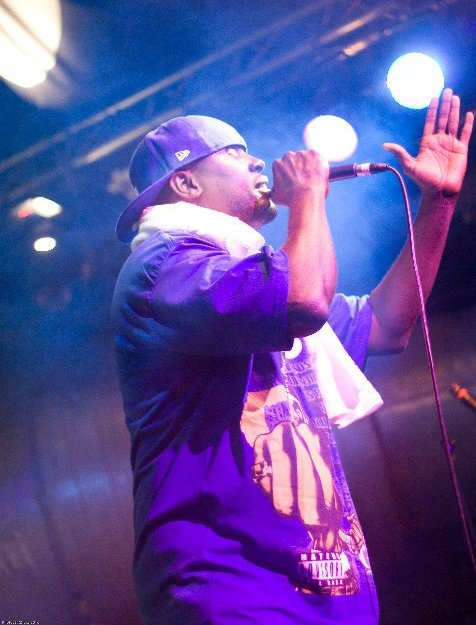
- Modenine performing in 2010

Background information
- Also known as: Nigel Benn
- Born: Babatunde Olusegun Adewale; June 14, 1975 (age 51); Paddington, England
- Origin: Osun State, Nigeria
- Genres: Rap, Hip hop
- Occupations: Rapper, lyricist
- Years active: 1999–present
- Label: Redeye Muzik
- Website: officialmodenine.com

Babatunde Olusegun Adewale (born June 14, 1975), popularly known by his stage name Modenine, is an English-born Nigerian rapper. He is a seven times Headies lyricist on the roll winner and he is widely regarded by industry heads as one of the greatest African lyricists of all time.

In 2014, he released "Super Human" with Jamaican-American rapper, Canibus.

== Early life and education ==
Babatunde was born in London on June 14, 1975, and his family relocated to Lagos during his preteen years. He is the third child of his parents who are from Osun State. He has credited Grandmaster Flash and The Furious Five for inspiring his love for hip-hop. He attended Agboju secondary school. He earned a degree in Building Technology at Federal Polytechnic Bida, Niger State, Nigeria.

== Career ==
He worked with Rhythm 84.7fm in Abuja, Nigeria as a radio presenter.

In 2004, Babatunde released his debut project, Malcolm IX. In 2006 "Pentium IX" was released . In 2007, he released another album called É Pluribus Unum. The album's main single, 'Cry', won three awards at the Channel O Music Video Awards in 2006. It also won the award for "Best Rap Single" at The Headies. Modenine has eight studio albums.

In 2018, Babatunde released a new album titled "Hence4th" which was produced by Black Intelligence. In 2019, he released an album titled The Monument

He released an album in 2022 titled Popkorn! The Album as a soundtrack for his podcast of the same name.

In 2024, he released Shiny Object Syndrome which received a nomination for Best Rap Album at the 17th Headies Awards.

== Accolades ==
- 2006: "Cry" won awards at the Channel O Music Video Awards
- 2007: Won 'Best Rap Single' for "Cry" at The Headies.

== Discography ==
Single Albums

- Malcolm IX -2004
- Pentium IX - 2006
- E' Pluribus Unum "One Amongst Many" -2007
- The Paradigm Shift -2008
- Da Vinci Mode -2010
- Above Ground Level - 2014
- Insulin - 2016
- The Monument (By Stormatique) - 2019
- Popkorn! The Album - 2022
- Shiny Object Syndrome - 2024

Joint Albums

- Modenine & Alias - Pay At-10-Shun - 2010
- Modenine & Mills The Producer - Golden Era Guevara New Era Mandela - 2011
- Modenine & XYZ - Alphabetical Order - 2013
- Modenine and DJ Papercutt - Look What I Found EP - 2016
- Modenine & Black Intelligence - Hence4th - 2018
- Modenine & Black Intelligence ft Maka -Thereafter - 2025

Mixtapes

- Malcolm IX - The Lost Sessions - 2004
- Pentium IX - The Mixtape - 2005
- Nigel Benn's KraftWork (Modenine and Kraft) - The Soul Edition - 2007
- 09.09.09 The Mix Tape - 2009
- Occupy The Throne - 2012
- The Orisuna Experiments - 2023
- Dusty Refixes - 2024

‘’’Features’’’

- ’’ODUMODUBLVCK - INDUSTRY MACHINE - 2025’’
