= Ruggedman =

Nigerian rapper

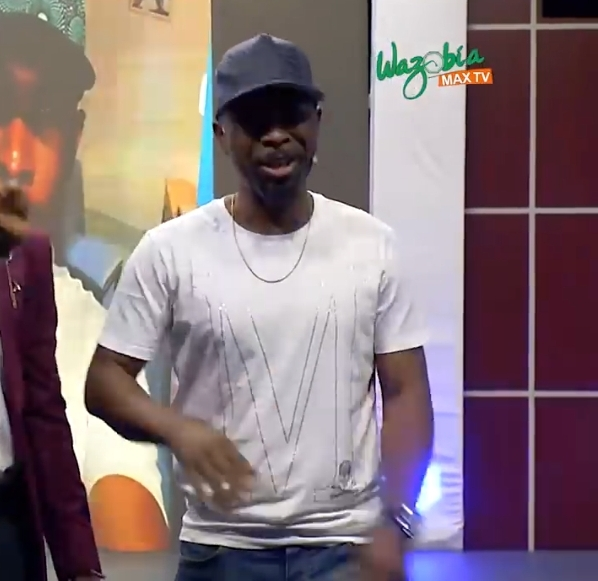

Background information
- Also known as: Ruggedy Baba, Opomulero, Mr Controversial
- Born: Michael Ugochukwu Stephens; September 20
- Origin: Ohafia, Nigeria
- Genres: African hip hop
- Occupations: Rapper, record producer
- Years active: 1999–present
- Label: Rugged Records

Michael Ugochukwu Stephens, known professionally as Ruggedman, is a Nigerian rapper from Ohafia, Nigeria.

== Career ==
A graduate of political science from Lagos State University, Ọ̀jọ́. Ruggedman started exploring music in 1999. He produced his own songs and released two well-received tracks in 1999. His albums are all released on his personal label, Rugged Records.

Ruggedman's record label, Rugged Records, signed its first act, singer MBRYO, in September 2012. MBRYO was featured on Ruggedman's "Ruggedy Baba pt 2″, produced by Blaize Beatz. Money Making Music, Ruggedman's 2012 album, is a collaboration with MBRYO serving as a promotion for the artist. The album also had guest appearances by Terry G and Funbi.

Ruggedman hosted the Star Quest Reality TV Talent Show in 2009, 2010, and 2011.

== Discography ==
Albums

- Thy Album Come (2004)
- Ruggedy Baba (2007)
- Untouchable (2010)
- Money Making Music (2012)
- Situation (2021)
- The Michael Stephens Experiment (2024)

== Singles ==
Year	Title	Album	Ref
2016	Seyi Shay Featuring Olamide	—N/a	
