= NotJustOk =

Nigerian music download website

NotjustOk
- logo of NotjustOk 2023

- Screenshot
- Website type: Music website
- Available in: English
- Owner: Ademola Ogundele
- Editors: Ademola Ogundele; Ovie Ofugara; Seyifunmi Akinrinmade; Oluwafemi Adebanjo; Eghosa Omoregie; Boye Akindolire; Ikenna Okpalor; Peter Okhide
- Website: notjustok.com
- Commercial: Yes
- Registration: Optional
- Launched: 7 June 2006
- Current status: Active

NotjustOk is an African media and entertainment company, known for housing an online music and entertainment website NotJustOk, a music streaming service Mino Music (previously known as MyNotjustOk), and a music distribution and publishing service NotjustOk Distribution, with its media house located in Lagos, Nigeria, and Atlanta, Georgia. There are two different feeds of NotJustOk website; for West Africa, and East Africa. The company and its divisions are led by its Founder and chief executive officer.

== History ==
Coined from Seth Godin's book Purple Cow: Transform Your Business by Being Remarkable, NotJustOk was started as a personal blog by Ademola Ogundele on 7 June 2006. With over 1.2 million viewers per month, from 183 countries, it is one of the most visited websites in Nigeria. It evolved into a music website after Ademola posted a clip of 9ice's performance at Nelson Mandela's 90th anniversary concert, which rapidly increased the traffic of the website. Currently with few employees, NotJustOk is managed by Ademola Ogundele and Ovie Ofugara. In 2014, the company launched its mobile application to run on iOS, and Android devices.

== Overview ==
Described as "a revolution in Nigerian music" by Isioma Osaje of YNaija, NotJustOk delivers music and music videos from the hip hop and contemporary music genres. It also allows artists to upload their songs to the public through an online platform called MyNotJustOk. The website contributed to the sales of popular music albums, including Superstar by Wizkid, The W Experience by Banky W, C.E.O by Da Grin, and MI 2 by M.I.

NotJustOk was voted the "Best Nigerian Music Website" at the City People Entertainment Awards in 2011, 2012, 2013 and 2014. It was also voted "Blog of The Year" at the 2013 edition of the Nigeria Entertainment Awards. On 1 March 2025, Notjusok introduce The Afrobeats Power Ranking, a monthly report chart for Afrobeats artists, measured from streaming numbers, chart performance, social media influence, and overall industry impact to figure out who's running the game.

== Listicles ==
NotJustOk is known for publishing a monthly listicles on its website, in recognition of the most influential artists in the music industry.

== NotJustOk Music Concert ==
NotjustOk Music Concert is an annual music concert organised by NotJustOk. The first NotJustOk Music Concert was held on 17 December 2011.

== Awards and nominations ==
List of awards and nominations for NotJustOk
Year	Award ceremony	Award description	Result
2011	City People Entertainment Awards	Music Website of the Year	Won
2012	City People Entertainment Awards	Music Website of the Year	Won
2013	2013 Nigeria Entertainment Awards	Blog of the Year	Won
2013	City People Entertainment Awards	Music Website of the Year	Won
2014	Black Weblog Award	Best Music Blog	Won
2014	City People Entertainment Awards	Music Website of the Year	Won
