= Aṣa (album) =

2007 debut album by Aṣa

Studio album by Aṣa
- Released: October 16, 2007
- Genres: Indie pop; soul; jazz; reggae; folk; R&B
- Length: 43:27
- Languages: English; Yoruba
- Label: Naïve Records
- Producer: Cobhams Asuquo

Aṣa chronology
| Aṣa (2007) | Live in Paris (2009) |

Singles from Aṣa
- 1. "Fire on the Mountain" Released: 11 February 2008; 2. "Jailer" Released: 12 May 2008

Aṣa is the self-titled debut studio album by French-Nigerian singer Aṣa. It was released on 16 October 2007, via the independent record label Naïve Records. In 2008, the album was made available both physically and digitally in the United Kingdom and across Europe. Aṣa was primarily produced by Cobhams Asuquo, and mastered by Rodolphe Plisson and Jean-Pierre Chalbos. It was supported by the singles "Fire on the Mountain" and "Jailer". Recorded in English and Yoruba, the album is a mixture of indie pop, soul, jazz, reggae, folk, and R&B. Lyrically, it explores themes of personal strength, sensitivity, wisdom, and rebellion.

Music publications such as Nigerian Entertainment Today and the Upper Entertainment called Aṣa a "masterpiece". The album won Album of the Year at The Headies 2008 and was awarded the 2008 Prix Constantin. Aṣa won Best Vocal Performance (Female) and Best Recording of the Year for "Bibanke". The album has sold 400,000 copies worldwide and was ranked eighth on Pulse Nigeria's list of the "top 10 Nigerian debut albums of the past 20 years". Aṣa charted in France, Switzerland, Belgium, and Germany at numbers 15, 65, 81, and 95, respectively. In the United States, the album peaked at number three on the World Albums chart and at 32 on the Heatseekers Albums chart.

== Background and production ==
In the mid-2000s, Aṣa signed a deal with Question Mark Entertainment, a record label founded by Kevin Lucciano-Gabriel. However, she left the label in 2006 alleging that label executives were attempting to sign her to an international contract without her consent. Aṣa was then invited to France for an artistic residency after leaving Question Mark, and met with five record label executives before signing with Naïve Records. Naïve Records released Aṣa's first song "Jailer". In retaliation for her departure, Question Mark released a different version of the song, along with several other songs she had recorded, packaged into the album Down for Me. Question Mark issued Down for Me in 2012, just over a year after the release of Beautiful Imperfection (2010), planning to capitalize on Aṣa's growing success and recover the money they had invested in her career. In a press release, the singer and her management cautioned her followers not to purchase the record and called the label's decision "an act of fraud".

Aṣa was primarily produced by Cobhams Asuquo and mastered by Rodolphe Plisson and Jean-Pierre Chalbos. Christophe Dupouy mixed the album at Le Chantier studio in Montreuil. Aṣa was first introduced to Asuquo by her manager Janet Nwose. The album's cover art is a monochrome image of the singer captured in the middle of a dance, donning dreadlocks and wearing a pair of glasses with her eyes closed.

== Release and promotion ==
Aṣa was released on 16 October 2007, via the independent record label Naïve Records. Its physical and digital release in the United Kingdom and the rest of Europe followed in 2008. The album was later introduced to the U.S. market in January 2009. While promoting the album in the United Kingdom, Aṣa made a television appearance on Later... with Jools Holland in February 2008, and was playlisted on BBC Radio 2 and BBC Radio 1Xtra, as well as taking interviews with Echoes the Voice, Pride Magazine, The Guardian, and Music Week. Moreover, she was approached by MTV to serve as an ambassador for Africa. Aṣa was supported by an extended tour that included stops in Europe, North America, Africa, and Japan. The singer opened for such acts as Akon, John Legend, Beyoncé, and Snoop Dogg. In May 2008, Aṣa performed at London's O2 Academy Islington and Manchester's Club Academy, and played 14 and 15 June dates in Victoria Island, Lagos with her band. The first concert was held at the Civic Centre's Grand Banquet Hall, while the second was held at the Expo Centre. Both concerts marked the singer's debut performances in Nigeria since signing with Naïve Records and Dramatico in 2007. Asuquo made a cameo appearance at both concerts, performing a full set on his grand piano. The concerts were organized by MintMaker Management and High Television.

The album's lead single, "Fire on the Mountain", was released in the United Kingdom on 11 February 2008 and playlisted on BBC Radio 2. The accompanying music video showcases emotive images of people frozen in action; Aṣa can be seen in the video playing a guitar. The singer performed "Fire on the Mountain" at the Nigerian National Petroleum Company's relaunch, which was hosted at the Aso Rock Villa and occurred on 19 July 2022. The second single, "Jailer", was released in the United Kingdom on 12 May 2008. According to Luminate, the song has earned 1.5 million streams in the U.S. and 472,000 worldwide. Aṣa performed acoustic versions of "Fire on the Mountain" and "Jailer" at the 2009 South by Southwest music festival.

== Music and lyrics ==
Recorded in English and Yoruba, Aṣa is a mixture of indie pop, soul, jazz, reggae, folk, and R&B. It explores themes of personal strength, sensitivity, wisdom, and rebellion. The album opens with "Jailer", a protest song about self‑determination and political awareness. Consequence's Alex Young commended Aṣa's songwriting and said the song addresses slavery in a metaphorical manner. Music critic Bomi Anifowose commended the singer's voice on "Bibanke" and said "it melts into the melody like tears on a journal page". Aṣa won Best Vocal Performance (Female) at The Headies 2008 for "Bibanke".

"Subway" alludes to lessons Aṣa learned from her mother. "Fire on the Mountain" is a politically charged song that is fueled by a decadent beat. It features "phoned-in harmonies and glittery programming". On the record, Aṣa addresses societal issues such as pedophilia, rape culture, climate change, and blood diamond. The song was likened to the Young Rascals' single "Groovin'", and contains an eerie imagery exemplified by lyrics like "there is fire on the mountain and no one seems to be on the run". "Eye Adaba" (Yoruba: "Dove"), a ballad recorded entirely in Yoruba, was criticized for being "overwhelmed by an orchestral backing". In contrast, PopDose's Jeff Giles said "Aṣa's brightest moments lie" on the track. BellaNaija's Gbenga Awomodu labeled the song a "solemn, introspective prayer; one of hope and sincere yearning for peace".

The Native's Dennis Peter said "No One Knows" is appropriate for a telenovela. The album closes with "So Beautiful", a song she wrote in appreciation of her mother.

== Critical reception ==
Professional ratings
Review scores
| Source | Rating |
|---|---|
| The Guardian | 3/5 stars |
| PopMatters | 6/10 |

A Nigerian Entertainment Today contributor called Aṣa "a masterpiece", commending the songwriting and composition. Consequence's Alex Young applauded the album for showing an "eclectic artisanship" and said Aṣa's strength "lies in the ability to handle tougher subjects with ease without making light of them". In a review for Urban Central, Asa Lahh considered the album to be a "blueprint for Afro‑soul storytelling, and a source of solace for listeners seeking depth in a world of shallower tunes". Music critic Bomi Anifowose, whose review was published by the Upper Entertainment, called Aṣa a "masterpiece" and an "emancipation proclamation". Anifowose also applauded the singer for setting "herself—and her listeners—free from the prisons of conformity, indifference, and mediocrity".

PopDose's reviewer Jeff Giles felt that the album's tracks, while under delivering on their promise, "do offer hope that future efforts will come closer to the bullseye". The Guardian's Robin Denselow gave the album 3 stars out of 5, praising Aṣa's voice but panned the production. Reviewing for PopMatters, Deanne Sole rated the album 6 out of 10, likening it to rock music that "has a gleam to it". In a less enthusiastic review for the BBC, Tim Nelson acknowledged Aṣa as a skillful singer, but thought her rhetoric was held back by "her (mis)management" and "siren-song of commerce". Aṣa was ranked eighth on Pulse Nigeria's list of the "top 10 Nigerian debut albums of the past 20 years".

=== Accolades ===
| Year | Awards ceremony | Award description(s) | Recipient | Results | Ref. |
|---|---|---|---|---|---|
| 2008 | Prix Constantin | Best Album | Aṣa | Won | |
| 2008 | The Headies | Album of the Year | Aṣa | Won | |
| 2008 | The Headies | Best Recording of the Year | "Bibanke" | Won | |
| 2008 | The Headies | Best Vocal Performance (Female) | Aṣa for "Bibanke" | Won | |
| 2008 | The Headies | Producer of the Year | Cobhams Asuquo for "Bibanke" | Won | |
| 2008 | The Headies | Best Music Video | "Fire on the Mountain" | Nominated | —N/a |
| 2008 | Nigeria Entertainment Awards | Best Album of the Year | Aṣa | Won | |

== Commercial performance ==
Aṣa has sold 400,000 copies worldwide. In the United States, the album peaked at number three on the World Albums chart and at 32 on the Heatseekers Albums chart. It spent seven weeks on the former and only one week on the latter. In the United Kingdom, Aṣa peaked at number 34 on the Independent Albums chart. It also charted in France, Switzerland, Belgium, and Germany at numbers 15, 65, 81, and 95, respectively.

== Track listing ==
Aṣa – Standard edition
| No. | Title | Writer(s) | Producer(s) | Length |
|---|---|---|---|---|
| 1. | "Jailer" | Bukola Elemide; Cobhams Asuquo | Asuquo | 4:07 |
| 2. | "360°" | Elemide | Asuquo | 3:31 |
| 3. | "Bibanke" | Elemide | Asuquo | 4:15 |
| 4. | "Subway" | Elemide; Asuquo | Asuquo | 4:41 |
| 5. | "Fire on the Mountain" | Asuquo | Asuquo | 4:40 |
| 6. | "Eye Adaba" | Elemide | Asuquo | 5:14 |
| 7. | "No One Knows" | Elemide; Asuquo | Asuquo | 3:33 |
| 8. | "Awe" | Elemide | Asuquo | 5:14 |
| 9. | "Peace" | Elemide | Asuquo | 3:09 |
| 10. | "So Beautiful" | Elemide | Asuquo | 5:00 |
| Total length: | | | | 43:27 |

Aṣa – Bonus tracks
| No. | Title | Writer(s) | Producer(s) | Length |
|---|---|---|---|---|
| 11. | "Iba" | Elemide | Benjamin Constant | 3:41 |
| Total length: | | | | 47:00 |

Aṣa – Deluxe edition
| No. | Title | Writer(s) | Producer(s) | Length |
|---|---|---|---|---|
| 12. | "360° (Acoustic Live in Tokyo)" | Elemide | Asuquo | 4:46 |
| 13. | "Bibanke (Acoustic Live in Tokyo)" | Elemide | Asuquo | 5:55 |
| 14. | "Fire on the Mountain (Acoustic Live in Tokyo)" | Elemide | Asuquo | 5:46 |
| 15. | "No One Knows (Acoustic Live in Tokyo)" | Elemide | Asuquo | 3:43 |
| 16. | "Jailer (Acoustic Live in Tokyo)" | Elemide | Asuquo | 4:21 |
| Total length: | | | | 71:00 |

== Personnel ==
Credits adapted from All Music and MusicBrainz.

- Bukola Elemide – vocals (all tracks), writing (tracks 1–4, 6–10), backing vocals (tracks 1–3, 5–10)
- Cobhams Asuquo – production (all tracks), acoustic guitar (track 6), strings arrangement (tracks 3, 4, 6, 8), writing (track 5), backing vocals (tracks 1–6, 7, 8), programming (tracks 1, 2, 4, 7, 9)
- Benjamin Constant – additional production, arranger, audio production, programming, strings arrangement (tracks 3, 4, 6–8), additional mixing (tracks 2, 5)
- Sébastien Viguier – engineer, audio engineer, arranger, audio production, mixing, additional mixing (tracks 2, 5)
- Michaël Ohayon – acoustic guitar (tracks: 2, 4, 7, 8, 10)
- Marie Audigier – executive producer, A&R
- Janet Nowse – backing vocals (tracks 1–3, 5–7, 9)
- Laurent Vernerey – bass (tracks 2, 8–10), double bass (tracks 3, 6)
- Emmanuelle Cohen – cello (tracks 3, 4, 6–8)
- Nadine Pierre – cello (tracks 3, 4, 6–8)
- Régis Cecarelli – drums (tracks 3, 8, 9)
- Pascal Danaë – guitar (tracks 2, 4, 6, 8, 10)
- Rodolphe Plisson – mastering
- Jean-Pierre Chalbos – mastering
- Magic Malik – flute
- Boffi – drums, percussion
- Christophe Dupouy – engineer, audio engineer, string engineer, mixing (tracks 1, 3, 4, 6–10)
- Renaud Letang – mixing
- Benoît Peverelli – photography
- Françoise Gneri – alto, viola (tracks 3, 4, 6–8)
- Jean-Paul Minali-Bella – alto, viola (tracks 3, 4, 6–8)
- Ayako Tanaka – violin (tracks 3, 4, 6–8)
- Caroline Lasfargues – violin (tracks 3, 4, 6–8)
- Lyodoh Kaneko – violin (tracks 3, 4, 6–8)
- Virginie Buscail – violin (tracks: 3, 4, 6 to 8)
- François Galinier – artwork
- Stéphanie Joly – stylist

== Charts ==
| Chart | Peak position |
|---|---|
| Belgian Albums (Ultratop Wallonia) | 81 |
| French Albums (SNEP) | 15 |
| German Albums (Offizielle Top 100) | 95 |
| Swiss Albums (Schweizer Hitparade) | 65 |
| UK Independent Albums (OCC) | 34 |
| US Heatseekers Albums (Billboard) | 32 |
| US World Albums (Billboard) | 3 |

== Release history ==
| Region | Date | Format | Label | Catalogue no. | Ref. |
|---|---|---|---|---|---|
| France | 16 October 2007 | CD | Naive Records | WN145125 | |
| Japan | 17 February 2008 | CD | Plankton | VIVO-344 | |
| Various | 20 October 2008 | Digital download | Naive Records | —N/a | |
| Germany | 31 October 2008 | CD, DVD | Naive Records | NV816011 | |
| United States | 27 January 2009 | CD | Downtown Records | DWT70050 | |
