= Oya Dancia =

Single by Olu Maintain
- Released: February 2014
- Recorded: 2013–2014
- Genre: Afrobeats, Afropop
- Length: 4:30
- Label: Kentro World; Def Jam Recordings
- Songwriter: Olumide Maintain
- Producer: Tayo Adeyemi

Olu Maintain singles chronology
"'Nawti'" (2012)	"Oya Dancia" (2014)

Oya Dancia is a song by Nigerian recording artist, Olu Maintain. It was officially released in February 2014 from his debut album, Chosen One. The song was recorded in Nigeria and produced by Tayo Adeyemi, a Nigerian music producer that produced Yahooze "Hypnotize me" and Yahooze.

== Track listing ==
Digital single

No.	Title	Writer(s)	Producer(s)	Length
1.	"Oya Dancia"	Olu Maintain	Tayo Adeyemi	4:30

== Release history ==
Country	Date	Format	Label
Nigeria	February 2014	Digital download	Reloaded Records
