= Beautiful Imperfection =

Studio album by Aṣa
- Released: October 15, 2010
- Genres: Pop; soul; reggae
- Length: 57:00
- Languages: English; Yoruba
- Label: Naïve Records
- Producer: Benjamin Constant

Aṣa chronology
| Live in Paris (2009) | Beautiful Imperfection (2010) | Bed of Stone (2014) |

Singles from Beautiful Imperfection
- 1. "Be My Man" Released: September 27, 2010; 2. "Why Can't We" Released: October 15, 2010; 3. "The Way I Feel" Released: December 4, 2012

Beautiful Imperfection is the second studio album by French-Nigerian singer Aṣa. It was released as a digital download on October 15, 2010, via the independent record label Naïve Records. Recorded in English and Yoruba, Beautiful Imperfection comprises twelve songs and includes two bonus tracks. It was produced and engineered entirely by Benjamin Constant. A blend of pop, soul and reggae, the album explores themes of humour and love. Beautiful Imperfection was supported by the singles "Be My Man", "Why Can't We", and "The Way I Feel". It received positive reviews from music critics, who praised Aṣa's vocals.

Beautiful Imperfection was nominated for Album of the Year and Best R&B/Pop Album at The Headies 2011. It was also nominated for Best Album of the Year at the 2011 Nigeria Entertainment Awards. The album peaked at number three on the Billboard World Albums Chart and at number six on both the UK Jazz & Blues Albums Chart and the UK Independent Album Breakers Chart. It also charted in France, Belgium, Switzerland, and Spain. The album was supported by a tour that included stops in South Africa, Brazil, and Belgium.

== Background and promotion ==
Aṣa's eponymous debut album, Aṣa, which was released in 2007, comprises ten tracks. Beautiful Imperfection delves into topics of humour and love. It is more upbeat than her debut album, Asa, which explored socio-political themes. The album was produced and engineered entirely by Benjamin Constant. It was largely written by Aṣa, with assistance from Nicolas Mollard, Omolara Ayodélé, and Cobhams Asuquo. Aṣa disclosed that she wrote the bulk of the album's songs in her studio. She recorded the album because she wanted to create music that would inspire others. Aṣa decided to name the album Beautiful Imperfection because she believes that the "world has many imperfections, but in many ways, that's what makes it beautiful. And I think that as long as we accept that it is imperfect, it will make us strive to try and make it a better place." A picture of Aṣa taken by French fashion photographer Jean-Baptiste Mondino serves as the album's cover art. Aṣa is shown on the cover wearing her natural hair, a hat, a neckpiece, and a pair of glasses with a cracked lens. According to music critic Motolani Alake, the album's title is reflected in its cover art.

Beautiful Imperfection was physically released in France, Nigeria, and South Africa on October 25, 2010. It was originally made available as a digital download on iTunes before being physically distributed in other European markets in November 2010. In the US, Canada, and Australia, the album was physically released on September 5, 2011. Aṣa promoted the album's U.S. release by playing acoustic gigs in New York and Los Angeles in June of that year. Beautiful Imperfection was further promoted in the U.S. by several retail outlets, including Gap Inc., Old Navy and Forever 21. Aṣa embarked on a tour to promote the album, stopping in South Africa, Brazil, and Belgium. She also played at the Montreux Jazz Festival and appeared on CNN's African Voices. Aṣa was featured in the January issue of Y! magazine, the June issue of Victoire, and the December issue of Elle Brazil. Aṣa performed "Be My Man" at the 2011 Victories of Music ceremony, which occurred on 1 March at the Paris Congress Centre.

=== Singles ===
The album's lead single, "Be My Man", was released on September 27, 2010. The song peaked at number 18 on the UK Independent Singles Chart and at 89 on the French Singles Chart. The accompanying music video for "Be My Man" was directed by Raphaël Frydman and filmed in France. "Be My Man" was nominated for Best Recording of the Year at The Headies 2011. The second single, "Why Can't We", was released on October 15, 2010. The song's music video features a technicolour background and is set in the 1980s. In the video, Aṣa attends a dance party with multi-coloured balloons. The third single, "The Way I Feel", was released on December 4, 2012, along with its music video. Aṣa plays the role of a hospital nurse in the video.

== Music and lyrics ==
Recorded in English and Yoruba, Beautiful Imperfection is a blend of pop, soul and reggae. The album's opening track, "Why Can't We", is a love ballad with a catchy chorus, positive lines, and a reggae-like acoustic guitar strum. Pulse Nigeria's Motolani Alake commended Aṣa for introducing the song in the first person and talking about society as a whole. "Maybe" makes references to mistrust, politics, and terrorism. Aṣa's uncertainty about the song's subject matter is exemplified by lyrics like "maybe the sun will shine, maybe… This world is full of pain". PopMatters contributor David Maine called the song "impeccable-fluff" and claimed that the clinking orchestration and catchy beat detract from its intent. The bouncy track "Be My Man" is powered by an electric piano and the trombone instrument. BBC's Fraser McAlpine called the song an impassioned cry for affection. Maine remarked that it sounded like an Amy Winehouse song.

The ballad "Preacher Man" is accompanied by a piano and conveys an intense atmosphere. Maine lauded Aṣa's vocal performance on the track and said the song represents a significant shift for Beautiful Imperfection. Slant Magazine's Jesse Cataldo likened "Preacher Man" to a Dusty Springfield hit and said its authorship is uncertain. "Bimpé", recorded in Yoruba, was labelled a rocky and boisterous track by McAlpine. The Record Collector's Ian Shirley praised the song for combining power chords with Aṣa's expressive vocals. "The Way I Feel" is driven by flutes, jazzy horns, and a menacing bassline. The Guardian's Caroline Sullivan called the song a simplified "finger-snapping blues" track. In "Ok Ok", the seventh track, Aṣa comes to terms with the state of affairs. The slide guitar is fused into the production. Maine said the song's lyrics lacked inspiration.

In "Dreamer Girl", Aṣa's hope for a better future is epitomised by lyrics like "maybe someday one day… I dream of simple things every day, I dream that love will come away, I dream of many lives, I dream that in this world I can make a change". The blues track "Oré", which was solely recorded in Yoruba, has a light melody and throaty delivery. Alake said the song explores the detrimental effects of betrayal in interpersonal relationships. The country rock song "Broda Oré" was also performed in Yoruba. On the record, Aṣa confronts a local robber and his partner in a joking manner. On the closing track "Questions", she reflects on her political beliefs. Cataldo characterised the song as a self-righteous track and said it employs "a mixture of hackneyed earnestness and third-world exoticism".

== Critical reception ==
Professional ratings
Aggregate scores
| Source | Rating |
|---|---|
| Metacritic | 62/100 |
Review scores
| Source | Rating |
| Pulse Nigeria | 9.4/10 |
| Female First | 4/5 stars |
| The Guardian | 4/5 stars |
| Slant Magazine | 3/5 stars |
| PopMatters | 6/10 |

Beautiful Imperfection received positive reviews from music critics. According to the review aggregator Metacritic, the album received "generally favorable reviews" based on a weighted average score of 62 out of 100 from 8 critic scores. The Guardian's Caroline Sullivan awarded Beautiful Imperfection 4 stars out of 5, characterising it as "a warm, inviting blend" and saying its "focal point" is the singer's "husky, lightly swinging vocals". Writing for the Record Collector, Ian Shirley described the album as a "work of beautiful perfection" and highlighted "Bimpé" as the standout track. Hannah Gilchristi, a contributor for the magazine Red, called Beautiful Imperfection "an uplifting, soul-snapping must-have for 2011." Female First's Helen Earnshaw granted the album a rating of 4 out of 5, commending Aṣa for remaining loyal to her heritage and sound.

David Maine of PopMatters commended Aṣa for using her voice effectively and making the most of her abilities with well-crafted arrangements. Reviewing for Utne Reader, Will Wlizlo lauded Aṣa's vocal styles and said her overall tone on the record "is both bright-sided and pragmatic." Seattle P-I's Mandy Southgate described Beautiful Imperfection as an "enchanting, uplifting album" and said the audience would be captivated by Aṣa's voice and her perspective on life. Cross Rhythms' Tony Cummings said Aṣa's lyrics are "abound with naïve simplicity" and that her "delicate tones [...] reach out and grab the listener." In a retrospective review for Pulse Nigeria, Motolani Alake rated the album 9.4 out of 10, calling it "a classic" and Aṣa's magnum opus. Alake also labelled the record a "topical enigma" and praised it for conveying meaningful topics that are easy to comprehend.

In a review for the BBC, Fraser McAlpine said the album is "frequently beautiful" despite having "lyrical turmoil in places" and "dark clouds overhead". The Boston Globe correspondent Siddhartha Mitter acknowledged the album for having "uplifting tunes" and said it is "tighter on production and lighter on message." In a review for Slant Magazine, Jesse Cataldo awarded the album 3 stars out of 5, saying it is "routinely safe and unsurprising" despite "sounding disappointingly watery, long on self-assurance and warmth".

=== Accolades ===
Beautiful Imperfection was nominated for Album of the Year and Best R&B/Pop Album at the 6th edition of The Headies. The album was also nominated for Best Album of the Year at the 2011 Nigeria Entertainment Awards. Beautiful Imperfection was selected as the Contemporary World Music Album of the Year by iTunes Music Rewind 2011. Aṣa was nominated for Female Artist of the Year at the 2011 Victoires de la Musique, alongside Vanessa Paradis, Yael Naim, and Coeur de Pirate.

== Chart performance ==
Beautiful Imperfection peaked at number three on the Billboard World Albums Chart in its second week. In the United Kingdom, the album peaked at number six on both the UK Jazz & Blues Albums Chart and the UK Independent Album Breakers Chart. It also peaked at number 22 on the UK Independent Albums Chart. Beautiful Imperfection charted in France, Belgium, Switzerland, and Spain at numbers 14, 35, 54, and 61, respectively.

== Track listing ==
Beautiful Imperfection track listing
| No. | Title | Writer(s) | Producer(s) | Length |
|---|---|---|---|---|
| 1. | "Why Can't We" | Bukola Elemide; Nicolas Mollard | Benjamin Constant | 3:41 |
| 2. | "Maybe" | Elemide; Mollard; Omolara Ayodélé | Constant | 4:15 |
| 3. | "Be My Man" | Elemide; Mollard | Constant | 3:39 |
| 4. | "Preacher Man" | Elemide | Constant | 4:44 |
| 5. | "Bimpé" | Elemide; Mollard | Constant | 3:23 |
| 6. | "The Way I Feel" | Elemide; Cobhams Asuquo | Constant | 4:59 |
| 7. | "Ok Ok" | Elemide; Ayodélé | Constant | 3:51 |
| 8. | "Dreamer Girl" | Elemide; Mollard; Ayodélé | Constant | 3:40 |
| 9. | "Oré" | Elemide; Mollard | Constant | 4:39 |
| 10. | "Baby Gone" | Elemide | Constant | 4:33 |
| 11. | "Broda Olé" | Elemide | Constant | 3:54 |
| 12. | "Questions" | Elemide; Asuquo | Constant | 4:04 |

Beautiful Imperfection – Bonus tracks
| No. | Title | Writer(s) | Length |
|---|---|---|---|
| 13. | "Iba" | Elemide | 3:41 |
| 14. | "Bamidélé" | Elemide | 4:05 |
| Total length: | | | 57:00 |

== Personnel ==
Credits adapted from All Music and MusicBrainz.

- Bukola Elemide – vocals (all tracks), writing (all tracks), acoustic guitar (track 11)
- Benjamin Constant – programming (tracks 2, 6, 8, 11–12), engineering and production (tracks 1–12), bass (track 11), calabash (track 9), clavinet (track 6), flugelhorn (tracks 6, 11), Hammond B3 (tracks 2, 4, 8), mandolin (track 11), weird piano percussion (track 12), piano (tracks 2, 4, 6, 8, 12), rhodes piano (tracks 2, 4, 6, 8, 11–12), arranging (tracks 1–12), horn and strings arranger
- Omolara Ayodélé – writing (tracks 2, 7–8)
- Cobhams Asuquo – writing (tracks 6, 12)
- Tchad Blake – mixing (tracks 1–12)
- Roman Chelminski – acoustic guitar (tracks 4, 7–9), banjo (track 7), electric guitar (tracks 4, 6–11)
- Nicolas Mollard – acoustic guitar (track 2), electric guitar (track 2), slide guitar (track 7), writing (tracks 1–3, 5, 8–9)
- Eric Sauviat – acoustic guitar (track 10), resonator guitar (track 9), slide guitar (track 11)
- Laurent Vernerey – bass (tracks 2, 4, 6–7, 9–10, 12)
- Robin Defives – cello (tracks 7, 9–10)
- Didier Malherbe – duduk (tracks 9, 12)
- Régis Ceccarelli – membranophone (tracks 4, 6–8, 10–11)
- Nicolas Montazaud – percussion (tracks 2, 4, 8–9, 11–12), tabla (track 7), tambourine (track 10)
- Julien Chirol – trombone (tracks 6, 11)
- Julien Gaben – viola (tracks 7, 9–10)
- Jacques Gandard – violin (tracks 7, 9–10)
- Aya Hasegawa-Sabouret – violin (tracks 7, 9–10)
- Janet Nwose – background vocals (track 11)
- Aurélie Ullrich – art direction
- Jean-Baptiste Mondino – photography
- Grande Surface – graphic design
- Bruno Gruel – mastering

== Charts ==
| Chart (2011) | Peak position |
|---|---|
| Belgian Albums (Ultratop Wallonia) | 35 |
| French Albums (SNEP) | 14 |
| Spanish Albums (Promusicae) | 61 |
| Swiss Albums (Schweizer Hitparade) | 54 |
| UK Jazz & Blues Albums (OCC) | 6 |
| UK Independent Album Breakers (OCC) | 6 |
| UK Independent Albums (OCC) | 22 |
| US World Albums (Billboard) | 3 |

== Release history ==
| Region | Date | Format | Label | Catalogue no. | Ref. |
|---|---|---|---|---|---|
| France | October 15, 2010 | Digital download; streaming | Naive Records | —N/a | |
| Switzerland | October 22, 2010 | CD | Naive Records | —N/a | |
| France | October 25, 2010 | CD | Naive Records | NV822111 | |
| Nigeria | October 25, 2010 | CD | Naive Records | —N/a | |
| South Africa | October 25, 2010 | CD | Naive Records | —N/a | |
| Italy | November 1, 2010 | CD | Naive Records | —N/a | |
| Belgium | November 2, 2010 | CD | Naive Records | —N/a | |
| Spain | November 2, 2010 | CD | Naive Records | —N/a | |
| Sweden | November 3, 2010 | CD | Naive Records | —N/a | |
| Denmark | November 5, 2010 | CD | Naive Records | —N/a | |
| Germany | November 5, 2010 | CD | Naive Records | —N/a | |
| Germany | November 5, 2010 | Digital download; streaming | Naive Records | —N/a | |
| United States | April 1, 2011 | Digital download; streaming | Naive Records | —N/a | |
| United Kingdom | April 4, 2011 | CD | Naive Records | NV822111 | |
