= The Headies Award for Best Recording of the Year =

Nigerian music industry award

- Awarded for: The best single recording by an artiste or group in the year under review.
- Country: Nigeria
- Presented by: Hip Hop World Magazine
- First award: 2006
- Final award: 2023
- Website: theheadies.com

The Headies Award for Best Recording of the Year is an award presented at The Headies, a ceremony that was established in 2006 and originally called the Hip Hop World Awards. (Note: The nominees for the 2006 edition are not included in the Recipients table because they are not available.) The Best Recording of the Year is one of six awards not open to public voting. It was first awarded to Lagbaja and Ego's "Never Far Away" in 2006.

== Recipients ==
Best Recording of the Year
Year	Nominees	Result
2024	"Burning" by Tems	Won
2024	"Different Pattern" by Seyi Vibez	Nominated
2024	"Higher" by Burna Boy	Nominated
2024	"Last Heartbreak Song" by Ayra Starr featuring Giveon	Nominated
2024	"Billions" – Sarz featuring Lojay	Nominated
2023	"Soweto" by Victony and Tempoe	Won
2023	"Alone" by Burna Boy	Nominated
2023	"I'm a Mess" by Omah Lay	Nominated
2023	"Ku Lo Sa" by Oxlade	Nominated
2023	"Stand Strong" by Davido featuring the Sunday Service Choir	Nominated
2023	"No Woman, No Cry" by Tems	Nominated
2022	"Celebrate Me" by Patoranking	Won
2022	"Essence" by Wizkid featuring Tems	Nominated
2022	"Joy" by Falana	Nominated
2022	"Loving is Harder" by Johnny Drille	Nominated
2022	"Méjì Méjì" by Brymo	Nominated
2022	"Somebody's Son" by Tiwa Savage featuring Brandy	Nominated
2020	"Ozymandias" by Brymo	Won
2020	"Smile" by Wizkid featuring H.E.R.	Nominated
2020	"Wonderful" by Burna Boy	Nominated
2020	"Dreamer" by Fireboy DML	Nominated
2020	"Ghost Town" by Wurld	Nominated
2019	"Uyo Meyo" by Teni	Won
2019	"Ire" by Adekunle Gold	Nominated
2019	"Heal D World" by Patoranking	Nominated
2019	"Olanrewaju" by Brymo	Nominated
2019	"Ye" by Burna Boy	Nominated
2018	"Joromi" by Simi	Won
2018	"Butterflies" by Omawumi	Nominated
2018	"Halleluyah" by Funbi	Nominated
2018	"Ponmile" by Reminisce	Nominated
2018	"Heaven" by Banky W.	Nominated
2016	"Pray for Me" by Darey featuring the Soweto Gospel Choir	Won
2016	"Emergency" by D'banj	Nominated
2016	"Love Don't Care" by Simi	Nominated
2016	"Orente" by Adekunle Gold	Nominated
2016	"Something Good is Happening"	Nominated
2015	"Wish Me Well" by Timi Dakolo	Won
2015	"Ojuelegba" by Wizkid	Nominated
2015	"Eyo" by Aṣa	Nominated
2015	"There's a Fire" by Bez	Nominated
2015	"Do the Right Thing" by Cobhams Asuquo	Nominated
2014	"Ordinary People" by Cobhams Asuquo	Won
2014	"Iyawo Mi" by Timi Dakolo	Nominated
2014	"Let Somebody Love You" by 2Face Idibia featuring Bridget Kelly	Nominated
2014	"Always on My Mind" by Nosa	Nominated
2013	"This Year" by Jaywon	Won
2013	"I Wish" by Waje	Nominated
2013	"Good Morning" by Brymo	Nominated
2013	"Natural Something" by Sound Sultan	Nominated
2012	"Ara" by Brymo	Won
2012	"Stupid Song" by Bez featuring Praiz	Nominated
2012	"Private Trips" by Wande Coal	Nominated
2012	"I Love You" by Praiz	Nominated
2011	"The Way You Are" by Darey	Won
2011	"God Hand" by Eva	Nominated
2011	"Rain Drops" by 2Face Idibia	Nominated
2011	"Be My Man" by Aṣa	Nominated
2010	"Heaven Please" by Timi Dakolo	Won
2010	"Strong Ting" by Banky W.	Nominated
2010	"I Love U" by P-Square	Nominated
2010	"Keeper of My Dreams" by Lara George	Nominated
2009	"Michelle" by Etcetera	Won
2009	"Street Credibility" by 9ice featuring 2Face Idibia	Nominated
2009	"Not The Girl" by Darey	Nominated
2009	"Can't Do Without You" by 2Face Idibia featuring Melissa Briggs	Nominated
2008	"Bibanke" by Aṣa	Won
2008	"Stylee" by DJ Jimmy Jatt featuring Mode 9, 2Face Idibia, and Elajoe	Nominated
2008	"Greenland" by TY Bello	Nominated
2008	"True Love" by 2Face Idibia	Nominated
2008	"Need Someone" by Faze	Nominated
2007	"Forever" by Paul Play	Won
2007	"Cry" by Mode 9	Nominated
2007	"Onyinye" by Obiwon	Nominated
2007	"Searching" by OJB Jezreel	Nominated
2007	"Streetlife" by Question Mark All Stars	Nominated
2007	"Chinwe Ike" by Resonance	Nominated
2006	"Never Far Away" by Lagbaja and Ego	Won

== Category records ==
Most wins

Rank	1st	2nd
Artist	Brymo	Timi Dakolo; Cobhams Asuquo; Simi; Victony; Paul Play; 2Face Idibia; Aṣa; Teni; Patoranking; Darey
Total wins	2 wins	1 win

Most nominations

Rank	1st	2nd	3rd
Artist	Brymo	2Face Idibia; Burna Boy; Simi; Adekunle Gold	Wizkid; Darey; Timi Dakolo; Patoranking; Omah Lay
Total noms	5 nominations	4 nominations	3 nominations
