= Super Sun =

Studio album by Bez
- Released: July 24, 2011
- Recorded: Lagos, Nigeria
- Genre: Alternative soul
- Length: 57:32
- Label: Cobhams Asuquo Music Production
- Producer: Cobhams Asuquo

Singles from Super Sun
- 1. "That Stupid Song" Released: 2011

Super Sun is the debut studio album by Nigerian alternative soul artist Emmanuel Bezhiwa Idakula, also known as Bez. It was released via Cobhams Asuquo’s label CAMP in July 2011.

Two singles "Stop Pretending" and "Zuciya Daya" (en: Whole Heart) were released through the Hennessy Artistry series platform in 2009. This helped to promote the album, which was eventually released two years later. The album did well in the market, though it was hard to measure sales due to the uniqueness of the industry in Nigeria. However, Universal Music Publishing South Africa has licensed it territorially.

The album's title was chosen as a reflection of Bez's words as he stated "..everybody wants to be a super star, but they've never know what kind they want to be. I want to be The Super Sun, it’s the most unique star that gives warmth, life, energy and light".

== Overview ==
A few years before the album's release, Bez signed a contract with Cobhams Asuquo Music Productions (CAMP) with the help of producer and record label owner Cobhams Asuquo. Afterwards, he was featured as the opening act for international stars such as Aṣa, Angie Stone and Yolanda Adams. Bez also performed at events such as the Lagos Jazz Series, as well as alongside top music acts like Nneka, 2face, Mike Aremu, and South African-based Judith Sephuma.

== Recording ==
Seven songs on the album were mixed by five-time Grammy nominated mixing engineer, Ryan West. He is best known for doing hip-hop and R&B mixes for Rihanna, Eminem, Jay Z, T.I., and Usher. Nicolas Mollard, a well known French guitarist and member of Aṣa’s band, played guitar on the song "Technically". Cobhams Asuquo produced most of the song, while Olaitan Dada assisted on a few of them.

== Release ==
Super Sun was released in 2011, and includes the single "Stupid Song". The Boston Globe placed it at number 3 on its list of World music’s top albums of 2011, calling Bez a "superb alternative-soul singer". Connect Nigeria called it "unusual and just a perfect blend for a debut album"

Super Sun was released digitally on iTunes on 24 July 2011.

== Accolades ==
Super Sun was nominated for Best R&B/Pop Album at the 2012 edition of The Headies.

Year	Awards ceremony	Award description(s)	Results
2012	The Headies	Best R&B/Pop Album	Nominated

== Track listing ==
The following is the album's track listing. All songs were produced by Cobhams Asuquo.

No.	Title	Lyrics	Producer	Length
1.	"Super Sun"	Bez, Omolara Ayodele	Cobhams Asuquo	4:11
2.	"Over You"	Bez, IBK Spaceship boi	Cobhams Asuquo	3:47
3.	"Zuciya Daya"	Bez	Cobhams Asuquo	5:02
4.	"I Know"	Bez, IBK Spaceship boi	Cobhams Asuquo, IBK Spaceship boi	3:50
5.	"Say"	Bez, Blaise, Cobhams Asuquo	Cobhams Asuquo	4:15
6.	"The Good, The Bad, The Ugly"	Bez	Cobhams Asuquo	4:21
7.	"More You (live)"	Bez	Cobhams Asuquo	4:57
8.	"This This This"	Bez, Cobhams Asuquo	Cobhams Asuquo	3:25
9.	"Technically"	Omolara Ayodele	Cobhams Asuquo	3:24
10.	"Stop Pretending (live)"	Bez	Cobhams Asuquo	4:04
11.	"More You"	Bez	Cobhams Asuquo	4:27
12.	"Stronger"	Bez	Cobhams Asuquo	4:24
13.	"Stop Pretending"	Bez	Cobhams Asuquo	4:04
14.	"Super Sun (remix)" (featuring eLDee, Eva Alordiah, and Ice Prince)	Bez, eLDee, Eva Alordiah, Ice Prince	Cobhams Asuquo	4:08
15.	"That Stupid Song" (featuring Praiz)	Bez, Cobhams Asuquo	Cobhams Asuquo	4:13
Total length:				57:32

== Personnel ==
Complete list of personnel include:

- IBK Spaceship boi – Vocals
- Omolara Ayodele – Vocals
- Samuel Onwudo – Drums
- Akinwande Cole – Electric Guitars
- Cobhams Asuquo - Guitars and Keyboards, composer, producer, arranger, vocals
- Bez Idakula – Guitars and Vocals, composer, arranger
- Daniel Oyewole- Bass
- Olaitan Dada – Engineer, Mixing
- Joan Ekpai- Engineer, Mixing
- Enoch – Engineer
- Ryan West – Mixing and Mastering Engineer
- Enyi Omeruah – A&R
- Eva – Vocals
- eLDee – Vocals
- Ice Prince – Vocals
- Nicolas Mollard- Electric Guitars
- Praiz – Vocals
