= Dead Again (disambiguation) =

Dead Again may refer to:

== Film ==
- Dead Again, a 1991 film starring Kenneth Branagh and Emma Thompson
- Dead Again, a South Korean film directed by Dave Silberman

== Television ==
- Dead Again, a 2014-2015 A&E television series with one of the producers being Dick Wolf
- "Dead Again", an episode in the 4th season of television series Kojak
- "Dead Again", a 2002 episode in the 9th season of television series ER
- "Dead Again", a 2003 episode in the first season of television series Wild Card
- "Dead Again", a 2007 episode in the 6th season of television series Crossing Jordan
- "Dead Again", a 2016 episode in the 8th season of television series Castle

== Music ==
- "Dead Again", single on the album Bed of Stone by Aṣa
- Dead Again (Mercyful Fate album), an album by Mercyful Fate
- Dead Again (Type O Negative album), an album by Type O Negative
- "Dead Again", a song by Buckcherry from his debut album Buckcherry
