= Lucid (Aṣa album) =

Studio album by Aṣa
- Released: October 11, 2019
- Genre: Soul; folk; rock
- Length: 47:00
- Label: Wagram; Chapter Two
- Producer: Marlon B

Aṣa chronology
Live in Lagos (2017)	Lucid (2019)	V (2022)

Singles from Lucid
- 1. "The Beginning" Released: May 14, 2019; 2. "Good Thing" Released: June 25, 2019; 3. "My Dear" Released: September 27, 2019

Lucid is the fourth studio album by French-Nigerian singer Aṣa, released on October 11, 2019, via Chapter Two Records and Wagram Music. Labeled a soul, folk, and rock album, Lucid incorporates elements of funk, folk rock, jazz, reggae and neo-soul. Drummer Marlon B was largely in charge of the production.

Lucid employs piano-led ballads, strings, and soft brass to portray a story of the heartbroken. The album's singles "The Beginning", "Good Thing", and "My Dear" were all released in 2019. Lucid received generally positive reviews from music critics, who commended it for being about love. The album was supported by a tour, which commenced in November 2019.

== Background and promotion ==
After releasing Bed of Stone in 2014, Aṣa took a five-year hiatus from music before revealing plans to release Lucid. On France 24, she recalled making an attempt to "live normal" during her hiatus. In September 2019, Aṣa announced the album's title, cover art, and release date simultaneously. In an interview with Griot magazine the following month, she said some of the songs were written in her flat in Paris while others were written at her studio in Lagos. She also said she wrote the album like a diary and poured all of her "joy, heartbreak, laughter and longing" on it.

Lucid's lead single, "The Beginning", was released on May 14, 2019. Aṣa teased the song on Instagram prior to its release. The album's second single, "Good Thing", was released on June 25, 2019. The song's accompanying music video was directed by Sesan and released two months later. The video features two women with vitiligo. On September 27, 2019, Aṣa released the third and final single, "My Dear", along with a live rendition video recorded at Studios Ferber in Paris.

In November 2019, Aṣa embarked on the Lucid album tour. She performed in major cities of France, Germany, and Switzerland. Aṣa was scheduled to headline the Asa Live in Lagos concert, which would have occurred at the Eko Convention Centre on April 11, 2020. However, she ended up canceling the concert and her remaining tour dates due to the COVID-19 pandemic.

== Music and lyrics ==
Composed of fourteen tracks, Lucid is a soul, folk and rock album that incorporates elements of funk, folk rock, jazz, reggae and neo-soul. The record employs piano-led ballads, strings, and soft brass to portray a story of the heartbroken. Pulse Nigeria's Motolani Alake described "The Beginning" as a "lo-fi, melodious post-break-up song that details the residual love still between warring partners". Zama Mdoda of Afropunk.com praised Aṣa's vocal tone and said the song "lifts and uplifts". "Good Thing" features a pop-soul instrumental arrangement. The guitar ballad "Torn" has Aṣa singing of her desire to get revenge after a heartbreak. In the ballad "Happy People", she forgets her problems while enjoying an evening out in the town.

"You and Me" has been described as the "happiest song on the album". "Femi Mo" (English: "Don't Want Me Anymore"), which was performed entirely in Yoruba, addresses the breakup of a long-term relationship. "365" and "Don't Let Me Go" are also about the end of relationships. "Makes No Sense" portrays Aṣa as someone who has been hurt. Leslie Addo of Pop Magazine described "9 Lives" as "a message to Aṣa's former lover on the strength of her character". Logan February said the song "falls short as a formidable statement, but works as a humanistic representation of the damage endured even by the strong". In the closing track to Lucid, "My Dear", Aṣa sings about her absent love interest.

== Critical reception ==
Professional ratings
Review scores
Source	Rating
Pop Magazine	4.5/5 stars
Pulse Nigeria	7.5/10

Lucid was met with generally positive reviews from music critics. Pulse Nigeria's Motolani Alake acknowledged the album for capturing a variety of scenarios and said it is "excellent with new themes". Conversely, Alake believes the album's track listing "fails to promote cohesion" and that its themes lack "sonic uniqueness". Chuks Nwanne from The Guardian said Lucid is "about love in different guises" and praised Aṣa for "amplifying her voice on it".

Leslie Addo of Pop Magazine characterized the album as "a masterpiece and personal diary for anyone dealing with a broken heart" while adding that Aṣa's lyrical delivery will "give you the imaginative powers to transport yourself to another place". Writing for The Lagos Review, Logan February considers Lucid to be Aṣa's "most emotionally robust record yet" and said it "honours the highs and lows of love, and the journey of learning to be alone after the party ends". Culture Custodian's Michael Kolawole described the album as "a whiplash of emotion, a carefully crafted blow to the heart, an end-product of a wizened soul, and a letter of self-discovery". Kolawole also notes that while the album does not break new ground, it is still a "beautiful album that's designed for the brokenhearted".

In a less enthusiastic review, Carl Terver of Praxis Magazine said Aṣa failed to outdo her last offering with the album and that her lyrics have "become weakened by a preference for popular songwriting". Music critic Dami Ajayi, whose review was published by the website This Is Lagos, said Lucid is her "ambitious attempt to collapse the ethos of all her previous albums into a formidable product to keep fans swooning for another half decade".

== Track listing ==
All tracks are written by Bukola Elemide.

No.	Title	Length
1.	"Murder in the USA"	4:03
2.	"The Beginning"	3:44
3.	"Good Thing"	2:49
4.	"Stay Tonight"	3:02
5.	"Torn"	3:23
6.	"Happy People"	3:36
7.	"You and Me"	3:14
8.	"Femi Mo"	3:27
9.	"Makes No Sense"	3:33
10.	"365"	3:19
11.	"Until We Try (This Lo')"	3:19
12.	"9 Lives"	2:59
13.	"Don't Let Me Go"	2:53
14.	"My Dear"	3:56
Total length:		47:00

== Personnel ==
Credits adapted from Aṣa's interview with Griot magazine.

- Bukola Elemide – performer
- Marlon B – producer

== Release history ==
Region	Date	Format	Label	Ref
Various	October 11, 2019	CD; vinyl; digital download; streaming	Chapter Twos; Wagram	
