= Hypnotize Me =

Hypnotize Me may refer to:

- Hypnotize Me (Wang Chung song)
- Hypnotize Me (Olu Maintain song)
