= 1960 (album) =

Studio album by Eva Alordiah
- Released: 13 September 2016
- Recorded: 2012–16
- Length: 55:03
- Label: WOLTRK
- Producer: Tintin; Gray Jon'z

Eva Alordiah chronology
Eva (2014)	1960 (2016)	Because You Been Waiting (2016)

Singles from 1960
- 1. "Deaf" Released: 24 January 2014; 2. "War Coming" Released: 25 September 2014; 3. "Deaf and Dumb" Released: 18 November 2014; 4. "Kanayo" Released: 17 January 2016

1960 is the debut studio album by Nigerian rapper Eva Alordiah. It was released exclusively by WOLTRK Entertainment on 13 September 2016. Postponed numerous times, the album features guest appearances from Yemi Alade, Olamide, Phyno, Reminisce, Sarkodie, Darey, Femi Kuti, and Sir Dauda. Eva worked with producers Gray Jon'z and Tintin to produce the album.

== Background and promotion ==
Following the release of her Gigo EP in 2011, Eva Alordiah began developing her debut studio album, later titled 1960. In a 2014 interview with Pulse Nigeria, she revealed that the project had been in progress for about 18 months and was being produced by Tintin and Gray Jon'z. She stated that the album would contain 14 tracks and include guest appearances from Femi Kuti, Sarkodie, Olamide, Darey, and Yemi Alade. In November 2014, Alordiah announced that the album would be titled 1960 and was initially scheduled for release on 14 January 2015. Ahead of the album, she issued a self-titled EP, Eva, on 20 November 2014 as a free digital release for fans.

Despite multiple announcements, the album experienced several delays. It was first rescheduled for 1 October 2015, but failed to appear on that date after heavy promotion on Alordiah's social media accounts. Another tentative release date of 13 August 2016 was later announced following months of pushbacks. After nearly two years of delays, 1960 was eventually released on 13 September 2016. On the reason for the album's title, Eva explained that she named it 1960 as a reference to Nigeria's independence in 1960, which also marked the birth year of her mother, adding that it symbolized "independence and individuality."

== Singles ==
The album's lead single and only bonus track, "Deaf", was released on 24 January 2014. It was produced by Gray Jon'z and received a nomination for Best Rap Single at The Headies 2014. The second single, "War Coming" featuring Sir Dauda was released on 25 September 2014. Nigerian singer Saeon provided backup vocals for the track. According to Fab Magazine, it is "a song that reminds us that, above all else, we are at war with ourselves." The accompanying music video for "War Coming," directed by Mex, features Eva in traditional attire alongside choreographed cultural dances. The remix of "Deaf", entitled "Deaf and Dumb", was released on 18 November 2014 as 1960's third single. It features Olamide and Sarkodie. The Tintin-produced "Kanayo" featuring Phyno and Reminisce was released as the album's fourth single on 17 January 2016.

== Critical reception ==
Joey Akan of Pulse Nigeria characterized 1960 as "a carefully thought out reaction to a wild, dark and creative mind" that is "both beautiful and harrowing, sometimes difficult to listen, but even more difficult to look away from", awarding it a rating of 4 out of 5 stars. Chiagoziem Onyekwena, in a review for Filterfree, described 1960 as a "deeply personal" and stylistically varied debut centered on "independence and individualism", released through "one of the most imaginative album rollouts you’re ever going to see", and rated it 8.6 out of 10.

== Track listing ==
1960 track listing
No.	Title	Writer(s)	Producer(s)	Length
1.	"That Talking to Myself Bullshit" (intro)	Elohor Eva Alordiah	Gray Jon'z	2:35
2.	"Mbali" (featuring Yemi Alade)	Alordiah; Yemi Alade	Gray Jon'z	3:02
3.	"Deaf and Dumb" (featuring Olamide and Sarkodie)	Alordiah; Olamide Adedeji; Michael Addo	Gray Jon'z	5:09
4.	"For My Momma"	Alordiah	Gray Jon'z	6:05
5.	"Kanayo" (featuring Reminisce and Phyno)	Alordiah; Remilekun Safaru; Chibuzor Azubuike	Tintin	3:58
6.	"Yaba"	Alordiah	Tintin	4:14
7.	"Pretty"	Alordiah	Gray Jon'z	3:28
8.	"Sweet Little Girl"	Alordiah	Gray Jon'z	3:31
9.	"Woman" (featuring Femi Kuti)	Alordiah; Femi Kuti	Tintin	4:35
10.	"Dance with You" (featuring Darey)	Alordiah; Dare Art Alade	Tintin	4:03
11.	"War Coming" (featuring Sir Dauda)	Alordiah; Oluwatobiloba Dawodu	Tintin	3:51
12.	"Tell Me"	Alordiah	Tintin	3:50

Bonus track
No.	Title	Writer(s)	Producer(s)	Length
13.	"Deaf"	Alordiah	Gray Jon'z	3:18
Total length:				55:25

== Personnel ==
- Eva Alordiah — executive producer
- Yinka "Tintin" Olawoye — executive producer, sound engineering, production (tracks 5, 6, 9, 10, 11, 12)
- Jones "Gray Jon'z" Ossai — production (tracks 1, 2, 3, 4, 7, 8, 13)
- Osa7 — album art
- Aham Ibeleme — photography

== Release history ==
Release history and formats for 1960
Region	Date	Format	Label
Various	13 September 2016	CD; digital download; streaming	WOLTRK
