= The Headies Award for Best Vocal Performance (Female) =

Nigerian music industry award

- Awarded for: Individual Female Artiste with the most outstanding vocal performance on a single song or album
- Country: Nigeria
- Presented by: Hip Hop World Magazine
- First award: 2006
- Final award: 2019
- Website: theheadies.com

The Headies Award for Best Vocal Performance (Female) is an award presented at The Headies, a ceremony that was established in 2006 and originally called the Hip Hop World Awards. (Note: The nominees for the 2006 edition are not included in the Recipients table because they are not available.) First presented to Ego in 2006, the category is one of six categories not open to public voting.

== Recipients ==
Best Vocal Performance (Female)
Year	Nominees	Result
2020	Niniola – "Addicted"	Won
2020	Simi – "No Longer Beneficial"	Nominated
2020	Lindsey Abudei – "One on the Outside"	Nominated
2020	J'dess – "Chi Efo"	Nominated
2020	Yemi Alade – "Lai Lai"	Nominated
2020	Imanse – "Ajala"	Nominated
2019	Teni – "Uyo Meyo"	Won
2019	Good Girl LA – "Bless Me"	Nominated
2019	Waje – "Udue"	Nominated
2019	Tems – "Mr Rebel"	Nominated
2019	Falana – "Repeat"	Nominated
2018	Omawumi – "Butterflies"	Won
2018	Waje – "In the Air"	Nominated
2018	Simi – "Gone for Good"	Nominated
2018	Aramide – "Jowo"	Nominated
2018	Niniola – "Saro"	Nominated
2018	Niyola – "Where's the Love" (featuring Adekunle Gold)	Nominated
2016	Simi – "Love Don't Care"	Won
2016	Seyi Shay – "Right Now"	Nominated
2016	Aramide – "Love Me" (featuring Adekunle Gold)	Nominated
2016	Omawumi – "Play Na Play" (featuring Angélique Kidjo)	Nominated
2015	Aramide – "Iwo Nikan"	Won
2015	Waje – "Coco Baby"	Nominated
2015	Simi – "Tiff"	Nominated
2015	Yemi Alade – "Duro Timi"	Nominated
2015	Aṣa – "Bed of Stone"	Nominated
2014	Niyola – "Love to Love You" (featuring Banky W.)	Won
2014	Tiwa Savage – "Wanted"	Nominated
2014	Monica Ogah – "Window"	Nominated
2014	Ruby Gyang – "Good Man"	Nominated
2013	Nikki Laoye – "Only You"	Won
2013	Waje – "I Wish"	Nominated
2013	Niyola – "Toh Bad"	Nominated
2013	Seyi Shay – "Irawo"	Nominated
2013	Zaina – "Totally Yours"	Nominated
2012	Tiwa Savage – "Love Me (3x)"	Won
2012	Chidinma – "Kedike"	Nominated
2012	Ijeoma – "Oloomi"	Nominated
2012	Waje – "Na The Way"	Nominated
2011	Waje – "For a Minute"	Won
2011	Tiwa Savage – "Kele Kele Love"	Nominated
2011	Eva Alordiah – "God Hand"	Nominated
2011	Ego – "Fall In Love"	Nominated
2010	Lara George – "Keeper of My Dreams"	Won
2010	Ibiyemi – "Don't Leave Me"	Nominated
2010	Kefee – "Kokoroko"	Nominated
2010	Waje – "Kolo"	Nominated
2010	Eva Alordiah – "No Cry"	Nominated
2009	Omawumi – "In the Music"	Won
2009	Nikki Laoye – "Never Felt this Way"	Nominated
2009	Waje – "Somewhere"	Nominated
2008	Aṣa - "Bibanke"	Won
2008	TY Bello – "Ekundayo"	Nominated
2008	Kween – "Jebele"	Nominated
2008	Lara George – "Ijoba Orun"	Nominated
2006	Ego – "Never Far Away"	Won

== Category records ==
Most wins

Rank	1st	2nd
Artist	Omawumi	Ego; Aṣa; Lara George; Waje; Tiwa Savage; Nikki Laoye; Niyola; Aramide; Simi; Teni
Total wins	2 Wins	1 win

Most nominations

Rank	1st	2nd	3rd
Artist	Waje	Omawumi; Niyola; Aramide; Simi	Aṣa; Tiwa Savage; Seyi Shay; Eva Alordiah; Nikki Laoye; Ego; Lara George
Total noms	8 nominations	3 nominations	2 nominations
