= Ruggedy Baba =

Studio album by Ruggedman
- Released: March 3, 2007
- Recorded: 2006/2007
- Genre: Afro Hip Hop, Hardcore Rap
- Label: Rugged Records/Blue Pie Productions
- Producer: Ruggedman

Ruggedman chronology
Thy Album Come (2005)	Ruggedy Baba (2007)	Untouchable (2010)

Ruggedy Baba is the second album by Ruggedman, it was released in 2007.

== Accolades ==
Year	Awards ceremony	Award description(s)	Results
2008	Hip Hop World Awards	Best Rap Album	Won

== Track listing ==
1. "Naija Hip Hop 101, Pt 1 (Intro)"
2. "Move Sunthin 4 Me"
3. "Watch Me"
4. "Club Rugged"
5. "World Chart Show (Skit)"
6. "Ruggedy Baba (featuring 9ice)"
7. "My Life"
8. " Ja Rule (Skit)"
9. "Waka"
10. "To Whom It May Concern"
11. "Gangsta #1 (Skit)"
12. "Won't Battle (featuring C'Mion)"
13. "Touched By An Angel"
14. "If I Could Do It All (featuring Niyola)"
15. "Let Me Touch You (featuring George Nathaniel)"
16. "Flesh 2 Flesh ..2 Death"
17. "Broken Promise"
18. "Rock Da Spot (featuring Lord of Ajasa)"
19. "Jusile (featuring Durella)"
20. "Boing Boing (featuring Mr Skillz & Stylo G)"
21. "Naija Hip Hop 101, Pt 2 (Outro)"
