= Gigo =

Gigo may refer to:

== People ==
- Gigo Gabashvili (1862–1936), Georgian painter and educator
- Gigō Funakoshi (1906–1945), Japanese karateka

== Places ==
- Gigo, Central African Republic
- Gigo, Sierra Leone

== Other ==
- Garbage in, garbage out
- The GIGO E.P
