= LKT =

LKT may refer to:

- LKT (tractor) special forestry tractors by LKT holding from Slovakia
- LKT (musician) (born 1984), Nigerian recording artist, songwriter and performer
- Lakota language

== See also ==
- LKT Team Brandenburg, a German cycling team
