= Eva Alordiah =

Nigerian rapper (born 1989)

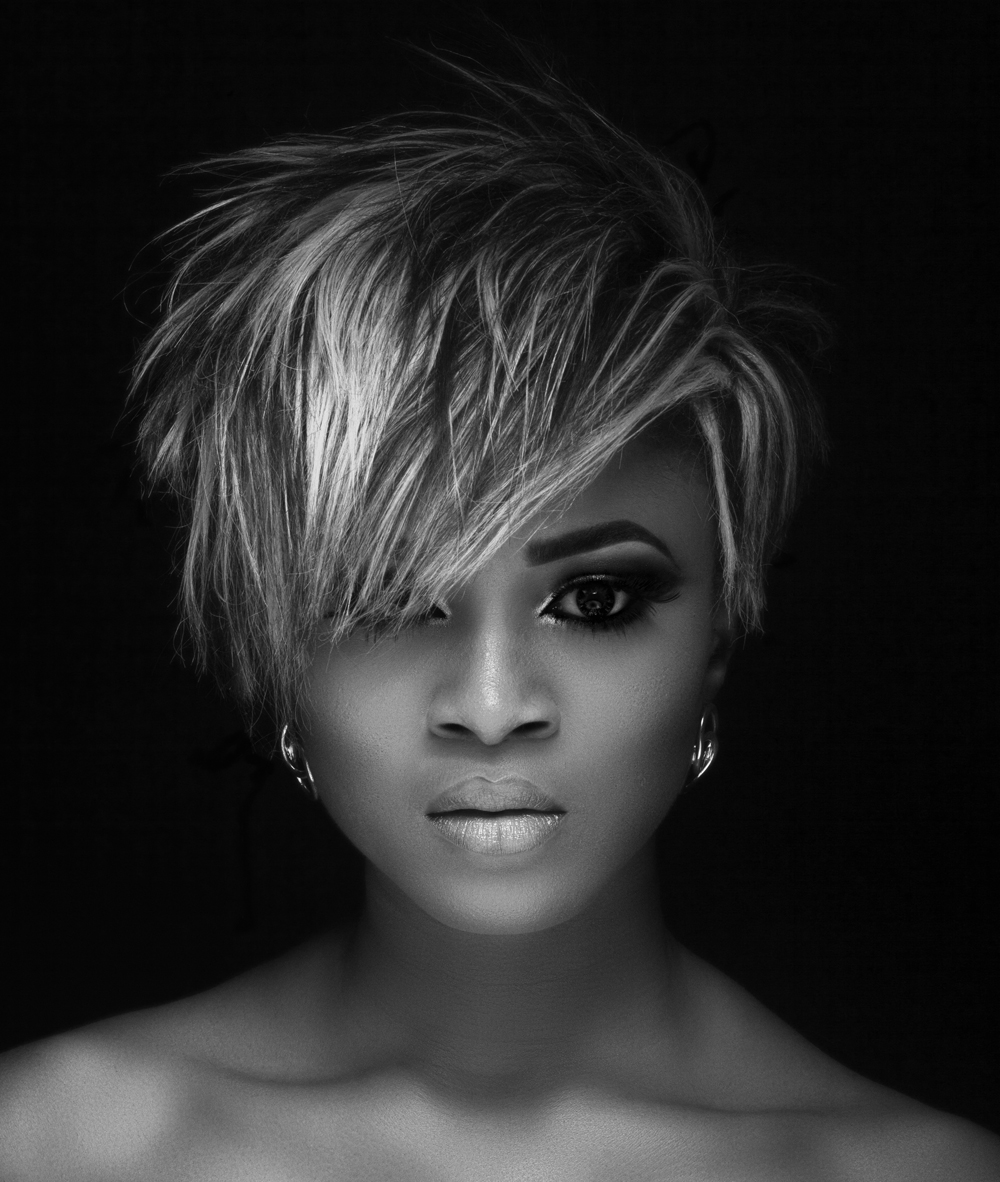
- Alordiah in 2013

Background information
- Born: Elohor Eva Alordiah; 13 August 1989 (age 37); Abuja, Nigeria
- Genres: Hip hop; reggae
- Occupations: Rapper; entrepreneur; make-up artist; fashion designer
- Years active: 2008–present

Elohor Eva Alordiah (born 13 August 1989), better known as Eva Alordiah (or simply Eva), is a Nigerian rapper, make-up artist, and entrepreneur. Her contributions to the Nigerian music industry have earned her several accolades, including one Nigeria Entertainment Award, one Eloy Award, and one YEM award. Eva's debut extended play, Gigo (Garbage in Garbage Out), was released for free digital download on 20 November 2011. She co-founded the platform Kobocourse.com, which hosts courses for African innovators. Eva released her eponymous second extended play, Eva, in November 2014. Her debut studio album, 1960, was released in September 2016.

== Career ==
=== 1989–2009: Early life and career beginnings ===
A native of Delta State, Eva Alordiah was born on 13 August 1989, in Abuja, Nigeria. She was introduced to music by her mother, who listened to musical recordings from the 1970s and 1980s. Eva has cited Michael Jackson, Bob Marley, Sade Adu, The Carpenters, John Lennon and Don Williams as her key musical influences. Growing up, she partook in several forms of art and was fond of drawing and reading books. She joined the theatrical club in secondary school and sang in the choir at her church. When Eva was 10 years old, she wrote a short story in her notebook and dreamt of being an author. After learning of Eminem, she began to write rap verses and was inspired to pursue a professional career in rap music. Eva's love for words and rhyming pulled her deeper into the hip-hop genre.

At the age of 16, she found herself balancing school and business. With an ambition to make money and become independent, she started auditioning for acting and modeling roles. Eva sold second-hand clothing in school as a means to an end, and began her career as a photography model. She graduated with a degree in computer science from Bowen University. Eva's first-ever studio recording, "I Dey Play", was released in 2009. It includes a rap verse by Tha Suspect and was recorded over Lil Wayne's "A Milli" instrumental.

=== 2011–2013: Gigo (Garbage in Garbage Out) and Trybe Records ===
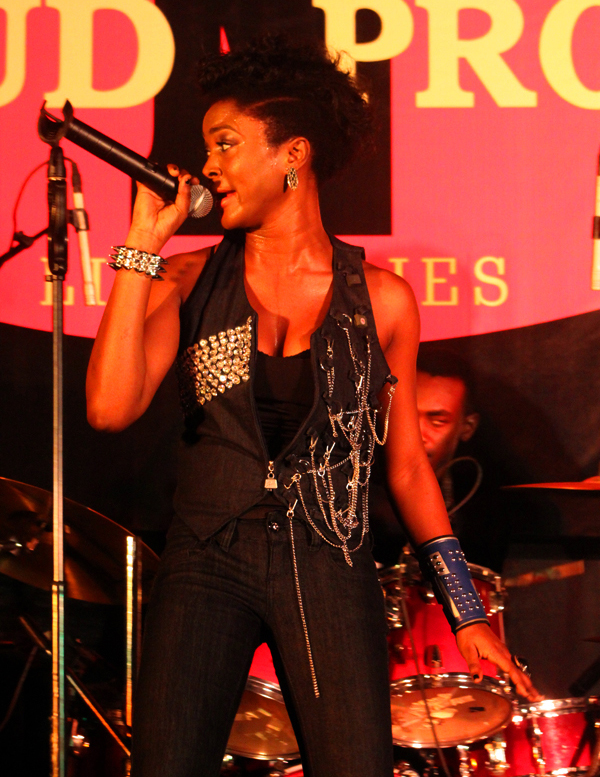
Eva performing in 2012

Eva was featured on Strbuttah's single "Make 'em Say". The Rcube-directed music video for the song was released in January 2011. Two months later, Eva appeared on the female version of Tha Suspect's song "I No Send You", which was released along with its music video. Eva's debut extended play (EP), Gigo (Garbage in Garbage Out), comprises nine tracks and was released on 20 November 2011. It was supported by the singles "I Done Did It", "Down Low", "Garbage Out (Your Fada)", and "High". The EP's production was handled by Sossick, Tintin, and Gray Jon'z. "I Done Did It" was produced by Sossick and released as the lead single. In a 2012 interview with Halley Bondy of MTV Iggy, Eva said she had fun recording the EP and was honored to have worked with the aforementioned producers.

Eva released the second single "High" in 2012. Mex directed the song's music video and released it on 24 May 2012. After the video made its premiere on MTV Base, many people misconstrued the song's meaning and thought that it alluded to drug use. Eva told Bondy that "High" is about overcoming the struggles and hardships of life. That same month, Several media outlets reported that Eva signed a recording contract with Trybe Records, a record label co-founded by eLDee. A year later, Ariya Today reported that Eva was dropped from Trybe Records. According to the press release signed by the label's management, Eva's ideas and foresight didn't align with their plans. In an interview with BellaNaija, Eva denied reports about being signed to Trybe Records despite the press release statement from the label. After the Trybe Records saga in 2012, she took a break from the music scene and spent time reflecting on her craft.

In February 2013, Eva released the single "Mercy", which was produced and co-written by Sossick. The track was made available for download on her blogsite. On 29 July 2013, Eva released the promotional single "Lights Out", which was produced by Gray Jon'z. The music video for the song was directed by Patrick Elis. In an interview with the media outlet Leadership, Eva said she recorded "Lights Out" to showcase her versatility as an artist. The following month, she signed a management deal with Radioactiiv, and was appointed as a judge on Nokia Nigeria's annual Don't Break Da Beat competition. In December that year, U.K producer Drox featured her in the music video for his song "Mercy". He released several official remixes of the song, including a "Summer" mix and a "Jackin Storm" mix.

=== 2014–present: 1960 and Eva ===
On 24 January 2014, Eva released the Gray Jon'z-produced single "Deaf", which serves as the lead single from her debut studio album 1960 (2016). The song was remixed by rapper Boogey and premiered three months after the release of the "Lights Out" video. The music video for "Deaf" was filmed by Patrick Elis. Eva promoted the song by organizing a rap competition exclusively for girls. She said she loves creating visual content and has successfully co-directed all of her music videos to date. Eva was featured in the Lagos edition of BBC Radio 1xtra's Live Lounge, alongside M.I, 2face Idibia, Wizkid and Iyanya. As part of the feature, artists were asked to freestyle. Eva collaborated with Burna Boy, Endia, Yung L, and Sarkodie on an unreleased song that was initially intended to be the theme song for the third season of Shuga. Instead of using the Chopstix-produced song, MTV Base chose the Del B-produced track "Sweet Like Shuga", which features vocals by Flavour N'abania, Sound Sultan, Chidinma, Kcee and Professor. On 11 March 2014, Eva debuted her rendition of the unreleased theme song, which she titled "Shuga".

On 31 August, newspaper Thisday reported that Eva joined Olamide and Phyno as ambassadors for Guinness Nigeria's Made of Black campaign. Eva performed at the campaign's launch and was featured in its television commercial. On 25 September, "War Coming" was released as the second single from 1960. The song was produced by Tintin, who is now known as Focus Ramon, and features guest vocals by Sir Dauda. On 6 November, Eva announced the album's title and said it would be released in January 2015. 1960 features guest collaborations with Darey Art Alade, Femi Kuti, Yemi Alade, Olamide, Sarkodie and Sir Dauda. Sixteen days after announcing the album's title, Eva released her eponymous second extended play, Eva, for free digital download. On 6 March 2015, she premiered the Mex-directed music video for "War Coming".

=== 2026–present: Because You Been Waiting ===
Eva's debut mixtape, Because You Been Waiting, was released on 1 March 2016. It comprises five tracks and contains a sample of DMX's 2000 single "What These Bitches Want". In January 2020, Eva released the Jesse Alordiah-produced single "Friend or Foe" and co-directed the song's music video with Ibukun Williams.

== Discography ==
Studio albums

- 1960 (2016)
- Evarything Good (2022)

EPs

- Gigo (Garbage in Garbage Out) (2011)
- Eva (2014)

Mixtapes

- Because You Been Waiting (2016)

Singles
As lead artist
Title	Year	Album
"Relentless"	2010	Non-album single
"Down Low" (featuring Shank)	2010	Non-album single
"Tonight" (Note: "Tonight" is a tribute to the late Da Grin.)	2010	Non-album single
"I Done Did It"	2011	Gigo (Garbage in Garbage Out)
"High"	2012	Gigo (Garbage in Garbage Out)
"Biggie Biggie"	2012	Non-album single
"Mercy"	2013	Non-album single
"Lights Out"	2013	Non-album single
"Deaf"	2014	Non-album single
"Shuga" (with Burna Boy, Endia, Yung L, and Sarkodie)	2014	Non-album single
"Shuga"	2014	Non-album single
"Friend or Foe"	2019	Single
As featured artist
Title	Year	Album
"I No Send U" (Remix) (Tha Suspect featuring Sasha, Muna, Eva Alordiah, Mo'Cheddah, Blaise, and Zee)	2009	I am Music
"Owo Ati Swagga" (Remix) (CartiAir featuring Gino, Da Grin, Eva Alordiah, and Terry Tha Rapman)	2009	Welcome to My World
"Fido Dido" (DJ Zeez featuring Eva Alordiah)	2012	Non-album single
"Closer" (Omotayo featuring Eva Alordiah)	2013	Non-album single
"Love Letter" (Moses featuring Eva Alordiah)	2013	Non-album single
Cameo appearances
Title	Year	Album
"Ayanfe" (Remix) (Iceberg Slim featuring M.I and Emma Nyra)	2013	Non-album single
Guest appearances
Title	Year	Album
"Shake It Down Low" (P-Square featuring Muna and Eva Alodiah)	2011	The Invasion
"Super Sun" (Remix) (Bez featuring eLDee, Ice Prince, and Eva Alordiah)	2011	Super Sun
Music videos
Title	Year	Director(s)
"I No Send U" (Remix) (Tha Suspect featuring Sasha, Muna, Eva Alordiah, Mo'Cheddah, Blaise, and Zee)	2011	Clarence Peters
"High"	2012	Patrick Elis
"Biggie Biggie"	2012	(Note: An animation video with a Super Mario theme was created for "Biggie Biggie".)
"Lights Out"	2013	Patrick Elis
"Closer" (Omotayo featuring Eva Alordiah)	2013	Tomi Shift
"Mercy" (Drox featuring Eva Alordiah)	2013	—N/a (Note: The music video for "Mercy" was filmed in Lagos and edited in London and Paris.)
"Deaf"	2014	Patrick Elis
"Shuga"	2014	Mex
"War Coming"	2015	Mex

== Awards and nominations ==
The Headies
Year	Recipient	Award	Result	Ref
2014	"Deaf"	Best Rap Single	Nominated	
2012	Herself	Next Rated	Nominated	
2011	Herself for "God Hand"	Best Vocal Performance (Female)	Nominated	
2011	"God Hand"	Best Recording of the Year	Nominated	
2010	Herself for "No Cry"	Best Vocal Performance (Female)	Nominated	
Nigeria Entertainment Awards
Year	Recipient	Award	Result	Ref
2012	Herself	Best Rap Act of the Year	Nominated	
2012	Herself	Most Promising Act to Watch	Won	
2011	Herself	Best Rap Act of the Year	Nominated	
2010	Herself	Best Soul/Neo Act of the Year	Nominated	
2014	Herself	Female Artist of the Year	Nominated	
2014	Herself	Best Rap Act of the Year	Nominated	
Eloy Awards
Year	Recipient	Award	Result	Ref
2011	Herself	Female Rap Artiste of the Year	Won	
YEM Awards
Year	Recipient	Award	Result	Ref
2012	Herself	Artiste of the Year (Female)	Nominated	
2012	"I Don Did It"	Best Rap Single (Female)	Won	
Dynamix All Youth Awards
Year	Recipient	Award	Result	Ref
2012	Herself	Promising Artist	Nominated	
