= V (Aṣa album) =

Studio album by Aṣa
- Released: February 25, 2022
- Genre: Afrobeats; Afropop; R&B
- Length: 30:00
- Label: Rue 11
- Producer: P.Priime

Aṣa chronology
Lucid (2019)	V (2022)

Singles from V
- 1. "Mayana" Released: December 3, 2021; 2. "Ocean" Released: February 18, 2022

V is the fifth studio album by French-Nigerian singer Aṣa. It was released by the distribution company Rue 11 on February 25, 2022. Described as an Afro-infused album, V explores themes of love, friendship, romance, broken promises, and trust. It was the first album that Aṣa has recorded entirely in Nigeria and her first project that includes guest performers. Musically, V is an Afrobeats, Afropop, and R&B album. It comprises ten tracks and was supported by the singles "Mayana" and "Ocean". The album was largely produced by P.Priime and features collaborations with The Cavemen, Amaarae, and Wizkid. V received positive reviews from music critics, who called it cohesive and acknowledged its experimental nature.

== Background and recording ==
V was the first album that Aṣa has recorded entirely in Nigeria and her first project that includes guest performers. In December 2021, Aṣa disclosed the album's title while being interviewed by Ebuka Obi-Uchendu. V features collaborations with The Cavemen, Amaarae, and Wizkid. In an interview with Billboard magazine, Aṣa said she learned to follow her instincts while working with guest acts. She told Al Jazeera that she desired a new interpretation of Afrobeats and wanted to explore musical styles with an Afrocentric flair. Aṣa called V an introspective album and a "different vibe", recorded with "tears, laughter, and joy". The album incorporates untapped facets of her personality that were not present in any of her previous recordings.

Aṣa utilized a straightforward approach to writing and did not worry about lyrics. She started recording V after canceling the European leg of her Lucid tour and returning to Lagos during the COVID-19 pandemic. She revealed to Clash magazine that returning to Lagos was a "coming home experience" for her. In order to cooperate and produce music, she gathered a number of artists to her studio. Aṣa said recording in her living room was always her dream and that she had the flexibility to write and work at her own pace. P.Priime, who produced nine of the album's ten tracks, was Aṣa's main collaborator on V. He told Al Jazeera that a majority of their collaborations started with the instruments.

=== Singles ===
The lead single, "Mayana", was released on December 3, 2021, along with its music video. The accompanying music video for "Mayana" was filmed in Ghana by Meji Alabi. The second single, "Ocean", was released on February 18, 2022. The music video for the song was also directed by Alabi, who filmed it at a beach.

== Music and lyrics ==
V is an Afrobeats, Afropop, and R&B album. It comprises ten tracks and has been described as an Afro-infused record. The album explores themes of love, friendship, romance, broken promises, and trust. V opens with "Mayana", a love ballad that is inspired by a feeling of warmth. On the record, Aṣa imagines herself and her partner living on an island and describes the track as a "cool vibey love song". In "Ocean", she is cautious of her love interest and compares him to the ocean. Singer WurlD performed background vocals on the track. The Wizkid-assisted track "IDG" was labeled "funky" and is driven by an Afro-fusion instrumental. In "Nike", Aṣa sings in Nigerian Pidgin and discusses heartbreak and betrayal. The track "Show Me Off" was likened to her 2010 single "Be My Man".

In "Morning Man", Aṣa yearns for her significant other. The mid-tempo track "Good Times" honors a capella rhythms, South African music, and the fortitude of COVID survivors. The song features vocals from highlife duo The Cavemen. There are "claps, synths, and tangoes" in the house song "Believer"; Rolling Stone's Mankaprr Conteh said the song "finds a stirring balance between serenity and danceability". The Amaarae-assisted track "All I Ever Wanted" was described as a cross between R&B and hip-hop. An unnamed writer for The Native called it the most experimental song on the album and said it "manages to capture Aṣa's fluid expressionism across genres".

== Critical reception ==
Professional ratings
Review scores
Source	Rating
Afrocritik	8.5/10
The Native	8.0/10
Pulse Nigeria	7.7/10

V received positive reviews from music critics. Writing for The Lagos Review, music critic Dami Ajayi considered V to be Aṣa's "most experimental work yet" and commended P.Priime for giving the singer the "much-needed seismic shift to her sound". Culture Custodian's Michael Aromolaran also called V an experimental album and acknowledged Aṣa for stepping outside of her comfort zone and attempting something novel. Conversely, Aromolaran said none of the album's songs "seize the day" and that the record is not a "remarkable outing" nor "familiar territory" for Aṣa.

Afrocritik's Chinonso Ihekire rated the album 8.5 out of 10, calling it cohesive. Ihekire also said the album is not "for stoic-minded individuals that will groan over the sonic switch, but for music lovers that will appreciate the versatility". A contributor for The Native magazine commended the singing and writing on V and considers both to be "a brilliant fusion of Aṣa's soul music and the cadence of Nigerian pop". Motolani Alake of Pulse Nigeria awarded the album a rating of 7.7 out of 10, labeling it a cohesive record and saying it "might be her most important album". Music critic Agwuma Kingsley, whose review was published by Vanguard newspaper, said V primarily dwells on love and is connected to Nigeria's expanding market and changing musical landscape.

== Track listing ==
No.	Title	Writer(s)	Producer(s)	Length
1.	"Mayana"	Elemide; Peace Oredope	P.Priime	2:38
2.	"Ocean"	Elemide; Oredope; Sadiq Onifade	P.Priime	3:10
3.	"IDG" (featuring Wizkid)	Elemide; Austin Iwar; Ayodeji Balogun; Oredope	P.Priime	3:07
4.	"Nike"	Elemide; Oredope	P.Priime	2:57
5.	"Show Me Off"	Elemide; Oredope	P.Priime	3:17
6.	"Morning Man"	Elemide; Oredope	P.Priime	2:29
7.	"Good Times" (featuring The Cavemen)	Elemide; Benjamin James; Kingsley Okorie	Kingsley Okorie	3:43
8.	"Believer"	Elemide; Oredope; Ben Samama	P.Priime	2:41
9.	"All I Ever Wanted" (featuring Amaarae)	Elemide; Oredope; Ama Genfi	P.Priime	2:57
10.	"Love Me or Give Me Red Wine"	Elemide; Oredope	P.Priime	3:42
