= Monica Ogah =

Nigerian singer

- Born: Monica Ene Ogah; August 7, 1994 (age 32); Makurdi, Benue State, Nigeria
- Origin: Otukpo, Nigeria
- Genres: R&B, soul, pop, highlife
- Occupations: Singer, songwriter
- Instrument: Vocals
- Years active: 2011–present
- Labels: Ultima Studios, Goretti Company

Monica Ene Ogah // (born August 7, 1994), commonly known as Monica Ogah, is a Nigerian singer, the 2011 winner of the fourth edition of MTN Project Fame West Africa. As prize, Ogah was given a record deal and her first album, Sometime in August, was released in August 2013.

== Early life ==
The youngest of six children, Monica Ogah was born on August 7, 1994, in Makurdi, Benue State. She credits her mother, a choir mistress, as one of her earliest influences. She said in an interview with Thisday News: "[Mother] would also remind me of how sweet my voice was when I made those innocent cries which she believed was laced with God's given voice." She further revealed that her father had hoped that she would become a nurse and would not support her musical aspirations until she gained entrance into the Project Fame reality show where she would emerge among popular finalists as the victor.

Ogah's early education was at Bammco Nursery and Primary School. She later attended Methodist Girls' High School in Otukpo, Benue State. Her singing talent was first honed during Sunday school at her childhood church.

== Career ==
Monica Ogah auditioned for the fourth edition of Project Fame West Africa in August 2011. She made it past the audition stage and was among the nineteen contestants to join the music academy. Ogah shined throughout her time on the show, garnering positive comments from the judges, who praised her performance. On December 18, 2011, she was declared the winner, making her the second female after Chidinma to win the competition. As prize for the victory, Ogah received a recording contract with Ultima Studios while being managed by Goretti Company.

In August 2013, two years after her appearance on Project Fame, Ogah released her debut studio album, Sometime in August, which featured collaborations with singers Wizboyy and Chidinma. Contributions to the album's production came from TY Mix, Del B, Silvastone, Wizboyy, J. Sleek and the Suspekt. Her singing style ranges from R&B, pop, and soul to highlife. Preceding its release, the album's lead single "Body Hug" received significant airplay on radio stations across Nigeria and the song's music video, directed by Clarence Peters achieved considerable popularity.

In April 2014, Ogah released an Igbo language love song titled "Obim bu nke gi" which features Harrysongz. The music video accompanying the song was filmed in South Africa.

== Discography ==
=== Studio albums ===
- Sometime in August (2013)

== Awards and nominations ==
Year	Event	Prize	Recipient	Result	Ref
2014	The Headies	Best Vocal Performance (Female)	Herself	Nominated	
