= Thy Album Come =

Studio album by Ruggedman
- Released: 2005
- Recorded: 2004/2005
- Genre: African hip-hop, Hardcore Rap
- Label: Rugged Records
- Producer: Ruggedman

Ruggedman chronology
Thy Album Come (2005)	Ruggedy Baba (2007)

Thy Album Come is the first album by Nigerian rapper Ruggedman, it was released in 2005.

== Track listing ==
1. "Intro" 1:00
2. "Ehen! (Pt.1) (featuring Nomoreloss)" 5:45
3. "Baraje (What U Got)" 5:13
4. "Peace Or War" 4:17
5. "Skit" 00:42
6. "Kokos Song (featuring C'Mion)" 4:16
7. "Where Ya @" 4:21
8. "I Am Ruggedman" 3:52
9. "Big Bros (Skit)" 1:26
10. "Big Bros (Uncensored)" 4:07
11. "Dublin Wit Luv" 4:14
12. "Wetin Dey (featuring Abounce & Jaffar)" 4:55
13. "Rugged And Josh Skit" 00:41
14. "French Connection (featuring Josh Of Tatu Clan (Congo))" 3:33
15. "Outro/Awards" 00:45
16. "Oh Oh [Bonus Track]" 3:38
17. "Ehen (Streetwise Remix) [Bonus Track]" 5:01
