= 3rd Headies Awards =

Nigerian music industry awards

- Date: 15 March 2008
- Location: Planet One, Maryland, Lagos
- Country: Nigeria
- Hosted by: Basketmouth and Dakore Egbuson
- Most awards: Aṣa (3)
- Most nominations: 2 Face Idibia (6)
- Website: theheadies.com

Television/radio coverage
- Network: HipTV

The 3rd Headies Awards, commonly known as the 2008 Hip Hop World Awards, were hosted by comedian Basketmouth and actress Dakore Egbuson. It was held on 15 March 2008, at Planet One in Maryland, Lagos, Nigeria. Nigerian-French singer Aṣa won 3 awards, including Album of the Year for her eponymous debut album. 2face Idibia received the most nominations with six.

== Winners and nominees ==
Winners are emboldened.

Album of the Year	Artiste of the Year
Game Over – P-Square; Grass 2 Grace – 2 Face Idibia; E Pluribus Unum – Mode 9; Aṣa – Aṣa (Winner); Independent – Faze	D'banj (Winner); 2face Idibia; P-Square; Olu Maintain
Song of the Year	Recording Artiste of the Year
"Do Me" – P-Square; "See Me So" – 2Face Idibia; "Kolomental" – Faze; "Yahooze" – Olu Maintain (Winner); "Styllee"' – DJ Jimmy Jatt (featuring 2face, Elajoe & Mode 9)	"Bibanke" – Aṣa (Winner); "Stylee" – DJ Jimmy Jatt; "Greenland" – TY Bello; "True Love" – 2Face Idibia; "Need Someone" – Faze
Producer of the Year	Best Music Video
Cobhams Asuquo – "Bibanke" (Winner); Mosa – "Greenland"; Puffy Tee – "Yahoozee"; OJB Jezreel – See me So; ID Cabasa – "Ruggedy Baba"	"Stylee" – DJ Tee (Winner); "Do Me" – Jude Okoye; "Greenland" – TY Bello & Abbey; "Fire on the Mountain" – COSA; "Adara" – Clarence Peters
Best Reggae/Dancehall Album	Best R&B/Pop Album
Uchie – African Rockstar; True Story – Timaya (Winner); Fever – African China	Grass to Grace – 2Face Idibia (Winner); Independent – Faze; Call my Name – Niyola; Press on Part 2 – Indispensables; Game Over – P-Square
Best Rap Album	Best Collabo
The Definition – DJ Jimmy Jatt; E Pluribus Unum – Mode 9; Ruggedy Baba – Ruggedman (Winner); Tha Rapman Begins – Terry Tha Rapman; First Lady – Sasha P	"Stylee" – Jimmy Jatt, Mode 9, 2Face Idibia & Elajoe (Winner); "Ruggedy Baba" – Ruggedman; "Lorile" – X-Project; "Yahoozey" – Olu Maintain; "Booty Call" – Mo Hits All Stars
Best Rap Single	Best Vocal Performance (Male)
"Crowd Mentality" - M.I (Winner); "Mo" – Rooftop MC; "Stylee" – DJ Jimmy Jatt, Mode 9, 2Face Idibia & Elajoe; "U know my P" – Naeto C	2Face Idibia – "Stylee"; Wande Coal – "Ololufe"; Faze – "Someone like You"; 9ice – "Ruggedy Baba" (Winner)
Best Vocal Performance (Female)	Next Rated
Jebele – Kween; "Bibanke" – Aṣa (Winner); "Ekundayo" – TY Bello; "Ijoba Orun" – Lara George	GT The Guitarman – "Dreamer"; Wande Coal – "Ololufe" (Winner); Banky W – "Ebutte Metta"; M.I – "Crowd Mentality"; Cyrus da Virus – "Very Gbofty"
Hip Hop World Revelation of the Year	African Artiste of The Year
9ice (Winner); Aṣa; TY Bello; Olu Maintain; Sasha P	(Ghana) Batman Samini – "Lambori" (Winner); (South Africa) FreshlyGround- "Pot Belly"; (Kenya) Nameless – "Sinzia"; (South Africa) HHP – "Music & Lights"; (South Africa) Jozi – "What's with the Attitude"
Lyricist on the Roll	Hall of Fame
Terry tha Rapman – "Only 4 Naija"; Mode 9 – "Contradiction" (Winner); M.I – "Crowd Mentalist"; Ruggedman – "Ruggedy Baba"	Obi Asika; Olisa Adibua
