= LKT (musician) =

- Born: Olalekan Tunde Olayade; 5 October 1984 (age 41); Lagos, Nigeria
- Origin: Osun state
- Genres: Afrobeats; afropop; reggae
- Occupations: Recording artist; songwriter; performer
- Years active: 1993–present
- Labels: Current: Punchline Records; Former: Edlyne Records

Olalekan Babatunde Olayade, popularly known by his stage name "LKT" is a Nigerian recording artist, songwriter and performer.

== Music biography ==
LKT began his music career with Fuji music in 1993 but later changed his style of music to hip hop. He rose to prominence in 2007 when he featured in the hit song Yahooze, released by Olu Maintain, a Nigerian hip-hop artiste, lkt made the track a hit due to his fuji style which was sensational at that time. He has a unique talent and he is very versatile when switching from singing hip-hop, reggae and fuji music. In January 2011, he released a song titled "Follow Follow" featuring P-Square and the song was preceded by "Alaye Mi, the remix of the song, which featured Davido was released in March 2012. It was part of his debut album The Journey and had guest appearances from Nigerian singers 9ice, Davido, Jaywon, Kayswitch, Olamide, P-Square and Vector. Since then, LKT has released numerous songs, his latest being "Where you dey" that has also been a hit in the Music Industry.
