= Logan February =

Nigerian poet, singer and songwriter

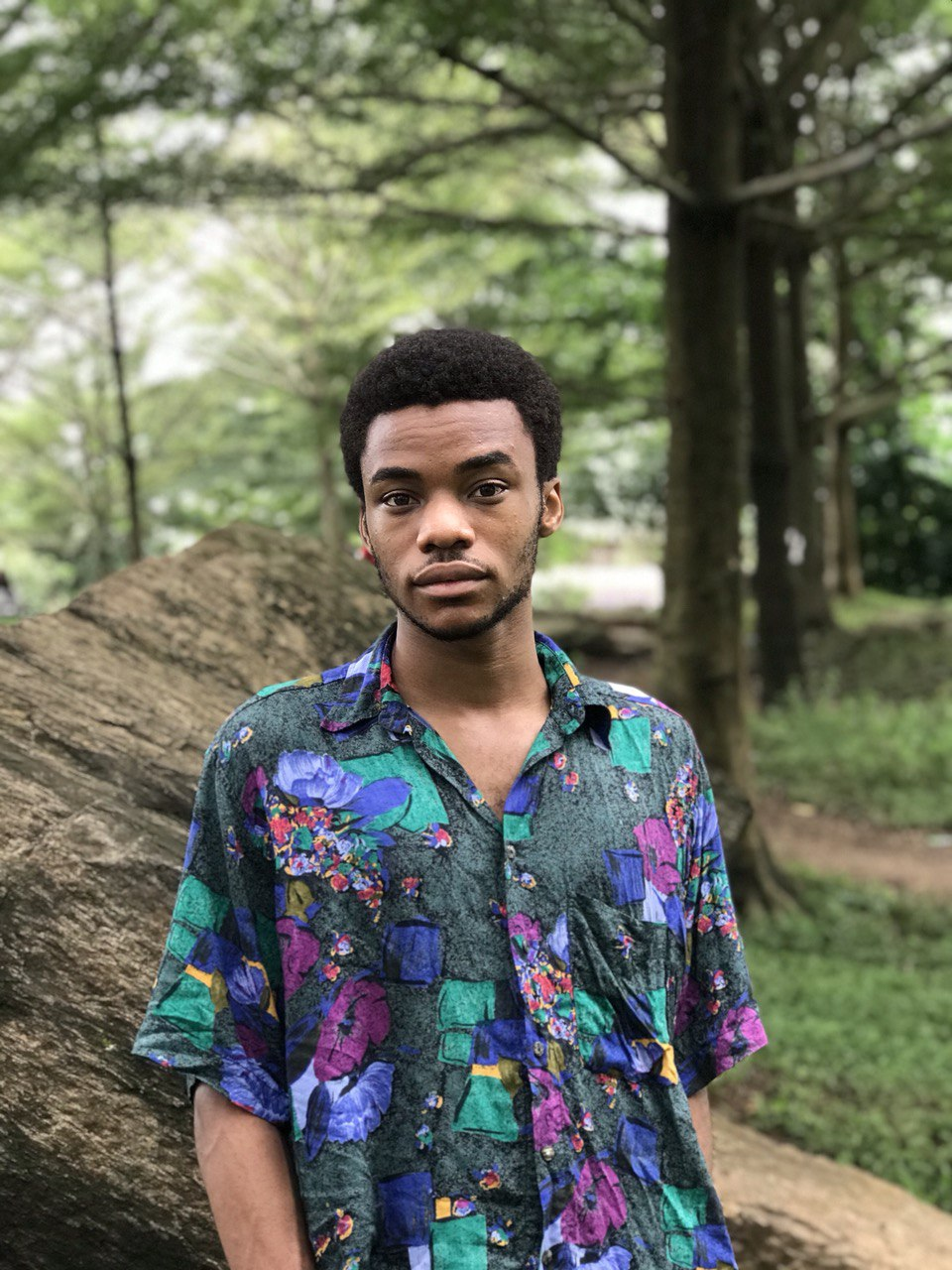
- Born: 23 April 1999 (age 27); Anambra
- Education: University of Ibadan
- Occupations: Poet, LGBTQ activist, singer, songwriter, music reviewer
- Years active: 2016–present
- Known for: Poetry, LGBTQ Activism, and Music review
- Notable work: In the Nude, 2019.
- Website: www.loganfebruary.com

Logan February (born April 23, 1999) is a Nigerian poet, essayist, music reviewer, singer, songwriter, and LGBTQ activist.

== Biography ==
Logan February was born in Anambra state of Nigeria on 23 April 1999, and grew up in Ibadan. Logan studied psychology at the University of Ibadan, and Creative Writing at Purdue University. They are non-binary and use they/them pronouns.

== Works ==
Logan is the author of In the Nude, published in Nigeria by Ouida Poetry, 2019, and as Mannequin in the Nude by PANK Books in the USA. They are also the author of the chapbooks Painted Blue with Saltwater (Indolent Books, 2018). How to Cook a Ghost (Glass Poetry Press, 2017). Logan is a Pushcart and Best of the Net nominee and their poetry collection, Mannequin in the Nude was a finalist for in the 2018 African Poetry Book Fund and was also listed in one of the top fifteen debut book in Nigeria by Brittle Paper.

Logan reviews music for online magazines. In 2017 they were featured on Eri Ife's THE EP. The introduction of THE EP was a poetry performance by Logan and in the track Nobody, Logan sang alongside Eri Ife. Logan released two singles titled Black SUV and Games in 2020.

As an LGBTQ activist in Nigeria, Logan was a guest editor for the "There Is Hope" series during the 2020 Pride month for Ynaija's nonbinary blog.

== Bibliography ==
Books

- How to Cook a Ghost (2017)
- Painted Blue with Saltwater (2018)
- In the Nude (2019)

Anthologies and magazines

- Un_Masking Difference. Literary Voices from Behind the Mask, edited by Natasha A. Kelly (2020)
- Berlin Quarterly, THE THIRTEENTH ISSUE, Winter 2021

== Honors and awards ==
- 2020 — Web Residency at Literarisches Colloquium Berlin
- 2021 — Winner of The Future Awards Africa
