= Lara George =

Nigerian-American gospel singer (born 1978)

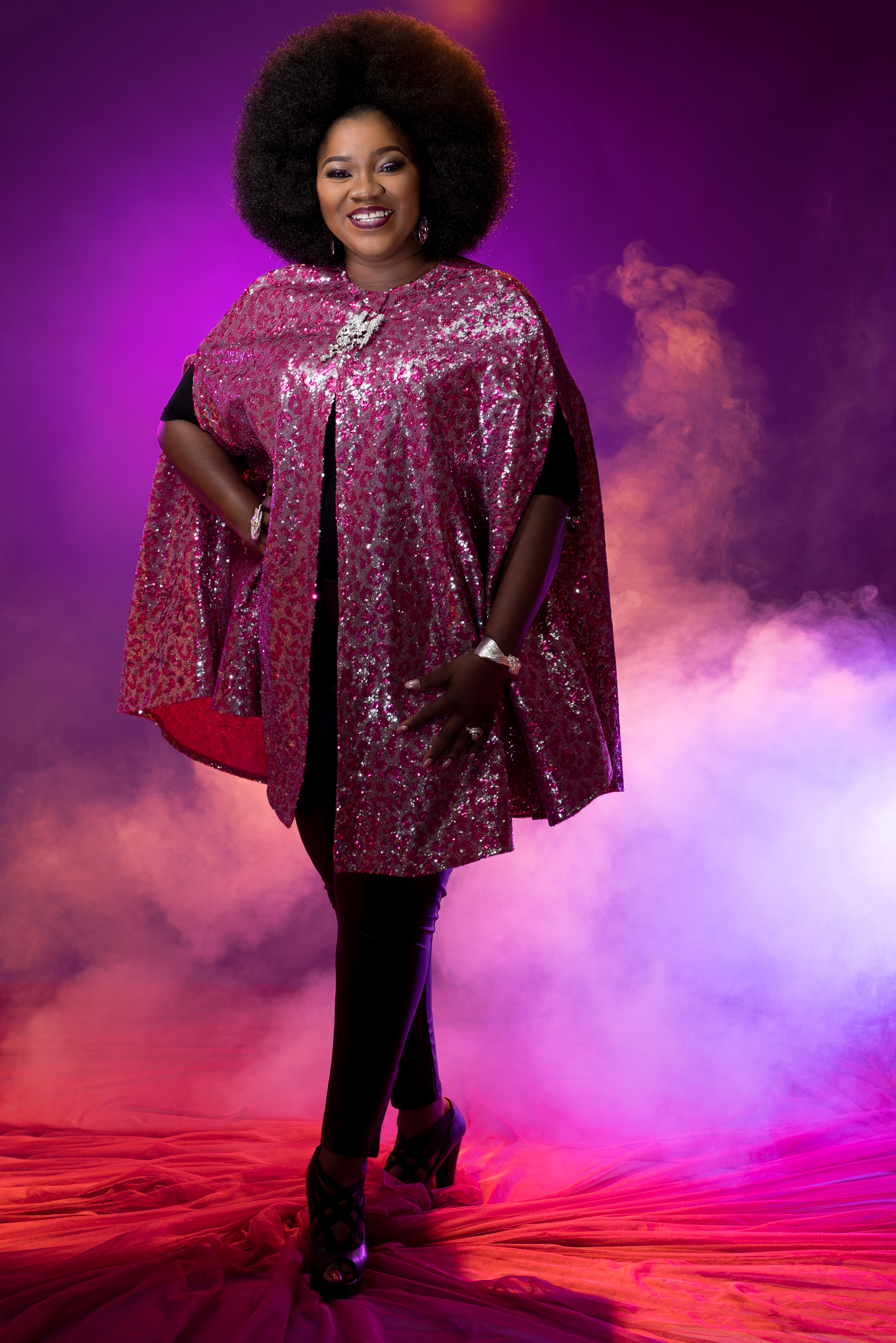
- Lara George in 2014

Background information
- Born: 23 June 1978 (age 48)
- Origin: Lagos State, Nigeria
- Genres: Gospel
- Occupations: Singer; songwriter; producer
- Years active: 1997–present
- Label: Soforte Entertainment

Lara George (born 23 June 1978), known professionally as a US-based Nigerian gospel singer, songwriter and producer. She started her music career at the University of Lagos and was a member of the disbanded musical group Kush. Her debut album Forever In My Heart was released in 2008 and included the hit single "Ijoba Orun," which earned her several awards and nominations. She has performed at notable events and appeared on BET International as one of the first Nigerian artists to be aired on that show. She is married with two children and lives in Alpharetta, Georgia in the United States. Additionally, she is the Vice President of SoForte Entertainment Distribution Ltd., the first home-grown structured entertainment distribution company in Nigeria.

== Early life and education ==
Lara George was born on 23 June 1978 into the family of Oluwole Bajomo in Lagos State, the administrative division of Nigeria. She attended Queen's College, Lagos before proceeding to the University of Lagos, where she obtained a master's degree in architecture.

== Career ==
George began her music career at the University of Lagos, where she joined the campus fellowship choir. She was a member of the disbanded musical group Kush. Her debut album, titled Forever In My Heart, included the hit single "Ijoba Orun" which was released in 2008. The album earned her several awards and nominations. In 2008, she won Voice of the Year at the Nigeria Music Awards. In 2010, she was awarded Best Vocals Performance (Female) in the industry-wide 'Headies' awards, now renamed 'Hip-Hop World Awards' in Nigeria. She emerged the winner of the Best African Female Gospel Artiste category at the 2011 Africa Gospel Music Awards held in London, UK. George has also been named Trailblazer of the Year, Africa Gospel Music Awards, nominated in the 2016 edition of the prestigious pan-African Kora Awards as Best Female Artiste West Africa, and also Gospel Artiste of the Year, Ben TV Awards UK, amongst many other awards.

George has performed in various notable events including the GreenBelt Festival UK (as part of KUSH), one of Africa's largest musical concerts with attendance of over 500,000 people- The Experience- alongside notable gospel artistes such as Ron Kenoly, Bebe, Cece Winans, Micah Stampley, Don Moen and Mary Mary. Other performances include the Calabar Festival, MTN Music Festival, Festival of Life UK, Festival of Life Canada, amongst many others.

George appeared on BET International as one of the first artistes from Nigeria to be aired on that show. She was a member of the BET Voting Academy for two years in a row. She served as a judge on the music TV show Airtel TRACE MUSIC Star.

== Personal life ==
She is married to Gbenga George, a legal practitioner. She has two children. She lives in Alpharetta, Georgia in the United States.

She is vice president of SoForte Entertainment Distribution Ltd., a Nigerian entertainment distribution company.

== Discography ==
=== Albums ===
- Forever In My Heart (2008)
- Lara George (2009)
- Higher - The Dansaki Album (2012)
- Love Nwantintin (2014)
- The Medley Album (2014)
- A Slice of Heaven (2017)
- Daddy's Girl (2021)

=== Singles ===
- You Alone Oluwa Medley (2014)
- Total Surrender (2016)
- Lara George Praise Medley (2016)
- Kolebaje Medley (2016)
- Eyin L'oba (2016)
- Nobody Greater (2016)

=== Covers ===
- "Hello" (Adele cover) (2015)

== Awards and nominations ==
Year	Event	Prize	Result	Ref
2016	KORA Awards	Best Gospel Artiste	Nominated	
2014	BEN TV UK Award	Best Gospel Artiste	Won	
2014	Crystal Awards	Best Female Vocalist	Won	
2013	Africa Gospel Music Awards	Trailblazer of the Year	Won	
2012	Gospel Music Awards	Best African Female Gospel Artiste	Won	
2011	Nigeria Entertainment Awards	Best Gospel Artist	Won	
2010	Nigeria Entertainment Awards	Best Gospel Artist	Won	
2010	The Headies	Best Vocal Performance (Female)	Won	
2010	Nigeria Music Awards	Best Female Vocalist	Won	
2008	The Headies	Best Vocal Performance (Female)	Nominated	

== See also ==
- List of Nigerian gospel musicians
