= Hypnotize Me (Olu Maintain song) =

"Hypnotize me"

Single by Olu Maintain
- Released: January 4, 2013
- Recorded: 2012
- Genre: Afrobeats, Afropop
- Length: 4:34
- Label: Kentro World
- Songwriter: Olumide Maintain
- Producer: Tayo Adeyemi

Olu Maintain singles chronology
"Nawti" (2012)	"Hypnotize me" (2013)

Music video
- "Hypnotize me" on YouTube

"Hypnotize Me" is a song by Nigerian recording artist, Olu Maintain featuring Grammy Award-winning artists 50 Cent and Olivia. It was officially released on January 4, 2013, as the second track from his debut album, Chosen One. The song was recorded in Nigeria and produced by Tayo Adeyemi, a Nigerian music director that directed "Yahooze".

== Release history ==
Country	Date	Format	Label
Nigeria	January 4, 2013	Digital download	Reloaded Records
