= Nawti =

Single by Olu Maintain
- Released: 2012
- Recorded: September 2011
- Genre: Afrobeats, Afropop
- Length: 4:04
- Label: Kentro World
- Songwriter: Olumide Maintain
- Producer: Tayo Adeyemi

Olu Maintain singles chronology
"Yahooze" (2007)	"Nawti" (2012)	"Hypnotize me" (2013)

Music video
- "Yahooze" on YouTube

Nawti is a song by Nigerian recording artist, Olu Maintain. It was officially released in January 2012, as the first single from his debut album, Chosen One. The single was recorded in Nigeria and the video was directed by Kehinde Nayomi Smith, a Nigerian music director. Nawti's video won the Best Video of 2012 Nigeria Entertainment Awards held on September 2, 2012, in New York City and was also nominated as the Best R&B Song at the Hip Hop World Awards. The reason why it was not nominated as Best Video at the "Hip Hop World Awards" was linked to the fact that it was directed by a Nigerian music director.

== Track listing ==
Digital single

No.	Title	Writer(s)	Producer(s)	Length
1.	"Yahooze"	Olu Maintain	Tayo Adeyemi	4:04

== Release history ==
Country	Date	Format	Label
Nigeria	January 2012	Digital download	Reloaded Records
