= David Maine =

American novelist

- Born: November 28, 1963 (age 62); Hartford, Connecticut, U.S.
- Education: Oberlin College; University of Arizona (MFA)
- Occupation: Novelist
- Spouse: Uzma Aslam Khan (m. 1994)

David Maine (born November 28, 1963) is an American novelist.

== Personal life ==
David Maine was born in Hartford, Connecticut, and grew up in Farmington, Connecticut. He attended Oberlin College (1981–1985) and the University of Arizona (1988–1991), where he graduated with a Master's of Fine Arts in creative writing.

Maine relocated to Morocco in 1995 and Pakistan in 1998. He left Pakistan in 2008 and moved to Honolulu, Hawaii, USA, where he lived until 2012. While in Honolulu he taught at the University of Phoenix, Hawai'i Pacific University, and the University of Hawaiʻi at Mānoa. In the fall of 2011 he was invited to be the Distinguished Visiting Writer at the University of Hawaiʻi at Mānoa.

In 2012 he moved to western Massachusetts. In the fall of 2013 he began teaching creative writing at Smith College while working full-time in the human services field.

Since 1994 he has been married to novelist Uzma Aslam Khan.

== Career ==
Early short stories appeared in the literary magazines Other Voices (1991), The Beloit Fiction Journal (1991) and West Branch (1993).

Maine's first novel The Preservationist was published by St. Martin's Press in New York City in 2004, Canongate Books UK in 2005 (under the title The Flood) and other publishers around the world. Favorable reviews appeared in The New York Times, Time, The Washington Post, and elsewhere. A retelling of the Biblical tale of Noah, the book trod a fine line between respect and irreverence for the source material. Follow-up novel Fallen (2005 in the US; 2006 in the UK) featured a somewhat darker treatment of the garden of Eden story, featuring Abel and Cain and Adam and Eve. The book's reverse chronology (it begins with Cain as an old man haunted by his brother and unwinds to the moment immediately following Adam and Eve's expulsion) was viewed as gimmicky by some critics, but overall, the book was as favorably received as the first. Janet Maslin of The New York Times stated that "this book's power to rivet the reader approaches the miraculous." Fallen caused the Los Angeles Times to report that "Maine's storytelling is as human as it is divine."

Reviews were mixed for Maine's third Biblical retelling, 2006's The Book of Samson. The New York Times remained enthusiastic, stating that "his audacity is irresistible," while the UK's The Guardian newspaper noted that "by fleshing out the story on its own terms, [Maine] conveys the amplitude of its moral horror." But some critics, perhaps uncomfortable with the equation of "moral horror" in regards to much-loved Sunday school parables, remained muted.

In 2008 Maine published his fourth novel, Monster, 1959. This marked a sharp break from the Biblically themed stories that had made up his oeuvre thus far. Its skewed retelling of a 1950s-style monster movie earned praise in some quarters, but puzzled looks in others. The New York Times Book Review characterized it as "An audacious literary mishmash... ungainly and oddly endearing." In some ways it remains his most challenging work to date.

August 2011 saw Maine independently releasing an eBook entitled The Gamble of the Godless, an epic fantasy which marked another major shift in focus for his published work. The first volume of a proposed series, the book has received positive notices from bloggers and reviewers on such sites as www.goodreads.com. One blogger went so far as to say that "David Maine has created a wonderful cast of characters and an elaborately detailed world – one of the most engaging I've experienced." Another praises it as "a fun read that you will find yourself easily slipping into."

Maine's next literary novel, An Age of Madness, was released in fall 2012 from Red Hen Press, a small but highly regarded literary press based in Pasadena, California. Meanwhile, he continues his career as a cultural commentator and reviewer of books, music and movies on the web site PopMatters.com, where he also writes a regular column on 1950s science fiction movies called "Don't Open That Door!"

== Published works ==
- The Preservationist (St. Martin's Press, 2004) Also published as The Flood (Canongate)
- Fallen (St. Martin's Press, 2005)
- The Book of Samson (St. Martin's Press, 2006)
- Monster, 1959 (St. Martin's Press, 2008)
- The Gamble of the Godless (independent release, 2011)
- An Age of Madness (Red Hen Press, 2012)
