= Yahooze =

Single by Olu Maintain
- Released: October 27, 2007
- Recorded: 2007
- Genre: Afrobeats, Afropop
- Length: 4:20
- Label: Reloaded Records
- Songwriters: Olu Maintain; Olalekan Babatunde Olayade
- Producer: Puffy Tee

Olu Maintain singles chronology
"I Catch Cold" (2004)	"Yahooze" (2007)	"Nawti" (2007)

Music video
- "Yahooze" on YouTube

"Yahooze" is a song by Nigerian recording artist Olu Maintain. It was produced by Puffy Tee and officially released on October 27, 2007, as the lead single from his debut album of the same name. The music video for "Yahooze" was shot in Nigeria. The official remix features guest vocals from Nigerian recording artist LKT. "Yahooze" won Hottest Single of the Year at the 2008 Nigeria Entertainment Awards.

== Performances ==
According to an article posted on The Punch website, Olu Maintain performed "Yahooze" at the Royal Albert Hall, London and brought on stage Colin Powell, the former United States Secretary of State.

== Accolades ==
Year	Awards ceremony	Award description(s)	Results
2008	Nigeria Entertainment Awards	Hottest Single of the Year	Won
2008	The Headies	Song of the Year	Won

== Track listing ==
Digital single

No.	Title	Writer(s)	Producer(s)	Length
1.	"Yahooze"	Olu Maintain, LKT	Puffy Tee	4:20

== Release history ==
Country	Date	Format	Label
Nigeria	October 27, 2007	Digital download	Reloaded Records
