= Bez (musician) =

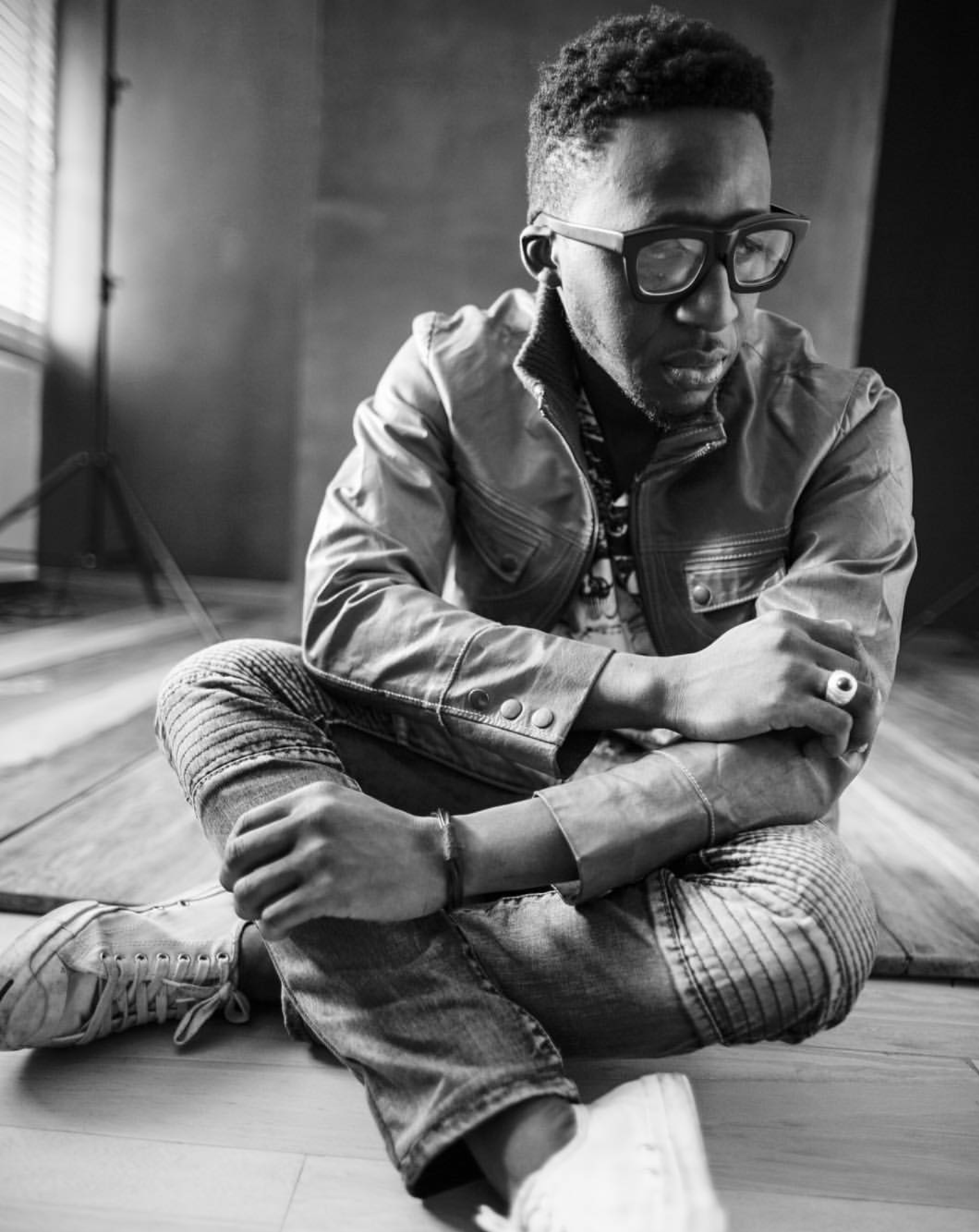

Background information
- Born: Emmanuel Bez Idakula; 10 November 1983 (age 42); Jos, Plateau State, Nigeria
- Genre: Alternative soul
- Occupations: Musician singer-songwriter Composer
- Instruments: Vocals; Guitar; Piano
- Years active: 2007–present
- Label: Cobhams Asuquo Music Production
- Website: bezworld.com bezlive.com

Emmanuel Bez Idakula (born 10 November 1983), known professionally as Bez , is a Nigerian multi-instrumentalist, singer-songwriter, and composer. He primarily makes alternative soul music, a hybrid of soul, rock, jazz, and R&B. Bez was ranked first on Pulse Nigeria's list of the "Top 12 Musicians to Look Out for in 2014".

== Early life and education ==
Emmanuel Bez Idakula was born in 1983, in Jos, Nigeria. He grew up in a musically inclined family and listened to gospel and country music. His father was a politician and amateur guitarist, while his mother sang casually around the house. Bez has two sisters named Eunice and Lydia, and a younger brother named Anyidakula. He sang in the choir at his church and started playing his father's guitar when he was nine years old. Bez also dabbled in painting and sketching, and was fond of fixing things. His family struggled financially following his father's death. An anonymous person paid for his high school education. In college, he received help paying his fees as well.

Upon finishing Loyola Jesuit College, Bez attended Covenant University, where he earned a degree in Information and communications technology in 2007. While at Covenant University, he sang at open mic nights and met Praiz, who he later collaborated with on "That Stupid Song". Bez read He-Motions by Bishop TD Jakes and other spiritual and self-help books, which led him to the view that his purpose in life is to add value to the world through his music.

== Career ==
=== Super Sun ===
Bez's album Super Sun was released in 2011, and includes the single "That Stupid Song". The Boston Globe placed this song at number 3 in its top ten world music albums of 2011, calling Bez a "superb alternative-soul singer". Connect Nigeria called it "unusual and just a perfect blend for a debut album"

In an interview with Vanguard Nigeria, Bez stated "That Stupid Song" was created accidentally when someone entered the studio requesting "a stupid song". Bez's producer, the talented songwriter and music producer, Cobhams Asuquo, thought to create a song that was a mixture of different songs they sang while growing up. They invited Praiz to do a collaboration with Bez and they recorded "That Stupid Song" the next day.

=== Gbagyi Child ===
In November 2013, Bez premiered the first single off his second album, My Baby also produced by Cobhams Asuquo, that was released in 2014. The title and release date are currently unknown. In the interview of April 2013 with Vanguard Nigeria, Bez stated that his next album will be a slight departure from the sound he is known for, stating he will be putting a more African sound in his music and rock while keeping the soul present in the music. This may make the music a bit more mainstream.

Gbagyi Child was released on 28 November 2016. 360nobs calls the album 'swirling, expressive, poetic, lush and bursting to the seams with its influences'. It includes the remix track of 'You Suppose know' which features acclaimed Nigerian artiste Yemi Alade.

=== Tours and other career accomplishments ===
Bez's music video of "That Stupid Song", premiered on the renowned BET's 106 & Park, an American hip-hop and R&B music video show, in January 2012. He was the first African artist to world premiere his music video on BET and the first Nigerian artist to do a solo show at the iTunes store in Soho, New York. He also had a show at the iTunes store in Santa Monica, California for Black Music month in June 2012.

Bez enjoys being on stage: "Once I get on stage, it goes crazy from there. We perform with our hearts and just go in. It's great energy on stage and we try to keep it that way till the end." Recording in the studio also has many rewards. "Sometimes it may be down to business, other times and most of the time… it's just pure unadulterated fun!!"

Bez performed at many events in 2012: The New Africa Shrine in Harlem, New York; the Applause Africa Award ceremony honouring Angélique Kidjo in Manhattan, New York; Arts Alive Festival and Moshito Music Conference in Johannesburg, South Africa; Africa Utopia at Southbank Centre in London, UK; Africa Leadership Network Annual conference in Addis Ababa, Ethiopia, and Nigeria House pre-Olympic concerts in London, UK. He also performed for Sol Village at SOBs in Manhattan, New York, and for the TML100 event in Nairobi, Kenya. He also performed in the "Spinlet All African Showcase", (the first of its kind), at SXSW in Austin, Texas; in March 2012. His Super Sun Concert in Nigeria, in December 2012, received raves.

In 2013, Bez made the American tour in March, and the European tour which was held later in the summer of the same year. He also played the Slide and Bounce Tour, sponsored by Globacom.

== Personal life ==
Bez married Bolatito Ladoja, the daughter of former Oyo State Governor Rasheed Ladoja, in January 2014. Bolatito works as a banker at First City Monument Bank. She holds a bachelor's degree in International Relations from Warwick University in the United Kingdom, with a Masters in Management from Imperial College in London. Bolatito is supportive and involved in Bez's career, and is often present at his gigs. Bez is currently based in Lagos. Musically, his biggest influences are Amy Winehouse, the Beatles and '70s soul. In addition to guitar, he also plays piano and percussion.

== Charitable involvement ==
Bez founded the Bez Idakula Foundation to help with educational needs for kids who can't afford it, and to try to help transform their lives in the same way his own life was affected and transformed. Bez also sits on the board of an NGO, Ovie Brume Foundation, is a member of the African Leadership Network and is one of two Nigerian members of Sandbox, a global network of young entrepreneurs. He also endorses '’Friends Africa'’ and a Telecommunications brand in Africa, Globacom and has appeared in their commercials. In March 2012, Bez spoke at the Harvard Africa Business Conference on an entertainment panel.

== Awards and nominations ==
Bez received six nominations in the 2012 The Headies, the Nigerian Music Awards: Recording of the Year (single "The Stupid Song"), Best R 'N' B Single ("The Stupid Song"), Best R 'N' B/Pop Album (Super Sun), Best Collaboration (Stupid Song featuring Praiz), Best Vocal Performance, and Hip Hop World Revelation.

== Discography ==
- Super Sun (2011)
- Gbagyi Child (2016)
- The Light (2019)
