= Gigo (Garbage in Garbage Out) =

EP by Eva Alordiah
- Released: November 20, 2011
- Recorded: 2010–2011
- Genre: Hip hop
- Label: 3UD
- Producers: Sossick; Gray Jon'z; Ese Peters; Bigfoot

Eva Alordiah chronology
| Gigo (Garbage in Garbage Out) (2011) | Eva (2014) |

Singles from Gigo (Garbage in Garbage Out)
- 1. "I Done Did It"; 2. "Down Low"; 3. "Garbage Out (Your Fada)"; 4. "High"

Gigo (Garbage in Garbage Out), commonly known as The GIGO EP, is the debut extended play by Nigerian rapper Eva Alordiah. It was released for free digital download on November 20, 2011, by 3UD. The EP features collaborations with Saucekid, Shank, Xvol, Basketmouth, Chigul, Ikechukwu, Sossick, Bigfoot, Gray Jon'z, and Tintin. It comprises nine tracks and was supported by the singles "I Done Did It", "Down Low", "Garbage Out (Your Fada)" and "High".

== Background and cover art ==
In an interview posted on the website The Nigerian Voice, Eva described the EP as a project that explores her love for the different types of music she's being infused with. By releasing the EP, she believes she's giving back to society in her own way. In another interview with newspaper the Weekly Trust, Eva said she recorded the EP in order to create different sounds that are true to her image as an artist. She also said she was influenced by several musical genres, including rap, afrobeat, dancehall and R&B. The EP's artwork and photography were designed by Ugo Daté and Obi Somto, respectively.

== Recording and releases ==
Eva started working on The GIGO EP as an independent artist. The Sossick-produced track "I Done Did it" was released as the lead single. In an interview with MTV Iggy's Halley Bondy in 2012, Eva said she was honored to have worked with the aforementioned producer and had fun recording the EP.

Eva released the second single, "High", in 2012. The accompanying music video for the song, which was directed by Mex and uploaded to YouTube on May 24, 2012, premiered on MTV Base that same month. Following the song's release, many people misconstrue its meaning and thought it alluded to drug use and drug abuse. In the aforementioned interview with Bondy, Eva said the song is about overcoming the struggles and hardships of life.

In April 2014, Eva released Eva Says, a mini video series that include live performances of songs from the EP.

== Track listing ==
| No. | Title | Writer(s) | Producer(s) | Length |
|---|---|---|---|---|
| 1. | "Ehh (Garbage In)" (featuring Xvol) | Elohor Eva Alordiah; Xvol | Bigfoot | 3:27 |
| 2. | "Hottie" | Alordiah | Sossick | 3:42 |
| 3. | "High" | Alordiah | Gray Jon'z | 3:40 |
| 4. | "Crazy (Saucekid Skit)" | Saucekid | Gray Jon'z | 0:48 |
| 5. | "Crazy" (featuring Saucekid) | Alordiah; Saucekid | Gray Jon'z | 4:04 |
| 6. | "I Done Did It" | Alordiah | Sossick | 4:04 |
| 7. | "Never Say Goodbye" | Alordiah | Gray Jon'z | 3:49 |
| 8. | "Down Low" (featuring Shank) | Alordiah; Shank | Tintin | 3:49 |
| 9. | "Garbage Out (Your Fada)" (featuring Basketmouth, Chigul and Ikechukwu) | Alordiah | Tintin | 3:20 |

Notes

- "—" denotes a skit

== Personnel ==
- Elohor Eva Alordiah – primary artist, writer
- Sossick – record producer
- Bigfoot – record producer
- Gray Jon'z – record producer
- Tintin – record producer
- Saucekid – featured artist, skit
- Shank – featured artist
- Xvol – featured artist
- Ikechukwu – featured artist
- Basketmouth – skit
- Chigurl – skit
- Obi Somto – artwork photographer
- Ugo Daté – artwork designer

== Release history ==
| Country/Digital platform | Date | Version | Format | Label |
|---|---|---|---|---|
| Nigeria | July 17, 2012 | Standard | CD; digital download | 3UD |
| iTunes | December 19, 2011 | Standard | CD; digital download | 3UD |
