= Bed of Stone =

Studio album by Aṣa
- Released: 25 August 2014
- Recorded: 2013
- Genre: Acoustic rock; folk
- Length: 47:17
- Label: Naive Records
- Producer: Blair MacKichan; Benjamin Constant

Aṣa chronology
Beautiful Imperfection (2010)	Bed of Stone (2014)	Live in Lagos (2017)

Singles from Bed of Stone
- 1. "Dead Again" Released: 23 May 2014

Bed of Stone is the third studio album by French-Nigerian singer Aṣa. It was released on 25 August 2014 through Naive Records. Recorded in the East-Sussex area in the UK, the album was co-written and produced by Blair MacKichan, a British producer that has already worked with Sia and Lily Allen. Bed of Stone is, according to the label company an album that goes "right to the heart". It features a folk sound similar to her previous albums Beautiful Imperfection and Aṣa.

Its lead single, "Dead Again" was released in May, 2014, while a clip video has broadcast the same day. The song is the opening track of the record, it is a piano ballad that deals with a bitter love. The album was acclaimed by critics upon release.

== Critical reception ==
Bed of Stone received widespread critical acclaim upon release. Pop Magazine rated the album 4 out of 5 stars, and called it "a full and rounded musical experience," as well as a more "personal" album than Aṣa's previous releases. They also praised the album's musical style, calling it "smooth" and "graceful". Festus Okubor Goziem of 360Submissions also praised Bed of Stone, and deemed it a "masterful, controlled, [and] confident album." They further applauded Aṣa for her vocal delivery, and compared her to Florence and the Machine, Alabama Shakes and The Civil Wars. Bellanaija acclaimed the album, stating that the album was "one of the best albums you would hear this year"; they further praised it by calling it "Grammy-winning music". Udochukwu Ikwuagwu of The Breaking Times gave Bed of Stone another acclaimed review. He rated the album an 8 out of 10, and called it a "near-masterpiece"; Aṣa's vocal delivery and songwriting, as well as the album's production, were particularly acclaimed. Oscar Okeke of Lo Batan gave a positive, albeit more critical, review of the album. Rating the album a B on a scale of A to F, Okeke praised the album's production and its lyrical content, but was more critical of Aṣa's vocal delivery; "Intensified vocals and a surge of instrumentals is what the album needs. It’s called a musical frisson, and Asa could have given us more of it," Okeke said in his review.

== Track listing ==
No.	Title	Music	Producer(s)	Length
1.	"Dead Again"	Aṣa	Blair MacKichan	3:07
2.	"Eyo"	Asa,	MacKichan	3:16
3.	"Satan Be Gone"	Asa,	MacKichan	2:36
4.	"Bed of Stone"	Asa	Constant	4:20
5.	"Moving on"	Asa	Asa	4:16
6.	"Grateful"	Asa	MacKichan	2:45
7.	"Society"	Asa	MacKichan	3:03
8.	"How Did Love Find Me"	Asa	MacKichan	3:41
9.	"Ife"	Asa	Constant	3:46
10.	"Situation"	Asa	MacKichan	2:40
11.	"New Year"	Asa	MacKichan	3:01
12.	"The One That Never Comes"	Asa	MacKichan	4:06
Total length:				47:52

Deluxe Edition bonus tracks
No.	Title	Music	Producer(s)	Length
13.	"Sometimes I Wonder"	Asa	MacKichan	2:59
14.	"Shine Your Light"	Asa	MacKichan	3:34

== Charts ==
Chart	Peak position
French Albums Chart	38
French Physical Albums Chart	44
French Digital Albums Chart	9
Swiss Albums Chart	64
