= Olu Maintain =

Nigerian singer

- Born: Olumide Edwards Adegbulu; September 1976 (age 50); Lagos, Nigeria
- Genres: Afrobeats; afropop; reggae
- Occupation: Singer
- Years active: 1997–present
- Labels: Kentro World; Maintain (former)

Olumide Edwards Adegbulu (born September 1976), known by his stage name Olu Maintain (sometimes called Mr. Yahooze), is a Nigerian singer. He co-founded the musical group known as Maintain with his cousin, Tolu Ogunniyi. Adeboye Bammeke, popularly known as Big Bamo, joined the group, which released six albums between 1998 and 2004 with the hit songs "I Catch Cold", "Domitila" and "Alo" before they separated in 2004.

Olu rose to prominence in May 2007 with the release of the hit song "Yahooze" which hails internet fraud and lavish spending from his debut studio album, Yahooze (2007), and a second album, Maintain Reloaded (2008). He featured Big Bamo in the single "Kowonje". "Yahooze" was named Hottest Single of the Year at the Nigeria Entertainment Awards. Olu Maintain's "Yahooze" was the genesis of an open declaration of support for internet fraud and lavish spending by an "A list" artiste which is now a norm in the Nigeria music industry.

In 2008, he performed "Yahooze" at the Royal Albert Hall, London and brought on stage Colin Powell, the former United States Secretary of State.

== Biography ==
He was born in September 1976 in Lagos State, western Nigeria, but hails from then Ondo State, southwestern Nigeria. His parents are medical practitioners; his father is a medical doctor and his mother is a nurse.

In 2001, he obtained a diploma certificate in accountancy from The Polytechnic, Ibadan, but began his music career in 1997. The same year, he released his first album, Domitila. The music was aired in October 1998.

On 27 July 2009, he released the album With All Due Respect, Press Play with a hit single titled "What a Man Can Do" featuring Kentro World.

In January 2012, he released a single, "Nawti", which earned the Nigeria Entertainment Awards for Best Video of the Year and Best Reggae/Dancehall Video of the Year at the Nigeria Music Video Awards. On 4 January 2013, he released two songs, titled "Hypnotize Me", featuring 50 Cent and Olivia, and "Oya Dancia", featuring Fatman Scoop.

== Discography ==
Compilation albums

- Olu Maintain (2017)

Singles (partial)

- "Yahooze" (2009)
- "Nawti" (2012)
- "Hypnotize" (2013)
- "Cinderella" (2015)
- "Excuse My French" (2016)

== Awards and nominations ==
Awards and nominations
Award	Wins	Nominations
Nigeria Entertainment Awards	2	0
Nigeria Music Video Awards	1	0
World Music Awards	0	1

Totals (Note: Certain award groups do not simply award one winner. They acknowledge several different recipients, have runners-up, and have third place. Since this is a specific recognition and is different from losing an award, runner-up mentions are considered wins in this award tally. For simplification and to avoid errors, each award in this list has been presumed to have had a prior nomination.)
- Wins: 5
- Nominations: 3
