= Cobhams Asuquo =

Nigerian musician (born 1981)

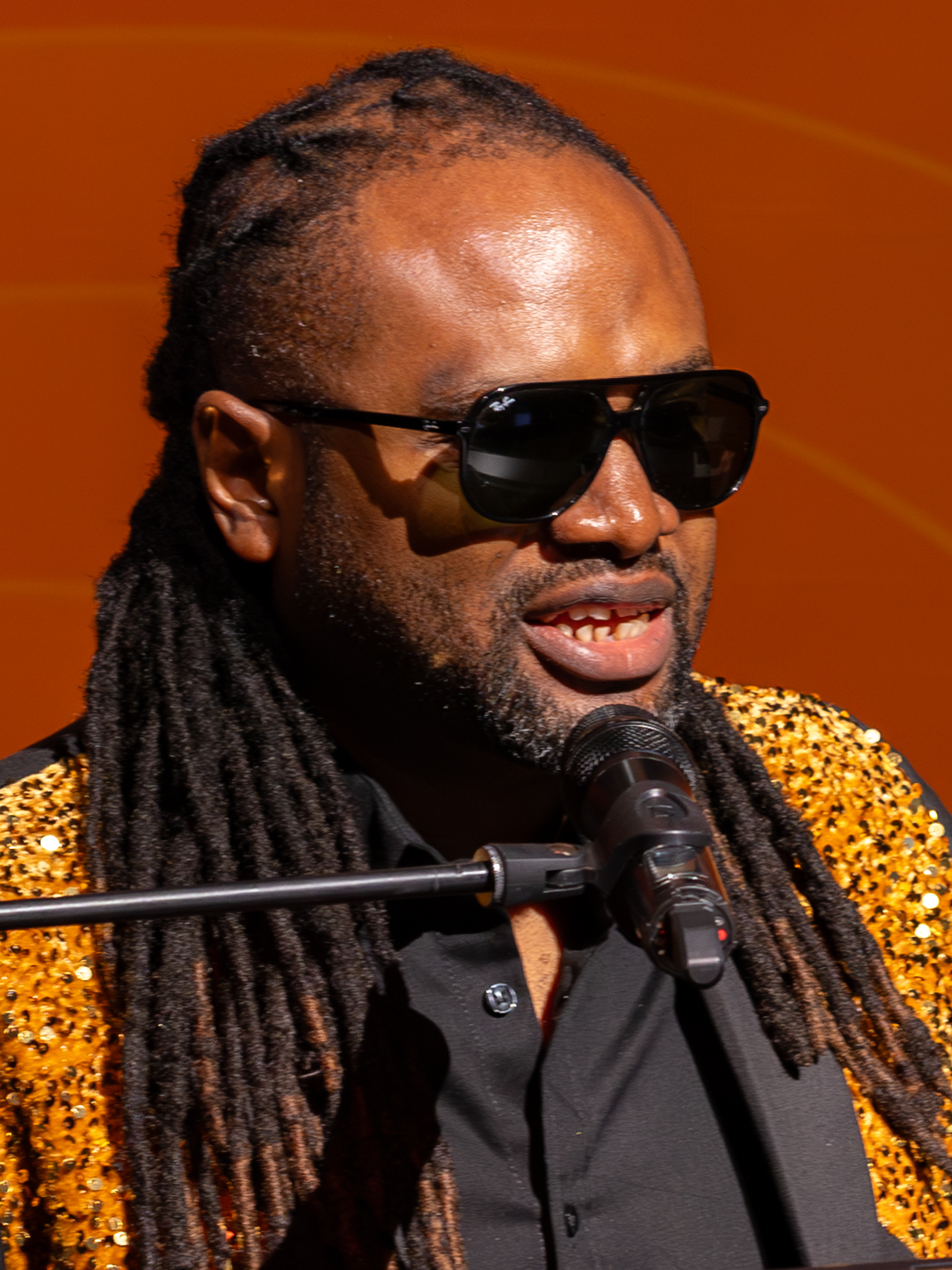
- Asuquo in 2024

Background information
- Born: Cobhams Emmanuel Asuquo; January 6, 1981 (age 45)
- Origin: Calabar, Cross River State
- Genres: Pop/RnB/Afrobeat
- Occupations: Music producer, singer, songwriter
- Instruments: Vocal, piano, guitar
- Years active: 1999–present
- Website: www.cobhamsasuquo.com

Cobhams Asuquo (Efik pronunciation: [ˈko̞bʱäms äsˈuːku:wo̞]) (born January 6, 1981) is a Nigerian musician, producer, and songwriter. After working as Head of Audio Productions at a local label, Questionmark Entertainment, he set up his own recording facility in 2006. He is the former CEO/Head of Productions of CAMP (Cobhams Asuquo Music Productions), which he co-managed with Bez Idakula and Stan Iyke.

== Music career ==
Cobhams Emmanuel Asuquo started his academic training as a lawyer. Previously signed to Sony/ATV UK publishing as a songwriter, Cobhams formed his first music production and label company Cobhams Asuquo Music Production (CAMP) in 2008. In 2016 he started Vintage Gray Media Ltd. Vintage Gray Media Ltd. produced 74 episodes of "The Top 12 Countdown with Cobhams Asuquo – a music countdown show aimed at showcasing new music.

Asuquo produced ASA’s debut album. He also wrote and co-wrote several songs on the album including the singles, "Fire on the Mountain" and "Jailer". He has worked with numerous musicians both local (Nigeria) and International. From the early 2000s he produced hits, including ‘Maintain in India,’ and ‘Catch cold’ by Maintain; ‘Ego’- Djinne; ‘In the music’, ‘If you ask me’ by Omawumi to recently released 2017 butterflies also by Omawumi. His stable of artistes includes : Asa, Banky W, Omawumi, ELDee, Sasha, Dare Art-Alade, Waje, Timi Dakolo, Djinne, Faze, Seyi Shay, Korede Bello, Tiwa Savage, Ego, Yemi Alade, Bez, Omolara, Chidinma Ekile, Shola Allyson, Lara George, Ego, Silver Saddih, Flavour, Mo'Chedda, Praiz, Simi and Rooftop MC's.

He has arranged music, and performed with bands at international music events such as The Harare International Festival of Arts, the AFA Sponsored French Cultural Center Concert with Asa and Angelique Kidjo; AFA Sponsored French Cultural Center Concert in Johannesburg, South Africa; Nigeria Week in Paris and the launch of MTV's one hundredth channel (MTV Base Africa) at Abuja, Nigeria. In the TV and film media, he has composed and arranged film scores to be interpreted for conservatoires as well as for film and stage performances such as "A Voice for Ella" by Uche Macaulay, Sunshine (Alpha Vision), "Bent Arrows" by Isang Awah and Communication for Change's "Bayelsan Sillhouttes.”

Asuquo performed at the World Economic Forum in Davos, Switzerland in January 2014. CNN Africa Voices interviewed Asuquo in December 2011.

Asuquo, alongside African musicians such as Dbanj, Omawumi, Femi Kuti and Somi, visited the White House to raise awareness on agriculture in Nigeria, through Bono’s global humanitarian group, ‘ONE Campaign’. He was also invited to participate in the three-day US-Africa summit. Asuquo was invited by the ONE campaign to produce the anthem for the "Poverty is Sexist’ campaign titled Strong Girl.

Asuquo was called again to produce a remix of "StrongGirl", this time including Bono as one of the artistes. Asuquo was also invited to be part of the UN Global Goals campaign and co-produced the song "Tell Everyone". The song featured various African artistes such as Sauti Sol (Kenya), Mafikizolo (South Africa), Yemi Alade (Nigeria) and Diamond Platnumz (Tanzania). On September 26, Asuquo performed on stage at the Global Citizens Festival New York Central Park to promote the UN Global Goals. Asuquo was a producer on the Coke Studio Africa Season 3 show, which aired across various African countries. In 2016 Asuquo produced the Rhythm Unplugged show and Hennessy Artistry. He also produced the first "One Africa" concert in Houston Texas.

On January 1, 2015, Asuquo released his first music video for "Ordinary People". He has released 5 other singles – "Do the Right Thing" featuring Bez (2015), Christmas song "Star of Wonder" (2015), Boosit ft. Falz (2016), "The Other Room" ft. Ugovinna (2016) and "Adore" ft. Lauretta Cookey and Fome Peters (2016).

== Singles ==
His latest single is "We Plenti" featuring Simi, was released on January 6, 2019.

Asuquo released his first single "Ordinary People" on January 1, 2014, and released the video the following January. Star of Wonder released in December 2014 is his second officially released single. His third single Stronger Than Before was released in 2015 and was sung by Morayo. He released his fourth single Boosit featuring Falz in April 2016.

== Production work ==
Asuquo also wrote and co-wrote several songs on the album including the singles, "Fire on the Mountain", and "Jailer".

Asuquo has likewise produced songs for Nigerian recording artistes such as Banky W and Omawumi.

He has arranged music, and performed with bands at international music events as The Harare International Festival of Arts, the AFA Sponsored French Cultural Center Concert with Asa and Angélique Kidjo; AFA Sponsored French Cultural Center Concert in Johannesburg, South Africa; Nigeria Week in Paris and the launch of MTV's one hundredth channel (MTV Base Africa) in Abuja, Nigeria.

In the TV and film media, he has composed and arranged film scores to be interpreted for conservatoires as well as for film and stage performances such as "A Voice for Ella" by Uche Macaulay, Sunshine (Alpha Vision), "Bent Arrows" by Isang Awah and Communication For Change's "Bayelsan Sillhouttes".

In 2016, Asuquo started a digital radio countdown show. The digital radio show counts down the hottest African/Nigerian songs that Asuquo thinks the Nigerian audience should be listening to. The show is called The Top 12 Countdown With Cobhams Asuquo.

== Personal life ==
Asuquo is visually impaired. On December 2, 2010, Cobhams Emmanuel Asuquo married Ojuolape Veronica Olukanni, and they have two sons together.

== See also ==
- List of Nigerian gospel musicians
