= Aṣa =

French-Nigerian singer (born 1982)

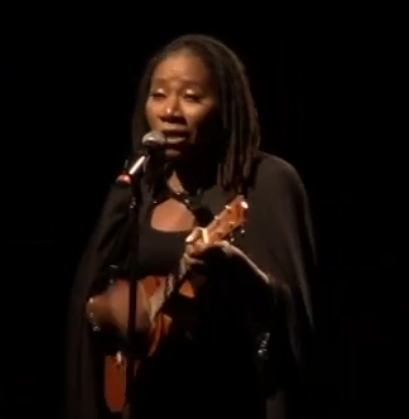
- Aṣa by Lakin Ogunbanwo, 2019

Background information
- Born: Bukola Elemide; 17 September 1982 (age 43); Paris, France
- Genres: Pop; indie pop; Afrobeat
- Instruments: Vocals; guitar; piano
- Labels: Naïve; RUE 11; BMG
- Website: asaofficial.com

Bukola Elemide (born 17 September 1982), known professionally as Aṣa (/ˈæʃə/ ASH-ə, Yoruba: [àʃá], French: [aʃa]), is a French-Nigerian singer and songwriter.

== Early life ==
Aṣa was born in Paris to Nigerian parents who were working and studying cinematography in France. Her family returned to live in Nigeria when she was two years old. Her parents hail from, Ogun State, Nigeria. Aṣa grew up in Lagos city, in the south-western part of Nigeria, and 18 years later, returned to Paris, where her life as an artist took off.

Asa's music influences grew over the years from the collection of great music her father had built up for his work as a cinematographer. These records featuring American, Nigerian and African soul classics, included artists such as Marvin Gaye, Fela Kuti, Bob Marley, Aretha Franklin, King Sunny Adé, Diana Ross, Nina Simone, and Miriam Makeba. Aṣa drew inspiration from the collection of her father's playlist.

== Career ==
In 2004, Asa met her manager and friend, Janet Nwose, who introduced her to Cobhams Asuquo, who in turn became the producer of her first studio album Asa (Asha).

Aṣa returned to France at the age of 20 to study at the IMFP school of jazz music, where she was told by teachers that she should go ahead and become a recording artist because she was ready and needed no schooling. Back in Nigeria, her song "Eyé Adaba," was beginning to get airplay. Aṣa soon signed to Naïve Records. Partnered with Asuquo, and with the new involvement of Christophe Dupouy and Benjamin Constant, she produced her first platinum-selling self-titled album, Aṣa. The release of the album saw Aṣa charting radios across Europe, Asia, and Africa and went on to win the prestigious French Constantin Award in 2008 when she was voted the best fresh talent of 10 singers or groups by a jury of 19 music-industry specialists in Paris.

Her second album, Beautiful Imperfection, in collaboration with French composer Nicolas Mollard, was released on 25 October 2010, went platinum in 2011. The lead single from Beautiful Imperfection, titled "Be My Man", was released in late September 2010. It was reported that by 2014 Aṣa sold 400,000 albums worldwide.

Asa's third studio album, Bed of Stone, was released in August 2014. The singles are "Dead Again", "Eyo", "Satan Be Gone", "The One That Never Comes" and "Moving On". She went on a world tour from 2015 to 2017.

On 14 May 2019, she released a new single titled "The Beginning" and on 25 June 2019, she released the single "Good Thing". On 11 September 2019, she announced on her Twitter page that her album, Lucid, will be released on 11 October 2019. She released her fifth studio album, V, on February 25, 2022. It comprises ten tracks and features guest appearances from Wizkid, highlife duo The Cavemen, and Ghanaian artist Amaarae.

== Discography ==
=== Studio albums ===
Year	Album	Chart positions					
Year	Album	FRA	BEL	ESP	SUI	US Heat	World
2007	Aṣa	15	81	—	65	32	3
2010	Beautiful Imperfection	14	35	61	54	—	3
2014	Bed of Stone	38	80	—	64	—	—
2019	Lucid	—	—	—	—	—	—
2022	V	—	—	—	—	—	—

=== Live albums ===
- Live in Paris (2009)
- Live in Lagos (2017)

=== Singles ===
Year	Title	FRA	BEL	Album
2007	"Fire on the Mountain"	—	—	Aṣa (Asha)
2007	"Jailer"	—	—	Aṣa (Asha)
2010	"Be My Man"	89	76	Beautiful Imperfection
2011	"Why Can't We"	—	94	Beautiful Imperfection
2012	"The Way I Feel"	—	—	Beautiful Imperfection
2012	"Ba Mi Dele"	—	—	Beautiful Imperfection (re-release)
2014	"Dead Again"	109	—	Bed of Stone
2015	"Eyo"	—	—	Bed of Stone
2019	"The Beginning"	—	—	Lucid
2019	"Good Thing"	—	—	Lucid
2019	"My Dear"	—	—	Lucid
2022	"Mayana"	—	—	V
2022	"Ocean"	—	—	V

=== Soundtrack appearances ===
- 2007: "Kokoya" - on the soundtrack to the film The First Cry
- 2009: "The Place To Be" - soundtrack for GTBank
- 2011: "Zarafa" - soundtrack for the animation movie Zarafa

== Awards and nominations ==
- 2008: Prix Constantin
- 2012: French Music Awards Victoires de la Musique nomination for "Female Artist of the Year".

== See also ==
- List of Nigerian musicians
