= List of awards and nominations received by D'banj =

D'banj awards and nominations
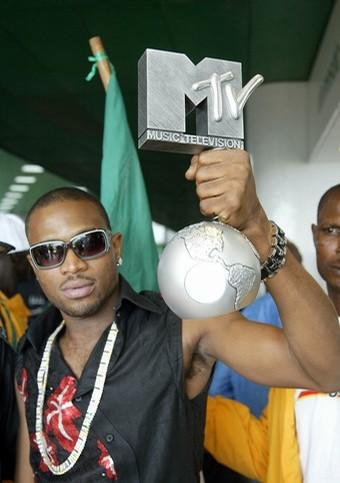
- D'banj at the 2007 MTV Europe Music Awards
Awards and nominations
Award	Wins	Nominations
BET Awards	1	1
Channel O Music Video Awards	6	11
Fizz Awards	1	1
Ghana Music Awards	2	4
The Headies	4	16
Kora Awards	1	2
MOBO Awards	1	4
MTV Africa Music Awards	4	8
MTV Europe Music Awards	2	2
Nigeria Entertainment Awards	3	10
Nigeria Music Video Awards	1	8
Sound City Music Video Awards	1	12
World Music Awards	1	5
4Syte TV Music Video Awards	1	3

Totals (Note: Certain award groups do not simply award one winner. They acknowledge several different recipients, have runners-up, and have third place. Since this is a specific recognition and is different from losing an award, runner-up mentions are considered wins in this award tally. For simplification and to avoid errors, each award in this list has been presumed to have had a prior nomination.)
- Wins: 29
- Nominations: 87

Nigerian singer D'banj has garnered numerous awards and nominations throughout his career following the release of his debut album No Long Thing (2005), and won the Most Promising Male Artist at the 2005 Kora Awards. D'banj has won the Best Newcomer award at the 2006 Channel O Music Video Awards for "Tongolo", a song from his debut album.

His follow-up album, RunDown Funk U Up (2006), included the hit single "Why Me" whose music video included the receipt of 1 Channel O Music Video Awards out of 3 nominations in 2007.

On May 23, 2010, and February 9, 2011, the Kokomaster released "Mr Endowed" and "Mr Endowed (Remix)" respectively. The former was nominated for Hottest Single of the Year at the 2011 Nigeria Entertainment Awards. The music video for the former was nominated in the Best Afro Pop Video and Video of the Year categories at the 2010 Nigeria Music Video Awards (NMWA). Moreover, D'banj was nominated for the Best Use of Effects at the aforementioned awards for the music video. On the other hand, the music video for the latter won the Most Gifted Male Video award, and was nominated for Most Gifted Video of The Year at the 2011 Channel O Music Video Awards. It was also nominated for Best Afro Pop Video award at the 2011 Nigeria Music Video Awards (NMWA).

D'Kings Men, his 2013 compilation album, included the hit single "Oliver Twist". The music video for "Oliver Twist" won the Most Gifted Male Video and Most Gifted Video of the Year awards at the 2012 Channel O Music Video Awards. "Oliver Twist" won the Song of the Year award, and was nominated for Best Pop Single at The Headies 2012. D'banj received the Best Male West Africa nomination at the 2012 Kora Awards for "Oliver Twist". Furthermore, the song was nominated for Hottest Single of the Year at the 2012 Nigeria Entertainment Awards.

== BET Awards ==
Year	Nominee / work	Award	Result
2011	D'banj	"Best International Act (Africa)"	Won

== Channel O Music Video Awards ==
Year	Nominee / work	Award	Result
2006	D'banj for "Tongolo"	"Best Newcomer"	Won
2007	"Why Me"	"Best Male Video"	Nominated
2007	"Why Me"	"Best African West Video"	Nominated
2007	"Why Me"	"Best Special Effects Video"	Won
2008	"Move Your Body"	"Best African West Video"	Nominated
2010	"Fall in Love"	"Most Gifted Afro Pop"	Won
2011	"Mr Endowed (Remix)"	"Most Gifted Male Video"	Won
2011	"Mr Endowed (Remix)"	"Most Gifted Video Of The Year"	Nominated
2012	"Oliver Twist"	"Most Gifted Male Video"	Won
2012	"Oliver Twist"	"Most Gifted Video of the Year"	Won
2013	"Tony Montana (Bad Pass) Remix" (Naeto C featuring D'banj)	Most Gifted Duo/Group/Featuring Video	Nominated

== Fizz Awards ==
Year	Nominee / work	Award	Result
2006	D'banj for "Tongolo"	"Best Newcomer"	Won

== Ghana Music Awards ==
Year	Nominee / work	Award	Result
2007	D'banj	"African Artiste of the Year"	Won
2009	D'banj	"African Artiste of the Year"	Won
2012	D'banj	"African Artiste of the Year"	Nominated
2013	D'banj	"African Artiste of the Year"	Nominated

== The Headies ==
Year	Nominee / work	Award	Result
2006	D'banj	"Revelation of the Year"	Won
2007	Why Me"	"Song of the Year"	Won
2008	D'banj	"Artiste of the Year"	Won
2009	The Entertainer	"Album of the Year"	Nominated
2009	D'banj	"Artiste of the Year"	Nominated
2009	"Fall in Love"	"Song of the Year"	Nominated
2009	The Entertainer	"Best R&B/Pop Album"	Nominated
2010	"You Bad" (Wande Coal featuring D'banj)	"Song of the Year"	Nominated
2011	D'banj	"Artiste Of The Year"	Nominated
2011	"Pop Something" (Dr SID featuring D'banj)	"Song of the Year"	Nominated
2011	"Entertainer"	"Best Pop Single"	Nominated
2012	D'banj	"Artiste Of The Year"	Nominated
2012	"Oliver Twist"	"Song of the Year"	Won
2012	"Oliver Twist"	"Best Pop Single"	Nominated
2013	"Oliver Twist"	"Best Music Video"	Nominated
2013	"Tony Montana (Bad Pass) Remix" (Naeto C featuring D'banj)	Best Collabo	Nominated
2016	"Emergency	"Best Pop Single"	Nominated
2016		"Best Recording of the year"	Nominated

== Kora Awards ==
Year	Nominee / work	Award	Result
2005	D'banj	"Most Promising Male Artist"	Won
2012	D'banj for "Oliver Twist"	"Best Male West Africa"	Nominated

== MOBO Awards ==
Year	Nominee / work	Award	Result
2007	D'banj	"Best African Act"	Nominated
2008	D'banj	"Best African Act"	Nominated
2011	D'banj	"Best African Act"	Nominated
2012	D'banj	"Best African Act"	Won

== MTV Africa Music Awards ==
Year	Nominee / work	Award	Result
2008	D'banj	"Best Artist of the Year"	Won
2008	D'banj	"Best Male Artist"	Won
2008	D'banj	"Best Live Performer"	Nominated
2008	D'banj for "Why Me"	"Listener's Choice Award"	Won
2009	D'banj	"Best Artist of the Year"	Won
2009	D'banj	"Best Male Artist"	Nominated
2009	D'banj	"Best Performer"	Nominated
2010	D'banj	"Song Of The Year"	Nominated

== MTV Europe Music Awards ==
Year	Nominee / work	Award	Result
2007	D'banj	"Best African Act"	Won
2012	D'banj	"Best African Act"	Won

== Nigeria Entertainment Awards ==
Year	Nominee / work	Award	Result
2007	"Why Me"	"Hottest Single of the Year"	Won
2007	D'banj	"Best Afro Pop Act of the Year"	Won
2009	The Entertainer	"Best Album of the Year"	Won
2009	"Suddenly"	"Best Music Video of the Year"	Nominated
2010	"You Bad" (Wande Coal featuring D'banj)	"Hottest Single of the Year"	Nominated
2010	"Fall in Love" (D'banj and Sesan)	"Best Male Music Video of the Year (Artist & Director)"	Nominated
2011	"Mr Endowed"	"Hottest Single of the Year"	Nominated
2011	D'banj	"Best Pop/R&B Artist of the Year"	Nominated
2012	"Oliver Twist"	"Hottest Single of the Year"	Nominated
2012	D'banj	"Best Entertainment Personality"	Nominated

== Nigeria Music Video Awards (NMVA) ==
Year	Nominee / work	Award	Result
2009	"Gbono Feli Feli"	"Best Afro Pop Video"	Won
2010	"Mr Endowed"	"Best Afro Pop Video"	Nominated
2010	D'banj for "Mr Endowed"	"Best Use of Effects"	Nominated
2010	"Mr Endowed"	"Video of the Year"	Nominated
2011	"Mr Endowed (Remix)"	"Best Afro Pop Video"	Nominated
2012	"Tony Montana (Bad Pass) Remix" (Naeto C featuring D'banj)	"Best Afro Hip Hop"	Nominated
2013	"Don't Tell Me Nonsense"	"Video of the Year"	Nominated
2013	"Don't Tell Me Nonsense"	"Best Afro Pop Video"	Nominated
2013	"Don't Tell Me Nonsense"	"Best Use of Choreography"	N/A

== Sound City Music Video Awards ==
Year	Nominee / work	Award	Result
2008	"Move Your Body"	"Best Male Video"	Nominated
2008	"Move Your Body"	"Best R&B/Pop Video"	Nominated
2008	"Move Your Body"	"Best Special Effect/Editing"	Nominated
2008	"Move Your Body"	"Best Video"	Nominated
2008	"Move Your Body"	"Best Cinematography"	Nominated
2008	"Booty Call" (Mo' Hits All Stars)	"Soundcity Fresh Video"	Won
2009	"Suddenly"	"Soundcity Viewers Choice"	Nominated
2009	"Ten Ten" (Mo' Hits All Stars)	"Best Special Effect Editing"	Nominated
2009	"Pere" (Mo' Hits All Stars)	"Best Duo/Group Video"	Nominated
2009	"Wind am Well" (Ikechukwu featuring D'banj)	"Best Collaboration in a Music Video"	Nominated
2009	"Pere" (Mo' Hits All Stars)	"Best Video"	Nominated
2010	"Mr Endowed"	"Soundcity Fresh Video"	Nominated

|}

== World Music Awards ==
Year	Nominee / work	Award	Result
2014	D'banj	"World’s Best Male Artist"	Nominated
2014	D'banj	"World's Best Entertainer of the Year"	Nominated
2014	D'banj	"Best-selling African Artist"	Won
2014	"Oliver Twist"	"World’s Best Song"	Nominated
2014	"Oliver Twist"	"World’s Best Video"	Nominated

== 4Syte TV Music Video Awards ==
Year	Nominee / work	Award	Result
2013	"Don't Tell Me Nonsense"	"Best African Act Video"	Nominated
2012	"Oliver Twist"	"Best African Act Video"	Nominated
2011	"Mr Endowed Remix"	"Best African Act Video"	Won
