= Ayo Shonaiya =

Filmmaker and lawyer

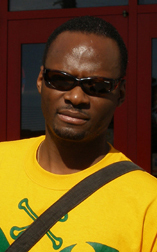
- Born: Ayoola Olufemi Shonaiya; 6 December 1968 (age 57); London, United Kingdom
- Education: University of Westminster; Nigerian Law School
- Occupations: Filmmaker and lawyer
- Years active: 1992–present
- Website: www.ayoshonaiya.com

Ayo Shonaiya is a filmmaker and lawyer, he was also a music talent agent who has managed many of Nigeria's artists. The list include Fuji musician Wasiu Ayinde Marshall (K1 De Ultimate), pop star D'banj, music producer Don Jazzy and rapper Eldee the Don. He has also represented former beauty queen and rapper Muna and global music star Akon. He is the founder of entertainment and media management company The RMG Company in the UK and Nigeria, and Managing Partner at the Lagos-based law firm Shonaiya & Co.

== Early life and education ==
Born in London, United Kingdom, Shonaiya grew up and was educated in Lagos, Nigeria throughout his formative years. He studied film and television in Fort Lauderdale, Florida, and law in England at the University of Westminster. He is also an alumnus of the Nigerian Law School in Lagos.

== Professional career ==
=== Film ===
While studying film, television and video production at The Art Institute of Fort Lauderdale in Florida, he worked for free at a local TV station to gain experience in producing for television and within months was producing music and adventure segments for a program broadcast on the local Sunshine Cable Network. He was advised while in college to pursue, after graduation, a career in screenwriting for film or documentary filmmaking.

After a brief period in Los Angeles California after college, he returned to London in 1992 to make films for a living, but instead he enrolled at the University of Westminster Law School in 1993 to train as a lawyer. In his final year of law school, he wrote, produced, directed and acted in his first feature film More Blessing about a dubious Nigerian pastor in London.

In 1997 Shonaiya chose to concentrate on a film career and in that year he made and starred in the film King of my Country, playing a Nigerian who travelled to London to work menial jobs but soon turned to fraud. The film was the inspiration for the song King of my Country by Nigerian artiste Sound Sultan, which was later remixed featuring Wyclef Jean.

In 1999 he wrote, directed and starred in his third feature film Spin. The film shoot was halted after 3 weeks when the original lead actress couldn't continue due to illness. There was a break of another 6 weeks before a replacement lead actress was found. British-Nigerian actress Caroline Chikezie was cast in her first starring role in Spin, which also featured Chebe Azih, Deborah Asante and Femi Houghton with the soundtrack by British-Nigerian soul singer Ola Onabule. Spin was the first film by a Nigerian to be premiered in a cinema in the West End of London at the inaugural BFM International Film Festival in 1999. Spin was nominated for Best New Director at the 2001 Pan African Film Festival in Los Angeles and also for the MICA Prize at the FESPACO in Ouagadougou Burkina Faso in the same year.

In 2005, Shonaiya made his fourth feature film in London, writing and directing the film Good Evening, which was produced by Nollywood star Jim Iyke

On 2 April 2021, Shonaiya premiered his documentary, Afrobeats: The Backstory at a cinema in Lagos Nigeria. Believed to be the first documentary on the development of that music genre from Africa, the docu-series is a combination of his 20-year career in music which coincided with the start and growth of what is called Afrobeats today. Filmed over a 20-year period, the documentary series features rare and never-before-seen footages of many big stars, as well as interviews with behind-the-scene pioneers of the genre, including Shonaiya himself, a key player in the history of Afrobeats. On the 29 June 2022, Afrobeats: The Backstory, the 12 Episode documentary series premiered worldwide on Netflix.

=== Television ===
After coming off a world tour with Fuji musician Kwam 1, Shonaiya was invited by his friend Alistair Soyode to help set up and produce original programs for a new television venture, the first black owned TV station in the UK called Bright Entertainment Network (BEN Television). He signed a 2-year contract to produce programs for the station's 24-hour schedule and also as Programs Director to seek and acquire programs from other sources for broadcast. In the 2 years (2003–2005) his company R70 World was responsible for 70% of the station's activity including programs, spin off events and media.

In 2003, he created, produced and directed a music program called Intro, broadcast live from London, with his friend Abass Tijani (DJ Abass) as the presenter. Intro was responsible for showcasing Nigerian and African music videos to Africans in Europe, and creating spin-offs like the annual concert series the Big Nigerian Independence Intro Jam and the Intro Hollywood Special TV feature filmed in Los Angeles annually over the Grammy weekend. Another of his TV programs, the Black Variety Show was first broadcast on BEN TV in August 2003, a live call-in show with 2 presenters (Ronke Apampa and Maria Soyinka). The show was tagged to be about "nothing, something, anything and everything". In all, Shonaiya created and produced 9 programs for BEN TV in 2 years, including In Perspective, Pots & Pans, Out & About and Soul Sista with Dakore Egbuson.

In 2010, Shonaiya created another TV series called United States of Nigeria, featuring exclusive interviews and features about Nigerians in America. The show is presented by Seun Maduka.

=== Music ===
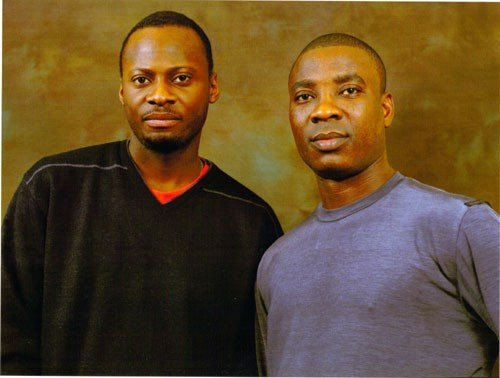
Ayo and Wasiu Ayinde Marshall (K1 De Ultimate) in 1999.

In 1999 while shooting a documentary about K1 De Ultimate and also working as his legal consultant, Shonaiya was invited by the musician to be part of his team full-time. He agreed and signed a contract to become K1 De Ultimate's International Manager and his first job was to promote a Christmas "comeback" concert in London in December of that year. From there he was tasked to co-promote a full UK Tour with Biyi Adepegba of Joyful Noise and subsequently a tour of the United States (and Canada) with a 17 piece band the following year. As international manager, he would eventually tour the world with Kwam 1 and full band 3 times in almost 4 years, recording 5 albums in that period.

In the year 2001, Shonaiya came across the trio of Eldee, Freestyle and Kaboom, young Nigerian rappers in a group called the Trybesmen. Although he was still contracted to Kwam 1, he took a liking to the Trybesmen and started managing them informally and supporting their causes. He once said in an interview "The Trybesmen and Da Trybe were like my children, I was using my manager's percentage money from Wasiu to fund their videos". The Trybesmen videos for "Plenty Nonsense" and "Oya" (by Da Trybe) were directed by him. Shonaiya would subsequently work with and/or manage the careers of the Trybesmen (and members of the Da Trybe such as Dr SID, Sasha and 2Shotz) over a period of 3 years. Shonaiya and Trybe leader Eldee the Don later reunited in Atlanta US as the latter produced his solo album Return of the King.

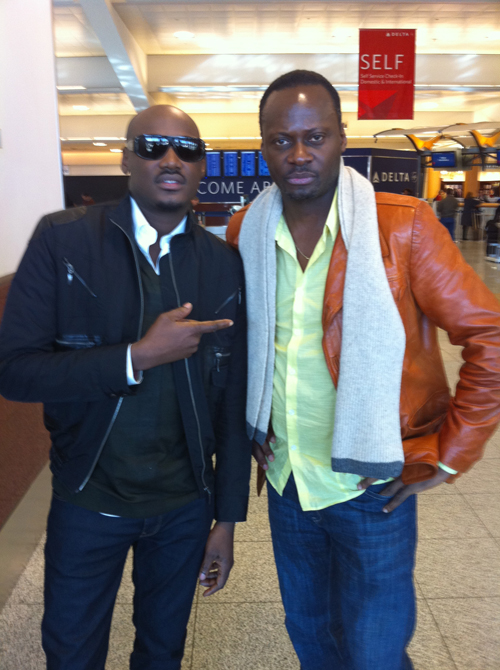
Ayo and 2face Idibia after the taping of the Mo'Nique Show in Atlanta.

In 2004, Shonaiya took relatively unknown artiste D'banj, and producer Don Jazzy, under his wing to develop and manage their early careers. D'banj's first album No Long Thing was produced by Don Jazzy and a strategic plan was drawn up to propel the duo into superstardom. One of the tracks on the album was titled "Tongolo" with the chorus line "make I tell dem the Koko" (D'banj would later nickname himself the Kokomaster). In December 2004 "Tongolo" video was filmed in Lagos Nigeria, and in January 2005, the video was premiered as a World exclusive on the Intro live program with DJ Abass interviewing D'banj and Shonaiya directing the show. The No Long Thing album was subsequently launched in the UK to rave reviews and was marketed in Nigeria by T-Joe. Soon after, Ayo Shonaiya negotiated an unprecedented deal with Obaino Records in Nigeria to pay D'banj for a video remix album based on potential sales. The video/documentary Tongolo Remix (directed by DJ Tee and produced by R70 World) was released in 2005.

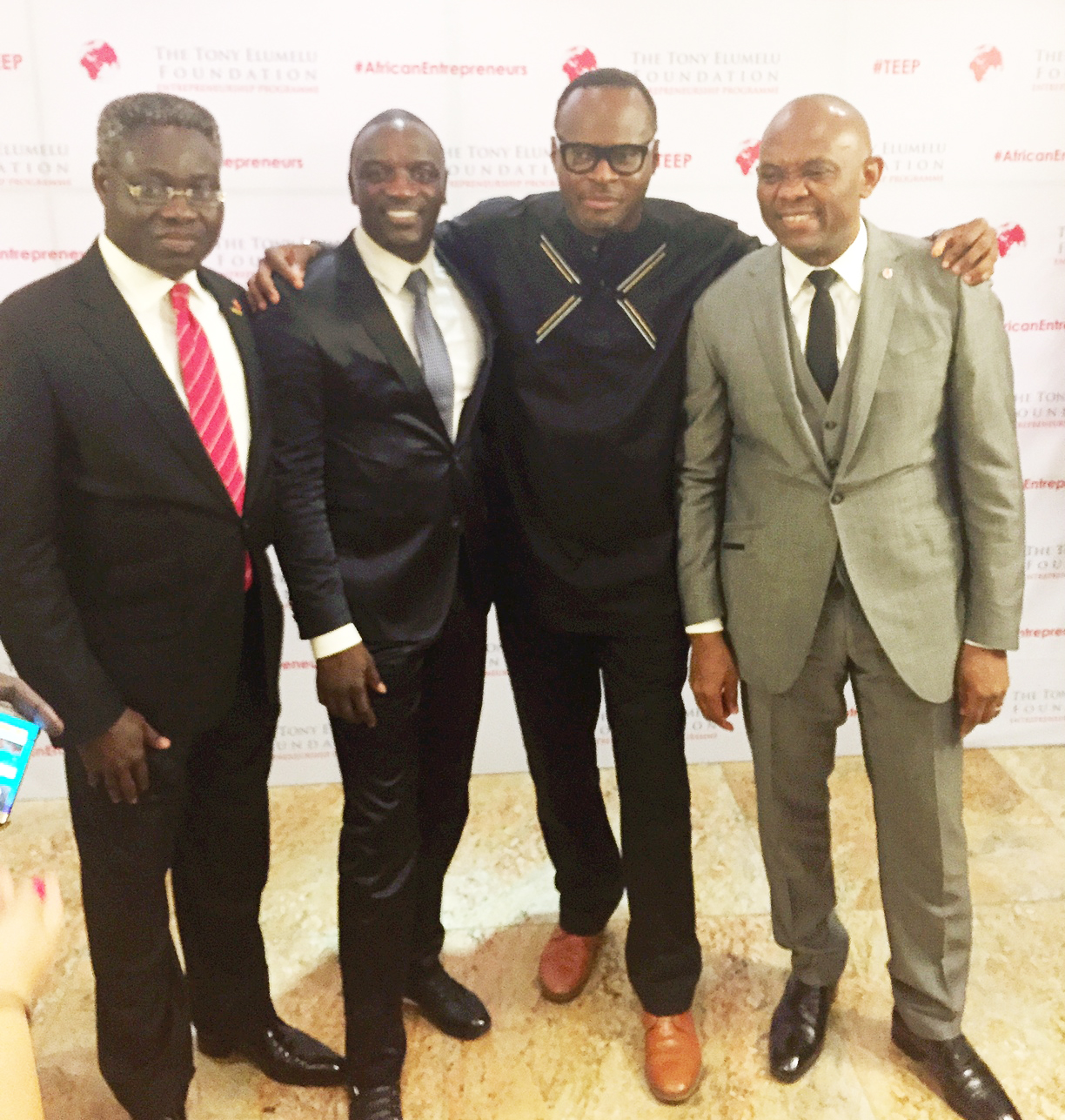
Ayo Shonaiya with UBA MD/CEO Philips Oduoza, Akon and Tony Elumelu at the Tony Elumelu Entrepreneurship Lecture in Lagos 2015.

Shonaiya parted ways with D'banj and Don Jazzy amicably in 2006 and the duo went on to greater successes with their record label Mo' Hits Records until its dissolution in 2012.

In 2006, Shonaiya went to Cross River State, Nigeria, to co-direct a reality TV show called Creative Academii. The contestant who came second was a young student called Michael Ojo (later renamed Michael Word). Shonaiya introduced Michael to producer Puffy T to record some tracks (one of those tracks was "Who Am I" by Nigerian actor Jim Iyke featuring 2face Idibia), and also took Michael on Tour to Abuja, Accra Ghana and to the United Kingdom.

In 2010, model Munachi Abii (Most Beautiful Girl in Nigeria 2007 winner) was signed to Shonaiya's company RMG as Muna the rapper, to manage and represent her. Soon after, Shonaiya brokered a deal for Munachi Abii to become the new face for the Lux soap brand and also in 2012 he brokered the deal for her to be the new brand ambassador for Dabur toothpaste among other media jobs. In May 2012 Shonaiya publicly defended Muna, when she was heavily criticised and attacked on social media forums after she had a minor verbal altercation with Nigerian rapper Mode 9. He was in turn criticised for the way he handled the situation, some calling him arrogant, but within a month of the incident, Muna and Mode 9 performed together on the same stage at Industry Nite.

== Law practice ==
In 2019, Shonaiya founded the law firm Shonaiya & Co. in Lagos, Nigeria, along with three other lawyers. The firm specialises in entertainment, intellectual property, media and sports law.

== Acting ==
Although Shonaiya had acted in his earlier films in the 90s, In 2014, while negotiating the deal between artistes D'banj and Akon for a music and video collaboration, Shonaiya was asked by Akon to play the part of the jealous boyfriend in the music video for the song "Feeling The Nigga", marking his return to the screen as an actor after 15 years.

== Filmography ==
Year	Title	Role	Notes	Ref.
2022	Afrobeats The Backstory	Director	Series Producer	

== Other projects ==
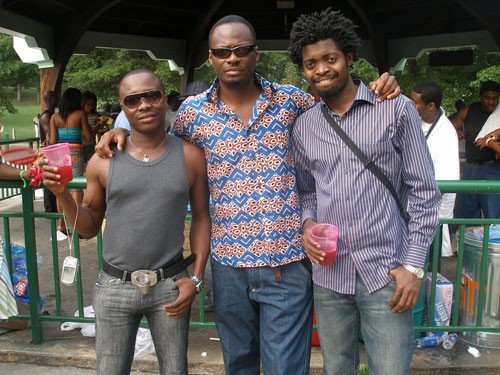
Ayo with comedians Julius Agwu & Basketmouth at the Nigerian Reunion in Atlanta 2006.

- Nigerian Corner at the Notting Hill Carnival, London UK 1986–Present. Founding participant of the Nigerian Corner at the annual Notting Hill Carnival in London in 1986. Co-organiser and Producer for television of the Corner from 1999 at the Cambridge Gardens site (except for 2007 & 2008 when site was closed). Shonaiya was part of the team that resurrected the new Nigerian Corner on Adela Street, London from 2009 to 2011, then producer since 2012.
- Femi Kuti Tour documentary 1999. Documentary of the Afrobeat artiste's tour of UK and Europe in 1999 including performance at Glastonbury Festival.
- Kwam 1 European, US (and Canada) and World Tours, 1999 – 2003. Co- Producer and Tour Manager.
- Big Nigerian Independence Intro Jam and Intro Summer Jam series, London UK 2003 – 2005. Co-Producer with DJ Abass.
- Gordon's "Spark Party" Tour for Guinness Nigeria with DJ Abass and DJ Jimmy Jatt, Abuja, Lagos and Ibadan 2004. Tour Manager.
- Intro Independence Tour, Napoli, London and Dublin 2005. Co-Producer with DJ Abass.
- Intro Afro-Hip Hop Jam, Atlanta US 2005. Producer and Executive Producer.
- Kanu Heart Foundation UK Charity Gala 2006. Co-Producer
- Night of 1001 Laughs, Nigerian Reunion Atlanta 2006. First time ever for Nigerian comedians (Julius Agwu and Basketmouth) performing in the United States. Producer.
- Creative Academii Reality Show, Calabar Nigeria 2006. Co- Director.
- Stars on the Runway, Lagos Nigeria 2007. 60 Celebrities, 12 Designers, 1 Stage. Fashion show to raise money for charity. Co-Creator and Producer for R70 World.
- Most Beautiful Girl in Nigeria (MBGN) UK auditions 2008. Producer for Silverbird Productions.
- Yes Records Tour 2009, Abuja, Accra, Washington DC and London. Tour Manager.
- StarMix SummerFest Concert, London UK 2010. Consultant and Agent for 9ice.
- 9ice Concert Amsterdam 2010. Consultant and Agent for 9ice.
- Arise Magazine Fashion Week 2011, Lagos Nigeria. Agent for model Aminat Ayinde.
- Nokia Don't Break The Beat competition/tour, Lagos, Enugu, Abuja and Benin (Nigeria) 2012. Consultant to YDX.
- Dance Afrique Concert Series 2015. Wembley Arena, London and Medan Racetrack, Dubai. Management for Akon.
- An Evening of Jazz at the State House with Governor Akinwunmi Ambode, Lagos State 2016. Co-Producer.
- Lagos State Town Hall Meeting, London UK 2016. Producer.
- Afrobeats: The Backstory - World Premiere of the documentary series, produced and directed by Shonaiya. Friday 2 April 2021.

== See also ==
- List of Nigerian film producers
