= Afrobeats: The Backstory =

Nigerian TV series

- Genre: Documentary
- Developed by: R70
- Directed by: Ayo Shonaiya
- Music by: Sess, Jospo, Babz
- Countries of origin: United Kingdom; Nigeria
- Original language: English
- No. of seasons: 1
- No. of episodes: 12

Production
- Producer: Ayo Shonaiya
- Production company: R70 Media Generations

Original release
- Network: Netflix
- Release: 29 June 2022

Afrobeats: The Backstory is a documentary series that delves into the rise and global influence of Afrobeats, a genre of music that originated in Nigeria. Directed by Nigerian filmmaker, Ayo Shonaiya, the series was premiered on Netflix on 29 June 2022, offering an in-depth look at the cultural, political, and social landscape that shaped the Afrobeats sound, as well as its growth.

== Overview ==
The series traces the evolution of Afrobeats from its roots in the early 2000s to its rise in global popularity in the 2010s to the present day. The documentary examines how Nigerian pioneers like Fela Kuti laid the groundwork for the contemporary Afrobeats movement, combining traditional African rhythms with funk, jazz, and highlife. Modern Afrobeats, popularized by artists such as Wizkid, Burna Boy, and Davido, has become a genre that fuses African rhythms with hip-hop, dancehall, and R&B.

== Production ==
Ayo Shonaiya is the director, known for his work as a lawyer, music executive, and producer. Shonaiya brings a unique insider perspective to the series, having been involved in the Afrobeats movement for years. His documentary features a blend of personal interviews, archival footage, and performances that document the journey of Afrobeats as a genre.

The documentary was produced over several years, and it includes interviews with key figures in the music industry, both in Nigeria and globally. The series also sheds light on the role of record labels, promoters, and the African diaspora in pushing the genre beyond the continent.

== Episodes ==
Series	Episodes	Originally released	Network
1	12	29 June 2022	Netflix

Episode 1: OG Before IG & The 3 Boy Bands - Afrobeats genre was first introduced in the 1990s with musicians from Nigeria, Ghana and the United Kingdom. This episode features DJ Jimmy Jatt, Dayo 'D1' Adeneye, Tony Tetuila, 2face and Sound Sultan.

Episode 2: 1999 & The 5 Beat Pattern - The importance of the year 1999. The first signs of the changing sound and the music production software, "Hip-Life" in Ghana and the 5 Beat Pattern (Clavé), featuring the producers of the new sound such as Eldee of the Trybesmen and the first female Nigerian rapper Weird MC.

Episode 3: The UK Scene & D'banj and Don Jazzy - How the genre developed in the UK and the players that not only shaped the sound, but brought it to the people, from the music program Intro Live with DJ Abass on BEN TV (Sky UK) to radio shows on BBC 1Xtra to Capital Xtra. The birth of a superstar and the super producer. How D'banj and Don Jazzy happened... and Kanye West.

Episode 4: Music Videos & Music Stations - Music Videos from Nigeria and Ghana and the impact they had on young artistes, the vixens and the video directors that made them, to the music stations. From Music Africa to Channel O, MTV Base, Trace TV and HipTV, and how they shaped the culture, featuring DJ Tee, Clarence Peters and TG Omori.

Episode 5: American Dream & Local Rappers - American Dream to Nigerian Dream, and the Local Rappers who went from American accents to local dialect, and changed the game globally. Featuring Banky W and Sauce Kid, Olamide, Reminisce and Ill Bliss.

Episode 6: The Record Labels & The Queens - Stories capturing changes to the scene as labels learned to make more money. The legal wrangles, royalties, the digital revolution, plus how different it is for females in the game. Featuring Sasha P, Niyola, Chidinma, Simi and Tiwa Savage.

Episode 7: DJs, Producers & Dancehall Music - The beat makers and the hit players. From DJ Jimmy Jatt to Spinall in Nigeria, and DJ Edu from Kenya to DJ Abrantee in the UK. How the spread of the music touched the world at the same time. Plus Dancehall music as the "cousin" of Afrobeats, from Daddy Showkey to Stonebwoy to Shank to Burna Boy.

Episode 8: The New New Sound & The Fusion of African Music - Afro-House, Afro-Fusion and the new sound already coming out of Afrobeats, featuring Niniola, producer Sarz, Adekunle Gold, Joe Boy and Oxlade. New artistes already fusing African music with the many genres across the globe to keep expanding the genre for the future.

Episode 9: Wizkid & Davido and Yoruba Language in Afrobeats - The global explosion of Afrobeats with Wizkid and Davido, and how these 2 ambassadors raised the bar. The importance of Yoruba lyrics and culture in Afrobeats from its early foundations in Fuji music, to the current "street" music in Nigeria.

Episode 10: The Big Concerts - The history of how big concerts developed the music industry in Nigeria and how African artistes now fill big arenas around the world. From Silverbird concerts in the 80s to Lekki Sunsplash to Afronation to Felabration to O2 Arena in London.

Episode 11: Afrobeat & Afrobeats, History & Present - History recap of the naming of the genre Afrobeat with Fela Kuti and Afrobeats in the UK. Exclusive interview with legendary Afrobeat drummer Tony Allen and the debate about who added the S to Afrobeats.

Episode 12: Afrobeats to the World - At this stage, afrobeats has gained more space in the global musical scene: Burna Boy winning a Grammy, Beyonce and The Lion King: The Gift album and Justin Bieber collaborating on a song with Wizkid and Tems. The episode aswers the question: What does the future hold for the genre?

== World premiere ==
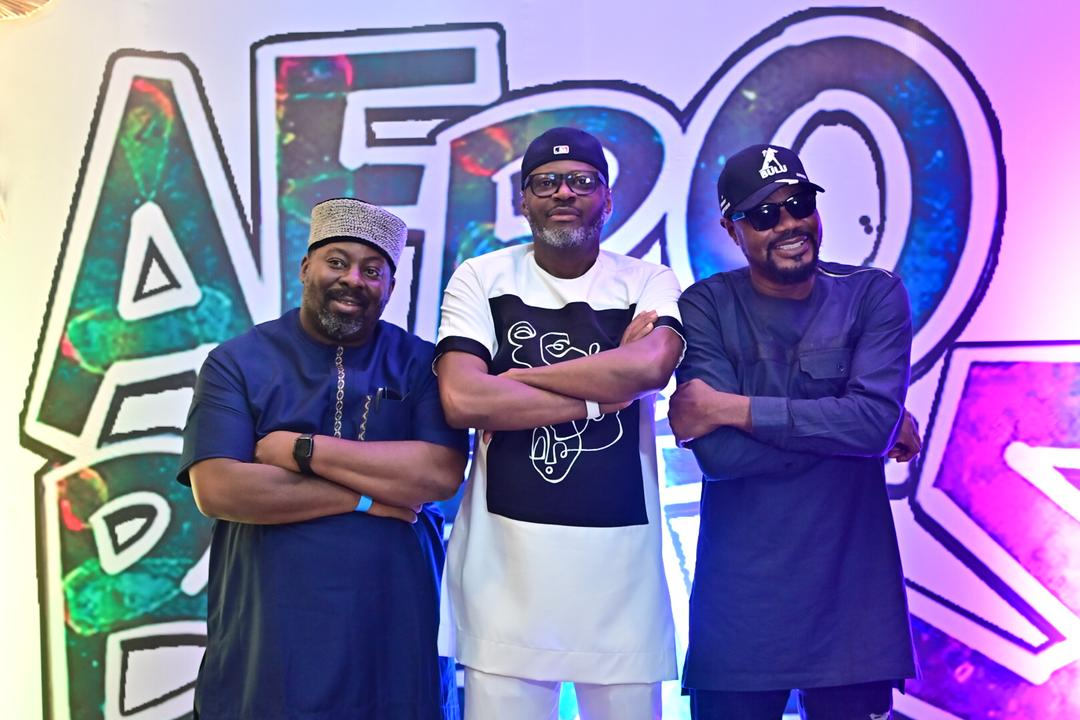
Obi Asika, Ayo Shonaiya and DJ Jimmy Jatt at the 2021 Premiere of Afrobeats The Backstory in Lagos, Nigeria.

The first two episodes of Afrobeats: The Backstory was premiered on 2 April 2021, at the FilmHouse IMAX Cinema in Lekki Lagos in Nigeria, with a selection of the artistes and executives featured in the documentary in attendance.

== Netflix reception ==
The 12-episode documentary premiered worldwide on the streaming platform Netflix on 29 June 2022. Afrobeats: The Backstory has been deemed a "Fastest-rising cultural phenomenon of the 2020s, therefore it made all sense for the streaming company to acquire Ayo Shonaiya’s work and push it with the resolve they’ve shown so far," (Animashaun, 2022). This series has also been noted for highlighting the genre's cultural significance by promoting African identity and heritage on a global scale.

== Significance ==
Afrobeats: The Backstory is seen as a landmark documentary that captures a pivotal moment in the history of African music. It is a celebration of Afrobeats' journey from a local sound to a global movement, showcasing the artists, producers, and industry players who have contributed to its success. The series entertains and educates viewers on the cultural and economic impact of Afrobeats.

== Season 2 ==
On 25 June 2024, Nile Entertainment Group announced their company launch and newly acquired productions for distribution including the Season 2 of Afrobeats The Backstory.
