= Turning Point (Dr Sid album) =

Studio album by Dr Sid
- Released: April 11, 2010
- Recorded: 2009
- Studios: Mo' Hits Studios, Lagos, Nigeria
- Genres: Hip hop, pop, funky house, Afro-pop
- Length: 45:54
- Label: Mo' Hits
- Producers: Don Jazzy (also exec.), DJ Silvastone

Dr Sid chronology
Curriculum Vitae (2007)	Turning Point (2010)	Siduction (2013)

Singles from Turning Point
- 1. "Something About You" Released: August 10, 2009; 2. "Pop Something" Released: August 10, 2009; 3. "When This Song Comes On" Released: January 22, 2010; 4. "Ba Mi Jo" Released: April 13, 2010; 5. "Over the Moon" Released: April 20, 2010

Turning Point is the debut studio album by Nigerian artist Dr Sid, released April 11, 2010, on Mo' Hits Records. Production for the album took place during 2009 at Mo' Hits recording studios and was handled by Don Jazzy.

== Background ==
In April 2009, following the release of Wande Coal's debut album Mushin to Mo'Hits, Don Jazzy began work on Dr Sid's album. Don Jazzy decided to create a new sound for Dr Sid who was known as predominantly a rap artist and decided to have more singing on the album, as well as giving the album Pop feel. The inspiration behind the album was to create music that described "love" and "dance", two emotion that bring joy to most people, as well as introduce listeners to the new sound of Dr Sid. The intent to introduce this new sound led to the Title of the album "Turning Point", which basically describes the transition of Dr Sid's music and life as a whole.

== Recording ==
Most of the album's recording sessions took place in Lagos at the Mo' Hits Recording Studio; the first song to be recorded on the album was "Baby".

== Release and promotion ==
The first set of singles (Something about you, Winchi winchi and Pop Something) off the album were released in September 2009 online at Dr Sid's official website and his Reverbnation page, The videos for Something about you and Pop something were released in October 2009 and May 2010 respectively and received mixed reviews. Dr Sid then embarked on a six state club tour around Nigeria to promote the release of the album.

== Accolades ==
Turning Point was nominated for the "Best R&B/Pop Album" award at the 2011 edition of The Headies.

Year	Awards ceremony	Award description(s)	Results
2011	The Headies	Album of the Year	Nominated
2011	The Headies	Best R&B/Pop Album	Nominated

== Reception ==
Professional ratings
Review scores
Source	Rating
360nobs.com	3/5 stars

The initial reviews were not very good as most people expected to hear a hip hop album and Dr Sid's change in style was not welcome by a lot of his fans. Dr Sid was described as a sell out, going pop on most of the songs on the album. The follow-up singles Pop Something and Over the Moon, helped to improve the rating of the album.

== Track listing ==
No.	Title	Producer(s)	Length
1.	"When This Song Comes On"	Don Jazzy	4:20
2.	"Over the Moon" (featuring K-Switch)	Don Jazzy	3:50
3.	"Something About You"	Don Jazzy	4:19
4.	"Winchi Winchi" (featuring Wande Coal)	Don Jazzy	3:39
5.	"Pop Something" (featuring D'banj)	Don Jazzy	4:53
6.	"Ba Mi Jo" (featuring eLDee, M.I, Ikechukwu)	Don Jazzy	5:20
7.	"Baby"	Don Jazzy	3:20
8.	"E Je Ka Jo" (featuring D'banj)	Don Jazzy	3:31
9.	"Pillow"	Don Jazzy	3:42
10.	"Something About You" (Silvastone remix)	DJ Silvastone	4:57
11.	"Winchi Winchi Remix" (featuring Sway Da Cypha, Wande Coal)	Don Jazzy	4:10
