= ELDee discography =

This is the discography of eLDee, a Nigerian rapper. He has released four studio albums and twenty-one singles.

== Albums ==
=== Studio ===
Year	Album	Chart positions			Sales and certifications
Year	Album	U.S.	UK	NIG	Sales and certifications
2004	Long Time Coming: Released: 2004; Label: Trybe Records/Storm Records	-	-	-	
2006	Return Of The King: Released: September 12, 2006; Label: Trybe Records/Storm Records	-	-	1	
2008	Big Boy: Released: December 25, 2008; Label: Trybe Records	-	-	-	
2010	Is It Your Money?: Released: March 6, 2010; Label: Trybe Records	-	-	-	
2012	Undeniable: Released: July 1, 2012; Label: Trybe Records	-	-	-	

=== Other albums ===
Year	Album	Chart positions			Sales and certifications
Year	Album	U.S.	UK	NIG	Sales and certifications
2000	L.A.G Style: Released: October 2000; Label: Trybe Records	-	-	2	
2004	The Big Picture: Released: June 2004; Label: Trybe Records	-	-	-	
2008	The Trybe Mixtape: Released: 2008; Label: Trybe Records	-	-	-	
2009	The Champion: The Hits: Released: October 1, 2009; Label: FlipSide Records/Trybe Records	-	-	-	

=== As lead artist ===
Year	Single	Album	Chart positions			RIAA certification
Year	Single	Album	^{U.S.}	^{UK}	^{NIG}	RIAA certification
2003	"Speak Out"	Long Time Coming	-	-		
2003	"Many Emcees"	Long Time Coming	-	-		
2003	"I Go Yarn"	Long Time Coming	-	-		
2003	"Better Days"	Long Time Coming	-	-		
2005	"Return Of The King"	Return Of The King	-	-		
2005	"I'm Leaving"	Return Of The King	-	-		
2005	"Everyday"	Return Of The King	-	-		
2005	"Champion"	Return Of The King	-	-		
2007	"Bosi Gbangba"	Big Boy	-	-		
2007	"Big Boy"	Big Boy	-	-		
2007	"I Know Bad People"	Big Boy	-	-		
2007	"Go"	Big Boy	-	-		
2007	"Evolution (Beautiful Things)"	Big Boy	-	-		
2009	"U Blow My Mind"	Is It Your Money?	-	-		
2009	"Koleyewon"	Is It Your Money?	-	-		
2009	"One Day (E Go Better)"	Is It Your Money?	-	-		
2009	"Ota Mi"	Is It Your Money?	-	-		
2011	"Higher"	Undeniable	-	-		
2011	"Today Today"	Undeniable	-	-		
2011	"Wash Wash"	Undeniable	-	-		
2011	"Category"	Undeniable	-	-		

=== As guest artist ===
Year	Single	Album	Chart positions		
Year	Single	Album	^{U.S.}	^{UK}	^{NIG}
2004	"Spray Me Money (Remix)" (with OlaDELe)	Razz Is The New Cool	-	-	
2004	"Naija Boy" (with OlaDELe & TKO)	Razz Is The New Cool	-	-	
2008	"Professional" (with OlaDELe)	The Trybe Mixtape	-	-	
2008	"Uma Do Me" (with OlaDELe)	The Trybe Mixtape	-	-	
2007	"Naija Until I Die" (with Amplifyd Crew)	Amplifyd	-	-	
2002	"Naija With Sauce" (with Sauce Kid)	MoneyLong	-	-	
2003	"It's About To Get Ugly" (with Modenine)	MALCOLM IX: The Lost Sessions	-	-	
2002	"Listening To Me" (with 2Shotz & OlaDELe)	Original Copy	-	-	
2008	"One In A Million" (with Proto)	Supplying Demand	-	-	
2009	"Ijinle Pam-Pam" (with Knighthouse, Kel, Y.Q and Othello)	Unknown	-	-	
2010	"You Know It" (with Goldie)	Gold	-	-	
