= DJ Abass =

Nigerian DJ

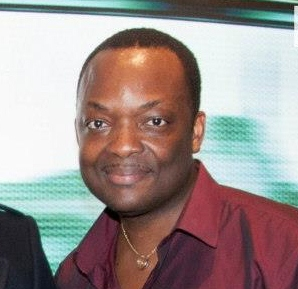
- Born: Abass Abayomi Tijani; London, England
- Occupations: DJ; broadcaster; entertainment & media consultant
- Years active: 1988–present
- Height: 6 ft 0 in (1.83 m)
- Website: www.djabass.com

DJ Abass (born Abass Abayomi Tijani) is a media and entertainment consultant, broadcaster, DJ, and compere based in the United Kingdom. He is the CEO of the entertainment and media management outfit, DJAMEDIA. He is also well known within the Nigerian and African community in the United Kingdom for presenting and co-producing the television show Intro and the "Big Nigerian Independence Intro Jam" series.

== Early life and education ==
DJ Abass, whose birth name is Abass Abayomi Tijani, was born in London to Kolawole Rasak Tijani and Deborah Kojusola Tijani, a nurse and midwife. He then moved to Nigeria with his younger brother, where he was educated at Mate Nursery and Primary School, Lagos; Baptist Academy, Obanikoro, Lagos and later Baptist High School, Port Harcourt. He went on to attend the University of Ado-Ekiti (formerly Ondo State University, now Adekunle Ajasin University), where he obtained a degree in political science. DJ Abass is the first of four children and also has two older half-brothers.

== Early career ==
DJ Abass began his career as a founding member of the Nigerian DJs Association in the UK in 2000. He organized concerts that showcased Nigerian DJs, helping to raise the profile of Nigerian music abroad. In 2002, he transitioned into artist management, working with groups like Solek Crew and mentoring artists such as KAS. This further solidified his role in promoting Nigerian music and culture in the UK.

In addition to his work in artist management, DJ Abass gained prominence as a broadcaster when he began presenting and co-producing the music show Intro Live with DJ Abass on Ben TV. This show was a significant platform for African music artists, as it featured interviews and live performances from stars such as King Sunny Adé and 2Face Idibia. DJ Abass's influence extended beyond just the music industry. He also played a crucial role in organizing and managing Nollywood movie premieres in the UK through his media company, DJAMEDIA. This company became a leader in the African entertainment scene in the UK, handling major events and premieres for films like The Mirror Boy and Anchor Baby.

In 2000, DJ Abass was a founding member of the Nigerian DJs Association UK chapter and helped organize a series of concerts showcasing the very best of Nigerian DJs in the UK.

In 2002, he moved into artiste management when he met the trio of Soji Adebayo, Michael Oloyede, and Michael Enebeli (a.k.a. Don Jazzy) performing as Solek Crew at a regular weekly night spot. He subsequently started to informally manage the group, which went on to be one of the hottest indigenous Nigerian acts in the UK. The band featured as the headline act at many events, notably The BIG Nigerian Independence Intro Jam and The Nigerian Corner at the Notting Hill Carnival. DJ Abass also met and mentored the artist KAS in this period and took him along on a musical trip to Nigeria in 2006.

== Television ==
In 2003, DJ Abass presented and co-produced a live music show on television on the hit music program Intro Live with Dj Abass. The program exclusively showcased Nigerian and African music acts through live interviews and music video premieres. Intro Live was a two-hour TV show and the brainchild of his good friend Ayo Shonaiya. It aired on Ben TV (and later OBE TV) and was seen all over Europe and in some parts of North Africa. Guests on the show include stars like King Sunny Adé, Chaka Demus & Pliers, D'banj, Nneka, Eldee, 2Face Idibia, P-Square, JJC, Erykah Badu, George Clinton, Brenda Fassie, Ying Yang Twins, Wasiu Ayinde Marshall, Lady Saw, Sir Shina Peters, Werason, and Ebenezer Obey.

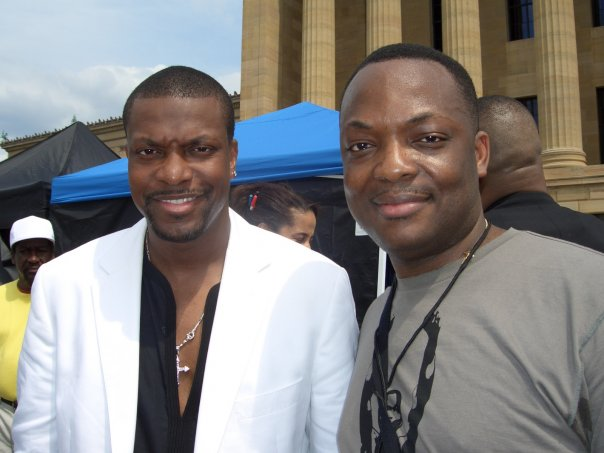
Dj Abass with Chris Tucker

Intro the TV show then had successful spin-offs in the Intro concert series, which included The BIG Nigerian Independence Intro Jam, The Intro Summer Jam, and The Intro Christmas Jam. The Nigerian pop star D'banj's debut solo performance was at the 2004 edition of the BIG Independence Intro Jam, and days after, he was a guest in his first ever televised interview on Intro with DJ Abass.

== Media and entertainment consultancy ==
DJ Abass is the CEO of DJAMEDIA. This outfit is a dedicated media and entertainment consultancy firm specializing in first-class entertainment event management and full media campaigns to targeted demographics within the Nigerian and African communities in the UK.

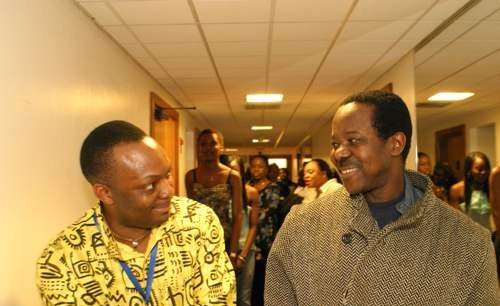
Dj Abass with King Sunny Adé

It has been responsible for large entertainment events within the African social network, and notable among these are first-class Nollywood movie premieres. DJAMEDIA is the leading organizer of Nigerian and Nollywood movie premieres in the United Kingdom. Notable among such premieres it has produced and co-produced are Fifty, When Love Happens, The First Lady, The Figurine, The Mirror Boy, Anchor Baby, Bursting Out, Family on Fire, and Kiss & Tell. Other DJAMEDIA projects include football matches in the UK involving the Super Eagles, concerts, and comedy shows (Crack Ya Ribs UK).

== Recognition ==
Throughout his career, DJ Abass has been recognized for his contributions to the entertainment industry. He has received awards such as the Nigerian Music Awards UK's Entertainment Journalist of the Year in 2006 and the Smade Recognition Award in 2016 for his outstanding contribution to UK Afrobeats. His work has helped to popularize Nigerian music and culture internationally and provided a platform for African artists to reach wider audiences.

== Awards ==
- Smade Recognition Award 2016 – 'Outstanding Contribution to UK Afrobeats'
- Afrobeats Music Awards 2015 – 'Outstanding contribution to Afrobeats'
- African Film Awards 2014 – 'Entertainment Promoter of the Year'
- Nelawards Awards 2014 – 'Leadership & Mentoring in the Entertainment Industry'
- Beffta Awards 2011 – 'Entertainment Icon of the Year'
- The Diamond Special Recognition Awards UK 2011 – "Entertainment Personality of the Year'
- Africa Music Awards 2008- 'Club DJ of the Year'
- Nigerian Music Awards UK 2006 – 'Entertainment Journalist of the Year'
- AEPEG Awards 2006 – 'Outstanding Entertainment Personality of the Year'
- Academy of Creative Arts in Nigeria (ACAN) 2006 – Inducted as Honorary Member

== Other projects ==
- UK Nollywood Movie Premieres Organiser
- Wazobia Lounge at Africa Olympics Village London, 2012. Media and entertainment coordinator.
- Super Eagles vs. Black Stars of Ghana International Friendly in London, October 2011. Media Consultant.
- Kanu Heart Foundation UK Charity Gala 2006. Official DJ
- Intro Independence Tour: Napoli, Italy; London, UK; and Dublin, Ireland, 2005. Co-Producer.
- Intro Afro-Hip Hop Jam, Atlanta, US, 2005. Official DJ
- Big Nigerian Independence Intro Jam & Intro Summer Jam series, London, UK, 2003–2005. Co-producer with Ayo Shonaiya.
- Nigeria Corner Notting Hill Carnival London, UK 1986–Present. Founding participant of the famous Nigerian Corner at the annual Notting Hill Carnival in London. Co-organizer and official DJ from 1997 at the Cambridge Gardens site (except for 2007 and 2008, when the site was closed). DJ Abass is part of the team that resurrected the Nigeria Corner at the new site on Adela Road since 2009.

== Personal life ==
DJ Abass is married to Adenike and has two children—Toby and Tomi. He is a fan of Arsenal F.C., a team his father also supported. He lost his father, Alhaji Rasaq Kolawole Tijani, who died in his sleep on 23 June 2008 .

== See also ==
- List of Nigerian DJs
