= Mushin 2 Mo' Hits =

Studio album by Wande Coal
- Released: April 12, 2009
- Genre: R&B; afrobeats
- Length: 64:48
- Label: Mo' Hits
- Producer: Don Jazzy

Wande Coal chronology
Curriculum Vitae (2007)	Mushin 2 Mo' Hits (2009)	Wanted (2015)

Singles from Mushin 2 Mo' Hits
- 1. "Bumper 2 Bumper" Released: 26 November 2008

Mushin 2 Mo' Hits (abbreviated as M2M) is the debut studio album by Nigerian singer Wande Coal. It was released on April 12, 2009, under Mo' Hits Records. The album was entirely produced by Don Jazzy and it featured guest appearances from rapper Ikechukwu, and then-Mo' Hits acts D'banj, Dr SID, D'Prince, and K-Switch. The album has often been regarded as the most influential Nigerian debut album of all time. On October 24, 2022, Mushin 2 Mo' Hits was released on streaming platforms.

== Background ==
Wande Coal was first introduced to Mo' Hits Records in 2006, when he performed before D'banj and Don Jazzy during a campus event at the University of Lagos. The two were impressed by his performance and contacted him the next day to sign him to the label. He initially joined as a backup singer for D'banj, assisting him with backup vocals on songs like "Loke" and "Tono Sibe". Coal gained experience performing with the label's live band, later contributing to the Mo' Hits compilation album Curriculum Vitae (2007), appearing on every track on the album except two. Following the success of Curriculum Vitae, the label began work on Wande Coal's debut album Mushin 2 Mo' Hits.

== Singles ==
The album spawned one single, "Bumper 2 Bumper", released on 26 November 2008. The official music video, directed by Sesan, premiered on 18 August 2009, and features cameos from Sauce Kid, and D'banj, among others. The first version of the music video surfaced on the Internet without authorization in May 2009. A close associate of Wande Coal confirmed it was not the official video, clarifying that it was filmed for display at the M2M album launch. The song was nominated for Hottest Single of the Year at the 2009 Nigeria Entertainment Awards. For "Bumper 2 Bumper", Don Jazzy and Wande Coal received a nomination for Hit Producer Of The Year (As Used In A Music Video) at the 2010 SoundCity Music Video Awards.

== Critical reception ==
Professional ratings
Review scores
Source	Rating
Nigerianhiphop.net	3/5 stars
360nobs	8.1/10
Pulse Nigeria	9.6/10

Oluwaseun Pelemo of Nigerianhiphop.net called Mushin 2 Mo' Hits "a great debut and no doubt an awesome kickstarter for Wande's futuristic career." Praising Wande Coal's "well thought-out" flow and Don Jazzy's production, he concluded that it "remains an album worth having" and ended the review of with a rating of 3/5. 360nobs' Oye Akideinde praised Mushin 2 Mo' Hits as a strong debut that showed Wande Coal's vocal range and Don Jazzy's production. He rated the album a 8.1/10 and concluded, "With a much anticipated album, Wande & Don Jazzy create the perfect ‘safe’ chemistry for another successful Mo’ Hits album." In a retrospective review of the album for Pulse Nigeria, Ayomide Tayo called it a transformative album that redefined Nigerian pop music, praising Wande Coal's "syrupy flow and angelic voice" and Don Jazzy's "enchanting" production. With a rating of 4.5/5, he declared the album "the greatest vocal pop album of our generation." Also reviewing for Pulse Nigeria, Motolani Alake rated it a 9.6/10 and declared it "the best Nigerian album over the past 10 years".

Wonu Osikoya of The Native described the album as timeless and life-changing, showcasing Wande Coal's storytelling and emotional depth. He concluded, "Experiencing Mushin 2 Mo' Hits definitely shaped my view on music today and it is the album’s evergreen quality that has made him such a respected veteran in the game." Conrad Johnson-Omodiagbe of Zikoko stated that "Wande Coal and Don Jazzy created something special with Mushin 2 Mo' Hits. Revisiting it all these years later makes it an even more profound body of work. Wande has been and will always be the GOAT. Period." A writer from Album Talks defined Mushin 2 Mo' Hits as a landmark Afrobeats album that "featured bangers, bops, and ballads in nigh-perfect measure," praising its mix of sensuality, emotion, and gratitude, while noting it "created a sonic template for a generation of Nigerian pop acts." The reviewer concluded that "at age 23, Wande Coal crafted one of the most influential Afrobeats albums of all time." In Dami Ajayi's review for The Lagos Review, he praised the album's "lush, sultry, and subversive dancehall" and its "restive tenor and cheeky songwriting", that "Wande Coal's legacy is secure". In a review for Nigerian Entertainment Today, Damilare Abioye saw the album as a versatile and emotionally rich project that set a new standard for Nigerian pop music and remained influential over a decade later.

=== Accolades ===
Year	Awards ceremony	Award description(s)	Recipient	Results	Ref
2010	Hip Hop World Awards	Best R&B/Pop Album	Mushin 2 Mo' Hits	Won	
2010	Hip Hop World Awards	Album of the Year	Mushin 2 Mo' Hits	Won	
2010	Hip Hop World Awards	Song of the Year	"You Bad" (featuring D'banj)	Nominated	
2010	Hip Hop World Awards	Best Pop Single	"You Bad" (featuring D'banj)	Won	
2010	Hip Hop World Awards	Best Vocal Performance (Male)	Wande Coal for "Bananas"	Nominated	
2010	Hip Hop World Awards	Artiste of the Year	Wande Coal for Mushin 2 Mo' Hits	Won	
2010	Hip Hop World Awards	Hip Hop World Revelation of the Year	Wande Coal for Mushin 2 Mo' Hits	Won	

== Track listing ==
All tracks produced by Don Jazzy.

Mushin 2 Mo' Hits track listing
No.	Title	Writer(s)	Length
1.	"I Know You Like It"	Oluwatobi Ojosipe	3:10
2.	"You Bad" (featuring D'banj)	Ojosipe; Dapo Oyebanjo	4:05
3.	"Se Na Like This"	Ojosipe	4:12
4.	"Kiss Your Hands" (featuring Ikechukwu)	Ojosipe; Ikechukwu Onunaku	3:54
5.	"Confused" (featuring D'banj)	Ojosipe; D. Oyebanjo	4:20
6.	"Se Ope"	Ojosipe	3:22
7.	"Now It's All Gone" (featuring D'Prince)	Ojosipe; Charles Enebeli	4:24
8.	"Bumper 2 Bumper"	Ojosipe	3:44
9.	"Who Born The Maga" (featuring K-Switch)	Ojosipe; Kehinde Oyebanjo	3:04
10.	"That's Wots Up"	Ojosipe	4:42
11.	"Bananas" (featuring Dr SID)	Ojosipe; Sidney Esiri	3:58
12.	"Taboo"	Ojosipe	4:24
13.	"Jehovah"	Ojosipe	4:01

Bonus tracks
No.	Title	Writer(s)	Length
14.	"Ololufe"	Ojosipe	4:55
15.	"Ten Ten" (featuring Mo' Hits All Stars)	Ojosipe; Esiri; Enebeli; K. Oyebanjo	3:46
16.	"My Grind" (featuring Mo' Hits All Stars)	Ojosipe; Esiri; Enebeli; K. Oyebanjo	4:47
Total length:			64:48

== Release history ==
Release history and formats for Mushin 2 Mo' Hits
Region	Date	Format	Label	Ref.
Nigeria	12 April 2009	CD	Mo' Hits	
Various	6 June 2009	Digital download	51 Lex	
Various	21 October 2022	Streaming	Black Diamond	
