= Siduction =

2013 studio album by Dr Sid

Studio album by Dr Sid
- Released: 20 December 2013
- Recorded: 2012–2013
- Studio: Mavin Records Studio
- Genre: Afrobeats; afro pop; pop
- Length: 60:50 (standard edition); 73:15 (deluxe edition)
- Label: Mavin
- Producer: Don Jazzy; Altims; Baby Fresh; BlayzeBeats

Dr Sid chronology
Turning Point (2010)	Siduction (2013)	The Interesting EP (2020)

Singles from Siduction
- 1. "Lady Don Dada" Released: 3 May 2013; 2. "Love Mine" Released: 5 May 2013; 3. "Talented" Released: 13 May 2013; 4. "Baby Tornado" Released: 21 August 2013; 5. "Baby Tornado (Remix)" Released: 16 September 2013; 6. "Surulere" Released: 12 November 2013; 7. "Kilon Wa" Released: 20 February 2014

Siduction is the second studio album by Nigerian pop singer Dr Sid. It was released on 20 December 2013 by Mavin Records. The album features guest appearances from Don Jazzy, Tiwa Savage, Ice Prince, Alexandra Burke, and Emma Nyra. It was primarily produced by Don Jazzy, along with additional production from Baby Fresh, Altims, and BlayzeBeats. The album was supported by the singles "Lady Don Dada", "Love Mine", "Talented", "Baby Tornado", "Baby Tornado (Remix)", "Surulere" and "Kilon Wa". Its deluxe edition was released on 23 December 2013, and features collaborations with Wizkid, Sarkodie, Phyno, E.L and Lynxxx. Three extra singles were released from the deluxe edition, the three being, "Afefe", "Chocolate (West African Remix)" and "Surulere (Remix)".

== Background and promotion ==
On 14 October 2013, Mavin Records officially revealed the tracklist to Siduction. According to Dr Sid via an official press release, the meaning of the name Siduction is "an infusion of Dr Sid's persona into the word 'seduction' and is defined as 'The art of charming someone and appealing to their senses through Dr Sid's music'". On 15 October 2013, Dr SID released promo photos to promote the album.

== Singles ==
The album's lead single, "Lady Don Dada" features vocals and production from Don Jazzy. It was released on 3 May 2013. The second single, "Love Mine" was released just three days after "Lady Don Dada". "Love Mine" was produced by Don Jazzy and the music video for "Love Mine" was released on 12 July 2013 and directed by Mr. Moe Musa. The third single, "Talented" was released on 13 May 2013 and was produced by Don Jazzy. The music video for "Talented" was released on 13 August 2013 and was directed by Mr. Moe Musa. The fourth single, "Baby Tornado", was produced by Don Jazzy and released on 21 August 2013. The remix of "Baby Tornado" ended up being the fifth single and featured Alexandra Burke. The remix was released on 16 September 2013, and the music video for the remix was released on 2 June 2014 and directed by OlehBuckman Productions. The sixth single, "Surulere" features vocals from Don Jazzy and was produced by Don Jazzy. The music video for "Surulere" was released on 23 January 2014 and was directed by Daniel Ugo. "Surulere" was nominated for Song of the Year, Best Collaboration and Best Pop Single at The Headies 2014, Hottest Single of the Year at the 2014 Nigeria Entertainment Awards, and Video of the Year at 2014 Channel O Music Video Awards. The remix of "Surulere" features extra vocals from Wizkid and Phyno and was released on 20 December 2013. The seventh and final single is "Kilon Wa". The song and music video was released on 20 February 2014 and the music video was directed by Daniel Ugo.

=== Extra music videos and remixes ===
On 24 December 2014, Dr Sid released the music video to the song "Oyari" featuring Tiwa Savage. The video was directed by Nic Roux. Then, later, on 10 April 2015, he released the music video for "Last Bus Stop" using clips from his wedding with Simi Esiri. On 6 May 2015, a remix of "Chop Ogbono" was released featuring Olamide, and the music video was released the same day.

== Critical reception ==
The album received mixed reviews from critics. Ayomide Tayo of Nigerian Entertainment Today rated the album a 2.5 out of 5, saying that it "has the flaw of having a one-sided approach", although "by using what he has to his disposal (mainly Don Jazzy) he has delivered an adventurous album that is realistic and honest. It is not a classic, it is not great, but it is what you would expect from Dr. Sid", Tayo concluded. Wilfred Okiche of YNaija did not like the album, saying that "the last thing that 'Siduction' does is seduce anybody and one does not come off with a deeper knowledge of Dr Sid. It achieves other purposes instead. It annoys, it infuriates and then it bores."

== Track listing ==
Siduction track listing
No.	Title	Writer(s)	Producer(s)	Length
1.	"Surulere" (featuring Don Jazzy)	Sidney Esiri; Michael Ajereh	Don Jazzy	3:52
2.	"Princess Kate"	Esiri	Don Jazzy; Baby Fresh	3:21
3.	"Nwayi Oma" (featuring Emma Nyra)	Esiri; Emma Obi	Don Jazzy	3:46
4.	"Lady Don Dada"	Esiri; Ajereh	Don Jazzy	3:48
5.	"The "D""	Esiri	Don Jazzy	3:07
6.	"Talented"	Esiri	Don Jazzy	3:51
7.	"The Chicken and the Egg" (featuring Don Jazzy)	Esiri; Ajereh	Don Jazzy	3:15
8.	"Oyari" (featuring Tiwa Savage)	Esiri; Tiwatope Savage	Don Jazzy	3:22
9.	"Dr. Lover" (featuring Ice Prince)	Esiri; Panshak Zamani	Don Jazzy	3:30
10.	"Baby Tornado"	Esiri; Ajereh	Don Jazzy	3:58
11.	"Kilon Wa"	Esiri	Altims	3:51
12.	"Chop Ogbono"	Esiri	Don Jazzy	2:40
13.	"Love Mine"	Esiri	Don Jazzy	3:54
14.	"Get Over Me"	Esiri	Altims	3:45
15.	"Last Bus Stop"	Esiri	BlayzeBeats	3:52
16.	"Siduction"	Esiri	Altims	3:00
17.	"Baby Tornado" (remix; featuring Alexandra Burke)	Esiri; Burke	Don Jazzy	3:58
Total length:				60:50

Deluxe edition bonus tracks
No.	Title	Writer(s)	Producer(s)	Length
18.	"Surulere" (remix; featuring Don Jazzy, Wizkid and Phyno)	Esiri; Ajereh; Ayodeji Balogun; Chibuzor Azubuike	Don Jazzy	4:14
19.	"Chocolate" (remix; featuring Sarkodie, Ice Prince, E.L and Lynxxx)	Esiri; Michael Addo; Zamani; Elom Adablah; Chukie Edozien	Don Jazzy	4:19
20.	"Afefe (Breeze)"	Esiri	BlayzeBeats	3:52
Total length:				73:15

== Personnel ==
- Dr SID – primary artist
- Tiwa Savage – featured artist
- Lynxxx – featured artist
- Ice Prince – featured artist
- Emma Nyra – featured artist
- Don Jazzy – featured artist
- Phyno – featured artist
- E.L – featured artist
- Sarkodie – featured artist
- Wizkid – featured artist
- Alexandra Burke – featured artist
- Don Jazzy – producer
- Altims – producer
- BlayzeBeats – producer
- Baby Fresh – producer
- Tee-Y Mix – mixing engineer
- Mr. Moe Musa – video director
- Daniel Ugo – video director

== Release history ==
Release history and formats for Siduction
Region	Date	Format	Label
Various	20 December 2013	CD; digital download	Mavin
