= Surulere (song) =

2013 single by Dr SID

Single by Dr SID featuring Don Jazzy

from the album Siduction
- Released: November 13, 2013
- Recorded: 2013
- Genre: Afropop
- Length: 3:05
- Label: Mavin Records
- Songwriters: Sidney Onoriode Esiri; Michael Collins Ajereh
- Producer: Don Jazzy

Dr SID singles chronology
"Baby Tornado (Remix)" (2013)	"Surulere" (2013)	"Kilon Wa" (2014)

Music video
- "Surulere" on YouTube

"Surulere" (Yoruba: "Patience is Rewarding" or "Patience is Profitable") is a song by Nigerian singer Dr SID. It was released on November 13, 2013, as the lead single from his second studio album, Siduction (2013). Don Jazzy produced the song and was featured on it. "Surulere" peaked at number one on MTV Base's Official Naija Top 10 chart for the week of March 21 through March 27, 2014. It also peaked at number two on the Pulse Nigeria Music Video chart. "Surulere" won Best Collabo of the Year at the 2014 City People Entertainment Awards and was nominated for Song of the Year at both The Headies 2014 and MTV Africa Music Awards 2014.

== Background ==
"Surulere" translates to "Patience is Rewarding" or "Patience is Profitable". In a nutshell, the song is a reflection of Dr SID's musical journey. While on the set of MTV Base's Official Naija Top 10 chart in March 2014, Dr SID said "Surulere" represents one's desire to achieve their goals and aspirations. He also said the song's music video addresses the need for patience among parents who pressurized their children to have kids right after marriage.

In January 2014, Dr SID's fans began uploading pictures of themselves transitioning from grass to grace and tagged their pictures with the hashtag "Surulere". Musicians such as Tiwa Savage, Don Jazzy, Jude Engees Okoye, Wizkid, Banky W., D'Prince and Ice Prince also uploaded pictures of themselves to social media.

== Music video ==
The music video for "Surulere" was uploaded to YouTube on January 23, 2014, and features Don Jazzy and Dr SID dancing in front of an undisclosed house. The video stars Funke Akindele, Helen Paul and Blossom Chukwujekwu, and tells the story of a young couple who struggles with childbearing. Despite Chukwujekwu's mother (Akindele) attempt at ending her son's marriage, the couple overcame the stigma of childbearing that young couples often experience. The video for "Surulere" was ranked fourth on YouTube's most watched Nigerian videos for the first quarter of 2014.

== Reception ==
=== Critical reception ===
"Surulere" received positive reviews from music critics. Uche Briggs of YNaija praised the song's hook and said it "has a flavour that reminds one of Yam and palm oil – with salt, of course". On the contrary, the music video for "Surulere" received lukewarm reviews. Jim Donnett called the video "vanity" and said it "mirrors nothing close to the patience virtue."

=== Accolades ===
Year	Awards ceremony	Award description(s)	Results	Ref
2014	The Headies	Best Pop Single	Nominated	
2014	The Headies	Song of the Year	Nominated	
2014	Channel O Music Video Awards	Most Gifted West	Nominated	
2014	Channel O Music Video Awards	Most Gifted Video of the Year	Nominated	
2014	Nigeria Entertainment Awards	Hottest Single of the Year	Nominated	
2014	City People Entertainment Awards	Best Collabo of the Year	Won	
2014	MTV Africa Music Awards	Song of the Year	Nominated	
2014	African Muzik Magazine Awards	Best Collabo	Nominated	
2015	COSON Song Awards	The Song of Songs	Nominated	

== Live performances ==
Dr SID and Don Jazzy performed the song for the second time at the Fire of Zamani album launch concert, which took place at the Eko Hotel and Suites on November 23, 2013. On April 20, 2014, Dr SID performed "Surulere" at the Easter edition of AY Live. In May 2014, he performed "Surulere" with Phyno at the 2014 edition of Star Music Trek.

== Surulere (Remix) ==
"Surulere (Remix)"

Remix by Dr SID featuring Don Jazzy, Wizkid, and Phyno

from the album Siduction
- Released: December 20, 2013
- Recorded: November 2013
- Genre: Afropop
- Length: 4:14
- Label: Mavin Records
- Songwriters: Sidney Onoriode Esiri; Michael Collins Ajereh; Ayodeji Balogun; Azubuike Chibuzo Nelson
- Producer: Don Jazzy

The official remix of "Surulere" features guest vocals from Don Jazzy, Wizkid and Phyno. It appeared on the Siduction album and is a deviation from Dr SID's usual themes of love, romance and sex. The song was also produced by Don Jazzy and recorded in November 2013, at the Mavin Headquarters in Lekki, Lagos.

=== Critical reception ===
The remix of "Surulere" received mixed reviews from music critics. Jim Donnett of YNaija applauded Phyno for giving "a self composed, on point delivery and in his expected local dialect", but ended up criticizing Wizkid for sounding "a bit rushed, losing timing on the beat, and clashing harmonies with Don Jazzy". A writer for Fuse.com.ng awarded the song 3 stars out of 5, commending its production while also stating that it would have been exceptional if Wizkid's verse was omitted altogether. The website GTCrea8 criticized Wizkid and Phyno's inclusion on the track and said it "sounded like a rush job."

=== Accolades ===
Year	Awards ceremony	Award description(s)	Results	Ref
2014	World Music Awards	Africa's World Best Song	Nominated	

== Covers and remixes ==
- Digital download
1. "Surulere" (Official remix featuring Don Jazzy, Wizkid and Phyno) - 4:19
2. "Surulere" (Tiwa Savage remix)
