= Fall in Love (D'banj song) =

Single by D'banj

from the album The Entertainer
- Released: 8 July 2008
- Recorded: 2008
- Genre: Afrobeats; afropop
- Length: 4:04
- Label: Mo' Hits
- Songwriter: Dapo Oyebanjo
- Producer: Don Jazzy

D'banj singles chronology
"Igwe" (2008)	"Fall in Love" (2008)	"Critical" (2009)

Music video
- "Fall in Love" on YouTube

"Fall in Love" is a song by Nigerian singer and harmonica player D'banj. Produced by Don Jazzy, it serves as the third single from his third studio album The Entertainer (2008). According to the website Africa Review, the song earned D'banj national stardom in Nigeria. "Fall in Love" was nominated for Song of the Year at The Headies 2009. The music video for the song won Most Gifted Afro Pop Video at the 2010 Channel O Music Video Awards. Moreover, the video was nominated for the Best Male Music Video of the Year at the 2010 Nigeria Entertainment Awards.

== Music videos ==
There were two music videos released for the song. The 2010 Face of Africa finalists are featured in the first music video, which was released on January 26, 2010. The finalists selected for the video were told to play various video vixen characters, including "Rock Chick", "Russian Princess", and "Harajuku Girl". Mo' Hits Records decided to shoot another music video after the first one received negative reviews from critics who felt it didn't complement the song. Moreover, a critics thought the video was a bit naive to hire models to play the role of vixens.

On May 4, 2010, the second music video with Nollywood actress Genevieve Nnaji was released. Nollywood Watch reported that Nnaji was paid ₦2 million for the role she played in the music video. Prior to the video's release, there were reports about a romance between Nnaji and D'banj. In an interview with Toolz on NdaniTV's The Juice, D'banj confirmed the report surrounding his affair with the actress and said they were in a brief relationship.

== Live performances ==
D'banj and Don Jazzy performed the song together at the former's sister wedding ceremony for the first time since splitting.

== Accolades ==
Year	Awards ceremony	Award description(s)	Results
2009	Hip Hop World Awards	Song of the Year	Nominated
2010	Channel O Music Video Awards	Most Gifted Afro Pop Video	Won
2010	Nigeria Entertainment Awards	Best Male Music Video of the Year (Artist & Director)	Nominated
