= Bumper to Bumper =

Bumper to Bumper may refer to:

- Bumper to Bumper, 1995 album by Stroke 9
- "Bumper to Bumper", 1996 song by the Spice Girls released as the B-side to the single "Wannabe"
- "Bumper 2 Bumper", a single by Wande Coal from Mushin 2 Mo' Hits
