= Dr Sid =

Nigerian singer (born 1980)

Dr SID
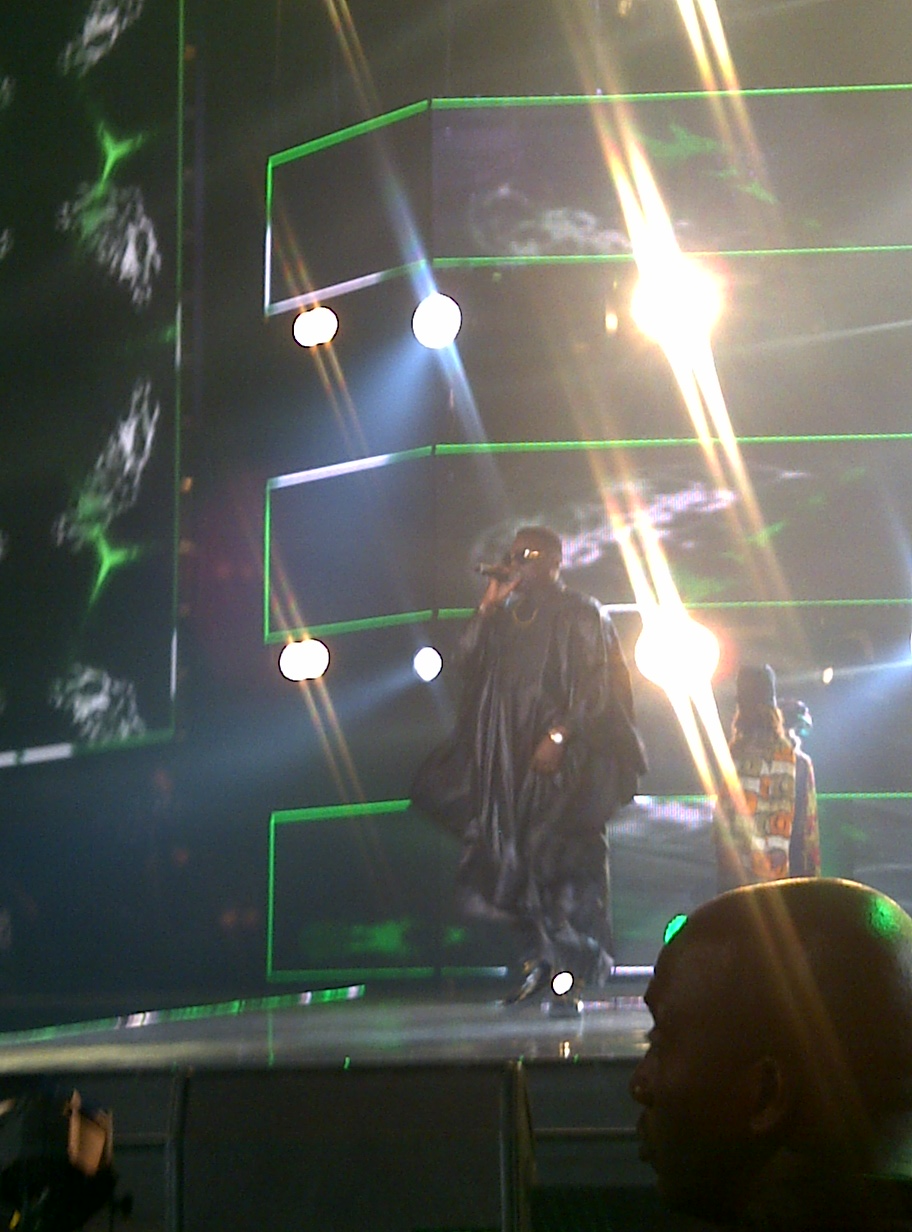
- Dr SID performing at MTV Africa Music Awards 2014

Background information
- Born: Sidney Onoriode Esiri; 1 May 1980 (age 46); Ikeja, Lagos State, Nigeria
- Genres: Afrobeats
- Occupations: Singer, songwriter, rapper
- Years active: 2002–present
- Labels: Trybe Records, Mo' Hits Records, Mavin Records
- Website: iamdrsid.com

Sidney Onoriode Esiri (born 1 May 1980), professionally known as Dr Sid, stylized as Dr SID, is a Nigerian singer.

== Early life ==
Dr Sid is from Delta State. He was born and raised in Lagos. His mother is a fashion designer and his father, Justus Esiri, was an actor. His father was a Member of the Order of the Niger (MON) and is known for his role in the village headmaster, a Nigerian sitcom popular in the 1980s. The second child of four children, from an early age, Dr Sid had his heart set on becoming an entertainer. However, his life took a different course. After graduating from the Nigerian Air force secondary school Ikeja, Sid went on to the University of Ibadan to study dentistry and dental surgery. During his school years, he took part in school plays, dance competitions, and concerts winning numerous awards along the way.

== Career ==
=== 1999 ===
Dr Sid signed on to a fresh new record label Trybe Records (who released the Nigerian hip hop group Trybesmen) as a choreographer. He would spend the next three years touring as a backup dancer for the Trybesmen.

=== 2002 ===
Dr Sid got his chance in front of the mic, when he was made a member of Da Trybe, and given a spot on the song that caused a revolution in Nigerian Hip-hop, "Oya" in 2002 alongside Sasha, 2-Shotz, Timi, DEL, and the Trybesmen (Eldee, Kb and Freestyle). Over the next year Sid recorded his debut single "Don't Stop" and had the number 1 video on the MBI top ten for 8 weeks, His music career had to be put on hold as he had to take a year out to finish up his university degree.

=== 2004 ===
Dr Sid became a qualified dentist. He moved to the UK working with the likes of JJC & the 419 squad, Felix Duke, KAS, R70, D'prince, D'Banj. Returning to Nigeria he spent the Next year working at Lagos University Teaching Hospital, and then went on to serve his country at Yola in Adamawa state. He also worked at various dental clinics combining dentistry and music.

=== 2005 ===
He started recording a studio album titled Prognosis which featured the single "Raise da roof". He was nominated in the Best New Act category at the 2005 Amen Awards. He abandoned the album in 2006.

=== 2007 ===
Dr Sid quit practicing as a dentist after three years and decided to concentrate fully on his music career signing on to Don Jazzy's Mo' Hits Records and records the Mo' Hits Allstars collective album Curriculum Vitae (CV) which was released in December 2007. He featured on 7 of the 15 tracks released on the album, which include "Booty Call" and "Close to you".

=== 2008 ===
Dr Sid spent most of 2008 touring with the Mo Hits Allstars, and performing at some of the major concerts, including the Thisday Music Festival and Star Mega Jam.

=== 2009 ===
Dr SID started recording his first studio album as a solo artist under Mo' Hits Records with producer Don Jazzy. The first single of the album Turning Point was titled "Something About You" and was released in September 2009 and is currently moving up the African charts alongside two other Winchi Winchi ft Wande Coal and Pop Something ft D'banj. He also performed at the MTV Africa Music Awards in Kenya as a member of the Mo' Hits Allstars alongside D'banj, Wande Coal and Kenyan artist STL.

=== 2010–2011 ===
Mo' Hits Records release Dr Sid's debut album Turning Point on 11 April Dr Sid New Single off Turning Point, "Over the Moon", hits number 1 on Nigerian top 10.

=== 2012 ===
Following a fall out of the partners at Mo' Hits Records, D'banj and Don Jazzy, Dr Sid has since signed on to Don Jazzy's Mavin Records. He also had three songs from his upcoming album featured on a Mavin Records compilation album titled: Solar Plexus.

=== 2013 ===
Dr Sid released his sophomore album titled Siduction on 20 December 2013. The album featured guest appearances from Tiwa Savage, Ice Prince, Emma Nyra, Alexandra Burke, Phyno and Wizkid. The album had song production from Baby Fresh, Don Jazzy and BlayzeBeats.

=== 2014 ===
Dr. Sid starred in Moses Inwang's 'The Last 3 Digits'. He starred an NYSC Corp Member and a friend to Nonso Diobi in the film. It won the People's Film Festival's Best International Film award in Paris, France. Dr Sid performed his hit single Surulere Live on the MTV Africa Music award stage in Durban.

== Discography ==
=== Studio albums ===
- 2010 Turning Point
- 2013 Siduction

=== Singles ===
caption
| Year | Song title | Featured artist | Producer | Album/Single Title |
|---|---|---|---|---|
| 2013 | Chocolate West African Remix | Ice Prince, Sarkodie, Elom Adablah, and Lynxxx | Don Jazzy | Chocolate The Remixes |
| 2013 | Chocolate East African Remix | Musik Maestro | Don Jazzy | Chocolate The Remixes |
| 2012 | Afefe | | Blayze Beats | Siduction |
| 2013 | Lady Don Dada | | Don Jazzy | Siduction |
| 2013 | Love Mine | | Don Jazzy | Siduction |
| 2013 | Talented | | Don Jazzy | Siduction |
| 2013 | Baby Tornado | | Don Jazzy | Siduction |
| 2013 | Baby Tornado Remix | Alexandra Burke | Don Jazzy | Siduction |
| 2013 | Surulere | Don Jazzy | Don Jazzy | Siduction |
| 2013 | Oyari | Tiwa Savage | Don Jazzy | Siduction |
| 2015 | Kabiyesi | featuring Don Jazzy | Don Jazzy | Single |
| 2016 | The Best | | Don Jazzy | single |
| 2016 | Flawless | Korede Bello | Don Jazzy | Single |
| 2017 | Greater Things | | Don Jazzy | Single |
| 2017 | We Up | | Altims | Single |
| 2017 | Jensimi | | Don Jazzy | Single |
| 2018 | Open and Close | | Don Jazzy and Altims | Single |
| 2018 | Softly | Solidstar | P.Banks | Single |
| 2018 | 40 Bottles | Dj Big N, Special Ed, Shody, Do2dtun | Princeton | Single |
| 2019 | Deep Down | Seyi Shay | Altims | Single |
| 2019 | Good Time | | Ozedikus | Single |

=== As featured artist on compilation albums ===
- 2004: The Big Picture
- 2007: Curriculum Vitae
- 2012: Solar Plexus

== Videography ==
| Year | Title | Director | Ref |
|---|---|---|---|
| 2002 | Don't Stop | Eldee | —N/a |
| 2009 | Something About You | Sesan Ogunro | —N/a |
| 2010 | Over the moon | Dj Tee | —N/a |
| | Pop Something ft D'banj | Walter Banger | —N/a |
| 2011 | bamijo ft eldee, Ikechukwu and M.I | Sesan Ogunro | —N/a |
| 2013 | When this song comes on | —N/a | —N/a |
| 2012 | Afefe | Sesan Ogunro | —N/a |
| 2013 | Baby Tornado ft Alexandra Burke | Olehbuckman Productions | —N/a |
| | Love Mine | Mr Moe Musa | —N/a |
| | talented | Mr Moe Musa | —N/a |
| 2014 | Work It ft Navio | —N/a | |
| | Surulere ft Don Jazzy | Daniel Ugo | —N/a |
| 2015 | Kabiyesi (feat. Don Jazzy) | Dr Sid and Adasa Cookey | —N/a |
| 2016 | If I Start to talk ft Tiwa Savage | Clarence Peters | —N/a |
| | The Best | Clarence Peters | —N/a |
| | Flawless ft Korede Bello | Lavinia Noel | —N/a |
| 2017 | Jensimi | Dr SID and Paul Gambit | —N/a |
| 2018 | Open and Close | Dr Sid | —N/a |
| 2019 | Good Time | Unlimited L.A | —N/a |

== Awards and nominations ==
| Year | Awards ceremony | Award description(s) | Results |
|---|---|---|---|
| 2008 | Soundcity Music Video Awards | Fresh Video | Won |
| 2009 | Nigerian Music Video Awards | Best Afro Hip Hop Video | Won |
| 2011 | The Headies | Revelation of the year | Won |
| | | Best R&B/Pop Album | Nominated |
| | | Best Pop Single | Won |
| | | Song of the Year | Nominated |
| | | Album of the year | Nominated |
| 2014 | The Headies | Song of the year | Nominated |
| | | Best Collabo | Nominated |
| | | Best Pop Single | Nominated |
| | MTV Africa Music Awards | Song of the year | Nominated |
| | City People Entertainment Awards | Best Collaboration | Won |

== Filmography ==
caption
| Year | Project | Role | Director |
|---|---|---|---|
| 2014 | Last 3 Digits | Benji | Moses Inwang |
| 2015 | The Application | Director | Sidney Esiri |
| 2019 | Nigerian Trade | | Jade Osiberu |

== See also ==
- Afrobeat
- African hip hop
- Nigerian hip hop
- Lagos
