= Undeniable (eLDee album) =

Studio album by eLDee
- Released: 1 July 2012
- Genre: Afro pop
- Length: 42:48
- Label: Trybe
- Producer: Sarz; Cobhams Asuquo; Tee-Y Mix; eLDee

ELDee chronology
Is It Your Money? Vol. 1 (2010)	Undeniable (2012)

Singles from Undeniable
- 1. "Higher" Released: 12 August 2011; 2. "Today-Today" / "Wash Wash" Released: 13 November 2011; 3. "Category" Released: 19 April 2012; 4. "We Made It" Released: 31 January 2013; 5. "Always (Temi's Song)" Released: 18 May 2013

Undeniable is the fifth studio album by Nigerian rapper eLDee. It was released through Trybe Records on 1 July 2012, and features guest appearances from artists Wizkid and Banky W., alongside Trybe Records acts Sojay and K9. The album's production was handled by Sarz, Cobhams Asuquo, Tee-Y Mix, and eLDee. It serves as a follow-up to Is It Your Money? Vol. 1 (2010).

== Background ==
eLDee first announced the release date for Undeniable as 31 March 2012, although it was later pushed back to July.

== Singles ==
The album's lead single "Higher" was released on 12 August 2011. It features his record label acts K9 and Sojay, and was produced by Sarz. "Higher" was initially promoted as the first single from an album called Is It Your Money? Vol. 2, which was then titled Undeniable. The dual second singles "Today-Today" and "Wash Wash" were released on 13 November 2011. "Today-Today" is a low-tempo wedding track while "Wash Wash" is an upbeat comedic track about lying. Both tracks were produced by Sarz, with "Today-Today" being co-produced by Tee-Y Mix and eLDee. "Category" was released as the album's third single on 19 April 2012. Produced by Sarz, "Category" interpolates Nigerian musician Fela Kuti's "Teacher Don't Teach Me Nonsense" on the hook. The album's fourth single "We Made It" featuring Sojay was released on 31 January 2013. It was produced by Cobhams Asuquo. The fourth and final single off Undeniable was released on 18 May 2013, entitled "Always (Temi's Song)". Produced by Sarz, it is a tribute to eLDee's daughter Temi Dabiri.

== Critical reception ==
Professional ratings
Review scores
Source	Rating
Nigerian Entertainment Today	3/5 stars
TayoTV	8.75/10

Ayomide Tayo of Nigerian Entertainment Today described Undeniable as a carefully structured and well-produced album that showcases the rapper's legacy and versatility. Praising tracks like "Higher" and "We Made It" for their nostalgic and lyrical depth, Tayo noted, "A true legend knows when to quit the game, and eLDee is leaving the stage when his contribution, influence, and legacy are undeniable." He rated the album 3.5/5. TayoTV's Teaponpi, praised Undeniable by eLDee as a tightly curated album filled with strong production, versatile performances, and standout collaborations, especially with Wizkid, Banky W, and his Trybe Records signees. Highlighting both lyrical depth and commercial appeal, the reviewer concluded, "Undeniable is the real definition of Quality over Quantity," and gave it a rating of 8.75/10.

== Track listing ==
Undeniable track listing
No.	Title	Writer(s)	Producer(s)	Length
1.	"Higher" (featuring K9 and Sojay)	Lanre Dabiri; Noble Ezeh; Samuel Okorie Jnr.	Sarz	4:12
2.	"Been There, Done That"	Dabiri	Sarz	3:30
3.	"Today-Today"	Dabiri	Sarz; eLDee; Tee-Y Mix	3:47
4.	"Always (Temi's Song)"	Dabiri	Sarz	4:31
5.	"Rundown" (featuring Banky W.)	Dabiri; Olubankole Wellington	Sarz	3:56
6.	"Transformer Love" (featuring K9 and Sojay)	Dabiri; Ezeh; Okorie	eLDee	1:55
7.	"Category"	Dabiri	Sarz	4:08
8.	"Wash Wash"	Dabiri	Sarz	3:52
9.	"Never Let You Go" (featuring Wizkid)	Dabiri; Ayodeji Balogun	Sarz	3:46
10.	"Zombie" (featuring K9)	Dabiri; Ezeh	Sarz	4:13
11.	"We Made It" (featuring Sojay)	Dabiri; Okorie	Cobhams Asuquo	4:58
Total length:				42:48

== Personnel ==
- Sarz — production
- Cobhams Asuquo — production
- Tee-Y Mix — production
- eLDee — production
- Fab Dupont — mixing

== Release history ==
Country/Digital platform	Date	Version	Format	Label
Nigeria; iTunes; Spinlet	1 July 2012	Standard	CD; digital download	Trybe
