= The Entertainer (D'banj album) =

Studio album by D'banj
- Released: July 26, 2008
- Recorded: 2008
- Genres: R&B; hip hop; Afrobeats
- Label: Mo' Hits
- Producer: Don Jazzy

D'banj chronology
RunDown Funk U Up (2006)	The Entertainer (2008)	D'Kings Men (2013)

Singles from The Entertainer
- 1. "Mo Gbono Feli Feli" Released: 14 April 2008; 2. "Igwe" Released: 30 June 2008; 3. "Fall in Love" Released: 8 July 2008

The Entertainer is the third studio album by Nigerian Afrobeats recording artist D'banj, released on 26 July 2008. Production on the album was handled by Don Jazzy. It features guest appearances from Wande Coal, Special Ed, and Kayswitch. It was supported by three singles—"Mo Gbono Feli Feli", "Igwe", and "Fall in Love". The album was named in reference to D'banj's skill as an entertainer. The album was a commercial success due largely to radio airplay, distribution, and marketing strategies.

== Background ==
Commenting on the album, D'banj said:

"I tried not to remind my listeners of the high level of unemployment, poverty, disease, electricity outage including the pains and all the troubles in this world. The concept is to keep it live and happy. All the songs are my personal experiences and journey through life. I hope to touch everyone with this album and I pray the people find it worthwhile."

== Singles ==
- The album's lead single, "Gbono Feli Feli" was released on 14 April 2008. Produced by Don Jazzy, the music video for the single was shot in London and directed by Sesan. The music video first aired on an episode of reality television show, Koko Mansion. Olamildent described the music video, saying: "In this new video, D'banj poses as the prince charming who rescues the damsel or should I say kokolette in distress." Upon its release, the song and its music video was met with positive reviews. Onos Ovueraye of Bellanaija, reflecting on the songs that shaped the Nigerian music industry, said: "This song and its video are like plot points in Nigerian pop culture. D’Banj and Don Jazzy didn’t take it easy on the music industry when this song came out. Mo Gbono Feli Feli took Nigeria by storm; the special effects and locations in the video were like none anyone had ever seen in the industry before, back then." M.I did a rap verse on the song's instrumental, which was included on his iLLegal Music mixtape (2009).
- "Igwe" was released on 30 June 2008 as the album's second single. A video uploaded to YouTube shows the Kokomaster performing "Igwe" with Wande Coal. D'banj also performed the song at the 2012 Hackney Weekend in London.
- On 8 July 2008, "Fall in Love" was released as The Entertainer's third and final single. "Fall in Love" was nominated for Song of the Year at The Headies 2009. The song's music video won the award for Most Gifted Afro Pop Video at the 2010 Channel O Music Video Awards. The video received a nomination for Best Male Music Video of the Year (Artist & Director) category at the 2010 Nigeria Entertainment Awards.
- According to Bellanaija, "the music video for "Suddenly" was shot on location at Chief Razak Okoya's ‘Oluwa Ni Ishola’ Estate and directed by Sesan Ogunro. It features D’Banj, a bevy of scantily clad women, Ikechukwu, Wande Coal, Don Baba J and the rest of the Mo Hits Crew."
- The music video for "Kimon" was directed by Sesan.

== Reception ==
The album was met with great reception throughout Africa, but performed best in Ghana and Nigeria. The tracks "Gbono Feli Feli", "Igwe", and "Suddenly" influenced Africa's nightlife. The song "Fall in Love" was also met with commercial success, getting the most airplay from the album.

=== Accolades ===
Year	Awards ceremony	Award description(s)	Results	Ref.
2009	Nigeria Entertainment Awards	Best Album of the Year	Won	
2009	Hip Hop World Awards	Best R&B/Pop Album	Nominated	
2009	Hip Hop World Awards	Album of the Year	Nominated	

== Track listing ==
All tracks produced by Don Jazzy.

The Entertainer track listing
No.	Title	Writer(s)	Length
1.	"Mo Gbono Feli Feli"	Dapo Oyebanjo	4:18
2.	"Kimon"	Oyebanjo	3:46
3.	"Celebrate" (featuring Wande Coal)	Oyebanjo; Oluwatobi Ojosipe	3:50
4.	"Olorun Maje"	Oyebanjo	4:52
5.	"Suddenly"	Oyebanjo	3:34
6.	"Fall in Love"	Oyebanjo	4:04
7.	"Gbelo Gbebo" (featuring Special Ed)	Oyebanjo	3:08
8.	"Igwe" (featuring Don Jazzy)	Oyebanjo; Michael Ajereh	3:50
9.	"If U Dey Crase" (featuring Kayswitch)	Oyebanjo; Kehinde Oyebanjo	3:51
10.	"Entertainer"	Oyebanjo	3:36

== Release history ==
Country	Date	Format	Label	Ref
Nigeria	July 26, 2008	CD	Mo' Hits	
Worldwide	May 18, 2009	Digital download	51 Lex	
