= Star Mega Jam =

Concerts in Nigeria

- Language: English

Origin
- Meaning: Local Wrestling
- Region of origin: Nigeria

The Star Mega Jam was a series of music concerts in Nigeria held annually from 2000 to 2010. Each year it was held in Lagos and Abuja.

Acts that played included Awilo Logomba, Shaggy, Usher, Koffi Olumide, 50 Cent, Ja Rule and Kevin Lyttle, LL Cool J and Akon, Kanye West, T-Pain, Nelly, Nas, Busta Rhymes and Ludacris.

The music festival was cancelled in 2011, with the organizers citing logistical challenges. It has not been held since.
