= Curriculum Vitae (album) =

Compilation album by Mo' Hits Records
- Released: 2007
- Recorded: 2006–2007
- Genre: Afropop
- Label: Mo' Hits Records
- Producer: Don Jazzy

Curriculum Vitae is a compilation album by recording artists of Nigerian record label Mo' Hits Records. It was released in December 2007, by the label. Nigerian record producer Don Jazzy first revealed plans for a label collaborative album in 2006. Curriculum Vitae was supported by the singles "Why Me" (Remix), "Pere", "Ololufe", "Booty Call", and "Move Your Body". It received positive reviews from music critics and was ranked seventh on Pulse Nigeria's list of the 15 Best Nigerian Pop albums ever released between 1999 and 2016.

== Background ==
Curriculum Vitae was recorded between 2005 and 2006. Produced entirely by Don Jazzy, the album was jointly recorded by Mo'Hits All Stars, a collective composed of D'banj, Wande Coal, Dr SID, D'Prince and Kayswitch. It was commercially successful and songs from the project continue to have cultural and pop relevance to date. Curriculum Vitae was made available for digital download on iTunes in 2009.

== Track listing ==
No.	Title	Writer(s)	Producer(s)	Length
1.	"Move Your Body" (featuring D'banj and Wande Coal)	Dapo Daniel Oyebanjo; Oluwatobi Wande Ojosipe	Don Jazzy	4:01
2.	"Be Close to You" (featuring D'banj, Wande Coal, Dr SID, and D'Prince)	Oyebanjo; Ojosipe; Sidney Onoriode Esiri; Charles Enebeli	Don Jazzy	3:43
3.	"What You Want Do To Me" (featuring D'banj, Wande Coal, Dr SID, and D'Prince)	Oyebanjo; Ojosipe; Michael Collins Ajereh	Don Jazzy	3:25
4.	"Why Me (Remix)" (featuring D'banj, Wande Coal, Don Jazzy)	Oyebanjo; Ojosipe; Ajereh	Don Jazzy	5:17
5.	"Ololufe" (featuring Wande Coal)	Ojosipe	Don Jazzy	4:51
6.	"Igbe Mi (My S***t)" (featuring D'Prince and D'banj)	Enebeli; Oyebanjo	Don Jazzy	5:37
7.	"Masquerade" (featuring D'banj, Wande Coal, and Don Jazzy)	Oyebanjo; Ojosipe; Ajereh	Don Jazzy	3:57
8.	"Hey Girl" (featuring Wande Coal, Don Jazzy, Dr SID, and D'Prince)	Ojosipe; Ajereh; Esiri; Enebeli	Don Jazzy	5:05
9.	"Pere" (featuring D'banj, Wande Coal, and Don Jazzy)	Oyebanjo; Ojosipe	Don Jazzy	4:13
10.	"Jasi" (featuring D'banj, Wande Coal, and Don Jazzy)	Oyebanjo; Ojosipe; Ajereh	Don Jazzy	2:49
11.	"No Long Thing" (featuring Dr SID and D'banj)	Esiri; Oyebanjo	Don Jazzy	3:13
12.	"Oh No" (featuring Wande Coal, Dr SID, K-Switch, D'Prince, and D'banj)	Ojosipe; Esiri; Kehinde Oladotun Oyebanjo; Enebeli; Oyebanjo	Don Jazzy	4:57
13.	"Anaconda" (featuring D'banj and Wande Coal)	Oyebanjo; Ojosipe	Don Jazzy	3:31
14.	"Booty Call" (featuring D'banj, Wande Coal, Dr SID, D'Prince, and K-Switch)	Oyebanjo; Ojosipe; Esiri; Enebeli; Oyebanjo	Don Jazzy	5:13
15.	"Stop the Violence" (featuring D'banj, Wande Coal, Dr SID, and D'Prince)	Oyebanjo; Ojosipe; Esiri; Enebeli	Don Jazzy	6:35

iTunes bonus tracks
No.	Title	Writer(s)	Producer(s)	Length
16.	"My Grind" (featuring Wande Coal, D'Prince, Dr SID, and K-Switch)	Ojosipe; Enebeli; Esiri; Oyebanjo	Don Jazzy	4:49
17.	"Ten Ten" (featuring Wande Coal, Dr SID, K-Switch, and D'Prince)	Ojosipe; Esiri; Oyebanjo; Enebeli	Don Jazzy	3:44

== Personnel ==
- Michael Collins Ajereh – executive producer, primary artist
- Dapo Daniel Oyebanjo – primary artist, writer
- Oluwatobi Wande Ojosipe – primary artist, writer
- Sidney Onoriode Esiri – primary artist, writer
- Charles Enebeli – primary artist, writer
- Kehinde Oladotun Oyebanjo – primary artist, writer

== Release history ==
Region	Date	Format	Label
Nigeria	December 2007	CD	Mo' Hits Records
Various	May 18, 2009	Digital download	Mo' Hits Records
