= RunDown Funk U Up =

Studio album by D'banj
- Released: 2006
- Genre: Dancehall; R&B; highlife
- Length: 69:30
- Label: Mo' Hits
- Producer: Don Jazzy

D'banj chronology
No Long Thing (2005)	RunDown Funk U Up (2006)	The Entertainer (2008)

Singles from RunDown Funk U Up
- 1. "Why Me"; 2. "Do You Like D Koko? (Tongolo Remix)"

RunDown Funk U Up is the second studio album by Nigerian recording artist D'banj. It was released by Mo' Hits Records in 2006. The album was produced by Don Jazzy, and supported by the singles "Why Me" and "Do You Like D Koko? (Tongolo Remix)".

== Singles ==
- "Do You Like the Koko? (Tongolo Remix)" is a single from this album. It is the successor to the hit single "Tongolo" off the No Long Thing album.
- "Why Me" is the lead single from this album. It won the "Song of the Year" award at the 2007 Hip Hip World Awards. It also won the "Hottest Single of the Year" award at the 2007 Nigeria Entertainment Awards. The music video for "Why Me" won the "Best Special Effects Video" award. It received the "Best African West Video" and "Best Male Video" nominations at the 2007 Channel O Music Video Awards. D'banj won the "Listener's Choice Award" at the 2008 MTV Africa Music Awards for the song.

== Accolades ==
Year	Awards ceremony	Award description(s)	Results
2007	Hip Hop World Awards	Best Pop Album	Nominated

== Track listing ==
All tracks written by Dapo "D'banj" Oyebanjo and produced by Michael "Don Jazzy" Ajereh.
No.	Title	Length
1.	"Do You Like the Koko? (Tongolo Remix)"	4:03
2.	"Why Me"	3:53
3.	"Run Down (Funk U Up)"	4:11
4.	"Loke"	4:10
5.	"Tono Sibe"	3:38
6.	"Which Way 2 Go?"	4:06

Bonus tracks
No.	Title	Length
7.	"Serve The Lord"	2:35
8.	"Run Down (F**K U Up)" (uncensored version)	4:12

No Long Thing bonus disc
No.	Title	Length
9.	"Tongolo"	4:08
10.	"Socor"	4:13
11.	"All the Way"	3:44
12.	"Mr Olopa"	4:25
13.	"Iya Mi"	5:06
14.	"Don't Ask Me"	3:45
15.	"Mobolowowon"	5:04
16.	"Ika O Da"	4:26
17.	"Na Lie"	3:51
Total length:		69:30

== Re-release history ==
Region	Date	Format	Label	Ref
Worldwide	18 May 2009	Digital download	Mo' Hits	
