= Mo' Hits Records =

Nigerian record label

Mo'Hits Records
- Founded: 2004
- Founder: Don Jazzy; D'banj
- Genre: Afrobeat
- Country of origin: Nigeria
- Official website: www.mohitsrecords.com

Mo'Hits Records (popularly called Mo'Hits) was a Nigerian record label founded in 2004 and jointly owned by D'banj and Don Jazzy. Don Jazzy was the CEO/President of the label and D'banj was its co-owner and first signed artist. The label was home to other artists such as Wande Coal, Dr SID, D'Prince, and K-Switch.

== History ==
Founded in 2004, the first album released by the label was D'banj's No Long Thing in 2005. Other albums are Rundown & The Entertainer (D'banj), Mushin2Mohits (Wande Coal) & Turning Point (Dr SID). The label has also released a compilation album called Mo'Hits All Stars. Don Jazzy has won various accolades including Nigeria Music Awards (NMA) Producer of the Year in 2006, and Nigeria Entertainment Awards Music Producer of the Year in 2007.

The label has also attracted foreign interest from international acts like Kanye West and Jay-Z and D'banj got signed to Kanye's GOOD Music.

The label is no longer in operation as Don Jazzy moved on to open Mavins Record Label and Dbanj started up DB record label.

== End ==
In March 2012, Don Jazzy confirmed using his Twitter account to announce that D'banj had left the group. D'Banj's reason for leaving was cited as difference in interests.

Don Jazzy went on to establish another record label known as Mavin Records.

== Post separation ==
After separation, Mo'hits artistes performed together for the first time on 27 December 2017 in the Davido show tagged "30Billion Concert".

== Artists ==
Act	Year signed	# Albums released under Mo' Hits
D'banj	2004	3
Wande Coal	2006	1
Dr SID	2007	1
D'PRINCE	2007	–
Kayswitch ‘D Produkt’	2007	–

== Discography ==
Year	Information
2005	D'banj - No Long Thing: Released:2005; Singles: "Tongolo", "Socor", "Mobolowowon"; Certification: —
2006	D'banj - RunDown Funk U Up: Released:2006; Singles: "Run Down", "Why Me", "Move Your Body"; Certification: —
2007	Mo' Hits All Stars - Curriculum Vitae: Released:2007; Singles: "Why Me (Remix)", "Pere", "Ololufe", "Booty Call", "Move Your Body"; Certification: —
2008	D'banj - The Entertainer: Released:2008; Singles: "Fall in Love", "Gbono Feli Feli", "Kimon", "Suddenly", "Entertainer", "Olorun Maje", "Igwe"; Certification: Platinum
2009	Wande Coal - Mushin 2 Mohits: Released:2008; Singles: "Bumper2Bumper", "You Bad", "Taboo", "Who Born The Maga"; Certification: —
2010	Dr SID - Turning Point: Released:2010; Singles: "Something About You", "Pop Something", "Over The Moon"; Certification: —
