= No Long Thing =

Studio album by D'banj
- Released: 25 March 2005
- Genre: R&B
- Length: 42:56
- Label: Mo' Hits
- Producer: Don Jazzy

D'banj chronology
No Long Thing (2005)	RunDown Funk U Up (2006)

Singles from No Long Thing
- 1. "Tongolo"; 2. "Socor"; 3. "Mobolowowon"

No Long Thing is the debut studio album by Nigerian recording artist D'banj. It was released by Mo' Hits Records on 25 March 2005. The album was produced by Don Jazzy, and supported by the singles "Tongolo", "Socor", and "Mobolowowon".

== Background and recording ==
Before launching his solo career, D'banj relocated from Nigeria to the United Kingdom, where he became associated with Backbone Music and worked alongside producer Don Jazzy. While in London, he toured with JJC & 419 Squad and gained experience performing at live events. In 2004, Don Jazzy established Mo' Hits Records and signed D'banj as the label's first artist. According to D'banj, the pair recorded No Long Thing within two weeks before returning to Nigeria. Prior to the album's release, D'banj had recorded songs including "Kiss Me Again" with Ruggedman, "One More Chance", and "Gba Si Be"

Several songs on the album were inspired by D'banj's personal experiences. He stated that "Mobolowowon" was based on his experiences living in London and the challenges faced by Nigerians abroad. The "Pastor" skit originated from an encounter with his mother and a pastor after he decided to pursue music rather than complete his engineering studies. D'banj also cited his late brother Femi Oyebanjo, whose harmonica he inherited following his death in a plane crash, as the inspiration behind his use of the instrument in his music.

== Singles ==
- The music video for "Tongolo" was directed by DJ Tee. It features a cameo appearance from Don Jazzy. D'banj won the Best Newcomer award at the 2006 Channel O Music Video Awards and the 2006 Fizz Awards for "Tongolo".
- The music video for "Socor" was also directed by DJ Tee. It also features a cameo appearance from Don Jazzy.
- The music video for "Mobolowowon" was also directed by DJ Tee. D'banj played the harmonica in the video.

== Track listing ==
All tracks are written by Dapo Oyebanjo, and produced by Don Jazzy.

No.	Title	Length
1.	"Intro"	1:35
2.	"Tongolo"	4:11
3.	"Socor"	4:11
4.	"Pastor (Skit)"	1:21
5.	"All Da Way"	2:46
6.	"Iya Mi"	5:08
7.	"Mr. Olopa"	4:27
8.	"Wiches (Skit)"	1:27
9.	"Mobolowowon"	5:05
10.	"Ika O Da"	4:03
11.	"Ask Me" (featuring Kween)	3:44
12.	"Na Lie" (featuring Nova & Raga Remi)	3:52

== Release history ==
Country	Date	Format	Label	Ref
Nigeria	25 March 2005	CD	Mo' Hits	
United Kingdom	20 June 2005	CD	Mo' Hits	
Worldwide	5 January 2008	Digital download	Blue Pie	
