= Trybesmen =

Nigerian hip-hop group

- Also known as: The Run DMC of Africa
- Origin: Lagos, Nigeria
- Genres: Hip hop
- Labels: Da Trybe, Storm Records
- Members: eLDee The Don olaDELe; T.K.O
- Past members: Freestyle; KaBoom

Trybesmen (also known as Da Trybe) is a Nigerian hip-hop group from Lagos, Nigeria. The Nigerian newspaper NEXT describes them as "one of the pioneers of hip hop in Nigeria" and the BBC called the group "legendary" in 2005.

The three original members, known as Eldee, Kaboom and Freestyle, first met in 1994 in Lagos. Their first album, L.A.G Style Volume 1., was released in 1999 and it received positive reviews. Their hits included "Trybal Marks" and "Shake Bodi." Two members, eLDee and Freestyle, recorded solo albums after the group broke up. They reunited to perform at an awards ceremony in Abuja in 2009.

== Members ==
=== Current members ===
- Eldee
- OlaDELe
- TKO
- 2 Shotz

=== Former members ===
- Freestyle
- KaBoom

== Trybesmen Solo Label ==
- Eldee: Trybe Records

== Discography ==
=== Albums ===
- 2000: L.A.G Style

=== Singles ===
- Trybal Marks
- Shake Bodi
