= Don Jazzy =

Nigerian record producer and singer (born 1982)

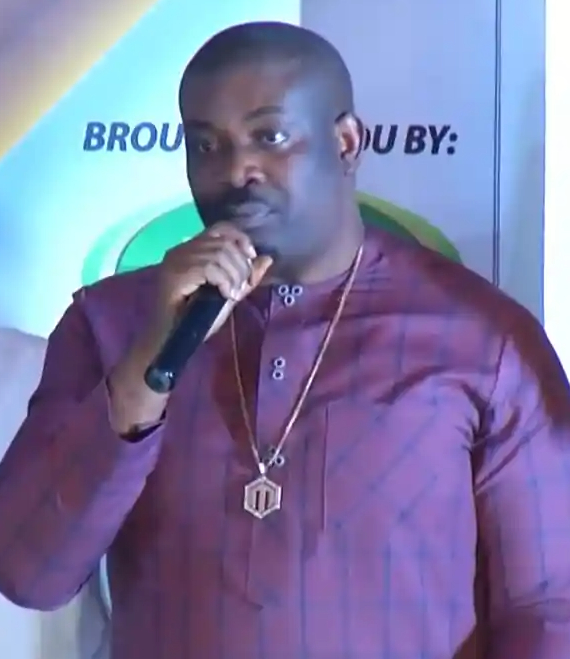
- Don Jazzy in 2018
- Born: Michael Collins Ajereh; 26 November 1982 (age 43); Umuahia, Abia State, Nigeria
- Citizenship: Nigerian
- Occupations: music executive; singer; songwriter; record producer; businessman; philanthropist
- Years active: 2002–present
- Spouse: Michelle Jackson (m. 2003; div. 2005)
- Relatives: D'Prince (brother); General Jay Mavin (brother); Joy Solano (sister)
- Musical career
- Origin: Delta, Nigeria
- Genres: Afrobeats; Afropop
- Instruments: Vocals; Keyboard
- Labels: Mo' Hits; Mavin; Very GOOD Beats
- Website: mavinrecords.com

Michael Collins Ajereh (born 26 November 1982), known professionally as Don Jazzy, is a Nigerian music executive, record producer, singer, songwriter, businessman, and philanthropist. He founded the record label Mavin Records in 2012, as a subsidiary of Mavin Global Holdings, through which he has signed artists including Rema, Ayra Starr, Magixx, Bayanni, Johnny Drille, Ladipoe, Lifesize Teddy, DJ Big N, and Boy Spyce. He co-founded Mo' Hits Records with D'banj in 2004, and was an in-house producer for Kanye West's GOOD Music from 2011 to 2013.

== Early life and education ==
Don Jazzy was born Michael Collins Ajereh in Umuahia, Abia State, on 26 November 1982, the son of Collins Enebeli Ajereh and Mrs Ajereh. His father is from Isoko in Delta State. His mother is an Igbo princess from Abia State and his father is a member of the Isoko people.

Ajereh's family moved to Ajegunle, Lagos, where Don Jazzy was raised. He was educated at the co-educational high school, Federal Government College Lagos. Don Jazzy found an interest in music early in life and at age 12, began to play the bass guitar and piano. He also gained knowledge of traditional and percussion instruments. Don Jazzy enrolled in business management and studied at the Ambrose Alli University, Ekpoma, Edo state.

In 2000, Jazzy's uncle invited him to play the drums for a local church in London and that was his first visit to London. Don Jazzy gained employment at McDonald's as a security guard. He continued his interest in music, associating with Solek, JJC Skillz, Kas, Jesse Jagz, The 419 Squad and D'Banj.

== Career ==
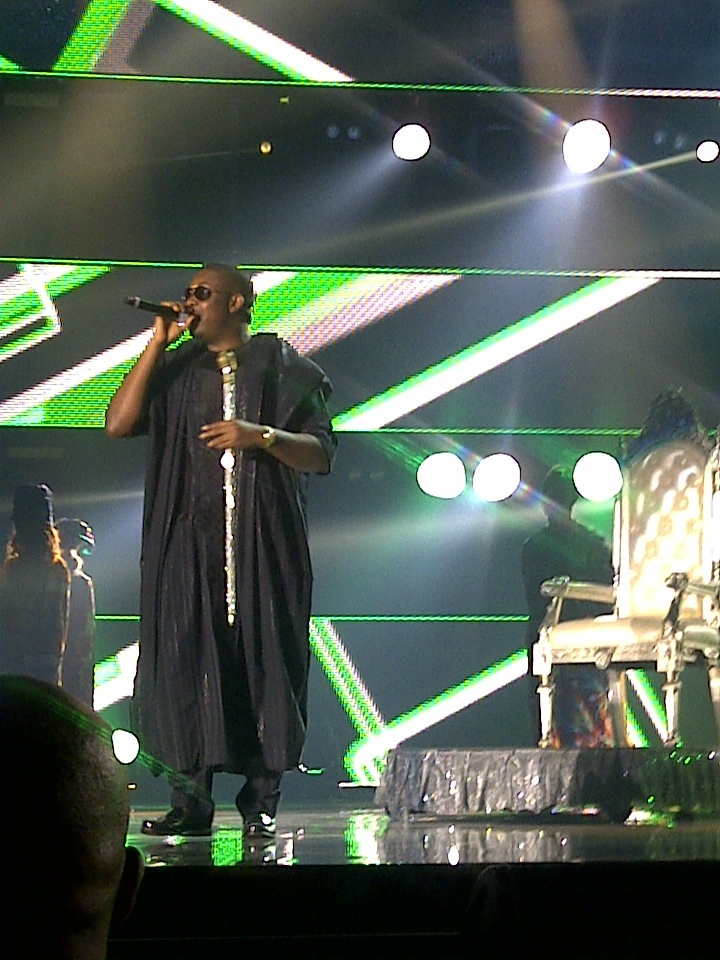
Don Jazzy performing in 2014

=== Mo' Hits records and GOOD music ===
In 2004, Don Jazzy collaborated with D'Banj to form Mo' Hits Records. In the next two years, Don Jazzy produced the albums No Long Thing and Rundown/Funk You Up. Around this time, Don Jazzy developed a recognizable producer/artist tags, "It's Don Jazzy Again!".

In 2008, Don Jazzy was credited in the production of The Entertainer by D'Banj. He also contributed to the production of Wande Coal's Mushin 2 MoHits, an album that was described as one of the best albums to ever come out of Nigeria.

In 2011, Don Jazzy was employed by Kanye West as a producer at Very Good Beatz. Don Jazzy worked with Jay-Z and Kanye West on the production of Lift Off, featuring Beyoncé on the album Watch The Throne which was released on 8 August 2011. In March 2012, Don Jazzy and D'Banj confirmed their breakup citing artistic differences.

=== Mavin records ===
On 7 May 2012, Don Jazzy announced a new record label, Mavin Records. He said, "I see Mavin Records being the power house of music in Africa in the shortest possible time." On 8 May 2012, he released an album featuring the artists signed to his label. The songs on the album included: "Amarachi", "Forever", "Oma Ga", "Take Banana and Chocolate", "YOLO" and the anthem "I'm a MAVIN". Mavin records signed the vocalist, Tiwa Savage. Don Jazzy built a social network platform called "Mavin League" to complement and market his label.

On 5 November 2013, Don Jazzy publicly accused Mavin Records artist Wande Coal of intellectual property theft following the release of the single "Baby Face", which Wande Coal said was produced by Shizzi. The accusation followed reports that Wande Coal had earlier released and promoted the single "Kilaju" without the label's support. Jazzy shared a studio demo of "Baby Face" online, which he said had been recorded the previous year, while Wande Coal denied the claim and shared what he described as the original version of the song. Mavin Records formally announced Wande Coal's departure on 7 November 2013, shortly after the public exchange.

In September 2014, Ajereh produced a Nigerian social activist song with Reekado Banks and Di'Ja called "Arise".

At the Headies Awards 2015, Ajereh argued with Olamide. The two disagreed about who should have won the "Next Rated" award. Lil Kesh of YBNL records lost to Reekado Banks, Ajereh's artist. The winner of the award received a car. Apologies on both sides were posted afterwards.

After Reekado Banks departure from the Mavin Records label, Don Jazzy said he is still part of the family and wished him nothing but success in his career as he thanked him for the time spent with Mavin Records.

In 2019, he signed Rema and later went on in 2020 to sign Ayra Starr into Mavins Record Label. In 2021, he announced a new artist, Magixx.

On 7 April 2021, he revealed why he never signed Davido. He stated that he didn't need to because he "knew he was going to be big."

=== Film appearance ===
In 2012, Don Jazzy appeared in Moses Inwang's movie The Last 3 Digits in Nollywood. Inwang also cast Ali Baba, A.Y., Nonso Diobi and Dr SID. In April 2023, Don Jazzy joined the cast of 'Introducing The Kujus' for its sequel.

=== Jazzy Burger ===
In 2022, Don Jazzy teamed up with Nigerian entrepreneur Richard Chinedu Nnadi to launch Jazzy Burger.

== Awards and recognition ==
- Nigerian Music Awards (2006) – Producer of the Year.
- Nigerian Entertainment Awards (2007) – Music Producer of the Year.
- The Headies 2011 – Producer of the Year for Over The Moon, Mr Endowed and Pop Something
- The Headies 2014 – Producer of the Year for Dorobucci
- City People Entertainment Award (2015) – special recognition award.
- The Beatz Award TM (2019) – New Discovery Producer.

== Production discography ==
=== Albums ===
- D'banj – No Long Thing (2005)
- D'banj – RunDown Funk U Up (2006)
- D'banj – The Entertainer (2008)
- Mo' Hits All Stars – Curriculum Vitae (2007)
1. Anaconda 3:34
2. Booty Call 5:13
3. Close To You 3:43
4. Hey Girl 5:08
5. Igbe Mi 5:40
6. Masquerade 4:02
7. No Long Thing 3:15
8. Ololufe (Club Mix) 4:21
9. Stop The Violence 6:37
10. Why Me (Remix) 5:16
11. Jasi 2:50
- Wande Coal – Mushin2Mohits (2008)
1. I Know U Like It 3:10
2. You Bad 4:05
3. Se Na Like This 4:12
4. Kiss Ur Hands 3:54
5. Confused 4:20
6. Se Ope 3:22
7. Now It's All Gone 4:24
8. Bumper 2 Bumper 3:51
9. Who Born The Maga (featuring Kay Switch) 4:37
10. That's Wots Up 4:42
11. Bananas 3:59
12. Taboo 4:24
13. Jehovah 4:02
14. Ololufe 4:56
15. Ten Ten 3:50
16. My Grind 4:48
17. Been long you saw me
18. Private trips
19. Go low 3:50
20. The kick 4:12
21. Rotate 3:51
- Dr SID Turning Point (2010)
1. When This Song Comes On
2. Over the Moon (feat. K-Switch)
3. Something About You
4. Winchi Winchi (feat. Wande Coal)
5. Pop something (feat. D'Banj)
6. a Mi Jo (feat. Ikechukwu, M.I & eLDee)
7. Baby
8. E Je Ka Jo (feat. D'Banj)
9. Pillow
10. Something About You (Silva Stone Remix)
11. Winchi Winchi (feat. Wande Coal, Sway DaSafo & Dotstar)
- MAVINS – Solar Plexus "MAVIN Records" (2012)
1. Intro by MAVINS (Michael Ajereh, Sidney Esiri)
2. I'm A MAVIN by MAVINS (Michael Ajereh, Tiwatope Savage, Sidney Esiri, Wande Ojosipe, Charles Enebeli)
3. Oma Ga by Tiwa Savage (Michael Ajereh, Tiwatope Savage, Sidney Esiri, Wande Ojosipe)
4. YOLO by Dr SID (Michael Ajereh, Sidney Esiri)
5. See Me Ri by Wande Coal (Michael Ajereh, Sidney Esiri, Wande Ojisipe, Towa Ojosipe)
6. Take Banana by D'PRINCE (Michael Ajereh, Charles Enebeli)
7. CPR by Dr SID (Michael Ajereh, Sidney Esiri)
8. Forever by Wande Coal (Michael Ajereh, Sidney Esiri, Wande Ojosipe, Towa Ojosipe)
9. Why You Over There by D'PRINCE (Michael Ajereh, Charles Enebeli)
10. Chocolate by Dr SID (Michael Ajereh, Sidney Esiri, Charles Enebeli)
11. Pretty Girls by Wande Coal (Michael Ajereh, Wande Ojosipe)
12. Amarachi by D'PRINCE (Michael Ajereh, Charles Enebeli)
13. Outro by MAVINS (Michael Ajereh, Sidney Esiri)

=== Singles with Mo' Hits artists ===
- D'Prince
1. Omoba
2. I like What I See (feat. Wande Coal)
3. Ooze (feat. D'Banj)
4. Give It To me (feat. D'Banj)
- D'banj
1. Tongolo (2005)
2. Soko (2005)
3. Mobolowowon (2005)
4. Why Me (2006)
5. Run Down (2006)
6. Kimon (2008)
7. Olorun Maje (2008)
8. Gbono Feli (2008)
9. Entertainer (2008)
10. Suddenly (2008)
11. Fall in Love (2008)
12. Igwe (2008)
13. Mr Endowed (2010)
14. I do This
15. Scape Goat (2010)
16. ashanti (2010)
17. Mr Endowed (Remix) (feat. Snoop Dogg) (2010)
18. Oliver Twist (2011)
- Wande Coal
1. Bumper 2 Bumper
2. You Bad
3. Kiss Your Hand
4. Who Born the Maga
5. Been Long You Saw Me (feat. Don Jazzy) (2011)
6. Go Low (2011)
- Dr SID
1. Something About You (2009)
2. Winchi winchi (2009)
3. Pop Something(feat. D'Banj)
4. Over The Moon (2010)
5. Chocolate
6. Y.O.L.O
7. C.P.R
8. Afefe
9. Chocolate West African Remix (feat. Ice Prince Sarkodie Elom Adablah Lynxxx)
10. Chocolate East African Remix (feat. Musik Maestro)
11. Lady Don Dada
12. Love Mine
13. Talented
14. Baby Tornado
15. Baby Tornado Remix (feat. Alexandra burke)
16. Surulere (feat. Don Jazzy)
- Mo'Hits Allstars
1. Ten Ten

=== Singles with other artists ===
- Darey – Escalade part 2
- Darey – Stroke Me
- Shank – Never Felt
- Naeto C – Asewo
- Ikechukwu – Like You (feat. Wande Coal)
- Ikechukwu – Wind am well (feat. Don Jazzy and D'Banj)
- Ikechukwu – Do (feat. D'Banj)
- Ikechukwu – All on Me
- Ikechukwu – Critical (feat. D'Banj)
- Ikechukwu – Now is the time (feat. Don Jazzy)
- Sauce Kid – Under G
- Kanye West & Jay-Z – Lift Off (feat. Beyoncé)
- Weird MC – Ijoya
- Burna Boy – Question (2021)
- Jahborne – Wayo

== Personal life ==
Don Jazzy married Michelle Jackson in 2003. He claims they both had issues as a result of his ambitious nature and subsequently divorced about two years after they wed. However, he doesn't plan to marry again soon because he fears his love and dedication to music will hurt someone's feelings again.

In July 2022, he announced that his mother had died to cancer via his Instagram page.

=== Membership of Cherubim and Seraphim Church ===
Don Jazzy has confirmed he is still a committed member of the white garment church called ‘Cherubim and Seraphim’. The music producer was honoured by the Eternal Sacred Order of the Cherubim & Seraphim church worldwide. Before this announcement, it was not widely known that the beat maker was a member of the church.
