= ELDee =

Nigerian-American rapper (born 1977)

eLDee
- Also known as: eLDee The Don
- Born: Lanre Dabiri; May 23, 1977 (age 49); Kaduna, Nigeria
- Origin: Lagos, Nigeria
- Genres: Hip-hop
- Occupations: Rapper; record producer; singer; songwriter
- Years active: 1998–present
- Label: Trybe Records
- Website: tryberecords.com

Lanre Dabiri (born May 23, 1977), known professionally as eLDee, is a Nigerian American rapper, singer, and record producer who resides in the United States. In 1998, he formed the hip-hop group Trybesmen with rappers KB and Freestyle. In October 2016, Nigeria Entertainment Today included him on their list of the 56 Greatest Nigerian Entertainers of All Time. eLDee founded Playdata charts, Nigeria's first official airplay chart. He has released the albums Long Time Coming (2004), Return of the King (2006), Big Boy (2008), Is It Your Money (2010), and Undeniable (2012).

== Early life ==
eLDee was born on May 23, 1977, in Kaduna state, a northern geopolitical zone of Nigeria. He is originally from Lagos Island in Lagos State of Nigeria.

== Education ==
He attended Command Children School kaduna and Essence International School before Moving to Lagos for his higher education. He has a master's degree in Architecture from the University of Lagos, Nigeria in 2001.

== Career ==
eLDee is credited as one of the pioneers of the afrobeats music genre. In 1998, he started a band called Trybesmen which went on to be one of the music groups that popularized the fusion of hip-hop, highlife, pop and traditional afrobeat music. Trybesmen was a continental hit by the year 2000 and played a pivotal role in the shaping of the new music genre.

eLDee signed a total of 16 artists to his Trybe Records label and named the collaboration of all said artists Da Trybe. They produced the singles "Work it out" and "Oya" in 2002, and the album BIG Picture in 2005.

After moving to the United States in 2002, eLDee recorded a solo album titled Long Time Coming (2004). He followed it up with Return of the King (2006), which contains the single "I Go Yarn". Return of the King won "Best International Album" at the 2007 Nigeria Entertainment Awards in New York City. His subsequent albums are Big Boy (2008), originally titled Evolution, Is it your money Vol.1 (2010) and Undeniable (2012).

In 2019, he said he does not regret quitting music as the path his career was going would not make him have time for his family. eLDee has worked as an artist, producer, director, and interactive media consultant.

== Personal life ==
"Lanre" is a derivative of the Yoruba name "Olanrewaju" (which translates to "Wealth is moving forward").

eLDee and his long-term partner, Dolapo Latinwo-Bello are married and together they have 2 daughters, Temi, and Toke. He has been based in Atlanta, USA since 2002.

In December 2013 he posted a message on his official Twitter page to voice his support for gay rights, saying that hopefully one day soon Africa will realize that anti-gay sentiment is no different from racial or religious discrimination.

== Discography ==
Studio albums

- Long Time Coming (2004)
- Return of the King (2006)
- Big Boy (2008)
- Is It Your Money (2010)
- Undeniable (2012)

Compilation albums

- L.A.G Style by Trybesmen (2000)
- The Big Picture (2004)
- The Champion: The Hits (2009)

== See also ==
- List of Nigerian musicians
