= D'banj =

Nigerian singer and TV personality

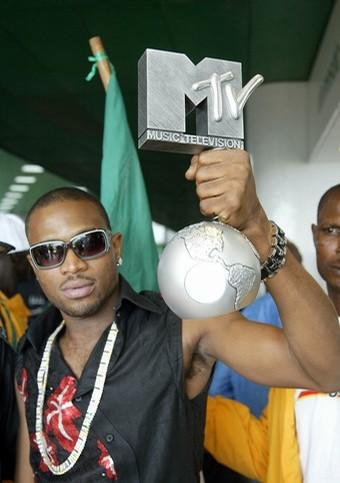
- D'banj at the 2007 MTV Europe Music Awards

Background information
- Born: Oladapo Daniel Oyebanjo; 9 June 1980 (age 46); Zaria, Nigeria
- Genres: Afrobeats; pop; hip hop; R&B
- Occupations: Singer; rapper; television personality
- Years active: 2004–present
- Labels: Capitol; Priority; Mo' Hits; DB; DKM; GOOD; Mercury; Sony; ROCKSTAR4000* RCA
- Website: dbanjrecords.com

Oladapo Daniel Oyebanjo (born 9 June 1980), known professionally as D'banj (/dəˈbændʒ/ də-BANJ), is a Nigerian singer, rapper, music executive, event host and television personality. Often regarded as one of the greatest African and Afrobeats artists of all time, he signed with American rapper Kanye West's record label GOOD Music to release his 2012 single "Oliver Twist", an uptempo dance fusion of EDM and Afrobeats for which he became best known. With record producer Don Jazzy, he co-founded the record label Mo' Hits Records. His stage name is a combination of his first name, Dapo, and his surname, Oyebanjo.

== Early life ==
D'banj, also known as the Kokomaster or Bangalee, was born in Zaria, the northern part of Nigeria to a military officer father and a devoutly religious businesswoman mother from Shagamu in Ogun State. Dbanj has twins as siblings, Taiwo and Kehinde "Kayswitch" Oyebanjo.

D'banj's parents hoped he would follow in his father's footsteps and join the military, but D'banj turned to music instead being introduced to the harmonica by his late older brother, Femi Oyebanjo, who died in a plane crash at the age of seventeen.

D'banj's struggle for his parents' approval inspired his music, most notably on the album track, "All Da Way", from his debut album No Long Thing.

== Work and music ==
=== 2000-2004: JJC and 419 Squad ===
Before his recording debut, D'banj moved from Nigeria to the United Kingdom in 2001 to pursue music after studying mechanical engineering at Lagos State University. Prior to relocating, he recorded early material in Nigeria such as the OJB Jezreel-produced "Kiss Me Again" featuring rapper Ruggedman, which received limited airplay before his departure. After arriving in the UK, D'banj met JJC Skillz around June 2002 and became affiliated with Backbone Music, the label which JJC and 419 Squad operated. D'banj clarified that he was signed to Backbone Music, rather than being a formal member of JJC and the 419 Squad, although he toured extensively with the group due to their active UK performance schedule. During this period, D'banj gained performance experience by appearing at live shows with the 419 Squad across the UK. Don Jazzy was also signed to Backbone Music at the time and worked as a producer, including producing material for JJC and the group. In interviews, JJC has stated that he mentored both D'banj and Don Jazzy, provided accommodation, and facilitated their early exposure through live performances and media appearances. He has also claimed involvement in the development of D'banj's early songs and stage presentation.

=== 2005-2006: Founding of Mo' Hits Records, No Long Thing, and RunDown Funk U Up ===
Don Jazzy founded Mo' Hits Records in September 2004 and signed D'banj as its first artist. D'banj's debut album, No Long Thing, was released by the label on 25 March 2005. D'banj and Don Jazzy completed work on No Long Thing within a short period before returning to Nigeria. It yielded several singles with "Tongolo" as the breakthrough lead single. It also provided his Koko Master persona, with the term, "koko", taking on a variety of meanings. D'banj's debut led to collaborations with other artists, including Dare Art Alade and Ikechukwu on their debut albums.

D'banj's second album Rundown Funk U Up, which was released in 2006, yielded several singles including the club single, "Tongolo (Remix)", and the lead single "Why Me".

=== 2007–2008: Curriculum Vitae and The Entertainer ===
In 2007, D'Banj's single "Tongolo" was used by the Peoples Democratic Party (Nigeria) (PDP) as its campaign theme for the general elections.

D'banj also joined Mo'Hits Records and its collective group, Mo' Hits Allstars (which included artists Dr SID, Wande Coal, KaySwitch, and D'Prince). December 2007 saw the release of the collective's debut album, Curriculum Vitae.. It included singles, "Be Close To You", "Booty Call" and "Move Your Body", which was the lead single. D'banj was featured in Ikechukwu's 2008 hit, "Wind Am Well".

July 2008 saw the release of D'banj's third album, The Entertainer, with the singles "Gbono Feli Feli", "Kimon", "Olorun Maje" and "Entertainer".

=== Mo' Hits/G.O.O.D. Music ===
In June 2011, D'banj was signed to Kanye West G.O.O.D Music record label as an artiste. On 9 June 2011, D'banj wrote on his Twitter account, @iamdbanj, "Just like yesterday, myself and my brother did 'Tongolo'. 7 years later, Mo'Hits signs with GOOD Music. Best Birthday gift ever. God thank you."

In September 2016, it was announced D'banj was released from GOOD Music.

=== Mo'Hits break-up ===
After several months of speculation, producer, Don Jazzy confirmed via his Twitter account the breakup of Mo'Hits. After the break-up, Don Jazzy, D'Prince, Dr SID and Wande Coal started Mavin Records, while D'banj founded DB Records, and he signed his younger brother Kayswitch to the label alongside two producers, Jaysleek and Deevee.

=== Sony Entertainment deal ===
In December 2012, D'banj signed a mega deal with Sony. Speaking on the importance of the deal to Sony, the managing director of Sony Music Entertainment described the deal as a "Pan African multi-album deal with Sony Music's RCA Records. It also involves an exclusive management deal with Sony Music and strategic partner ROCKSTAR4000 for the continent. Add to that a multi-album, worldwide exclusive contract with emerging Nigerian singer-songwriter star Kayswitch, and a strategic partnership with D'Banj's Nigerian record label, DB Records".

=== 2014 ===
The forthcoming single "Bother You", inspired by the film Half of a Yellow Sun, was released on 7 April 2013, by Mi7 Records and D'banj's label, DKM Media. In June 2014, D'banj introduced artists under his record label, which includes him, his younger brother Kay Switch, brothers MossKriss and Ralph Kriss, and Tonto Dikeh and Ebeneztizzy.

=== 2017 ===
He released the album titled King Don Come, with guest features from the likes of Gucci Mane, Wande Coal, Harry Songs, Bucie, Busiswa etc. in August. The album includes singles 'It's Not A Lie', 'El Chapo and his 2012 mega hit 'Oliver Twist'.

=== Live performances ===
In December 2010, the Mo' Hits All Stars brought Koko Concert to Lagos.

On 23 June 2012, D'banj performed at the Hackney Weekend to celebrate the 2012 Summer Olympics, which was headlined by Jay-Z and Rihanna. He performed alongside his friend and fellow Universal Music Group label mate, Rita Ora, on 30 August 2012 at the SCALA London Live Music, Clubs and Arts Venue to celebrate the release of her debut album Ora. He also performed at the AFCON 2013 closing ceremony held in South Africa. On 18 April 2015, D'banj performed at the Global Citizen Earth Day, a free concert on Capitol Hill (Washington Monument Grounds) for the 45th anniversary of Earth Day put on by the Global Poverty Project and the Earth Day Network.

== Awards and accolades ==
D'banj has won several music awards, including the awards for Best African Act at the MTV Europe Music Awards 2007, Artist of the Year at the MTV Africa Music Awards 2009, Best International Act: Africa at the 2011 BET Awards, Best-selling African Artist at the 2014 World Music Awards, Evolution award at the MTV Africa Musical awards 2015.

D'banj's song "Oliver Twist", topped the African charts in 2011 and was a top 10 hit in the UK singles chart in 2012, reaching No. 2 on the UK R&B chart.

== Endorsements ==
With D'banj's first album came his first endorsement from an energy drink called Power Fist. In May 2013, D'banj was named the Bank of Industry (BOI) ambassador. In November 2013, D'banj re-signed a multi-million Naira deal with Globacom, the company he parted ways with in 2010. In June 2014, D'Banj secured a deal with Heritage Bank. In October 2014, D'banj was named the official African ambassador for Beats by Dre. In February 2015, D'banj was named the official African ambassador for Ciroc Nigeria. In an exclusive story on Tush Magazine Issue 11, Banky W and Dbanj shed more light on how they became Ciroc Ambassadors. In September 2015, D'banj was made the brand ambassador of SLOT, a popular mobile phone and electronic gadget retail outfit. Dbanj is now among the richest Afrobeats artists in Nigeria.

== Humanitarian work ==
D'banj is the founder of the Koko Foundation for Youth and Peace Development. He was also Nigeria's first United Nations Youth Ambassador for Peace. Dbanj is a ONE campaign ambassador; he released the song "Cocoa Na Chocolate" in support of agriculture investments. 'Cocoa Na Chocolate' featured 18 other African artists and won Best African Collaboration at the All Africa Music Awards in 2014.

In 2015, he was applauded by World Bank Chief Jim Yong Kim for using his music power and high celebrity status to bring attention to serious and critical issues in Africa, with a special focus on agriculture and poverty alleviation. Jim Yong Kim was quoted as saying, "I had the pleasure of meeting D'banj last month and seeing him perform. I'm thrilled he is the first artists to take part in our new Music4Dev series encouraging global artist to raise awareness about poverty and related issues."

In 2015, D'banj released the video "Extraordinary" to raise awareness on gender equality and women's empowerment. World Bank endorsed the song as a song for women awareness.

In August 2016, D'banj's D'Kings Men Media partnered with MTN Nigeria and the Bank of Industry to launch THE CREAM PLATFORM, a creative talent platform that was set up to help discover young creative minds across Nigeria by just dialing a USSD code on a mobile phone. It is reported that the platform, as of December 2016, had over 2 million paying subscribers and has discovered hundreds of talents from the music category alone, with tens of music videos and millions of Naira DUCTOR SETT given out to winners.

== Personal life ==
D'banj married Lineo Didi Kilgrow in June 2016. He announced the birth of their son, Daniel Oyebanjo III, in May 2017. The child drowned in June 2018.

In June 2020, after D'banj had posted to social media to "say no to rape," Seyitan Babatayo accused him of raping her in 2018, saying she wanted to "[call] him out on his hypocrisy." Shortly thereafter, she went missing for two days, and while she was missing, posts made to her social media said the allegations had been a publicity stunt to support an upcoming D'banj single. According to The Guardian, she was found with help from the NGO Stand to End Rape (STER). She said she'd been abducted by Nigerian police, who turned her over to D'banj's management team, who co-opted her social media and made the retraction posts. D'banj denied the accusations, calling them "false allegations and lies from the pit of hell." After several days, Babatayo issued a statement saying she and D'banj had agreed upon a "non-monetary" settlement, saying, "I just want my peace."

On 3 July 2020, D'banj sued Babatayo for N1.5 billion. Shortly thereafter, D'banj's former manager, Franklin Amudo, reported that Babatayo had told him D'banj had raped her the day after the alleged rape.

== Controversies ==
On 7 December 2022, D'banj was arrested by the Independent Corrupt Practices and Other Related Offences Commission (ICPC) in connection with alleged fraud. The arrest came after D'banj repeatedly ignored invitations from the ICPC to provide an explanation regarding his involvement in the alleged diversion of funds earmarked for the N-Power project.

N-Power is a component of the National Social Investment Program established by the administration of Muhammadu Buhari to address unemployment and enhance social development in Nigeria.

According to reports from Premium Times, D'banj was detained by ICPC operatives on 7 December 2022 after he was compelled to surrender himself at the agency's headquarters in Abuja. It was revealed that D'banj had evaded ICPC summons for several weeks, claiming prior international engagements before his arrest.

The allegations against D'banj suggest that he conspired with certain government officials to include ghost beneficiaries in the N-Power payment scheme, diverting funds intended for genuine beneficiaries into accounts linked to him. Investigations have traced the flow of funds to accounts associated with D'banj.

Following his arrest, D'banj underwent an extensive interrogation and was subsequently detained when his request for administrative bail was turned down by ICPC officials. The Guardian newspaper has reported that the anti-graft agency is considering pressing charges against D'banj for alleged fraud and misappropriation of funds once their investigation is concluded.

After nearly a year of analyzing the financial data and tracking fund trails, the anti-graft agency officially closed the matter by issuing a clearance letter dated November 29, 2023 (Document ICPC/OPS/SDD/SPT. LG/31/23) saying "The commission investigated issues of fraud in the administration of the N-POWER Scheme where Mr Daniel Oladapo Oyebanjo's name came up. However, there was no prima-facie case of fraud against him." The commission definitely added that D'bank was no longer under investigation for any fraud related offenses.

== Discography ==
- No Long Thing (2005)
- RunDown Funk U Up (2006)
- The Entertainer (2008)
- King Don Come (2017)
- The Entertainer: D'Sequel (2024)

== See also ==
- List of Nigerian musicians
- African hip hop
- Nigerian hip hop
- BET Awards of 2011
