= D'banj discography =

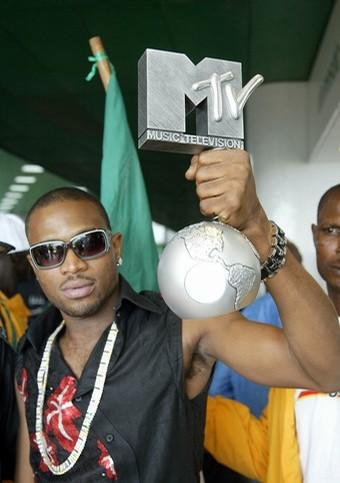
- D'banj at the 2007 MTV Europe Music Awards
- Studio albums: 5
- EPs: 1
- Compilation albums: 1
- Singles: 89
- Promotional singles: 15
- Music videos: 77

The discography of Nigerian singer D'banj consists of five studio albums, one extended play, eighty-nine singles (including thirty as a featured artist), ten promotional singles, and seventy-seven music videos. D'banj began his recording career in the early 2000s and rose to prominence after co-founding Mo' Hits Records with Don Jazzy. His debut album, No Long Thing (2005), spawned the breakthrough single "Tongolo", while its follow-ups, RunDown Funk U Up (2006) and The Entertainer (2008), produced several of his signature songs, including "Why Me", "Fall in Love", and "Mo Gbono Feli Feli". During this period, he was also a member of the Mo' Hits All Stars collective alongside Wande Coal, Dr Sid, D'Prince and Kayswitch.

In 2011, D'banj signed with Kanye West's GOOD Music and achieved international success with "Oliver Twist", which became one of the first Afrobeats songs to chart prominently in the United Kingdom and earned a platinum certification from the British Phonographic Industry. Following the dissolution of Mo' Hits Records, he founded DB Records and released projects including the compilation album D'Kings Men (2013), the extended play An Epic Journey (2015), and his fourth studio album King Don Come (2017). His fifth studio album, The Entertainer: D'Sequel, was released in 2024, sixteen years after The Entertainer.

== Studio albums ==
Title	Album details
No Long Thing	Released: 25 March 2005; Label: Mo' Hits; Format: CD, digital download
RunDown Funk U Up	Released: 10 August 2006; Label: Mo' Hits; Format: CD, digital download
The Entertainer	Released: 26 July 2008; Label: Mo' Hits; Format: CD, digital download
King Don Come	Released: 25 August 2017; Label: DB Records; Format: CD, streaming, digital download
The Entertainer: D'Sequel	Released: 16 August 2024; Label: DB Records; Format: Streaming, digital download

== Extended plays ==
Title	Album details
An Epic Journey	Released: 25 September 2015; Label: DB Records; Format: CD, digital download

== Compilation albums ==
Title	Album details
D'Kings Men	Released: 24 June 2013; Label: DB Records; Format: CD, digital download

== Singles ==
=== As lead artist ===
List of singles as lead artist, with selected chart positions
Title	Year	Peak chart positions										Certifications	Album
Title	Year	BEL (FL)	BEL (WA)	GER	IRE	ROM	SCO	SLO	UK	UK Indie	UK R&B/HH	Certifications	Album
"Kiss Me Again" (featuring Ruggedman)	2002	—	—	—	—	—	—	—	—	—	—		Non-album singles
"Gba Si Be" (featuring Abounce)	2002	—	—	—	—	—	—	—	—	—	—		Non-album singles
"One More Time"	2002	—	—	—	—	—	—	—	—	—	—		Non-album singles
"Tongolo"	2004	—	—	—	—	—	—	—	—	—	—		No Long Thing
"Socor"	2005	—	—	—	—	—	—	—	—	—	—		No Long Thing
"Mobolowowon"	2005	—	—	—	—	—	—	—	—	—	—		No Long Thing
"Why Me"	2006	—	—	—	—	—	—	—	—	—	—		RunDown Funk U Up
"Do You Like D Koko"	2006	—	—	—	—	—	—	—	—	—	—		RunDown Funk U Up
"Move Your Body" (with Wande Coal)	2007	—	—	—	—	—	—	—	—	—	—		Curriculum Vitae
"Mo Gbono Feli Feli"	2008	—	—	—	—	—	—	—	—	—	—		The Entertainer
"Igwe" (featuring Don Jazzy)	2008	—	—	—	—	—	—	—	—	—	—		The Entertainer
"Fall in Love"	2008	—	—	—	—	—	—	—	—	—	—		The Entertainer
"Mr Endowed"	2010	—	—	—	—	—	—	—	—	—	—		Non-album singles
"Scape Goat"	2010	—	—	—	—	—	—	—	—	—	—		Non-album singles
"Mr Endowed" (Remix) (featuring Snoop Dogg)	2011	—	—	—	—	—	—	—	—	—	—		Non-album singles
"Oliver Twist"	2011	10	18	66	55	1	12	24	9	—	2	BPI: Platinum	D'Kings Men and King Don Come
"Oyato"	2012	—	—	—	—	—	—	—	—	—	—		Non-album single
"Bachelor"	2012	—	—	—	—	—	—	—	—	—	—		D'Kings Men
"Top of the World"	2012	—	—	—	—	—	—	—	—	—	—		D'Kings Men
"Cashflow" (featuring Kayswitch)	2012	—	—	—	—	—	—	—	—	—	—		D'Kings Men
"Don't Tell Me Nonsense"	2013	—	—	—	—	—	—	—	—	—	—		D'Kings Men
"Why You Love Me"	2013	—	—	—	—	—	—	—	—	—	—		D'Kings Men
"Finally"	2013	—	—	—	—	—	—	—	—	—	—		D'Kings Men
"Bother You"	2014	—	—	—	—	—	—	—	—	28	—		Non-album singles
"Alaye"	2014	—	—	—	—	—	—	—	—	—	—		Non-album singles
"Omini"	2014	—	—	—	—	—	—	—	—	—	—		Non-album singles
"Feeling the Nigga"	2014	—	—	—	—	—	—	—	—	—	—		Non-album singles
"Feeling the Nigga" (Remix) (featuring Akon)	2015	—	—	—	—	—	—	—	—	—	—		An Epic Journey
"Extraordinary"	2015	—	—	—	—	—	—	—	—	—	—		An Epic Journey
"Knocking on My Door"	2015	—	—	—	—	—	—	—	—	—	—		An Epic Journey
"Salute" (featuring Ice Prince)	2015	—	—	—	—	—	—	—	—	—	—		An Epic Journey
"Confidential" (featuring Idris Elba and Shadow Boxxer)	2015	—	—	—	—	—	—	—	—	—	—		An Epic Journey
"Frosh" (featuring Akon)	2015	—	—	—	—	—	—	—	—	—	—		An Epic Journey
"Emergency"	2016	—	—	—	—	—	—	—	—	—	—		King Don Come
"Breaking News"	2016	—	—	—	—	—	—	—	—	—	—		Non-album singles
"If No Be God (Superstar)"	2016	—	—	—	—	—	—	—	—	—	—		Non-album singles
"Focus"	2016	—	—	—	—	—	—	—	—	—	—		Non-album singles
"It's Not a Lie" (featuring Harrysong and Wande Coal)	2017	—	—	—	—	—	—	—	—	—	—		King Don Come
"Be With You"	2017	—	—	—	—	—	—	—	—	—	—		King Don Come
"Comment Ça Va" (with The Fedz)	2017	—	—	—	—	—	—	—	—	—	—		Non-album single
"El Chapo" (featuring Gucci Mane and Wande Coal)	2017	—	—	—	—	—	—	—	—	—	—		King Don Come
"As I Dey Go"	2017	—	—	—	—	—	—	—	—	—	—		King Don Come
"Issa Banger" (featuring Slimcase and Mr Real)	2018	—	—	—	—	—	—	—	—	—	—		Non-album singles
"Action"	2018	—	—	—	—	—	—	—	—	—	—		Non-album singles
"Agidi"	2018	—	—	—	—	—	—	—	—	—	—		Non-album singles
"Shake It" (featuring Tiwa Savage)	2018	—	—	—	—	—	—	—	—	—	—		Non-album singles
"Something for Something" (featuring Cassper Nyovest)	2018	—	—	—	—	—	—	—	—	—	—		Non-album singles
"Baecation" (with 2Baba)	2019	—	—	—	—	—	—	—	—	—	—		Non-album singles
"Shy"	2019	—	—	—	—	—	—	—	—	—	—		Non-album singles
"Mo Cover Eh" (featuring Slimcase)	2019	—	—	—	—	—	—	—	—	—	—		Non-album singles
"Everything Is Ok"	2019	—	—	—	—	—	—	—	—	—	—		Non-album singles
"Ikebe"	2021	—	—	—	—	—	—	—	—	—	—		Non-album singles
"Banga"	2021	—	—	—	—	—	—	—	—	—	—		Stress Free, Volume 1
"Stress Free" (featuring Seun Kuti and Egypt 80)	2021	—	—	—	—	—	—	—	—	—	—		Stress Free, Volume 1
"Face Show" (featuring Skiibii and Hollyhood Bay Bay)	2022	—	—	—	—	—	—	—	—	—	—		Non-album singles
"Cover Me"	2022	—	—	—	—	—	—	—	—	—	—		Non-album singles
"Chop Life" (featuring Timaya)	2023	—	—	—	—	—	—	—	—	—	—		Non-album singles
"Gbe Gbe" (with Skiibii)	2023	—	—	—	—	—	—	—	—	—	—		Non-album singles
"Taya" (with Timaya and Zlatan featuring Kayswitch, Specikinging and Bhadboi OML)	2024	—	—	—	—	—	—	—	—	—	—		The Entertainer: D'Sequel
"Since '04"	2024	—	—	—	—	—	—	—	—	—	—		The Entertainer: D'Sequel
"Koko"	2024	—	—	—	—	—	—	—	—	—	—		The Entertainer: D'Sequel
"Worthy" (featuring Youssou N'Dour and Chechi Sarai)	2024	—	—	—	—	—	—	—	—	—	—		The Entertainer: D'Sequel
"Tobari" (featuring DJ Maphorisa and DJ Obi)	2025	—	—	—	—	—	—	—	—	—	—		Non-album single
"—" denotes a recording that did not chart or was not released in that territory.

=== As featured artist ===
List of singles as featured artist
Title	Year	Album
"Jekalo" (JJC & 419 Squad featuring Kween and D'banj)	2003	Atide
"Walahi Talai" (JJC & 419 Squad featuring Kween and D'banj)	2003	Atide
"See Me See Wahala" (JJC & 419 Squad featuring Stylo G and D'banj)	2003	Atide
"Be Close to You" (Mo' Hits All Stars featuring D'banj, Wande Coal, Dr Sid, and D'Prince)	2007	Curriculum Vitae
"Pere" (Mo' Hits All Stars featuring D'banj, Wande Coal, and Don Jazzy)	2007	Curriculum Vitae
"Booty Call" (Mo' Hits All Stars featuring D'banj, Wande Coal, Dr Sid, D'Prince, and Kayswitch)	2007	Curriculum Vitae
"Wind Am Well" (Ikechukwu featuring D'banj and Don Jazzy)	2008	Life & Times of Killz Vol. 1
"Pop Something" (Dr Sid featuring D'banj)	2009	Turning Point
"Ooze" (D'Prince featuring Wande Coal and D'banj)	2009	Non-album single
"Critical" (Ikechukwu featuring D'banj)	2009	The Alliance Reconstructed
"Fimile" (Remix) (Kas featuring 2Face Idibia and D'banj)	2010	a.k.a. Fi Mi Le
"Sister Caro" (Kayswitch featuring D'banj)	2012	D'Kings Men
"Tony Montana" (Remix) (Naeto C featuring D'banj)	2012	Non-album single
"Kukere" (Remix) (Iyanya featuring D'banj)	2012	Desire
"Mind Over Matter" (Timaya featuring D'banj)	2013	Non-album single
"Obimo" (Kayswitch featuring D'banj)	2013	D'Kings Men
"Won Da Mo" (Burna Boy featuring D'banj)	2013	Non-album single
"Double Wahala" (Remix) (Oritse Femi featuring D'banj)	2014	Money Stops Nonsense
"Sugar Rush" (Tonto Dikeh featuring D'banj)	2014	Non-album singles
"Zim Zimma" (The Lee Temple featuring D'banj, Kayswitch, Tonto Dikeh, and 2Kriss)	2015	Non-album singles
"Wololo" (Remix) (Babes Wodumo featuring D'banj and Mampintsha)	2016	Non-album singles
"Shikishiki Mami" (Rayce featuring D'banj)	2017	African Juice
"Senrere" (Skales featuring D'banj)	2018	Non-album singles
"Lemonade" (Cheekychizzy featuring D'banj)	2018	Non-album singles
"Baba Nla" (Larry Gaaga featuring 2Baba, D'banj, and Burna Boy)	2018	Non-album singles
"Ojoro" (DJ Neptune featuring D'banj and Flash)	2019	Non-album singles
"Chow Chow" (DJ Obi featuring D'banj and Kayswitch)	2021	Non-album singles
"Igbalode" (CDQ featuring D'banj and Timaya)	2023	Mood and Ecstasy
"Million" (Roki featuring D'banj, Vito, and Awilo Longomba)	2023	Non-album singles
"It's Going" (Tokhyn featuring D'banj)	2025	Non-album singles

== Promotional singles ==
=== As lead artist ===
List of promotional singles as lead artist
Title	Year	Album
"I Do This"	2010	Non-album singles
"Come to Me" (with Sarkodie)	2012	Non-album singles
"Let's Get This Party Started" (with 2Face Idibia, Wizkid, M.I, and Tiwa Savage)	2012	Non-album singles
"Nous Les Muilleurs (We the Best)" (featuring Fally Ipupa)	2013	D'Kings Men
"Ibadi E (Bounce)" (featuring Olamide, Durella, Kayswitch, and J.Sol)	2013	D'Kings Men
"Scape Goat (The Fix)" (featuring Kanye West)	2013	D'Kings Men
"Blame It on the Money" (featuring Big Sean and Snoop Lion)	2013	D'Kings Men
"Raise Your Glasses"	2013	Hennessy Artistry
"Oya Wait" (featuring Burna Boy)	2014	Non-album singles
"Cocoa Na Chocolate" (with Africa All Stars)	2014	Non-album singles

=== As featured artist ===
List of promotional singles as featured artist
Title	Year	Album
"Lagos Party" (Remix) (Banky W. featuring Naeto C, eLDee, 9ice, Muna, and D'banj)	2009	The W Experience
"Give it to Me" (D'Prince featuring D'banj)	2010	Non-album singles
"Rep 4 Naija" (MTV Base Africa featuring eLDee, Naeto C, Blak Twang, D'banj, Sound Sultan, Meaku, and M.I)	2011	Non-album singles
"First of All" (Remix) (Olamide featuring D'banj)	2013	D'Kings Men
"Everybody Loves Christmas" (Funke Akindele featuring Falz, D'banj, Waje, and cast of Everybody Loves Jenifa)	2024	Non-album single

== Guest appearances ==
List of non-single guest appearances, with other performing artists, showing year released and album name
Title	Year	Other artist(s)	Album
"Jekalo" (Remix)	2005	JJC & 419 Squad, Kween, Dr Sid	Atide
"Escalade" (Part 2)	2006	Dare Art Alade, Alaye, Ikechukwu	From Me 2 U
"Do"	2006	Ikechukwu	Son of the Soil
"What You Want Do to Me"	2007	Wande Coal, Dr Sid, D'Prince	Curriculum Vitae
"Why Me" (Remix)	2007	Wande Coal, Don Jazzy	Curriculum Vitae
"Igbe Mi (My S***t)"	2007	D'Prince	Curriculum Vitae
"Masquerade"	2007	Wande Coal, Don Jazzy	Curriculum Vitae
"Jasi"	2007	Wande Coal, Don Jazzy	Curriculum Vitae
"No Long Thing"	2007	Dr Sid	Curriculum Vitae
"Oh No"	2007	Wande Coal, Dr Sid, Kayswitch, D'Prince	Curriculum Vitae
"Anaconda"	2007	Wande Coal	Curriculum Vitae
"Stop the Violence"	2007	Wande Coal, Dr Sid, D'Prince	Curriculum Vitae
"Never Felt"	2009	Shank	King Kong
"Confused"	2009	Wande Coal	Mushin 2 Mo' Hits
"You Bad"	2009	Wande Coal	Mushin 2 Mo' Hits
"The Morning"	2012	Raekwon, Pusha T, Common, 2 Chainz, Cyhi the Prynce, Kid Cudi	Cruel Summer
"Gifted"	2014	DJ Jimmy Jatt	The Industry, Vol. 1
"Tina"	2015	Seyi Shay	Seyi or Shay
"I Pray"	2016	Vector	Lafíaji
"Oshepete"	2018	Mayorkun	The Mayor of Lagos
"Fin de Semana"	2019	Claudia Leitte, Messiah	Bandera Move
"Oroma"	2022	Waje	The Misfit
"Mina Nginje"	2023	DJ Tira, Nkosazana Daughter, Master KG	Malume Way
"Wait"	2025	Spyro	The Men, The Boys and Your Guy

== Music videos ==
=== As lead artist ===
List of music videos as lead artist, showing date released and directors
Title	Year	Director(s)
"Tongolo"	2005	DJ Tee
"Socor"	2005	DJ Tee
"Mobolowowon"	2005	DJ Tee
"Why Me"	2006	DJ Tee
"Move Your Body" (with Wande Coal)	2007	—
"Suddenly"	2009	Sesan
"Mo Gbono Feli Feli"	2009	Sesan
"Kimon"	2009	Sesan
"Fall in Love"	2010	Sesan
"Mr Endowed"	2010	Sesan
"Mr Endowed" (Remix) (featuring Snoop Dogg)	2011	Sesan
"Oliver Twist"	2012	Sesan
"Let's Get This Party Started" (with 2Face Idibia, Wizkid, M.I and Tiwa Savage)	2012	Clarence Peters
"Bachelor"	2012	Sesan and D'banj
"Cashflow" (featuring Kayswitch)	2012	Sesan
"Don't Tell Me Nonsense"	2013	Mattmax
"Top of the World"	2013	Godfather Productions
"Finally"	2013	Sesan
"Raise Your Glasses"	2013	Mattmax
"Why You Love Me"	2013	Godfather Productions
"Bother You"	2014	Godfather Productions
"Cocoa Na Chocolate" (with Africa All Stars)	2014	Godfather Productions
"Feeling the Nigga"	2014	Mazi C.I. Jizzle
"Feeling the Nigga" (Remix) (featuring Akon)	2015	D'baines
"Extraordinary"	2015	—
"Knocking on My Door"	2015	Moe Musa and D'banj
"Salute" (featuring Ice Prince)	2015	Moe Musa
"Confidential" (featuring Idris Elba and Shadow Boxxer)	2015	Thomas Ikimi
"Frosh" (featuring Akon)	2015	Christian Bowen
"Emergency"	2016	Unlimited L.A
"If No Be God (Superstar)"	2016	Mattmax
"It's Not a Lie" (featuring Wande Coal and Harrysong)	2017	Patrick Elis
"Be With You"	2017	Eif Rivera
"El Chapo" (featuring Gucci Mane and Wande Coal)	2017	Eif Rivera
"As I Dey Go"	2017	Mattmax
"Issa Banger" (featuring Slimcase and Mr Real)	2018	Director Q
"Shoulda"	2018	Unlimited L.A
"Shake It" (featuring Tiwa Savage)	2018	Sesan
"Something for Something" (featuring Cassper Nyovest)	2018	Nate Thomas
"Baecation" (with 2Baba)	2019	Sesan
"Shy"	2019	TG Omori
"Mo Cover Eh" (featuring Slimcase)	2019	Unlimited L.A
"Everything Is Ok"	2019	HG2 Filmworks
"Banga"	2021	Clarence Peters
"Stress Free" (featuring Seun Kuti and Egypt 80)	2021	Clarence Peters
"Chop Life" (featuring Timaya)	2023	Olu The Wave
"Since '04"	2024	Director Pink
"Worthy" (featuring Youssou N'Dour and Chechi Sarai)	2024	Clarence Peters
"Koko"	2024	Director Pink
"Kala" (featuring Awilo Longomba)	2024	Sesan

=== As featured artist ===
List of music videos as featured artist, showing date released and directors
Title	Year	Director(s)
"Jekalo" (JJC & 419 Squad featuring Kween and D'banj)	2004	Ayo Shonaiya
"Walahi Talahi" (JJC & 419 Squad featuring Kween and D'banj)	2004	Ayo Shonaiya
"Booty Call" (Mo' Hits All Stars featuring D'banj, Wande Coal, Dr Sid, D'Prince, and Kayswitch)	2008	—
"Wind Am Well" (Ikechukwu featuring Don Jazzy and D'banj)	2008	Seyi Babatope
"Be Close to You" (Mo' Hits All Stars featuring D'banj, Wande Coal, Dr Sid, and D'Prince)	2008	—
"Pere" (Mo' Hits All Stars featuring D'banj, Wande Coal, and Don Jazzy)	2008	DJ Tee
"You Bad" (Wande Coal featuring D'banj)	2009	Sesan
"Pop Something" (Dr Sid featuring D'banj)	2010	Walt Banger
"Critical" (Ikechukwu featuring D'banj)	2010	Oluwaseye Olusa
"Give it to Me" (D'Prince featuring D'banj)	2010	Sesan
"Rep 4 Naija" (MTV Base Africa featuring eLDee, Naeto C, Blak Twang, D'banj, Sound Sultan, Meaku, and M.I)	2011	Clarence Peters
"Tony Montana" (Remix) (Naeto C featuring D'banj)	2012	Fiendish Productions
"Sister Caro" (Kayswitch featuring D'banj)	2013	—
"Obimo" (Kayswitch featuring D'banj)	2013	Patrick Elis
"Emmah" (KCee featuring D'banj)	2014	Godfather Productions
"Won Da Mo" (Burna Boy featuring D'banj)	2014	Godfather Productions
"Double Wahala" (Remix) (Oritse Femi featuring D'banj)	2014	Moe Musa
"Sugar Rush" (Tonto Dikeh featuring D'banj)	2015	Moe Musa
"Shikishiki Mami" (Rayce featuring D'banj)	2017	Avalon Okpe
"Senrere" (Skales featuring D'banj)	2018	Lucas Reid
"Baba Nla" (Larry Gaaga featuring 2Baba, D'banj, and Burna Boy)	2018	Clarence Peters
"Lemonade" (Cheekychizzy featuring D'banj)	2018	Patrick Elis
"Ojoro" (DJ Neptune featuring D'banj and Flash)	2019	C.S. Ifeme
"Dangote" (Dimplez featuring D'banj)	2019	Unlimited L.A
"Big Vibe" (Cheekychizzy featuring D'banj)	2020	TG Omori
"Igbalode" (CDQ featuring D'banj and Timaya)	2023	Kemzart
"Everybody Loves Christmas" (Funke Akindele featuring Falz, D'banj, Waje, and cast of Everybody Loves Jenifa)	2025	Director Pink
