= Kesse =

Kesse may refer to:

== People ==
- Kesse (musician) (born 1986), Ghanaian musician
- Jennifer Kesse (born 1981), American woman who disappeared in 2006
- Yona Kesse (1907–1985), Israeli politician

== Other uses ==
- Kesse, a common name of the herb Lippia abyssinica
- Kesse, Estonia, a village
