= TheCityCeleb =

Nigerian media company

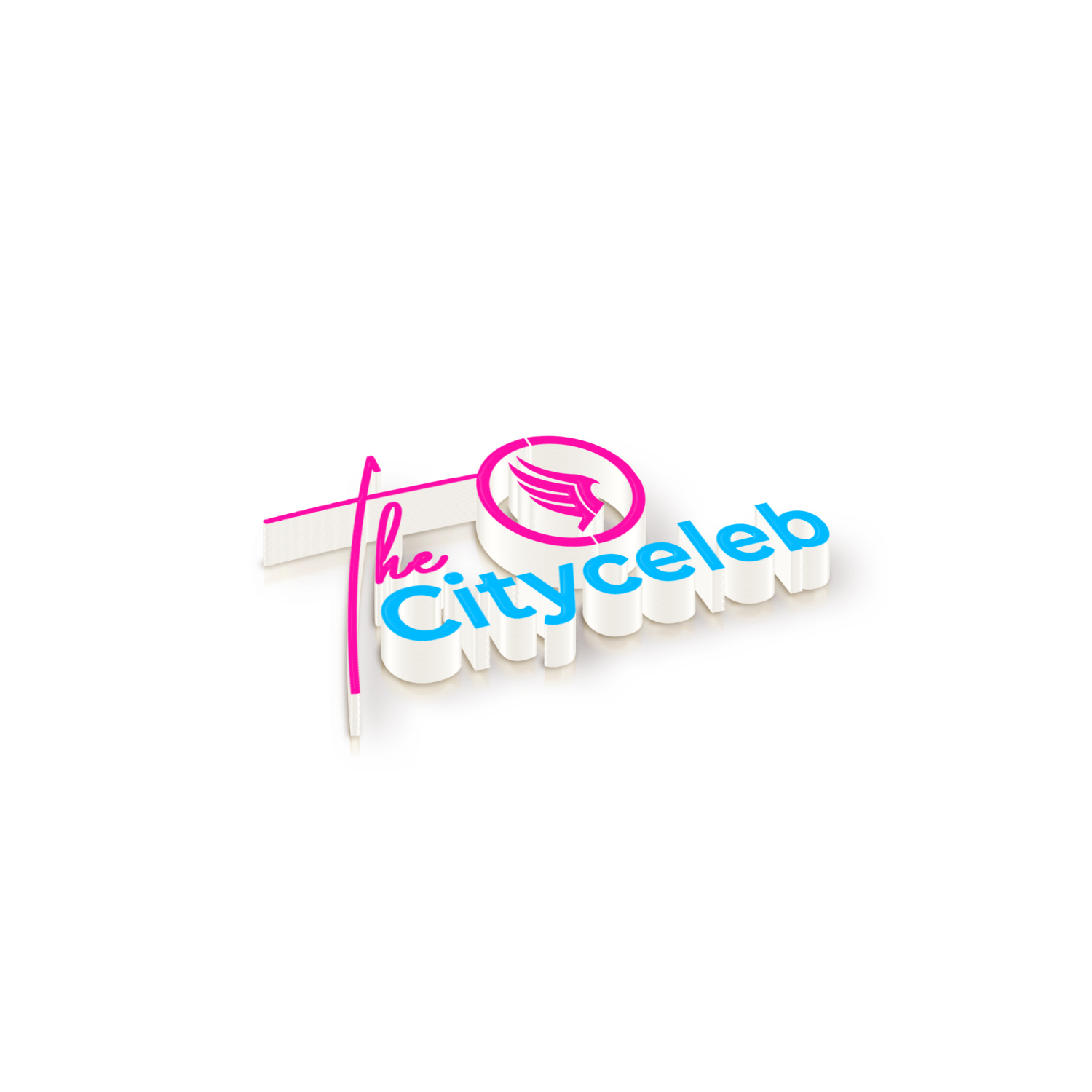
- Website type: Media & Entertainment
- Available in: English
- Founded: February 2020
- Headquarters: Lagos, {{{location_country}}}
- Founder: Lawrence Godwin (Kaptain Kush)
- Website: http://www.thecityceleb.com/
- Advertising: Yes
- Registration: Optional
- Launched: 5 February 2020
- Current status: Active
- Written in: PHP, HTML, JavaScript, CSS

TheCityCeleb is a Nigerian media and entertainment company, focuses primarily on celebrity biographies and entertainment news, headquartered in Lagos, Nigeria.

== History ==
TheCityCeleb was founded by Lawrence 'Kaptain Kush' Godwin in 2020. In its early form, TheCityCeleb emerged as a digital platform focused on documenting biographies of Nigerian and international celebrities.

== Achievements ==
In 2023, TheCityCeleb was ranked fourth in top 10 Africa’s leading media brands by Guardian.

TheCityCeleb was honoured at the 2025 African Media Summit in Accra, Ghana.

== Awards ==
Year	Award	Prize	Result	Ref
2022	City People Entertainment Awards	Recognition Award	Won	
