= Olufela =

- Gender: Male
- Language: Yoruba

Origin
- Origin: Nigeria
- Meaning: Master of Prosperity or Lord of wealth
- Region of origin: South-west

Other names
- Short forms: Olu, Fela

Olufela audio is a masculine Yoruba given name, predominantly found in Nigeria. It combines two words: "Olu" meaning "lord" or "master" and "Fela" meaning "wealth" or "prosperity." Therefore, Olufela translates to "Lord of Wealth" or "Master of Prosperity." This name symbolizes abundance, success, and leadership, and is often given to children born into families of prominence or those destined for greatness. Olufela is a powerful and auspicious name, reflecting Yoruba values of prosperity, dignity, and noble lineage. Diminutive versions of the name include "Olu" and "Fela".

== Notable people with the name ==
- Olufela Olomola, English footballer
- Olufela Olusegun Oludotun Ransome-Kuti, Nigerian musician and activist
- Olufela Olufemi Anikulapo Kuti, Nigerian musician and songwriter
- Funmilayo Ransome-Kuti, Nigerian activist
- Olufela Omokeko, Nigerian multimedia artist
- Charles Emanuel Olufela Obafunmilayo Sowande, Nigerian musician and composer
