= Okposo =

Okposo is a surname of Nigerian origin. Notable people with the surname include:

- Kyle Okposo (born 1988), American ice hockey player
- Sammie Okposo (1971–2022), Nigerian Gospel artist
