= King Don Come =

Studio album by D'banj
- Released: 25 August 2017
- Recorded: 2011–2017
- Genre: Afropop
- Length: 46:36
- Label: DB; DKM
- Producer: Killertunes; Don Jazzy; Shizzi; Cheekychizzy; Ploops; Maleek Berry; Dr. Amir

D'banj chronology
| An Epic Journey (2015) | King Don Come (2017) | Stress Free, Chapter 1 (2021) |

Singles from King Don Come
- 1. "Oliver Twist" Released: 13 August 2011; 2. "Emergency" Released: 8 January 2016; 3. "It's Not a Lie" Released: 11 June 2017; 4. "Be With You" Released: 28 July 2017; 5. "El Chapo" Released: 25 August 2017; 6. "As I Dey Go" Released: 6 December 2017

King Don Come is the fourth studio album by Nigerian recording artist D'banj. It was released on 25 August 2017 by DB Records and DKM Media and features guest appearances from Wande Coal, Gucci Mane, Harrysong, Phyno, Busiswa, Bucie and Kayswitch. The album was mainly produced by Cheekychizzy, along with additional production from Killertunes, Don Jazzy, Shizzi, Dr. Amir, Maleek Berry and Ploops. The album houses the singles, "Oliver Twist", "Emergency", "It's Not a Lie", "Be With You", and "El Chapo". A day after the album's release, King Don Come debuted at number one on the Nigeria iTunes Top Albums Chart.

== Background and singles ==
In 2017, rumors circulated that D'banj was planning a new album. He later confirmed the reports, announcing that the project would be titled King Don Come and released later that year. On 27 June 2017, he shared the DUKS Arts-designed artwork for King Don Come, which depicts D'banj as a medieval king on a throne amid a battle, wearing royal robes and his DB chain, with dragons and other creatures surrounding him. The artwork came with a date tag of 7-7-17. The date was widely interpreted as the album's release date, but the project was not released. D'banj's business manager, Franklin Amudo, clarified that the date marked the one-year anniversary of the C.R.E.A.M platform and was not the album's release date. A release date for the album was later announced for 25 August 2017.

The album's lead single "Oliver Twist" was first released on 12 August 2011 under Mo' Hits Records, then eventually released by Mercury Records in the United Kingdom on 11 May 2012. Produced by Don Jazzy, the song was included on the DB Records compilation album D'Kings Men (2013). The single peaked at number nine on the UK Singles Chart and spent fourteen weeks on the chart. The music video for "Oliver Twist" was released on 18 March 2012 and was directed by Sesan. The video features cameos from Kanye West, will.i.am, Big Sean, Mannie Fresh, and Pusha T, among others. "Oliver Twist" won Song of the Year and received a nomination for Best Pop Single at The Headies 2013. Umar Hassan of YNaija criticized "Oliver Twist"'s inclusion on King Don Come, citing that the track was over five years old by the time it appeared on the album. Toye Sokunbi, a writer for The Native, inferred that the song's inclusion on the album may have been due to benefit from the RIAA's stream-to-album conversion system, as the song’s global streaming numbers would count toward the album’s total sales.

"Emergency" was released on 8 January 2016 as the album's second single, first performing the track at the 2015 edition of the Glo CAF Awards. The beat, produced by Ploops, was originally intended for Olu Maintain but was later used by D'banj, who recorded the song during his Koko Tour in Owerri. The music video for "Emergency" was released on 16 February 2016 and directed by Unlimited L.A and D'Banj. Oris Aigbokhaevbolo of Music in Africa said that with the single, D'banj "may have found a way to remove himself from pop music's purgatory", noting the song blended early D'banj elements with Fela-inspired sounds and modern production. "Emergency" received nominations for Best Pop Single, Best Recording of the Year, and Best Music Video at The Headies 2016, alongside Song of the Year and Video of the Year at the 2016 Soundcity MVP Awards. At The Beatz Awards 2016, Ploops was nominated for New Discovery Producer and Best Afrobeat Producer for "Emergency", and the mixing/mastering engineer, WizzyPro, was nominated for Best Mixing & Mastering Engineer. In September 2025, Arinzezim, a TikToker, was given ₦1 million by D'banj for posting a video dancing to the song.

The highlife-infused third single "It's Not a Lie" features Harrysong and Wande Coal and was produced by Cheekychizzy and Dr. Amir. Released on 11 June 2017, the music video was shot and directed by Patrick Elis in Los Angeles. The song received positive reviews from critics, who commended Harrysong's contributions on the track and criticized D'banj's. Sabo Kpade of OkayAfrica called the single "highlife goodness", noting that it's reminiscent of old Mo' Hits songs and including it in his list of the 10 Best Nigerian Songs of the Month in June. The Native described the song as a "declaration of D'Banj's enduring star power." A writer for The Nation rated "It's Not a Lie" a 6/10, saying D'banj's verse "almost cost the Afrocentric percussion of this song and the lovely hook of Harry Songs," and suggested the track would have been stronger if he had limited his role to the chorus. Oluwatosin Adeshokan of YNaija said "It's Not a Lie" was "really good, but it seemed set in a parallel universe," noting that D'banj's presence was weak and the song felt more like a Harrysong track.

The fourth single "Be With You" was released on 28 July 2017, alongside its accompanying music video. The Gucci Mane and Wande Coal-assisted fifth single "El Chapo", was released on 25 August 2017. The mid-tempo trap-influenced song was produced by Maleek Berry, and the music video was directed by Eif Rivera. A writer for YNaija who goes by the pseudonym "The Music Blog" said that "D'banj builds casing melodies that almost takes the presence of Gucci Mane and Wande Coal out of mind". All reviewing for tooXclusive, Al Yhusuff called it "awesome," Magnificent Godwin said D'banj "gave me a striking shock with his vibe," Daniel Enisan said his delivery was "flawless," Oluwatobi Ibironke called the Gucci Mane feature "brilliant," and Jim Donnett said the track was "pure litness" with D'banj sounding original. D'banj released the music video for the album's sixth single, "As I Dey Go", on 6 December 2017. The video was directed by Mattmax. On 16 February 2018, the Unlimited L.A-directed video for "Shoulda" was released. The song features D'banj playing the harmonica.

== Critical reception ==
Professional ratings
Review scores
| Source | Rating |
|---|---|
| Filterfree | 59% |
| Pulse Nigeria | 3.5/5 stars |

King Don Come received mixed reviews from critics. Joey Akan of Pulse Nigeria rated it a 3.5 out of 5, concluding that "it's reassuring evidence that D’banj can still make pan-African pop records." Reviewing for Filterfree, Chiagoziem Onyekwena commended D'banj and Cheekychizzy's chemistry on the album, rating it a 59% and concluded that "D'Banj isn’t waiting for anyone to blow his trumpet, he's decided to blow his own harmonica by himself."

Umar Hassan of YNaija praised the songs "El Chapo", "Ntswempu", and "Shoulda", and criticized the tracks "Be With You" and "Egweji". Debola Abimbolu of The Native said that King Don Come was "not only satisfying but also convincingly cohesive."

== Track listing ==
King Don Come track listing
| No. | Title | Writer(s) | Producer(s) | Length |
|---|---|---|---|---|
| 1. | "It's Not a Lie" (featuring Harrysong and Wande Coal) | Oladapo Oyebanjo; Harrison Okiri; Oluwatobi Ojosipe | Cheekychizzy; Dr Amir | 3:12 |
| 2. | "Be With You" | Oyebanjo | Ploops; Cheekychizzy; Shizzi | 3:34 |
| 3. | "Te Necesito" | Oyebanjo | Ploops; Cheekychizzy | 3:24 |
| 4. | "El Chapo" (featuring Gucci Mane and Wande Coal) | Oyebanjo; Radric Davis; Ojosipe | Maleek Berry | 4:46 |
| 5. | "As I Dey Go" | Oyebanjo | Tefa; Cheekychizzy | 4:49 |
| 6. | "Turn Down for What" | Oyebanjo | Killertunes; Cheekychizzy | 3:42 |
| 7. | "Egweji" (featuring Phyno) | Oyebanjo; Chibuzor Azubuike | Cheekychizzy | 3:55 |
| 8. | "That's What I Mean" (featuring Kayswitch) | Oyebanjo; Kehinde Oyebanjo | Dr. Amir; Cheekychizzy | 4:22 |
| 9. | "Ntswempu" (featuring Bucie and Busiswa) | Oyebanjo; Busiswe Nqwiliso; Busiswa Gqulu | Ploops; Cheekychizzy | 3:52 |
| 10. | "Emergency" | Oyebanjo | Ploops | 3:26 |
| 11. | "Oliver Twist" | Oyebanjo; Michael Ajereh | Don Jazzy | 3:57 |
| 12. | "Shoulda" | Oyebanjo | Cheekychizzy; Shizzi | 3:31 |
| Total length: | | | | 46:36 |

== Personnel ==
- Oladapo "D'banj" Oyebanjo – main artist, writer
- Busiswe "Bucie" Nqwiliso – featured artist, writer
- Busiswa Gqulu – featured artist, writer
- Oluwatobi "Wande Coal" Ojosipe – featured artist, writer
- Radric "Gucci Mane" Davis – featured artist, writer
- Harrison "Harrysong" Okiri - featured artist, writer
- Chibuzor "Phyno" Azubuike – featured artist, writer
- Kehinde "Kayswitch" Oyebanjo – featured artist, writer
- Michael "Don Jazzy" Ajereh - producer, writer
- Chisom "Cheekychizzy" Ifeachor - producer
- Henry "Dr. Amir" Tonwe-Adebola - producer
- Oluwaseyi "Shizzi" Akerele - producer
- Ploops - producer
- Tefa - producer
- Otaniyen-Uwa "Killertunes" Daniel - producer
- Maleek "Berry" Shoyebi - producer
- Sesan Ogunro - video director
- Eif Rivera - video director
- Patrick Elis – video director

== Release history ==
Release history and formats for King Don Come
| Region | Date | Format | Label |
|---|---|---|---|
| Nigeria | 25 August 2017 | CD; digital download | DB; DKM Media |
