= Dr Paul Enenche =

Paul Enenche
- Born: Otukpo, Benue State
- Citizenship: Nigerian
- Occupations: Pastor, Physician, Author
- Known for: Founding Dunamis International Gospel Centre
- Spouse: Becky Enenche
- Children: Four [4]
- Website: dunamisgospel.org

Paul Eneche

Paul Enenche (born 1968) is a Nigerian Pentecostal Christian pastor, physician and author. He is the founder and senior pastor of the Dunamis International Gospel Centre (also known as Dunamis Church) headquartered in Abuja, which he established with his wife, Becky Enenche, in 1996. He is also the chancellor of Wesley University in Ondo; Ondo state the church began with 55 people and now has branches in Nigeria and abroad. It's headquarters auditorium, The Glory Dome, dedicated in 2018 with capacity of 100,000. Through the church's welfare department, Paul Enenche and his wife have led outreaches providing food, medical care, clean water and educational support to widows, orphan and low-income communities in the federal capital territory in October 2026 the church commissioned a pedestrian bridge on Abuja airport road, which the federal capital territory minister, Nyesome Wike, described as an exemplary model of corporate social responsibility.

== Early life and Education ==
Enenche was born on June 4, 1968, in Otukpo Benue state Nigeria. He trained as a medical doctor and he and his wife who is also a physician, practiced medicine in Jos, plateau state before moving to Abuja to establish the church.

== Ministry ==
Founded on November 10, 1996. The first service was held in a restaurant at the Centre for arts and culture (now the Cyprian Ekwensi arts and culture entre) in Garki. Enenche has said the name Dunamis comes from the Greek word, it means power. As attendance grew, the church used large public spaces for some of its gatherings. In a 2019 interview, Enenche said Dunamis had held Sunday services at Eagle Square and the Old Parade Ground in Abuja, and that in July 2007 it began overnight meetings at the National Stadium. He said the search for a covered venue of its own followed restrictions on the use of public venues and the difficulty of open-air meetings in bad weather. These are Enenche’s own recollections. The church marks its anniversary each November with the Kingdom Power Glory World Conference.

== The Glory Dome ==
The Glory Dome is the ministry's auditorium that serves as the headquarter of the Dunamis International Gospel Centre, on the church's ground along airport road in Abuja. It was dedicated by Professor Yemi Osinbajo the then Vice-President of Nigeria. In an interview with The Guardian newspaper after the dedication, Enenche said the church built the auditorium because its service has outgrown its earlier premises, with overflow crowds outside, they needed a single venue that could hold the whole congregation. He said the American company Geometrica took part in the project, that about 5000 workers of various trades were employed during the construction, which the church funded without bank loan or overdraft.

== Humanitarian and Community Works ==
Dunamis has a welfare department that runs relief programmes. Becky Enenche said church distributes food to needy members at its headquarters every Sunday and also distributes relief materials elsewhere in Nigeria and abroad.

In December 2024, leadership newspaper reported that Paul and Becky Enenche gave food and other essentials to about 5000 people, 540 widows, at a Christmas programme run through the welfare department. On 4th June 2025, Enenche's 57th birthday, he commissioned a borehole at Sabon Iddo Village in Abuja. a medical outreach there treated 500 widos,10 orphanages and also gave relief materials at the church headquarters.

On 30th october 2026, the church opened a pedestrian bridge on the Airport Road in Abuja, near the Glory dome. FCT minister, Nyesome Wike commissioned it. The News Agency of Nigeria (NAN) reported that the church paid for the bridge in full. At the ceremony, Enenche listed other church projects, these included road construction in Mararaba, karu and kubwa, boreholes in Borno state, and assistance to displaced people and flood victims in Maiduguri.

== Public engagement and Views ==
In an interview with The Guardian Newspaper, Enenche said the government can learn from the church, how churches stay relevant and manage resources. He also said that cultism among young people should first be handled at the household level, with parents guarding their children and not only through the government's institution of law enforcement.

== Publications ==
His publications address prayer, faith, purpose, leadership, financial principles, ministry, relationships and personal development. Some of the titles include:

- 1. Principle and power of prayer
- 2. Protocol suspended
- 3. Family wisdom
- 4. Created for a purpose
- 5. Who are you?
- 6. Thou art my battle axe
- 7. The essence of Christianity
- 8. Access to all Possibilities
- 9. 22 laws of life
- 10. Go in this thy might
- 11. Wisdom for distinction
- 12. Wisdom for the top
- 13. 21 Foolish Things people do
- 21 Uncommon keys to financial overflow etc

== Recognition ==
- Honorary Doctor of Divinity, Benue State University. February 2023
- Chancellor, Wesley University, Ondo

== Personal life ==
Paul is married to Becky Enenche, a physician who is also a senior pastor at Dunamis International Gospel Centre. They are blessed with four Children.
