= Project Fame West Africa =

Nigerian reality television series

- Also known as: Project Fame
- Genre: Reality, talent show
- Created by: Gboyega Ayoade
- Presented by: Joseph Benjamin; Bolanle Olukanni
- Judges: Praiz; Tee-Y Mix; Bibie; Gboye
- Country of origin: Nigeria
- Original language: English
- No. of seasons: 9
- No. of episodes: 5 per season

Production
- Executive producer: MTN Nigeria
- Producer: Ultima Limited

Original release
- Network: TV3 Ghana; Clare TV (Liberia); AIT (Nigeria); GET TV (Nigeria); MiTV (Nigeria); NTA (Nigeria); Nigerzie (Nigeria); ONTV(Nigeria); Silverbird (Nigeria); SoundCity (Nigeria); ABC TV (Sierra Leone)
- Release: 18 July 2008 – 2016

Project Fame, also known as Project Fame West Africa or MTN Project Fame West Africa (for sponsorship purposes), is a music talent reality show filmed in Lagos and aired in the West African subcontinent. It was a regional version of Star Academy reality series, which was developed and licensed internationally by Endemol. The show used to feature contestants from Ghana, Liberia, Nigeria and Sierra Leone, but Liberia and Sierra Leone have been dropped since the 2014 Ebola outbreak. The show was broadcast by networks in these four countries and across the African continent.

Run by Ultima production, Project Fame's inaugural season began in 2008. The production format consisted of gala evenings held each Sunday night in prime time and hosted by Joseph Benjamin and Adaora Oleh. In season 7, Adaora was replaced with Bolanle Olukanni. Additionally, there was a weekly recap show and the eviction night on Saturday night.

The jury was formed by three judges; Praiz, Bibie Brew and Tee-Y Mix, and Faculty members of the Academy which include: Joke Silva, Lovette Otegbola, Dupe Ige, Ben Ogbeiwi and Mr Gboyega Ayoade.

The show was notorious for its winners struggling to have continued success in the entertainment industry. Of all the contestants in the nine seasons, only Iyanya, Chidinma, Praiz, Niniola and Johnny Drille have gone on to make various degrees of success in music; season 5 winner Ayoola went on to become a television star

== Winners & Runners-up ==
Season	Year	Winner	Runner-up	Country	Host
1	2008	Iyanya		Nigeria	
2	2009	Mike Anyasodo		Nigeria	
3	2010	Chidinma		Nigeria	
4	2011	Monica Ogah		Nigeria	
5	2012	Ayoola	Marvellous Odiete	Nigeria	
6	2013	Olawale		Nigeria	
7	2014	Geoffrey Oji		Nigeria	
8	2015	Jeff Akoh		Nigeria	
9	2016	Okiemute Ighorodje		Nigeria	

== Season 3 (2010) ==
Candidate	Age	Residence	Result
Adebola Kester	29	Ghana	
Chidinma	22	Ikorodu, Nigeria	
Christian	22	Ashanti Region, Ghana	
Eyo	29	Lagos, Nigeria	
Kesse	24	Ghana	
Ochuko		Lagos, Nigeria	
Tolu Adesina	29	Kaduna, Nigeria	
Yetunde		Ibadan, Nigeria	
Joecelia Gbondo		Freetown, Sierra Leone	10th Evicted
Rhoda	26	Lagos, Nigeria	9th Evicted
Vwede Akpoguma		Benin, Nigeria	8th Evicted
Helen Pajebo-Jackson	23	Monrovia, Liberia	7th Evicted
Shehu	30	Kaduna, Nigeria	6th Evicted
Monica	24	Enugu, Nigeria	5th Evicted
Samuel Stryker		Monrovia, Liberia	4th Evicted
Modele	22	Abeokuta, Nigeria	3rd Evicted
Lindsey		Abuja, Nigeria	2nd Evicted
Gold	21	Lagos, Nigeria	1st Evicted

=== Gala evenings ===
1st Live Show - Contestant's choice

Order	Contestant	Song (Original Artist)	Result
1	Tolu	"When a Man Loves a Woman" (Michael Bolton)	Safe
2	Rhoda	"For You I Will" (Monica)	Safe
3	Lindsey	"Time After Time" (Cyndi Lauper)	Safe
4	Joecelia	"Breathe Again" (Toni Braxton)	Safe
5	Helen	"Nothing Compares To You" (Sinéad O'Connor)	Safe
6	Vwede	"Coast to Coast" (Westlife)	Safe
7	Yetunde	"You Gotta Be" (Des'ree)	Safe
8	Eyo	"I Just Called To Say I Love You" (Stevie Wonder)	Safe
9	Chidinma	"Stickwitu" (The Pussycat Dolls)	Safe
10	Shehu	"Careless Whispers" (George Michael)	Safe
11	Modele	"Same Old Love" (Anita Baker)	Safe
12	Kesse	"Rock Me Tonight" (Freddie Jackson)	Safe
13	Gold	"Smooth Operator" (Sade Adu)	Safe
14	Samuel	"Lady In Red" (Chris de Burg)	Safe
15	Adebola	"Where Do Broken Hearts Go" (Whitney Houston)	Safe
16	Monica	"Still the One" (Shania Twain)	Safe
17	Christian	"No Matter Why" (Boyzone)	Safe
18	Ocuhko	"My Girl" (Temptations)	Safe

2nd Live Show - Aṣa & Tracy Chapman

Mentor: Aṣa

Order	Contestant	Song (Original Artist)	Result
1	Yetunde	"Eye Adaba" (Aṣa)	Safe
2	Eyo	"Change" (Tracy Chapman)	Safe
3	Joecelia	"Fire on the Mountain" (Aṣa)	Bottom Five
4	Shehu	"Kiss the Rain" (Tracy Chapman)	Bottom Five
5	Modele	"You're the One" (Tracy Chapman)	Bottom Five
6	Tolu	"Jailer Man" (Aṣa)	Safe
7	Rhoda	"For My Love" (Tracy Chapman)	Safe
8	Lindsey	"Give Me One Reason" (Tracy Chapman)	Eliminated
9	Chidinma	"Fast Cars" (Tracy Chapman)	Safe
10	Helen	"Sorry" (Tracy Chapman)	Safe
11	Vwede	"If You Want Me" (Tracy Chapman)	Safe
12	Christian	"360 Degrees" (Aṣa)	Safe
13	Ochuko	"She's Got Her Ticket" (Tracy Chapman)	Safe
14	Samuel	"Peace" (Aṣa)	Safe
15	Adebola	"Iba" (Aṣa)	Safe
16	Monica	"Why?" (Tracy Chapman)	Safe
17	Gold	"Waidi" (Aṣa)	Eliminated
18	Kesse	"So Beautiful" (Aṣa)	Safe

3rd Live Show - Reggae

Mentor: Samini

Order	Contestant	Song (Original Artist)	Result
1	Ochuko	"Rock Me Baby" (Johnny Nash)	Safe
2	Christian	"I Shot the Sheriff" (Bob Marley)	Safe
3	Joecelia	"Cherry Oh Baby" (UB40)	Safe
4	Monica	"Pass the Dutchie" (Musical Youth)	Safe
5	Modele	"Rat Race" (Mandators)	Eliminated
6	Eyo	"Romba Stylee" (Ras Kimono)	Safe
7	Tolu	"Get Up, Stand Up" (Bob Marley)	Safe
8	Chidinma	"Gnashing of Teeth" (Mighty Diamonds)	Safe
9	Helen	"Just Don't Wanna be Lonely" (Freddie McGregor)	Bottom Five
10	Rhoda	"Mama Africa" (Peter Tosh)	Bottom Five
11	Vwede	"Kpobaro" (Evi Edna)	Safe
12	Samuel	"Don't Turn Around" (Aswad)	Eliminated
13	Adebola	"I Wanna Wake Up With You" (Boris Gardiner)	Bottom Five
14	Shehu	"Back To My Roots" (Lucky Dube)	Safe
15	Kesse	"Land of my Birth" (Eric Donaldson)	Safe
16	Yetunde	"I Need a Roof" (Mighty Diamonds)	Safe

4th Live Show - African Night

Mentor: Lagbaja

Order	Contestant	Song (Original Artist)	Result
1	Eyo	"Lady" (Fela)	Safe
2	Shehu	"Coolu Temper" (Lagbaja)	Eliminated
3	Joecelia	"I Shall Sing" (Miriam Makeba)	Safe
4	Monica	"Nigeria Go Survive" (Veno)	Eliminated
5	Kesse	"Dambebi" (Ofori Amponsah)	Safe
6	Chidinma	"Ipi Tombia" (Miriam Mekeba)	Safe
7	Rhoda	"I'm Burning Up" (Yvonne Chaka Chaka)	Bottom Five
8	Helen	"Taxi Driver" (Mandy Brown)	Safe
9	Vwede	"Rhumba Dance" (Mike Okri)	Bottom Five
10	Tolu	"Palava" (Fela)	Safe
11	Adebola	"Thank you Mr. DJ" (Yvonne Chaka Chaka)	Bottom Five
12	Yetunde	"Wombo Lombo" (Angélique Kidjo)	Safe
13	Christian	"Wo Se Keta A Bae Mu" (Daddy Lumba)	Safe
14	Ochuko	"Konko Below" (Lagbaja)	Safe

5th Live Show - Soft Rock and Soul

Mentor: Frank Edoho

Order	Contestant	Song (Original Artist)	Result
1	Adebola	"You Make Me Feel Like A Natural Woman" (Celine Dion)	Safe
2	Yetunde	"Big Girls Don't Cry" (Fergie)	Safe
3	Eyo	"Three Times A Lady" (Kenny Rogers)	Safe
4	Joecelia	"It's My House" (Diana Ross)	Safe
5	Kesse	"Knocking on Heaven's Door" (Bob Dylan)	Safe
6	Rhoda	"Runaway" (The Corrs)	Safe
7	Vwede	"Take My Breath Away" (Berlin)	Safe
8	Tolu	"First Cut Is The Deepest" (Rod Stewart)	Safe
9	Ochuko	"One More Night" (Phil Collins)	Safe
10	Christian	"If You Don't Know Me By Now" (Simply Red)	Safe
11	Helen	"Lake A Prayer" (Madonna)	Safe
12	Chidinma	"I Want To Know What Love Is" (Mariah Carey)	Safe

6th Live Show - Classic Duets & Evergreen Disco Songs

Mentor: Yinka Davies

Order	Contestant	Song (Original Artist)	Result
1	Eyo	"Same Girl" (Usher & R. Kelly)	Safe
1	Kesse	"Same Girl" (Usher & R. Kelly)	Safe
2	Christian	"Two Wrongs" (Wyclef Jean & Claudette Ortizt)	Bottom 5
2	Helen	"Two Wrongs" (Wyclef Jean & Claudette Ortizt)	Eliminated
3	Vwede	"Love of My Life" (George Benson & Roberta Flack)	Eliminated
3	Adebola	"Love of My Life" (George Benson & Roberta Flack)	Safe
4	Joecelia	"I Got You Babe" (UB40)	Safe
4	Ochuko	"I Got You Babe" (UB40)	Bottom 5
5	Tolu	"My Boo" (Usher & Alicia Keys)	Safe
5	Chidinma	"My Boo" (Usher & Alicia Keys)	Safe
6	Rhoda	"Frankie" (Sister Sledge)	Bottom 5
6	Yetunde	"Frankie" (Sister Sledge)	Safe
7	Eyo	"Cassanova" (Gerald Levert)	Safe
8	Kesse	"Ladies Man" (Kool & the Gang)	Safe
9	Helen	"Ain’t Nobody" (Chaka Khan)	Eliminated
10	Christian	"Rock The Boat" (The Hues Corporation)	Bottom 5
11	Vwede	"Night Shift" (The Commodores)	Eliminated
12	Adebola	"Staying Alive" (Bee Gees)	Safe
13	Joecelia	"I'm in Love" (Evlyn King)	Safe
14	Ochuko	"Wet My Whistle" (Midnight Star)	Bottom 5
15	Tolu	"Caribbean Quee" (Billy Ocean)	Safe
16	Chidinma	"I'm Every Woman" (Whitney Houston)	Safe
17	Yetunde	"Somebody Else's Guy" (Jocelyn Brown)	Safe
18	Rhoda	"Ring My Bell" (Anita Ward)	Bottom 5

7th Live Show - Afro-Caribbean night

Mentor: Onyeka Onwenu

Order	Contestant	Song (Original Artist)	Result
1	Adebola	"Halleluyah" (Onyeka Onwenu)	Bottom 5
2	Eyo	"Ifeoma" (Felix Lebarty)	Safe
3	Joecelia	"Baby Let Me Love You" (Bonny Macs)	Eliminated
4	Kesse	"Searching" (Bongos Ikwe)	Safe
5	Christian	"Bonsue" (Joe Mensah)	Safe
6	Yetunde	"Jafunmi" (Sunny Adé)	Bottom 5
7	Chidinma	"Ekwe" (Onyeka Onwenu)	Safe
8	Tolu	"You & I" (Onyeka Onwenu)	Safe
9	Rhoda	"Hot Hot Hot" (Mighty Diamonds)	Eliminated
10	Ochuko	"Afro Juju" (Sir Shina Peters)	Bottom 5

=== Elimination chart ===
Elimination Chart
	2	3	4	5	6	7	8	9	10	11	12	13	14	15
Adebola	IN	IN	IN	IN	IN	IN								
Chidinma	IN	IN	IN	IN	IN	IN								
Christian	IN	IN	IN	IN	IN	IN								
Eyo	IN	IN	IN	IN	IN	IN								
Kesse	IN	IN	IN	IN	IN	IN								
Ochuko	IN	IN	IN	IN	IN	IN								
Tolu	IN	IN	IN	IN	IN	IN								
Yetunde	IN	IN	IN	IN	IN	IN								
Rhoda	IN	IN	IN	IN	IN	OUT								
Joecelia	IN	IN	IN	IN	IN	OUT								
Vwede	IN	IN	IN	IN	OUT									
Helen	IN	IN	IN	IN	OUT									
Shehu	IN	IN	OUT											
Monica	IN	IN	OUT											
Samuel	IN	OUT												
Modele	IN	OUT												
Lindsey	OUT													
Gold	OUT													

The contestant won the show
The contestant lost in the final
The contestant was in the Bottom Five, but saved by the jury
The contestant was in the Bottom Five, but saved by the academy
The contestant was in the Bottom Five, but saved by the students
The contestant was eliminated

== Season 8 (2015) ==
Season 8 is being broadcast on TVC, MiTv, DBN, Soundcity, ONTv and GetTv, the finalists were Ada, Anderson, Arewa, Deinde, Jeff & pearl. Jeffrey Ufedo Akoh finished as the winner of season 8.
