= DKM =

DKM or dkm may refer to:

- Daniel Keys Moran (born 1962), US programmer and writer
- D'Kings Men, a 2013 Nigerian compilation album
- Dropkick Murphys, an American Celtic punk band
- Dyson Kissner-Moran, US investment firm involved in DKM Broadcasting (WDBZ)
- An unofficial ship prefix for Deutsche Kriegsmarine
- Downloadable kernel module, a loadable kernel module in VxWorks
- Abbreviation of German Drehkolbenmotor, used in the name of Wankel engines
