= Nigeria's Top Model =

Nigerian TV show

- Promotional Photograph of the Cast of Nigeria's Next Top Model
- Created by: Tyra Banks
- Starring: Agbani Darego
- Country of origin: Nigeria

Production
- Running time: 42 minutes (60 with commercials)

Original release
- Network: HiTV
- Release: April 27, 2007

Nigeria's Top Model was a television event in Nigeria. Originally the show was planned to be a multi-episode reality competition such as the original format of America's Next Top Model. However, after an unsuccessful attempt to gain the rights for the franchise it was modeled as a competition that only lasted one evening. It took place on April 27, 2007. The event was held in London with prizes such as a contract with acclaimed agency Select Models and immediate booking for shows in Johannesburg, Cape Town, Durban and others. Girls between 18 and 28 and who were at least 5'8 were allowed to compete.
In a pageant-style contest with fourteen chosen girls competing in order to win the title of Nigeria's Top Model. In the first round the girls were narrowed down to six and a second round resulted in the top 3 placements where Olabimitan Adeyinka took home victory. Given the big success the show enjoyed a second "Cycle" was planned but further plans did not surpass that stage.

== Judges ==
Two Top Models presented the show, they were:

- Adora Oleh
- Oreke

The judges were

- Jan Malan (Chief Judge - director of Umzingeli Productions)
- Adebayo Jones (Haute Couture Fashion Designer)
- Shevelle Rhule (Pride Magazine)
- Sarah Leon (Select Models)
- Charles Thomson
- Matthew Mensah
- Sesan Awonoiki
- Stefan Lindemann (editor Grazia Magazine)
- Aneka Johnson (Founder Miss Black Britain).

== Cycle Summary ==
Cycle	Premiere date	Winner	Runner-up	Other contestants in order of elimination	Number of contestants	International Destination(s)
1	April 27, 2007	Olabimitan Adeyinka	Peace Blessing Oyibo	Lola Omotosho, Olaide Aremu, Adaora Ilobi, Sarah Erhabor, Antoniette Adesina, Folake Abosede Ayobolu, Dabota Lawson, Annette Onaolapo, Tolu Faleti, Ivie Omoregie, Asari Mabel Usang, Ugochi Chiladzo Ogodo, Ivie Okhions	15	(United Kingdom); London

=== Contestants ===
(ages stated at time of contest)

Name	Age	Height	Hometown	Ranking
Olabimitan Adeyinka	20	1.78 m (5 ft 10 in)	Lagos State	Winner
Peace Blessing Oyibo	21	1.76 m (5 ft 9 1/2 in)	Imo State	Runner-up
Ivie Okhions	22	1.73 m (5 ft 8 in)	Edo State	3rd
Ugochi Chiladzo Ogodo	19	1.70 m (5 ft 7 in)	Ebonyi State	4th
Asari Mabel Usang	24	1.78 m (5 ft 10 in)	Cross Rivers State	5th
Ivie Omoregie	22	1.83 m (6 ft 0 in)	Edo State	6th
Tolu Faleti	25	1.73 m (5 ft 8 in)	Kaduna State	7th
Annette Onaolapo	22	1.73 m (5 ft 8 in)	Kwara State	8th
Dabota Lawson	19	1.73 m (5 ft 8 in)	Rivers State	9th
Folake Abosede Ayobolu	20	1.80 m (5 ft 11 in)	Osun State	10th
Antoniette Adesina	23	1.70 m (5 ft 7 in)	Ogun State	11th
Sarah Erhabor	20	1.73 m (5 ft 8 in)	Federal Capital Territory	12th
Adaora Ilobi	19	1.78 m (5 ft 10 in)	Anambra State	13th
Olaide Aremu	21	1.71 m (5 ft 7 1/2 in)	Oyo State	14th
Lola Omotosho	22	1.65 m (5 ft 5 in)	Ekiti State	15th
