= Oyato =

Single by D'banj
- Released: July 14, 2012
- Recorded: 2012
- Genre: Afropop
- Length: 3:24
- Label: DB; Sony
- Songwriter: Dapo Daniel Oyebanjo
- Producer: Jay Sleek

D'banj singles chronology
"Sister Caro" (2012)	"Oyato" (2012)	"Bachelor" (2012)

"Oyato" (Yoruba: "Different") is a song by Nigerian singer D'banj. Mcomm, a Nigerian music distribution network, released the song on July 14, 2012. "Oyato" is D'banj's first solo release since leaving Mo' Hits Records. According to the media company NotJustOk, the song fueled the singer's desire to reconnect with his devoted fan base following the success of "Oliver Twist" in the United Kingdom.

== D'banj's response to fans ==
D'banj thanked his fans for their support, saying, "Oyato is my special dedication to my fans who have stood by me through it all. Thank you for being there for me. The only way I can truly repay them is to keep on making great music that they will always enjoy and be proud of."

== Critical reception ==
An unnamed writer for NotJustOk praised D'banj for "proving his dexterity on his favorite instrument, the harmonica, and reiterating the message his fans have never been in doubt of". OkayAfrica's Kam Tambini said the song is "composed of synth melodies and heavy beat". In a review for Vanguard newspaper, Charles Mgbolu wrote that the singer "ran a chorus-verse1-chorus-verse2 pattern that abruptly wound down, while excluding his usual hook" and that the record "cast a stark picture of D'banj's recent travails".

== Performance ==
At Radio 1's Big Weekend, D'banj sang "Oyato" in front of more than 100,000 people.

== Audio release history ==
Country	Date	Format	Label
Nigeria	July 14, 2012	Digital download	DB Records, Def Jam Recordings
