= Bolanle Olukanni =

Nigerian TV and radio host

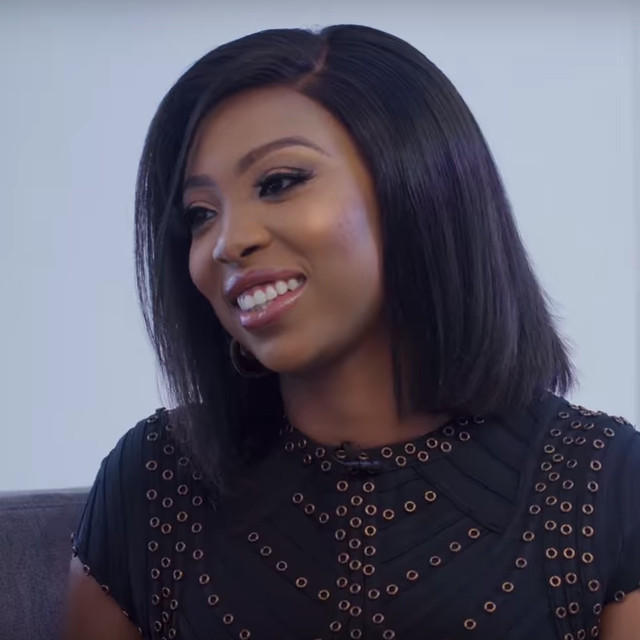
- on Ndani TV's The Juice in March 2019
- Born: 19 August
- Education: Loyola University, Chicago
- Occupation: Presenter

Bolanle Olukanni (born 19 August) is a Nigerian television host, actor, and radio host. She is known for hosting Moments with Mo on DStv and Project Fame West Africa. Olukanni is also the host of the International Women's Month special on Channels TV.

== Early life and education ==
Olukanni was raised in Nigeria, Israel, America and Kenya. She started her primary education at St Saviour's School Ikoyi in Lagos and then went on to Queen's College, Lagos for secondary school. She moved to Kenya where she attended Rosslyn Academy in Nairobi for part of her high school. Before her final year of high school, she moved to the United States where she attended Wichita Southeast High School in Wichita, Kansas, and for her senior year participating in the National Speech and Debate Association Tournament for Dramatic Interpretation.

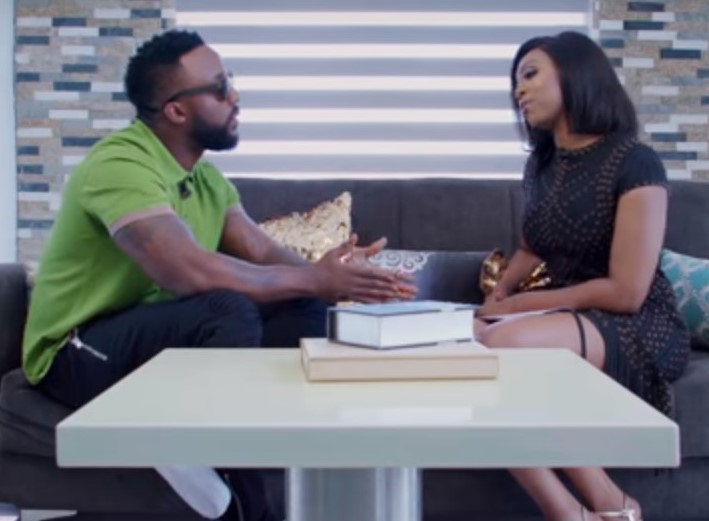
Olukanni interviewing Iyanya in 2019

In 2011, Olukanni received a Bachelor's degree from Loyola University, Chicago, with a double degree – Bachelors of Arts in both Communications and International Studies. Bolanle moved back to Nigeria for her mandatory National Youth Service Corps (NYSC), where she spent her service year working for a non-profit organization in Ekiti State, South West, Nigeria.

During her NYSC service year, Olukanni and a fellow corp member started ‘’Girls For The Future’’, a gender-based empowerment workshop for secondary school students teaching the girl child of their rights and providing mentorship for the students in the community.

== Career ==
Olukanni's first TV job was a co-host on “Moments with Mo” after being chosen out of over 400 other hopefuls to host alongside talk show host and CEO of EbonyLife TV, Mo Abudu. “Moments with Mo” which has now evolved into ‘’Moments’’ is Africa’s first daily talk show and aired on M-Net with TV coverage in 48 African countries, the show now also airs on terrestrial and cable TV in other parts of the world. While hosting ‘’Moments’’, she had the opportunity to interview a variety of inspiring and influential individuals and public office holders including the President of Nigeria, Muhammadu Buhari; British-Nigerian actor, Chiwetel Ejiofor; American singer-songwriter, Brandy; Nigeria’s Minister of Power, Works and Housing – Babatunde Raji Fashola; BBC’s journalist, Zeinab Badawi, and many more.

In 2014, Olukanni joined the hit music talent TV reality show Project Fame West Africa as a host alongside Joseph Benjamin. Project Fame, a regional version of Star Academy reality series aired across the West African subcontinent. Alongside co-host Lamide Akintobi, Olukanni was a host on a 4-part interview series - ‘’With Mikel’’ that gave a glimpse into the life and home of former Nigerian and Chelsea football player Mikel John Obi. In 2019, Bolanle hosted THE JUICE, a flagship talk show on NdaniTV that profiled top entertainment personalities in Africa. On THE JUICE, she interviewed popular African entertainment personalities including Davido, Iyanya, Aṣa, and Cobhams Asuquo. Bolanle is the first ever female and two-time anchor of NEC Live, Nigerian Entertainment Conference an annual entertainment conference broadcast on HipTV and several other online platforms. Olukanni hosted the Trophy Extra special band talent hunt show alongside Big Brother Naija Finalist Victoria ‘Vee’ Adeleye and judges, Timi Dakolo; Cobhams Asuquo; and 2Baba.

As an event host, Olukanni has compèred and moderated a range of events such as the UKAid/Department for International Development ‘Not for Sale’ launch, The Rebuild Borno Summit in partnership with UNICEF, United Bank for Africa CEO Awards, The Future Awards Africa, Social Media Week and most recently she was the co-host of the Vanguard Personality of the Year Awards and the International Advertising Association conference in Ghana and Romania.

=== Business ventures ===
In 2015, Bolanle co-founded Sage & Walls, a multimedia production company and began producing and hosting "On the Carpet with Bolinto" a red-carpet show covering A-list events in Africa. “On the Carpet with Bolinto” has partnered with several brands including Coca-Cola, Uber, Heineken, and Martell. It was also an official media partner for the acclaimed King Sunny Adé at 70 concert in 2016.

In 2019, Olukanni co-founded Wash & Go, a simple concept natural hair salon with focused services.

== Philanthropy ==
Olukanni founded the Olukanni Legacy Foundation, an NGO that focuses on social justice and creating a more equitable society. Bolanle is also currently a board member of the Self-Worth organization- a nonprofit that provides empowerment and support to widows and single mothers in Nigeria. Olukanni is a board member of the Transformative Leadership and Sustainable Development Initiative a forum focused on Youth, Governance and Development.

In 2017, Bolanle founded the God's Wives Foundation, an nonprofit that raises funds and provides funding for skills acquisition centers focused on the vulnerable groups - widows and single mothers. Inspired by the resilience of women she met, Olukanni wrote, directed, and produced her first documentary “Gods Wives”’. in 2019. The documentary was used as a fundraiser for the women and went on to be nominated as “Best Documentary” by the African Magic Viewer's Choice Awards.

== Personal life ==
Olukanni was born on August 19. In her spare time, she enjoys reading a good novel, writing poetry and watching movies.

== Filmography ==
=== Movies ===
Year	Movie	Role	Notes
2017	Isoken	Rume	Comedy / Drama / Romance

=== Television shows ===
Year	Title	Role	Notes
2017	Our Best Friend's Wedding	Darlene	1 episodes
2018	Shuga (TV series)	Uju	10 episodes
2020	The Smart Money Woman	Senami	2 episodes

=== Documentaries ===
Year	Title	Role
2017	God's Wives	Writer, Director, and Producer

== Awards and nominations ==
Year	Award	Category	Result	Ref
2016	The Future Awards Africa	On Air Personality	Won	
2021	Net Honours	Most Popular Media Personality (female)	Nominated	
