= Sammie Okposo =

Nigerian gospel artist (1971–2022)

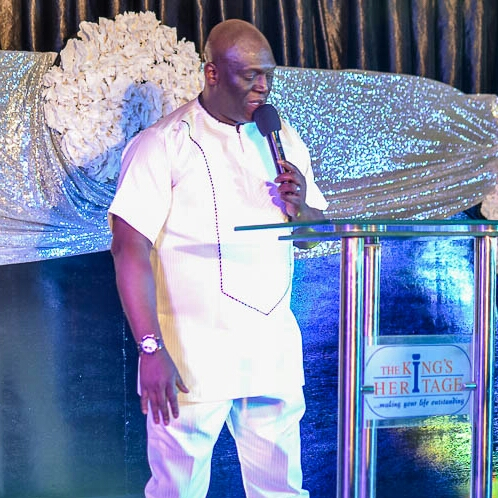
- Okposo performing in 2016

Background information
- Born: Sammie Okposo; 30 May 1971
- Died: 25 November 2022 (aged 51)
- Genres: Gospel
- Occupations: Singer, psalmist, producer
- Years active: 1992–2022
- Label: Zamar Entertainment
- Spouse: Ozioma Okposo (m. 2010)

Sammie Okposo (30 May 1971 – 25 November 2022) was a Nigerian gospel artist. Okposo was also a music producer, psalmist, and CEO of Zamar Entertainment. He released his debut album, Unconditional Love in 2000 and his sophomore album Addicted in 2004.

Okposo collaborated with many other artists in the gospel and soul music fields. He collaborated with popular gospel singer Marvellous Odiete on "Follow You" and American gospel singer Jonathan Nelson on Oghene Doh, has performed regularly in Africa, Europe, and North America, and curated a series of concerts called SOPP (Sammie Okposo Praise Party). His most recent album, The Statement (2018), was produced by the Grammy-winning Kevin Bond.

== Career ==
In 1992, Okposo became a soundtrack producer in the Nigerian movie industry. This was the official start of his career as a producer. He then switched to making music.

When he released his first album, "Unconditional Love," in 2000, with the hit single "Welu-Welu," he shook up the music business. Okposo was known all over the world and won many awards in Nigeria.

== Personal life and death ==
Okposo was married to Ozioma Onuzulike Sammie Okposo for 12 years before publicly apologising to his wife, Ozioma, via his Instagram page on 24 January 2022, following his infidelity with a U.S.-based woman known as African Doll. The apology came a day after African Doll, accused him of impregnating and abandoning her. Okposo told his fans that he would be taking a step back from his ministry to focus on restoration and seek forgiveness. He initially deactivated his social media handles, but restored them a few days later.

Okposo died on 25 November 2022, at the age of 51.

== Awards and recognition ==
Year	Award	Category	Result
2003	Kora Awards, South Africa	Best Male Gospel Artiste in Africa	Nominated
2006	Afro Hollywood Awards UK	Best Gospel Artiste in English	Won
2013	Nigeria Entertainment Awards, New York City	Best Gospel Artist	Won
2014	SABC Crown Gospel Music Awards (SA)	Best of Africa Gospel	Won
2015	The Beatz Awards	Best Afro High life Artiste	Won
2016	Atlanta Georgia USA-Trail Blazer Award	Best of African gospel awards	Won
2022	SOAR Awards 2022, USA	International Artist Of The Year	Won
