= Jeff Akoh =

Nigerian singer

- Born: Jeffrey Ufedo Akoh; 27 October 1996 (age 29); Abuja, FCT, Nigeria
- Genres: Pop
- Occupations: Singer, songwriter, performer
- Instrument: Vocals
- Years active: 2015–present
- Labels: Temple Music Limited, Ultima Productions, 960 Music Group

Jeff Ufedo Akoh (born 27 October 1996) is a Nigerian singer. He rose to prominence after winning the eighth season of Project Fame West Africa in 2015. He won the competition at the age of 18, making him the youngest winner so far.

== Early life and education ==
Akoh was born and raised in the Abuja. He attended Shining Star Nursery and Primary School, Abuja and later, Federal Government Boys College, Garki, Abuja. He has two siblings, a brother and sister, who are both musically inclined.

== Career ==
In 2010, Akoh and his brother, Fred, contested as a duo on Glo Naija Sings when he was 13. They finished inthe Top 10.

Akoh then went to SAE Institute, Cape Town, South Africa, where he graduated as a sound engineer.

In 2025, Akoh won the eighth season of Project Fame West Africa. Shortly after, he was offered a management deal with 960 Music Group and Ultima Productions. He is currently signed to Temple Music, under the umbrella of Temple Management company.

In 2017, he released a 16-track album titled Lokoja. In 2018 he followed up with an EP titled I Do. The lead single "I Do" was produced by Don Jazzy and Password. Its official video amassed over 4 million views on YouTube.

In June 2020, Akoh dropped "Better Things". oO 30 December 2020, he released the remix of the song featuring Peruzzi.
