= Okiemute =

Okiemute Ighorodje professionally known as Okiemute, is a Nigerian Afropop singer and songwriter

== Early life ==
She started singing at an early age competing in local street competitions, and at age 14 she became a studio vocalist, gaining experience in different genres of music.

== Music career ==
Okiemute won 9th edition of the music reality show Project Fame West Africa in 2016, after which she released her first single titled Good Luving. She later released her first EP in 2017, and has worked with producers such as Masterkraft and GospelOnDeBeatz. She released a single titled "African Wonder" in June 2018, and another single titled "WOSA" on November 16, 2018. She signed to Flux Factory, and in 2019, her collaboration Money from GospelOnDeBeatz's album Flux was at number four on MTV Base top 10 countdown. On the 1st of November, 2019 she released her new EP titled A Star and the video of her single, "Trouble". The four-track EP features "Turn Up", "Lau Lau", "Trouble" and "Omokalakuta".

== Personal life ==
She is a Linguistics and Communications graduate from University of Port Harcourt. She is from a family of 6 and the third of four girls.
