= Njideka Agbo =

Media Executive

Njideka Agbo is a Nigerian journalist and media executive. She currently serves as the director of the West Africa Interest Group for the International Association of Business Communicators (IABC) Africa Regional Executive Board. She is also the founder and principal consultant of GLANN Media Consult, and former editor-in-chief of The Guardian Life Magazine.

== Background ==
Agbo holds a BA degree in Mass Communication and a master's degree in communication from the University of Nigeria, Nsukka. She completed Executive Education in Public Narrative: Leadership, Storytelling and Action at Harvard Kennedy School.

== Career ==
From 2019, Njideka Agbo served as editor-in-chief of Guardian Life Magazine curating interviews with Ngozi Okonjo-Iweala, Tunde Onakoya, William Troost-Ekong, and more until 2022. Under her leadership, notable people including Amina J. Mohammed, the Black Lives Matter co-founder Opal Tometi, and Adichie wrote and published their own covers on the magazine, and it also featured exclusives with global stars including Idris Elba, Daniel Kaluuya, and more. Guardian Life addressed social issues and welcomed professors and professionals including Egemba Chinonso Fidelis, Dipo Awojide, and Solomon Buchi to contribute. Following her exit, Agbo founded Glann Media Consult in 2023 with a client roster including Grammy-nominated artist Mr Eazi, bestselling author Chimamanda Ngozi Adichie, the Ooni of Ife, and more. Alongside Nigerian journalist, Festus Iyorah, Agbo acted as an official co-judge of the 2024 Community Report Awards organized by Ikeja Record to spotlight untold stories by journalists in Lagos State.

In July 2026, Agbo was appointed director of the West Africa Interest Group for the International Association of Business Communicators (IABC) Africa Regional Executive Board.

== Recognition ==
Njideka Agbo was among the 100 Africans from 40 countries celebrated at the Royal African Young Leadership Forum and Awards organized by the Ooni of Ife in 2024.

In 2019, Agbo was nominated for "Editor of the Year" at the prestigious Nigeria Media Merit Awards.
