= Adora Oleh =

Nigerian TV host

- Born: Surrey, England
- Education: London School of Journalism
- Occupations: Journalist, TV Presenter, Model
- Known for: Hosted Project Fame West Africa
- Spouse: Single
- Website: http://adoraoleh.com/

Adora Oleh is a British-born Nigerian TV presenter and the second co-host of MTN Project Fame, which she hosted for five years. On 8 December 2013, Oleh won the most popular female TV presenter award in the Nigerian Broadcasters Merit Awards, which took place in Lagos. She used to host her talk show The Adora Oleh Show on Vox Africa, an entertainment programme that focuses on positive role models and entrepreneurs making waves (especially in entertainment, fashion, and business).

== Early life and education ==
Adora Oleh was born and raised in Surrey, England, as the eldest of three children of her parents. Oleh studied law at the university and holds a postgraduate diploma in media law and journalism and another postgraduate degree in public relations from the London School of Journalism.

== Career ==
=== Hosting & journalism ===
Oleh worked at MTV Base in 2002. Alongside Joseph Benjamin, she cohosted Project Fame West Africa, a music talent TV reality show in 2009 and was the host for consecutive 5 years. In 2012, Oleh made her debut as a television presenter on American TV station Fox News. On this job, she covered the birth of Prince Williams first royal baby. She then presented on the fashion TV station TOPSHOP TV in London as a fashion correspondent, where she reviews key fashion trends when she interviews top designers and models. She and her sister, Chika Oleh, are the co-owners of Chiad TV Productions, a television production and events company. Her talk show The Adora Oleh Show was produced by her production company and aired on AIT, DSTV Nigeria, Silverbird TV and SKY's VOX Africa UK. She was the co-host of the show Nigeria's Top Model, which was created by Tyra Banks.

=== Modeling ===
In 2012, Oleh was part of the judging panel for Lagos Fashion and Design Week: Young Designers of the Year. At the event, she was also the muse for the California-born Nigerian fashion designer Emmy Collins in his first female couture line.

== Awards & Ambassadorship ==
Oleh became the African Ambassador in 2013 for Guinness ‘Snapp’, an apple cocktail beverage. She was nominated for 'Brand Ambassador of the Year' at the 2013 Exquisite Lady of the Year Awards (ELOY) for her role as the ambassador for Snapp.

In 2013, Oleh was nominated in the Most Popular Female TV Presenter category at the Nigerian Broadcasters Merit Awards, where she emerged as the winner.
