= Finally (D'banj song) =

Single by D'banj

from the album D'Kings Men
- Released: 20 June 2013
- Recorded: 2013
- Genre: EDM; pop
- Length: 4:00
- Label: DB; Sony
- Songwriter: Dapo Daniel Oyebanjo
- Producer: DeeVee

D'banj singles chronology
"Top of the World" (2013)	"Finally" (2013)	"Feeling the Nigga" (2014)

"Finally" is a song recorded by Nigerian singer D'banj for the compilation album, D'Kings Men (2013). The song serves as the tenth commercial single from the album, which features collaborations between members of D'banj's DB Records label. The track premiered at a promotional event for the record, which was headlined by several Nigerian artists, including the singer. Written by D'Banj and produced by DeeVee, the recording is an EDM and pop song with lyrics predicting that any girl will beg for D'banj's love and compassion.

The recording was generally well received by contemporary music critics, who reached a consensus predicting that it would be successful both commercially and critically. An accompanying music video was released on 2 October of the same year and features the singer performing at night at a party in a forest.

== Background and composition ==
"Finally" was released on 20 June 2013 through DB Records and Sony Music Entertainment, the former of which is a joint effort co-created by D'banj himself. A sneak peek of the official recording was released one day prior to the Nigerian radio station, Lagos BEAT 99.9 FM. The track is featured on the compilation album, D'Kings Men (2013), which is full of collaborations created by recording artists under DB Records. Four days after the initial release of "Finally", the singer released the parent record on 24 June 2013 following a concert held at a Nigerian hotel; at the event, he performed the single live for the first time to a crowd of individuals within the music and entertainment industries. To further promote the track, he partnered with Nigerian music download website NotJustOk for a promotional dance competition, where participants would submit videos of themselves dancing to the song in order to win an unnamed prize.

An EDM and pop song that was written by D'banj and produced by DeeVee. According to Don Boye from tooXclusive, the singer's approach on the track was simple, consisting of an "amazing beat" with fairly "basic lyrics". Lyrically, "Finally" details the singer's "subliminal" and "egotistic[al]" side, featuring the protagonist begging: "You will love me finally / You will need me finally / You will want me finally".

== Reception ==
"Finally" was generally well received by contemporary music critics. Boye acclaimed the recording and stated that the singer "knew this number would cause a frenzy", in addition to declaring it a "potential chart topper". A different critic from tooXclusive described "Finally" as a "confirmed hit" and predicted that it would be very successful on Nigerian radio. Oye Akideinde from the music website 360 Nobs listed the single in their "360Recommends" column and claimed: "D'banj is back in the building with this hot new single." Commercially, it was listed on MTV Base's Official Naija Top Ten chart, where it debuted and peaked at the bottom position of number ten for the week of 25 October through 31 October 2013.

== Music video ==
An accompanying music video for "Finally" was released through D'banj's official YouTube account on 2 October 2013. It was directed by Sesan under his MKN Productions company. The video opens with a graphic displaying DB Records' label, and continues with D'banj shooting an arrow into the sky with a bow. Several rounds of fireworks and bright-coloured lighting flash above him in the night sky as he dances in a forest surrounded by background dancers and huskies. As the song's bridge begins, it is revealed that the group is actually singing in front of a live audience before the video concludes with a group of birds flying away. Ovie O. from NotJustOk claimed that the video's release was worth the wait, while tooXclusive's Tyler Sotubo was excited by the created hype and noted that Nigerian recording artist Wizkid made a cameo within the visual.

== Charts ==
Chart (2013)	Peak position
Nigeria (Official Naija Top Ten)	10
