= Fade Ogunro =

- Born: Ekiti State, Nigeria
- Education: University of Roehampton
- Occupations: On-air personality, radio presenter, television presenter, film producer, fashion designer
- Years active: 2010–present
- Employer(s): Radio Continental; PM News; The Guardian; 234Next; The Beat 99.9 FM
- Organization(s): Bookings Africa; FilmFactoryNG
- Known for: Founder and CEO of Bookings Africa; Co-owner of FilmFactoryNG
- Title: Chief Executive Officer, Bookings Africa
- Relatives: Sesan Ogunro Snr (father); Sesan Ogunro (brother)

Fade Ogunro is a Nigerian on-air-personality, radio and TV presenter, film producer, and fashion designer. She is the founder and chief executive officer of Bookings Africa, an online talent service platform operating across Africa. A native of Ekiti State in southwestern Nigeria, Ogunro is multilingual and speaks English, French, and Spanish.

== Education and career ==
Fade Ogunro left Nigeria to the United Kingdom with her parents when she was 7 years old. She studied journalism and creative writing in Roehampton University, UK. After her university education, she worked for Google in the UK. In 2010, Ogunro returned to Nigeria and began working at Radio Continental. She subsequently worked with several Nigerian media organisations, including PM News, The Guardian, 234Next, and The Beat 99.9 FM. At The Beat 99.9 FM, she hosted weekend radio programmes and co-hosted the television show Glam Report.She resigned from Beat 99.9 FM radio in 2016.

In April 2019, she launched a new app called Bookings Africa. The app enables participants to search for individuals with different talents, reaches these people, get the prices for their services and compare such prices with other service providers. The app has over 14 talent categories and is available in Nigeria, Kenya and South Africa

Fade Ogunro is the co-owner and Head of Production at FilmFactoryNG, a Nigeria-based video production company. She is also the creator and host of the fashion programme Fashion Friday with Fade. She is the first African woman to sit on the Global Campaign Board of Cherie Blair Foundation For Women, a foundation that helps discover women entrepreneurs in low and middle income countries.

Ogunro is a former ballerina. She is sponsoring Anthony Mmesoma Madu, an 11 year old ballerina whose video went viral in 2020.

== Personal life ==
Ogunro is the daughter of Sesan Ogunro Snr, one of the pioneer Advertising practitioners in Nigeria who was murdered in 2013. She is sister to video director Sesan Ogunro and they run production company, Film Factory together.

== See also ==
- The Ascension (2face Idibia album)
- Shiloh Godson
