= Don't Tell Me Nonsense =

Single by D'banj

from the album D'Kings Men
- Released: March 30, 2013
- Recorded: 2013
- Genre: Afrobeats; electro
- Length: 3:41
- Label: DB; Sony
- Songwriter: Oladapo Daniel Oyebanjo
- Producers: Jay Sleek; DeeVee

D'Kings Men singles chronology
"Cashflow" (2013)	"Don't Tell Me Nonsense" (2013)	"For Example" (2013)

Music video
- "Don't Tell Me Nonsense" on YouTube

"Don't Tell Me Nonsense" is a song by Nigerian singer D'banj. It serves as the seventh single from the compilation album, D'Kings Men, and peaked at number one on Afribiz's Top 100 music chart. Moreover, the song peaked at number one on the MTV Base Official Naija Top 10 Chart for the week of September 13 through September 19, 2013. "Don't Tell Me Nonsense" reached number twenty one on YFM 99.2's Y Urban Top 40 chart.

== Music video ==
The accompanying music video for "Don't Tell Me Nonsense" was filmed in Lagos by Matt Max. It features helicopters, smoke bombs, and an army of dancers.

== Accolades ==
The music video for "Don't Tell Me Nonsense" was nominated for Video of the Year, Best Afro Pop Video and Best Use of Choreography at the 2013 Nigeria Music Video Awards (NMVA). Moreover, it was nominated for Best African Act Video at the 5th edition of the 4Syte TV Music Video Awards.

== Track listing ==
Digital single

No.	Title	Writer(s)	Length
1.	"Don't Tell Me Nonsense"	Dapo Oyebanjo	3:41
