= An Epic Journey =

EP by D'banj
- Released: 25 September 2015
- Genre: Afro pop
- Length: 24:14
- Label: DB; DKM
- Producer: DeeVee; 2Kriss; Shadow Boxxer; Tibo

D'banj chronology
D'Kings Men (2013)	An Epic Journey (2015)	King Don Come (2017)

Singles from An Epic Journey
- 1. "Feeling the Nigga (Remix)" Released: 1 January 2015; 2. "Extraordinary" Released: 6 May 2015; 3. "Knocking on My Door" Released: 13 July 2015; 4. "Salute" Released: 22 July 2015; 5. "Confidential" Released: 17 August 2015; 6. "Frosh" Released: 24 September 2015

An Epic Journey is the first EP by Nigerian musician D'banj, released for digital download on 25 September 2015 by DB Records and DKM Media. It was created to commemorate D'banj's 10-year-anniversary of being in the music industry. Developed as a visual EP, it features guest appearances from Akon, Idris Elba, Shadow Boxxer, Cassper Nyovest, Reminisce, and Ice Prince. Production was primarily handled by DB Records' in-house producer DeeVee, with assistance from 2Kriss, Tibo, and Shadow Boxxer.

== Background and promotion ==
D'banj announced plans for a project in 2013 to mark his tenth year in his music career. In 2015, he confirmed the release of a visual EP titled I'm D’banj: An Epic Journey (later shortened to just An Epic Journey), structured as part of the anniversary celebrations. The project consisted of seven tracks, each accompanied by a music video. According to representatives of DB Records, the EP followed a staggered release format, with one song and video issued weekly over seven weeks, concluding in August 2015. Ahead of the rollout, video trailers for the tracks "Knocking on My Door (Ko Le Ye Won)" and "Confidential" were released on YouTube. In an interview with Beat FM, he hinted that Don Jazzy would be involved in the production of An Epic Journey.

== Singles ==
On 5 December 2014, D'banj released a single titled "Feeling the Nigga", produced by DeeVee. Akon featured on the official remix to "Feeling the Nigga", which was released as the EP's lead single on 1 January 2015. It was originally intended to be part of Akon's unreleased fourth studio album Stadium: World. Following its release, the song was subject to claims about its ownership, which D'banj addressed in an interview with Olisa Adibua, stating that the track was his and that Akon appeared only on the official remix. Akon stated in an interview with Notjustok TV that he and D'banj had known each other for several years before deciding to collaborate. A studio session video of the two recording the single, surfaced in October 2014, with the song being mistakenly titled as "Frosh", which was actually the EP's fifth single. Behind-the-scenes photos of the song's music video, shot in Atlanta, were revealed on 21 October 2014.

"Sextraordinary" and "Knocking on My Door" were initially performed on 18 April 2015 at the Global Citizen Earth Day concert held at the Washington Monument grounds in Washington, D.C., organized by the Global Poverty Project and the Earth Day Network in partnership with the World Bank. "Sextraordinary" was later retitled "Extraordinary", and was officially released as the second single from An Epic Journey on 6 May 2015. The song addresses gender equality, and its accompanying music video features footage of D'banj performing at the event, with appearances from will.i.am, Common, Usher, Chris Martin, and Fally Ipupa. The harmonica-infused third single, "Knocking on My Door", was released on 13 July 2015. The official music video for the song was released five days later and directed by D'banj and Moe Musa. Oritse Femi featured on the official remix of "Knocking on My Door", which follows their last collaboration, on the remix to Femi's "Double Wahala". The Ice Prince-assisted "Salute" was released on 22 July 2015 as the EP's fourth single. The song was produced by DeeVee; photos surfaced of the two recording the music video for the collaboration in May 2015. Directed by Moe Musa, the video was shot in Atlanta with cameos from Kelvin Boj and Tunde Ednut.

The EP's fifth single "Confidential" features Sierra Leonean rapper Shadow Boxxer and English actor Idris Elba (going by the pseudonym Driis), and was released on 17 August 2015. The song was initially leaked in March 2014 as a Shadow Boxxer single. The accompanying music video for "Confidential" was filmed in a black and white theme by Thomas Ikimi. Upon release, the song received mixed reviews. Aribaba of Jaguda gave the song a rating of 2/5, describing D'banj as "one of the greats," however stating, "if he continues to release stuff like this, I'm afraid it might be time to hang it up, and go upper management." Another editor for Jaguda placed the song at #7 in their list of 9 International Collaborations That Turned Out To Be Major Flops. Kam Tambini of OkayAfrica said "Driis delivers a pretty impressive verse as he, D'banj and Shadow Boxxer brag about their top credentials, hotel suites and conquests over a stuttering beat and pop synthesizers." Reviewing the leaked version, a writer for GTCrea8 treated the collaboration as an unexpected success, describing the Shadow Boxxer-led track as an "instant winner" where D'banj added familiar flair and Idris Elba's outro boosted its replay value. The fifth and final single off the EP, "Frosh", features Akon and was released on 24 September 2015, alongside its music video. Behind-the-scenes footage of it revealed in October 2014.

== Track listing ==
An Epic Journey track listing
No.	Title	Writer(s)	Producer(s)	Length
1.	"Extraordinary"	Dapo Oyebanjo	2Kriss	3:14
2.	"Knocking on My Door"	Oyebanjo	DeeVee	3:21
3.	"Feeling the Nigga" (remix; featuring Akon)	Oyebanjo; Aliaune Thiam	DeeVee	3:44
4.	"Frosh" (featuring Akon)	Oyebanjo; Thiam	DeeVee	4:09
5.	"Salute" (featuring Ice Prince)	Oyebanjo; Panshak Zamani	DeeVee	3:31
6.	"Confidential" (featuring Idris Elba and Shadow Boxxer)	Oyebanjo; Idrissa Elba; Algassimu Jarr Jr.	Shadow Boxxer; DeeVee	2:28
7.	"The King Is Here" (featuring Cassper Nyovest and Reminisce)	Dapo Oyebanjo; Refiloe Phoolo; Remilekun Safaru	Tibo; DeeVee	3:17
Total length:				24:14

== Release history ==
Release history and formats for An Epic Journey
Region	Date	Format	Label
Various	25 September 2015	Digital download	DB; DKM
