= D'Kings Men =

Compilation album by DB Records
- Released: June 24, 2013
- Recorded: 2012–2013
- Genres: Afrobeats; hip hop
- Length: 71:54
- Labels: DB; Sony
- Producers: Dee Vee; Jay Sleek; Don Jazzy; 2Kriss

D'banj chronology
The Entertainer (2008)	D'Kings Men (2012)	An Epic Journey (2015)

Singles from D'Kings Men
- 1. "Oliver Twist" Released: August 12, 2011; 2. "Sister Caro" Released: June 9, 2012; 3. "Bachelor" Released: November 10, 2012; 4. "Top of the World" Released: December 13, 2012; 5. "Cashflow" Released: December 21, 2012; 6. "Don't Tell Me Nonsense" Released: March 30, 2013; 7. "For Example" Released: March 30, 2013; 8. "Why You Love Me" Released: April 21, 2013; 9. "Finally" Released: June 20, 2013; 10. "Obimo (My Heart)" Released: June 22, 2013

D'Kings Men is a compilation album by recording artists of Nigerian record label DB Records. It was released on June 24, 2013, by the label and Sony Music. The album was largely produced by Dee Vee, along with additional production from Jay Sleek, Don Jazzy, and 2Kriss. Primarily recorded by DB Records signees D'banj, Kayswitch, and J.Sol, the album features collaborations with Kanye West, Big Sean, Snoop Lion, Fally Ipupa, Durella, Olamide, Ikechukwu and Naeto C. D'Kings Men was supported by the singles "Oliver Twist", "Sister Caro", "Bachelor", "Top of the World", "Cashflow", "Don't Tell Me Nonsense", "For Example", "Finally", "Why You Love Me" and "Obimo (My Heart)". The album received mixed reviews from music critics, who panned its lyrics and sound.

== Background and release ==
D'banj started recording the album and establishing DB Records before parting with Don Jazzy, who was his longstanding business partner. Since its inception, multiple acts have signed to the label, including Kayswitch, J.Sol, Jay Sleek, Durella and Dee Vee. In an interview with Seun Apara, D'banj said Don Jazzy produced four songs on the album and that the record consists of a compilation of songs recorded by himself, Kayswitch, and J.Sol. In an effort to curb piracy, the album was made available for purchase at all GT Bank offices in Nigeria and sent to consumers who pre-ordered it from D'banj's official website.

D'Kings Men was released on iTunes a day after D'banj and 2 Chainz headlined the DKM concert on June 23, 2013, at the Eko Hotels and Suites. The concert featured additional performances from Kayswitch, Phyno, Olamide, Mafikizolo, Fally Ipupa, and Naeto C. Guest in attendance included Ayo Makun, Kenya Moore, and Toolz, among others.

== Singles ==
The album's lead single, "Oliver Twist", was released on August 12, 2011. Sesan Ogunro directed the music video, which includes cameos from Kanye West, Pusha T, Big Sean, and Manny Fresh. The D'banj-assisted track "Sister Caro" was released on June 9, 2012, as the album's second single. The accompanying music video for the song was filmed in Lagos. "Bachelor" was released on November 10, 2012, as the album's third single. Its music video was also filmed by Sesan in Atlanta.

The album's fourth single, "Top of the World", was released on December 13, 2012. It was the official SuperSport anthem for the 2013 African Nations Cup. The music video for "Top of the World", which was recorded in South Africa, features scenes of D’banj singing into a forest of mics while performing with a dreadlocked guitarist and rock drummer. "Cashflow," a song featuring Kayswitch, was released as the album's fifth single on December 21, 2012. Sesan also directed the song's music video. The album's sixth single, "Don't Tell Me Nonsense", was released on March 30, 2013. The song's music video, which was filmed in Lagos by Matt Max, features an army of dancers, smoke bombs, and helicopters.

"For Example" was released on March 30, 2013, as the album's seventh single. The accompanying music video for the song was recorded by Matt Max in Mende Village, Lagos. Nigerian singer Durella made a cameo appearance in the video. The album's eighth single, "Why You Love Me", was released on April 21, 2013. The song's music video was directed by Godfather Productions and uploaded to YouTube on December 13, 2013. "Finally" was released on June 20, 2013, as the album's ninth single. Its music video was recorded in London by Sesan and features cameo appearances from Wizkid and the CEO Dancers. The wedding anthem "Obimo (My Heart)" was released on June 22, 2013, as the album's tenth single. Patrick Elis directed the song's music video, which was released on November 20, 2013.

== Critical reception ==
Professional ratings
Review scores
Source	Rating
TayoTV	6.5/10
TooXclusive	3/5 stars
Nigerian Entertainment Today	3.5/5 stars

D'Kings Men received mixed reviews from music critics. Jon Caramanica of The New York Times described the album as "an alluring contemporary pop album with an emphasis on king-size dance music." Reviewing for Nigerian Entertainment Today, Ayomide Tayo granted the album 3.5 stars out of 5, acknowledging its inclusion of "strong pop songs hinged on D'banj's infectious personality and amazing instrumentals." TooXclusive's Ogaga Sakapide gave the album 3 stars out of 5, saying it "dives into the usual subjects of partying, love, wealth, fame and success". Amb Noni of TayoTV rated the album 6.7 out of 10, calling it "average".

== Track listing ==
No.	Title	Writer(s)	Producer(s)	Length
1.	"DKM Intro (Do U Feel)" (D'banj)	Dapo Daniel Oyebanjo	—	1:53
2.	"Cashflow" (D'banj and Kayswitch)	Oyebanjo; Kehinde Oladotun Oyebanjo	Dee Vee	3:20
3.	"Blame It on the Money" (D'banj featuring Big Sean and Snoop Lion)	Oyebanjo; Sean Michael Anderson; Calvin Cordozar Broadus, Jr.	Dee Vee	4:55
4.	"For Example" (Kayswitch)	Oyebanjo	Dee Vee	5:25
5.	"Ibadi E (Bounce)" (D'banj featuring J.Sol, Kayswitch, Durella, and Olamide)	Oyebanjo; Jason Jermaine Lopez; Oyebanjo; Oluwadamilare Okulaja; Olamide Adedeji	Dee Vee	5:48
6.	"Don't Tell Me Nonsense" (D'banj)	Oyebanjo	Dee Vee; Jay Sleek	3:41
7.	"Nous Les Meilleurs (We the Best)" (D'banj featuring Fally Ipupa)	Oyebanjo; Fally Ipupa N'simba	Don Jazzy	3:32
8.	"Oliver Twist" (D'banj)	Oyebanjo	Don Jazzy	3:54
9.	"Obimo (My Heart)" (Kayswitch featuring D'banj)	Oyebanjo	Dee Vee	3:53
10.	"Top of the World" (D'banj)	Oyebanjo	2Kriss	3:40
11.	"Money On My Mind" (Kayswitch featuring J.Sol)	Oyebanjo; Lopez	Dee Vee	3:40
12.	"Scape Goat (The Fix)" (D'banj featuring Kanye West)	Oyebanjo; Kanye Omari West	Don Jazzy	3:43
13.	"Why You Love Me" (D'banj)	Oyebanjo	Dee Vee	3:21
14.	"Bachelor" (D'banj)	Oyebanjo	Jay Sleek	3:59
15.	"Finally" (D'banj)	Oyebanjo	Dee Vee	4:00
16.	"Trance" (D'banj featuring Naeto C)	Oyebanjo; Naetochukwu Chikwe	Jay Sleek	3:29
17.	"Ka Wo Soke (Hands Up)" (D'banj featuring Ikechukwu and Olamide)	Oyebanjo; Ikechukwu Onunaku; Adedeji	Dee Vee	4:15
18.	"Sister Caro" (Kayswitch featuring D'banj)	Oyebanjo; Oyebanjo	Jay Sleek	3:45
19.	"First of All [Remix]" (Olamide featuring D'banj)	Adedeji; Oyebanjo	Dee Vee	2:52
20.	"Show My Logo" (Kayswitch)	Oyebanjo	—	3:29

iTunes bonus tracks
No.	Title	Producer(s)	Length
21.	"Cashflow (ClassyMenace Remix)" (D'banj featuring Kayswitch)	ClassyMenace	3:58
22.	"Oliver Twist (Remix)" (D'banj featuring Pitbull)	Don Jazzy	4:19
23.	"Oliver Twist (ClassyMenace Remix)" (D'banj)	ClassyMenace	3:28
Total length:			88:00

Notes

- "—" denotes an unknown producer

== Personnel ==
- Dapo Daniel Oyebanjo – primary artist
- Kehinde Oladotun Oyebanjo – primary artist
- Jason Lopez – primary artist
- Olamide Adedeji – featured artist
- Oluwadamilare Kulaja – featured artist
- Kanye Omari West – featured artist
- Sean Michael Anderson – featured artist
- Calvin Cordozar Broadus Jr. – featured artist
- Fally Ipupa N'Simba – featured artist
- Ikechukwu Onunaku – featured artist
- Michael Collins Ajereh – producer
- Jay Sleek – producer
- Dee Vee – producer
- Classy Menace – producer

== Release history ==
Region	Date	Format	Label
Nigeria	June 24, 2013	CD, Digital download	DB Records, Sony Music
