= Mr Endowed =

2010 song performed by D'banj

Single by D'banj
- Released: May 23, 2010
- Recorded: 2010
- Genre: Afropop
- Length: 4:16
- Label: Mo' Hits Records
- Songwriter: Dapo Oyebanjo
- Producer: Don Jazzy

D'banj singles chronology
"Critical" (2009)	"Mr Endowed" (2010)	"Scapegoat" (2010)

Music video
- "Mr Endowed" on YouTube

"Mr Endowed" is a song by Nigerian singer D'banj, released on May 23, 2010. Produced by Don Jazzy, it was included in the track listing for Mr. Endowed, an album that was never released due to D'banj's exit from Mo' Hits Records. The song was reportedly recorded after D'banj signed a recording contract with Kanye West's GOOD Music. In an interview with April Woodard of BET, D'banj confirmed the rumours about the aforementioned contract.

== Performance ==
D'banj performed the song at Chris Aire's "Hollywood Jewels" event in April 2010.

== Critical reception ==
"Mr Endowed" was met with positive reviews from music critics. Demola Ogundele of NotJustOk praised Don Jazzy's versatility and further stated, "You can tell that this track is geared to an international audience while still staying true to the Nigerian market content wise." A writer BellaNaija added, "D’banj has always had a way with wordplay and this is no exception. Over a strumming Don Jazzy beat, D’Banj tells us how is 'Mr Endowed'".

== Accolades ==
"Mr Endowed" was nominated for Hottest Single of the Year at the 2011 Nigeria Entertainment Awards. The music video for the song was nominated for Best Afro Pop Video and Video of the Year at the 2010 Nigeria Music Video Awards (NMVA). "Mr Endowed" earned D'banj a nomination for Best Use of Effects at the aforementioned awards ceremony.

== Mr Endowed (Remix) ==
"Mr Endowed (Remix)"

Single by D'banj featuring Snoop Dogg
- Released: February 9, 2011
- Recorded: 2011
- Genre: Afropop; hip hop
- Length: 4:44
- Label: Mo' Hits Records
- Songwriters: Dapo Oyebanjo; Calvin Cordozar Broadus, Jr
- Producer: Don Jazzy

D'banj singles chronology
"Scapegoat" (2010)	"Mr Endowed (Remix)" (2011)	"Oliver Twist" (2011)

Snoop Dogg singles chronology
"Boyfriend" (2011)	"Mr Endowed (Remix)" (2011)	"Last Night" (2011)

Music video
- "Mr Endowed Remix" on YouTube

The remix of "Mr Endowed" features rap vocals by American rapper Snoop Dogg. It was released on May 23, 2010, by Mo' Hits Records. Produced by Don Jazzy, the song appeared in the track listing for Mr. Endowed, an unreleased album.

=== Background ===
Don Jazzy uploaded the remix's cover art onto Twitter in October 2010. There were speculations that D'banj and Snoop Dogg would premiered the song during the 2010 Koko Concert. D'banj and Snoop Dogg performed the song at the 2013 MTV Africa All Stars Concert, which was held at the Moses Mabhida Stadium in Durban, South Africa.

=== Music video ===
The music video for the remix was directed by Sesan Ogunro. It was produced by BAFTA-nominated film producer Luti Fagbenle, who is best known for producing music videos for recording artists such as Flo Rida, Akon, Pitbull, N-Dubz and Alexandra Burke.

=== Accolades ===
The music video for "Mr Endowed" (Remix) won Most Gifted Male Video and was nominated for the Most Gifted Video of the Year at the 2011 Channel O Music Video Awards. It was also nominated for Best Afro Pop Video at the 2011 Nigeria Music Video Awards (NMVA).
