= Oliver Twist (D'banj song) =

2012 single by D'banj

Single by D'banj

from the album King Don Come and D'Kings Men
- Released: 12 August 2011; 11 May 2012 (Release history)
- Recorded: 2011
- Genre: Afrobeats; EDM
- Length: 3:54
- Label: Mo' Hits; Mercury; GOOD
- Songwriters: Dapo Oyebanjo; Michael Ajereh
- Producer: Don Jazzy

D'banj singles chronology
"Mr Endowed (Remix)" (2011)	"Oliver Twist" (2011)	"Sister Caro" (2012)

Music video
- "Oliver Twist" on YouTube

"Oliver Twist" is a song by Nigerian singer-songwriter D'banj. The track was first released on 12 August 2011 in Nigeria by Mo' Hits Records and then released in the United Kingdom by Mercury Records on 11 May 2012, as the first single from the DB Records compilation album, D'Kings Men (2013) and D'banj's fourth studio album King Don Come (2017). For the chart week dated 26 May, "Oliver Twist" debuted at number nine on the UK Singles Chart—marking the musician's first chart appearance and first Nigerian song to ever debut on the chart. Lyrically, the song expresses D'banj's crave for more women, relating to how the fictional character Oliver Twist asked for more gruel. In August 2025, Billboard magazine ranked "Oliver Twist" number 7 on their list of the 50 Best Afrobeats Songs of All Time.

== Background and release ==
"Oliver Twist" was one of the final singles released before the dissolution of Mo' Hits Records. Originally intended as the third single off an unreleased album, the song was first released for free download on the official Mo' Hits Records website on 12 August 2011. Don Jazzy told Toolz that the reason that he made "Oliver Twist" was because he was pressured by the industry to release more music from D'banj. The song's release was supported by an online dance competition, where fans were invited to upload videos of themselves dancing to it on YouTube. Entries were judged on entertainment value and cash prizes were awarded to multiple winners, with the top entries featured in the official music video. Additional incentives included branded mobile phones for selected participants.

To promote the competition, D'banj, Don Jazzy, Wande Coal, and Dr Sid recorded and shared a dance video to the song on 18 August 2011. The competition ended on 15 October 2011. It gained wide attention online, with several Nigerian entertainers sharing their own dance videos. My Backyard Crew, led by video director Gbenga Salu, won the competition and received the $2,500 top prize. Other selected participants received cash prizes, while additional entries were featured in the official music video or awarded branded mobile phones. Another dance competition tied to the song was launched after the dissolution of Mo' Hits Records, announced in May 2012. Participants were asked to upload original dance routines to his official website, incorporating moves from the music video. Finalists were selected based on Facebook engagement, with the winners chosen by D'banj. Prizes included cash awards for solo and group performers, as well as sponsored rewards such as customized trainers and studio experiences in London.

=== NBC ban ===
"Oliver Twist" was reportedly banned from radio and television broadcast by the Nigerian Broadcasting Commission (NBC) shortly after its release. The commission issued a circular instructing stations to stop airing the song due to lewd lyrics, including a line referencing actress Omotola Jalade-Ekeinde. Reports of the ban first emerged on social media after rapper Ruggedman claimed that radio stations had been directed not to play the song, citing information from Cool FM Abuja. Nigerian Entertainment Today later reported that some radio stations confirmed receiving an NBC circular, while others said they had not been formally notified. In response, Don Jazzy played down the reports, stating that the ban reflected the commission’s authority and would not stop the song from being widely heard. The reported restriction on the song was later disputed, as it was a rumoured ban that was never officially confirmed.

== Live performances ==
D'banj has performed the song on multiple occasions. On 23 June 2012, he performed "Oliver Twist" at BBC Radio 1's Hackney Weekend, accompanied by a live band and the CEO Dancers, a London-based female trio. He delivered an acoustic rendition of the song on SB.TV.

== International impact ==
During a club appearance in Johannesburg, American singer Chris Brown was seen dancing to "Oliver Twist" while it played at Club Hush. The song was featured in an international advertising campaign for Malibu Black as part of the brand's Mr Moon campaign. In April 2013, "Oliver Twist" was featured on the American morning talk show Live with Kelly and Michael, where it was listed as the third-best song for working out.

=== Covers and freestyles ===
British singer Estelle released a cover to the song in January 2012, name-dropping Tinie Tempah, Kanye West, and Usher. That same month, British rapper Sneakbo performed a rendition of the song. American rapper Wale performed a freestyle over the song's beat in March 2012. UK-based rock band Ryan and the Rumours covered the song in February. In September 2012, Dominican rapper Sensato remixed the song with American rapper Pitbull titled "La Confesion"; an alternate version featuring just Pitbull was included as one of the bonus tracks off D'banj's compilation album D'Kings Men (2013).

=== Marc Anthony sample ===
In 2024, American singer Marc Anthony sampled "Oliver Twist" in the title track of his album Muevanse without obtaining prior permission or clearing the rights. D'banj stated that he initially admired Anthony for sampling the song, but his legal team intervened due to the commercial nature of the music industry. By mid-2025, D’banj confirmed that his legal representatives had contacted Marc Anthony regarding the unauthorised use. No verified reports indicate that Marc Anthony or his representatives issued a public response.

== Track listing ==
Digital download
No.	Title	Length
1.	"Oliver Twist"	3:54
2.	"Oliver Twist" (Zed Bias Bounce Remix)	4:23
3.	"Oliver Twist" (Sneakbo Remix)	4:01
4.	"Oliver Twist" (Sunship Remix)	3:29
5.	"Oliver Twist" (Ruff Loaderz Remix)	5:44

== Critical reception ==
Robert Copsey of Digital Spy gave the song a positive review, stating:

As such, his first release on these shores is a confident debut. "I have a confession," he admits over a hypnotic, afrobeat-meets-hip-hop riff, before reeling off a list of famous ladies he wouldn't mind getting better acquainted with – including Beyoncé, Rihanna and Nicki Minaj ("her yansh is bigger," after all). Given it's near-impossible to resist the hip-shaking melody and bum-wobbling hooks, we can't imagine he'll have much trouble winning them over.

"Oliver Twist" was ranked #4 on NotjustOk's list of the Top 20 Songs of 2011.

== Music video ==
A still from the music video, depicting D'banj and Kanye West; the latter of whom is one of several to make a cameo.

A music video, directed by Sesan Ogunro, to accompany the release of "Oliver Twist" was first released onto YouTube on 19 March 2012. The video itself runs for a total of three minutes and fifty-five seconds and sees the artist, D'banj, performing the track in an empty studio designed as a run down home. It is performed in the key of G♯ minor throughout the entire song. A member of D'banj's live set (David Vujanic) makes an appearance dressed as Oliver Twist, whilst the CEO Dancers (three female dancers) perform to the track. In August 2013, the music video surpassed 21.5 million views making it the Nigerian song with highest number of views on YouTube at the time. As of September 2020, it has more than 53 million views. The video features cameos from D'banj's GOOD Music label mates Big Sean, Pusha T, GOOD Music producer Hit-Boy and the label's founder Kanye West; whilst Mike Dean, Mannie Fresh, Bricka Bricka, Eddie Kadi, Sneakbo and Keisha Buchanan of Sugababes fame also make cameos.

== Accolades ==
The music video for "Oliver Twist" won Most Gifted Male Video and Most Gifted Video of the Year at the 2012 Channel O Music Video Awards. The song won Song of the Year and was nominated for Best Pop Single at The Headies 2012. D'banj received the Best Male West Africa nomination at the 2012 Kora Awards for Oliver Twist. Furthermore, the song was nominated in the Hottest Single of the Year category at the 2012 Nigeria Entertainment Awards. It was also nominated for World's Best Song and World's Best Video at the 2014 World Music Awards.

Year	Awards ceremony	Award description(s)	Results
2014	World Music Awards	World's Best Song	Nominated
2014	World Music Awards	World's Best Video	Nominated
2012	Channel O Music Video Awards	Most Gifted Male Video	Won
2012	Channel O Music Video Awards	Most Gifted Video of the Year	Won
2012	The Headies	Song of the Year	Won
2012	The Headies	Best Pop Single	Nominated
2012	Kora Awards	Best Male West Africa (for Oliver Twist)	Nominated
2012	Nigeria Entertainment Awards	Hottest Single of the Year	Nominated

== Charts ==
=== Chart performance ===
"Oliver Twist" made its first chart appearance on the chart week dated 26 May 2012—where it debuted at number nine on the UK Singles Chart; as the second highest new entry after The Saturdays "30 Days" (#7). The track also debuted at number two on the UK R&B Chart for the same charting week. "Oliver Twist" spent only one week inside the UK top 10, falling four places to number thirteen on its second charting week—and as of the week dated 20 August has spent thirteen consecutive weeks inside the top 75.

Chart (2012)	Peak position
Belgium (Ultratop 50 Flanders)	10
Belgium (Ultratop 50 Wallonia)	18
Germany (GfK)	66
Ireland (IRMA)	55
Romania (Airplay 100)	1
Scotland Singles (OCC)	12
Slovakia Airplay (ČNS IFPI)	24
UK Hip Hop/R&B (OCC)	2
UK Singles (OCC)	9

=== Year-end charts ===
Chart (2012)	Position
UK Singles (OCC)	108

== Certifications ==
Region	Certification	Certified units/sales
United Kingdom (BPI)	Silver	200,000^{*}
^{*} Sales figures based on certification alone.

== Release history ==
Region	Date	Format	Label
Nigeria	12 August 2011	Digital download	Mo' Hits
United Kingdom	11 May 2012	Digital download	Mercury

== See also ==
- List of UK top 10 singles in 2012
- List of Airplay 100 number ones of the 2010s
