= Olufela Omokeko =

Nigerian multimedia artist

Olufela Omokeko (born as Olalekan Keko) is a Nigerian contemporary multimedia artist who works in performance, installation and photography. Born and based in Iwaya waterfront community in Lagos, Olufela is the artistic director of Slum Makers Art Project (X-MAP) in Makoko, and the co-cultural producer of the annual Iwaya Community Art Festival in Lagos.

== Education and training ==
After completing his secondary education, Omokeko trained in the Communal Re-Imagination programme, an alternative art school pioneered by Aderemi Adegbite’s Vernacular Art-space Laboratory Foundation and sponsored by the Prince Klaus Fund.

== Works and recognition ==
Olufela’s works have been featured during the Iwaya Community Art Festival, and at ART X Lagos among others. In October 2017, Olufela was one of the performance artists who featured in Jelili Atiku’s Red Day performance in the Lagos Biennial, at Ebute Metta, Lagos. In November 2018, Olufela was one of six artists whose work was showcased at an exhibition themed "A Tailor’s Scissors", organised by Goethe-Institut and its artist-in-residence by Leon Hösl.

In March 2021, Omokeko's “Masquerading Plastic” a costume made from plastic was commissioned by Tantdile Xperimental lab as a costume for the Dugbedugbe performance, which draws attention to the problem of plastic waste pollution in Nigerian cities, was enacted intermittently by Omokeko and James Notin at Ogunpa Market in Ibadan. In the same year, Omokeko held a solo installation exhibition in Lagos using perishable vegetables which soon started to rotten to draw attention to serious effects of the disruption of food supplychains across the globe owing to COVID-19 lockdowns. The exhibition, titled “The Son of A Pepper Seller”, explored the challenges of vegetable waste that market-women in Lagos and Nigeria constantly struggled with. The exhibition was critically acclaimed and enjoyed coverage in high-reputed international media platforms such as Reuters, the New York Post, among others.

Olufela's video installation "Masquerading Plastic" was among the works of a broad spectrum of 20 Nigerian artists showcased as part of the "In A Pot of Hot Soup: Art and the Articulation of Politics in Nigeria" exhibition shown in London at SOAS Brunei Gallery in Bournemouth from April till September 2022. Other Nigerian artists platformed in the AHRC-funded exhibition included Bruce Onobrakpeya, Jerry Buhari, Jimoh Ganiyu, Omoregie Osakpolor, Peju Layiwola, among others.

As a sequel to his “Son of A Pepper Seller” project, in early 2023, Olufela began working on an art project exploring age-old Yoruba traditions of food preservation across South-Western Nigeria. In connection with this project, he won a Goethe-Institut grant in May 2023 to create a mobile food museum project called “Jeunsoke”.
