= Kesse (musician) =

Ghanaian musician

Mike Kesse
- Also known as: The Prodigy
- Born: Michael Kesse Frimpong; 29 November 1986 (age 39)
- Origin: Accra, Ghana
- Genres: Afropop, R&B, hiplife
- Occupations: Singer; songwriter
- Instruments: Guitar; vocals
- Years active: 2008–present

Michael Kesse Frimpong (born 29 November 1986), who is better known as Kesse, is a Ghanaian singer and songwriter. He rose to fame after winning the fourth season of TV3's Mentor. He participated in season 2 of Project Fame West Africa and finished first runner-up to Chidinma. Kesse's debut studio album, The Prodigy, was released in 2012. It yielded the singles "The Ugly Truth", "The More I Cry", "Superstar", and "Treat Her Royal" (featuring Sarkodie).

== Early life and musical career ==
Michael Kesse Frimpong was born in 1986 and is the only boy child of his family. Kesse was drawn to music at an early age and was referred to as Mike during his high school days at Nkawkaw. He decided to pursue a professional career in music after participating in Mentor and Project Fame West Africa. Kesse gained prominence after releasing his debut single "Oh Yes", a reggae-dancehall song that earned him the Best Male Vocal of the Year award at the 2012 Ghana Music Awards. He often sings in his native language Twi, and is fluent in English, Ga, and French. He has collaborated with Sarkodie, Okyeame Kwame, Guru, Raquel, Appietus, Efya, Ayigbe Edem and Kwaw Kese.

On 25 May 2013, Kesse performed at the Kwame Nkrumah Circle in Accra. His debut studio album, The Prodigy, was supported by the singles "The Ugly Truth", "The More I Cry", "Superstar", and "Treat Her Royal" (featuring Sarkodie). He released four music videos to support the singles. Kesse received four nominations at the 2013 Ghana Music Awards and was nominated twice in the Best Collaboration of the Year and Hip Life Song of the Year categories.

== Discography ==
Studio albums

- The Prodigy (2012)

Singles

- "Oh Yes"
- "Treat Her Royal" (featuring Sarkodie)
- "Asa Bone"
- "Two Eyes"
- "Kwahu Bipo" (featuring Tinny)
- "Obiba" (featuring Efya)

== Awards ==
=== Ghana Music Awards ===
Year	Nominee / work	Award	Result
2013	"Azonto Fiesta" (with Sakordie and Appietus)	Best Collaboration of the Year	Nominated
2013	"Sika" (Okyeame Kwame)	Best Collaboration of the Year	Nominated
2013	"Azonto Fiest"	Hip Life song of the Year	Nominated
2013	"Treat Her Royal" (featuring Sarkodie)	Hip Life song of the Year	Nominated
2012	"Oh Yes"	Best Male Vocal of the Year	Won
