= CEO Dancers =

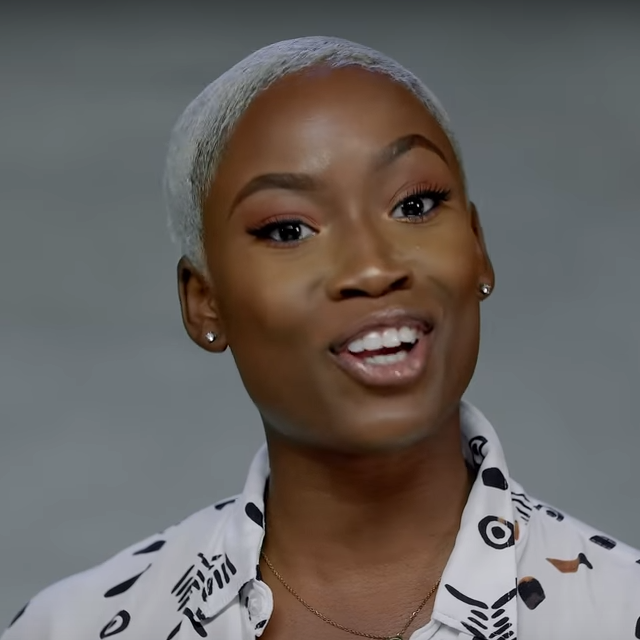
Dancer Soliat Bada appearing on NdaniTV in 2018

The CEO Dancers are a London-based trio of female dancers and choreographers who rose to recognition following their performance at Britain's Got Talent 2013 which achieved acclaim for their "booty-shaking" dance. The performance saw them reach the semi-final of the competition.

== Background ==
Formed during their university days, the group is made up of Ezinne Asinugo, Soliat Bada and Nqobilé Ntshangase. In 2013, the group auditioned for the seventh series of Britain's Got Talent and went on to reach the semi-final following performances that left Simon Cowell impressed, thereby increasing the group's fanbase with Metro's Seamus Duff listing them at #5 on his list of "Britain’s Got Talent’s Top 10 Sexiest Acts". The CEO Dancers have worked with the likes of Rihanna, Drake, Wizkid, Davido, D'Banj, Stefflon Don, Iyanya, Awilo Longomba, Tiwa Savage, P-Square among other notable acts.

== Artistry ==
=== Dance style ===
Their main style of dance originates from Africa. Individually their styles range from Street Dance, Vogueing, Contemporary to Dancehall.

=== Influences ===
The group credit their major inspirations from classic artists like Fela to modern contemporary artists like Fally Ipupa.

== Film appearance ==
In 2016, Ezinne and Soliat made guest appearances in the dance film The Dance Movie Project which premiered on 23 July 2016.

== Awards and nominations ==
Year	Award ceremony	Prize	Result	Ref
2015	2015 African Muzik Magazine Awards	Best Dance Group	Nominated	
2013	5th BEFFTA Awards	Best Dance Group	Won	
