= Scapegoat (song) =

2010 song by D'banj

Single by D'banj
- Released: September 16, 2010
- Recorded: 2010
- Genre: Highlife
- Length: 3:50
- Label: Mo' Hits
- Songwriter: Dapo Oyebanjo
- Producer: Don Jazzy

D'banj singles chronology
"Mr Endowed" (2010)	"Scapegoat" (2010)	"Mr Endowed (Remix)" (2011)

"Scapegoat" is a song by Nigerian singer D'banj, released on September 16, 2010. Produced by Don Jazzy, it was included in the track listing for the unreleased album, Mr. Endowed.

== Critical reception ==
"Scapegoat" was met with positive reviews from music critics. Jibola L of BellaNaija commended the song's highlife elements and said it is "definitely a fun listen". Demola Ogundele of Notjustok said the song "may possibly cut cross the older and younger generation because it is D'banj and it appears that it has some element of a highlife."

== Track listing ==
Digital single

No.	Title	Writer(s)	Producer(s)	Length
1.	"Scapegoat"	Dapo Oyebanjo	Don Jazzy	3:50

== Scape Goat (The Fix) ==
"Scape Goat (The Fix)"

Promotional single by D'banj featuring Kanye West

from the album D'Kings Men
- Released: April 21, 2013
- Recorded: 2013
- Genre: Highlife; hip hop
- Length: 3:43
- Label: DB; Sony
- Songwriters: Dapo Oyebanjo; Kanye West
- Producer: Don Jazzy

The remix of "Scapegoat", titled Scape Goat (The Fix)", features rap vocals from American rapper Kanye West. Released on April 21, 2013, it serves as a promotional single from D'banj's compilation album D'Kings Men (2013). At the Radio 1 Hackney Weekend in London, D'banj first revealed plans to work with West during a backstage interview with Tim Westwood.

=== Critical reception ===
Upon release, the song received mixed reviews from music critics. Jordan Sargent of Spin described the remix as "a delightfully sunny song that nudges up against soca." Carl Williott of Idolator described the remix as "refreshingly carefree and simple", but ended up saying that it "doesn't amount to anything more than a momentary blip on the radar".

=== Track listing ===
Digital single

No.	Title	Writer(s)	Producer(s)	Length
1.	"Scape Goat (The Fix)" (featuring Kanye West)	Dapo Oyebanjo; Kanye Omari West	Don Jazzy	3:43
