= Marvellous Odiete =

Nigerian gospel singer

- Born: September 6, 1978 (age 47); Sapele, Delta State
- Occupations: Gospel singer Songwriter
- Years active: 1978 - Present
- Known for: Gospel music MTN Project Fame Season 5
- Spouse: Joy Odiete

Marvellous Efe Odiete (born 6 September 1978) is a Nigerian gospel singer and songwriter.

== Early life and education ==
Odiete was born on 6 September 1978 in Sapele, Delta State into a Christian family. He was introduced to music in his early years through the influence of his father Bishop John Odiete. He grew up in the church circles and started playing the bass guitar at age 12. He studied political science at the University of Ibadan.

== Career ==
He was first runner up in MTN Project Fame (Season 5). After a long hiatus he released various singles such as "Blow you a kiss", "You are worthy" and "I am not Alone".

== Personal life ==
He married Joy Ilibeno on February 14, 2013.
