= The Guardian (Nigeria) =

Nigerian daily English newspaper

- Type: Daily newspaper
- Format: Broadsheet
- Publisher: Guardian Newspapers Limited
- Founded: 1983
- Language: English
- Headquarters: Lagos
- Website: www.guardian.ng

The Guardian is a Nigerian independent daily newspaper, established in 1983, published by Guardian Newspapers Limited in Lagos, Nigeria.

== History ==
The Guardian was established in 1983 by Alex Ibru, an entrepreneur, and Stanley Macebuh, a top journalist with the Daily Times newspapers, with its model copied from The Guardian in the UK. The paper was first published on 22 February 1983 as a weekly, appearing on Sundays. It started daily publication on 4 July 1983.

During the administration of General Muhammadu Buhari, reporters Tunde Thompson and Nduka Irabor were both sent to jail in 1984 under Decree No. 4 of 1984, which suppressed journalistic freedom. On 26 August 1989 The Guardian published a long letter by Dr. Bekolari Ransome-Kuti, a human-rights activist, entitled "Open Letter to President Babangida", in which he criticized what he saw as increasing government suppression of free expression of ideas.

The owner, Alex Ibru, escaped an assassination attempt during the military regime of General Sani Abacha. On 2 February 1996 his car was fired upon and Ibru was hit. He was rushed to the hospital with one of his eyes dangling from its socket. Following Abacha's sudden death in June 1998, legal proceedings began against his son Mohammed Abacha and his Chief Security Officer Major Hamza al-Mustapha. Eventually, in December 2010 a Lagos High Court acquitted those accused of the attempt.

== Content ==
The Guardian has a national outlook in terms of reach and content. It claims to be independent of any ethnic group, religious community, political party or other interest group. The Guardian is the main competitor to The Punch for advertising, although not for circulation. Unlike The Punch, it focuses on business content rather than on what the editor of The Punch refers to as "appeal to the working classes". The Guardian claims to be read by the most educated section of the elite, while The Punch can be understood by anyone with basic literacy. Other Nigerian papers fall between these extremes. However, The Guardian has often insisted that it caters to the interests of the different segments of the society, ranging from the most educated to the barely literate. The Guardian was described by The New York Times in 1988 as "Nigeria's most respected newspaper".

== Guardian Life Magazine ==
Guardian Life Magazine
- Categories: Lifestyle; Entertainment
- Frequency: Weekly
- Publisher: Guardian Newspapers Limited
- Founded: 2005
- Company: The Guardian
- Country: Nigeria
- Based in: Lagos
- Language: English
- Website: www.guardian.ng/life

Guardian Life Magazine (also known as The Guardian Life or Life Magazine) is a Nigerian lifestyle and entertainment magazine founded by The Guardian, and published by Guardian Newspapers Limited since 2005. The first issue of the magazine was published as a column in The Guardian newspaper weekly on Sundays, till 2013, when the magazine published its first solo issue. In 2013, Tabia Princewill took over as Editor-in-chief. Under her leadership, the magazine was revamped as Life Magazine and published its first print issue.

In 2019, Njideka Agbo became Editor-in-chief till 2022.

=== Issues ===
The magazine has covered the following Nigerian celebrities:

- Ego Boyo,
- Runtown,
- Waje
- Chris Ubosi, NATIVE Sound System,
- Taaooma
- DatWarriGirl
- Adetola Nola, *Mikel John Obi,
- Sola Sobowale
- Odunlade Adekola
- Mike Afolarin
- Genoveva Umeh,
- Burna Boy,
- Chude Jideonwo,
- Phyno,
- Efe,
- Denrele Edun
- Mary Njoku
- CKay
- Mo Abudu
- Kanayo O. Kanayo
- Adesua Etomi
- Bimbo Ademoye
- Chioma Akpotha
- Iyabo Ojo
- Jadesola Osiberu
- Funmi Iyanda
- Nse Ikpe-Etim
- Ayobami Adebayo
- Sambasa Nzeribe
- Nancy Isime
- Femi Bakre
- DJ Obi
- Yemi Alade
- Fade Ogunro
- DJ Cuppy
- Stephanie Coker
- Yagazie Emezi
- Ronke Bamisedun,
- Chike
- Sharon Ooja
- Adenike Adegboye,
- Tiwa Savage
- Davido.
