= Top of the World (D'banj song) =

Single by D'banj

from the album D'Kings Men
- Released: December 13, 2012
- Recorded: 2012
- Genre: Afropop
- Length: 3:40
- Label: DB; Sony
- Producer: 2Kriss

D'Kings Men singles chronology
"Bachelor" (2012)	"Top of the World" (2012)	"Cashflow" (2013)

Music video
- "Top of the World" on YouTube

"Top of the World" is a song by Nigerian singer D'banj. It serves as the fifth single from the compilation album, D'Kings Men (2013). The song is D'banj's first single released on DB Records and RCA Africa since he inked a multi-album agreement with SME Africa. "Top of the World" was the official SuperSport anthem for the 2013 Africa Cup of Nations. It peaked at number four on Afribiz's Top 100 music chart and reached number ten on Pulse Nigeria's Music Video chart.

== Music video ==
The music video for "Top of the World" was filmed by Godfather Productions and highlights the Super Eagles' tournament run at the 2013 Africa Cup of Nations. It also features clips of D'banj's performance at the tournament's closing ceremony, which took place at the FNB Stadium in Johannesburg. Moreover, the video contains scenes of D'banj singing into several microphones and performing with a dreadlocked guitarist and rock drummer. After a 19-year wait, the Super Eagles won the competition, and D'banj dedicated both the song and music video to them.

== Critical reception ==
"Top of the World" received positive reviews from music critics. Charles Mgbolu of Vanguard said the song is "from the soul" and "tells a dramatic story". BellaNaija commended D'banj for being "a force of nature in the African music scene". While praising D'banj's vocal abilities, Monty Entertainment noted that the song is not the same as the ones he released when he was contracted to Mo' Hits Records.
