= Fela =

Fela is a diminutive of Olufela used as a nickname. People with the name include:

- Fela Kuti (Fela Aníkúlápó Kútì, Olufela Olusegun Oludotun Ransome-Kuti, 1938–1997), Nigerian musician and political activist
- Fela Durotoye (Adetokunbo Olufela Durotoye, born 1971), Nigerian business consultant and politician
- Fela Sowande (Olufela Obafunmilayo Sowande, 1905–1987), Nigerian musician and composer
