= Sesan (video director) =

Nigerian cinematographer (b. 1983)

Sesan Ogunro
- Born: Lagos, Nigeria
- Education: University of West London
- Occupation: Cinematographer
- Years active: 2005–present
- Website: directedbysesan.com

Sesan Ogunro Jr. (born 11 January 1983) is a Nigerian music video director based in the United Kingdom, often credited for his work as Sesan. He has directed music videos for Afrobeats genre artists such as D'Banj, Wizkid, Tiwa Savage and Davido. He is the CEO of Film Factory Nigeria, a video production company in Lagos; and Film Factory South Africa, in Johannesburg.

== Early life ==
Sesan spent his early childhood in his birthplace Lagos, Nigeria before moving to the UK with his family, where he attended secondary school in London.

He graduated with a degree in 3D Animation and Visual effects from the University of West London.

Sesan was inspired by his late father and namesake Sesan Ogunro Sr., who ran Eminent Communications, one of the largest advertising agencies in Lagos until his death in 2013.

== Career ==
After university, Sesan pursued film projects in the UK urban underground scene through his co-owned production company, Mastermind Promotions which paved the way for him to branch into the mainstream arena. In 2005 he took on the role as the Head of Post Production with global advertising agency, McCann Erickson, London.

In 2007, he met Afrobeats/Afropop artist D'Banj in a nightclub in Lagos and agreed to film the video for his upcoming single, "Suddenly". Filmed in Lagos, Sesan's Afrobeat directorial debut lead to future award-winning collaborations with D’Banj. These would include the music video for "Oliver Twist", which premiered on YouTube in 2012.

The song was nominated for the World Music Award Best Video of the Year and a Channel O Music Video Awards Most Gifted Video of the Year award in 2012.

Sesan continues to work with artists in all genres such as Grammy nominated duo Riton and Kah-Lo, and has been acclaimed as one of Nigeria's most respected directors.

== Selected videography ==
- Davido Feat. Uhuru and DJ Buckz – The Sound
- Davido Feat. Meek Mill - Fans Mi
- Davido Feat. Nasty C - Coolest Kid in Africa
- Davido Feat. Rae Sremmurd and Young Thug - Pere
- D'Banj Feat. Kanye West – Oliver Twist (D'banj song)
- D'Banj Feat. Snoop Dogg – Mr Endowed
- D'Banj Feat. Tiwa Savage – Shake It
- Digital Farm Animals Feat. Nelly – Millionaire
- Kahlo Feat. Riton – Ginger
- Mr Eazi - In the morning
- Patoranking Feat. Elephant Man and Konshens – Daniella Whine
- Shatta Wale – Gringo
- Wizkid – Final (Baba Nla)
- Wizkid – Soweto Baby
- Wizkid - Tonight
- Wizkid Feat. Mystro – Immediately
- Aṣa – Good Thing
- Tulisa - Daddy

== Awards ==
Year	Project	Ceremony	Category	Result
2011	D'Banj ft Snoop Dogg, "Mr Endowed"	Channel O Music Video Awards	Most Gifted Male Video	Won
2012	D'Banj ft Kanye West, "Oliver Twist (D'banj song)"	Channel O Music Video Awards	Most Gifted Male Video	Won
2012	D'Banj ft Kanye West, "Oliver Twist (D'banj song)"	Channel O Music Video Awards	Video of the Year	Won
2012	D'Banj ft Kanye West, "Oliver Twist (D'banj song)"	World Music Awards	Best Music Video	Nominated
2015	Davido, "The Sound"	MTV Africa Music Awards	Best Video	Nominated
2016	Wizkid ft Uhuru, "Soweto Baby"	MTV Africa Music Awards	Best Collaboration Video	Won
2018	Shatta Wale, "Gringo"	All Africa Music Awards (AFRIMA)	Best Music Video of the Year	Won

== Personal life ==
Sesan is brother to OAP and producer Fade Ogunro and they run production company, Film Factory together.
