= Chopstix production discography =

- Studio albums: 23
- Internet albums: 3
- EPs: 5
- Singles: 78
- Soundtracks: 1

The following list is a discography of production by Chopstix, a Nigerian record producer.

== Singles produced ==
Artist	Title	Year	Album	Release date
Ice Prince	"More"	2012	Fire of Zamani	28 August 2012
Ice Prince	"Aboki"	2012	Fire of Zamani	28 August 2012
Endia	"48"	2012	Non-album single	16 September 2012
Tonii	"Making Money"	2012	Non-album single	30 July 2012
Kahli Abdu	"Morphine (Go Away)"	2012	Non-album single	2 November 2012
Ice Prince	"Aboki (remix)" (feat. Khuli Chana, Mercy Johnson, Wizkid, M.I Abaga & Sarkodie)	2013	Non-album single	23 April 2013
Grip Muzik	"Bad Bad Bad" (feat. J. Mavrik)	2013	Non-album single	31 January 2013
DJ Jimmy Jatt	"Cool As Ice" (feat. Ice Prince & Iceberg Slim)	2013	Non-album single	13 February 2013
Reminisce	"Government"	2013	Alaga Ibile	4 March 2013
Victoria Kimani	"M'Toto"	2013	Non-album single	20 February 2013
Victoria Kimani	"Girlz"	2013	Queen Victoria	30 September 2013
Ice Prince	"Gimme Dat" (feat. Burna Boy, Yung L & M.I Abaga)	2013	Fire of Zamani	24 April 2013
Ice Prince	"V.I.P"	2013	Fire of Zamani	29 April 2013
Ice Prince	"I Swear" (feat. French Montana)	2013	Fire of Zamani	9 September 2013
Yung L	"S.O.S"	2013	Yes Indeed	24 July 2013
Yung L	"Red Rose (remix)" (feat. M.I Abaga & Jesse Jagz)	2013	Non-album single	16 July 2013
J Milla	"Pose"	2013	Non-album single	30 May 2013
Ice Prince	"Shots on Shots" (feat. Sarkodie)	2014	Non-album single	11 April 2014
Ice Prince	"N Word [Remix]" (feat. AKA)	2014	Non-album single	6 August 2014
Burna Boy, Endia, Yung L, Eva Alordiah & Sarkodie	"Shuga"	2014	Non-album single	16 February 2014
Endia	"Me And My Guyz"	2014	Non-album single	11 September 2014
Mo'Cheddah	"My Time"	2014	Non-album single	9 July 2014
Victoria Kimani	"Oya" (feat. M.I Abaga)	2014	Non-album single	14 February 2014
Yung L	"Designer"	2014	Non-album single	13 March 2014
Yung L	"Shooga"	2014	Non-album single	25 November 2014
Eva Alordiah	"Shuga"	2014	Non-album single	13 March 2014
Burna Boy	"Rockstar"	2015	Non-album single	17 January 2015
Jesse Jagz	"Jaga Love" (feat. Ice Prince)	2015	Non-album single	27 November 2015
Chopstix	"Banging" (feat. Ceeza Milli, CDQ, & Reminisce)	2015	Non-album single	12 October 2015
DJ Lambo	"The Motion" (feat. Seyi Shay, Cynthia Morgan & Eva Alordiah)	2015	Non-album single	28 July 2015
Endia	"Dutty Panty"	2015	Non-album single	3 July 2015
Yung L	"Brand New"	2016	Non-album single	11 January 2016
Yung L	"High Life"	2016	Non-album single	22 April 2016
Yung L	"Pass the Aux"	2016	Non-album single	10 June 2016
Yung L	"Banger"	2016	Non-album single	26 August 2016
AC	"Anyhow" (feat. Chopstix)	2016	Non-album single	20 July 2016
Chopstix	"Woman" (feat. Yung L & Burna Boy)	2016	Non-album single	1 December 2016
Yung L	"Pop Up"	2017	Non-album single	28 March 2017
Major Lazer	"Run Up (Afrosmash Remix)" (feat. PartyNextDoor, Nicki Minaj, Yung L, Skales & Chopstix)	2017	Non-album single	12 May 2017
Navy Kenzo	"Done" (feat. Mr Eazi)	2017	AIM (Above Inna Minute)	20 January 2017
Skales	"Agolo"	2017	Non-album single	6 October 2017
Chopstix	"Intanashona Baby" (feat. Yung L, Endia & Timaya])	2017	Non-album single	12 July 2017
Chopstix & Save Milli	"Intanashona Baby"	2017	Non-album single	12 August 2017
Otee	"Runaway"	2017	Non-album single	17 November 2017
Loose Kaynon	"5 Alive" (feat. TMXO & Yung L)	2017	Non-album single	30 August 2017
Endia	"Tender" (feat. Moelogo)	2017	Peace Of Mind	29 August 2017
Harry Brimstone	"Roll Dat"	2017	Non-album single	30 May 2017
Nissi	"Familiar"	2017	Non-album single	15 September 2017
Chopstix	"Senrere" (feat. Skales & D'Banj)	2018	Non-album single	20 February 2018
Endia	"That’s Me"	2018	Non-album single	5 March 2018
D’Banj	Agidi"	2018	Non-album single	1 June 2018
Skales	"Pass" (feat. Yung L & Endia)	2018	Mr Love	9 May 2018
Skales	"O'Crazy"	2018	Non-album single	5 March 2018
Skales	"Fire Waist" (feat. Harmonize)	2018	Mr Love	13 July 2018
Mr Eazi	"London Town" (feat. Giggs)	2018	Life Is Eazi, Vol. 2 – Lagos to London	23 May 2018
Click Stuart & DJ Roja	"Pon Mi (remix)" (feat. Beenie Gunter & Skales)	2018	Non-album single	2 February 2018
Skales	"Ego"	2019	Afro Dance	7 June 2019
CDQ & Skales	"Head 2 Toe"	2019	Afro Dance	3 March 2019
Yung L	"Get Up" (feat. Reekado Banks)	2019	Jollification	5 April 2019
Magnito	"Relationship Be Like"	2019	Non-album single	18 March 2019
Chopstix	"Sample" (feat. Yung L)	2019	Non-album single	12 Jul 2019
Chopstix	"Te Amo" (feat. Jody)	2019	Non-album single	6 March 2019
Mugeez	"Six In Da Morning"	2020	Non-album single	8 May 2020
Cynthia Morgan	"Hustle"	2020	Non-album single	21 August 2020
Baby A	"Pampila"	2020	Non-album single	22 May 2020
Yung L	"Operator"	2020	Yaadman Kingsize	4 December 2020
Yung L	"Tropicana Baby"	2020	Juice & Zimm	10 January 2020
Yung L	"Eve Bounce (remix)" (feat. Wizkid)	2020	Non-album single	22 May 2020
M.I Abaga	"TBDK" (feat. Sinzu & Erigga)	2021	Non-album single	19 March 2021
Krisirie	"Heaven"	2021	Non-album single	21 January 2021
Burna Boy	"Kilometre"	2021	Love, Damini	30 April 2021
Burna Boy	"Last Last"	2022	Love, Damini	13 May 2022
M.I Abaga	"The Guy"	2022	The Guy	22 July 2022
April Maey	"Far Away"	2022	Non-album single	16 September 2022
BLNDE	"S.B.B."	2023	Non-album single	1 April 2023
Dotstar	"Wanbi"	2023	Non-album single	2 March 2023
Chris Brown	"Nightmares" (feat. Byron Messia)	2023	11:11	7 November 2023
MOS€S, M.I.K, & JL SA	"19:42"	2024	TBA	3 May 2024

== Studio albums produced ==
Artist	Album	Release date	Certifications	Label
Ice Prince	Everybody Loves Ice Prince	9 October 2011		Chocolate City
Ice Prince	Fire of Zamani	28 October 2013		Chocolate City
Reminisce	Alaga Ibile	15 November 2013		Edge / LRR
Phyno	No Guts No Glory	20 March 2014		Sputnet Records / Penthauze
Reminisce	Baba Hafusa	30 April 2015		Edge / LRR
Ice Prince	Jos to the World	28 October 2016		Super Cool Cats
Navy Kenzo	AIM (Above Inna Minute)	20 January 2017		The Industry Studio
Yung L	Better Late Than Never (BLTN)	13 October 2017		Chocolate City
M.I Abaga	A Study on Self Worth: Yxng Dxnzl	24 August 2018		Chocolate City
Burna Boy	Outside	26 January 2018		Spaceship / Bad Habit / Atlantic
Skales	Mr Love	19July 2018		OHK Entertainment
Burna Boy	African Giant	26 July 2019	MC: Gold; NVPI: Gold; IFPI: Gold; BPI : Gold; SNEP : Gold	Spaceship / Atlantic / WMG
Seyi Shay	Summer Vibe	13 March 2019		Star Gurl
Endia	Peace Of Mind	29 November 2019		Uptimum Music
Yung L	Juice & Zimm	17 January 2020	Zimmlife	
Skales	Afro Dance	15 February 2020		OHK Entertainment
Yung L	Yaadman Kingsize	29 January 2021		Zimmlife
IRIE SESSIONS	BORDERS	6 May 2022		IRIE GLOBAL LLC.
Burna Boy	Love, Damini	8 July 2022	MC : Gold; NVPI : Gold; IFPI Danmark : Platinum; BPI : Gold; SNEP : Gold; NVPI : Gold; GLF : Gold; TCSN : 5× Platinum	Bad Habit / Spaceship / Atlantic
WSTRN	WSTRN Season 3	8 September 2022		EMPIRE
M.I Abaga	The Guy	19 August 2022		Incredible Music / Chocolate City
Blaqbonez	Young Preacher	28 October 2022		Chocolate City
Chris Brown	11:11	10 November 2023	IFPI Danmark : Gold; RMNZ : Platinum; BPI : Silver	RCA / CBE
Chopstix and Yaadman fka Yung L	OXYTOCIN	30 May 2025		Summertime Music, and Zimmlife

== Mixtapes produced ==
Artist	Mixtape	Release date	Certifications	Label
Victoria Kimani	Queen Victoria	14 October 2013		Chocolate City
M.I Abaga	Rendezvous	9 February 2018		Chocolate City
Mr Eazi	Life Is Eazi, Vol. 2 – Lagos to London	9 November 2018		Banku Music / Universal Music Africa

== Extended plays produced ==
Artist	Extended play (EP)	Release date	Certifications	Label
Lil Miss Miss	The Lil Miss Miss EP	5 May 2013		Boss Miss Empire
Harmonize	Afro Bongo	25 February 2019		Ziiki Media
Yung L	Jollification	19 April 2019		ZIMMLIFE
Nissi	Ignite	31 July 2020		Spaceship
Yung L	Yes Indeed	18 August 2023		Zimmlife
Ice Prince	Starters	6 June 2025		Super Cool Cat

== Soundtrack produced ==
Artist	Soundtrack	Release date	Certifications	Label
M.I Abaga	African Knockout Soundtrack	23 October 2020		AKO
