= The Chairman (M.I album) =

Studio album by M.I
- Released: October 30, 2014
- Recorded: 2012–2014
- Genre: Hip-hop
- Length: 75:00
- Label: Chocolate City; Loopy Music
- Producer: Jude Abaga; Reinhard; Sarz; Pheelz; Sammy Gyang; G-Plus; L-37; VSTOL; Frank Edwards

M.I chronology
Illegal Music 2 (2012)	The Chairman (2014)	The Indestructible Choc Boi Nation (2015)

Singles from The Chairman
- 1. "Bad Belle" Released: December 4, 2014; 2. "Monkey" Released: March 26, 2015; 3. "Bullion Van" Released: August 26, 2015

The Chairman is the third studio album by Nigerian rapper and record producer M.I. It was released on October 30, 2014, by Chocolate City and Loopy Music. The album features collaborations with producers and guest artists such as 2face Idibia, Wizkid, Reinhard, Sarz, and Ice Prince, among others. The Chairman was supported by the singles "Bad Belle", "Monkey" and "Bullion Van". It won Best Rap Album and was nominated for Album of the Year at The Headies 2015.

== Background and promotion ==
M.I spent two years recording The Chairman, and describes it as a collaborative project due to the number of music personnel who contributed to it. The Chairman features collaborations with producers and guest artists such as 2face Idibia, Wizkid, Seyi Shay, Ice Prince, Olamide, Phyno, Reminisce, Oritse Femi, Patoranking, Reinhard, Runtown, Sarkodie, Nosa, Beenie Man, Koker, Moti Cakes, Wilson Alao, Sound Sultan, Emmy Ace, Sammy Gyang, Chigul, Milli, Frank Edwards, Nanya, G-Plus, Morell, Loose Kaynon, Pheelz, Debbie, DJ Lambo, Sarz, Stormrex, L-37, VSTOL, and I.J. Its production began in 2012 and continued through the third quarter of 2014. M.I worked with several collaborators while enlisting new producers. Much of The Chairman tells the story of the rapper's journey into limelight. According to M.I's team, the album sold 30,000 copies in pre-order sales.

The Chairman was initially slated for release in June 2013, but was postponed due to the rapper partaking in other business ventures. In an interview with Sunrise Daily in 2014, M.I said Jesse Jagz's departure from Chocolate City also delayed the album. In another interview with Leadership newspaper, he said he was inspired to name the album The Chairman after hearing people address him as such. The album comprises seventeen tracks and every track, excluding "The Middle", has an opposite. On October 22, 2014, the album was made available for pre order. Seven days later, its official cover art and track list were released. M.I held a listening party for the album at an Industry Nite event on the same day. He performed with Jesse Jagz and dedicated the track "Brother" to him.

=== Singles ===
The Chairman was supported by two promotional singles. The first promotional single, "Chairman", was released on March 19, 2013. Jointly produced by E.Kelly, Chopstix and M.I, the song was initially announced as the album's lead single. "Chairman" was launched via a Google Plus hangout, which was live-streamed on Google Plus and YouTube. The accompanying music video for "Chairman" was filmed in Los Angeles and uploaded to YouTube on May 13, 2013. According to the website Saturday Beats, M.I spent ₦10 million on the video shoot. The second promotional single, "King James", was released on August 21, 2014. M.I describes the song as a non-profit project designed to create awareness and inspire social change. "King James" received generally mixed reviews from music critics.

"Bad Belle" was released as the album's lead single on December 4, 2014. Its music video was directed by Mex and features cameo appearances from Basketmouth, Mode 9, Sound Sultan, Yung6ix and Show Dem Camp, among others. The album's second single, "Monkey", was released on March 26, 2015. The video for the song was self-directed by M.I. "Bullion Van" was released as the album's third single. Its official music video was directed by Mex, and received a nomination for Best Afro Hip Hop Video at the 2015 Nigerian Music Video Awards. Kemi Adetiba recorded an unreleased music video for the song at Koga Studios.

== Composition ==
The Chairman encompasses several layers of M.I's autobiography. On the album's opener "The Beginning/Nobody", M.I plays the role of a crazy teacher with his voice. In the Chigul-assisted track "Monkey", he raps with a gospel flow over a highlife instrumental. In "Human Being", he reminds listeners that celebrity is not all its hyped up to be. In "Rich", M.I narrates his grass to grace story and in "Brother", he enlists Nosa to help him depict the cracks at Chocolate City. "Shekpe" is a song that celebrates street life and low-cost highs. In "Enemies", M.I and Patoranking tell listeners that the world of celebrity is a land filled with haters. "Yours" is an ode to his core fans who supported him from day one. On the album's closing track, "The End/The Chairman", M.I tells listeners that the real chairman is God.

== Critical reception ==
Professional ratings
Review scores
Source	Rating
Lobatan	A
The Breaking Times	7/10
NotJustOk	6.5/10
Pulse Nigeria	4/5 stars
Nigerian Entertainment Today	4/5 stars
TooXclusive	2.5/5 stars

The Chairman received generally positive reviews from music critics. Toni Kan of Thisday newspaper called the album a "chockfull of hits" and characterized it as an "autobiography and memoir, manual and manifesto, pure fiction and drama, as well as poetry on an epic scale." Lobatan's Oscar Okeke gave the album an A rating, noting it "sounds like the result of an extended period of anxiety, overweighing thoughts, pressure, and other deep seated emotions that can only manifest through music." Writing for Pulse Nigeria, Ayomide Tayo awarded the album 4 stars out of 5, calling it "an inspiring, entertaining and a brilliant body of work from a master who has regained his magical touch."

Dayo Showemimo of Nigerian Entertainment Today granted the album 4 stars out of 5, describing it as "legendary" and commending its production and technical detail. The Breaking Times rated the album 7 out of 10, saying he "hasn't lost much (in terms of song crafting and ear for beats), and therefore, has nothing to prove to naysayers". Reviewing for NotJustOk, Tola Sarumi rated the record 6.5 out of 10, concluding it has something for everyone. YNaija's Wilfred Okiche believes the album's defining experience came from its subtle songs. Henry Igwe, another YNaija contributor, said the lyrics and production on "Human Being" are nonpareil, when compared to "Shekpe" or "Bullion Van".

In a less enthusiastic review, Jim Donnett of TooXclusive gave the album 2.5 stars out of 5, criticizing M.I's solo abilities and decision to feature 26 artists. The Chairman won Best Rap Album and was nominated for Album of the Year at The Headies 2015.

== Track listing ==
The Chairman
No.	Title	Writer(s)	Producer(s)	Length
1.	"The Beginning/Nobody"	Jude Abaga	Abaga	3:13
2.	"Monkey" (featuring Chigul)	Abaga	Abaga; Reinhard^{[a]}; L37^{[a]}	4:13
3.	"Rich" (featuring Koker)	Abaga; Koker; L37	Sarz; L37^{[a]}; Sammy Gyang^{[a]}; Abaga^{[a]}	3:34
4.	"Mine" (featuring Wizkid)	Abaga; Ayodeji Balogun; Ugo	Abaga; L37^{[a]}; Reinhard^{[a]}	3:57
5.	"Shekpe" (featuring Reminisce)	Abaga; Remilekun Safaru	Sarz; Abaga^{[b]}; Reinhard^{[b]}	3:48
6.	"Bad Belle" (featuring Moti Cakes)	Abaga; Motolani Awokoya	Reinhard	3:12
7.	"Wheel Barrow" (featuring Emmy Ace and Beenie Man)	Abaga; Anthony Davis	Sarz; MI Abaga^{[a]}; L37^{[a]}; Reinhard^{[a]}	4:45
8.	"Brother" (featuring Nosa and Milli)	Abaga; Nosa Omoregie; Milli Nasir; Erica	Reinhard; L37^{[b]}	3:54
9.	"The Middle" (featuring Olamide and I.J)	Abaga; Olamide Adedeji; L37; Will	Abaga; L37^{[a]}; Reinhard^{[a]}	4:10
10.	"Enemies" (featuring Patoranking)	Abaga; Patrick Okorie	MI Abaga; L37^{[a]}	5:15
11.	"Bullion Van" (featuring Phyno, Runtown and Stormrex)	Abaga; Azubuike Nelson; Douglas Jack-Agu; L37; Stormrex	L37	4:35
12.	"Always Love" (featuring Seyi Shay)	Abaga; Deborah Joshua	Abaga; L37^{[a]}; Reinhard^{[a]}	4:28
13.	"Millionaira Champagne" (featuring Ice Prince, Sarkodie and DJ Lambo)	Abaga; Michael Addo; Panshak Zamani	Abaga; L37^{[a]}; Reinhard^{[a]}	5:57
14.	"Yours" (featuring Milli and Debbie)	Abaga; Nasir	L37	5:23
15.	"Beg" (featuring Morell and Loose Kaynon)	Abaga; Morell; Loose Kaynon	Abaga; Reinhard^{[b]}	3:50
16.	"Human Being" (featuring 2face Idibia and Sound Sultan)	Abaga; Innocent Idibia; Sound Sultan	Pheelz; Abaga^{[a]}	5:49
17.	"The End/The Chairman" (featuring Oritse Femi, Frank Edwards and Nanya)	Abaga; Tosin Martins; Oritsefemi Ekele; Frank Edwards	Abaga; VSTOL^{[a]}; Frank Edwards^{[a]}	5:57
Total length:				75:00

Notes

- ^{^[a]} signifies a co-producer
- ^{^[b]} signifies an additional producer
- "Monkey" and "Bad Belle" contain additional vocals by Milli
- The skit performed on "Enemies" was done by Erica
- "Bullion Van" contains additional vocals by L37 and T-Soul
- "Millionaira Champagne" contains additional vocals by Reinhard
- "The End/The Chairman" contains additional vocals by Jade Abaga

== Personnel ==
Credits adapted from M.I's website.

- Jude Abaga – primary artist, executive producer, production, writing, mixing
- Yahaya Maikori – executive producer
- Audu Maikori – executive producer
- Paul Okeugo – executive producer
- Innocent Idibia – performer
- Ayodeji Balogun – performer
- Deborah Joshua – performer
- Panshak Zamani – performer
- Olamide Adedeji – performer
- Azubuike Nelson – performer
- Remilekun Safaru – performer
- Oritsefemi Ekele – performer
- Patrick Okorie – performer
- Douglas Jack-Agu – performer
- Michael Addo – performer
- Nosa Omoregie – performer
- Anthony Davis – performer
- Sound Sultan – performer
- Koker – performer
- Moti Cakes – performer
- Morell – performer
- Loose Kaynon – performer
- Debbie – performer
- Stormrex – performer
- Ugo – performer
- Milli – additional vocals, performer
- Frank Edwards – performer, production
- I.J – performer
- Nanya – performer
- Chioma Omeruah – performer
- Emmy Ace – performer
- Jumar – performer
- DJ Lambo – performer
- Jade Abaga – additional vocals
- T-Soul – additional vocals
- Reinhard – production, additional production, additional vocals
- Sarz – production
- Pheelz – production
- Sammy Gyang – production, additional production
- L-37 – production, additional production, additional vocals, mixing
- VSTOL – production
- G-Plus – production, mixing
- Wilson Alao – mixing
- Erica – skit performer
- August Udoh – photography
- Blackchild – album design
- Tunde Ahmed – album design

== Release history ==
Region	Date	Version	Format	Label
Various	October 30, 2014	Standard	CD; digital download	Chocolate City; Loopy Music
