= Jos to the World =

Studio album by Ice Prince
- Released: October 28, 2016
- Recorded: 2015–2016
- Genre: Hip-hop; R&B; afrobeats; dancehall; ragga; soul; highlife
- Length: 77:59
- Label: Super Cool Cats
- Producer: Ice Prince (exec.); Tobi Sanni-Daniel (exec.); Chopstix (exec.); Tone P (exec.); Every Play Counts (exec.)

Ice Prince chronology
The Indestructible Choc Boi Nation (2015)	Jos to the World (2016)	C.O.L.D (2018)

Jos to the World is the third studio album by Nigerian rapper Ice Prince. It was released on 28 October 2016, under his independent record label Super Cool Cats, following his exit from Chocolate City. The album features guest appearances from Yung L, Krept and Konan, Phyno, Dice Ailes, Koker, DJ Buckz, the Fresh Brit, Ava Hovanka, Timaya, Runtown, Tiwa Savage, Vanessa Mdee, Yemi Alade, Phil Ade, Tone P, Sojay, and Bre-Z.

== Track listing ==
No.	Title	Writer(s)	Producer(s)	Length
1.	"Me Vs. Me"	Panshak Zamani	Illkeyz	4:23
2.	"Looking At You"	Zamani	The Fresh Brit; DB Bantino	4:15
3.	"Playlist" (featuring Yung L)	Zamani; Christopher Omenye	Chopstix	4:33
4.	"Want It All" (featuring Krept and Konan)	Zamani; Casyo Johnson; Karl Wilson	Illkeyz	4:05
5.	"2AM In Chevron" (Interlude)	Zamani	Illkeyz; Ghost88	3:39
6.	"Trillions" (featuring Phyno)	Zamani; Chibuzor Azubuike	T.U.C	3:20
7.	"Brooklyn" (featuring Dice Ailes)	Zamani; Shasha Alesh	Chopstix	3:48
8.	"Stand Out" (featuring Bre-Z)	Zamani; Calesha Murray	Chopstix	2:37
9.	"Hello" (featuring Ava Hovanka, The Fresh Brit)	Zamani; Ava Hovanka; The Fresh Brit	The Fresh Brit	6:08
10.	"Day 1" (featuring Koker)	Zamani; Olayiwola Kokumo	CKay; Mr. Kamera	3:51
11.	"Boss"	Zamani; Augustine Kelechi	Tekno	3:06
12.	"Excellency" (featuring DJ Buckz)	Zamani; Obakeng Ramahali	Illkeyz	3:49
13.	"Belinda" (featuring Timaya)	Zamani; Inetimi Odon	Popito	3:27
14.	"For Yah" (featuring Runtown)	Zamani; Douglas Jack-Agu	Chopstix	4:15
15.	"No Be Today" (featuring Tiwa Savage)	Zamani; Tiwatope Savage	Illkeyz	3:35
16.	"No Mind Dem" (featuring Vanessa Mdee)	Zamani; Vanessa Mdee	Mr. Kamera	4:19
17.	"Run With You" (featuring Yemi Alade)	Zamani; Yemi Alade	Chopstix	3:50
18.	"Rich" (featuring Phil Ade, Sojay, and Tone P)	Zamani; Phil Ade; Samuel Okorie Jr.; Ernest Price	Illkeyz; Tone P	2:27
19.	"Show Me/Deep Inside" (bonus track)	Zamani	Gyang	7:52
Total length:				77:59
