= The Guy (album) =

Studio album by M.I Abaga
- Released: 19 August 2022
- Genre: Afrobeats; hip-hop; afropop; soul; highlife
- Length: 40:25
- Label: Incredible Music; Chocolate City
- Producer: M.I Abaga; G-Plus; Geek Beats; Chopstix; BeatsByJayy; Tempoe; Masterkraft; Chillz; Jesse Jagz

M.I Abaga chronology
Judah (2020)	The Guy (2022)

Singles from The Guy
- 1. "Daddy" Released: 25 March 2022; 2. "The Guy" Released: 22 July 2022

The Guy is the fifth studio album by Nigerian rapper M.I Abaga. Released on 19 August 2022 by Incredible Music and Chocolate City Music, the album features guest appearances from Nas, Olamide, Duncan Mighty, Phyno, Cavemen, Wande Coal, Bnxn, Temi Owo, Lord Vino, Ossi Grace, Chillz, Ice Prince, and Jesse Jagz.

== Background ==
M.I first hinted at plans toward a new album via his social media, where he announced that he would consider changing his stage name after performing under it for fifteen years. He stated that he would change his name to "The Guy" and release an album of the same name. M.I cited that the reason for the name change was because his album was going to be "hard AF and it deserves a new name." He announced the release date of the album a month before its release, on 19 July 2022, and revealed the tracklist to the album on 15 August 2022 with an accompanying album trailer.

== Singles ==
The album was preceded by two singles. The lead single "Daddy" featuring vocals and production from Chillz was released on 25 March 2022. The song is a mixture of Afrobeats and rap, and features additional production from M.I and G-Plus. The second single and title track, "The Guy," was released on 22 July 2022. It was produced by G-Plus and Geek Beats.

== Composition ==
The Guy is a 12-track album that blends various themes, such as gratitude, fame, love, mental health, and masculinity. Musically, the album showcases a mix of Nigerian bounce, mid-tempo beats, and influences from boom bap, as seen in tracks like "Bigger", produced by M.I and the late BeatsByJayy. The album's opening title track, "The Guy", shows M.I's confidence and his reflections on his career journey. Love is another theme present in songs like "The Love Song" featuring Wande Coal, and the highlife-infused "The Inside" with Phyno and The Cavemen, which combine romance with introspective lyricism.

Mental health and social issues are tackled in songs like "Soldier" and "Crazy", which both address societal pressures and personal struggles. Tracks like "Bigger", featuring Nas and Olamide, explore success and its complexities. "The Hate" addresses critics and doubters of his legacy. "More Life", a collaboration with Jesse Jagz and Ice Prince, closes the album, celebrating collaboration and personal reflection.

== Critical reception ==
Adeayo Adebiyi of Pulse Nigeria saw The Guy as M.I's attempt to make an album that "separates the art from the artist," balancing playful and serious subject matter on the project. Adebiyi commended M.I for his skills in both rap and production, stating, "M.I is one of those Nigerian artists who can't make a bad album." He gave the album a rating of 8.2/10. Grace Hans-Bello of Digimillenials described The Guy as a progressive album that blends M.I Abaga's experiences with themes like mental health, toxic masculinity, and love, praising it for being "the most progressive body of work released in 2022." She also highlighted M.I's poetic quality, calling the album a potential blueprint for Nigerian rappers. Emmanuel Daraloye, writing for Afrocritik, praised M.I Abaga's The Guy as a diverse and emotionally rich album that explores themes like mental health, love, and success while reinforcing his legendary status, describing it as "something to dance to, meditate on," and rated it 8/10. Uzoma Ihejirika of The Native described M.I Abaga's The Guy as a reflection of his enduring legacy, with M.I blending decades of lyrical prowess and evolving with the times. M.I delivers "a melting pot" of his skills while asserting his dominance in Nigerian rap. Ihejirika wrote, "he came, saw and is still here conquering," giving the album a 7.4/10.

In Michael Aromolaran's review of The Guy for the Culture Custodian, he critiqued the rapper's tendency to rely on repetitive themes and weak lyrics, suggesting that at 40, M.I's artistry feels stale, with lines like "some of you no dey ever hear the message, and that's on Glo" lacking innovation. Aromolaran noted, "If youth breeds ambition, middle age tames it," highlighting a shift in M.I's focus from bravado to more personal themes, ultimately finding the album to lack the energy and joy of his earlier work. Tayo Odutola's of Earmilk noted that The Guy showcases M.I's versatility and growth while addressing past controversies and personal themes, stating, "MI holds his own on the record but also calls up names like Olamide, Phyno, The Cavemen, and even Nas to help embellish the project." Praising its "well-crafted" tracks and short length, Odutola concluded that the album feels "more cohesive and consistent than some of his previous outings." A review from Modaculture, written by Jennifer Okoli and Elvis Osifo, praised the album for showcasing M.I's evolution as an artist while addressing themes of growth, masculinity, and gratitude, stating, "The Guy as an album showcases a new side to M.I, highlighting his formerly unknown production skills."

=== Accolades ===
Year	Awards ceremony	Award description(s)	Results
2023	African Entertainment Awards USA	Album of the Year	Nominated

== Track listing ==
The Guy track listing
No.	Title	Writer(s)	Producer(s)	Length
1.	"The Guy"	Jude Abaga	G-Plus; Geek Beats	3:17
2.	"The Hate"	Abaga	Chopstix	3:06
3.	"Bigger" (featuring Olamide and Nas)	Abaga; Olamide Adedeji; Nasir Jones	M.I Abaga; BeatsByJayy	3:22
4.	"Soft Life Tony" (featuring Lord Vino)	Abaga; Nanven Dogun	Chopstix	2:32
5.	"The Front Door" (featuring Duncan Mighty)	Abaga; Duncan Okechukwu	Tempoe; M.I Abaga	3:42
6.	"Crazy" (featuring Ossi Grace)	Abaga; Ossi Grace	Chopstix	3:29
7.	"The Love Song" (featuring Wande Coal)	Abaga; Oluwatobi Ojosipe	Chopstix; Geek Beats	2:56
8.	"The Inside" (featuring The Cavemen and Phyno)	Abaga; Benjamin James; Kingsley Okorie; Chibuzor Azubuike	M.I Abaga; Masterkraft	2:59
9.	"Daddy" (featuring Chillz)	Abaga; Onome Ojoboh	Chillz; G-Plus; M.I Abaga	3:05
10.	"Soldier" (featuring Tomi Owó)	Abaga; Tomi Owolabi	G-Plus	4:28
11.	"Oil" (featuring Bnxn)	Abaga; Daniel Benson	G-Plus; M.I Abaga	3:18
12.	"More Life" (featuring Jesse Jagz and Ice Prince)	Abaga; Jesse Abaga; Panshak Zamani	M.I Abaga; Chopstix; Jesse Jagz	4:07
Total length:				40:25

== Release history ==
Release history and formats for The Guy
Region	Date	Format	Label
Various	19 August 2022	Streaming; digital download	Incredible Music; Chocolate City
