= The Indestructible Choc Boi Nation =

Compilation album by Chocolate City
- Released: 30 April 2015
- Recorded: 2015
- Genre: Hip Hop; trap; Jùjú; pop; house
- Length: 59:00
- Label: Chocolate City
- Producer: Various: Jesse Jagz; Reinhard; L37; Ckay; Tunday; TMXO; Teck Zilla; Nosa; DJ Caise

M.I Abaga chronology
The Chairman (2014)	The Indestructible Choc Boi Nation (2015)	Illegal Music 3 (2016)

Jesse Jagz chronology
Jagz Nation, Vol. 2: Royal Niger Company (2014)	The Indestructible Choc Boi Nation (2015)	Odysseus (2017)

Ice Prince chronology
Trash Can (2015)	The Indestructible Choc Boi Nation (2015)	Jos to the World (2016)

Singles from The Indestructible Choc Boi Nation
- 1. "Summer Time" Released: March 17 2015; 2. "Suite 99" Released: April 17 2015

The Indestructible Choc Boi Nation (abbreviated as TICBN) is a compilation album by recording artists of Nigerian record label Chocolate City. It was released exclusively on the Star Music platform for free digital streaming on April 30, 2015. The album features appearances from Ice Prince, Jesse Jagz, M.I Abaga, Nosa, Ruby Gyang, Victoria Kimani, Pryse, DJ Lambo, DJ Caise, Loose Kaynon, Dice Ailes, Milli and Koker. Its production was handled by Jesse Jagz, Reinhard, L37, Tunday, Teck Zilla, Nosa, DJ Caise, Ckay, and TMXO. The album's release celebrated the merger of Loopy Music and Chocolate City, as well as Jesse Jagz's return to the label. TICBN was released to the general public two weeks following its exclusive release on Star Music, and was supported by the singles "Summer Time" and "Suite 99".

== Background and promotion ==
The Indestructible Choc Boi Nation was recorded in 2015 and released a few weeks after Chocolate City announced a merger with Loopy Music. M.I Abaga partnered with Star Music to promote the album. He said, "We are very proud and excited to enter this new chapter in our individual and collective careers and are particularly delighted to partner with the premier Nigerian music mobile and web platform to bring the music to our fans".

The album's lead single, "Summer Time", was released on March 17, 2015. It contains additional vocals by Loose Kaynon and was co-produced by Jesse Jagz and Reinhard. Reviewing for 360nobs, Henre Igwe described the song as a "dashing piece of art in form and style" and said Jesse Jagz's production "inspires hope". Music critic Uche Briggs said the song "doesn't touch the infernal legacy of the Choc Boiz crew". The Jesse Jagz-produced track "Suite 99" was released on April 17, 2015, as the album's second single. It was jointly recorded by Jesse Jagz and Ice Prince and contains interpolations crafted by Dr. Dre and Craig Mack.

== Composition ==
The track "Summertime" is a pleasant ode to everyone's favourite time of the year. In the rap-dancehall mashup "Suite 99", Jesse Jagz reconnects with Ice Prince. "In "Restoration", he addresses his 2013 exit from Chocolate City. The trap record "Oh No No" is infused with warning bells and rattling 808’s. "Do Something" is an ode to Shina Peters's Jùjú music genre from the late 1980s and early 1990s.

== Critical reception ==
Professional ratings
Review scores
Source	Rating
Pulse Nigeria	3.5/5 stars
Nigerian Entertainment Today	3.5/5 stars

The Indestructible Choc Boi Nation received positive reviews from music critics. Writing for Pulse Nigeria, Ayomide Tayo praised the album's production and said Reinhard "stretches the sound of TICBN, embracing trap, pop, and Naija pop without losing the talents and their innocence on the project". Jim Donnett of TooXclusive called the album "decent" and said the "entire body of work is hardly boundary defying as it doesn't alter practicing trends of the industry neither does it raise the stakes or challenge the status quo".

Reviewing for Nigerian Entertainment Today, Dayo Showemimo concluded that TICBN "shows synergy between all the acts and producers as they collaborated to produce great sounds". Wilfred Okiche of 360nobs said, "TICBN isn't a shoo-in for album of the year but it plays way better than the average, vanity inspired label compilation album".

== Track listing ==
No.	Title	Writer(s)	Producer(s)	Length
1.	"Summer Time" (featuring M.I Abaga, Ice Prince and Jesse Jagz)	Jude Abaga; Panshak Zamani; Jesse Abaga	Jesse Jagz; Reinhard	4:48
2.	"Do Something" (featuring Koker)	Olayiwola Kokumo	Reinhard; L37; TMXO^{[a]}	4:14
3.	"Drank" (featuring DJ Lambo, Milli and Dice Ailes)	Olawunmi Okerayi; Milli Nasir; Shasha Alesh	Reinhard	3:52
4.	"Bass" (featuring Koker and Ice Prince)	Kokumo; Zamani	Reinhard	3:57
5.	"Oh No No" (featuring Dice Ailes)	Alesh	Tunday	3:41
6.	"Go Hard" (featuring Loose Kaynon, Milli and Ice Prince)	Joachim Ikazoboh; Nasir; Zamani	Reinhard	4:50
7.	"Ricochet" (featuring Pryse)	Princess Esindu	Teck Zilla	2:36
8.	"Loving You" (featuring Victoria Kimani and Ice Prince)	Victoria Kimani; Zamani	L37	3:00
9.	"Love Is Calling" (featuring Nosa)	Nosa Omoregie	Nosa	4:05
10.	"Loose Soul" (featuring Ruby Gyang and DJ Caise)	Ngohide GyangGyang; Derin Phillips	DJ Caise; Reinhard	3:42
11.	"No More" (featuring Ruby Gyang and Jesse Jagz)	GyangGyang; Abaga	Reinhard; Jesse Jagz	3:24
12.	"Heartfelt" (featuring Milli and Koker)	Kokumo; Nasir	Reinhard	3:43
13.	"3rd Mainland Bridge" (featuring M.I Abaga and Moti Cakes)	Abaga; Motolani Awokoya	Ckay	4:04
14.	"Suite 99" (featuring Jesse Jagz and Ice Prince)	Abaga; Zamani	Jesse Jagz; L37	4:21
15.	"Restoration" (featuring Jesse Jagz, M.I Abaga and Milli)	Abaga; Abaga; Nasir	Jesse Jagz	4:40
Total length:				59:00

Notes

- ^{^[a]} Signifies an Additional co-producer
- "Do Something" contains additional vocals by Nosa
- "No More" contains additional vocals by Debbie Romeo
- "Summer Time" contains additional vocals by Loose Kaynon

== Release history ==
Digital platform	Date	Version	Format	Label
Star Music	April 30, 2015	Standard	Digital download	Chocolate City
Various	May 1, 2015	Standard	Digital download	Chocolate City
