= Chopstix (music producer) =

Nigerian record producer

- Born: Olagundoye James Malcolm; 8 April; Jos, Plateau State
- Occupations: record producer; songwriter; composer; sound engineer
- Years active: 2011–present
- Musical career
- Genres: Afrofusion; Afrobeats; Afropop; Hip-Hop; Dancehall
- Instrument: Piano
- Label: Summertime Music
- Member of: Grip Boiz

Olagundoye James Malcolm popularly known as Chopstix is a Nigerian Grammy Award-winning and 4× Platinum-certified record producer. He began his career as a member of the Grip Movement, which was made up of Yung L, Endia, and J Milla. The movement became popular as Grip Boiz in 2013, and they popularized explicit lyrics on Dancehall as heard on Ice Prince's "Magician" in 2011, and Chopstix's "Stinking Shit" in 2014, which got nominated at The Headies for Best Reggae/Dancehall Single of the Year.

Chopstix served as the primary producer on Ice Prince second studio album Fire of Zamani, released on 28 October 2013 through Chocolate City. The project lead tracks include "Aboki", "Gimme Dat", "I Swear", and "More", all produced by Chopstix from 2012 to 2013 at Chocolate City Studio in Lagos, and earned him a nomination at the 2014 City People Music Awards for Best Music Producer of the Year. Off the project, Chopstix and Don Jazzy co-produced "N Word [Remix]" featuring the South African late-rapper AKA.

Chopstix gained international recognition in 2023 for co-producing and co-writing Burna Boy's "Last Last", and his sixth album Love, Damini, which both got nominated at the Grammy's, and earned him a special recognition as a composer. In 2024, Broadcast Music, Inc. honored Chopstix with the BMI R&B/Hip-Hop Awards for co-writing Burna Boy's "Last Last". In 2020, Burna Boy's Grammy-nominated Best World Music Album African Giant, earned him a special recognition from The Recording Academy. In 2025, Chris Brown's Grammy Award-winning Best R&B Album 11:11, earned him a special recognition from The Recording Academy.

== Early career ==
=== Grip Boiz ===
In 2011, Chopstix, Yung L, Endia, and J Milla began the Grip Movement, which became popular in 2013 as a Dancehall collective known as Grip Boiz. In 2016, Grip Boiz dissolved, following the exit of Yung L, who at that time was finalizing his record deal with Chocolate City. The label is known for producing one of African Hip-Hop rappers which redefined African hip-hop, and birth the hip-hop collective known as Choc Boiz, which was made up of M.I Abaga, Jesse Jagz, Ice Prince, and Brymo. In 2017, Yung L joined Chocolate City.

On 1 May 2014, Industry Nite confirmed hosting Grip Boiz in this week's edition. On 2 May 2014, Grip Boiz (Chopstix, Yung L, Endia, and J Milla) performed at Industry Nite, with guest performers from Splash, Loose Kaynon, Ketchup, Reminisce, Iyanya, Ice Prince, and M.I Abaga. Other musicians present at Industry Nite include Wizkid, Dammy Krane, Vector, Falz, Clarence Peters, Noble Igwe, Osi Suave, Skales, Emma Nyra, Kenny Ogungbe, Jimmy, Praiz, Tunde Ednut and many others.

=== 2012–2017:"Aboki", "SOS", "Rockstar", and Coke Studio ===
In 2012, Chopstix produced Ice Prince's "Aboki", and "More", as the first and second lead singles off his second studio album Fire of Zamani, studio album released through Chocolate City. He rose to prominence, following the release of Fire of Zamani album, in which he served as the primary producer, and was nominated at the 2014 City People Music Awards for Best Music Producer of the Year. In 2013, Chopstix produced Ice Prince's singles "Gimme Dat" and I Swear", as the third and fourth lead singles off the album.

Early 2013, Yung L emerged into the limelight with a Chopstix-produced single titled "S.O.S", released on 24 July 2013, through Grip Muzik. In 2015, Burna Boy launch his record label Spaceship Entertainment, and released "Rockstar" as the first single under the label produced by Chopstix. *Return of the Kings On 29 November 2015, CHopstix performed alongside M.I Abaga, Jesse Jagz, Jeremiah Gyang, and DJ Lambo at the inaugural edition of ‘Return of the Kings’ Concert in Jos, with 2face Idibia.

On 13 October 2016, Chopstix was in attendance of Coke Studio Africa, season 4 launch party in Lagos, with 2Baba, Falz, Yemi Alade, among others. On 20 November 2016, Chopstix produced "Bad For You" for Coke Studio Africa season 4, performed by Yemi Alade, and Nyashinski. On 10 June 2016, Yung L's "Pass the Aux" was released and produced by Chopstix. On 12 May 2017, Chopstix produced, co-wrote and provided vocal on Major Lazer's "Run Up (Afrosmash Remix)" featuring Skales, and Yung L.

=== 2018–2023:"Last Last", "Nightmares", and Hennessy Cypher ===
On 23 May 2018, Mr Eazi released "London Town", co-produced by Chopstix, Moelogo, and Da Beatfreakz, as the second single off his third mixtape titled Life Is Eazi, Vol. 2 – Lagos to London. On 16 December 2020, Chopstix produced the Hennessy Cypher series, which features 12 Nigerian rappers including Falz, M.I Abaga, Vector, Jesse Jagz, CDQ, Tec & Ghost of Show Dem Camp, Payper Corleone, Teeto Ceemos, Vader the Wildcard, Phlow, and Therealbarrylane.

On 22 September 2020, Chopstix appeared in episode two of The Conversation by Hennessy. The episode focused on the beef between M.I Abaga and Vector regarding their frosty relationship over the years. He co-produced and co-wrote Burna Boy's first Grammy-nominated World album African Giant, which earned him his first special recognition from The Recording Academy. On 13 May 2022, Chopstix gained international recognition with Burna Boy's most controversial single "Last Last", which he co-produced.

Then, he went on to work on Burna Boy's sixth studio album Love, Damini, which got nominated at The Grammy's for Best Global Album and earned him a special recognition from The Recording Academy as a composer. At the 2022 All Africa Music Awards, Burna Boy's Love, Damini won Album of the Year. On 7 November 2023, Chris Brown released the third lead single "Nightmares" featuring Byron Messia off his eleventh studio album 11:11, released on 10 November 2023. The album was co-written and co-produced by Chopstix.

=== 2024–present: 11:11 (deluxe), and Sonic the Hedgehog 3 soundtrack ===
On 11 April 2024, Chris Brown released the deluxe version of his eleventh studio album 11:11, which won the Best R&B Album at the 67th Annual Grammy Awards, and earned Chopstix a special recognition from The Recording Academy as a composer, on his fourth attempt at the Grammy's. In 2024, following the release of Sonic the Hedgehog 3 soundtrack album score by Tom Holkenborg, features additional music by Mr Eazi titled "London Town" produced by Chopstix, from his third mixtape Lagos to London.

On 30 May 2025, Chopstix, and Yaadman fka Yung L released a joint album, exclusively produced by Chopstix, titled OXYTOCIN, released under Summertime Music, and Zimmlife. On 6 June 2025, he curated and exclusively produced Ice Prince sixth extended play Starters, released under Super Cool Cat.

== Accolades ==
Awards and nominations
Award	Wins	Nominations
Nigeria Entertainment Awards	0	1
Nigeria Music Video Awards	0	1
The Headies	0	1
City People Entertainment Awards	0	1
The Beatz Awards	0	2
Grammy Awards	1	3
Soundcity MVP Awards Festival	0	1

Totals (Note: Certain award groups do not simply award one winner. They acknowledge several different recipients, have runners-up, and have third place. Since this is a specific recognition and is different from losing an award, runner-up mentions are considered wins in this award tally. For simplification and to avoid errors, each award in this list has been presumed to have had a prior nomination.)
- Wins: 1
- Nominations: 10

=== Nigeria Entertainment Awards ===
Year	Award description(s)	Work	Results
2013	Music Producer of the Year	Himself	Nominated

=== Nigeria Music Video Awards ===
Year	Award description(s)	Work	Results
2014	Best Reggae/Dancehall	"Stinking Shit" by (Chopstix)	Nominated

=== The Headies ===
Year	Award description(s)	Work	Results
2014	Best Reggae/Dancehall Single	"Stinking Shit" by (Chopstix)	Nominated

=== City People Entertainment Awards ===
Year	Award description(s)	Work	Results
2014	Music Producer of the Year	Himself	Nominated

=== The Beatz Awards ===
Year	Award description(s)	Work	Results
2018	Best Afro Dancehall Producer	Himself – "Gba" by Burna Boy)	Nominated
2021	Afro Dancehall Producer of the Year	Himself – "Kilometer" by (Burna Boy)	Nominated

=== Grammy Awards ===
Year	Award description(s)	Work	Results
2020	Best World Music Album	African Giant by (Burna Boy)	Nominated
2023	Best Global Music Performance	"Last Last" by (Burna Boy)	Nominated
2023	Best Global Music Album	Love, Damini by (Burna Boy)	Nominated
2025	Best R&B Album	11:11 by (Chris Brown)	Won

=== Soundcity MVP Awards Festival ===
Year	Award description(s)	Work	Results
2023	African Producer of the Year	Himself – "Last Last" by (Burna Boy)	Nominated

=== BMI R&B/Hip-Hop Awards ===
Year	Award description(s)	Work	Results
2024	Songwriters & Publishers of the Most-Performed Songs of the Year	Himself – "Last Last" by (Burna Boy)	Honored

== Events and concerts ==
=== Events ===
- The Dreams Workshop (2016), with Waje, and Chin Okeke.
- Pulse VIP Night With DJ Caise (2014), with DJ Caise, Ice Prince, Endia, Loose Kaynon, DJ Lambo, and Stephanie Coker.

=== Concerts ===
- MTV's Africa All Stars concert (2013), with 2Baba, Ice Prince, and Davido.

== Filmography ==
=== Music videos ===
Year	Title	Singer(s)	Note(s)	Ref.
2014	"N Word (remix)"	Ice Prince	Cameo appearance	
