= Dice Ailes =

Nigerian singer, songwriter and rapper

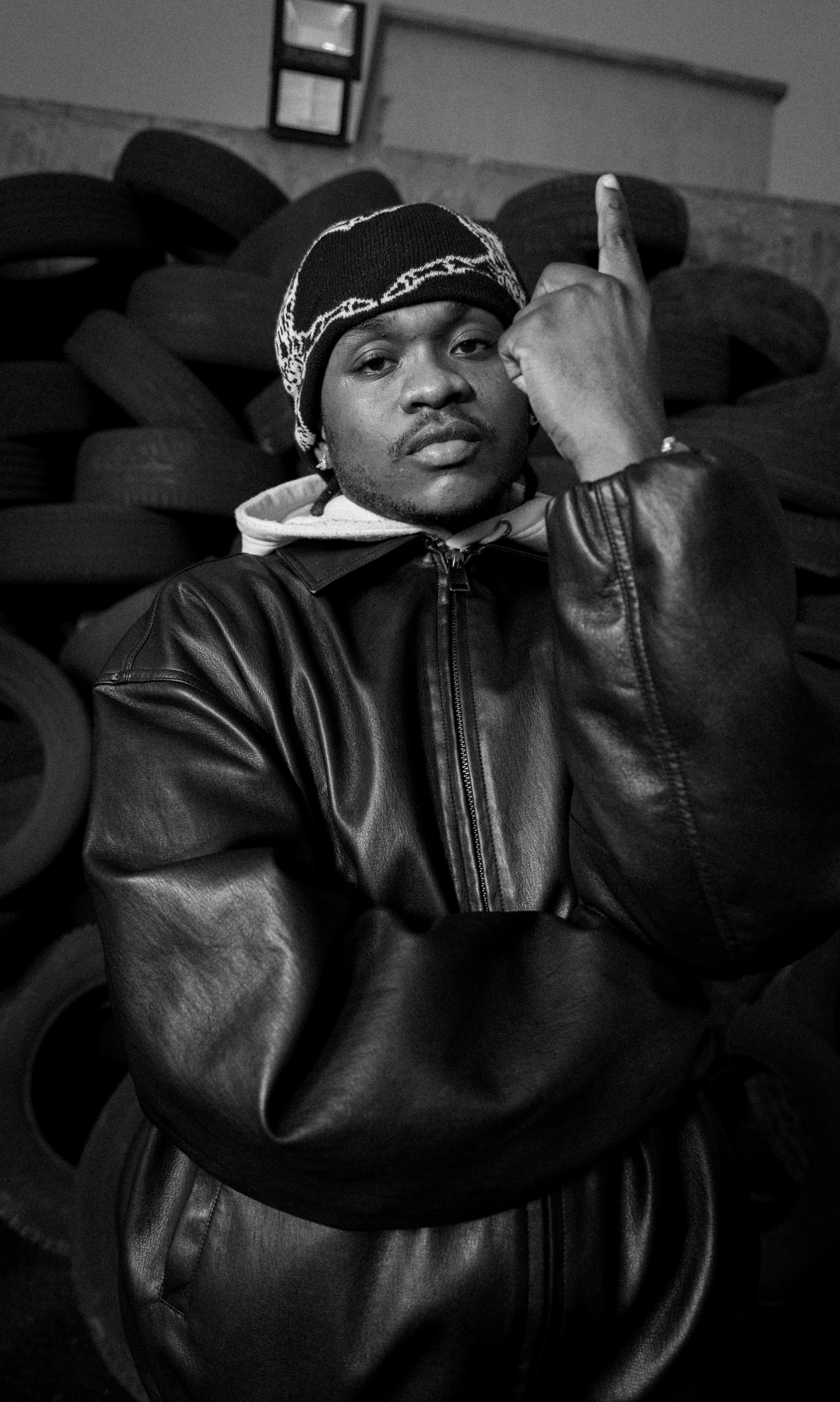
- Win ‘EP’ press photo, 2024
- Born: Shasha Damilola Alesh; 1 August 1996 (age 30)
- Education: York University
- Occupations: Singer; songwriter; rapper
- Years active: 2014–present
- Musical career
- Genres: Pop; Afro pop; Afro hip-hop

Dice Ailes (born Shasha Damilola Alesh) is a Nigerian singer whose musical style blends Afro-pop, hip-hop, and R&B. Born in Lagos, Nigeria, he began his musical career in Toronto, Canada. He began creating music at the age of 15. His debut single, "Fantasy," released in 2014, garnered his position within the Afrobeats scene.

== Early life and education ==
He schooled in Nigeria at Lagooz college, Republic of Benin, and Ghana then relocated to Canada where he studied at York University and also started his musical career before relocating back to Nigeria after his record deal with Chocolate City in 2014.

== Career ==
He started out in a church choir. He started out too with Hyce- age, coker, Millie and Reihnard while in the label. He achieved recognition in 2016 for his CKay-produced single "Miracle" featuring Lil Kesh.

On 21 December 2016, Dice Ailes shared stage with the likes of WSTRN, Krept and Konan, Migos alongside Lil Kesh at the "Beat FM Xmas concert" 2016 in Lagos.

In an interview with Tush Magazine, Dice Ailes describes his style of music as "Afro-pop RnB". In his words:

I'm a pretty versatile artist. I don't have a specific genre. I started off rapping, then as I grew up it sort of just graduated to a lot of different stuff. So right now, I just do Afro-pop, RnB; you know what I'm saying, I just mix everything up.

== Discography ==
=== Singles ===
As lead artist
Year	Title	Album
2014	"Fantasy"	Non-album single
2014	"Telephone"	Non-album single
2015	"Machinery"	Non-album single
2016	"Miracle"	Non-album single
2017	"Ella"	Non-album single
2017	"Otedola"	Non-album single
2018	"mr biggs"	Non-album single
2018	"Dicey"	Non-album single
2018	"Enough"	Non-album single
2019	"Alakori"(feat. Falz)"Ginika"	Non-album single
2020	"Pim Pim" (feat Olamide)	Non-album single
2021	"Money Dance"	Non-album single
2022	"Leftside"	Ladies First
2022	"Pray As You go"	Ladies First
2022	"Rosalia" (feat. Kady Cain)	Ladies First
2022	"Monica"	Ladies First
2022	"Zombie"	Ladies First
2022	"Hold me" (feat. Tiwa Savage)	Ladies First
2024	"Dicey Baba"	
2025	"Towa"	Win

As featured artist
Year	Title	Album
2015	"Awon Temi" (Loose Kaynon feat. Dice Ailes & Koker)	The Gemini Project
2016	"Brooklyn" (Ice Prince feat. Dice Ailes)	Jos to the World
2017	"Olohungbo" (Masterkraft feat. Ceeza, YCEE & Dice Ailes)	Non-album single
2017	"No Favors" (Yung6ix feat. Dice Ailes & Mr. Jollof)	Non-album single
2017	"Your Father" (M.I Abaga feat. Dice Ailes)	Rendezvous
2019	"Que Cera" (Vision DJ feat. Dice Ailes, Kwesi Arthur, Medikal)	
2020	"Pressure" ( Spinall, feat. Dice Ailes)	
2021	"Focus" remix (Ajimovoix feat. Dice Ailes)	

=== Compilation singles ===
As lead artist
Year	Title	Album
2015	"Drank" (DJ Lambo, Milli, Dice Ailes)	TICBN
2015	"Oh No No" (Dice Ailes)	TICBN

=== Compilation albums ===
Year	Title	Released date
2015	The Indestructible Choc Boi Nation	30 April 2015

=== Cover ===
As lead artist
Year	Artist	Title
2016	MI & Dice Ailes	"Controlla (refix)"

== Awards and nominations ==
Year	Event	Prize	Recipient	Result
2015	tooXclusive Awards	Best New Artiste	Himself	Nominated
2016	The Headies	Rookie of The Year	Himself	Nominated
2018	The Headies	Next Rated	Himself	Nominated

== See also ==
- List of Nigerian musicians
