= King James (M.I song) =

Promotional single by M.I
- Released: August 21, 2014
- Recorded: 2014
- Genre: Hip hop
- Length: 3:30
- Label: Chocolate City
- Songwriter: Jude Abaga
- Producer: Jude Abaga

"King James" is a song by Nigerian rapper M.I. Written and produced by M.I himself, the song was released by Chocolate City on August 21, 2014. M.I described the song as a "non-profit project designed to create awareness and inspire social change". "King James" was serviced to radio stations in Nigeria, Kenya, Malawi and South Africa. On the record, M.I proclaims to be the "best rapper alive". Critical reception to "King James" was generally mixed.

== Background and lyric video ==
"King James" is a self adulation track with a reggae melody. Prior to its release, M.I hinted to possibly retiring. It has been alleged that "King James" was indirectly directed at Olamide. The song's lyric video was uploaded to YouTube on August 21, 2014.

== Art exhibition ==
In a bid to promote "King James" and touch-base on a wide variety of topics, M.I held an art exhibition and leadership symposium at Terra Kulture in Victoria Island, Lagos. Speakers at the event included Akinwunmi Ambode, Audu Maikori, Toyosi Akerele and Adebola Williams. During the event, M.I said the song will not be part of his third studio album, The Chairman (2014).

== Critical reception ==
Upon release, "King James" was met with mixed reviews from music critics. Oscar Okeke of Lobatan commended the song's production, brevity and flow, but rejected its lines. Jim Donnett awarded the song 4.5 stars out of 5, characterizing it as "a fine brag" and saying it is "worth every word and sound". Donnett also acknowledged M.I for "reclaiming a throne that he wasn't exactly unseated from while throwing his weight around as Naija's best rapper alive".
