= Everybody Loves Ice Prince =

Studio album by Ice Prince
- Released: October 9, 2011
- Recorded: 2010–2011
- Genre: Hip hop; R&B; Afrobeats; dancehall; ragga; reggae; soul; highlife
- Length: 72:02
- Label: Chocolate City
- Producer: Audu Maikori (exec.); Yahaya Maikori (exec.); Paul Okeugo (exec.); Jude Abaga (co-exec.); Jesse Abaga (co-exec.); WizBoyy; E Kelly; Samklef; Chopstix

Ice Prince chronology
Everybody Loves Ice Prince (2011)	Fire of Zamani (2013)

Singles from Everybody Loves Ice Prince
- 1. "Oleku" Released: June 8, 2010; 2. "Superstar" Released: April 22, 2011; 3. "Juju" Released: February 18, 2012

Everybody Loves Ice Prince (abbreviated as E.L.I) is the debut studio album by Nigerian rapper Ice Prince, released by Chocolate City on October 9, 2011. The album's production was primarily handled by Jesse Jagz, along with additional production from M.I Abaga, Wizboyy, E Kelly, Samklef and Chopstix. E.L.I features collaborations with Brymo, Wizkid, 2 Face Idibia, Jesse Jagz, M.I, Yung L, J-Milla, Samklef, Wizboyy, Morell, and Sean Tero. The album was supported by the singles "Oleku", "Superstar", and "Juju". It is a mixture of hip hop, R&B, dancehall, ragga, Afrobeats, reggae, highlife, and soul.

== Background ==
Ice Prince signed a record deal with Chocolate City in 2009. He spent the next year featuring on the tracks of other artists, including Naeto C and Banky W. Moreover, he started working on the album with label mates Brymo, M.I and Jesse Jagz. In writing the album, Ice Prince wanted to create a work that would not let his fans down after all they had done for him. Days before its release, the album was known simply as E.L.I., with the full title being kept under wraps. Prior to Chocolate City disclosing that E.L.I is an acronym for Everybody Loves Ice Prince, there were numerous speculations about its meaning. While speaking to the Nigerian Tribune about the album, Ice Prince said, "At first, I wanted to name the album after the street I used to live in Jos but when I lost my mother, the mad love I got from everybody around the world made me change it to Everybody Loves Ice Prince".

=== Composition ===
Predominantly a hip hop album, E.L.I incorporates other musical styles such as R&B, dancehall, raga, Afrobeats, reggae, highlife, and soul. Ice Prince deliberately explores these genres to avoid being seen as "just another rapper". In an interview with Naija Entertainment, he described the album as a "fusion of many genres". According to Chocolate City, E.L.I is an album centered around and influenced by love and music. Ice Prince said the album draws a lot of influence and motivation from his mother's death, as well as from the outpouring of love and encouragement he received as consolation from his fans. All songs on the album were written by Panshak Zamani, except where the track features another artist.

=== Promotion ===
E.L.I was launched in Lagos on 9 October 2011, at the Expo Hall of the Eko Hotels and Suites. The launch concert featured performances from Ice Prince Jesse Jagz, M.I, DJ Caise, 2face Idibia, D'banj, Wizkid, Naeto C, D'Prince, Tiwa Savage, Samklef, Brymo, Hip Hop Pantsula, and Sarkodie. The event was hosted by radio personality Ikponmwosa Osakioduwa and actress Funke Akindele. The album's lead single, "Oleku", was released on June 8, 2011. It was well-received and created anticipation behind the album. The song is one of the most remixed Nigerian songs of 2010. The second single, "Superstar", was released on April 22, 2011. It received radio airplay but was not as successful as "Oleku". "Juju" was released as the third single. The song's accompanying music video was filmed by Godfather Productions and leaked on February 18, 2012.

== Critical reception ==
Everybody Loves Ice Prince received mixed reviews from music critics. It was generally a good album, but did not live up to the hype surrounding it. Some critics found that in an attempt to appeal to a majority of the public by mixing in a lot of genres, Ice Prince lost the direction and unifying sound of a pure hip hop record. Others have commended Ice Prince on adding other genres because they feel that it creates a new sound and adds variety to the listening experience. The variety of styles reflects on the full scope of the music Ice Prince writes, rather than just one section of it.

Another criticism of the album was that it varies greatly in the quality of the music. Some critics found that the album was made up of several excellent songs, strung together by a fleet of bad ones. A common complaint was that the lyrics were full of cheesy lines, which do not help his (Ice Prince's) credibility. The album was commended on its catchy singable tunes and public appeal. Generally, Everybody Loves Ice Prince was praised for being a great shot at a debut album, if not slightly over hyped.

=== Accolades ===
E.L.I won Best Rap Album and was nominated for Album of the Year at The Headies 2012.

== Track listing ==
No.	Title	Producer(s)	Length
1.	"Remember (Intro)"	Jude Abaga	4:18
2.	"Juju"	Jesse Abaga	4:52
3.	"Superstar"	Jesse Abaga	4:18
4.	"Magician" (featuring Yung L and J-Milla)	Jesse Abaga	3:54
5.	"Baby"	Jesse Abaga	3:48
6.	"Olofofo" (featuring Wizkid)	Jude Abaga	4:42
7.	"See Myself"	Jesse Abaga	4:15
8.	"Wassup Wassup" (featuring Tuface Idibia)	Jesse Abaga	3:53
9.	"Oleku" (featuring Brymo)	Jesse Abaga	4:50
10.	"Find You"	Jesse Abaga	4:17
11.	"By This Time" (featuring Wizboyy)	Wizboyy	4:00
12.	"Somebody Lied"	E Kelly	3:59
13.	"Small Small" (featuring Sean Tero)	Jesse Abaga	4:24
14.	"That Nigga" (featuring Morell)	Jesse Abaga	4:30
15.	"End of Story" (featuring Samklef)	Samklef	3:58
16.	"Raindrops (It’s All Good)"	Jesse Abaga	4:38
17.	"Thank You" (featuring Jesse Jagz, Brymo and M.I as ChocBoiz)	Chopstix; Jude Abaga	3:26
Total length:			72:02

== Personnel ==
The following people contributed to Everybody Loves Ice Prince:

- Panshak Zamani – primary artist, writer
- Audu Maikori – executive producer
- Paul Okeugo – executive producer
- Yahaya Maikori – executive producer
- Jesse Abaga – co-executive producer, featured artist, production (tracks 2, 3, 4, 5, 7, 8, 9, 10, 13, 14, 16)
- Jude Abaga – co-executive producer, featured artist, mixing, mastering, production (tracks 1, 6, 17)
- Abuchi "Don Boos Boos" Ugwu – mixing and mastering
- Wizboyy – featured artist, production (tracks 11)
- E Kelly – production (tracks 12)
- Samklef – featured artist, production (tracks 15)
- Chopstix – production (tracks 17)
- Yung L – featured artist
- J-Milla – featured artist
- Ayodeji Balogun – featured artist
- Innocent Ujah Idibia – featured artist
- Olawale Ashimi – featured artist
- Sean Tero – featured artist
- Morell – featured artist
- Ogbonnaya “Big Meech” Chukwudi – art direction and cover design
- Augustine Victor Udoh – photography
- Bishmang Nanle – A&R/management
- Doosuur Tilley Gyado – A&R/management
- Terver "Trump" Malu – team member
- Amaka Okwuonu – team member
- Kunle Peter Thomas – team member
- Mavrik Films – team member
- Sola Oladebo – team member
- Ibiyemi Bello – team member
- Bukola Izeogu – team member
- Seyi Sanusi – team member
- Sam Lolo – team member
- Ebere Thomas – team member
- Oyiboka George – team member
- Katung Aduwak – team member
