= DJ Lambo =

Nigerian DJ

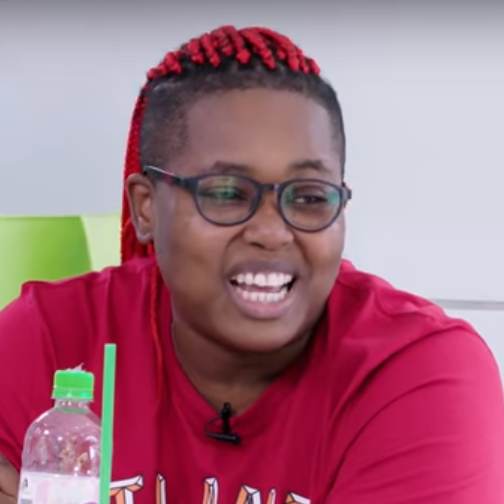
- Born: Olawunmi Okerayi; Nigeria
- Other name: DJ Lamborghini
- Education: International College of Creative Arts; University of Abuja
- Occupations: Disc jockey; radio personality; hype man
- Years active: 2013-present
- Musical career
- Genres: Afropop; hip hop; techno
- Label: Chocolate City

Olawunmi Okerayi, known by her stage name DJ Lambo, is a Nigerian disc jockey. Her song "Drank" was produced by Reinhard and received positive critical reviews and extensive airplay. She was signed to Loopy Music in 2013 before its merger with Chocolate City in 2015. She won DJ of the Year (Female) at the 2016 City People Entertainment Awards. Nigerian Entertainment Today (NET) listed her as one of top five Nigerian DJs to watch out for in 2015.

In 2017, DJ Lambo was among the few DJs selected to play at Big Brother Nigeria's season 2 Saturday party of the Big Brother Naija reality game show.

== Early life and music career ==
=== Early life ===
DJ Lambo grew up with four brothers in Nigeria. Her father, DJ Tony Lewis influenced her career as a disc jockey. She started her career in 2008–2009 as a Radio personality|(OAP) on Raypower 100.5 FM, Rhythm FM 94.7 Abuja, and Love 104.5 FM Abuja.

=== Artistry ===
DJ Lambo describes her sound as a fusion of house music, techno, afropop and hip hop. Her song "Drank" was produced by Reinhard and received positive critical reviews and extensive airplay. She was signed to Loopy Music in 2013 before its merge with Chocolate City in 2015.

=== Smirnoff Equalizing Music ===
On March 8, 2017, Smirnoff launched the Equalizing Music initiative on behalf of the International Women's Day to celebrate female DJs around the world. DJ Lambo was ranked number 18 on the Smirnoff Top Women Electronic Artists playlist with her single "Motion".

On March 20, 2017, Smirnoff Nigeria also celebrated International Women's Day at Crest Hotels and Garden Jos with the top three finalists of the Smirnoff X1 Female DJ contestants alongside DJ Lambo and DJ Spinall at the event.

=== Choc Boi Nation President ===
On 14 June 2017, she was named the head and president of Choc Boi Nation (CBN), a record imprint of Chocolate City Music. With this announcement she became one of the major female record label executives in the music industry in Nigeria. The press conference, held in Lagos, was attended by co-label mates MI Abaga, Dice Ailes, Koker and Loose Kaynon

== Educational background ==
DJ Lambo attended International College of Creative Arts and has a degree in English and Literature from the University of Abuja She is also an alma mater of Methodist Girls High School.

== Notable performances ==
She has performed at several popular events and shows since her rise to stardom, including:

Event	Year
"Big Brother Naija"	2017
"Smirnoff House Party (SMIRNOFF X1 FEMALE DJ)"	2017
"Big Brother Naija"	2018
"Big Brother Naija"	2019
"Turn Up Friday With Pepsi"	2020
"Big Brother Naija"	2020
"Desperados Launch Party"	2020
"Heineken's Formula1 Party"	2020

== Discography ==
=== Singles ===
As lead artist
Year	Title	Album
2015	"The Motion" (feat. Seyi Shay, Cynthia Morgan & Eva Alordiah)	"Girl Power"
2017	"Bebe" (feat. Victoria Kimani & Skalez)	Non-Album Single
2018	"Kunta Kunte" (feat. Small Doctor & Mr. Real)	Non-Album Single
2020	"Bella" (feat. Iyanya & Lady Donli)	A Tale Of Two Cities

=== As featured artist ===
List of singles as featured artist, with certifications, showing year released and album name
Year	Title	Certifications	Album
2014	"Millionaira Champagne" (M.I featuring Ice Prince, Sarkodie & DJ Lambo)	30,000 in pre order sales	The Chairman

=== Compilation singles ===
As lead artist
Year	Title	Album
2015	"Drank" (DJ Lambo, Milli & Dice Ailes)	"TICBN" & "SUMMERTIME DANCE-OFF MIX"

=== Compilation albums ===
Year	Title	Released date
2015	The Indestructible Choc Boi Nation	30 April 2015

=== Mixtape album ===
Year	Title	Released date
2015	SUMMERTIME DANCE-OFF MIX	17 July 2015
2016	Girl Power	19 May 2016

== Awards and nominations ==
Year	Event	Prize	Recipient	Result
2016	City People Entertainment Awards	DJ of the Year (Female)	Herself	Won
2016	Nigeria Entertainment Awards	Disk Jockey of the Year (Female)	Herself	Nominated
2021	Beatz Awards	Female DJ of the Year	Herself	Won
2022	Beatz Awards	Female DJ of the Year	Herself	Won
