= Illegal Music 3 =

Mixtape by M.I Abaga
- Released: 29 February 2016
- Recorded: 2015–2016
- Genre: Hip hop
- Length: 49:23
- Label: Chocolate City
- Producer: M.I, Ckay, G-Plus

M.I Abaga chronology
The Indestructible Choc Boi Nation (2015)	Illegal Music 3 (2016)	Rendezvous (2018)

Singles from Illegal Music 3
- 1. "Everything I Have Seen" Released: February 11, 2016

Illegal Music 3 (stylized as Illegal Music 3: The Finale) is the third and final mixtape of the "Illegal Music" series by Nigerian rapper M.I. It was released by Chocolate City on 29 February 2016, and features guest appearances from Ruby Gyang, Ckay, Pryse, Khaligraph Jones, and Poe. The mixtape was supported by the single "Everything I Have Seen", which was released on 11 February 2016. Illegal Music 3 was primarily produced by M.I, with additional production from Ckay and G-Plus.

== Track listing ==
All tracks are written by Jude Abaga except where there is a feature.

No.	Title	Producer(s)	Length
1.	"The Finale"	M.I	5:48
2.	"Everything I Have Seen"	M.I	4:56
3.	"Black Bill Gates" (featuring Khaligraph Jones)	M.I	3:51
4.	"All Fall Down" (featuring Poe)	M.I; G-Plus	4:56
5.	"NotJustOk/Savage"	M.I	5:06
6.	"Numbers"	M.I	3:51
7.	"Head of the Family"	M.I; CKay	7:42
8.	"The Box" (featuring Pryse and CKay)	M.I; CKay	4:45
9.	"Sedi"	M.I	2:37
10.	"Remember Me" (featuring Ruby Gyang)	M.I
Total length:			49:23
