= V.I.P (Ice Prince song) =

Single by Ice Prince
- Released: April 24, 2013
- Recorded: 2013
- Genre: Hip hop
- Length: 3:10
- Label: Chocolate City
- Songwriter: Panshak Zamani
- Producer: Chopstix

Ice Prince singles chronology
"Gimme Dat" (2013)	"V.I.P" (2013)	"I Swear" (2013)

Music video
- "V.I.P" on YouTube

"V.I.P" is a song by Nigerian rapper Ice Prince. It was released on April 24, 2013, by Chocolate City. The song was originally intended to be included on Ice Prince's second studio album, Fire of Zamani (2013), but was ultimately removed from the final track list due to reasons that haven't been made public. It peaked at number 26 on Afribiz's Top 100 chart. "V.I.P" debuted at number nine on MTV Base's Official Naija Top 10 chart for the week of July 6 through July 13, 2013, and entered the music countdown along with "Personally".

== Music video ==
=== Background ===
The music video for "V.I.P" was directed by Clarence Peters at Dream Studios and uploaded to YouTube on June 21, 2013. The video features cameo appearances from several acts, including M.I, Dr SID, and Phyno. On June 11, 2013, a behind-the-scenes video from the filming of "V.I.P." was posted on YouTube.

=== Controversy ===
Peters came under fire for allegedly stealing the aesthetic of Slaughterhouse's "My Life" video and using it for the "V.I.P" video. In February 2014, Ice Prince defended Peters' actions and said he told him the ideas to shoot. He also stated that if anyone has a problem with the situation, they should hold him responsible.

== Critical reception ==
Upon its release, "V.I.P" received mixed reviews from music critics. A writer for the website Jaguda.com criticized the song for sounding "eerily similar to Aboki". Aribaba, another editor for Jaguda.com, gave the song a rating of 5 out of 10, praising its instrumentation and chorus, while denouncing it for lacking freshness and excitement.

=== Accolades ===
The music video for "V.I.P" was nominated for Best Use of Visual Effects and Best Hip Hop Video at the 2013 Nigeria Music Video Awards.

== Release history ==
Region	Date	Format	Label
Nigeria	April 24, 2013	CD, Digital download	Chocolate City
