= Oleku (song) =

Single by Ice Prince featuring Brymo

from the album Everybody Loves Ice Prince
- Released: 21 September 2010
- Recorded: 2010
- Genre: Hip hop; Afrobeats
- Length: 4:50
- Label: Chocolate City
- Songwriters: Panshak Zamani and Olawale Ashimi
- Producer: Jesse Abaga

Ice Prince singles chronology
"Rewind" (2010)	"Oleku" (2010)	"Superstar" (2011)

Brymo singles chronology
"Oleku" (2010)	"Attention" (2011)

Music video
- "Oleku" on YouTube

"Oleku" is a song by Nigerian rapper Ice Prince, released by Chocolate City on September 21, 2010. It features vocals by Brymo and serves as the lead single from his debut studio album, Everybody Loves Ice Prince (2011). "Oleku" is one of the most remixed Nigerian songs of all time, and was played alongside Naeto C's "Ten Over Ten" and D'banj's "Scapegoat". "Oleku" won several accolades, including Hottest Single of the Year at the 2011 Nigeria Entertainment Awards and Song of the Year at the 2011 City People Entertainment Awards.

== Background and music video ==
In an interview with Tim Westwood on BBC Radio 1Xtra, Ice Prince said "Oleku" translates to hard or strong. He told Factory78 TV that he began writing the song's lyrics after receiving a beat from Sarz and said the song's instrumental was recorded under 30 minutes. He also said Jesse Jagz played different chords and created the instrumental after hearing him sing "she feeling me boy yeah, she feeling me boy". Moreover, he said he needed more melodies and reached out to Brymo.

The accompanying music video for "Oleku" features cameo appearances from M.I, Jesse Jagz and Wizkid. Ice Prince revealed to Factory78 TV that Chocolate City did not like the first cut submitted and told the director to redo the video. An unauthorized release of the first cut surfaced on the internet prior to the official release.

== Accolades ==
Year	Awards ceremony	Award description(s)	Results	Ref
2010	Dynamix All Youth Awards	Song of the Year	Nominated	
2011	City People Entertainment Awards	Song of the Year	Won	
2011	Nigeria Entertainment Awards	Hottest Single of the Year	Won	
2011	Nigerian Music Video Awards (NMVA)	Best Contemporary Afro Video	Nominated	
2011	Channel O Music Video Awards	Most Gifted Newcomer Video	Won	
2011	The Headies	Best Rap Single	Won	
2011	The Headies	Song of the Year	Won	
2011	The Headies	Best Collaboration	Nominated	
2011	The Headies	Next Rated (Ice Prince for "Oleku")	Nominated	
2011	The Headies	Lyricist on the Roll (Ice Prince for "Oleku")	Nominated	

== Covers ==
Since the official release of "Oleku" in 2010, numerous remixes and cover versions have been released. "Oleku" is one of Nigeria's most remixed songs of all time, and was covered by Kagwe Mungai, Vector, Mugeez of R2Bees, Victoria Kimani, Sarkodie, and Yung6ix.

No.	Title	Writer(s)	Length
1.	"Oleku"	Panshak Zamani and Olawale Ashimi	4:50
2.	"Oleku (Cover)" (by Kagwe Mungai)	Kagwe Mungai	3:27
3.	"Oleku (Vector Version)" (by Vector)	Vector	3:17
4.	"Pussy (Oleku)" (by Mugeez)	Mugeez	2:37
7.	"Shame! (Oleku Cover)" (by Atumpan featuring A.O)	Atumpan and A.O	4:09
8.	"Oleku Warri Remix" (by Yung6ix)	Yung6ix	5:56
9.	"Baby You (Oleku Remake)" (by Victoria Kimani)	Victoria Kimani	4:46
10.	"Onyenekwu [Remix] featuring Ice Prince" (by Tekno)	Tekno
11.	"Oleku Cover" (by Eddie Kadi)	Eddie Kadi
12.	"Change Your Love (Oleku Cover)" (by Sarkodie featuring Mohammed)	Sarkodie and Mohammed	3:19
