= Fire of Zamani =

Studio album by Ice Prince
- Released: October 28, 2013
- Recorded: 2012–2013
- Genre: Hip hop; Afrobeats; dancehall; reggae; highlife
- Length: 61:00
- Label: Chocolate City
- Producer: Chopstix; Don Jazzy; Jay Sleek; Sammy Gyang; E-Kelly

Ice Prince chronology
Everybody Loves Ice Prince (2011)	Fire of Zamani (2013)	Trash Can (2015)

Singles from Fire of Zamani
- 1. "Aboki" Released: August 28, 2012; 2. "More" Released: August 28, 2012; 3. "Gimme Dat" Released: April 24, 2013; 4. "I Swear" Released: September 9, 2013

Fire of Zamani (abbreviated as FOZ) is the second studio album by Nigerian rapper Ice Prince. Sean Stan of Vintage Sounds Production mastered the album before Chocolate City released it on October 28, 2013. Comprising eighteen tracks, Fire of Zamani features guest appearances from Sunny Neji, Wale, M.I, Chip, Ruby Gyang, Wizkid, French Montana, Jesse Jagz, Olamide, Sound Sultan, Burna Boy, Yung L, Jeremiah Gyang, Shaydee, and Morell. The album's production was primarily handled by Chopstix, a member of Grip Boiz City, along with additional production from Don Jazzy, Jay Sleek, Sammy Gyang, and E-Kelly.

Fire of Zamani was marketed to East Africans by the distribution platform Mdundo, and yielded the singles "Aboki", "More", "Gimme Dat", and "I Swear".

== Background and promotion ==
Ice Prince first announced the album's title while speaking with Toolz on Ndani TV's The Juice. He said he put everything into the record, working on it as if it were his first. Additionally, he claimed to have heard the term "Fire of Zamani" while listening to 2Face's album The Unstoppable. Originally slated for release on September 9, 2013, Fire of Zamani was meant to honor people who died in the 2001 Jos riots. On October 17, 2013, Ice Prince revealed the album's artwork as a collage consisting of small posters and released the track list four days later. Fire of Zamani is available on the Spinlet platform, a digital media library application similar to iTunes.

Chocolate City held an album launch concert on November 23, 2013, at the Eko Hotels and Suites' Expo Hall. The concert featured performances from Ice Prince, Chip, M.I Abaga, Don Jazzy, Olamide, Burna Boy, Sunny Neji, Yung L, Ruby, Morell, Jeremiah Gyang, DJ Caise and DJ Edu. Ice Prince hosted an album listening session at the Hilton Sandton in Johannesburg in December 2013. He gave a detailed account of each song on the album and signed autograph copies of the album for each guest. The event was hosted by South African rapper Da L.E.S.

== Singles and other releases ==
The album's lead single "Aboki", which translates to Friend in Hausa, was released on August 28, 2012. The song was produced by Chopstix and celebrates some of the most successful individuals from Northern Nigeria. The music video for "Aboki" was directed by Phil Lee and filmed in Los Angeles.

The album's second single, "More", was also released on August 28. Its music video was recorded in London by Moe Musa. British-Nigerian singer Lola Rae played Ice Prince's love interest in the video. "Gimme Dat" was released as the album's third single on April 23, 2013. The song was also produced by Chopstix and features vocals by Yung L, Burna Boy and Olamide. An alternative version of the song, featuring Wande Coal, surfaced on the internet after the release of the official version. The French Montana and Shaydee-assisted track "I Swear" was released on September 9, 2013, as the album's fourth single. The music video for the song was filmed in the U.S by J.R Saint.

On February 20, 2014, Ice Prince premiered the Sesan-directed music video for "Jambo". On May 28, 2014, he released the music video for "Whiskey", which was directed by Aje Filmworks and features cameo appearances from Sunny Nneji and DJ Caise. In an interview with MTV UK in April 2014, Ice Prince said he would release the music video for "Mercy", a song that includes a rap verse by British rapper Chip. On August 6, 2014, Ice Prince released a video for the AKA-assisted remix of "N Word".

== Critical reception ==
Professional ratings
Review scores
Source	Rating
Nigerian Entertainment Today	2.5/5 stars
9jaNinja	4.8/10

Fire of Zamani received mixed reviews from music critics. Reviewing for YNaija, Wilfred Okiche characterized the album as "easily accessible and ridiculously catchy" and said it "shines as bright as Ice wants it to". In a negative review, Ayomide Tayo of Nigerian Entertainment Today gave the album 2.5 stars out of 5, saying the "lack of a solid theme running through the LP makes the whole project sound all over the place." Toye Trill of 9jaNinja granted the album a rating of 4.8 out of 10, saying "there were so much reggae infusion into Ice's verses, that lyrically only few songs didn't have evidence of Ice Prince's inner rasta man, for a supposed rap album."

=== Accolades ===
Fire of Zamani was nominated for Rap Album of the Year at the 2014 City People Entertainment Awards.

== Track listing ==
No.	Title	Writer(s)	Producer(s)	Length
1.	"Stars and Light" (featuring Ruby Gyang)	Panshak Zamani; Ruby Gyang	Sammy Gyang	5:22
2.	"Skit by MC Longs"	MC Longs	—	0:52
3.	"Aboki"	Zamani	Chopstix	3:07
4.	"My Life"	Zamani	Sammy Gyang	4:52
5.	"Mercy" (featuring Chip)	Zamani; Jahmaal Bailey	Chopstix	4:03
6.	"Whiskey" (featuring Sunny Nneji)	Zamani; Sunny Nneji	Sammy Gyang	4:52
7.	"N Word"	Zamani	Don Jazzy	3:45
8.	"Tipsy" (featuring Wale and Morell)	Zamani; Olubowale Akintimehin; Morell	Chopstix	3:37
9.	"Jambo"	Zamani	Chopstix	3:32
10.	"No Die Tomorrow"	Zamani	Sammy Gyang	4:00
11.	"Gimme Dat" (featuring Yung L, Burna Boy, and Olamide)	Zamani; Yung L; Damini Ogulu; Olamide Adedeji	Chopstix	4:51
12.	"Komotion" (featuring Wizkid)	Zamani; Ayodeji Balogun	Chopstix	3:30
13.	"I Swear" (featuring French Montana and Shaydee)	Zamani; Karim Kharbouch	Chopstix	3:39
14.	"Person Wey Sabi"	Zamani	Chopstix	4:52
15.	"Kpako" (featuring M.I and Jesse Jagz)	Zamani; Jude Abaga; Jesse Garba Abaga	Chopstix	4:31
16.	"Pray" (featuring Sound Sultan)	Zamani; Olanrewaju Fasasi	Chopstix	3:55
17.	"More"	Zamani	Chopstix	4:26
18.	"On My Knees" (featuring Jeremiah Gyang)	Zamani; Jeremiah Gyang	Sammy Gyang	5:22
Total length:				61:00

Notes

- "—" denotes a skit

== Personnel ==
The following people contributed to Fire of Zamani:

- Audu Maikori – executive producer
- Paul Okeugo – executive producer
- Yahaya Maikori – executive producer
- Panshak Zamani – primary artist, writer
- Olubowale Victor Akintimehin – featured artist, writer
- Sunny Nneji – featured artist
- Jude Abaga – executive producer, featured artist, writer
- Jahmaal Bailey – featured artist, writer
- Ruby Gyang – featured artist, writer
- Ayodeji Balogun – featured artist, writer
- Karim Kharbouch – featured artist, writer
- Olamide Adedeji – featured artist, writer
- Olanrewaju Fasasi – featured artist, writer
- Damini Ogulu – featured artist, writer
- Yung L – featured artist, writer
- Jeremiah Gyang – featured artist, writer
- Shaydee – featured artist, writer
- Morell – featured artist, writer
- Chopstix – mixer, producer
- Michael Collins Ajereh – producer
- Jay Sleek – producer
- Sammy Gyang – mixer, producer
- E-Kelly – producer
- Sean Stan – mastering

== Release history ==
Region	Date	Format	Label
Nigeria	October 28, 2013	CD, Digital download	Chocolate City Music Label
