= Superstar (Ice Prince song) =

Single by Ice Prince

from the album Everybody Loves Ice Prince
- Released: April 22, 2011
- Recorded: 2010
- Genre: Hip hop, Naija
- Length: 4:18
- Label: Chocolate City
- Songwriter(s): Panshak Zamani
- Producer(s): Jesse Jagz

Ice Prince singles chronology
"Oleku" (2010)	"Superstar" (2011)	"Juju" (2012)

"Superstar" is a song by Nigerian recording artist Ice Prince, released by Chocolate City on April 22, 2011. It is the second single from the rapper's debut studio album, Everybody Loves Ice Prince (2011). The song reached number 1 on charts across Nigeria and the continent, but did not achieve the same level of astronomical popularity that its predecessor "Oleku" had. Even so, many observers of the music industry noted the song as one of the most notable Nigerian songs of 2011.

== Music video and accolades ==
"Superstar" is a club and radio friendly song about being rich and famous. The music video was released on 2 August 2011; it won the Most Gifted Hip-hop Video of the Year award at the 2012 Channel O Music Video Awards.

Year	Awards ceremony	Award description(s)	Results
2012	Channel O Music Video Awards	Most Gifted Hip-hop Video of the Year	Won

== Track listing ==
Digital single

No.	Title	Writer(s)	Producer(s)	Length
1.	"Superstar"	Panshak Zamani	Jesse Abaga	4:18

== Release history ==
Region	Date	Format	Label
Nigeria	April 22, 2011	CD, Digital download	Chocolate City
