= I Swear (Ice Prince song) =

Single by Ice Prince featuring French Montana and Shaydee

from the album Fire of Zamani
- Released: September 9, 2013
- Recorded: 2013
- Genre: Hip hop, African hip hop
- Length: 3:59
- Label: Chocolate City
- Songwriters: Panshak Zamani; Karim Kharbouch
- Producer: Chopstix

Ice Prince singles chronology
"V.I.P" (2013)	"I Swear" (2013)	"Shots on Shots" (2014)

French Montana singles chronology
"Shisha" (2013)	"I Swear" (2013)	"Feelin' Myself" (2013)

Music video
- "I Swear" on YouTube

"I Swear" is a song by Nigerian rapper Ice Prince. It was released as the fourth single from his second studio album, Fire of Zamani (2013). American rapper French Montana contributes a rap verse to it, and Nigerian singer Shaydee provides guest vocals. The song was produced by Chopstix and released by Chocolate City. It debuted at number ten on MTV Base's Official Naija Top 10 chart.

== Background and recording ==
"I Swear" was recorded in Nigeria except for French Montana's part, which was recorded at Big Daddy's Studio in New York City. On September 7, 2013, Ice Prince uploaded a video to YouTube highlighting he and Montana's studio session.

In an interview with HipTV, Ice Prince elaborated on his collaboration with French Montana, saying, "I got introduced to him by a Nigerian guy. We just got introduced backstage at his show and he said this cat's cool. From then on, we went together, we got in the studio, recorded the song".

== Music video ==
The music video for "I Swear" was filmed in the United States by J R Saint. It was released on October 8, 2013, a month after the audio release.

== Critical reception ==
"I Swear" received positive reviews from music critics. Ogagus, writing a review for Jaguda.com, called the song a "groovy rap tune" and said Ice Prince "can hold his own with the best of them when it comes to rap globally." Reviewing for The Guardian newspaper, Phiona Okumu praised Ice Prince for "trading rhymes" with French Montana. OkayAfrica commended both rappers for "namedropping and channeling some of their contemporaries over a syncopated beat".

== Release history ==
Region	Date	Format	Label
Nigeria	September 9, 2013	CD, Digital download	Chocolate City Music
