= Trash Can (EP) =

EP by Ice Prince
- Released: 29 January 2015
- Recorded: 2013–2015
- Genres: Hip Hop; Afrobeats
- Length: 25:40
- Label: Chocolate City Music
- Producers: TMXO; Drey Beatz; City Monstar; T Sleek

Ice Prince chronology
Fire of Zamani (2013)	Trash Can (2015)	The Indestructible Choc Boi Nation (2015)

Trash Can (stylized as Trash Can - EP) is an extended play by Nigerian rapper Ice Prince. It was released for free digital download by Chocolate City on January 29, 2015. Ice Prince enlisted TMXO, City Monstar, Drey Beatz, and T Sleek to produce the EP. Trash Can comprises six songs and features a guest appearance from Joules Da Kid.

== Track listing ==
All tracks are written by Ice Prince Zamani except where there is a feature.

No.	Title	producer(s)	Length
1.	"Confess"	City Monstar	4:26
2.	"Marry You"	Drey Beatz	3:54
3.	"Nobody"	TMXO	3:42
4.	"Mutumina"	TMXO	3:54
5.	"Elegushi" (featuring Joules Da Kid)	T Sleek	4:18
6.	"One Day"	TMXO	3:38
Total length:			25:40

== Personnel ==
- Ice Prince Zamani - Primary artist
- Joules Da Kid - Featured artist
- TMXO - Production
- Drey Beatz - Production
- T Sleek - Production
- City Monstar - Production
