= Aboki (song) =

2012 single by Ice Prince

Single by Ice Prince

from the album Fire of Zamani
- Released: 28 August 2012
- Recorded: 2013
- Genre: Hip hop
- Length: 3:07
- Label: Chocolate City
- Songwriter: Panshak Zamani
- Producer: Chopstix

Ice Prince singles chronology
"Ma'Gyptian (Magician Remix)" (2012)	"Aboki" (2012)	"More" (2012)

Music video
- "Aboki" on YouTube

"Aboki" (Hausa: "Friend") is a song by Nigerian rapper Ice Prince, released on 28 August 2012. It serves as the lead single from his second studio album, Fire of Zamani (2013). The song was produced by Chopstix and released along with "More". It peaked at number 92 on Afribiz's Top 100 chart.

== Meaning ==
According to the website Nigerian Sounds, "Aboki" translates to friend in Hausa and celebrates some of the most successful people from Northern Nigeria. Commenting on the single, Ice Prince said, "I'm absolutely excited about my new project; I feel it shows my fans a different side to me. My whole approach to the music, the delivery, my thought process is different from how it was last year."

== Music video ==
The music video for "Aboki" was uploaded to YouTube on 1 October 2012, at a total length of 3 minutes and 42 seconds. It was directed by Phil Lee in Los Angeles. During the video shoot, Ice Prince was interviewed by one of his associates. Prior to releasing the music video, he uploaded a behind the scenes video of the interview to YouTube. In the video, Ice Prince talked about the meaning of "Aboki" and the overall message of his music.

== Accolades ==
"Aboki" was nominated for Most Gifted African West Video and Most Gifted Video of the Year at the 10th Annual Channel O Music Video Awards, which took place at the Walter Sisulu Square, in Kliptown, Soweto on 30 November 2013. Moreover, the music video was nominated for Best African Act Video at the 5th edition of the 4Syte TV Music Video Awards, held at the Accra International Conference Centre on 16 November 2013.

== Live performances ==
Ice Prince performed the song at the 2012 edition of the Koko Concert. He also performed the song at the finale of Big Brother Africa 8 on 25 August 2013. Moreover, he performed the song at the 2013 Star Trek concert in Nigeria. Furthermore, he performed the song during his tour of North America and visit to Zambia on Easter Weekend in 2013.

== Track listing ==
Digital single

No.	Title	Writer(s)	Producer(s)	Length
1.	"Aboki"	Panshak Zamani	Chopstix	3:40

== Aboki (Remix) ==
"Aboki Remix"

Remix by Ice Prince featuring Sarkodie, Mercy Johnson, Wizkid, M.I, and Khuli Chana
- Released: January 25, 2013
- Recorded: 2012
- Genre: Hip hop
- Length: 4:21
- Label: Chocolate City
- Songwriters: Panshak Zamani; Michael Addo; Ayodeji Balogun; Jude Abaga; Khulane Morule
- Producer: Chopstix

On 25 January 2013, Chocolate City released the alternative version of "Aboki", which features Sarkodie, Mercy Johnson, Wizkid, M.I, and Khuli Chana. The song was originally intended to be included on Ice Prince's second studio album Fire of Zamani (2013), but was ultimately removed from the final track list due to reasons that haven't been made public.

=== Background ===
In an interview with Toolz on NdaniTV's The Juice, Ice Prince described the song as the "biggest African collision ever". When asked about his decision to feature Mercy Johnson, he said, "When Sarkodie sent me the verse, he had a line that said 'Mercy Johnson, will you be my Wifey?' He wanted me to say 'Oh no Charly, she's married' and then he says 'okay, I see' and then continues his rap. For me to do it wouldn't have made sense, you know what I mean. I hit up Mercy Johnson...She sent me a voice note and I put it there." Ice Prince also said he had plans to shoot the music video for the remix. However, the music video was never shot.

=== Promotion ===
Ice Prince announced on Twitter that he would be featuring Johnson, along with the other artists. Charles Mgbolu of Vanguard said that "fans were anxious to listen to this remix not because of any doubt in the talent of Ice Prince to put together a solid collaboration; rather expectations peaked because Mercy Johnson was in the picture."

=== Critical reception ===
Upon release, the song was met with mixed reviews from music critics. Qazim Quedy of 360 Nobs commended everyone who worked on the song. Charles Mgbolu of Vanguard characterized the song as "a hot baked collaboration that further deepened Aboki's intensity and overall quality." On the contrary, those who opposed the song felt Mercy Johnson's involvement was unnecessary and thought she was being used as a mere stunt to add publicity to the song.

=== Track listing ===
Digital single

No.	Title	Writer(s)	Producer(s)	Length
1.	"Aboki (Remix)" (featuring Sarkodie, Mercy Johnson, Wizkid, M.I, and Khuli Chana)	Panshak Zamani, Michael Owusu Addo, Ayodeji Balogun, Jude Abaga, and Khuli Chana	Chopstix	4:21
