= DJ Caise =

- Born: Derin Phillips
- Citizenship: Nigeria
- Education: University of Reading, Point Blank Music College
- Occupations: Disc jockey, Radio personality, Record producer
- Years active: 2010–present
- Musical career
- Genres: african pop, hip-hop, R&B, funky house, old school, house music, afrobeats
- Instrument: Mixer
- Label: Chocolate City

Derin Phillips, better known as DJ Caise (pronounced as "Case"), is a Nigerian disc jockey.

== Life and music career ==
His maternal grandfather, the late Chief Antonio Deinde Fernandez, was a Nigerian business magnate, diplomat and Permanent Representative of Central African Republic to the United Nations. His mother is Chief Teju Phillips, a former commissioner of Lagos State.

Caise interest in music started during his time at University of Reading.

Caise was on "BBC Radio 1Xtra" with Mista Silva, C4 Pedro and Big Nelo. DJ Caise got signed to Chocolate City in 2011.

Caise is best known for hosting DJ Caise In The Mix, which has been held every friday night on The Beat 99.9 FM.

He attended the University of Reading, where he acquired a master's degree in finance, as well as a bachelor's degree in economics. He also studied at Point Blank Music College in Hoxton, North London, Los Angeles.

On November 30, 2015, DJ Caise announced the release of his debut album as May 2016.

In August 2016, DJ Caise was featured in Blanck Magazine.

In 2018, Caise married Xerona Duke, the eldest daughter of Donald and Onari Duke. Her father is the former governor of Cross River State, and her mother belongs to the aristocratic Bob-Manuel family of Abonnema, Rivers State.

== Tours ==
In 2011, the Hennessy artiste club tour took off with the likes of Praiz, DJ Caise, DJ Spinall, Slyde, Bizzle, and Sammy.

He performed at MTV, BET, twice at Big Brother Africa, as well as headlined festivals in Kenya and Cardiff, Wales.

== Notable performances ==
He has performed in several popular events and shows since he rise to stardom, performed in events like:

Event	Year
"MTV Africa Music Awards"	2010
"Soundcity Music Video Awards	2010
"In house Dj Big Brother Africa"	2010
"Big Brother Africa"	2011
"Everybody Loves Ice Prince album lunch"	2011
"Music Meets Runway"	2011
"BET Awards 2013"	2013
"Boombaataa festival"	2013
"Mtv African All Stars concert"	2013
"World Music Expo"	2013
"Harp Rhythm Unplugged"	2013
"Gidi Culture Festival"	2014
"Nigerian Idol eviction party for Obed"	2014
"MTV Africa Music Awards gig"	2015
"On Tour with MTV Shuga"	2015
"Nigeria Entertainment Conference"	2016
"Glo Naija Sings Winners Party"	
"Governor's Independence Day Ball"
"The Christian Audigier Wine"
"Champagne Launch (lagos)"

== Discography ==
Singles

- "Shake Bodi remix" (ft. Eldee, Jesse Jagz & Grip Boiz)" (2011)
- "Number One" (feat. Waje) (2012)
- "Buckle Up" (feat. Emmy Ace) (2014)
- "Crush" (feat. Ice Prince) (2014)
- " Psycho Music" (feat. Uzi) (2014)
- "Lights" (feat. Ice Prince) (2015)

Mixtapes

Mixtape's	Year
"Sound Of South Africa Mix Reloaded Mix"	2012
"DJ Caise House Friday"	2012
"Don't Dull Remix (Wizkid)"	2012
"Flashback vs Implication (2Face)"	2012
"Without You vs Kukere (Iyanya/Usher)"	2012
"Bashment Mix"	2013
"Afrobeats Mix"	2013
"Sounds Of Ghana Mix"	2013
"Gaga Titanium (Chuddy K/Sia & David Guetta)"	2013
"Chocolate City New Year Mix"	2015
"Skin tight (House remix)"	2016

Compilation albums

- The Indestructible Choc Boi Nation with Chocolate City (2015)

== Awards and nominations ==
Year	Awards ceremony	Award description(s)	Recipient	Results	Ref
2010	Dynamix Youth Awards	Dj Of The Year	Himself	Won	
2011	Nigeria Entertainment Awards	Best World DJ	Himself	Nominated	
2011	Fab Awards	Dj Of The Year	Himself	Won	
2012	Nigerian Broadcasters Merit Awards	Most Popular In-House D.J (Radio)	Himself (The Beat 99.9 FM)	Won	
2012	Young Entertainers & Music Awards	Best Radio DJ Of The Year (Male/Female)	Himself (The Beat 99.9 FM)	Nominated	
2013	African Global DJ Awards	Best Radio DJ	Himself (The Beat 99.9 FM)	Nominated	
2013	African Global DJ Awards	Best Afro Hip pop/Hip Hop Music DJ	Himself (The Beat 99.9 FM)	Nominated	
2013	African Global DJ Awards	Best Western African DJ	Himself (The Beat 99.9 FM)	Nominated	
2013	Chase Awards	Best Radio Dj Of The Year (Male/Female)	Himself (The Beat 99.9 FM)	Nominated	

== See also ==
- List of Nigerian DJs
