= Koker (singer) =

Nigerian singer and songwriter (born 1993)

- Also known as: Koke Boy
- Born: Olayiwola Olabanji Kokumo; 30 May 1993 (age 33); Lagos State, Nigeria
- Origin: Ogun State, Nigeria
- Genres: Afro-pop; Fuji; Afrobeats
- Occupations: Singer; Songwriter
- Years active: 2015–present
- Label: Chocolate City

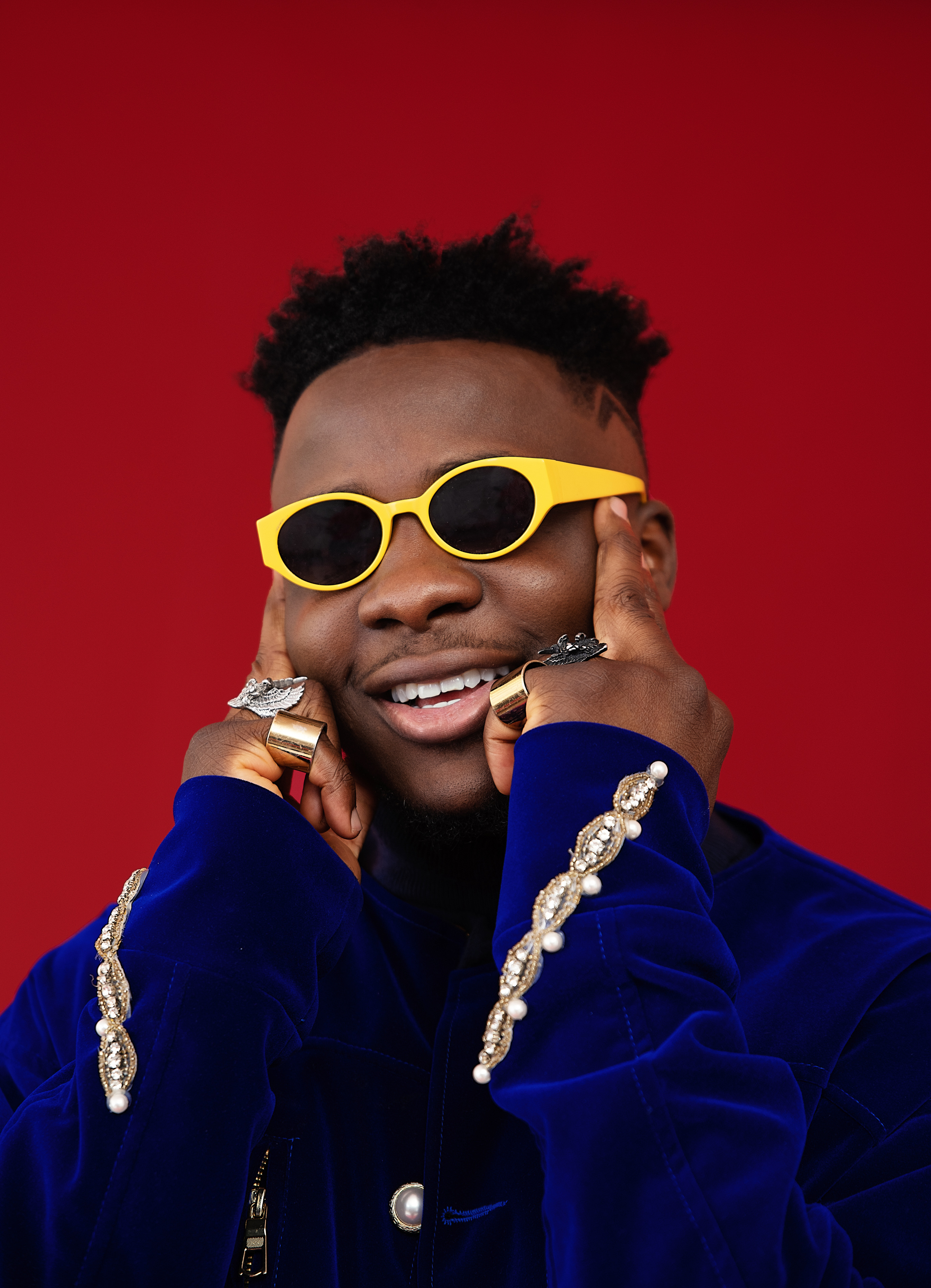
Koker, a Nigerian Afro-pop singer and songwriter

Olayiwola Olabanji Kokumo (born 30 May 1993), professionally known as Koker, is a Nigerian singer and songwriter. He rose to prominence after releasing the singles Do Something and Kolewerk, and later signed a recording contract with Chocolate City. His music combines Afro-pop, Fuji and contemporary Afrobeats influences.

== Early life and education ==
Koker was born on 30 May 1993 in Lagos State and is originally from Ogun State. He obtained a master's degree in Creative Arts from the University of Lagos.

== Career ==
Koker began his professional music career in 2015 with the release of Do Something. The song attracted attention within the Nigerian music industry and led to his signing with Chocolate City.

Later in 2015 he appeared on Chocolate City's compilation album The Indestructible Choc Boi Nation, alongside artists including M.I Abaga, Ice Prince, Loose Kaynon, Ruby Gyang and Dice Ailes.

His breakthrough single Kolewerk became one of the most played Nigerian songs of 2016 and earned him nominations at The Headies and the TooXclusive Awards. He subsequently released songs including Give Them, Bokiniyen, Too Late, Daddy featuring Falz, and Happy.

In 2016, Koker signed an endorsement agreement with Cloud 9 Music Streaming.

== Musical style ==
Koker's music incorporates elements of Afro-pop, Fuji and Afrobeats. He has cited King Sunny Adé, Sir Shina Peters and Ebenezer Obey as major musical influences.

== Discography ==
=== Compilation albums ===
- The Indestructible Choc Boi Nation (2015)

=== Selected singles ===
- "Do Something" (2015)
- "Kolewerk" (2016)
- "Kolewerk" (Remix) (featuring Olamide)
- "Give Them"
- "Bokiniyen"
- "Too Late"
- "Daddy" (featuring Falz)
- "Happy"

== Awards and nominations ==
Koker has received nominations from:

- The Headies
- TooXclusive Awards
- Top Naija Music Awards

== See also ==
- Chocolate City
- Afrobeats
- List of Nigerian musicians
