= Jeremiah Gyang =

Nigerian singer and record producer (born 1981)

- Born: 13 October 1981 (age 44); Jos, Plateau State, Nigeria

Jeremiah Pam Gyang (born 13 October 1981) is a Nigerian singer-songwriter, instrumentalist and record producer. Many regarded him as a Wunderkind playing both the piano and guitar before the age of ten. He is often credited as being responsible for bringing contemporary Hausa music to the mainstream of the Nigerian industry in 2004 with the popular hit ‘Na Ba Ka’ (I give you).

== Music career ==
Jeremiah worked in the Sheraton Hotels and Towers in Abuja for three years as a keyboardist, percussionist and vocalist. He left thereafter to join Quest Media Studios in 2002, where he worked for two years as a songwriter and producer.

== Discography ==
Studio albums
Title	Album details
NA BA KA	Released: 2005; Label: Chocolate City; Formats: CD, Music download|digital download
The Christmas Singles	Released: 10 August 2006; Label: Jeremiah Gyang; Formats: CD, Music download|digital download
The Love ALbum	Released: 14 October 2012; Label: Jeremiah Gyang; Formats: CD, Music download|digital download

== Early life ==
Jeremiah was born in Jos, Plateau State. His father late Rev. Luke Dung Gyang was a reverend and well known musician in Jos in the 1970s and 1980.

Jeremiah attended Boys secondary school, Gindiri from 1992 and was in yellow house. He was always seen with his guitar and performed special numbers on Sundays during service. He left B.S.S after his JSS 1.

== Personal life ==
On 28 August 2010, Jeremiah married his longtime love Ladi Otache in Jos. Jeremiah and Ladi live together and have two daughters.

== See also ==
- List of Nigerian gospel musicians
