= Yung6ix =

Nigerian rapper (born 1989)

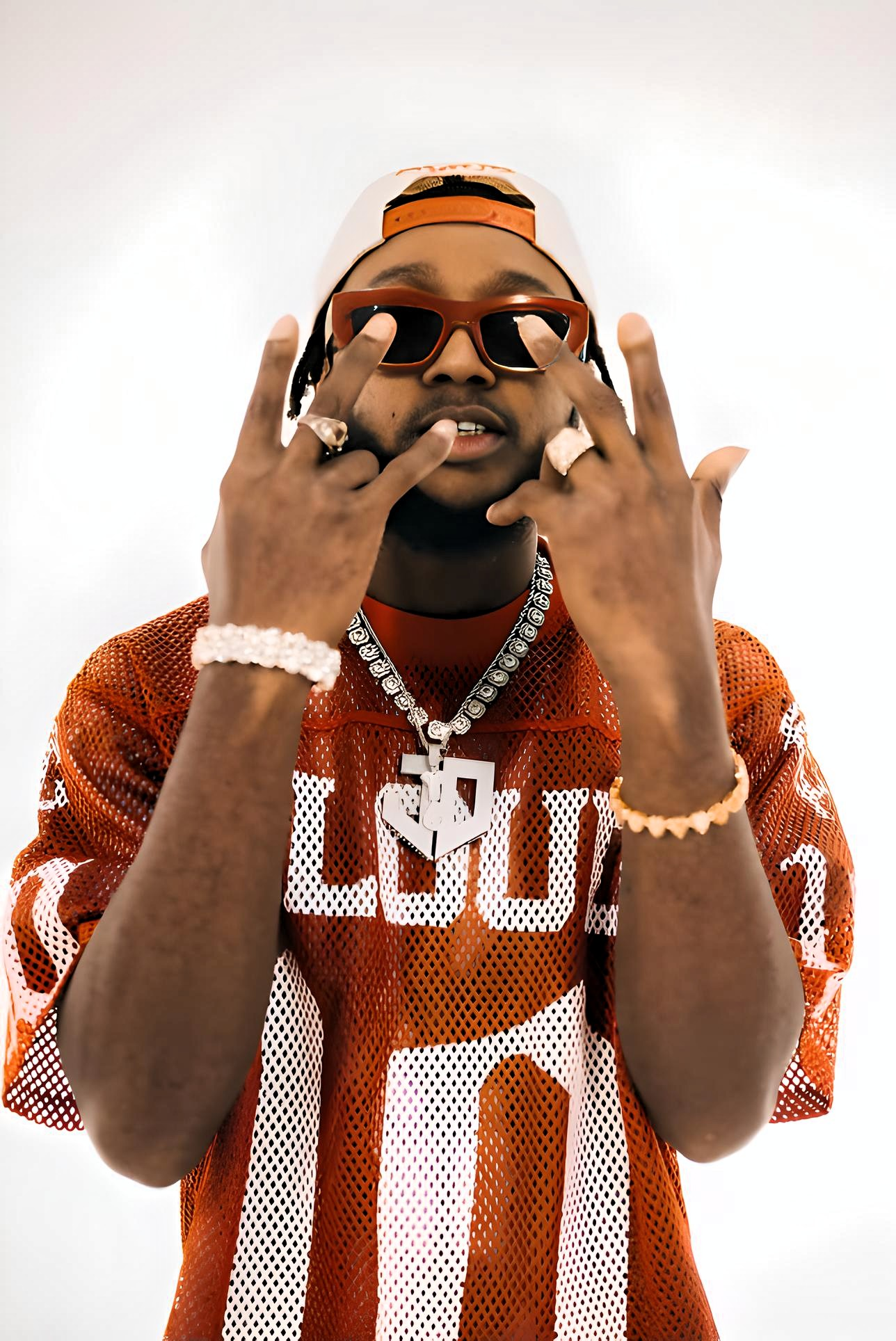
- Yung6ix in 2024

Background information
- Also known as: 6ix, King of the South (K.O.S), Swaggalomor
- Born: Onome Onokohwomo; 8 July 1989 (age 37); Warri, Delta State, Nigeria
- Origin: Ughelli North, Delta State
- Genre: Hip hop
- Occupation: Rapper
- Years active: 2009–present
- Label: Kash Kamp / Trick Billionaire MusiQ

Onome Onokohwomo (born 8 July 1989), better known by his stage name Yung6ix, is a Nigerian rapper.

== Biography ==
=== History ===
Onokohwomo was born and raised in Warri, Delta State. He grew up as the oldest child in a family of five, and took a strong interest in music at a young age. While a student at FGC Warri, he engaged in rap battles and developed a friendlier relationship with like-minded students, which led to the formation of the hip hop group G-Squad. The group soon began performing at various talent shows in Delta State. Music remained their unmatched and true passion. In a 2012 interview with Thisday news, Yung6ix recalled, "My love for music was so deep and I just kept on going till it got to a level they had to accept me for who I am. Funny though, the first song I recorded at school was used with my WAEC lesson fee to pay for the instrumentals and remember always having to trek from school to studio for close to 2 hours or more. It was really tough back then at school too as we weren't allowed to do our thing like we would love to but our passion just kept us going stronger & tougher."

After graduating from high school, Onokohwomo relocated to western Nigeria to pursue a career in music and enrolled at Oduduwa University. He derived his stage name Yung6ix from his high school nickname "6ixty". Shortly after he moved to Lagos, he continued to record music; his song "I'm an African" captured the attention of A&R Gbemi Ereku, who signed him to his 411 Entertainment Company in 2009. By 2010, he began to attract media attention after his cover version of "Oleku" went viral on the internet. He later released "So Far Gone", featuring P. Fizzy, a single off his Green Light Green mixtape. The song was a freestyle to Wiz Khalifa's "This Plane". In January 2011, 6ix released "Plenty Money", another track from the mixtape; an accompanying music video was released shortly after. The song made its official Nigerian radio premiere on the Beat 99.9 FM.

On 2 April 2011, Vanguard announced that 411 Entertainment had signed a joint-venture deal with Storm Records. The partnership would help improve Yung6ix's music career. Yung6ix collaborated with Wizkid on "Follow Me", a track from his debut studio album. Following the release of the song, an accompanying music video was filmed; it was directed by Bobby Boulders. In September 2011, Yung6ix released the fourth track from his Green Light Green project, "Oh My Gosh", which earned him both "Lyricist on the Roll" and "Best Rap Single" nominations at the Headies Awards the following year.

Green Light Green was originally slated for an April 2011 release; however, it was finally released on 26 December 2011. The music video for "Oh My Gosh", which was directed by Bobby Boulders, was released in January 2012. It was filmed in Lagos and Johannesburg, with cameo appearances by Naeto C, Jesse Jagz, DJ Neptune, and P. Fizzy. Yung6ix was among the rappers featured on M.I's Illegal Music 2; M.I subsequently co-signed and nicknamed him the "King of the South". In May 2012, "Picking Things", the second single from his debut album was released. The song features fellow ex-label mates Naeto C and E. Kelly. The next month, in an interview with blogger Ogaga Sakpaide, Yung6ix revealed the album's title to be 6ix 'O Clock. He also received a nomination for the "Most Promising Act" at the 2012 Nigeria Entertainment Awards, but lost to Eva Alordiah.

In 2013, Yung6ix floated his imprint "Kash Kamp" which houses Percy as well as talented producer Otee Beatz. On 4 September 2013, Yung6ix's camp welcomed a hand offered from "Trick Billionaire MusiQ" for both parties to partner with the end-result of taking Yung6ix and his brand out of Africa and sharing his brilliance with the rest of the world. Yung6ix collaborated with Percy on "First Class", the third single from his album. He also released a music video for the song which earned him a "Best Hip Hop Video" nomination at the 2013 Nigerian Music Video Awards. 6ix's debut full-length studio album, 6ix O Clock, was eventually released on 6 February 2014. The 16-track album features guest appearances from Phyno, Percy, Da L.E.S, M.I, Ice Prince, Yemi Alade, YQ, and Wizkid.

On 11 August 2019, Yung6ix was signed as the first Ambassador to the fast growing e-commerce firm Patricia, one of the largest traders of Bitcoin and gift cards in West Africa.

He escaped a gunshot by his friend in 2017. The reason, according to him being because he was not available for the music video of a song he was featured in by the same friend. The matter was reported to the police and the friend was arrested.

== Awards and nominations ==
Year	Event	Prize	Nominated work	Result	Ref
2012	Nigeria Entertainment Awards	Most Promising Act		Nominated	
2012	The Headies 2012	Best Rap Single	Oh My Gosh	Nominated	
2012	The Headies 2012	Lyricist on the Roll	Oh My Gosh	Nominated	
2013	Nigeria Music Video Awards	Best Hip hop Video	First Class	Nominated	
2013	Abuja Music and Meritorious Award	National Act of the Year		Won	

== Discography ==
=== Mixtapes ===
List of mixtapes, with selected details
Title	Details
Green Light Green	Release: 26 December 2011; Label: 411 Entertainment/Storm Records; Format: Digital download

=== Studio albums ===
List of studio albums, with selected details
Title	Details
6ix O'Clock	Release: 6 February 2014; Label: Kash Kamp / Trick Billionaire MusiQ; Format: CD, digital download; Release: 24 November 2017; Label: KashKamp/Trick Billionaire Music (KKTBM)

== Videography ==
Year	Title	Director	Ref
2016	"This Year"	—N/a	
