= African Knockout =

Mixed martial arts promotion

- Industry: Mixed martial arts
- Founded: October 2020
- Headquarters: Lagos, Nigeria,
- Key people: Kamaru Usman; Rayan Fayad; Natalia Belousova
- Website: https://ako.show

The African Knockout (AKO) is a pan-African professional Mixed Martial Arts (MMA) promotion, serving the Nigerian and African audience. AKO was founded in October 2020 in Lagos, Nigeria and, in 2021, the first African-born UFC World Champion, Kamaru “The Nigerian Nightmare” Usman joined the company.

The promotion started off in 2020 as an MMA talent reality TV Show called "African Knockout", becoming the first non-scripted sports reality show on Netflix in the process. The promotion continued with a series of fight events titled "FaceOff" Fight Nights in 2022, before ultimately launching the “AKO Championship” in 2023, with 5 weight divisions gathering athletes from 14 countries across Africa. AKO is governed by the Unified Rules of Mixed Martial Arts.

== AKO Show ==
The African KnockOut (AKO) Show Season 1 was launched in November 2020 on DStv SuperSport and GoTv Channels, and was promoted as the first-ever Nigerian MMA show and then became the first non-scripted reality show in Netflix history. The show featured 14 amateur fighters from all over Nigeria divided into two teams “White Wolves” and “Team Steal”. For 9 weeks, the fighters lived together in a closed training camp in Landmark, Lagos, and were documented going through martial arts training, team challenges, as well as sharing personal stories. The show was hosted by Okey Bakassi and had appearances from a number of celebrities such as comedian Basket Mouth, rapper MI Abaga and others in the camp.

The show's theme song, eponymously titled African Knockout was produced by Chocolate City and performed by musician MI Abaga. The Season 1 Grand Finale took place in December 2020 at the Landmark Event Centre in Lagos, Nigeria, where Ndidi "The Rage" Alonu became the ultimate winner of the Show, with Daniel "The Big Shark" Emeka and Segun "The Machine Gun Shegz" Ogunnoiki serving as first and second runner-up respectively.

== Events ==
Event title	Date	Venue	Location
AKO Championship 5	August 31, 2024	Abuja Continental Hotel	Abuja, Nigeria
AKO Championship 4	June 15, 2024	Abuja Continental Hotel	Abuja, Nigeria
AKO Championship 3	March 2, 2024	Sol by Boxmall	Lagos, Nigeria
AKO Championship 2	August 19, 2023	Goodbeach	Lagos, Nigeria
AKO Championship 1	May 12, 2023	Sol by Boxmall	Lagos, Nigeria
Face-Off Fight Night 3	December 29, 2022	Landmark Event Centre	Lagos, Nigeria
Face-Off Fight Night 2	March 18, 2022	EKO Event Centre	Lagos, Nigeria
Face-Off Fight Night 1	January 7, 2022	Lagos Continental Hotel	Lagos, Nigeria

== Broadcasters ==
DStv SuperSport, GoTV, and Netflix (AKO Show).

== See also ==
- Wing Chun Foundation Lagos
- Nigerian Mixed Martial Arts Federation
