= Ruby Gyang =

Nigerian singer and songwriter

- Also known as: Ruby Gyang
- Born: Ngohide Ruby Ann GyangGyang; Jos, Plateau State
- Origin: Plateau State
- Genres: Soul, R&B
- Occupations: Singer, songwriter
- Label: Chocolate City Music

Ngohide Ruby Ann GyangGyang, better known by her stage name Ruby Gyang, is a Nigerian singer and songwriter. She was formerly signed to Chocolate City.

== Life and career ==
Ruby Gyang was born in Jos, Plateau State, where she spent her early years. Her journey to stardom begun when she formed Loopy Music alongside MI, Ice Prince and Jesse Jagz. Ruby Gyang has worked and collaborated with artists such as MI, Jesse Jagz, Show Dem Camp, Ice Prince and Bez. Ruby Gyang joined Chocolate City Music after Loopy Music's merger with Chocolate City Music in 2015. She has released an EP under the label.

== Discography ==
Studio albums

- This Is Love (2016)

=== Singles ===
- "Kale Ni"
- "Oh Holy Night"
- "Oya Dance"
- "Crushing"
- "Har Abada" (feat. Classiq and Kheengz)
