= Yung L =

Nigerian singer and songwriter

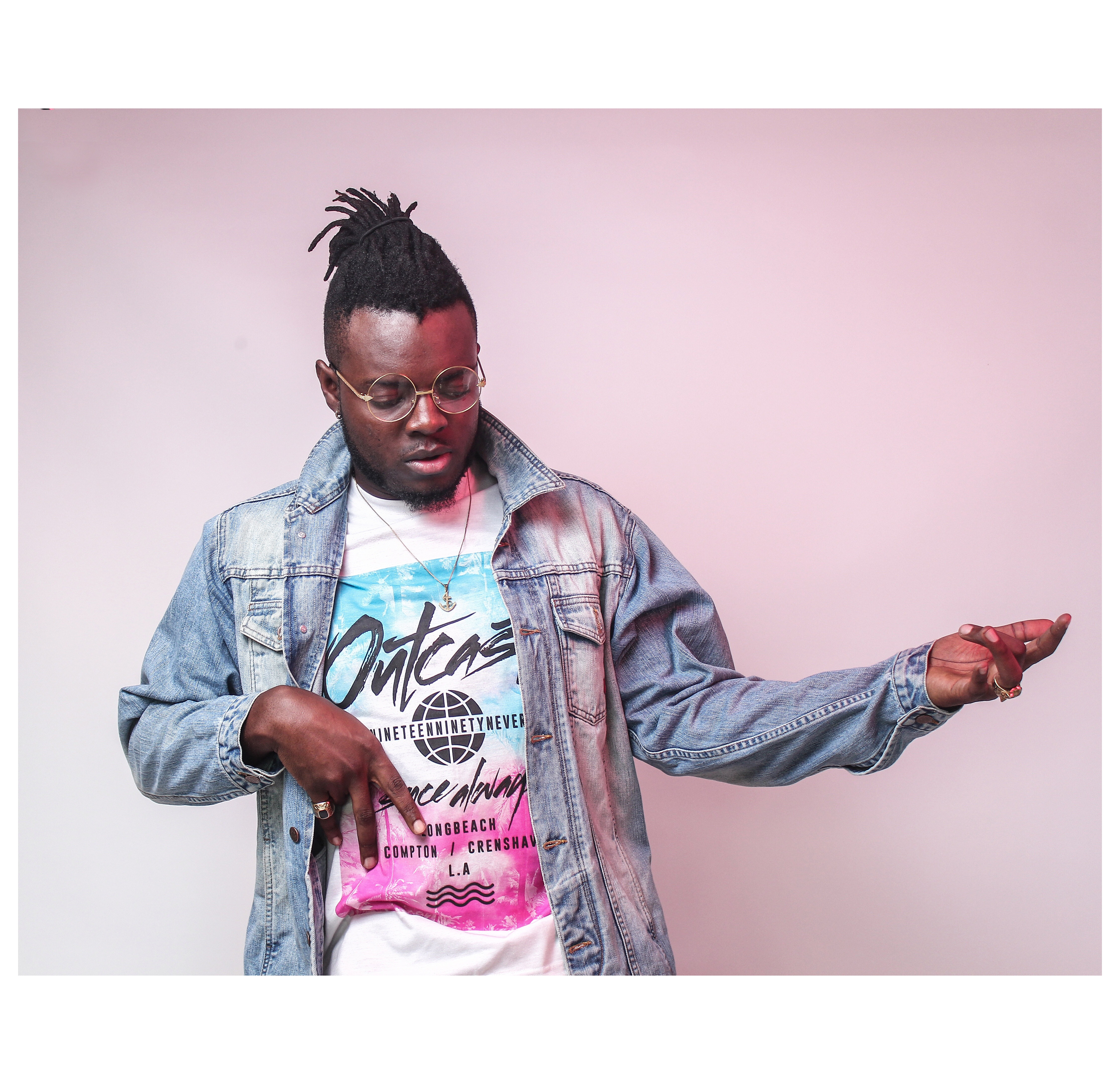
- Omenye in 2017

Background information
- Born: Christopher Omenye; Jos, Plateau State, Nigeria
- Genres: Reggae; Dancehall
- Years active: 2011–present
- Label: ChocolateCity Music

Christopher Omenye, professionally known as Yung L (pronounced Young L), is a Nigerian singer, songwriter, and performer.

== Early life ==
Yung L was born and raised in Jos, Plateau State. His mother greatly influenced his decision to become a musician, first by introducing him to the church drummer, and later, to the church pianist (Meca-E of Square Records). They both taught him the rudimentary aspects of music and how to play certain instruments. He soon began playing the drums in church, and Secondary School.

A graduate of the University of Jos, Omenye started singing, rapping, and performing at social events and joined a music group known as Mac9. They performed songs by some of Yung L’s musical influences such as Damian Marley and Jay-Z.

== Music career ==
While attending the University of Jos Medical School, Yung L met other budding musicians, such as Ice Prince (formerly), Endia, J.Milla, and Chopstix the producer. Together, they formed the GRIP movement, with Yung L acting as president of the Grip Music label. Grip music comprises individual artists Yung L, Endia, Jmilla, and chopstix, who are collectively known as the Grip Boiz- in the manner of the Choc Boys and WuTang Clan. In 2011, they moved to Lagos to pursue their music careers full-time.

Prior to signing his record deal with Chocolatecity Music, Yung L performed and released music as an independent artist. During this period, he released singles like Pass The Aux, SOS which was nominated for MTV’s Music Video of the Year Award In 2017, Yung L, Skales and producer Chopstix were featured by Major Lazer on the remix of "Run Up" which also features Nicki Minaj and PartyNextDoor, this gained him more international recognition.

With Chocolate City Music, he released singles and an album titled 'Better Late Than Never'. The album features the Ghanaian artist Sarkodie and others.

== Discography ==
- Better Late Than Never (2017)
- Jollification (EP) (2019)
- Juice & Zimm (EP) (2020)

=== Singles ===
- "SOS"
- "Fever"
- "Red Rose"
- "Cheers"
- "Gbewa"
- "Pressure" (featuring Sarkodie and Jaij Hollands)
- "Eve Bounce"
- "Eve Bounce remix" (featuring Wizkid)
