= Victoria Kimani =

Kenyan singer-songwriter (born 1985)

- Born: 28 July 1985 (age 41)
- Genre: Afropop
- Occupation: Singer
- Years active: 2009–present
- Label: Chocolate City (2013–2017)

Victoria Kimani (born 28 July 1985) is a Kenyan singer, songwriter, and entertainer formerly signed to Nigerian record label Chocolate City. Her debut album was released in 2016.

She has appeared in the film 7 Inch Curve.

== Life and career ==
Kimani attributes that she began her career doing back-ups for Mercy Myra. Due to it involving considerable travel, she later opted to drop out of school to fully pursue her music career.

Prior to the release of Russian rapper Timati's 2012 album Swagg, he and Kimani recorded a song entitled "Love to Love" (№9 in track listing).

In late 2012, she was the first female artist signed by the Chocolate City music label, releasing her first single under the label, "Mtoto", in March 2013. The video was shot in Los Angeles.

Between 2014 and 2016, Kimani released the single "Show", produced by singer and producer Tekno Miles and other singles such as; "Vex"; "Two of Dem"; "Loving You"; and "Booty Bounce", featuring Tanzanian artists Diamond Platnumz and Ommy Dimpoz; in 2016, Kimani released her new single "All the Way", featuring Khuli Chana.

On 13 May 2015, Kimani and seven African female musicians, Cobhams Asuquo and a team of One Campaign staff met in Johannesburg to create "Strong Girl". The song features singers Waje (Nigeria), Vanessa Mdee (Tanzania), Arielle T (Gabon), Gabriela (Mozambique), Yemi Alade (Nigeria), Selmor Mtukudzi (Zimbabwe), Judith Sephuma (South Africa), Blessing Nwafor (South Africa) and actress Omotola Jalade Ekeinde (Nigeria).

Kimani released the album Safari in December 2017, which collaborated with other African artists: Sarkodie, Khuli Chana, Jesse Jagz, Phyno, and Ice Prince.

In December 2017, in a radio interview with Adelle Onyango and Shaffie Weru, Kimani revealed that her contract with Chocolate City had expired, and felt it was time for her to be an independent artist.

== Discography ==
Studio albums

- Safari (2017)

== Awards and nominations ==
Year	Association	Award	Result	Ref(s)
2013	Channel O Music Video Awards	Most Gifted Newcomer Video	Nominated	
2013	Channel O Music Video Awards	Most Gifted R&B Video	Nominated	
2014	Africa Musik Magazine Awards	Best Female Artist (East Africa)	Nominated	
2015	Africa Musik Awards	Best Female Artist	Nominated	
2015	African Entertainment Awards USA	Best International Female Artist	Nominated	
2016	Kora Awards	Best Female Artist – East Africa	Nominated	
