= Chocolate City (record label) =

Nigerian record label

- Parent company: Chocolate City Group
- Founded: 2005
- Founder: Audu Maikori; Paul Okeugo; Yahaya Maikori
- Status: Active
- Genre: Various, with a focus on hip-hop
- Country of origin: Nigeria
- Location: Lagos; Abuja; Nairobi; New York City
- Official website: chocolatecitymusic.com

Chocolate City is a Nigerian record label founded in 2005 by lawyers Audu Maikori, Paul Okeugo, and Yahaya Maikori. Considered one of Nigeria's top record labels, Chocolate City operates as a subsidiary of Chocolate City Group. Other arms of the group include Chocolate City Distribution, Chocolate City Events, CCX, and Chocolate City Media. The label partnered with Warner Music Group (WMG) on 28 March 2019. Through WMG's independent division, ADA, Chocolate City artists will join WMG's catalog and benefit from the company's distribution and artist services.

The label is currently home to artists such as Young Jonn, Blaqbonez, Candy Bleakz, Tar1q, Major AJ, and Noon Dave. Artists formerly signed to the label include M.I Abaga, Ice Prince, Jesse Jagz, Brymo, Victoria Kimani, Nosa, DJ Caise, DJ Lambo, Jeremiah Gyang, Dice Ailes, Ruby Gyang, Koker, and Pryse, among others. Chocolate City has also worked on the careers of artists such as Djinee and Aṣa.

== History ==
Founded as a nightclub in 1997, Chocolate City quickly became the number one promotions outfit in the Northern part of Nigeria and moved into the industry mainstream in 2005 with the launch of the record label (Chocolate City Music). In 2001, Audu Maikori and Paul Okeugo founded the Guild of Artistes and Poets, called an "arts appreciation society" which held weekly meetings which focused on the arts, music, poetry and creativity as a means of youth engagement and empowerment.

Chocolate City went on to discover and manage the careers of Djinee, M.I, Aṣa, Jesse Jagz, Ice Prince, Brymo, and other artists who have won over 70 local and international awards. In June 2007, Audu Maikori won the British award for International Young Music Entrepreneur of the Year (IYMEY) by the British Council, making Nigeria the first country to win two global awards in the Young Creative Entrepreneurs Series (the first was Lanre Lawal (IYDEY) 2005), after beating nine countries including the Philippines, Latvia, Lithuania, Indonesia, India, Malaysia, Tanzania, Egypt and Poland.

Chocolate City was the first Nigerian music company to attain a global music award and recognition by the British Council in 2007: International Young Music Entrepreneur of the Year (IYMEY) 2007. Chocolate City has since worked closely with the federal government of Nigeria and several international organizations, such as the British Council, to promote creative industries and capacity-building projects in and around Nigeria. In April 2008, Chocolate City announced a major collaborative effort in partnership with the British Council and the Ministry of Culture and Tourism to take a delegation of Nigerian music stakeholders to London Calling 2008 in a bid to open new vistas for the fast-growing Nigerian music industry currently valued at around $500 Million (2007). The Minister of Culture and Tourism led the 40-man delegation.

In March 2019, Chocolate City signed a worldwide distribution deal with Warner Music Group. In April 2015, Maikori stepped down after ten years of piloting the affairs of the label and appointed M.I. to take over as the CEO of Chocolate City Music label while Ice Prince became the Vice President of Music for the label Maikori assumed the position of Group CEO of Chocolate City Group, which comprised Chocolate City Music (Record Label), Chocolate City Media, CCX Lounge (live music venue franchise), Bean Agency (an experiential marketing company), and Replete Publishing (A music publishing and distribution company). Paul Okeugo was also appointed Group COO for the group. In September 2019, M.I Abaga stepped down as CEO of Chocolate City Music. In April 2021, Abuchi Peter Ugwu was appointed as the label's CEO, succeeding Abaga.

The G.A.P later became one of the new age art renaissance movements, which quickly gained membership in Jos, Abuja, and Lagos with a combined membership of over 3000 attendees at its peak. The GAP brought to light the need for artists to have better representation, which Audu gave in the form of pro bono legal services, and this eventually led to his registering Chocolate City with his bonus earnings from his job as a lawyer with the chambers of Afe Babalola and co. The first act to be signed to the Chocolate City label was multi-talented instrumentalist, vocalist, songwriter, and producer Jeremiah Gyang (whose debut album Na BA KA sold over 4 Million copies and won numerous accolades and acclaim for the artist as well as the label).

Reuters International produced a documentary on the Chocolate City success story tagged "Music and Money" in recognition of its contributions to developing the Nigerian music industry. Over the years, Chocolate City has partnered with many international and regional creative industry organisations, with affiliates in South Africa, the U.K., and the US, the Ministry of Culture and Tourism, and the British Council toward promoting and celebrating creativity in Nigeria. On 8 December 2011, parent company Chocolate City Group won the African Awards for Entrepreneurship, beating over 3,300 applicants from 48 African countries to clinch the runner-up prize, making history as the first entertainment company to win the prize since 2007.

Under the leadership of MI, Chocolate City expanded by creating sub-labels that included 100 Crowns which discovered and signed Blaqbonez, and UpNorth Records, which signed Classiq and Dijay Cinch, it had its first-ever press conference where every artiste was present to answer questions from members of the press. The press conference was planned to be every month, but it only had been held once

=== Accolades ===
Year	Awards ceremony	Award description(s)	Results	Ref
2011	Africa Awards for Entrepreneurship	Finalist (Chocolate City Group)	Won	
2011	City People Entertainment Awards	Record Label of the Year	Won	
2013	City People Entertainment Awards	Record Label of the Year	Won	

== Artists ==
=== Current acts ===
Act	Year signed	Releases under the label	Ref
Nosa	2012	1	
Yung L	2017	1	
ClassiQ	2019	–	
Blaqbonez	2019	3	
Candy Bleakz	2020	2	
Young Jonn	2022	2	-
Major AJ	2022	4	
Noon Dave	2021	2	
Tar1q	2023	1	

=== Former acts ===
Act	Year signed	Year left	Releases under the label	Ref
Jeremiah Gyang	2005	2010	1	
M.I	2008	2020	8	
Jesse Jagz	2010	2013	1	
Jesse Jagz	2015	2017	1	
Ice Prince	2010	2016 (Note: Although Ice Prince's contract expired in 2013, he didn't publicly announce his exit from the label until 2016.)	3	
Brymo	2010	2013	1	
DJ Caise	2011	2017 (Note: While announcing his exit from Chocolate City, DJ Caise revealed that his deal with the label was basically a joint venture.)	0	
Pryse	2012	2016	0	
Victoria Kimani	2012	2017	2	
Nosa	2012		1	
Dice Ailes	2014	2021	–	
Milli	2015	2016	0	
Kahli Abdu & VHS Safari	2015	2016	0	
Koker	2015	2018	0	
DJ Lambo	2015	2019	0	
CKay	2016	2021	2	

== Discography ==
Year	Information	Ref
2005	Jeremiah Gyang - Na Ba Ka: Released: May 2005; Singles: "Na Ba Ka", "Wakar Najeriya", "Gonna Be", "Kasi Tala", "Ban Da Kai"	
2008	M.I - Talk About It: Released: 11 December 2008; Singles: "Safe", "Anoti", "Money", "Teaser", "Crowd Mentality", "Blaze", "Short Black Boy", "Talk About It"	
2010	Jesse Jagz - Jag of All Tradez: Released: 20 April 2010; Singles: "Wetin Dey", "Nobody Test Me", "Love You", "Pump it Up"	
2010	M.I - MI 2: Released: 23 November 2010; Singles: "Action Film", "Beef", "Undisputed", "Nobody"	
2011	Ice Prince - Everybody Loves Ice Prince: Released: 9 October 2011; Singles: "Superstar", "Oleku", "Juju"	
2012	Brymo - The Son of a Kapenta: Released: 15 November 2012; Singles: "Ara", "Good Morning", "Go Hard"	
2013	Victoria Kimani - Queen Victoria: Released:14 October 2013; Singles:	
2013	Ice Prince - Fire of Zamani: Released:28 October 2013; Singles: "I Swear", "Gimme Dat", "More", "Aboki"	
2014	Nosa - Open Doors: Released:14 March 2014; Singles: "Always Pray for You", "Why You Love Me"	
2014	M.I - The Chairman: Released: 30 October 2014; Singles: "Bad Belle", "Monkey", "Bullion Van"; Sales certification: 30,000 in pre-order sales	
2015	Ice Prince - Trash Can: Released: 29 January 2015; Singles: "Marry You"	
2015	Chocolate City - The Indestructible Choc Boi Nation: Released: 30 April 2015; Singles: "Summer Time", "Suite 99"	
2016	Ruby Gyang - This is Love: Released: 29 February 2016; Singles: "Shakara", "Good Man"	
2016	M.I - Illegal Music 3: Released: 29 February 2016; Singles: "Everything I Have Seen"	
2016	Victoria Kimani - Safari: Released: 5 December 2016; Singles: "Gota", "Giving You"	
2017	Yung L - Better Late Than Never: Released: 13 October 2017; Singles: "Gbewa", "Anya", "Pressure"	
2018	M.I - Rendezvous: Released: 9 February 2018; Singles: "Your Father", "Lekki"	
2018	M.I – A Study on Self Worth: Yxng Dxnzl: Released: 24 August 2018; Singles: "You Rappers Should Fix Up Your Lives"	
2018	Blaqbonez – Bad Boy Blaq (EP): Released: 31 October 2018; Singles: "Mamiwota"	
2019	CKay – CKay the First (EP): Released: 30 August 2019; Singles: "Way"	
2019	Street Billionaires - Street Born (EP): Released: 27 September 2019; Singles: "Yoruba Ni Mi"	
2019	Blaqbonez - Bad Boy Blaq Re-Up (EP): Released: 8 Feb 2019; Singles:	
2019	Blaqbonez - Mr. Boombastic: Released: 25 October 2019; Singles: "Shut Up", "Mr. Boombastic"	
2019	Nosa- Na Your Way: Released: Singles:	
2019	Candy Bleakz: Singles- "Owo Osu", "Virus"; Released: 31 May 2019	
2020	MI Abaga- The Live Report (EP): Released: 15 April 2020; African Knockout: Released: 23 October 2020	
	Nosa: Singles; -Dry Bones (13 March 2020): If God Be For Me (1 May 2020)	
	CkayLove Nwantintin remix (feat Joeboy, Kuami Eugene)	
	Candy Bleakz Kelegbe (17 April 2020) Won La (11 September 2020)	
2021	MI Abaga: Singles: "TBDK" (19 March 2021), "All My Life" (4 June 2021)	
	Blaqbonez- Sex Over Love: Released: 30 April 2021; Singles: Bling	
	Candy Bleakz- Singles Kope (19 March 2021)Baba Nla feat Teni (27 May 2021)	
2022	Young Jonn- Singles: Dada; Dada Remix feat Davido (28 April 2022); Normally; Xtra Cool; EP: Love Is Not Enough; Love Is Not Enough Vol 2	
	Candy Bleakz "Tikuku" (single)- Released 29 April 2022 FIRE EP - Released 24 June 2022	
