= Ice Prince =

Nigerian rapper (born 1986)

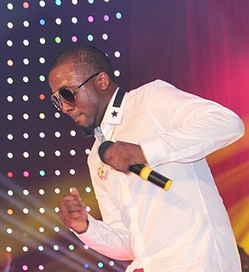
- Ice Prince performing at an event in 2014

Background information
- Born: Panshak Henry Zamani; 30 October 1988 (age 37); Minna, Niger State, Nigeria
- Origin: Jos, Plateau State, Nigeria
- Genre: Hip hop
- Occupations: Rapper; songwriter
- Years active: 2004–present
- Labels: Super Cool Cats; Chocolate City (former)

Panshak Henry Zamani (born 30 October 1986), known professionally as Ice Prince (or Ice Prince Zamani), is a Nigerian rapper and songwriter. He rose to fame after releasing "Oleku", one of Nigeria's most remixed songs of all time. He won the 2009 Hennessy Artistry Club Tour. His debut studio album Everybody Loves Ice Prince was released in 2011. It was supported by three singles: "Oleku", "Superstar" and "Juju". In 2013, Ice Prince released Fire of Zamani as his second studio album. The album contained the singles "Aboki", "More", "Gimme Dat" and "I Swear". On 1 July 2015, Ice Prince was announced as the vice president of Chocolate City. He held the position until leaving the label in 2016. He has collaborated with several African rappers, including Navio, Khaligraph Jones, AKA, and Sarkodie.

== Early life and education ==
Ice Prince was born Panshak Henri Zamani in the city of Minna. At Age two, he moved with his family to the mining city of Jos, Plateau State. He is of Angas ethnicity. While residing in Jos, he attended St. Murumba College. He also attended the Science Tutorial Niger State College in Jos.

== Career ==
=== 1999–2011: Everybody Loves Ice Prince ===
In 1999, he began writing rap songs and started performing them at school; in 2001 he began recording them. In 2002, he and some friends formed the "ECOMOG Squad" but split after a year. In 2004, he connected with M.I, Jesse Jagz, Ruby, Lindsey, Eve, Taz, and together they became what is now known today as the "Loopy Crew". He attended the University of Jos to study zoology, but had to stop because of a "financial constraint". During the aforementioned interview, Ice Prince opened up about why he chose to name his debut album, Everybody Loves Ice Prince. He said "What made me give my album that name was when I lost my Mum, really. There was so much love, so much care from all around the world. People really showed me love and it was after that incident that I came back to record my album and I thought what better name to call my album than Everybody Loves Ice Prince because I was shown love".

"Oleku", Ice Prince's first single off his debut album was met with great reception throughout Nigeria. The song was released under Chocolate City. Ice Prince's 'rap resume' has a long list of songs he's been featured on. He was featured on Taikoon's "Respect My Hustle" with Banky W, DJ Neptune's "This Gbedu Reloaded" with YQ & Shank, Bez's "Super Sun (Remix)" with ELDee & Eva Alordiah, YQ's "Efimile (Remix)" with Naeto C, M.I, Banky W, & ELDee, Pherowshuz's "Korrect (remix)" with M.I & Terry Tha Rapman, Dekunle Fuji's "Funmilayo" with Jesse Jagz, Jamix's "My Party" with Wizkid & Kel, Reminisce's "2 Mussh [Remix]" with Sauce Kid, and Knighthouse's "Make it Better" with Mo'Cheddah, Funbi, & Mobie, among others.

=== 2012–2013: Fire of Zamani ===
In 2012, he began frequent collaborations with Grip Boiz City producer Chopstix, releasing "Aboki" in the summer of 2012. An accompanying music video was released alongside it. "Aboki" peaked at number 92 on Afribiz's Top 100 chart. On 28 August 2012, Ice Prince released "More" as the second single from the album. The song was also produced by Chopstix. The music video for "More" was shot and directed in London by Moe Musa. It stars Lola Rae, a British Nigerian recording artist known for her single "Watch My Ting Go". The video premiered at the 2012 Channel O Music Video Awards.

On 25 January 2013, Ice Prince released "Aboki (Remix)"; he described the song as the "biggest African collision ever". The song features Sarkodie, Mercy Johnson, Wizkid, M.I and Khuli Chana. On 24 April 2013, Ice Prince and Chocolate City released "Gimme Dat" and "V.I.P" simultaneously. The former made the album's final track-listing, while the latter didn't.

=== 2015–2016: Jos to the World and Super Cool Cats ===
In 2015, Ice Prince began making available singles from his third studio album. The eventual release of the album signified his first independent album outside Chocolate City record label. He revealed to Pulse he had Universal Studio in the US mix and master the album. On 10 March 2015, Ice Prince founded Super Cool Cats, right after his contract with Chocolate City expired. On 23 May 2016, at a press conference held at Chocolate City office in Lagos, Ice Prince unveiled Chocolate City, as the parent company of his record label, and a sub-division of Chocolate City. On 28 August 2016, Ice Prince unveiled Jilex Anderson at The Quilox Ultra Pool Party (#QUPP), as SCC first act. On 12 December 2020, Ice Prince announced the signing of Au Pro, on Twitter, via a tweet.

In September 2023, Ice Prince teased a new album featuring MI Abaga and Jesse Jagz.

=== Musical influences ===
Ice Prince cited Notorious B.I.G., Rakim, Jay-Z, Common, Talib Kweli, Kanye West, Ludacris, Busta Rhymes, Lauryn Hill, M.I and Jesse Jagz as his key musical influences.

== Personal life ==
Ice Prince has a son named Jamal.

== Discography ==
Studio albums

- Everybody Loves Ice Prince (2011)
- Fire of Zamani (2013)
- Jos to the World (2016)

EPs

- Trash Can (2015)
- C.O.L.D (2018)

Compilation albums

- The Indestructible Choc Boi Nation (2015)

== Filmography ==
=== Film and television ===
Film
Year	Title	Role	Notes	Ref
2013	House of Gold	Tony	Supporting role	
Television
Year	Title	Role	Notes	Ref
2013	Shuga (Season 3)	Himself	Guest appearance	

== Videography ==
Year	Title	Album	Director	Ref
2011	Oleku (Featuring Brymo)	Everybody Loves Ice Prince	Mex Films	
2011	Superstar	Everybody Loves Ice Prince	Katung Aduwak	
2012	More	Fire Of Zamani	Moe Musa	
2012	Aboki	Fire Of Zamani	Phil Lee	
2013	I Swear (featuring French Montana)	Fire Of Zamani	JR Saint	
2014	Jambo	Fire Of Zamani	Sesan	
2014	Whiskey (Featuring Sunny Nneji)	Fire Of Zamani	AJE Filmworks	
2014	Shots On Shots (with Sarkodie)	Non Album Single	Nana Kofi Asihene	
2014	That Could Be Us	Non Album Single	Uprooted Media	
2015	One Day	Trash Can EP	Moe Musa	
2015	Mutumina	Trash Can EP	Mex Films	
2015	Yawa Go Dey(Featuring Robbie Celeste)	Trash Can EP	Cloud 9 Virals	
2016	Jos To The World	Jos To The World	UAiMAGES	
2017	No Mind Dem (featuring Vanessa Mdee)	Jos To The World	SOS Media	
2018	Replay (Produced by Masterkraft It's on the beat)	TBA	SOS Media	

== Awards and nominations ==
Year	Event	Prize	Recipient	Result	Ref
2018	The Headies	Best Rap single	Me Versus Me	Pending	
2014	Ben TV Awards	Best Male Hip Hop Artist	Himself	Won	
2014	The Future Africa Awards	Prize in Entertainment	Himself	Nominated	
2014	2014 Nigeria Entertainment Awards	Best Rap Act of the Year	Himself	Won	
2014	City People Entertainment Awards	Rap Artiste of the Year	Himself	Nominated	
2014	City People Entertainment Awards	Rap Album of the Year	Fire of Zamani	Nominated	
2014	MTV Africa Music Awards 2014	Best Hip Hop	Himself	Nominated	
2014	World Music Awards	World's Best Male Artist	Himself	Nominated	
2014	World Music Awards	World's Best Live Act	Himself	Nominated	
2014	World Music Awards	World's Best Entertainer of the Year	Himself	Nominated	
2013	The Headies 2013	Artiste of the Year	Himself	Nominated	
2013	Channel O Music Video Awards	Most Gifted African West Video	"Aboki"	Nominated	
2013	Channel O Music Video Awards	Most Gifted Video of the Year	"Aboki"	Nominated	
2013	4syte Music Video Awards	Best African Act Video	"Aboki"	Nominated	
2013	Nigeria Music Video Awards (NMVA)	Best Hip Hop Video	"V.I.P"	Won	
2013	Nigeria Music Video Awards (NMVA)	Best Use of Visual Effects	"V.I.P"	Nominated	
2013	MOBO Awards	Best African Act	Himself	Nominated	
2013	Nigeria Entertainment Awards	Best Rap Act of the Year	Himself	Won	
2013	BET Awards 2013	Best International Act: Africa	Himself	Won	
2013	City People Entertainment Awards	Best Hip-Hop Artiste of the Year	Himself	Won	
2013	City People Entertainment Awards	Musician of the Year (Male)	Himself	Nominated	
2013	City People Entertainment Awards	Best Rap Artiste of the Year	Himself	Nominated	
2012	Channel O Music Video Awards	Most Gifted Hip-hop Video of the Year	"Superstar"	Won	
2012	Channel O Music Video Awards	Most Gifted Reggae Video of the Year	"Juju"	Nominated	
2012	Nigeria Entertainment Awards	Best Album of the Year	Everybody Loves Ice Prince	Nominated	
2012	Nigeria Entertainment Awards	Best Rap Act of the Year	Himself	Nominated	
2012	BET Awards	Best International Act: Africa	Himself	Nominated	
2012	The Headies 2012	Album of the Year	Everybody Loves Ice Prince	Nominated	
2012	The Headies 2012	Best Rap Album	Everybody Loves Ice Prince	Won	
2012	The Headies 2012	Artist of the Year	Himself	Nominated	
2012	The Headies 2012	Hip Hop World Revelation of the Year	Himself	Nominated	
2012	Ghana Music Awards	African Artist of the Year	Himself	Won	
2011	The Headies 2011	Best Rap Single	"Oleku" (featuring Brymo)	Won	
2011	The Headies 2011	Song of the Year	"Oleku" (featuring Brymo)	Won	
2011	The Headies 2011	Best Collabo	"Oleku" (featuring Brymo)	Nominated	
2011	The Headies 2011	Best Collabo	"Joor Oh (Remix)" (Jahbless featuring Ice Prince, Durella, Reminisce, and eLDee)	Nominated	
2011	The Headies 2011	Best Street-Hop Artiste	"Joor Oh (Remix)" (Jahbless featuring Ice Prince, Durella, Reminisce, and eLDee)	Nominated	
2011	The Headies 2011	Next Rated	Ice Prince for "Oleku"	Nominated	
2011	The Headies 2011	Lyricist on the Roll	Ice Prince for "Oleku"	Nominated	
2011	Channel O Music Video Awards	Most Gifted Newcomer Video	"Oleku" (featuring Brymo)	Won	
2011	Channel O Music Video Awards	Most Gifted Hip Hop Video	"Nobody Test Me" (Jesse Jagz featuring M.I and Ice Prince)	Nominated	
2011	Channel O Music Video Awards	Most Gifted Video of the Year	"Molowo Noni" (Samklef featuring Wizkid, D'Prince, and Ice Prince)	Nominated	
2011	Dynamix All Youth Awards	Best New Artiste	Himself	Won	
2011	Nigeria Music Video Awards (NMVA)	Best Contemporary Afro Video	"Oleku" (featuring Brymo)	Nominated	
2011	Nigeria Entertainment Awards	Hottest Single of the Year	"Oleku" (featuring Brymo)	Won	
2011	Nigeria Entertainment Awards	Best New Act of the Year	Himself	Nominated	
2011	Nigeria Entertainment Awards	Best Rap Act of the Year	Himself	Nominated	
2011	City People Entertainment Awards	Song of the Year	"Oleku" (featuring Brymo)	Won	
2011	Eko FM/ Radio Lagos Awards	Young Artiste of the Year	Himself	Won	
2010	Dynamix All Youth Awards	Promising Artiste of the Year	Himself	Nominated	
2010	Dynamix All Youth Awards	Song of the Year	"Oleku" (featuring Brymo)	Nominated	
2009	Hennessy Artistry Club Tour	Hennessy Artistry	Himself	Won	
