= CKay discography =

Musician discography

- Studio albums: 2
- EPs: 4
- Singles: 16
- Promotional singles: 1

Nigerian Afrobeats singer CKay has released one studio album, three EPs, eleven singles, and one promotional single. CKay started his music career with Loopy Music, as a record producer. Following the merger between Loopy Music and Chocolate City, he automatically joined Chocolate City roaster. His production credits include M.I Abaga's "Your Father", Koker's "Give Them", Yung6ix's "Everything Gucci", Dotman's "Tonight", and Bisola's "Controlla". He is currently signed to Warner Music Africa, and Atlantic Records.

On 30 August 2019, he released his second ep, CKay the First, through Chocolate City. The project helped bring CKay to popularity and earned him his first chart entry on Billboard 200, Canadian Albums Chart, and the Dutch Album Top 100. The EP was a sleeper hit that spawned the hit track "Love Nwantiti", which became the second Nigerian song to chart on the Billboard Hot 100. In 2021, he became the first African artist to hit 20 million Spotify listeners, and the second African artist in 2022 to reach 1.2 billion streams.

== Studio albums ==
List of extended plays, with selected details and chart positions
Title	Details	Peak chart positions		
Title	Details	FRA	NG	NG Alt
Sad Romance	Released: 23 September 2022; Label: Wea/Warner Music South Africa; Formats: Digital download, streaming	88	29	1
Emotions	Released: 18 October 2024; Label: Warner Music Africa; Formats: Digital download, streaming	—	35	—
Banger Boy	Released: 7 August 2026; Label: Boyfriend Music Limited; Formats: Digital download, streaming	—	62	—

== Extended plays ==
List of extended plays, with selected details and chart positions
Title	Details	Peak chart positions					
Title	Details	CAN	DEN	FRA	NLD	US	US World
Who the Fuck Is CKay?	Released: 11 September 2017; Label: Chocolate City; Formats: Digital download, streaming	—	—	—	—	—	—
CKay the First	Released: 30 August 2019; Label: Chocolate City; Formats: Digital download, streaming	20	24	35	12	117	4
Boyfriend	Released: 12 February 2021; Label: Warner Music South Africa; Formats: Digital download, streaming	—	—	—	—	—	—
African Girls	Released: 22 May 2026; Label: Boyfriend Music; Formats: Digital download, streaming						

== Singles ==
List of singles, showing title and year released with selected chart positions
Title	Year	Chart positions										Certifications	Album
Title	Year	NG	AUS	FRA	GER	NLD	NOR	SWE	SWI	UK	US	Certifications	Album
"Container"	2017	—	—	—	—	—	—	—	—	—	—		Non-album single
"Way"	2019	—	—	—	—	—	—	—	—	—	—		CKay the First
"Love Nwantiti"	2019	—	—	—	—	—	—	—	—	—	—	SNEP: Diamond	CKay the First
"Felony"	2020	—	—	—	—	—	—	—	—	—	—		Boyfriend
"Skoin Skoin" (featuring Bianca Costa)	2021	—	—	—	—	—	—	—	—	—	—		Boyfriend
"Love Nwantiti (Ah Ah Ah)" (solo or remix featuring Joeboy and Kuami Eugene)	2021	14	8	1	6	1	1	4	1	3	26	ARIA: Gold; BPI: 2× Platinum; BVMI: Platinum; RIAA: 4× Platinum	Sad Romance
"Kiss Me Like You Miss Me" (with Payal Dev)	2021	—	—	—	—	—	—	—	—	—	—		Non-album single
"Emiliana"	2021	5	—	9	—	21	—	90	27	—	—	BPI: Silver; SNEP: Platinum	Sad Romance
"By Your Side" (featuring Blxckie)	2021	—	—	—	—	—	—	—	—	—	—		Sad Romance
"Maria" (featuring Silly Walks Movement)	2022	—	—	—	—	—	—	—	—	—	—		Non-album single
"Watawi" (featuring Davido, Focalistic, and Abidoza)	2022	13	—	—	—	—	—	—	—	—	—		Sad Romance
"HALLELUJAH" (feat. Blaqbonez)	2023	9	—	—	—	—	—	—	—	—	—		Sad Romance (Deluxe)
"nwayi"	2023	87	—	—	—	—	—	—	—	—	—		Sad Romance (Deluxe)
"BODY (danz)"	2026												African Girls
"Badaminton"	2026												African Girls
"African Girls" (feat. Kidd Carder)	2026												African Girls

== Promotional singles ==
List of promotional singles
Title	Year	Album
"Bad Musician Bad Producer"	2016	Non-album single
"by now (Amapiano Remix)"	2023	Non-album single
"emiliana (DJ Yohan & AX'EL Remix)"	2023	Non-album single
