= CKay the Second =

EP by CKay
- Released: 13 June 2025
- Studio: Boyfriend Studio
- Genre: Afrobeats
- Length: 17:36
- Labels: Boyfriend Music; AWAL
- Producers: BMH; Northboi; Niphkeys

CKay chronology
Emotions (2024)	CKay the Second (2025)	Banger Boy (2026)

CKay the Second is the fourth extended play by Nigerian singer-songwriter CKay. It was released on 13 June 2025 by Boyfriend Music (as CKay Holdings LLC), and distributed by AWAL. The EP features guest appearances from Sabrina Claudio, and Bella Shmurda. It was produced primarily by BMH, with production from Northboi, and Niphkeys.

== Background ==
On 18 April 2025, CKay officially exits Warner Music Africa, following the end of his record deal.

On 31 May 2025, he signed a new partnership deal with AWAL, and announced his forthcoming extended play CKay the Second.

== Critical reception ==
In a review for Album Talks, Michelle Ejiro noted that "As a sequel, it doesn't quite capture the energy of CKay the First, which featured livelier, more rhythmic, and bolder moments. This is quieter, more inward, and shaped by a softer emotional lens. It leaves a quiet gap and raises a simple question: if this is the sequel, what story is it continuing? Because if it’s meant to pick up where things left off, it feels far removed from where the story began."

== Track listing ==
CKay the Second track listing
No.	Title	Writer(s)	Producer(s)	Length
1.	"tey tey"	Chukwuka Ekweani	BMH	2:52
2.	"forever"	Chukwuka Ekweani	BMH	2:48
3.	"permit me"	Chukwuka Ekweani	BMH	2:55
4.	"again" (with. Sabrina Claudio)	Chukwuka Ekweani; Sabrina Claudio	Northboi	2:23
5.	"say no more"	Chukwuka Ekweani	Niphkeys	2:40
6.	"nothing spoil" (with. Bella Shmurda)	Chukwuka Ekweani; Akinbiyi Ahmed	BMH	3:58
Total length:				17:36

== Personnel ==
- Chukwuka Ekweani – primary artist, writer, executive producer
- Joseph Salubi – executive producer
- BMH – primary production (track 1, 2, 3, 6)
- Northboi – production (track 4)
- Niphkeys – production (track 5)
- Sabrina Claudio – vocals, writer (track 4)
- Bella Shmurda – vocals, writer (track 6)

== Release history ==
Release history and formats for CKay the Second
Region	Date	Format	Label
Various	13 June 2025	Digital download; streaming	Boyfriend Music; AWAL
