= University of the Witwatersrand School of Chemical and Metallurgical Engineering =

School within University of the Witwatersrand

School of Chemical and Metallurgical Engineering, University of the Witwatersrand, Johannesburg
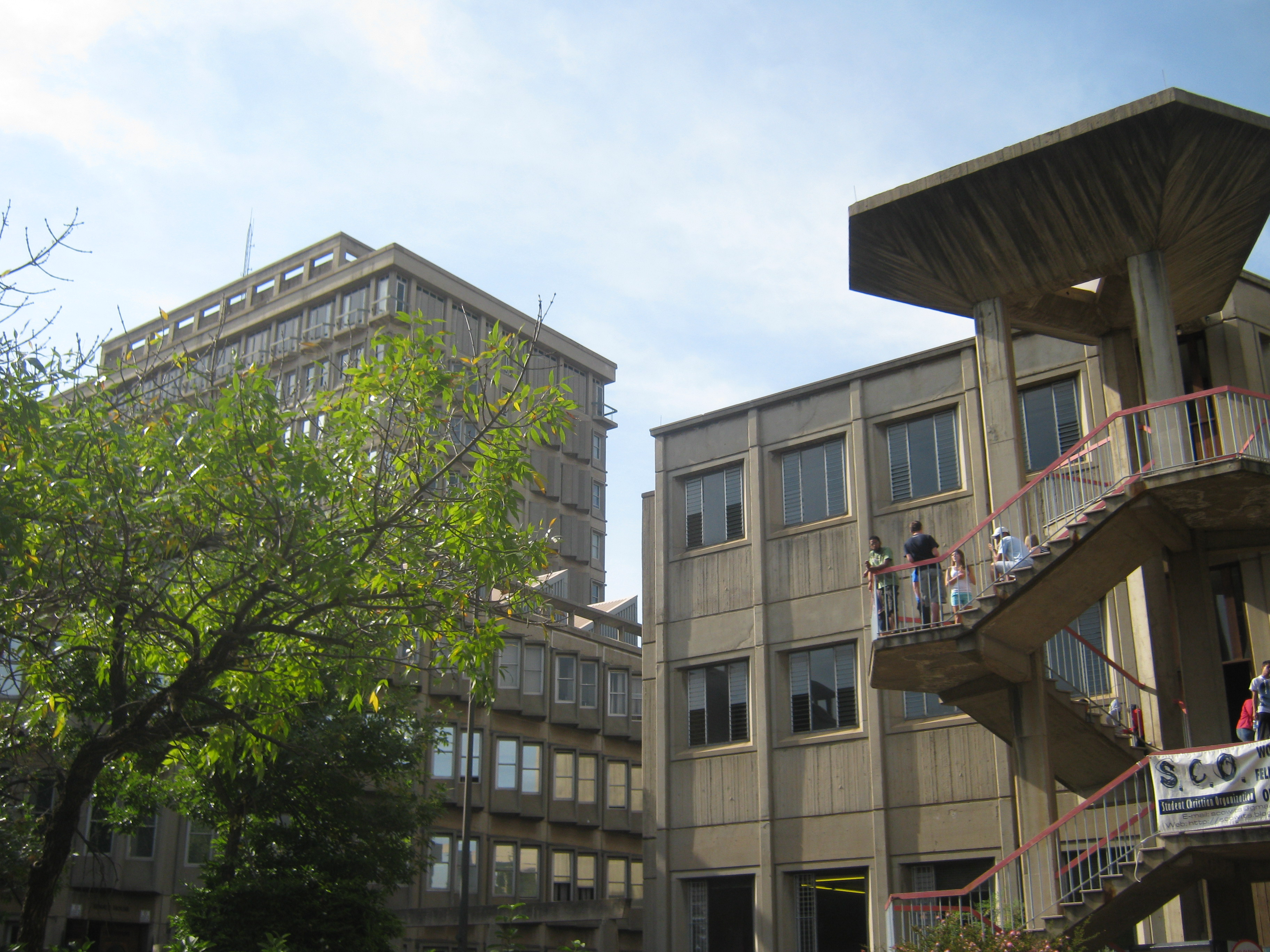
- Richard Ward Building (right)
- Established: 1904
- Academic staff: 25
- Undergraduates: approx. 800
- Postgraduates: approx. 100
- Location: Johannesburg, Gauteng, South Africa; 26°11′35.14″S 28°01′46.95″E
- Website: Official Website

The School of Chemical and Metallurgical Engineering is one of seven schools in the University of the Witwatersrand's Faculty of Engineering and the Built Environment. The School offers 4-year undergraduate degrees and post-graduate degrees in chemical and metallurgical engineering.

== History ==
The University of the Witwatersrand was founded in 1904 as the SA School of Mines from the original 1896 Kimberley School of Mines. It moved to Johannesburg in 1904 after the second Anglo-Boer War (1899–1902) and became an autonomous university with its own charter and statute in 1922. While Metallurgical Engineering degrees were granted from the onset, Chemical Engineering degrees were granted from 1922 onwards. Chemical Engineering was originally part of the Department of Chemistry, and Chemical Engineering became a separate department in 1961. In 1995, the two departments of Chemical Engineering and Metallurgical Engineering merged, and after a brief period as the School of Process Engineering and Materials, became the School of Chemical and Metallurgical Engineering in 2005.

The School will be celebrating its 21st birthday (as a combined entity) in 2015 and has several activities planned.

== Location ==
2nd floor laboratories of the Richard Ward Building.

The School is located in the Richard Ward Building on the East Campus of the University. The building is named after Richard Ward (1891–1976) who left R1 million to Wits on his death. At the time, this was the largest amount left to the University.

In 2013, the School started major upgrades and modernisation of the building, with budgeted plans to the value of R75 million. Renovations to date include:

– 2nd floor (Nanotechnology, Biotechnology, Coal, VOC and Syngas Laboratories)

– 7th floor (postgraduate office space)

== Academic degrees ==
The School offers undergraduate and post-graduate degrees in chemical and metallurgical engineering.

=== Undergraduate degrees ===
- Bachelor of Science (Chemical Engineering)
- Bachelor of Science (Metallurgical Engineering)

=== Postgraduate degrees and graduate diplomas ===
- Postgradute Diploma in Engineering
- MSc – Master of Science
- PhD

== Research ==
=== Research entities ===
The School has several research focuses:

==== NRF/DST Centre of Excellence in Strong Materials (CoE-SM) ====
Centre for strong materials.

==== NRF/DST Chair in Sustainable Process Engineering ====
The South African Research Chair in Sustainable Process Engineering was established in 2013 under Professor Thokozani Majozi. The work conducted under this chair can be broadly categorised into batch and continuous process integration. In Batch Process Integration research is focused on developing novel mathematical models for capturing the essence of time, which is the backbone of batch processes. These mathematical models are then used as the basis for energy and water optimization in multipurpose batch facilities. On the other hand, work on Continuous Process Integration is focused on Utilities Debottlenecking for energy and water optimization. The Chair's recent studies have also addressed systems that exhibit the water-energy nexus, as traditionally encountered in integrated water and membrane networks.

==== Clean Coal Technology Research ====
The Clean Coal Technology Research group is the home of the DST/NRF funded South African Research Chair of Clean Coal Technology. Its expertise in coal processing, characterisation, and application, is amongst the best in the world. The group's interest lies in the in-depth research into coal and carbon as a material, and the advancement of technologies and industry practices that significantly increase coal conversion efficiency and decrease environmental impact.

Upgraded facilities (2013) in the Richard Ward Building.

==== Industrial and Mining Water Research Unit (IMWaRU) ====
The Industrial and Mining Water Research Unit comprises several researchers in chemical engineering, microbiology and other disciplines, investigating acid mine drainage (AMD), constructed wetlands, water footprinting, life-cycle assessment and more.

==== Minerals and Metals Extraction and Recovery Group (MMERG) ====
The group aims to develop new, improved and innovative processes for the beneficiation of various metals from a variety of different sources, including low grade ores, solid wastes and secondary sources of metals (e.g. electronic scrap). The group consists of Prof. Selo Ndlovu, Prof. Vusi Sibanda, Dr. Lizelle van Dyk, Dr. Geoffrey Simate and Prof. Herman Potgieter. A number of postgraduate students are being supervised on various projects ranging from bioleaching of metals to gas phase extraction of vanadium from spent catalysts.

=== Research interests ===
The School also offers specialist research interests including: Attainable Region Theory, Comminution (using Discrete Element Method-DEM) and flotation, Engineering education, Nanotechnology, Petroleum engineering, and Pyro-Metallurgy.

== Past heads of school ==
The following have been the Heads of the School:

- Prof. Lizelle van Dyk (Sept 2025 - current)
- Prof. Geoffrey Simate (Oct 2024 - Aug 2025) - acting
- Prof. Josias van der Merwe (2020 - Sept 2024)
- Prof. Herman Potgieter (2015 – 2019)
- Prof. Thoko Majozi (July – December 2014) – acting
- Prof. Sunny Iyuke (July 2009 – June 2014)
- Mr. Richard Bob Tait (May – June 2009) – acting
- Prof. Herman Potgieter (2004–2008)
- Prof. Hurman Rauf Eric (Jan – May 2004) – acting
- Prof. Walter Te Riele (2002–2003) (Process and Materials Engineering)
- Prof. Hurman Rauf Eric (1998–2001) (Process and Materials Engineering)
- Prof. David Glasser (Jan – Aug 1998) – acting (Process and Materials Engineering)
- Prof. A.W. Bryson (1995–1998) (Process and Materials Engineering)
