= Adeniji =

Adeniji is both a surname and a given name which means "the crown that beholds honour". Notable people with the name include:

== Surname ==
- Hakeem Adeniji (born 1997), American football player
- Olawale Adeniji Ige (1938–2022), Nigerian engineer
- Oluyemi Adeniji (1934–2017), Nigerian diplomat and politician
- Temi Adeniji, Nigerian-American music executive at Warner Music Group
- Tunde Adeniji (born 1995), Nigerian footballer

== Given name ==
- Adeniji Adele (1893–1964), Nigerian Oba of Lagos
