= Msinga Local Municipality =

Coordinates: 28°44′46″S 30°27′09″E

Msinga
- Local municipality
- Seal

- Location in KwaZulu-Natal
- Country: South Africa
- Province: KwaZulu-Natal
- District: uMzinyathi
- Seat: Tugela Ferry
- Wards: 21

Government
  - Type: Municipal council
  - Mayor: Felinkosi Joshua Sikhakhane (IFP)

Area
  - Total: 2,501 km^{2} (966 sq mi)

Population (2011)
  - Total: 177,577
  - Density: 71.00/km^{2} (183.9/sq mi)

Racial makeup (2011)
  - Black African: 99.6%
  - Coloured: 0.1%
  - Indian/Asian: 0.1%
  - White: 0.2%

First languages (2011)
  - Zulu: 96.1%
  - Southern Ndebele: 1.3%
  - Other: 2.6%
- Time zone: UTC+2 (SAST)
- Municipal code: KZN244

Msinga Municipality (Zulu: UMasipala wase Msinga) is a local municipality within the Umzinyathi District Municipality, in the KwaZulu-Natal province of South Africa. Msinga is an isiZulu word meaning "a current in the sea where air movement causes ripples on top of the water surface and ends up influencing the nearby climatic conditions through its breeze". The municipality is largely located in deep gorges of the Tugela and Buffalo rivers, isolated from the immediate surrounding municipal areas. The population dynamics result in a growing rural area and a declining urban area in the municipality, contrary to most other areas in the country. This can be attributed to the fact that the urban areas of municipality are very small and are unable to provide the normal range of goods and services provided in urban areas.

It is a poverty stricken area with few economic resources and little economic activity. Social services and private households generate 29% of the income for the area.

== Main places ==
The 2001 census divided the municipality into the following main places:

Place	Code	Area (km^{2})	Population
Baso	52201	85.54	9,655
Bomvu	52202	371.75	30,307
Chunu	52203	367.35	41,560
Gwazumlungu Nlovu	52204	9.63	753
Khanyile	52205	9.75	108
Majozi	52206	10.80	1,099
Mawuzini	52207	5.49	457
Mthembu	52209	151.80	19,160
Mtungwa	52210	4.02	1,756
Ngome	52211	3.90	1,772
Ngubane	52212	93.45	5,849
Othame	52213	8.93	1,135
Pomeroy	52214	7.01	998
Qamu	52215	628.90	50,867
Qizi Mtshshali	52216	6.07	694
Remainder of the municipality	52208	737.60	1,850

== Politics ==
The municipal council consists of forty-one members elected by mixed-member proportional representation. Twenty-one councillors are elected by first-past-the-post voting in twenty-one wards, while the remaining twenty are chosen from party lists so that the total number of party representatives is proportional to the number of votes received.

In the election of 4 November 2026 the Inkatha Freedom Party (IFP) won a majority of twenty-five seats on the council.

The following table shows the results of the election.

Party	Ward			List			Total seats
Party	Votes	%	Seats	Votes	%	Seats	Total seats
Inkatha Freedom Party	31,030	60.66	20	31,028	60.60	5	25
uMkhonto weSizwe Party	14,662	28.66	1	14,855	29.01	11	12
African National Congress	3,853	7.53	0	3,767	7.36	3	3
Democratic Alliance	578	1.13	0	585	1.14	1	1
8 other parties	1,035	2.02	0	968	1.89	0	0
Total	51,158	100.00	21	51,203	100.00	20	41
Valid votes	51,158	98.57		51,203	98.74		
Invalid/blank votes	741	1.43		653	1.26		
Total votes	51,899	100.00		51,856	100.00		
Registered voters/turnout	98,150	52.88		98,150	52.83		
