= Janie Bay =

South African musician

- Origin: Cape Town, South Africa
- Genres: Pop; folk rock; rock
- Occupation: Musician
- Instruments: Vocals; guitar
- Website: janiebay.com

Janie Bay is a South African singer-songwriter from the Helderberg area of Cape Town. She was signed to Warner Music South Africa.

== Career ==
Janie Bay began her musical career by self-releasing the album I Remember in 2011. The record generated three no. 1 hits on local mainstream and student radio stations: "Feels Like", "The Meaning", and "This Love". She promoted the album in an acoustic format, together with her brother, under the name Janie & The Beard. The duo went on to perform at numerous venues and festivals, including Oppikoppi, KKNK, and the first edition of the Cape Town Folk & Acoustic Music Festival. In 2014, Bay relocated to Pretoria. In 2016, she signed a recording contract with Warner Music South Africa.

Bay's first major-label single, "Dance", was released on 3 February 2017. It was followed on 15 September by her sophomore album, Miscellany. The record spawned the singles "Better Off", "Wag Vir Jou (feat. Hunter Kennedy)", and "Koning". The album was ultimately nominated for a South African Music Award in the Best Adult Contemporary Album category. Meanwhile, the song "Can't Be the One" won a Gold Award for Best Music in a Video at the 2019 Queen Palm International Film Festival in Palm Springs, California.

Bay's next single, "Amper Daar", released in 2019, went on to reach the number 1 position on the Jacaranda FM SA Top 20, Groot FM, Maroela Media, and Joox charts. Later that year, the artist collaborated with rapper Early B on the track "Die Heelal". She followed up with the single "Jammer" in 2020.

On 4 September 2020, Bay released the acoustic album In Die Sitkamer It included some of her previous singles, the original track "Herfs", as well as a cover of the Elvis Presley hit "Can't Help Falling in Love with You".

Bay's next single, a collaboration with Danie Reënwolf, was titled "Ek Glo Nog In Jou" and came out on 13 November 2020. A year later, the singer collaborated with musicians Majozi and Early B on the single "My Lief". Both songs appear on Bay's subsequent album, the EP Prisma. The third single from the record, titled "Kalmeer", was released in September 2021.

== Discography ==
Albums

- I Remember (2011)
- Miscellany (2017)
- In Die Sitkamer (2020)
- Prisma (EP, 2021)

Singles

- "Feels Like" (2011)
- "The Meaning" (2011)
- "This Love" (2011)
- "Dance" (2017)
- "Better Off" (2017)
- "Wag Vir Jou (feat. Hunter Kennedy)" (2017)
- "Koning" (2017)
- "Amper Daar" (2019)
- "Die Heelal (feat. Early B)" (2019)
- "Jammer" (2020)
- "Ek Glo Nog In Jou (feat. Danie Reënwolf)" (2020)
- "My Lief (feat. Majozi & Early B)" (2021)
- "Kalmeer" (2021)

Guest appearances

- Bouwer Bosch – "Hardloop (feat. Janie Bay)" (2015)
- Dawie De Jager – "Stroomop My Mens (feat. Janie Bay)" (2018)

== Awards and nominations ==
- 24th South African Music Awards – Best Adult Contemporary Album – Nominated (2018)
- Queen Palm International Film Festival – Best Music in a Video – Won (2018)
