= Temi Adeniji =

American-Nigerian music executive

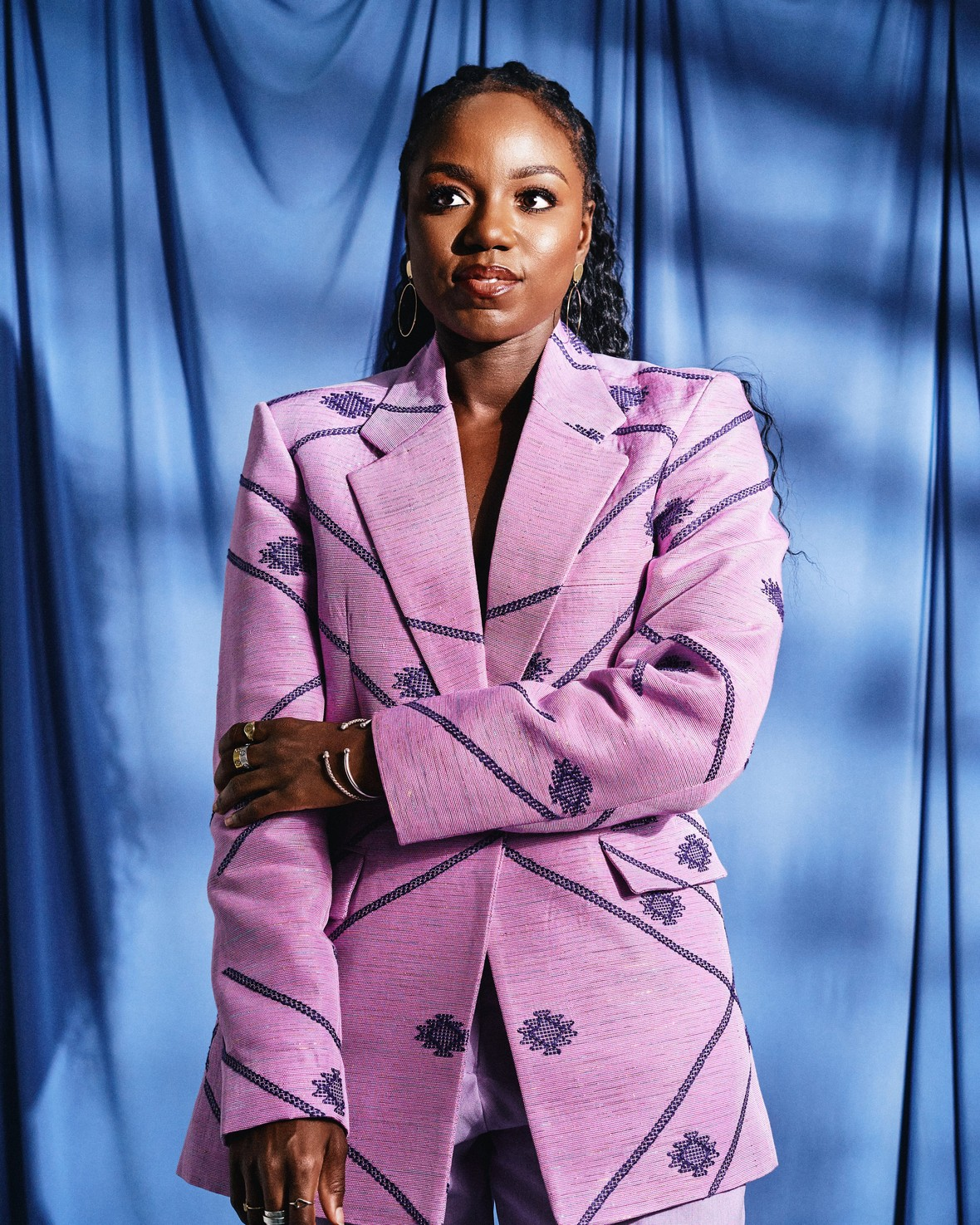
- Born: Temilade Adeniji; 16 July 1987 (age 39)
- Citizenship: Nigerian, American
- Education: Princeton; University College London; Columbia Law School
- Occupation: Record executive
- Years active: 2016-present
- Employer: Warner Music Group
- Known for: Warner Music Africa
- Title: Managing Director
- Parents: Lateph Adeniji (father); Oluwatoyin Adeniji (mother)

Temilade Adeniji, known as Temi Adeniji, is a Nigerian-American music executive. Adeniji is the managing director of Warner Music Africa (formerly known as Warner Music South Africa).

== Early life and education ==
Temilade Adeniji, is a descendant of the Yoruba ethnic group from the western part of Nigeria. She was born to Nigerian parents Lateph Adeniji, and Oluwatoyin Adeniji. She graduated from Princeton University, with a bachelor of arts (BA) in Political Economy. After her graduation, Adeniji completed a joint degree program, with a Juris Doctor degree from Columbia Law School and a Master of Laws degree from University College London.

== Career ==
Adeniji began her career working at a law firm at Shearman & Sterling, and then moved to Kirkland & Ellis, before joining Warner Music Group in 2016 as the Director of the International Strategy & Operations department. She is credited for the crossover success of CKay 2019 single "Love Nwantiti". In 2019, she became Vice President of the department, and was later elevated to Senior Vice President in 2020. In 2021, she was named managing director of Warner Music Africa (fka. Warner Music South Africa), and senior vice president to lead the strategy team for Sub-Saharan Africa. In 2025, Billboard listed Adeniji on its Global Power Players list.

Business positions
Preceded by Tracy Fraser	Managing Director of Warner Music Africa; September 1, 2021-present	Succeeded by incumbent
