= Sad Romance =

Studio album by CKay
- Released: 23 September 2022
- Genre: Afrobeats
- Length: 37:10
- Label: Warner Music Africa
- Producer: CKay; P2J; Christer; Abayomi Ilerioluwa; BMH; Charlie Handsome; Hoskins; Ramoni; Abidoza; Sarz; Blaisebeatz

CKay chronology
Sad Romance (2022)	Emotions (2024)

Singles from Sad Romance
- 1. "Emiliana" Released: 3 December 2021; 2. "Watawi" Released: 17 June 2022; 3. "You" Released: 26 August 2022; 4. "Mmadu" Released: 21 September 2022

Sad Romance is the debut studio album by Nigerian singer CKay. It was released by Warner Music Africa on 23 September 2022. The album features guest appearances from Ayra Starr, Davido, Focalistic, Abidoza, Mayra Andrade, and Ronisia, and was executive produced by CKay. Following the release of the album CKay embarked on the Sad Romance North America Tour (2022).

It was produced primarily by CKay, with production from P2J, Christer, Abayomi Ilerioluwa, BMH, Charlie Handsome, Hoskins, Ramoni, Abidoza, Sarz, and Blaisebeatz. The album received generally positive reviews from critics. Lyrically, Sad Romance communicates with elements associate with love, lust, commitment, pleasure, and pain. The album was supported with a bonus track titled "Love Nwantiti".

== Background and promotion ==
On 3 November 2021, CKay spoke to Billboard writer Darlene Aderoju about his upcoming album. He stated that he wanted to collaborate with R&B artists like SZA, Summer Walker, and Chris Brown, as well as pop stars like Chris Martin and Billie Eilish, and said: "My album is going to be my best work because I’m going to put my whole soul and essence into it." He tweet on 22 May 2022, "My album will make history".

Speaking with Guardian Life magazine, CKay said, "My music is greatly inspired by how I'm feeling at the moment. If I've just broken up, that is what you're going to hear, the vibe of someone that's dealing with heartbreak; and if I'm in an emotional place, you’re going to hear it in the music." He released "You" and "Mmadu" as promotional singles ahead of the release of Sad Romance. On 24 August 2022, CKay announced tour dates for Sad Romance North America Tour to begin on 1 October and end on 28 October 2022.

== Release ==
In late 2021, CKay released "Emiliana", following the success of his sleeper hit "Love Nwantiti", which earned him his first Billboard chart entry. On 1 April 2022, he released the music video for "Emiliana", directed by Ahmed Mosh. "Emiliana" peaked at number one for seven consecutive weeks on the UK Afrobeats Singles Chart. On 6 December 2021, it was named song of the day by The Native, It debuted at number forty-four on the TurnTable Top 50 on 13 December, and reached number five on 24 January 2022. On 29 March 2022, the track debuted at number ten on the newly launched Billboard U.S. Afrobeats Songs chart.

On 17 June 2022, CKay released "Watawi", accompanied by a music video directed by Dalia Dias in South Africa. On 26 June 2022, the record peaked at number six on the UK Afrobeats Singles Chart. On 28 June 2022, "Watawi" debuted at number 13 on the Nigeria TurnTable Top 50 and number 21 on the US Billboard Afrobeats Songs chart. In 2022, "Watawi" was shortlisted on OkayAfrica Heat of the Week.

=== Deluxe edition ===
On 5 May 2023, CKay released "HALLELUJAH", featuring ex-label mate Blaqbonez, as the first single off the deluxe studio album. On 20 May 2023, "HALLELUJAH" debuted at number 26 on the Billboard U.S. Afrobeats Songs chart. Which eventually earned Blaqbonez his first career debut on the chart. On 5 June 2023, "HALLELUJAH" peaked at number 9 on the Official Nigeria Top 100 chart. On 10 June 2023, he announced #HallelujahOpenVerse challenge and promise to award 2 winners $2500 each.

On 2 June 2023, CKay released "nwayi", as the second single off the deluxe studio album. on 16 June 2023, he released the deluxe studio album for Sad Romance, produced primarily by CKay, along with production from BMH, Sakhile, and Magicsticks. The deluxe edition features guest appearances from Blaqbonez, Joeboy, and Tekno.

== Critical reception ==
Professional ratings
Review scores
Source	Rating
Pulse Nigeria	8.0/10
The Native	7.7/10
Afrocritik	7.1/10

Sad Romance received generally positive reviews from music critics. In a review for Pulse Nigeria, Adeayo Adebiyi said that Sad Romance "is a nice album created with the intention of consolidating CKay's success abroad and reinstating his status has a sound connoisseur in Afrobeats. However, as far as Afrobeats goes, Afro-Emo is not a mainstream sound and it's uncertain just how much this project can change that." In a review for The Native, Dennis Ade Peter said "There will always be a question of whether CKay played it a little too safe on his debut LP, the ultimate context of the album is in its contribution to any mythos the singer and producer might hope to have, beyond the ubiquity of a few singles. Sad Romance doesn't deliver the sort of romance-themed tragedy you might want to glean from the title, just a few tragic moments and more blue-eyed ones that help bolster CKay as one of the best troubadours working in Nigerian pop today." Emmanuel Daraloye of Afrocritik noted that "[a] listen through this LP would obliterate doubts of willful naysayers."

== Track listing ==
Sad Romance standard edition
No.	Title	Writer(s)	Producer(s)	Length
1.	"You"	Chukwuka Ekweani	Christer	2:55
2.	"Mmadu"	Ekweani	CKay; P2J	3:14
3.	"Leave Me Alone"	Ekweani; Abayomi Ilerioluwa; Charlie Handsome; Hoskins	Abayomi Ilerioluwa; Charlie Handsome; Hoskins	2:54
4.	"You Cheated, I Cheated Too"	Ekweani; Abayomi Ilerioluwa; Jonathan Awote-Mensah	Abayomi Ilerioluwa; CKay	2:12
5.	"Come Close" (featuring Ayra Starr)	Ekweani; Oyinkansola Sarah Aderibigbe; Raymond Inana	CKay; Ramoni	3:27
6.	"Watawi" (featuring Davido, Focalistic, and Abidoza)	Ekweani; David Adeleke; Lethabo Sebetso; Amogelang Chabangu	Abidoza	4:48
7.	"Soja"	Ekweani; Osabuohien Osaretin	Sarz	2:50
8.	"Samson and Delilah" (featuring Mayra Andrade)	Ekweani; Mayra Andrade	CKay	3:12
9.	"By Now"	Ekweani; Marcel Akunwata	Blaisebeatz	2:44
10.	"Emiliana"	Ekweani; Bolatito Obisanya	Tempoe; CKay; BMH	2:44
11.	"Lose You" (featuring Ronisia)	Ekweani; Abayomi Ilerioluwa; Le Marabout; Varso; Diakite Mohamed Cedric Malick	Abayomi Ilerioluwa	3:06

Bonus
No.	Title	Writer(s)	Producer(s)	Length
12.	"Love Nwantiti (acoustic version)"	Ekweani	CKay	3:04
Total length:				37:10

=== Sad Romance (Deluxe) ===
Deluxe edition
No.	Title	Writer(s)	Producer(s)	Length
13.	"capture my soul" (featuring Joeboy)	Ekweani; Joseph Akinwale	CKay; BMH	3:31
14.	"nwayi"	Ekweani	CKay; BMH	3:04
15.	"NNEKA" (featuring Tekno)	Ekweani; Augustine Miles Kelechi	Sakhile; CKay	3:15
16.	"HALLELUJAH" (featuring Blaqbonez)	Ekweani; Emeka Akumefule	Magicsticks	2:17
Total length:				12:07

== Accolades ==
Year	Awards ceremony	Category	Result	Ref.
2023	29th South African Music Awards	Rest Of Africa Artist	Nominated	

== Charts ==
Chart performance for Sad Romance
Chart (2022)	Peak position
French Albums (SNEP)	88
Nigeria Albums (TurnTable)	29
Nigeria Alternative Albums (TurnTable)	1
