= Us (Swayvee song) =

2025 single by Swayvee

"US"

Single by Swayvee
- Released: 20 March 2025
- Genre: R&B/Soul, Hip-hop
- Length: 1:16
- Label: Warner Music Africa; Maztreme Inc
- Songwriters: Ezekiel Georgewill; Wisdom Kufreabasi Lazarus
- Producers: Swayvee; ZarriTheMaker

"US" is a song by Nigerian rapper and singer Swayvee. It was released on 20 March 2025 through Maxtreme Inc and Warner Music Africa. "US" peaked at number 15 on TurnTable charts. It also peaked number two spot on Apple Music RnB charts. On Spotify, it reached number one viral 50 in Nigeria.

== Background ==
After Swayvee dropped his two singles. He released his debut single of the year "Us", which was released on 20 March 2025, released through Maxtreme Inc and exclusively distributed by Warner Music Africa. It became a viral sensation on TikTok, and has received over 800,000 posts.

== Composition ==
US is an R&B/Soul genre with a blend of rap and afro-fusion vibes. It’s hook, "You, Me, US" tells a universal story of love and happy moments.

== Credits and personnel ==
Credits adapted from Spotify.

- Swayvee - vocal, songwriting
- Wisdom Kufreabasi Lazarus - songwriting
- Swayvee - production
- ZarrTheMaker - production

== Charts ==
Chart performance for "US"
Chart (2025)	Peak position
Nigeria Top 100 (TurnTable)	15

== Release history ==
Release history and formats for "US"
Region	Date	Format	Label
Various	20 March 2025	Streaming; digital download	Warner Music Africa; Matreme Inc
