= Ukhamba =

Studio album by Inkabi Zezwe
- Released: May 12, 2023
- Recorded: 2022–2023
- Label: Warner Music Africa
- Producer: Xowla; Ruff

Sjava chronology
Isibuko (2023)	Ukhamba (2023)

Big Zulu chronology
Ichwane Lenyoka (2021)	Ukhamba (2023)	Ngises' Congweni (2024)

Ukhamba is the debut studio album by South African duo Inkabi Zezwe, released on May 12, 2023, through Warner Music. It was produced by Xowla and Ruff.

It debuted at number one in both South Africa and Swaziland.

== Background and recording ==
The album is a one-time collaborative album, released under Warner Music. The recording began on the fourth quarter of 2022, recorded in Bergville for entire two weeks.

== Commercial performance ==
Ukhamba debuted number one in South Africa and Swaziland consecutively.

== Accolades ==
At the 18th ceremony of Metro FM Music Awards, Ukhamba received two nominations for Best Produced Album and Best African Pop. In addition, the album received a nomination for Best Afro-Pop album at the 30th ceremony of South African Music Awards.

Year	Nominee / work	Award	Result
2024	Ukhamba	Best African Pop	Nominated
2024	Ukhamba	Best Produced Album	Nominated
2024	Ukhamba	Best Afro-Pop album	Nominated

== Track listing ==
Ukhamba track listing
No.	Title	Length
1.	"Intro (Inkabi Zezwe)"	3:40
2.	"Khaya Lami"	4:16
3.	"Siyabonga"	4:28
4.	"Omunye"	4:46
5.	"Umbayimbayi"	3:50
6.	"Uthando Lunye"	3:51
7.	"Emaphusheni"	3:24
8.	"Slow Jam sase Bergville"	3:00
9.	"Isikhwele"	5:32
10.	"Sayona"	3:48
11.	"Ilanga"	3:34
12.	"Impumelelo"	4:38
Total length:		48:00

== Certifications ==
Region	Certification	Certified units/sales
South Africa (RISA)	Gold	15,000^{‡}
^{‡} Sales+streaming figures based on certification alone.

== Release history ==
Release dates and formats for Ukhamba
Region	Date	Format(s)	Edition(s)	Label	Ref.
South Africa	12 May 2023	Digital download; streaming	Standard	Warner Music	
