= Banger Boy =

BANGER BOY

Studio album by CKay
- Released: August 7, 2026
- Genres: Afrobeats; rock; house; Mara
- Length: 30:58
- Labels: Boyfriend Music; AWAL
- Producers: CKay (exec.); Joseph Salubi (exec.); BMH; Cixxx; Fez; Dj khalipha; vishen (co-prod.)

CKay chronology
CKay the Second (2025)	BANGER BOY (2026)

Singles from BANGER BOY
- 1. "BODY (danz)" Released: 23 October 2025; 2. "BADAMINTON" Released: 30 January 2026; 3. "AFRICAN GIRLS" Released: 22 May 2026

Banger Boy (stylized in all caps) is the third studio album by Nigerian singer CKay. It was released by Boyfriend Music Limited, through CKay Holdings LLC, under an exclusive license of AWAL, on 7 August 2026. The album features guest appearances from Mavo, Kidd Carder, Phyno, Maleek Berry, and King Promise. The album was executive produced by CKay, and Joseph Salubi, with additional production from BMH, CIXXX, DJ Khalipha, FEZ, and Vishen.

Banger Boy is an Afrobeats, rock, and house music album that also incorporates genres such as Mara, a subgenre of Nigeria's street-pop. The album features a darker sound compared to CKay’s other work, with heavy lyrical emphasis on Heartbreak, Healing, and Growth, as described by Desjah Altvater for Ebony.

== Background ==
On 13 March 2026, CKay discussed the categorization of Nigerian music as Afrobeats in an interview with CNN correspondent Larry Madowo. Following the release of his song "Badminton", CKay explained that he viewed the broad use of the term as potentially limiting the diversity of Nigerian music. He described Afrobeats as “a convenient term” but said he had become increasingly aware of the effects of its overgeneralization. In discussing his own approach to music, CKay has used the term “emo-Afrobeats” to describe a style that incorporates emotional songwriting and elements of contemporary Afrobeats.

On 24 May 2026, following the release of "African Girls", CKay fans on X criticised his shift away from the romantic style associated with his earlier work and called for a return to his "lover boy" sound. In response, CKay tweeted: “fela kuti sang about nyash. dont stress me.” His response renewed discussion around the question "Who the F*ck Is CKay?", a phrase first used by Osagie Alonge during an episode of the Loose Talk podcast, with M.I Abaga in 2017. NotJustOk entertainment journalist Onyema Courage later revisited the question, writing that "not even CKay's Fela reference fully answers it."

== Singles ==
"BODY (danz)" featuring Mavo was released as the album's lead single on 23 October 2025, 4 months after the release of his previous project CKay the Second. On 3 November 2025, "BODY (danz)" peaked at number 1 on the official Nigeria Top 100. On 30 January 2026, "BADAMINTON" was released as the second lead single, and on 22 May 2026, "AFRICAN GIRLS" was released as the third lead single, and features Kidd Carder.

== Track listing ==
Banger Boy track listing
No.	Title	Writer(s)	Producer(s)	Length
1.	"NDA"	Chukwuka Ekweani	BMH; Cixxx	2:58
2.	"BODY [danz]" (featuring Mavo)	Ekweani; Oseremen Marvin Ukanigbe	BMH	2:27
3.	"AFRICAN GIRLS" (featuring Kidd Carder)	Ekweani; Oluwatosin Samuel	BMH; Cixxx; Dj khalipha	2:03
4.	"SHEGE"	Chukwuka Ekweani	Cixxx	2:26
5.	"BADAMINTON"	Chukwuka Ekweani	Cixxx; BMH	2:07
6.	"PARA" (with Phyno)	Ekweani; Chibuzor Nelson Azubuike	BMH; Fez	3:23
7.	"PPOWER"	Chukwuka Ekweani	BMH	2:14
8.	"RABA"	Chukwuka Ekweani	BMH	2:22
9.	"SEXY" (with Maleek Berry)	Ekweani; Maleek Shoyebi	BMH	2:31
10.	"ZERO" (with King Promise)	Ekweani; Gregory Newman	BMH; Fez	2:45
11.	"E CLEAR"	Chukwuka Ekweani	BMH; Fez; vishen	2:44
12.	"BYE BYE"	Chukwuka Ekweani	BMH; Fez; vishen	2:58
Total length:				30:58

== Personnel ==
Credits are adapted from Tidal

- Chukwuka Ekweani – primary artist, writer, executive producer, recording (2, 5), mixing (2, 5)
- Joseph Salubi – executive producer
- Mavo - featured artist (2), songwriter (2)
- Kidd Carder - featured artist (3), songwriter (3)
- Phyno - featured artist (6), songwriter (6)
- Maleek Berry - featured artist (9), songwriter (9)
- King Promise - featured artist (10), songwriter (10)
- BMH - production (1-3, 5-12), programming (2, 5), drums (5)
- Cixxx - production (1, 3, 4, 5), recording (1, 3, 6-12), mixing (1, 3, 6-12), guitar (1, 5)
- Dj khalipha - production (3)
- Fez - production (6, 10, 11, 12), piano (2)
- vishen - production (11, 12), guitar (6, 11, 12), whistling (11)
- Stephanie "Astro" Moses - background vocals (2, 11), Guitar (3)
- Gideon Awheela - guitar (8), piano (9)
- Majesty Lyn - background vocals (11)
- CJ Obassey - guitar (10)
- STG - mastering (1, 8)
- Leandro "Dro" Hidalgo - mastering (2, 3, 5-7, 9-12)

== Charts ==
Chart performance
Chart (2026)	Peak position
Nigerian Albums (TurnTable)	62

== Release history ==
Release history and formats for BANGER BOY
Region	Date	Format	Label
Various	7 August 2026	Digital download; streaming	Boyfriend Music; AWAL
