= Water pinch analysis =

Water pinch analysis (WPA) originates from the concept of heat pinch analysis. WPA is a systematic technique for reducing water consumption and wastewater generation through integration of water-using activities or processes. WPA was first introduced by Wang and Smith. Since then, it has been widely used as a tool for water conservation in industrial process plants. Water pinch analysis has recently been applied for urban/domestic buildings. It was extended in 1998 by Nick Hallale at the University of Cape Town, who developed it as a special case of mass exchange networks for capital cost targeting.

Techniques for setting targets for maximum water recovery capable of handling any type of water-using operation including mass-transfer-based and non-mass-transfer based systems include the source and sink composite curves and water cascade analysis (WCA). The source and sink composite curves is a graphical tool for setting water recovery targets as well as for design of water recovery networks.

A 2018 study found by water pinch and water footprint analysis that for bricks with typical materials of clay and shale, the water consumption footprint was 2.02 L of water per brick.

== See also ==
- Hydrogen pinch
- Reclaimed water
