= Industrial and Mining Water Research Unit =

Research entity at the University of Witwatersrand

- Type: Research Entity
- Established: 2011
- Academic staff: 6
- Postgraduates: 30+
- Location: Johannesburg, Gauteng, South Africa; 26°11′35.14″S 28°01′46.95″E
- Campus: East campus

The Industrial and Mining Water Research Unit (abbreviated IMWaRU) was one of several research entities based in the School of Chemical and Metallurgical Engineering at the University of the Witwatersrand, Johannesburg, before merging into the Wits:H2O group. While the name and branding have fallen away, the type of research undertaken continues.

IMWaRU academics continue to provide research as well as supervision to masters and doctorate students within the University, as well as consulting to industry.

== Unit Structure ==
The unit deals with cross disciplinary water issues relating to industry and mining. As such the group includes experts in chemical engineering, microbiology and other sciences.

At the time of the merge, the unit included five NRF rated researchers and over 20 masters and doctoral level postgraduate students in the faculties of engineering and science.

== Members ==
The group currently comprised 7 academics (alphabetically - Mogopoleng (Paul) Chego, Kevin Harding, Michelle Low, Craig Sheridan, Geoffrey Simate, Karl Rumbold and Lizelle van Dyk), as well as several postgraduate students.

== Logo ==
IMWaRU icon

The logo of the Unit is in the shape of a drop of water, with the left half representing the blue of water.

The right half of the drop is modified to show grass and how water is linked to all life. Underneath the icon are the letters IMWaRU, while to the right, the name "Industrial and Mining Water Research Unit" appears.

== Location ==
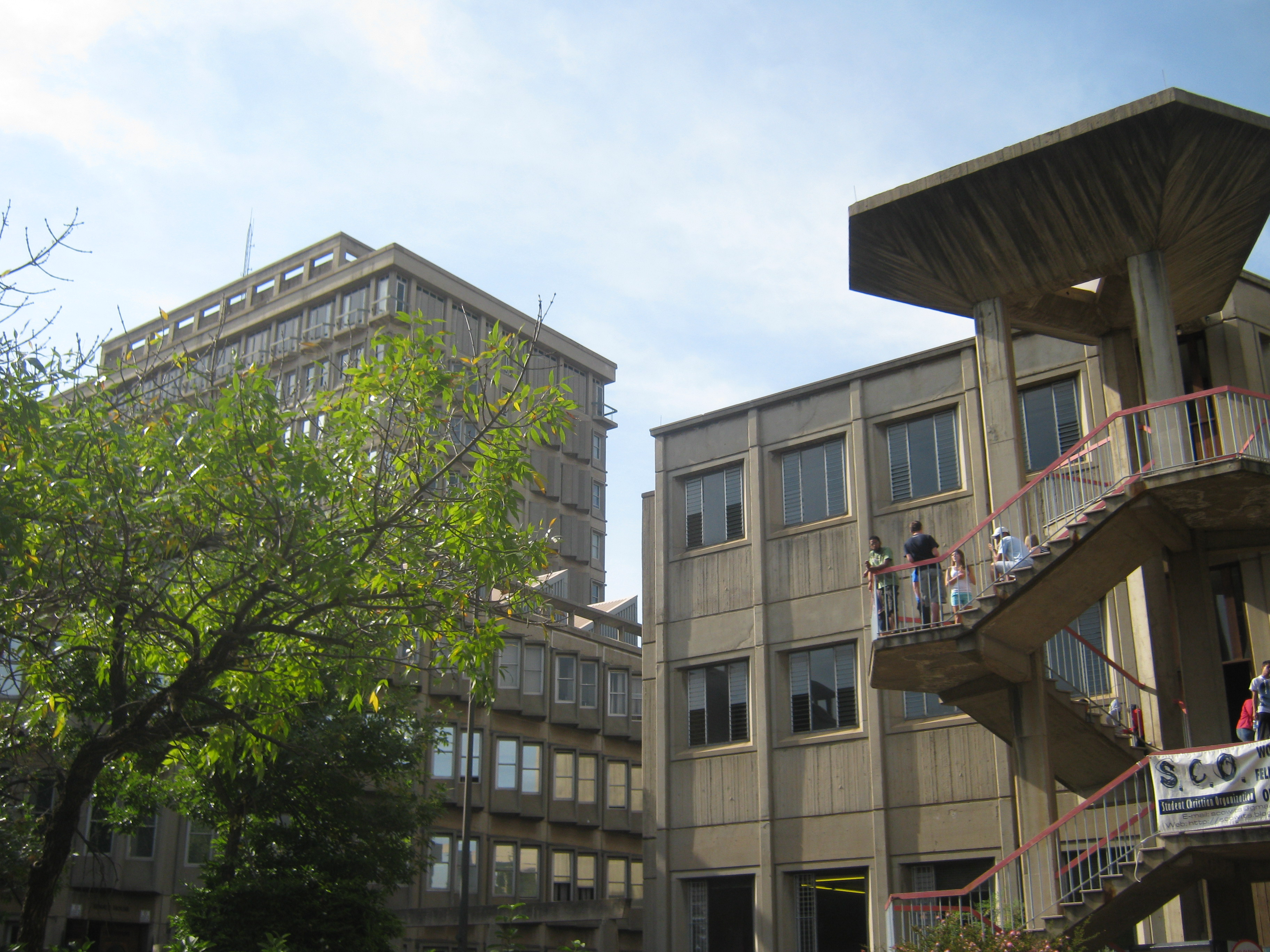
Richard Ward Building, to the right, home to the Industrial and Mining Water Research Unit.

The unit is housed in several buildings across the University, most notably in the Richard Ward Building on East campus. Additionally, some members are located in the Biology Building on East Campus and have access to laboratories in that building.

They also have access to an outdoor facility on West Campus where constructed wetland, and other outdoor, experiments take place.

== Research ==
2nd floor laboratories of the Richard Ward Building, upgraded in 2013 for use by IMWaRU and others.

The group has a broad range of research publications in the areas as listed below:

- Acid mine drainage (AMD) - methods of reducing, treating and managing AMD.
- Algal Studies - including to clean water, and as a source of biomass for biodiesel
- Biorefineries - the use of biomass for values add product, including obtaining these with dual purpose water treatment.
- Constructed wetlands (CW) - waste water remediation through natural biological processes.
- Ecological Engineering - study of creating and sustaining cohabitation conditions for both humans and their environment.
- Grade Engineering
- Industrial biotechnology - the use of biotechnology in water related applications e.g. for water purification and water reduction.
- Industrial Ecology - the use of sustainability principles in reducing environmental impacts; particularly relating to water.
- Life-cycle assessment (LCA) - quantification and minimisation of liquid/solid/gaseous waste at sites which include food processing, industrial bioprocessing and others.
- Material flow analysis
- Membrane technology
- Nanotechnology
- Ozone - determination of optimal treatment techniques for cooling water purification systems, chemical vs ozone.
- Water footprinting (WF) - quantification and minimisation of water use on, amongst others, mine and paper/pulp sites.
- Wastewater treatment
- and more.

== Collaboration ==
The unit works now forms part of WITS:H2O, a cross disciplinary water research think tank.

Active collaboration before joining WITS:H2O included the Schools of Law, Chemistry, Civil and Mining Engineering and the Global Change Institute at the university, in addition to the Helmholtz Centre for Environmental Research in Leipzig, Germany. They have also collaborated with the Universities of Cape Town, Geneva, Queensland and the Pontifical Catholic University of Chile.

IMWaRU has had several Technology Innovation Agency (TIA) projects run through Wits Enterprise.

The unit exhibited with several other groups at Mine Closure 2014.

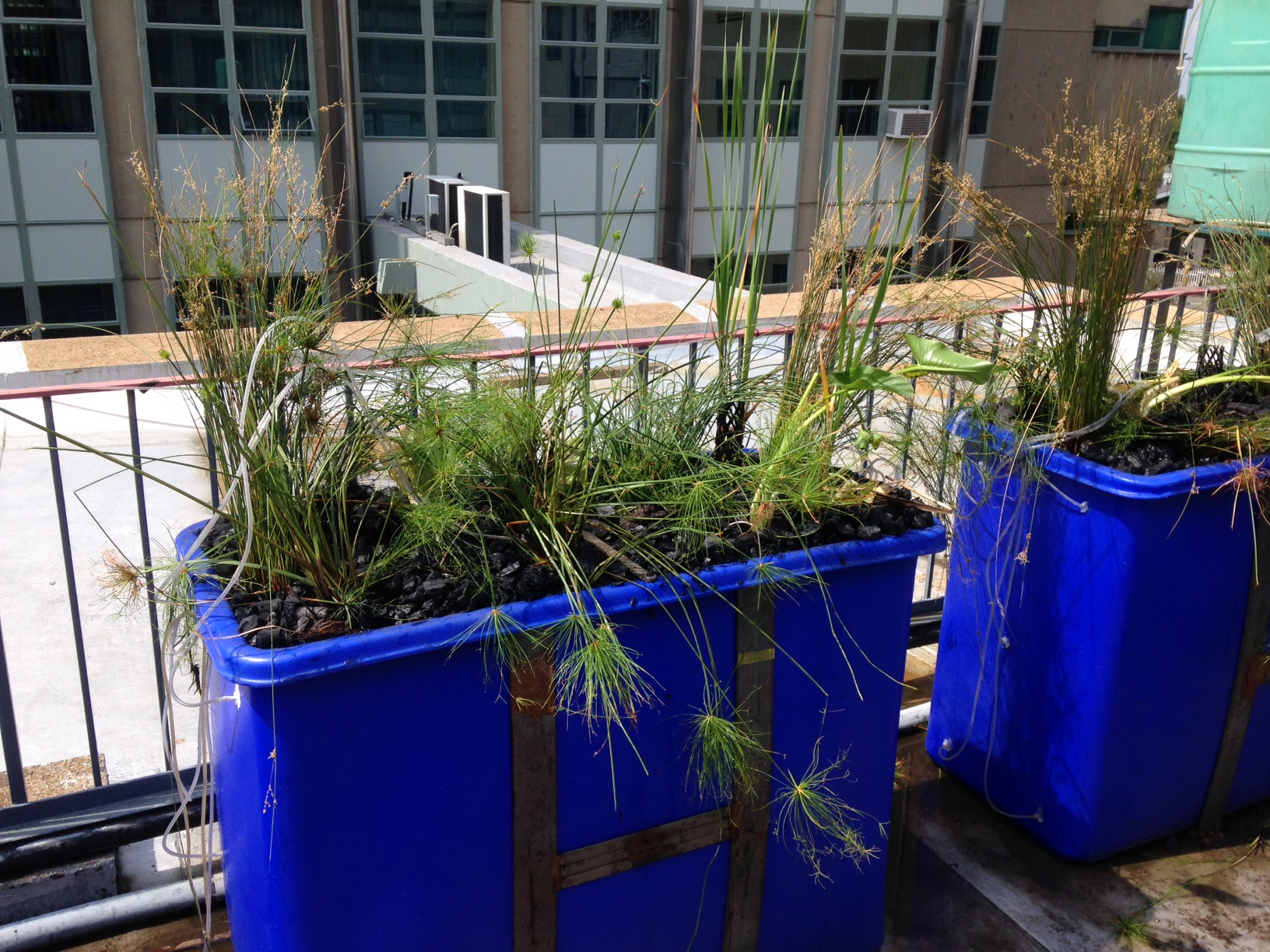
Constructed wetland equipment used in research experiments by the group.

== Awards ==
- The IMWaRU group was awarded a special presentation award at the GAP Bioscience gala dinner in December 2014 for work on remediating AMD using biological substrates.
- Charne Germuizhuizen received the best mine water presentation award, while Mogopoleng (Paul) Chego received the 3rd place best technical talk, at the Water Institute of Southern Africa 2016 (WISA2016) conference in May 2016.
- Tamlyn Naidu won the IOM3 2019 "YOUNG PERSONS' WORLD LECTURE COMPETITION"
