= Umbayimbayi =

Single by Inkabi Zezwe

from the album Ukhamba
- Released: March 24, 2023
- Genre: Afro-pop
- Length: 3:50
- Label: Warner Music Africa
- Songwriters: Jabulani Hadebe; Siyabonga Nene
- Producer: Xowla

"Umbayimbayi" is a debut single by South African duo Inkabi Zezwe released on March 24, 2023, through Warner Music Africa, as album's lead single from debut studio album Ukhamba. Written by Sjava, Big Zulu and production was handled by Xowla.

It debuted number one and number 2 in South Africa and Swaziland consecutively. The song was certified 3× Platinum in South Africa

== Commercial performance ==
The song debuted at number one on iTunes Top 50 & Spotify Top 100 South Africa consecutively. The song reached 3× Platinum in South Africa.

=== Accolades ===
"Umbayimbayi" is nominated for Song of the Year at DStv Content Creator Awards 2023. Also the song earned nomination for Best Voted Song of the Year at 2023 SATMA. In addition, the song received nomination for Motsepe Foundation Record of the Year at the 30th ceremony of South African Music Awards.

Year	Nominee / work	Award	Result	Ref.
2023	"Umbayimbayi"	Song of the Year	Nominated	
2023	"Umbayimbayi"	Most Voted Song of the Year	Nominated	
2024	"Umbayimbayi"	Motsepe Foundation Record of the Year	Nominated	

== Certifications ==
Region	Certification	Certified units/sales
South Africa (RISA)	3× Platinum	60,000^{‡}
^{‡} Sales+streaming figures based on certification alone.

== Track listing ==
- Digital download
1. "Umbayimbayi" (Single Version) – 3:50

== Personnel ==
All credits are adapted from AllMusic.

- Jabulani Hadebe - Composer, Lyricist
- Siyabonga Nene - Composer, Lyricist
- Xowla Shabalala - Composer
- Sjava - Primary Artist, Vocals
- Stallion - Engineer, Producer
- Inkabi Zezwe - Primary Artist
- Big Zulu - Primary Artist, Vocals

== Release history ==
Release history and formats for "Umbayimbayi"
Region	Date	Format	Version	Label	Ref.
South Africa	24 March 2023	Digital download; streaming	Original	Warner	
