= Emiliana (song) =

Single by CKay

from the album Sad Romance
- Released: 3 December 2021
- Length: 2:44
- Label: Warner Music South Africa
- Producers: Tempoe; CKay; BMH

CKay singles chronology
"Love Nwantiti (German remix)" (2021)	"Emiliana" (2021)	"By Your Side" (2021)

"Emiliana" is a song by Nigerian singer and songwriter CKay, released on 3 December 2021, by Warner Music South Africa.

== Background ==
On 4 December 2021, CKay performed a live version of "Emiliana" at The Tonight Show Starring Jimmy Fallon.

== Commercial performance ==
"Emiliana" peaked at number one for 7 consecutive weeks on the UK Afrobeats Singles Chart. On 6 December 2021, it was named song of the day by The Native, and debuted at number forty-four on TurnTable Top 50 on 13 December. On 16 December, it peaked at number forty-one on TurnTable Top 50 streaming songs chart. On 24 December, it peaked at number thirty-nine on TurnTable Top 50 Airplay chart.

== Credits and personnel ==
Credits adapted from Genius.

- CKay – vocals, songwriting, production, mixing engineer
- Oboratare Abraham – additional vocals
- Bmh – songwriting, production, mixing engineer

== Charts ==
=== Weekly charts ===
Weekly chart performance for "Emiliana"
Chart (2021–2022)	Peak position
Belgium (Ultratop 50 Wallonia)	29
Czech Republic Airplay (ČNS IFPI)	12
France (SNEP)	9
Global 200 (Billboard)	176
Hungary (Single Top 40)	26
Luxembourg (Billboard)	20
Netherlands (Single Top 100)	21
Nigeria (TurnTable Top 50)	5
Portugal (AFP)	137
Suriname (Nationale Top 40)	3
Sweden (Sverigetopplistan)	90
Switzerland (Schweizer Hitparade)	27
UK Afrobeats Singles (OCC)	1
US Afrobeats Songs (Billboard)	10

=== Year-end charts ===
2022 year-end chart performance for "Emiliana"
Chart (2022)	Position
Belgium (Ultratop 50 Wallonia)	76
Netherlands (Single Top 100)	80
Switzerland (Schweizer Hitparade)	65
US Afrobeats Songs (Billboard)	19

== Certifications ==
Certifications for "Emiliana"
Region	Certification	Certified units/sales
Canada (Music Canada)	Gold	40,000^{‡}
France (SNEP)	Diamond	333,333^{‡}
Netherlands (NVPI)	Gold	40,000^{‡}
United Kingdom (BPI)	Silver	200,000^{‡}
^{‡} Sales+streaming figures based on certification alone.

== Release history ==
Release history for "Emiliana"
Region	Date	Format	Label	Ref.
Various	3 December 2021	Digital download; streaming	Warner Music South Africa	
