= Watawi =

Single by CKay featuring Davido, Focalistic, and Abidoza

from the album Sad Romance
- Released: 17 June 2022
- Genre: Amapiano
- Length: 4:48
- Label: Warner Music Africa
- Songwriters: Chukwuka Ekweani; David Adeleke; Lethabo Sebetso; Amogelang Chabangu
- Producer: Abidoza

CKay singles chronology
| "Maria" (2022) | "Watawi" (2022) | "you" (2022) |

Davido singles chronology
| "Mwen Love Ou" (2022) | "Watawi" (2022) | "Showing Off Her Body" (2022) |

Focalistic singles chronology
| "3310" (2022) | "Watawi" (2022) | "Danko (Remix)" (2022) |

Abidoza singles chronology
| "Miss My Loving" (2022) | "Watawi" (2022) | "The Streets" (2022) |

Music video
- "Watawi" on YouTube

"Watawi" is a song by Nigerian singer and songwriter CKay, featuring fellow Nigerian singer Davido, alongside a South African rapper Focalistic, and record producer Abidoza. It was released on 17 June 2022, by Warner Music Africa. "Watawi" was written by CKay, Davido, Focalistic, and Abidoza, who also produced the song. Its release was accompanied by a music video directed by Dalia Dias. It debuted at number 13 on the TurnTable Top 50, number 21 on the US Billboard Afrobeats Songs chart, and number 6 on the UK Afrobeats Singles Chart.

On 21 June 2022, The Fader music editor, Jordan Darville, gave an illustration of the definition of "Watawi", it being slang for "What Are We?". The music editor further wrote, "A lot of people have been in tricky situations when their 'situationship' attempts to push things further than it needs to be". On 22 June 2022, CKay performed "Watawi" for the first time in Paris, France.

== Music video ==
On 17 June 2022, the song's music video was released. It was directed by Dalia Dias, and shot in South Africa.

== Commercial performance ==
"Watawi" peaked at number 6 on the UK Afrobeats Singles Chart. On 28 June 2022, it debuted at number 13 on the Nigeria TurnTable Top 50. "Watawi" also peaked at number 11 on TurnTable Top 50 streaming songs chart, and TurnTable Top 50 Airplay chart. On 28 June 2022, it debuted at number 21 on the US Billboard Afrobeats Songs chart. "Watawi" has received one million Boomplay streams, and 1.2 million Spotify streams as of 29 June 2022. In 2022, "Watawi" was shortlisted on OkayAfrica Heat of the Week.

== Credits and personnel ==
- CKay – vocals, songwriting, production
- Davido – vocals, songwriting
- Focalistic – vocals, songwriting
- Abidoza - songwriting, production

== Charts ==
Weekly chart performance for "Watawi"
| Chart (2022) | Peak position |
|---|---|
| Nigeria Top 50 (TurnTable) | 10 |
| UK Afrobeats (OCC) | 6 |
| US Afrobeats Songs (Billboard) | 21 |

== Release history ==
Release history for "Watawi"
| Region | Date | Format(s) | Label | Ref. |
|---|---|---|---|---|
| Various | 17 June 2022 | Digital download; streaming | Warner Music Africa | |
