= Thokozani Majozi =

South African engineer (born 1972)

Thokozani Majozi OMB
- Born: 3 October 1972 (age 54); KwaMashu, South Africa
- Occupations: Professor, School of Chemical and Metallurgical Engineering, Witwatersrand University; Dean, Faculty of Engineering and the Built Environment, Witwatersrand University
- Title: South African Research Chair in Sustainable Process Engineering

Academic background
- Education: University of Natal; University of Manchester Institute of Science and Technology

Academic work
- Discipline: Chemical engineering
- Sub-discipline: Process engineering
- Institutions: Witwatersrand University (2013–present); University of Pretoria (2004–2013); University of Pannonia (2005–2009)
- Main interests: Batch chemical process integration; waste minimisation

Thokozani Majozi OMB (born 3 October 1972) is a South African chemical engineer. He has been the Dean of Engineering and the Built Environment at the University of the Witwatersrand since 2021. He holds the South African Research Chair in Sustainable Process Engineering at the same university. His research focuses on chemical process engineering, particularly batch chemical process integration.

Majozi joined the University of the Witwatersrand's School of Chemical and Metallurgical Engineering as a professor in 2013. Before that he worked at the University of Pretoria from 2004 to 2013 and at the University of Pannonia from 2005 to 2009.

== Early life and education ==
Majozi was born in 1972 in KwaMashu in present-day KwaZulu-Natal. His mother was a teacher and his father was a post office clerk. He attended Mqhawe High School in nearby Inanda, and he matriculated as the top achiever in the province. Although he had initially planned to become a medical doctor, he received a bursary from Anglo American to study engineering. He completed a BScEng in chemical engineering at the University of Natal in 1994.

In 1994, as dictated by his bursary obligations, he began his professional career as a junior process engineer at Unilever. Thereafter he joined Dow AgroSciences as a senior process engineer in 1996, specialising in competency improvement. While at Dow he met Professor Chris Buckley of the University of Natal's Pollution Research Group, who suggested that Majozi should return to the university for postgraduate study; under Buckley's supervision, he completed an MScEng in 1998.

In 1999, Majozi moved to Manchester, England to study at the University of Manchester Institute of Science and Technology on a Commonwealth Scholarship. He completed his PhD in process integration in 2002. Later the same year he joined Sasol Technology as technical leader for optimisation and integration; he worked there until he joined academia in 2004.

== Academic career ==
In 2004, Majozi was appointed as an associate professor of chemical engineering at the University of Pretoria. His research was initially supported by Water Research Commission funds given to Buckley, who transferred them to Majozi. He was tenured as a full professor at the University of Pretoria in 2008, and in parallel, from 2005 to 2009, he was an associate professor of computer science at the University of Pannonia in Veszprém, Hungary. Later, from 2009 to 2012, he was the vice-president of the Engineering Council of South Africa.

After nine years at the University of Pretoria, Majozi moved to the University of the Witwatersrand (Wits) in 2013, becoming a professor in the Wits School of Chemical and Metallurgical Engineering. There he took up the South African Research Chair in Sustainable Process Engineering, with the joint sponsorship of the Department of Science and Technology and the National Research Foundation. In addition, he was appointed as board chairperson of the Council for Scientific and Industrial Research in 2015.

On 23 September 2021, the Wits Council approved Majozi's appointment to a five-year term as Dean of the Faculty of Engineering and the Built Environment. He succeeded Professor Ian Jandrell in that position.

== Scholarship and research ==
Majozi's main research interest is batch chemical process integration. He has focused in particular on the minimisation of industrial wastewater in batch processing; he was the first person to apply water minimisation techniques in batch plants. The National Research Foundation rated him as a B1-level researcher.

== Honours and awards ==
Majozi has received three National Science and Technology Forum awards. He also received the University of Pretoria's Leading Minds Centenary Award in 2008, the S2A3 British Association Silver Medal in 2008, the National Research Foundation's President Award in 2007 and 2009, and the South African Institution of Chemical Engineers Bill Neal-May Gold Award in 2010. In 2021 the Water Research Commission gave him a Water Research Legends Award.

On 25 April 2019, South African President Cyril Ramaphosa admitted him to the Order of Mapungubwe. He received the award in Bronze for:

His outstanding contribution to science, particularly the development of a novel mathematical technique for near-zero-effluent batch chemical facilities which enables the reuse of wastewater; as a young scientist, more trailblazing is expected of him in the years ahead.

Majozi is also a member of the Academy of Science of South Africa, and he is a fellow of the African Academy of Sciences, the South African Academy of Engineering, the Water Institute of Southern Africa, and the Institution of Chemical Engineers. He is an alumnus of the Global Young Academy.
