= Pinch analysis =

Method in chemical engineering

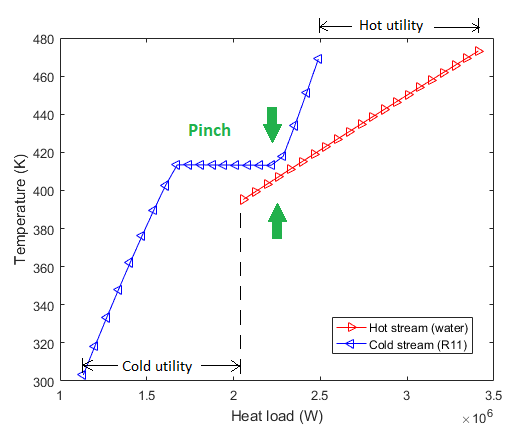
Temperature vs. heat load diagram of hot stream (H_{2}O entering at 20 bar, 473.15 K, and 4 kg/s) and cold stream (R-11 entering at 18 bar, 303.15 K, and 5 kg/s) in a counter-flow heat exchanger. "Pinch" is the point of closest approach between the hot and cold streams in the T vs. H diagram. Note: this diagram is incorrect; the hot stream should lie above and to the left of the cold stream.

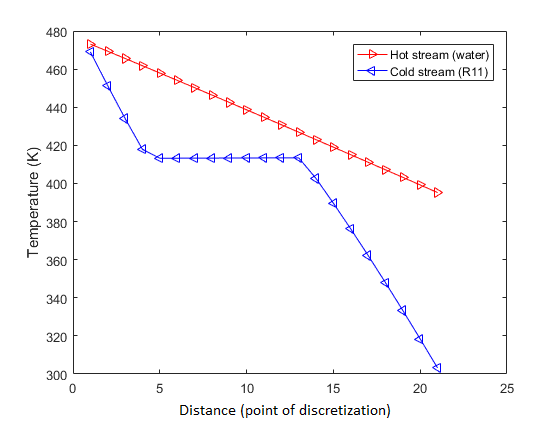
Temperature profiles (temperature vs. distance diagram) of hot stream (flowing from left to right) and cold stream (flowing from right to left) in counter-flow heat exchanger of above case.

Pinch analysis is a methodology for minimising energy consumption of chemical processes by calculating thermodynamically feasible energy targets (or minimum energy consumption) and achieving them by optimising heat recovery systems, energy supply methods and process operating conditions. It is also known as process integration, heat integration, energy integration or pinch technology.

The process data is represented as a set of energy flows, or streams, as a function of heat load (product of specific enthalpy and mass flow rate; SI unit W) against temperature (SI unit K). These data are combined for all the streams in the plant to give composite curves, one for all hot streams (releasing heat) and one for all cold streams (requiring heat). The point of closest approach between the hot and cold composite curves is the pinch point (or just pinch) with a hot stream pinch temperature and a cold stream pinch temperature. This is where the design is most constrained. Hence, by finding this point and starting the design there, the energy targets can be achieved using heat exchangers to recover heat between hot and cold streams in two separate systems, one for temperatures above pinch temperatures and one for temperatures below pinch temperatures. In practice, during the pinch analysis of an existing design, often cross-pinch exchanges of heat are found between a hot stream with its temperature above the pinch and a cold stream below the pinch. Removal of those exchangers by alternative matching makes the process reach its energy target.

== History ==
In 1971, Ed Hohmann stated in his PhD thesis that

one can compute the least amount of hot and cold utilities required for a process without knowing the heat exchanger network that could accomplish it. One also can estimate the heat exchange area required

In late 1977, Ph.D. student Bodo Linnhoff under the supervision of Dr John Flower at the University of Leeds showed the existence in many processes of a heat integration bottleneck, ‘the pinch’, which laid the basis for the technique, known today as pinch-analysis. At that time he had joined Imperial Chemical Industries (ICI) where he led practical applications and further method development.

Bodo Linnhoff developed the 'Problem Table', an algorithm for calculating the energy targets and worked out the basis for a calculation of the surface area required, known as ‘the spaghetti network’. These algorithms enabled practical application of the technique.

In 1982 he joined University of Manchester Institute of Technology (UMIST, present day University of Manchester) to continue the work. In 1983 he set up a consultation firm known as Linnhoff March International later acquired by KBC Energy Services.

Many refinements have been developed since and used in a wide range of industries, including extension to heat and power systems and non-process situations. The most detailed explanation of the techniques is by Linnhoff et al. (1982), Shenoy (1995), Kemp (2006) and Kemp and Lim (2020), while Smith (2005) includes several chapters on them. Both detailed and simplified (spreadsheet) programs are now available to calculate the energy targets. See Pinch Analysis Software below.

Pinch analysis has been extended beyond energy applications. It now includes:

- Mass Exchange Networks
- Water pinch
- Hydrogen pinch
- Carbon pinch

== Weaknesses ==
Classical pinch-analysis primarily calculates the energy costs for the heating and cooling utility. At the pinch point, where the hot and cold streams are the most constrained, large heat exchangers are required to transfer heat between the hot and cold streams. Large heat exchangers entail high investment costs. In order to reduce capital cost, in practice a minimum temperature difference (Δ T) at the pinch point is demanded, e.g., 10 °F. It is possible to estimate the heat exchanger area and capital cost, and hence the optimal Δ T minimum value. However, the cost curve is quite flat and the optimum may be affected by "topology traps". The pinch method is not always appropriate for simple networks or where severe operating constraints exist. Kemp (2006) and Kemp and Lim (2019) discuss these aspects in detail.

== Recent developments ==
The problem of integrating heat between hot and cold streams, and finding the optimal network, in particular in terms of costs, may today be solved with numerical algorithms. The network can be formulated as a so-called mixed integer non-linear programming (MINLP) problem and solved with an appropriate numerical solver. Nevertheless, large-scale MINLP problems can still be hard to solve for today's numerical algorithms. Alternatively, some attempts were made to formulate the MINLP problems to mixed integer linear problems, where then possible networks are screened and optimized. For simple networks of a few streams and heat exchangers, hand design methods with simple targeting software are often adequate, and aid the engineer in understanding the process.

== See also ==
- CHP Directive – EU Directive on cogeneration of heat and power
- Energy policy of the European Union – Legislation in the area of energetics in the European Union
- Relative cost of electricity generated by different sources – Comparison of costs of different electricity generation sources
- Cogeneration – Simultaneous generation of electricity and useful heat
- Process flowsheeting
