= David Glasser =

(b.1936) South African chemical engineer

- Born: 26 September 1936 (age 90); Alexandria, Eastern Cape, South Africa
- Education: University of Cape Town; Imperial College London
- Known for: Attainable region theory
- Spouse: Sylvia
- Children: Nadine; Benjamin John
- Scientific career
- Fields: Chemical engineering
- Workplaces: University of the Witwatersrand; University of South Africa
- Thesis: Some Kinetic Problems in Oxidation Chain Reactions (1964)

David Glasser FRSSAf (born 29 September 1936) is a South African engineer best known for his co-development of attainable region theory and research into improving the efficiency of chemical processes. In 2001 he was the inaugural recipient of the Harry Oppenheimer Fellowship Award. He has also been awarded the Bill-Neale May Gold Medal by the South African Institute of Chemical Engineers, as well as the Science for Society Gold Medal from the Academy of Science of South Africa.

He currently works as Professor Extraordinarius of the University of South Africa (UNISA) and resides in Australia.

== Biography ==
Glasser was born in Alexandria in the Eastern Cape province of South Africa. He attended St Andrews School in Bloemfontein and Grey High School in Port Elizabeth. He obtained a B.Eng (chemical) from the University of Cape Town in 1958 and a PhD from Imperial College of Science, Technology and Medicine in London in 1964. He returned to South Africa and joined the University of the Witwatersrand (WITS) as a lecturer later in 1964. His research work at WITS encompassed kinetics, thermodynamics, modelling and optimisation.

In conjunction with Diane Hildebrandt and Martin Feinberg, he developed a new method for optimising chemical reactors called attainable region theory. It has been applied to many fields including biomedical research in the interpretation of imaging experiments, the removal of heparin from blood and the development of an artificial liver.

He also did research in the field of process synthesis, where carbon dioxide emissions could be minimised and raw materials efficiently used through the re-designing of chemical plant flow-sheets based on fundamental thermodynamic processes.

Glasser has published more than 300 publications, in peer-reviewed publications including the AIChE Journal, Chemical Engineering Science, Industrial and Engineering Research, as well as 4 books. He served as editor and reviewer for many journals over the period 1998 - 2003. He was Editor-in-Chief of the book Series on Chemical Engineering and Technology, published by Kluwer Academic Publishers of the Netherlands. In 2011 he coauthored the book Membrane Process Design Using Residue Curve Maps.

He holds four patents, including patents for improving chemical plant efficiency, improving carbon efficiencies in hydrocarbon production and the production of synthesis gas.

Although he retired in 2004, he continued to supervise research students, develop and teach post-graduate courses, oversaw research contracts, and continued to publish academic papers. He mentored more than 50 MSc students and 52 PhD students during his time at WITS.

In 2015, Glasser relocated to Australia to live with his grandchildren. He continues to work as Professor Extraordinarius of UNISA (a "rare, non-tenured position for scholars who have achieved academic excellence and are recognised as global leaders in their fields.")

In 2016 he co-authored Attainable Region Theory: An introduction to choosing an optimal reactor (Wiley USA 2016).

=== Transformation ===
Glasser's period as Dean at WITS coincided with a period of political change in South Africa. He was pivotal in developing promising young students from disadvantaged backgrounds with the intention of increasing numbers and success rates. The Anglo-American cadet scheme, a year-long programme for young black engineering students prior to university entrance which prepared them to excel at university, was taken over by the engineering department of WITS under Glasser.

== Awards, recognition, memberships ==
- Fellow of the Royal Society of South Africa (1997)
- Associate Editor of the Chemical Engineering Journal (1980-2002)
- Editor of the Kluwer international book series on chemical engineering (1988-2003)
- Bill Neale-May Gold Medal from the South African Institution of Chemical Engineering (2000)
- Inaugural Harry Oppenheimer Memorial Gold Medal (2001)
- Science-for-Society Gold Medal from the Academy of Science of South Africa (2006)
- “Lifetime Achievement Award” from the National Science and Technology Forum (2012)
- Fellow of the South African Academy of Engineering
- President of the South African Institute of Chemical Engineering
- Founder and director of the Centre of Material and Process Synthesis at WITS
- Fellow of the South African Institute of Chemical Engineering
- Dean of the Faculty of Engineering at Wits University (1986-1989)
- Elected Senate Member on the Council of the University of the Witwatersrand in 1987
- Visiting professor at City College of New York, USA
- Visiting professor at the University of Houston, USA
- Visiting professor at the University of Waterloo, Canada
- Hooker Distinguished Visiting Professor at McMaster University, Canada
- Fulbright Scholar at Princeton University, USA
- Visiting scholar at the University of Sydney, Australia
- Four consecutive A1 ratings from the National Research Foundation
