= Tugela Ferry =

- Location within KwaZulu-Natal Location within South Africa
- Coordinates: 28°44′S 30°26′E
- Country: South Africa
- Province: KwaZulu-Natal
- District: Umzinyathi
- Municipality: Msinga

Area
  - Total: 4.11 km^{2} (1.59 sq mi)
- Elevation: 777 m (2,549 ft)

Population (2011)
  - Total: 2,093
  - Density: 509/km^{2} (1,320/sq mi)

Racial makeup (2011)
  - Black African: 97.2%
  - Coloured: 0.7%
  - Indian/Asian: 0.2%
  - White: 1.9%

First languages (2011)
  - Zulu: 95.4%
  - English: 1.9%
  - Other: 2.7%
- Time zone: UTC+2 (SAST)
- PO box: 3010
- Area code: 033

Tugela Ferry is a town on the northern bank of the Tugela River, in central KwaZulu-Natal, South Africa. During the apartheid era it formed part of the KwaZulu homeland, and at present it is included in the Umzinyathi District Municipality. The town's name commemorates the ferry which once operated here before a steel bridge was constructed.

The town's hospital (Church of Scotland Hospital) is renowned for having discovered the first XDR-TB outbreak in 2005.

== Notable people ==
- Simmy - South African Music singer-songwriter.

== Notes ==
Nedy one of the locals
