= Hydrogen pinch =

Petrochemical process optimization method

Hydrogen pinch analysis (HPA) is a hydrogen management method that originates from the concept of heat pinch analysis. HPA is a systematic technique for reducing hydrogen consumption and hydrogen generation through integration of hydrogen-using activities or processes in the petrochemical industry, petroleum refineries hydrogen distribution networks and hydrogen purification.

== Principle ==
A mass analysis is done by representing the purity and flowrate for each stream from the hydrogen consumers (sinks), such as hydrotreaters, hydrocrackers, isomerization units and lubricant plants and the hydrogen producers (sources), such as hydrogen plants and naphtha reformers, streams from hydrogen purifiers, membrane reactors, pressure swing adsorption and continuous distillation and off-gas streams from low- or high-pressure separators. The source-demand diagram shows bottlenecks, surplus or shortages. The hydrogen pinch is the purity at which the hydrogen network has neither hydrogen surplus nor deficit.

After the analysis REFOPT from the Centre for Process Integration at The University of Manchester is used as a tool for process integration with which the process is optimized. The methodology was also developed into commercial software by companies such as Linnhoff March and AspenTech. The Aspen product incorporated the work of Nick Hallale (formerly a lecturer at University of Manchester) and was the first method to consider multiple components, rather than a pseudo-binary mixture of hydrogen and methane.

== History ==
The first assessment based on cost and value composite curves of hydrogen resources of a hydrogen network was proposed by Tower et al. (1996). Alves developed the hydrogen pinch analysis approach based on the concept of heat pinch analysis in 1999. Nick Hallale and Fang Liu extended this original work, adding pressure constraints and mathematical programming for optimisation. This was followed by developments at AspenTech, producing commercial software for industrial application.

== See also ==
- Water Pinch
- Timeline of hydrogen technologies
- Review of process integration by Nick Hallale (University of Manchester) covering hydrogen pinch
