= Global Change Institute =

Institute in Witwatersrand, Johannesburg

Global Change and Sustainability Institute (GCSRI)
- Type: Institute
- Location: Johannesburg, Gauteng, South Africa
- Website: GCI Homepage

The Global Change Institute (abbreviated GCI) (formerly known as the Global Change and Sustainability Institute - GSCRI) is one of several institutes at the University of the Witwatersrand, Johannesburg. It "was established as an enabling research platform of global significance and local impact, fostering informed action for adaptation and innovation in the rapidly changing southern African region".

Collaborators include the Industrial and Mining Water Research Unit, amongst others.
