= Inkabi Zezwe =

South African musical duo

- Genres: Afro-soul, Afro pop
- Years active: 2022–present
- Label: Warner Music Africa
- Members: Sjava; Big Zulu

Inkabi Zezwe is a South African duo composed of Sjava and Big Zulu formed in 2022. Their debut single "Umbayimbayi", charted number 1 and certified 4× Platinum in South Africa.

Their debut studio album Ukhamba (2023), debuted number 1 in two countries South Africa and Eswatini consecutively.

== History ==
=== 2022-present: Inkabi Zezwe formation, Ukhamba ===
Inkabi Zezwe composed of Sjava (born Jabulani Hadebe) and Big Zulu (Siyabonga Nene) was formed in 2022 and signed a recording deal with Warner Music for their one time collaborative album.

On March 17, 2023, Big Zulu and Sjava announced the working on their joint album Ukhamba. "Umbayimbayi" was released on March 24, 2023, as album's lead single. The song debuted at number one on iTunes Top 50 & Spotify Top 100 South Africa consecutively. The song reached 3× Platinum in South Africa.

On April 1, Zulu announced that the Inkabi Zezwe tour will run from June until September 2023.

Their debut studio album was released on May 12, 2023. It debuted number one in two countries South Africa and Eswatini consecutively. On 15 July 2023, Warner Music Africa announces a partnership with Lacuna Creative Studios, to oversee the post-production of Inkabi Zezwe six-part documentary series of the making of Sjava and Big Zulu’s Ukhamba studio album.

== Discography ==
- Ukhamba (2023)

== Awards ==
=== Content Creator Awards ===
| Year | Nominee / work | Award | Result | Ref. |
|---|---|---|---|---|
| 2023 | "Umbayimbayi" | Song of the Year | Nominated | |

=== Metro FM Awards ===
| Year | Nominee / work | Award | Result | Ref. |
|---|---|---|---|---|
| 2024 | Ukhamba | Best African Pop | Nominated | |
| 2024 | Ukhamba | Best Produced Album | Nominated | |
| 2024 | "Umbayimbayi" | Best Collaboration | Nominated | |
| 2024 | Themselves | Best Duo/Group | Nominated | |

=== South African Traditional and Music Awards ===
| Year | Nominee / work | Award | Result | Ref. |
|---|---|---|---|---|
| 2023 | "Umbayimbayi" | Most Voted Song of the Year | Nominated | |

=== South African Music Awards ===
| Year | Nominee / work | Award | Result | Ref. |
|---|---|---|---|---|
| 2024 | "Umbayimbayi" | Motsepe Foundation Record of the Year | Nominated | |
| 2024 | Ukhamba | Best Afro-Pop album | Nominated | |
