= Elias Sime =

Ethiopian artist (born 1968)

- Born: 1968 (age 57–58); Addis Ababa, Ethiopia
- Education: Addis Ababa University, Alle School of Fine Arts
- Notable work: Tightrope series
- Movement: Contemporary art
- Spouse: Meskerem Assegued

Elias Sime (Amharic: ኤልያስ ስሜ, 1968, Addis Ababa, Ethiopia) is a world-renowned Ethiopian visual artist and sculptor who works with industrial materials and electronic detritus, or "e-waste") such as microchips, power cords, computers, and other discarded components and residues from tech manufactures.

== Life and education ==
Elias Sime graduated from the Addis Ababa University Alle School of Fine Arts and Design in 1990. He co-founded the Zoma Contemporary Art Center, with his creative partner, curator, and anthropologist Meskerem Assegued, an exhibition venue and artist-in-residence space in Addis Ababa.

== Work ==
Elias Sime's work is recognized by the use of e-waste, the tech industry waste, found and acquired in Addis Ababa’s Mercato market—the biggest open-air market in Africa and where most of the tech materials from the West is passed along through a global network of moving goods. The numerous keyboards, microchips, copper electrical wires, batteries, pieces of screens and older-generation computers found in Sime's large-scale wall installations originates from the Mercato market.

The solo exhibition Elias Sime: Tightrope,' curated by Tracy L. Adler, the first exhibition survey on his work featuring man-made tech and industrial materials, was organized by the Ruth and Elmer Wellin Museum of Art at Hamilton College, Clinton, NY in 2019 and traveled to the Akron Art Museum in Akron, Ohio; the Kemper Museum of Contemporary Art in Kansas City, Missouri; and the Royal Ontario Museum in Toronto, Canada from 2020-2021.

In 2024, the solo show Elias Sime: Dichotomy ፊት አና ጀርባ as part of the events surrounding the 60th Venice Biennale, Italy, comments on the human use of technological resources, the material waste by Western culture, and the constant overlooked conditions in which these materials are discarded.

== Collections ==
Elias Sime's work is included in the collections of the Pérez Art Museum Miami, Florida; the Metropolitan Museum of Art, New York; the North Carolina Museum of Art, North Carolina; and the Saint Louis Art Museum, Missouri; among others.
