= Water cascade analysis =

Water cascade analysis (WCA) is a technique to calculate the minimum flowrate target for feedwater and wastewater for continuous water-using processes.

== Principle ==
It is a tabular and numerical alternative to the water surplus diagram in Water Pinch which can be used to identify opportunities for reduction in feedwater usage and the design of water distribution networks. The WCA is done in three steps, a global analysis of water distribution and consumption in the network, establishing baseline minimum water targets and redesign of the water network to achieve these targets.

== History ==
WCA was first introduced by Manan, Tan and Foo in 2004. Since then, it has been widely used as a tool for water conservation in industrial process plants. A Time dependent water cascade analysis was presented later on. A variation of the WCA is the gas cascade analysis (GCA).

== See also ==
- Reclaimed water
