= BMH (music producer) =

Nigerian record producer

- Born: Bolatito Obisanya; 28 January 1999 (age 27); Lagos, Nigeria
- Origin: Lagos State
- Genres: Pop music; Afro pop music; Afropiano
- Occupation: Record producer
- Years active: 2019–present

Bolatito Obisanya (born January 28, 1999) known professionally as BMH (BURSTMYHEAD) is a Nigerian record producer, composer and sound Engineer. His stage name BMH which also serves as his producer tag BURSTMYHEAD! He made his global mainstream debut when he produced CKay’s hit song "Emiliana" which peaked at number one for 7 consecutive weeks on the UK Afrobeats Singles Chart. and named song of the day by The Native,

== Early life ==
Bolatito was born January 28, in Alapere, Ketu, Lagos State, Nigeria. His dad is a pastor at The Redeemed evangelical Ministry (TREM) Bolatito began his musical career in the choir and as a church drummer, he started as a rapper and songwriter before going into music production.

== Career ==
BMH started gaining recognition after co-producing DTF and Felony on CKay the First EP by CKay, which peaked at number 3 on the US Billboard World charts In December 2021, he then went on collaborate with Ckay again to create "Emiliana", their global hit record, where he was credited as songwriter, producer, and mixing engineer. He was nominated as Producer of the Year for 2022 AFRIMA Awards. He has production credits for artists such as ElGrande Toto, Blaqbonez, Ayra Starr, Crayon, Whoisakin, Mayorkun, EJOYA'23. In August 2023, he officially received his France Diamond certification plaque for production credits on Emiliana.

== Production discography ==
=== Singles produced ===
Artiste	Title	Reference
CKay	"Emiliana"	
ElGrande Toto feat. Ayra Starr	"Comforter"	
CKay	"Felony"	
Blaqbonez	"Star Life"	
CKay	"DTF"	
Khaid	"Jolie"	
Crayon	"Adey"	
Mayorkun	"Loose control"	
Mayorkun	"Thermo"	
Khaid	"Jolie"	
Tariq	"Bad intentions"	
Whoisakin	"Superman"	
Ejoya'23	"Canabi"	
Whoisakin	"+234"	

== Awards and nominations ==
Year	Event	Prize	Recipient	Result	Ref(s)
2022	AFRIMA	Producer of the year	BMH	Nominated	
