= Majozi =

Majozi is a surname. Notable people with the surname include:

- Lucas Majozi (1916–1969), South African soldier
- Sho Madjozi, South African rapper
- Thokozani Majozi (born 1972), South African chemical engineer
- Zandile Majozi, South African politician
