= Bodo Linnhoff =

German chemical engineer and academic (born 1948)

Professor Bodo Linnhoff (born 1948) is a chemical engineer and academic who developed Pinch Analysis, a methodology for minimising energy usage in the process industries. A first trial at ICI improved design on a refinery expansion which saved £1 million per year in energy, and subsequent examination of plants believed to be optimised averaged a 30% energy saving.

== Life ==
Born in Berlin, Germany, Linnhoff studied at Technical University of Hannover, Germany and ETH Zurich, Switzerland (MSc in mechanical engineering). He taught at ETH until 1974 when he went to University of Leeds, UK, as a British Council Scholar. There he gained a PhD in chemical engineering (1979). He joined the company ICI in 1977 and moved to the University of Manchester Institute of Science and Technology (UMIST) in 1982 where he was appointed to a Chair in chemical engineering.

== Pinch analysis ==
The key concepts of Pinch analysis were developed in his MSc. dissertation (1972, ETH Zurich) and in his PhD thesis "Thermodynamic Analysis in the Design of Process Networks" (awarded 1979, Leeds University). For this early work, Linnhoff received the Georg-Fischer-Preis of the ETH (1972) and the IChemE (UK) Moulton Medal and “Best Paper” Awards (both in 1980).

His work was developed in a series of papers beginning in 1978. Although he and his PhD supervisor John R. Flower had difficulty getting the first paper accepted, it became one of the most highly cited in the history of chemical engineering. In ICI, six design optimisation projects in six ICI Divisions (incl USA, Europe and Australia) resulted in significant energy savings. Subsequent programme of method development and further applications followed with ICI itself adopting the technique and further papers followed.

Linnhoff led the multi-author team which produced the IChemE User Guide on Process Integration for the Efficient Use of Energy, 1st edition, in 1982. This became the main textbook on pinch analysis, selling well for many years, and formed the backbone of the revised and expanded second edition of 2006, "Pinch Analysis and Process Integration", and third edition of 2019.

== World-wide recognition ==
In 1982 the work was recognised by the award of a Royal Society Gold Medal: the "Esso Energy Award" (UK) "for the contribution to the design of process plants and their energy utilization".

The early papers and awards led to sufficient academic status for his appointment to a Chair of Chemical Engineering at UMIST at age 33. Once at UMIST, he established the “Research Consortium” of Internationals (Shell, Exxon, BP, BASF, were founder members) to fund and direct research programmes. He introduced Integrated Process Design, or "Process Integration", as a discipline to Chemical Engineering. In 1983, his team formed the "Centre for Process Integration" at UMIST. By 1986, the UMIST "Process Integration Research Consortium" counted member companies from 14 countries from America, Europe and Asia. The "Consortium" promoted technical co-operation between the sponsor companies and the UMIST team. At the time (1980s), consortia of this type were unusual and Linnhoff won a national D.T.I. (Department of Trade and Industry) competition for the best collaborative project between university and industry (1986).

== Linnhoff March Ltd ==
Linnhoff established Linnhoff March Ltd. in 1983 and ran it in parallel with UMIST. Linnhoff March offered process design services to international clients such as Shell from the outset. In 1986, training and software product lines were added and overseas offices were set up in the US (1986) and in Japan (1990). Around 1990, several projects for government agencies were set up including MITI (Japan), UBA, LFU (Germany), DTI, DoE (UK), EPA, EPRI (United States) and the European Commission to advise on incoming environmental legislation.

In 1986 he became a member of the UK government thinktank on energy conservation and an expert witness at the House of Lords on energy savings potential in industry in 1988.

Linnhoff ran Linnhoff March and the UMIST Department of Process Integration in parallel until 1994. Around 80% of all the world's largest oil and petrochemical companies had by then become clients or sponsors. Linnhoff left UMIST in 1994 and built up Linnhoff March into a dominant worldwide supplier. He sold the company in 2002 to KBC Advanced Technologies (FTSE listed) and retired.

== Post-retirement ==
In May 2010, Linnhoff became Chairman of Harvester Capital Ltd. Harvester Capital Ltd. which nurtures small technology companies, helping them to roll out internationally. One such company is Inview Technology which is involved in the Digital television transition of Nigeria from analogue to digital.

== Prizes, awards and honours ==
- ETH Georg-Fischer-Preis (1972)
- Council of Europe Scholarship (British Council, 1974)
- IChemE (UK) Moulton Medal and “Best Paper” Awards (1979)
- Royal Society (UK) Gold Medal - Esso Energy Award (1982)
- DTI (UK) Award for the best collaboration University/Industry(1986)
- AIChE (American Institute of Chemical Engineers) (US) Lifetime Achievement Award (1990)
- The Walter Ahlström Prize (now known as the Millennium Technology Prize (Helsinki, Finland, 1994)) for the best Engineering Innovation helping the Environment.
