= Process integration =

Term in chemical engineering

Process integration is a term in chemical engineering which has two possible meanings.

1. A holistic approach to process design which emphasizes the unity of the process and considers the interactions between different unit operations from the outset, rather than optimising them separately. This can also be called integrated process design or process synthesis. El-Halwagi (1997 and 2006) and Smith (2005) describe the approach well. An important first step is often product design (Cussler and Moggridge 2003) which develops the specification for the product to fulfil its required purpose.
2. Pinch analysis, a technique for designing a process to minimise energy consumption and maximise heat recovery, also known as heat integration, energy integration or pinch technology. The technique calculates thermodynamically attainable energy targets for a given process and identifies how to achieve them. A key insight is the pinch temperature, which is the most constrained point in the process. The most detailed explanation of the techniques is by Linnhoff et al. (1982), Shenoy (1995), Kemp (2006) and Kemp and Lim (2020), and it also features strongly in Smith (2005). This definition reflects the fact that the first major success for process integration was the thermal pinch analysis addressing energy problems and pioneered by Linnhoff and co-workers. Later, other pinch analyses were developed for several applications such as mass-exchange networks (El-Halwagi and Manousiouthakis, 1989), water minimization (Wang and Smith, 1994), and material recycle (El-Halwagi et al., 2003). A very successful extension was "Hydrogen Pinch", which was applied to refinery hydrogen management (Nick Hallale et al., 2002 and 2003). This allowed refiners to minimise the capital and operating costs of hydrogen supply to meet ever stricter environmental regulations and also increase hydrotreater yields.

== Description ==
In the context of chemical engineering, process integration can be defined as a holistic approach to process design and optimization, which exploits the interactions between different units in order to employ resources effectively and minimize costs.

Process integration is not limited to the design of new plants, but it also covers retrofit design (e.g. new units to be installed in an old plant) and the operation of existing systems. Nick Hallale (2001) explains that with process integration, industries are making more money from their raw materials and capital assets while becoming cleaner and more sustainable.

The main advantage of process integration is to consider a system as a whole (i.e. integrated or holistic approach) in order to improve their design and/or operation. In contrast, an analytical approach would attempt to improve or optimize process units separately without necessarily taking advantage of potential interactions among them.

For instance, by using process integration techniques it might be possible to identify that a process can use the heat rejected by another unit and reduce the overall energy consumption, even if the units are not running at optimum conditions on their own. Such an opportunity would be missed with an analytical approach, as it would seek to optimize each unit, and thereafter it wouldn’t be possible to re-use the heat internally.

Typically, process integration techniques are employed at the beginning of a project (e.g. a new plant or the improvement of an existing one) to screen out promising options to optimize the design and/or operation of a process plant.

Also it is often employed, in conjunction with simulation and mathematical optimization tools to identify opportunities in order to better integrate a system (new or existing) and reduce capital and/or operating costs.

Most process integration techniques employ Pinch analysis or Pinch Tools to evaluate several processes as a whole system. Therefore, strictly speaking, both concepts are not the same, even if in certain contexts they are used interchangeably. The review by Nick Hallale (2001) explains that in the future, several trends are to be expected in the field. In the future, it seems probable that the boundary between targets and design will be blurred and that these will be based on more structural information regarding the process network. Second, it is likely that we will see a much wider range of applications of process integration. There is still much work to be carried out in the area of separation, not only in complex distillation systems, but also in mixed types of separation systems. This includes processes involving solids, such as flotation and crystallization. The use of process integration techniques for reactor design has seen rapid progress, but is still in its early stages. Third, a new generation of software tools is expected. The emergence of commercial software for process integration is fundamental to its wider application in process design.
