= Emotions (CKay album) =

EMOTIONS

Studio album by CKay
- Released: October 18, 2024
- Genre: Afrobeats; Afroswing; hip-hop; soul; Afropop
- Length: 35:31
- Label: Warner Music Africa
- Producer: CKay; Reward Beatz; The Cavemen; Bola BMH; Jay Synth; Tudor Monroe; Moonesawmy Devadasen; Ozedikus

CKay chronology
Sad Romance (2022)	EMOTIONS (2024)

Professional ratings
Review scores
Source	Rating
The Native	7.0/10
Album Talks	5.3/10

Emotions is the second studio album by Nigerian singer CKay. It was released by Warner Music Africa on 18 October 2024. The album features guest appearances from Olamide, Ty Dolla $ign, Nora Fatehi, and The Cavemen, and was executive produced by CKay.

== Track listings ==
Emotions track listing
No.	Title	Writer(s)	Producer(s)	Length
1.	"That Feeling"	Chukwuka; Olawale Adeola Isaac	Reward Beatz	2:52
2.	"EGWU EJI"	Bolatito Obisanya; Chisom Onyeke; Chukwuka		2:53
3.	"Ride or Die?"	Ayodele Oluwaloseyi; Bolatito Obisanya; Chukwuka; Henry Durham; Tudor Monroe		3:02
4.	"In My Bed"	Chukwuka Ekweani; Bolatito Obisanya; Osagie Oluwapelumi Guobadia		2:59
5.	"Fall in Luv"	Chukwuka Ekweani; Igbinoba Osaze		2:57
6.	"Dorime"	Chukwuka Ekweani; Tyrone Griffin Jr.		2:34
7.	"Wahala"	Bolatito Obisanya; Chukwuka Ekweani; Moonesawmy Devadasen; Olamide Adedeji		2:50
8.	"It's True"	Amrita Sen; Bolatito Obisanya; Chukwuka Ekweani; Naura Fathi		2:49
9.	"Addicted"	Benjamin Chukwudi James; Chukwuka Ekweani; Kingsley Chukwudi Okorie		3:52
10.	"Mysterious Love"	Chukwuka; Olawale Adeola Isaac		2:32
11.	"Vanity"	Chimaobi Chrismathner Owoh; Chukwuka Ekweani; Isioma Wiz Ofuasia; Olamide Adedeji; Olawale Isaac; Segun Adenola		3:28
12.	"The Final Boss"	Benneth Akpudo; Chukwuka Ekweani		2:38
Total length:				35:31

== Charts ==
Chart performance for EMOTIONS
Chart (2024)	Peak position
Nigerian Albums (TurnTable)	35
