= Zoma Museum =

Art project in Addis Ababa and Harla, Ethiopia

The Zoma Museum (Amharic: ዞማ ቤተ-መዘክር), formerly known as the Zoma Contemporary Art Center (ZCAC), is an environmentally conscious artist in residency project with locations in Addis Ababa and Harla, a historical village near Dire Dawa in Ethiopia. Due to its links and considerable work with European and American galleries, ZCAC has been influential in the contemporary Ethiopian visual art sector and as a conduit for Ethiopian artists to be featured internationally. It is currently headed by curator Meskerem Assegued.

== History ==
The concept was first introduced to the public in 2002 during Giziawi #1, its first art happening. Named after Zoma Shifferaw, a young Ethiopian artist who died of cancer in 1979, ZCAC is located in two major cities in Ethiopia. ZCAC Addis is in a house built by Elias Sime in Addis Ababa, and ZCAC Harla is in Harla, a small historic village east of Dire Dawa. ZCAC is run like a family where the surrounding community is an extension of the center.

== Location ==
=== ZCAC Addis Ababa ===
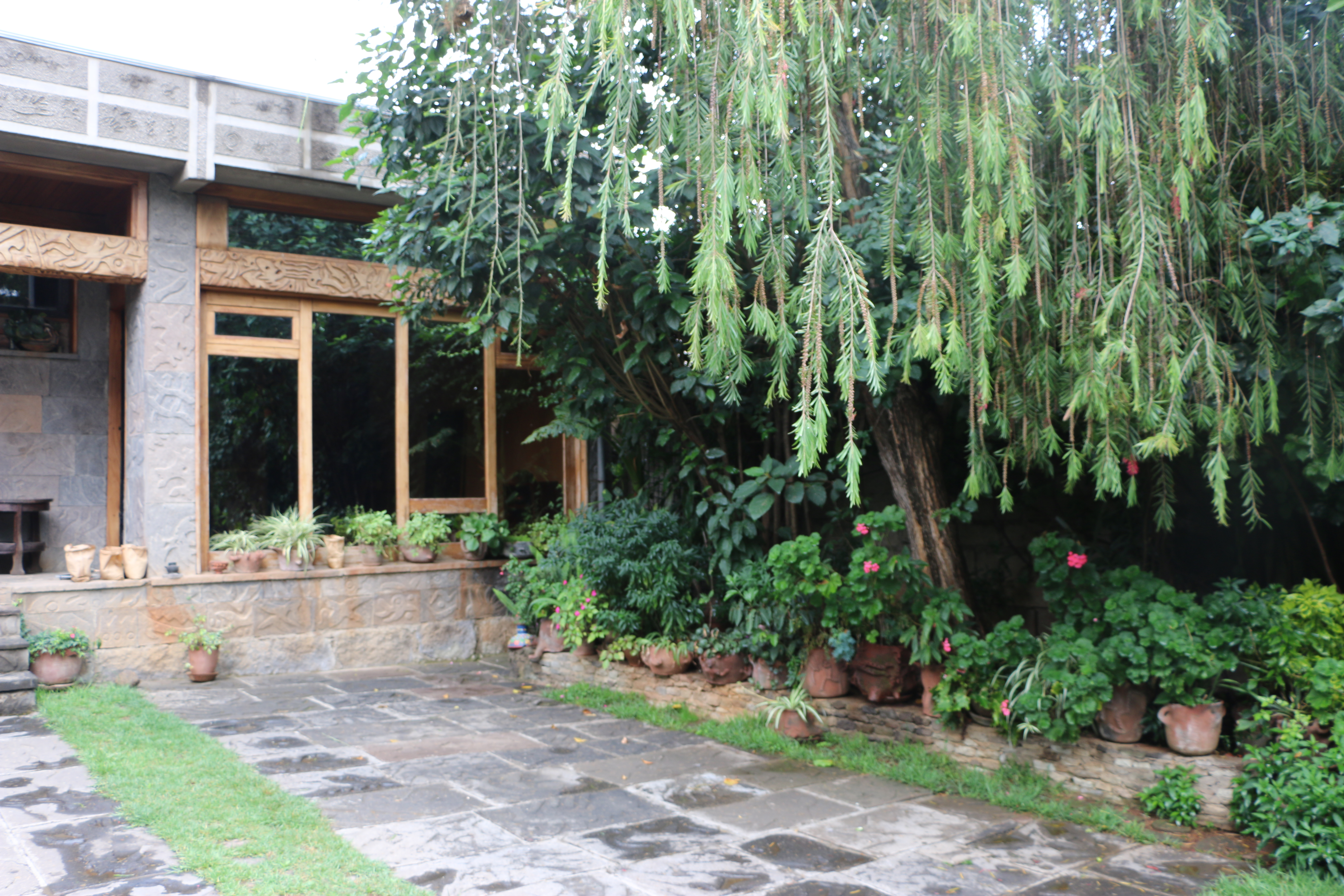
ZCAC Addis Ababa Compound

The construction of ZCAC begun in 2002 by Elias Sime and Meskerem Assegued, which took them about seven years to finish the unique building of mud and straw. Due to Elias' solo exhibition curated by Meskerem Assegued and Peter Sellars "Eye of the Needle, Eye of the Heart" (2009) at the Santa Monica Museum of Art, the house attracted the attention of the world media. The New York Times Magazine called it "a voluptuous dream, a swirl of ancient technique and ecstatic imagination". The house is the home of ZCAC Addis and features a showroom and a studio for visiting artists. In 2014, the New York Times selected ZCAC's photo for their article about 52 places to go in 2014.

=== ZCAC Harla DireDawa ===
Harla is a small village located in hills roughly 15 kilometers from Dire Dawa encompassing several archaeological sites. In 2007, ZCAC received a piece of land in Harla from the Dire Dawa city administration. Following ZCAC's goals, sustainable buildings are being constructed there.

== Zoma School ==
Zoma School is an edible schoolyard where students learn to create and sustain an organic garden in a landscape that is wholly integrated into the schools' curriculum, culture and food program. Inspired by Alice Waters Edible Schoolyard project, Zoma School aims to provide an education system where children are thought mathematics, science, language and art by integrated garden and kitchen classes.
