= Attainable region theory =

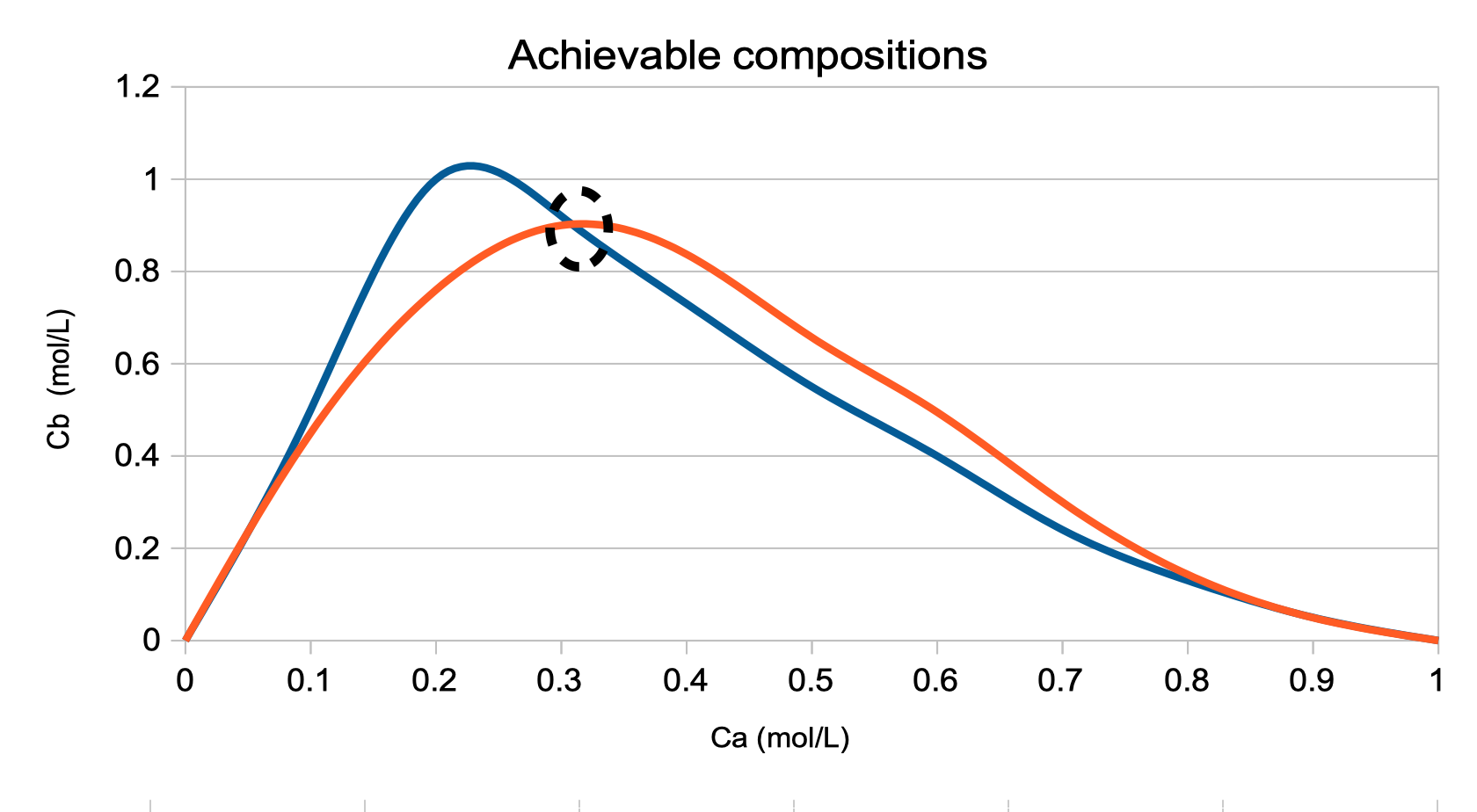
Simulated line graph of two sets of composition of two substances (Ca and Cb) obtained using attainable region theory. Desired optimal region circled.

Attainable region (AR) theory is a branch of chemical engineering, specifically chemical reaction engineering, that uses geometric and mathematical optimization concepts to assist in the design of networks of chemical reactors. AR theory is a method to help define the best reactor flowsheet using graphical techniques for a desired duty or objective function.

== Origin of AR theory ==
The initial concept of an attainable region for chemical processes was proposed by Fritz Horn in 1964, where he believed in geometric methods to improve process design. These ideas were later refined and made specific to chemical reactors by co-developers David Glasser, Diane Hildebrandt, and Martin Feinberg.

== Overview ==
The AR is defined as the collection all possible outcomes for all conceivable reactor combinations. Geometrically, the AR may (for instance) be represented as a convex region in state space representing all possible outlet compositions for all reactor combinations. A combination of reactors is often termed a reactor structure. An example of the reactors that are considered for this theory are Continuous flow stirred-tank reactor (CSTR) and a Plug flow reactor model (PFR).

Knowledge of the AR helps to address two areas in chemical reactor design:

1. The reactor network synthesis problem: Given a system of reactions and feed point, construction of the AR assists with determining an optimal reactor structure that achieves a desired duty or objective function. That is, AR theory assists with understanding specifically what type and combination of the chemical reactors are best suited for a particular system and duty.
2. Performance targeting: Given an existing reactor design, knowledge of the AR assists with understanding if there are other reactor structures that could achieve superior performance, by comparison to its location in the AR. Seeing as the AR represents all reactor designs by definition, different proposed reactor designs must lie as a point in or on the AR in state space. The effectiveness of each design may then all be assessed by comparison the AR and their relation to objective functions if any.

== Applications of theory ==
Examples of where AR theory can be applied, include:

- The design of batch reactor networks; and
- Comminution (Milling).

== See also ==
- Chemical reactors
- Chemical reaction engineering
