= CKay =

Nigerian singer and record producer (born 1995)

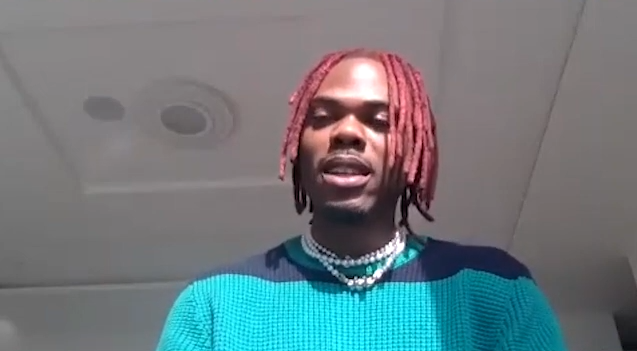
- CKay during an interview in March 2022
- Born: Chukwuka Chukwuma Ekweani; 16 July 1995 (age 31); Kaduna, Nigeria
- Education: Zamani College, Kaduna State Nigeria from js1 -ss3.
- Occupations: Singer; songwriter; record producer
- Years active: 2016–present
- Agent: Joseph Salubi
- Works: Discography
- Musical career
- Genres: Afrobeats; R&B; Pop; Alté
- Instruments: Vocals; piano; drums; guitar
- Labels: Boyfriend Music; AWAL
- Website: ckay-music.com

Chukwuka Chukwuma Ekweani (born 16 July 1995), better known by his stage name Ckay (stylized as CKay), is a Nigerian singer, songwriter and record producer, who is the co-founder and CEO of Boyfriend Music. He was formerly signed to Chocolate City, a member of Warner Music Group independent label services ADA before joining Warner Music Africa (formerly known as Warner Music South Africa) and Atlantic Records. His international hit single "Love Nwantiti", also known as "Love Nwantiti (Ah Ah Ahh)", was released in 2019 by Chocolate City.

On 29 March 2022, the song debuted at number one, following the launch of the Billboard Afrobeats chart. On 9 May 2022, it became the first-ever African song to surpass one billion streams on Spotify and has since been deemed "the biggest hit in African history". Asa Asika signed Ckay to The Plug, under management during the early peak of his global career as Ckay's manager.

== Early life ==
Chukwuka Ekweani was born in Kaduna, a state in the north-western region of Nigeria. He is of Igbo descent from Anambra State, located in the southeastern part of Nigeria. His love for music was driven by his father, who was a choir conductor at their local church. While growing up, he was moved by musical instruments, which prompted him to learn the piano from his father. Thereafter, a friend introduced him to the production software Fruity Loops. Chukwuka started off his music career as a member of a band, made up of him and two other bandmates, before beginning his solo career as CKay.

== Career ==
=== 2014–2017: Chocolate City and Who Is CKay? ===
In 2014, he relocated to Lagos after he got discovered. While signed to Loopy Music, he began working with Chocolate City, in early 2015. On 6 May 2016, he released a promotional single titled "Bad Musician Bad Producer", with its instrumental made available for free downloads across all Nigerian blogs for commercial use for covers, club, and airplay. Following the merger of Loopy Music in 2016, he officially joined Chocolate City artist roster in August 2016. On 23 October 2016, "Bad Musician Bad Producer" cover by Kelly Joe, was nominated by TNMA and earned CKay, a special recognition. On 11 September 2017, he released Who the F*ck Is CKay? - ep, through Chocolate City.

=== 2018–2021: "Love Nwantiti", Warner Music Africa and "Emiliana" ===
On 2 March 2018, he released "Container", an Afrobeat record influenced by the South African gwara gwara dance style. The song became a breakthrough record in Nigeria and earned him substantial airplay. It was released through Chocolate City, and was produced by Tempoe. On 6 July 2018, he released the music video, directed and shot by the Myth. On 30 August 2019, he released his second extended play CKay the First through Chocolate City. The "EP" spawned the hit track "Love Nwantiti", which became a major record in Nigeria. On 14 February 2020, CKay released a remix titled "Love Nwantiti (Ah Ah Ah)" featuring Joeboy and Kuami Eugene. In 2021, it went viral on TikTok and became an international hit, charting across Europe, Africa, Australia and New Zealand, also reaching number 23 in the UK and earned him his first entry on the US Billboard Hot 100. A North African remix featuring ElGrande Toto became popular in the Maghreb countries and in Germany. A French remix featured Franglish, a German remix featuring Frizzo, Joeboy, and Kuami Eugene, the Spanish version with De La Ghetto, the East African remix featuring Rayvanny, and a South African remix featuring Tshego and Gemini Major.

On 13 November 2020, he appeared on the song "La La" from Davido's studio album A Better Time, released through Davido Music Worldwide, RCA Records, and Sony Music. On 11 February 2021, he released his third ep Boyfriend through Warner Music South Africa. On 4 May 2021, CKay tweeted “I'm NOT signed to Chocolate City. I'm signed to Warner Music South Africa.” On 28 July 2021, he received a Silver Creator Award from YouTube, at 100k subscribers. On 6 August 2021, he appeared on the song "Beggie Beggie" from Ayra Starr's debut studio album 19 & Dangerous, released through Mavin Records. On 8 October 2021, Ckay became the first African artist to hit 20 Million Spotify Listeners, with over 21 million monthly listeners on his Spotify page. On 3 November 2021, he reviled his record deal with Atlantic on Power 99.1 FM. On 3 December 2021, CKay released "Emiliana", and "By Your Side" featuring Blxckie. On 1 April 2022, the music video was released and directed by Mosh. Emiliana charted across Europe, and Africa, also reaching number 9 in France and earning him, his first top 5 ranking on the Nigeria TurnTable Top 50 chart. On 26 May 2022, Emiliana was certified platinum in France.

=== 2022–present: "Watawi", and other ventures ===
On 24 May 2022, Starr's "Beggie Beggie" earned him, a special recognition at The Headies, in the Best Collaboration category. On 17 June 2022, he released "Watawi", featuring Davido, Focalistic, and Abidoza, which peaked at number 13 on Nigeria's TurnTable Top 50 and was accompanied by a music video, directed by Dalia Dias. On 20 June 2022, CKay became the second African artist to reach 1.2 billion streams and was surpassed by 200 million streams from Burna Boy, as the most-streamed with a total of 1.4 billion streams. In August 2022, CKay surpassed 100 Million Streams On Boomplay, and was given a golden club plaque from Boomplay. According to Boomplay statistics, CKay music was part of 3,549 playlists, with over 120 countries enjoying and streaming Ckay songs on Boomplay as of 18 August 2022.

On 27 August 2024, CKay and his childhood friend Joseph Salubi, launched Boyfriend Music, a music publishing and management company, with an American subsidiary, stylized as Boyfrnd Music, with the sole aim to extend its support to artists, songwriters, and producers globally. In October 2024, CKay released a 12-track sophomore album titled EMOTIONS featuring Olamide, The Cavemen (band), Ty Dolla $ign and Nora Fatehi. On 18 April 2025, CKay officially exits Warner Music Africa, following the end of his record deal. On 31 May 2025, he signed a new partnership deal with AWAL, to support the release of his upcoming project, CKay the Second. On 13 June 2025, he released his debut extended play CKay the Second under Boyfriend Music Limited (as CKay Holdings LLC), under exclusive license to AWAL Recordings.

== Artistry ==
If Alté means ‘different’, then I guess so. I see everybody that is considered Alté; Lady Donli, Odunsi, and the rest of them and they are being themselves. They sing what they want to, act like they want to, take pictures like they want to, dress like they want to, and I do the same. I am myself and do the things I want to, regardless of society and external pressures. I don’t give a fuck about what anybody thinks and I make Afrobeats. I don’t know if that’s Alté, but that’s me. That’s CKay.

— Culture Custodian

CKay has personally dubbed his sound "Emo-afrobeats", to note his focus on emotional and romantic lyricism in his music. CKay has made tracks in a variety genres including Afrobeats, R&B and dancehall. On 4 June 2019, in an interview with Ayo Onikoyi of Vanguard Nigeria, he described his style of music as Afro-pop from the future (2056 A.D specifically). On 24 September 2021, the OCC writer Helen Ainsley, describes CKay's music as fusing Afrobeats with pop, electronic music, and even interpolating classical music. On 29 October 2021, Nelson C.J. of Teen Vogue, listed CKay among other Nigerian artists confused to be Alté singers.

== Discography ==
Studio albums

- Sad Romance (2022)
- Emotions (2024)
- Banger Boy (2026)

EPs

- Who the Fuck Is CKay? (2017)
- CKay the First (2019)
- Boyfriend (2021)
- CKay the Second (2025)

== Accolades ==
Year	Awards ceremony	Award description(s)	Nominated work	Results
2017	Top Naija Music Awards	Best Song Cover	"Bad Musician Bad Producer" by Kelly Joe	Nominated
2018	City People Music Award	Best New Act of the Year	Himself	Nominated
2020	City People Music Award	Best Collabo of the Year	Love Nwantiti "(with. Joeboy, & Kuami Eugene)"	Nominated
2021	All Africa Music Awards	Most Promising African Artist	Himself "Felony"	Nominated
2021	Mobo Awards	Best African Music Act	Himself	Nominated
2021	Muzikol Music Awards	Biggest African Music Exporter	Himself	Nominated
2021	Muzikol Music Awards	Best African Song	"Love Nwantiti"	Won
2022	Brit Awards	Best International Song	"Love Nwantiti"	Nominated
2022	Brit Awards	Songwriters & Publishers of the Most-Performed Songs of the Year	Himself for "Love Nwantiti (ah ah ah) [Remix]"	Honour
2022	The Future Awards Africa	Prize for Music (Endowed by Infinix)	Himself	Nominated
2022	The Headies	Best Collaboration	"Beggie Beggie" (with. Ayra Starr)	Nominated
2022	The Headies	Digital Artiste of the Year	Himself	Nominated
2022	Global Music Awards Africa	Afrobeat Artist of the Year	Himself	Nominated
2022	Global Music Awards Africa	Afrobeat Song of the Year	"Love Nwantiti"	Nominated
2022	Global Music Awards Africa	Songwriter of the Year	CKay and ElGrande Toto	Nominated
2022	Global Music Awards Africa	Popular Song of the Year	"Love Nwantiti"	Nominated
2022	American Music Awards	Favorite Afrobeats Artist	Himself	Nominated
2022	Soul Train Music Awards	Best New Artist	Himself	Nominated
2022	NRJ Music Awards	Social Hit of the Year	Himself	Nominated
2023	iHeartRadio Music Awards	Afrobeats Artist	Himself	Nominated
2023	The Headies	Best R&B Single	"mmadu"	Nominated
2023	29th South African Music Awards	Rest Of Africa Artist	Himself for Sad Romance	Pending

== Tours ==
- Sad Romance Tour (2022)
