= CKay the First =

EP by CKay
- Released: 30 August 2019
- Studios: Chocolate City (Lagos, Nigeria)
- Genre: Afrobeats
- Length: 23:20
- Label: Chocolate City
- Producers: Tempoe; CKay; Real Btee

CKay chronology
Who the Fuck Is CKay? (2017)	CKay the First (2019)	Boyfriend (2021)

Singles from CKay the First
- 1. "Way" Released: 16 August 2019; 2. "Love Nwantiti" Released: 29 August 2019

CKay the First is the second extended play by Nigerian singer-songwriter CKay. It was released on 30 August 2019 by Chocolate City through Warner Music Group.

The EP was primarily produced by Tempoe, who produced five of its eight tracks, including “Love Nwantiti,” which he co-produced with CKay. This makes him the project's most prominent producer alongside CKay, who self-produced the remaining tracks. Additional production came from Real Btee, with Paul Okeugo and Aibee Abidoye serving as executive producers.

The EP features guest appearances from DJ Lambo, BOJ, Blaqbonez, and Barry Jhay.

== Background and release ==
The EP's lead single, "Way" featuring DJ Lambo, was released on 16 August 2019. It was produced by CKay himself. On 18 October 2019, CKay released the music video for "Way", shot and directed by Clarence Peters.

== Composition ==
The opening track "DTF" was described as "saucy and bouncy". "Love Nwantiti" is a love song with a lo-fi, resonant Afrobeats sound. CKay was called "drunk in love" on the song, on which he sings "Without you I go fit fall and die, without you I go give up my life". "Kalakuta" was said to share similar adlibs to "Dapada" by Dremo and Mayorkun. On the song, CKay also samples some Fela adlibs. "Way" featuring DJ Lambo is an uptempo track that interpolates Beethoven's 5th Symphony. The "prosaic" lyrics see CKay bragging about his "deluxe lifestyle". "Ski Ski" was compared to the opening of "Nobody Fine Pass You" by T-Classic. The lyrics from 34 seconds in were said to "sound like something off the Rema alley". "Oliver Kahn" featuring BOJ is another Afrobeats track, while "Like to Party" featuring Blaqbonez is a club song. "Beeni" featuring Barry Jhay was called "another standout record".

== Critical reception ==
Professional ratings
Review scores
Source	Rating
Pulse Nigeria	6.0/10

In a review for Pulse Nigeria, Motolani Alake wrote: "Again, CKay makes good songs, but most of them have very minimal 'hit' prospects. [...] Throughout CKay The First, the songs are good and mostly alluring. Even the ones without allure will likely find a niche audience. The problem is whether any of the songs sound like hits. The question is if any of those songs could get CKay from C5 to B3. After all, the Nigerian mainstream is witnessing a change of guard and CKay is far more talented than most of the guys crafting hits."

In review for Culture Custodian, Michael Kolawole said: "This EP shows that Ckay is still a work in progress. It's an album that twists and sways, trying to find form and make a mark. The songs are vibrant and bursting in style. But they are not engaging. The lyrics are too basic to impress. The songs are tawdry radio pop fodder that won't endure the bustling Nigerian music scene. Nonetheless, it’s an improved leap from his previous effort. Perhaps Ckay might hit the bull’s eye on his next offering (that's if he puts in enough work)."

== Track listing ==
CKay the First track listing
No.	Title	Writer(s)	Producer(s)	Length
1.	"DTF"	Chukwuka Ekweani; Abraham Obot	Real Btee	3:31
2.	"Love Nwantiti (Ah Ah Ah)"	Ekweani	Tempoe, CKay	2:26
3.	"Kalakuta"	Ekweani	Tempoe	2:40
4.	"Way" (featuring DJ Lambo)	Ekweani; Olawunmi Okerayi	CKay	2:32
5.	"Ski Ski"	Ekweani	Tempoe	3:07
6.	"Oliver Kahn" (featuring BOJ)	Ekweani	CKay	2:53
7.	"Like to Party" (featuring Blaqbonez)	Ekweani; Emeka Akumefule	Tempoe	2:52
8.	"Beeni" (featuring Barry Jhay)	Ekweani; Oluwakayode Jr. Balogun	Tempoe	3:19
Total length:				23:20

== Personnel ==
- Chukwuka Ekweani – primary artist, writer, production (track 2, 4, 6)
- Paul Okeugo and Aibee Abidoye – executive producer
- Real Btee – production (track 1)
- Tempoe – production (track 2, 3, 5, 7, 8)

== Charts ==
=== Weekly charts ===
Weekly chart performance for CKay the First
Chart (2021)	Peak position
Canadian Albums (Billboard)	20
Danish Albums (Hitlisten)	24
Dutch Albums (Album Top 100)	12
French Albums (SNEP)	35
US Billboard 200	117
US World Albums (Billboard)	3

=== Year-end charts ===
Year-end chart performance for CKay the First
Chart (2021)	Position
Dutch Albums (Album Top 100)	89

== Release history ==
Release history and formats for CKay the First
Region	Date	Format	Label
Various	30 August 2019	Digital download; streaming	Chocolate City; WMG
