= Warner Music Africa =

Music company

- 2022 logo
- Industry: Music; entertainment
- Predecessors: Warner Music Gallo Africa; Warner Music South Africa
- Founded: 5 December 2013; 12 years ago
- Headquarters: 1 Saxon Rd, Hyde Park, Sandton, 2196, Johannesburg, South Africa
- Area served: Africa
- Key people: Temi Adeniji (MD.)
- Services: Music publishing, Music distribution, Music recording, Brand strategy
- Parent: Warner Music Group
- Subsidiaries: WM Africa Francophone; Africori; Coleske Artist Management
- Website: warnermusic.co.za

Former logo as WM South Africa

Warner Music Africa (WMA) (formerly Warner Music South Africa) is a music corporation of the global record label Warner Music Group, founded on 5 December 2013. with its South Africa arm managing artist development, marketing, and distribution for Warner Music artists in Africa, with its corporate headquarters located in 1 Saxon Rd, Hyde Park, Sandton, 2196, Johannesburg, South Africa.

== Overview ==
Warner Music South Africa was founded on 5 December 2013, following the buyout of Gallo Records share of the joint venture Warner Music Gallo Africa as a division of Warner Music Group. Following the launching of the imprint, WMG appoints the former Warner Music Gallo Africa general manager Tracy Fraser, as the managing director of Warner Music South Africa. Tracy participated in the signing of Josh Kempen, Locnville, Mango Groove, Janie Bay, Dr Bone, Zahara, Julanie J, Masandi, Faith K, CKay, and Diamond Platnumz, with a 360 partnership deal between WMG, and WCB Wasafi. Tracy stepped down from her position in 2021.

On 22 March 2021, Temi Adeniji was appointed by WMG with the combined role of managing director of Warner Music South Africa and SVP, Strategy, of Sub-Saharan Africa. Temi participated in the signing of Kiddo CSA, Sizwe Alakine, and Rouge. On 16 September 2021, Temi participated in the buying of Coleske, one of South Africa largest independent label. According to Unorthodox Reviews, prior to May 2022, Warner Music South Africa began operating as Warner Music Africa. The news was broken by Temi Adeniji, at an exclusive launch held on 11 May 2022 at Warner Music offices in Hyde Park. On 23 June 2022, Warner Music Africa launched a brand strategy division.

The brand strategy division of Warner Music Africa was led by the entertainment lawyer Thembi Mpungose-Niklas, who was appointed. Thembi is to report directly to WMA managing director and senior vice-president of special projects in sub-Saharan Africa Temi Adeniji. On 5 July 2022, Warner Music Group, Blavatnik Family Foundation, and Social Justice Fund announce the launch of the SJF Repertoire Fund, an eight-year $10M initiative that allows WMG employees in participating regions to get involved, making Warner Music Africa, one of its team to receive $1M to be disbursed in Sub-Saharan Africa, by nominating local organizations for grants from $5,000-$15,000 USD.

In the inaugural cycle of SJF Repertoire Fund in Sub-Saharan Africa, we were very deliberate in finding organizations not only reflective of the focus pillars but also across various countries to reflect the diversity of the continent.

— Temi Adeniji

Warner Music Africa announced its first set of SJF Repertoire Fund grantee partners for Sub-Saharan Africa, would include organizations across Ethiopia, Ghana, Kenya, Nigeria, and South Africa. On the same day, Warner Music Africa approved grants to the following African organizations, including African Leadership Academy (South Africa), African Digital Media Institute (Kenya), AgroEknor Farmers Education & Empowerment Program (Nigeria), ArtNg (Nigeria), Edugrant (Nigeria), Fair Justice Initiative (Ghana), Kids Haven (South Africa), Rele Arts Foundation (Nigeria), The Sarz Academy Academy Foundation (Nigeria), The Tag Foundation (South Africa), The Tomorrow Trust (South Africa), Zoma Museum (Ethiopia), and WeThinkCode_ (South Africa).

On 20 May 2024, WMA established a creative hub in Lagos, Nigeria. The establishment seeks to help expand Warner Music workforce by providing more of its A&R, Operations, and Marketing expertise to Nigeria’s creative ecosystem. With the goal to amplify the voices of African artists and creators on the global stage, while fostering innovation and inclusivity within the region’s dynamic creative landscape.

=== Warner Music Gallo Africa ===
In 2006, Johnnic Communications (Gallo's parent company, which changed its name to Avusa in November 2007) entered a joint venture with the South African division of Warner Music Group and established Warner Music Gallo Africa. The Gallo Record Company's entire music archive digitally available for the first time. These include rare pressings as well as classic hits by artists such as Ladysmith Black Mambazo, Mahlathini and the Mahotella Queens, Miriam Makeba, Hugh Masekela, Letta Mbulu, Spokes Mashiyane, Lucky Dube, Yvonne Chaka Chaka and others. The joint venture ended in December 2013.

=== Warner Music Africa Francophone ===
On 25 October 2024, Warner Music Group announced the launch of WM Africa Francophone (WMAFR), which will operate in France and French-speaking Sub-Saharan Africa. The venture is a collaboration between Warner Music Africa, Africori, and Warner Music France, and to be led by Co-directors Marc-André Niang and Yoann Chapalain. The partnership connects the three entities’ A&R, Digital, and Marketing teams so that they can discover and develop artists, and create ground-breaking cross-cultural collaborations. The development also enables Warner Music to expand its operations in Francophone Africa, serving local artist communities there and connecting them to its global network.

== Partnerships ==
=== Flume ===
On 22 August 2019, WM South Africa announce a partnership deal with Flume, a digital marketing agency.

=== WCB Wasafi ===
On 18 May 2022, Warner Music Group announced a new 360 partnership deal with Diamond Platnumz and his leading independent record label WCB Wasafi. The new deal will see WCB Wasafi incorporated into Warner Music South Africa and Ziiki Media.

=== Lacuna Creative Studios ===
On 15 July 2023, Warner Music Africa announces a partnership with Lacuna Creative Studios, to oversee the post-production of Inkabi Zezwe six-part documentary series of the making of Sjava and Big Zulu’s Ukhamba studio album.

== Managing directors ==
- Tracy Fraser (2013-2021)
- Temi Adeniji (2021-present)

== Artists ==
- Josh Kempen
- Locnville
- Janie Bay
- Mango Groove
- Dr Bone
- Zahara
- Julanie J
- Masandi
- Faith K
- CKay
- Diamond Platnumz
- Kiddo CSA
- Rouge
- Sizwe Alakine
- Superstar Ace
- Ash
- Mvzzle
- pH Raw X
- BigStar Johnson
- Zandie Khumalo
- CampMasters
- Inkabi Zezwe
- Joeboy

== Selected discography ==
Singles, Albums and Eps, released through Warner Music Africa:

=== Singles ===
`List of singles released by artists signed to Warner Music Africa
Artist	Title	Year	Album	Release date
CKay	"Felony"	2020	Boyfriend	12 February 2021
CKay	"Skoin Skoin"	2021	Boyfriend	12 February 2021
CKay & Payal Dev	"Kiss Me Like You Miss Me"	2021	Non-album single	
CKay	"Emiliana"	2021	Sad Romance	23 September 2022
CKay	"By Your Side"	2021	Sad Romance	23 September 2022
CKay	"Maria"	2022	Non-album single	
CKay	"Watawi"	2022	Sad Romance	23 September 2022
CKay	"You"	2022	Sad Romance	23 September 2022
CKay	"Mmadu"	2022	Sad Romance	23 September 2022
CKay	"HALLELUJAH"	2023	Sad Romance (Deluxe)	16 June 2023
CKay	"nwayi"	2023	Sad Romance (Deluxe)	16 June 2023
Inkabi Zezwe	"Umbayimbayi"	2023	Ukhamba	24 March 2023
CKay	"IS IT YOU?"	2024	TBA	26 January 2024
CKay	"MYSTERIOUS LOVE"	2024	TBA	26 January 2024
Joeboy	"Osadebe"	2024	Viva Lavida	16 February 2024
