= Love Nwantiti =

2019 single by CKay

"Love Nwantiti (Ah Ah Ah)"
- Remix cover

Single by CKay featuring Joeboy and Kuami Eugene

from the EP CKay the First
- Language: Nigerian Pidgin, Igbo, French
- Released: 29 August 2019 (original); 14 February 2020 (remix featuring Joeboy and Kuami Eugene)
- Genre: Afrobeats
- Length: 2:25 (original); 3:08 (remix featuring Joeboy & Kuami Eugene)
- Label: Chocolate City, Warner Music/Atlantic Records
- Songwriter: Chukwuka Ekweani
- Producers: CKay, Tempoe

CKay singles chronology
"Way" (2019)	"Love Nwantiti (Ah Ah Ah)" (2020)	"Felony" (2020)

Joeboy singles chronology
"Don't Call Me Back" (2020)	"Love Nwantiti (Ah Ah Ah)" (2020)	"Blessings" (2020)

Kuami Eugene singles chronology
"Turn Up" (2020)	"Love Nwantiti (Ah Ah Ah)" (2020)

Music video
- "Love Nwantiti (Ah Ah Ah)" on YouTube

North African Remix video
- "Love Nwantiti (North African Remix)" on YouTube

Acoustic version video
- "Love Nwantiti (Acoustic Version)" on YouTube

"Love Nwantiti" is a song by Nigerian singer and songwriter CKay, released in 2019 as the second track from his second extended play Ckay the First by Chocolate City through Warner Music Group. A remix of the song titled "Love Nwantiti (Ah Ah Ah)" featuring Nigerian singer Joeboy and Ghanaian singer Kuami Eugene, released as a single in February 2020, became a commercial success in Nigeria, Middle East, North Africa and in many European club venues, as well as the subject of collaborations with few local artists for localised variations. The French version included vocals by French rapper Franglish.

In 2021, the song charted across Europe, Australia, Latin America, and New Zealand, reaching number one in India, the Netherlands, Norway and Switzerland, and gained popularity across TikTok. It also peaked at number 3 on the UK Singles Chart and reached number one on the UK Indie Singles Chart. It also reached No. 26 on the US Billboard Hot 100, it peaked at No. 2 on the Billboard Global 200 and appeared on the Canadian Hot 100. On 4 October 2021, it peaked at number 30 on the Nigeria TurnTable Top 50 chart and reached number 14 on 20 October 2021.

Although in most countries the main remix by CKay featuring Joeboy and Kuami Eugene was released, another version, the North African remix with ElGrandeToto became a hit in Germany, Italy, Austria and Denmark. A version by De La Ghetto made a brief appearance in France, although the main CKay/Joeboy/Kuami Eugene version topped the French Singles Chart.

== Music videos ==
A music video for "Love Nwantiti (Ah Ah Ah)" was released on 14 February 2020, it was directed by Naya visuals and it became the first Afrobeats music video to surpass 300 million views on YouTube. A video for the North African remix featuring ElGrande Toto was released on 4 November 2021. It was shot in Lagos and was directed by TG Omori, it surpassed 34 million views after a month of release on YouTube.

A performance video for the acoustic version was also released in 2020 and has since garnered 220 million views on YouTube.

== Impact ==
CKay's Spotify monthly listeners increased to over 34 million following the rising popularity of the song, it also has been subject to five remixes. Various covers performed around the world with different instruments and sung in a variety of languages most notably Hindi, French and Spanish have also been uploaded on social media platform attracting their own popularity, the song trended across TikTok and in the middle east and Asia, it also soundtracked over three million TikTok videos and was subject to many local variants.

The song is a sleeper hit. It first appeared on his 2019 extended play; however, it took two years from that appearance for the song to actually gain mass popularity from TikTok and other platforms.

=== Dance routine ===
A dance routine for the song was created by TikToker Tracy Joseph, which has been used in several videos by people participating in the #Lovenwantitichallenge.

As of December 2021, "Love Nwantiti" is the most certified Afrobeats song. It also became the second song by a Nigerian artist to debut on the Billboard Hot 100 and the Billboard Global 200 after "Essence”.

== Versions ==
- 2019: "Love Nwantiti"
- 2020: "Love Nwantiti" (Acoustic Version)
  - 2020: "Love Nwantiti" (Remix) (featuring Joeboy and Kuami Eugene)

Collaborations

1. "Love Nwantiti (Ah Ah Ah)" (Remix) (Digital Chocolate City / Warner) – 3:08
2. "Love Nwantiti (Ah Ah Ah)" (North African Remix) – CKay featuring ElGrandeToto – 2:15
3. "Love Nwantiti (Ah Ah Ah)" (French Remix) – CKay featuring Franglish – 2:15

== Accolades ==
Year	Awards ceremony	Award description(s)	Results
2020	City People Music Award	Best Collabo of the Year	Nominated
2022	Brit Awards	Best International Song	Nominated
2022	BMI Awards London	Most Performed International Song	Won

== Charts ==
=== Weekly charts ===
Chart performance for "Love Nwantiti (Ah Ah Ah)"
Chart (2020–2024)	Peak position
Argentina (Argentina Hot 100)	58
Australia (ARIA)	8
Austria (Ö3 Austria Top 40)	4
Belgium (Ultratop 50 Flanders)	8
Belgium (Ultratop 50 Wallonia)	10
Brazil (Top 100 Brasil)	97
Canada (Canadian Hot 100)	5
Colombia (Promúsica)	19
Costa Rica (FONOTICA)	8
Czech Republic Singles Digital (ČNS IFPI)	9
Denmark (Tracklisten)	6
France (SNEP)	1
Germany (GfK)	6
Global 200 (Billboard)	2
Greece International (IFPI)	4
Hungary (Dance Top 40)	19
Hungary (Rádiós Top 40)	33
Hungary (Single Top 40)	6
Hungary (Stream Top 40)	7
Iceland (Tónlistinn)	11
India International Singles (IMI)	1
Ireland (IRMA)	5
Italy (FIMI)	20
Lebanon (OLT20)	12
Lithuania (AGATA)	12
Luxembourg (Billboard)	5
Malaysia (RIM)	8
Netherlands (Dutch Top 40)	14
Netherlands (Single Top 100)	1
New Zealand (Recorded Music NZ)	2
Nigeria (TurnTable)	14
Norway (VG-lista)	1
Peru (UNIMPRO)	13
Portugal (AFP)	1
Romania (Radiomonitor)	8
Romania (Romania TV Airplay)	3
Singapore (RIAS)	5
Slovakia Airplay (ČNS IFPI)	44
Slovakia Singles Digital (ČNS IFPI)	6
South Africa (RISA)	2
Spain (PROMUSICAE)	46
Sweden (Sverigetopplistan)	4
Switzerland (Schweizer Hitparade)	1
UK Singles (OCC)	3
UK Indie (OCC)	1
US Billboard Hot 100	26
US Afrobeats Songs (Billboard)	1
US Pop Airplay (Billboard)	20
US Rhythmic (Billboard)	1
US Rolling Stone Top 100	9

Chart performance for "Love Nwantiti" by De La Ghetto
Chart (2021)	Peak position
France (SNEP)	183

=== Year-end charts ===
2021 year-end chart performance for "Love Nwantiti (Ah Ah Ah)"
Chart (2021)	Position
Austria (Ö3 Austria Top 40)	43
Belgium (Ultratop Flanders)	86
Belgium (Ultratop Wallonia)	71
Canada (Canadian Hot 100)	88
Denmark (Tracklisten)	64
France (SNEP)	11
Germany (Official German Charts)	59
Global 200 (Billboard)	102
Hungary (Single Top 40)	53
Hungary (Stream Top 40)	48
India International Singles (IMI)	4
Netherlands (Single Top 100)	10
Norway (VG-lista)	38
Portugal (AFP)	11
Sweden (Sverigetopplistan)	65
Switzerland (Schweizer Hitparade)	21
UK Singles (OCC)	58

2022 year-end chart performance for "Love Nwantiti (Ah Ah Ah)"
Chart (2022)	Position
Belgium (Ultratop 50 Flanders)	169
Belgium (Ultratop 50 Wallonia)	101
Canada (Canadian Hot 100)	35
Germany (Official German Charts)	89
Global 200 (Billboard)	17
Hungary (Dance Top 40)	74
Netherlands (Single Top 100)	29
Sweden (Sverigetopplistan)	98
Switzerland (Schweizer Hitparade)	17
UK Singles (OCC)	78
US Billboard Hot 100	55
US Afrobeats Songs (Billboard)	3
US Rhythmic (Billboard)	8

2023 year-end chart performance for "Love Nwantiti (Ah Ah Ah)"
Chart (2023)	Position
Hungary (Dance Top 40)	87

2024 year-end chart performance for "Love Nwantiti (Ah Ah Ah)"
Chart (2024)	Position
Hungary (Dance Top 40)	81

2025 year-end chart performance for "Love Nwantiti (Ah Ah Ah)"
Chart (2025)	Position
Hungary (Dance Top 40)	96

== Certifications ==
Certifications for "Love Nwantiti"
Region	Certification	Certified units/sales
Denmark (IFPI Danmark)	Platinum	90,000^{‡}
Netherlands (NVPI)	2× Platinum	160,000^{‡}
Spain (Promusicae) DJ Yo & Axel Remix	Platinum	60,000^{‡}
^{‡} Sales+streaming figures based on certification alone.

Certifications for "Love Nwantiti (Ah Ah Ah)"
Region	Certification	Certified units/sales
Australia (ARIA)	Gold	35,000^{‡}
Austria (IFPI Austria)	Platinum	30,000^{‡}
Canada (Music Canada)	4× Platinum	320,000^{‡}
France (SNEP)	Diamond	333,333^{‡}
Germany (BVMI)	Platinum	400,000^{‡}
India (IMI)	20× Platinum	2,400,000
Italy (FIMI)	Platinum	70,000^{‡}
New Zealand (RMNZ)	3× Platinum	90,000^{‡}
Poland (ZPAV)	4× Platinum	200,000^{‡}
Portugal (AFP)	6× Platinum	60,000^{‡}
Spain (Promusicae)	Platinum	60,000^{‡}
United Kingdom (BPI)	2× Platinum	1,200,000^{‡}
United States (RIAA)	8× Platinum	8,000,000^{‡}
^{‡} Sales+streaming figures based on certification alone.

== Release history ==
Release history for "Love Nwantiti (Ah Ah Ah)"
Region	Date	Format(s)	Label	Ref.
Italy	1 October 2021	Contemporary hit radio	Chocolate City; Warner	
United States	26 October 2021	Contemporary hit radio	Chocolate City; Atlantic	
