= 2016 in African music =

== Events ==
- June - D'banj secretly marries Lineo Didi Kilgrow.
- September - Tsar Leo, "Malawi's Drake", is nominated in the 15th for his single, "The Other Side".
- October - A Man of Good Hope, a musical by Isango Ensemble based on a book by Jonny Steinberg, is performed at the Young Vic in London, UK.
- November - King Sunny Adé receives the AFRIMA award.
- December - King Sunny Adé is inducted into Hard Rock Cafe hall of fame.

== Albums ==
- January 23 - Ahmed Soultan - Music Has No Boundaries
- February 19 - Myrath - Legacy
- February 23 - Tiwa Savage - R.E.D (Deluxe Edition)
- February 29 - M.I - Illegal Music 3
- February 29 - Yung6ix - Billionaire Ambitions
- March 17 - Lil Kesh - Y.A.G.I
- March 21 - J. Martins - Authentic
- March 25 - Yemi Alade - Mama Africa
- April 5 - Jaywon - Oba Orin
- April 7 - Ike Moriz - Debonaire
- April 22 - Efya - Janesis
- May 9 - Brymo - Klĭtôrĭs
- May 14 - Kiss Daniel - New Era
- July 5 - Lindsey Abudei - ...and the Bass Is Queen
- July 28 - Adekunle Gold - Gold
- August 1 - Patoranking - God Over Everything
- August 29 - Reminisce - El-Hadj
- September 23 - Burna Boy - Redemption (EP)
- September 28 - Ladysmith Black Mambazo - Walking in the Footsteps of Our Fathers
- September 30 - Maleek Berry - Last Daze of Summer (EP)
- October 10 - DJ Spinall - Ten
- October 21 - Davido - Son of Mercy (EP)
- October 27 - Falz and Simi - Chemistry
- October 28 - Louise Carver - Hanging in the Void
- October 31 - Illbliss - Illygaty;7057
- November 1 - Phyno - The Playmaker
- November 11 - Sound Sultan - Out of the Box
- November 18 - Bez - Gbagyi Child
- December 26 - Olamide - The Glory

== Classical ==
Alfred P. Addaquay - Laudatur Christus

== Deaths ==
- April 24 – Papa Wemba, Congolese singer and musician, 66
- June 22 – Harry Rabinowitz, South African-born British conductor and composer, 100
- September 8 – Johan Botha, South African tenor, 51
- October 10 – Issa Bagayogo, Malian musician, 54
- November 9 – Nico Carstens, South African accordionist and songwriter, 90

== See also ==
- 2016 in music
