= Theta (album) =

Studio album by Brymo
- Released: May 27, 2022
- Genres: Folk; quiet storm; sentimental ballad
- Length: 35:00
- Language: Nigerian Pidgin
- Label: Independent
- Producer: Bigfoot

Brymo chronology
9: Harmattan & Winter (2021)	Theta (2022)	Ethos (2022)

Theta is the tenth studio album by Nigerian singer Brymo, independently released on May 27, 2022. The album comprises ten tracks and was recorded entirely in Nigerian Pidgin. Labeled a folk, sentimental ballad, and quiet storm record, Theta explores themes of survival, prudence, sexual violence, abuse, hypocrisy, communal violence, and love. The album's production was handled by Bigfoot, who single-handedly produced Brymo's Libel and 9: Harmattan & Winter projects in their entirety.

Brymo announced the album's track list in a Twitter post and characterized the record as an examination of human hardships and a glimpse of what could have been. Music critics lauded Theta for being simplistic.

== Background ==
Theta is Brymo's third full-length project in barely a year. In 2021, he released 9: Èsan and 9: Harmattan & Winter as his eighth and ninth albums, respectively. Theta has ten tracks and was recorded entirely in Nigerian Pidgin. Brymo announced the album's track list in a Twitter post and described the record as "a study of humanity's struggles – and a view into what it might have been". Producer Bigfoot, who previously oversaw the production of Brymo's Harmattan & Winter and Libel projects, single-handedly produced all of the album's tracks.

== Music and lyrics ==
Theta is a mixture of sentimental ballad, quiet storm, and folk music. It deals with themes of survival, prudence, sexual violence, abuse, hypocrisy, communal violence, and love. Every song on the album features rhythmic percussion and a piano chord. Although Theta has tracks with percussion and upbeat tempos, its chord progression is mostly dark and melancholic.

=== Tracks 1–5 ===
"Illusions", the album's opening track, has a somber and contemplative tone. On the record, Brymo analyzes the transatlantic slave trade and sarcastically highlights the behavior of African slaves towards their enslavers. Afrocritik writer Chinonso Ihekire wrote that while Brymo's position might be deemed inaccurate, the singer addresses the topic and conjure up graphic imageries that are reminiscent of Quentin Tarantino's Django Unchained. The mellow track "Pim Pim" is driven by "piano chords, shekere, and slow drums". In "Pim Pim", Brymo explores various people-centered worldviews. Ihekire said Brymo is not guilt-ridden about his lowly upbringing and that the record is evocative of the singer's individual challenges.

In "Dem No Born Us Together", an Afrobeats track, Brymo is critical of the bandwagon effect and advises listeners to consider their decisions. In "Love Na Drug", Brymo describes an agape love and talks about people who resent him. Pulse Nigeria's Motolani Alake praised Brymo for being an unapologetic human being and said the song depicts him as someone who expresses his genuine feelings. "Money Good", the album's fifth track, was described by Ihekire as a "slow-burn ode".

=== Tracks 6–10 ===
The slow-tempo track "Life Dey Go On" is composed of jazz-esque keys and violins. The seventh track, "Tomorrow", explores the theme of prudence. In the metal track "Oga", Brymo reflects on his 2020 rape allegations, which were discussed on Libel and made public on Twitter. The song describes a male character who has sexually molested a lady and is about to experience defeat. Alake considers "Oga" to be an anomaly and said it leans more towards suffering, repercussions, and punishment.

"Market Square", the ninth track, is a folksy song that ridicules people's ability to understand karma-related jokes. Alake said the song exemplifies Brymo's straightforward songwriting style. The album's closing track, "For You", delves into the idea of "love adulation".

== Critical reception ==
Professional ratings
Review scores
Source	Rating
Pulse Nigeria	8.2/10
Afrocritik	8.0/10
The Cable Lifestyle	7.0/10

Pulse Nigeria's Motolani Alake awarded the album 8.2 out of 10, calling it simplistic and noting that it "feels like an anthological series about society, humanity and our plight, delivered via a collection of mostly personal perspectives, feelings and musings." In a review for The Cable Lifestyle, Fareedat Taofeeq rated the album 7/10, calling it "a great piece" and praising the singer for embracing the literal meaning of each song.

Afrocritik's Chinonso Ihekire granted the album a rating of 8.0 out of 10, saying it "provides a reassuring feel of genius" and that its only noticeable imperfection is "its status as the work of a human mind eternally condemned to imperfection." Ihekire also characterized the album as "a complex masterpiece" and said it thrives on "simplicity".

== Track listing ==
All tracks are written by Ọlawale Ọlọfọrọ and produced by Bigfoot.

No.	Title	Length
1.	"Illusions"	5:39
2.	"Pim Pim"	3:33
3.	"Dem No Born Us Together"	3:19
4.	"Love Na Drug"	3:57
5.	"Money Good"	2:32
6.	"Life Dey Go On"	4:37
7.	"Tomorrow"	2:33
8.	"Oga"	2:53
9.	"Market Square"	2:42
10.	"For You"	3:16
Total length:		35:00

== Personnel ==
Credits adapted from Spotify.

- Ọlawale Ọlọfọrọ – performer, writer
- Bigfoot – production (all tracks)

== Release history ==
Release formats for Theta
Region	Date	Format	Label	Ref.
Various	May 27, 2022	Digital download, streaming	Independent	
