= 9: Harmattan & Winter =

Studio album by Brymo
- Released: September 9, 2021
- Genres: Afro-soul; alt-rock; folk music; sentimental ballad
- Length: 27:00
- Label: Independent
- Producer: Bigfoot

Brymo chronology
| 9: Èsan (2021) | 9: Harmattan & Winter (2021) | Theta (2022) |

Singles from 9: Harmattan & Winter
- 1. "Harmattan & Winter" Released: September 9, 2021

9: Harmattan & Winter, also known simply as Harmattan & Winter, is the ninth studio album by Nigerian singer Brymo. It was released on September 9, 2021, along with 9: Èsan. The album comprises nine tracks and is a combination of afro-soul, alternative rock, folk, sentimental ballad, and fusion-rock. Recorded entirely in English, Harmattan & Winter addresses topics of heartbreak, self-discovery, romance, mental health, and monogamy. Bigfoot produced the entire album, which deviates from Libel's "subtle denial" and Yellow's "hedonistic perspective". The title track, "Harmattan & Winter", was released as the album's only single. Harmattan & Winter received positive reviews from music critics, who called it a "morose album" and praised Brymo's songwriting.

== Background and promotion ==
Harmattan & Winter was released concurrently with Brymo's eighth studio album Èsan. It comprises nine tracks and is a mixture of afro-soul, alternative rock, folk, sentimental ballad, and fusion-rock. The album was recorded entirely in English and explores themes of monogamy, mental health, romance, despair, self-discovery, and heartbreak. Brymo dedicated Harmattan & Winter to his significant other and described it as an "ode to every 1, to every SIGMA, woman and man, to order!" He also said it pays homage to karma and to the seasons. On the record, Brymo's emotions are depicted in two separate ways: one side seems to wish for a calm connection, while the other side is filled with skepticism.

Producer Bigfoot, who oversaw Brymo's extended play Libel (2020), produced every song on Harmattan & Winter. The album's title "symbolizes a transition from insufficiency to abundance". Harmattan & Winter departs from Yellow's hedonistic viewpoint and Libel's "subtle denial". Moreover, it produces a serene, calming musical experience in contrast to Libel's optimism and Yellow's electronic pop. The album's lead single, "Harmattan & Winter", was released on September 9, 2021. The Promise Charles-directed music video for the song was released on the same day of the album's release. Kolawole praised the video's "visual tics and interpretive dancing", and said it "provides a clearer picture of the song's story".

== Music and lyrics ==
The album opens with "F**king Awesome", a reflective track with "breathy vocals and heavy keyboards". On the record, Brymo wants his spouse to be tolerant with him during his quest for a budding romance. "Harmattan & Winter", the title track, traces Brymo's journey to self-discovery and documents his maturation. Music critic Michael Kolawole said the song's instrumentation and Brymo's emotive lyrics "provide a feeling that's hard to neglect". In the gloomy track "The Dark", Brymo displays self-awareness, admits his weakness, and accepts full responsibility for his past wrongdoings.

"I Don't Have a Heart" is similar to Èsan's "Ọkán mi ti fọ́ Wẹ́wé". On the record, Brymo discusses his struggles to maintain his marriage and the depression he endured while temporarily being separated from his spouse. Daraloye characterized the song as "a middle finger to monogamy". In "Beast", a mid-tempo track, Brymo depicts a character who expresses regret to his partner for being emotionally unavailable and absent. The soulful ballad "Winifred" is dedicated to his mother-in-law, whose generosity and tenacity are exemplified by lyrics like "Give it all for Winifred, she knows, her heart is made of gold". Daraloye called the song a "celebration of love" and said it "functions as the spiritual centre-piece" of the album.

"Emotions and Limbs" examines Brymo's marital separation and extramarital affair. The song's opening verse briefly explained the shattered feelings that caused the temporary split; in the second verse, Brymo talks about how having sex with other women made him feel empty. The album's eighth track, "We All Lose Sometimes", was described by Daraloye as being "reflective and hopeful, with a few kind words spared for sufferers of depression and anxiety". The closing track, "There's a Place", features an epilogue that touches on themes of "freedom, hope, and victory".

== Critical reception ==
Professional ratings
Review scores
| Source | Rating |
|---|---|
| Afrocritik | 7.2/10 |
| Pulse Nigeria | 7.0/10 |

Harmattan & Winter received positive reviews from music critics. Afrocritik writer Emmanuel Daraloye rated the album 7.2 out of 10, commending its title and Brymo's songwriting. Daraloye also said the album "holds its own as a meaningful body of work" and that "empathy and hope" are at its core. Pulse Nigeria's Motolani Alake awarded the album a rating of 7.0 out of 10, characterizing it as a "morose album, filled with terse ideas of love and admittance of imperfection". Conversely, Alake said the album's "sonic topography was impacted by Brymo's decision to interweave love songs with pessimistic records".

Music critic Michael Kolawole called the album "a compelling portrait of an artist devoted to good music", and praised its instrumentation. Kolawole also said the singer's "emotionally wrecking lyrics provide a feeling that's hard to neglect".

== Track listing ==
All tracks are written by Ọlawale Ọlọfọrọ and produced by Bigfoot.

| No. | Title | Length |
|---|---|---|
| 1. | "F**king Awesome" | 3:48 |
| 2. | "Harmattan & Winter" | 3:00 |
| 3. | "The Dark" | 1:28 |
| 4. | "I Don't Have a Heart" | 2:53 |
| 5. | "Beast" | 3:00 |
| 6. | "Winifred" | 2:17 |
| 7. | "Emotions and Limbs" | 4:04 |
| 8. | "We All Lose Sometimes" | 3:02 |
| 9. | "There's a Place" | 3:47 |
| Total length: | | 27:00 |

== Personnel ==
- Ọlawale Ọlọfọrọ – primary artist, writer, performer
- Bigfoot – mixing, production (all tracks)

== Release history ==
Release formats for 9: Harmattan & Winter
| Region | Date | Format | Label | Ref. |
|---|---|---|---|---|
| Various | September 9, 2021 | Digital download, streaming | Independent | |
