= 9: Èsan =

Studio album by Brymo
- Released: September 9, 2021
- Genres: Afro-soul; alt-rock; sentimental ballad; folk music
- Length: 25:00
- Language: Yoruba
- Label: Independent
- Producer: Mikky Me Joses

Brymo chronology
Libel (2020)	9: Èsan (2021)	9: Harmattan & Winter (2021)

9: Èsan, also known simply as Èsan (Yoruba: Revenge), is the eighth studio album by Nigerian singer Brymo. It was released on September 9, 2021, along with 9: Harmattan & Winter. The album represents a change from the sarcasm of Libel and the hedonistic viewpoint of Yellow. Èsan comprises nine tracks and was produced and mastered by Mikky Me Joses. It was recorded entirely in the Yoruba language and is a mixture of afro-soul, alternative rock, sentimental ballad, and Yoruba folk music. Thematically, the album deals with masculinity, exuberance, self-adulation, narcissism, and promiscuity. Èsan was nominated for Best Alternative Album and Album of the Year at The Headies 2022.

== Background ==
Brymo released Èsan on September 9, 2021, along with his ninth studio album Harmattan & Winter. Èsan comprises nine tracks and was produced and mastered entirely by Brymo's frequent collaborator Mikky Me Joses. It represents a change from the sarcasm and denial of Libel, and the hedonistic viewpoint of Yellow. Brymo dedicated Èsan to his significant other and described it as an ode to every woman, man, sigma, and order. He also said the record pays homage to karma and to the seasons. Recorded entirely in Yoruba, the album is a mixture of afro-soul, alternative rock, sentimental ballad, and Yoruba folk music. Èsan deals with themes of masculinity, exuberance, self-adulation, narcissism, and promiscuity. Moreover, it addresses the End SARS protests and contains a satirical commentary on religion.

== Music and lyrics ==
On the album's opener "Àkọ́kọ́", which translates to "The First" or "Number One", Brymo depicts a character who is self-indulgent and narcissistic. The Lagos Review's Adeola Juwon praised the backup singers' harmonization and said Brymo "achieved perfection" on the song. The love ballad "Méjì Méjì" (Yoruba: "Double Double") examines life's dualities and paradoxes. The track "Ọkùnrin Mẹ́ta", which literally translates to "Three Men", is composed of two verses. In the first verse, Brymo accepts his ordinariness and vulnerability, and in the second, he sees himself as the light that dispels the darkness. The love song "Ọkán mi ti fọ́ Wẹ́wé", which Brymo called a "pro-monogamy" track, translates to "My Heart is Shattered into Pieces". The song depicts pain and mourns an unattainable love.

"Tèmi nì Tèmi" (Yoruba: "Mine is Mine") features a subtle socio-political take, specifically in its first verse. On the record, Brymo shows commitment to his lover and pleads with her to forgive him. In the love ballad "Òkùnkùn" (Yoruba: "Darkness"), Brymo asserts that only love can save him and that human beings descended from darkness. The politically inspired track "Alelúyà Méje" (Yoruba: "Seven Hallelujah") is a satirical commentary on society, with its title taking a sarcastic aim at religion. On the record, Brymo criticizes political leaders, addresses masculinity, and condemns promiscuity. "Fura Sára" appeals to lovers to avoid doubters and be wary of them; it also emphasizes the value of privacy. Music critic Michael Kolawole said the song draws parallel to Oṣó's "Bá’núsọ".

On the album's closing track, "Áarè", Brymo addresses the End SARS protests and uses satire to criticized President Buhari's remarks to Nigerians during the protests. Pulse Nigeria's Motolani Alake commended the song for "lending credence to the album's title".

== Critical reception ==
Professional ratings
Review scores
Source	Rating
Pulse Nigeria	7.9/10

Èsan received positive reviews from music critics. Writing for The Lagos Review, Adeola Juwon praised the album's production and highlighted "Àkọ́kọ́", "Ọkùnrin Mẹ́ta" and "Ọkán mi ti fọ́ Wẹ́wé" as standout tracks. Pulse Nigeria's Motolani Alake gave the album a rating of 7.9 out of 10, praising its songs for "standing out individually" and commending Brymo for not "making a remotely average body of work". Conversely, Alake felt the songs "seemed off as a body of work". Michael Kolawole, whose review was posted on the website Music in Africa, characterized Èsan as "an exemplary Yoruba album that tells outstanding stories with panache and detail".

=== Accolades ===
Year	Awards ceremony	Award description(s)	Recipient	Results	Ref
2022	The Headies	Best Alternative Album	Èsan	Nominated	
2022	The Headies	Album of the Year	Èsan	Nominated	
2022	The Headies	Best Alternative Song	"Méjì Méjì"	Nominated	
2022	The Headies	Best Recording of the Year	"Méjì Méjì"	Nominated	
2022	The Headies	Best Vocal Performance (Male)	Himself	Nominated	
2022	The Headies	Songwriter of the Year	Himself	Nominated	

== Track listing ==
All tracks are written by Ọlawale Ọlọfọrọ and produced by Mikky Me Joses.

No.	Title	Length
1.	"Àkọ́kọ́"	2:44
2.	"Méjì Méjì"	4:05
3.	"Ọkùnrin Mẹ́ta (Ẹ̀dùn Ọkàn)"	3:01
4.	"Ọkán mi ti fọ́ Wẹ́wé"	2:51
5.	"Tèmi nì Tèmi"	3:11
6.	"Òkùnkùn"	1:32
7.	"Alelúyà Méje"	2:56
8.	"Fura Sára"	2:40
9.	"Áarè"	1:58
Total length:		25:00

== Personnel ==
- Ọlawale Ọlọfọrọ – primary artist, writer, performer
- Mikky Me Joses – mixing, production (all tracks)

== Release history ==
Release formats for 9: Èsan
Region	Date	Format	Label	Ref.
Various	September 9, 2021	Digital download, streaming	Independent	
