= Asikey =

Nigerian singer-songwriter

- Born: Asikiya Albright George
- Genres: Soul; alt-rock; pop
- Occupations: Singer; songwriter; guitarist
- Instruments: Vocals; guitar
- Label: Pendulum Records (former)

Asikiya Albright George, known simply as Asikey or Asikey George, is a Nigerian singer and songwriter. Her music is a mixture of alternative rock, pop and soul. In 2017, she won Best Female Artist in Inspirational Music at the All Africa Music Awards. The Daily Trust newspaper named Asikey one of the top ten Nigerian musicians of 2017.

== Early life and education ==
Asikey was born into a family from Rivers State, but spent her early years in Ogun State. She studied history and international studies at the University of Nigeria. Although Asikey had a Christian upbringing and incorporates religious themes into her music, she identifies as non-religious.

== Music career ==
Media outlets have compared Asikey to Aṣa because of her musical style, with TooXclusive calling her "Africa's next Asa". In a 2017 interview with Afrovibe, she acknowledged Aṣa's influence on her music, highlighting the impact that Bed of Stone had on her.

Asikey released her debut extended play (EP), Human, under Pendulum Records in 2016. It was promoted and marketed by Lanre Lawal's Bail Music Company. Comprising seven tracks, Human grapples with existential topics like freedom and existence. It received positive reviews from critics and consumers, with many praising its distinctive flair. Reviewing for 360nobs, Wilfried Okichie said the record "takes a subtler path using understated production and effective song writing that can be a detriment in these parts."

Asikey's 7-track second extended play, Yellow, was released on 1 May 2020. It was produced entirely by Mikky Me Joses and features a collaboration with singer Brymo. The EP explores topics such as mental health, self-love and upliftment. In a review for Pulse Nigeria, Motolani Alake awarded Yellow a rating of seven out of ten, praising its production and commending Asikey for making her words believable and "projecting her honesty".

== Discography ==
EPs

- Human (2016)
- Yellow (2020)

Selected singles

- "Dark" (2017)
- "Love with You" (2019)
- "We (Don't Let Me Go)" (2019)
