= Klĭtôrĭs =

Studio album by Brymo
- Released: 9 May 2016
- Recorded: 2015–2016
- Genres: Yoruba music; Afrobeat; pop; soul
- Length: 35:00
- Languages: English; Yoruba
- Label: Independent
- Producer: Mikky Me Joses

Brymo chronology
Trance (2015)	Klĭtôrĭs (2016)	Oṣó (2018)

Singles from Klĭtôrĭs
- 1. "Happy Memories" Released: April 25, 2016; 2. "Something Good is Happening" Released: June 20, 2016; 3. "Alajọ Ṣomolu" Released: September 4, 2016; 4. "Billion Naira Dream" Released: January 10, 2017

Klĭtôrĭs (Greek: Key) is the fifth studio album by Nigerian singer Brymo. It was made available for pre-order on iTunes before its independent release on May 9, 2016. The album comprises eleven tracks and was supported by the singles "Happy Memories", "Something Good is Happening", "Alajọ Ṣomolu", and "Billion Naira Dream". Brymo's wife Esse Kakada, who was his girlfriend at the time of the album's release, is featured on the song "Naked". Pulse Nigeria included Klĭtôrĭs among the 10 Best Nigerian Albums of 2016. Klĭtôrĭs was nominated for Best R&B/Pop Album at The Headies 2016 and for Album of the Year at The Headies 2018.

== Background and promotion ==
Klĭtôrĭs was recorded between 2015 and 2016. The album's original cover art was designed by Georgi Georgiev of Moonring Art Design. It features the eerie picture of a half-naked lady, a beast with large antlers, and a rotting bird. An edited version of the artwork was done by Duks after iTunes refused to put up the original artwork. In an interview with Nigerian Entertainment Today, Brymo said the album's title means key in the Greek language and that the album is an expression of love and the uncertainty of it. He said, "the album is the key to a certain door I have knocked on for years; and yes it was meant to be sensual, there ought to be two sides to the coin".

The album's lead single, "Happy Memories", was released on April 25, 2016. The second single, "Something Good is Happening", was released on June 20, 2016, along with its music video. Directed by Uche Chukwu, the video depicts the daily lifestyle of the average Nigerian. Each scene in the video tells a story of an individual's approach to life, both young and old. Brymo premiered the music video for the album's third single, "Alajọ Ṣomolu", on September 4, 2016. The video was directed by Chukwu and showcases Brymo's portrayal of the popular Ṣomolu-based thrift collector. It is set in a coffee shop at the Jazz Hole and displays music recorded by Miles Davis'.

The album's fourth single, "Billion Naira Dream", was released on January 10, 2017, along with its music video. Co-directed by cinematographers Dare and Chukwu, the video reveals an intimate side of the singer.

== Composition ==
"Naked", the album's opener, consists of a consortium of instruments such as the shekere, iya ilu, and marimba; the record talks about the kind of consuming love that burns and leaves nothing behind. The patriotic track "Dem Dey Go" is an allegory for Nigeria's current fragile state. In an interview with This Day newspaper, Brymo said the song is about fixing the problems in Nigeria and that its lyrics make reference to the country's three major tribes. In "Happy Memories", Brymo recalls a man lost in the vastness of love's simple pleasures. The Afrobeat dance-fest "Alajọ Ṣomolu" is a nod to the famed thrift collectors of old Shomolu market. The folksy track "Ko Ṣ'aya Mi" features a chant-like chorus and timed interludes that is reminiscent of spoken word.

In "Let's Make Love", Brymo reflects on his greed and sins. Michael Kolawole described the song as "a moment of reflection disguised as lovemaking" and likened it to "Naked". Moreover, Kolawole said both songs are "moments of clarity, self-consciousness and discovery for Brymo". In "Mirage", listeners are left to comprehend things on their own. The electro-house record "The Way the Cookie Crumbles" explores sonic experimentation and is reminiscent of semi-pop records from the 1980s and 1990s.

== Critical reception ==
Professional ratings
Review scores
Source	Rating
Pulse Nigeria	4.5/5 stars
TooXclusive	4.5/5 stars

Klĭtôrĭs received positive critical acclaim from music critics. In a review for Pulse Nigeria, Joey Akan described the album as a "formula that has yielded dividends with each new application" and acknowledged Brymo for exploring the theme of love. Ade Tayo of Simply African Music said the album "makes the art of storytelling king" and described it as being very "cultural, multi-faceted and assorted". In a review for the website Music in Africa, music journalist Oris Aigbokhaevbolo wrote that although the album isn't quite as excellent as Tabula Rasa, it is a "much happier album than its predecessor".

Tope Delano of TooXclusive praised the album's storytelling technique and artful arrangement, saying it is "no doubt a reaffirmation that he is king of soul and even better, a grown man, lover and best friend". Reviewing for 360nobs, Wilfred Okichie characterized the album as a "damn fine record" and said its "mixing, composition and finish is indeed second to none". Udochukwu Ikwuagwu of Legit.ng stated that Klĭtôrĭs "shows a melancholic Brymo and his sad thoughts, he chirps in some optimism in-between the sheets".

=== Accolades ===
Year	Awards ceremony	Award description(s)	Recipient	Results
2018	The Headies	Album of the Year	Klĭtôrĭs	Nominated
2016	The Headies	Best R&B/Pop Album	Klĭtôrĭs	Nominated
2016	The Headies	Best Recording of the Year	"Something Good is Happening"	Nominated
2016	The Headies	Best Vocal Performance (Male)	Brymo	Nominated

== Track listing ==
All tracks are written by Olawale Ashimi and produced by Mikky Me Joses.

No.	Title	Length
1.	"Naked" (featuring Esse)	2:56
2.	"Dem Dey Go"	2:51
3.	"Happy Memories"	3:46
4.	"Ko Ṣ'aya Mi"	3:29
5.	"Alajọ Ṣomolu"	3:26
6.	"Something Good is Happening"	3:32
7.	"Billion Naira Dream"	4:45
8.	"Let's Make Love"	3:11
9.	"Mirage"	3:22
10.	"The Way the Cookie Crumbles"	2:33
11.	"The Girl from New York"	1:13
Total length:		35:00

== Release history ==
Region	Date	Version	Format
Various	May 9, 2016	Standard	CD; digital download
