= Neza (singer) =

Rwandan-Canadian singer (born 1984)

- Born: Neza Patricia Masozera; December 23, 1984 (age 41); Kinshasa, Zaire
- Genres: afropop
- Occupations: Musician, Singer
- Label: MCG Empire

Neza Patricia Masozera, (born 23 December 1984) better known by her stage name Neza, is a Rwandan-Canadian based afropop singer. In 2017, she was awarded as the Most Promising Artist in Africa by All Africa Music Awards.

== Early ==
Neza Lost her father at an early age and was raised by her widowed mother. Due to a famine in their home country, Zaire, the family moved to Rwanda in 1995. Three years later, the family relocated to Toronto, Canada as a result of her sister's desire to provide a better and more secure life for her.

== Career ==
Neza started music the early 2000s, and has since then taken off developing into the eclectic talent. In winter 2010, Neza released a 7 track EP entitled 'Brand New', which featured the single 'Go Gettaz'. The track was also featured on DJ Charlie Brown's r&b mixtape 'Brown Billz – R&B Edition'. Her remix video for French Montana's 'Pop That' released September 2012, generated 2000+ views in the first 3 weeks and was aired on national television in Rwanda. In 2016 she released a single with video: Tambola which was highly praised, but is almost nowhere to be found on the internet. In 2017, Neza relocated to Lagos, Nigeria, and got signed by Nigerian Singer, Mc Galaxy to his label, MCG Empire. Neza released three singles (Uranyica, Shaba & Vibe) under the label. She also featured on Nigerian artist Skales' Album two singles "Gbe" and "Good Life".

== Discography ==
Singles

- "My Baby" ft MC Galaxy
- "Shabba"
- "Vibe" ft MC Galaxy
- "Slay Mama"
- "Only God Knows"

As featured artist

- "Deejay Pius" - Tempramido feat. Mc Galaxy & Neza
- MC Galaxy – "Snapchat" feat. Neza, Kelly Pyle & Musicman TY
- MC Galaxy ft Neza - "Jacurb Dance"

== Awards ==
=== Won ===
- 2012 African Entertainment Awards, Canada - Best Female Artist of the Year
- 2017 All Africa Music Awards - Most Promising Artiste in Africa

=== Nominations ===
- 2018 All Africa Music Awards - Best Female Artiste in Eastern African
