= A.A.A (EP) =

EP by A.A.A
- Released: August 5, 2019
- Recorded: 2019
- Studio: Blackstar Studios
- Genre: Folk; psychedelic rock
- Length: 24:00
- Label: Independent
- Producer: A.A.A; Mikky Me Joses

Brymo chronology
Oṣó (2018)	A.A.A (2019)	Live! at Terra Kulture Arena (2019)

A.A.A is the eponymous debut extended play by Nigerian alternative rock band A.A.A. It was recorded at Blackstar Studios in Ikoyi and released on August 5, 2019. The band is composed of singer Brymo, guitarist Jad Moukarim, drummer Adey Omotade, and bassist Laughter. A.A.A comprises five tracks and is a fusion of folk music, psychedelic rock and African rhythms; it was mixed and mastered by Mikky Me Joses.

== Composition ==
On the folk and rock-tinged opening track "Johnbull", Brymo introduces listeners to a nominal character who left home in search of a better life. Jad Moukarim's electric guitar riff is included in the song, which takes its title from a well-known nursery tale. The rock-infused track "Mary Had an Orgasm" is about a titular lady who ends up having sexual relations with a man she hires to show her around the city. The Lagos Review's Adeola Juwon said the song makes reference to the female genitalia and acknowledged it for being "brazenly explicit".

In the soulful ballad "Take Me Back to November", Brymo pleads to be taken back to a time when he had the trust of a loved one; the song also depicts a time when his relationship with the person was in good standing. In "Golden Eyes", Brymo is plagued by the ghost of the romance that ended in the preceding song. On the closing track "The in-Between", he encourages listeners to keep persevering, pushing and striving.

== Critical reception ==
A.A.A received positive reviews from music critics. A writer for Filter Free Nigeria, who goes by the moniker the Waistbead Whisperer, praised the EP's sound curation, production, thematic style, and lyrics. The Waistbead Whisperer also said the record "carries Brymo away from the enclosure of his usual sound to a slightly more upbeat realm while still maintaining the otherworldliness of his lyrics". Adewojumi Aderemi of Konbini Channels called A.A.A a "universal body of work" and characterized it as a "refreshing exploration of a plethora of sounds that we simply aren't used to hearing". Music critic Michael Kolawole said the EP is a "decent experimental piece and a litmus test that foretells what Brymo’s next project may sound like".

Writing for The Lagos Review, Adeola Juwon praised the production, lyricism, and Brymo's songwriting. Moreover, Juwon said the record "dwells on loss, relationships in their dying stages, and unrequited love".

== Track listing ==
All tracks are written by Ọlawale Ọlọfọrọ and co-produced by A.A.A and Mikky Me Joses.

No.	Title	Length
1.	"Johnbull"	5:25
2.	"Mary Had an Orgasm"	4:05
3.	"Take Me Back to November"	3:23
4.	"Golden Eyes"	4:08
5.	"The in-Between"	7:14
Total length:		24:00

== Personnel ==
Credits adapted from a press release posted on Jaguda.com.

- Ọlawale Ọlọfọrọ – lead vocals, production (all tracks)
- Jad Moukarim – lead guitar, production (all tracks)
- Adey Omotade – drums, production (all tracks)
- Laughter – bass guitar, production (all tracks)
- Mikky Me Joses – mixing, mastering, additional production (all tracks)

== Release history ==
Region	Date	Format	Version	Label
Various	August 5, 2019	Digital download	Standard	Independent
