= Yellow (Brymo album) =

Studio album by Brymo
- Released: 1 April 2020
- Genres: Sentimental ballad; alt-pop; trap; sophisti-pop; shoegaze; rock; synth-pop; folk
- Length: 47:00
- Languages: English; Nigerian Pidgin; Yoruba; Igbo
- Label: Independent
- Producers: Mikky Me Joses; Nsikak David; Lindsey Abudei

Brymo chronology
Live! at Terra Kulture Arena (2019)	Yellow (2020)	Libel (2020)

Singles from Yellow
- 1. "Strippers + White Lines" Released: 31 March 2020

Yellow is the seventh studio album by Nigerian singer Brymo, independently released on 1 April 2020. The album explores hedonistic viewpoints and is a departure from the dark themes of his sixth studio album, Oṣó. Brymo described Yellow as an album about "love and survival", and said it is an alternative pop and electronic record. The album is a mixture of sentimental ballad, trap, sophisti-pop, shoegaze, rock, synth-pop and folk. Nigerian singer Lindsey Abudei is the only artist to be featured on the album.

Yellow was initially intended to have 17 songs but due to technical issues, two songs were omitted from the project. The album was supported by the single "Strippers + White Lines", and was nominated for Best Alternative Album and Album of the Year at The Headies 2020. Yellow was removed from streaming platforms in May 2023; according to Brymo, Abudei was unhappy with how he handled her involvement in the project. "Abụ Ya", a track recorded and written solely by Abudei, was excluded from the track list when the album was reinstated on streaming services.

== Background and promotion ==
Yellow explores hedonistic viewpoints and is a departure from the dark themes deployed on Brymo's previous studio album Oṣó. Brymo began recording Yellow in April 2018 and completed it within 16 months. He said he recorded Yellow after becoming a different person from who he used to be. Brymo unveiled the album's cover art and track list in March 2020. He described Yellow as an album about "love and survival", and said it would be an alternative pop and electronic record. Its cover art is a rendition of Insight and Frustrations 2020, a painting by Nigerian artist Samuel Olowomeye Ancestor, whose melancholic painting depicts an eerie, half-faced female with a lit cigar in her mouth. Brymo said on Instagram he was drawn to the painting after having several conversations with his friends.

With the exception of "Abụ Ya", which Nsikak David and Lindsey Abudei co-produced, Yellow was produced and engineered by Brymo's frequent collaborator Mikky Me Joses. The album explores topics such as love, heartbreak, socio-politics, mental health, betrayal and ego. Yellow spans three sides and initially included seventeen tracks, six of which were recorded in English, five in Nigerian Pidgin, five in Yoruba and one in Igbo. The album's three sides were numbered in Arabic, Roman and English numerals, respectively. On 24 March, Brymo cited technical reasons for omitting the tracks "Iya Awele" and "Ife" from the album.

The album's lead single "Strippers + White Lines" was released on 1 April 2020. Mikky Me Joses produced the track, which is a mixture of R&B, alternative music and sentimental ballad. "Strippers + White Lines" discusses life's struggles, depression and hope. Promise Charles filmed the song's accompanying music video for In Touch Films. Yellow was removed from streaming platforms in May 2023; according to Brymo, Abudei was unhappy with how he handled her involvement in the project. "Abụ Ya", a track recorded and written solely by Abudei, was excluded from the track list when the album was reinstated on streaming services.

== Composition ==
Yellow is a sentimental ballad, trap, alternative pop, sophisti-pop, shoegaze, rock, synth-pop and folk album. On the album's opening track "Espirit De Corps", Brymo examines the socio-politics of a decaying society; the song's production features a trap beat. "Blackmail" addresses the risks emotional blackmail presents to relationships; the song contains drums and guitar solos that are commonly used in smooth jazz and soft rock. "Ozymandias" is about a man who takes a woman's love without reciprocating; the song is a tale of self-criticism and self-awareness. In the baroque pop track "Heartbreak Songs are Better in English", Brymo sings about his wish to emotively express his heartbreak despite his society's taboo against it. The sentimental ballad "Strippers + White Lines" is symbolic of mental slavery. In the ballad "Without You", Brymo sings about the problematic relationship between a man and a woman who refuse to live without each other despite acknowledging their own flaws.

The neo-soul track "Woman" is dedicated to Brymo's unnamed partner, and includes drums and a bass riff. In "Black Man, Black Woman", Brymo discusses the advantages and disadvantages of gender roles and social norms. The pop-infused, soul and blues track "Gambu" depicts a woman's love for an imperfect man with a reputation. "Rara Rira" is an alternative pop song with a folk percussion; it describes carefree people who enjoy life and live on the edge. The pop song "Brain Gain", which is reminiscent of songs by Gabriella Cilmi and Duffy, includes a trumpet solo and addresses topics such as immigration. "Ọ̀run n Móoru" (Yoruba: "Heaven is Heated") is a ballad that criticizes gossip among chiefs and kings. In "A F'èédú Fan'ná", Brymo makes references to his grandmother and implants a proverbial fire in listeners' minds. The acoustic track "Abụ Ya", which translates to "his/her hymn", is about the difficult relationship between Brymo and his lover.

== Critical reception ==
Professional ratings
Review scores
Source	Rating
Pulse Nigeria	9.7/10

Yellow received positive critical acclaim from critics. Pulse Nigeria's Motolani Alake awarded the album a rating of 9.7 out of 10, commending Brymo for using "symbolism and metaphor to breakdown his topics". Alake also notes the album is "built on resonant topics cut from the larger society". Reviewing for BellaNaija, Notiki Bello called Yellow "robust and rigorous", and described it as a "well-written book of fiction that is sung without the tedious effort of thumbing through hundreds of pages". Iyke Bede of newspaper This Day commended Yellow for being "a testament of years of continued honing of craft and sheer consistency, and not just another album". Bede also said the album's tracks can "fit snugly into any of Brymo's past albums without one noticing any seismic shift in sound".

Writing for The Lagos Review, Joy Dennis called the album a "masterpiece" and said it "details the musings of its creator, about love, psychology, the African society, and the black man". The Nigerian Tribune writer Kola Muhammed praised Brymo's bilingual approach and commended him for "swathing his message with wit and metaphysical conceits". In a less enthusiastic review, Dami Ajayi said Yellow "pales behind his last three studio albums" despite it "pushing his craft in new directions"; Ajayi was also critical of side A. Toni Kan criticized Brymo for "producing an album with something for everyone".

Yellow was nominated for Best Alternative Album and Album of the Year at The Headies 2020. Brymo won Best Recording of the Year for "Ozymandias" at the ceremony.

== Track listing ==
All tracks are written by Ọlawale Ọlọfọrọ and produced by Mikky Me Joses, except for "Abụ Ya", which was written by Lindsey Abudei and co-produced by Abudei and Nsikak David.

Side A
No.	Title	Length
1.	"Espirt De Corps"	2:43
2.	"Blackmail"	3:38
3.	"Ozymandias"	2:17
4.	"Heartbreak Songs are Better in English"	3:53
5.	"Strippers + White Lines / Smart Monkey"	4:24
6.	"Without You"	4:07

Side B
No.	Title	Length
1.	"Woman"	2:50
2.	"Black Man, Black Woman"	3:41
3.	"Gambu"	2:36
4.	"Rara Rira"	3:24
5.	"Brain Gain"	2:08

Side C
No.	Title	Length
1.	"Adédọ̀tun"	2:56
2.	"Ọ̀run n Móoru"	2:29
3.	"A F'èédú Fan'ná"	3:32
4.	"Abụ Ya" (featuring Lindsey Abudei^{[a]})	2:54
Total length:		47:00

=== Notes ===
- ^[a] "Abụ Ya" was excluded from the track list when the album was reinstated on streaming services.

== Personnel ==
Credits adapted from the album's back cover.

- Ọlawale Ọlọfọrọ – primary artist, writer, performer
- Lindsey Abudei – featured artist, writer, production ("Abụ Ya")
- Mikky Me Joses – production, engineering (all tracks except "Abụ Ya")
- Nsikak David – production ("Abụ Ya")

== Release history ==
Release formats for Yellow
Region	Date	Format	Label	Ref.
Various	1 April 2020	CD, Digital download	Independent	
