= The Son of a Kapenta =

Studio album by Brymo
- Released: November 15, 2012
- Recorded: 2011–2012
- Genres: Afropop; fuji; soul; EDM; R&B; contemporary pop; techno
- Length: 55:00
- Languages: English; Nigerian Pidgin; Yoruba
- Label: Chocolate City
- Producers: Jesse Jagz; Legendury Beatz; E Kelly; Mikky Me Joses; Blaze; DMM Oluremi; Kid Konnect

Brymo chronology
Brymstone (2007)	The Son of a Kapenta (2012)	Merchants, Dealers & Slaves (2013)

Singles from The Son of a Kapenta
- 1. "Ara" Released: September 18, 2011; 2. "Good Morning" Released: April 16, 2012; 3. "Go Hard" Released: September 26, 2012

The Son of a Kapenta (abbreviated as SOAK) is the second studio album by Nigerian singer Brymo, released by Chocolate City on November 15, 2012. The album was recorded in English and Yoruba, and is primarily a mixture of Afropop, fuji, contemporary pop, soul, techno, EDM, and R&B. It features guest appearances from Jesse Jagz, Pryse, M.I, Ice Prince, and Efya. The Son of a Kapenta was produced by E Kelly, Mikky Me Joses, Legendury Beatz, Jesse Jagz, Blaze, DMM Oluremi, and Kid Konnect. It was supported by the singles "Ara", "Good Morning", and "Go Hard", and received positive reviews from music critics.

== Background and promotion ==
Brymo started recording The Son of a Kapenta after signing a contract with Chocolate City in 2010. His father's carpentry profession inspired the album's title. Prior to releasing his label debut "Ara", Brymo recorded "Action Film", "Love You", and "Oleku" with M.I, Jesse Jagz, and Ice Prince, respectively. The Son of a Kapenta is primarily a mixture of Afropop, fuji, contemporary pop, techno, soul, EDM, and R&B.

In a 2012 interview with The Punch, Brymo described the album as a summary of his life and said each song is a reflection of his energy. He also said he recorded the album to be identified by his body of work as a lead artist rather than as a featured artist. The Son of a Kapenta features collaborations with Jesse Jagz, Pryse, M.I, Ice Prince and Efya. It was produced by E Kelly, Mikky Me Joses, Legendury Beatz, Jesse Jagz, Blaze, DMM Oluremi and Kid Konnect. The album suffered a botched roll out and wasn't given the full big label push. As a result of this, it was included on The Nation's list of the "Albums that failed commercially in 2012".

=== Singles ===
On September 18, 2011, Brymo released the album's lead single "Ara", which was produced by the record producing duo Legendury Beatz. "Ara" loosely translates to Wonder and was written six months after the singer recorded "Good Morning". Brymo recorded the track while being under pressure from Chocolate City to submit a single. The accompanying music video for "Ara" was filmed by the production company Aje Filmworks. The video was primarily shown in monochrome with occasional bursts of color. Brymo won Best Recording of the Year and was nominated for Best Vocal Performance (Male) for "Ara" at The Headies 2012.

On April 16, 2012, Brymo released "Good Morning" as the album's second single. The song's music video was also filmed by Aje Filmworks and released on 30 July 2012. "Good Morning" was nominated for Best Recording of the Year at The Headies 2013. The album's third single, "Go Hard", was released on September 26, 2012. Produced by Jesse Jagz, the track has elements of Azonto and was described as an "energetic dance song". On March 28, 2013, Brymo released a documentary-style video for "Omoge Campus", which was filmed in Ibadan. The video depicts the story of a NYSC member who misses his significant other.

== Composition ==
Conceptually, The Son of a Kapenta is composed of three chapters: Birth, Dealer and Lover. The Birth chapter includes the songs "1986", "Life is too Short", "Ara", and "Now Now". Tracks such as "Go Hard", "Omoge Campus", "Rendezvous", and "Akara" fall under Dealer. The album's remaining songs fit into the Lover chapter. On the album's opener "1986", Brymo remembers the sacrifices his mother made for him and the pain she went through giving birth to him. The Mikky Me Joses-produced track "Life is too Short" is a fusion of pop and EDM. "Ara" fuses Afrobeat and techno.

In "Now Now", Brymo wants his blessings to occur quickly. The hip-hop-influenced track "Go Hard" is reminiscent of Timbaland & Magoo's "Drop". In the highlife-inspired track "Omoge Campus", Brymo sings about the love he has for a girl on campus. In "If You Were Mine", he wonders if his love interest will catch him when he falls. The dance track "Your Love" has an electro-pop feel. "See Me" has elements of rock music. The DMM Oluremi-produced track "We All Need Something" discusses what it takes to be human.

== Critical reception ==
Professional ratings
Review scores
Source	Rating
Jaguda	9.5/10
360nobs	7.4/10
Nigerian Entertainment Today	4/5 stars
TooXclusive	3.5/5 stars

The Son of a Kapenta received positive reviews from music critics. In a review for Jaguda, Ayo Jaguda rated the album 9.5 out of 10, praising its production and commending everyone who worked on it. Jaguda also said the album was "well packaged" and felt like Brymo's "freshman album". Reviewing for Nigerian Entertainment Today, Ayomide Tayo granted the album 4 stars out of 5, commending Brymo for "composing songs that are well thought out and layered". Tayo also acknowledged Brymo for knocking together "different sounds, choruses, verses and ideas to create an album worthy of his status".

A writer for 360nobs, who goes by the moniker Shadenonconformist, praised the album's production and Brymo's voice. Shadenonconformist said the record "shows a lot of growth and maturity both in Brymo's sound and willingness to dabble in other music genres", but criticized it for sounding "repetitive at certain intervals". Ogaga Sakpaide of TooXclusive did a track-by-track review of the album and gave it 3.5 stars out of 5.

== Tracklisting ==
No.	Title	Writer(s)	Producer(s)	Length
1.	"1986"	Olawale Ashimi	E-Kelly	4:00
2.	"Life is too Short"	Ashimi	Mikky Me Joses	3:33
3.	"Ara"	Ashimi	Legendury Beatz	4:16
4.	"Now Now" (featuring Jesse Jagz)	Ashimi; Jesse Abaga	Jesse Jagz	4:08
5.	"Go Hard"	Ashimi	Jesse Jagz	3:21
6.	"Omoge Campus"	Ashimi	E-Kelly	3:24
7.	"Rendezvous (Interlude)"	—	—	1:10
8.	"Akara"	Ashimi	E-Kelly	3:12
9.	"If You Were Mine"	Ashimi	E Kelly	3:53
10.	"Good Morning"	Ashimi	Jesse Jagz	4:19
11.	"Your Love"	Ashimi	Blaze	4:08
12.	"See Me"	Ashimi		3:29
13.	"You'll Come Back" (featuring Efya)	Ashimi; Jane Awindor		3:43
14.	"We All Need Something"	Ashimi	DMM Oluremi	3:10

The Son of a Kapenta – Bonus track
No.	Title	Writer(s)	Producer(s)	Length
15.	"Chocolate" (featuring Pryse, Ice Prince, M.I and Jesse Jagz)	Ashimi; Pryse; Panshak Zamani; Abaga; Jude Abaga	Kid Konnect	5:02
Total length:				55:00

Notes

- "—" denotes an interlude

== Personnel ==
- Olawale Ashimi – primary artist, writer
- Jesse Abaga – featured artist, production (tracks 4, 5, 10)
- Jane Awindor – featured artist
- Pryse – featured artist
- Panshak Zamani – featured artist
- Jude Abaga – featured artist
- E Kelly – production (tracks 1, 6, 8, 9)
- Mikky Me Joses – production (track 2)
- Legendury Beatz – production (track 3)
- Blaze – production (track 11)
- DMM Oluremi – production (track 14)
- Kid Konnect – production (track 15)

== Release history ==
Region	Date	Format	Version	Label	Ref
Various	November 12, 2012	CD, Digital download	Standard	Chocolate City	
