= Merchants, Dealers & Slaves =

Studio album by Brymo
- Released: October 20, 2013
- Recorded: 2013
- Genre: Traditional pop; bluegrass; latin rock; reggae; afrobeat
- Length: 32:00
- Language: English; Nigerian Pidgin; Yoruba
- Label: Independent
- Producer: Mikky Me Joses

Brymo chronology
| The Son of a Kapenta (2012) | Merchants, Dealers & Slaves (2013) | Tabula Rasa (2014) |

Singles from Merchants, Dealers, & Slaves
- 1. "Down" Released: October 1, 2013; 2. "Eko" Released: October 21, 2013

Merchants, Dealers & Slaves (abbreviated as M, D & S) is the third studio album by Nigerian singer Brymo. It was made available for purchase as a digital download on October 20, 2013, and released six days after Chocolate City filed an interim injunction against Brymo. Mikky Me Joses produced the entire record, with guitar work done by a guitarist named David. M, D & S was supported by the singles "Down" and "Eko". Physical copies of the album were not allowed to circulate as a result of the injunction. The album's physical release was issued on March 26, 2014, a few days after the injunction was lifted.

M, D & S received critical acclaim from music critics, who called it "a masterpiece" and praised Brymo's vocal performance.

== Background and promotion ==
Brymo recorded M, D & S in 2013. He enlisted Mikky Me Joses to produce the entire project and worked with guitarist David to compose "Money". While recording M, D & S, Brymo announced on Twitter he parted ways with Chocolate City. His announcement was quickly refuted by Audu Maikori, who was CEO of Chocolate City at the time. In August 2013, Brymo signed a distribution deal with Spinlet, enabling the digital media company to distribute M, D & S online. Spinlet discontinued the deal after Chocolate City made them aware of its existing contract with Brymo.

On 14 October 2013, Chocolate City filed an interim injunction against Brymo, restraining him from partaking in musical ventures beyond the confines of his contract. On October 20, 2013, Brymo released the album despite reports about the injunction and revealed its track list two days prior. The following day, Brymo was restrained from releasing and distributing any musical work, pending Chocolate City's lawsuit against him. In March 2014, the Federal High Court of Lagos lifted the restraint it put on Brymo.

The album's lead single, "Down", was officially released on October 1, 2013. Its music video was uploaded to YouTube the previous day. Brymo dedicated the song to his family and country. According to a report by Nigerian Entertainment Today, undergraduate students at Southern Illinois University Carbondale did a lyrical decomposition of "Down" as part of their case study project. Brymo was invited to the school to attend the case study presentation. On October 21, 2013, "Eko" was released as the album's second single.

== Composition ==
M, D & S is a mixture of traditional pop, bluegrass, latin rock, reggae, and afrobeat. The album opens with "Truthfully", a slow tempo ballad that tackles themes of love and devotion. The reflective afrobeat-inspired track "Grand Pa" talks about a troubling grandfather with misplaced priorities. "Down" is a metaphor for the current political climate in Nigeria; the song addresses corruption and other problems plaguing Nigeria. The carefully crafted "Eko" has been described as a "chronicle of Brymo's arrival in Lagos". The reggae-tinged "Everyone Gets to Die" talks about the fickleness of life. "Purple Jar" has been described as a "poetic song that speaks of hurt". In the Yoruba ballad "Se Bo'timo", Brymo talks about one being deceived by people closest to them.

== Critical reception ==
Professional ratings
Review scores
| Source | Rating |
|---|---|
| Nigerian Entertainment Today | 4.5/5 stars |
| TooXclusive | 4.5/5 stars |

M, D & S received positive reviews from music critics. Writing for the blog Jaguda, Yetunde Ogunleye described the album as a spiritual experience and called it "genuinely beautiful, classic and progressive". Reviewing for YNaija, Wilfred Okichie characterized M, D & S as "a near masterpiece" and said it is the kind of record "you listen to and place the artiste at the top of your classics list. You want more immediately but music like this takes a while to come around so you contend yourself with repeat listens". Serubiri Moses of Bakwa magazine described the album as the "coming of age album for Brymo" and said it is "equally an impressionistic take on the historical injustices in Lagos".

In a review for Nigerian Entertainment Today, Ayomide Tayo praised Brymo's vocal performance and described the album as a "soulful masterpiece that is emotionally charged with amazing production". Fab magazine called M, D & S a "fusion of Yoruba adages, current Nigerian situations and passion". Ogaga Sakpaide of TooXclusive rated the album four-and-a-half stars out of five, applauding Brymo for delivering an "emotional, mysterious and poetic masterpiece that will stand the test of time". YNaija's Obi Ejiogu said the album "feels evocative of a different time and place, one far removed from the influences of current music industry trends".

== Track listing ==
All tracks are written by Olawale Ashimi and produced by Mikke Me Joses.

| No. | Title | Length |
|---|---|---|
| 1. | "Truthfully" | 3:16 |
| 2. | "Money" | 3:30 |
| 3. | "Dear Titilope" | 0:14 |
| 4. | "Eko" | 2:35 |
| 5. | "Grand Pa" | 3:11 |
| 6. | "Down" | 3:06 |
| 7. | "Cheap Wine" | 3:19 |
| 8. | "Purple Jar" | 4:01 |
| 9. | "Everyone Gets to Die" | 3:23 |
| 10. | "Se Bo'timo" | 3:56 |
| 11. | "M, D & S" | 1:23 |
| Total length: | | 32:00 |

== Release history ==
| Region | Date | Format | Version | Label |
|---|---|---|---|---|
| Various | October 20, 2013 | Digital download | Standard | Independent |
| Nigeria | March 26, 2014 | CD | Standard | Independent |
