= All Africa Music Awards =

Annual event

- Current: All Africa Music Awards 2022
- Presented by: International Committee of AFRIMA; African Union
- First award: December 27, 2014
- Website: afrima.org

All Africa Music Awards (also referred to as AFRIMA) is an annual awards event to reward and celebrate musical works, talents and creativity around the African continent while promoting the African cultural heritage. Its pioneer Awards show was held in 2014. The awards event was established by the International Committee AFRIMA, in collaboration with the African Union (AU).

== History ==
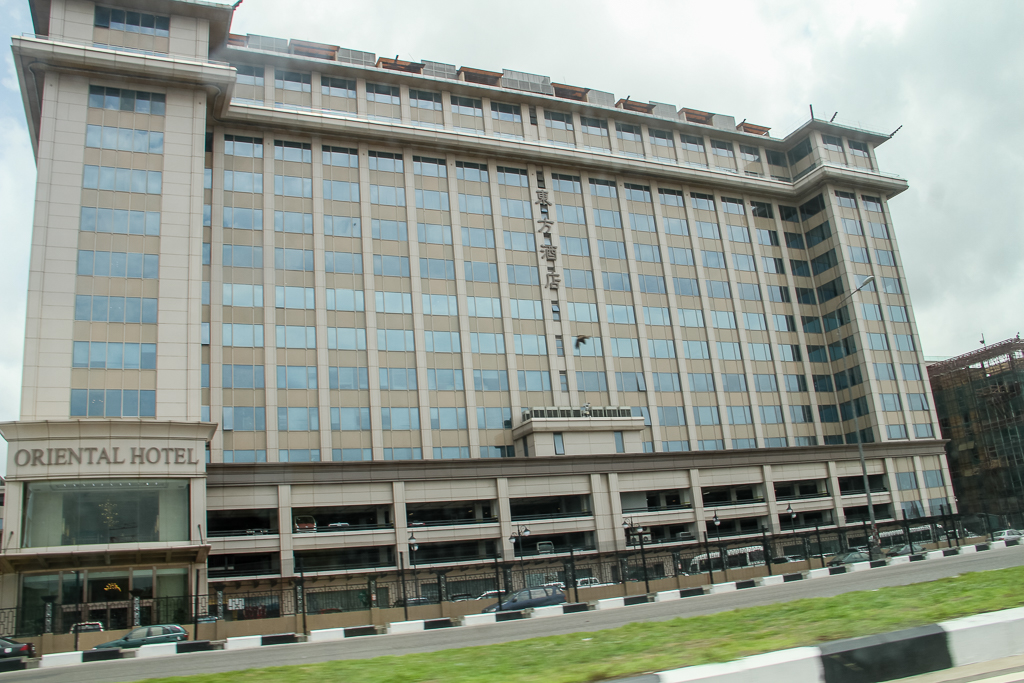
Oriental Hotel, Lagos, site of the first All Africa Music Awards

Nigeria has hosted three of the award editions during 2014–2016. Nigeria once again won the fourth-year hosting rights tenure in 2017. However, the Republic of Ghana was given the right to host the All Africa Music Awards for four consecutive years from December 2018 to 2020. On Monday, July 15, 2019, The International Committee of the All Africa Music Awards, (AFRIMA) withdrew the hosting rights from Republic of Ghana for the 2019 and 2020 editions of the All Africa Music Awards, AFRIMA, over lack of capacity by the Host Country to meet the financial and contractual obligations entered to on July 12, 2018, necessary to retain hosting the biggest music event in Africa. Due to the COVID-19 pandemic in 2020, AFRIMA did not hold as scheduled but returned in 2021 and was hosted in Lagos, Nigeria.

== Organisation ==
The International Committee of AFRIMA consists of five regions: SADEC, Eastern Africa, Central Africa, Northern, Southern Africa and Western Africa, which are run by regional directors and 54 country directors. Public votes determine which artists get awarded, alongside a jury of experienced African culture, media and music industry experts/professionals.

== Host cities ==
Year	Date	Country	Host city	Venue	Host(s)	Ref
2014	27 December	Nigeria	Lagos	Grand Ballroom, Oriental Hotel	2baba Idibia (Nigeria) and Maryse Acotie (Togo)	
2015	15 November	Nigeria	Lagos	Eko Convention Centre, Eko Hotel and Suites	DNG (Kenya) and Aurelie Eliam (Côte d'Ivoire)	
2016	6 November	Nigeria	Lagos	Eko Convention Centre, Eko Hotel and Suites	Ahmed Soultan (Morocco); Bonang Matheba (South Africa) and Ika De Jong (DR Congo)	
2017	12 November	Nigeria	Lagos	Eko Convention Centre, Eko Hotel and Suites	Akon (Senegal) and Sophy Aiida (Cameroon)	
2018	24 November	Ghana	Accra	Accra International Conference Centre	Michael Blackson (Ghana), Pearl Thusi (South Africa) and Anita Erskine (Ghana)	
2019	23 November	Nigeria	Lagos	Eko Convention Centre, Eko Hotel and Suites	Pearl Thusi (South Africa) and Eddie Kadi (Democratic Republic of the Congo)	
2021	21 November	Nigeria	Lagos	Eko Convention Centre, Eko Hotel and Suites	Pearl Thusi (South Africa) and Eddie Kadi (Democratic Republic of the Congo)	
2022	12–15 January 2023	Senegal	Dakar	Grand Arena, Dakar Senegal	Ahmed Sylla; Cameroonian actress and broadcaster, Sophy Aiida and South African screen gem, model and presenter, Pearl Thusi	

== Award categories ==
These awards consist of 37 prizes of two categories: region-based awards (covering the five African regions) overseeing the achievements of African artistes within their specific regions of origin and the genre-based continental awards.

=== Regional awards ===
1. Best Female Artiste in Central Africa
2. Best Male Artiste in Central Africa
3. Best Female Artiste in Western Africa
4. Best Male Artiste in Western Africa
5. Best Female Artiste in Eastern Africa
6. Best Male Artiste in Eastern Africa
7. Best Female Artiste in Northern Africa
8. Best Male Artiste in Northern Africa
9. Best Female Artiste in Southern Africa
10. Best Male Artiste in Southern Africa.

=== Continental awards ===
1. Artiste of the Year
2. African Fans' Favorite
3. Album of the Year
4. Best African Collaboration
5. Best African Contemporary
6. Best African Electro
7. Best African Group/Duo/Band
8. Best African Hip Hop
9. Best African Jazz
10. Best African Pop
11. Best African Reggae/Ragga/Dancehall
12. Best African RnB/Soul
13. Best African Rock
14. Best African Traditional
15. Best Female Inspirational
16. Best Male Inspirational
17. Best African DJ
18. Best African Lyricist/Rapper
19. Best African Act in Diaspora
20. Best African Dance/Choreography
21. AFRIMA Legend Award
22. Most Promising Artiste of the Year
23. Producer of the Year
24. Revelation of the African Continent
25. Song of the Year
26. Songwriter of the Year
27. Video of the Year.

== Past award winners ==
=== 2014 edition ===
Category	Winner	Country	Title
Artist of the Year	Afrotronix	Chad	Azaba
AFRIMA Legend Award	Fela Anikulapo Kuti	Nigeria	
Producer of the Year	Don Jazzy, Robbie Malinga and Mojalefa Thebe	Nigeria and South Africa	"Eminado" and "Impilo"
Song of the Year	Davido	Nigeria	"Aye"
Revelation of the African Continent	Wiyaala feat. Jupitar	Ghana	"Rock my body"
Best Video	Bez (Kemi Adetiba)	Nigeria	"Say"
Best Male Artist in Inspirational Music	Bro. Philemon feat. Morris	Ghana	"It is Well"
Best Female Artist in Inspirational Music	Nikki Laoye	Nigeria	"Only You"
Best African Rock	Dear Zim	Zimbabwe	"Indiana"
Best African Traditional Music	Adjiboye and Yinka Ayanda	Benin Republic and Nigeria	"Inna" and "Ise"
Best RnB and Soul	2Baba Idibia	Nigeria	"Dance in the Rain"
Best African Reggae, Ragga and Dancehall	Radio and Weasel	Uganda	"Breath Away"
Best African Pop	Elani	Kenya	"Kookoo"
Best African Hip Hop	Davido	Nigeria	"Aye (song)"
Best African Electro	Mi Casa	South Africa	"Jika"
Best African Contemporary	Angelique Kidjo	Benin Republic	"Shango Wa"
Most Promising Artist in Africa	Wiyaala	Ghana	"Rock My Body"
Best African Collaboration	D'banj and Friends	19 countries in Africa	"Cocoa Na Chocolate"
Best African Group/Duo/Band	Paul and Peter Okoye (P-Square)	Nigeria	"Personally"
Song Writer of the Year	Brymo	Nigeria	Down
Album of the Year	Olamide	Nigeria	Baddest Guy Ever Liveth
Best Male in Western Africa	Davido	Nigeria	"Skelewu"
Best Female in Western Africa	Angelique Kidjo	Benin Republic	"Shango Wa"
Best Male in Southern Africa	Heavy K feat. Professor	South Africa	"Beautiful War"
Best Female in Southern Africa	Cindy Munyavi	Zimbabwe	"Parere Moyo"
Best Male in Northern Africa	Ahmed Soultan	Morocco	"It’s Alright"
Best Female in Northern Africa	Noura Mint Seymali	Mauritania	"Tzenni"
Best Male in Eastern Africa	Diamond Platnumz	Tanzania	"Number One"
Best Female in Eastern Africa	Vanessa Mdee	Tanzania	"Cover"
Best Male in Central Africa	Fally Ipupa	DR Congo	"Original"
Best Female in Central Africa	Laurette La Perle	DR Congo	"Lembo La Mboka Ame"

=== 2015 edition ===
Category	Winner	Country	Title
Album of the Year	Charlotte Dipanda	Cameroon	Elle n'a pas vu
Song Writer of the Year	Jose Chameleone	Uganda	Wale Wale
Best African Group/Duo/Band	Sauti Sol	Kenya	Sura yako
Best African Collaboration	AKA ft Burna Boy, Dales and Jr	South Africa and Nigeria	All eyes on me
Most Promising Artiste in Africa	Kiss Daniel	Nigeria	Woju
Best Artist in African Contemporary	Charlotte Dipanda	Cameroon	Elle n'a pas vu
Best Artist in African Electro	Flavour	Nigeria	Power to win
Best Artist in African Hip Hop	Cassper Nyovest	South Africa	Ghetto
Best Artist in African Pop	Vanessa Mdee	Tanzania	Hawajui
Best Artist in Reggae, Ragga and Dancehall	Stonebwoy	Ghana	Pull Up (Remix)
Best Artist in African RnB and Soul	Praiz	Nigeria	If I fall
Best Artist in African Traditional Music	Gangbe Brass Band	Benin	Yoruba
AFRIMA Legend Award	Ladysmith Black Mambazo	South Africa	
Best Artist in African Rock	M'vula	Angola	Volume 10
Best Female Artist in Inspirational Music	Betty Akna	Equatorial Guinea	Africa united
Best Male Artist in Inspirational Music	Darey	Nigeria	Pray for me
Video of the Year in Africa	Wiyaala	Ghana	Africa
Revelation of the African Continent	Adekunle Gold	Nigeria	Sade
Song of the Year	Diamond Platnumz	Tanzania	Nasema Nawe
Best Artist in African Jazz	Kunle Ayo	Nigeria	Joromi
Artist of the Year	Diamond Platnumz	Tanzania	
Producer of the Year	Sauti Sol	Kenya	Sura yako
Music/Entertainment Journalist of the year	Oris Aigbokhaevbolo	Nigeria	Going Country: Nashville-Lives
Best Female in Central Africa	Charlotte Dipanda	Cameroon	Elle n'a pas vu
Best Male in Central Africa	Stanley Enow	Cameroon	King Kong
Best Female Artist in Eastern Africa	Tsedenia	Ethiopia	Yet Biye
Best Male in Eastern Africa	Diamond Platnumz	Tanzania	Nasema Nawe
Best Female Artist in Northern Africa	Manal	Morocco	Denia
Best Male Artist in Northern Africa	Ahmed Soultan	Morocco	This is who I am
Best Female in Southern Africa	Busiswa	South Africa	Lahla
Best Male in Southern Africa	Cassper Nyovest	South Africa	Ghetto
Best Female Artist in Western Africa	Yemi Alade	Nigeria	Kissing
Best Male Artist in Western Africa	Olamide	Nigeria	Bobo

=== 2016 edition ===
Category	Winner	Country	Title
Album of the Year	Ahmed Soultan	Morocco	Music Has No Boundaries
Song Writer of the Year	Unique	Uganda	Njogereza
Best African Group/Duo/Band	VVIP	Ghana	Dogo Yaro
Best African Collaboration	Eddy Kenzo and Niniola	Uganda and Nigeria	Mbilo Mbilo
Most Promising Artiste in Africa	Amine Aub	Morocco	Feel the Same
Best Artiste in African Contemporary	Flavour	Nigeria	Mmege Mmege
Best Artiste in African Electro	Such	Zimbabwe	You
Best Artiste in African Hip Hop	Stanley Enow	Cameroon	Work Hard
Best Artiste in African Pop	Diamond Platnumz	Tanzania	Utanipenda
Best Artiste in Reggae, Ragga and Dancehall	Patoranking	Nigeria	No kissing
Best Artiste in African RnB and Soul	Henok and Mehari Brothers	Ethiopia	Ewedi Shalehu
Best Artiste in African Traditional Music	Zainab	Benin	Bolojo
AFRIMA Legend Award	Manu Dibango	Cameroon	—N/a
Best Artiste in African Rock	M'vula	Angola	Tristezase Alegrias
Best Female Artiste in Inspirational Music	Naomi Achu	Cameroon	Busy Body
Best Male Artiste in Inspirational Music	Icha Kavons	DR Congo	Testimony
Video of the Year in Africa	VVIP	Ghana	Dogoyaro
Revelation of the African Continent	Falz	Nigeria	Bad Baddo Badest
Song of the Year	Diamond Platnumz	Tanzania	Utanipenda
Producer of the Year	Kuseim	Uganda	Mbilo Mbilo
Artiste of the Year	Wizkid	Nigeria	Final (Baba Nla)
Best Artiste in African Jazz	Jimmy Dludlu	South Africa	Ha Deva
Best Female in Central Africa	Bruna Tatiana	Angola	Prometo Mudar
Best Male in Central Africa	Wax Dey	Cameroon	Saka Makossa
Best Female Artist in Eastern Africa	Cindy Sanyu	Uganda	Still Standing
Best Male in Eastern Africa	Diamond Platnumz	Tanzania	Utanipenda
Best Female Artist in Northern Africa	Zina Daoudia	Morocco	La Waheed Wala Million
Best Female in Southern Africa	Sally Boss Madam	Namibia	Natural
Best Male in Southern Africa	Black Coffee	South Africa	Come with me
Best Male Artiste in Western Africa	Flavour	Nigeria	Dance
Best Female Artiste in West Africa	Aramide	Nigeria	I Don't Care

=== 2017 edition ===
Category	Winner	Country	Title
AFRIMA Legend Awards	Oliver Mutikudzi	Zimbabwe	—N/a
AFRIMA Legend Awards	Salif Keita	Mali	—N/a
Artist of the Year in Africa	Wizkid	Nigeria	Come Closer
Song of the Year in Africa	Wizkid	Nigeria	Come Closer
Producer of the Year	DJ Coublon (Sheyi Shay)	Nigeria	Yolo Yolo
Album of the Year in Africa	Eddy Kenzo	Uganda	Shuari Yako
Revelation of the Year	Shyn	Madagascar	Resim Pitia
Songwriter of the Year	Simi	Nigeria	Smile for Me
Video of the Year	Orezi(Adasa Cookey)	Nigeria	Cooking Pot
African Fans’ Favourite	The Dogg	Namibia	Shuukifa Kwi
Best Artist or Group in African Traditional	Halmelmal Abate	Ethiopia	Harar
Best Artist in African Pop	Toofan	Togo	Tere Tere
Best Artist or Group in African RnB and Soul	Ali Kiba	Tanzania	Aje ft MI
Best Artist or Group in African Hip-Hop	YCEE	Nigeria	Juice
Best Artist or Group in African Reggae, Ragga and Dancehall	2Baba Idibia	Nigeria	Holy Holy
Best Artist or Group in African Electro	Nsoki	Angola	Africa Unite ft DJ Maphorisa and Paulo Alves
Best Artist in African Jazz	Nduduzo Mhakatini	South Africa	Igagu
Best Artist in African Rock	Gilad	Kenya	Angel Uriel
Best African Collaboration	Ali Kiba ft MI	Tanzania	Aje
Best African Group	Toofan	Togo	Tere Tere
Most Promising Artist in Africa	Neza	Rwanda	Uranyica
Best Artist or Group in African Contemporary	Wande Coal	Nigeria	Iskaba
Best Female Artist in Inspirational Music	Asikey	Nigeria	Earth Attack
Best Male Artist in Inspirational	Gilad	Kenya	Angel Uriel ft Omer Millo
Best Female Artist in Western Africa	Tiwa Savage	Nigeria	All Over
Best Male Artist in Western Africa	Wizkid	Nigeria	Come Closer ft Drake
Best Male Artist in Southern Africa	Emtee	South Africa	We Up
Best Female in Southern Africa	Thandiswa	South Africa	Nonsokolo
Best Male Artist in Northern Africa	Shayfeen	Morocco	Wach Kayn Maydar
Best Female Artist in Northern Africa	Ibitssam Tiskat	Morocco	Menak Wla Meni
Best Male Artist in Eastern Africa	Eddy Kenzo	Uganda	Fikir Yishala
Best Female Artist in East Africa	Nandy	Tanzania	One Day
Best Male Artist in Central Africa	Locko	Cameroon	Supporte Ft Mr Leo
Best Female Artist in Central Africa	Montess	Cameroon	In Love With a Gun Man

=== 2018 edition ===
Category	Winner	Country	Title
Best Female Artist in Central Africa	Daphne	Cameroon	Jusqu’à La Gare
Best Female Artist of the year	Yemi Alade	Nigeria	Herself
Best Male Artist in Central Africa	Fally Ipupa	Congo	Mannequin Ft Keback and Naz
Best Female Artist in Eastern Africa	Betty G	Ethiopia	Mengedegna
Best Male Artist in Eastern Africa	Bebe Cool	Uganda	Freedom
Best Female Artist in Northern Africa	Lyna Mayhem	Algeria	Bye Bye
Best Male Artist in Northern Africa	Hamza El Fadly	Morocco	Ya Mraya
Best Female Artist in Southern Africa	Shekhinah	South Africa	Please Mr
Best Male Artist in Southern Africa	Nasty C	South Africa	Jungle
Best Female Artist in Western Africa	Tiwa Savage	Nigeria	Ma Lo ft Wizkid and Spellz
Best Male Artise in Western Africa	Davido	Nigeria	Fia
Album of the Year	Betty G	Ethiopia	Wegegta
Artist of the Year	Davido	Nigeria	Fia
Best African Video	Sesan Ogunro	Nigeria	Gringo (Shatta Wale)
Best African Act in Diaspora	Hazel Mak	Malawi	Jaiva Ft. Roberto and Tay Grin
Best African Collaboration	GuiltyBeatz, Mr Eazi, Patapaa and Pappy Kojo	Ghana-Nigeria	Akwaaba
Best Artist, Duo or Group in African Contemporary	Kidi	Ghana	Odo Remix Ft. Mayorkun and Davido
Best Artist, Duo or Group in African Dance or Choreography	Mr P	Nigeria	Ebeano
Best African DJ	Afrotronix	Chad	OyO
Best Artist, Duo or Group in African Electro	Master KG	South Africa	Skeleton Move Ft. Zanda Zakuza
Best African Duo, Group or Band	Toofan	Togo	Money
Best Artist, Duo or Group in African Hip Hop	M.anifest Ft. King Promise	Ghana	Me Ne Woa
Best Artist, Duo or Group in African Jazz	Sibusiso Mashiloane	South Africa	Niza
Best Artist, Duo or Group in African Pop	2Baba	Nigeria	Amaka Ft. Peruzzi
Best Artist, Duo or Group in African Ragga, Reggae and Dancehall	Stonebwoy	Ghana	Hero
Best Artist, Duo or Group in African RnB and Soul	Praiz	Nigeria	Champagne and Flowers
Best African Rapper or Lyricist	Falz	Nigeria	La Fête
Best Artiste, Duo or Group in African Traditional	Irene Namatovu	Uganda	Nsambila Nyuma Nga Janzi
Best Artist, Duo or Group in African Rock	Maryam Saleh, Maurice Louca, Tamer Abu Ghazaleh	Egypt	Ekaa Maksour
Best Female Artist in African Inspirational Music	Sandra Nankoma	Uganda	Kaddugala
Best Male Artist in African Inspirational Music	Sarkodie	Ghana	Glory Ft. Yung
Most Promising Artist in Africa	Kuami Eugene	Ghana	Confusion
Producer of the Year	Fresh VDM	Togo	Fia
Revelation of the Year	Betty G	Ethiopia	Ere Manew
Song of the Year	GuiltyBeatz, Mr Eazi, Patapaa and Pappy Kojo	Ghana - Nigeria	Akwaaba
Songwriter of the Year	Shekhinah Donell, Amon Taulo Chibiya II	South Africa	Different Ft. Mariechan
African Fans’ Favourite	Nedy Music	Tanzania	One and Only Ft. Ruby
