= Lindsey Abudei =

Nigerian singer (born 1987)

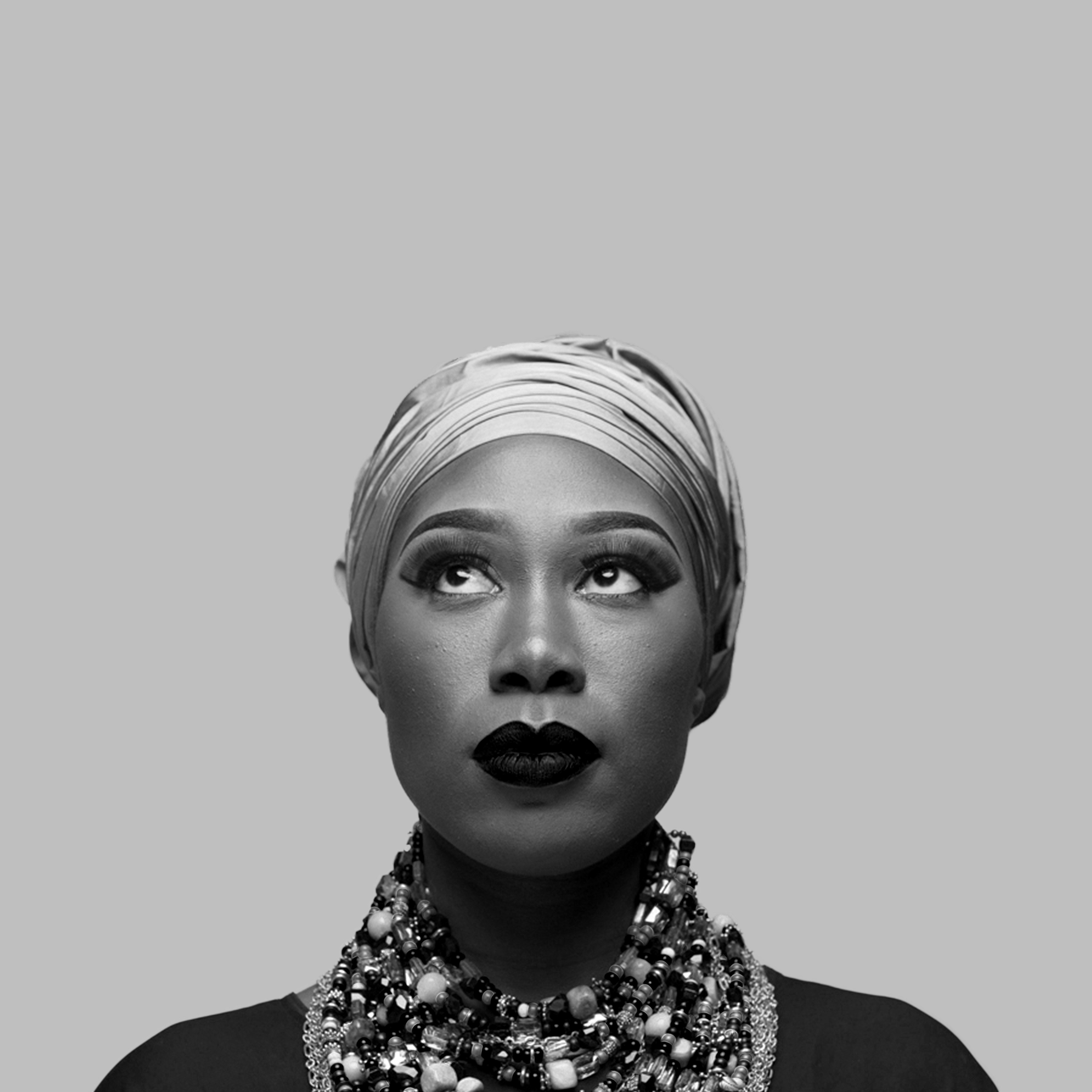
- Lindsey Abudei

Background information
- Born: Lindsey Chukwufumnanya Abudei; 6 February 1987 (age 39); Jos, Plateau State, Nigeria
- Genres: Neo-soul, alternative R&B
- Occupations: Singer; songwriter
- Instrument: Vocals
- Years active: 2011–present
- Website: lindseyabudei.com

Lindsey Chukwufumnanya Abudei (born 6 February 1987), known professionally as Lindsey Abudei, is a Nigerian singer and songwriter. In 2010, she recorded music and had jam sessions with rappers M.I Abaga and Jesse Jagz while studying law at the University of Jos. Abudei has released the solo projects Brown (2013), ...and the Bass Is Queen (2016), and Kaleidoscope (2023).

== Early life and education ==
A native of the Igbo-speaking part of Delta State, Abudei was born and raised in Jos. She attained a law degree from the University of Jos and decided to pursue a career in music after graduating. Abudei's parents were involved in music during their early years. She chose to make neo-soul and R&B music after listening to artists such as Stevie Wonder, Roberta Flack, Sade, Prince, Nat King Cole, R.E.M., Skeeter Davis, Andy Williams, The Beach Boys and Omar Lye-Fook.

== Career ==
=== 2004–10: Early beginnings and Project Fame West Africa ===
In 2010, Abudei started recording music with MI, Jesse Jagz and Ruby Gyang while still an undergraduate law student at the University of Jos. That same year, she auditioned for the third season of Project Fame West Africa. Although she exited the platform as an early evictee, she managed to attract a devoted fanbase. Abudei had a brief stint with the Jazzcats, a jazz band. She lent vocals to M.I's "Jehovah", a track from his debut studio album Talk About It (2008). Moreover, she was featured on DJinee's "Thank You" and Jesse Jagz's "This Jagged Life".

=== 2011–present: Brown, ...and the Bass Is Queen, and Kaleidoscope ===
Abudei's debut extended play (EP), Brown, was independently released on 24 February 2013. It comprises eight tracks and includes cover versions of Aṣa's "Jailer" and Fela Kuti's "Trouble Sleep, Yanga Go Wake Am". The EP was produced by Atta Lenell, Jesse Jagz, and IBK. It was supported by the previously released singles "Drift Away", "The 90s Song", and "Out the Magazine".

Abudei started recording her debut studio album, ...and the Bass Is Queen, in 2014. She filmed the music video for "Out the Magazine" with Kemi Adetiba in 2015. On 25 June 2016, she disclosed that the album would comprise twelfth tracks and unveiled its cover art. In 2017, Abudei announced a concert residency in New York and became an Art OMI Music Fellow. She recorded "Abụ Ya", an acoustic ballad that initially appeared on Brymo's seventh studio album Yellow (2020). The song was excluded from the track list when Yellow was reinstated on streaming services; "Abụ Ya" later appeared on her second extended play Kaleidoscope. On 3 April 2020, Abudei released the alternative ballad "One on the Outside", which marked her first solo release in three years. The song was originally slated to appear on Kaleidoscope.

Kaleidoscope's release coincided with Abudei's thirty-six birthday on 6 February 2023. The EP is a mixture of electronic and classical music, and was jointly produced by Abudei and Bigfoot. All of the songs on Kaleidoscope include an intermission and were written by Abudei while she was experiencing loss and uncertainty. Kaleidoscope was written as a soundscape for visual and performance presentations.

== Artistry and influences ==
Abudei's music is a mixture of neo soul and alternative music. She has cited Stevie Wonder, Norah Jones, Sade, Eva Cassidy, and Roberta Flack as her key musical influences.

== Discography ==
- Brown (2013)
- ...and the Bass Is Queen (2016)
- Kaleidoscope (2023)
