= Music Has No Boundaries =

Music Has No Boundaries (MHNB)

Studio album by Ahmed Soultan
- Released: 23 January 2016
- Genre: Afrobian (Afro-Arabian Soul)
- Length: 69:31
- Language: English, Moroccan Arabic, Amazigh, French
- Label: Somum
- Producer: Ahmed Soultan

Ahmed Soultan chronology
Code (2009)	Music Has No Boundaries (MHNB) (2016)

Music Has No Boundaries, also known as MHNB, is the third studio album by Moroccan singer-songwriter Ahmed Soultan, released on 23 January 2016 by Somum Records. The album marks Soultan's return after 7 years since his last album Code released in 2009.

Ahmed Soultan collaborated with many artists on the album, including George Clinton, Femi Kuti, Fred Wesley, Pee Wee Ellis and RZA.

== Release ==
Ahmed Soultan intends to make the album available in 60 stores, Music Has No Boundaries was released in Morocco on 23 January 2016 at all Virgin Megastores across the country, and on 30 January 2016 in Carrefour Market stores. Album signing events were held in Virgin Megastores to promote the album.

== Track listing ==
All lyrics are written by Ahmed Soultan.

No.	Title	Length
1.	"Afrobian" (feat. Femi Kuti, Fred Wesley, Pee Wee Ellis, Mehdi Nassouli (Radio Edit))	3:54
2.	"Ana O Rassi"	3:18
3.	"MHNB" (feat. George Clinton (Music Has No Boundaries))	4:23
4.	"Binatna"	4:21
5.	"Wrong About Me" (feat. Tekitha)	3:30
6.	"Champion"	2:51
7.	"This Is Who I Am" (feat. Wiyaala)	3:39
8.	"Warda/Rose"	3:28
9.	"Dwa Diali" (feat. Samira)	2:37
10.	"Feel My Life"	5:38
11.	"El Walidin"	3:40
12.	"My Mood"	3:56
13.	"Wonder feat. Akala"	4:48
14.	"Afrobian" (feat. Femi Kuti, Fred Wesley, Pee Wee Ellis, Mehdi Nassouli (Extended))	8:43
15.	"Nti O Ana" (feat. Samira (Rhimou Bonus))	3:40
16.	"Bent Nass" ((Rhimou Bonus))	3:32
17.	"My Jailer" ((Bonus))	3:34
Total length:		69:31
