= Libel (EP) =

EP by Brymo
- Released: November 5, 2020
- Genre: Lo-fi; soft rock; quiet storm
- Length: 16:46
- Label: Independent
- Producer: Bigfoot

Brymo chronology
Yellow (2020)	Libel (2020)	9: Èsan (2021)

Singles from Libel
- 1. "Messiah Complexes"

Libel is the debut extended play by Nigerian singer Brymo, independently released on November 5, 2020. A follow-up to his seventh studio album Yellow, the EP comprises five tracks and features guest vocals by Deborah Prest. All of the songs on Libel were produced and mastered entirely by Bigfoot. The lyrics address the rape accusation leveled against Brymo by a woman on social media. Libel was supported by the single "Messiah Complexes".

== Background ==
A few weeks after releasing his seventh studio album, Yellow, a woman on Twitter accused Brymo of raping her. He denied the accusation and implied that an inquiry was still in progress. He also made reference to the accusation on Libel and believed the woman's actions were libelous. Brymo wrote all of the songs on the EP and recruited Bigfoot to produce and master the entire project. Designed by Adey Omotade, the cover art features a pair of women's panties, blood, and a broken glass. Libel comprises five tracks and features guest vocals by Deborah Prest.

== Composition ==
Libel is a lo-fi record that explores musical styles such as soft rock and quiet storm. On the opening track "Ascendancy", Brymo discusses depression, pain, and musical succor. Pulse Nigeria's Motolani Alake said the singer was "broken and reeling from pain" as exemplified by lyrics like "So I sing, sing, sing, drown all my pain in the sound. So I breathe, breathe, breathe, the rhythm comes flowing through me". In "Love and Paradoxes", Brymo sings about love and dedicated the record to his wife who helped him overcome the rape accusations. Alake likened the piano chords used in the song's opening sequence to Lana Del Rey's music.

The third track, "Messiah Complexes", is a departure from the "pensive, slow-paced beat" of the first two tracks. On the record, Brymo instructs himself to take a moment to reflect and be grateful for his blessings. In the sentimental ballad "Phoenix", Brymo is worryingly defiant but rises like the phoenix. "Time", the closing track, features vocals by Prest and discusses loneliness, worries, and the futile passage of time.

== Critical reception ==
Libel received positive reviews from music critics. In a review for YNaija, Kola Muhammed characterized the EP as a "musical diary bearing tales of anguish" and said Brymo "sought to heal himself from the pain of defamation". Pulse Nigeria's Motolani Alake awarded the EP an 8.2 rating out of 10, acknowledging it for being "largely about Brymo's journey back to life, as aided by love".

== Track listing ==
All tracks are written by Ọlawale Ọlọfọrọ and produced by Bigfoot.

No.	Title	Length
1.	"Ascendency"	2:58
2.	"Love and Paradoxes"	3:08
3.	"Messiah Complexes"	3:18
4.	"The Phoenix"	3:12
5.	"Time" (featuring Deborah Prest)	4:09
Total length:		16:46

== Personnel ==
- Ọlawale Ọlọfọrọ – primary artist, writer, performer
- Bigfoot – mixing, production (all tracks)

== Release history ==
Release formats for Libel
Region	Date	Format	Label	Ref
Various	November 5, 2020	Digital download	Independent	
