= Oṣó =

Studio album by Brymo
- Released: March 27, 2018
- Genres: Alternative folk; Yoruba music
- Length: 38:00
- Languages: English; Nigerian Pidgin; Yoruba
- Label: Independent
- Producer: Mikky Me Joses

Brymo chronology
Klĭtôrĭs (2016)	Oṣó (2018)	A.A.A (2019)

Singles from Oṣó
- 1. "Heya!" Released: March 28, 2018; 2. "Bá’núsọ" Released: September 9, 2018

Oṣó (Yoruba: The Wizard) is the sixth studio album by Nigerian singer Brymo. It was released independently on 27 March 2018. The album was produced entirely by Mikky Me Joses and consists of 11 tracks, including three recorded in the Yoruba language. Oṣó is a mixture of Alternative folk and Yoruba music and has elements of mysticism; it sheds light on Brymo's folk and traditional roots. Oṣó was supported by the singles "Heya!" and "Bá’núsọ". It received critical acclaim from music critics, who complimented its production and Brymo's songwriting. The website Pulse Nigeria and Nigerian Entertainment Today ranked Oṣó second on their list of the best Nigerian albums of 2018.

== Background and promotion ==
In November 2017, Brymo announced on Twitter that plans were underway for the album. He disclosed its title was Oṣó (Yoruba: The Wizard) and launched a website theosoproject.com dedicated to the project. He also said the album would exclude Afrobeat and instead draw inspiration from Apala and Yoruba folk music. Brymo said the album's entire production incorporated the use of live instrumentation. In an interview with Joey Akan, Brymo said Oṣó was darker than anything he has ever made. On 14 March 2018, Brymo unveiled the album's track list on Instagram. The post revealed the album was mastered at Metalworks Studios in Canada.

Oṣó is a mixture of alternative folk and Yoruba music. It has elements of mysticism and sheds light on Brymo's folk and traditional roots. Oṣó was produced and mixed entirely by his frequent collaborator Mikky Me Joses. The album's cover was designed by Lemi Ghariokwu, an artist who has illustrated 26 album covers for Fela Kuti. The cover features a black cat, one of Africa's most revered mascots of black magic.

The album's lead single, "Heya!", was released on 28 March 2018, along with its music video. Sahara Reporters ranked "Heya!" seventh on their list of the 10 Most Popular Songs of 2018. However, in a review for the website Music in Africa, music critic Oris Aigbokhaevbolo said the lyrics of "Heya!" are not worth the singer's striptease. The accompanying music video for "Heya!" was released on 28 March. Filmed and directed by NVMB3R Production, the video features Brymo exposing his buttocks while wearing a loincloth to hide his genitals. The video received mixed reviews; those in support of it described it as a moment of brilliance, while those in opposition see it as Brymo's attempt to draw attention to himself. In an email to Pulse Nigeria, Brymo defended his decision to expose his buttocks, saying, "I decided to appear how my forebears dressed before the arrival of civilization to Nubian continent." Pulse Nigeria ranked the video fourth on their list of the top 10 Nigerian Music Videos for the year.

The album's second single, "Bá’núsọ" (Yoruba: "Follow Up"), was released on 9 September 2018, along with its music video. The media company More Branches ranked "Bá’núsọ" first on their list of the 50 songs they rocked in the first half of 2018. The music video for the song was filmed by Victor Adewale and edited by Samuel Obadina. It features Brymo conveying weighty messages in a dark-themed room. Reviewing for Music in Africa, Aigbokhaevbo described the video as "Brymo’s self-love refracted through Adewale’s lens" and also noted the video is "fitting for a song about the value of introspection and the importance of keeping your own counsel".

== Composition ==
Oṣó opens with "No Be Me", a song that reminds listeners of their humanity and subjection to their environment; Brymo is heard singing over soothing strings and snares. In the acoustic interlude "Mama", Brymo questions his ability to go further than he has, how nothing in the world has changed since his mother bore him and how unfair life is. "Heya!" is accompanied by a piano and is a nod to the complexity and multitude of human experiences. The optimistic song "Patience and Goodluck" has been described as having a "comforting underlying message" exemplified by lyrics like "if you wait, you go soon find out say good time go come again". The track contains somber percussion, violins and other orchestra-esque harmonies. The self-loving track "God is in Your Mind" combines Brymo's vocals with a guitar riff by David Ubani; the song urges listeners to look inward and appreciate God's presence in them.

In "Time is so Kind", Brymo's vocals are accompanied by a combination of electric guitar harmonies, horns and drums; he philosophizes about time and life and urges listeners to feel exactly what they are feeling. The love ballad "Entropy" features an intense but gentle mix of percussion and strings. The track "Money Launderers and Heartbreakers" is reminiscent of 9ice's "Living Things". The nostalgic track "Ọlánrewájú" borrows from the tradition of Yoruba storytelling. The Jùjú-inspired track "Olúmọ" combines the talking drum with a saxophone and folklore instrumentals; the song is a tribute to Nigerian playwright Wole Soyinka. In "Bá’núsọ", Brymo continues to offer pseudo-intellectual advice.

== Critical reception ==
Professional ratings
Review scores
Source	Rating
Nigerian Entertainment Today	4.5/5 stars
Pulse Nigeria	4.5/5 stars
TooXclusive	4.1/5 stars

Oṣó received positive critical acclaim from music critics. Reviewing for Ventures Africa, writer David Adeleke praised the singer's approach to songwriting and the richness of his sound; Adeleke described the instrumentation on the album as "classy" and "expansive". Nigerian Entertainment Today's Sandra Ezekwesili granted the album a 4.5/5 rating, describing it as "an introspective journey through love and life and the myriad of relationships in between". In a review for Music in Africa, Adams Adeosun said Oṣó "shows an upswing in the conversation between Brymo and music" and further stated that the listener "becomes an intruder to an exchange between one man and his god". A Pulse Nigeria contributor, who goes by Jonathan, awarded Oṣó 4.5/5 stars and praised Brymo for creating an environmental project that explores the human condition.

Wilfred Okiche praised the album for its excellent arrangement and production. Okiche also notes the album is not completely self-absorbed and has all the strengths and weaknesses of Brymo. The Native's Debola Abimbolu wrote that "Brymo stays true to folk music’s evergreen topics of wanderlust, love and search for nirvana—he tackles them with a graceful economy of language and fine gradients of emotions." TooXclusive's Daniel Enisan rated the album 4.1 stars out of 5, praising Brymo's songwriting skills and describing Oṣó as a "masterpiece that will grow into a classic". Afro 100 Media stated that the album embodies profound lyricism, relative sound and instrumental music in tune with its overall message. In a review for the Daily Trust newspaper, Abdulkareem Aminu praised Brymo's overall growth and opined that Oṣó is the "best album released this year so far".

=== Accolades ===
Pulse Nigeria and Nigerian Entertainment Today ranked Oṣó second on their list of the best Nigerian albums of 2018.

Year	Awards ceremony	Award description(s)	Recipient	Results	Ref
2019	The Headies	Best Recording of the Year	"Ọlánrewájú"	Nominated	
2019	The Headies	Best Alternative Song	"Heya!"	Nominated	
2019	The Headies	Best Performer	Himself	Nominated	

== Track listing ==
All tracks are written by Ọlawale Ọlọfọrọ and produced by Mikky Me Joses.

No.	Title	Length
1.	"No Be Me"	3:12
2.	"Mama"	1:07
3.	"Heya!"	3:30
4.	"Patience and Goodluck"	3:11
5.	"God is in Your Mind"	4:46
6.	"Time is so Kind"	5:22
7.	"Entropy"	3:55
8.	"Money Launderers and Heart Breakers"	3:46
9.	"Ọlánrewájú"	3:25
10.	"Olúmọ"	2:25
11.	"Bá'núsọ"	3:23
Total length:		38:00

== Credits and personnel ==
Credits adapted from the album's back cover.

- Ọlawale Ọlọfọrọ – primary artist, writer
- Mikky Me Joses – mixing, production (all tracks)
- Chris Crerar at Metalworks Studios – mastering (all tracks)
- The Bail Entertainment Company – management
- Clockwyce Distributions – marketing and distribution

== Release history ==
Region	Date	Format	Label	Ref.
Various	March 27, 2018	CD, Digital download	Independent	
