= Tabula Rasa (Brymo album) =

Studio album by Brymo
- Released: October 30, 2014
- Recorded: 2014
- Genre: Afrobeat; afro-soul
- Length: 38:00
- Language: English; Nigerian Pidgin; Yoruba
- Label: Independent
- Producer: Mikky Me Joses

Brymo chronology
Merchants, Dealers & Slaves (2013)	Tabula Rasa (2014)	Trance (2015)

Singles from Tabula Rasa
- 1. "Fe Mi" Released: September 18, 2014; 2. "1 Pound" Released: March 06, 2015; 3. "Ję Lé O Sinmi" Released: March 30, 2015

Tabula Rasa (Latin: Blank Slate) is the fourth studio album by Nigerian singer Brymo, independently released on October 30, 2014. A follow-up to Merchants, Dealers & Slaves, the album is Brymo's second full-length release since the Federal High Court of Lagos lifted Chocolate City's injunction against him. Tabula Rasa's lyrical content explores the recurring theme of freedom. The album was supported by the singles "Fe Mi", "1 Pound", and "Ję Lé O Sinmi". Critical reception to Tabula Rasa was overwhelmingly positive, with several music critics calling it "a masterpiece".

== Background and promotion ==
Brymo started recording Tabula Rasa after releasing his third studio album, Merchants, Dealers & Slaves (2013). Sammy Sage Hasson was originally announced as the only artist that would be featured on the album. Brymo's former manager, Lanre Lawal, told The Punch that Brymo was working on an album for 2014. Brymo decided to name the album Tabula Rasa after hearing the judge use the term in a speech.

"Fe Mi" was released as the album's lead single on September 18, 2014. Ayo Onikoyi of Vanguard described the song as "a soft traditional ballad". The album's second single, "1 Pound", was released on March 6, 2015, along with its documentary-style music video. Brymo premiered the video on Pulse Nigeria and said the song informs people about local and international currencies. On March 30, 2015, he released the Godson KC Uma-directed music video for the album's third single "Ję Lé O Sinmi".

== Composition ==
On the album's opener "Back to Love", Brymo expresses himself spiritually, emotionally and creatively. In "Fe Mi", he pleads for physical love; the song features a guitar riff and rhythmic claps. The song "Prick No Get Shoulder" portrays a state of being and serves as a metaphor for taking caution when enjoying life's pleasures. Music critic Michael Kolawole praised Brymo for "weaving and juxtaposing long-winded cautious narratives about self-responsibility" on the track. In "Dear Child", Brymo narrates the fickleness of life and the unconditional love between a grandmother and her grandchild. In "Ję Lé O Sinmi" (Yoruba: Kindergarten), he recounts his journey from a young, naive child in daycare to an adult.

"Alone" is a spoken word track about discovering one's self. "Never Look Back" is a compelling charge to owning up and taking responsibility. In "Jungle Fever", Brymo sings about the unrest of the populace; the latter part of the song is a metaphor for being angry at the status quo. "1 Pound" is an Afrobeat song with trademark horns and meandering guitar licks. "Again" is a song about starting love all over again; it is composed of grand drums and a choir-like hum.

== Critical reception ==
Professional ratings
Review scores
Source	Rating
NotJustOk	10/10
Jaguda	9/10
Pulse Nigeria	4.5/5 stars
TooXclusive	4.5/5 stars

Tabula Rasa received positive critical acclaim from music critics. Tola Sarumi of NotJustOk gave the album a perfect rating of 10/10, calling it "an instant classic" and commending the production for matching Brymo's delivery. Jim Donnett granted the album 4.5 stars out of 5, describing it as a "brilliant compositional effort made to evoke one's senses." Ayomide Tayo of Pulse Nigeria awarded the album 4.5 stars out of 5, praising its quality, production and sound.

A writer for TayoTV, who goes by the moniker OluwaSparkle, characterized the album as "a masterpiece" and said Brymo "can be counted among the true vocalists of our time". The duo at Should You Bump This called Tabula Rasa "a masterpiece" and acknowledged it for being a "must have for music lovers worldwide". The duo also considers Brymo to be "hands down the best male artiste in Nigeria." A writer for the music blog Jaguda awarded the album a score of 9 out of 10, describing it as "a genuine gift to all lovers of good music."

== Track listing ==
All tracks are written by Olawale Ashimi and produced by Mikky Me Joses.

No.	Title	Length
1.	"Back to Love"	3:42
2.	"Fe Mi"	3:25
3.	"Prick No Get Shoulder"	3:30
4.	"Dear Child"	3:32
5.	"Ję Lé O Sinmi"	3:10
6.	"Never Look Back"	3:21
7.	"Alone"	3:01
8.	"Jungle Fever"	3:14
9.	"1 Pound"	3:34
10.	"Nothing's Ever Promised Tomorrow..."	3:01
11.	"Again"	3:45
Total length:		38:00

== Release history ==
Region	Date	Version	Format
Various	October 30, 2014	Standard	CD; digital download
