= Nedy Music =

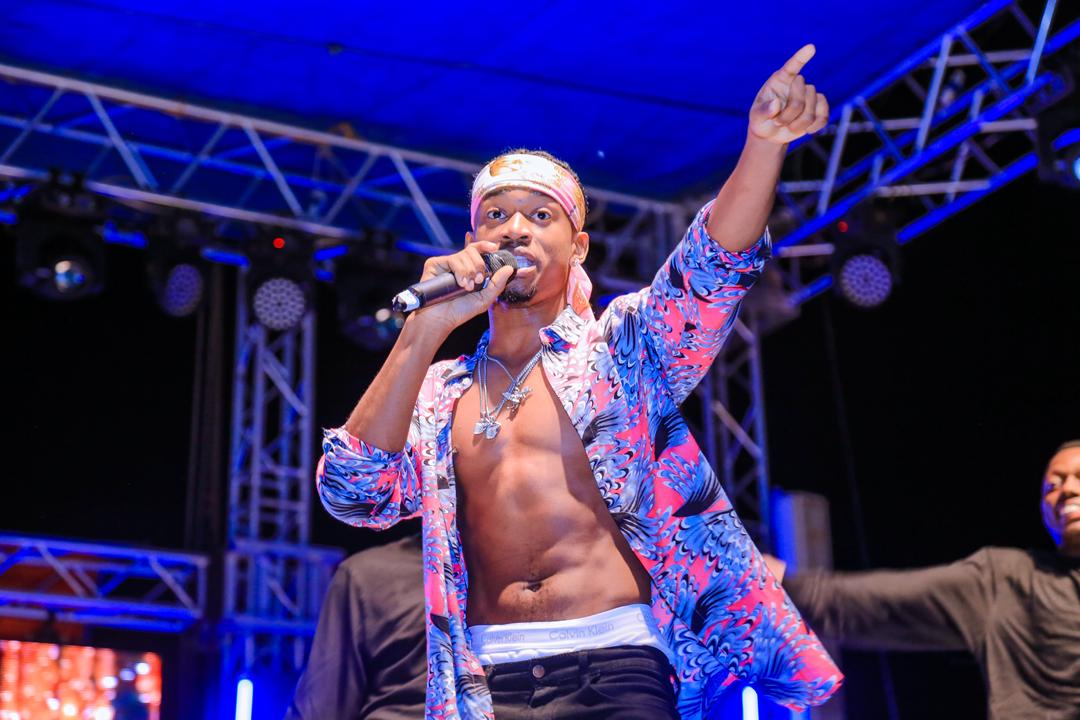

Background information
- Born: Said Seif Ali; February 24, 1995 (age 31); Zanzibar, Tanzania
- Genres: Afro pop; Bongo Flava; Zouk
- Occupations: Singer; songwriter
- Years active: 2012–present
- Label: Fine Boy Music

Said Seif Ally (born February 24, 1995) popularly known as Nedy Music, is an Afropop, Zouk and Bongo Flava music singer and songwriter from Tanzania. He is known for his single "Usiende Mbali". Nedy was nominated on Afrima Awards in 2018 and won on a category of "African Fans favourite".

== Early life and career ==
Before becoming a singer, he was mainly known as a dancer, and per-took his dance career in various talent competition both in his local town and nationwide. In 2010 alongside his group, he participated in Dance La Fiesta and emerged the winners of the competition. In 2011, he participated in "Dance Mia Mia" competition but failed to reach the finals.

During his music career Nedy meet with Rashid, who also wrote his first song and took him to the studio. His first track was "Goi Goi" back in 2012, but the track never really panned out to be a success. Then he released "Nijalie", which was Nedy's first experience in the song-writing and breakthrough for his music career.

Upon completion of High School in 2013, Nedy joined the Tanzania House of Talent (THT) and studied for a year and graduated. In 2014, he dropped "Nenda Salama", followed by "Dayana" in 2015 and that's when he gained interest of PKP Entertainment Music Label which is owned by other musician named Ommy Dimpoz. His first song under the label was "UsiendeMbali" which features Ommy Dimpoz, and the song skyrocketed him into stardom. The song topped several charts locally and internationally, including networks such as MTVbase, Sound City and Trace Urban.

Shortly after, he dropped another hit, "Rudi" this time teaming up with the crooner, Christian Bella. As did his previous track, Rudi was an instant hit, and Nedy's career leapfrogged into new heights.

== Discography ==
=== Singles ===
- Nijalie (2013)
- Nenda Salama (2013)
- Dayana (2014)
- Usiende Mbali [Feat. Ommy Dimpoz] (2016)
- Rudi [Feat. Christian Bella](2016)
- Dozee (2017)
- Nishalewa [Feat. Mr Blue] (2017)
- One And Only [Feat. Ruby] (2018)
- Homa La Jiji (2018)
- Zungusha (2018)
- Mi Nawe (2019)
- Carino [Feat. Singah] (2019)

== Awards and nominations ==
Year	Award Ceremony	Prize	Work/Recipient	Result
2019	Starqt Awards	Best Newcomer artist of year	Nedy	Nominated
2018	Afrima Awards	Best African Fans Favourite	"One And Only" by Nedy Feat. Ruby	Won
2016	Abryanz Fashion Awards	Best Male Stylish	Nedy	Nominated
