= Brymo =

Nigerian singer (born 1986)

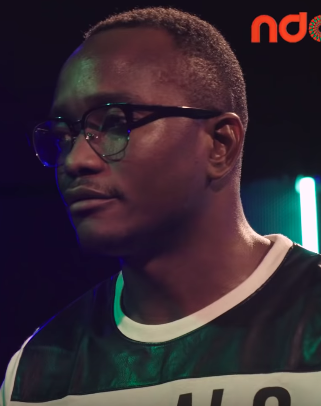
- Brymo performing "Let Us Be Great" for Ndani Sessions in November 2018
- Born: Olawale Ashimi; 9 May 1986 (age 40); Okokomaiko, Ojo, Lagos State, Nigeria
- Education: Lagos State University
- Occupations: Singer; songwriter; sonic artist; author; actor
- Years active: 1999–present
- Spouse: Esse Kakada
- Children: 1
- Musical career
- Genres: Yoruba music; alt-rock; R&B; afro-soul; folk; pop; afrobeat
- Instruments: Vocals; keyboard
- Label: Independent
- Formerly of: The Aliens
- Website: sigmasonic.art

Ọlawale Ọlọfọrọ (born Olawale Ibrahim Ashimi; 9 May 1986), better known as Brymo, is a Nigerian singer, songwriter, sonic artist, actor and author. Born and raised in Okokomaiko, he started recording music in 1999 while in secondary school. Brymo's debut album, Brymstone (2007), was supported by the single "Shawty". He signed a recording contract with music label Chocolate City in 2010, but was accused of breaching his contract nearly three years later. Brymo's second studio album, The Son of a Kapenta, was released in 2012 and yielded the singles "Ara", "Good Morning", and "Go Hard".

Following his controversial exit from Chocolate City in 2013, Brymo abandoned his career as a mainstream artist and embraced Nigeria's alternative music space. Between 2013 and 2018, he released four critically acclaimed albums: Merchants, Dealers & Slaves (2013), Tabula Rasa (2014), Klĭtôrĭs (2016) and Oṣó (2018). Music critics lauded Merchants, Dealers & Slaves and Tabula Rasa as "masterpieces". Brymo teamed up with three members of Skata Vibration to form A.A.A, an alternative rock band whose eponymous debut Extended Play (EP) was released in August 2019. In 2020, he released the hedonistic album Yellow and the five-track EP Libel. The former is a departure from the dark themes of his sixth studio album, Oṣó, while the latter addressed the rape allegations that surfaced on Twitter that year.

In September 2021, Brymo released the bipartite albums 9: Èsan and 9: Harmattan & Winter. Both projects include folk ballads and explore musical styles such as fusion-rock and alternative folk. His tenth studio album, Theta (2022), was recorded entirely in Nigerian Pidgin. Brymo rebranded himself as a sonic artist in 2022, and has released the sonic albums Mansa (2023) and Petrichor (2025). His twelfth studio album, Macabre (2023), comprises fourteen tracks and was described by the singer as a "reggae album sung in English". Brymo has released books Oriri's Plight (2018), Verses (2020) and The Bad Tooth (2022), and starred in the films Price of Admission (2021) and Elesin Oba, The King's Horseman (2022).

== Life and career ==
=== Early life and career beginnings ===
Olawale Ashimi was born on 9 May 1986, in Okokomaiko, Ojo, Lagos State, Nigeria. His father is an Awori carpenter and his mother is an Egun petty trader; he is his parents' only child. Ashimi grew up in a multi-faith household and learned to recite the entire Qur'an after being enrolled into an Islamic School. He attended Aganju Aka Primary School and later enrolled at Japual Primary School. Ashimi was initially interested in pursuing a career in football after graduating from secondary school. In 1999, while in secondary school, Ashimi recorded his first song and titled it "Future". In 2002, he and some of his friends formed a group called The Aliens; they were active between 2004 and 2005, and disbanded in 2005. Ashimi was inspired to create music after listening to his mother singing fuji songs. He gained admission to Lagos State University (LASU), where he studied zoology, but after his second year he left to pursue a career in music.

=== 2007–2012: Brymstone, "Oleku" collaboration, and The Son of a Kapenta ===
Brymo released his debut studio album, Brymstone, in 2007; its lead single "Shawty" was accompanied by a music video. He told Damiete Braide of The Sun, he chose Rhythm and Blues (R&B) after being influenced by the work of R. Kelly and the Backstreet Boys. He also told Braide he sold more than 2,000 copies of the album within six months of its release. In a 2013 interview with The Sun, Brymo said management problems prevented him from getting a marketing deal for the album and that he had a one-million naira offer that failed because of technical issues. Brymo also said Brymstone is his worst body of work but credits it with helping him enter the music business.

Brymo appeared on the hit single "Oleku", which was released as the lead single from Ice Prince's debut studio album, Everybody Loves Ice Prince (2011). Brymo's inspiration for recording the hook of "Oleku" came from the passion and energy around him, and from hunger and desperation. He also said the song did not generate money but gave him exposure. In 2010, Denrele Edun, whom Brymo met a few years earlier, asked Brymo if he knew the rapper M.I, who was interested in talking with him. In 2010, Brymo signed to the label Chocolate City after talking with M.I. Prior to his record deal with Chocolate City, Brymo worked with rapper Jesse Jagz on the song "Love You", which appeared on Jagz's debut studio album, Jag of All Tradez (2011).

On 15 November 2012, Brymo released his second studio album The Son of a Kapenta, which includes guest appearances from Jesse Jagz, Pryse, M.I, Ice Prince and Efya. The album was recorded in English and Yoruba. On 18 September 2011, Brymo released the Legendury Beatz-produced track "Ara" as the album's lead single. Aje Filmworks directed its music video, which was released on 31 December 2011. "Ara" is a slang word that loosely translates to "wonder". In a July 2012 interview with Adeola Adeyemo of BellaNaija, Brymo said he recorded the song while being under pressure from Chocolate City to submit a single. He also said "Ara" was written six months after he recorded "Good Morning".

On 16 April 2012, Brymo released "Good Morning" as the album's second single. Its music video was directed by Aje Filmworks and released on 30 July 2012. In a 2012 interview with newspaper The Punch, Brymo said his father's carpentry profession inspired the album's title, described The Son of a Kapenta as a summary of his life and said each song is a reflection of his energy. Brymo also said he recorded the album to be identified by his body of work as a lead artist rather than as a featured artist. In January 2013, newspaper The Nation included The Son of a Kapenta on its list of Albums that failed commercially in 2012".

=== 2013–2015: Merchants, Dealers & Slaves, Tabula Rasa and Trance ===
On 20 October 2013, Brymo released his third studio album Merchants, Dealers & Slaves, which was produced by Mikky Me and includes guitar work from David. Hard copies of the album were released on 26 March 2014. On 18 October 2013, Brymo revealed the album's track list on Instagram. The album's lead single "Down" was released on 1 October 2013, the day after its music video had been uploaded to YouTube. Brymo dedicated the song to his family and country. According to Nigerian Entertainment Today, undergraduate students at Southern Illinois University Carbondale had examined the lyrics of "Down" as part of a case-study project. Brymo was invited to the school to attend the case study presentation. On 21 October 2013, "Eko" was released as the album's second single. Critical reception to Merchants, Dealers & Slaves was positive. Ayomide Tayo of Nigeria Entertainment Today described the album as a "soulful masterpiece that is emotionally charged with amazing production".

On 14 October 2014, Brymo was announced as an ambassador for the Lagos Chamber of Commerce and Industry. He released his fourth studio album, Tabula Rasa, on 30 October 2014; earlier that month, his manager Lanre Lawal announced plans for the release during an interview with The Punch. Lawal told The Sun the album would be a fusion of African folk and popular music. Brymo told The Nation he recorded the album to move on from his controversial split with Chocolate City. He decided to name the album Tabula Rasa after hearing the judge use the term in a speech. "Fe Mi" was released as the album's lead single on 18 September 2014; Ayo Onikoyi of Vanguard described the song as "a soft traditional ballad". On 6 March 2015, Brymo released a documentary about the song "1 Pound" that was directed by St. Immaculate; a teaser of the documentary was released four days earlier. On 30 March 2015, Brymo released the music video for the song "Ję Lé O Sinmi"; Godson KC Uma of MaadKreativity Inc directed the video, which runs for 3 minutes and 59 seconds.

On 3 December 2015, Brymo released "Waka Waka", the theme song to the stage musical Wakaa! The Musical. In an interview with newspaper This Day, Brymo said the project's script inspired the song and that he was interested after Wakaa's production team contacted his management. Brymo also recorded the song "Viva", which later appeared on the 2016 soundtrack album for the musical. On 8 December 2015, Brymo released an eight-track compilation album titled Trance. It was released by American record label and publishing firm Tate Music Group, and was originally scheduled for a September 2015 release. Trance was primarily targeted at audiences in the U.S., and contains songs from the albums Merchants, Dealers & Slaves and Tabula Rasa. Brymo described Trance as a medley of thoughts based on his experiences. The album contains elements of African folk, soul, pop, and afrobeat.

=== Chocolate City departure ===
In May 2013, Brymo announced on Twitter he had left Chocolate City. Audu Maikori, who was CEO of Chocolate City at the time, refuted Brymo's claims during a press conference at the label's office in Lekki. Maikori said Brymo still had three years left on his contract and still needed to record two albums. According to newspaper Vanguard, during the press conference, Maikori said Brymo had committed an act of insubordination when he refused to remove a picture he posted on Instagram. While speaking to journalists in June, Brymo said Chocolate City cheated him when it failed to explain how his second studio album was leaked, and that there was no accountability in the way his album was being sold and distributed.

In August 2013, Brymo signed a distribution deal with digital media company Spinlet, enabling it to distribute his next album online. Spinlet discontinued the deal after Chocolate City made them aware of the label's existing contract with Brymo. On 14 October, Chocolate City filed an interim injunction against Brymo, restraining him from partaking in musical ventures beyond the confines of his contract. Six days later, Brymo released his third studio album despite reports about the injunction. On 21 October, a judge at the Federal High Court of Lagos restrained Brymo from releasing and distributing any musical work pending Chocolate City's lawsuit against him.

According to The Nation, Brymo and his management met with Chocolate City representatives in October 2013 to discuss mutually-agreeable terms. Chocolate City asked Brymo to sign an agreement during the meeting but failed. On 11 November 2013, the legal teams of both parties met in court for a hearing and that the case was adjourned to 5 December. Between December 2013 and March 2014, the case was adjourned four times for several reasons. In March 2014, the Federal High Court of Lagos lifted the restraint it put on Brymo. Two months later, the judge presiding over the case withdrew after he was accused of bias. In a radio interview with Toolz in May 2016, Brymo said he did not win the case against Chocolate City, saying: "we had the opportunity to iron it out in court but they fried it up. I don’t know what they did but they definitely spoke to the judge and spoke to the lawyers and scrapped the case, they are lawyers; they can do it."

=== 2016–2018: Klĭtôrĭs, Oṣó and Oriri's Plight ===
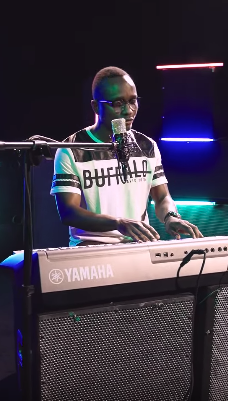
Brymo performing "Let Us Be Great" for Ndani Sessions in November 2018

Brymo's fifth studio album, Klĭtôrĭs, was released on 9 May 2016. It was made available for pre-order via iTunes prior to its release. Eleven tracks comprise the album, whose release was preceded by that of the lead single "Happy Memories". Brymo's wife Esse Kakada, who was his girlfriend at the time of the album's release, is featured on the song "Naked". Georgi Georgiev of Moonring Art Design designed the album's original artwork. Duks created an edited version of the artwork because iTunes refused to use the original artwork. In an interview with Nigerian Entertainment Today, Brymo said the album's title means key in the Greek language and that the album is an expression of love and the uncertainty of it. He said; "the album is the key to a certain door I have knocked on for years; and yes it was meant to be sensual, there ought to be two sides to the coin". Klĭtôrĭs was nominated for Best R&B/Pop Album at The Headies 2016 and for Album of the Year at The Headies 2018.

In November 2017, Brymo said on Twitter plans were underway for his sixth studio album, whose title he announced as Oṣó (Yoruba: The Wizard), and launched a website titled theosoproject.com dedicated to the project. In August 2017, he released the Jazz-infused Afrobeat single "Do You Know Me". Oṣó was released on 27 March 2018; it has 11 tracks, and was produced and mixed by Brymo's frequent collaborator Mikky Me Joses. The album was mastered at Metalworks Studios in Canada. Brymo released the music video for "Heya" the following day; it was filmed by NVMB3R Production and received mixed reviews upon release. The video features Brymo exposing his buttocks while wearing a loincloth to hide his genitals, In an e-mail to Pulse Nigeria, Brymo defended his decision to expose his buttocks, saying; "I decided to appear how my forebears dressed before the arrival of civilization to Nubian continent".

In September 2018, Brymo released Oriri's Plight, a self-referential fictional novel centred around a young Nubian man of the Dark Ages. The digital version of the book was published worldwide on all digital book platforms and the physical version was published in Nigeria on 4 October 2018. Clockwyce Publishing published and distributed Oriri's Plight.

=== 2019–2021: A.A.A, Yellow, Verses, acting debut, Libel, Èsan, and Harmattan & Winter ===
In 2019, Brymo teamed up with three members of Skata Vibration to form A.A.A, an alternative rock band that also included guitarist Jad Moukarim, drummer Adey Omotade, and bassist Laughter. The band's five-track eponymous debut EP was released on 5 August 2019; it is a fusion of African folk and psychedelic rock. Mikky Me Joses mixed and mastered the EP, which was recorded at Blackstar Studios in Ikoyi, Lagos. Music critic Kolawole Michael said: A.A.A is a "decent experimental piece, a litmus test that foretells what Brymo’s next project may sound like. It's a show of Brymo tenacity, a testament to his songwriting skill and vocal phrasing."

Brymo's seventh studio album, Yellow, whose cover art and track list were unveiled in March 2020, was released on 1 April 2020. Brymo said Yellow is about "love and survival", and that it would be an alternative pop and electronic record. Yellow incorporates elements of sentimental ballad, trap, sophisti-pop, shoegaze, rock, synth-pop, and folk music. The album's cover art is Insight and Frustrations 2020, a painting by Nigerian artist Samuel Olowomeye Ancestor. On Instagram, Brymo said he was drawn to the painting after having several conversations with his friends. Nigerian singer Lindsey Abudei is the only artist featured on the album. With the exception of "Abụ Ya", which was co-produced by Nsikak David and Abudei, Mikky Me Joses produced and engineered Yellow. The album explores topics such as love, heartbreak, socio-politics, and mental health.

Yellow spans three sides and was initially composed of 17 tracks, six of which were recorded in English, five in Nigerian Pidgin, five in Yoruba, and one in Igbo. The album's three sides were numbered in Arabic, Roman and English numerals, respectively. On 24 March, Brymo cited technical reasons for omitting the tracks "Iya Awele" and "Ife" from the album. Yellow was nominated for Best Alternative Album and Album of the Year at The Headies 2020. In May 2023, the album was removed from streaming platforms; according to Brymo, Abudei was unhappy with how he handled her involvement in the project. "Abụ Ya", a track recorded and written solely by Abudei, was excluded from the track list when the album was reinstated on streaming services.

In April 2020, Brymo released the e-book Versus, which is alternatively titled Verses (Musings, Notes and Prose). Brymo made his acting debut in Udoka Oyeka's 2021 short film Price of Admission, in which he played Kola, a musician who struggles to get a record deal and attain fame. The film was screened in Lagos on 24 January and premiered on YouTube in June 2021. Brymo's debut EP, Libel, was released on 5 November 2020; the five-track EP was produced by Bigfoot and includes guest vocals by Deborah Prest. Its cover art depicts a pair of women's panties, blood, and a broken glass. On the record, Brymo addresses a rape accusation made on social media by a woman. In a review for YNaija, Kola Muhammed said the EP is a "musical diary bearing tales of anguish" and that Brymo "sought to heal himself from the pain of defamation". Pulse Nigeria's Motolani Alake awarded the EP a rating of 8.2 out of 10, saying it is "largely about Brymo's journey back to life, as aided by love".

In September 2021, Brymo simultaneously released 9: Èsan (Yoruba: Revenge) and 9: Harmattan & Winter, as his eighth and ninth studio albums, respectively. Both albums have nine tracks, and include a mixture of alt-rock, R&B, sentimental ballad, and folk music; and are dedicated to Brymo's romantic partner. Brymo said both albums are an “ode to every 1, to every SIGMA, woman and man, to order!". He also said both records pay homage to karma and to the seasons. All of the songs on Èsan were recorded entirely in Yoruba, and were produced and mastered by Mikky Me Joses. 9: Èsan was nominated for Best Alternative Album and Album of the Year at The Headies 2022. Bigfoot produced 9: Harmattan & Winter, which was recorded entirely in English; its title symbolizes a transition from insufficiency to sufficiency.

=== 2022-2024: Theta, Ethos, rebranding, Mansa and Macabre ===
Brymo's tenth studio album, Theta, was released on 27 May 2022, along with his third book The Bad Tooth. Ten tracks comprise the album, which was recorded entirely in Nigerian Pidgin. Brymo announced the album's track list in a Twitter post; he described it as a "study of humanity's struggles—and a view into what it might have been". Bigfoot produced, mixed, and mastered all of the album's tracks. In a review for The Cable Lifestyle, Fareedat Taofeeq awarded the album seven stars out of 10, calling it a "great piece" and commending Brymo for "maintaining his style and music direction over the years". In a review for Pulse Nigeria, Motolani Alake rated the album 8.2 out of 10, calling it simplistic and noting it often "feels like a fly on the wall". Alake also commended Brymo for not "forcing his opinions, thoughts and views down anybody's throat".

On 12 August 2022, Brymo and rapper A-Q announced on Instagram they would release a collaborative album titled Ethos. Ten tracks comprise the album, which Bigfoot produced. Primarily a hip-hop record, the album contains additional elements of afrobeat, jazz, folk, and R&B. A-Q described the album as "personal stories about life, loss and love". Motolani Alake of Pulse Nigeria rated the album 9.9 out of 10, praising its production and acknowledging both artists for "assuming the positions of philosophers who examined the meaning of life as it relates to self, love, and loss". In 2022, Brymo starred in Biyi Bandele's Elesin Oba, The King's Horseman, a Yoruba-language Nigerian film that is based on Wole Soyinka's 1975 stage play Death and the King's Horseman. He sang the background music in the film's trailer.

Brymo rebranded himself as a sonic artist in 2022. Mansa, his eleventh studio album and debut as a sonic artist, was exhibited at KAP Hub on 3 March 2023. He revealed the album's cover art the previous year and said the project would be released in the first quarter of 2023. He also said only one copy of the album would be available for purchase and that it would be sold for $500,000. In an interview with The Cable Lifestyle newspaper, Brymo said Mansa is the first of a three-part sonic project he plans to release in the next three years. Brymo's twelfth studio album, Macabre, was released in December 2023. He made the announcement about the album's release on 8 September 2022. Macabre is composed of fourteen tracks and was described by the singer as a "reggae album sung in English".

=== 2025–present: Petrichor ===
On 1 January 2025, Brymo released Petrichor, his thirteenth studio album and second sonic project. The album is being sold for $10,000 and includes two vinyl discs and a customized record player. "Olú Ọ̀run", the Yoruba version of "God is in Your Mind", is included on Petrichor. A short clip of Brymo performing the song was uploaded to Instagram in February 2025. On the day of the album's release, Brymo held a virtual exhibition to promote the project. The event was live-streamed on the website Sigmasonic.art, and fans were able to view it for ₦4,999.

== Artistry ==
Brymo's music is a blend of alternative rock, afro-soul, folk, fuji, R&B, reggae, pop and rock. He told Damiete Braide his music can be called pop due to its ability to communicate with people. Brymo's albums Merchants, Dealers & Slaves and Tabula Rasa comment on social injustice and chaos that are prevalent in Nigerian society. In a 2016 interview with OkayAfrica, Brymo said; "Although my songs reflect many issues which are relevant in my society, I believe that human relations is the site where all issues emerge". Music critic Michael Kolawole said Brymo's music has doses of "profanity couched in intellectualism and philosophical thoughts".

== Controversies ==
In January 2023, Brymo announced on Twitter his support for Bola Tinubu in the 2023 Nigerian presidential election and said an Igbo presidency will remain a fantasy as long as there are talks about Biafra in the country's South East. Many of Peter Obi's supporters on Twitter called Brymo's comments offensive and tribalistic. Brymo garnered public support for Tinubu in May 2022. A petition that was launched through Change.org and signed by over 40,000 people called for Brymo's nominations at the eighth annual All Africa Music Awards to be revoked.

In July 2023, Brymo revealed on Twitter that he turned down a collaboration with Simi after she refused to have sex with him. Simi's husband, Adekunle Gold, warned Brymo to stay away from his wife and family. Brymo described his action as "an artistic pursuit", and said he did not know she and Adekunle Gold were in a relationship.

== Personal life ==
Brymo has a son who was born on 27 March 2015. On 12 November that year, he uploaded pictures of his son to his Instagram account for the first time. Brymo is married to his son's mother, Esse Kakada, who lent vocals to "Naked", a song from Klĭtôrĭs. On multiple tracks from the albums Èsan and Harmattan & Winter, Brymo opens up about cheating on his wife and talks about their brief separation.

== Discography ==
Studio albums
Non-sonic

- Brymstone (2007)
- The Son of a Kapenta (2012)
- Merchants, Dealers & Slaves (2013)
- Tabula Rasa (2014)
- Klĭtôrĭs (2016)
- Oṣó (2018)
- Yellow (2020)
- 9: Èsan (2021)
- 9: Harmattan & Winter (2021)
- Theta (2022)
- Macabre (2023)
- Shaitan: Telekinesis (2025)
- Shaitan: Àródan (2025)

Sonic

- Mansa (2023)
- Petrichor (2025)

Collaborative albums

- Ethos (with A-Q) (2022)

Compilation and live albums

- Trance (2015)
- Live! at Terra Kulture Arena (2019)

EPs

- A.A.A (with Skata Vibration as A.A.A) (2019)
- Libel (2020)

== Filmography ==
- Price of Admission (2021)
- Elesin Oba, The King's Horseman (2022)

== Books ==
- Oriri's Plight (2018)
- Verses (2020)
- The Bad Tooth (2022)
