= ...and the Bass Is Queen =

...And The Bass Is Queen.

Studio album by Lindsey Abudei
- Released: July 5, 2016
- Recorded: 2014–2016
- Genre: Rock; blues; jazz; alternative R&B; alternative rock; indie
- Length: 50:00
- Producer: Atta Lenell Otigba; Mosadoluwa Adegboye; Lindsey Abudei

Lindsey Abudei chronology
Brown (2013)	...And The Bass Is Queen. (2016)	Kaleidoscope (2023)

...And The Bass Is Queen is the debut studio album by Nigerian singer-songwriter Lindsey Abudei. It was released on July 5, 2016, and serves as the follow-up to her 8-track debut EP, Brown (2013).

== Critical reception ==
Professional ratings
Review scores
Source	Rating
Pulse Nigeria	4/5 stars
Jaguda	4.5/5 stars

The album received favorable reviews from music critics. Joey Akan of Pulse Nigeria awarded the album 4 stars of out of 5, praising its production and describing it as a "singer-songwriter's album". Wilfred Okiche of 360 Nobs said the album is very relatable and commended Abudei's songwriting for being "a refreshing break from the norm, simple with a hint of mystery that does not encroach into fake deep territory".

== Track listing ==
No.	Title	Length
1.	"Have You?"	1:44
2.	"Drift Away"	5:28
3.	"Out the Magazine"	3:42
4.	"Libra Man"	4:35
5.	"When You Don't Drive Me Mad"	4:39
6.	"Freedom and I"	4:33
7.	"High"	6:21
8.	"Scream at the Sun"	2:59
9.	"Apologise"	3:30
10.	"Home (Free)"	4:42
11.	"Shoot Them Down"	3:29
12.	"Leaving"	4:12
Total length:		50:00

== Personnel ==
- Atta Lenell Otigba – production (tracks 1, 2, 3, 4, 5, 6, 7, 8, 9, 10, 12)
- Mosadoluwa Adegboye – production (track 11)
- Mike Schoonmaker – mastering engineer
- Ayo Ajayi – executive producer
