= Oris Aigbokhaevbolo =

Nigerian writer and critic

- Born: Nigeria
- Education: Pharmacy, University of Benin
- Occupations: Writer, essayist, critic
- Writing career
- Subjects: African cinema, Nollywood, Pop culture, African literature
- Notable awards: AFRIMA Entertainment Journalist of the Year

Oris Aigbokhaevbolo is a Nigerian writer, critic, essayist and the winner of an All Africa Music Awards for Music/Entertainment Journalist of the Year. In 2023, he was named a Golden Globes international voter.

== Early life and career ==
Aigbokhaevbolo studied pharmacy at the University of Benin, Nigeria where he obtained a Doctor of Pharmacy. He has appeared at academies for film criticism in Germany, South Africa, and Netherlands.

He voted in the annual Sight and Sound Poll of the Greatest Films of All Time for 2022, putting Citizen Kane and Viva Riva! on his list. He has contributed to The Guardian, The Washington Post, The New York Review of Books, the London Review of Books, Sight and Sound, and The Africa Report.

Aigbokhaevbolo is the cofounder and editor in chief of the literary magazine Efiko and the founder of the film publication Film Efiko. He has written film reviews for BellaNaija.

=== Controversy ===
In 2023, Aigbokhaevbolo wrote "The Death of Nigerian Literature", an essay about the decline in readership and support for literary matters in his country. Weeks after it was published, the essay sparked responses from other Nigerian writers, most of whom focused on Aigbokhaevbolo's commentary on Nigerian writers who left their country for MFA programmes in the west. The essay received a flurry of responses and topped one year-end list of notable essays.

== Awards and honours ==
Aigbokhaevbolo is the winner of the 2015 All Africa Music Awards (AFRIMA) for entertainment journalism. Two years later, he was named the winner of the 2017 Felabration Award for Best Media Reports.

In 2014, Aigbokhaevbolo was selected to join the Durban Talent Press, a programme for budding African critics. In 2015, Aigbokhaevbolo was chosen by the International Film Festival Rotterdam as one of four critics to attend its Young Critics Project. The Berlin Talents programme invited him in the same year.

He was invited to join the 2023 International Documentary Film Festival Amsterdam as a jury member and has spoken about Nollywood at International Distribution Summit in Cologne, Germany.

In 2024, Aigbokhaevbolo was included among the Nollywood 100, a list of influential people in the Nigerian film industry by YNaija.
