= Ahmed Soultan =

Moroccan musical artist

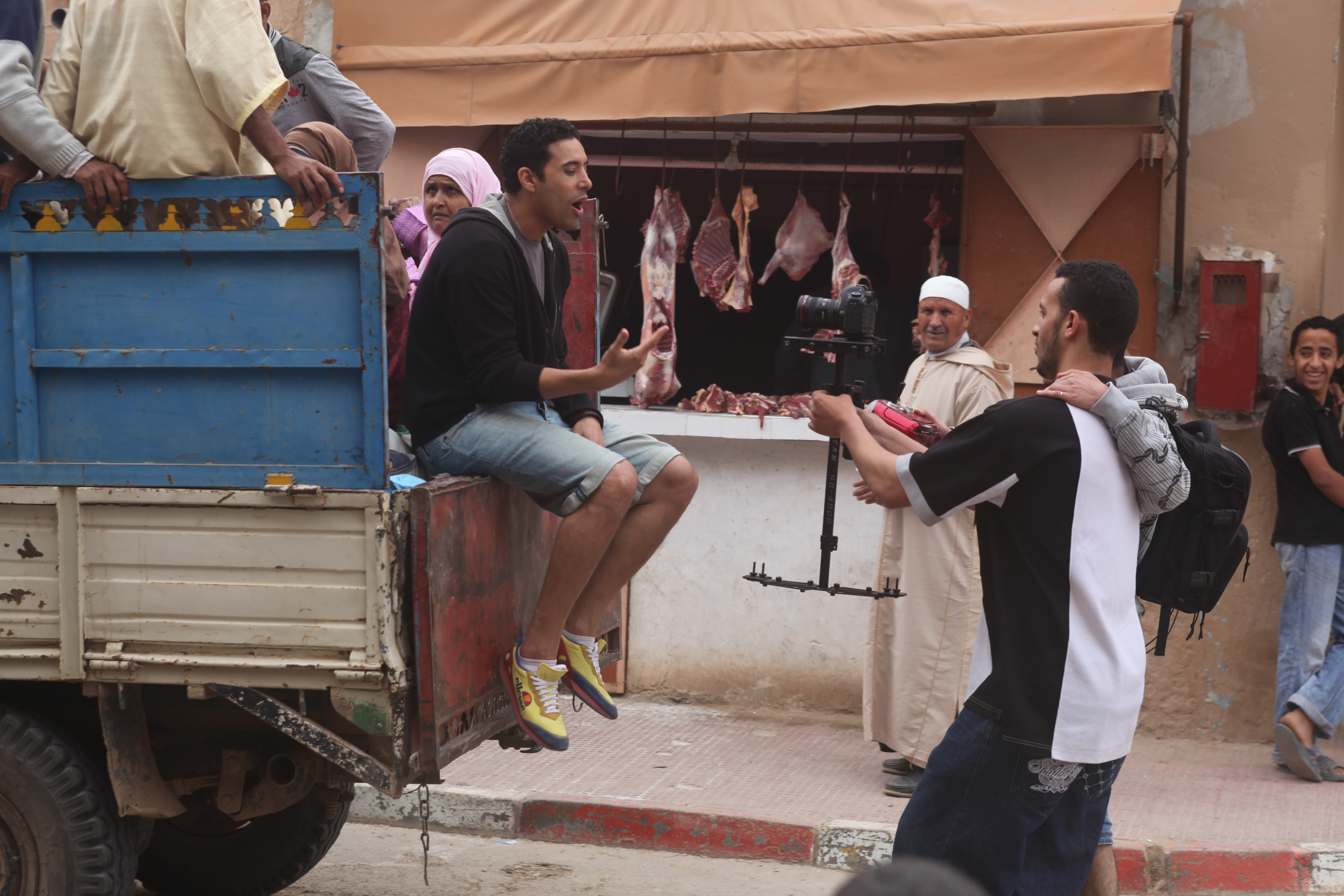

Background information
- Born: June 17, 1978 (age 48); Taroudant, Souss-Massa-Drâa, Morocco
- Genre: "Afrobian" (Afro-Arabian Soul)
- Occupation: Singer
- Instruments: Vocals, guitar, keyboards, drums
- Years active: 2005–present
- Label: SOMUM Records
- Website: ahmedsoultan.com

Ahmed Soultan (Berber languages: ⵃⵎⴰⴷ ⵙⵍⵟⴰⵏ, Arabic: أحمد سلطان; born June 17, 1978) is a Moroccan singer and songwriter. He is considered one of the leaders of the "Nayda" (new urban Moroccan scene).

Ahmed Soultan is an Afro-Arabian soul artist whose music embodies cultural universality, blending languages and traditions in his work. His discography reflects this fusion: "Tolerance" (2005), is debut album, featuring the breakout single "Ya Salam" (sung in Arabic and French); "Code" (2009), is sophomore release, led by the multilingual track "Achkide" (combining Berber and French).

Through his music, Soultan bridges linguistic and cultural divides, making him a distinctive voice in contemporary Afro-Arabian soul.

== Biography ==
With the success of his first single "Ya Salam", Ahmed Soultan reveals himself as the precursor of a new style he likes to name: the Afrobian Soul, for Afro-Arabian. His album Tolerance was given wide media coverage, so Ahmed Soultan soon became one of the figureheads of the "Nayda", the new Moroccan scene.

After a second album, released in 2009, in which he asserts himself, his popularity in and over the Maghreb was confirmed. Singing in four languages (Amazigh, Arabic, English and French), he took part in many international musical events, including the Kora Awards in South Africa, the opening of a Tiken Jah Fakoli concert in Dakar, his contribution to the People Power song (beside Talib Kweli, Angelique Kidjo or Zap Mama ), Fez's Sacred Musics Festival, Marrakesh's Moonfest, Casablanca Music Festival and many other European scenes (Barcelona, Amsterdam, Paris)

He became involved in various projects : he wrote the original soundtrack of Rhimou, a successful sitcom broadcast in Morocco and more; he collaborated with the famous American singer Ne-Yo, on a song called "Amazing You"; in 2011, his song "Jokko" was nominated as best North African song and best African reggae song of the year.

Still largely supported by the media, in Africa and the Arab World, his singles "Ya Salam " and "Koula Lila" accompanied the opening of MTV Arabia and were regularly played on Maghreb channels.

== Early life ==
Soultan was born in Taroudant in the region of Souss-Massa-Drâa.

== Career ==
In 2005, Soultan was invited to take part in the Dakar International Festival of Film and was a supporting artist in a concert by Tiken Jah Fakoly.

Also in 2005, Ahmed Soultan was invited to perform at the Kora Awards in South Africa, to represent North Africa. The same year, he opened one of Tiken Jah Fakoly's concerts in Dakar. In 2007, Ahmed Soultan produced the soundtrack of a successful series broadcast in Morocco and the Arab world.

In 2010, Ahmed Soultan appeared on "Amazing You" from Ne-Yo's album The Apprenticeship of Mr. Smith (The Birth of Ne-Yo).

In 2011, his song "Jokko" ("The Link" in Wolof) was nominee for Best North African Song and Best African Reggae song of the year.

In 2011, for the "Radiowaves Project" he was featured on "People Power" a song produced by Anthony Tidd (The Roots, Talib Kweli) alongside Talib Kweli, Angélique Kidjo, Zap Mama, and Freshlyground to fight climate change in Africa and the world in general.

He has performed at the "Casablanca Music Festival", the "Sacred Musics Festival" of Fes, the "Moonfest" of Marrakesh, and at European venues in Barcelona and Amsterdam.

In 2012 he was nominee on the 2012 MTV Europe Music Awards in Frankfurt, on the category "Best Middle East Act" [Won], "Best Middle East, Africa, India" [Won], then "Best WorldWide Act".

In 2013 he won "Best Pop Act" at the "Meditel Morocco Music Awards."

At the 2013 MTV Europe Music Awards, he was MTV Best North Africa & Middle East (Won), MTV Best Africa/Middle East/India (Won) and MTV Worldwide Act (Nominee).

Legendary George Clinton, Femi Kuti, Fred Wesley, Pee Wee Ellis and RZA are collaborating on MHNB (Music Has No Boundaries), his third album that was due be released in Spring 2014. The album was officially released on 23 January 2016 in Virgin Megastore and Carrefour Markets throughout Morocco, as well as international digital platforms iTunes and Amazon.

== Discography ==
*Tolerance (2005)
No.	Title	Length
1.	"Ya Salam"
2.	"Ignorance"
3.	"Kounti Saber"
4.	"Kaine Li"
5.	"Shy"
6.	"Habibi"
7.	"Brother N' Sister"
8.	"Give Me Your Name"
9.	"No Matter"
10.	"My Woman"
11.	"Koula Lila"
12.	"Perdu"
13.	"Ya Salam" (English Version)

*Code (2009)
No.	Title	Length
1.	"Achkide" (feat. Afrodiziac)
2.	"Itim"
3.	"Hayatna" (feat. Mobydick)
4.	"Goddam Girl"
5.	"Tous Les Mêmes"
6.	"Iwi"
7.	"Nti O Ana" (feat. Samira)
8.	"Breathe"
9.	"Bent Nass"
10.	"Each Time"
11.	"Yallah"
12.	"Hayatna" (feat. Mobydick [English Version])
13.	"Nti O Ana" (feat. Samira [English Version])
14.	"Achkide" (feat. Afrodiziac [English Version])

*MHNB (Music Has No Boundaries) (2016)
No.	Title	Length
1.	"Afrobian" (feat. Femi Kuti, Fred Wesley, Pee Wee Ellis, Mehdi Nassouli (Radio Edit))
2.	"Ana O Rassi"
3.	"MHNB" (feat. George Clinton (Music Has No Boundaries))
4.	"Binatna"
5.	"Wrong About Me" (feat. Tekitha)
6.	"Champion"
7.	"This Is Who I Am" (feat. Wiyaala)
8.	"Warda/Rose"
9.	"Dwa Diali" (feat. Samira)
10.	"Feel My Life"
11.	"El Walidin"
12.	"My Mood"
13.	"Wonder" (feat. Akala)
14.	"Afrobian" (feat. Femi Kuti, Fred Wesley, Pee Wee Ellis, Mehdi Nassouli (Extended))
15.	"Nti O Ana" (feat. Samira (Rhimou Bonus))
16.	"Bent Nass" ((Rhimou Bonus))
17.	"My Jailer" ((Bonus))

== See also ==
- Music of Morocco
- Languages of Morocco
- Moroccan hip-hop
