= Motolani Alake =

Nigerian music journalist and lawyer

- Born: Motolani Olusegun Alake
- Occupations: Music executive; Critic; Journalist
- Known for: Pulse Nigeria
- Title: Label executive

Motolani Olusegun Alake is a Nigerian lawyer, music executive, entrepreneur, public speaker, podcast host, and TV host, who has also been a pop culture commentator, and journalist. He was the Editor-In-Chief at Pulse Nigeria from March 2022 to December 2022. He currently serves as the chart manager for Nigeria's TurnTable Top Afro-Pop Songs chart. Alake was recruited by the African Union to join All Africa Music Awards as one of its juries for West Africa in 2022.

== Early life and career ==
Motolani Olusegun Alake was born in Ado-Ekiti, Ekiti State, and raised in Akure, Ondo State, where he had his primary and secondary education. He graduated with an LL.B. in law from Ekiti State University before enrolling at the Nigerian Law School in Lagos. In 2016, he went for his National Youth Service Corps in Eket, Akwa Ibom. Before venturing into the multimedia field, Alake practiced law and worked for humanitarian aid and corporate finance organizations. He currently serves as a pop culture journalist and produces written, visual, and audio content. Alake rose to stardom as a music critic at Pulse Nigeria, where he became the Editor-In-Chief in March 2022 and resigned in December 2022.

On 19 August 2022, Alake was recruited by the International Committee AFRIMA, in association with the African Union to join All Africa Music Awards as one of its jury members for West Africa. On 29 December 2022, he was one of the hosts of MTV Base Roundtable, a yearly TV program that ranks the hottest Nigeria songs for the year in review.

As of 2023, Alake became label, and marketing manager and A&R coordinator at Virgin Music Nigeria. In the same year, TurnTable listed Alake as one of the top 30 music executives in Nigeria.

=== Public speaking ===
- MTV Base Musicology (2021).
- Lagos Creative Enterprise Week (2022).
- Tom Tom ‘Breathe for It’ Summit (2022).
- AfricaNXT conference (2023).

== Controversies ==
=== Feuds ===
On 29 November 2020, Motolani was embroiled in a feud with Tiwa Savage, shortly after he published an article he titled “Tiwa Savage’s faux-pas and her hilarious endorsement of ‘Mungo Parking’”, where he wrote, “Quality and greatness don’t need a megaphone”. Following her album's mention on the Time Magazine, and other international media endorsements, Motolani wrote “She felt foreign media endorsement was a greater representation of what she achieved with ‘Celia’”. The music critic also pointed-out, she deserved more from Nigerian media, and also referred to the release of her studio album ‘Celia’, reminding Tiwa Savage, how Yemi Alade was a bigger trending topic, either organically or inorganically. He closed his opinion, by saying “Instead of endorsing Nigerian narratives that don’t favour her, she’d rather embrace ‘Mungo Parking’ because it favours her”.

On 30 November 2020, Tiwa Savage responded to the article on Twitter, calling out the media house Pulse Nigeria and its editor Motolani, saying, “You know how to diss out but you no fit take am when someone speaks up. Struggling brand ke. Even my son bagged more money than your whole company. I’m glad you know it’s YOU guys I was talking about because say I quiet no mean say I be fool” – don't try and turn Nigerian media against me to hide your guilty conscience,” she wrote. She took to another Tweet, where she called him, her fan, “Guy you came to my house to do interview then you asked for pictures. Bitch you are a fan. fuck you @onemotolani ”.

== Personal life ==
Motolani is a supporter of the football club Liverpool F.C.
