= Christopher Nonyelum Okeke =

Nigerian former diplomat

His Excellency Christopher Nonyelum Okeke
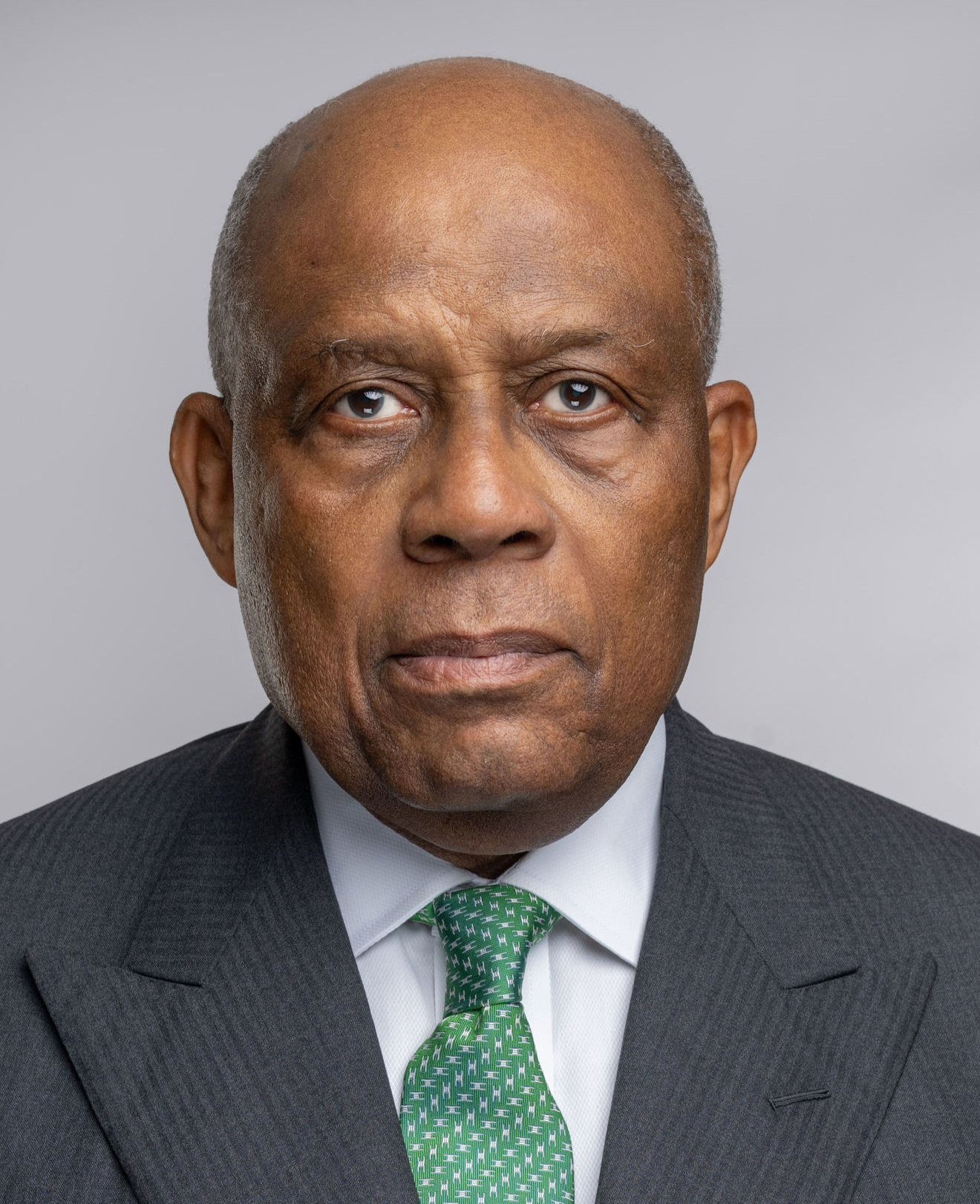
- Education: St Gregory's College Georgetown University
- Occupations: Lawyer and businessman
- Known for: Co-founding Ajumogobia & Okeke
- Spouse: Nneka Okeke
- Children: Chin Okeke (Son)

Christopher Nonyelum Okeke (born 15 January 1952), is a Nigerian businessman and lawyer who served as Nigeria's ambassador to Brazil, Paraguay and Bolivia. He is best known for co-founding Ajumogobia & Okeke, a leading commercial law firm, alongside Henry Odein Ajumogobia.

== Education ==
Okeke holds a bachelor's degree from Xavier University and a Juris Doctor (J.D) from Southern University. He bagged an LLM degree from Georgetown University in 1979 and was called to the Nigerian Bar in 1980.

== Career ==
Okeke began his legal career with U.U. Uche & Associates then later Tomisan, Thomas & Co at Western house, Lagos. He co-founded Ajumogobia & Okeke in January 1984, where he was Managing Partner until his retirement in 2009. He has held positions as chairman and director on the boards of some of the major companies in Nigeria, including Seplat, ARM pension managers, Cadbury Nigeria Plc, Eleme petrochemicals, Phillip Morris, among others. Okeke has business interests in the agro-allied sector. He owns the Nigerian Starch Mills in Anambra State and the Quarra Rice Farm in Kwara State.

== Public Service ==
Okeke was Nigeria's ambassador to Brazil, Paraguay and Bolivia between 2017 and 2020. He has served as honorary legal counsel to British high commissioners since 1989. Okeke has also served as the Legal counsel to the embassies of Canada, Austria, Germany and the Netherlands in Nigeria. He has acted as counsel to international agencies including the Department for International Development, the British Council and the International Finance Corporation.

== Personal life ==
Okeke is married to Nneka Okeke, an Oxford trained executive who was head of marketing at Nestle. He is the father of Chin Okeke.
