= Chin Okeke =

Nigerian music executive

- Born: Chinedu Okeke; 27 February 1985 (age 41); London, England, United Kingdom
- Education: Harrow School; University of Bristol
- Occupations: Music executive, entrepreneur
- Years active: 2005–present
- Known for: Gidi Culture Festival
- Spouse: Nenesi Ibru
- Parent: Christopher Nonyelum Okeke

Chinedu 'Chin' Okeke (born 27 February 1986) is a Nigerian-British entertainment entrepreneur and Record label executive. He is the founder of The Eclipse Group and co-founder of the Gidi Culture Festival. In 2020, he joined Universal Music Group as the General Manager for Nigeria and was later appointed as the Managing Director (west Africa) in 2021.

== Background ==
Okeke is the son of Christopher Nonyelum Okeke, a prominent lawyer who co-founded Ajumogobia & Okeke, one of Nigeria's leading commercial law firms. He was Nigeria's ambassador to Brazil, Bolivia and Paraguay between 2017 and 2020, and has served as honorary legal counsel to British high commissioners in Nigeria since 1989. His mother, Nneka Okeke, is an Oxford-trained corporate executive who served as head of marketing at Nestle. She founded Canvest Nigeria Limited, an FMCG company.

== Education ==
Okeke was educated at Corona School, Ikoyi then later Dragon School, Oxford. He proceeded to the Harrow School for his secondary studies and went on to bag an LLB degree from the University of Bristol.

== Career ==
After his university education, Chin undertook business training at two Fortune 500 companies; Credit Suisse in New York and the AP Moller Maersk Group in Shanghai and Lagos.

In 2010, Chin founded the Eclipse Brand Agency, a communications company.

In 2013, he founded Eclipse Live, a live entertainment company. Later on, he co-founded alongside Oriteme Banigo, The Gidi Culture Festival, one of the largest Afrobeats music festivals in West Africa. In 2017, Eclipse Live collaborated with Red Bull for the execution of the Red Bull Music Academy in Lagos.

In 2018, he was listed among one of YNaija's Top 10 in entertainment. In 2019, he was one of the selected delegates for The Great Escape, an annual music festival in Brighton, by the British Council. In 2020, he was appointed as the General manager of the Universal Music Group, Nigeria, and later became the Managing Director of West Africa in 2021. That same year, he was mentioned among the Billboard's Power Players. At the end of 2021, he left the Universal Music Group and returned to the executive board of Eclipse.

Chin is also one of the founding trustees of the ECHO Music and Arts Foundation, a non-profit organization that supports the development of the creative sector in Africa.

== Personal life ==
Okeke is married to Nenesi Ibru, a member of the Ibru dynasty and the daughter of Nigerian businessman Oskar Ibru.
