= Food and Beverage Recycling Alliance =

Producers Responsibility Organization, Extended Producer Responsibility

The Food and Beverage Recycling Alliance
- Company type: Nonprofit organization
- Industry: Extended Producer Responsibility
- Founded: 2018
- Area served: Nigeria
- Key people: Arese-Lucia Onaghise (Executive Secretary)
- Members: 29 Member Companies
- Website: https://www.fbranigeria.ng

The Food and Beverage Recycling Alliance, or simply FBRA, is a Nigerian non-profit organization that promotes extended producer responsibility and industry collaboration with the goal to unite responsible stakeholders in the food and beverage sector to support and grow waste collection, buyback, and recycling programs. FBRA was set up as the Producer Responsibility Organization (PRO) for the food and beverage industry to enhance the recovery of post-consumer packaging waste in accordance with the operational guidelines of the National Environmental Standards Regulations and Enforcement Agency (NESREA).

== History ==
The concept began in 2012, with activities commencing in 2013. FBRA was officially launched and registered as a Producer Responsibility Organizationcorporation in 2018 with just four founding companies.

The Food and Beverage Recycling Alliance currently consists of twenty-nine organizations committed to enhancing the collection and recycling of post-consumer packaging materials.

== Actions ==
Through these strategic priority areas, the FBRA is mandated to accomplish the following:

- To establish operations enhancement schemes and enabling collection and recycling;
- To promote public awareness campaigns, community engagements, and advocacy programs;
- To engage in thought leadership (industry/policy/regulatory dialogues) on waste management.

== Member companies ==
FBRA member companies:

- Nigerian Bottling Company
- Nigerian Breweries
- Seven-Up Bottling Company
- Nestle Nigeria
- PRIMA CORP LTD
- ZARD group of companies
- Tetra Pak West Africa
- FrieslandCampina
- Tulip Cocoa
- Dufil Prima Foods Plc
- International Breweries plc
- Frigoglass/Beta glass
- Omnik Limited
- CWAY group
- The Lacasera Company
- Kellogg Tolaram Nigeria Limited
- Engee Pet
- Dow Chemical
- Unilever Nigeria Plc
- Promasidor Nigeria
- UAC Foods Nig
- CHI LTD
- Guinness Nigeria PLC
- Indorama Petrochemical Eleme
- Perfetti Van Melle
- Intercontinental Distillers
- British American Tobacco
- Cadbury Nigeria Plc
- PolySmart Packaging Limited
