= Elegushi Beach =

Beach in Lagos state, Nigeria

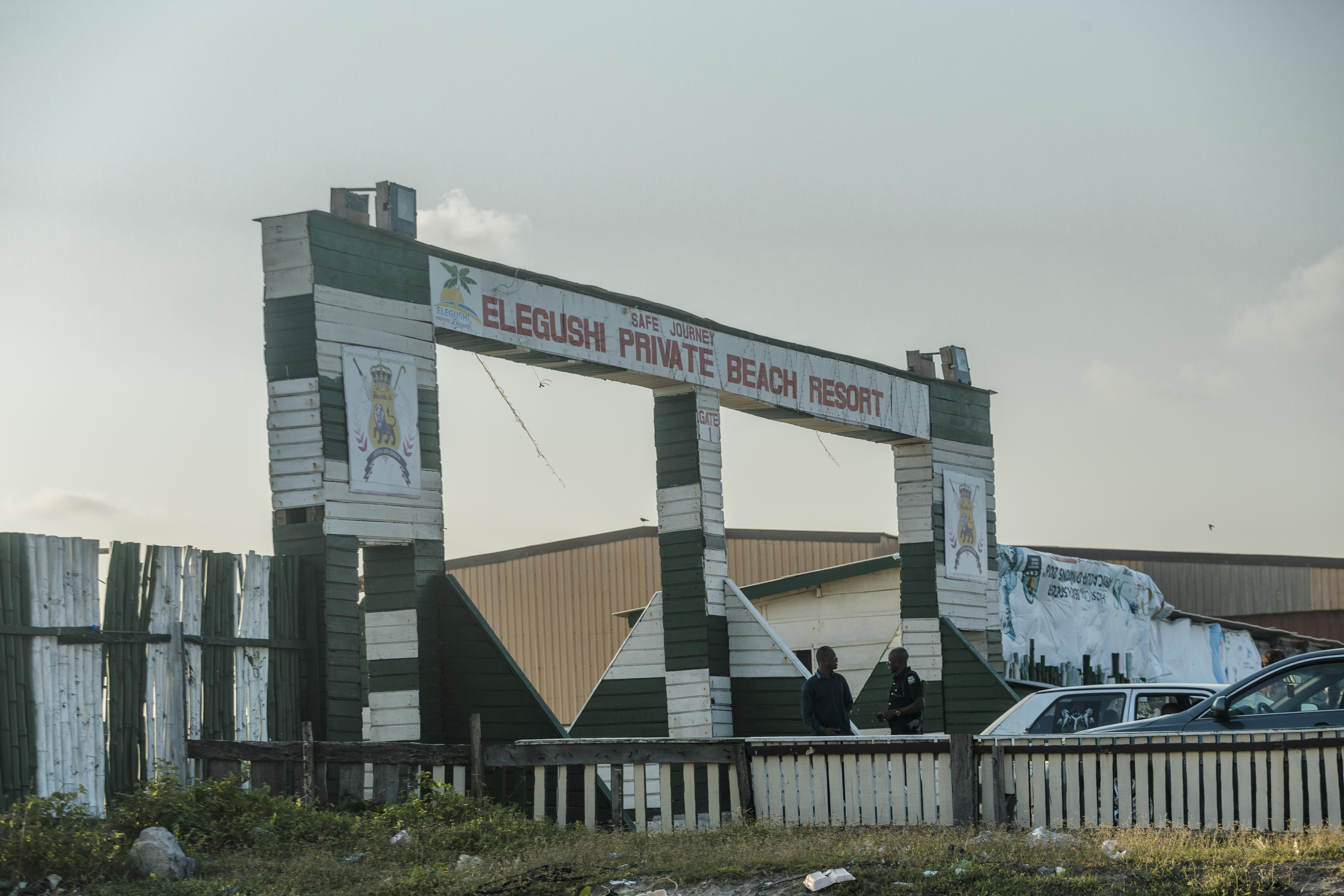

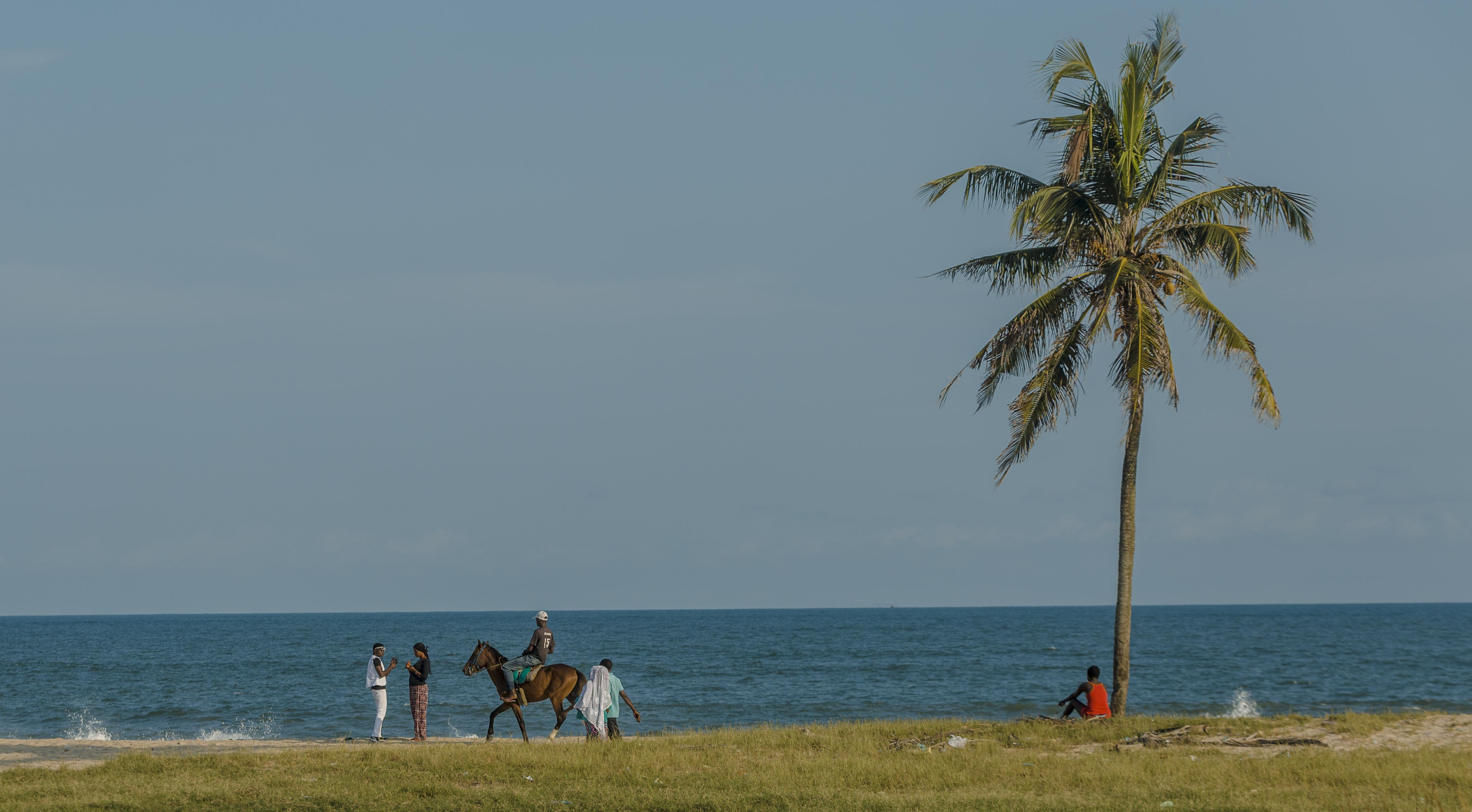

Elegushi Beach is a private beach located at Lekki, Lagos state, southwest Nigeria. The beach is owned by the Elegushi royal family in Lekki, Lagos state. Elegushi private beach is seen as one of the best beaches in Lagos and Nigeria at large. The beach entertains close to 40,000 guests every week with Sundays being the best day on the beach. Over half of all guests that are entertained on the beach weekly visit on Sundays. Their gate pass is at 2000 naira flat rate but can be discounted if you have like a group. Their official Instagram handle can be used to reach them.

== Clean up ==
Report says that on Saturday September 25, 2021, AXA Mansard’s employees joined AXA employees worldwide in clean-up activities. The staff of AXA Mansard in partnership with ‘Let’s Do It World’ carried out their clean-up activity in Elegushi beach, Lagos with the aim of increasing the cleanliness around the ocean and improving the coastal and ocean ecosystem.

Coca-Cola System, which consists of Coca-Cola Nigeria, Nigerian Bottling Company (NBC), and Chi Limited, has cleaned up Elegushi Beach to mark World Environment Day, in collaboration with the Mental and Environmental Development Initiative for Children (MEDIC).

== Climate and environmental issues ==
Elegushi Beach has over the years been faced with several climate and environmental issues. This include the presence of different kind of wastes such as plastic bottles, glass bottles, rubber slippers, polythene nylons and food wastes. In 2018, the Let’s Do It Campaign Nigeria, and the Junior Chamber International (JCI) bagged 107 wastes from within the beach environment. In 2023, the Food and Beverage Recycling Alliance conducted a cleanup exercise on the beach during the 2023 World Ocean Day, aiming to reduce plastic pollution within the beach and raise awareness about responsible waste disposal and the importance of recycling to keep the environment clean.

== Gallery ==
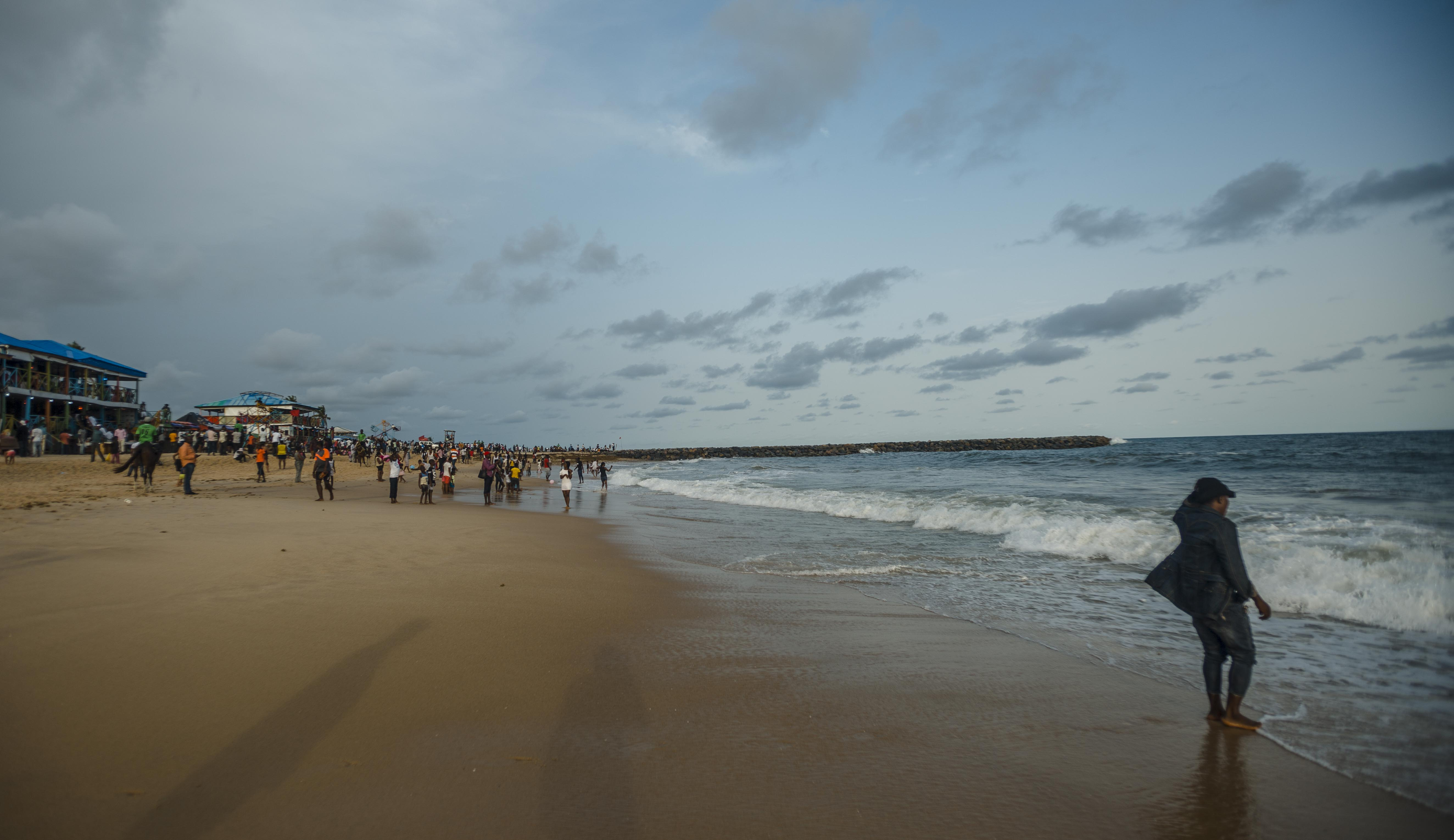

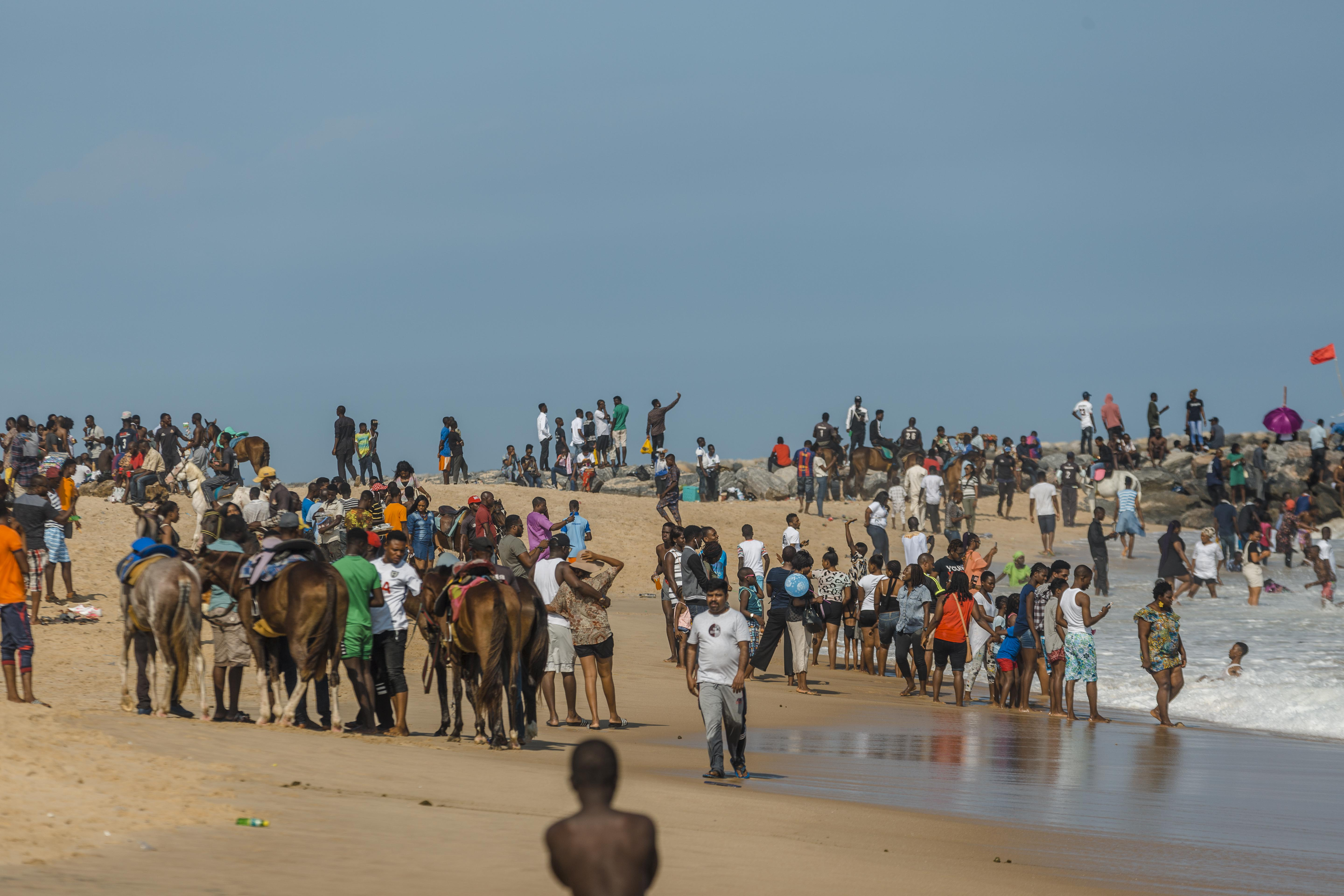

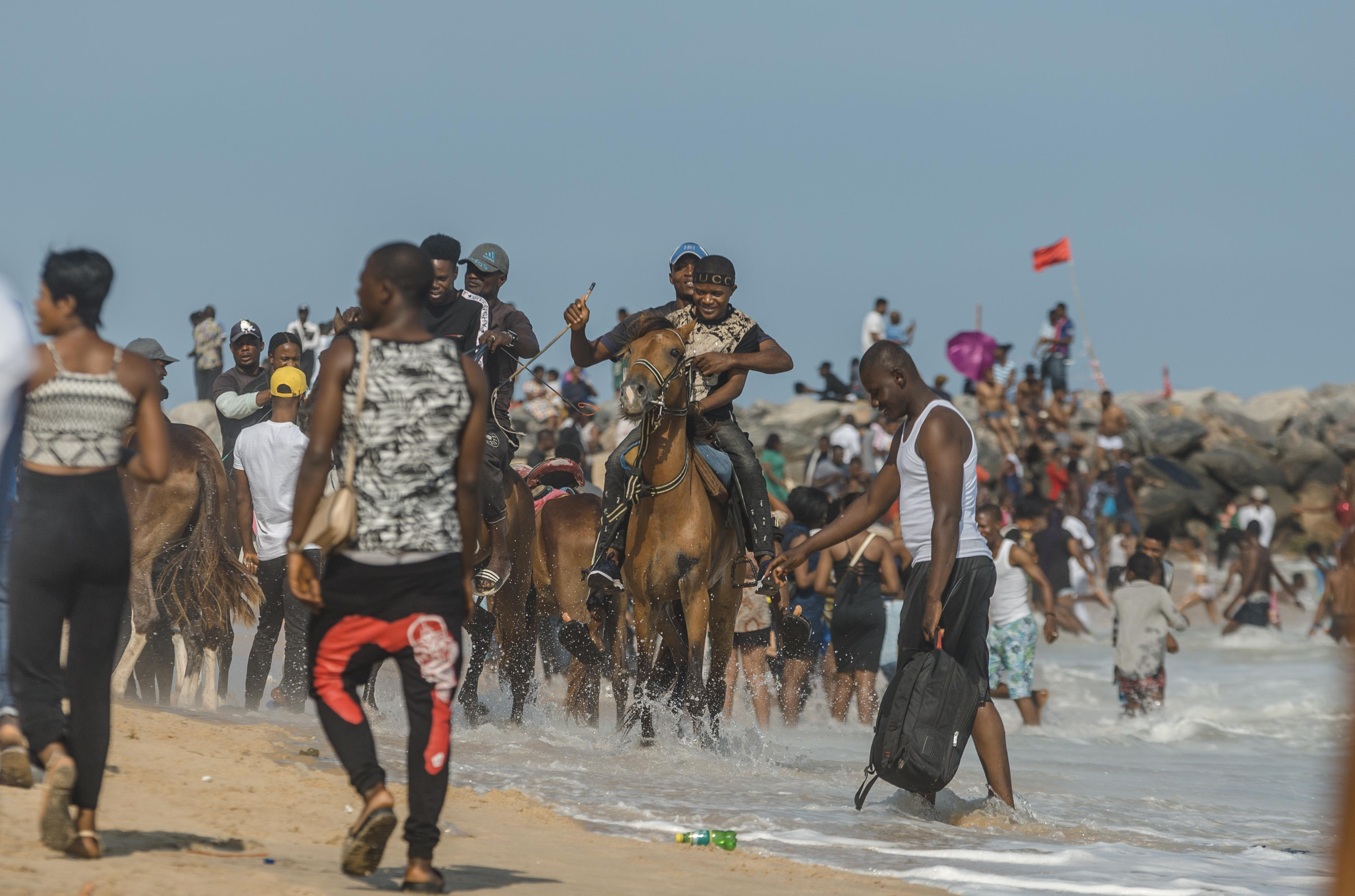

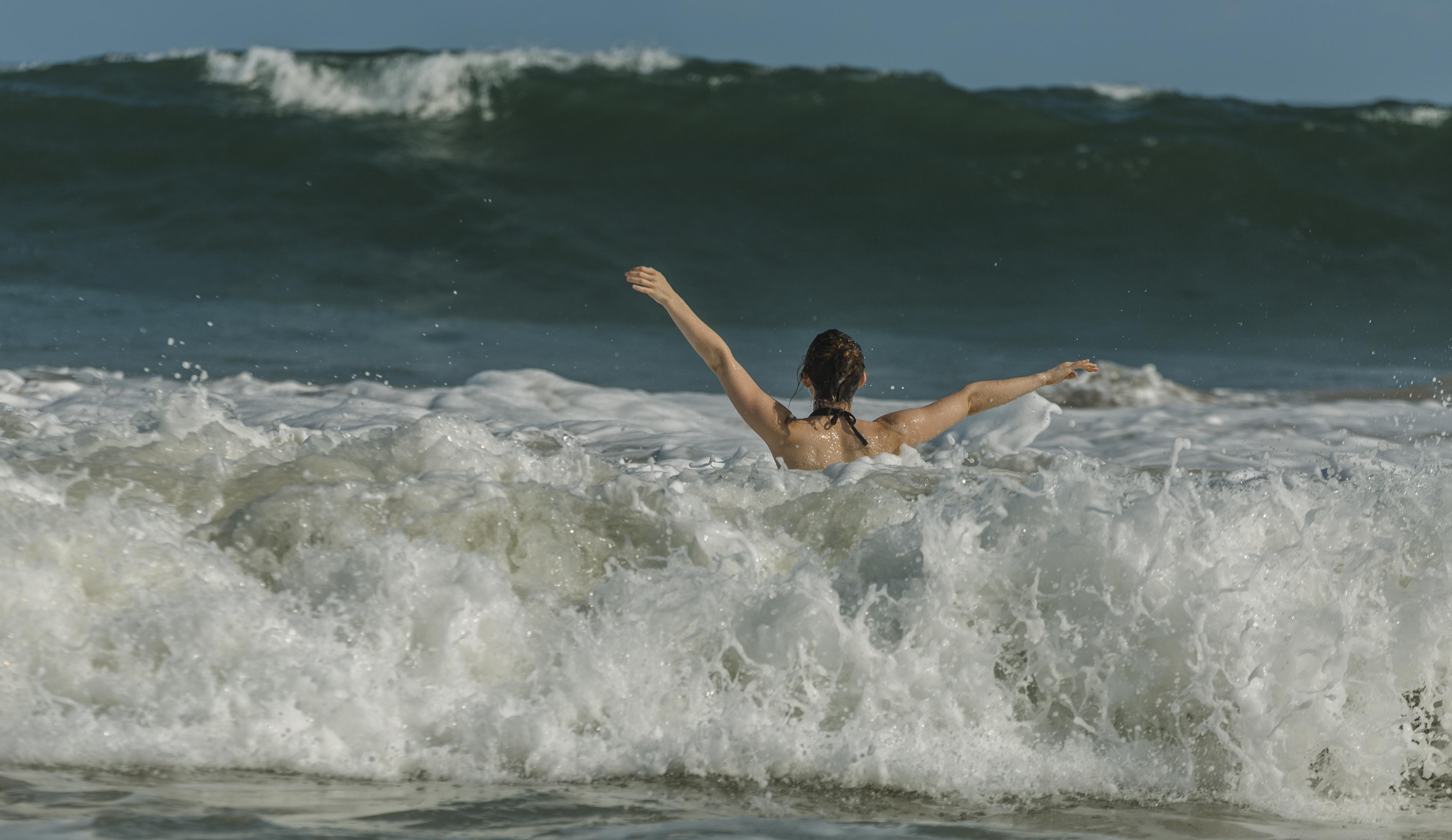

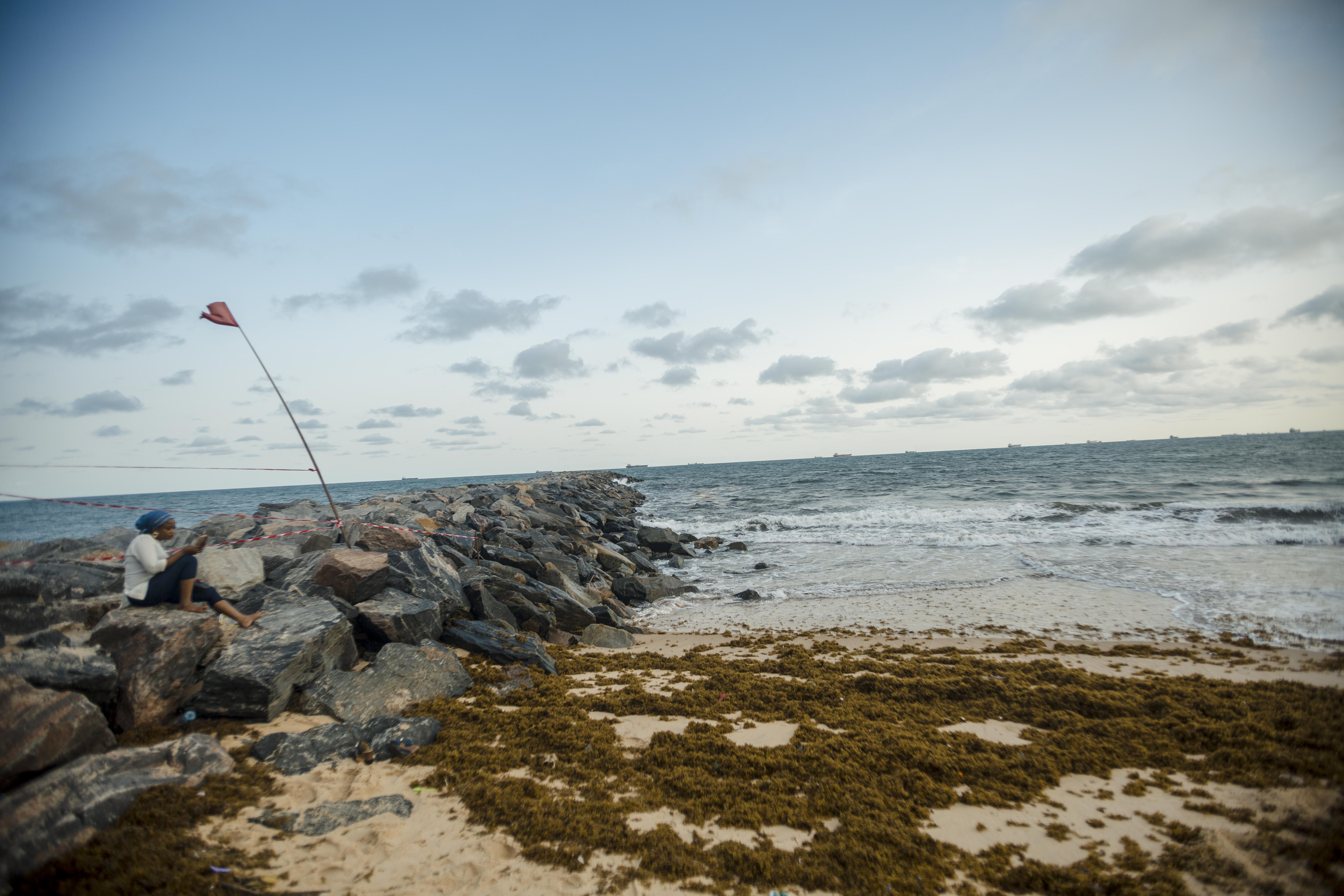

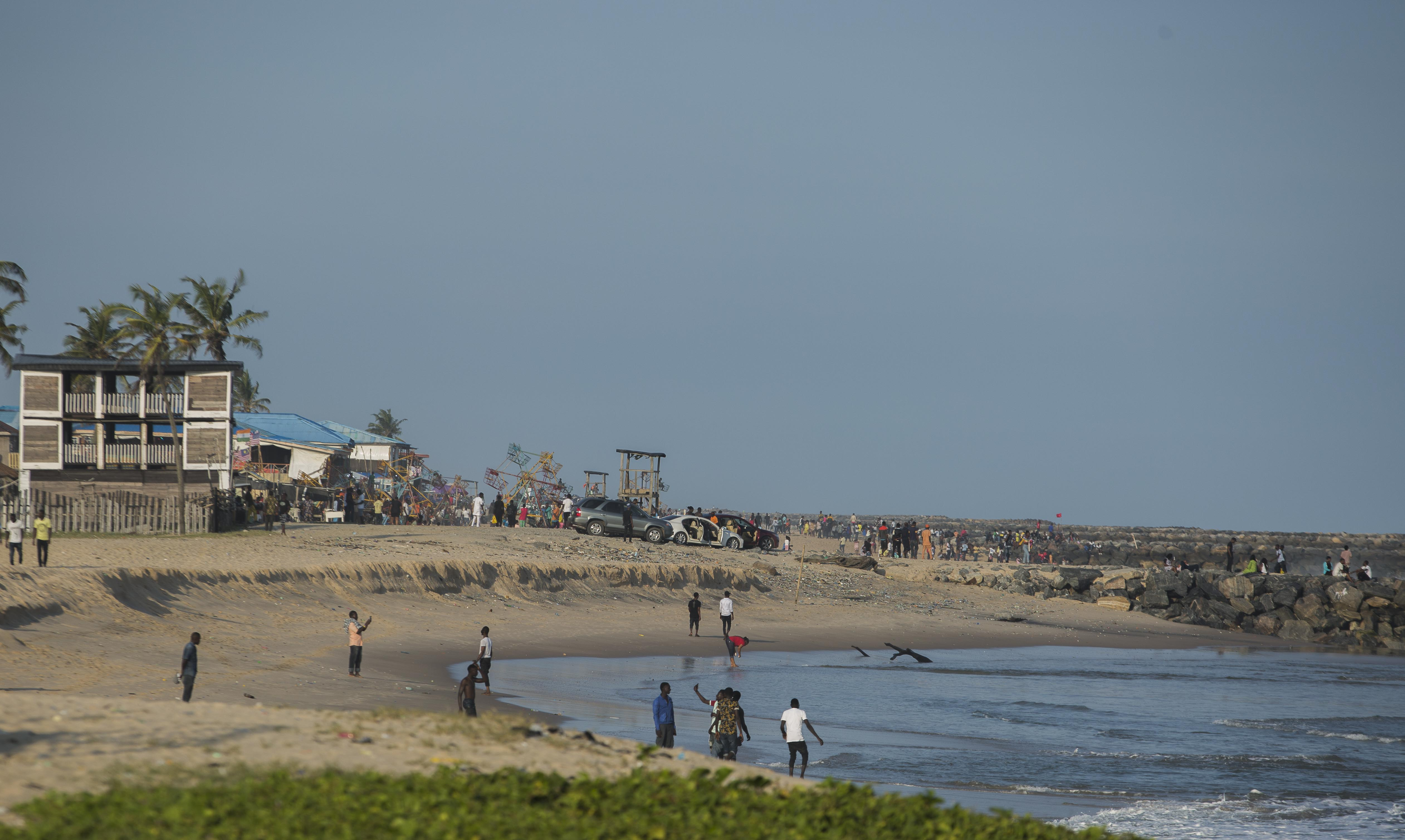

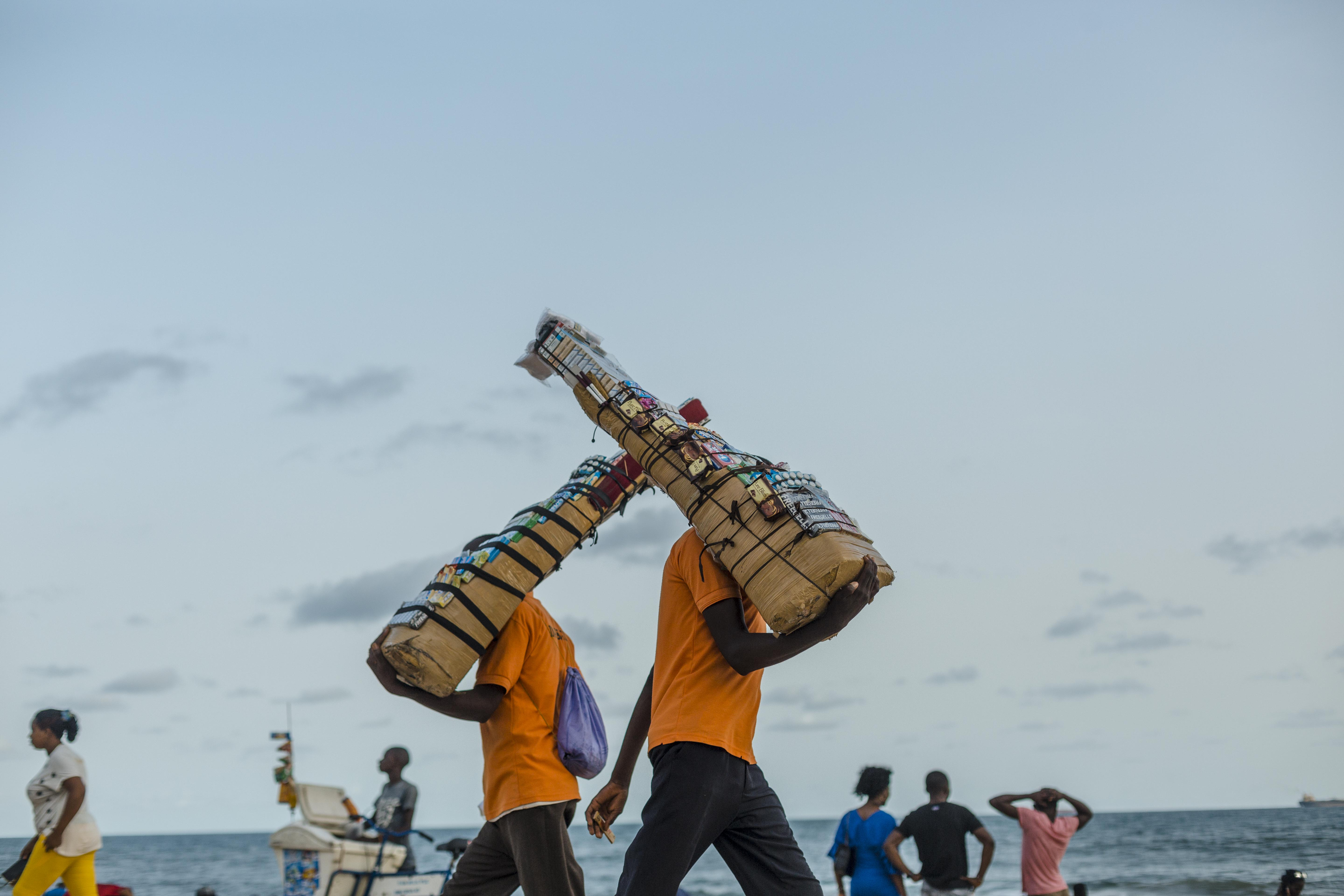

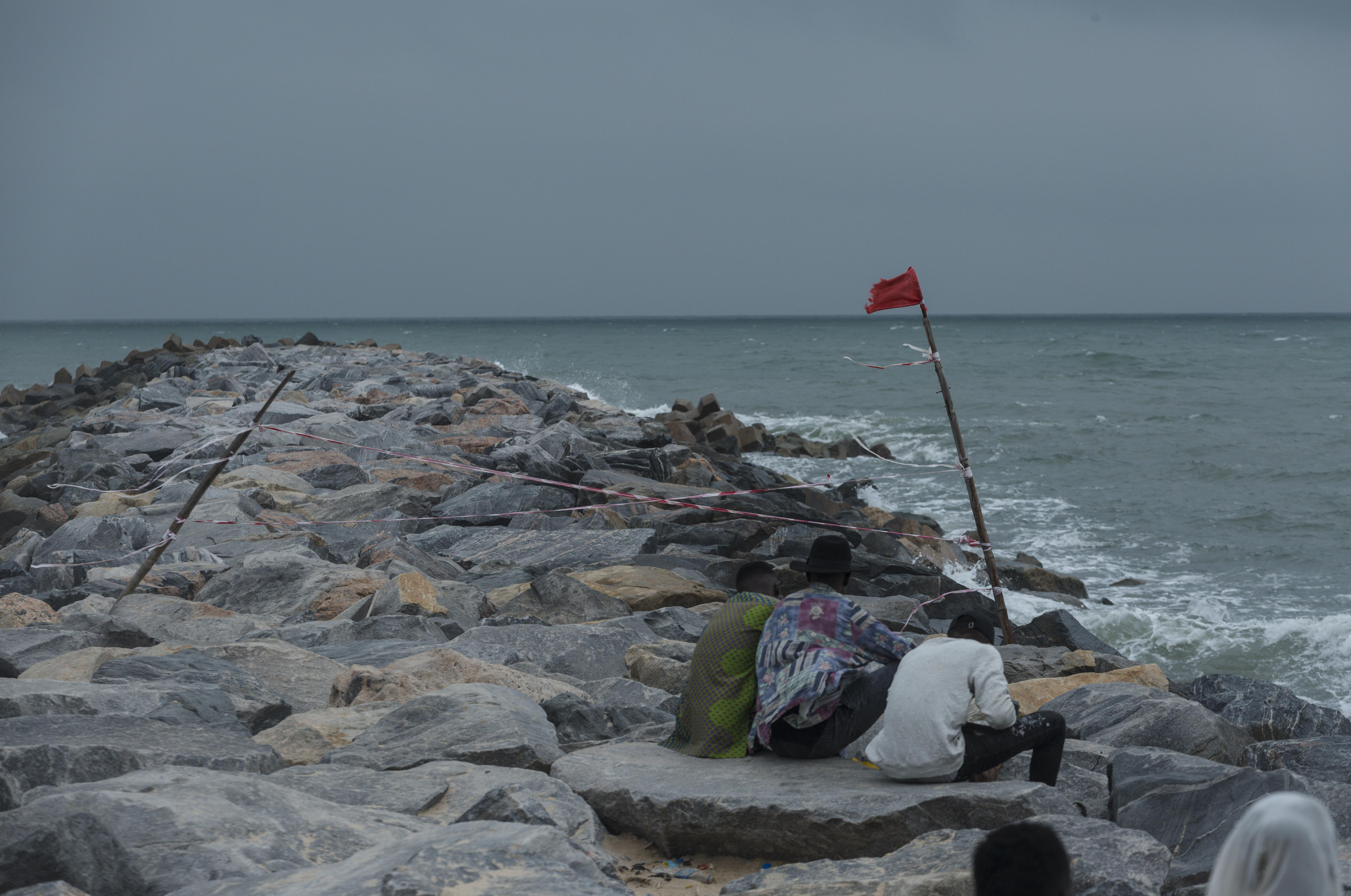
