= Stephen Onaivi =

Nigerian entertainment executive

Stephen Oluwatoyin Onaivi
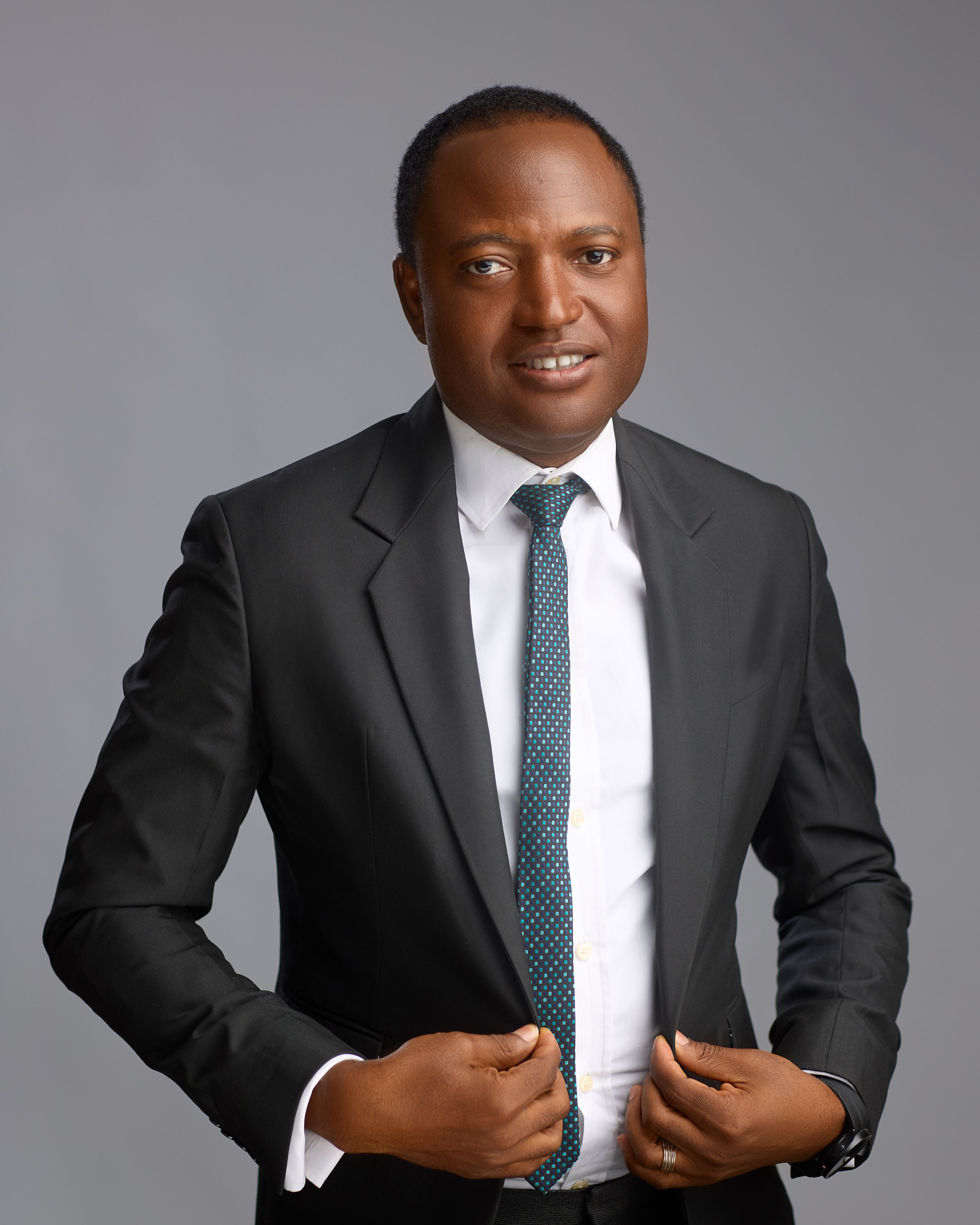
- Born: 30 August; Lagos State, Nigeria
- Occupation: Media Professional
- Organization: mediaReach OMD Nigeria
- Office: Vice President, Media Independent Practitioners Association of Nigeria

Stephen Onaivi is a Nigerian Media and Marketing Communications Professional. He is currently the Managing Director of Mediareach OMD Nigeria, currently the Vice President of the Media Independent Practitioners Association of Nigeria (MIPAN), a Fellow of the Advertising Regulatory Council of Nigeria and the Founder of Play with Stephen.

== Early life and education ==
Stephen Onaivi obtained a Bachelor of Arts (Honours) in Philosophy and a Master's Degree in Public and International Affairs, both from the University of Lagos. He is an alumnus of the Lagos Business School and has an Executive Education from the London Business School.

== Career ==
In 2018, he was appointed Managing Director of Mediareach OMD Ghana, where he oversaw the agency’s operations and strategic growth. In 2023, he was named Managing Director of Mediareach OMD Nigeria, marking a return to the Nigerian market in a leadership capacity. That same year, he was selected to serve as a jury member at the Cannes Lions International Festival of Creativity, a global event in the advertising and communications industry.

Stephen has over 15 years experience in media planning and business management across the region building brands and business, leading marketing efforts across key brands including Vodafone, Airtel, Virgin Atlantic, Google, Promasidor, Uber, GlaxoSmithKline and Diageo to mention a few across the West & Central Africa region.

He is also a Fellow of the Advertising Regulatory Council of Nigeria (ARCON).

On 29 January 2025, He led Mediareach OMD in the launch of the Top Trends 2025: Unlocking Insights in Market, Consumer, Media report in Lagos, aimed at providing businesses with data-driven insights to navigate an evolving marketing landscape.

In August 2026, he was elected Vice President of the Media Independent Practitioners Association of Nigeria (MIPAN), following the association’s 2026 Annual General Meeting (AGM) held at the Ogere Resort, Ogun State.

== Social impact ==
In 2020, He launched "Play with Stephen Initiative", a yearly charity tournament dedicated to people living with autism in Accra, Ghana. In April 2025, the sixth edition of this annual golf tournament was announced at Lakowe Lakes Golf and Country Estate with partners such as CFAO Motors, The Wheatbaker, Pepsi, Ibom Air, Olston Foundation, SPAR and Guinness.
