= Gbemileke Oscar Oyinsan =

Nigerian media personality

- Born: Oluwagbemileke Oscar Oyinsan; 2 April 1984 (age 42); Akure, Ondo State, Nigeria
- Other name: Oscar in the City
- Education: University of Lagos and Pan-Atlantic University
- Occupation: Media Personality
- Years active: 2005 – present
- Spouse: Titi Oyinsan (m. 2012)
- Children: 2
- Website: www.oscaroyinsan.com

Gbemileke Oscar Oyinsan (born 2 April 1984) is a Nigerian media personality from Akure in Ondo State, Nigeria. He is an ex-radio broadcaster who previously worked in radio stations in Nigeria, a graduate of chemical engineering and is currently the MD/CEO of Amber 11 Media.

Oyinsan is also the quiz master and host of Nigerian syndicate mathematics TV quiz competition for secondary school students called Cowbellpedia.

== Early life and education ==
Oyinsan was born in Akure, Ondo State to a veteran broadcaster father, Sanya Oyinsan, who worked in FRCN (Federal Radio Corporation of Nigeria) and a mother, Florence Oyinsan, who is a retired banker. Oscar is the last child of five siblings.

He had his university education at the University of Lagos, where he obtained a bachelor's degree in chemical engineering in 2008, and went on to obtain a Masters in Media Enterprise at the Pan Atlantic University in 2012.

== Career ==
Oyinsan's journey in media began in 2005 as an on-air personality with Unilag FM. Then moved to other media houses like the Inspiration 92.3 FM, BBC Media Action and City FM 105.1.

Oyinsan started his broadcasting career while in his second year as an undergraduate at the University of Lagos studying chemical engineering; he began working for the school's owned radio station - UNILAG FM and also at the BBC World Service Trust, where he was the pioneer male presenter for the youth radio show, FLAVA which aired across the nation.

Upon his graduation in 2008, Oyinsan joined BBC World service in Abuja as a producer and shortly returned to Lagos to join Inspiration FM, where he co-hosted a show with Titi called the Midday Café with Oscar and Titi.

Before joining Inspiration FM, Oyinsan worked with comedian, Tee A as a red carpet host for his e-news program, Showtime Africa. In 2013, he moved to City FM as an OAP and Head of Programmes.

In 2011, Oyinsan co-founded Amber 11 Media with his wife Titi Oyinsan, a creative group focused on crafting stories for advertising and entertainment.

In 2016, Oyinsan created The MCs Company. It is an organization that offers training, mentoring, and career development to Masters of Ceremonies.

Since July 2015, Oscar has been the quiz master and host of Nigerian syndicate mathematics TV quiz competition for secondary school students called Cowbellpedia. Cowbellpedia is a show which strives to identify, recognize and reward excellence in the subject area of Mathematics and is sponsored and organized by Promasidor, the makers of Cowbell Milk.

== Awards and nominations ==
Year	Event	Prize	Result
2010	The Future Awards	On-Air Personality of the Year (RADIO)	Nominated
2010	Nigeria Media Merit Awards	Programmee of the Year (Shoutout in Your Mother Tongue)	Nominated
2010	Dynamix Youth Awards	On-Air Personality of the Year (RADIO)	Nominated
2011	The Future Awards	On-Air Personality of the Year (RADIO)	Nominated

== Philanthropy ==
Oyinsan assisted his wife, Titi in setting up a fundraising education campaign for the girl child tagged "#IAmDynamite project". The campaign has received support from several Nigerian celebrities who have signed on to the project. The likes of Alibaba, Omawumi, Dr SID, Fela Durotoye, DJ Sose, Gbenga Adeyinka, Sammy Okposo, Nikki Laoye, Kaffy, Uche Nnaji, Mocheddah, Reekado Banks, Skales, Denrele, Omotola Ekeinde, Bryan, Do2dtun, Sulai Aledeh and many more.

The main goal of the #IAmDynamite project is to raise funds to send 30 young girls between the ages of 5 and 12 to school; this campaign is in partnership with the StayInSchool Nigeria Initiative founded by Tricia Ikponmwonba.

== Personal life ==
Gbemileke married ex-model and on-air personality, Titi on April 30, 2012 and the marriage is blessed with a set of twins.
