= Cowbellpedia =

Nigerian national mathematics television quiz show

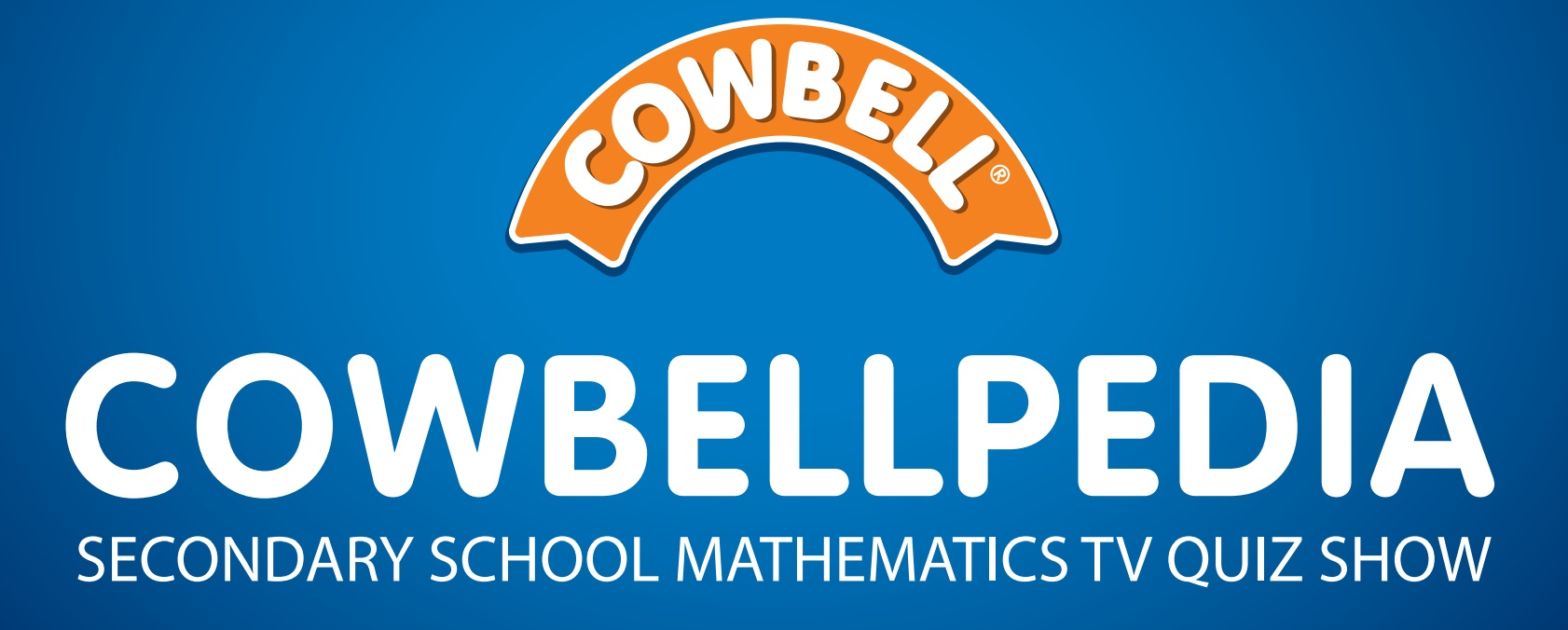
- Created by: Oladapo Ojo
- Based on: Years 9 & Years 11 Mathematics curriculum
- Developed by: JustMedia Productions of DM Holdings Limited
- Directed by: Oladapo Ojo
- Presented by: Oscar Oyinsan, Ebuka Obi-Uchendu
- Country of origin: Nigeria
- Original language: English
- No. of seasons: 6
- No. of episodes: Season 1: 13 episodes x 30 min; Season 2-3: 15 episodes x 1 hour; Season 4: 16 episodes x 1 hour; Season 5-6: 14 episodes x 1 hour

Production
- Executive producers: Season 1-2: Olivier Thiry, Festus Tettey, Oladapo Ojo; Season 3-4: Anders Einarsson, Festus Tettey, Oladapo Ojo; Season 5: Anders Einarsson, Mario Russo, Oladapo Ojo
- Producers: Ogugua Dopamu, Funmi Oladapo-Ojo
- Editors: Joseph Onyia, Sam Oriabor, Bisola Akinwande, Jacob Abiiki, Austine Ogar
- Running time: Season 1: 30 minutes; Season 2-5: 1 hour
- Production company: JustMedia Productions

Original release
- Release: 2015

Cowbellpedia Secondary Schools Mathematics TV Quiz Show is a Nigerian national mathematics television quiz show that debuted in 2015. It was created by Oladapo Ojo.

== Historical background ==
The initiative began in 1998 as Cowbell National Secondary School Mathematics Competition (NASSMAC) when it was a written examination without a TV show.

Since 1998, the Cowbell brand has been involved in promoting the study of mathematics in secondary schools across Nigeria. In the process, it has helped millions of students develop an interest in and gain a better understanding of the subject. The project is designed to identify, recognize, and reward excellence in the study of mathematics. The programme is deployed in public and private schools. It serves students between the ages of eight and eighteen.

In 2015, Promasidor Nigeria (PNG) became a sponsor of Cowbellpedia. Their sponsorship made the programme more robust. In the same year, the initiative took a new dimension when it was split into two stages. The Stage One is the Qualifying Examination (written exam in designated centres across the country) and the Stage two is the TV quiz competition.

Since 2016, Cowbell-Our Milk has decided to bring all its mathematics intervention activities under one umbrella, Cowbellpedia. The top prize was increased to 2 million Nigerian Naira in 2018 so as to celebrate the 20 years anniversary of the Mathematics competition initiative.

Cowbellpedia is an annual mathematics intervention for young students in Nigeria with many touch points. It is approved by the Federal Ministry of Education and endorsed by National Examination Council (NECO), the National Examination body for secondary schools in Nigeria.

After schools must have duly completed their registration on www.cowbellpedia.ng, all the eligible students are expected to write a national qualifying examination, administered by NECO, at designated centers closest to them. The results are released online every 1 June, to commemorate World Milk Day.

From the students that write the examinations annually, the best 108 (54 junior and 54 senior students) converge in Lagos along with their mathematics teachers to attend the quiz show.

== Objectives ==
- To demystify myths about the difficulty in studying and understanding mathematics by identifying and rewarding excellence amongst students, thereby entrenching Cowbell as the brand that delivers the needed ingredient for healthy physical growth and brain development.
- To raise the standard of schools’ education through unbiased engaging tools that would promote sound education, using a holistic platform that is engaging, educative and entertaining.
- To practically demonstrate the symbiotic relationship between Mathematics and Technology, thereby sustaining a keen interest of schools, parents, teachers and other stakeholders, in ensuring good education for their children.

== Cowbellpedia National Qualifying Examination ==
After schools must have duly completed their registration on www.cowbellpedia.ng, all the eligible students are expected to write a national qualifying examination at designated centers closest to them.

The Mathematics Competition is open to students from 10 – 18 years of age who attend full-time Secondary Education in both Public and Private Schools in Nigeria. Entry into this competition is free.

Each school is required to present their best ten students in mathematics (five from JSS3 and five from SSS2), irrespective of gender, religion, tribe or state of origin, to enhance their chances of qualifying for the next stage of the competition.

To encourage the education of girls, mixed schools are asked to nominate a minimum of two girls for each category to represent their school.

Yearly enrollment history
Year	Manual	Online	Total
2019	0	56,073	56,073
2018	0	41,730	41,730
2017	18,922	32,096	51,018
2016	26,051	19,604	45,655
2015	33,269	0	33,269

== TV series ==
From the large number of students that write the examinations annually, the best 108 will converge in Lagos along with their teachers for the ultimate prize of the Best Mathematics student of the year.

Selection Process of the 108 Students for The TV Quiz:

- 17 National Winners + 37 State winners = 54 Students per category

17 National Winners – these students are the top 17 students who have scored the highest marks in the examinations, irrespective of their state of origin.

37 State Winners – these students are selected as state representatives, having scored the highest marks in their states.

The TV series is in three stages:

- Preliminaries – 9 episodes
- Semi Finals – 3 episodes
- Final – 1 episode

After the first season, other episodes were created to add value to the project, such as the Cowbellpedia Teachers’ edition, the documentary insert of the profile of the finalists etc.

Thousands of questions generated by NECO are loaded into the software per season and spread across different categories and syllabus.

The Cowbellpedia series is packaged as 55 Mins to 1hr X 16 episodes, transmitted across Africa on Africa Magic on DSTV, AIT Network and six major stations across key cities, and available globally on YouTube and Facebook.

== Winners ==
Year	Name	Category	Position	School
2025	Adewole Peace Ifemayowa	Junior	1st	Welkin International School, Ogun State
2025	Haruna Salvin	Junior	2nd	The Ambassadors College, Ota, Ogun State
2025	Anyaeji Chukwumeremeze Arthur	Junior	3rd	St. Gregory's College, Ikoyi
2025	Onyema Alexis	Junior	4th	Caleb British International School, Lagos State
2025	Azuike Kenechukwu	Senior	1st	St. Gregory's College, Ikoyi
2025	Adegboye Fopefoluwa	Senior	2nd	The Ambassadors College, Ota, Ogun State
2025	Orji Prince	Senior	3rd	Apt Scholars Universal College, Ogun State
2025	Awhaisoba Lyon	Senior	4th	Apt Scholars Universal College, Ogun State
2023	Adoga Agbo Daniel	Junior	1st	Graceland International School Port Harcourt, Rivers State
2023	Daramola Demilade	Junior	2nd	The Ambassadors College, Ota, Ogun State
2023	Azuike Kenechukwu	Junior	3rd	St. Gregory's College, Ikoyi
2023	Taiwo Tolulope Joy	Junior	4th	The Ambassadors College, Ota, Ogun State
2023	Okechukwu Joseph	Senior	1st	Graceland International School Port Harcourt, Rivers State
2023	Duruji Chimdubem	Senior	2nd	The Ambassadors College, Ota, Ogun State
2023	Ofojindu Pascal	Senior	3rd	Marist Brothers Juniorate, Abia
2023	Edet Clement Eti-Abasi	Senior	4th	Loyola Jesuit College, Abuja
2019	Michael Enehizena	Junior	1st	Scholars Universal Secondary School, Ogun State
2019	Abdulquayum Alli	Junior	2nd	Ota Total Academy, Ogun State
2019	David Charles-Daniel	Junior	3rd	Graceland international School Port Harcourt, Rivers State
2019	Oghenero Ologe	Senior	1st	Zionsfield Private School, Ikorodu, Lagos State
2019	Dabira Akinyemi	Senior	2nd	The Ambassadors College, Ota, Ogun State
2019	Hezekiah Olabisi	Senior	3rd	Bibo Oluwa Academy, Ilesha, Osun State
2018	Akinfoluhan Akinleye	Junior	1st	The Ambassadors College, Ota
2018	Nwankwo Chinemerem Splendour	Junior	2nd	Jesuit Memorial College, Port Harcourt, Rivers State
2018	Okarike Favour	Junior	3rd	Graceland International School, Port Harcourt, Rivers State
2018	Mgbemena Chinedu	Senior	1st	Graceland International School, Port Harcourt, Rivers State
2018	Isinkaye Praise	Senior	2nd	Federal Government Academy Suleja, Niger State
2018	Ekoko Juliet	Senior	3rd	The Ambassadors College, Ota
2017	Jessey Uche-Nwichi	Junior	1st	Graceland International School, Port Harcourt, Rivers State
2017	Oluwafemi Adeyanju	Junior	2nd	Jesuit Memorial College, Port Harcourt, Rivers State
2017	Ezekiel Ekanem	Junior	3rd	Advanced Breed Group of Schools
2017	Munachi Ernest-Eze	Senior	1st	Loyola Jesuit College, Abuja
2017	Oluwanifise Onafowokan	Senior	2nd	The Ambassadors College, Ota
2017	Evans Owamoyo	Senior	3rd	Greater Tomorrow International College
2016	Ekoko Juliet	Junior	1st	The Ambassadors College, Ota
2016	Daniel Oreofe	Junior	2nd	The Ambassadors College, Ota
2016	Okoli Glory	Junior	3rd	The Ambassadors College, Ota
2016	Oguntade Ayoola	Senior	1st	The Ambassadors College, Ota
2016	Adeyemi Taiwo	Senior	2nd	The Ambassadors College, Ota
2016	Udoh Blessing	Senior	3rd	The Ambassadors College, Ota
2015	Munachi Ernest-Eze	Junior	1st	Loyola Jesuit College, Abuja
2015	Ajoke Taiwo	Junior	2nd	Scholars Universal Secondary School
2015	Ayomide Fadipe	Junior	3rd	Loyola Jesuit College, Abuja
2015	Ayodeji Akinkuowo	Senior	1st	Adeyemi Demonstration Secondary School, Ondo State
2015	Titilayo Fasoro-Adewale	Senior	2nd	Hallmark Secondary School, Ondo State
2015	Joshua Mokut	Senior	3rd	Emilis Academy, Calabar

== Touch points ==
=== Cowbellpedia Radio ===
Cowbellpedia Radio is a mathematics radio clinic created for secondary school students to aid their learning ability through teaching and solving math questions sent in by students/teachers via text and electronic platforms.

It is a five-minute math class transmitted thrice weekly, round the year, across ten key radio stations spread across Nigeria.

The program treats math topics and exercises with much opportunity for feedback and interaction.

=== Mobile app ===
Beyond the few weeks of running the project, there came the need to have a constant touch where students can dial-up and improve their math skills, hence the commissioning of the CowbellPedia mobile app initiative.

The Cowbellpedia mobile app is created to encourage students to practice their mathematics skills on their mobile devices.

- Categories: Junior/Senior
- Stages: 13/season
- Levels: 3
- Platforms:
  - Web – www.play.cowbellpedia
  - Android - on Google Play
  - iOS - available on App Store

=== Compendium ===
An up-to-date compilation of all the past questions used on the show (2015–2017) with the correct answers and tutorials, compiled and published for free distribution to secondary school/students across Nigeria.

Over 6,400 Q&A covering all the topics to be published in over three volumes as practice kit for students based on approved curriculum.

Volume 1 print run was 2,000 copies (Junior and Senior) used as incentive for schools during the registration for the Stage 1 Qualifying Examination.

=== Academy ===
This is an initiative specifically created to drive support and interest in math and science among the Nigerian students. This is in collaboration with top-notch foreign universities who were on ground to workshop students and teachers across Nigeria.

All these are geared towards nourishing the dreams of Nigerian children by providing a platform that recognizes and rewards excellence in mathematics, in addition to the quality nutrition that is provided by the Cowbell brand for the nourishment of the Nigerian populace, especially children.

The maiden edition of the initiative took place in three major cities: Lagos, Abuja, and Portharcourt in August 2018 and was facilitated by:

- Professor Bernardo Recamán Santos, a professor of mathematics at The Colegio San Carlos, Columbia.
- Professor Karam Aloui of the Faculty of Sciences of Sfax, Tunisia.

=== Cowbellpedia Milk Of Kindness ===
The Cowbellpedia Milk of Kindness is a special docufeature created as part of the activities to commemorate the 20th Anniversary of the relationship between Cowbell and Math.

The docufeature highlighted the stories of:

- Hamzat Dankanawa, a teacher with Nigerian Tulip International College, Abuja, who has consistently presented qualified students for the project.
- Prince Otunnubi Samson, a teacher with the Federal Government Academy Suleja with over 25 years of experience.
- Munachi Ernest-Eze, of Loyola Jesuit College, Abuja, a two-time Cowbellpedia champion (Junior and Senior categories).

== Teachers edition ==
The Teachers edition of the competition was conceived to mark the World Teachers' Day. Teachers of the 12 finalists in the Junior and Senior categories of the competition partake in the final of the TV recording segment, and the winners are awarded cash and gifts.

Winners of CBP Teachers edition
Year	Name	Category	School
2025	Stephen Egbeyemi	Senior	The Ambassadors College, Ota, Ogun State
2025	Samuel Babayode	Junior	St. Gregory's College, Ikoyi
2023	To be determined	Senior	To be determined
2023	To be determined	Junior	To be determined
2018	Kehinde Oludare	Senior	BiboOluwa Academy, Osun State
2018	Oluwaseun Makinde	Junior	Jesuit Memorial College, Rivers, Port Harcourt
2017	Kolawole Bello	Senior	The Ambassadors College, Ota, Ogun State
2017	Iyanuoluwa Osewa	Junior	The Ambassadors College, Ota, Ogun State
2016	Isaac Oyegbile	Senior	Hallmark Secondary School, Ondo State
2016	Daramola Joseph Oluwaseun	Junior	Dansol High School, Lagos

== Notable winners ==
Munachi Ernest-Eze of Loyola Jesuit College became the first contestant to win the competition in both categoriesn: as a junior student in 2015 and as a senior student in 2017. For this feat, he won a full scholarship to study aerospace engineering at the University of Toronto in Canada and also received education support funds from Promasidor Nigeria.

== See also ==
- List of mathematics competitions
