= Promasidor Nigeria =

Nigerian consumer packaged goods company

Promasidor Nigeria Limited
- Type: Private
- Industry: Consumer packaged goods
- Predecessor: Wonder Foods Nigeria Limited
- Founded: 1993; 33 years ago in Nigeria
- Founder: Robert Rose
- Headquarters: Isolo, Lagos, Nigeria
- Products: Cowbell, Onga
- Parent: Promasidor

Promasidor Nigeria Limited is a consumer packaged goods company headquartered in Isolo, Lagos. It is a subsidiary of South Africa based Promasidor Holdings. The firm's major brands include Cowbell milk, Loya milk, Sunvita cereal, Onga seasoning and Top Tea beverages. The firm introduced the sale of powdered milk in sachets which was later followed by competitors.

The firm is a leading producer of milk in Nigeria.

== History ==
Promasidor Nigeria Limited began operations in Nigeria in March 1993 under the business name of Wonder Foods. Cowbell milk was the first product introduced to the country and it was initially sold at a size similar to the market leader, Peak milk. However, sales generated by the firm's 400 gram powdered milk was not encouraging. To compete with the other milk brands, the firm imported larger packages of milk which are then sold to wholesalers who then scoop the milk from the larger package into smaller polythene bags for resale. This sales and distribution method did get some traction. Thereafter, Cowbell decided to import smaller sachets of milk to target middle and low income earners. This selling strategy increased the firm's revenue. Thereafter, the firm diversified into other sectors such as chocolate drinks, tea and seasonings. In 2010, it recorded an annual turnover of $300 million.

In 2003, the firm changed its business name from Wonder Foods to Promasidor to promote uniformity across the group.

== Brands ==
=== Powdered milk and cocoa beverages ===
The first product introduced to the market by Promasidor then trading under Wonder Foods is Cowbell milk which now stands at its flagship product. It was followed by Loya milk introduced to the market in 2004 and then re-packaged in 2010 and lastly, Miksi. Cowbell is the main revenue driver for Promasidor in the powdered milk market sector, in June 2010, the brand held close to 24% share in market volume, tripling the volume of the Miksi.

The firm also produces cocoa beverages: Cowbell chocolate milk, Miksi chocolate, Amila soft drink, Proma Cafe coffee and Twisco delicious chocolate drinks. These brands compete with Nestle's Milo and Cadbury's Bournvita. Cowbell chocolate was introduced to the market in 2000 and in 2011, it was among the top three cocoa beverage drinks in the country.

=== Seasoning ===
In 2004, the firm introduced Onga powdered seasoning produced in four variations of crayfish, chicken, stew and classic. It was the first powdered seasoning produced in Nigeria. In 2010, the firm launched Onga seasoning cubes.

=== Tea ===
The firm introduced Top Tea with round tea bags in April 1998.

== Marketing ==
In the early years of trading in Nigeria Promasidor used direct marketing strategies, it encouraged its marketing team to wear company uniforms and to reach out to retailers selling from kiosk at residential quarters or beside streets. Flyers were given to the kiosk owners to paste and sales teams were encouraged to develop relationships with the retailers. The company also promoted targeted adverts to young kids who may have not developed brand loyalty to the older bands. To develop new markets for bulkier purchases, the firm went to bakeries, confectioneries and yogurt manufacturers.

The firm also has a history of sponsoring education and youth events such as a yearly math competition began in late 1990s. It also sponsors a yearly mathematics quiz show, Cowbellpedia.
