= Cadbury Nigeria Plc =

Nigerian subsidiary of Mondelez International

Cadbury Nigeria Plc is a food, sweets and drink company headquartered in Lagos, Nigeria, and traded on the Nigerian Stock Exchange. Cadbury Nigeria Plc is a subsidiary of Mondelez International, one of the largest snacking companies in the world. The firm's flagship product is Bournvita and it competes with brands from Nestle, GlaxoSmithKline and Promasidor. They specialised in production and sales of food products. Their activity is organized around 2 families of product: Confectionery and beverages: Bournvita, Tom Tom, Ahomka, Ginger, Hacks and Buttermint brands. Cocoa-based products: cocoa powder, cocoa butter, cocoa liqueur and cocoa cakes.

== Empowerment and initiatives ==
At a media discussion held at the company's headquarters in Lagos on October 5, 2022, Cadbury Nigeria Plc, a subsidiary of Mondelez International and the manufacturer of the renowned cocoa beverage Bournvita, presented outstanding participants of the annual Tech Boot Camp since its commencement. Since the boot camp's launch in 2019, Bournvita has trained more than 1,200 students in keeping with our social objective of promoting literacy by empowering young people to lead with digital skills. The project is in line with the company's initiatives to work with parents to support their children in pursuing their aspirations. Since its start, the boot camp has given Nigerian kids between the ages of 9 and 16 a place to learn and hone their talents in a variety of STEM-related fields, including artificial intelligence, gaming, robotics, and coding. 534 applications were chosen for the Bournvita Tech Bootcamp out of the 8,466 entries submitted for the 2022 session, a 44% increase over the 370 participants in 2021. By spearheading initiatives that encourage young people's scholastic development, Cadbury Nigeria has improved the mental and physical health of Nigerians through its flagship brand, Bournvita. Some of the brand's initiatives to make a positive difference in children's lives across the nation and to encourage them to develop relevant skills and talent for the 21st century include the Bournvita School Program, Bournvita Tech Boot Camp, and Bourn Factor Talent Competition.

== History ==
Cadbury Schweppes history in Nigeria dates back to the 1950s when it began sourcing for cocoa and also importing bulk products and repacking it into tins for sale in the country. Later finding increasing market opportunities in the country, the group set up a manufacturing facility in January 1965.

The firm became a publicly quoted company in 1976 when Cadbury Schweppes sold 20% of its interest in the firm. The firm's investment in the integration of its supply chain led to the establishment of a sorghum conversion plant and Stanmark Industries in Ondo, a cocoa processing plant. Stanmark provides raw materials for its key product, Bournvita and is a source of foreign currency through exportation of cocoa products. In 2006, the subsidiary processed 15,000 tonnes of cocoa beans into cocoa butter, cocoa liquor and cocoa powder.

In 2006, the firm released a statement disclosing financial misstatements in a number of previous annual reports. Immediately after the disclosure, the CEO and finance director resigned their positions. The firm later announced it will be taking exceptional item charges on its balance sheet as a result of the misstatements.

== Brands ==
The firm's major products are Bournvita and Tom Tom. The former was introduced to the country in 1960 and the latter in 1970. Following the establishment of a manufacturing plant in 1965, the firm spent funds on advertising Bournvita, and in the process increased the market share of the brand. Bournvita later became a market leader in its category. To improve nutritional needs, in 1994, the firm included essential vitamins and minerals in Bournvita.

Other products of the company include Cadbury Eclairs, Malta sweets, Trebor and Peppermint original. Beverages contributed 58% of its revenues in 2018 and sweets contributed 26%. In addition, it markets Creme Rollers, Chocki, Hall Take 5 and Bubba Gum.

In 2022 financial year, Cadbury Nigeria reports 110% increase in profit after tax from N449.712 million achieved a year ago to N946.093 million.
