= Gidi Culture Festival =

Recurring event in Nigeria

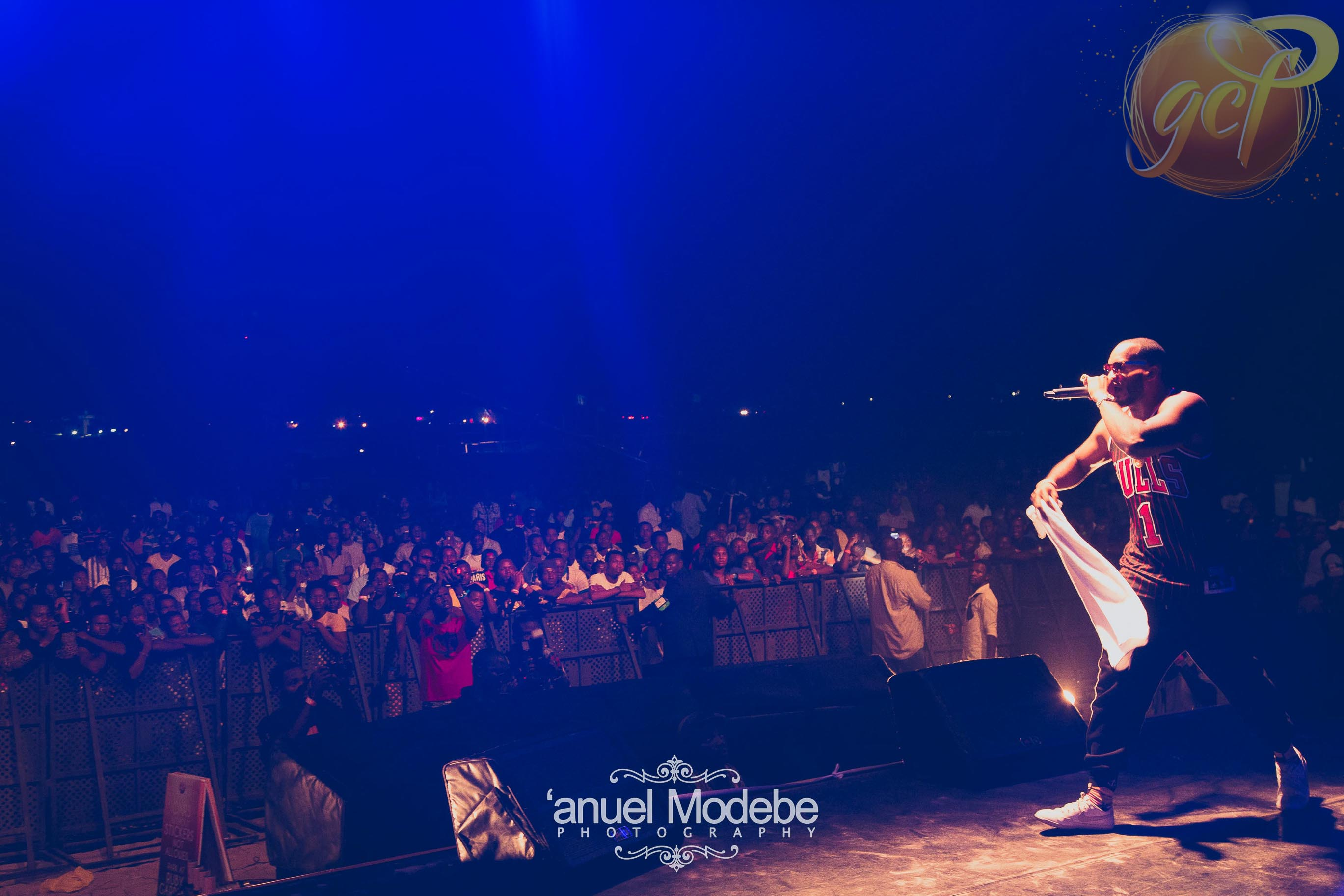
- Gidi Culture Festival 2014
- Status: Active
- Date: Easter weekend
- Frequency: Annual
- Location: Lagos, Nigeria
- Country: Nigeria
- Years active: 2014–present
- Founder: Chinedu Okeke and Oriteme Banigo
- Website: www.gidiculturefestival.com

The Gidi Culture Festival (often dubbed Coachella in Lagos) is an annual one-day music and arts festival that takes place in Lagos, Nigeria. Co-founded by Chinedu Okeke and Oriteme Banigo, it was created in response to a demand from the local youth culture for live, affordable, and accessible entertainment in Africa. The festival provides a venue for live bands, DJs, and musical acts to perform. It also features outdoor activities, local vendors, and artisans. The main show features a line-up of African acts from numerous countries, including Nigeria, Ghana, South Africa, Congo, Kenya, and the United Kingdom. The goal of the festival is to encourage the development of African talent and promote artists both within the continent and into overseas markets.

== History ==
The Gidi Culture Festival is produced by Eclipse Live Production. It was inspired by the now defunct Lekki Sound Splash, a festival once headlined by Fela Kuti. Co-founded by Chinedu Okeke and Oriteme Banigo, the festival's main aim is to create a safe space for the youth that would enable and empower them. The festival has been noted for its novel ideas about giving back to the community. Its Beach Sweeps and Dreams Project are exchange programs that create opportunities for young people to work in a variety of different creative industries. In addition to the Gidi Culture Festival, Eclipse Live Production produces Nigeria's Palmwine Music Fest and Nativeland. In an interview with IQ magazine in 2018, Okeke said the Gidi Culture Festival is yet to break even, although he is optimistic that it will do so in a couple of years.

=== 2014: Inaugural edition ===
The inaugural edition of the festival featured performances from Ice Prince, Phyno, Naeto C, Chidinma, Dammy Krane, Blink, Poe, Boj, Teezee, Ayo Jay, Emma Nyra, Patoranking, Lynxx, Jesse Jagz, Oritse Femi, Orezi, Reminisce, Efya, DJ Obi, DJ Caise, DJ Hazan, DJ Cuppy, DJ Kaywise, Falz, Pucado, Yung L, and Endia.

=== 2015: Second edition ===
The second edition of the festival was held on April 4, 2015, at Eko Atlantic in Lagos. It featured performances from M.I Abaga, Show Dem Camp, Waje, Yemi Alade, Falz, EL, Victoria Kimani, Urban Boyz, Awilo Longomba, Temi Dollface, Ebisan and Sauti Sol. It also featured DJ Neptune, DJ Lambo and DJ Gino Brown.

=== 2016: Third edition ===
The third edition of the festival was held at Eko Atlantic in Lagos. Hosted by Sensei Uche and Nomuzi, it featured performances from Tiwa Savage, D'banj, Phyno, Small Doctor, Timaya, Adekunle Gold, Yemi Alade, K.O, Riky Rick, Mr 2Kay, Base One, Que Peller, Dice Ailes, Poe, Funbi and Saeon.

=== 2017: Fourth edition ===
The fourth edition of the festival was held on April 15, 2017. It was headlined by Diplo, Burna Boy and Davido. The festival featured additional performances from Seyi Shay, Reekado Banks, Simi, Niniola, Sauti Sol, and Vanessa Mdee.

=== 2018: Fifth edition ===
The fifth edition of the festival featured performances from Wizkid, 2Baba, Brymo, Adekunle Gold, Maleek Berry, DJ Spinall and Tiwa Savage, along with live sets newcomers Odunsi the Engine, Tay Iwar and Lady Donli. In addition to the main stage, the festival's organizers introduced a second stage called the Next Generation stage. Before the show started, the configuration on the soundboard switched, resulting in the show being delayed for an hour. A record attendance of 8,000 people attended the festival. The organizers used their own ticketing platform, Seagate, to sell over 3,000 tickets in pre-sales.

=== 2019: Sixth edition ===
The sixth edition of the festival was held on April 20, 2019, at the Landmark Beach Front in Victoria Island, Lagos. The festival featured performances from Patoranking, Niniola, Teni, Moonchild, Sanelly, DJ Neptune, Wande Coal, DJ Cuppy, Sarz, Zlatan, Blaqbonez, and L.A.X. It was estimated that over 10,000 people attended the festival.

2020: Seventh edition

The seventh edition of the annual event which is usually held during the Easter celebration was postponed to October 2020. It was then cancelled due to the coronavirus outbreak.
