= Nestle Nigeria =

Food and beverage specialty company

Nestlé Nigeria Plc
- Type: Plc
- Industry: Food processing
- Founded: 1961; 65 years ago (Nestle Products Nigeria)
- Headquarters: Agbara
- Key people: Maurico Alarcon Jagdish Singla
- Products: Baby food, coffee, dairy products, breakfast cereals, confectionery, bottled water
- Revenue: N244 billion
- Net income: N33.7 billion (2017)
- Number of employees: 2,201
- Parent: Nestlé
- Website: https://www.nestle-cwa.com

Nestle Nigeria Plc is a publicly listed food and beverage specialty company headquartered in Lagos. It's mostly owned by a holding company based in Switzerland and have ties to the company Tolaram Group. The company was founded in 1961 and conducted trading under the name of Nestle Products Nigeria Limited. It has its main factory in Agbara Industrial Estate, Ogun State. The firm manufactures breakfast cereal, baby food products, food seasoning and hydrolyzed plant protein mix.

The firm was listed as one of the largest 100 companies in Africa by Africa Business magazine.

== History ==
The company began business under the trade name of Nestle Products Nigeria, in 1969, the name was changed to Food Specialties Limited. It began trading on the Nigerian Stock Exchange in 1979 following an indigenization promotion decree. In 1991, the company's name was changed to Nestle Foods Nigeria, and ten years later it became Nestle Nigeria PLC. At its inception, the firm's operation was in the distribution and sales of Nestle products which had previously been imported into the country by merchants. In 1971, improved demand for its Maggi seasoning product led to the establishment of a packaging plant in Lagos. The firm leased land at the newly created Agbara Estate in 1978 and three years later began manufacturing Maggi and Milo products. In 1982, Nestle began producing Cerelac in Nigeria at Agbara. Between 1984 and 1986, the company introduced baby-weaning products with higher local content, these include Cerelac Maize and Nutrend, with a mixture of soy and maize. It later introduced Chocomilo, a confectionery item. In 2011, the firm expanded production of its marquee with the opening of a Maggi factory in Flowergate, Ogun State. Nestle Waters Nigeria inaugurated a community water facility to ensure safe and healthy drinking water in the Magedari suburb area of Abuja which was part of Nestle's effort to ensure healthy hydration.

As part of the efforts to create water conservation and proper hydration, the Marketing Manager, Nestle, Mrs . Gloria Nwabuike, said they have trained over 800 students, and 300 teachers in 140 schools in Lagos, Ogun, Osun states as well as in the Federal Capital Territory.

=== Marketing and distribution ===
Nestle Nigeria has sponsored the Maggi national cooking competition and previously sponsored a Maggi cooking show. It also sponsored sports competition through it Milo brand.

The firm has two factories in Ogun State and a distribution center at Ota. Brands of Nestle such as Cerelac, Milo, Maggi cube have gained household name status.

== Brands ==
=== Food and cereal ===
- Cerelac
- Nutrend
- Golden Morn
- NAN
- Lactogen

=== Beverage ===
- Chocomilo
- Milo
- NIDO
- Nescafe
- Purelife water

=== Seasoning ===
- Maggi
