= Iyanya discography =

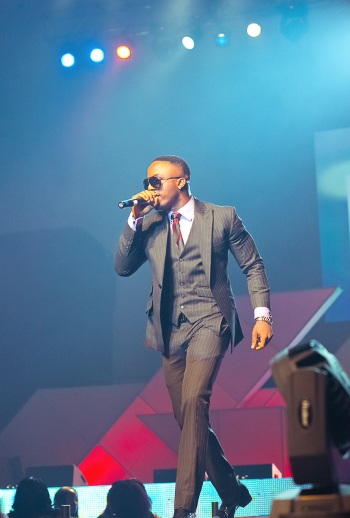
- Studio albums: 4
- EPs: 5
- Compilation albums: 1
- Singles: 96
- Music videos: 35
- Promotional singles: 5

The discography of Iyanya consists of four studio albums, four extended plays (EPs), one compilation album, ninety-six singles (including forty-three as featured artist), five promotional singles, and thirty-five music videos. Iyanya rose to fame in 2008 after winning the first season of Project Fame West Africa. The following year, he released his debut studio album My Story, which was supported by the singles "No Time" and "Love Truly". In 2011, he co-founded the record label Made Men Music Group alongside Ubi Franklin. His second studio album Desire was released in 2013 and produced hit singles such as "Kukere", "Ur Waist", "Flavour", "Sexy Mama", and "Jombolo", while featuring collaborations with M.I, Wizkid, Tiwa Savage, D'banj, and others. Desire earned nominations for Album of the Year and Best R&B/Pop Album at The Headies 2013. His third album Applaudise arrived in 2015, featuring artists like Don Jazzy, Banky W., Olamide, and Patoranking, and was nominated for Album of the Year at the 2016 Nigeria Entertainment Awards. Iyanya later signed to Mavin Records and released the Signature EP in 2017, followed by several other EPs including For Your Love (2020), The 6th Wave (2022), Love & Trust (2023), and 888 (Abundance, Success and Achievement) (2024).

== Studio albums ==
Title	Album details
My Story	Released: 2009; Label: CN Media; Format: CD, digital download
Desire	Released: 6 February 2013; Label: Made Men Music Group; Format: CD, digital download
Applaudise	Released: 19 September 2015; Label: Made Men Music Group; Format: CD, digital download
Once Upon A Cat	Released: 7 February 2024; Label: Made Men Music Group; Format: CD, digital download

== Extended plays ==
Title	Album details
Signature	Released: 29 March 2017; Label: Mavin; Format: Digital download
For Your Love	Released: 20 February 2020; Label: Violet 360 Music; Format: Streaming, digital download
The 6th Wave	Released: 21 October 2022; Label: Made Men Music Group; Format: Streaming, digital download
Love & Trust	Released: 8 June 2023; Label: Made Men Music Group; Format: Streaming, digital download
888 (Abundance, Success and Achievement)	Released: 15 November 2024; Label: Made Men Music Group; Format: Streaming, digital download

== Compilation albums ==
Title	Album details
The Evolution	Released: 29 May 2014; Label: Made Men Music Group; Format: CD, digital download

== Singles ==
=== As lead artist ===
List of singles as lead artist, showing year released and album name
Title	Year	Album
"No Time" (featuring Faze)	2009	My Story
"Love Truly"	2009	My Story
"Iyanya (My Story)"	2009	My Story
"Kukere"	2011	Desire
"Ur Waist" (featuring Emma Nyra)	2012	Desire
"Kukere Remix" (featuring D'banj)	2012	Desire
"Flavour"	2012	Desire
"Sexy Mama" (featuring Wizkid)	2013	Desire
"Jombolo" (featuring Flavour)	2013	Desire
"Head Swell"	2013	Non-album single
"Chineke Is Involved"	2013	Non-album single
"She Can Get It"	2013	Non-album single
"Le Kwa Ukwu"	2013	Non-album single
"Away"	2014	Non-album single
"Angelina" (with Baci)	2014	The Evolution
"Say Yeah" (with Emma Nyra, Tekno, Selebobo, and Baci)	2014	The Evolution
"Story Story" (featuring Oritse Femi)	2014	Non-album single
"Mr Oreo"	2014	Applaudise
"Finito"	2014	Non-album single
"Gift" (featuring Don Jazzy)	2015	Applaudise
"Nakupenda" (featuring Diamond Platnumz)	2015	Applaudise
"Yudala" (with Tekno, Selebobo, Baci, and Mystro)	2015	Non-album single
"Applaudise"	2015	Applaudise
"Mama Oyoyo" (with Yemi Alade, Olamide, Tekno, and Selebobo)	2016	Non-album singles
"Fever" (featuring DJ Arafat and Xcellente)	2016	Non-album singles
"Type of Woman"	2016	Non-album singles
"Heart Beat"	2016	Non-album singles
"Ayaya" (featuring Ikpa Udo and Upper X)	2016	Non-album single
"Yoga" (featuring Victoria Kimani)	2016	Applaudise
"Up to Something" (featuring Don Jazzy and Dr Sid)	2016	Signature
"Hold On"	2017	Signature
"Iyanu (Holy Water)"	2017	Non-album singles
"Good Vibes" (featuring Team Salut)	2018	Non-album singles
"Biko"	2018	Non-album singles
"Calabar Carnival Anthem"	2018	Non-album singles
"No Drama"	2018	Non-album singles
"Halle" (featuring Duncan Mighty)	2019	Non-album singles
"Ijeoma" (featuring Peruzzi)	2019	Non-album singles
"Fever"	2020	Non-album singles
"No Where" (featuring DJ Tarico, Nelson Tivane, and Preck)	2021	Non-album singles
"Over" (with Meaku)	2021	Non-album singles
"Change Am" (featuring Wande Coal)	2021	Non-album singles
"Call" (featuring Ayra Starr)	2022	The 6th Wave
"Like" (featuring Kizz Daniel and Davido)	2022	The 6th Wave
"One Side"	2022	The 6th Wave
"One Side (Remix)" (featuring Mayorkun and Tekno)	2023	Non-album single
"Plans"	2023	Love & Trust
"Sinner" (featuring Bnxn)	2023	Love & Trust
"Away"	2023	Non-album singles
"Outside" (featuring Berri-Tiga)	2023	Non-album singles
"Fashion Killer" (featuring Rayvanny and Zii Beats)	2024	Non-album singles
"Shagara" (featuring Tekno)	2024	888 (Abundance, Success and Achievement)
"Yebo!"	2025	Non-album single
"Work"	2026	Non-album single

=== As featured artist ===
List of singles as featured artist, showing year released and album name
Title	Year	Album
"Get Wild" (N6 featuring Iyanya)	2012	BiznessB4Pleasure
"Everything I Do" (Emma Nyra featuring Iyanya)	2012	Non-album singles
"Omoge" (Slim Joe featuring Iyanya)	2012	Non-album singles
"Koma Roll Remix" (Tillaman featuring Ice Prince, Iyanya, Burna Boy, Phyno and Trigga)	2013	Non-album singles
"Coupe Decale Remix" (Minjin featuring Iyanya)	2013	Non-album singles
"Emujo" (DJ Jimmy Jatt featuring Iyanya and 4×4)	2013	The Industry, Vol. 1
"Fi Mi Le" (Lola Rae featuring Iyanya)	2013	Non-album singles
"Felele" (Ajemina featuring Iyanya)	2013	Non-album singles
"Your Desire" (Sammy Lee featuring Iyanya)	2013	Non-album singles
"Feel Alright" (Wizboyy featuring Iyanya)	2013	Testimoney
"Ride Out" (Angel featuring Iyanya)	2013	Non-album singles
"Loyalist" (DJ Kaywise featuring Iyanya)	2013	Non-album singles
"Mambo" (Sexy Steel featuring Iyanya)	2013	Non-album singles
"Weather" (Stormrex featuring Iyanya)	2014	Freedom
"Commander" (T-Obay featuring Iyanya)	2014	Non-album singles
"Amber Rose" (Mr Chidoo featuring Iyanya)	2014	Non-album singles
"Good Looking" (King Josh featuring Iyanya)	2014	Non-album singles
"Lepeleme" (Rundatrax featuring Iyanya)	2014	Non-album singles
"Ekomo" (EffJay featuring Iyanya)	2014	Non-album singles
"Vanilla" (LK Kuddy featuring Iyanya)	2014	Non-album singles
"Bum Bum" (Diamond Platnumz featuring Iyanya)	2014	Non-album singles
"Tayali" (Urban Boyz featuring Iyanya)	2014	Non-album singles
"My Lane" (Bayoz Muzik featuring Iyanya and Emma Nyra)	2014	Non-album singles
"Sura Yako (Remix)" (Sauti Sol featuring Iyanya)	2014	Non-album singles
"Pretty Girls" (DIL featuring Iyanya)	2014	Non-album singles
"Feel It (Africa)" (Kcee featuring Harrysong and Iyanya)	2015	Non-album single
"Twist & Shake" (Flowssick featuring Iyanya)	2015	Non-album single
"Nwayo Nwayo (Remix)" (Sefiya featuring Iyanya)	2015	Non-album single
"Chukwudi" (Joe EL featuring Iyanya)	2015	Timeless
"Reggae Blues" (Harrysong featuring Olamide, Iyanya, Kcee, and Orezi)	2015	Non-album singles
"Biliwo" (Slim Joe featuring Iyanya)	2015	Non-album singles
"Right Now (Remix)" (Seyi Shay featuring Banky W and Iyanya)	2015	Seyi or Shay
"High (Remix)" (Shaydee featuring A-Pass and Iyanya)	2015	Rhythm and Life
"Be Mine" (D'Tunes featuring Sean Tizzle and Iyanya)	2015	Non-album singles
"Nothing Mega" / "Sukumma" (D'Tunes featuring Iyanya)		Non-album singles
"Mama Oyoyo" (Premium Music featuring Yemi Alade, Iyanya, Olamide, Tekno, and Selebobo)	2016	Non-album single
"Flex" (Princeton featuring Iyanya)	2016	Non-album single
"Wette" (Faze featuring Iyanya)	2016	Non-album single
"Mana Style" (Blackah featuring Iyanya and Yung L)	2016	Non-album single
"Fantasy (Remix)" (Dice Ailes featuring Iyanya)	2016	Non-album single
"Police" (Da Prinze Usifoh featuring Harrysong and Iyanya)	2016	Non-album single
"My Way" (DJ Coublon featuring Iyanya)	2017	Non-album single
"Go" (Kcee featuring Iyanya)	2022	Non-album single

== Promotional singles ==
List of promotional singles
Title	Year	Album
"I'm the One"	2010	Non-album singles
"In Love Again"	2010	Non-album singles
"South South Girl" (featuring Duncan Mighty)	2011	Non-album singles
"High" (featuring Dammy Krane)	2013	Non-album singles
"Take It Inside" (Olamide featuring Iyanya)	2013	Non-album singles

== Music videos ==
=== As lead artist ===
List of music videos as lead artist, showing date released and directors
Title	Video release date	Director(s)	Ref.
"Plans"	12 August 2023	Ochuko Lagos	
"Love and Trust" (featuring Joeboy)	24 June 2023	Ochuko Lagos	
"Sinner" (featuring Bnxn)	4 May 2023	Ochuko Lagos	
"One Side (Remix)" (featuring Mayorkun and Tekno)	23 February 2023	Olu The Wave	
"One Side"	13 October 2022	Olu The Wave	
"Like" (featuring Davido and Kizz Daniel)	15 July 2022	Olu The Wave	
"Call" (featuring Ayra Starr)	23 March 2022	Olu The Wave	
"No Where" (featuring Yaba Buluku Boyz)	25 November 2021	TG Omori	
"Fever"	28 March 2020	7th Floor Views	
"No Drama"	15 December 2018	Henry Emehel	
"Iyanu (Holy Water)"	14 November 2017	Omar	
"Not Forgotten" (featuring Poe)	29 September 2017	Ogo Okpue	
"Bow For You"	8 September 2017	Ogo Okpue	
"Hold On"	16 June 2017	Ogo Okpue	
"Up to Something" (featuring Don Jazzy and Dr Sid)	15 December 2016	Gyo Gyimah	
"Heart Beat"	3 June 2016	Prince Meyson	
"Type of Woman"	6 April 2016	Mega Boi	
"Okamfor" (featuring Lil Kesh)	19 September 2015	Aje Filmworks	
"Applaudise"	13 July 2015	Aje Filmworks	
"Nakupenda" (featuring Diamond Platnumz)	1 June 2015	Patrick Elis	
"Yudala" (with Tekno, Selebobo, Mystro, and Baci)	15 April 2015	Patrick Elis	
"Freestyle" (with Ice Prince)	10 April 2015	Genesis Lanre Lawanson	
"Gift" (featuring Don Jazzy)	6 March 2015	Uncredited	
"Finito"	3 November 2014	TeeKay	
"Mr Oreo"	23 September 2014	Mega Boi	
"Away"	18 April 2014	Sesan	
"Le Kwa Ukwu"	12 November 2013	Sesan	
"Head Swell"	1 August 2013	Mr. Moe Musa	
"Jombolo" (featuring Flavour N'abania)	12 June 2013	Sesan	
"Sexy Mama" (featuring Wizkid)	26 April 2013	Sesan	
"Flavour"	24 December 2012	Mr Moe Musa	
"Ur Waist" (featuring Emma Nyra)	14 September 2012	Clarence Peters	
"Kukere"	24 March 2012	Patrick Ellis	
"Iyanya (My Story)"	7 March 2010	Uncredited	
"Love Truly"	10 July 2009	Uncredited	

=== As featured artist ===
List of music videos as featured artist, showing date released and directors
Title	Video release date	Director(s)	Ref
"Bella" (DJ Lambo featuring Lady Donli and Iyanya)	29 January 2021	Cardoso	
"Mana Style" (Blackah featuring Yung L and Iyanya)	2 June 2016	Paul Gambit	
"Wette" (Faze featuring Iyanya)	28 April 2016	Aje Filmworks	
"Mama Oyoyo" (Premium Music featuring Yemi Alade, Iyanya, Tekno, Olamide, and Selebobo)	12 February 2016	Clarence Peters	
"Chukwudi" (Joe EL featuring Iyanya)	28 September 2015	Clarence Peters	
"Reggae Blues" (Harrysong featuring Olamide, Kcee, Iyanya, and Orezi)	7 August 2015	Adasa Cookey	
"Nwayo Nwayo (Remix)" (Sefiya featuring Iyanya)	14 July 2015	DUKS Arts	
"Feel It" (Kcee featuring Harrysong and Iyanya)	15 March 2015	Uncredited	
"Pretty Girls" (DIL featuring Iyanya)	12 December 2014	Paul Gambit	
"Sura Yako (Remix)" (Sauti Sol featuring Iyanya)	19 September 2014	Enos Olik & Bokeh Family	
"Your Desire" (Sammylee featuring Iyanya)	19 September 2014	Mattmax	
"Vanilla" (LK Kuddy featuring Iyanya)	3 September 2014	Mattmax	
"Tayali" (Urban Boyz featuring Iyanya)	8 July 2014	Patrick Elis	
"Bum Bum" (Diamond Platnumz featuring Iyanya)	7 July 2014	Mr. Moe Musa	
"Say Yeah" (TripleMG featuring Iyanya, Emma Nyra, Tekno, Selebobo, and Baci)	2 July 2014	Mattmax	
"Ekomo" (EffJay featuring Iyanya)	29 May 2014	Patrick Elis	
"Commander" (T-Obay featuring Iyanya)	25 May 2014	Clarence Peters	
"Fi Mi Le" (Lola Rae featuring Iyanya)	1 May 2014	Tatenda Jamera	
"Loyalist" (DJ Kaywise featuring Iyanya)	1 May 2014	Paul Gambit	
"Good Looking" (King Josh featuring Iyanya)	19 April 2014	Uncredited	
"Mambo" (Sexy Steel featuring Iyanya)	19 February 2014	Patrick Elis	
"Felele" (Ajemina featuring Iyanya)	17 June 2013	Don P Films	
"Coupe Decale Remix" (Minjin featuring Iyanya)	12 June 2013	Unlimited LA	
"Koma Roll Remix" (Tillaman featuring Ice Prince, Iyanya, Burna Boy, Phyno and Trigga)	2 May 2013	Patrick Elis	
"Everything I Do" (Emma Nyra featuring Iyanya)	25 March 2013	Mr Moe Musa	
"Get Wild" (N6 featuring Iyanya)	3 March 2013	Lanre Tyson	
