= D'Tunes =

- Born: Adesanya Doyinsola; 13 October 1990 (age 36)
- Origin: Nigeria
- Genres: Pop music, R&B, Afro pop music, African hip hop
- Occupations: Record producer, entrepreneur, songwriter
- Years active: 2011–present
- Label: Difference Entertainment

Adesanya Doyinsola, better known as D'Tunes, is a Nigerian music producer who is CEO of Difference Entertainment. He was affiliated with Made Men Music Group. He is known for producing for Iyanya and Sean Tizzle and their singles "Kukere" and "Sho Lee" respectively. He won Producer of the Year at The Headies 2013. He is known for producing songs like "Kukere", "Ur Waist", "Sexy Mama" with Wizkid, "Jombolo" with Flavour, and for Iyanya off his sophomore album Desire (2013), alongside "Sho Lee", "Mama Eh", "Perfect Gentleman", "Loke Loke" with 9ice, and many more for Sean Tizzle off his debut album The Journey (2014).

D'Tunes has also produced for Mr Eazi, Yemi Alade, Reminisce, 9ice, Mayorkun, Teni and CDQ. He was nominated in the Music Producer of the Year category at the Nigeria Entertainment Awards 2014.

== Early life and career ==
Doyinsola started in music from the church by learning how to play the drums and keyboard. He studied in Olabisi Onabanjo University until he dropped out of school in 2009. He started developing interest in production of songs after he wrote his UTME and was awaiting admission and became more interested in producing than school so he had to drop out.

== Production discography ==
=== Singles ===
Official single by "D'Tunes"

Title	Year
"Oh" (featuring. EFA, YQ & Tony Totch)	2011
"Thank The Lord" (featuring. Yemi Alade & Sean Tizzle)	2011
"Be Mine" (featuring. Iyanya & Sean Tizzle)	2015
"Ogogoro" (featuring. Yonda & Wale Turner)	2017

=== Singles produced ===
Title	Year	Album	Release date
"Kukere" (Iyanya)	2012	Desire	6 February 2013
"Ur Waist" (Iyanya (featuring. Emma Nyra)	2012	Desire	6 February 2013
"Flavor" (Iyanya)	2012	Desire	6 February 2013
"Sexy Mama" (Iyanya (featuring. Wizkid)	2012	Desire	6 February 2013
"Sho Lee" (Sean Tizzle)	2013	-	-
"Mama Eh" (Sean Tizzle)	2013	"The Journey"	17 April 2014
"Komole" (Sean Tizzle)	2013	"The Journey"	17 April 2014
"Kilogbe" (Sean Tizzle)	2013	"The Journey"	17 April 2014
"Rara" (Sean Tizzle)	2014	-	-
"Abiamo" (Sean Tizzle)	2015	-	-

=== Albums produced ===
Title	Year	Release date
"Desire" (Iyanya)	2013	6 February 2013
"The Journey" (Sean Tizzle)	2014	17 April 2014

== Difference Entertainment ==
Difference Entertainment was founded by D'Tunes in 2013.

=== Artists ===
Artists signed to Difference Entertainment

Act	Year signed
Sean Tizzle	2013
BadBoy Ace	2015
Qdot	2015
Kue Bounce	2015
ATM	2015

== Awards ==
Year	Awards ceremony	Award description(s)	Results
2013	The Headies	Producer of the Year	Won
2013	The Future Awards	Producer of the Year	Nominated
2014	Nigeria Entertainment Awards	Music Producer Of The Year	Nominated
2014	The Headies	Music Producer Of The Year	Nominated
2015	City People Awards	Music Producer Of The Year	Nominated
