= The Headies Award for Song of the Year =

Nigerian music award

- Awarded for: Most popular song in the year under review
- Country: Nigeria
- Presented by: Hip Hop World Magazine
- First award: 2006
- Final award: 2019
- Currently held by: Asake – "Lonely at the Top" (2024)
- Website: theheadies.com

The Headies Award for Song of the Year is an award presented at The Headies, a ceremony that was established in 2006 and originally called the Hip Hop World Awards. (Note: The nominees for the 2006 edition are not included in the Recipients table because they are not available.) It was first awarded to P-Square's "Bizzy Body" in 2006, and is currently being held by Asake's "Lonely at the Top".

== Recipients ==
Song of the Year
Year	Nominees	Result
2024	"Lonely at the Top" by Asake	Won
2024	"Showa" by Kizz Daniel	Nominated
2024	"Commas" by Ayra Starr	Nominated
2024	"Egwu" by Chike and MohBad	Nominated
2024	"Remember" by Asake	Nominated
2024	"Ogechi" (Remix) by Hyce, BoyPee, & Brown Joel (featuring Davido)	Nominated
2023	"Last Last by Burna Boy	Won
2023	"Calm Down" by Rema	Nominated
2023	"Ku Lo Sa" by Oxlade	Nominated
2023	"Buga" by Kizz Daniel (featuring Tekno)	Nominated
2023	"Finesse" by Pheelz featuring Bnxn	Nominated
2023	"Sungba" (Remix) by Asake (featuring Burna Boy)	Nominated
2022	"Essence" by Wizkid (featuring Tems)	Won
2022	"Celebrate Me" by Patoranking	Nominated
2022	"Doings" by Flavour (featuring Phyno)	Nominated
2022	"High" by Adekunle Gold (featuring Davido)	Nominated
2022	"Monsalisa" by Lojay and Sarz	Nominated
2022	"Peru" by Fireboy DML	Nominated
2020	"Nobody" by DJ Neptune (featuring Joeboy and Mr Eazi)	Won
2020	"Fem" by Davido	Nominated
2020	"Joro" by Wizkid	Nominated
2020	"Mafo" by Naira Marley	Nominated
2020	"Duduke" by Simi	Nominated
2019	"Ye" by Burna Boy	Won
2019	"Dumebi" by Rema	Nominated
2019	"Wetin We Gain" by Victor AD	Nominated
2019	"Fake Love" by Starboy (featuring Duncan Mighty and Wizkid)	Nominated
2019	"Case" by Teni	Nominated
2019	"Zanku (Legwork)" by Zlatan	Nominated
2019	"Baby" by Joeboy	Nominated
2019	"Jealous" by Fireboy DML	Nominated
2018	"If" by Davido	Won
2018	"Penalty" by Small Doctor	Nominated
2018	"Wo" by Olamide	Nominated
2018	"Yeba" by Kiss Daniel	Nominated
2018	"Mad Over You" by Runtown	Nominated
2018	"FIA" by Davido	Nominated
2016	"Fada Fada" by Phyno (featuring Olamide)	Won
2016	"Osinachi" by Humblesmith (featuring Davido)	Nominated
2016	"Pick Up" by Adekunle Gold	Nominated
2016	"Reggae Blues" by Harrysong (featuring Orezi, Iyanya, Olamide, and Kcee)	Nominated
2016	"Final (Baba Nla)" by Wizkid	Nominated
2015	"Ojuelegba" by Wizkid	Won
2015	"Godwin" by Korede Bello	Nominated
2015	"Bobo" by Olamide	Nominated
2015	"Woju" by Kiss Daniel	Nominated
2014	"Aye" by Davido	Won
2014	"Double Wahala" by Oritse Femi	Nominated
2014	"Surulere" by Dr SID (featuring Don Jazzy)	Nominated
2014	"Dorobucci" by The Mavins	Nominated
2014	"Johnny" by Yemi Alade	Nominated
2013	"Limpopo" by Kcee	Won
2013	"Durosoke" by Olamide	Nominated
2013	"Ur Waist" by Iyanya	Nominated
2013	"Alingo" by P-Square	Nominated
2013	"Sho Lee" by Sean Tizzle	Nominated
2012	"Oliver Twist" by D'banj	Won
2012	"Chop My Money" by P-Square (featuring Akon and May D)	Nominated
2012	"Dami Duro" by Davido	Nominated
2012	"Gaga Crazy" by Chuddy K	Nominated
2012	"Kukere" by Iyanya	Nominated
2011	"Oleku" by Ice Prince (featuring Brymo)	Won
2011	"Only Me" by 2Face Idibia	Nominated
2011	"Give It To Me" by D'Prince (featuring D'banj)	Nominated
2011	"Pop Something" by Dr SID (featuring D'banj)	Nominated
2011	"Fimile" by Kas	Nominated
2010	"Yori Yori" by Bracket	Won
2010	"Kokoroko" by Kefee (featuring Timaya)	Nominated
2010	"You Bad" by Wande Coal (featuring D'banj)	Nominated
2010	"Free Madness Pt.2" by Terry G	Nominated
2010	"Alanta" by Art Quake	Nominated
2009	"Gongo Aso" by 9ice	Won
2009	"Fall in Love" by D'banj	Nominated
2009	"Incase U Never Know" by 2Shotz (featuring Timaya)	Nominated
2009	"Good or Bad" by J. Martins (featuring Timaya and P-Square)	Nominated
2008	"Yahooze" by Olu Maintain	Won
2008	"Do Me" by P-Square	Nominated
2008	"See Me So" by 2Face Idibia	Nominated
2008	"Kolomental" by Faze	Nominated
2008	"Stylee" by DJ Jimmy Jatt (featuring 2face Idibia, Elajoe & Mode 9)	Nominated
2007	"Why Me" by D'banj	Won
2007	"Angel of My Life" by Paul Play	Nominated
2007	"Obodo" - Mr Raw (feat Klint da Drunk)	Nominated
2007	"Imagine That" by Styl-Plus	Nominated
2007	"Baby Konga" by Konga	Nominated
2007	"For Instance" by 2Face Idibia	Nominated
2007	"Olori Oko" by Infinity	Nominated
2007	"Shake Something" by Jazzman Olofin	Nominated
2006	"Bizzy Body" by P-Square	Won

== Category records ==
Most wins

Rank	1st	2nd
Artist	D'banj; Davido	P-Square; Olu Maintain; 9ice Bracket; Ice Prince; Wizkid; Kcee; Phyno; Burna Boy
Total wins	2 Wins	1 win

Most nominations

Rank	1st	2nd	3rd
Artist	P-Square; Davido	2face Idibia; D'banj; Olamide	Wizkid; Kiss Daniel; Dr SID
Total noms	4 nominations	3 nominations	2 nominations
