= The Journey (Sean Tizzle album) =

Studio album by Sean Tizzle
- Released: April 17, 2014
- Recorded: 2013 – November 16, 2013
- Genre: Afrobeats; highlife
- Length: 72:26
- Label: Difference Entertainment
- Producer: D'Tunes; Prince Boom

Sean Tizzle chronology
The Journey (2014)	Moving Forward Vol. 1 (2017)

Singles from The Journey
- 1. "Mama Eh" Released: July 5, 2013; 2. "Kilogbe" Released: October 16, 2013; 3. "Komole" Released: October 31, 2013; 4. "Kilogbe (Remix)" Released: April 17, 2014

The Journey is the debut studio album by Nigerian afropop artist Sean Tizzle. It was released on April 17, 2014 on Difference Entertainment. With production handled mostly by D'Tunes, the album features guest appearances from Olamide, Reminisce, 9ice, Ice Prince, Naeto C, Kcee and Tiwa Savage. It was supported by four official singles—"Mama Eh", "Komole", "Kilogbe", and its remix. The Journey won Best R&B/Pop Album at The Headies 2014 and was nominated for Album of the Year. At the same event, Sean Tizzle earned the Hip Hop World Revelation of the Year award for the album. It received a nomination at the 2014 Nigeria Entertainment Awards for Best Album of the Year.

== Background ==
Sean Tizzle, born Oluwaseun Morihanfen, was first affiliated with Sound Sultan's Naija Ninjas outfit, but later left and signed with Difference Entertainment, a label founded by producer D'Tunes after his departure from Made Men Music Group. Sean Tizzle had risen to prominence in 2013 with the single "Sho Lee", which became one of the year's most popular songs. D'Tunes, who had become one of Nigeria's most in-demand producers in 2012 and 2013, established Difference Entertainment and made Sean Tizzle its first signing. Within a year of "Sho Lee"'s release, Sean Tizzle had won a The Headies award and begun preparing The Journey.

== Composition ==
The Journey opens with "Perfect Gentleman", a wedding-themed song built on Yoruba highlife instrumentation with talking drums and layered melodies, in which Sean Tizzle presents himself as an ideal partner. "Baby O" follows as an afrobeats-inspired track centered on a romantic plea, while "Take It" carries similar lyrical themes with a chorus built around the refrain "Take it, receive it".

On "Could This Be Love", Tizzle delivers a ballad reminiscent of 2Face Idibia, singing emotionally over orchestration driven by strings. "All the Way", assisted by Kcee, incorporates Igbo lyrics over an eastern highlife arrangement. "Komagbon" draws from the live instrumental feel of earlier tracks, often compared to Davido's "Skelewu", and "Igi Orombo", which features Tiwa Savage, combines contemporary highlife with saxophone lines and vocal riffs. "Duro", produced by Prince Boom, who he has worked with in the past on songs like "Your Body", diverges from D'Tunes' style with a faster-paced afropop production built on synths. Tizzle also includes celebratory tracks such as "Komole", described as an owambe party anthem, and "Mama Eh", which incorporates tribal rhythms into a club-oriented sound. Toward the end of the album, "Momayan" continues in a similar sonic direction to "Komole" and "Igi Orombo", while "Dem No Be God" closes the project with Sean Tizzle reflecting on critics and acknowledging his blessings over a near-spiritual production.

== Singles ==
The album's lead single, "Mama Eh" was released on 5 July 2013. On 17 September 2013, the music video was released for "Mama Eh". It was directed by Clarence Peters. The album's second single, "Komole" was released on 31 October 2013. Its accompanying music video was released on 11 December 2013 and directed by Aje Filmworks. Set in the 1980s, it depicts the story of Sean Tizzle's music career in a comical way. "Kilogbe" was released on 16 November 2013 as The Journey's third single. The music video for "Kilogbe" was released on 2 March 2014. It was shot in Johannesburg and directed by Sesan. The official remix of "Kilogbe" features Olamide and Reminisce, and was released on 17 April 2014 as the album's final single. Difference Entertainment released the Sesan-directed music video for "Take It" on 1 May 2014. The music video for the album's opening track, "Perfect Gentleman" was released on 25 August 2014. It was directed by Unlimited L.A and shot in South Africa among the videos for "Take It" and "Kilogbe". The music video for the 9ice-assisted "Loke Loke" was filmed in Ramburg by Unlimited L.A. On 17 December 2014, the music video for "Igi Orombo" featuring Tiwa Savage was released. It was directed by Tatenda Jamera.

== Critical reception ==
Professional ratings
Review scores
Source	Rating
Celebz360	6/10
TheNet.ng	3.5/5 stars
tooXclusive	2.5/5 stars

Upon its release, The Journey received generally positive reviews from critics. At Tooxclusive, Ogaga Sakpaide rated the album a 2.5 out of 5, calling it commercially appealing but criticized it for weak lyrics, repetitiveness, and the absence of a standout track. A review from Celebz360 rated it a 6/10. Chiagoziem Onyekwena of TheNet.ng's awarded The Journey a 3.5 out of 5 ranking. He concluded, "Sean displays enough on the Journey to hint that 'Sho Lee' wasn’t a one-off and there’s plenty more quality where that came from". Wilfred Okiche wrote that The Journey was a strong debut that showcased D'Tunes and Sean Tizzle's chemistry, and proves that he isn't a one-hit-wonder. Okiche concluded "The Journey is a stunning debut from Sean Tizzle, an artist many had predicted would go the one hit wonder way". In the review from Should You Bump This, Sho and Tunde rated it a 3.6 out of 5.

=== Accolades ===
Year	Awards ceremony	Award description(s)	Results
2014	The Headies 2014	Best R&B/Pop Album	Won
2014	Nigeria Entertainment Awards	Best Album of the Year	Nominated
2014	Ben TV Awards 2014	Album of the Year	Nominated

== Track listing ==
All tracks produced by D'Tunes except where noted.
No.	Title	Writer(s)	Producer(s)	Length
1.	"Perfect Gentleman"	Oluwaseun Morihanfen		4:14
2.	"Baby O"	Morihanfen		3:56
3.	"Take It"	Morihanfen		4:29
4.	"Kilogbe Remix" (featuring Olamide and Reminisce)	Morihanfen; Olamide Adedeji; Remilekun Safaru		4:18
5.	"Could This Be Love"	Morihanfen		5:03
6.	"Loke Loke" (featuring 9ice)	Morihanfen; Alexander Ajifolajifaola		4:44
7.	"Komagbon"	Morihanfen		3:59
8.	"All the Way" (featuring Kcee)	Morihanfen; Kingsley Okonkwo		3:47
9.	"Duro"		Prince Boom	4:35
10.	"I Got It" (featuring Ice Prince and Naeto C)	Morihanfen; Panshak Zamani; Naetochukwu Chikwe		4:35
11.	"Arewa"	Morihanfen		4:13
12.	"Igi Orombo" (featuring Tiwa Savage)	Morihanfen; Tiwatope Savage		4:28
13.	"Komole"	Morihanfen		4:09
14.	"Mama Eh"	Morihanfen		3:53
15.	"Momayan"	Morihanfen		4:28
16.	"Kilogbe"	Morihanfen		3:40
17.	"Dem No Be God"	Morihanfen	Prince Boom	3:55
Total length:				72:26

== Release history ==
Release history and formats for The Journey
Region	Date	Format	Label
Worldwide	17 April 2014	CD; digital download	Difference Entertainment
