= Desire (Iyanya album) =

Studio album by Iyanya
- Released: 6 February 2013
- Recorded: 2012–2013
- Genres: Afrobeats; R&B
- Length: 70:00
- Label: Made Men Music Group
- Producers: Tee-Y Mix; D'Tunes; Mr. Chidoo; GospelOnDeBeatz

Iyanya chronology
My Story (2009)	Desire (2013)	The Evolution (2014)

Singles from Desire
- 1. "Kukere" Released: 23 November 2011; 2. "Ur Waist" Released: 8 July 2012; 3. "Kukere (Remix)" Released: 20 August 2012; 4. "Flavour" Released: 10 November 2012; 5. "Sexy Mama" Released: 6 February 2013; 6. "Jombolo" Released: 12 June 2013

Desire (often stylized as Iyanya vs. Desire) is the second studio album by Nigerian singer Iyanya. It was released on 6 February 2013, by Made Men Music Group. The album features guest appearances from M.I, Wizkid, D'banj, Emma Nyra, Tiwa Savage, Flavour N'abania, May D, Vector, Tekno, and Yung L. The album's production was handled by Tee-Y Mix, D'Tunes, Mr. Chidoo, GospelOnDeBeatz and Young D. Desire was supported by the singles "Kukere", "Kukere" (Remix), "Flavour", "Jombolo", "Ur Waist", and "Sexy Mama".

== Background and recording ==
The meaning behind Desire stems from the concept of one having an alter ego. In a nutshell, Iyanya compares and contrasts his dualistic personalities, saying, "Desire was just an R&B guy with a great voice who took time to write music and talk about his feelings but just a few people appreciate Desire. Desire always begged for shows, hustles for everything but Iyanya is global. Iyanya is accepted by all." Iyanya started working on the album after recording his debut album, My Story, and was inspired to record the hit single "Kukere" during a visit to Calabar, his hometown. Iyanya realized that the Etighi dance didn't have a unique song. To popularize the dance, he teamed up with producer D'Tunes to record "Kukere".

== Release and promotion ==
Iyanya and his management team created a two-concert series named Iyanya vs. Desire to commemorate the completion of the record. The first concert was held at the Abuja International Conference Centre on 24 February 2013, and featured additional performances from D'banj, M.I, Wizkid, Tiwa Savage, Flavour N'abania, May D, Vector, Kcee, Slo-Flo, Addiction, I-Sick and Tekno Miles. Eko Hotel and Suites hosted the second concert on March 2, 2013; D'banj, M.I., Wizkid, Tiwa Savage, Timaya, Flavour N'abania, Davido, Seyi Shay, May D, Bracket, Vector, Iceberg Slim, and Lola Rae were among the other performers. Iyanya performed at Manchester's HMV Ritz and London's Indigo02 Arena to promote the album in the United Kingdom. The latter concert was held on 9 June 2013, while the former was held on 14 June 2013.

The D'Tunes-produced track "Kukere" was released on 23 November 2011, as the album's lead single. The accompanying music video for the song was directed by Patrick Elis. The track "Ur Waist", which features vocals by Emma Nyra, was released on 8 July 2012, as the second single. Clarence Peters filmed the song's music video. The remix of "Kukere", which features vocals by D'banj, was released on 20 August 2012, as the third single. The D'Tunes-produced track "Flavour" was released on 10 November 2012, as the fourth single. Its music video directed by Moe Musa. "Sexy Mama" and "Jombolo" were released as the album's fifth and sixth singles, respectively. Wizkid sings on the former, while Flavour N'abania lent vocals to the latter.

== Critical reception ==
Professional ratings
Review scores
Source	Rating
Nigerian Entertainment Today	3/5 stars
Jaguda	2.5/5 stars

Desire received generally mixed reviews from music critics. A writer for TayoTV, who goes by Amb Noni, said some of the album's tracks were "awesome and some were below par." In a less enthusiastic review, Nigerian Entertainment Today's Ayomide Tayo said the album is "nothing more than a product of the times we live in" and characterized it as a "pop driven LP aimed at pleasing a demography that loves beats and dance, at the expense of lyrics".

A writer for Jaguda, who goes by Ogagus, criticized Desire for being a "jam-packed project with very shallow and monotonous club and radio friendly cuts which will hold grounds individually, but as a body of work, it falls flat on its face." Reviewing for YNaija, Wilfred Okiche called the album "mediocre" and said the majority of the artists on the project "cannot see past their hunger for fame and today’s club banger".

=== Accolades ===
Desire was nominated for Album of the Year and Best R&B/Pop Album at The Headies 2013.

== Track listing ==
No.	Title	Writer(s)	Producer(s)	Length
1.	"Badman" (featuring M.I)	Iyanya Mbuk; Jude Abaga	Mr. Chidoo	3:59
2.	"Ekaette" (featuring Tekno)	Mbuk; Augustine Kelechi	D'Tunes	3:22
3.	"Gasegbe"	Mbuk	Laxio Beats	3:03
4.	"Marry Me"	Mbuk	Mr. Chidoo	3:08
5.	"Flavour"	Mbuk	D'Tunes	4:18
6.	"Limbo"	Mbuk	Young D	2:50
7.	"Whine" (featuring May D)	Mbuk; Akinmayokun Awodumila	D'Tunes	3:08
8.	"Jombolo" (featuring Flavour N'abania)	Mbuk; Chinedu Okoli	GospelOnDeBeatz	3:33
9.	"Some More" (featuring Yung L)	Mbuk; Christopher Omenye	D'Tunes	4:46
10.	"Ur Waist" (featuring Emma Nyra)	Mbuk; Emma Obi	D'Tunes	4:14
11.	"I Gat It"	Mbuk	Mr Chidoo	3:07
12.	"Somebody" (featuring Tiwa Savage)	Mbuk; Tiwatope Savage	GospelOnDeBeatz	3:50
13.	"Little Things"	Mbuk	D'Tunes	3:02
14.	"Sexy Mama" (featuring Wizkid)	Mbuk; Ayodeji Balogun	D'Tunes	3:31
15.	"Kukere"	Mbuk	D'Tunes	3:43
16.	"Your Man" (featuring Vector)	Mbuk; Olanrewaju Ogunmefun	D'Tunes	3:05
17.	"Drowning"	Mbuk	Tee-Y Mix	4:03
18.	"Kukere (Remix)" (featuring D'banj)	Mbuk; Oladapo Oyebanjo	D'Tunes	4:28
19.	"Bust Me Brain"	Mbuk	D'Tunes	5:11
Total length:				70:00

== Personnel ==
- Iyanya – primary artist
- Emma Nyra – featured artist
- M.I – featured artist
- D'banj – featured artist
- Wizkid – featured artist
- Tiwa Savage – featured artist
- Flavour N'abania – featured artist
- May D – featured artist
- Tekno – featured artist
- Yung L – featured artist
- Tee-Y Mix – producer
- D'Tunes – producer
- Mr. Chidoo – producer
- GospelOnDeBeatz – producer
- Young D – producer
- Patrick Elis – video director
- Mr. Moe Musa – video director
- Clarence Peters – video director
- Sesan – video director

== Release history ==
Region	Date	Format	Label
Nigeria	6 February 2013	CD, Digital download	Made Men Music Group
