= 2013 Nigeria Entertainment Awards =

- Date: 1 September 2013
- Location: Skirball Center for the Performing Arts; New York, United States
- Hosted by: Basketmouth

The 2013 Nigeria Entertainment Awards was the 8th edition of the ceremony. It was held at the Skirball Center for the Performing Arts in New York and hosted by Basketmouth.

== Award winners ==
Winners are listed in bold.

=== Music categories ===
==== Best Album of the Year ====
- Upgrade - Timaya
- Omo Baba Olowo - Davido
- **YBNL – Olamide**
- Empire Mates State of Mind - EME
- The Son of a Kapenta - Brymo
- R&BW - Banky W

==== Hottest Single of the Year ====
- **"Kukere" - Iyanya**
- "This Year" - Jaywon
- "Kokoma" - K9
- "Limpopo" - KCee
- "Beat of Life (Samba)" - Sarz featuring Wizkid

==== Best New Act of the Year ====
- Sean Tizzle
- Ketchup
- Seyi Shay
- **Burna Boy**
- Ajebutter22
- Dammy Krane

==== Gospel Artist/Group of the Year ====
- Frank Edwards
- Onos
- Monique
- Funke Akinokun
- **Sammy Okposo**
- Bouqui

==== Best Pop/R&B Artist of the Year ====
- Praiz
- Banky W
- Wizkid
- Iyanya
- **Davido**
- Wande Coal

==== Best Rap Act of the Year ====
- Olamide
- Jesse Jagz
- **Ice Prince**
- Vector
- Phyno
- Ruggedman

==== Music Producer of the Year ====
- **Spellz**
- Masterkraft
- Chopstix
- Sarz
- Shizzi
- Fliptyce

==== Music Video of the Year ====
- "Tonight" - Burna Boy (Directed by Mex)
- "Sisi Eko" - Darey featuring Flavour (Directed by Mark Hofmeyr)
- "Skibo" - Solid Star (Directed by Clarence Peters)
- **"Ghetto" - Shank (Directed by Patrick Elis)**
- "Voice of the Streets" - Olamide (Directed by Mattmax)
- "Oliver Twist" - D'Banj (Directed by Sesan)

==== Most Promising Male Act to Watch ====
- SugaBoiz
- K9
- Bular
- Black Magic
- **Endia**
- Man
- Yung L

==== Most Promising Female Act to Watch ====
- Aramide
- Oyinkansola
- Lola Rae
- **Emma Nyra**
- Victoria Kimani
- Aura
- Lil Miss Miss
- Niyola

==== Eastern African Artist or Group of the Year ====
- Camp Mulla
- Fally Ipupa
- K'naan
- **Navio**
- Radio & Weasel
- P-Unit

==== Western African Artist or Group of the Year ====
- **Sarkodie**
- Toofan
- Efya
- R2Bees
- Magic System
- Vivian Candid

==== Southern African Artist or Group of the Year ====
- Tear Gas
- AKA
- **Zahara**
- The Very Best
- Dama Do Bling
- Zone Fam

==== Best International Act ====
- Lil' Simz
- Fuse ODG
- Stylzz
- Sean CSA
- Tolumide
- **JJC**

==== Best Indigenous Artist or Group ====
- Flavour N'abania
- **Olamide**
- Timaya
- Jaywon
- Kcee
- Reminisce

==== Best Collabo ====
- "Tony Montana" - Naeto C featuring D'banj
- "Bottom Belle" - Omawumi featuring Flavour
- "Emi na Baller" - Chidinma featuring Suspect & IllBliss
- **"Ghost Mode" - Phyno featuring Olamide**
- "Baddest Boy" - E.M.E
- "Without My Heart" - Tiwa Savage featuring Don Jazzy

=== Film categories ===
==== Best Lead Actor in a Film ====
- **OC Ukeje - Alan Poza**
- Femi Jacobs - The Meeting
- Bimbo Manuel - Heroes & Zeros
- Ali Nuhu - Confusion Na Wa
- Hakeem Kae Kazim - Last Flight to Abuja
- Mike Ezuruonye - Friendly Scorpion

==== Best Lead Actress in a Film ====
- Joke Muyiwa - Ayitale
- **Rita Dominic - The Meeting**
- Uche Jombo - Mrs Somebody
- Genevieve Nnaji - Doctor Bello
- Omotola Jalade Ekeinde - Last Flight to Abuja
- Mercy Johnson - Facebook Babes

==== Best Supporting Actor in a Film ====
- **Ali Nuhu - Blood & Henna**
- Jide Kosoko - The Meeting
- Gabriel Afolayan - Heroes & Zeros
- Jim Iyke - Last Flight to Abuja
- OC Ukeje - Confusion Na Wa
- Alfred Atungu - Twin Sword

==== Best Supporting Actress in a Film ====
- Ebbe Bassey - Doctor Bello
- Belinda Effah - Kokomma
- **Tunde Aladese - Confusion Na Wa**
- Nse Ikpe Etim - Kiss and Tell
- Oge Okoye - Facebook Babes
- Tonto Dike - My Life My Damage

==== Best Film Director ====
- Charles Novia - Alan Poza
- John Uche - Bianca
- Niji Akanni - Heroes & Zeroes
- Nse Ikpe Etim - Kiss and Tell
- **Tunde Kelani - Maami**
- Kenneth Gyang - Confusion Na Wa
- Ifeanyi Ogbonna - Facebook Babes

==== Best Picture ====
- Confusion Na Wa
- **Last Flight to Abuja**
- The Meeting
- Heroes & Zeros
- The Twin Sword
- Alan Poza

==== Pan African Actor ====
- Chris Attoh - Single & Married
- Frank Artus - Heart of a Wife
- Majid Michel - The Groom's Bride
- Thomas Gumede - Otelo Burning
- David Mapane - Taxi Cop
- **John Dumelo - Letters to my Mother**

==== Pan African Actress ====
- Yvonne Okoro - The Contract
- **Nadia Buari - Single and Married**
- Yvonne Nelson - Single & Married
- Mbufung Seikeh - Ninah's Dowry
- Matshepo Maleme - A Million Colours
- Nolwazi Shange - Otelo Burning

==== Best International Actor ====
- Gbenga Akinnagbe
- **Dayo Okeniyi**
- Adewale Akinnuoye-Agbaje
- Emmanuel Akintunde
- Nonso Anozie
- David Oyelowo

==== Best International Actress ====
- Megalyn Echikunwoke
- Ashley Madekwe
- Caroline Chikezie
- **Hope Olaide Wilson**
- Adepero Oduye
- Judi Shekoni

=== Other awards ===
Best TV Show

- Jara
- Moments with Mo
- Project Fame
- Sunrise Daily — Channels TV
- Idol
- **Big Brother Africa**

==== World DJ ====
- DJ Xclusive
- DJ Tunez
- DJ Sose
- DJ TTB
- DJ Spinall
- **DJ Bayo**

==== Best Comedian ====
- Senator
- Bovi
- **Basketmouth**
- Emeka Smith
- Seyi Law
- I Go Dye

==== Entertainment Promoters ====
- Shekpe Knights
- Big A
- Bigmoose Ent
- Stronghold Ent
- **Coko Bar**
- Empire Entertainment

==== Radio OAP of the Year ====
- YAW — Wazobia FM
- **Freeze — Cool FM**
- Tolu — Nigeria info
- Ajebo — Naija FM
- Gbemi - The Beat 99.9 FM
- Toke Makinwa - Rhythm 93.7 FM

==== TV Personality ====
- Denrele
- Adams
- **Labi Layori**
- Dolapo Oni
- Uti Nwachukwu
- Yvonne "Vixen" Ekwere

==== Entertainment Blog ====
- **NotJustOk**
- 360Nobs
- Linda Ikeji
- BellaNaija
- Ndani TV
- Factory78

==== Entertainment Executive ====
- Gaga (YSG Ent)
- Ibaka TV
- Tony Nwakolor - 1805
- **Ubi Franklin — Made Men Music**
- Jason Njoku - iROKOtv
- Eric Idiahi - Spinlet
