= The Headies =

Nigerian music award

- Current: 18th Headies Awards
- Awarded for: Outstanding achievements in the Nigerian music industry
- Country: Nigeria
- Presented by: Hip Hop World Magazine
- First award: 10 March 2006; 20 years ago
- Website: theheadies.com

Television/radio coverage
- Network: HipTV

The Headies Awards, originally called the Hip Hop World Awards and often referred to as The Headies, are honors established in 2006 by Hip Hop World Magazine to recognize outstanding achievements in the Nigerian music industry. The ceremony features performances by established and promising artists, and is broadcast live on HipTV to viewers across Nigeria. The first two editions were held at the Muson Center in Onikan, Lagos State. Between 2010 and 2012, the awards were held at the Eko Hotel and Suites in Victoria Island, Lagos. Various media personalities in Nigeria have hosted the ceremony, including Darey Art Alade, D'banj, Dakore Egbuson, Banky W., Rita Dominic, M.I, Tiwa Savage and Dr SID.

== History and plaque ==
The image of The Headies was created by Ayo Animashaun, the founder of the awards, and drawn by Matthias Aragbada. The first Headie plaque was done by Jide Adewoye. It represents the "image and the shout of a young, vibrant individual whose talent can challenge that of renowned local and international artistes combined, but who has almost lost confidence in his abilities in the face of discouraging circumstances presented by the peculiar Nigerian environment." In 2008, the plaque was redone in the United Kingdom. It was plated with 21 carat gold. The new plaque is a mixture of resin, copper, steel, marble and gold.

As of 2018, The Headies is composed of 25 categories. Open voting decides majority of the awards' categories. However, the Best Recording of the Year, Best Rap Album, Best Vocal Performance (Male), Best Vocal Performance (Female), Lyricist on the Roll, and Best Performer categories are not open to public voting.

== Notable moments ==
=== 2000s ===
2006: The 1st edition of the Hip Hop World Awards was held on 10 March 2006, at the Shell Hall of the MUSON Centre in Onikan, Lagos. It was hosted by Darey Art Alade and tagged with the caption: "The Revolution is Here". DJ Jimmy Jatt, Keke Ogungbe and Dayo 'D1' Adeneye were joint winners of the Hall of Fame award. P-Square and Jude Okoye eclipsed their colleagues that year, taking home five awards.

2007: The 2nd edition of the Hip Hop World Awards was hosted by D'banj and Tana. It was held on 17 March 2007, at the Muson Center for the second consecutive year. Paul Play was nominated for six awards and ended up going home with four.

2008: The 3rd edition of the Hip Hop World Awards was hosted by comedian Basketmouth and Nollywood actress Dakore Egbuson. It was held on 15 March 2008, at Planet One in Maryland, Lagos. The founders and promoters chose the theme "Change has to Change". The nominees' party was held at Babylon, a private beach resort. In 2008, the plaque of The Headies was plated with 21 carat gold. French-Nigerian singer Aṣa won three awards, including Album of the Year for her eponymous debut studio album. 2face Idibia received the most nominations with six. Naeto C, Rooftop MCs, Cobhams Asuquo, Kween, Jo'zi, and P-Square all performed at the ceremony.

2009: The 4th edition of the Hip Hop World Awards was hosted by Banky W. and Kemi Adetiba. It took place on 16 May 2009, at the International Conference Centre in Abuja. The awards were held outside of Lagos for the first time. The nominees' party for the fourth edition was hosted at Ajibogun, a village in Ogun State. 9ice won a total of three awards from six nominations. Phillip Trimnell took home the Hall of Fame award.

=== 2010s ===
2010: The 5th edition of the Hip Hop World Awards took place on 16 May 2009, at the Eko Hotel and Suites in Victoria Island, Lagos. The ceremony was conducted without a host. Wande Coal was the biggest winner of the night with five plaques, including Artiste of the Year. Don Jazzy won the Producer of the Year award. Hip hop duo Skuki won the Next Rated category. Da Grin's C.E.O won for Best Rap Album, posthumously. He was also honored by General Pype during the singer's performance.

2011: The 6th edition of the Hip Hop World Awards was held on 22 October 2011, at the Eko Hotel and Suites in Victoria Island, Lagos. Hosted by Rita Dominic and eLDee, the award's name was officially changed to "The Headies". 2face Idibia won three awards, including Artiste of the Year. Darey's "The Way You Are" won for Best R&B Single and Recording of the Year. M.I and Ice Prince won two awards apiece. Don Jazzy and Dr SID both took home an award. Capital Femi walked away with the Best Vocal Performance (Male) award. Wizkid won the Next Rated plaque and received a Hyundai Sonata at a later date. Waje was the only female awardee. The Hall of Fame award went to Jùjú musician Shina Peters. A total of twenty-one cart gold plaques were handed out.

2012: The 7th edition of The Headies was hosted by M.I and Omawumi. The ceremony took place on 20 October 2012, at the Eko Hotel and Suites in Victoria Island, Lagos. The aforementioned hosts thrilled fans with their song titled "The Headies". Chidinma opened the show by performing her song "Kedike". The Okoye brothers (Peter, Paul, and Jude) won a total of three awards. The Artiste of the Year award went to Wizkid. Tiwa Savage and Wande Coal won the Best Male and Female Vocal Performance categories, respectively. Vector won the Best Rap Single and Lyricist on the Roll plaques for "Angeli". Davido won the Next Rated category and was later awarded a Hyundai Sonata. The Headies celebrated the reunion of prominent Nigerian musicians from the 80s and 90s, including Onyeka Onwenu, Oris Wiliki, Mike Okori, Baba Fryo, Shina Peters, Fatai Rolling Dollar and Daddy Showkey. Femi Kuti was honored with the Hall of Fame award.

2013: The 8th edition of The Headies was held on 26 December 2013, at the Oriental Hotel in Lagos. The show was hosted by Tiwa Savage and Dr SID. Olamide was the biggest awardee of the night, winning three awards from seven nominations. Phyno won the Best Rap Single category for his song "Man of the Year". D'Tunes, Praiz, and Blackmagic all won for the first time. Sean Tizzle won the Next Rated category and was later awarded a Hyundai Tucson. Davido took home two awards, including Best R&B/Pop Album for Omo Baba Olowo. Iyanya only received one award from five nominations. Veteran Fuji artist Wasiu Ayinde Marshall was inducted into the Headies Hall of Fame. 2 Face Idibia, Banky W., Waje, Nikki Laoye, Mode 9, Dr SID and Kcee all went home with a plaque. Harrysong's tribute song to Nelson Mandela, titled "Mandela", won the Most Downloaded Callertune award.

2014: The 9th edition of The Headies took place on 14 December 2014, at the Eko Hotel and Suites in Victoria Island, Lagos. Themed "Feel the Passion", the show was hosted by Toke Makinwa and Basketmouth. It was initially scheduled to hold on 25 October 2014. Bovi was initially announced as one of the hosts, but ended up not hosting due to him being booked for another show. On 30 September 2014, nominations were announced during a press briefing at the HipTV office in Allen, Lagos. Kcee, Olamide and Phyno led the nominations with five each. Tiwa Savage, Oritse Femi and The Mavins followed closely with four apiece. Yemi Alade was nominated for Song of the Year, Best Pop Single and Next Rated. Olamide, Patoranking and Davido each took home two awards apiece. Don Jazzy won the Producer of the Year plaque, while Sir Victor Uwaifo got the Hall of Fame recognition.

2015: The 10th edition of The Headies was held on 1 January 2016, at the Landmark Events Centre in Victoria Island, Lagos. Themed "Flip the Script", the event was hosted by Bovi and Kaffy. It was previously scheduled to hold on 30 December 2015, but was postponed to 1 January 2016 for unknown reasons. Olamide won a total of four awards, while Timi Dakolo won three. Wizkid was nominated seven times across the twenty-one award categories. 2face Idibia was honored with the Hall of Fame award, while Don Jazzy received the Special Recognition award. Reekado Banks won the Next Rated award. His win was criticized by music critics, who challenged the "fairness of the award process".

2016: The 11th edition of The Headies was held on 22 December 2016, at the Eko Convention Centre in Victoria Island, Lagos. Themed "Think, Create, Recreate", the event was hosted by Adesua Etomi and Falz. The nominees were announced by the award's organizers in November 2016. Tekno was nominated for the Next Rated award, but ended up being disqualified due to his refusal to honour the category and support the campaign. Jazzman Olofin and Adewale Ayuba jointly performed the song "Raise the Roof". Aramide performed her song "Funmi Lowo" with assistance from Ras Kimono. The ceremony also featured additional performances from Falz, 2Baba, Seyi Shay and Flavour. Olamide received eight nominations and won a total of four, including Best Rap Single for his single "Eyan Mayweather". Mr Eazi won the Next Rated category and was awarded a SUV at a later date. Mayorkun toppled Dice Ailes and Koker for the Rookie of the Year award. Laolu Akins was honored with the Hall of Fame award, while Flavour received the Special Recognition award.

2018: The 12th edition of The Headies was held on 5 May 2018, at the Eko Convention Centre in Victoria Island, Lagos. Nigerian comedian Bovi and singer Seyi Shay hosted the ceremony. After shortlisting thousands of entries submitted during the eligibility period, the organizers of the ceremony announced the nominees in April 2018. They also announced the addition of three categories: Viewer's Choice, Best Performer, and Industry Brand Supporter. Simi led the nominations with seven, followed by Wizkid and Davido with six each. The ceremony featured performances from a number of artists, including Falz, Mr Real, Simi, and the Danfo Drivers. Pulse Nigeria praised the award's sound production and stage design. Davido, Wizkid and Simi won three awards apiece. Mayorkun won the Next Rated award, beating Dice Ailes, Maleek Berry and Johnny Drille.

2019: The 13th edition of The Headies was held on 19 October 2019, at the Eko Convention Centre in Victoria Island, Lagos. Themed "Power of a Dream", the ceremony was hosted by Nigerian rapper Reminisce and actress/media personality Nancy Isime. After shortlisting thousands of entries submitted between January 2018 and June 2019, the organizers announced the nominees on 1 October 2019. Burna Boy set a record for the most nominations in one night with 10 nominations. Teni followed with six and Wizkid with five. The ceremony featured performances from a number of artists, including Styl-Plus, Sunny Neji, Duncan Mighty, Teni and Victor AD. Teni won four awards. becoming the most awarded that year. Rema won the Next Rated award, beating Fireboy DML, Joeboy, Lyta, Victor AD and Zlatan Ibile.

=== 2020s ===
2020: The 14th edition of The Headies was held on 21 February 2021, at the La Campagne Tropicana Beach Resort in Ibeju-Lekki. Event organizers announced that TV personality and actress Nancy Isime and comedian Bovi were the hosts. This is the fourth time Bovi has hosted the event, while Nancy has become the first female to host the event for the second time.

2023: The 16th Headies Awards took place on Sunday, September 3, 2023, at the Cobb Energy Performing Arts Center in Atlanta, Georgia. The awards ceremony was hosted by Osas Ighodaro and Terrence J. Burna Boy led the nominations with 11 nominations, followed by Rema with nine nominations. The biggest winners of the night were Rema and Burna Boy, who each took home three awards. Other notable winners included Wizkid, Davido, Ayra Starr, Asake and Omah Lay. The event was also marked by the induction of Angelique Kidjo into the Headies Hall of Fame.

2027: The 18th Headies Awards will take place on Saturday Arpil 10, 2027 and Sunday April 11, 2027 for the first time in Toronto, Canada. Beyond the ceremony, The Headies launched of its first Trade and Investment Summit, for discussions on investment, innovation and sustainable growth within Nigeria’s creative sector.

== Locations ==
The Headies dates and locations
Edition	Year	Date	City	Venue	Host(s)	Ref
1st	2006	10 March	Onikan, Lagos	MUSON Centre	Dare Art Alade	
2nd	2007	17 March	Onikan, Lagos	MUSON Centre	Tana Adelana and D'banj	
3rd	2008	15 March	Maryland, Lagos	Planet One	Basketmouth and Dakore Egbuson	
4th	2009	16 May	Abuja, Nigeria	Abuja International Conference Centre	Banky W. and Kemi Adetiba	
5th	2010	29 May	Victoria Island, Lagos	Eko Hotel and Suites	—N/a	
6th	2011	22 October	Victoria Island, Lagos	Eko Hotel and Suites	Rita Dominic and eLDee	
7th	2012	20 October	Victoria Island, Lagos	Eko Hotel and Suites	M.I and Omawumi	
8th	2013	26 December	Victoria Island, Lagos	Oriental Hotel	Tiwa Savage and Dr SID	
9th	2014	14 December	Victoria Island, Lagos	Eko Hotel and Suites	Toke Makinwa and Basketmouth	
10th	2015	1 January 2016	Victoria Island, Lagos	Landmark Events Centre	Bovi and Kaffy	
11th	2016	22 December	Victoria Island, Lagos	Eko Convention Center	Falz and Adesua Etomi	
	2017	No ceremony held				
12th	2018	6 May	Victoria Island, Lagos	Eko Convention Center	Bovi and Seyi Shay	
13th	2019	19 October	Victoria Island, Lagos	Eko Convention Center	Nancy Isime and Reminisce	
14th	2020	21 February 2021	Ibeju Lekki, Lagos	La Campagne Tropicana Beach Resort	Bovi and Nancy Isime	
	2021	No ceremony held				
15th	2022	4 September 2022	Atlanta, United States	Cobb Energy Performing Arts Centre	Anthony Anderson and Osas ighodaro	
16th	2023	3 September 2023	Atlanta, United States	Cobb Energy Performing Arts Centre	Terrence J and Osas Ighodaro	
	2024	No ceremony held				
17th	2025	5 April 2025	Lagos	Landmark Event Centre	Nancy Isime	
	2026	No ceremony held				
18th	2027	10 April 2027	Toronto, Canada	TBA	TBA	

== Award categories ==
=== Current categories ===
Voting

- Best Rap Single (2006–present)
- Song of the Year (2006–present)
- Best Collaboration (2006–present)
- Album of the Year (2006–present)
- Next Rated (2006–present)
- Hip Hop World Revelation of the Year (2006–present)
- Producer of the Year (2006–present)
- African Artiste of the Year (2006–present)
- Best Music Video Director (2006–present)
- Artiste of the Year (2006–present)
- Best R&B/Pop Album (2006; 2008–present)
- Best Street Hop Artiste (2009–present)
- Best R&B Single (2010–present)
- Best Pop Single (2010–present)
- Rookie of the Year (2012–present)
- Viewer's Choice (2018–present)
- Best Afrobeat Pop Single (2022–present)
- Best Afrobeat Pop Album (2022–present)
- Best African Collaboration (2022–present)
- Best International Collaboration (2022–present)
- African Artist of the Year (2022–present)
- International Artist of the Year (2022–present)
- Music Executive of the Year (2022–present)

Non-voting

- Best Recording of the Year (2006–present)
- Best Rap Album (2006–present)
- Best Vocal Performance (Female) (2006–present)
- Best Vocal Performance (Male) (2006–present)
- Lyricist on the Roll (2006–present)
- Best Performer (2018–present)

Miscellaneous

- Hall of Fame (2006–present)
- Special Recognition Award (2015–present)

=== Past award categories ===
Best Reggae/Dancehall Album (2006–2009)
Year	Recipient	Result	Ref
2006	Take Control by Marvellous Benji	Won	
2007	Versatile by Baba Dee	Won	
2007	Little Patience by Majek Fashek	Nominated	
2007	Let It Go by Spy Da Man	Nominated	
2007	Conscious News by Righteousman	Nominated	
2007	Reflex by Azadus	Nominated	
2007	Ghetto Philosophy by Streetmonks	Nominated	
2008	True Story by Timaya	Won	
2008	Uchie by African Rockstar	Nominated	
2008	Fever by African China	Nominated	
2009	Gift and Grace by Timaya	Won	
2009	Me Musiq and I by Blackface	Nominated	
2009	Ichiban by Chakka Da' Souljah	Nominated	
2009	My Shine by Black Solo	Nominated	
Best Rap by a Duo or Group (2006)
2006	"Street Hop" by Thoroughbreds	Won	
Best Pop Album (2007)
2007	After the Storm by Weird MC	Won	
2007	Run Down by D'banj	Nominated	
2007	Naija is Blessed by Soul E	Nominated	
2007	Free Soldierby Tony Tetuila	Nominated	
2007	Mr Funky by Jazzman Olofin	Nominated	
2007	Right and Wrong by Mr Raw	Nominated	
Best R&B Album (2007)
2007	Hitsville by Paul Play	Won	
2007	From Me to You by Darey	Nominated	
2007	No Drama by OJB Jezreel	Nominated	
2007	Overture by Obiwon	Nominated	
2007	Expressions by Styl Plus	Nominated	
Best Conscious Song of the Year (2011)
2011	"One Day" – eLDee	Won	
2011	"If You Ask Me" by Omawumi	Nominated	
2011	"Wild Wild West" by M.I	Nominated	
2011	"Only Me" by 2Face Idibia	Nominated	
2011	"There is a Cry" by Timi Dakolo	Nominated	
Best Label Head (2012)
2012	Banky W.	Won	
Most Downloaded Callertune Single (2013)
2013	"Mandela" by Harrysong	Won	
