= The Headies Award for Producer of the Year =

Nigerian music industry award

- Awarded for: For producing the most acclaimed song or album in the year under review
- Country: Nigeria
- Presented by: Hip Hop World Magazine
- First award: 2006
- Final award: 2023
- Website: theheadies.com

The Headies Award for Producer of the Year is an award presented at The Headies, a ceremony that was established in 2006 and originally called the Hip Hop World Awards. (Note: The nominees for the 2006 edition are not included in the Recipients table because they are not available.) It was first presented to Don Jazzy in 2006.

== Recipients ==
Producer of the Year
Year	Nominees	Result
2023	Rexxie – "Abracadabra" (Rexxie, Naira Marley, Skiibii & Wizkid)	Won
2023	Magicsticks – "Sungba Remix" (Asake)	Nominated
2023	P.Prime, Tmxo & Pheelz – "Electricity" (Pheelz ft. Davido)	Nominated
2023	Andre Vibez & London – "Calm Down" (Rema)	Nominated
2023	Tempoe – "Soweto" (Victony & Tempoe)	Nominated
2023	Kel-P – "Kpe Paso" (Wande Coal & Olamide)	Nominated
2020	Pheelz– "Billionaire" by Teni	Won
2020	SPAX – "Away" by Oxlade	Nominated
2020	Kel-P – "Pull Up" by Burna Boy	Nominated
2020	Sarz – "Mad" by Sarz, Wurld	Nominated
2020	Nonso Amadi – "What makes you sure"	Nominated
2019	Killertunes – "Fake Love" by Starboy (featuring Duncan Mighty, Wizkid)	Won
2019	Phantom – "Ye" by Burna Boy	Nominated
2019	Ozedikus – "Dumebi" by Rema	Nominated
2019	Spellz – "Askamaya" by Teni	Nominated
2019	Kel-P Vibes – "Killin Dem" by Burna Boy (featuring Zlatan Ibile)	Nominated
2018	Kiddominant – "Fall", "Mama"	Won
2018	Spellz – "Iskaba", "Ma Lo"	Nominated
2018	Tekno – "If", "Rara"	Nominated
2018	Sarz – "Maradona", "Come Closer"	Nominated
2018	Masterkraft – "Yawa", "Virtuous Woman"	Nominated
2016	Young John – "Mama"	Won
2016	DJ Coublon – "Good Time", "Raba"	Nominated
2016	Pheelz – "Pick Up", "Lagos Boys"	Nominated
2016	Legendury Beatz – "Final (Baba Nla)"	Nominated
2016	Oscar Heman-Ackah – "Pray for Me"	Nominated
2015	Legendury Beatz – "Ojuelegba"	Won
2015	Don Jazzy – "Godwin"	Nominated
2015	Masterkraft – "Wiser"	Nominated
2015	Cobhams Asuquo – "There's A Fire"	Nominated
2015	Shizzi – "Fans Mi"	Nominated
2015	Young John – "Bobo"	Nominated
2014	Don Jazzy – "Dorobucci"	Won
2014	Pheelz – "Eleda Mi O"	Nominated
2014	T-Spize – "Aye"	Nominated
2014	Legendury Beatz – "Caro"	Nominated
2014	Shizzi – "Skelewu"	Nominated
2014	Del B – "Pull Over"	Nominated
2013	D'Tunes – "Sho Lee"	Won
2013	Pheelz – "Durosoke"	Nominated
2013	Del B – "Limpopo"	Nominated
2013	Leriq – "Like to Party"	Nominated
2013	Legendury Beatz – "Emi ni Baller"	Nominated
2012	Tee-Y Mix – "Super C Season"	Won
2012	Cobhams Asuquo – "Stupid Song"	Nominated
2012	Shizzi – "Dami Duro"	Nominated
2012	Jay Sleek – "Private Trips"	Nominated
2012	Jesse Jagz – "Everybody Loves Ice Prince"	Nominated
2011	Don Jazzy – "Over the Moon", "Mr Endowed", "Pop Champaign"	Won
2011	Samklef – "Don't Dull", "Kilode", "Jonzing World", "Noni"	Nominated
2011	Jay Sleek – "Only Me", "2010"	Nominated
2011	Jesse Jagz – "Oleku", "Jargo"	Nominated
2011	Cobhams Asuquo – "The Way You Are", "There Is A Cry"	Nominated
2010	Don Jazzy	Won
2010	Cobhams Asuquo	Nominated
2010	Tee-Y Mix	Nominated
2010	Sossick	Nominated
2010	Dokta Frabz	Nominated
2009	ID Cabasa – "Gongo Aso"	Won
2009	Tee-Y Mix – "Ki Ni Big Deal"	Nominated
2009	Don Jazzy – "Fall in Love"	Nominated
2009	Terry G – "In Case You Never Know"	Nominated
2009	Jesse Jagz – "Short Black Boy"	Nominated
2008	Cobhams Asuquo – "Bibanke"	Won
2008	ID Cabasa – "Ruggedy Baba"	Nominated
2008	Mosa – "Greenland"	Nominated
2008	Puffy Tee – "Yahoozee"	Nominated
2008	OJB Jezreel – See me So	Nominated
2006	Don Jazzy – "Tongolo'", "Ijoya"	Won

== Category records ==
Most wins

Rank	1st	2nd
Producer	Don Jazzy	Killertunes; Kiddominant; Young John; Legendury Beatz; D'Tunes; Tee-Y Mix; ID Cabasa; Cobhams Asuquo
Total wins	4 wins	1 win

Most nominations

Rank	1st	2nd	3rd
Producer	Don Jazzy	Cobhams Asuquo	Legendury Beatz
Total noms	6 nominations	5 nominations	4 nominations
