= 8th Headies Awards =

Nigerian music industry awards

The Headies 2013
- Date: 26 December 2013
- Location: Oriental Hotel; Victoria Island, Lagos
- Country: Nigeria
- Hosted by: Tiwa Savage and Dr SID
- Most awards: Olamide (3)
- Most nominations: Olamide (7)
- Website: theheadies.com

Television/radio coverage
- Network: HipTV

The Headies 2013 was the 8th edition of The Headies. It was held on 26 December 2013, at the Oriental Hotel in Lagos. The show was hosted by Tiwa Savage and Dr SID. Olamide was the biggest awardee of the night, winning three awards from seven nominations. Phyno won the Best Rap Single category for his song "Man of the Year". D'Tunes, Praiz, and Blackmagic all won for the first time. Sean Tizzle won the Next Rated category and was later awarded a Hyundai Tucson. Davido took home two awards, including Best R&B/Pop Album for Omo Baba Olowo. Iyanya only received one award from five nominations. Veteran Fuji artist Wasiu Ayinde Marshall was inducted into the Headies Hall of Fame. 2 Face Idibia, Banky W., Waje, Nikki Laoye, Mode 9, Dr SID and Kcee all went home with a plaque. Harrysong's tribute song to Nelson Mandela, titled "Mandela", won the Most Downloaded Callertune award.

== Controversy ==
Burna Boy reportedly exited the Oriental Hotel after Sean Tizzle was announced as the winner of the Next Rated category. He allegedly told photographers not to take photos of him.

== Performers ==
The following artists performed at the ceremony:

Artist(s)	Song(s)
Iyanya	"Ur Waist"
Waje	
Olamide	"Durosoke"
Phyno	"Ghost Mode"
Praiz	
Seyi Shay	"Irawo"
Niyola	"Toh Bad"
Zaina	
Yemi Alade	

== Presenters ==
- Mai Atafo
- Stephanie Coker
- Yvonne Ekwere
- Koch Okoye
- Darey Art Alade
- Kemi Adetiba
- Chin Okeke
- Seyi Law
- Lynxxx
- Osas Ighodaro
- Mercy Omo London
- Toolz
- Kelechi Amadi Obi
- Funmi Iyanda
- Illbliss
- Jumoke Awolade-James
- Daddy Freeze
- Tewa Onasanya
- Chris Ihidero

== Winners and nominees ==
Best R&B/Pop Album	Best R&B Single
Desire – Iyanya; Omo Baba Olowo – Davido (Winner); R&BW – Banky W.; Blessed – Flavour N'abania; Away and Beyond – 2Face Idibia	"Don't Let Go" – Capital Femi; "Good Good Loving" – Banky W. (Winner); "Like to Party" – Burna Boy; "Rich & Famous" – Praiz; "Omote" – Ese Peters
Best Vocal Performance (Male)	Best Vocal Performance (Female)
"Rich & Famous" – Praiz (Winner); "Omote" – Ese Peters; "Don’t Let Go" – Capital Femi; "Yes/No" – Banky W.	"I Wish" – Waje; "Toh Bad" – Niyola; "Irawo" – Seyi Shay; "Totally Yours" – Zaina; "Only You" – Nikki Laoye (Winner)
Next Rated	Hip Hop World Revelation of the Year
Sean Tizzle (Winner); Dammy Krane; Burna Boy; Seyi Shay; Phyno	W.A.J.E – Waje; Omo Baba Olowo – Davido (Winner); Frenzy! – D'Prince; The Year of R&B – Capital Femi; "Yes/No" – Banky W
Best Recording of the Year	Producer of the Year
"I Wish" – Waje; "Good Morning" – Brymo; "Natural Something" – Sound Sultan; "This Year" – Jaywon (Winner)	Pheelz for "Durosoke"; D'Tunes for "Sho Lee" (Winner); Del B for "Limpopo"; Leriq for "Like to Party"; Legendury Beatz for "Emi Ni Baller"
Best Collabo	Best Music Video
"Ghost Mode" – Phyno (featuring Olamide) (Winner); "Tony Montana" (Remix) – Naeto C (featuring D'banj); "Baddest Boy" – E.M.E (featuring Wizkid, Skales, and Banky W.); "Eziokwu" – Lynxxx (featuring Ikechukwu, Illbliss, and Phyno); "Emi Ni Baller" – Chidinma (featuring Suspect and Illbliss); "Baby Mi Da (Remix)" – Dr. Victor Olaiya (featuring 2Face Idibia)	"Alingo" – Jude Okoye/Clarence Peters (Winner); "Oliver Twist" – Sesan; "Gaga Crazy" – Aje Filmworks; "Azonto" – Moe Musa; "Yes/No" – Clarence Peters
Best Pop Single	Best Reggae/Dancehall Single
"Ihe Ne Me" – 2Face Idibia (Winner); "The Kick" – Wande Coal (featuring Don Jazzy); "Gobe" – Davido; "Catching Cold" – Tunde Ednut; "Ur Waist" – Iyanya; "Goody Bag" – D'Prince	"I Wish" – Waje (Winner); "Rihanna" – Orezi; "Give it To Me" – General Pype; "Go Down" – Baba Dee
Best Rap Album	Best Rap Single
Oga Boss – Illbliss; The Second Coming – Vector; YBNL – Olamide (Winner); Book of Rap Stories – Reminisce	"Man of the Year" – Phyno (Winner); "Anam Achi Kwanu" – Illbliss (featuring Phyno); "Durosoke" – Olamide; "2 Musshh" – Reminisce; "Ghost Mode" – Phyno (featuring Olamide)
Lyricist on the Roll	Best Street-Hop Artiste
Olamide – "Voice of the Streets"; Boogey – "Sanctum"; Mode 9 – "Let It Go" (Winner); Phyno – "Man of the Year"	"Run Mad" – Terry G; "Durosoke" – Olamide (Winner); "My Dear" – Dammy Krane; "Skibo" – Solid Star; "Alaye" – LKT
Best Alternative Song	Album of the Year
"Repete" – Black Magic (Winner); "Omo Pastor" – Ajebutter22 (featuring BOJ); "Feel Alright" – Show Dem Camp (featuring BOJ and POE); "This Year" – Jaywon	Desire – Iyanya; Omo Baba Olowo – Davido; R&BW – Banky W; Blessed – Flavour; YBNL – Olamide (Winner)
Hall of Fame	Most Downloaded Callertune
Wasiu Ayinde Marshall	Harrysong – "Mandela"
Song of the Year	Artiste of the Year
"Durosoke" – Olamide; "Ur Waist" – Iyanya; "Alingo" – P-Square; "Sho Lee" – Sean Tizzle; "Limpopo" – Kcee (Winner)	Iyanya (Winner); Davido; Wizkid; Flavour; Olamide; Ice Prince
African Artiste of the Year (winner not announced)
(South Africa) Mi Casa (Ghana) R2Bees (South Africa) Liquideep (Ghana) Sarkodie (South Africa) Mafikizolo
