= Laxio Beats =

Ghanaian record producer

- Born: Bernard Antwi Darko; February 28, 1987 (age 39); Kumasi, Ghana
- Genres: Gospel, Afro-pop, R&B, Hip hop, Afrobeat, Highlife, Hiplife
- Occupation: Record producer
- Instruments: Keyboard; music sequencer; drum machine; synthesizer; sampler; beatboxing; vocals
- Years active: 2010–present

Bernard Antwi-Darko, better known as Laxio Beats, is a Ghanaian record producer and composer. He is best known for the production of Ghanaian rapper Guru's hit single akayida in 2013.

== Early life, music career ==
Laxio Beats, the youngest of seven siblings, was born February 28, 1987, at Kumasi. He started his music career as the entertainment prefect for his high school. In 2013 he produce “akayida”, which won the 2014 Ghana music awards for hiplife song of the year.

== Production credits ==
- Geesus – "Kisses for Breakfast" ft Stonebwoy
- Phootprintz – "Forgetti" ft Laxio Beats
- TicTac – "Don't Let Go"
- Revy – "Prepaid"
- Guru – "Akayida"
- Criss Waddle – "Girls Abr3"
- Just-Ice – "Hold It"
- Echo – "Akuaba"
- Rebbel Ashes and Ajoejoe – "Mene Woa"
- Akoo Nana – "Nahna Nahna"
- Preachers – "Meyi W'aye"
- Keche – "Body Lotion"
- Bisa Kdeix Sarkodiex phootprintz – "Jackie Appiah"
- Iyanya – "Don't Fear"
- Jeff Spain – "Higher"
