= Sexy Steel =

Nigerian designer, stylist, actor, musician, and entrepreneur

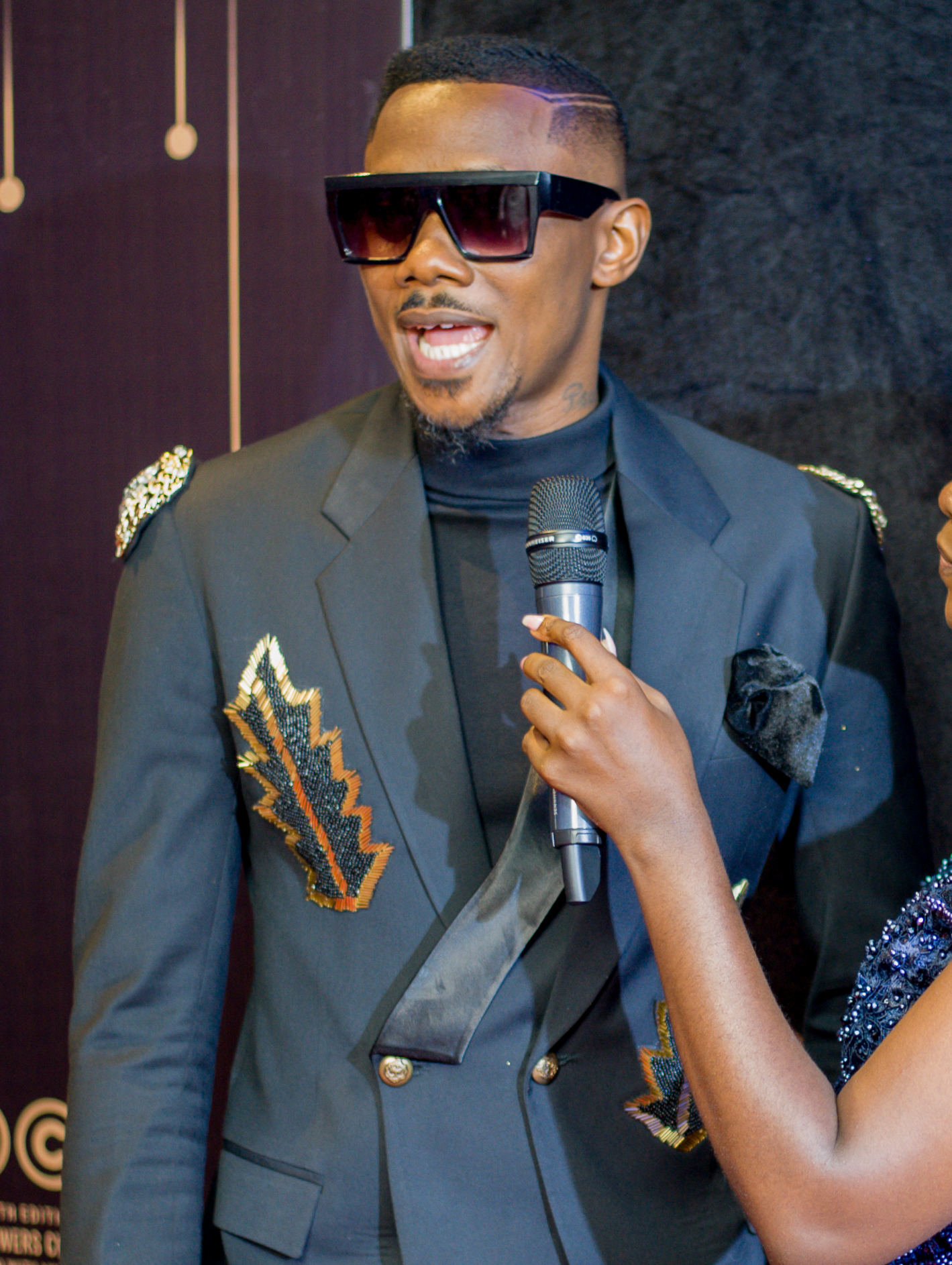
- Sexy steel at AMVCA 2020

Background information
- Born: Abbey Chile Abuede; Lagos
- Origin: Delta State, Nigeria
- Genres: Afrobeats
- Occupations: singer; songwriter; performer; performer; actor; stylist
- Years active: 2009 – present

Abbey Chile Abuede// professionally known as Sexy Steel, is a Nigerian designer, stylist, actor, musician, and entrepreneur. In 2012, his song Bebedi Alhaja won the awards for Best Video of the Year, Best Video Director and Best Indigenous Concept at the Nigerian Music Video Awards (NMVA).

== Early life ==
Sexy Steel was born in Lagos State, southwest Nigeria to Chief Kehinde Abuede, a former chairman of Oshodi Isolo Local Government Council. He is from Oshimili North Local Government Area of Delta State, in southern Nigeria. He grew up in Lagos with his siblings and had his secondary education at Maryland Comprehensive School in Lagos after which he went to The Polytechnic, Ibadan, where he graduated with a degree in Fine arts.

== Career ==
=== Music career ===
While at college, Sexy Steel performed in the music group, High Profile, until his discovery by Tony Nwakalor, the founder of Yes Records in 2009. He signed a recording contract with Yes Records and released his debut album, Cumbersome on the label, the album included the songs South African Girl, Taka Sufe and Omoge Wajo.

In 2012, after his recording contract with Yes Records expired, he released the single Bebedi Alhaja, which won three awards at the Nigerian Music Video Awards, including the award for Best Video of the Year. In 2013, Sexy Steel released another single Mambo, which featured leading Nigerian singer Iyanya to relative success. In 2015, Sexy Steel released the single Sisi produced by Young John, which enjoyed massive airplay, and he quickly followed it up with a remix in 2016 featuring rapper Olamide and Tekno.

=== Film career ===
In 2013, Sexy Steel was cast in the movie Playing Safe alongside Ini Edo, Tonto Dikeh and IK Ogbonna. He then went on to star in the Funke Akindele-produced Awa Okunrin as well as Ayo Makun's 10 Days in Sun City and Merry Men, for which he also wrote the motion picture title soundtrack.

=== Other ventures ===
Sexy Steel has taken part in several soccer competitions including the MTN/SuperSport Celebrity football competition, Nollywood vs Super Eagles, Nigerian Comedians vs Artistes competition and the Powerball Football Competition. He licensed a clothing line, Needdle and Stitches and was won a number of Fashion awards, including the Imperial Integrated Project Award for Fashion and Youth Empowerment, Nigerian Designers Fashion Award for Best Fashion Designer and was named the Most Fashionable Music Star (Male) at the 2015 Lagos Fashion Awards.

== Awards and recognition ==
| Year | Event | Prize | Recipient | Result |
|---|---|---|---|---|
| 2012 | Nigerian Music Video Awards | Best Video of the Year | Bebedi Alhaja | Won |
| 2012 | Nigerian Music Video Awards | Best Video Director | Bebedi Alhaja | Won |
| 2012 | Nigerian Music Video Awards | Best Indigenous Concept | Bebedi Alhaja | Won |

== Discography ==
=== Albums ===
| Album title | Album details |
|---|---|
| Cumbersome | Released: 2010; Label: Yes Records; Formats: Digital download, Compact Disc |

=== Singles ===
| Single Title | Single Details |
|---|---|
| Omoge | Released: 2011; Label: Sexy Steel; Formats: Digital download |
| Bebedi Alhaja | Released: 2012; Label: Sexy Steel; Format: Digital Download |
| Sisi | Released: 2015; Label: Sexy Steel; Format: Digital Download |
| Sisi – Remix | Released: 2016 (featuring Olamide & Tekno); Label: Sexy Steel; Format: Digital Download |
| Marie Joana | Released: 2017; Label: Sexy Steel; Format: Digital Download |
| I'm in Love | Released: 2018; Label: Sexy Steel; Format: Digital Download |
| Merry Men (Yoruba Demons) | Released: 2018 (Movie Soundtrack); Label: Sexy Steel; Format: Digital Download |
| Ishe Kanaa Nii | Released: 2018 (featuring 9yce); Label: Sexy Steel; Format: Digital Download |
| Faraway | Released: 2019 (featuring Zlatan Ibile); Label: Sexy Steel; Format: Digital Download |
| Merry Men (Yoruba Demons) | Released: 2018 (Movie Soundtrack); Label: Sexy Steel; Format: Digital Download |
