= Kukere =

2011 single by Iyanya

Single by Iyanya

from the album Desire
- Released: 23 November 2011
- Recorded: 2010–11
- Genre: Afrobeats
- Length: 3:43
- Label: Made Men Music Group
- Songwriter: Iyanya Mbuk
- Producer: D'Tunes

Iyanya singles chronology
"Iyanya (My Story)" (2009)	"Kukere" (2011)	"Ur Waist" (2012)

Music video
- "Kukere" on YouTube

"Kukere" (Efik: "Don't think/worry") is a song by Nigerian singer Iyanya, released by Made Men Music Group on 23 November 2011. It serves as the lead single from his second studio album, Desire (2013). Upon release, the song peaked at number one on Top FM's May Chart, Soundcity's Viewers Choice, Rhythm FM, and The Beat 99.9 FM's Blackberry Top Ten Countdown. Moreover, it peaked at number two on Radio Port Harcourt. "Kukere" won Hottest Single of the Year at 2013 Nigeria Entertainment Awards and Best Pop Single at The Headies 2012.

== Background ==
During a visit to his hometown of Calabar, Iyanya noticed that the Etighi dance lacked a signature track. Wanting to bring the dance to a wider audience, he collaborated with producer D'Tunes to create "Kukere".

CEO Dancers performed the song during their performance on Britain's Got Talent. Cokobar and Iyanya organized the Kukere Queen Competition in order to better promote the album in London. The competition required participants to submit a dancing video of themselves along with three justifications for why they should win.

== Accolades ==
Year	Awards ceremony	Award description(s)	Results	Ref
2013	Nigeria Entertainment Awards	Hottest Single of the Year	Won	
2013	City People Entertainment Awards	Most Popular Song of the Year	Nominated	
2012	Nigerian Music Video Awards	Best Contemporary Afro	Nominated	
2012	The Headies	Best Pop Single	Won	
2012	The Headies	Song of the Year	Nominated	

== Kukere (Remix) ==
"Kukere (Remix)"

Remix by Iyanya featuring D'banj

from the album Desire
- Released: 20 August 2012
- Recorded: 2012
- Genre: Afrobeats
- Length: 4:28
- Label: Made Men Music Group
- Songwriters: Iyanya Mbuk; Dapo Oyebanjo
- Producer: D'Tunes

Iyanya chronology
"Ur Waist" (2012)	"Kukere (Remix)" (2012)	"Flavour" (2012)

D'banj chronology
"Tony Montana (Remix)" (2012)	"Kukere (Remix)" (2012)	"Bachelor" (2012)

Audio video
- "Kukere (Remix)" on YouTube

The remix of "Kukere" was made available on August 20, 2012. It features vocals by D'banj and serves as the album's third single. The track reprises the original song's hook and instrumental.

=== Background ===
In an interview with Toolz, Iyanya said D'banj reached out to him to do the remix and that he was honored to work with the singer. Iyanya also stated that the remix would have a music video; however, the video was never made or filmed.

=== Critical reception ===
The remix of "Kukere" received positive reviews from music critics. Jaguda's Ayo Jaguda praised Iyanya for releasing "one of the biggest dance track ever made" and commended D'Tunes for "the crazy beat". Damilare Aiki of BellaNaija said the song "became a national anthem" after being released and that it was "a breath of fresh air". NotJustOk's Demola Ogundele characterized the song as a "huge national track" and commended both Iyanya and D'banj for recording the song.
