= Signature (Iyanya EP) =

EP by Iyanya
- Released: 30 March 2017
- Genre: Afropop; R&B; Afrobashment
- Length: 25:59
- Label: Mavin
- Producer: Don Jazzy (also exec.); Babyfresh; Altims

Iyanya chronology
Applaudise (2015)	Signature (2017)	For Your Love (2020)

Singles from Signature
- 1. "Up To Something" Released: 31 October 2016; 2. "Hold On" Released: 7 March 2017

Signature is the first EP by Nigerian singer Iyanya. It was released on 30 March 2017 by Mavin Records and features guest appearances from Mavin artists Don Jazzy, Dr Sid, and Poe. The EP's production was handled by in-house producers Don Jazzy, Babyfresh, and Altims.

== Background ==
On 11 July 2016, Iyanya made a post on Instagram announcing that he would release a new album under a new label, which led fans to believe that he was leaving Made Men Music Group. He later confirmed his departure from the label, which he had co-founded with Ubi Franklin, and said he planned to launch his own imprint. Reports at the time mentioned disagreements over the running of the label, including financial matters, but Franklin stated that Iyanya had his support and that the move was not a fallout. After leaving MMMG, Iyanya signed with Mavin Records, where he released Signature as his first project under the label.

== Singles ==
The EP's lead single "Up to Something" features Don Jazzy and Dr Sid. The release of the Don Jazzy-produced single coincided with Iyanya's signing to Mavin Records on 31 October 2016. The second single "Hold On" was released on 7 March 2017. The track was also produced by Don Jazzy.

== Composition ==
Signature is an eight-track EP that blends Afropop, R&B, and afrobashment styles. The opening track, "Odoyewu", combines romantic themes with upbeat melodies and religious undertones. "Baby Answer" and "Celebrate" continue the dance-focused sound present in Iyanya's earlier work. "Not Forgotten", featuring Poe, is a reflective track dedicated to Iyanya's late mother and departed friends. "Nobody Has to Know" and "Hold On" incorporate R&B and sensual themes, with production by Altims and Don Jazzy respectively. Don Jazzy produced four of the eight songs on the EP.

== Critical reception ==
Joey Akan of Pulse Nigeria said that although Signature didn't offer "the life changing power packed project that we all expected," it provided "a new run of the familiar 'It's Iyaaaaanya' signature tag, and reminding us that he has more than enough juice in the tank to still keep his head above the doom merchants and pessimists." Jim Donnett of tooXclusive called Signature a "finely executed project” and noted that Iyanya "brings it all to bear" while "basking all over with glee" in his performance. He remarked that the EP "reminds us all the other good ways Iyanya can be" and concluded that with continued focus, "it's gonna work out on the long run."

In a review for Filter Free, Chiagoziem Onyekwena said Signature was a "cohesive listen" with "underlying consistency" and that Iyanya's work on the EP "doesn’t sacrifice cohesion" for potential hits. He remarked that the project showed Iyanya as "much more than" his sex appeal and past successes, calling it a 'splendid job" overall. He gave the EP a rating of 68%. Oris Aigbokhaevbolo, a writer for Music in Africa, saw Signature as a disappointing project that fell short of expectations, criticizing Iyanya for playing it safe and delivering songs that felt like leftovers from his previous album. While a few tracks like "Up To Something" and "Celebrate" stood out, much of the EP lacked depth, with attempts at emotional or sensual material coming off as awkward or misguided. Aigbokhaevbolo concluded: "Iyanya's Signature isn't one of them. It is a passable project, but where more was expected, Iyanya has delivered less."

== Track listing ==
Signature track listing
No.	Title	Writer(s)	Producer(s)	Length
1.	"Odoyewu"	Iyanya Mbuk	Don Jazzy	4:02
2.	"Hold On"	Mbuk	Don Jazzy	3:09
3.	"Baby Answer"	Mbuk; Biam Cupa	Babyfresh	3:22
4.	"Not Forgotten" (featuring Poe)	Mbuk; Ladipo Eso	Altims	3:43
5.	"Celebrate"	Mbuk	Babyfresh	2:38
6.	"Nobody Has to Know"	Mbuk	Altims	2:47
7.	"Bow for You"	Mbuk	Don Jazzy	2:48

Bonus tracks
No.	Title	Writer(s)	Producer(s)	Length
8.	"Up to Something" (featuring Don Jazzy and Dr Sid)	Mbuk; Michael Ajereh; Sidney Esiri	Don Jazzy	3:27
Total length:				25:59

== Personnel ==
- Don Jazzy – production (tracks 1, 2, 7, 8)
- Babyfresh – production (tracks 3, 5)
- Altims – production (tracks 4, 6), mixing/mastering (tracks 1, 4, 6)
- DJ Coublon – mixing/mastering (track 3)
- Seanstan – mixing/mastering (track 7)
- Bigfoot – mixing/mastering (track 5)

== Release history ==
Release history and formats for Signature
Region	Date	Format	Label
Various	30 March 2017	Digital download	Mavin
