= Suntan Beach, Badagry =

Beach in Badagry

Coordinates: 6°23′31″N 2°50′00″E

Suntan Beach
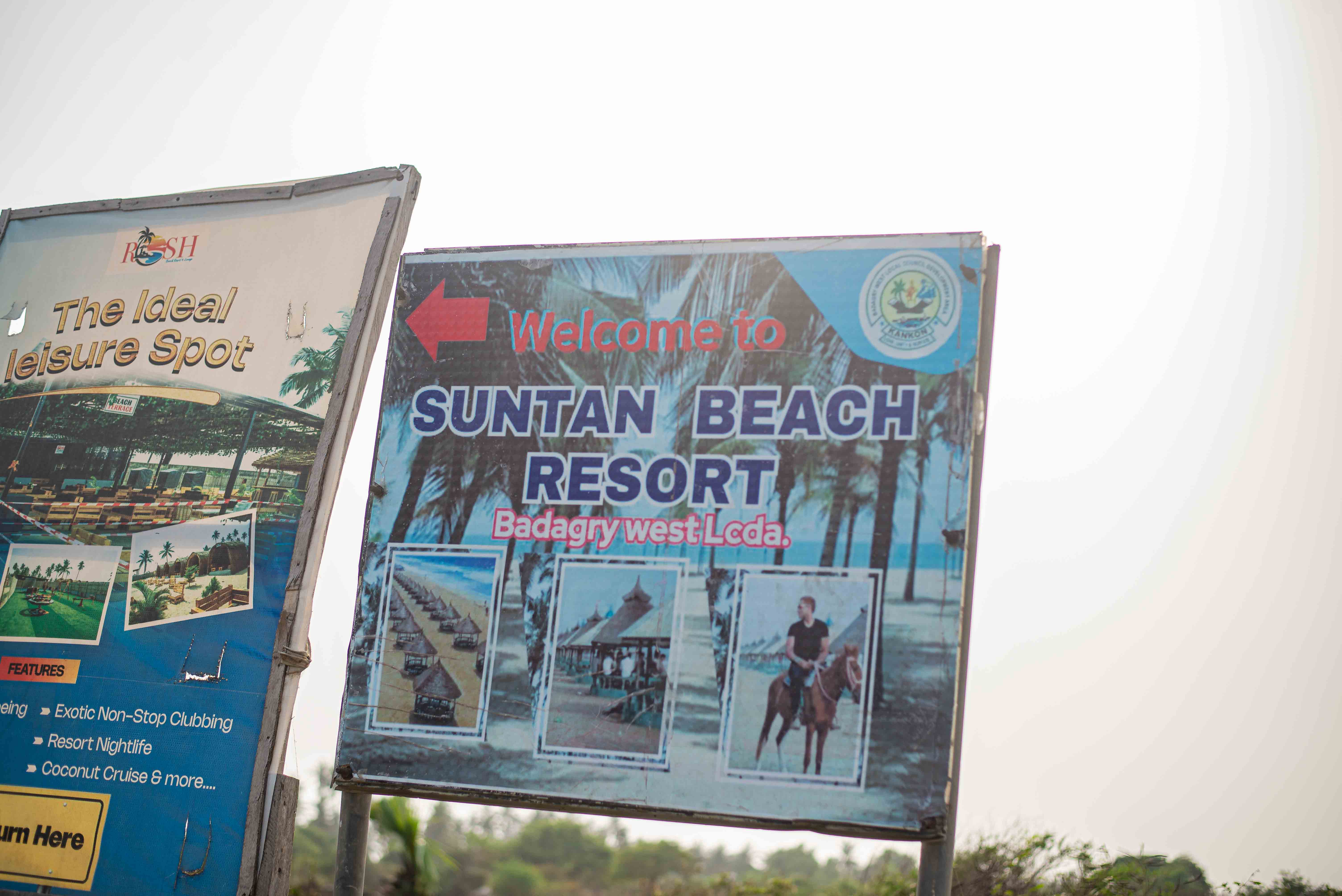
- Interactive map of Suntan Beach
- Ideal Areas for: Swimming Diving/Snorkeling Surfing Wind-surfing
- Lifeguards: Available
- Safety: For All Ages

Suntan Beach in Badagry, Lagos State, is a quiet coastal spot lined with coconut trees and soft sand, offering a relaxed atmosphere away from the busy city. It's a place where people come to enjoy the ocean breeze, take walks along the shore, or simply unwind. The beach is popular for casual outings, with visitors playing beach games, riding horses, or just sitting by the water. Local vendors sell food and handmade crafts, adding to the laid-back experience. Though it faces challenges like waste management and erosion, efforts are sometimes made to keep it clean. Suntan Beach remains a favorite spot for those looking to enjoy the natural beauty of Badagry's coastline.
