= Flavor (Iyanya song) =

2012 single by Iyanya

Single by Iyanya

from the album Desire
- Released: 10 November 2012
- Recorded: 2012
- Genre: Highlife; pop
- Length: 4:18
- Label: Made Men Music Group
- Songwriter: Iyanya Mbuk
- Producer: D'Tunes

Iyanya singles chronology
"Ur Waist" (2012)	"Flavor" (2012)	"Sexy Mama" (2013)

Music video
- "Flavor" on YouTube

"Flavor" (also spelt "Flavour") is a song recorded by Nigerian singer Iyanya for his second studio album, Desire (2013). It was released as the record's third commercial single on 10 November 2012 through Made Men Music Group, a record label he co-owns with his manager, Franklin Ube. Written by the singer and produced by long-time collaborator D'Tunes, "Flavor" is a highlife and pop-influenced song. It features Iyanya questioning his lover through repetitive lyrics.

The single received generally positive reviews from contemporary music critics; a reviewer from Pulse congratulated Iyanya's grooviness while another provided an explanation for its success. An accompanying music video for "Flavor" was released on 24 December 2012 and features the singer performing and dancing through a shopping centre and a nightclub in London. Iyanya has also performed the single on several occasions, including on his 2013 promotional tours for Desire.

== Background and composition ==
"Flavor" was first released on 10 November 2012 as the third single from his then-upcoming second studio album, Desire (2013); a version of the song featuring non-explicit lyrics was released a few months later on 6 March, also in 2013. Made Men Music Group covered the release, which the singer co-owned with his manager, Franklin Ube. In an interview with Vanguard, Iyanya noted that the track, in addition to a majority of the parent record, was inspired by his enjoyment of writing about his feelings in love songs; he also described that "Flavor" was one of his compositions to fall under the pop genre, following "Kukere" and "Ur Waist". Written by the singer and produced solely by long-time collaborator D'Tunes, "Flavor" is a song influenced by the Highlife genre. In the recording's lyrics, Iyanya is revealed as a man who is constantly questioning his lover's motives. Through the use of a "funkified" melody and beats, and the large addition of strings, the singer performs several of its lyrics repetitively: "Omoge, what's your flavor? / Omoge, what's your flavor?".

== Critical reception ==
"Flavor" was generally well received by contemporary music critics. A reviewer from Pulse was positive towards "Flavor" and claimed that it was unlikely that a fan of Iyanya has not yet "grooved" to the track. Additionally, Olumide Adesida stated that this led to the single being heavily played on Nigerian radio. Don Boye from tooXclusive claimed that the single proved Iyanya "is ending 2013 on a high note".

=== Accolades ===
The music video for "Flavor" was nominated for "Most Gifted Male Video" at the 2013 Channel O Music Video Awards. However, Iyanya lost to Tswana rapper Zeus for his 2013 single "#DatsWassup", featuring musicians Aka and Tumi.

Year	Awards ceremony	Award description(s)	Results
2013	Channel O Music Video Awards	Most Gifted Male Video	Nominated

== Promotion ==
The accompanying music video for the single was shot in London by Moe Musa. It was released on 24 December 2012 through Iyanya's official YouTube account. The video commences with footage from the live concert in which he asks the audience: "It's getting really hot in here, can I take my shirt off?". Several scenes display the singer loitering around a shopping centre, dancing in a nightclub, and driving around the city at night. He is also shown dancing with various female companions and hugging a few of his friends. The visual ends with Iyanya drinking vodka around the aforementioned ladies. Boye appreciated the clip and Iyanya for ending the year off right.

In 2013, Iyanya performed "Flavor" for the first time at a concert in Vancouver, British Columbia, Canada to promote Desire. The promotion business Cokobar helped fund the tour in collaboration with the singer's record label, Made Men Music Group. During the Music Festival Lagos 2015, held in Lagos, Nigeria, Iyanya performed "Flavor" in addition to the album tracks "Gift" and "Sexy Mama". Ayomide O. Tayo from the Nigerian publication Pulse noted that his female fans in the crowd were delighted by both his appearance and the performance.
