= Sho Lee =

Single by Sean Tizzle

Single by Sean Tizzle
- Released: February 23, 2013
- Recorded: 2013
- Genre: Afro pop
- Length: 3:54
- Label: Difference Entertainment
- Songwriter: Oluwaseun Oluwabamidele Morihanfen
- Producer: D'Tunes

Sean Tizzle singles chronology
"Sho Lee" (2013)	"Boogie Down" (2013)

"Sho Lee" is a song by Nigerian recording artist Sean Tizzle. The song was produced by Nigerian producer D'Tunes and it was nominated for Song of the Year. D'Tunes won Producer of the Year at The Headies 2013 for the single.

== Live performances ==
Sean Tizzle performed "Sho Lee" on stage at the Indigo2 during the Cokobar Music Festival.

== Accolades ==
Year	Awards ceremony	Award description(s)	Results
2013	The Headies 2013	Song of the Year	Nominated
2013	The Headies 2013	Producer of the Year (D'Tunes)	Won

== Press releases ==
There were some issues surrounding Sean Tizzle and Sound Sultan. These issues arose as a result of Sean Tizzle's switch from Sound Sultan's music label Naija Ninjas to D'Tunes' label Difference Entertainment.

Sound Sultan claims he wrote “Sho Lee” while he was hosting his “MyTop10″ edition on Kennis Music Channel. If this is true then more credit should be given to songwriters for their involvement in any song. This right here is a pretty bad look for the Nigerian industry.

== Release history ==
Region	Date	Format	Label
Worldwide	February 23, 2013	Digital download	Difference Entertainment

== Covers and remixes ==
- Digital download
1. "Sho Lee" (Yemi Sax) - 3:56
2. "Sho Lee" (Giftty) - 4:02
3. "Fever" (Foster) - 4:03
4. "Show Me" (MK60) - 3:13
5. "Ishi Olee" (H2O) - 4:08
6. "Skodo" (LMG) - 3:45
