= Durosoke =

Single by Olamide

from the album Baddest Guy Ever Liveth
- Released: 1 May 2013
- Recorded: 2013
- Genre: Hip hop
- Length: 4:20
- Label: YBNL Nation
- Songwriter: Olamide
- Producer: Pheelz

Olamide singles chronology
"Confession Aiye" (2013)	"Durosoke" (2013)	"Turn Up" (2013)

Music video
- "Durosoke" on YouTube

"Durosoke" (Yoruba: "Stay Up") is a song by Nigerian hip hop recording artist Olamide. It was released as the lead single from his third studio album, Baddest Guy Ever Liveth (2013). Written by Olamide and produced by Pheelz, the song is mid tempo Yoruba track. "Durosoke" was nominated for Song of the Year and Best Rap Single at the 2013 edition of The Headies. The music video for "Durosoke" won Best Afro Hip Hop Video and was nominated for Video of the Year at the 2013 Nigeria Music Video Awards.

== Music video ==
The accompanying music video for "Durosoke" was filmed in Nigeria by Clarence Peters. It was exclusively released on Star Music, a music platform established by Star Lager in February 2013. Olamide was excited about releasing the song and expressed that in an interview. His camp didn't reveal any details about the video and left fans speculating about its concept.

== Critical reception ==
Upon its release, the song was met with positive reviews. Onos O of BellaNaija commented on the single, saying: "On "Durosoke", he takes a hint from Davido as he drops some gibberish in the hook. And for those who don't understand Yoruba, everything sounds like gibberish anyway but Olamide always comes through with the swag."

A writer for OyaMagazine gave the song 7 out of 10 stars, adding that "Durosoke, despite being sung largely in Yoruba Language is popular even among those who don't understand a word in the language. Olamide's originality stood out in this song, he shows us that he needs not struggle with lyrics as he does his thing in his mother's tongue. The beat isn't the fast-tempo one common in Nigerian dance tracks of today."

A writer for Pulse said that "the video is a departure from the usual party/club scene type video which would have been the norm for such a hit track. Clarence instead chooses to tell a story of sorts, albeit a quirky one. Just like the track, we foresee this video remaining on the charts for several weeks to come."

== Accolades ==
Year	Awards ceremony	Award description(s)	Results
2013	Nigeria Music Video Awards	Video of the Year	Nominated
2013	Nigeria Music Video Awards	Best Afro Hip Hop Video	Won
2013	The Headies 2013	Best Rap Single	Nominated
2013	The Headies 2013	Song of the Year	Nominated
