= Tewa Onasanya =

Nigerian Entrepreneur

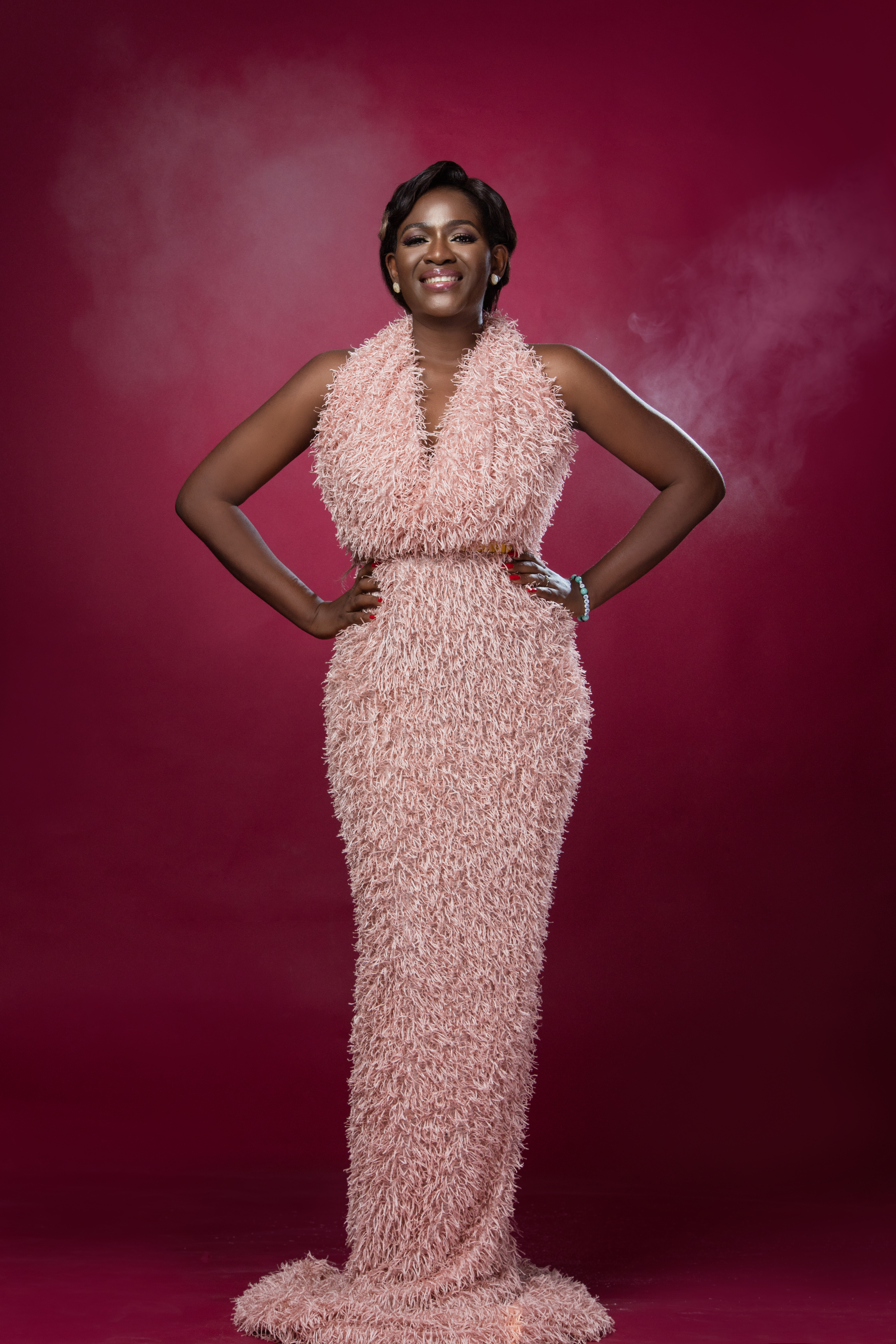
- Born: London
- Education: University of Portsmouth
- Occupations: Publisher, mindset stylist
- Known for: Founder of Exquiste Magazine

Tewa Onasanya is a British-Nigerian publisher, mindset stylist, philanthropist and the Founder/CEO of Exquisite Magazine Services Ltd, the publishers of Exquisite Magazine and the organisers of EMAC Walk and ELOY Awards. She was 40 years old as of 2018.

== Personal life ==
Onasanya was born and raised in London. She moved to the outskirt of London after she got married and has two children. She holds Bachelor of Science degree in Pharmacology from the University of Portsmouth, United Kingdom.

== Career ==
Although she studied pharmacology, she has always loved writing and finally ventured into it in September 2003 when she started Exquisite magazine – a fashion, beauty and lifestyle magazine for women which is also behind Exquisite Magazine Walk against Cancer (EMAC Walk) - an event aimed at increasing awareness of cervical and breast cancer and free screening for people and ELOY Awards created in 2009 which so far has awarded about 170 women
