= Baba Dee =

Nigerian musical artist

Baba Dee Dare Fasasi
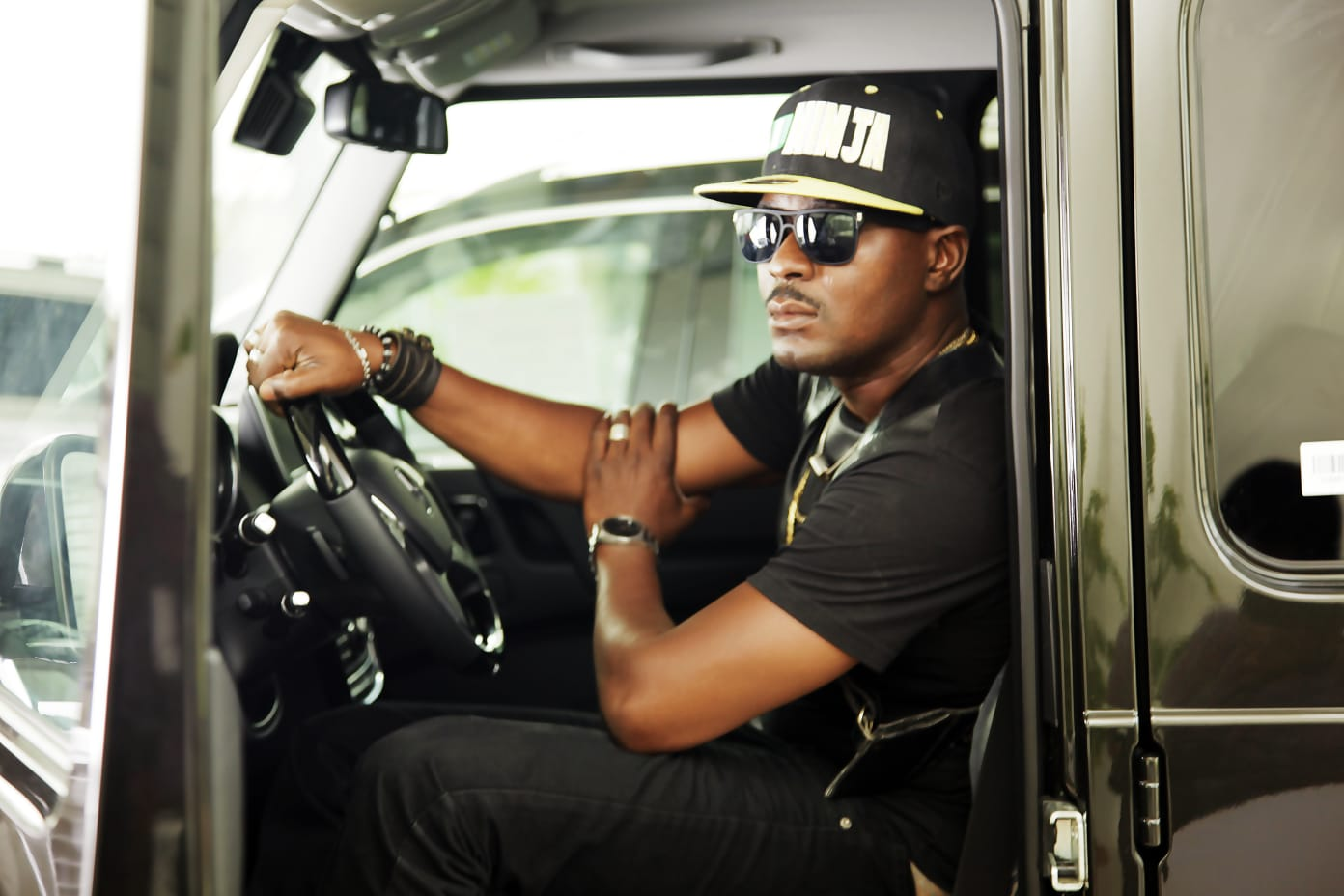

Background information
- Occupations: Movie director, dancehall artiste
- Years active: 1995 - present

Dare Fasasi, known professionally as Baba Dee, is a Swedish-Nigerian movie director, and dancehall artiste. He was the older brother of Nigerian singer-songwriter, Sound Sultan, with whom he founded a record label named Naija Ninja Entertainment Production Company. Baba Dee's music career began with the release of his debut album in 1997.

== Education and career ==
Baba Dee earned a bachelor's degree in theatre arts from the University of Ibadan, and a master's degree in directing for stage and feature film. His first shot at music was the Lekki Splash Talent Hunt where he competed against nine other contestants and won in 1995. His win also included a recording contract that ushered him into Nigeria's music industry, after which he secured another recording contract with Astro Entertainment in Sweden, by which he toured Europe with other artistes.

In a 2014 interview, he revealed that he doesn't use sex in promoting his music.

Baba Dee directed his first movie, Head Gone, in 2014. The movie, which was co-produced with his younger brother, Sound Sultan, featured Nigerian singer Tuface, Alibaba Akpobome, Basketmouth, Eniola Badmus, Akpororo, among others. Head Gone also premiered in Sweden and Berlin in 2014, and is reportedly the first Nollywood film made by a Swedish director.

In 2013, Baba Dee revealed his intention to contest for membership of the Lagos State House of Assembly, Oriade Amuwo Odofin Constituency 2, in Nigeria's 2015 General Election. He was also a member of the board of the Copyright Society of Nigeria.

== Personal life ==
Baba Dee was the older brother to Nigerian singer and instrumentalist, Sound Sultan, who died on 11 July 2021.

At a tribute to his late brother in July 2021, he tried to reconcile twin brothers Peter Okoye and Paul Okoye, a music duo of the defunct P-Square who had been feuding.

He has a son of mixed race named Tunde Vahlberg Fasasi.

== Filmography ==
- Head Gone (2014) - Director

== Discography ==
Studio albums

- Stand 4 Road (2018)
- Boom Box (2014)
- Versatile (2007)
- Most Wanted (1997)

Singles & EPs

- "Daggarin" feat. Jaycii (2019)
- "All About You" (2017)

== Awards and nominations ==
Year	Award	Category	Work	Result	Ref
2007	The Headies	Best Reggae/Dancehall Album	Versatile	Won	
2013	The Headies	Best Reggae/Dancehall Single	"Go Down"	Nominated	
