= Emma Nyra =

American singer (born 1988)

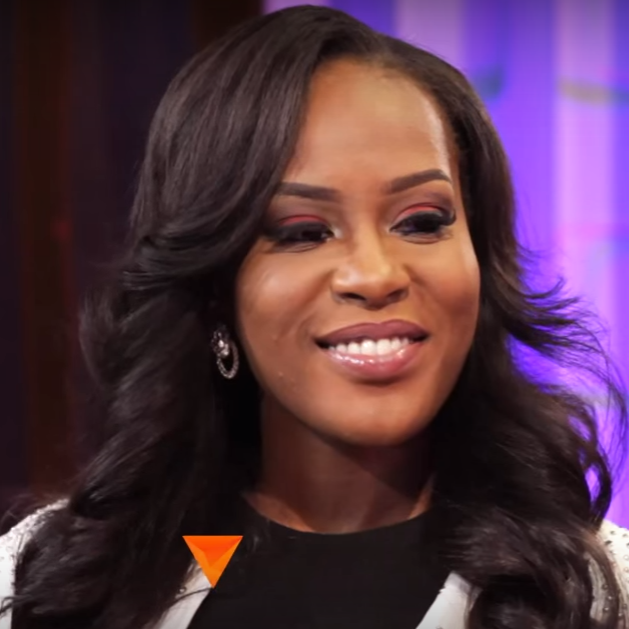
- Emma Nyra on ndanitv
- Born: Emma Chukwugoziam Obi; July 18, 1988 (age 38); Tyler, Texas, U.S
- Education: Texas Southern University
- Occupations: Singer; model; actress
- Children: 2
- Musical career
- Genres: Afropop, soul, R&B
- Instrument: Vocals
- Years active: 2011–present
- Label: Independent
- Website: emmanyra.com

Emma Chukwugoziam Obi (born July 18, 1988), professionally known as Emma Nyra, is a Nigerian-American singer, songwriter, actress, and model. Her associate acts include Iyanya, Selebobo, Davido, Cynthia Morgan, Victoria Kimani, and Patoranking.

== Early life ==
Emma Nyra was born and raised in Tyler, Texas, where she had her early education. She is of Igbo descent from Delta State, located in the south-southern region of Nigeria. In 2012, she left for Nigeria to pursue a career in music and modelling.

== Education ==
She is an alumna of Texas Southern University, where she graduated with a degree in Health Care Administration.

== Career ==
=== Music ===
Emma Nyra released her debut singles titled "Do It" and "Everything I Do" in 2011 while in the U.S. Upon her return to Nigeria in 2012, she started working with D'Tunes and Iyanya who she had met in 2010 while in the U.S. In March 2012, she signed a recording contract with Made Men Music Group before she went on to make her first major debut in the Nigerian music industry. After that she made a vocal appearance in Iyanya's "Ur Waist".

In 2013, Emma Nyra was voted the "Most Promising Act to Watch" at the 2013 edition of the Nigeria Entertainment Awards. Emma Nyra went on to release several singles which saw her touring the United States and Canada between 2013 and 2014. She has worked with the likes of Davido, Patoranking, and Olu Maintain among others. In 2015, Emma Nyra was listed on "notJustOk's" list of 15 Artists to Watch in 2015. Her debut studio album titled Emma Nyra Hot Like Fiya Vol. 1 is yet to be released.

=== Film ===
Apart from music, Emma Nyra is also an actress. She has appeared in films such as American Driver, Rebound, and The Re-Union.

== Exit from Made Men Music ==
In 2014, Emma Nyra ended her recording contract with Made Men Music Group. While the press hinted on relationship issues, Emma Nyra cited "abuse with physical and verbal force" from her then manager Ubi Franklin as the reason why she left the label imprint. The allegations were however denied by Ubi Franklin.

== Discography ==
=== Studio albums ===
List of studio albums, with selected chart positions
Title	Album details	Peak chart positions				Certifications	Sales
Title	Album details	NGR	RSA	GHA	UK	Certifications	Sales
Love Vs. Money, Vol. 1	Released: August 3, 2016; Label: Nyra Nation; Format: CD, digital download	–	—	—	—		
"—" denotes a recording that did not chart or was not released in that territory.

=== Compilation albums ===
List of studio albums, with selected chart positions
Title	Album details	Peak chart positions				Certifications	Sales
Title	Album details	NGR	RSA	GHA	UK	Certifications	Sales
The Evolution (with Made Men Music Group)	Released: May 29, 2014; Label: Made Men Music; Format: CD, digital download	–	—	—	—		
"—" denotes a recording that did not chart or was not released in that territory.

=== Singles ===
As lead artist

List of singles as lead artist, with selected chart positions and certifications, showing year released and album name
Title	Year	Peak chart positions							Certifications	Album
Title	Year	NGA	GHA	RSA	AUS	UK	US	US R&B/HH	Certifications	Album
"Do It" (featuring Eno Will)	2011	–	–	—	—	—	—	—		Non-album singles
"Everything I Do"	2011	–	–	—	—	—	—	—		Non-album singles
"Everything I Do" (featuring Iyanya)	2012	–	–	—	—	—	—	—		Non-album singles
"Ori Mi Wu"	2012	–	–	—	—	—	—	—		Non-album singles
"Kere Shere"	2013	–	–	—	—	—	—	—		Non-album singles
"Elele" (featuring Davido)	2014	–	–	—	—	—	—	—		Non-album singles
"For Your Matter"	2014	–	–	—	—	—	—	—		Non-album singles
"For Your Matter (Remix)" (featuring Patoranking)	2015	–	–	—	—	—	—	—		Non-album singles
"—" denotes a recording that did not chart or was not released in that territory.

Promotional singles

List of singles as lead artist, with selected chart positions and certifications, showing year released and album name
Title	Year	Peak chart positions							Certifications	Album
Title	Year	NGA	GHA	RSA	AUS	UK	US	US R&B/HH	Certifications	Album
"Say Yeah" (TripleMG featuring Iyanya, Emma Nyra, Tekno Miles, Selebobo & Baci)	2014	–	–	—	—	—	—	—		The Evolution
"Amigo"	2014	–	–	—	—	—	—	—		Non-album singles
"Vex" (with Cynthia Morgan & Victoria Kimani)	2015	–	–	—	—	—	—	—		Non-album singles
"—" denotes a recording that did not chart or was not released in that territory.

== Filmography ==
- Rebound
- The Re-Union
- American Driver

== Awards and nominations ==
Year	Award ceremony	Prize	Result	Ref
2013	2013 Nigeria Entertainment Awards	Most Promising Act to Watch	Won	

== Personal life ==
In August 2018, Emma Nyra gave birth to twins, daughter Alexandria and son Alexander.
