= My Story (Iyanya album) =

Studio album by Iyanya
- Released: 4 October 2009
- Recorded: 2008–2009
- Genre: R&B; hip-hop; reggae
- Length: 57:34
- Label: CN Media
- Producer: ID Cabasa; OJB Jezreel; Tee-Y Mix; K-Solo

Iyanya chronology
My Story (2009)	Desire (2013)

Singles from My Story
- 1. "No Time"; 2. "Love Truly"; 3. "Iyanya (My Story)"

My Story is the debut studio album by Nigerian singer Iyanya, released by CN Media on 4 October 2009. The album's production was handled by ID Cabasa, OJB Jezreel, K-Solo and Tee-Y Mix. Artists featured on My Story include M.I, Faze, DJ Zeez, Bokwilla and Ugly.

== Background ==
Iyanya started recording the album after winning the inaugural season of Project Fame West Africa. My Story is predominantly R&B but contains elements of hip hop and reggae. On 4 October 2009, Iyanya launched the "Symphony of Iyanya", a concert dedicated to celebrating the album's release. The concert was held at Ultima Studios in Omole, Lagos.

== Singles ==
The Faze-assisted track "No Time" was released as the album's lead single. "Love Truly" was released as the album's second single. The music video for the song was recorded in Nigeria. "Iyanya (My Story)" was released as the album's third single; its music video was filmed in South Africa.

== Track listing ==
No.	Title	Length
1.	"Gbadun You" (featuring M.I)	3:49
2.	"Wise Up"	3:48
3.	"Gongon" (featuring Ugly)	3:45
4.	"Love Truly (Remix)" (featuring Bokwilla)	3:39
5.	"Iyanya (My Story)"	4:19
6.	"High"	3:57
7.	"Shaye" (featuring DJ Zeez)	4:02
8.	"Love You"	3:38
9.	"Skele"	3:57
10.	"Tile"	3:23
11.	"Love Truly"	3:36
12.	"No Time" (featuring Faze)	4:12
13.	"Forever"	4:11
14.	"Thank You"	3:21
15.	"Wise Up (Instrumental)"
Total length:		57:34

== Personnel ==
- Iyanya – primary artist
- M.I – featured artist
- Faze – featured artist
- DJ Zeez – featured artist
- Bokwilla – featured artist
- Ugly – featured artist
- Tee Y Mix – producer
- ID Cabasa – producer
- OJB Jezereel – producer
- K-Solo – producer
