= Etighi =

Nigerian dance

Etighi is a Nigerian dance. The etighi dance was founded by the Akwa Ibom people. The dance requires movement of the leg and the waist. The dance is known across Nigeria and popularly used by the Ibibio and Efik people where its origin began.

== Popularity ==
The dance has been used in several music videos in Nigeria and across the world. The dance became well known when Iyanya used the dance in his popular music video.
