= Jombolo =

Single by Iyanya featuring Flavour N'abania

from the album Desire
- Released: 12 June 2013
- Recorded: 2012
- Length: 3:36
- Label: Made Men Music Group
- Songwriters: Iyanya and Flavour N'abania
- Producer: GospelOnDeBeatz

Iyanya singles chronology
"Sexy Mama" (2013)	"Jombolo" (2013)	"Mr Oreo" (2014)

Music video
- "Jombolo" on YouTube

"Jombolo" is a song by Nigerian singer Iyanya. It was released as the sixth single from his second studio album, Desire (2013), and debuted at number one on 360nobs' Top 10 Most Downloaded Songs chart for the week of 21 July to 27 July 2013. The song was produced by GospelOnDeBeatz and features guest vocals by singer Flavour N'abania.

== Music video ==
The music video for "Jombolo" was directed by Sesan Ogunro and features numerous waist movement and beautiful women.

=== Accolades ===
The music video for "Jombolo" was nominated for Best High Life Video and Best Use of Choreography at the 2013 Nigeria Music Video Awards (NMVA). The video was also nominated for Most Gifted Afro Pop at the 2014 Channel O Music Video Awards.

== Track listing ==
Digital single

No.	Title	Writer(s)	Producer(s)	Length
1.	"Jombolo" (featuring Flavour N'abania)	Iyanya and Flavour N'abania	GospelOnDeBeatz	3:33
