= Sexy Mama =

2013 single by Iyanya

Single by Iyanya featuring Wizkid

from the album Desire
- Released: 6 February 2013
- Recorded: 2012
- Genre: Dance; dancehall
- Length: 3:41
- Label: Made Men Music Group
- Songwriters: Iyanya Mbuk; Ayodeji Balogun
- Producer: D'Tunes

Iyanya singles chronology
"Flavor" (2012)	"Sexy Mama" (2013)	"Jombolo" (2013)

Wizkid singles chronology
"The Matter" (2013)	"Sexy Mama" (2013)	"Lagos to Soweto" (2013)

"Sexy Mama" is a song recorded by Nigerian singer Iyanya featuring Wizkid for the former's second studio album, Desire (2013). It was issued to digital retailers as the album's fifth single on 6 February 2013, coinciding with the release of the parent album, through his label Made Men Music Group. Written by both of the two musicians, "Sexy Mama" was solely produced by D'Tunes. It is a dancehall and dance-inspired track that contains lyrics pertaining to a man's interest in a girl he met at a club.

The single received generally positive feedback from music critics, who favoured the track as one of Iyanya's best songs. "Sexy Mama" peaked at number one on Nigeria's "Official Naija Top Ten Chart", compiled by MTV Base. An accompanying music video was released on 26 April 2013 and features both of the artists performing the song and choreography amidst a white backdrop. The use of special effects prompted a nomination for "Best Use of Visual Effects" at the 2013 Nigeria Music Video Awards (NMVA). Iyanya has also performed the track on several occasions, including at various nightclubs.

== Background and composition ==
The release of "Sexy Mama" coincided with that of Iyanya's second studio album, Desire (2013). It was digitally released on 6 February 2013 through Made Men Music Group to the iTunes Store, while a version of "Sexy Mama" featuring non-explicit lyrics was released exactly one month later on 6 March.

A dance music and dancehall-inspired track, "Sexy Mama" was written by both Iyanya and Wizkid, while its production was handled by D'Tunes. Its lyrics revolve around a male protagonist developing interest in a woman he met at a dance club. Wizkid joyfully sings: "Girl your dance makes me crazy / I'm feeling your sexy waist / And this is still the baseline".

== Reception ==
"Sexy Mama" received a positive response from music critics. Joey Akan from Pulse called it one of Iyanya's best songs to date, while Okay Africa's Jacob Roberts-Mensah described it as one of "Nigeria's most infectious dance ballads". Similarly, Qazim Quedy from 360 Nobs declared it an "amazing track" and a "wonderful listen". On Nigeria's "Official Naija Top Ten Chart" for commercially released singles, "Sexy Mama" debuted at number eight on the list, for the week spanning 24–31 May 2013. It was Wizkid's second entry on the listing, following his 2012 single "Azonto". After spending nearly two months on the chart compiled by MTV Base, it reached the top position on 26 July of the same year.

== Promotion ==
An accompanying music video for "Sexy Mama" was released on 26 April 2013 through Iyanya's official YouTube account and later appeared on his verified Vevo account on 16 October 2013. The visual commences with the two artists standing in front of a white backdrop while several female dancers appear sporadically through the use of digital and animated effects. Because of this, the video itself was nominated at the 2013 Nigeria Music Video Awards (NMVA) for the "Best Use of Visual Effects" category, but lost to Sound Sultan's video for "Natural Something".

At a 2014 special event promoting Belvedere's new line of vodkas, the singer performed "Sexy Mama" and "Away" on a blue lit dance floor. During the Music Festival Lagos 2015, held in Lagos, Nigeria, Iyanya performed "Sexy Mama" as well as "Gift" and "Flavor".

=== Accolades ===
Year	Awards ceremony	Award description(s)	Results
2013	Nigeria Music Video Awards (NMVA)	Best Use of Visual Effects	Nominated

== Track listing ==
Digital download
No.	Title	Length
1.	"Sexy Mama (Clean)"	3:31

== Charts ==
Chart (2013)	Peak position
Nigeria (Official Naija Top Ten)	1
