= Ur Waist =

Single by Iyanya featuring Emma Nyra

from the album Desire
- B-side: "Kukere"; "Bust Me Brain"
- Released: 8 July 2012
- Recorded: 2012
- Genre: Pon Pon
- Length: 4:14
- Label: Made Men Music Group
- Producer: D'Tunes

Iyanya singles chronology
"Kukere" (2012)	"Ur Waist" (2012)	"Kukere Remix" (2012)

Emma Nyra singles chronology
"Ayanfe" (2012)	"Ur Waist" (2012)	"Everything I Do" (2012)

Music video
- "Ur Waist" on YouTube

"Ur Waist" is a song by Nigerian singer Iyanya. It features guest vocals by Emma Nyra and was released on 8 July 2012 as the second single from his second studio album, Desire (2013).

== Background and music video ==
In "Ur Waist", Iyanya made reference to Tonto Dikeh, Tiwa Savage, and Yvonne Nelson. During his freestyle on Tim Westwood's Crib Sessions, he switched from saying "Yvonne Nelson, I have your medicine" to saying "Yvonne Nelson, I lost your medicine."

The accompanying music video for "Ur Waist" was directed by Clarence Peters and filmed at Suntan Beach in Badagry. On August 23, 2012, a behind-the-scenes video from the video shoot was posted to YouTube.

== Accolades ==
"Ur Waist" was nominated for Best Pop Single and Song of the Year at The Headies 2013. Iyanya received a nomination for Best International Performance at the 2013 Soul Train Music Awards for "Ur Waist".

== Track listing ==
Digital single

No.	Title	Writer(s)	Producer(s)	Length
1.	"Ur Waist" (featuring Emma Nyra)	Iyanya Mbuk	DTunes	4:14
2.	"Kukere"	Mbuk	DTunes	4:14
3.	"Bust Me Brain"	Mbuk	DTunes	4:14
