= Iyanya =

Nigerian singer (born 1986)

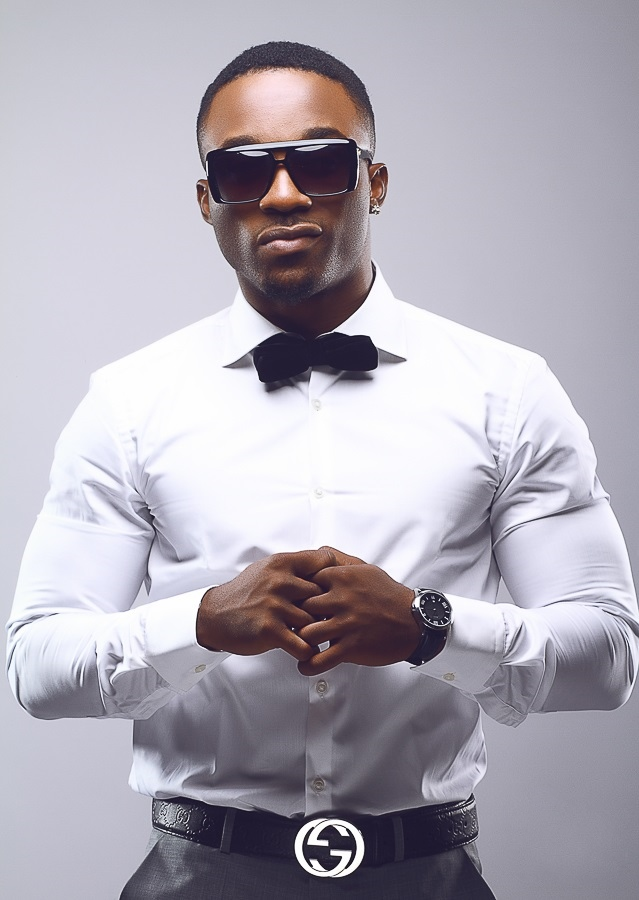
- Iyanya in 2013

Background information
- Born: Iyanya Onoyom Mbuk; 31 October 1986 (age 39); Calabar, Cross River State, Nigeria
- Genres: Afropop; Afrobeats; R&B
- Occupations: Singer; songwriter
- Years active: 2008–present
- Label: Temple Music Group

Iyanya Onoyom Mbuk (born 31 October 1986), known professionally as Iyanya, is a Nigerian singer and songwriter. Born and raised in Calabar, he gained recognition after winning the first season of Project Fame West Africa. Iyanya released his debut studio album, My Story, in October 2009. It was supported by the singles "No Time" and "Love Truly". He co-founded the record label Made Men Music Group with Ubi Franklin in 2011.

Iyanya's second studio album, Desire, was released in February 2013. It yielded the singles "Kukere", "Ur Waist", "Flavour", "Sexy Mama", and "Jombolo". Iyanya has won several awards, including Artist of the Year at The Headies 2013. In October 2016, he announced on Instagram that he signed a record deal with Mavin Records. Prior to signing with Mavin, he inked a management deal with Temple Management Company. Iyanya first announced his intentions to leave Made Men Music Group in July 2016. Applaudise (2015), Once Upon a Cat (2024), and The Forester's Son (2025) were released as his third, fourth, and fifth studio albums, respectively.

== Early life and education ==
Iyanya was born on 31 October 1986, in Calabar, Cross River State. His mother was a head mistress and his father was a forester. Iyanya has described his mother as the household disciplinarian, while his father was the gentler of the two. His parents both died in 2008, and his older brother died around the same time. Iyanya's grandfather was a clerygyman who owned a church. He began leading the children's choir at the church when he was five years old, and eventually joined the main choir.

Mbuk completed his primary, secondary, and university education in Calabar. He is a business management graduate from the University of Calabar.

== Career ==
=== 2009–2015: My Story and Desire ===
"Kukere" (2012)
A sample of "Kukere", Iyanya's single

After graduating from the University of Calabar, Iyanya worked in a hotel and sang karaoke at a local bar he managed. He also sang at Fiesta Fries Bar, Mirage Nite Club, and West-Life. Iyanya started as a rapper and went by the stage name Lofty. He was motivated to pursue music professionally after observing 2face Idibia and Olu Maintain. In 2008, KCee convinced him to participate in the first season of Project Fame West Africa. Iyanya won the competition after battling numerous people who had the same aspirations as him. Not long after winning Project Fame West Africa, he began recording his debut album, My Story, which was released by the imprint CN Media. The album showed Iyanya's versatility as an R&B artist, particularly on the tracks "Iyanya" and "Love Truly". My Story was a commercial failure due to problems with distribution and promotion.

After visiting his hometown and seeing people's affection for the Etighi dance, Iyanya decided to do a song that would popularize the dance, which originated in Calabar. He teamed up with record producer D'Tunes and recorded "Kukere", a song that won Hottest Single of the Year at the 2013 Nigeria Entertainment Awards and Best Pop Single at The Headies 2012. On 8 July 2012, Iyanya released the single "Ur Waist", which features vocals by Emma Nyra and was also produced by D'Tunes. At the 2013 Headies, "Ur Waist" earned nominations for Best Pop Single and Song of the Year. Iyanya was nominated for Best International Performance at the 2013 Soul Train Music Awards. On 25 November 2012, he performed at comedian Ayo Makun's INDIGO2 show. Iyanya performed at the Shrine in Chicago on 11 April 2013, and attended the launch of the African Muzik Magazine the next day. He serenaded Melanie Fiona at the LTB Jean store in SoHo, Manhattan, and performed at the New York Fashion Week.

To promote Desire in the UK, Iyanya headlined the Iyanya vs. Desire concert series, which were held in London and Manchester. The London gig was held at the INDIGO2 arena on 9 June 2013, and featured performances from Tonto Dikeh and Emma Nyra. The Manchester concert commenced five days later and featured performances from Emma Nyra and DRB Lasgidi. Iyanya and Nyra went on a mini tour across the US and Canada in early 2013. On 16 October 2013, 360Nobs reported that Iyanya became an ambassador for Solo Phones Nigeria, a mobile phone company located at the Computer Village market in Ikeja. The one-year deal was valued at $220,000 and included a 2014 Toyota Prado. In 2013, the Daily Independent newspaper reported that Iyanya also signed a one-year deal with Zinox Computers worth $300,000. Iyanya appeared in TV ads and on Zinox billboards as part of the arrangement.

=== 2016–present: MMMG Exit and Nigerian Idol ===
In 2016, Iyanya announced his exit from Made Men Music Group, a record label he co-founded with Ubi Franklin. He cited the desire to start his own label as the reason for leaving. Although Franklin publicly defended his choice and denied any controversy, reports indicated internal disagreements. Iyanya signed with Don Jazzy's Mavin Records after leaving Made Men and called the decision a "fresh start". His first release under the label, "Up 2 Sumting", features vocals by Don Jazzy and Dr Sid. The song was released on 31 October 2016, as the lead single and only bonus track from his debut EP Signature (2017). Pulse Nigeria's Princess Abumere called it "big boy music" and admitted that it was a powerful return for Iyanya, marking a change in his artistic orientation. "Up 2 Sumting" was nominated for Best Collabo at the 2017 Nigeria Entertainment Awards.

In 2025, Iyanya became a judge on Nigerian Idol.

== Artistry ==
Iyanya started performing ballads, particularly on his debut album My Story. In an interview with Toolz on Ndani TV, he said he considers himself to be a versatile artist and wants to be known for his R&B and Afrobeats abilities. He also said he switched from R&B to Afrobeats because he wanted to make money and wanted fans to see his versatility. Iyanya cited British singer Craig David and American singer R. Kelly as his key musical influences.

== Discography ==
Studio albums

- My Story (2009)
- Desire (2013)
- Applaudise (2015)
- Once Upon a Cat (2024)
- The Forester's Son (2025)

== Awards and nominations ==
Year	Event	Prize	Recipient	Result	Ref
2014	City People Entertainment Awards	Musician of the Year (Male)	Himself	Nominated	
2014	African Muzik Magazine Awards	Best Male West Africa	Himself	Nominated	
2014	African Muzik Magazine Awards	Best Dance in a Video	"Le Kwa Ukwu"	Won	
2014	World Music Awards	World's Best Song	"Away"	Nominated	
2014	World Music Awards	World's Best Song	"Le Kwa Ukwu"	Nominated	
2014	World Music Awards	World's Best Video	"Le Kwa Ukwu"	Nominated	
2014	World Music Awards	World's Best Male Artist	Himself	Nominated	
2014	World Music Awards	World's Best Live Act	Himself	Nominated	
2014	World Music Awards	World's Best Entertainer of The Year	Himself	Nominated	
2013	The Headies	Artist of the Year	Himself	Won	
2013	The Headies	Best R&B/Pop Album	Desire	Nominated	
2013	The Headies	Album of the Year	Desire	Nominated	
2013	The Headies	Best Pop Single	"Ur Waist"	Nominated	
2013	The Headies	Song of the Year	"Ur Waist"	Nominated	
2013	Nigeria Music Video Awards (NMVA)	Best High Life Video	"Jombolo" (Iyanya featuring Flavour N'abania)	Nominated	
2013	Nigeria Music Video Awards (NMVA)	Best Use of Choreography	"Jombolo" (Iyanya featuring Flavour N'abania)	—N/a	
2013	Nigeria Music Video Awards (NMVA)	Best Use of Visual Effects	"Sexy Mama" (Iyanya featuring Wizkid)	Nominated	
2013	Soul Train Music Awards	Best International Performance	"Ur Waist" (Iyanya featuring Emma Nyra)	Nominated	
2013	Channel O Music Video Awards	Most Gifted Male Video	"Flavour"	Nominated	
2013	Nigeria Entertainment Awards	Best Pop/R&B Artiste of the Year	Himself	Nominated	
2013	Nigeria Entertainment Awards	Hottest Single of the Year	"Kukere"	Won	
2013	Ghana Music Awards	African Artiste of the Year	Himself	Nominated	
2013	City People Entertainment Awards	Musician of the Year (Male)	Himself	Nominated	
2013	City People Entertainment Awards	Most Popular Song of the Year	"Kukere"	Nominated	
2012	Nigeria Music Video Awards (NMVA)	Best Contemporary Afro (Live Beats choice)	"Kukere"	Nominated	
2012	The Headies	Best Pop Single	"Kukere"	Won	
2012	The Headies	Song of the Year	"Kukere"	Nominated	

== Films and television ==
Television
Year	Title	Role	Notes	Ref
2013	Shuga (Season 3)	Himself	Cameo appearance	
2025	Nigerian idol	Himself	Judge, Season 10	
