= Ubi Franklin =

Nigerian music artist manager, politician, entrepreneur and TV show host

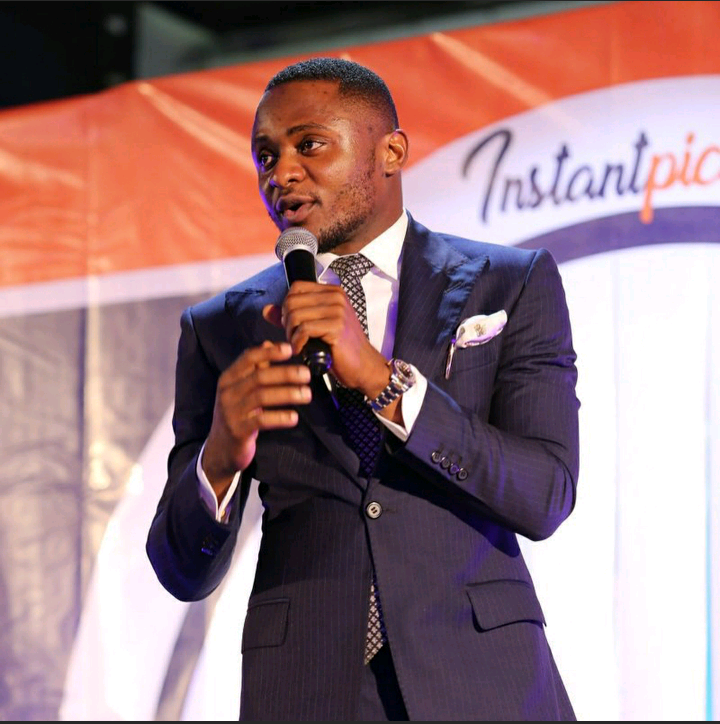
- Ubi Franklin, at the launch of InstantPickup in 2017
- Born: Ubi-Franklin Ekapong Ofem; 2 February 1986 (age 40); Calabar, Cross River State, Nigeria
- Education: Madonna University
- Occupations: Music manager, investor, event planner, promoter
- Website: instantpickupapp.com

Ubi-Franklin Ekapong Ofem, known mononymously as Ubi Franklin, is a Nigerian music artist manager, politician, entrepreneur, TV show host and the founder of record label Made Men Music Group (Triple MG) and Instant Apartment. Franklin was the Special Adviser to Benedict Ayade on Tourism.

== Early and personal life ==
Ubi-Franklin Ekapong Ofem was born in Cross River State, Nigeria on 2 February 1986. He is the 11th of 15 children. He had his primary and secondary education in Calabar, after which he studied law at the University Madonna Nigeria.

On 1 November 2015, Ubi Franklin married Nigerian actress Lilian Esoro. Their son Jayden, was born on 17 July 2016. Presently, he has four children, two daughters (Zaneta and Ariella) and two sons (Jayden and Shiloh). Franklin admitted that from July 2016 to March 2017, he struggled to overcome bouts of depression which almost led him to commit suicide.

He was almost killed by a man at a furniture store in Lagos, but by the quick intervention of his cousin, he was saved. The attacker was eventually arrested.

== Career ==
Franklin worked as an assistant to Julius Agwu before going on to work with AY Makun and other artists. He then worked promoting shows. In 2010, he became Iyanya's manager before the song "kukere" was released, which became a hit. In 2014, when the label had expanded, other artists, including Tekno, Emma Nyra, and Selebobo were signed.

In 2016, Franklin was named City People Music Awards' Music Manager of the Year. In July 2017, he launched Instant Pickup, an online service that offers instant home pickup and delivery of laundry. He also launched Instant Apartment, an online platform that offers luxury apartments for rent same year. In October 2018, he launched Instant Ryde, an online taxi service in his home town Calabar, Cross River state and Uyo, Akwa Ibom state.

In 2020, Ubi Franklin was appointed as Special Adviser on Tourism by Cross River State Governor Benedict Ayade.

Franklin is also a public speaker. He was a speaker at the Youth Enterprise Conference organised by Nairabet's founder, Otunba Akin Alabi. He also shared stage with chairman of First Bank, Ibukun Awosika, and Veteran Nollywood Actor Richard Mofe Damijo at the Hub Business Conference organised by Commonwealth of Zion Assembly.

== Philanthropy ==
In 2017, Ubi Franklin launched the 'Ubi Franklin Startup fund', a platform to fund existing business ideas and plans. Through the fund, he has supported several businesses in Nigeria with startup capital and funds.
