= Sean Tizzle =

Nigerian singer (born 1989)

- Born: Morihanfen Oluwaseun Oluwabamidele; December 15, 1989 (age 36); Ikeja, Lagos State, Nigeria
- Origin: Ilaje, Ondo State, Nigeria
- Genres: Afrobeats, R&B, Reggae, Hiphop, Dancehall, Pop & African Music
- Occupations: Singer, songwriter, performer
- Years active: 2013–present
- Label: Wind Vane Music
- Website: seantizzle.com

Morihanfen Oluwaseun Oluwabamidele (born 15 December 1989), known by his stage name as Sean Tizzle, is a Nigerian singer and songwriter. He is currently signed to Wind Vane Music.

== Early life and career ==
Sean Tizzle was born into a Christian home in 1989, he is the fourth child in a family of five. Although he was born in Ikeja, he grew up in Ikorodu, and attended Community Grammar School, Majidun as well as the Command Secondary School, Ibadan, he then went on to study theatre arts at the University of Ibadan. He began his music career as a rapper with the 3-Way band.

Sean rose to stardom in 2013 after the release of his smash hit single Sho Lee and thereafter worked with Unlimited L.A to deliver the music video.

In 2014, MTN Nigeria announced the signing of the music artiste on a 20 million naira endorsement deal. He also landed a Bacardi Breezer ambassadorship in August of the same year.

== Notable performances ==
He has performed in several popular events, including:

- Etisalat (2014) (Easy Cliq Campus Tour)
- Ay Live (2013)
- Nokia Lumia Party (2013)
- Hennessy Artistry (2013)
- Star Music Trek (2014)
- First Bank
- UBA (All About You Debit MasterCard Launch)
- Sterling Bank (GetReadyFor Work) 2013
- Coko Bar Music Festival (London) 2013
- Nea Awards (New-York)
- African Social Awards Malaysia ASAM (Malaysia) 2013
- Felabration 2013
- GT Bank (End Of The Year Party 2013)
- Access Bank plc (End Of The Year Party 2013)
- Headies Awards 2013
- Lagos Count Down 2013
- Uk tour 2014 (6 cities)
- Uk tour 2015 (7 cities)
- Uk tour 2016 (10 cities)
- Tim Westwood
- Loud Beach Party (2018)
- The Sean Tizzle Experience (2019)

== Discography ==
=== Studio albums ===
- The Journey (2014)
- DUES (Sean TIZZLE Album) 2023

=== EPs ===
- Moving Forward (2017)

Where You Been (2021)

=== Singles ===
- Kilogbe
- Kilogbe Remix ft. Olamide & Reminisce
- Komole(Produced by Aje Filmworks)
- Mama Eh
- Boogie Down
- Sho Lee
- International Badman
- Abeg (2015)
- Kpata Kpata (2016) (As featured artiste)
- Perfect Gentleman
- Loke Loke (featured 9ice)
- Igi Orombo (featured Tiwa Savage)
- Abiamo
- Eruku Sa’ Ye Po
- Jalolo
- Like To Party
- Hit and Run (featuring Tory Lanez)
- Thank You
- Telephone man
- Roll up
- Dide
- Alhaji Abass
- Latin Lover ft. Daxmpire
- Arawa ni
- Wasted (2018)
- Best For you (2018)
- Kpro Kpro (2018)
- Kpro Kpro remix ft Davido (2018)
- Belinda (2018)
- Pempe (2018)
- Lotto (2019)
- Contagious (2019)
- Abena (2020)
- Oreke (2020)
- Sure for you (2020)
- Time & Season (2024)

=== Film and television ===
Film
Year	Title	Role	Notes	Ref
2014	Dazzling Mirage		Supporting role	
2015	Astray		Supporting role	

== Awards and nominations ==
Year	Awards ceremony	Award description(s)	Results
2013	The Headies	Next Rated	Won
2013	The Headies	Producer of the Year (D'Tunes)	Won
2013	African Social Awards	International Act Of The Year	Won
2014	Caribbean African American Nations Award	Best New Musician Of The Year	Won
2014	Nigeria Media Award	Next Rated Artiste	Won
2014	Nigerian Music Video Award	Best New Music Video (Sho Lee)	Won

== See also ==
- List of Nigerian musicians

Awards and achievements
Preceded by Davido (2012)	Next Rated Award; 2013	Succeeded by Patoranking (2014)
