= Flavour discography =

Discography of Flavour

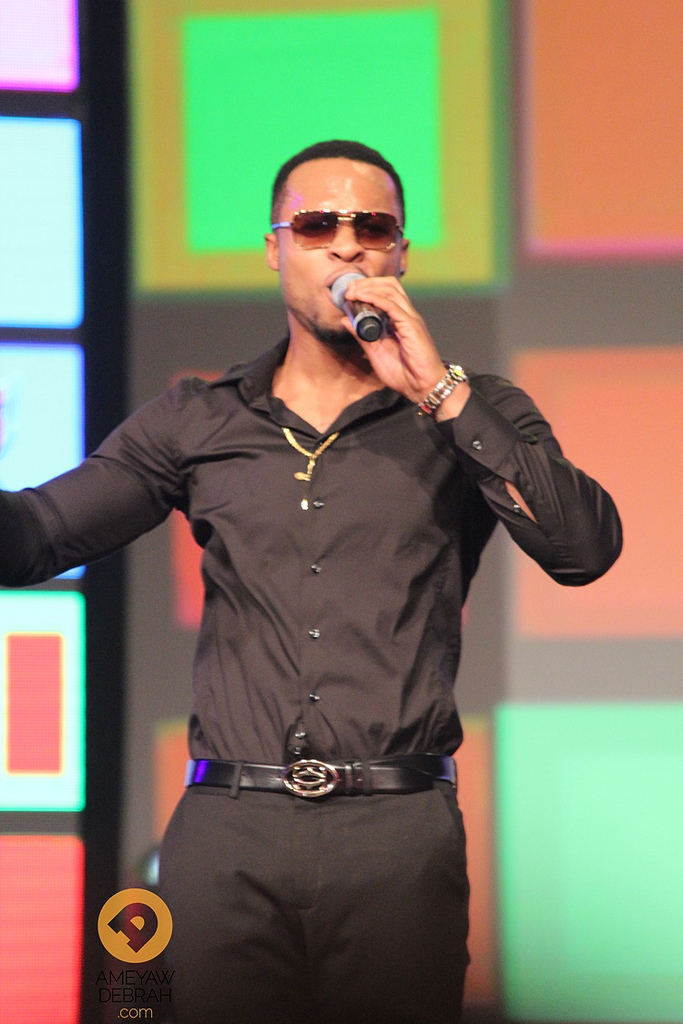
- Studio albums: 5
- Singles: 187
- Music videos: 60
- Collaborative albums: 1
- Promotional singles: 5

The discography of Flavour consists of seven studio albums, three extended plays, one compilation album, one live album, one-hundred and fifty-six singles (including ninety-one as featured artist), two promotional singles, and seventy-three music videos. Flavour began his career in Enugu as a drummer and pianist before releasing his debut album N'abania in 2008, which was popular in Eastern Nigeria. He broke into national recognition with his second album Uplifted (2010), containing hit singles like "Nwa Baby (Ashawo Remix)" and "Adamma". His third album Blessed (2012) marked a major step in his career, followed by his fourth Thankful (2014), which featured the hit singles "Ololufe" with Chidinma and "Wake Up" with Wande Coal. In 2017, he released his fifth studio album Ijele the Traveler, a 17-track project that included a collaboration with his adopted son, Semah G. Weifur. He later worked with Yemi Alade and Umu Obiligbo on singles in 2018. Flavour's sixth studio album, Flavour of Africa, was released on 4 December 2020. On 30 November 2023, Flavour released his seventh studio album African Royalty, which was supported by the singles "Game Changer (Dike)", "Big Baller", and "Her Excellency (Nwunye Odogwu)", with a cameo from Nigerian actress Regina Daniels.

== Studio albums ==
Title	Album details
N'abania	Released: 2008; Label: Obaino Music; Format: CD, digital download
Uplifted	Released: 4 April 2010; Label: Obaino Music, 2nite Entertainment; Format: CD, digital download
Blessed	Released: 18 October 2012; Label: 2nite Entertainment; Format: CD, digital download
Thankful	Released: 14 November 2014; Label: 2nite Entertainment; Format: CD, digital download
Ijele the Traveler	Released: 30 June 2017; Label: 2nite Entertainment; Format: CD, streaming, digital download
Flavour of Africa	Released: 4 December 2020; Label: 2nite Music Group; Format: Streaming, digital download
African Royalty	Released: 1 December 2023; Label: 2nite Music Group; Format: Streaming, digital download

== Extended plays ==
Title	Album details
Divine (with Semah)	Released: 12 March 2018; Label: 2Nite Music Group; Format: Digital download
Awele (with Umu Obiligbo)	Released: 12 December 2018; Label: 2Nite Music Group; Format: Streaming, digital download
40Yrs Everlasting (with Chidinma)	Released: 18 November 2019; Label: 2Nite Music Group; Format: Streaming, digital download

== Compilation albums ==
Title	Album details
Game Changer, Vol. 1	Released: 5 May 2023; Label: 2Nite Music Group; Format: Streaming, digital download

== Live albums ==
Title	Album details
Flavour Experience (Love Songs) Vol.1 (Acoustic)	Released: 19 July 2024; Label: 2Nite Music Group; Format: Streaming, digital download

== Singles ==
=== As lead artist ===
List of singles as lead artist, with year released and album name
Title	Year	Album
"N'abania" (featuring Mr Raw)	2009	N'abania
"Nwa Baby"	2009	N'abania
"Nwata"	2009	N'abania
"Rigirigi"	2009	N'abania
"Ashawo (Ghana Remix)" (featuring Asem and Bradez)	2010	Uplifted
"Oyi (I Dey Catch Cold)"	2010	Uplifted
"Adamma"	2010	Uplifted
"Thank God" (featuring Sho' Boi)	2011	Non-album single
"Nwa Baby (Ashawo Remix)"	2011	Uplifted
"Odiro Easy"	2011	Uplifted
"Iwe (Tribute to MC Loph)"	2011	Non-album singles
"Nigeria Ebezina (Subsidy)"	2012	Non-album singles
"Oyi (Remix)" (featuring Tiwa Savage)	2012	Non-album singles
"Kwarikwa" (Remix) (featuring Fally Ipupa)	2012	Blessed
"Baby Oku"	2012	Blessed
"Shake"	2012	Blessed
"Chinny Baby"	2013	Blessed
"Ada Ada"	2013	Blessed
"I'm For Real"	2014	Non-album single
"Wake Up" (featuring Wande Coal)	2014	Thankful
"Golibe"	2014	Thankful
"Ololufe" (featuring Chidinma)	2015	Thankful
"Power to Win"	2015	Non-album singles
"Sexy Rosey" (featuring P-Square)	2015	Non-album singles
"Wiser" (featuring M.I and Phyno)	2015	Thankful
"Champion"	2016	Non-album singles
"Mama" (featuring Chidinma)	2016	Non-album singles
"Dance"	2016	Thankful
"Mmege Mmege" (featuring Selebobo)	2016	Thankful
"Professor JohnBull"	2016	Non-album singles
"Gbo Gan Gbom (Une Soul)" (featuring Phyno and Zoro)	2016	Non-album singles
"Obianuju"	2016	Non-album singles
"Baby Na Yoka"	2017	Ijele the Traveler
"Virtuous Woman"	2017	Ijele the Traveler
"Catch You"	2017	Ijele the Traveler
"Sake of Love" (featuring Sarkodie)	2017	Ijele the Traveler
"Most High" (featuring Semah G. Weifur)	2017	Ijele the Traveler
"Jaiye"	2017	Ijele the Traveler
"Loose Guard" (featuring Phyno)	2017	Ijele the Traveler
"Nnekata"	2017	Ijele the Traveler
"Chimamanda"	2017	Ijele the Traveler
"Ijele" (featuring Zoro)	2017	Ijele the Traveler
"Someone Like You"	2018	Non-album single
"All We Need" (with Semah)	2018	Divine
"No One Like You" (with Semah)	2018	Divine
"Time to Party" (featuring Diamond Platnumz)	2018	Non-album single
"Crazy Love" (featuring Yemi Alade)	2018	Non-album single
"Awele" (featuring Umu Obiligbo)	2018	Awele
"Ariva"	2019	Non-album singles
"Mercy" (featuring Semah)	2019	Non-album singles
"40 Yrs" (with Chidinma)	2019	40 Yrs Everlasting
"Kanayo" (featuring PC Lapez)	2020	Non-album single
"Chop Life" (featuring Phyno)	2020	Non-album single
"Looking Nyash"	2020	Flavour of Africa
"Doings" (featuring Phyno)	2020	Flavour of Africa
"Umuigbo" (featuring Biggie Igba)	2021	Flavour of Africa
"Omo T'emi"	2021	Flavour of Africa
"Good Woman"	2021	Flavour of Africa
"Berna Reloaded" (featuring Fally Ipupa and Diamond Platnumz)	2021	Non-album singles
"Levels"	2021	Non-album singles
"My Sweetie"	2022	Non-album singles
"Game Changer (Dike)"	2022	African Royalty
"Big Baller"	2023	African Royalty
"Her Excellency (Nwunye Odogwu)"	2024	African Royalty
"Afroculture" (featuring Baaba Maal)	2025	Afroculture
"Uzo Ano" (with Phyno)	2026	Non-album single
"Perfection" (with Tobe Nwigwe featuring C. S. Armstrong)	2026	The Bridge

=== As featured artist ===
List of singles as featured artist
Title	Year	Album
"Osondi Owendi" (MC Loph featuring Flavour)	2009	Hands Up
"Ife Osolugi Mebe" (Tony Oneweek featuring Flavour and Matronomy)	2009	De Champion
"Mama" (MC Loph featuring Flavour)	2010	Hands Up
"Money Identity" (Big Lo featuring Flavour)	2010	Non-album single
"Adamma" (Mr Raw featuring Flavour)	2010	End of Discussion
"My Baby" (VIP featuring Flavour)	2010	Progress
"Multiply (Remix)" (Phyno featuring Timaya, Flavour, Mr Raw, and M.I)	2010	No Guts No Glory
"Enugu" (Stormrex featuring Flavour)	2011	The New Storm
"Orobo (Remix)" (Sound Sultan featuring Flavour)	2011	Me, My Mouth & Eye
"Sisi Eko (Remix)" (Darey featuring Flavour)	2011	Non-album single
"Odeshi" (Selebobo featuring Flavour)	2011	Non-album single
"Body Body" (JayStuntz featuring Flavour and Waga G)	2012	Non-album single
"Oyinbo" (Malcoholic featuring Flavour)	2012	Non-album single
"Bottom Belle" (Omawumi featuring Flavour)	2012	Lasso of Truth
"Odeshi" (Jerry Cee featuring Flavour)	2012	Non-album single
"Give it to Me" (Kcee featuring Flavour)	2012	Take Over
"Ulena" (Adaz featuring Flavour)	2012	Non-album single
"Paulina" (Fanzy featuring Flavour)	2013	Non-album single
"Oluchi" (Solidstar featuring Flavour)	2013	Grace & Glory
"Jombolo" (Iyanya featuring Flavour)	2013	Desire
"Isi Aja (Remix)" (Waga G featuring Flavour)	2013	Non-album single
"Hero (Remix)" (Sho'Boi featuring Flavour)	2014	Non-album single
"Marry Me" (B'Rhymszs featuring Flavour)	2014	Non-album single
"Oh Baby (You & I Remix)" (Chidinma featuring Flavour)	2014	Non-album single
"Tonight" (Bracket featuring Flavour)	2014	Non-album single
"Sampuwa" (Sheyman featuring Flavour)	2014	Non-album single
"Fall In Love" (Jiron featuring Flavour)	2014	Non-album single
"Ike" (T.M featuring Flavour)	2014	Non-album single
"Helele" (Naeto C featuring Flavour)	2014	Festival
"Gbawaya (Remix)" (TSpize featuring Phyno and Flavour)	2014	Non-album single
"Nana" (Diamond Platnumz featuring Flavour)	2015	A Boy from Tandale
"Finally" (Masterkraft featuring Flavour and Sarkdoie)	2015	Unlimited: The Tape
"Nwata Di Nma" (Mr. Moi featuring Flavour)	2015	Non-album singles
"Duro (Remix)" (Tekno featuring Flavour and Phyno)	2015	Non-album singles
"Nku" (Illbliss featuring Flavour and Stormrex)	2016	Illygaty:7057
"Ogene" (Zoro featuring Flavour)	2016	Non-album single
"TGIF (Time No Dey)" (DJ Neptune featuring Flavour)	2016	Non-album single
"Turn Up" (DJ Jimmy Jatt featuring Flavour)	2016	Non-album single
"Give it to Me" (Akothee featuring Flavour)	2016	Non-album single
"Jukwese" (DJ Neptune featuring Flavour)	2016	Osinachi
"M.O.N.E.Y" (Timaya featuring Flavour)	2016	Non-album single
"Kom Kom" (Yemi Alade featuring Flavour)	2016	Mama Africa
"Ogene (Remix)" (Zoro featuring Flavour, Lil Kesh, and Ycee)	2016	Non-album single
"African Lady" (Sound Sultan featuring Phyno and Flavour)	2016	Out of the Box
"Blessing" (Mr Raw featuring Flavour)	2016	Non-album singles
"My Woman" (King featuring Flavour)	2016	Non-album singles
"Roll Up" (DJ Derekz featuring Flavour)	2016	Non-album singles
"Far Away" (Masterkraft featuring Tekno and Flavour)	2016	Unlimited: The Tape
"Ladder (Remix)" (Mr 2Kay featuring Flavour)	2017	Non-album singles
"Chop Kiss" (Bracket featuring Flavour)	2017	Non-album singles
"As E Dey Hot" (DJ Xclusive featuring Flavour and Mr Eazi)	2017	Non-album singles
"Atulaylay" (Queen Juli Endee featuring Flavour)	2017	Non-album singles
"Medicine Remix" (Wizkid featuring Flavour and Phyno)	2017	Non-album singles
"Echolac (Bag of Blessings)" (Zoro featuring Flavour)	2017	Non-album singles
"Ur Waist" (Sarkodie featuring Flavour)	2017	Higher
"Obioma (Remix)" (J. Martins featuring Flavour)	2017	Non-album singles
"She Bad (Remix)" (Turner featuring Machel Montano and Flavour)	2017	Non-album singles
"Very Connected" (Fiokee featuring Flavour)	2018	Non-album singles
"Sauté Sauté" (Pierrette Adams featuring Flavour)	2018	Non-album singles
"Jamais Jamais (Remix)" (Mr. Leo featuring Flavour)	2018	Non-album singles
"Alele" (Seyi Shay featuring Flavour and DJ Consequence)	2018	Electric Package EP, Vol. 1
"Low Waist" (Masterkraft featuring Flavour and Duncan Mighty)	2018	Non-album single
"Like This" (Ajaeze featuring Flavour and Masterkraft)	2018	Non-album single
"Ani" (DeeJay J Masta featuring Phyno and Flavour)	2018	Non-album single
"By My Side" (DJ Derekz featuring Flavour and Phyno)	2018	Non-album single
"Yoyo" (Adekunle Gold featuring Flavour)	2018	About 30
"Culture" (Umu Obiligbo featuring Phyno and Flavour)	2019	Non-album single
"Consider" (Del B featuring Flavour and Wizkid)	2019	Afrodisiac: The Mixtape
"Turn Me On" (Wrecobah featuring Flavour)	2019	Non-album single
"Sweet" (Ketchup featuring Flavour)	2019	Skillahmatic
"Ikuwago" (Jay Fashion featuring Flavour)	2019	Non-album singles
"Angela" (Young D featuring Flavour, Yemi Alade, Harmonize, Gyptian, and Singuila)	2019	Non-album singles
"Akwaba" (CDQ featuring Flavour)	2019	Non-album singles
"Tene" (Larry Gaaga featuring Flavour)	2019	Non-album singles
"Forever" (Assorted featuring Flavour)		Non-album singles
"Kpuchie" (Sam Dutchy featuring Flavour and Waga G)	2020	Non-album singles
"Cha Cha" (Charass featuring Flavour)	2020	Non-album singles
"Equipment" (Masterkraft featuring Flavour)	2020	Non-album singles
"Consider II" (Del B featuring Wizkid, Flavour, Walshy Fire, and Kes)	2020	Non-album singles
"Papa Benji" (Basketmouth featuring Flavour and Phyno)	2020	Non-album singles
"Egedege" (Masterkraft featuring Flavour, Phyno, and Theresa Onuorah)	2021	Non-album singles
"Cash Out" (Senior Mantain featuring Flavour)	2022	Non-album singles
"Hard to Find" (Chike featuring Flavour)	2022	The Brother's Keeper
"Bambam" (PMP featuring Flavour, Beenie Man, and Reekado Banks)	2022	Non-album single
"Ovami" (Oxlade featuring Flavour)	2023	OFA (Oxlade From Africa)
"Your Majesty" (Dante Bowe featuring Flavour)	2023	Dante Bowe
"Ndi Ike" (Falz featuring Flavour and Odumodublvck)	2023	Before the Feast
"Amala Ubor" (Doublegrace featuring Flavour)	2023	Non-album singles
"Powers" (Odumeje featuring Flavour)	2024	Non-album singles
"Egwu Ukwu (Waist Dance)" (Dr Adaku featuring Flavour)	2024	Non-album singles
"Obodo" (Larry Gaaga featuring Phyno, Flavour, and Theresa Onuorah)	2024	Non-album singles
"Odeshi" (Timaya featuring Flavour and Yung Alpha)	2025	Non-album singles

== Promotional singles ==
List of promotional singles
Title	Year	Album
"Fly With the Eagles" (with Waje, Bez, and Illbliss)	2013	Non-album singles
"Power to Win" (featuring M.I, Irene Logan, and Kwabena Kwabena)	2014	Non-album singles

== Guest appearances ==
List of non-single guest appearances, with other performing artists, showing year released and album name
Title	Year	Other artist(s)	Album
"Hustlers"	2005	Mr Raw	Right and Wrung
"Kpakorokpa"	2007	Mr Raw	Everything Remains Raw
"Strong and Mighty"	2007	Mr Raw, Dekumzy	Everything Remains Raw
"Adamma"	2010	Mr Raw, Harry B	End of Discussion
"Ebemsi"	2010	Ruggedman	Untouchable
"Number 1"	2010	M.I	MI 2: The Movie
"Beautiful Baby"	2011	Bracket	Cupid Stories
"One by One (Ofu Ofu)"	2013	Ruffcoin	Diamond in the Ruff
"Baby Mo"	2013	Tiwa Savage	Once Upon a Time
"Authe (Authentic)"	2014	Phyno	No Guts No Glory
"Egbe Belu"	2015	Bracket	Alive
"Big Something"	2015	Orezi, M.I	The Gehn Gehn Album
"Before"	2015	Burna Boy	On a Spaceship
"Legit"	2016	Solidstar, Phyno	W.E.E.D.
"Okpeke"	2016	Phyno, 2Baba	The Playmaker
"Love You Still"	2016	Shaydee	Rhythm & Life
"Oh My God"	2017	Kcee	Attention to Detail
"Yoyo"	2018	Adekunle Gold	About 30
"Vibe"	2019	Phyno	Deal with It
"Mon Bébé"	2020	Patoranking	Three
"Abeykehh"	2021	Masterkraft, Selebobo	Masta Groove
"Feel Am"	2021	Mayorkun	Back in Office
"Fada"	2021	Zlatan, Phyno	Resan
"Ike Pentecost"	2021	Phyno	Something to Live For
"Assembly of Gods"	2022	Basketmouth, The Cavemen., Falz, Magnito, Illbliss, Dremo	Horoscopes
"Men Don Show Face"	2024	Phyno	Full Time Job

== Cameo appearances ==
Year	Title	Artist	Director
2017	"Yawa"	Tekno	Patrick Elis

== Music videos ==
=== As lead artist ===
List of music videos as lead artist, showing date released and directors
Title	Year	Director(s)
"N'abania" (featuring Mr Raw)	2009	Uzodinma Okpechi
"Nwata"	2009	Bobby Hai
"I Don Smoke Igbo" (featuring D Mustard, Prophecy, Waga G, MJay, and Hype MC)	2009	Cobi
"Nwa Baby"	2009	Bobby Hai
"Rigirigi"	2009	Bobby Hai
"Oyi (I Dey Catch Cold)"	2010	Bobby Hai
"Adamma" (first version)	2010	Bobby Hai
"My Woman Is Gone" (featuring Jah Dey)	2011	Janelle Abraham
"Ashawo (Ghana Remix)" (featuring Asem and Flowking Stone)	2011	Bobby Hai
"Nwa Baby (Ashawo Remix)"	2011	Godfather Productions
"Odiro Easy"	2011	The Oracle
"Adamma" (second version)	2011	Godfather Productions
"Iwe (Tribute to MC Loph)"	2011	The Oracle
"Nigeria Ebezina (Subsidy)"	2012	The Oracle
"Oyi (Remix)" (featuring Tiwa Savage)	2012	Godfather Productions
"Kwarikwa (Remix)" (featuring Fally Ipupa)	2012	Godfather Productions
"Baby Oku"	2012	Antwan Smith
"Shake"	2012	Godfather Productions
"Chinny Baby"	2013	Trademark Pictures
"Ada Ada"	2013	Clarence Peters
"Ikwokrikwo"	2014	Clarence Peters
"Black is Beautiful"	2014	Trademark Pictures
"I'm for Real"	2014	Godfather Productions
"Wake Up" (featuring Wande Coal)	2014	Clarence Peters
"Golibe"	2014	Clarence Peters
"Ololufe" (featuring Chidinma)	2015	Godfather Productions
"Power to Win"	2015	Peppermint Films Inc.
"Sexy Rosey" (featuring P-Square)	2015	Godfather Productions
"Wiser" (featuring M.I and Phyno)	2015	Clarence Peters
"Champion"	2016	Godfather Productions
"Mama" (featuring Chidinma)	2016	Clarence Peters
"Dance"	2016	Clarence Peters
"Mmege Mmege" (featuring Selebobo)	2016	Clarence Peters
"Obianuju"	2016	Patrick Elis
"Gbo Gan Gbom" (featuring Phyno and Zoro)	2016	Clarence Peters
"Baby Na Yoka"	2017	Patrick Elis
"Virtuous Woman"	2017	Sesan
"Catch You"	2017	Sesan
"Sake of Love" (featuring Sarkodie)	2017	Sesan
"Most High" (featuring Semah)	2017	Adasa Cookey
"Jaiye"	2017	Sesan
"Loose Guard" (featuring Phyno)	2017	Patrick Elis
"Nnekata"	2017	Tchidi Chikere
"Chimamanda"	2017	Godfather Productions
"Ijele" (featuring Zoro)	2017	Tchidi Chikere
"Someone Like You"	2018	Patrick Elis
"All We Need" (featuring Semah)	2018	Clarence Peters
"No One Like You" (featuring Semah)	2018	Clarence Peters
"Power and Glory" (featuring Semah)	2018	AngryBird Productions
"Unchangeable" (featuring Semah)	2018	Clarence Peters
"Time to Party" (featuring Diamond Platnumz)	2018	Patrick Elis
"Crazy Love" (featuring Yemi Alade)	2018	Patrick Elis
"Awele" (featuring Umu Obiligbo)	2018	Adasa Cookey
"Ariva"	2019	Meji Alabi
"Mercy" (featuring Semah)	2019	Visuall Code
"40 Yrs" (with Chidinma)	2019	TG Omori
"Nkem" (with Chidinma)	2019	Clarence Peters
"Mma Mma" (with Chidinma)	2019	Clarence Peters
"Iyawo Mi" (with Chidinma)	2019	AngryBird Productions
"Kanayo" (featuring PC Lapez)	2020	AngryBird Productions
"Chop Life" (featuring Phyno)	2020	TG Omori
"Looking Nyash"	2020	TG Omori
"Doings" (featuring Phyno)	2020	TG Omori
"Umuigbo" (featuring Biggie Igba)	2021	AngryBird Productions
"Omo T'emi"	2021	AngryBird Productions
"Good Woman"	2021	Dammy Twitch
"Berna Reloaded" (featuring Fally Ipupa and Diamond Platnumz)	2021	Dammy Twitch
"Levels"	2021	Patrick Elis
"Beer Parlor Discussions" (featuring Waga G)	2022	Loud Films
"My Sweetie"	2022	Patrick Elis
"Game Changer (Dike)"	2022	Dammy Twitch
"Big Baller"	2024	Dammy Twitch
"Her Excellency (Nwunye Odogwu)"	2024	Director Pink
"Afroculture" (featuring Baaba Maal)	2025	TG Omori
"The Eagle Has Landed"	2025	TG Omori
"War Ready" (featuring Odumeje)	2026	—N/a
"Bam Bam" (featuring Pheelz)	2026	—N/a
