= List of Igbo music artists =

This is a list of Igbo music artists, including singers, composers, instrumentalists, and producers of Igbo descent. These individuals have significantly contributed to Nigerian and global music, particularly in genres such as highlife, Afrobeats, Afropop, hip-hop, gospel music, and traditional African music.

== Pioneers and highlife legends ==
- Chief Stephen Osita Osadebe – icon of Igbo highlife music.
- Dr. Sir Warrior – leader of the Oriental Brothers International Band.
- Oliver De Coque – renowned for blending Igbo traditional music with modern guitar.
- Celestine Ukwu – known for deep philosophical lyricism.
- Mike Ejeagha – master of storytelling through music and folklore.
- Prince Nico Mbarga – known for pan-African hit Sweet Mother.
- Rex Lawson – a Kalabari-Igbo highlife legend.

== Early 2000s Indigenous hip-hop and urban acts ==
These artists were instrumental in popularizing Igbo rap, highlife fusion, street-hop, and comedy-music performance in the early digital era.

- Nigga Raw – often credited as the father of Igbo rap. He popularized indigenous language in commercial rap starting in the mid-2000s.
- 2Shotz – versatile rapper known for bilingual rap delivery, social themes, and humor-infused storytelling.
- Ruggedman – although of mixed heritage, Ruggedman played a vital role in promoting indigenous rap, collaborating with Igbo rappers like 2Shotz and Mr Raw.
- Klint da Drunk – stand-up comic turned musician, known for his comedy-infused Igbo musical performances.
- Big Lo – late rapper and producer, known for his hit collaboration with Nigga Raw, Delicious.
- MC Loph – remembered for modernizing Chief Osadebe’s classic “Osondi Owendi” in a popular tribute. Passed away in 2011.
- Slowdog – known for humorous and vibrant street Igbo rap from Enugu.
- Dekumzy – producer behind many Igbo gospel, pop, and hip-hop*
- Kcee (Kingsley Chinweike Okonkwo) – singer and performer who began his career in the early 2000s as part of the duo KC Presh. Later became a solo Afropop star with hits like Limpopo and Pull Over. Of Igbo origin from Anambra State.

== Contemporary Afropop, Afrobeat and hip-hop ==
- Phyno – Indigenous rapper celebrated for his use of Igbo language in rap.
- Flavour N'abania – highlife-pop fusion artist and cultural ambassador.
- Zoro – Indigenous Igbo rapper with street appeal.
- Illbliss – veteran rapper and label executive.
- Runtown – Afropop artist with international success.
- Mr Eazi – music entrepreneur and singer.
- Tekno – hitmaker with Igbo roots.
- Patoranking – reggae-dancehall star of Igbo descent.
- Jeriq – street-influenced rapper from Enugu.
- Bosalin – known for fusing Igbo culture with conscious rap.
- Ifex G – Popular for hits like Anumanu, blending street rap and Igbo slang.
- Ugoccie – viral female rapper and singer with feminist and Igbo lyrical influence.
- Anyidons – prominent for reviving modern Igbo highlife fusion.
- Kolaboy – Indigenous rapper known for lyrical depth and street relevance.
- Tidinz – deceased artist revered for aggressive street Igbo rap.
- Sparkle Tee – rapper blending hustle culture and gospel themes.
- Nuno Zigi – rapper known for sharp punchlines and urban Igbo flavor.
- Slam Dee – emerging voice in the local Igbo hip-hop wave.
- Blaqbonez (Emeka Akumefule) – popular rapper known for comedic delivery and genre fusion.
- Chike (Chike-Ezekpeazu Osebuka) – soul-pop singer with Igbo-influenced love ballads.
- Jaywillz – Afro-pop vocalist from Enugu State, known for Medicine.
- Rexxie (Ezeh Chisom Faith) – Afropiano producer behind chart-topping hits.
- WurlD – Nigerian-American artist with maternal Igbo heritage, known for experimental Afrobeats.
- Naeto C (Naetochukwu Chikwe) – U.S.-educated Igbo rapper and early pioneer of modern Naija rap.
- Ric Hassani – R&B artist with deep roots in Igbo storytelling traditions.
- Soma Apex – pop-soul artist and actor from Port Harcourt with Igbo lineage.

== Gospel music artists ==
- Chinyere Udoma - pioneer of Igbo gospel songs. Known for originality, gospel storytelling, and evergreen songs.
- Sinach – globally acclaimed gospel songwriter and worship leader.
- Chioma Jesus – pioneer of Igbo gospel worship.
- Mercy Chinwo – award-winning gospel singer.
- Judikay – urban gospel minister.
- Frank Edwards – producer and singer.
- Gozie Okeke & Njideka Okeke – known for Akanchawa and gospel storytelling.
- Mr M & Revelation

== Traditional and cultural musicians ==
- Pericoma Okoye – mystic performer from Arondizuogu.
- Umu Obiligbo – brothers modernizing palm wine highlife.
- Chief Emeka Morocco Maduka – “Eze Egwu Ekpili”, respected traditional performer.
- Ogene Cultural Group – renowned for authentic Igbo percussion music.

== Producers and composers ==
- Masterkraft – Afrobeats producer of Igbo origin.
- Young Jonn – pop producer and performer with Igbo heritage.
- Del B – Afropop hitmaker.
- Kezyklef – eastern Nigeria-based hip-hop producer.

== Igbo women in music ==
- Nelly Uchendu – icon of traditional Igbo ballads.
- Onyeka Onwenu – pop icon and human rights activist.
- Ada Ehi – gospel music minister.
- Waje – powerful soul and gospel vocalist.
- Yemi Alade – pan-African pop star with Igbo maternal roots.

== Diaspora and international influence ==
- Obi Asika – music executive and cultural entrepreneur.
- Jidenna – Nigerian-American artist with Igbo roots.
- Chinonso Arubayi – gospel singer blending Igbo with contemporary worship.

== See also ==
- Music of Nigeria
- Igbo language
- List of Nigerian musicians
