= Ijele the Traveler =

Studio album by Flavour
- Released: 27 June 2017
- Genres: Afropop; Igbo highlife; reggae; trap; gospel
- Length: 63:51
- Languages: Igbo; English; Pidgin
- Label: 2nite Entertainment
- Producers: Flavour; Masterkraft; Del B; Jaystuntz; Selebobo; Cobhams Asuquo; Tekno; Young John; Illkeyz; Kezyklef

Flavour chronology
Thankful (2014)	Ijele the Traveler (2017)	Flavour of Africa (2020)

Ijele the Traveler is the fifth studio album by Nigerian musician Flavour. The album was released on 27 June 2017 by 2nite Entertainment, and features guest appearances from Sarkodie, Zoro, Terry Apala, Phyno, Chidinma, and Semah G. Weifur. The production was handled by Masterkraft, Tekno, Young John, Del B, Jaystuntz, Cobhams Asuquo, Illkeyz, Kezyklef, and Flavour himself. Ijele the Traveler follows Flavour's fourth studio album Thankful (2014).

== Composition ==
Ijele the Traveler incorporates elements of Igbo highlife while drawing on Afropop, reggae, trap, and gospel influences. Igbo masquerade culture, with its Ijele Masquerade, significantly influences the album. The opening track, “Virtuous Woman”, is a guitar ballad in which Flavour describes his ideal partner through both English and Igbo lyrics. The track has been said to be reminiscent of past songs "Ada Ada" and "Golibe". "Baby Na Yoka" combines reggaeton with highlife, while “Sake of Love” features Ghanaian rapper Sarkodie over a mid-tempo Afropop beat built on drums and guitar riffs.

The Tekno-produced "Catch You" is a mid-tempo song with piano, guitar, and drum patterns that includes a reference to Fela Kuti's "Lady". The Phyno-produced "Loose Guard" contains playful food metaphors over a flute-led beat by Young John. The title track, "Ijele", with Zoro, incorporates folk elements such as ọjà playing and popular Igbo chants. Other tracks explore different sounds: "Body Calling" uses a trap-influenced EDM production and features Terry Apala, "Ukwu Nwata" retains highlife guitar riffs and Afro drum samples, and "Chimamanda" adapts gospel choruses into a praise song. The closing track, "Most High", features Semah G. Weifur, Flavour's adoptive son, on a soft-rock inspired duet recorded after the two met in Monrovia.

== Critical reception ==
Professional ratings
Review scores
Source	Rating
Pulse Nigeria	3.5/5 stars
tooXclusive	3.5/5 stars
Filter Free	72%

In a review for 360nobs, Wilfred Okiche found the album as a record where Flavour leaned on highlife roots and recycled ideas, but too often diluted his sound to please everyone. He concluded, "On Ijele the Traveler, Flavour is on a journey all right, but it is one that does not lead anywhere just yet." On the contrary, Jim Donnett of tooXclusive praised Ijele the Traveler for Flavour's consistency, dance-driven highlife sound, and strong collaborations, while noting some weaker tracks and thematic disconnects. He concluded, “Basically, hearing Flavour on this new album as he weighs in elements from the basics that formed his musical purpose, is such a basking joy" and gave it a 3.5/5.

Oris Aigbokhaevbolo, writing for Music in Africa, said the album mixed "flesh and faith" while drawing on nostalgia for "ancient Igbo highlife," but criticized it as "a kind of greatest hits collection" where Flavour had "slipped to formula." He concluded it was "an unoriginal trip" that was "not boring," though it "teeters close to failure of the imagination." Pulse Nigeria's Joey Akan saw Ijele the Traveler as a record where Flavour stuck to his familiar highlife formula, blending folk, romance, and mainstream influences with only slight progression. He concluded, "This latest effort might represent a small progression, but it’s far from an evolution", and rated it a 3.5/5. Chiagoziem Onyekwena of Filter Free described Ijele the Traveler as "very contemporary and progressive" while noting it retained Flavour's highlife essence and "rich texture." He remarked that the album showed the artist's "steady growth" and called it "a joy to listen to" overall. He gave the album a rating of 72%.

=== Accolades ===
Awards and nominations for Ijele the Traveler
Organization	Year	Category	Result	Ref.
The Headies	2018	Best R&B/Pop Album	Nominated	
The Headies	2018	Album of the Year	Nominated	

== Track listing ==
Ijele the Traveler track listing
No.	Title	Writer(s)	Producer(s)	Length
1.	"Virtuous Woman"	Chinedu Okoli	Cobhams Asuquo	4:36
2.	"Sake of Love" (featuring Sarkodie)	Okoli; Michael Addo	Masterkraft	3:57
3.	"Catch You"	Okoli	Tekno	3:36
4.	"Baby Na Yoka"	Okoli	Masterkraft	3:35
5.	"Jaiye"	Okoli	Del B	3:30
6.	"Skit" (featuring Oloye, Rabbai, Waga G, and Zuada)	Okoli	—	1:06
7.	"Simba"	Okoli	Del B	3:53
8.	"Nnekata"	Okoli	Masterkraft	3:44
9.	"Chimamanda"	Okoli	Masterkraft	4:23
10.	"Iheneme" (featuring Chidinma)	Okoli	Illkeyz	3:52
11.	"Body Calling" (featuring Terry Apala)	Okoli; Terry Ejeh	Flavour	3:57
12.	"Oringo"	Okoli	Selebobo	4:27
13.	"Oppressor"	Okoli	Masterkraft	3:48
14.	"Ijele" (featuring Zoro)	Okoli; Owoh Chrismathner	Kezyklef	3:46
15.	"Loose Guard" (featuring Phyno)	Okoli; Chibuzor Azubuike	Young John	3:42
16.	"Ukwu Nwata"	Okoli	Jaystuntz	3:59
17.	"Most High" (featuring Semah G. Weifur)	Okoli; Semah G. Weifur	Masterkraft	4:24
Total length:				63:51

Notes

- "—" denotes a skit

== Release history ==
Release history and formats for Ijele the Traveler
Region	Date	Format	Label
Various	27 June 2017	CD; streaming; digital download	2nite Entertainment
