= W.E.E.D. =

Studio album by Solidstar
- Released: 31 October 2016
- Genre: Dancehall; highlife
- Length: 68:00
- Label: Achievas
- Producer: Pbanks; Del B; Kukbeatz; Orbeat

Solidstar chronology
Grace & Glory (2013)	W.E.E.D. (2016)	My Turn (2020)

Singles from W.E.E.D
- 1. "Wait" Released: 20 January 2016; 2. "Wait Refix" Released: 29 May 2016

W.E.E.D (a backronym for Witness Everything Exceptionally Different) is the third studio album by Nigerian singer Solidstar. Released on 31 October 2016, its production was mainly handled by Pbanks, alongside other production from Del B, Kukbeatz, and Orbeat. The album features guest appearances from Attitude, Falz, Flavour, Tiwa Savage, Patoranking, Burna Boy, Timaya, Jojo, Duncan Mighty, Harrysong, Davido, Small Doctor, Phyno, Diamond Platnumz, Reminisce, Mr Eazi, 2Baba, Zoro, and Oritse Femi. It serves as a follow-up to Grace & Glory (2013).

== Background ==
In an interview with HipTV, he revealed the album's title, excluding its full name, which spawned controversy. He stated, "I am not looking at it from the aspect people think. I am just capitalising on the power of that crop— weed. This is one of the strongest crops, even when you don’t want it to grow, it does. That’s the idea behind it. It defines my personality; I am not competing with anybody, I'm just on my own".

Solidstar revealed the details of the album in August 2016, revealing its full title and suggesting that its release would be September. The track list and artwork for W.E.E.D. was revealed on 13 August 2016 via Solidstar's Twitter.

== Singles ==
The album's lead single "Wait" was officially released for digital download on 22 January 2016. It features Davido and was produced by Pbanks. The song's official remix was released on 29 May 2016, as the album's second single. Titled "Wait Refix", it features Patoranking and Tiwa Savage and was nominated for Best Collabo at the 11th Headies Awards.

== Critical reception ==
Joey Akan of Pulse Nigeria highlighted that W.E.E.D. sticks to his comfort zones of dancehall and highlife, resulting in a one-dimensional and sometimes monotonous album. Despite some high points with featured artists, the overall impact was limited. Akan stated, "the final product is one dimensional, and sometimes, too monotonous to make a lasting impact," rating the album 3 out of 5. Okon Ekpo of YNaija highlighted that while Solidstar attracts high-profile collaborations on the album, he struggles to create a cohesive and engaging album on his own. Ekpo criticized W.E.E.D. for its lack of originality and overlong tracklist. He concluded, "Even after 23 songs, Solid Star is still as blank as he was when he first arrived." Temitope Delano of tooXclusive noted that the album sticks to his familiar dancehall and highlife sounds, resulting in a one-dimensional project. Despite a few standout tracks and guest features, the album suffered from inconsistent quality and lacked cohesion. Delano concluded, "this album is a deep compilation of singles and should have just remained that way," rating it 3 out of 5.

== Track listing ==
All tracks produced by Pbanks except where noted.

W.E.E.D. track listing
No.	Title	Writer(s)	Producer(s)	Length
1.	"Emergency"	Joshua Iniyezo		3:01
2.	"Nwa Baby" (featuring 2Baba)	Iniyezo; Innocent Idibia		3:30
3.	"Silicon" (featuring Timaya)	Iniyezo; Initimi Odon		3:01
4.	"Shokor"	Iniyezo		2:48
5.	"Trigger Me" (featuring Mr Eazi)	Iniyezo; Oluwatosin Ajibade		2:50
6.	"Wait Refix" (featuring Tiwa Savage and Patoranking)	Iniyezo; Tiwatope Savage; Patrick Okorie		4:41
7.	"Money" (featuring Diamond Platnumz)	Iniyezo; Naseeb Juma		3:52
8.	"Legit" (featuring Flavour and Phyno)	Iniyezo; Chinedu Okoli; Chibuzor Azubuike		4:28
9.	"Girlfriend" (featuring Burna Boy)	Iniyezo; Damini Ogulu	Kukbeatz	3:13
10.	"Find Dem Go" (featuring Oritse Femi)	Iniyezo; Oritsefemi Majemite		3:13
11.	"Sharp" (featuring Duncan Mighty)	Iniyezo; Duncan Mighty	Del B	3:28
12.	"Flirt"	Iniyezo		3:27
13.	"Ghetto" (featuring Reminisce)	Iniyezo; Remilekun Safaru		2:18
14.	"Fashion Killer"	Iniyezo		3:22
15.	"Wait" (featuring Davido)	Iniyezo; David Adeleke		3:47
16.	"Ebelebe" (featuring Zoro and Jojo)	Iniyezo; Owoh Chrismathner; Jojo		3:14
17.	"Telemi" (featuring Attitude)	Iniyezo; Destiny Eghomwanre		2:47
18.	"Mama" (featuring Falz)	Iniyezo; Folarin Falana		3:02
19.	"For You"	Iniyezo	Orbeat	2:54
20.	"Elegba" (featuring Small Doctor)	Iniyezo; Adekunle Temitope		2:39
21.	"Obatago" (featuring Harrysong)	Iniyezo; Harrison Okiri		3:10
Total length:				68:00

== Personnel ==
Credits adapted from back cover.

- Pbanks — production
- Kukbeatz — production
- Del B — production
- Orbeat — production
- Brain Mix — mixing
- Swaps — mixing
- Suka — mixing
- Fiokee — live guitar

== Release history ==
Release history and formats for W.E.E.D.
Region	Date	Format	Label
Worldwide	31 October 2016	Streaming; digital download	Achievas
