= Genoese knife =

The Genoese knife is a type of knife originating and manufactured in the city of Genoa.

Certain types of Genoese knives have a shape similar to a dagger or stylet and are therefore prohibited. Its use was especially common in the territory of the Republic of Genoa from the 17th to 18th centuries. Knives of this type were a tool for work or everyday use. They could also be worn decoratively. Genoese-style knives are still used today, known for their constructive properties. Wearing a Genoese knife can lead to arrest, since it is forbidden to carry.

The origin of the Genoese knife itself is ambiguous, since it is both a useful tool in everyday life and a practical combat weapon, with a rather low cost of manufacture. Subsequently, the knives are made mainly by representatives of the criminal world, both historically and today.

In addition, some representatives of different sectors of society began to include some features and elements of the Genoese knife, into other knives. This contributed to the spread of Genoese knife styles in other parts of Italy, especially in Corsica, as there were found many specimens that showed influence from the Genoese knife.

== Distinctive characteristics ==
The handle of the Genoese knife is usually without a guard, slightly asymmetrical in shape compared to the blade. Very often the handle is made of olive wood, sage or laurel, which was popular in the 18th century in Genoa. In this case, the handle is called "perno" or "pernetto". The handle of the Genoese knife usually does not condense to increase the penetration and resistance at impact.

There are different types of grips of the Genoese knife, varying in shape, material, and finish. Knife grips could also be made of metal or ivory in rare cases. A unique specimen of an 18th century Genovese knife made from ivory is represented in the collection of Butteen of the Medieval Arms Museum in Bologna, Lionello Shara. The knife was presented in the museum's catalog in 1991.

The shape of the blade of the Genoese knife can be both rectangular and elliptical, with pointed tip, and without a tip. Efficiency and purpose are taken into account due to the knife having a wide range of uses. This includes being for kitchen work, and for sewing sails, leather, shipment of wagons and many other applications, including criminal use.

== Types of Genoese Knives ==
Among many types of Genoese knife, repetitive features of style, shape, technical details can be combined.

Depending on the shapes and types of blades and handles, Genoese knives come in the following forms:

- knives canonical with a sharp tip or without a tip
- with a finger rest (passacorda)
- with double-finger stop (passacorda)
- for throwing
- with additional finger rest
- with a secret blade
- knife knives
- decorated

Some specimens of Genoese knives may include more than one of these design elements. However, classification is not rigidly structured, since each kind of knife lends itself to potentially further variation, providing other ways of categorization.

== Use ==
Undoubtedly, these weapons are dangerous and can cause significant harm in a combat encounter (for example, at the Tenth Council of the Most Serene Republic of Genoa, September 9, 1699, an announcement was made on the prohibition of the use of the Genoese knife in the port).

After the knife was banned, the Genoese tried to hide their weapons in order to circumvent the laws of the city. Under these prevailing conditions, some elements of the Genoese knife's shape were modified. Masters of the Republic of Genoa began to produce a more "sharp knife", which began to increase in popularity. The references to the existence of this kind of Genoese knife and knife art began to be much more often mentioned in documented and archival sources dating back to the second half of the 12th century.

The Genoa fencing technique contains a huge part of working with the Genoese knife.

== Literature ==
- Mikhailova O. E., Shelkovnikov BA Western European weapons of the XV-XVII centuries, the State Hermitage. Art (publishing house), 1955. 40 p.
- Repertoire of amateur performances, 1975
- Romana di lesa maestà per la C. e F. contro Tommaso di Andrea Vivarelli … ristretto del processo informativo. Stato pontificio : Tribunale criminale supremo della Consulta, Stamp. della Rev. Cam. Apost., 1837. — P. 510 — 527 p.
- Vocabolario domestico genovese-italiano: con un' appendice zoologica, Angelo Paganini, 1837 — 297 p.
- Bastone Genovese, Coltello e Gambetto, Claudio Parodi. CreateSpace Independent Publishing Platform, 2012. — 240 p.
- Miracoli della Madonna della Quercia di Viterbo e sua istoria con nuovo ordine ed aggiunta del padre F. Nicolo' Maria Torelli dell’Ordine de' predicatori, Nicolo' Maria Torelli. presso Camillo Tosoni, 1827. 238 p.
- Primizie chirurgico-pratiche della cura delle ferite. Osservazioni e corollari di Gaetano Bartoli. All’Eccellenza del sig. Co. Filippo Hercolani. Gaetano Bartoli, per gli eredi di Bernardino Pomatelli impressori, 1714. — 95 p.
- Miracoli della Madona della quercia di viterbo e sua istoria, Nicolo Maria Torelli, Poletti, 1725
- L’arte del ferro nel Ducato Estense: decorazioni architettoniche e oggetti da collezione, Giorgio Boccolari, Calderini, 1996. 199 p.
- Il segretario istruito, e Lettere di don Isidoro Nardi agl’illustrissimi signori marchesi Francesco e Gaspero Perez Verguero … parte prima, Том 1, 1700. — 288 p.
- Compendio della Storia della … Imagine di Maria Santissima del buen consiglio, 1756
- Genoa and the Genoese, 958—1528, Steven A. Epstein, Steven Epstein, University of North Carolina Press, 2001. — 396 p.
- The Genoa Dialogues, J. Hayes Hurley, Lulu.com, 2014. — 158 p.
- Crónicas de la mafia: Crónica negra, Íñigo Domínguez, Libros del K.O., 2015 — 431 p.
- Il segretario principiante, ed istruito. Lettere moderne di D. Isidoro Nardi … Parte prima [- Parte seconda], Isidoro Nardi, presso Francesco Storti, 1739
- Compendio istorico-cronologico della vita e miracoli del b. Giuseppe Calasanzio fondatore de' Cher. Reg. Pov. della Madre di Dio delle Scuole Pie scritto dal padre Vincenzio Talenti sacerdote dell’istess’Ordine, Vincenzo Talenti, nella stamperia di S. Michele per Ottavio Puccinelli(IS), 1748. — 200 p.
- Das Schwert des Volkes: Geschichte, Kultur und Methodik des traditionellen, italienischen Messerkampfes, Roberto Laura, tredition, 2015. — 672 p.
- Catalogo della armeria reale: illustrato con incisioni in legno, Armeria reale (Turin, Italy), Angelo Angelucci, G. Candeletti, 1890. — 614 p.
- Guida del raccoglitore e dell ̕amatore di armi antiche, Jacopo Gelli, U. Hoepli, 1900. — 434 p.
