= Masterkraft =

Masterkraft may refer to:

- Masterkraft (producer), a record producer
- MSTRKRFT, a Canadian electronic music group
