= Kwarikwa =

Single by Flavour N'abania featuring Fally Ipupa

from the album Blessed
- Released: July 31, 2012
- Genre: Igbo highlife
- Length: 3:42
- Label: 2nite Entertainment
- Songwriters: Flavour N'abania; Fally Ipupa
- Producer: Masterkraft

Flavour N'abania singles chronology
"Oyi Remix" (2012)	"Kwarikwa" (2012)	"Baby Oku" (2012)

Music video
- "Kwarikwa (Remix)" on YouTube

"Kwarikwa" is a song by the Nigerian singer Flavour. It was released as the lead single from his third studio album, Blessed (2012), and features vocals by Congolese singer Fally Ipupa. "Kwarikwa" is a love song with an uptempo beat.

== Background and release ==
"Kwarikwa" was co-written by Flavour and Fally Ipupa and produced by Masterkraft. The song originally appeared on Flavour's second studio album, Uplifted (2010). Flavour and his management decided to make a remix of "Kwarikwa" after the success of the original song.

== Music video ==
The music video for "Kwarikwa" was shot and directed in the United States by Godfather Production. Fally Ipupa's scenes were shot in a studio, while the rest of the video was shot at residential locations. Masterkraft made a cameo appearance in the video.

== Controversy surrounding the original version ==
A legal dispute between Flavour and the Ghanaian duo Wutah over the purported theft of "Kwarikwa" was reported by The NET on August 29, 2012. As stated in the article, Wutah's song "Kotosa" was imitated in "Kwarikwa". The duo accused Flavour of stealing their song's rhythm, chorus and tempo.

== Track listing ==
Digital single

No.	Title	Writer(s)	Producer(s)	Length
1.	"Kwarikwa (Remix)"	Flavour N'abania and Fally Ipupa	Masterkraft	3:42

== Video release history ==
Country	Date	Format	Label
Nigeria	July 31, 2012	Digital download	2nite Entertainment
