= Thankful (Flavour album) =

Studio album by Flavour
- Released: 14 November 2014
- Genre: Afro pop; gospel; reggae; makossa; funk; disco; electro-pop; hip-hop
- Length: 76:26
- Label: 2nite Entertainment
- Producer: Masterkraft; Selebobo; Del B; MJ; Fiokee

Flavour chronology
Blessed (2012)	Thankful (2014)	Ijele the Traveler (2017)

Singles from Thankful
- 1. "Wake Up" Released: 5 September 2014; 2. "Golibe" Released: 1 December 2014; 3. "Ololufe" Released: 10 February 2015; 4. "Wiser" Released: 22 October 2015; 5. "Dance" Released: 1 April 2016; 6. "Mmege Mmege" Released: 28 June 2016

Thankful is the fourth studio album by Nigerian singer Flavour. It was released unannounced on 14 November 2014 by 2nite Entertainment, and features guest appearances from Chidinma, M.I, Wande Coal, Selebobo, and Phyno. Its production was handled by Masterkraft, Selebobo, Del B, MJ, and Fiokee. Thankful was supported by the singles "Wake Up", "Golibe", "Ololufe", "Wiser", "Dance", and "Mmege Mmege". The album serves as a follow-up to his third studio album Blessed (2012).

== Composition ==
The album opens with "Keneya", a gospel-inspired thanksgiving song. "Ololufe", a duet with Chidinma, blends Yoruba and Igbo lyrics in a mellow love ballad. "Dance" is built on classic highlife guitar rhythms, while "Orinado" takes a smoother tempo. The Wande Coal-assisted "Wake Up" incorporates makossa influences and was criticized for its energy, being described by critics as "noise".

"Golibe" is an Igbo love ballad, and "Wiser", featuring Phyno and M.I, combines highlife with hip-hop in a reflection on heartbreak. "Nwayo Nwayo" contains funk and disco elements, while "Nwanyi Mbaise" is an electro-pop and highlife fusion. "Mmege", featuring Selebobo, presents a celebratory highlife track and "Special One" adopts a reggae style. The album also includes tracks with sensual themes such as "Sexy Rosey" and the closer "Pick Up Your Phone".

== Singles ==
The Masterkraft-produced "Wake Up" featuring Wande Coal was released as the album's lead single on 5 September 2014. The music video for "Wake Up" was directed by Clarence Peters, filmed on the streets of Lagos during the early morning hours. The album's second single, "Golibe" was released on 1 December 2014. Its accompanying music video, also directed by Clarence Peters, features an alternate audio mix from the album version, and stars Flavour searching for his love interest, played by Anna Banner. The video contains a cameo appearance by Pete Edochie. The Chidinma-assisted "Ololufe" was released as the album's third single, alongside its music video on 10 February 2015. "Ololufe"'s music video was filmed in Cape Town by Godfather Productions, and attracted attention from a scene where Flavour and Chidinma kiss, which led speculation about their relationship. Chidinma later dismissed the rumours in an interview with HipTV.

The album's fourth single, "Wiser", was released on 22 October 2015. features M.I and Phyno, and was produced by Masterkraft. Its accompanying music video was directed by Clarence Peters and explores the theme of infidelity from the perspective of a woman as the unfaithful partner. Flavour explained that he wanted to challenge the conventional portrayal of cheating, which is usually shown from the male perspective. "Dance" was released as the album's fifth single on 1 April 2016. The Clarence Peters-directed music video for "Dance" has been said to bear resemblance to the music video for Justin Bieber's "Sorry. The sixth single, "Mmege Mmege", features Selebobo and was released on 28 June 2016.

== Critical reception ==
Professional ratings
Review scores
Source	Rating
tooXclusive	3/5 stars
Pulse Nigeria	4/5 stars

Wilfred Okiche of 360nobs praised the "traditional instruments and pseudo highlife" but criticized the album's "lazy delivery and thoughtless arrangement". Okiche concluded that "Thankful is an album from a successful artiste who has lost plenty of his hunger and with his slumming days far behind him, fancies himself too big to bother."

Ayomide Tayo, reviewing for Pulse Nigeria, awarded Thankful 4 out of 5 stars, calling it a "strong, vibrant album composed by a master of the flavours of music", and rated it a 4/5. tooXclusive's Jim Donnett commended Flavour for trying to "diversify by stepping out of his comfort zone", criticizing the album's "disarrangement" and arguing that it "loses it's balance and composure" through inconsistent genre and tempo changes. Donnett concluded that "Thankful is a keeper with a fine selection of tracks that will grow on you as time passes" and awarded it 3 out of 5 stars.

=== Accolades ===
Awards and nominations for Thankful
Organization	Year	Category	Result	Ref.
Nigeria Entertainment Awards	2015	Album of the Year	Won	
All Africa Music Awards	2015	Album of the Year	Nominated	

== Track listing ==
Thankful track listing
No.	Title	Writer(s)	Producer(s)	Length
1.	"Keneya"	Chinedu Okoli	Masterkraft	4:05
2.	"Ololufe" (featuring Chidinma)	Okoli; Chidinma Ekile	MJ	3:18
3.	"Dance"	Okoli	Del B	3:22
4.	"Orinado"	Okoli	Masterkraft	4:16
5.	"Wake Up" (featuring Wande Coal)	Okoli; Oluwatobi Ojosipe	Masterkraft	3:45
6.	"Golibe"	Jerry Chukwu	Masterkraft	3:57
7.	"Wiser" (featuring M.I and Phyno)	Okoli; Jude Abaga; Chibuzor Azubuike	Masterkraft	4:05
8.	"Nwayo Nwayo"	Okoli	Masterkraft	4:10
9.	"Skit" (featuring Waga G and Onyii)	Okoli	—	1:33
10.	"Sexy Rosey"	Okoli	Masterkraft	4:11
11.	"Nwanyi Mbaise"	Okoli	Masterkraft	3:44
12.	"Special One"	Okoli	Masterkraft	3:51
13.	"Ife Adigomma"	Okoli	Masterkraft	4:52
14.	"Mmege Mmege" (featuring Selebobo)	Okoli; Udoka Oku	Selebobo	3:34
15.	"Skit" (featuring Oloye, Jerry Cee, Whad Up, and Waga G)	Okoli	—	1:27
16.	"Uru Dia (Shake 2)"	Okoli	Masterkraft	3:47
17.	"Inasonki"	Okoli	Masterkraft	4:24
18.	"Believe"	Okoli	Masterkraft	4:15
19.	"Munachi"	Okoli	Masterkraft	3:49
20.	"Igbo Amaka"	Okoli	Masterkraft	3:57
21.	"Pick Up Your Phone"	Okoli	Fiokee; Flavour; MJ	2:04
Total length:				76:26

Notes

- "—" denotes a skit

== Personnel ==
Credits adapted from back cover.

- Chinedu "Flavour" Okoli — songwriting, composition, guitars
- Masterkraft — production (tracks 1, 4, 5, 6, 7, 8, 10, 11, 12, 13, 16, 17, 18, 19, 20)
- MJ — production (track 2, 21)
- Del B — production (track 3)
- Selebobo — production (track 14)
- Fiokee — production (track 21), guitars
- Rhodee — guitars
- Simi Iyke — guitars
- Peter Sax — horns
- Waga G — engineering
- Foster Zeeno — mixing, mastering
- TCD Photography — photography
- Metrotek — artwork

== Release history ==
Release history and formats for Thankful
Region	Date	Format	Label
Various	14 November 2014	CD; digital download	2nite Entertainment
