= Ejyk Nwamba =

Nigerian musician

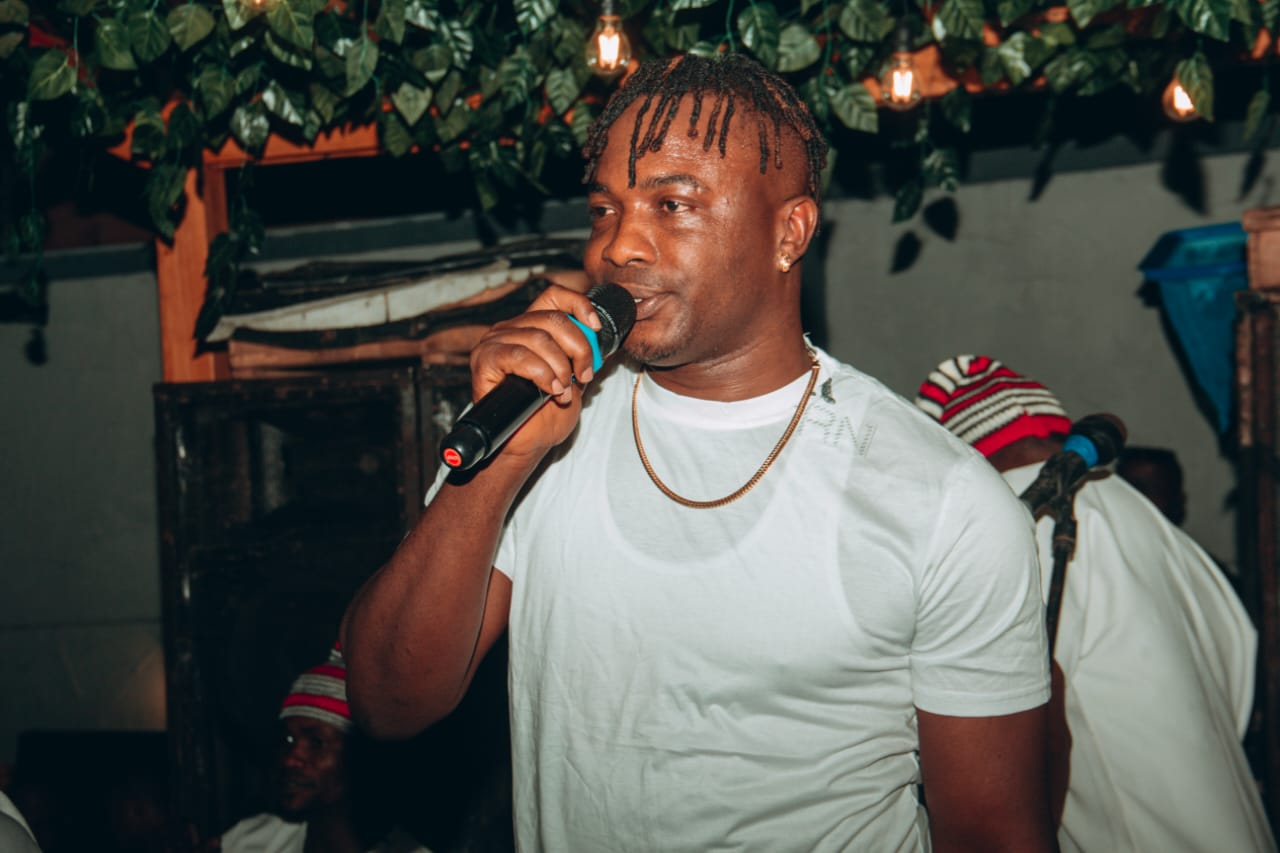
- Ejyk Nwamba performing in Abuja (2021)

Background information
- Also known as: Ogene master
- Born: Ejike Benedict Obiano; Enugu State
- Origin: Anambra State, Nigeria
- Genres: Igbo Highlife, Ogene music
- Occupation: Musician
- Instrument: Ogene

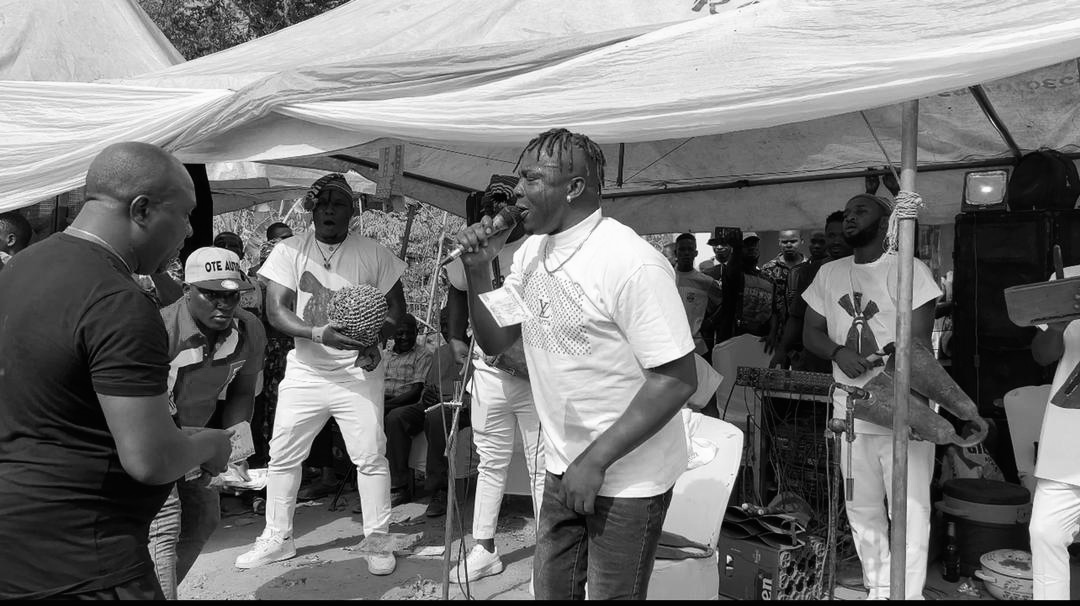
Nwamba performing in the Niger Delta region of southern Nigeria, Rivers State.

Ejike Benedict Obiano known professionally as Ejyk Nwamba or Ogene master, is a Nigerian musician from Anambra State. One of the front men in Ogene music, a musical style which is popular in the Eastern part of Nigeria, Nwamba is regarded as the best Ogene musician in Igboland. He is the recipient of several accolades, including Artist of the Year at the 2021 Ukpor Special Awards and Best Indigenous Artist of the Year at the 2022 Anambra Legends Achievers Awards.

Ejyk Nwamba is the founder and leader of Ogene Ubo Mma Group, his musical band.

== Biography ==
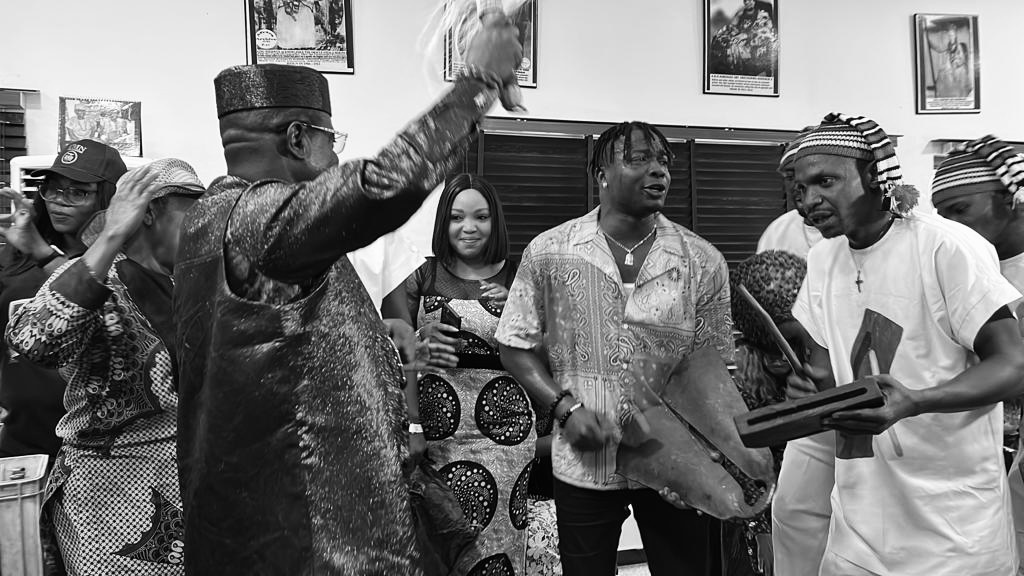
Ejyk Nwamba performing for Monarch of Delta State, Ogiame Atuwatse III.

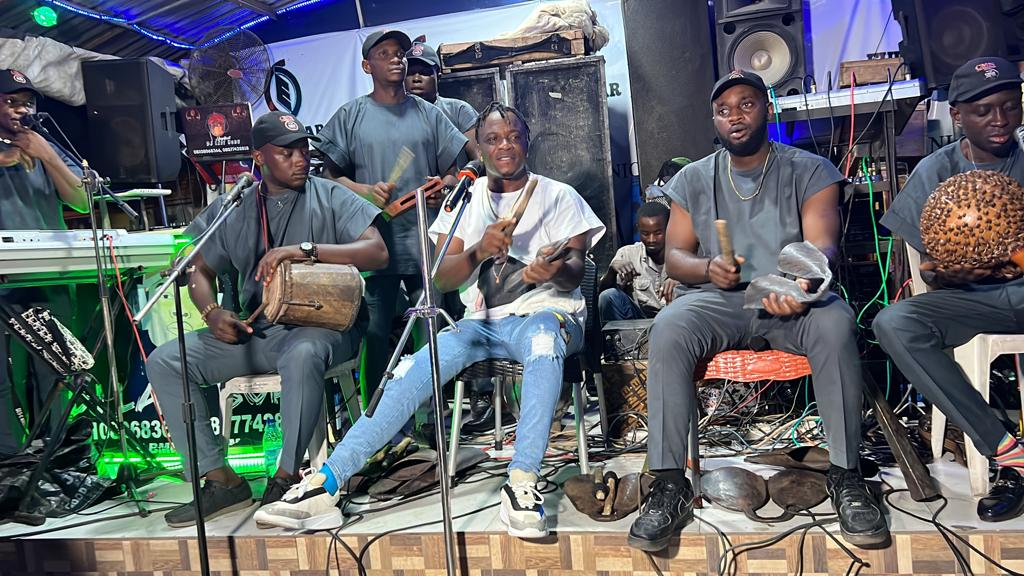
Ejyk Nwamba and his musical band

Nwamba was born in Enugu, a state in the southeastern region of Nigeria. He picked an interest in music at a young age and was passionate about it and cultural instruments and learnt it by watching people play it. He started his career in the church as a performer in the early 2000s where he would perform at churches, weddings, and cultural meetings. Nwamba started publishing his music on music streaming platforms in the late 2010s.

His music is a mixture of Ogene music, Igbo highlife and mainstream Nigerian music fused with traditional tunes and chants. Ejyk Nwamba recreates mainstream Nigerian music like Afrobeats in a cultural way, and has successfully worked with mainstream Nigerian musicians including Flavour, Zoro, Kola Boy and others.

His breakthrough was “Aja Wele Wele” which was released in 2019. In 2020, he released his debut extended play with the same title “Aja Wele Wele” and was accompanied with music videos.

Nwamba has performed in all most all the states in Nigeria and made his United Arab Emirates performance debut in 2022.

== Artistry ==
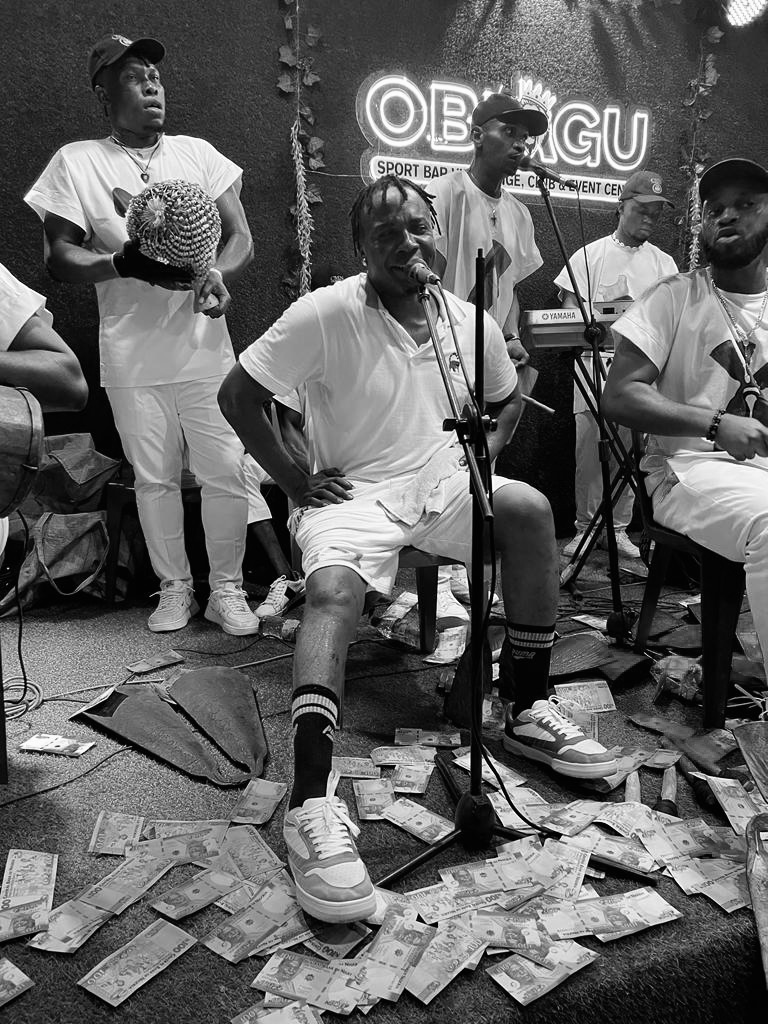
Ejyk Nwamba performing in Lagos State

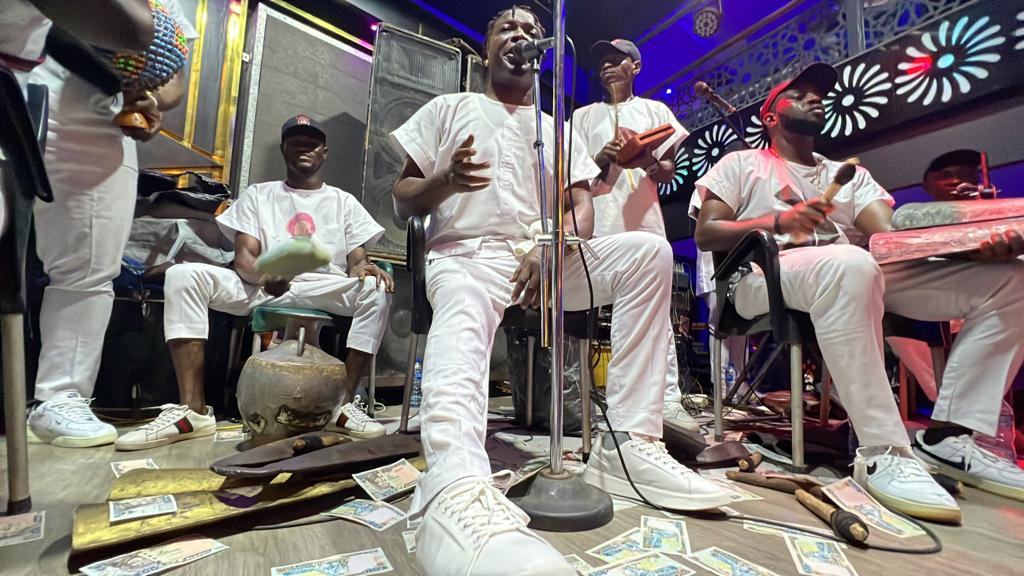
Ejyk Nwamba and band

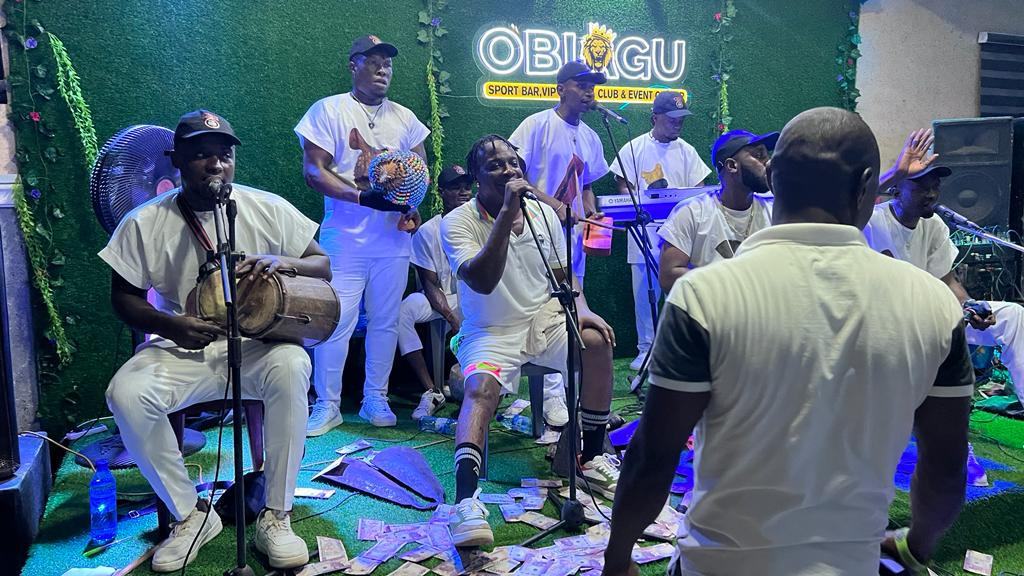

Nwamba music has been dubbed as “Ogene Cultural Praise”. He sings in Igbo language, and sings in English when recreating mainstream music. His music deploys Igbo instruments such as the Slit drum, ogene, ichaka, ekwe, and Ọjà which is known in English language as flute. His lyrics are centered in promotion of his culture, inheritance and his journey of life.

== Education ==
Nwamba studied Mass communication at Enugu State University in Nigeria.

== Discography ==
=== Albums ===
- Ndi Ogene Ejebego Uka (2021)

=== EPs ===
- Aja Wele Wele (2020)

=== Singles ===
- “Business Trip”
- Kawaii
- “Ifeoma”
- “Ogene Cultural Praise”
- “Kawaii”
- “Arusi Ego Special”
- “Akwa Okuku Special”
- “Obama First Son Special”
- “Mmilienweilo Special”
- “Ubo”
- “Gbawalum Oji”
- Ihe ome emee
- Ogenepiano
- Arusi Ego
- “Clear road”
- “I do for you”
- “limitless (agwu agwu)
