= Flavour of Africa =

Studio album by Flavour
- Released: December 4, 2020
- Genre: Afrobeats; Highlife; R n B Afro-Pop
- Length: 55:00
- Language: English; Pidgin; Igbo
- Label: 2Night Music Group
- Producer: Chinedu Okoli

Flavour chronology
Awele (2018)	Flavour of Africa (2020)

Flavour of Africa is the seventh studio album by Nigerian singer Flavour. It was released on December 4, 2020.

== Background ==
The album which has a running time of 55 minutes is a 15-track music project which features Fally Ipupa, Tekno, Phyno, Biggie Igba, Beenie Man, Waga G and Larry Gaaga. It also has the guest act of Odumeje. Production credits of the album goes to Masterkraft, Rotimi Keys, Selebobo, Spax, Stadic, Jonny Blaze, Marvio and DJ Tunez.

== Singles ==
Flavour released Looking Nyash as a single from the album. The song is about the allure of the African woman's backside, and Flavour celebrates and elevates it.

== Reception ==
Professional ratings
Review scores
Source	Rating
Pulse Nigeria	6.9/10
TooXclusive	8/10

Motolani Alake of Pulse Nigeria opined that the tracklists could have done with a few tweaks, and that the album could have also done without "Sawa Sawa", "Odoyewu" and "Omeihoma". He also noted that "Flavour is unrepentantly African on the album - its title is perfect." In a nutshell, he rated the album 6.9/10.

While reviewing the album, Dozie Asogwa and Chioma Onyefuosaonu of TooXclusive noted that Flavour's attempt to capture elements that show African diversity was well done, further saying that "For an intentional art created and a piece that might be able to transcend time, this album Flavour of Africa is rated a 8/10".

This Day in an article noted that a track from the album, "Looking Nyash", was getting negative reviews following a scene in which Flavour carried a naked lady on his shoulders.

== Track listing ==
No.	Title	Length
1.	"Flavour of Africa"	1:59
2.	"Good Woman"	5:09
3.	"Berna" (featuring Fally Ipupa and Tekno)	3:58
4.	"Looking Nyash"	3:02
5.	"Omo T'emi"	3:55
6.	"Egwu Ndi Oma"	3:44
7.	"Skit" (featuring Odumeje)	0:39
8.	"Doings" (featuring Phyno)	3:50
9.	"Product of Grace"	3:54
10.	"Umuigbo" (featuring Biggie Igba)	3:46
11.	"Sawa Sawa" (featuring Beenie Man)	3:42
12.	"Beer Parlour Discussions" (featuring Waga G)	5:58
13.	"Odoyewu"	3:45
14.	"Ebube"	3:35
15.	"Omeiheoma"	1:07
16.	"Bestie" (featuring Larry Gaaga)	3:17
Total length:		55:00
