= Terry Apala =

- Born: Terry Alexandar Ejeh; 27 July 1988 (age 38); Mushin, Lagos State, Nigeria
- Origin: Port Harcourt , Rivers State, Nigeria
- Genres: Apala, Afrobeats, hip-hop
- Occupations: Singer, performer
- Instruments: Voice, drums, guitar
- Years active: 2010–present

Terry Alexandar Ejeh (born 27 July 1988), better known by his stage name Terry Apala, is a Nigerian Afrobeat, hip-hop and Apala (traditional Yoruba music) musician.

== Background and early career ==
Terry Apala was born and raised in Mushin, Lagos, Nigeria, where he was introduced to the diverse sounds of Nigerian music at an early age. His musical interests were deeply influenced by the rhythmic and percussive nature of Apala music, a traditional genre associated with the Yoruba ethnic group. His early musical experiences began in the church where he learned to play the drums and guitar, nurturing his passion for music.

=== Solo career ===
Apala left the group and decided to embark on a solo career. He released his debut mix trap "Champagne Shower" which launched him into the mainstream.

Apala was nominated for Rookie of the Year at the 2016 Headies Awards, and "Most Promising Act to Watch" at the 2016 Nigeria Entertainment Awards.

On 14 April 2017 he released a cover of Ed Sheeran's single "Shape of You". The cover won him "Best Music Cover of the Year (International)" at the City People Music Awards 2017. That same year, Apala was nominated for Apala Artiste of the Year.

He was featured on Reminisce's 2016 song " Skit".

=== Major Vibes EP (2020) ===
Apala released his first music project, Major Vibes, a six-track EP, on 13 August 2020. It features no other artiste, but was released with the collaboration of music producer/serial hit-maker Major Bangz, who produced all the tracks on the EP.

== Singles ==
As lead artist

Year	Title	Album	Ref
2026	"Apaladisskizzy" ft Mavo	—N/a	
2026	"Touchdown"	—N/a	
2025	"Omo Oro Mi"	Black & White	
2025	"Bride Price" ft Bella Shmurda	Black & White	
2024	"Apala Disco (Remix)" ft Wizkid & Seyi Vibez	—N/a	
2024	"FLEX"	Black & White	
2023	"Apala Disco" ft DJ Tunez	APALA DISCO	
2022	"TGIF"	ÀÀRE	
2021	"Kamba"	—N/a	
2020	"No Sege" x CDQ	—N/a	
2020	"Lock Up" ft Niniola	—N/a	
2019	"Bread and Beans" ft Zoro	—N/a	
2019	"Apala Wifi"	—N/a	
2018	"Keep Them Talking"	—N/a	
2018	"Mushin" (Barking cover)	—N/a	
2018	"Baca"	—N/a	
2018	"Joosi"	—N/a	
2017	"Bad Girl" ft Bisola	—N/a	
2017	"Feel Me"	—N/a	
2017	"Social Media"	—N/a	
2017	"Palongo" ft Musiliu Ishola	—N/a	
2017	"Mgbor"	—N/a	
2016	"Mo Popular"	—N/a	
2016	"Omidan"	—N/a	
2016	"Champagne Showers"	—N/a	

As featured artist

Year	Title	Album	Ref
2025	"Energy", Debra Can featuring Terry Apala	—N/a	
2025	"Reality", Candy Bleakz featuring Terry Apala	—N/a	
2024	"Evil People", Eddie King featuring Terry Apala	—N/a	
2021	"Manya", Amzy B, Kaylex featuring Terry Apala	—N/a	

== Awards and nominations ==
Year	Award ceremony	Award description	Result	Ref
2016	The Headies	Rookie of the Year	Nominated	
2016	Nigeria Entertainment Awards	Most Promising Act to Watch	Nominated	
2017	City People Music Award	Best Music Cover of the Year (International)	Won	
2017	City People Music Award	Apala Artiste of the Year	Nominated	
