= Oyi (song) =

- Remix cover

Single by Flavour N'abania featuring Tiwa Savage

from the album Uplifted
- Released: 18 April 2010 (original); 18 February 2012 (remix)
- Genre: R&B; highlife
- Length: 3:20
- Label: 2nite Entertainment
- Songwriters: Flavour N'abania; Tiwa Savage
- Producer: Jaystuntz

Flavour N'abania singles chronology
"Odiro Easy" (2011)	"Oyi" (2010)	"Kwarikwa (Remix)" (2012)

Tiwa Savage singles chronology
"Beremole" (2012)	"Oyi (remix)" (2012)	"Oma Ga" (2012)

Music video
- "Oyi Remix" on YouTube

"Oyi" is a song by Nigerian singer Flavour N'abania, released on 18 April 2010. It serves as the lead single from his second studio album Uplifted (2010). The song's official remix features vocals by Tiwa Savage.

== Background and music video ==
"Oyi" was released on 18 April 2010, and serves as the lead single from the album Uplifted. The song's accompanying music video was filmed by Bobby Hai in Nigeria, Ghana, Brazil and the U.K. Flavour and Tiwa Savage composed the remix of "Oyi". Before the release of the song's music video, Flavour promoted the song on Twitter. Savage recorded her a rendition of the song prior to recording the official remix with Flavour. A Nigerian studio served as the location for the video. Unnamed places in Nigeria were also used for filming the original version.

== Accolades ==
The remix of "Oyi" was nominated for Best R&B Single at The Headies 2011. The song's music video won Best R&B Video at the 2012 Channel O Music Video Awards.

== Track listing ==
Digital single

No.	Title	Writer(s)	Length
1.	"Oyi (Remix)"	Flavour N'abania and Tiwa Savage	3:20
2.	"Oyi (Remix) (Tiwa Savage Remix)"	Tiwa Savage	1:45
