= Lasso of Truth (album) =

Studio album by Omawumi
- Released: 23 March 2013
- Genre: Afrobeat; EDM; jazz; R&B; Reggae
- Length: 47:14
- Label: Oma Records
- Producer: Cobhams Asuquo; Don Jazzy; Sizzle Pro; Oscar Heman-Ackah; Young D; Sarz; Soso Soberekon; E Kelly; Philkeyz

Omawumi chronology
Wonder Woman (2009)	Lasso of Truth (2013)	Timeless (2017)

Singles from Lasso of Truth
- 1. "If You Ask Me" Released: 10 January 2011; 2. "I Go Go" Released: 18 May 2011; 3. "Bottom Belle" Released: 6 January 2012; 4. "Stay Alive (Jeje Laye)" Released: 23 November 2012; 5. "You Must Love Me" Released: 11 January 2014

Deluxe edition cover
- Lasso of Truth (Deluxe Edition)

Singles from Lasso of Truth (Deluxe Edition)
- 1. "Somori" Released: 9 August 2013; 2. "Finally" Released: 11 February 2014

Lasso of Truth is the second studio album by the Nigerian singer Omawumi. It was released on 23 March 2013 through Oma Records and features guest appearances from Timaya, Wizkid, Flavour, 2Face Idibia, and Afay. Production was handled by Cobhams Asuquo, Don Jazzy, Sizzle Pro, Oscar Heman-Ackah, Young D, Sarz, and Soso Soberekon on the standard edition, with additional production from E Kelly and Philkeyz on the deluxe edition. Lasso of Truth serves as a follow-up to Omawumi's debut, Wonder Woman (2009). The deluxe edition of the album was released on 12 September 2013.

== Launch party ==
The launch party for Lasso of Truth was held at the Oriental Hotel in Lagos on 7 April 2013. The event featured performances by Omawumi alongside guest appearances from 2Baba, Tiwa Savage, Seyi Shay, Waje, Timaya, Wizkid, and Onyeka Onwenu. The concert opened with a performance by Mercy Chinwo, after which Omawumi performed several songs from the album. During the show, Omawumi dedicated a song to her mother, who was present in the audience, and later performed alongside Tiwa Savage, Seyi Shay, and Waje on renditions of "No Woman, No Cry" and "Thank You Lord, Hallelujah", which received a standing ovation. Omawumi performed "Ekwe" with Onyeka Onwenu, later performing with Timaya and Wizkid. Near the end of the concert, Omawumi introduced Herbert Udemba, the original songwriter of "Bottom Belle".

== Singles ==
=== Standard edition ===
The album's lead single, "If You Ask Me", was released on 10 January 2011. The song was produced by Cobhams Asuquo and is an introspective narrative about child sexual abuse. It aligns with Omawumi's advocacy work as an Ambassador for Project Alert, an organization focused on issues of sexual abuse and reproductive health. The second single, "I Go Go", was released on 18 May 2011 alongside a music video directed by Clarence Peters. Also produced by Cobhams Asuquo, it is a "reggae infused track in which Omawumi sings of unrequited love in pidgin English on a subtle reggae beat that once again shows off her show her vast vocal range."

The third single, "Bottom Belle," often shortened to "Belle," and released on 6 February 2012, features Flavour. The song was produced by Soso Soberekon. Omawumi described the song as her "witty way of telling the story of an opinionated young Nigerian woman who wants and fully intends to enjoy her life." In an interview with Encomium Magazine, Omawumi stated that the song is about "a young woman who told a guy that loves her to be free handed a bit". The song was nominated for Best Collabo at the 2013 Nigeria Entertainment Awards. The fourth single off Lasso of Truth, "Stay Alive (Jeje Laye)", was released on 23 November 2012. It was produced by Sizzle Pro and is a mid-tempo blues track that encourages listeners to approach life with caution and perseverance. On 12 September 2013, Omawumi released the Mega-directed music video for "Warn Yourself". Shot in Brooklyn and Lagos, the video omits Wizkid's verse. It features choreography coordinated by Victor Sho and Kaffy. The fifth and final single off the album was "You Must Love Me", which was released on 11 January 2014. It was also produced by Sizzle Pro.

=== Deluxe edition ===
"Somori" was released on 9 August 2013 as the lead single off the deluxe edition and the sixth single overall. It features vocals from Remy Kayz and production from Philkeyz. It is a mix of Yoruba and pidgin English and a blend of afro-pop and dancehall. The second single off the deluxe edition and the seventh single overall is "Finally", which was released on 11 February 2014 alongside the fifth single overall "You Must Love Me" and "Serious Love Nwantinti (Remix)". It was produced by E Kelly.

== Critical reception ==
The album received generally positive reception from critics. In a review for OkayAfrica, Harry Itie said that Omawumi "created a work that is not only relatable but also entertaining to anyone who is a lover of good music." Ayomide Tayo of The NET rated the album a 4/5, praising its humor, use of Pidgin English, and genre mix, calling it "a well-thought-out album" that made Omawumi "a hero in my book." Wilfred Okiche of YNaija deemed the album reminiscent of her debut, although it felt "more rehash than a sequel." He praised "What a Bang Bang" featuring 2Baba and "Bottom Belle" featuring Flavour, but he found "Warn Yourself" featuring Wizkid unimpressive; he then concluded that the album was better than the rest of the albums released in 2013.

== Track listing ==
Lasso of Truth track listing; standard edition
No.	Title	Writer(s)	Producer(s)	Length
1.	"If You Ask Me"	Omawumi Megbele	Cobhams Asuquo	3:43
2.	"When the Boss Is Coming (Actor Sef Dey Run)"	Megbele; Ayorinde Faboro	Sizzle Pro	4:26
3.	"The African Way"	Megbele	Don Jazzy	3:07
4.	"The Best You Can Be"	Megbele; David Makan	Sizzle Pro	4:00
5.	"I Go Go"	Megbele	Cobhams Asuquo	4:41
6.	"What A Bang Bang" (featuring 2Face Idibia)	Megbele; Innocent Idibia; Oscar Heman-Ackah	Oscar Heman-Ackah	3:45
7.	"Personal Race" (featuring Timaya)	Megbele; Inetimi Odon; Mercy Chinwo	Young D	3:34
8.	"You Must Love Me"	Makan	Sizzle Pro	3:54
9.	"Warn Yourself" (featuring Wizkid)	Megbele; Ayodeji Balogun; Makan	Sarz	3:40
10.	"Stay Alive (Jeje Laye)"	Megbele; Makan	Sizzle Pro	3:51
11.	"Bottom Belle" (featuring Flavour)	Megbele; Chinedu Okoli; Herbert Udemba; Oligbese	Soso Soberekon	4:16
12.	"Life Goes On" (featuring Afay)	Efe Akpotu	Sizzle Pro	4:00
Total length:				58:52

Deluxe edition bonus tracks
No.	Title	Writer(s)	Producer(s)	Length
13.	"Finally"	Megbele	E Kelly	4:10
14.	"Somori" (featuring Remy Kayz)	Megbele; Remy Kayz	Philkeyz	3:17
15.	"Lasso of Truth"	Megbele	E Kelly	3:42

Notes

- "Bottom Belle" interpolates Herbert Udemba's song of the same name.

== Personnel ==
Credits adapted from back cover.

- Omawumi Megbele - vocals, songwriting
- Inetimi Odon - vocals, songwriting
- Ayodeji Balogun - vocals, songwriting
- Chinedu Okoli - vocals, songwriting
- Innocent Idibia - vocals, songwriting
- Afay - vocals, songwriting
- Cobhams Asuquo - production (track 1, 5)
- David "Sizzle Pro" Makan - production (tracks 2, 4, 8, 10, 12), songwriting (tracks 4, 8, 9, 10), mixing engineer (tracks 2, 3, 4, 7, 8, 9, 10, 12), mastering engineer (all tracks)
- Michael "Don Jazzy" Ajereh - production (track 3)
- Oscar Heman-Ackah - production (track 6), songwriter (track 6)
- Akintewe "Young D" Temidayo - production (track 7)
- Osabuohien "Sarz" Osaretin - production (track 9)
- Soso Soberekon - production (track 11)
- Emmanuel "E Kelly" Nwosu - production (tracks 13, 15)
- Phillip "Philkeyz" Chukwuka - production (track 14)
- Olaitan Dada - mixing engineer (tracks 1, 5, 6)
- Umar Jawfu - guitars (track 4)
- Ayomide Faboro - songwriting (track 2)
- Mercy Chinwo - songwriting (track 7)
- Herbert Udemba - songwriting (track 11)
- Oligbese - songwriting (track 11)

== Release history ==
Country	Date	Version	Format	Label
Various	23 March 2013	Standard	CD; digital download	Oma Records
Various	12 September 2013	Deluxe	Digital download	Oma Records
