= Nwa Baby =

2009 or 2011 single by Flavour

Single by Flavour

from the album N'abania
- Released: 21 February 2009
- Recorded: 2008
- Genre: Igbo highlife
- Length: 5:08
- Label: Obaino Music
- Songwriter: Chinedu Okoli

Flavour singles chronology
"N'abania" (2008)	"Nwa Baby" (2009)	"Nwata" (2009)

Music video
- "Nwa Baby (Official Video)" on YouTube
- "Nwa Baby (Official Original Video)" on YouTube

"Nwa Baby (Ashawo Remix)"

Single by Flavour

from the album Uplifted
- Released: 1 April 2011
- Recorded: 2010
- Genre: Igbo highlife; dancehall
- Length: 4:22
- Label: 2nite Entertainment
- Songwriter: Flavour N'abania
- Producer: JayStuntz

Flavour singles chronology
"Thank God" (2011)	"Nwa Baby (Ashawo Remix)" (2011)	"Odiro Easy" (2011)

Music video
- "Nwa Baby (Ashawo Remix)" on YouTube

"Nwa Baby" is a song by Nigerian singer Flavour, released on 21 February 2009. It appeared on the singer's debut studio album N'abania (2008). The remix, "Nwa Baby (Ashawo Remix)", was released on 1 April 2011 and serves as the third single from his second studio album Uplifted (2010). The song describes promiscuous women and was ranked third on Billboard's list of the 50 Best Afrobeats Songs of All Time.

== Background and meaning ==
"Nwa Baby" (Ashawo Remix) was written by Flavour N'abania and released on April 1, 2011. It is a remake of Cardinal Rex's 1960 hit "Sawale". "Nwa Baby" is slang for "beautiful girl", while "ashawo" is slang for a call girl. The song tells the story of a man who returns from traveling and discovers that the woman he loves has been unfaithful.

== Music video ==
The music video for "Nwa Baby" (Ashawo Remix) was released on 1 April 2011, and filmed in South Africa by Godfather Productions. The video was nominated for Most Gifted Afro-Pop Video and Most Gifted African West Video at the 2011 Channel O Music Video Awards. It was also nominated for Best High Life Video at the 2011 Nigerian Music Video Awards.

== Live performances ==
On 18 May 2013, Flavour performed "Nwa Baby" (Ashawo Remix) at People's Park in Durban, South Africa, alongside D'banj, 2Baba, Fally Ipupa, and Snoop Dogg.

== Accolades ==
Awards and nominations for "Nwa Baby (Ashawo Remix)"
Organization	Year	Category	Result	Ref.
Channel O Music Video Awards	2011	Most Gifted Afro-Pop Video	Nominated	
Channel O Music Video Awards	2011	Most Gifted African West Video	Nominated	
Nigerian Music Video Awards	2011	Best High Life Video	Nominated	
