= N'abania =

- Alternative album cover

Studio album by Flavour N'abania
- Released: 2008
- Genre: Afrobeat; R&B; Igbo highlife; hip-hop
- Length: 41:59
- Label: Obaino Music

Flavour N'abania chronology
N'abania (2008)	Uplifted (2010)

Singles from N'abania
- 1. "N'abania"; 2. "Nwata"; 3. "Nwa Baby"; 4. "Rigirigi"

N'abania is the debut studio album by Nigerian singer Flavour, released by Obaino Music in 2008. The album comprises twelve tracks and features guest appearances from Mr Raw, Prophecy and D Mustard.

== Singles ==
"N'abania", the title track, features a rap verse by Mr Raw and was released as a single. Nigerian musician J. Martins made a cameo appearance in the music video. "Nwa Baby" was also released as a single. Its music video was directed by Bobby Hai.

== Track listing ==
No.	Title	Writer(s)	Length
1.	"N'abania" (intro)	Flavour N'abania	0:28
2.	"N'abania" (featuring Mr Raw)	Chinedu Okoli; Okechukwu Ukeje	4:35
3.	"Nwata" (skit)	Okoli	0:25
4.	"Nwata"	Okoli	4:14
5.	"Nwa Baby"	Okoli	5:08
6.	"Rigirigi"	Okoli	4:29
7.	"D One" (featuring Prophecy)	Okoli; Prophecy	3:15
8.	"Ogbuolam" (featuring D Mustard)	Okoli; D Mustard	4:38
9.	"I Don Smoke Igbo" (featuring D Mustard, Prophecy, Wagga, Hype MC, and MJ)	Okoli; D Mustard	4:06
10.	"Nwata (Instrumental"		4:14
11.	"Rigirigi (Instrumental)"		4:55
12.	"D One (Instrumental)"		3:28

== Personnel ==
- Chinedu Okoli – primary artist
- Mr Raw – featured artist
- Skit – featured artist
- Prophecy – featured artist
- D Mustard – featured artist
- Bobby Hai – music video director

== Release history ==
Country/Digital platform	Date	Version	Format	Label
Nigeria; iTunes	2008	Standard	CD; digital download	Obaino Music
