= Blessed (Flavour album) =

Studio album by Flavour
- Released: October 18, 2012
- Genre: Igbo highlife
- Length: 60:53
- Label: 2nite Entertainment
- Producer: Wizboyy; Del B; Dekumzy; MJay; Masterkraft; J Stunt; Selebobo

Flavour chronology
Uplifted (2010)	Blessed (2012)	Thankful (2014)

Singles from Blessed
- 1. "Kwarikwa (Remix)" Released: July 31, 2012; 2. "Baby Oku" Released: October 5, 2012; 3. "Shake" Released: December 20, 2012; 4. "Chinny Baby" Released: February 27, 2013; 5. "Ada Ada" Released: June 30, 2013

Blessed is the third studio album by Nigerian singer Flavour. It was released on October 18, 2012, by 2nite Entertainment. The album features guest appearances from Wizboyy and Fally Ipupa. Its production was handled by Masterkraft, Wizboyy, Selebobo, MJay, Del B, J Stunt and Dekumzy. Blessed was supported by the singles "Kwarikwa (Remix)", "Baby Oku", "Shake", "Chinny Baby" and "Ada Ada". Flavour celebrated the album's release at 2nite, a night club he opened in Enugu State. He invited Tiwa Savage, Iyanya, Kcee and Bracket to attend the club's grand opening.

== Singles ==
The remix of "Kwarikwa", which features vocals by Congolese singer Fally Ipupa, was released as the album's lead single on July 31, 2012. The song's accompanying music video was shot and directed in the United States by Godfather Production. While most of the video was filmed at different residential locations, several sequences with Fally Ipupa were shot in a studio. Masterkraft made a cameo appearance in the video.

The album's second single, "Baby Oku", was released on October 5, 2012. The accompanying music video for the song was filmed in Miami by Antwan Smith. At the beginning of the video, several sky scrapers were shown and the caption "Somewhere off the Coast of Miami" was also shown.

The Del B-produced track "Shake" was released on December 20, 2012, as the album's third single. Its music video was released four days later and was shot in South Africa by Godfather Productions. On February 27, 2013, Flavour released "Chinny Baby" as the album's fourth single. The accompanying music video for the song was shot and directed in Cape Town by Trademark Pictures.

The album's fifth single, "Ada Ada", was released on June 30, 2013, along with its music video. The song peaked at number 14 on Afribiz's Top 100 Music Chart. Musically, it celebrates traditional weddings across Africa and showcases the beauty of Africa, particularly African women. Nigerian actor John Okafor and reality TV star Nwachukwu Uti made cameo appearances in the video. The music video for "Ada Ada" won Video of the Year, Best High Life Video, Best Indigenous Concept and Best Use of Costumes at the 2013 Nigeria Music Video Awards (NMVA).

== Critical reception ==
Blessed received mixed reviews from music critics. Ogagus Sakpaide of TooXclusive awarded the album 3.5 stars out of 5, acknowledging Flavour for "taking the bulls by the horn and diving deeper into the ocean of highlife". Conversely, Sakpaide said some critics may described the record as "tiresome, beer palour-ish and too eastern". Ayomide Tayo of Nigerian Entertainment Today granted the album 3 stars out of 5, criticizing it for sounding "a tad bit repetitive". Tayo acknowledged Flavour for showing dexterity, but ended the review saying the album has "a slight been here-heard that feeling."

=== Accolades ===
Blessed was nominated for Album of the Year and Best R&B/Pop Album at The Headies 2013. It was also nominated for Best Album of the Year at the 2014 Nigeria Entertainment Awards.

== Track listing ==
No.	Title	Producer(s)	Length
1.	"Baby Oku"	Dekumzy	3:56
2.	"Ikwokrikwo"	Masterkraft	3:42
3.	"Chinny Baby"	Masterkraft	4:04
4.	"Skit by Waga G"	—	0:11
5.	"Shake"	Del B	3:56
6.	"To Be A Man"	Wizboyy	4:52
7.	"Ada Ada"	Selebobo	3:53
8.	"Destiny"	Wizboyy	4:00
9.	"Black is Beautiful"	Masterkraft	3:40
10.	"Skit" (featuring Waga G, Oloye & Flavour)	—	1:37
11.	"Ifem N'eli"	M-Jay	3:27
12.	"Sweet Tomatoes"	Del B	3:29
13.	"I Don't Care" (featuring Wizboyy)	Wizboyy	3:26
14.	"Chewe Kwem"	M-Jay	3:51
15.	"Carolina"	M-Jay	3:36
16.	"Baby Oku (Dance)"	J Stunt	3:43
17.	"Kwarikwa" (featuring Fally Ipupa)	Masterkraft	3:42
18.	"Beverly"	Masterkraft	1:42

Notes

- "—" denotes a skit

== Release history ==
Country/Digital platform	Date	Version	Format	Label
Nigeria; iTunes	October 18, 2012	Standard	CD; digital download	2nite Entertainment
