= Rex Lawson =

Nigerian highlife musician

- Born: Erekeosima Lawson; 4 March 1938; Buguma, British Nigeria
- Died: 16 January 1971 (aged 32); Asaba-Benin Road, Nigeria
- Other names: Pastor Rex Lawson, Cardinal Rex Lawson
- Spouse: Regina Rex Lawson
- Musical career
- Genre: highlife
- Occupations: Composer, singer
- Instruments: Trumpet and saxophone
- Years active: Late 1950s – Early 1970s

Rex Jim Lawson (4 March 1938 – 16 January 1971), known as Cardinal Rex, was a singer, trumpeter and bandleader from Buguma in present Rivers State, Nigeria. He became one of the best-known highlife musicians of the 1960s in Africa when Cardinal and his band dominated Nigeria's highlife scene.

== Early life ==
Rex Lawson was born in 1938 in Buguma, Nigeria to a Kalabari chieftain father and an Igbo mother from Owerri. He was given the name Erekeosima which translates to "do not name this one" due to his father's belief that he would not live past infancy. He was the fourth child to his parents, the others having died of illnesses. At a young age, Lawson was afflicted with a severe case of small pox. While his mother brought him to various medicine men outside of Kalabari for treatment, his father feared he would die and lost interest in raising him. Lawson later sued his father for neglect while he was at school. He won the case, and his father totally neglected him in return, and the two did not communicate with one another until Lawson began his musical career.

== Musical career ==
Rex Lawson began his career in Port Harcourt as a bandboy for Lord Eddyson's Starlight Melody Orchestra. He later played with Sammy Obot, Bobby Benson, Victor Olaiya, Chris Ajilo, and other Ghanaian and Nigerian musicians and bands. His greatest success came as the leader of the Majors Band (also called the Rivers Men in later years); their recorded hits include "So ala teme", "Yellow Sisi", "Gowon Special", and "Jolly Papa".

By 1965 Lawson had written more than 100 songs. In July 1970 he traveled to the United Kingdom, where from then until September he recorded an album, Rex Lawson in London.

== Style and musical themes ==
A highly emotional and deep musician, Lawson was known to weep and shed tears while singing his own songs on stage, notably the haunting "So ala temen" . The late Nigerian tenor saxophonist who played with Rex Lawson, Bobby Benson and Victor Uwaifo, remembers Lawson as always placing music over money. Lawson is famed for his infectious gregariousness, his musical vision, talent, perseverance and individuality. He was able to sing in many different languages and dialects such as Kalabari, Nembe, Ijaw(Izon), Igbo, Urhobo, Ibibio, Efik and those of Cameroon and Ghana.

In most Highlife bands, the trumpet often played a leading role in the music that they played. Lawson broke from this trend by frequently featuring alto saxophone solos in his songs. He was well known across the Nigeria, where he was crowned the King Of Highlife in Lagos in 1965, After a competion was held, where other top musical bands across the country participated. He also went ahead to record his last album during his London tour in 1979 titled "Rex Jim Lawson: The Highlife King in London." With hits like ' Angelina Pay My Money" and others recorded while on tour.

Rex Lawson and Fela Kuti were close friends in 1960s Lagos who visited each other, ate and drank together, lived nearby, and sometimes shared the same stage. Surviving band members confirm their personal friendship.

Spiffy Lawson, Rex’s grand-nephew, actively carries the family legacy forward through modern Afrobeats and Afrofusion, releasing tributes and remixes of his grand-uncle’s classics such as the 2025 track “Dein Bote"

== Death ==
Lawson died on 16 January 1971 in a car accident at the Urhamigbe corner on the Asaba–Benin Road while on his way to Warri, Nigeria, for a performance. He was 32 years old. After his death, his band continued as the Professional Seagulls. Lawson was married to Chief (Mrs.) Regina Rex Lawson who died in October 2008.

== Discography ==
Albums

- Abari Biya (as Rex Lawson)
- Bere Bote (as Cardinal Rex Jim Lawson)
- Owuna Derina (as Cardinal Rex Jim Lawson)
- Nume Inye (as Cardinal Rex Jim Lawson)

Contributing artist

- The Rough Guide to Highlife (2003, World Music Network)

== Legacy ==
His music is loved to this day in Nigeria. His songs are regularly performed and danced at live band shows in Nigeria, and a number of young musicians have remixed some of his old hits, and his relevance continues to be felt. His most popular songs were "Love Adure" and "Sawale". The single "Sawale" was a hit all over Africa and has been remixed in various Africa countries like Ethiopia.

His single "Sawale" was remixed by Flavour N'abania to make the popular hit song, "Nwa Baby (Ashawo)".

In honor of his musical achievements, the Rivers State Government named a street after Lawson in the neighborhood of Borokiri in Port Harcourt.

On Saturday, June 2018 Rivers State Governor Ezenwo Nyesom Wike and Ooni of Ife Adeyeye Enitan Ogunwusi commissioned the Rex Lawson Cultural Center in Port Harcourt.

== Documentary ==
In 2018, Beautiful Nubia, Nigeria's foremost contemporary folk and roots musician, released on YouTube, a documentary - "Unworthy of a Name" - detailing Rex Lawson's life and times.
