= Chidinma =

Nigerian singer (born 1991)

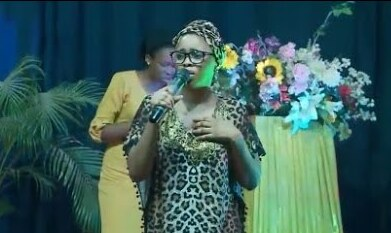

Background information
- Born: Chidinma Ekile; 2 May 1991 (age 35); Ketu, Kosofe, Lagos State
- Origin: Ikorodu, Lagos State
- Genres: Gospel; afropop
- Occupations: Singer; songwriter; actress
- Years active: 2011–present
- Label: Capital Hill (former)

Chidinma Ekile (born 2 May 1991), known mononymously as Chidinma, is a Nigerian singer, songwriter, and actress. A native of Imo State, Chidinma was born in Ketu, Kosofe, Lagos State. In 2010, she gained prominence after winning the third season of Project Fame West Africa. Chidinma became the first female musician to sit atop the MTV Base Official Naija Top 10 chart after her single "Emi Ni Baller" reached number one. In 2011, she released the Sound Sultan-assisted single "Jankoliko". Her eponymous debut album, Chidinma, which was released via the music platform Spinlet, yielded the singles "Jankoliko", "Carry You Go", "Kedike" and "Run Dia Mouth". Chidinma won Best Female West African Act at the 2012 Kora Awards and performed "Kedike" at the ceremony.

In May 2021, Chidinma revealed on Instagram that she made a transition to gospel music and is now engage in Christian ministry. She released the gospel single "Jehovah Overdo" that same month. Her debut extended play (EP), New Season, was released on 20 August 2021. Eezee Tee produced the entire EP, which is composed of seven tracks and was inspired by the Holy Spirit. Chidinma's second studio album, Psalm 16, was released on 14 October 2022. The album has eight tracks and features collaborations with KS Bloom, Indira, and Buchi. Her third studio album, The Road Best Travelled, was released on 7 March 2025.

== Career ==
=== 1991–2010: Early life, educational pursuits, Project Fame, and public image ===
A native of Imo State, Chidinma Ekile was born on 2 May 1991, in Ketu, Kosofe, Lagos State. She is the sixth-born child of her parents and has six other siblings. Chidinma grew up with a disciplinarian father and began singing at six. When she was 10 years old, she joined the choir at her church. Chidinma attended primary and secondary school in Ketu before relocating to Ikorodu with her family. She worked as a business promoter in Lagos prior to auditioning for the third season of Project Fame West Africa. She wanted to study mass communication but attained a sociology degree from the University of Lagos. Chidinma initially declined her admission to the University of Lagos due to her advancement in Project Fame West Africa. In an interview with YNaija, she said she has always taken school seriously and that her decision to enroll at Unilag was inevitable. She also said music wasn't always on her agenda, but decided to give it a try after winning Project Fame. After dying her hair red and getting a mohawk, people started perceiving her as a good girl gone bad. In an interview with the Daily Independent, she said she is still the same person and is evolving and growing as a musician.

Prior to auditioning for the third edition of Project Fame West Africa, Chidinma dreamt of being part of the reality television show. With the help and support from a close-knit friend, she left her home in Ikorodu and went to Ultima Studios. Chidinma joined 17 other contestants in the Fame Academy round after being one of 8,000 talent showcasers that year. For ten weeks, she and the other contestants were coached by voice coaches, inspirational speakers, established musicians, and music business service providers. Moreover, contestants were taught choreography and several rehearsal drills. Chidinma was announced as the competition's winner on 26 September 2010. She won a number of prizes, including ₦2.5 million, a 2011 Toyota RAV4, and a production deal.

=== 2011–2019:Chidinma, standalone releases, and acting debut ===
Chidinma started working on her eponymous debut studio album, Chidinma, after releasing a collaborative project with other season three finalists. The album was scheduled for release in the fourth quarter of 2011. Chidinma spoke about the album briefly and said she put a lot of energy into it. She worked with a number of producers, including Cobhams Asuquo, Tee-Y Mix, WazBeat and Oscar Heman Ackah. On 22 February 2011, she released the Sound Sultan-assisted single "Jankoliko" and "Carry You Go" as the album's first two singles. Both songs were written and produced by Oscar Heman Ackah. In an interview with the Weekly Trust, Chidinma said she was pleased with the positive response she received after releasing both songs, and is working hard to improve her craft. On 4 June 2011, Chidinma released the Clarence Peters-directed music video for "Jankoliko". She performed with Dr SID at the MTN Power of 10 Concerts, a ten-city tour that celebrated MTN Nigeria's ten-year anniversary. On 11 October 2011, Chidinma released "Kedike" and "Run Dia Mouth" as the album's third and fourth singles. "Kedike" translates to "Heartbeat" and was produced by Cobhams Asuquo. In an interview with Entertainment Rave, Chidinma said the song depicts love and revealed that she and the producer created its name.

Chidinma won Best Female West African Act at the 2012 Kora Awards. Her award plaque was presented to her by Didier Drogba. In an interview with newspaper This Day, she said, "It was a huge honour to me. I'm grateful to God, my fans and people, who have been part of my success story. Winning Kora is a big achievement for me and I know it is the beginning of better things to come." The Clarance Peters-directed music video for "Kedike" was released on 24 January 2012. Nigerian singer Dammy Krane played the singer's love interest in the video. On 14 September, Chidinma released the Legendury Beatz-produced single "Emi Ni Baller", which includes rap verses by Illbliss and Tha Suspect. The song peaked at number 7 on Vanguard's list of the Top 10 songs that made 2013. The remix of "Emi Ni Baller" features vocals by Wizkid and was released on 22 February 2013. Three months later, Chidinma signed an endorsement deal with MTN Nigeria. On 10 June 2013, she released the singles "Bless My Hustle", "Kite" and "Jolly"; all three songs were produced by Tha Suspect, Del B and Wizzboy, respectively. That same month, Capital Dreams Pictures released the music video for "Emi Ni Baller", which was directed by Clarence Peters. Chidinma was one of the supporting acts on the 2013 Hennessy Artistry Club Tour, which D'banj headlined.

Chidinma released the Young D-produced track "Oh Baby" on 14 September 2013. The remix, titled "Oh Baby (You & I)", features vocals by Flavour N'abania and was released in January of the following year. On 3 November 2013, Chidinma performed at the Guinness World of More Concert with P-Square, D'banj, Wizkid, Ice Prince, Burna Boy, Olamide, Phyno, Waje, Davido and Tiwa Savage. Six days later, she shared the stage with Blackstreet at the Butterscotch Evening Experience, a concert that was held at the Eko Hotels and Suites. On 14 February 2014, she performed at the Valentine Rave Party, which featured additional performances from Tiwa Savage, Sound Sultan, and Mario. Three months later, Chidinma released the music video for "Oh Baby (You & I)", which was directed by Clarence Peters and stars Ngozi Nwosu and OC Ukeje. On 7 November 2016, she released the single "Fallen in Love", which was produced by Masterkraft and mastered by Simi. The accompanying music video for the song was filmed in Soweto by Godfather Productions.

Chidinma made her acting debut in Kunle Afolayan's 2017 film The Bridge. She played the role of Stella, an Igbo lady whose personal relationship is threatened by tribal prejudice and parental plans. In April 2019, the feminine hygiene brand Molped appointed her as its first ever brand ambassador and social media influencer in Nigeria.

=== 2021–present: Gospel music transition, New Season, Psalm 16, and The Road Best Travelled ===
On 2 May 2021, Chidinma released her first gospel single "Jehovah Overdo", along with its music video. The track was produced by Eezee Tee and labeled "a mellow groovy song of praise". The accompanying music video for the song was directed by Avalon Okpe. Two days after releasing "Jehovah Overdo", Chidinma revealed on Instagram that she made a transition to gospel music and is now engage in Christian ministry. During her ministration at Enthronement Assembly, she said she decided to turn a new leaf because she believes that it is "time to work for my father. He is the one who has called me I did not bring myself here".

Chidinma's debut extended play (EP), New Season, was released on 20 August 2021. Inspired by the Holy Spirit, the EP was produced by Eezee Tee and comprises seven tracks, including a bonus track performed entirely in French. A day before New Season's release, she and the gospel band The Gratitude shared the official video for the song "Jesus the Son of God". Chidinma's second studio album, Psalm 16, was released on 14 October 2022. Composed of eight tracks, the album features collaborations with KS Bloom, Indira, and Buchi. Chidinma's third studio album, The Road Best Travelled, was released on 7 March 2025.

== Musical influences ==
Chidinma has cited Michael Jackson, Bob Marley, Alicia Keys, Whitney Houston, Mariah Carey, Fela Kuti, Omawumi, Onyeka Onwenu, Lagbaja, and Darey Art Alade as her biggest musical influences.

== Personal life ==
In an interview with Guardian Life, Chidinma said she was born blind and couldn't see for a few months. She founded the NMA Foundation to help visually impaired children and young people across Africa. The foundation's name was derived from the last three letters of her name.

== Discography ==
Studio albums

- Chidinma (2012)
- Psalm 16 (2022)
- The Road Best Travelled (2025)

EPs

- 40yrs Everlasting (with Flavour) (2019)
- New Season (2021)

== Awards and nominations ==
Year	Event	Prize	Recipient	Result	Ref
2014	City People Entertainment Awards	Musician of the Year (Female)	Herself	Nominated	
2014	City People Entertainment Awards	Best Collabo of the Year	"Oh! Baby (You & I)" (featuring Flavour N'abania)	Nominated	
2014	2014 Nigeria Entertainment Awards	Best Pop/R&B Artist of the Year	Herself	Nominated	
2014	2014 Nigeria Entertainment Awards	Female Artist of the Year	Herself	Nominated	
2014	2014 Nigeria Entertainment Awards	Best Music Video of the Year (Artist & Director)	"Oh! Baby (You & I)" (featuring Flavour N'abania)	Nominated	
2014	2014 Nigeria Entertainment Awards	Best Collaboration	"Oh! Baby (You & I)" (featuring Flavour N'abania)	Nominated	
2014	African Muzik Magazine Awards	Best Female West Africa	Herself	Nominated	
2014	MTV Africa Music Awards 2014	Best Female	Herself	Nominated	
2013	The Headies	Best Collabo	"Emi Ni Baller" (featuring Tha Suspect and IllBliss)	Nominated	
2013	Nigeria Music Video Awards (NMVA)	Video of the Year	"Emi Ni Baller" (featuring Tha Suspect and IllBliss)	Nominated	
2013	Nigeria Music Video Awards (NMVA)	Best Pop Extra Video	"Emi Ni Baller" (featuring Tha Suspect and IllBliss)	Won	
2013	Nigeria Music Video Awards (NMVA)	Best Afro Hip Hop Video	"I Am Sorry" (IllBliss featuring Chidinma)	Nominated	
2013	Channel O Music Video Awards	Most Gifted African West	"Emi Ni Baller" (featuring Tha Suspect and IllBliss)	Nominated	
2013	Nigeria Entertainment Awards	Best Collabo	"Emi Ni Baller" (featuring Tha Suspect and IllBliss)	Nominated	
2013	City People Entertainment Awards	Musician of the Year (Female)	Herself	Nominated	
2012	The Headies	Best Vocal Performance (Female)	"Kedike"	Nominated	
2012	Nigeria Music Video Awards (NMVA)	Best Afro Pop	"Kedike"	Nominated	
2012	Nigeria Music Video Awards (NMVA)	Best Indigenous Concept	"Kedike"	Nominated	
2012	Nigeria Entertainment Awards	Best New Act of the Year	Herself	Nominated	
2012	Nigeria Entertainment Awards	Best Pop/R&B Artist of the Year	Herself	Nominated	
2012	Kora Awards	Best Female West African Act	"Kedike"	Won	

== See also ==
- List of Igbo people
- List of Nigerian musicians
