= Odumeje =

Nigerian clergyman (born 1982)

Chukwuemeka Odùméje
- Born: Chukwuemeka Ohanaemere; September 9, 1982 (age 44); Anambra State, Nigeria
- Other name: Odùméje
- Occupation: Pastor
- Spouse: Uju Ohanaemere née Ogbatuo
- Children: 5

Chukwuemeka Cyril Ohanaemere// (born 9 September 1982), predominantly known as Odùméje, is a Nigerian clergyman as the general overseer of The Mountain of Holy Ghost Intervention and Deliverance Ministry, and a musician.

== Early life ==
Odùméje was born in Anambra State, Nigeria, into a family of six children as the third-born child of Mr and Mrs Pius Ohanaemere.

He grew up hustling to make ends meet He had his secondary school education at Providence Secondary School after his primary education at Nweje. He desired to go further, but he went into a leather business due to financial constraints, where he first served as an apprentice.

== Religious activity ==
Odumeje's claimed methods of healing earned him the title; "The wrestling pastor" Odumeje had a feud with a former female associate, known as Ada Jesus, who accused him of being a false prophet and a charlatan who stage managed miracles. Upon being described as a “money-inclined show maker”, he declared his detractors to be noisemakers.

In March 2022, his church building was identified as one of the houses obstructing drainage channels in Okpoko, Onitsha, and a part of the church was marked for demolition. The Governor of Anambra State, Prof. Charles Chukwuma Soludo had pledged to clear the drainage channels to check flooding in the area. He was manhandled by the government officials that came for the demolition exercise as he tried to stop them from carrying out the operation. However, Governor Soludo reacted to the incident by promising to discipline those who manhandled Odumeje and also warned that the pastor should be ready to bear the cost of demolition since he was given adequate notice before the exercise was carried out.

== Controversy ==
Odumeje has sometimes stoked controversy by his utterances and comic relief. In a Business Day Oped, Odumeje's brand of religious theatrics was described as "religious charlatanism and comic relief". In response to a lot of the criticisms referring to him as a fake prophet, Odumeje says "I am not fake prophet".

In 2023, he was quoted by newspapers as warning Nigerian pastors to "stop praying for Israel or I will make you deaf, dumb" in reference to Israel's war in Gaza. In 2024, he was also quoted to have threatened to kill social media critics. In response to the recent massive depreciation of Nigeria's currency, the Naira, Odumeje said "Naira depreciates because I travelled out of Nigeria".

== Entertainment ==
Odumeje has featured on musical works and has also hosted comedy shows. He is a singer and musician and is said to have started his musical career long before becoming a clergy. Most notably, he released a song with Flavour.

== Personal life ==
Odumeje is married to Uju Ohanaemere.
