= Solidstar =

Nigerian singer (born 1988)

Solid Star

Background information
- Born: Joshua Iniyezo; 8 November 1988 (age 37); Delta State, Nigeria
- Origin: Isoko South, Aviara, Nigeria
- Genres: Afrobeat; R&B
- Occupations: Singer; songwriter
- Years active: 2009–present
- Label: Shaba Entertainment
- Website: achievasng.com

Joshua Iniyezo (born 8 November 1988), better known by his stage name SolidStar Isoko or simply SolidStar, is a Nigerian singer. He began his musical career as a drummer for a local church in his hometown of Delta State. SolidStar is popularly known across Nigeria and Africa for his hit song "One in a Million". He got signed by Ossy Achievas.

In 2010, he released his debut album One in a Million which went on to become a huge hit. The remix of the single "One in a Million" there after featuring Africa's legend 2face Idibia. He has followed up this feat with several hit singles later on down the line.

== Early life ==
SolidStar, who is known for his ability to sing fluently in English, Isoko and Igbo, was born in Delta State, Nigeria, to Mr. and Mrs. Iniyezo. His family originated from Aviara town. SolidStar began his music career at the age of 14 when he started playing the drums for his church choir in Aviara. He was discovered a few years later at a music talent show in Ajegunle area of Lagos State where he was introduced to Paul Cole a record label boss. In 2010, SolidStar formally signs to Achievas Record and his debut album was subsequently released under the label.

== Career ==
In 2010, SolidStar released his debut album One in a Million through Achievas Music. The album was a hit fueled by its lead single "One in a Million", which was a collaboration with 2face Idibia.

== Discography ==
=== Albums ===
- One in a Million (2010)
- Grace$Glory (2013)
- W.E.E.D (2016)

=== Selected singles ===
- "One in a Million" (featuring 2Baba)
- "Silicon" (featuring Timaya)
- "International Woman"
- "Nwa Baby" (featuring 2Baba)
- "Wait (Refix)" (featuring Patoranking and Tiwa Savage)
- "Wait" (featuring Davido)
- "My Body (featuring Timaya)
- "Negotiate"
- "Oluchi" (featuring Flavour)
- "Skibo"
- "Omotena"
- "Yarinya"
- "Ala"

== Videography ==
Year	Title	Director	Ref
2013	SolidStar Ft. Flavour – Oluchi	Aje Films	
2013	SolidStar Ft. Timaya – My Body	Aje Films	
2013	SolidStar Ft. Tiwa Savage – Baby Jollof	Clarence Peters	
2013	SolidStar – In My Head	Clarence Peters	
2013	SolidStar – Good Woman	Clarence Peters	
2013	SolidStar ft Davido – Wait	Avalon Okpe	
2013	SolidStar ft Davido – Wait	Avalon Okpe	
2013	SolidStar ft Davido – Wait	TalkingDrums	

== Awards and nominations ==
Year	Event	Prize	Recipient	Result	Ref
2010	Nigeria Music Video Award (NMVA)	Best new artiste	"One in a Million"	Won	
2015	The Headies 2015	BEST REGGAE/DANCEHALL SINGLE	"My Body – Solid Star Feat. Timaya"	Nominated	
