= Uplifted =

Studio album by Flavour N'abania
- Released: April 4, 2010
- Recorded: 2010
- Genre: Igbo highlife; hip-hop; reggae; R&B; dancehall; calypso
- Length: 58:54
- Label: Obaino Music; 2nite Entertainment
- Producer: Flavour; Jaystuntz; MJ; Wizboyy; Lord Cornel; Goodies

Flavour N'abania chronology
N'abania (2008)	Uplifted (2010)	Blessed (2012)

Singles from Uplifted
- 1. "Oyi (I Dey Catch Cold)" Released: 18 April 2010; 2. "Adamma" Released: 20 May 2010; 3. "Nwa Baby (Ashawo Remix)" Released: 1 April 2011; 4. "Odiro Easy" Released: 4 August 2011

Uplifted is the second studio album by Nigerian singer Flavour N'abania. It was released on April 4, 2010, by Obaino Music and 2nite Entertainment. The album features guest appearances from Jah Dey, Oloye, Stormrex, Waga Gee, Asem, Stone, M-Jay, V.I.P and Elense. Uplifted was supported by the singles "Oyi (I Dey Catch Cold)", "Adamma", "Nwa Baby" (Ashawo Remix), and "Odiro Easy".

== Background ==
Flavour started recording the album after releasing his debut studio album, N'abania (2005). He produced three songs on the album; "Oyi (I Dey Catch Cold)", "Chinedum", and the techno-infused track "Kiumanjo". Uplifted explores the genres of highlife, hip-hop, reggae, dancehall, calypso and R&B. The album was recorded in Igbo, English and Nigerian pidgin. While recording Uplifted, Flavour believed it would break national and cultural barriers that often diminish the value of music in Africa. The album was well received in Nigeria, South Africa and Botswana.

== Singles ==
The album's lead single "Oyi (I Dey Catch Cold)" was released on April 18, 2010. Its music video was directed by Bobby Hai. The dance track "Adamma" was released on May 20, 2010, as the album's second single. There were two music videos released for "Adamma". The second video was shot in South Africa by Godfather Productions and uploaded to YouTube on October 6, 2011. "Nwa Baby (Ashawo Remix)" was released on April 1, 2011, as the album's third single. The song was written by Flavour and is a remake of Cardinal Rex's 1960 hit "Sawale".

== Critical reception ==
In a review for ModernGhana, Onyinye Muomah said the artists featured on the album were subpar, but positively acknowledged Flavour for "incorporating new genres to his original kind of music".

== Track listing ==
No.	Title	Length
1.	"Oyi (I Dey Catch Cold)"	2:45
2.	"Adamma"	3:22
3.	"Skit"	0:11
4.	"Nwa Baby (Ashawo Remix)"	4:22
5.	"Pant No N'iro"	3:53
6.	"Skit 2"	0:32
7.	"Achohol" (featuring Oloye)	4:24
8.	"My Woman Is Gone" (featuring Jah Dey)	5:00
9.	"Ukwu" (featuring Stormrex)	3:45
10.	"Kwarikwa" (featuring M-Jay, Waga G, Jah Dey and Elense)	4:18
11.	"Odiro Easy"	4:15
12.	"Chinedum"	3:53
13.	"Asanwa" (featuring Waga G)	3:34
14.	"Turn Me On"	4:10
15.	"Kiumanjo"	4:07
16.	"My Baby" (with V.I.P)	4:25
17.	"Ashawo (Ghana Remix)" (featuring Asem and Stone)	4:38

== Personnel ==
- Chinedu Okoli – primary artist
- Jah Dey – featured artist
- Oloye – featured artist
- Stormrex – featured artist
- Waga G – featured artist
- Asem
- Stone – featured artist
- M-Jay – featured artist
- V.I.P. – featured artist
- Elense – featured artist

== Release history ==
Region	Date	Version	Format	Label
Various	April 4, 2010	Standard	CD	Obaino Music; 2nite Entertainment
Various	July 20, 2010	Standard	Digital download	Obaino Music; 2nite Entertainment
