= Mr Raw =

Nigerian rapper

- Also known as: Raw
- Born: Okechukwu Edwards Ukeje; 1 November 1974 (age 51); Enugu, Nigeria
- Genres: Igbo rap
- Occupations: Rapper; songwriter
- Years active: 2001–present
- Label: Raw Deal

Okechukwu Edwards Ukeje (born 1 November 1974) better known as Mr Raw (formerly Dat Nigga Raw), is a Nigerian rapper and songwriter. Born and raised in Enugu, and a native of Abia State, he is a pioneer of Igbo rap.

== Early life ==
Born and raised in Enugu, he gained prominence during the early 2000s rapping in the Igbo language and Pidgin English.

== Career ==
Raw's debut studio album, Right & Wrong, was released on 7 August 2005. A second album Everything Remains Raw followed in 2007. His third studio album End of Discussion was released in October 2010. The album yielded the hit song "O! Chukwu" whose music video won Best Afro Hip Hop Video at the NMVA Awards that year.

In 2010, Raw announced that he would change his name from "Dat Nigga Raw" (an acronym of "Dat Nigerian Guy Anakpo Raw" which means "that Nigerian guy called Raw") to "Mr. Raw", stating that the negative connotations associated to the word "nigga" resulted in his name being censored abroad and prevented people from purchasing his music online.

Raw has collaborated with numerous other musical artists including Flavour N'abania, Duncan Mighty, Phyno, Illbliss, 2Face, M-Josh, Hype MC, BosaLin and Slowdog.

== Personal life ==
Ukeje is married, but has cited that he prefers to keep his family life private. In August 2021, he and his driver were hospitalised due to a car accident.

== Discography ==
=== Studio albums ===
- Right and Wrung (2005)
- Everything Remains Raw (2007)
- End of Discussion (2010)
- The Greatest (2012)
