= Del B =

- Born: Ayodele Joseph Basil; Kano, Nigeria
- Origin: Delta/Edo, Nigeria
- Genres: Afropop; hip-hop; Afrobeats; R&B
- Occupations: Composer, singer, songwriter, record producer, sound engineer
- Instruments: guitar, keyboard, percussions
- Years active: 2008–present
- Label: none

Ayodele Joseph Basil, better known as Del B, is a Nigerian composer, sound engineer, record producer. and songwriter. He is best known for producing Kcee's hit single "Limpopo", which went on to be voted Song of The Year at the 2013 edition of The Headies. In 2012, he produced the single "Shake" by Flavour N'abania, which received critical acclaim among music critics.

== Early life and career ==
Del B was born in Kano State, Nigeria, to parents who are natives of Kwale. Prior to achieving recognition, he worked as a studio engineer at MidiCorp Studios. While there, he produced D'banj's "Why Me" single. He recorded the chart-topping single by Kcee entitled "Limpopo"—the song that got him nominated at the 2013 Headies. He produced two songs: "Kind Love" and "On Top Your Matter" off Wizkid's critically acclaimed studio album, Ayo. "On Top Your Matter" was met with positive reviews among music critics. It debuted at number nine on the MTV Base Official Naija Top 10 music video chart. It subsequently went on to top the charts for several weeks, earning Del B more recognition.

Del B has been credited as producer on studio albums including Seyi or Shay by Seyi Shay; Testify by Harrysong; Ghetto University by Runtown; Take Over by Kcee; The Baddest by Davido; Blessed and Thankful by Flavour N'abania; and Ayo by Wizkid. Del B showed his versatility as a singer and producer after he released a single titled "Too Proud" in 2012 and went on to be featured on a song titled "So Nice", by DJ Neptune, in 2015.

== Net worth ==
Ayodele Joseph Basil is estimated to have a net worth of about $650,000..

== Production style ==
Micheal Abimboye of Premium Times describes Del B's style of production as a kind of production that “allows the artiste to actually use their pipes and show-off their vocal abilities”.

== Awards and nominations ==
Year	Event	Prize	Recipient	Result
2013	The Headies 2013	Producer of The Year	Del B for "Limpopo"	Nominated
2014	2014 Nigeria Entertainment Awards	Producer of The Year	Himself	Won
2014	City People Entertainment Awards	Producer of The Year	Himself	Nominated
