= Zoro (musician) =

Nigerian musician

- Also known as: Zoro Swagbag
- Born: Owoh Chimaobi Chrismathner; 20 March 1990 (age 36); Onitsha, Anambra State, Nigeria
- Origin: Agwu, Enugu State
- Genres: Afropop; hip hop
- Occupations: Rapper; singer
- Years active: 2012–present
- Label: Penthauze Music

Owoh Chimaobi Chrismathner (born 20 March 1990), known professionally as Zoro or Zoro Swagbag, is a Nigerian rapper and singer.

== Early life and music career ==
A native of Agwu, Enugu State, Owoh Chimaobi Chrismathner was born and raised in Onitsha, in a family of six children (five boys and a girl. He grew up in a humble one-room apartment in a bustling ghetto. His mother, a hardworking entrepreneur, ran a small restaurant, while his father was a skilled butcher.

As a young boy, his aspirations were far removed from the world of music. Instead, he dreamed of getting a quality education, securing a stable job, and raising his family's living standards. His ultimate goal was to move his parents from the cramped apartment to a comfortable flat, freeing them from the hardships of their current reality.

He attended St. Mary's Primary School, Onitsha, and topped his class in the Common Entrance Examination. He then proceeded to College Of Immaculate Conception(CIC)Enugu, for his secondary education. Following his secondary education, he pursued higher learning at the Institute of Management and Technology (IMT), Enugu, where he earned an Ordinary National Diploma (OND) in Public Administration. He subsequently gained admission to Nnamdi Azikiwe University (UNIZIK) to further his studies. However, his just begun music career intervened, and he relocated to Lagos in 2014.

His music career took off in 2016 with his hit single "Ogene".

== Discography ==
Singles
Song title	Year
Otu (Onitsha State of Mind)	2014
Coal City Chic (feat. Latino)	2015
Nekede	2015
Akpobi	2015
Ogene (feat. Flavour)	2016
Ogene Remix	2016
Achikolo	2016
Inna Di Ghetto	2017
Bianca (Ojukwu)	2017
Landlady	2017
Echolac (Bag of Blessings)	2017
Christmas Freestyle	2017
Oyoko	2018
Mbada	2018
Stainless	2018
One on One	2018
Upandan	2018
Halleluyah	2018
Iheanacho	2019
Nwunyem	2019
Zoro to Hero	2019
Giddem	2019
Kulture	2020
Prick Power	2020
Two	2020
Church	2020
Ayo'm	2020
African Girl Bad	2021
DTTM (Oneme)	2021
Waka Waka	2021
New Video	2022
Winner	2022
Naira to Pounds	2022
Show More Love	2023
Gangan	2024
EGOWO	2024
Storm	2024
Diamond (feat. Peruzzi)	2024
Double Tap	2024

Albums
Title	Year
Sound Check	2023

== Awards and nominations ==
Year	Award ceremony	Award description	Result	Ref
2016	Nigeria Music Video Awards	Best indigenous concept in a visual	Won	
2017	City People Entertainment Awards	Revelation of the Year	Nominated	
2017	All Africa Music Awards	Group in African Traditional	Nominated	
2018	All Africa Music Awards	Best Rap Act	Nominated	
2018	The Headies	Next Rated	Nominated	
