= Flavour (musician) =

Nigerian singer (born 1983)

Flavour N'abania
- Flavour performing at the 2014 Africa Magic Viewers Choice Awards

Background information
- Also known as: Ijele, Mr. Flavour; Palliative Ụmụ Ashawo
- Born: Chinedu Izuchukwu Okoli; 23 November 1983 (age 42); Enugu, Enugu State, Nigeria
- Genres: Igbo highlife; gospel
- Occupations: Singer; songwriter
- Years active: 2005–present
- Label: 2nite Music Group
- Website: Official website

Chinedu Okoli (born 23 November 1983), better known by his stage name Flavour N'abania or simply Flavour, is a Nigerian singer and songwriter. He began his musical career as a drummer for a local church. His popular releases include "Nwa Baby (Ashawo Remix)", "Ada Ada" and "Time to Party." He is currently signed to 2nite Entertainment.

In 2008, he released his self-titled debut album N'abania. In 2010, Flavour released his second studio album, Uplifted. It was supported by the singles "Nwa Baby (Ashawo Remix)", "Adamma", and "Oyi Remix". The album's success made Flavour one of Africa's most sought out artists. He was booked to perform at numerous concerts and social events following Uplifted's release.

== Life and career ==
=== Early life and career beginnings ===
Flavour, who sings fluently in the Igbo language, was born in Enugu State, Nigeria. His family is originally from Umunze, a place in Orumba South, Anambra State. Flavour began his music career at the age of 13 when he started playing the drums for his church choir in Enugu, in Enugu State. The resident pastor at his church introduced him to a friend, Chris I. Ordor, the CEO of Soundcity Communications. In 1996, Flavour was invited to join the company on an educational scholarship to study music. After three years of playing the drums, he started playing the keyboard. He also used to provide back-up vocals for other musicians at SoundCity.

At age 19, Flavour emerged into Nigeria's musical scene as a drummer and pianist for a local band in Enugu. After learning to play drums professionally, Flavour received an offer to perform at City Centre, Enugu. The massive crowd there inspired him to gain new grounds and reach great heights. Flavour's educational background in music enabled him to learn music production from Dekumzy, Isi Charles and Nnachie.

=== 2008–2012: N'abania, Uplifted, and Blessed ===
In 2008, Flavour released his debut album N'abania through Obaino Music. The album's success was relative and limited to Eastern Nigeria, particularly Enugu State. Flavour collaborated with Mr Raw on the album's lead single titled "N'abania". The song was recorded at Kingsley Ogoro's music studio in Lagos, Nigeria. Following the relative success of his debut album, Flavour released Uplifted in 2010. The album broke national barriers. Lolhiphop Records, an established record label in South Africa, released the album after popular demand. The album's top singles include "Nwa Baby (Ashawo Remix)", "Adamma", and Oyi Remix" (featuring Tiwa Savage).

Flavour's third album, Blessed, was released on 18 October 2012 through 2nite Entertainment and iROKING LTD. The album is the successor to Uplifted. It is arguably Flavour's biggest album to date due to the number of producers who worked on it. It was launched on the same day of Flavour's 2nite Club grand opening. In an interview with iROKOTV, Flavour said: "I think I'm growing. This is my third album... Now it's time to give them the music, like define myself. I have to be more mature with my music, lyrics and instrumentation wise. I worked with tons of producers and the whole production process made sense."

=== 2014–2020: Thankful, Ijele – The Traveler, and Flavour of Africa ===
His fourth full-length album, Thankful, was released in December 2014. The album consists of 22 tracks and runs for one hour seventeen minutes. Receiving generally positive reviews from music critics, it sold thousands of copies. The album features hit tracks such as the love ballad "Ololufe" featuring Chidinma and the fast-tempo Afro-pop song "Wake Up" feat. Wande Coal.

Ijele – The Traveller was released in 2017. The album contains 17 tracks, including one featuring Flavour's adopted son Semah G Weifur, a blind Liberian child who was spotted singing alone in a classroom. On December 4, 2020, Flavour released his seventh studio album, titled Flavour of Africa, which has 16 tracks.

=== 2021–2023: Miscellaneous Singles and African Royalty ===
In 2021 and 2022, he released two non-album singles, "Levels" and "My Sweetie," respectively. Produced by Masterkraft, "My Sweetie" contains an interpolation of Bunny Mack's, 1981 afro-disco hit, "Let Me Love You".

On December 2, 2022, he debuted the single, "Game Changer (Dike)," which would later appear on his seventh full-length effort, African Royalty. He would drop the LP's lead single, "Big Baller," on November 22, 2023, and its accompanying visuals on January 26, 2024. African Royalty was unveiled on December 1, 2023, with guest appearances from The Cavemen., Ejyk Nwamba, and Efya. It was supported by a European tour, including a stop at the OVO Wembley Arena.

=== 2024–present: Flavour Experience (Love Songs) Vol.1 and Afroculture ===
Following the rollout of African Royalty, Flavour released, Flavour Experience (Love Songs) Vol 1., acoustic re-recordings of his popular ballads on July 19, 2024.

In October 2025, Flavour began teasing a collaboration with Senegalese singer, Baaba Maal. The song, "Afroculture" and its video was made available on October 29, instigating a new album cycle. The Afroculture album was later announced on Flavour's Instagram and officially disseminated on November 28, 2025. Featuring Waga G, Qing Madi, Pheelz, Kizz Daniel, Azzy, and Odumeje, Afroculture was met with critical acclaim. Yinoluwa Olowofoyeku of Afrocritik, described it as "a highly enjoyable, strongly repeatable, energetic, charismatic, culturally rich, sonically diverse, and technically assured body of work."

== Controversy ==
On 29 August 2012, Nigerian Entertainment Today reported that Flavour was involved in a legal battle with Ghanaian duo Wutah, over the alleged theft of "Kwarikwa". According to the article, "Kwarikwa" is an exact replica of "Kotosa", a song made by the aforementioned duo. The singing duo accused Flavour of stealing their song's rhythm, chorus, and tempo.

== Discography ==
Studio albums

- N'abania (2008)
- Uplifted (2010)
- Blessed (2012)
- Thankful (2014)
- Ijele the Traveler (2017)
- Flavour of Africa (2020)
- African Royalty (2023)
- Afroculture (2025)

== Videography ==
Year	Title	Album	Director	Ref.
2011	"Adamma"	Uplifted	Godfather Productions	
2012	"Oyi Remix" featuring Tiwa Savage	Uplifted	Godfather Productions	
2012	"Kwarikwa" featuring Fally Ipupa	Blessed	Masterkraft	
2012	"Baby Oku"	Blessed	Selebobo	
2012	"Shake"	Blessed	Godfather Productions	
2013	"Chinny Baby"	Blessed	Masterkraft	
2013	"Ada Ada"	Blessed	Clarence Peters	
2014	"Ikwokrikwo"	Blessed	Masterkraft	
2014	"Black is Beautiful"	Blessed	Clarence Peters	
2014	"Wake up" featuring Wande Coal	Thankful	Clarence Peters	
2014	"Golibe"	Thankful	Clarence Peters	
2015	"Ololufe" featuring Chidinma	Thankful	Godfather Productions	
2015	"Sexy Rosey" featuring P-Square	Thankful	Godfather Productions	
2016	"Champion"	—N/a	Godfather Productions	
2016	"Dance"	Thankful	Clarence Peters	
2018	"Crazy Love" featuring Yemi Alade		Patrick Elis	
2018	"Awele" featuring Umu Obiligbo	—N/a	Selebobo	
2021	Levels		Patrick Ellis	

== Awards and nominations ==
Year	Event	Prize	Recipient	Result	Ref
2025	The Headies	Afrobeats Single of the Year	"Big Baller"	Won	
2023	All Africa Music Awards	Best Artiste/Duo/Group in African Traditional	"Levels"	Nominated	
2023	The Headies	Best Alternative Song	"Game Changer (Dike)"	Nominated	
2022	The Headies	Best Alternative Song	"Doings" (featuring Phyno)	Won	
2022	The Headies	Song of the Year	"Doings" (featuring Phyno)	Nominated	
2021	All Africa Music Awards	Best Artiste, Duo or Group in African Dance or Choreography	"Berna Reloaded" (featuring Fally Ipupa and Diamond Platnumz)	Won	
2021	All Africa Music Awards	Best African Video	"Berna Reloaded" (featuring Fally Ipupa and Diamond Platnumz)	Nominated	
2019	African Muzik Magazine Awards	Best Live Act	Himself	Nominated	
2019	African Muzik Magazine Awards	Best Collaboration	"Awele" (featuring Umu Obiligbo)	Nominated	
2019	African Muzik Magazine Awards	Video of The Year	"Awele" (featuring Umu Obiligbo)	Nominated	
2018	African Muzik Magazine Awards	Artist of the Year	Himself	Nominated	
2018	African Muzik Magazine Awards	Best Live Act	Himself	Won	
2018	The Headies	Best R&B/Pop Album	Ijele the Traveler	Nominated	
2018	The Headies	Album of the Year	Ijele the Traveler	Nominated	
2018	The Headies	Best Performer	Himself	Nominated	
2016	The Headies	Special Recognition	Himself	Honored	
2016	The Headies	Best Pop Single	"M.O.N.E.Y" (Timaya featuring Flavour N'abania)	Nominated	
2016	The Headies	Best Collabo	"M.O.N.E.Y" (Timaya featuring Flavour N'abania)	Nominated	
2016	MTV Africa Music Awards	Best Live Act	Himself	Nominated	
2016	Nigeria Entertainment Awards	Indigenous Artist of the Year	Himself	Won	
2016	Nigeria Entertainment Awards	Collaboration of the Year	"Finally" (Masterkraft featuring Flavour N'abania and Sarkodie)	Nominated	
2015	tooXclusive Awards	Best R&B Track	"Ololufe" (featuring Chidinma)	Nominated	
2015	COSON Song Awards	Best Collabo Song	"Wake Up" (featuring Wande Coal)	Nominated	
2015	COSON Song Awards	Best Collabo Song	"Oh! Baby (You & I)" (Chidinma featuring Flavour N'abania)	Nominated	
2015	MTV Africa Music Awards	Best Live	Himself	Nominated	
2015	African Muzik Magazine Awards	Best Male - West Africa	Himself	Nominated	
2015	African Muzik Magazine Awards	Best Dance in a Video	"Nana" (Diamond Platnumz featuring Flavour)	Nominated	
2015	African Muzik Magazine Awards	Best Traditional Artist	Himself	Won	
2015	African Muzik Magazine Awards	Video of the Year	"Nana" (Diamond Platnumz featuring Flavour)	Won	
2015	African Muzik Magazine Awards	Video of the Year	"Golibe"	Nominated	
2015	African Muzik Magazine Awards	Best Collaboration	"Nana" (Diamond Platnumz featuring Flavour)	Nominated	
2015	African Muzik Magazine Awards	Artist of the Year	Himself	Nominated	
2015	All Africa Music Awards	Best Male Artist in Western Africa	Flavour for "Golibe"	Nominated	
2015	All Africa Music Awards	Best Artist in African Electro	Flavour for "Power to Win"	Won	
2015	All Africa Music Awards	Album of the Year	Thankful	Nominated	
2015	All Africa Music Awards	Artist of the Year	Flavour for "Golibe"	Nominated	
2015	Nigerian Music Video Awards	Best Highlife Video	"Sexy Rosey" (featuring P-Square)	Nominated	
2015	Nigeria Entertainment Awards	Indigenous Artist of the Year	Himself	Nominated	
2015	Nigeria Entertainment Awards	Male Artist of the Year	Himself	Nominated	
2015	Nigeria Entertainment Awards	Album of the Year	Thankful	Won	
2014	All Africa Music Awards	Best Male Artiste in West Africa	Flavour for "Ada Ada"	Nominated	
2014	The Headies	Best Music Video	"Ada Ada"	Won	
2014	The Headies	Artiste of the Year	Himself	Nominated	
2014	Channel O Music Video Awards	Most Gifted Afro Pop Video	"Ada Ada"	Nominated	
2014	Nigeria Entertainment Awards	Indigenous Artist of the Year	Himself	Nominated	
2014	Nigeria Entertainment Awards	Best Album of the Year	Blessed	Nominated	
2014	Nigeria Entertainment Awards	Best Music Video of the Year (Artist & Director)	"Oh! Baby (You & I)" (Chidinma featuring Flavour N'abania)	Nominated	
2014	Nigeria Entertainment Awards	Best Collaboration	"Oh! Baby (You & I)" (Chidinma featuring Flavour N'abania)	Nominated	
2014	African Muzik Magazine Awards	Best Male West Africa	Himself	Nominated	
2014	African Muzik Magazine Awards	Best Traditional Artist	Himself	Won	
2014	African Muzik Magazine Awards	Best Video of the Year	"Ada Ada"	Won	
2014	City People Entertainment Awards	Musician of the Year (Male)	Himself	Nominated	
2014	City People Entertainment Awards	Best Collabo of the Year	"Oh! Baby (You & I)" (Chidinma featuring Flavour N'abania)	Nominated	
2014	City People Entertainment Awards	Video of the Year	"Ada Ada"	Won	
2014	MTV Africa Music Awards	Best Live Act	Himself	Won	
2014	Ghana Music Awards	African Artiste of the Year	Himself	Nominated	
2013	The Headies	Artiste of the Year	Himself	Nominated	
2013	The Headies	Album of the Year	Blessed	Nominated	
2013	The Headies	Best R&B/Pop Album	Blessed	Nominated	
2013	Nigeria Music Video Awards	Video of the Year	"Ada Ada"	Won	
2013	Nigeria Music Video Awards	Best High Life Video	"Ada Ada"	Won	
2013	Nigeria Music Video Awards	Best Indigenous Concept	"Ada Ada"	Won	
2013	Nigeria Music Video Awards	Best Use of Costumes	"Ada Ada"	Won	
2013	Nigeria Entertainment Awards	Best Collabo	"Bottom Belle" (Omawumi featuring Flavour N'abania)	Nominated	
2013	Nigeria Entertainment Awards	Music Video of the Year	"Sisi Eko Remix" (Darey featuring Flavour N'abania)	Nominated	
2013	Nigeria Entertainment Awards	Best Indigenous Artist/Group	Himself	Nominated	
2013	Ghana Music Awards	African Artiste of the Year	Himself	Nominated	
2013	City People Entertainment Awards	Musician of the Year (Male)	Himself	Nominated	
2013	City People Entertainment Awards	Best Collabo of the Year	"Give it to Me" (Kcee featuring Flavour N'abania)	Won	
2012	Nigeria Music Video Awards	Best Highlife Video	"Kwarikwa" (featuring Fally Ipupa)	Nominated	
2012	Channel O Music Video Awards	Best R&B Video	"Oyi Remix" (featuring Tiwa Savage)	Won	
2012	The Headies	Best Collabo	"Orobo" (Sound Sultan featuring Excel and Flavour)	Won	
2012	Nigeria Entertainment Awards	Best Indigenous Artist/Group	Himself	Won	
2011	Channel O Music Video Awards	Most Gifted Afro-Pop Video	"Nwa Baby (Ashawo Remix)"	Nominated	
2011	Channel O Music Video Awards	Most Gifted African West Video	"Nwa Baby (Ashawo Remix)"	Nominated	
2011	The Headies	Best R&B Single	"Oyi Remix" (featuring Tiwa Savage)	Nominated	
2011	The Headies	Best Collabo	"Number One" (M.I featuring Flavour N'abania)	Won	
2011	Nigeria Entertainment Awards	Best High Life Video	"Nwa Baby (Ashawo Remix)"	Nominated	
2010	Ghana Music Awards	African Artiste of the Year	Himself	Nominated	

== See also ==
- List of Nigerian musicians
