= Masterkraft (producer) =

Nigerian record producer

- Born: Sunday Ginikachukwu Nweke; Lagos, Nigeria
- Genres: Highlife; afrobeat; gospel; soul; jazz; R&B; amapiano
- Occupations: Record producer; disc jockey; band director; pianist; songwriter
- Instruments: Piano; vocals

Sunday Ginikachukwu Nweke , known professionally as Masterkraft, is a Nigerian record producer, disc jockey, band director, pianist, and songwriter. He started his professional music career with Kennis Music, and has worked with artists such as Flavour N'abania, Bracket, Banky W., Sound Sultan, Timaya, Lynxxx, M.I and J. Martins, among others. His production hits include "Fine Lady" by Lynxxx (featuring Wizkid), "Kwarikwa (Remix)" by Flavour N'abania (featuring Fally Ipupa), "Girl" by Bracket (featuring Wizkid), "Chinny Baby" by Flavour N'abania, and "Jasi" by Banky W, among others.

Leadership newspaper ranked him 8th on its 2014 list of the Top 10 Music Producers in Nigeria. In August 2015, The NET ranked him 7th on its list of Nigeria's Top 7 Biggest Music Producers at the Moment. Thisday newspaper listed him as one of its Top 10 Music Producers in Nigeria.

== Background ==
A native of Enugu State, Masterkraft was born in Ajegunle, Lagos State. He attended United Christian Secondary School in Apapa, and dreamt of being an accountant.

== Discography ==
Studio albums

- Unlimited (The Tape) (2017)
- Masta Groove (2021)
- Light (2025)

== Accolades ==
Year	Event	Prize	Recipients	Result	Ref
2013	2013 Nigeria Entertainment Awards	Music Producer of the Year	—N/a	Nominated	
2015	The Headies 2015	Producer of the Year	"Wiser"	Nominated	
2015	City People Entertainment Awards	Music Producer of the Year	"Himself"	Won	
2016	Nigeria Entertainment Awards	Music Producer of the Year	"Himself"	Won	
2023	The Beatz Awards	Producer of the Year (Male)	Himself for "Gbese"	Nominated	
2023	The Beatz Awards	Afro Pop Producer of the Year	Himself for "Gbese"	Nominated	
