= Off-Air with Gbemi & Toolz =

Uncensored Talk Show

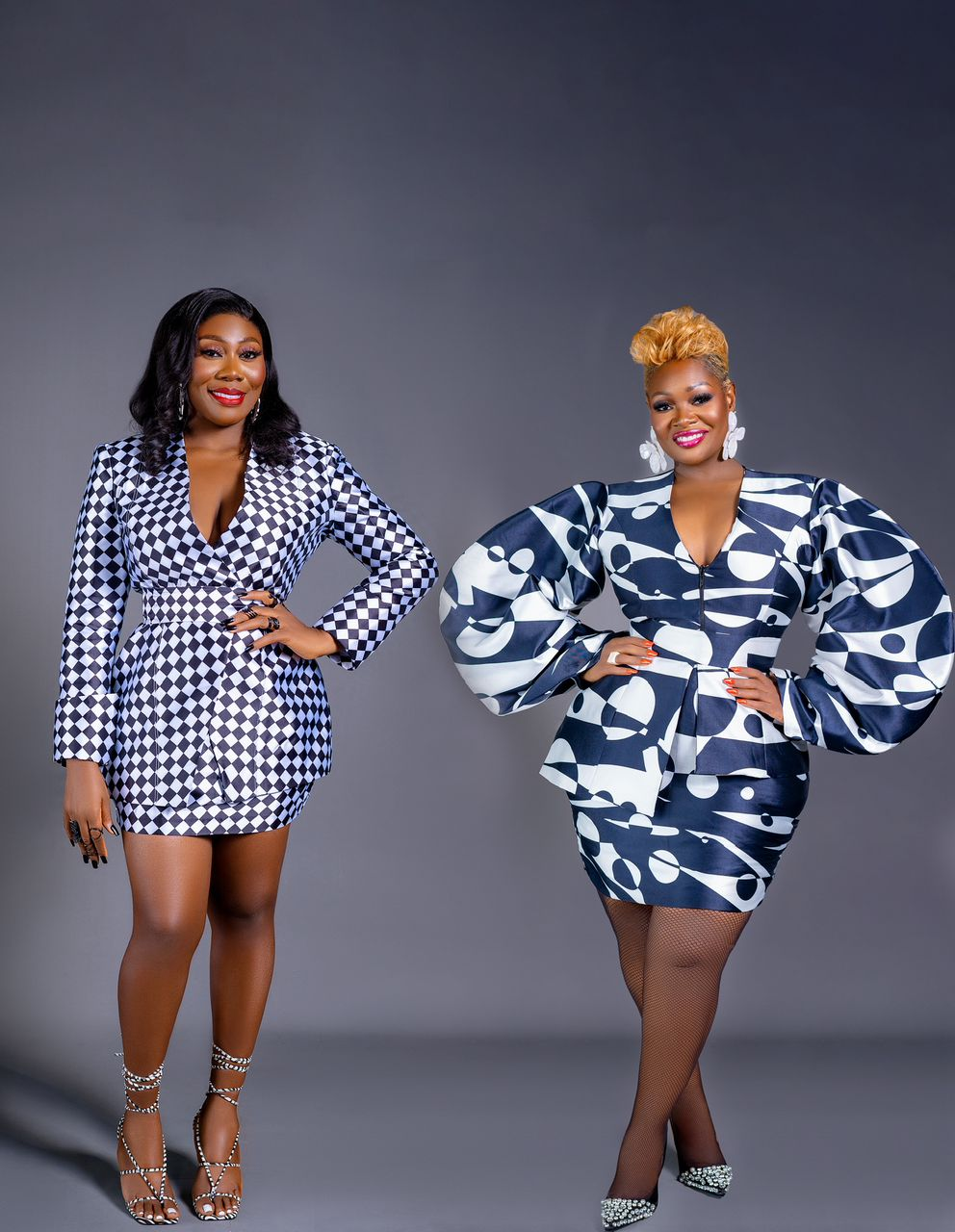
- Genre: Talk show; Gossip
- Created by: Gbemi Olateru-Olagbegi; Tolu "Toolz" Oniru-Demuren
- Presented by: Gbemi Olateru-Olagbegi; Tolu "Toolz" Oniru-Demuren
- Country of origin: Nigeria
- Original language: English
- No. of seasons: 6
- No. of episodes: 72

Production
- Executive producers: Gbemi Olateru-Olagbegi; Tolu "Toolz" Oniru-Demuren
- Running time: 20-80 minutes
- Production companies: LBMedia Africa; Multichoice (2022)

Original release
- Release: October 10, 2019

Off-Air with Gbemi & Toolz is an uncensored gossip and infotainment talk show that was created by Gbemi and Toolz. The talk show was created in response to the duo's daily listeners who had listened to their "Handover session" on The Beat 99.9 FM for over a decade. The talk show series debuted on October 10, 2019, on YouTube and racked up nearly a quarter of a million views, over 25 thousand listeners on the audio podcasts and almost 7,000 subscribers in just three months into the show. For its sixth season, exclusive episodes began to air on DStv, GOtv and Showmax.

== Content ==
Off-Air with Gbemi & Toolz is a talk show with elements of gossip, infotainment, games, celebrity guests, musical performances and human-interest stories. The show often features the contributions of the crew behind the camera.

== Episodes ==
=== Off-Air Specials ===
==== Peas In A Pod ====
After the release of Blood Sisters, a Netflix limited series, Off-Air with Gbemi & Toolz shot an Off-Air special, "Peas In A Pod". Two episodes with two cast members, Nancy Isime and Ini Dima-Okojie of Blood Sisters and their best friends respectively, and one episode with Bimbo Ademoye and Kunle Remi

==== Real Housewives Of Lagos Special ====
Gbemi & Toolz had three cast members of The Real Housewives of Lagos on the fourth episode of the fifth season. Mariam Timmer, Chioma Goodhair and Iyabo Ojo were guests on this special episode as other cast members were unavoidably absent.

=== Season 1 ===
No.	Title	Original release date	Guest(s)
1	"Episode 1 - Welcome"	October 10, 2019	--
Gbemi and Toolz have officially launched their own show.
2	"Episode 2 - Kayamata"	October 17, 2019	--
Gbemi and Toolz talked about herbs or potions that act as sex or love enhancers and spoke to an instagram vendor over the phone.
3	"Episode 3 - Bad Pastor Wilson"	October 24, 2019	--
Gbemi and Toolz talk about Pastor Wilson's infidelity, and sex.
4	"Episode 4 - BBN Fanatics"	October 31, 2019	--
Gbemi and Toolz talk abou crazy Big Brother Naija fanatics.
5	"Episode 5 - Dating Married Men"	November 7, 2019	--
Gbemi and Toolz speak out cyber begging, dating married men and lots more.
6	"Episode 6 - Trapping Men With Pregnancy"	November 14, 2019	--
Gbemi and Toolz speak about challenges of being a new mother, the idea of some women trapping men with pregnancy.
7	"Episode 7 - Women Are Trash Too"	November 21, 2019	--
Gbemi and Toolz take fan mail questions about women having multiple options in regards to marriage and can women date men younger than them.
8	"Episode 8 - Amebo Aunties"	November 28, 2019	--
Gbemi and Toolz talk about the Babcock University sex tape, December events to look forward to and the new male contraceptive about to hit the market.
9	"Episode 9 - Small Cheating"	December 5, 2019	--
Gbemi and Toolz speak about fraudulent pastors, cheating women and more.
10	"Episode 10 - Season Finale"	December 12, 2019	Mike Edwards, Tyomi.
Gbemi and Toolz had their first guests on the show, former Big Brother Naija housemate Mike Edwards and sex guru Tyomi

=== Season 2 ===
No.	Title	Original release date	Guest(s)
1	"Episode 1 - Valentines Is Coming"	February 13, 2020	--
Gbemi and Toolz discussed perfect Valentine gifts and sex playlist.
2	"Episode 2 - Cyber Bullying"	February 20, 2020	--
Gbemi and Toolz discussed cyber bullying.
3	"Episode 3 - Gender Roles"	February 27, 2020	--
Gbemi and Toolz talked about Burna Boy's hysterical comment and Pete Edochie's comment on gender roles as an African man.
4	"Episode 4 - Break Or Break Up"	March 5, 2020	--
Gbemi and Toolz discussed taking breaks in relationships.
5	"Episode 5 - Living Gay In Nigeria"	March 13, 2020	Walter
Gbemi and Toolz Discussed sexuality. And living as a gay person in Lagos.
6	"Episode 6 - Never Have I Ever"	March 19, 2020	--
Gbemi and Toolz played a "Never Have I Ever" with the crew.
7	"Episode 7 - Quarantine"	April 18, 2020	--
The first stay at home edition. The talked about the new normal.
8	"Episode 8 - Twerking On IG"	April 24, 2020	--
They discussed consequences on present decisions made.
9	"Episode 9 - Put A Finger Down"	May 1, 2020	--
It's the last stay-home lockdown edition. The duo played a game.
10	"Episode 10 - Back In The Studio"	May 8, 2020	--
The duo discussed about public confrontation, Johnny Depp and Adele
11	"Episode 11 - Money Is Your Lubricant"	May 14, 2020	--
Gbemi and Toolz discussed raising a male child and they also discussed PDA.
12	"Episode 12 - Split The Bill Or Not"	May 21, 2020	--
Gbemi and Toolz discussed child abuse and Splitting the bill on a date.
13	"Episode 13 - Season 2 Finale"	May 28, 2020	Bizzle Osikoya
The season finale of the covid season. The Duo spoke to Bizzle Osikoya over the phone on artiste development and music promotion in Nigeria. and spoke about the Cynthia Morgan saga.

=== Season 3 ===
No.	Title	Original release date	Guest(s)
1	"Episode 1 - The Catch Up"	April 15, 2021	--
Gbemi and Toolz caught up and all that had happened while they were off air and their feature on CNN inside africa documentary.
2	"Episode 2 - E Chokeee!!!"	April 22, 2021	--
Gbemi and Toolz discuss feminism.
3	"Episode 3 - Filter Or No Filter"	April 29, 2021	--
The duo responded to a fan mail who's planning to move back to Lagos, Nigeria. They also discuss sexual fetish.
4	"Episode 4 - Sexual Assault In Nigeria"	May 6, 2021	--
Gbemi and Toolz shared their thoughts on being the opposite sex for a day. They also discussed sexual assault in Nigeria.
5	"Episode 5 - Love in the 21st century"	May 13, 2021	--
The duo discussed The couples on Blue Therapy and love in the 21st century.
6	"Episode 6 - Dating in Lagos"	May 20, 2021	Segun Emdin, Moni Osibodu
On this episode, Segun Emdin and Moni Osibodu shared some of their dating experiences with the duo, Gbemi and Toolz.
7	"Episode 7 - What's wrong in dating women in their thirties"	May 27, 2021	--
Gbemi and Toolz talked about how they spent their 20s, giving TMI on the internet, fraud and body count as a factor of age.
8	"Episode 8 - Dealing with drug addiction"	June 3, 2021	Kenneth
Gbemi and Toolz talked about those battling drug addiction in Nigeria and keeping your options open until you find the right one.
9	"Episode 9 - What Do Strippers Really Do In Nigeria?"	June 10, 2021	Somi Val, Debchina
Gbemi and Toolz talked about the Nigerian Twitter Ban. They also get industry experts to "talk it" about WHAT it takes to be a stripper in Nigeria, their experiences and the dos and dont's of stripping.
10	"Episode 10 - Never Have I Ever?"	June 17, 2021	--
Gbemi and Toolz talked about the Tiwa & Seyi leaked video, some Lagos wild nights before ending with a game of never have I ever.
11	"Episode 11 - Let's Talk About Sex Baby!"	June 24, 2021	Dr. Rasheed Abassi, Yeside Olayinka-Agbola
On this episode, Gbemi and Toolz talked about sexual health for men and sexual pleasure for women. They had men's doctor, Dr Abassi of Heritage Mens Clinic and a sex therapist on the show.
12	"Episode 12 - Pretty Privilege!"	July 1, 2021	--
Gbemi and Toolz discussed pretty privilege, entitlement, respond to some fan mail and dig into an apparent murder case.
13	"Episode 13 - Surface Level Friendship!"	July 8, 2021	TBA
On this episode, Gbemi and Toolz discussed money in relationships, entitlement and respond to some fan mail.
14	"Episode 14 - Cosmetic Surgery!"	July 15, 2021	Dr. David, Omohtee.
Gbemi and Toolz discussed everything about cosmetic surgery with a Plastic Surgeon, Dr. David and a botched surgery victim, Omohtee.
15	"Episode 15 - The Baby Episode!"	July 21, 2021	--
The duos discussed in-depth personal insights about their maternity journey, pregnancy, delivery and raising babies.
16	"Episode 16 - Season Finale"	July 29, 2021	Ibrahim Suleiman
Gbemi and Toolz discussed pregnancy, delivery and raising babies journey with guest Host, Ibrahim Suleiman.

=== Season 4 ===
No.	Title	Original release date	Guest(s)
1	"Episode 1 - Season Premiere"	October 14, 2021	--
Gbemi and Toolz discussed everything they have missed since they have been off.
2	"Episode 2 - Celebrity Encounter"	October 21, 2021	--
On this episode, the duo, Gbemi and Toolz talked about their nicest and meanest celebrity encounters
3	"Episode 3 - Weight Loss Journey"	October 28, 2021	Uriel Oputa, Yummie Ogbebor
On this episode, Gbemi and Toolz, talked to their guests, former Big Brother Naija housemate, Uriel and Image consultant, Yummie about their weight loss journeys. What they faced? How losing weight changed their lives? How long it took? How they have been able to maintain their current weight.
4	"Episode 4 - The Fertility Episode"	November 4, 2021	Dr. Toyin Ajayi
Gbemi and Toolz discussed all things fertility related in men and women with Dr. Toyin Ajayi from The Bridge Clinic.
5	"Episode 5 - Tell Me A Secret!"	November 11, 2021	--
On this episode, the Off-Air gang shared their confessions with Gbemi and Toolz.
6	"Episode 6 - It's Don Jazzy Again!!!"	November 18, 2021	Don Jazzy
Gbemi and Toolz discussed all things music and life with Don Jazzy on this episode.
7	"Episode 7 - Sexual Harassment In The Work Place!"	November 25, 2021	--
On this episode, Gbemi and Toolz talked about sexual harassment in a work environment.
8	"Episode 8 - Why Gay Men Marry Straight Women!"	December 2, 2019	Kehinde Bademosi, Joeboy
On this episode, Gbemi and Toolz chatted with Kehinde Bademosi on why gay men marry straight women. The episode also featured an interview with Joeboy and a musical performance.
9	"Episode 9 - The Best Sex Of Your Life"	December 9, 2021	Soul Spice
On this episode, Gbemi and Toolz dispel myths and discuss options, tips and tricks for a sex life with sex expert Soul Spice.
10	"Episode 10 - Season Finale"	December 16, 2021	Falz
On the season finale, Gbemi and Toolz had a chat with Falz the bhad guy as they discussed all things, music, movies and highs and lows of 2021.

=== Season 5 ===
No.	Title	Original release date	Guest(s)
1	"Episode 1 - Private Jet Life, Baby!!!"	April 7, 2022	--
Gbemi and Toolz Kicked off the season with that inside gist on the high-flying jet wives of Lagos, the ultimate Slap and just all the reasons #Offair is happy to be back!
2	"Episode 2 - Can Your Spec, Murder You?"	April 14, 2022	--
On this episode, Gbemi & Toolz taled about all the mess from Nkechi and her Ex, domestic abuse and religious covers in Osinachi's home, and is only fans harbouring Tobe's killer?
3	"Episode 3 - Yahoo Boy With A Conscience"	April 21, 2022	Richard
On this episode, Gbemi & Toolz looked into the life of an ex yahoo boy, what it took to start, what it took to practise and why he stopped.
4	"Episode 4 - Real Housewives Of Lagos Special"	April 28, 2022	Iyabo Ojo Fespris, Mariam Adeyemi Timmer, Chioma Ikokwu
Gbemi and Toolz dived into every gist and juicy with the cast of Nigeria number one reality TV show, Real Housewives of Lagos.
5	"Episode 5 - You've Got A Mail"	May 5, 2022	Praiz
This episode was fan mail episode dedicated to the fans. It also featured Praiz's performance and a quick chat with him on fan love, making music and being reckless.
6	"Episode 6 - Parenting 101: Your Toddler Needs To Know Sex!"	May 12, 2022	Oluwaseun Osikoya
With the crazy of the world, and turn of events, more young children are the center of attacks and abuse. Gbemi and Toolz sat with a Child and youth counsellor to understand better parenting, and dealing with children.
7	"Episode 7 - The Slay Life Ain't Cheap"	May 19, 2022	--
Gbemi and Toolz decided to take their viewers through the playbook of what it costs to stay cinched, and recognised as the ultimate celebrity red carpet slayer. Then wrapped up the episode with a musical performance by 1da Banton
8	"Episode 8 - Relationship Is Not Poverty Alleviation Scheme"	May 26, 2022	--
Gbemi and Toolz tackle the pressing relationship needs . From a sleepover gone bad to a girlfriend who needs a guarantor/sponsor not an actual boyfriend.
9	"Episode 9 - Creamy Pasta Or Nothing"	June 2, 2022	--
On this episode Gbemi and toolz discussed operations of restaurants in Lagos. Also a fan has shown concern about her boyfriends behaviour. they also tackle self pleasure & long distance relationships. It also featured musical performance from the duo, Oiza and Meyi.
10	"Episode 10 - Not 1, Not 2 But 3 Times The Goodness"	June 9, 2022	Osas Ighodaro
The season finale featured Osas Ighodaro and they talked her life, success living for social media and more.

=== Season 6 ===
No.	Title	Original release date	Guest(s)
1	"Episode 1 - New Season, New Studio, New Everything"	November 3, 2022	--
2	"Episode 2 - A Gift Or A Curse"	November 10, 2022	Toke Makinwa, Enioluwa.
On this episode, Gbemi & Toolz played 'Never Have I Ever' with Toke and Enioluwa.
3	"Episode 3 - Black Tax"	November 17, 2022	--
On this episode, Gbemi & Toolz talked about the reporter that disgraced them, 'Chadwick Boswick', black tax and how it affects people.
4	"Episode 4 - Polyamory"	November 24, 2022	Hermes Iyele
Gbemi and Toolz dived discussed polyamory with Hermes.
5	"Episode 5 - Plastic Surgery"	December 1, 2022	--
6	"Episode 6 - Why Did I Get Married"	December 8, 2022	--
7	"Episode 7 - VVIP Weddings"	December 15, 2022	Funke Bucknor-Obruthe
Gbemi and Toolz had Funke Buckor on the show to discuss wedding costs and trends.
8	"Episode 8 - The Sex Episode!"	December 22, 2022	Vector, Olawunmi Esan
Gbemi and Toolz discussed sex, sex toys, sex myth and more.
9	"Episode 9 - Lagos Night Life"	December 29, 2022	Richard Nnadi
On this episode Gbemi and Toolz discussed nightlife in Lagos with Richard.
10	"Episode 10 - Dating In Lagos"	January 5, 2023	Eso Dike, Simi Drey
11	"Episode 11 - What's Your Spec"	January 12, 2023	--
12	"Episode 12 - Faking It For The Gram"	January 19, 2023	Pretty Mike
On this episode, Gbemi and Toolz discussed living fake life in Lagos.
13	"Episode 13 - Sugar Baby"	January 26, 2023	Trap Queen
On the season finale, Gbemi and Toolz talked about "Glucose Gurdians", Prince Harry, Celibacy and much more.

== Awards and nominations ==
Year	Award	Category	Recipient(s)	Result	Ref.
2023	Africa Magic Viewers' Choice Awards	Best Unscripted Original	Off-Air with Gbemi & Toolz	Nominated	
2023	Pulse Influencer Awards	Podcast Influencer Of The Year	Off-Air with Gbemi & Toolz	Nominated	
