= Detty December Festival =

Annual music festival in Nigeria

DETTY DECEMBER FEST
- Status: Active
- Genre: Afrobeats, Amapiano, RnB, Hip hop, Dancehall, Gqom, Afroswing
- Date: December
- Frequency: Annually
- Venue: Detty December Village
- Location: Lagos
- Country: Nigeria
- Years active: 2025 - present
- Founders: Darey Deola Art Alade
- Organiser: Livespot360
- Website: dettydecfest.com

Detty December Fest (sometimes known as Detty December Festival) is an annual music, culture, and lifestyle event organized by Nigerian entertainment and lifestyle Livespot360. The first edition of Detty December Fest took place from December 7th to 31st 2025 in Lagos, Nigeria.

The first edition of Detty December Festival, originally planned for 2020, was postponed due to the COVID-19 pandemic. In 2021, Pheelz, a Nigerian record producer, and Livespot360 co-released “Detty December”, an eponymous theme song to celebrate Detty December activities and festivities that take place across different cities and states in Nigeria every year. Livespot360 later revived the concept and expanded it into Detty December Fest, a month-long cultural festival that will be held in Nigeria every year in December.

== History ==
In 2019, Darey and Deola Art Alade, co-founders of Livespot360, registered “Detty December Festival” under Class 41 for entertainment services such as festivals and events.

The first edition of Detty December Fest featured four concert experiences: The Grand Opening Concert, Juma Jux Live, Busta Rhymes Live and Gunna Live in Concert. The 2025 edition of Detty December Fest was held at Ilubirin, a water-front city in Ikoyi, Lagos, with a venue capacity of 20,000 people. Ticketing for the Detty December Festival was managed by DOT Tix and Tix.Africa.

Detty December Fest opened on December 7th 2025 with a performance by aerial ballerinas. Performing artists who headlined the opening night included FOLA, Wande Coal, OG Abbah, Darey, Ice Prince, Shoday, and Young John.

=== Detty December Fest Concerts (2025) ===
Juma Jux, a Tanzanian singer and songwriter, headlined Juma Jux Live in Concert on December 18th, marking his visit to Nigeria. At the Jux Live concert, Diamond Platnumz, a Tanzanian artist, performed and there was a special appearance by Flavour, a Nigerian musician. Other performers included Qing Madi, DJ Delvick, Ekunrawo, Broda Shaggi and aerial drummers.

Busta Rhymes Live in Concert took place on Friday December 19th. Busta Rhymes returned to Nigeria after 10 years to headline his concert at Detty December Fest. Tiwa Savage and M.I Abaga also performed on the same day at Ilubirin.

The Detty December Fest x WUN World Tour, which was headlined by Gunna, was held at Ilubirin on Monday December 29th. Gunna's concert was the Lagos stop on his Wun World Tour and it concluded the Detty December festival. Gunna's performance also featured a surprise appearance from Wizkid. Other performers at Gunna Live included Fayve, Ms DSF, Dope Ceaser, Do2dtun, Uncle Bubu, and Shenseea.
