= Detty December (Nigeria) =

Festivities of the Christmas holiday period

Detty December describes the festive season in Nigeria. The season often begins around December until after the new year or early January. The festive period is a season marked by its celebratory events The season is also a period when many Nigerians both within the country and in the diaspora, return home to celebrate with family and friends.

== Etymology and usage ==
In Nigerian Pidgin the term Detty is a corruption of "dirty", it implies festivities or celebration with no restraint during the Christmas and holiday season.

== Origin ==
The origin of the term is unclear. Some people have claimed that the celebration started after the 2004 Calabar Carnival in South south part of Nigeria, which was called "Africa's biggest street party" by Donald Duke, a former governor of Cross Rivers State. According to Nigerian magazine BellaNaija and The Guardian, the term was coined and popularized by Nigerian singer Mr. Eazi, who used it as a hashtag for his concert in Lagos in 2016. Mr Eazi also went on to trademark the term.

== Commercialisation and Formalisation ==
As Detty December gained wider recognition, it became increasingly associated with organised events and commercial activity within Nigeria’s entertainment sector, particularly in Lagos. In 2025, Nigerian creative agency, Livespot360 announced it trademarked the phrase "Detty December" in 2019

== Events ==
Detty December is a term often used by members of the Nigerian diaspora who have recently returned home. These recent returnees are often nicknamed IJGBs, an acronym standing for "I Just Got Back". The World Bank reports that remittances for the Nigerian diaspora during this period account for 4% of Nigeria's GDP, and show significant spending power when the expatriates come back home.

While Detty December is mostly associated with the cities, many of the returnees also use this opportunity to visit their countryside villages. Igbos refer to this as Nbịarute or ịlota ụlọ̀ (homecoming/Journeying home), during which close friends and families both from the diaspora and the cities specifically go home to their village countryside to celebrate the holidays and other festivals. Detty December primarily focuses on urban city visits by the Nigerian diaspora for festivities like Rhythm Unplugged, a concert that has been running since 2004 designed to promote Nigerian musicians and international artists. Lagos, a city in with a rich history of Owanbe and a thriving entertainment industry (being the home to the global music phenomenon Afrobeats) is often considered the face of Detty December.

A variety of events take place throughout this social calendar in Nigeria they include house parties, street carnivals, beach hangouts to concerts, weddings, nightclub. Among these social gatherings, the December concerts in the country is one of the pivotal events of the season and as such it draws on numerous musical artists and organizations to host performances during this period. Notably, these year-end concerts are not exclusive to renowned musical entities such as Flytime Fest which usually headlines top Nigerian Afrobeats stars like Burna Boy, Asake, Wizkid, Davido, Olamide, Rema, Ayra Starr; various businesses, state governments and even federal departments also curate concerts within this season. This trend results in substantial earnings for Nigerian artists, akin to the magnitude of the Super Bowl, as articulated by Afrobeats star Davido. In 2024 the Lagos State government hosted a Boat Regatta while in 2025 the Nigerian federal government held a good and culture festival for the Detty December season. The travel Nigerian diaspora makes back home during the December prompts the staging of weddings, synchronized with the congregation of friends and families for Christmas celebrations. These weddings often span entire days, culminating in lively after-parties.

=== List of specific events in timeframe ===
Some specific events organized in the 2025 detty december timeframe calendar are listed below.

Name	Date	Location
Nigerian Air Show	2–4 December 2025	Legend Hotel, Lagos
The Experience	5 December 2025	Tafawa Balewa Square
Shiloh	9–14 December 2025	The Ark, Ota, Ogun
Motherland 2025	15–21 December 2025	Lagos and Abuja
Rhythm Unplugged	21 December 2025	Eko Hotels and Suites
Flytime Fest	22–25 December 2025	Eko Hotels and Suites
Obi's House	Every Monday	Obi's House
Calabar Carneval	30 November 2025 - 1 January 2026	Calabar, Cross river
Detty Dec Fest	18 - 31 December	Ilubirin
Lagos Boat Regatta	TBD	Five Cowries Creek, Lagos

== Criticism ==
Driven partly by the spending of the visiting Nigerian diaspora and the purchasing power of foreign exchange rates, the government welcomes the influx and its impact on the economy. On the other hand, with the wealth on display starkly contrasting with the prevailing economic hardship of the locals, some residents fret at being shut out of their cities by the increased prices and traffic. The phenomenon has also caused strains on the inadequate facilities in the country. A common practice often decried by business owners during this season, are charge backs which are often done by the diaspora Nigerians who report the expenses spent during the December period as fraud, in an attempt to gain back money, this leads to financial losses for business owners.

== See also ==
- Detty December Festival
