= Detty December Fest =

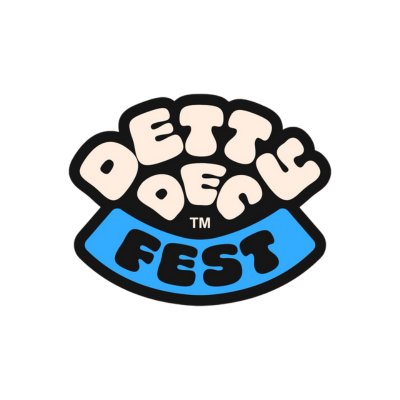
- Status: Active
- Frequency: Annually
- Location: Lagos
- Country: Nigeria
- Years active: 2025 - Present
- Inaugurated: December 7–31, 2025
- Founders: Deola Art Alade, Dare Art Alade
- Website: https://dettydecfest.com/

Detty December Fest is an annual music and cultural festival in Lagos, Nigeria. Produced by Livespot360, the inaugural edition took place in December 2025 at Ilubirin, Lagos, as part of the city's annual end of year entertainment season.

== Background ==
The term "Detty December" is commonly used to reference Nigeria's December entertainment and social activities. In December 2021, music producer Pheelz and Livespot360 released a song titled "Detty December", which was associated with the December festivities and Livespot X Festival.

Livespot360 subsequently developed the concept into the organized festival which held in December 2025.

== 2025 Edition ==
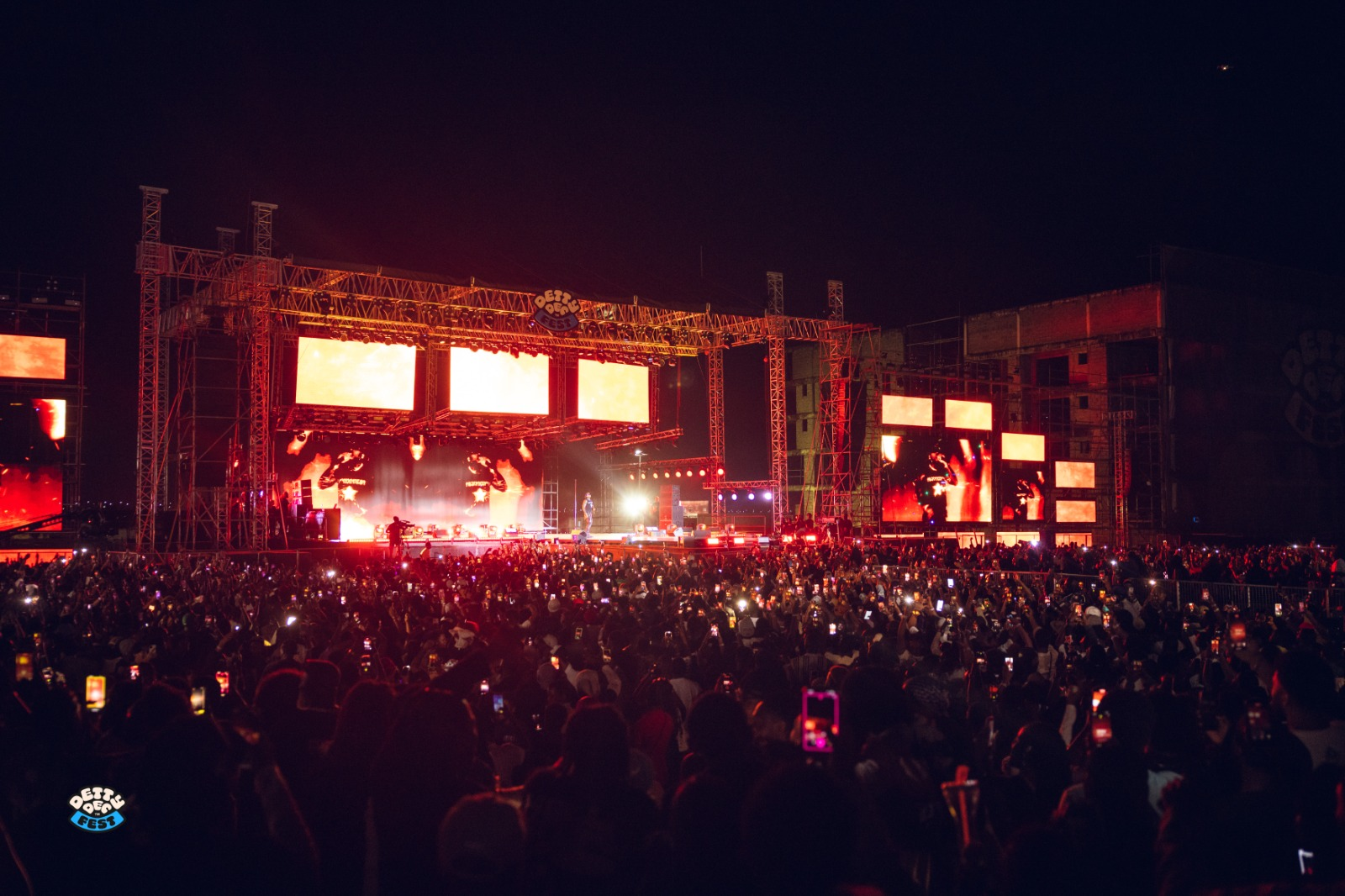
Image of the stage at Detty December Fest 2025

The inaugural edition was held in Lagos, Nigeria, from 7 to 31 December 2025.

The festival took place primarily at Ilubirin in Ikoyi. The programme included live performances by Nigerians and International musicians. Performers included Busta Rhymes, Gunna, Tiwa Savage, M.I Abaga, Wande Coal, Young Jonn, Ice Prince, Fola, Juma Jux, Shenseea, Phyno, Fave, Wizkid, Qing Madi and Diamond Platnumz, among others.

== See also ==
- Lagos Black Heritage Festival
- Durbar festival
