= Entertainment Week Africa =

Entertainment Week Africa (EWA), formerly Entertainment Week Lagos (EWL), is an annual creative summit produced by Livespot360. The event brings together creators, writers, performers, and entertainers across in Music, Film & TV, Fashion, AI & Tech, Live Production, and Entrepreneurship.

== History ==
EWA was founded in 2022 by Deola Art Alade and Darey Art Alade. The event is organized and produced by Livespot360.

=== Entertainment Week Lagos 2022 ===
In 2022, the inaugural Entertainment Week Lagos (EWL) themed “The New Wave” ran for eight days across multiple venues in Lagos, featuring about 35 speakers and educators, 40 digital artists, and 30 musical acts. It also included workshops. The closing event was the Livespot X Festival, which showcased performers: The Mavin Records Stars, Tiwa Savage, and Kizz Daniel.

=== Entertainment Week Lagos 2023 ===
The 2023 edition lasted eight days and included multiple components: panel sessions, masterclasses, workshops, film screenings, exhibitions, and showcases between December 13 to 20, 2023. Personalities at the event included Hannatu Musawa, Mo Abudu, Steve Stoute, Chioma Ude, Titi Ogufere, Jade Osiberu, Mai Atafo, FK Abudu, Eku Edewor, Nicole Asinugo, Diana Eneje, among others.

=== Entertainment Week Lagos 2024 ===
In 2024, the third edition of Entertainment Week Lagos (EWL) themed “Connecting Tides” held between December 10 to 15, 2024, at the Livespot Entertarium in Lagos. It was focused on how African creatives can use technology, innovation, and storytelling to highlight cultural authenticity and reach both local and global audiences.

Notable personalities who participated as speakers included Funke Akindele, Malik Afegbua, Odumodu Blvck, Enioluwa Adeoluwa, Joey Akan, Frank Edoho, Lisa Russell, Tega Mavin, Nausheen Dadabhoy, Mai Atafo, Deola Art Alade, Darey Art Alade, Simi Badiru, Dolapo Amusat, Jola Ayeye, and FK Abudu.
