= Naked (Darey album) =

Studio album by Darey
- Released: 13 October 2015
- Recorded: 2015
- Genre: Afrobeat; Afropop; jùjú; soul; highlife; R&B
- Length: 48:25
- Label: Livespot
- Producer: Darey (exec.); Oscar Heman-Ackah; Vtek; Cobhams Asuquo

Darey chronology
Double Dare (2011)	Naked (2015)	Way Home (2020)

Singles from Naked
- 1. "Pray for Me" Released: 7 July 2015; 2. "Asikò Laiye (Remix)" Released: 7 July 2015

Naked is the fourth studio album by Nigerian R&B and Afro-soul singer Darey. It was released on 13 October 2015 through Livespot Entertainment. Featuring a blend of Afrobeat, Afropop, jùjú, R&B, highlife, and soul, the album features guest appearances from singer Aṣa, rapper Olamide, and the South African band Soweto Gospel Choir. Production was primarily handled by Oscar Heman-Ackah, with other production from Vtek, Cobhams Asuquo, and Darey himself serving as the executive producer.

== Background and singles ==
Darey announced the album when he released two singles: "Pray for Me" featuring the Soweto Gospel Choir, and the remix of the first track off the album, "Asikò Laiye" featuring indigenous Nigerian rapper Olamide. "Pray for Me" with the Soweto Gospel Choir, was released on 7 July 2015, and was produced by Oscar Heman-Ackah. The remix of the first track, "Asikò Laiye", features Olamide, was released the same day and was produced by Vtek. "Pray for Me" was nominated for Best Vocal Performance (Male), and won Best R&B Single and Best Recording of the Year at the Headies 2016.

== Composition ==
The album opens with "Asikò Laiye", which borrows a drum beat from Fela Kuti's "Fear Not For Man" and talks about "how there is a time for everything and how profitable waiting can be." "Òrékeléwà" is a highlife-inspired love song characterized by its guitar riffs and Yoruba percussion. It echoes classic love songs from Nigerian music history, blending traditional elements with contemporary sounds. "You're Beautiful" blends Anglophone lyrics with Juju rhythms and includes a Yoruba refrain towards the end, celebrating the beauty and power of women while incorporating traditional Nigerian music elements. "Love You Die" is a mid-tempo song that focuses on expressions of affection and flattery, set to a call-and-response style typical of Nigerian English. "Lie To You", a low-tempo track about unrequited love, features Cobhams Asuquo’s piano work. The song’s introspective lyrics and Darey’s vocal performance highlight themes of heartache and longing. "Pray for Me" features gospel influences and Yoruba lyrics, telling the story of a young man seeking success in the city and is reminiscent of Timi Dakolo's "Wish Me Well" and M.I Abaga's "Money". "Delilah (Taxi Driver)" is a tribute to Bobby Benson's "Taxi Driver", which updates the original narrative with a more modern context. It reflects themes of societal and moral commentary through a contemporary lens. The remix of "Asikò Laiye" adds a new dimension of street-hop to the original track, though it has been critiqued for its less impactful lyrical content compared to the main album. "Inside Of You" is a duet with Aṣa that blends soulful melodies with a suggestive vibe, exploring themes of intimacy and connection. "I Go Make Am" is a motivational track that relies on Darey’s vocal strength to convey a message of perseverance and determination, distinct from more exuberant anthems in its restrained approach. "Champion" shares the title of Nigerian reggae artist General Pype's 2010 single, and is an empowering song that might also reflect Darey’s personal or professional aspirations. Its upbeat tempo and motivating lyrics celebrate triumph and success.

== Critical reception ==
The album received generally positive reviews from critics. 'Joey Akan of Pulse Nigeria praised Darey's Naked and described it as a "conceptual piece of beauty" that blends traditional African elements like talking drums with modern influences, showcasing Darey's emotional depth and artistry. Songs like "Pray for Me" and "Lie to You" delivered soulful, heartfelt performances, while tracks like "Asikò Laiye" highlighted his versatility. The album was rated 4.0/5, described as "smoking hot" and favoring substance over trends. David Hundeyin writing for Nigerian Entertainment Today described Naked as Darey's "best yet," a "seminal piece of work" blending Afrobeat, jùjú, R&B, highlife, and soul into a cohesive and compelling album. Highlighting tracks like "Pray for Me," "Inside of You," and "Àsìkò Laiyé," the review praised its flawless production, cultural depth, and storytelling, calling it "nothing short of superb." The album was rated 4.5/5. Jaguda ranked Naked #3 on their list of the 10 Best Nigerian Albums of 2015.

Wilfred Okiche of 360nobs reviewed the album as a cohesive and refreshing blend of retro sounds and contemporary influences, showcasing Darey’s growth and versatility. While noting some underwhelming moments like the Aṣa collaboration on "Inside of You", he concluded, "It isn’t the stripped-down confessional hinted by the title, but it is alive and burning with emotion. Sometimes that is enough". Oris Aigbokhaevbolo of Music in Africa praised Naked for its cohesiveness and balance between traditional and western influences, noting it as an improvement over previous efforts. The album features standout tracks like "Pray for Me" with the Soweto Gospel Choir and "Inside of You" with Asa, showcasing a blend of seriousness and playfulness. Aigbokhaevbolo concluded that Darey has delivered "a seriously good album," highlighting its aural excellence and refined artistry.

== Track listing ==
Naked track listing
No.	Title	Writer(s)	Producer(s)	Length
1.	"Asikò Laiye"	Dare Art Alade	Vtek	3:32
2.	"Òrékeléwà"	Alade	Oscar Heman-Ackah	3:49
3.	"You're Beautiful"	Alade	Heman-Ackah	3:22
4.	"Love You Die"	Alade	Heman-Ackah	3:32
5.	"Lie To You"	Alade	Cobhams Asuquo	4:14
6.	"Pray for Me" (featuring Soweto Gospel Choir)	Alade	Heman-Ackah	3:55
7.	"Áya Mí"	Alade	Heman-Ackah	3:26
8.	"Asikò Laiye (Remix)" (featuring Olamide)	Alade; Olamide Adedeji	Vtek	3:33
9.	"Delilah (Taxi Driver)"	Alade; Bobby Benson	Heman-Ackah	3:22
10.	"Inside Of You" (featuring Aṣa)	Alade; Bukola Elemide	Heman-Ackah	4:35
11.	"Want You Back"	Alade	Heman-Ackah	4:02
12.	"I Go Make Am"	Alade	Heman-Ackah	2:49
13.	"Champion"	Alade	Heman-Ackah	4:08
Total length:				48:25

== Personnel ==
Credits adapted from album's back cover.

- Oscar Heman-Ackah - production, A&R
- Vtek - production, mixing, mastering
- Cobhams Asuquo - production
- Olaitan Dada - mixing

== Release history ==
Release history and formats for Naked
Region	Date	Format	Label
Various	13 October 2015	CD; digital download	Livespot
