= Jah Guide Me =

Single by Darey

from the EP Way Home
- Released: 14 August 2020
- Genre: Afropop; R&B; reggae
- Length: 2:48
- Label: Livespot
- Songwriters: Dare Art Alade; Phillip Kayode Moses
- Producer: Pheelz

Darey singles chronology
"Pray for Me" and "Asiko Laiye" (2015)	"Jah Guide Me" (2020)	"Jojo" (2020)

Music video
- "Jah Guide Me" on YouTube

"Jah Guide Me" is a song by Nigerian singer Darey. It was released on 14 August 2020 as the lead single from his only EP Way Home (2020), marking his first single in five years. The song was co-written and produced by Pheelz. The song mixes Afropop, R&B, and reggae, and centers on seeking guidance during hard times.

== Background ==
"Jah Guide Me" serves as the first single released by Darey in five years, following "Pray for Me" featuring the Soweto Gospel Choir. The song was made available for pre-order on 11 August 2020. He promoted the single's release on his Instagram handle, stating "Just like many of you, 2020 has so far, brought a handful of uncertainties my way. But the fact is that God isn't surprised. So I guess it's up to all of us to submit and be led.... #JahGuideMe #Aug14 LINK IN BIO TO PRE-ORDER." In an interview with Daily Trust, Darey said that the song drew its ideas from the economic strain people faced during the COVID-19 pandemic and from the way many turn to God during difficult moments.

== Composition and themes ==
"Jah Guide Me" consists of "a feel-good, relaxed production, filled with warm percussion and uplifting brass arrangements," and talks about seeking guidance from God to protect him from worldly evil.

== Reception ==
Emmanuel Esomnofu of Notjustok included "Jah Guide Me" in his "Best New Music" column, saying it has "powerful production and a virtuoso performance from [Darey]."

== Music video ==
The accompanying music video for "Jah Guide Me" was released on 14 August 2020, coinciding with the audio's release. Directed by Mex Ossai and Darey, the video opens with an aerial view of Lagos and features scenes of white sand beaches, sanctuaries, fields, and waters. Darey described the video as "carefully styled and curated", giving a vibe he states as "Afrofuturism." The video received airplay on television networks such as Yo! MTV on Pluto TV and BET Soul Worldwide, reaching an audience of over 50 million viewers. Darafunmi Olanrewaju of Nigerian Entertainment Today stated that the video "brilliantly captures the heart and soul of what makes Darey such an accomplished performer," praising it for its "skillful use of colours." He then concluded that it "sets the bar for visual storytelling and it is a welcome call-back to the good ol’ days of Darey videos." A writer for tooXclusive called it "extremely, empathetically compassionate and a poignant representation of humanity."

== Commercial performance ==
By 21 August 2020, "Jah Guide Me" debuted at number one on the TurnTable Top Radio Songs chart. It stayed at number one for the tracking week of 21 August to 27 August 2020. It received heavy rotation on Cool FM stations in Lagos, Kano, Port Harcourt, and Abuja, along with Wazobia FM in those same cities, plus Naija FM, The Beat FM in Lagos and Abuja, and Urban 96.5. The song fell to number 47 on the chart for the week of 28 August to 3 September 2020. "Jah Guide Me" peaked at number 49 on the Official Singles Downloads Chart for the week of 20 August to 26 August 2020.

== Charts ==
Chart performance for "Jah Guide Me"
Chart (2020)	Peak position
Nigeria (TurnTable Top Radio Songs)	2
UK Singles Downloads (Official Charts)	49
