= Flytime Fest =

Annual music festival in Nigeria

- Genre: Afrobeats, Hip hop, R&B, Pop
- Dates: December (annual)
- Locations: Lagos, Nigeria
- Years active: 2017–present
- Founders: Cecil Hammond
- Website: flytimefest.com

Flytime Fest is an annual music festival held each December in Lagos, Nigeria, showcasing performances by prominent Nigerian and international artists across genres including Afrobeats, hip hop, and R&B. Organized by Flytime Promotions, the event evolved from the earlier Rhythm Unplugged concert series established in 2004 by Cecil Hammond.

== History ==
Flytime Fest originated as Rhythm Unplugged in 2004, an event established to showcase emerging and established Nigerian talent in music and comedy. The event expanded significantly, transforming in 2018 into the multi-day festival known as Flytime Fest, incorporating international artists and diversifying its musical scope.

== Event format ==
Flytime Fest typically spans four to five days at Lagos' Eko Convention Centre. Each festival day features different headlining and supporting acts from Nigeria and abroad, contributing significantly to Lagos' entertainment scene during the popular tourist season known as "Detty December."

== Cultural impact ==
Flytime Fest contributes significantly to the "Detty December" festive season, when Lagos attracts international tourists and diaspora Nigerians, enhancing Lagos' reputation as a cultural and entertainment hub.

== Editions ==
- 2017: Held as a two-day event featuring Rhythm Unplugged and a headline concert by Wizkid.
- 2018: Included headline performances by Olamide, Bobby Brown, and Bell Biv DeVoe.
- 2019: Featured Megan Thee Stallion, Burna Boy, Tiwa Savage, and Boyz II Men, marking the festival's international appeal.
- 2020: Canceled due to the COVID-19 pandemic.
- 2021: Headlined by Wizkid and Davido; however, logistical issues drew mixed reviews.
- 2022: Included performances by Wizkid, Asake, and Craig David, enhancing its international profile.
- * 2023: Featured performances by Davido and Asake. The event concluded with Asake's Christmas Special.
- 2024: Celebrated 20 years since Rhythm Unplugged with headliners including Gunna (making his African debut), Olamide, and Davido.
- 2025: Featured performances by Flavour, Olamide, Asake, and Davido. The event marked Asake's return to performing in Nigeria after a two-year absence.
