= Timileyin =

Nigerian male given name of Yoruba origin

- Gender: Male
- Language: Yoruba

Origin
- Word/name: Nigeria
- Meaning: Support me

listen

Timileyin is a Nigerian male given name of Yoruba origin meaning "Support me" or Have my back."

== Notable people ==
- Akintunde Abiodun Timileyin, singer
- Adeleke Timileyin Tunde, Afrobeat musician
- Samad Timileyin Kadiri, footballer
