= Deola Art Alade =

Nigerian entrepreneur, media personality, and cultural curator

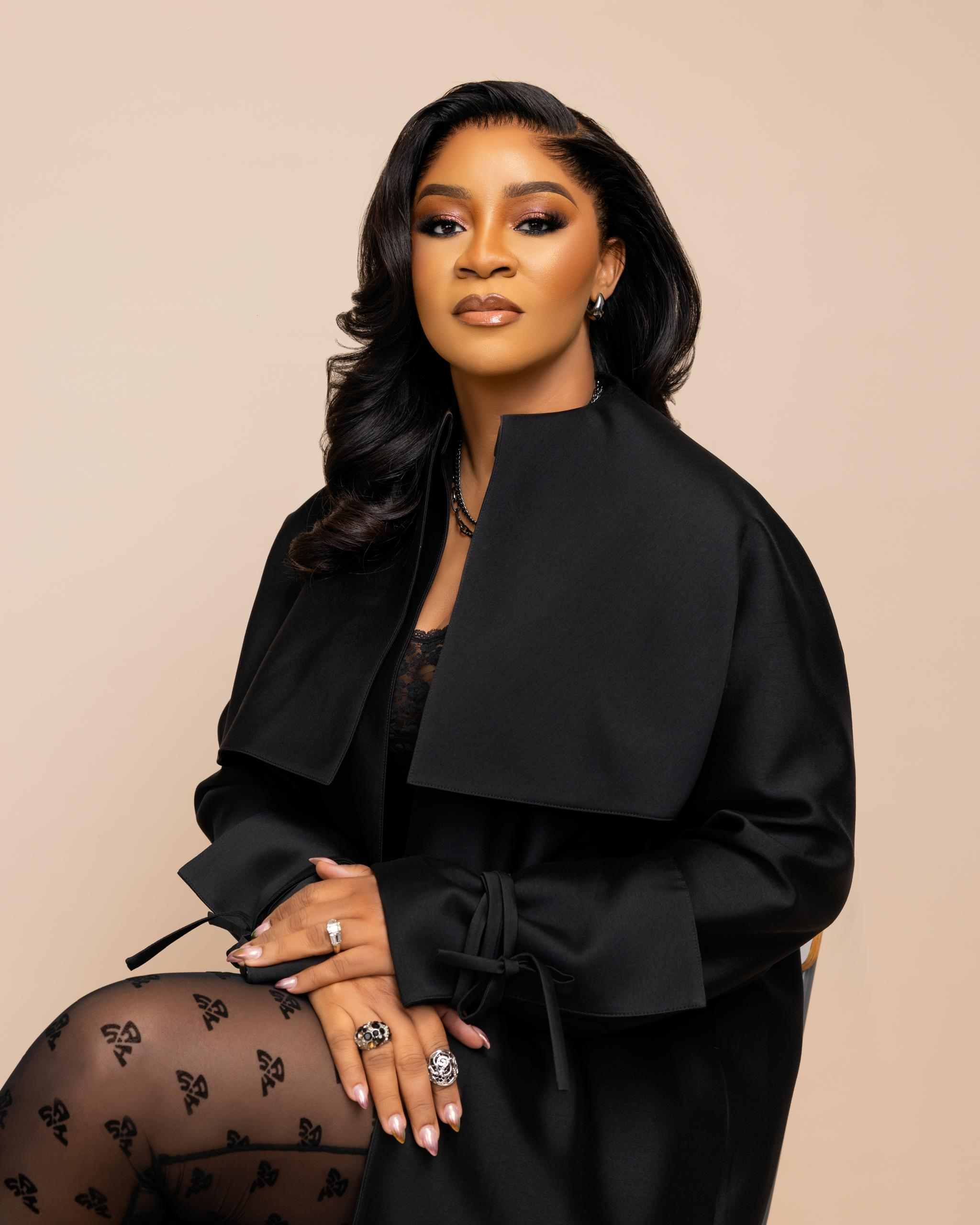
- Born: Nigeria
- Education: Harvard Business School (Executive Education in Business Strategy, Leadership, and Innovation)
- Occupations: Entrepreneur, Media Personality, Cultural Curator, TV & Film Producer
- Known for: Founder and Group CEO of Livespot360; Creator of Livespot X Festival; Founder Entertainment Week Africa (EWA); Founder Detty December Fest; Convener Women Driving Culture
- Spouse: Darey (married 2006 - present)

Deola Art Alade is a Nigerian entrepreneur, creative executive, media personality, and cultural curator. She is the founder and Group CEO of Livespot360. The Voice Nigeria S3, Last One Laughing Naija(LOL Naija) and The Real Housewives of Lagos, and for founding Entertainment Week Africa (EWA), Livespot X Festival and Detty December Fest.

== Early life and education ==
Deola attended Federal Government Girls’ College, Onitsha. She later obtained a Bachelor of Fine Arts & Design degree majoring in Graphic Design from Obafemi Awolowo University (OAU) Ile-Ife. In 2021 she attended the Harvard Business School, where she completed executive education programs in business strategy, leadership, and innovation in 2024.

== Career ==
=== Early Ventures ===
She began her career as an entrepreneur after founding Windowoks (a curtain making company) and Design Studeo (an interior design firm).

In mid-2000s, she pivoted into entertainment with the launch of Soul Muzik, a record label company that developed and managed Darey Art Alade, Seyi Shay and Del B.

==== Livespot360 ====
In 2013, she produced "Darey Presents...Love Like a Movie", a valentine-themed concert series which featured Kim Kardashian, Kelly Rowland and Ciara. In 2013, alongside her husband, Darey Art Alade, she also founded Livespot360.

==== Rent a Rig & Livespot Entertarium ====
In December 2017, she launched a gear rental company, Rent a Rig, to provide and supply technical equipment and fabricate sets for the live event and film industries. Deola launched Livespot Entertarium in September 2022.

==== Entertainment Week Africa (EWA) ====
Deola founded Entertainment Week Lagos, an event platform designed to accelerate collaboration and job creation in Africa's creative economy in 2022. The platform was later rebranded to Entertainment Week Africa in 2025 and converges business leaders, creatives and investors across music, film & tv, fashion, AI & tech, live event experiences and creative enterprises.

==== Detty December Fest ====
In 2019, Deola Art Alade registered the Detty December trademark and Detty December Ltd. While the events were initially planned for 2020, they were postponed due to the COVID-19 pandemic. In 2025, the platform, supported by the Federal Ministry of Arts and Culture, resurfaced as a month long festival in a 40,000 capacity space at Ilubirin with local and international acts like Gunna, Busta Rhymes, Juma Jux, MI Abaga, Tiwa Savage.

== Advocacy and Philanthropy ==
Deola Art Alade is an advocate for diversity, equity and inclusion (DEI) in the creative industries focusing on youth empowerment and women in leadership.

== Marriage ==
She is married to Nigerian singer and entertainer Darey Art Alade. They have two children.

== Awards, Recognitions and Nominations ==
- Africa Magic Viewers' Choice Award (AMVCA), Best Series Unscripted - Last One Laughing Naija, Real Housewives of Lagos Season 1 (2023)
- Top 50 Most Influential Women in Marketing & Communications WIMCA (2023)
- Marketing Edge: Women Pioneering Excellence in Nigeria's Experiential Marketing Landscape (2023)
- 60 Most Influential Event Professionals in Nigeria, The Event Industry Powerless (2024)
- MIPAD - Top 100 Futurists & Innovators in Celebration of World Creativity & Innovation Day (2024)
- Business Day - 50 Inspiring Nigerian Women (2025)
- Arise News - Top 100 Woman of Impact (2026)

== Boards and Advisory Roles ==
- Head, 2024 NXT Honors Selection Committee
- Mentor, Femme It Forward NextGemFemme Mentorship Program
- Member Advisory Board, Design Week Lagos
- Voting Member, The Recording Academy Class of 2025 (Grammy Awards)
- Member, International Academy of Television (Emmys)
