= Livespot360 =

Nigerian creative solutions company

Livespot360 is an entertainment and production company located in Lagos, Nigeria. It was founded in 2014 by Deola Art Alade and Darey Art Alade, the company has produced large-scale live experiences, television shows, reality TV shows, conferences, events and activations for continental and international brands.

The company has hosted interactive entertainment, culture, and lifestyle events such as Livespot X Festival, Entertainment Week Africa (formerly known as Entertainment Week Lagos), Fuze Festival Talent Show and award winning television shows like Real Housewives of Lagos and Amazon Prime's Last One Laughing Naija.

== History ==
Livespot360 was founded in 2014. Initially operating as a creative agency that offered production, digital marketing, advertising, experiential marketing, and entertainment services.

=== Livespot X Festival ===
Livespot X Festival is an annual entertainment event. It has included performances by Nigerian and international artists such as Cardi B, Burna Boy, and Tiwa Savage. On the 7th of December 2019, Cardi B made her African debut at the first edition of the Livespot X Festival and performed at venues in Lagos and Accra, Ghana.

=== Entertainment Week Africa ===
Entertainment Week Lagos (EWL) now known as Entertainment Week Africa (EWA), is an annual convention that gathers creative professionals, local and international artists, entertainers, innovators, and rising talent held at the Livespot Entertarium (aka Livespot Entertainment Centre) in Lagos, Nigeria. It was founded by Deola Art Alade and Darey Art Alade in 2022.

The event features panel discussions, performances, and networking opportunities focused on trends and business development in Africa's creative industries.

Rebranded and expanded from EWL to Entertainment Week Africa (EWA) in August 2025, the 2025 edition of was be held in five locations across the city and featured panels, performances, film showcases, tech exhibitions, masterclasses, deal rooms, and fashion and food pop-ups.

=== The Voice Nigeria ===
Livespot360 was involved in the production of the third season of The Voice Nigeria, a televised music competition that aired in 2021.

== Notable works ==
=== The Real Housewives of Lagos ===
In 2022, Livespot360 through its film & tv production vertical - Livespot Studios, served as the executive producer of The Real Housewives of Lagos, the Nigerian adaptation of the international Real Housewives franchise. The first season of the show got nominated and won AMVCA's in the 2023 Africa Magic Viewers Choice Awards and received 2 nominations in the 2026 Africa Magic Viewers Choice Awards

=== Love Like a Movie ===
Livespot launched a live concert series, Love like a Movie, in 2013 which combined theatrical performance, music, and multimedia storytelling to deliver immersive entertainment experiences. The first edition of Love Like a Movie was a Valentine’s Day special event that was held in Lagos in 2013.

The second edition of the Love Like a Movie concert took place on Saturday, 15 February 2014 in Lagos and featured Kelly Rowland as a co-headliner alongside Nigerian artists Waje, Tiwa Savage, Timi Dakolo, Muna, and Eva.

The third edition of Love Like a Movie concert was held in February 2018 at the Eko Convention Centre and featured Ciara as the international guest star. The 2018 music event also featured live performances by Yemi Alade, Adekunle Gold, Iyanya, Sound Sultan, and Omawunmi.

=== Last One Laughing (LOL Naija) ===
In 2024, Livespot360 served as the executive producer of Last One Laughing (LOL Naija), the Nigerian adaptation of the internationally successful LOL comedy franchise created by Amazon Prime Video.

== Awards ==
- Creative Solutions Company of the Decade (Marketing Edge Magazine).
- Lagos Advertising & Ideas Festival Award 2020 (LAIF Awards)
- Africa Magic Viewers' Choice Award - Best Costume Designer (Movie/TV Series): The Real Housewives of Lagos
- The Drum Awards for Event Design 2023
- Nigerian Marketing Awards 2022 - Excellence in Experiential Marketing: Heineken Trophy Tour

== See also ==
- Livespot X Festival
