= The Real Housewives of Lagos =

Nigerian reality TV series

- Genre: Reality Television
- Based on: The Real Housewives
- Presented by: Uti Nwachukwu (s. 1, 3–); Latasha Ngwube (s. 2)
- Starring: Laura Ikeji; Mariam Timmer; Carolyna Hutchings; Toyin Lawani-Adebayo; Chioma Ikokwu; Iyabo Ojo; Faith Morey; Tania Omotayo; Dabota Lawson; Adeola Adeyemi; Sophia Momodu
- Country of origin: Nigeria
- Original language: English
- No. of seasons: 3
- No. of episodes: 40

Production
- Executive producers: Deola Art Alade, Dare Art Alade
- Production location: Lagos, Nigeria
- Camera setup: Multiple
- Production company: Livespot360

Original release
- Network: Showmax (2022-2024); Africa Magic (2025-present)
- Release: 8 April 2022

Related
- The Real Housewives of Johannesburg; The Real Housewives of Cape Town

The Real Housewives of Lagos, abbreviated RHOLagos, is a Nigerian reality television series that premiered on 8 April 2022, on Showmax, starring Carolyna Hutchings, Laura Ikeji, Chioma Ikokwu, Toyin Lawani-Adebayo, Iyabo Ojo, and Mariam Timmer. The show focused on the luxury lives of the Lagos socialites, from shopping sprees, parties, traveling, and competition within their social circles.

The Real Housewives of Lagos is a spin-off from The Real Housewives series franchise and produced by Livespot 360.

== Cast ==
Main cast members
Cast member	Seasons		
Cast member	1	2	3
Laura Ikeji-Kanu	Main	Main	Main
Mariam Timmer	Main	Main	Main
Carolyna Hutchings	Main		Main
Toyin Lawani-Adebayo	Main	Main	
Chioma Ikokwu	Main	Main	
Iyabo Ojo	Main	Main	
Faith Morey		Main	
Tania Omotayo		Main	
Dabota Lawson			Main
Adeola Adeyemi			Main
Sophia Momodu			Main
Friends of the housewives
Rommel Asagwara		Friend	
Vanessa Onyinye		Friend	

== Episodes ==
Season	Episodes	Originally released	
Season	Episodes	First released	Last released
1	14	April 8, 2022	July 8, 2022
2	13	September 29, 2023	March 27, 2024
3	14	January 12, 2025	April 20, 2025

=== Season 1 (2022) ===
Iyabo Ojo, Laura Ikeji-Kanu, Toyin Lawani-Adebayo, Mariam Timmer, Carolyna Hutchings and Chioma Ikokwu are introduced as series regulars.

No. overall	No. in series	Title	Original release date	Viewers (millions)
1	1	"Eko wengele!"	8 April 2022	N/A
Toyin’s daughter, Tiannah, has never met Toyin’s new husband, Segun Wealth. While Iyabo, opens up about being molested at a young age. During lunch, Toyin casually comments, "I think you and Chioma should be friends", to which Laura responds the logic by saying that they are, while Chioma, responded by saying Laura has been a Good Hair client for about six or seven years, as the ladies seem happy about Iyabo’s invitation to the beach, why Laura turns down the invitation.
2	2	"It’s all vibes and Insha Allah"	15 April 2022	N/A
Chioma asks Carolyna what she thought of Toyin’s event, while Laura arrives late at the event. Chioma shares her thoughts about Laura, after seeing her in person looking shy and timid. While Iyabo and her daughter, Priscilla had a chit-chat about her upcoming 21st birthday, as the conversation soon turns to the issue of getting married before 25th.
3	3	"The past comes calling with gbas gbos"	22 April 2022	N/A
From bling shopping, Iyabo invites Laura to a spa session to discuss things over her absence at the beach outing. Following Iyabo's last encounter with Laura, Iyabo expresses her conflict over the meeting, with Chioma. Soon after, Chioma confronts Laura about the statement she made, and Laura is shocked that Iyabo threw her all out on Carolyna.
4	4	"The Real Housewives of Lagos take Abuja"	29 April 2022	N/A
Mariam joined the cast, why Chioma refer to Laura as a "client" and not a friend. While trouble started to cool off between Laura and Carolyna, as she promised to speak to her sister, Linda Ikeji, to take down the stories Carolyna had complained about. Chioma then seized the opportunity to ask Laura to appeal to her sister to also take down the stories she had done on her business partner and BFF, Kika Osunde. Why Iyabo learns to use chopsticks, while Chioma invites the ladies to Abuja for a luxury getaway.
5	5	"Friend or foe?"	6 May 2022	N/A
The ladies continue to live their best lives in Abuja, with Mariam joining the group. As Toyin asks Carolyna during the game of truth or dare, what happened between herself and her ex-husband. Next up, Toyin addresses Laura, saying that she thinks a lot of people misunderstand her, and Carolyna refers to Chioma as her "baby sister".
6	6	"Toyin goes to the zanga"	13 May 2022	N/A
The women come together to support Laura as she launches her new collection. At the event, Laura pulls up in grand style, as she joins Toyin on the party truck while closely guarding her Chanel bag, all through her stay in the ghetto (zanga), just like every true Lagosian knows, you have to shine your eye on the streets of Lagos. Shortly after Chioma and Toyin shade Laura’s collection. Meanwhile, Chioma’s comment, Toyin, who is sitting next to her goes on to show Chioma her pieces while Laura’s show is going on.
7	7	"Chioma and Carolyna arrive 5 hours late for ‘lunch’"	20 May 2022	N/A
Toyin Lawani-Adebayo reveals that she suffered domestic violence in her previous relationship and Laura doesn't see eye to eye with Chioma.
8	8	"Wahala be like bicycle, e no dey hard to start"	27 May 2022	N/A
Following the heated exchange between Carolyna and Laura via WhatsApp over late-coming, Iyabo invites the ladies over for an emergency meeting. Toyin thereafter confronted Laura and Carolyna. As Iyabo started the emergency meeting off by telling Laura, she was also a major latecomer and had no right to complain about Chioma and Carolyna’s lateness. During the meeting, Iyabo goes on to tell Laura that she is one of the major reasons why the meeting is being held because she makes everything about her.
9	9	"Living a soft life, serving killer fashion"	3 June 2022	N/A
Chioma, Mariam, and Toyin meet up for an evening of Paint and Sip, and it’s not long before the ladies recount the events from their last meeting about Laura and Carolyna’s fight. Chioma is interested in want the ladies think of the reconciliation, but Toyin is not having the conversation with her, but rather throwing shades at her saying, "You that sat down there looking plastic. I couldn’t even read your expression," and thereafter added, "You act like it’s a competition,". Meanwhile, Chioma isn’t backing down any time soon on the conversation but rather maintains that she’s a "very confident person and I’m confident enough to know that I stand out all the time.". Iyabo’s daughter Priscilla Ajoke Ojo, who's an actress, model, and social media influencer, had just turned 21 and Iyabo had to throw a huge party for her daughter and invited the ladies, as they turned up for the mother and daughter in true. Laura avoids Carolyna like the plague, and leaves just as soon she’s exchanged pleasantries with everyone and made enough polite chit-chat. Iyabo isn’t sorry to see her go, stating in her diary session that "as usual Laura must always bring drama".
10	10	"The ladies take Dubai"	10 June 2022	N/A
Following the allocation of rooms at the villa, Mariam is unhappy with hers because it's the smallest. Mariam’s also pissed because back in Nigeria, she won a game that entitled her to the biggest room. However, in the spirit of keeping things light-hearted, she’s moved on, but not without a mood swing. The ladies head out to the desert safari, where they had some fun (bike riding and camel riding). Thereafter, they got a party bus, in which Mariam appointed herself the DJ. While Carolyna decides to spray the ladies with some dollars while they dance. Iyabo has us hollering when she presents her booty to Carolyna to be sprayed. Chioma is also twerking up a storm as Carolyna continues to make it rain.
11	11	"Episodes 11"	17 June 2022	N/A
12	12	"It’s the end of the road for Chioma and Carolyna"	24 June 2022	N/A
The ladies get vulnerable as they reach out to their families for emotional support. The ladies decide to lounge by the pool after playing in the water at Toyin's pool party. Mariam reminisces on her early dating days with her husband, and how his persistence eventually won her over, and that of her family's heart. She narrates how her husband snuck his way into her family, and how his unflinching support, while she was admitted for a fibroid surgery, made her realize he was the man for her. Chioma narrates how Carolyna lashed out at Iyabo in tears, who then physically attacked Carolyna, as she tries to step in to prevent Carolyna from being hit, she got shoved aside and sustained some minor bruises.
13	13	"The Reunion Part 1: Here’s all that went down"	1 July 2022	N/A
At the reunion, Uti urged the ladies to give Carolyna a warm welcome. However, Carolyna had the ladies side-eyeing her when she arrived after everyone was sitting down and the show was already in progress. During the season, Chioma is known for coming late to events. At the reunion, while everyone was sitting, Chioma finally arrived, while Uti presented her with a late-coming sash, saying "All hail Chioma, best in lateness." During their conversation with Uti, he brought up the conversation of Laura being pimped to a Nigerian governor. Thereafter, Laura revealed that after the episode aired, she got calls from her in-laws and the village looking to find out what exactly had happened. Carolyna, however, seems to maintain her stance, insisting that the rumor in fact came from Laura’s camp and instead asked Laura to "be careful who you hang out with". Toyin accuses Laura of always playing the victim and acting like all the ladies were ganging up against her. Thereafter, Laura revealed that the ladies hadn’t seen or spoken to each other since the Dubai trip. Suffice it to say, this friendship is in the mud. Still on the friendships in the mud conversation, Carolyna and Toyin undoubtedly delivered some major heated utterances. The issue heated up after Uti asked the ladies to shed some light on their strained relationship even before getting on The Real Housewives of Lagos. From calling each other liars to Carolyna insulting Toyin for being a university dropout and Toyin disrespecting Carolyna about being a fifth wife, therein the ladies dragged each other dirt.
14	14	"The Reunion Part 2: All’s well that ends well … or not?"	8 July 2022	N/A
At the reunion, Uti asked Chioma "what she meant when she said there’s nothing to compete with" in reference to the apparent competition between herself and Toyin. In response, Chioma replied, "I don’t watch what other people are doing, I like to focus on my focus". However, Toyin points out the moment she arrived at Laura’s fashion show and met Chioma there. She pointed out how Chioma deliberately hung back to do her makeup and make a grand entrance. She also quotes Chioma’s previous comments were "watering down her brand" that was her "life’s work". She also disclose, how she once ate bad meat, at Chioma’s establishment but never went public to say it. Expectedly, following the heated words Chioma loses her cool and makes a counter-argument before the ladies get into a shouting match, with Toyin, while they accuse Chioma of being a mean girl, while Chioma accuses Toyin of being jealous and competitive. However, Mariam announced she had a gift for Carolyna, only to return Carolyna's scarf, which she had gifted her, earlier in the season. The backstory of her action was that Chioma had shared some damaging things, Carolyna reportedly about said Mariam with her. According to Mariam, Chioma revealed that Carolyna never wanted to honour Mariam’s dinner invite, and also wanted Chioma to do the same. However, Carolyna had warned Chioma, earlier doing the season to be careful doing her stay at Mariam’s place and only to drink water opened by her or drink whatsoever opened by Mariam in her presence "or else she’s going to use your star because people like them use jazz". Mariam went on to express her hurt at what Chioma had revealed, pointing out that she had never said anything bad about Carolyna during the season. Still, Chioma takes the floor to tell her own side of the story. She pretty much corroborates everything Mariam has said and reveals that she and Carolyna had bonded over the fact that they felt some of the other ladies were razz.

== Production ==
The reality television series was produced by Livespot 360, and distributed by NBCUniversal Formats, a division of Universal Studio Group. On 13 January 2022, Showmax Stories shared a hint about the series, and introduced its cast. On 16 March 2022, the official trailer was released on Showmax YouTube channel. On 29 August 2023, Showmax confirmed Faith Morey and Tania Omotayo to join the main cast in the second season of The Real Housewives of Lagos. On 7 September 2023, Showmax unveiled the official trailer of the second season of the series. On 23 September 2023, a private screening party was held in Lagos ahead of the release of the second season of the series. In December 2024, the cast of the third season was announced, with the series now airing on Africa Magic and with episodes airing next day on Showmax.

== Reception ==
=== Awards and nominations ===
Year	Award	Category	Recipient(s)	Result	Ref.
2022	African Entertainment Awards USA	Best Reality TV Shows	The Real Housewives of Lagos	Nominated	
2023	Africa Magic Viewers' Choice Awards	Best Costume Designer	Adeola Art-Alade	Won	
2023	Africa Magic Viewers' Choice Awards	Best Lighting Designer	Renaldo Van Den Berg, Emmanuel Patrick, David Otuokere	Nominated	
2023	Africa Magic Viewers' Choice Awards	Best Cinematographer	Mex Ossai, Philip Okpokoro, Esmond Igho, KC Obiajulu & Goke Oyerinde	Nominated	
2023	Africa Magic Viewers' Choice Awards	Best Television Series	Adeola Art-Alade & Dare Art Alade	Nominated	
