= Gimme Love (Seyi Shay song) =

2018 song by Seyi Shay

Single by Seyi Shay featuring Runtown
- Released: November 16, 2018
- Recorded: 2018
- Genre: Afrobeats; R&B
- Length: 3:40
- Label: Stargurl
- Songwriters: Oluwaseyi Odedere; Douglas Jack Agu; Michael Elemba
- Producer: Sarz

Seyi Shay singles chronology
"Surrender" (2018)	"Gimme Love" (2018)	"Ko Ma Roll" (2018)

Runtown singles chronology
"No Permission" (2018)	"Gimme Love" (2018)	"Oh Oh Oh" (2018)

"Gimme Love" is a song by Nigerian singer Seyi Shay featuring Runtown, released as a standalone single on November 16, 2018. The song was produced by Sarz. It won the Best R&B Single at The Headies 2019.

== Background and composition ==
According to Seyi Shay, “The whole song was pretty much a freestyle that came from the emotions I was feeling at the time. I just got on the mic and started singing to the beat.”

"Gimme Love" is an Afrobeats-inspired take on R&B and was produced by Sarz. It's sensual without being intense. The lyrics carry passion and urgency.

== Music video ==
An accompanying music video for "Gimme Love" was released on 21 January 2019 and was directed by Clarence Peters.

On 13 September 2019, Seyi Shay released another video of the song, this time featuring Teyana Taylor in a remix. It was shot in Harlem, New York, US and was directed by Walu and produced by JM Films.

== Accolades ==
Year	Award	Category	Result	Ref.
2019	The Headies	Best R&B Single	Won	
