= Cecil Hammond =

Nigerian entertainment executive

- Born: Nigeria
- Occupation: Entertainment executive
- Known for: Founder of Flytime Group, Rhythm Unplugged, Flytime Fest

Cecil Hammond is a Nigerian entertainment executive and the founder of Flytime Group, a Lagos-based media and live entertainment company. He launched Rhythm Unplugged in 2004 and established Flytime Fest, an annual multi-day music festival in Nigeria.

== Early life and education ==
Hammond studied at the University of Leicester, the University of Surrey, and Le Cordon Bleu in the United Kingdom before returning to Nigeria in the early 2000s. He gained industry experience while briefly working with the Silverbird Group, a media company in Lagos, Nigeria.

== Career ==
In 2004, Hammond founded Flytime Promotions (later Flytime Group) to produce quality live entertainment in Nigeria.

Hammond launched Rhythm Unplugged that same year, with the inaugural concert selling out. The concert series gained national attention and has featured artists including Wizkid, Davido, Tiwa Savage, and Burna Boy.

In 2011, Hammond co-signed a contract under Black Diamond Promotions for then-emerging artist Davido. According to The Guardian Nigeria, Davido’s father later bought out the deal so his son would retain full ownership of his music masters.

In 2017, he expanded Rhythm Unplugged into a multi-day festival format known as Flytime Fest, held annually in December in Lagos. The festival has featured performances by international and Nigerian artists.

== Industry influence ==
Flytime Group is credited with raising concert production standards in Nigeria, including the adoption of VIP table seating and high-end audiovisual setups. Hammond has called for stronger creative sector financing.

The company has operates a record label and has produced comedy shows and television programming, including Bovi: Man on Fire and Flytime TV segments.

In 2025, CNN profiled Hammond and Flytime Fest in its African Voices Changemakers series for their contributions to Afrobeats and Nigerian music’s global reach.

Flytime Group was listed among Nigeria's top entertainment companies by TXT Magazine.

== Personal life ==
Hammond is married to Keke Hammond, the Chief Operating Officer of Flytime Group. The couple co-produce Rhythm Unplugged and Flytime Fest. They have three children.

== See also ==
- Music of Nigeria
- Afrobeats
