= The Headies Award for Best R&B Single =

Nigerian music industry award

- Awarded for: Best R&B single in the year under review (by a single individual or group)
- Country: Nigeria
- Presented by: Hip Hop World Magazine
- First award: 2010
- Final award: 2019
- Currently held by: Burna Boy — "For My Hand" (2023)
- Website: theheadies.com

The Headies Award for Best R&B Single is an award presented at the Headies, a ceremony that was established in 2006 and originally called the Hip Hop World Awards. It was first presented to Banky W. in 2010.

== Recipients ==
Best R&B Single
Year	Nominees	Result
2024	"Last Heartbreak Song" by Ayra Starr (featuring Giveon)	Won
2024	"Vision" by Qing Madi	Nominated
2024	"For You" by Johnny Drille	Nominated
2024	"Stranger" by Simi	Nominated
2024	"Burning" by Tems	Nominated
2023	"For My Hand" by Burna Boy (featuring Ed Sheeran)	Won
2023	"Mmadu" by CKay	Nominated
2023	"Just 4 U" by Dami Oniru	Nominated
2023	"Red Wine" by Preye	Nominated
2023	"Hard to Find" by Chike (featuring Flavour)	Nominated
2023	"Loyal" by Simi featuring Fave	Nominated
2022	"Essence" by Wizkid (featuring Tems)	Won
2022	"Baby Riddim" by Fave	Nominated
2022	"Beggie Beggie" by Ayra Starr (featuring CKay)	Nominated
2022	"Running (To You)" by Chike (featuring Simi)	Nominated
2022	"Promise" by Niniola	Nominated
2022	"Sinner" by Adekunle Gold (featuring Lucky Daye)	Nominated
2020	"Tattoo" by Fireboy DML	Won
2020	"Under the Sky" by Praiz	Nominated
2020	"Duduke" by Simi	Nominated
2020	"Mad" by Sarz and Wurld	Nominated
2020	"Bad Influence" by Omah Lay	Nominated
2020	"Dangerous Love" by Tiwa Savage	Nominated
2019	"Gimme Love" by Seyi Shay (featuring Runtown)	Won
2019	"Tipsy" by Odunsi the Engine (featuring Raye)	Nominated
2019	"Serenade " by Funbi	Nominated
2019	"Uyo Meyo" by Teni	Nominated
2019	"Wishes and Butterflies" by Wurld	Nominated
2018	"Smile for Me" by Simi	Won
2018	"Tonight" by Nonso Amadi	Nominated
2018	"Folashade" by Praiz	Nominated
2018	"Let Me Know" by Maleek Berry	Nominated
2018	"Romeo & Juliet" by Johnny Drille	Nominated
2018	"Love You Baby" by Banky W.	Nominated
2016	"Pray for Me" by Darey (featuring Soweto Gospel Choir)	Won
2016	"Love Don't Care" by Simi	Nominated
2016	"Made for You" by Banky W.	Nominated
2016	"Super Woman" by Wande Coal	Nominated
2016	"Aduke" by Tjan	Nominated
2016	"Smile" by Shaydee	Nominated
2015	"Wish Me Well" by Timi Dakolo	Won
2015	"Heartbeat" by Praiz	Nominated
2015	"Baby Daddy" by Iyanya	Nominated
2015	"Say You Love Me" by Leriq (featuring Wizkid)	Nominated
2015	"Do the Right Thing" by Cobhams Asuquo (featuring Bez)	Nominated
2014	"Let Somebody Love You" by 2face Idibia	Won
2014	"Iyawo Mi" by Timi Dakolo	Nominated
2014	"Plan B" by Wande Coal	Nominated
2014	"Don Gorgon" by Burna Boy	Nominated
2013	"Good Good Loving" by Banky W.	Won
2013	"Don't Let Go" by Capital F.E.M.I	Nominated
2013	"Like to Party" by Burna Boy	Nominated
2013	"Rich & Famous" by Praiz	Nominated
2013	"Omote" by Ese Peters	Nominated
2012	"Soundtrack" by May D	Won
2012	"Private Trips" by Wande Coal	Nominated
2012	"That Stupid Song" by Bez (featuring Praiz)	Nominated
2012	"Nawti" by Olu Maintain	Nominated
2012	"Love Me (3x)" by Tiwa Savage	Nominated
2011	"The Way You Are" by Darey	Won
2011	"Only Me" by 2 Face Idibia	Nominated
2011	"I Gat Money" by Capital Femi (featuring Eedris Abdulkareem)	Nominated
2011	"For A Minute" by Waje	Nominated
2011	"Oyi" (Remix) by Flavour (featuring Tiwa Savage)	Nominated
2010	"Strong Ting" by Banky W.	Won
2010	"Never Felt a Love" by Capital Femi	Nominated
2010	"I Love You" by P-Square	Nominated
2010	"No Stars" by Darey	Nominated
2010	"Overkillin" by Djinee	Nominated

== Category records ==
Most wins

Rank	1st	2nd
Artist	Darey; Banky W.	Simi; Timi Dakolo; 2Face Idibia; May D Seyi Shay; Burna Boy
Total wins	2 Wins	1 win

Most nominations

Rank	1st	2nd	3rd
Artist	Banky W.	Darey; Capital Femi; Wande Coal	Timi Dakolo; 2Face Idibia; Simi; Burna Boy; Praiz; Chike
Total noms	4 nominations	3 nominations	2 nominations
