= Diiadem =

Nigerian Television Personality

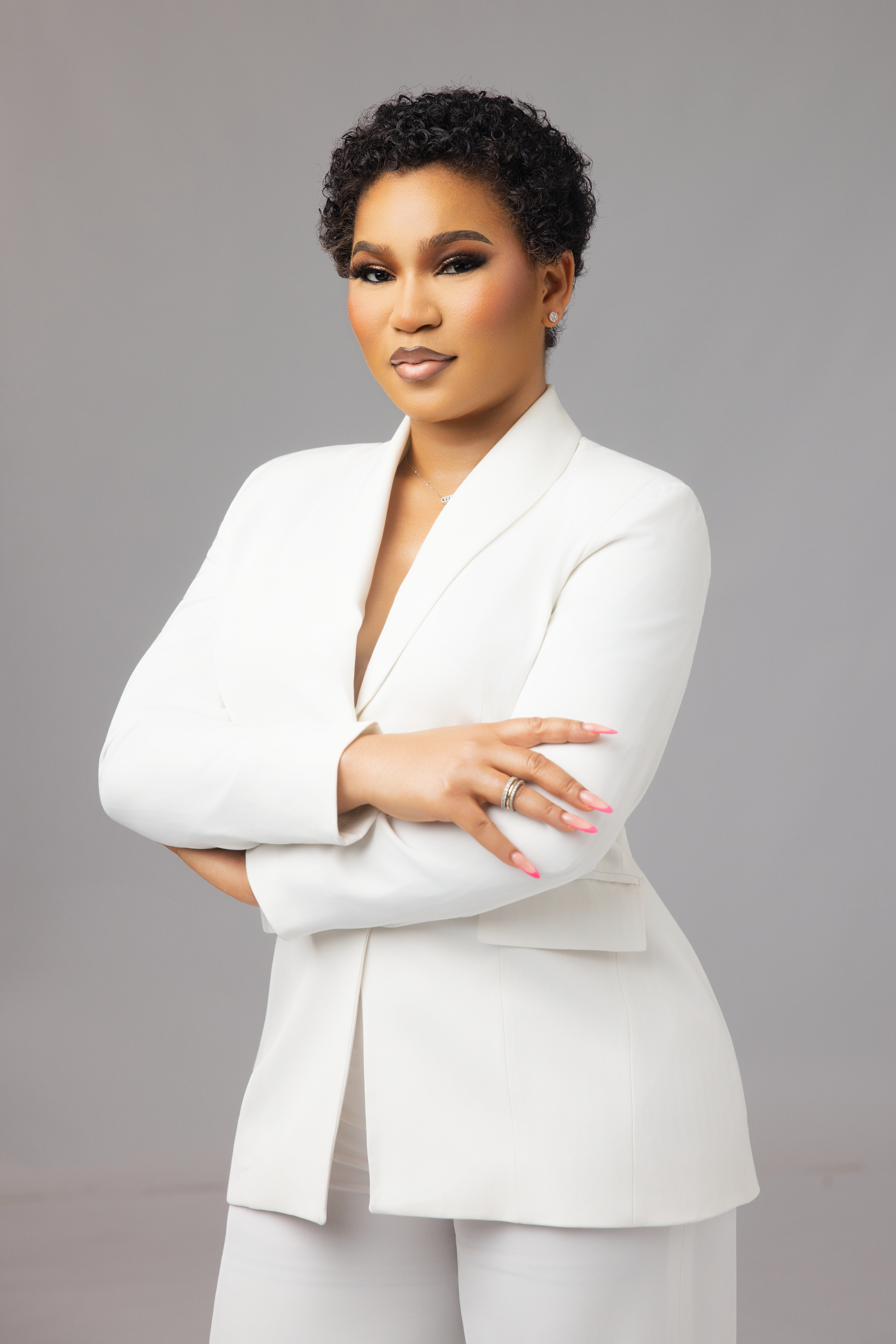
- Adeola "Diiadem" Adeyemi in 2025
- Born: Adeola Chizoba Adeyemi; April 12, 1991 (age 35); Lagos, Nigeria
- Known for: The Real Housewives of Lagos, Beauty by AD

Adeola Chizoba Adeyemi, known professionally as Diiadem, is a Nigerian television personality and businesswoman, who stars in the AMVCA nominated hit TV show The Real Housewives of Lagos. She is also the founder of the makeup brand Beauty by AD.

== Early life and education ==
Diiadem was born in Lagos, Nigeria, on April 12, 1991. She studied at Eben Noble Primary School, Bariga, and Saka Tinubu Memorial High School, Agege, both in Lagos State. She earned her bachelor's degree in Arts at Sikkim Manipal University, Accra, Ghana. She went on to receive formal training as a makeup artist at the Make-Up Designory in California, United States.

== Career ==
Diiadem began her career as a video vixen, model, and content creator.

She founded the cosmetic brand Beauty by AD in 2016. Beauty by AD signed its first ambassador, 43rd Miss Nigeria and reality star, Beauty Tukura in 2022.

=== Content creation and brand influencing ===
In January 2021, Diiadem was unveiled as a brand ambassador for Hush'D Makeover, and later for fashion brand Zeena & Zara in June of the same year. She also appeared as an ambassador for Lush Hair, walking the Lagos Fashion Week runway alongside Denrele Edun, Shaffy Bello and more in 2021.

=== Reality TV ===
In January 2025, Diiadem joined the third season of The Real Housewives of Lagos (RHOLagos). She is known for her style, flambouyant parties and thoughts on getting married, saying, "I'm single and I'm not single, that is, until he puts a ring on it."

=== Feuds ===
In November 2025, Diiadem called out actress Biola Adebayo for being rude and condescending towards her on a movie set in 2009/2010. She claimed Adebayo asked her to clean her shoes in a demeaning manner.

She clashed with RHOL co-star Mariam Timmer during a pajama party hosted by her after Timmer called fellow co-star Carolyna Hutchings against her wishes. Speaking about the incident, she called both Timmer and Hutchings "bullies". Diiadem and Timmer later made up. In August 2026, Diiadem and RHOL co-star Dabota Lawson had a public falling out after Diiadem revealed that Lawson had asked for the return of her N5million birthday gift and had leaked information about her to blogs. Lawson also accused Diiadem of jealous over her recent successes.

=== Magazine covers and features ===
Diiadem was featured as the Cover Star of Exquisite Magazine in April 2022, and La Mode Magazine's 83rd Edition in July 2023.

== Personal life ==
Diiadem is a single parent to her daughter, Akorede (Koko or Koks). She has stated that she left her daughter's father due to domestic abuse while she was pregnant.

== Awards ==
In March 2025, she, alongside fellow Real Housewife, Dabota Lawson, represented the Nigerian Beauty Industry at the United Kingdom House of Lords.
