= Pray for Me (Darey song) =

Single by Darey featuring the Soweto Gospel Choir

from the album Naked
- Released: 7 July 2015
- Recorded: December 2014–March 2015
- Genre: Afro-soul
- Length: 3:55
- Label: Livespot
- Songwriter: Dare Art Alade
- Producer: Oscar Heman-Ackah

Darey singles chronology
| "YOLO" (2014) | "Pray for Me" and "Asiko Laiye" (2015) | "Jah Guide Me" (2020) |

Music video
- "Pray for Me" on YouTube

"Pray for Me" is a song by Nigerian singer Darey, released on 7 July 2015 as one of the dual lead singles from his fourth studio album Naked. It features additional vocals from the Soweto Gospel Choir, and was produced by Oscar Heman-Ackah. The song tells the story of a young man who leaves home against his father's advice, struggles to survive in the city, and asks his parents to pray for him as he tries to find his way.

"Pray for Me" received multiple awards and nominations, including Best Recording of the Year and Best R&B Single at The Headies 2016. At the ceremony, Darey and Oscar Heman-Ackah received nominations for Best Vocal Performance (Male) and Producer of the Year for "Pray for Me" respectively. Darey earned the Best Male Artist (Inspirational) award for the song at the 2015 All Africa Music Awards.

== Background ==
"Pray for Me" was first recorded in December 2014. During a live session in London in February 2015, he listened to it and felt the track needed a choir. He later contacted the Soweto Gospel Choir, and they recorded their parts in March 2015. On 27 March 2015, the Soweto Gospel Choir posted a tweet to confirm the song's existence. Darey explained in an interview with Africa Interviews that the concept of "Pray for Me" was inspired by the story of Nigerian duo P-Square. The producer, Oscar Heman-Ackah, told him about how when P-Square first left Jos to pursue a career in entertainment despite the disapproval of their parents. The story inspired him and led him to write the song.

== Music video ==
The official music video for "Pray for Me" was directed by Mex and shot in Abeokuta, Lagos, and Johannesburg. Starring Olu Jacobs and Joke Silva, the story follows a young man who leaves home to pursue a future in the city and struggles with the challenges he meets there while dealing with his strained relationship with his father. Darey said the idea drew from the experience of Nigerian duo P-Square, and that Jacobs and Silva's appearance in the video "brings the story to life and gives it a whole new level of depth".

=== Reception ===
A review from Soundcity called the video "simply beautiful" and added that it's "so compelling, it will move you to tears". Jim Donnett of tooXclusive said it was "so emotionally entertaining and with a gripping edge" and was as a "strong contender for Video of the Year". Arinze Obikili of Jaguda said that it was "one of the more special videos of 2016 so far". The video went on to receive a nomination for Video Wonder of the Year at the 2016 tooXclusive Awards.

== Critical reception ==
Princess Abumere, writing for Pulse Nigeria, commended the song for Darey's voice and songwriting, stating that it "reminds us why he sits amongst the royalty of the Nigerian R&B kingdom." She concluded that with "Pray for Me", along with "Asiko Laiye", Darey "found a way to connect with lovers of several different genres of music." Oghene Michael of 360nobs described "Pray for Me" as a "renovation of a masterpiece," comparing it to Timi Dakolo's "Wish Me Well" and noting its message about leaving one’s comfort zone and praising the Soweto Gospel Choir for "mak[ing] it an A+ tune."

=== Accolades ===
| Year | Awards ceremony | Award description(s) | Results |
|---|---|---|---|
| 2015 | All Africa Music Awards | Best Male Artist: Inspirational (Darey for "Pray for Me") | Won |
| 2015 | COSON Song Awards | Best Song in Lyrics | Nominated |
| 2015 | The Beatz Awards | Afro Soul Producer of the Year (Oscar Heman-Ackah for "Pray for Me") | Won |
| 2016 | The Headies | Best Recording of the Year | Won |
| 2016 | The Headies | Best R&B Single | Won |
| 2016 | The Headies | Best Vocal Performance: Male (Darey for "Pray for Me") | Nominated |
| 2016 | The Headies | Producer of the Year (Oscar Heman-Ackah for "Pray for Me") | Won |
| 2016 | Soundcity MVP Awards Festival | Video of the Year | Nominated |
| 2016 | tooXclusive Awards | Video Wonder of the Year | Nominated |
| 2016 | The Beatz Awards | Best Mixing & Mastering Engineer (Olaitan Dada for "Pray for Me") | Won |
