= Art Alade =

Nigerian musician

Modupe Arthur Jemi-Alade
- Born: 14 December 1937; Nigeria
- Died: 29 June 1993 (aged 55)
- Other names: Art Alade

Modupe Arthur Afolabi Jemi-Alade (14 December 1937 – 29 June 1993), popularly known as Art Alade, was a Nigerian television personality and producer who was the host of The Bar Beach Show, a weekly variety show on NBC-TV (the Nigerian Broadcasting Company) that aired during the 1970s. He retired from NTA in 1979 as acting Director of Programmes.

After he left NTA, he embarked on a career in music and established a club, Art's Place, where he performed regularly.

== Life ==
Alade was born on 14 December 1937, to the family of Babatunde and Abiodun Jemi-Alade. His father Babatunde was the first Yagba man to become a principal customs officer in Lagos in the early 1920s, and his mother taught music at a girl's only school; she was a granddaughter of Mohammed Shitta Bey. He was married to Olapeju Olufunmilayo Cole, and they had five children.

Alade graduated from C.M.S. Grammar School in Lagos and then traveled abroad to attend Devon Technical College and London School of Television Production in the UK. Alade began his career as a musician on a cruise line, the Greek Line. By 1964, on his return from the UK, he joined the staff of the Nigerian Broadcasting Corporation, now known as NTA.

He compèred the popular Bar Beach Show and hosted the Art Alade Show, the first variety show on network television in Africa. In 1979, he established Arts Place, an entertainment centre comprising a nightclub, restaurant, and art gallery.

Alade was appointed acting Director of Programmes in 1978 and retired a year later.

He is the father of Nigerian multi-platinum and award-winning musician, singer-songwriter, and Idol series judge popularly called Darey.

He died on 29 June 1993, at the age of 55.
