= Laura Ikeji =

Nigerian blogger and entrepreneur

Laura Ikeji-Kanu
- Born: Laura Ikeji; March 15, 1988 (age 38); Lagos State, Nigeria
- Education: Unilag
- Occupations: Blogger, writer, social media expert, entrepreneur
- Years active: 2017–present
- Organization: LauraBeauty store
- Known for: LauraBeauty
- Notable work: How to make money on Instagram
- Spouse: Christopher Kanu (m. 2017)
- Children: 3
- Relatives: Linda Ikeji (sister)
- Website: Laurabeautyshop.com

Laura Ikeji-Kanu (born March 15, 1988) is a Nigerian beauty entrepreneur and one of Nigeria's top fashion and beauty influencers. She is the founder of the cosmetic line LauraBeauty. She starred on the Showmax reality television series The Real Housewives of Lagos. She is the younger sister of Nigerian blogger Linda Ikeji.

== Magazine covers and features ==
On 28 February 2018, she was covered by The Guardian Life Magazine a subsidiary of The Guardian newspaper. Where she discussed about her book "How To Make Money On Instagram". In June 2018 she was featured on Today's Woman Magazine well known as TW Magazine alongside the Nigerian actress Omoni Oboli.

In 2017 she was featured on Complete Sports on a list featuring entertainment celebrities related to former or active footballers.

== 2017–present ==
=== Endorsement deal ===
In May 2017, Nigerian hair brand BK Unique Hair Inc signed Ikeji as brand ambassador alongside Rita Dominic. In January 2018, the online store and sponsor of Big Brother Naija season 2 and 3 Payporte signed Ikeji as brand ambassador. In July 2018, Gtex homes signed Ikeji as brand ambassador alongside Mercy Aigbe Gentry.

=== Incomplete ===
On 4 July 2018, Ikeji launched her perfume fragrance Incomplete, which was sold out before the release date after she announced the pre-order sales.

== Personal life ==
Ikeji is married to Christopher Kanu. The couple had their court wedding on 19 January 2017, in Lagos State, Nigeria. Their traditional marriage was held in her hometown in Nkwerre LGA, Imo state on 28 January 2017. In July 2017, the couple welcomed their first child together, Ryan Kanu, in Texas, United States of America.

On 15 March 2018, she celebrated her birthday with a brand new Mercedes-Benz.

== Career and Interests ==
In addition to her successful career in fashion and social media, Laura Ikeji has expressed a passion for interior design. In 2024, she visited Mayluv World, a luxury home decor showroom in Lagos, where she highlighted her love for elegant and functional home furnishings. The visit was documented on her social media platforms, showcasing her enthusiasm for the quality and craftsmanship of the products available there.

== Honours ==
The ECOWAS Female Parliamentarians Association (ECOFEPA) on Monday, May 21, 2018, in Abuja, honour Nigeria's vice president, Professor Yemi Osinbajo, business magnate, Alhaji Aliko Dangote alongside Davido, Don Jazzy, Ikeji and others.

== Filmography ==
=== Film and television ===
Film
Year	Title	Role	Notes
2015	Undercover Lover	Barbara	Main role
2019	Sugar Rush	Laura Ikeji	Guest Role
Television
Year	Title	Role	Notes
2022	The Real Housewives of Lagos	Laura Ikeji	Main role
