= Boat Regatta =

Nigerian boat festival

Boat Regatta festival
- Language: Igbo

Origin
- Meaning: Local Wrestling
- Region of origin: Niger Delta region, Nigeria

The Boat Regatta is a festival celebrated by the riverine people of the Niger Delta region in Nigeria. The festival is celebrated by people from Rivers State, Akwa Ibom State, Bayelsa State, and Cross River State.

The festival is always staged when the water level is high and during the rainy season to ensure that boats can float with the high wave of the water. Boats are decorated in beautiful colours, with their occupants also dressed in native attire, to showcase the aquatic culture of the people.

== Activities ==
The festival is celebrated by the riverine people in the Niger delta region and is a time of showcasing aquatic culture in the communities. These participants appear in beautifully adorned native wear and use it to showcase the communities defence mechanism before colonization, ceremonies and their religion.

Besides dressing in beautiful local wrappers and outfits, other aspects of the festival includes the shooting of canons on boats and masquerade performances to thrill the crowd at the event.

Recently in Rivers State, Governor Nyesom Wike declared that the festival should be celebrated annually on May 27 to mark the creation of Rivers State and also to showcase the culture and traditions of the people of Rivers State.

== See also ==
Henley Royal Regatta
