= Rhythm Unplugged =

Music festival

- Location: Lagos, Ibadan, Benin City, Port Harcourt, Abuja
- Dates: Every Year, December
- Attendance: 5000

Rhythm Unplugged is annual music concert in Nigeria, West Africa. CEO of the Flytime Group, Cecil Hammond, organised the first concert in 2004. The concert features a lineup of Afrobeats, Hip-Hop, and RnB artists from within and outside Nigeria. It is organised by Flytime Promotions, a subsidiary of the Flytime Group.

The 2024 edition marked its 20th anniversary and was headlined by American rapper Gunna. Other performers were Burna Boy, BNXN, Fireboy DML, Shallipopi, and Tyla.

The 2011 Lagos edition of Rhythm Unplugged unveiled artists including Wizkid, Olamide, Davido, Tiwa Savage and Seyi Shay.

== History ==
Rhythm Unplugged was first organised by Cecil Hammond in 2004 via his company Flytime Promotions. The entertainment event was designed to promote Nigerian musicians and comedians at a time when the Nigerian music industry was just gaining recognition on the international music scene.

Rhythm Unplugged concerts featured dialoguing co-hosts, notably, co-hosts Julius Agwu and Okey Bakassi, who hosted several Flytime Promotions events in the early years. Rhythm Unplugged also pioneered the extensive artist line-up for single concert events in Nigeria.

=== Conception ===
The first Rhythm Unplugged concert was held in 2004 at Fantasyland in Ikoyi, Lagos and tickets sold out.

Following the success of the first Rhythm Unplugged concert, Flytime Promotions announced that it would host the concert annually at a larger venue in order to accommodate the growing fan base. In years since, Rhythm Unplugged has been hosted at the Federal Palace Hotel, the Ocean View and, most recently, at the Eko Convention Center all in Victoria Island, Lagos.

== Locations ==
The concerts have taken place in multiple cities across Nigeria, including Benin, Abuja, Port Harcourt, Jos, and Ibadan. There have been over 40 editions of Rhythm Unplugged since 2004 in various cities, however, the primary concert is still held in Lagos, at the Eko Convention center.

In 2010, Rhythm Unplugged was hosted in Benin City. It was the first Rhythm Unplugged concert hosted outside of Lagos.

In 2011 a Rhythm Unplugged concert was held in Abuja. The 2011 Lagos edition of Rhythm Unplugged unveiled artists including Wizkid, Olamide, Davido, Tiwa Savage, and Seyi Shay.

In 2012, two Rhythm Unplugged concerts were held outside Lagos. The first concert was held in Port Harcourt, Rivers State and featured the popular singer from Rivers State, Duncan Mighty. The second concert was held in Ibadan, Oyo State and featured performances from Wizkid, Davido, 2Baba and Olamide.

In 2013, Rhythm Unplugged was held in Lagos and featured major international and domestic acts including Wyclef, P-Square, Burna Boy and Olamide. This edition of the concert was sponsored by Harp Lager and was branded Harp Rhythm Unplugged.

The 2014 edition of Rhythm Unplugged marked its 10th anniversary and featured P-Square, Davido, Mavin All Stars, Olamide, MI, Patoranking, Waje, Yemi Alade, Seyi Shay, Skales, Runtown, Bovi, Julius Agwu, Okey Bakassi, I Go Dye and Akpororo. It was Flytime Promotions' largest and most well-attended Rhythm Unplugged.

Also, in 2014, Pepsi became the major corporate sponsor of Rhythm Unplugged, and the concert was correspondingly named Pepsi Rhythm Unplugged. Pepsi remains the concert's major corporate sponsor, and subsequent editions of Rhythm Unplugged maintain the Pepsi prefix.

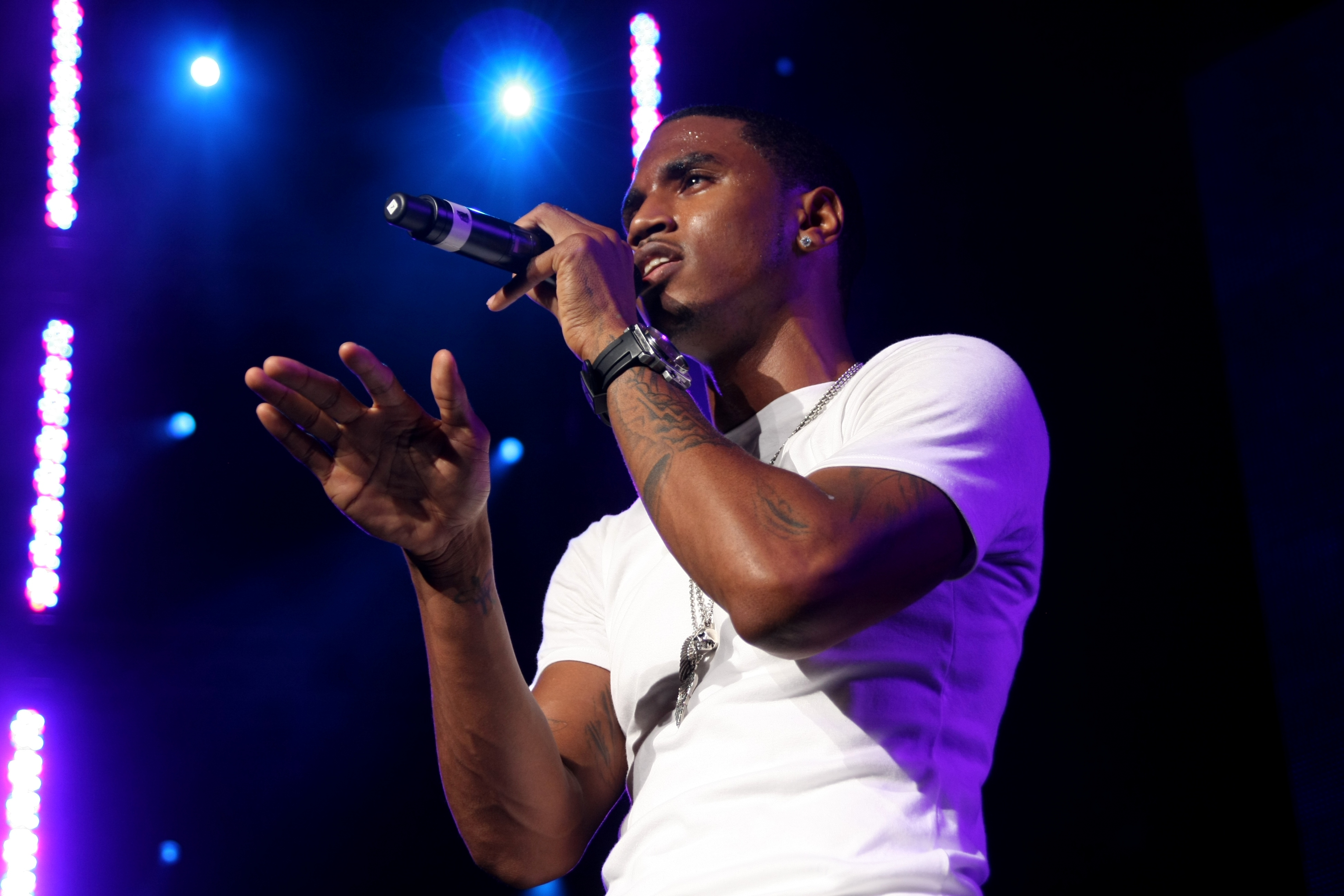
Trey Songz performing at the 2015 Rhythm Unplugged

The 2015 edition of Rhythm Unplugged was hosted in Lagos and featured the American Musician, Trey Songz, as the headline act.

Seyi Shay, Falz, Olamide, Omawumi, Kiss Daniel, Korede Bello, Reekado Banks, Koker, DJ Obi, DJ Exclusive, and Cobhams performed at the 2016 edition of Rhythm Unplugged held in Lagos.

In 2017 Rhythm Unplugged was held as part of a two-day Music and Comedy festival. The first day of the concert hosted the Rhythm Unplugged Concert, which featured performances by Big Shaq, Davido, Tiwa Savage, Wande Coal, Simi, Runtown, Olamide, Ycee, Niniola, Small Doctor, Mayokun, 9ice, Nonso Amadi.

The second day of the concert hosted Wizkid The Concert. Davido made an appearance during this concert and, for the first time, Davido and Wizkid performed together. By sharing a stage, the two artists signaled an end to a year-long feud.

The 2018 edition of Rhythm Unplugged was held as part of a three-day long music festival names Flytime Festival. Rhythm Unplugged was featured on the first day of the festival, and was headlined by Davido, Tiwa Savage, D'Banj, Burna Boy, Duncan Mighty and DJ Cuppy.

The 2019 edition of Rhythm Unplugged was a toast to the 15th year Anniversary of outstanding and exceptional concert by Flytime. It was the opening day of a five-day concert held by Flytime Promotions and featured performances by various musical artists and DJs. Some of the artists in attendance included Olamide, MI, Ycee, Patoranking, Mayorkun, Teni, Zlatan, Joeboy, Fireboy, B Red, Tolani, Jeff Akoh, Oluwadamilola, DJ Neptune, DJ Consequence, DJ Obi, DJ Cuppy and many others as Burna Boy starts the show on the 20. The venue remained Eko-Convention center, Victoria Island. Lagos.

The 2020 edition did not take place due to COVID-19 restrictions.

The 2022 edition of Rhythm Unplugged took place on December 21 at Eko Convention Center, and it was a collaboration between Flytime Promotions and Pepsi. An event featuring a slew of artists. Craig David, a 41-year-old British singer-songwriter, joined Wande Coal, Reekado Banks, Fave, Pheelz, BNXN, Zinoleesky, and others on stage.

The 2023 edition of Rhythm Unplugged took place on December 21, 2023, at the Eko Convention Centre in Lagos, Nigeria. The event was headlined by American rapper Roddy Ricch and featured performances from Nigerian artists such as Fireboy DML, Iyanya, Ajebo Hustlers, BNXN, Fave, Mayorkun, Spyro, Wurld, Bloody Civilian, Blaqbonez, Raybekah, Seyi Vibez, Shallipopi, Smada, and Victony. Afrobeats singer Tiwa Savage also made an appearance during the event.

The 2024 edition of Rhythm Unplugged, marking its 20th anniversary, took place on December 22 at the Eko Convention Center. The concert was headlined by American rapper Gunna, performing live in Africa for the first time. South African singer Tyla joined Gunna on stage for a performance of their song Jump. Other performers included Nigerian artists Ayo Maff, Burna Boy, BNXN, Choc Boiz, D'Banj, Fireboy DML, Shallipopi, Qing Madi, and Zerry DL.

The 2025 edition of Rhythm Unplugged was held on 21 December 2025 at the Eko Convention Centre in Lagos, Nigeria. The concert was headlined by Nigerian singer-songwriter Rema, with a special guest appearance by British rapper Central Cee.

The event also featured performances by Nigerian artists including Odumodublvck, Shallipopi, BNXN, Fola, Mavo, Shoday, Zerry DL, Blnde, Chella, and Smada.
