= Toyin Ajayi =

Physician and CEO

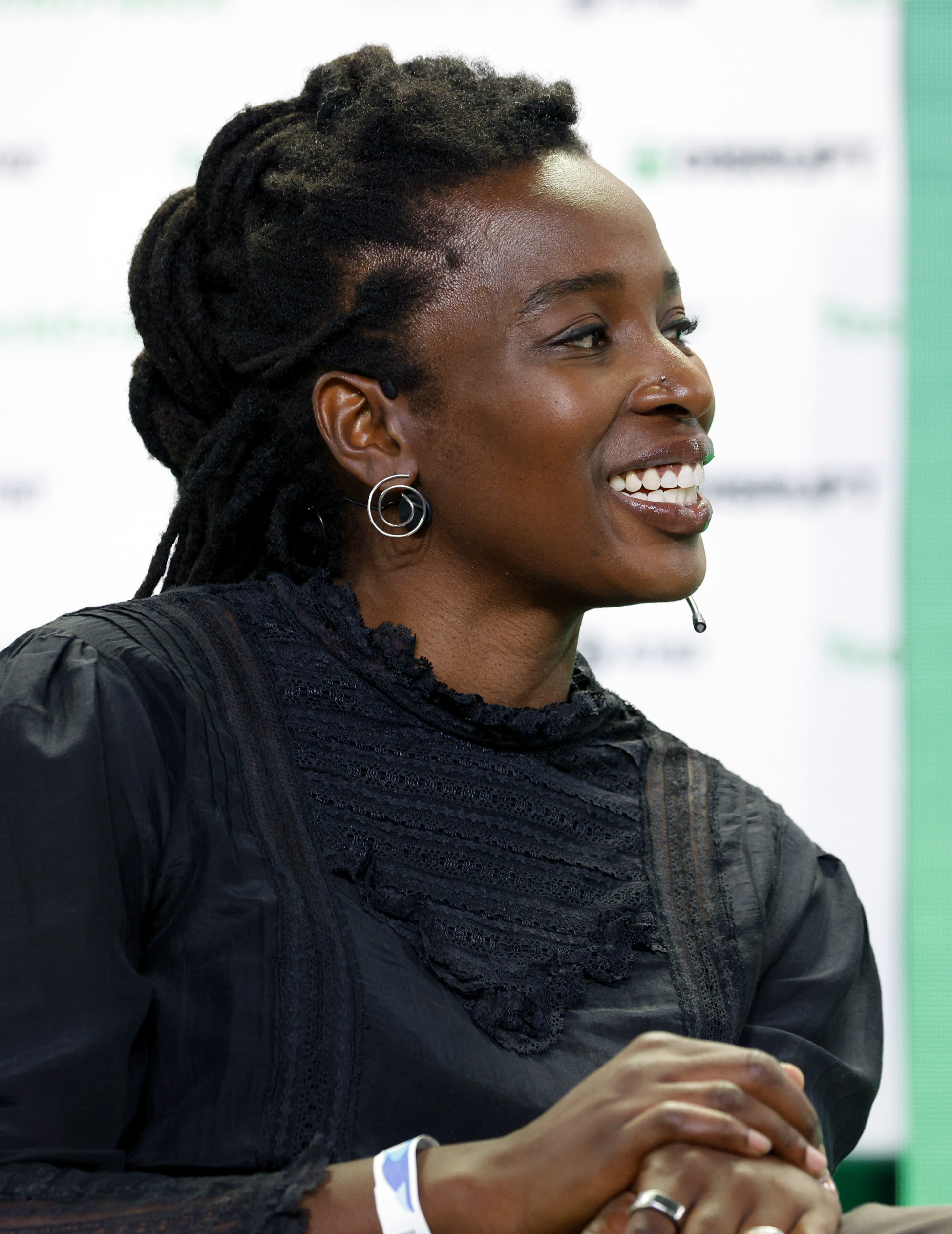
- Toyin Ajayi at TechCrunch Disrupt 2022
- Born: Boston, United States of America
- Education: Stanford University (BS); University of Cambridge (MPhil); King's College London School of Medicine (MD)
- Occupations: Physician, CEO
- Known for: Co-founder and CEO of Cityblock Health

Toyin Ajayi is a physician, co-founder, and CEO of Cityblock Health, a primary health care provider that focuses on underserved populations who rely on Medicare and Medicaid in the United States.

== Early life and education ==
Born to Nigerian parents, Ajayi grew up in Nairobi, Kenya. Her father was a physician during the AIDS epidemic who worked to improve maternal health.

Ajayi earned her bachelor's degree in human biology from Stanford University. She earned her master's from the University of Cambridge, and was later awarded her medical degree from King's College London School of Medicine. In 2009, Ajayi started a non-profit focusing on improving health care conditions in Freetown, the capital city of Sierra Leone, one of only 50 doctors in a county of 7 million people. Ajayi was able to improve relationships between the community and the hospital and says she realized where her ambitions really lay: "I wanted to build systems to... train dozens of doctors." She turned her focus to family medicine, "believing it would provide her with the most varied tool set". She completed her medical residency at the Boston Medical Center.

== Career ==
Ajayi was the Chief Medical Officer at Commonwealth Care Alliance, a health and service provider. In this role, Ajayi oversaw clinical services and delivery while continuing to see patients as a practicing physician.

In 2017, Ajayi co-founded Cityblock Health with Iyah Romm, with Ajayi serving as company president and Romm as the CEO. Cityblock Health was spun out of Sidewalk Labs, a Google backed business incubator. In 2022, Ajayi took over as CEO when Romm stepped down. Ajayi was cited for helping Cityblock grow from a startup company to being valued close to $6 billion.

Ajayi references the COVID-19 pandemic as a driver for the need for community-based healthcare: “It’s unacceptable in 2022 that we’re looking at exactly the same data that we were looking at 15 years ago about healthcare disparities, healthcare outcomes, all exacerbated by COVID."

Ajayi cites patient interaction as providing key insight into developing the best procedures to help with patient problems. Ajayi also cites trust-building as important when working with disadvantaged communities: "[Trust] is disproportionately lower amongst communities of color, low-income folks, folks with mental health needs. We knew that we had to start with building trust, because that's the only way you get people to engage with you in order to change behaviors."

== Other activities ==
Ajayi was a board member for the Boston Area Rape Crisis Center (BARCC) from 2017 through 2019.

== Awards and honors ==
- In 2021, Ajayi was named as one of Entrepreneur Magazine's 100 Women of Impact
- In 2023, Ajayi was recognized on Time Magazine's TIME100 Next list which recognizes rising leaders across multiple fields
- In 2023, the Black Business Ventures Association (BBVA) named Ajayi on their Founding 50 list which highlights top-performing Black founders in the tech industry
- In 2023, Ajayi was named as one of Modern Healthcare's Women to Watch
- In 2024, she was elected a Member of the National Academy of Medicine.
