= Urban FM =

Radio station

Urban FM is an alternative radio station which broadcasts 24 hours from Pristina, Kosovo on FM frequency 103.5. Besides its normal activity as a radio station, Urban FM has taken part in various social awareness campaigns that were held in Kosovo.
