= Ilubirin Estate =

Public housing project in Lagos, Nigeria

Ilubirin Estate is a public foreshore housing project being built on reclaimed land in Ikoyi Island, Lagos at the foot of the Third Mainland Bridge, facing the Lagos Lagoon waterfront on Lagos Island.

== Overview ==
The housing project was initiated by Lagos State Government in partnership with First Investment Property Company through a Public Private Partnership (PPP). The initial design proposal was approved by the Lagos State Ministry of Housing through the Lagos Home Ownership and Mortgage Scheme (LAGOSHOMS). The first phase of Ilubirin was scheduled to be completed in 2019. Ilubirin was initially modelled after Ikoyi Foreshore Estate, Ikoyi, Lagos and has now been remodelled from a purely residential into a mixed-use development of residential, commercial and leisure areas.

The residential block prototypes that will be completed in the phases are a mixture of 126m^{2} of 2 bedroom flats; 183m^{2} of 3 bedroom flats and 76m^{2} of 1 bedroom flats.

The project site area is approximately 15.1 hectares. Ilubirin aims to combine the benefits of affordable housing with mid-market luxury.

The Lagos State Government was criticized for evicting some of the local residents who lived in proximity to the construction site.
