= Chioma Goodhair =

Nigerian (born 1989)

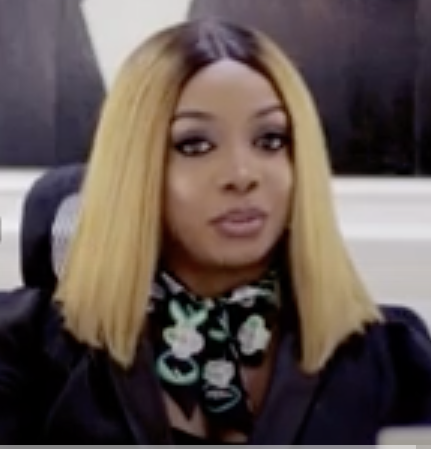
- Born: Chioma Ikokwu; June 25, 1989 (age 36); Lagos, Nigeria
- Education: University of Birmingham
- Known for: Co-founding Good Hair.

Chioma Ikokwu, (born June 26, 1989) better known as Chioma Goodhair, is a Nigerian entrepreneur executive coach and fashion icon. She is a co-founder and the CEO of Good Hair Ltd. and Brass and Copper Restaurant & Lounge, alongside Kika Osunde. She is also known for her role in the Real Housewives of Lagos (RHOL) reality show within The Real Housewives franchise.

== Early life and education ==
Chioma Ikokwu was born in Lagos, Nigeria, to Agunze and Uche Ikokwu. She graduated from the University of Birmingham in 2010 with an LL.B degree. She later earned an LL.M degree in International Environmental Law and International Commercial Arbitration at the University of London (School of Oriental and African Studies).

== Career ==
She met her business partner Kika Osunde at the University of Birmingham. After completing her Master of Laws degree, Chioma briefly worked at a law and arbitration firm in Lebanon before returning to Nigeria to attend law school.

She co-founded the hair and beauty brand Good Hair Ltd in England in 2009, which moved to Nigeria in 2014. Ikokwu and Osunde built a beauty hub known as "The Good Hair Space." Chioma Goodhair is part-owner of Brass and Copper, a restaurant and bar in the Good Hair Space in Lekki, Lagos.

She founded the Chioma Ikokwu Start-up Fund Initiative, which focuses on providing capital for small businesses with innovative ideas. She also runs an executive coaching program where she mentors entrepreneurs in business creation, branding, and marketing.
