= Livespot X Festival =

Music festival

- Genre: Rock, pop, Afrobeat
- Dates: December
- Locations: Nigeria, Ghana
- Years active: 2019–present
- Founders: Deola Art Alade
- Organiser: Livespot 360
- Website: livespotnation.com/index.php

The Livespot X Festival is a music concert that launched in 2019 with its maiden edition in Lagos, Nigeria and Accra, Ghana organized by Livespot360.

Livespot X Festival featured a fusion of live performances; music, lighting, special acts.

== 2019 ==
The main show features a line-up of African acts from numerous countries, including Nigeria, US. The 2019 edition of Livespot X Festival unveiled artists including Cardi B, Teni, Burnaboy, Tiwa Savage, Seyi Shay, Joeboy, Ice Prince, DJ Cuppy, Reekado Banks, and Patoranking which was held in Lagos and Ghana.

== 2020 ==
The 2020 edition unveiled artists including Darey, Yemi Alade, Simi, DJ Cuppy, Joeboy, Mayorkun in the first-ever live hybrid concert in Nigeria on 19 and 20 December and was set to feature Burna Boy and Wizkid as the first time the duo will be on stage. On 15 December 2020 the management announced the cancellation due to an increased spike of COVID-19 cases in Lagos, Nigeria.

== 2021 ==
The 2021 edition was announced on 13 November 2021 set to run from 16th to 21st December 2021 at Livespot360 ultra-innovative arena which will feature tailor-made concerts and multi-sensory experiences for attendees including live performances by various artists and special acts.
