= Ekunrawo =

Russian-Nigerian musician

- Born: Adeleke Timileyin Tunde
- Genres: Afrobeat; dancehall; Hip hop

Adeleke Timileyin Tunde known professionally as Ekunrawo is a Russian-Nigerian Afrobeat musician and model.

== Early life and career ==
Tunde was born in Nigeria but migrated to Russia to further his education at Volgograd State University of Architecture and Civil Engineering where he graduated as an architect and civil engineer.

== Career ==
Ekunrawo began his music career in Lagos and released his first single "Shoma" in 2018, and his first music video was shot for his single "ЭтоМеждуНами" (English: "This is between us"). Ekunrawo described his music as Afrobeat mixed with hip hop and dancehall. In 2023, Ekunrawo released a 6-track debut extended play, Show Some Love.

== Discography ==
Single

- "Shoma"
- "This is between us"
- "Sweet Love"
- "I Got You"
- "Show Some Love"
- "See You See Me"
- "For My Head"
- "Fear"

Extended plays

- Show Some Love (2023)
