= Șèyí =

Nigerian singer and actress

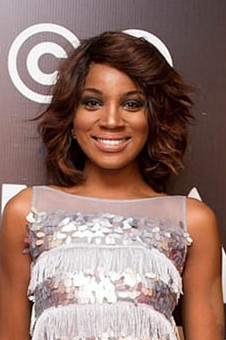
- Șèyí at the 2014 Africa Magic Viewers' Choice Awards
- Born: Oluwaseyi Joshua; December 21, 1985 (age 40); Tottenham, London, UK
- Education: University of East London
- Occupations: Singer; songwriter; actress
- Years active: 2001–present (Note: Șèyí told The Punch's Kemi Lawal that she became a professional singer at age 14.)
- Children: 1
- Musical career
- Genres: Afropop; R&B; afro-soul; reggae; dancehall
- Instrument: Vocals
- Labels: Stargurl; UMPG France
- Formerly of: From Above

Deborah Oluwaseyi Joshua (born 21 December 1985), known professionally as Șèyí (formerly Seyi Shay), is a Nigerian singer, songwriter and actress. She was a member of From Above, a now-defunct girl group that was previously signed to Columbia Records and managed by Mathew Knowles. Șèyí relocated to Nigeria after the group disbanded in 2011, and signed a record deal with Flytime Music. She released her debut studio album, Seyi or Shay, in November 2015. It was supported by several singles, including "Murda", "Crazy", "Jangilova", and "Right Now". In January 2021, Șèyí signed a publishing deal with the French division of Universal Music Publishing Group. Her second studio album, Big Girl, was released on 10 December 2021.

== Life and career ==
=== 1985–2010: Early life, career beginnings, and Flytime ===
Oluwaseyi Joshua was born and raised in Tottenham, England, to Nigerian parents. Her mother, who is now deceased, was a chorister and her father is a native of Ife. Șèyí has an elder sister and two older brothers; her sister composed songs for the BBC and one of her brothers was a club and radio disc jockey. She and her siblings were raised by their single mother. Șèyí grew up in a Christian home and often felt like a loner during her adolescence. She started visiting Nigeria when she was two years old and eventually attended the Command High School in Maryland, Lagos. She returned to London and performed with the London Community Gospel Choir during their world tour, which included 13 cities in Japan. She studied music business management at the University of East London and graduated with a bachelor's degree with honours. In an interview with This Day's Lanre Odukoya, Șèyí said her mother wanted her to become a doctor or lawyer and wasn't a staunch supporter of her musical ambitions. Her mother eventually told her to focus on her music career and put God first.

Șèyí's music career took an upswing when she signed her first ever recording contract with No Apologies, a record company affiliated with George Martin, who was commonly referred to as the "fifth Beatle". In 2006, Șèyí formed a girl band in the UK called Boadicea; they were managed by Ron Tom, the founder and manager of All Saints and Sugababes. When Boadicea broke up after two years, Șèyí made the decision to try out for the From Above singing competition. The audition led to her joining From Above. The group signed a record deal with Mathew Knowles' Music World Entertainment Corporation after performing for him, and were taken to Houston to undergo energetic vocal and dance trainings. They supported Beyoncé while she was in the United Kingdom for her I Am... World Tour. From Above presented the Best New Act award to Bruno Mars at the 2011 MTV Europe Music Awards and had their own reality show called Breaking From Above, which aired in over 166 countries around the world. Șèyí had the opportunity to continue her management deal with Mathew Knowles and secure a contract with Sony despite the group's disbandment.

Șèyí has worked with a number of musicians, including Justin Timberlake, Brian Michael Cox, Darey, Bilal, Michelle Williams, Chip, Rob Knoxx, Harmony Samuels, and Cameron Wallace. She wrote and produced three songs for the soundtrack to Konami's video game Crime Life: Gang Wars (2005). She also wrote "You Will See", a song that appeared on Melanie C's third studio album Beautiful Intentions (2005). Furthermore, she composed the song "White Lies" from Chip's album Transition (2011). Șèyí was introduced to Sound Sultan during his visit to London in 2011. After listening to some of her demos, Sultan convinced her to relocate to Nigeria and pursue a music career there. Șèyí was also introduced to Cecil Hammond, who signed her to his record label, Flytime Music, and launched her solo career in Nigeria. In 2013, Șèyí left Flytime Music and told Vanguard that she joined the label to promote her brand and still has a good relationship with people at the label. She also said that while signed to the label, she was very much in control of her brand.

=== 2011–2013: Seyi or Shay and notable performances ===
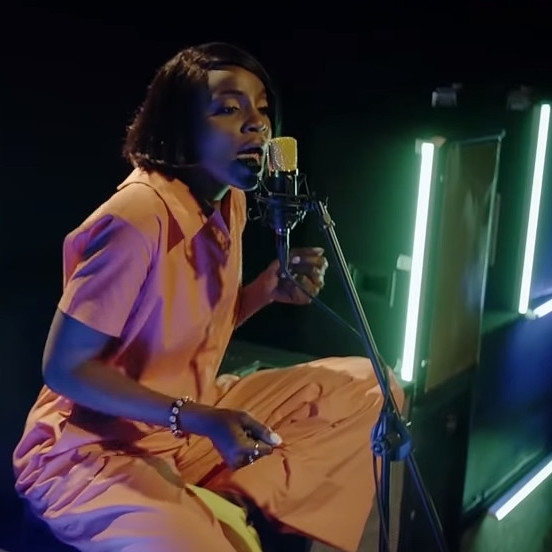
Seyi performing for Ndani Sessions in October 2018

On 11 August 2011, Șèyí released "Loving Your Way" and "No Le Le", two promotional singles that helped launch her music career in Nigeria. In 2012, she started recording her debut studio album, Seyi or Shay, and worked with producers such as Jay Sleek, Tee-Y Mix, Del B and Cobhams Asuquo. On 27 July 2012, Șèyí released the single "Irawo", which was produced by Del B and originally titled "Erawo". The remix of "Irawo" includes a rap verse by Vector and was released on 6 December 2012. Șèyí said she wrote "Irawo" to inspire her colleagues and workmates to pull together. The song's music video was directed by Clarence Peters and uploaded to YouTube on 3 June 2013.

Șèyí performed at the 2013 COSON Song Awards. In May 2013, she told Odukoya that she recorded a song with Olamide and said the rapper's work ethic made working with him simple. Written solely by Olamide, the track was scheduled for release in 2014. Șèyí has been featured on songs released by several artists, including Praiz, Mr. Walz, Yung Grey C, and Amir. In July 2013, she performed at one of Big Brother Africa 8's live eviction shows, and played at the 2013 edition of Star Music Trek in Asaba that same month. In August 2013, she released the single "Killin' Me Softly", which features vocals by Timaya and was written and produced by Del B. In an interview with Vanguard's Kehinde Ajose, Șèyí said she felt in love with the song when she first heard it and reached out to Timaya for a verse because she wanted a different vibe on the song.

On 27 September 2013, Șèyí performed at the Sisters with Soul concert, which was headlined by Mary J. Blige. The following month, she released the Del B-produced singles "Ragga Ragga" and "Chairman". The latter track features vocals by Kcee, who was present during the song's composition. Prior to releasing the two singles, Șèyí signed a partnership deal with the talent company J-Management. In November 2013, she signed an endorsement deal with Etisalat. That same month, she and Wale performed "Bad" at the Johnnie Walker Step Up to VIP Lifestyle Launch event. Șèyí was a supporting act on the 2013 Hennessy Artistry 2013 Club Tour. In December 2013, she gave a performance at the Harp Rhythm Unplugged concert.

=== 2014–2019: Electric Package, Vol. 1 and concert residency ===
On 8 January 2014, Șèyí released the music video for "Ragga Ragga", which was filmed in Lagos and directed by Peters. The following month, she performed at Darey's Love Like a Movie concert, which featured additional performances from Kelly Rowland, D'banj, and Tiwa Savage, among others. "Ragga Ragga" peaked at number 7 on MTV Base's Official Naija Top 10 chart for the week of 15 March through 19 March 2014. On 1 April, Șèyí released the Dokta Frabz-produced single "Murda", which features additional vocals by Patoranking and Shaydee. In a review for Jaguda, music critic Arinze Obikili awarded the song a rating of 9 out of 10, commending Șèyí for using a familiar line. The music video for "Murda" was directed by Meji Alabi and uploaded to Vevo on 11 May 2014. Șèyí inked a recording contract with Island Records in July 2015, and signed a two-year endorsement deal with Pepsi that same year. She released her debut studio album, Seyi or Shay, in November 2015.

In an April 2016 interview with Nancy Isime on HipTV's Trending, Șèyí erroneously stated that EP is an acronym for "Electric Package". She trended on Twitter and footage of the mistake went viral online. Prior to this, Șèyí pronounced "Two" as "Tuwo" while speaking to Chuey Chu on Pulse TV. On 22 April 2016, she released the music video for the song "Pack and Go", which features Olamide and appeared on Seyi or Shay. On 10 January 2017, Șèyí released the single "Yolo Yolo", which was produced by DJ Coublon. The song's music video was directed by Meji Alabi and released two months later. It was nominated for Best Music Video at The Headies 2018. "Yolo Yolo" appeared in a Baileys commercial that aired in Sub-Saharan Africa. Șèyí released her debut Extended Play (EP), Electric Package, Vol. 1, on 29 May 2018, along with a documentary. The title alludes to the blunder she made when referring to EP as "Electric Package" on Trending. The EP is composed of six tracks and marks Șèyí's first project in three years. A mixture of Afrobeats and gqom, Electric Package, Vol. 1 features collaborations with Kizz Daniel, Flavour, King Promise, Vanessa Mdee, DJ Spinall, DJ Cuppy, Anatii, DJ Consequence, and Slimcase. Production was handled by Killertunes, DJ Coublon, Krizz Beat, Lush Beat, Anatii, and Chopstix.

Șèyí announced on Instagram that she was awarded a concert residency at the Canary Wharf in London. The two-night event was held on 29 and 30 May 2019. That same year, Șèyí released the Runtown-assisted track "Gimme Love", which won Best R&B Single at The Headies 2019. She also released the remix of "Gimme Love", which features vocals by Teyana Taylor.

=== 2020–present: Nigerian Idol, publishing deal, rift with Tiwa Savage, and Big Girl ===
In June 2020, Șèyí signed a management deal with Aristokrat Records. In May of the same year, she inked a publishing deal with Universal Music Publishing Group and Aristokrat Publishing. On 2 February 2021, MultiChoice Nigeria appointed Șèyí to serve as judge on the sixth season of Nigerian Idol. During the show's audition, Șèyí was criticized for comments she made about Mayowa "Tohrus" Odueyungbo, who was one of the contestants. On 29 March 2021, television host Frank Edoho criticized all of the judges for their remarks. Șèyí responded to the criticism on Twitter, saying: "I'm feeling like #JudgeJudy right now. You either love her or you hate her, and that's quite alright! either way, thanks for the #1 trend". In June 2021, Șèyí engaged in a minor dispute with Tiwa Savage at an upscale salon in Lekki. A few years prior to the confrontation, Savage downplayed Șèyí's endorsement deal with Pepsi after being asked in a radio interview to share her thoughts about the announcement. Șèyí released her own version of Kizz Daniel's "Fvck You" challenge, in which she made a number of disparaging terms and accused Savage of "selling pussy".

Șèyí released her second studio album, Big Girl, on 10 December 2021. It comprises ten tracks and features guest appearances from Calema, Simi, Wande Coal, Yemi Alade, and Backroad Gee. Șèyí described the album as "a documentation of the experiences, growth and evolution that I've undergone in the last five years". In October 2025, Șèyí revealed that her former PA had an affair with Savage's ex husband Tunji Balogun, and believed that it was the root cause of the rift. Șèyí said Savage was convinced that she was aware of the affair and was encouraging it.

== Artistry and role models ==
Although her musical style is primarily a combination of Afropop and R&B, Șèyí doesn't conform to a particular genre of music. She has stated that her music draws from things that inspire her. Șèyí has cited her mother, Mathew Knowles, 2face Idibia, Beyoncé, Tina Turner, Sound Sultan, Wizkid, and Omawumi as mentors.

== Personal life ==
Șèyí has a daughter who was born on 16 April 2022. She and her daughter appeared in public for the first time on 4 December 2022.

== Discography ==
Studio albums

- Seyi or Shay (2015)
- Big Girl (2021)

EPs

- Electric Package, Vol. 1 (2018)
- Feels Like Home, Vol. 1 (2023)
- Feels Like Home, Vol. 2 (2023)

=== Selected singles ===
As lead artist
Year	Title	Album
2011	"Loving Your Way"	Non-album single
2011	"No Le Le"	Non-album single
2012	"Irawo"	Non-album single
2012	"Irawo" (Remix) (featuring Vector)	Non-album single
2013	"Chante" (featuring Ajuju)	Non-album single
2013	"Killin' Me Softly" (featuring Timaya)	Non-album single
2013	"Chairman" (featuring Kcee)	Non-album single
2013	"Ragga Ragga"	Non-album single
2014	"Murda" (featuring Patoranking and Shaydee)	Seyi or Shay
2015	"Crazy" (featuring Wizkid )	Seyi or Shay
2015	"Jangilova"	Seyi or Shay
2015	"Right Now"	Seyi or Shay
2016	"Pack and Go" (featuring Olamide)	Seyi or Shay
2018	"Ko Ma Roll" (featuring Harmonize)	Non-album single
2019	"Gimme Love (Remix)" (with Teyana Taylor)	Non-album single
As featured artist
Year	Title	Album
2013	"For You" (Praiz featuring Seyi Shay)	Non-album single
2013	"Paradise" (Mr Walz featuring Seyi Shay)	Walz Have Ears
2013	"Get Down" (Yung GreyC featuring Seyi Shay)	Non-album single
2013	"Yarinya" (Amir featuring Seyi Shay)	Non-album single
2014	"In Love" (Wizkid featuring Seyi Shay)	Ayo
2015	"Sugar" (Ayoola featuring Seyi Shay)	Non-album single
2015	"The Motion" (DJ Lambo featuring Seyi Shay, Cynthia Morgan & Eva Alordiah)	Non-album single
2016	"Only You (Remix)" (Nikki Laoye featuring Seyi Shay)	Non-album single
2017	"Celebrate" (NC Dread featuring Seyi Shay)	Non-album single
2018	"Yalla Habibi" (Ragheb Alama featuring Seyi Shay and Costi Ioniță)	Non-album single
2018	"Bia"	Electric Package
2018	"Alele" (featuring DJ Consequence and Flavour N'abania)	Electric Package
2020	"By Gones" (Navio featuring Seyi Shay and Sheila Way)	Strength in Numbers

=== Selected videography ===
Year	Title	Director	Ref
2014	"Murda" (featuring Patoranking and Shaydee)	Meji Alabi	
2015	"Right Now"	Meji Alabi	
2017	"Bia"	Clarence Peters	
2017	"Weekend Vibes" (Remix) (featuring Sarkodie)	Moe Musa	
2017	"Your Matter" (featuring Eugy and Efosa)	Meji Alabi	
2018	"Surrender" (featuring Kizz Daniel)	Clarence Peters	
2019	"Ko Ma Roll" (featuring Harmonize)	Cardoso Imagery	
2019	"Gimme Love" (featuring Runtown)	Clarence Peters	

== Filmography ==
Year	Title	Role	Notes
2018	Lara and the Beat	Lara	

== Awards and nominations ==
Year	Event	Prize	Recipient	Result	Ref
2013	The Headies	Best Vocal Performance (Female)	"Irawo"	Nominated	
2013	The Headies	Next Rated	Herself	Nominated	
2013	City People Entertainment Awards	Best New Musician of the Year (Female)	Herself	Won	
2013	Nigeria Entertainment Awards	Best New Act of the Year	Herself	Nominated	
2013	Chase Awards	Artiste of the Year (Female)	Herself	—N/a	
2013	Chase Awards	Song of the Year	"Irawo"	—N/a	
2014	2014 Channel O Music Video Awards	Most Gifted Female	"Irawo"	Nominated	
2014	City People Entertainment Awards	Musician of the Year (Female)	Herself	Nominated	
2014	2014 Nigeria Entertainment Awards	Female Artist of the Year	Herself	Nominated	
2014	World Music Awards	World's Best Song	"Ragga Ragga"	Nominated	
2014	World Music Awards	World's Best Video	"Ragga Ragga"	Nominated	
2014	World Music Awards	World's Best Female Artiste	Herself	Nominated	
2014	World Music Awards	World's Best Live Act	Herself	Nominated	
2014	World Music Awards	World's Best Entertainer of the Year	Herself	Nominated	
2015	MTV Africa Music Awards 2015	Best Female & Video of the Year	TBA	Nominated	
2019	The Headies	Best R&B Single	"Gimme Love"	Won	
2021	Net Honours	Most Popular Musician	Herself	Nominated	
2021	Net Honours	Most Searched Musician (female)	Herself	Nominated	
