= Darey =

Nigerian musician

Darey a.k.a. Dare Art Alade
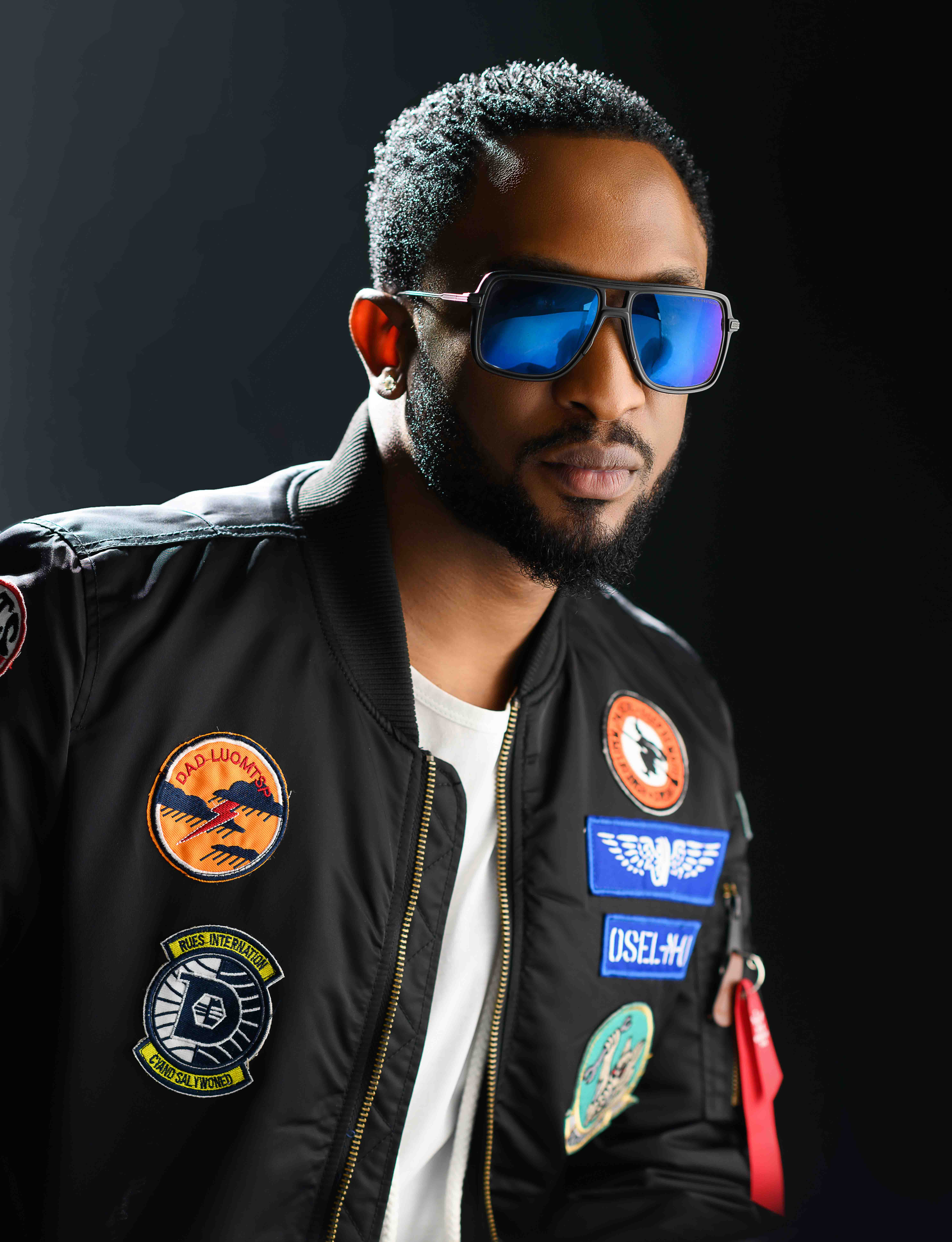
- Darey

Background information
- Born: Oluwadamilare Babatunde Art Alade; February 9, 1982 (age 44)
- Origin: Lagos, Lagos State, Nigeria
- Genres: Afro & B, Afrobeats, R&B
- Occupation: Singer-songwriter
- Years active: 2004–present
- Label: Livespot Entertainment
- Spouse: Deola Art Alade
- Website: www.dareynow.com

Oluwadamilare Babatunde Art Alade (born 9 February 1982), known professionally as Darey, formerly Dare Art Alade, is a Nigerian multi-platinum Afro R&B singer, songwriter, record producer, philanthropist, humanitarian and entrepreneur. He is also the son of the African jazz musician and entertainer Art Alade and the creative director of Livespot360.

== Early life ==
Darey (pronounced Da-Ray) Art Alade was born in Lagos, but originally from Odo ogga, Yagba west, Kogi state to Nigerian jazz pioneer Art Alade and Olapeju Alade. He is the youngest of five children. As a child, he used to rummage through his father's extensive jazz collection and go with him to his concerts.

Darey sang with several choirs, including the National Troupe of Nigeria Choir and the Cathedral Choir. From the age 15, he began performing in clubs around Lagos, Ibadan and other cities in Nigeria. It was during one of those late night sessions that he met an executive at Cool FM, a Radio station. The teenager began shuttling between Cool FM and the University of Lagos, where he was studying for a degree in music, and sang with the a cappella group The Chordwebs. During his time at Cool FM, he learned about radio production and marketing.

== Career ==
Darey has also worked as a radio and TV personality, appearing as a coach, judge and host on several TV shows, including Project Fame West Africa, Nigerian Idol, and The Voice Nigeria. He is also a master of ceremonies, voiceover artist and philanthropist.

Darey is the co-founder of Livespot360, a creative agency. Under his creative direction, Livespot360 has organised several concerts and festivals in Nigeria, which have featured appearances from African and international artists including Grammy award winners Kelly Rowland, Ciara, Cardi B and Kim Kardashian.

=== 2004–06: Project Fame ===
Darey came third in the 2004 edition of Project Fame Academy.

=== 2006–07: From Me 2 U ===
After a record deal with Sony BMG Africa, his debut album From Me 2 U was launched on Storm Records. It included singles such as "Fuji" and "Escalade" which enjoyed airplay in the Nigerian and international media. The album also included the song, "Original Naija" which was used as the theme song for the first ever edition of Big Brother Nigeria. Darey's album, From Me 2 U won several awards including the Awards for Musical excellence in Nigeria (A.M.E.N) and the 2006 Channel O Music Video Awards for best R&B Video in Africa.

=== 2008: Project Fame West Africa ===
In 2008, Darey spent several months as the host of a music based reality show Project Fame West Africa.

=== 2009: unDAREYted ===
Two years after the release of his debut album, Darey released his follow up entitled unDAREYted, on the new start up label, Soul Muzik. The album sold over 150,000 copies across Nigeria in just two months. The album features appearances by Darey's contemporaries and friends: Cobhams Asuquo (Aṣa's producer), 2face Idibia, Naeto C, 9ice, Tee-Y Mix and the up-and-coming R&B crooner, Pheel, to mention a few. The work features the smash hit ballad "Not The Girl," which has been nominated for several awards and won video of the year at the 2009 Nigerian Entertainment Awards held in Washington DC.

unDAREYted caught the attention of Dick Griffey, who is credited with discovering and influencing the music careers of artists such as Shalamar, The Whispers, Babyface, L.A. Reid and Dr. Dre. Dick Griffey offered to executive-produce Darey's third album which was to break Darey further into the U.S and international markets but Griffey died before the project could be completed.

=== 2010–2015: Double Dare ===
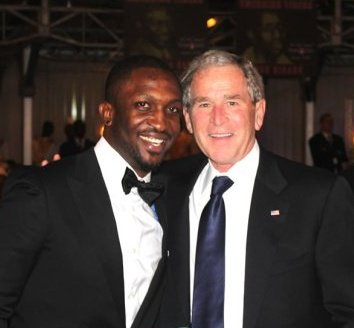
Darey with U.S. President George W. Bush while hosting the ThisDay Awards in Abuja, Nigeria

In 2010, Darey performed at shows in many cities across the World including Nairobi, Johannesburg, Abuja, Lagos and other major African cities, including a special concert with R&B legend R. Kelly in South Africa and the This Day Peace Concert Tour in the Niger Delta region of Nigeria, which had 50 Cent and Ciara as headliners. On request of the President of Nigeria, Goodluck Ebele Jonathan, he was invited to perform at the presidential villa in a dinner to commemorate the country's 50th independence anniversary. At the event, which was broadcast live to over 200 million viewers across the world, he performed a medley of 50 songs with his 15-piece band, "Soul band" to a room of African presidents and past world leaders.

Darey was the main host of both the Gulder Ultimate Search and Glo Naija Sings reality shows in 2011. In February 2013, he put together, alongside his Soul Muzik team, one of the biggest shows Nigeria has ever seen, Darey Presents: Love Like A Movie, which had the red carpet hosted by Kim Kardashian, as well as the release of the music video, "Asiko" featuring Jozi and Ice Prince.

In May 2013, Darey released a single, "Special Fever", produced by Harmony Samuels. In June 2013, he co-hosted the launch of Mo Abudu's multi-broadcast network Ebony Life TV alongside Dolapo Oni. He also signed on as an ambassador to Unilever's popular beverage, Lipton.

Darey also became a judge on Nigerian Idol, replacing Jeffrey Daniel.

=== 2013-2016: Darey Presents Love Like A Movie ===
Love Like A Movie is a concert for Valentines Day held annually by Darey.

The first edition of the show was held in 2013. The show was tagged "The Flight of Love" and featured a special appearance from American reality TV star Kim Kardashian.

The second edition of Love Like A Movie was held in 2014. and featured a special performance by Kelly Rowland.

The third edition of Love Like A Movie was held in 2016 and featured Ciara as a guest artist and performer.

=== 2015: Naked ===
In October 2015, Darey released his fifth studio album titled Naked. The 13-track album made up of afrobeat, soul and R&B features collaborations with Asa, YBNL Nation rapper Olamide and multiple Grammy award-winning Soweto Gospel Choir. Ten of the thirteen songs on the album were produced by Oscar Heman-Ackah, with additional production contributions from Cobhams Asuquo, Vtek and Dare himself.

=== 2018-2019: BAFEST ===
Darey served as the creative director and also performed at the second biggest festival in Nigeria BAFEST (Born in Africa Festival) in December 2018 and 2019.

=== 2019: Livespot X Festival ===
Darey performed at the Livespot X Festival (produced by Livespot 360) which was held in December 2019 across two African cities Lagos and Accra with Grammy Award winner Cardi B as headline act. The first ever Livespot X Festival in Lagos was the biggest concert in Nigeria with over 60,000 people in attendance. Along with creative directing, hosting and performing at the festival, Darey also immersed Cardi B in Nigerian pop culture, showing her around and also paying a philanthropic visit to an orphanage. During her visit, Cardi B adopted a Nigerian name "Chioma" and called herself "Chioma B" on social media.

=== Jah Guide Me ===
After being away for nearly five years as an active musician, on 14 August 2020, Darey returned with a gospel-esque single titled "Jah Guide Me". The song was accompanied by an Afro-futuristic video. Darey described "Jah Guide Me" as the beginning of a deeply African-rooted story.

== Discography ==
=== Albums ===
- From Me 2 U (2006)
- unDAREYted (2009)
- Double Dare (2011)
- Naked (2015)
- Way Home (2020)

=== Singles ===
- "Escalade" (2006)
- "Fuji" (2006)
- "With This Woman" (2008)
- "Carry Dey Go" (featuring 2Face Idibia) (2008)
- "Not The Girl" (2008)
- "More" (2009)
- "No Stars" (2009)
- "Let You Know" (2009)
- "Style Na Style" Remix ft. 9ice, Password & Jesse Jagz (2009)
- "Stroke Me" (2009)
- "The Way You Are" (2010)
- "Don't Let Me Know" (2010)
- "Ba Ni Ki Di" (2010)
- "Sisi Eko" (2010)
- "The Way You Are" (Remix) ft Chamillionaire (2011)
- "Special Fever" (2013)
- "Asiko Laiye" (Remix) ft Olamide (2015)
- "Pray For Me" ft Soweto Gospel Choir (2015)
- "Jah Guide Me" (2020)

== Awards ==
Won

- Best Male Video "Not The Girl" (2009 Channel O Music Video Awards)
- Best R&B Video "Not The Girl" (2009 Channel O Music Video Awards)
- Best R&B "Not The Girl" (2009 Nigerian Music Video Awards)
- Best Use of Costume "More" (2009 Nigerian Music Video Awards)
- Video of the Year "More" (2009 Nigerian Music Video Awards)
- Best Music Video of the Year "Not The Girl" (2009 Nigeria Entertainment Awards)
- Best R&B Video "Escalade" (2006 Channel O Music Video Awards)
- Best Picture / Musical Video "Escalade" (Awards for Musical excellence in Nigeria (A.M.E.N))
- Recording of the Year "The Way You Are" (The Headies 2011)
- Best R&B Single of the Year "The Way You Are" (The Headies 2011)
- Best Male Artiste: Inspirational "Pray For Me" (All Africa Music Award 2015)

Nominated

- Best R&B (2009 MTV Music Video Awards)
- Best R&B Song "Escalade" (2007 Awards for Musical excellence in Nigeria (A.M.E.N))
- Best R&B Album "From Me 2 U" (Awards for Musical excellence in Nigeria (A.M.E.N))
- Best Single Recording "Not The Girl" (2009 Hip Hop World Awards)
- Best Vocal Performance – Male "Not The Girl" (2009 Hip Hop World Awards)
- Best Afro Pop Video "Ba Ni Ki Di" (2011 Nigerian Music Video Awards)
- Best RnB Video "The Way You Are" (2011 Nigerian Music Video Awards)
- Video of the year "The Way You Are" (2011 Nigerian Music Video Awards)
- Best Use of Costumes "Ba Ni Ki Di" (2011 Nigerian Music Video Awards)
- Artist of the Year (The Headies 2011)
- Best R&B Pop Album – Double Dare (2011 The Headies)
- Best Vocal Performance (2011 The Headies)
- Most Stylish Artist – Male (FAB Awards 2012)
- Best Use of Costumes "Sisi Eko" (2012 Nigerian Music Video Awards)
- Best Highlife "Sisi Eko" (2012 Nigerian Music Video Awards)
- Music Video of the Year "Sisi Eko" (2013 Nigerian Entertainment Awards)
- Best Male Artiste in West Africa "Special Fever" (2014 All Africa Music Awards)
- Best Male Artiste: Inspirational "Pray For Me" (2015 All Africa Music Awards)

== Personal life ==
He is married to Nigerian entrepreneur, media personality, and cultural curator Deola Art Alade. Together, they collaborate on creative and entrepreneurial ventures, particularly through Livespot360.

== See also ==
- African hip hop
- Nigerian hip hop
- R&B
- Soul music
