= Runtown discography =

- Studio albums: 1
- Singles: 17
- Music videos: 10

Nigerian recording artist Runtown has released one studio album, seventeen singles and ten music videos. His debut single was released in 2007 as an upcoming artist. He shot to limelight in 2014 upon the release of "Gallardo", a song which features vocals from Davido and was released as the first single off his debut studio album Ghetto University. Gallardo went on to win "Best Collaboration of the Year" at the 2014 edition of the Nigeria Entertainment Awards. On 23 November 2015, Runtown released his debut studio album titled Ghetto University via MTN Music Plus through Eric Many Entertainment. The album generated over ₦35million on the music portal thus earning him a spot in the list of "Top 5 Most Streamed Artist".

== Studio albums ==
List of studio albums, with selected chart positions
Title	Album details	Peak chart positions						Certifications	Sales
Title	Album details	NGR	RSA	GHA	SWE	UK	US	Certifications	Sales
Ghetto University	Released: November 23, 2015; Label: Eric Many Entertainment; Format: CD, digital download	—	—	—	—	—	—		
"—" denotes a recording that did not chart or was not released in that territory.

== Singles ==
=== As lead artist ===
List of singles as lead artist, with selected chart positions and certifications, showing year released and album name
Title	Year	Peak chart positions							Certifications	Album
Title	Year	NGA	GHA	RSA	AUS	UK	US	US R&B/HH	Certifications	Album
"Runtown"	2007	—	—	—	—	—	—	—		Non-album singles
"Are You Not Entertained?"	2007	—	—	—	—	—	—	—		Non-album singles
"Party Like It's 1980"	2008	—	—	—	—	—	—	—		Non-album singles
"Activity Pikin"	2008	—	—	—	—	—	—	—		Non-album singles
"Forever"	2010	—	—	—	—	—	—	—		Non-album singles
"Aunty Tolu" (featuring Timaya)	2012	—	—	—	—	—	—	—		Non-album singles
"The Control"	2013	—	—	—	—	—	—	—		Non-album singles
"High On You" (featuring Laza Morgan)	2013	—	—	—	—	—	—	—		Non-album singles
"Gallardo" (featuring Davido)	2014	—	—	—	—	—	—	—		Ghetto University
"Successful"	2014	—	—	—	—	—	—	—		Non-album singles
"Domot"	2014	—	—	—	—	—	—	—		Non-album singles
"Baby Answer"	2014	—	—	—	—	—	—	—		Non-album singles
"My Matter" (featuring Timaya)	2014	—	—	—	—	—	—	—		Non-album singles
"The Banger" (featuring Uhuru)	2014	—	—	—	—	—	—	—		Ghetto University
"The Latest"	2015	—	—	—	—	—	—	—		Non-album single
"Bend Down Pause" (featuring Wizkid)	2015	—	—	—	—	—	—	—		Ghetto University
"Walahi"	2015	—	—	—	—	—	—	—		Ghetto University
"Lagos to Kampala" (featuring Wizkid)	2015	—	—	—	—	—	—	—		Ghetto University
"Mad Over You"	2016	—	—	—	—	—	—	—		Non-album singles
"For Life"	2017	—	—	—	—	—	—	—		Non-album singles
“Body Riddim” ft. Darkovibes, Bella Shmurda"	2020	—	—	—	—	—	—	—		Non-album singles
"—" denotes a recording that did not chart or was not released in that territory.

=== As featured artist ===
Said

By Nasty C ft. Runtown 2017

== Music videos ==
- "Gallardo" (2014)
- "The Banger" (2015)
- "Lagos to Kampala" (2016)
- "Mad Over You" (2016)
- "For Life" (2017)
- "Energy" (2017)
- "Unleash" (2018)
