= 9th Headies Awards =

Nigerian music industry awards

The Headies 2014
- Date: 14 December 2014
- Location: Eko Hotel and Suites; Victoria Island, Lagos
- Country: Nigeria
- Hosted by: Toke Makinwa and Basketmouth
- Most awards: Olamide, Patoranking, Davido (2 each)
- Most nominations: Olamide, Kcee, Phyno (5 each)
- Website: theheadies.com

Television/radio coverage
- Network: HipTV

The Headies 2014 was the ninth edition of The Headies. It took place on 14 December 2014, at the Eko Hotel and Suites in Victoria Island, Lagos. Themed "Feel the Passion", the show was hosted by Toke Makinwa and Basketmouth. It was initially scheduled to hold on 25 October 2014. Bovi was initially announced as one of the hosts, but ended up not hosting due to him being booked for another show. On 30 September 2014, nominations were announced during a press briefing at the HipTV office in Allen, Lagos. Kcee, Olamide and Phyno led the nominations with five each. Tiwa Savage, Oritse Femi and The Mavins followed closely with four apiece. Yemi Alade was nominated for Song of the Year, Best Pop Single and Next Rated. Olamide, Patoranking and Davido each took home two awards apiece. Don Jazzy won the Producer of the Year plaque, while Sir Victor Uwaifo received the Hall of Fame recognition.

== Performers ==
- Nikki Laoye
- Cynthia Morgan
- Yemi Alade
- Davido
- Dr SID
- Patoranking
- Timi Dakolo
- P-Square
- Sir Victor Uwaifo
- Skales

== Winners and nominees ==
Best R&B/Pop Album	Best R&B Single
The Journey – Sean Tizzle; Take Over – KCee; Once Upon a Time – Tiwa Savage; Me, My Mouth & Eye – Sound Sultan; L.I.F.E - Leaving an Impact for Eternity – Burna Boy	"Let Somebody Love You" – 2face Idibia; "Iyawo Mi" – Timi Dakolo; "Plan B" – Wande Coal; "Don Gorgon" – Burna Boy
Best Vocal Performance (Male)	Best Vocal Performance (Female)
"Iyawo Mi" – Timi Dakolo; "Double Wahala" – Oritse Femi; "Why You Love Me" – Nosa; "Ordinary People" – Cobhams Asuquo	"Love to Love You" – Niyola (featuring Banky W.); "Wanted" – Tiwa Savage; "Window" – Monica Ogah; "Good Man" – Ruby Gyang
Next Rated	Hip Hop World Revelation of the Year
Patoranking; Runtown; Orezi; Skales; Yemi Alade	Take Over – KCee; Once Upon a Time – Tiwa Savage; The Journey – Sean Tizzle; L.I.F.E - Leaving an Impact for Eternity – Burna Boy
Best Recording	Producer of the Year
"Ordinary People" – Cobhams Asuquo; "Iyawo Mi" – Timi Dakolo; "Let Somebody Love You" – 2face Idibia; "Why You Love Me" – Nosa	Don Jazzy for "Dorobucci"; Pheelz for "Eleda Mi O"; T-Spize for "Aye"; Legendury Beatz for "Caro"; Shizzi for "Skelewu"; Del B for "Pull Over"
Best Collabo	Best Music Video
"Emergency" – WizzyPro (featuring Skales, Patoranking and Runtown); "Oya Now" – Joe EL (featuring Oritse Femi); "Surulere" – Dr SID (featuring Don Jazzy); "Pass You By" – Black Magic (featuring Oritse Femi); "Girlie O" (Remix) – Patoranking (featuring Tiwa Savage); "Dorobucci" – The Mavins	"Ada Ada" by Flavour N'abania – Clarence Peters; "Toh Bad" by Niyola – Kemi Adetiba; "Just Like That" by Rayce – Aje Filmworks; "Oya Now" by Joe EL (featuring Oritse Femi) – Unlimited L.A; "Personally" by P-Square – Jude Engees Okoye and Clarence Peters
Best Pop Single	Best Reggae/Dancehall Single
"Dorobucci" – The Mavins; "Aye" – Davido; "Johnny" – Yemi Alade; "Pull Over" – KCee (featuring Wizkid); "Double Wahala" – Oritse Femi; "Caro" – Starboy (featuring L.A.X and Wizkid); "Surulere" – Dr SID (featuring L.A.X and Don Jazzy)	"Girlie O" (Remix) – Patoranking (featuring Tiwa Savage); "Lead Me On" – Cynthia Morgan; "Stinking Shit" – Chopstix (featuring Ice Prince, Yung L and Endia); "Bad Girl" – Jesse Jagz (featuring Wizkid); "Murda" – Seyi Shay (featuring Patoranking and Shaydee)
Best Rap Album	Best Rap Single
Baddest Guy Ever Liveth – Olamide; No Guts No Glory – Phyno; Alaga Ibile – Reminisce; Jagz Nation, Vol.1. Thy Nation Come – Jesse Jagz	"Parcel" – Phyno; "Dope Money" – Olamide (featuring Phyno); "Shots on Shots" – Ice Prince and Sarkodie; "Rap It Up" – Posly TD; "Deaf" – Eva Alordiah; "WTF"- Illbliss
Lyricist on the Roll	Best Street-Hop Artiste
Jesse Jagz – "God on the Mic"; Ice Prince and Sarkodie – "Shots on Shots"; Posly TD – "Rap It Up"; Yung6ix – "Kpansh"	Oritse Femi – "Double Wahala"; Lil Kesh – "Shoki"; The Mavins – "Dorobucci"; Phyno – "Alobam"
Best Alternative Song	Album of the Year
"BOTM" – BOJ; "Body" – Black Magic (featuring Banky W.); "Good Man" – Ruby Gyang (featuring BOJ and POE); "Why You Love Me" – Nosa	Baddest Guy Ever Liveth – Olamide; The Journey – Sean Tizzle; L.I.F.E - Leaving an Impact for Eternity – Burna Boy; No Guts No Glory – Phyno
Song of the Year	Artiste of the Year
"Aye" – Davido; "Double Wahala" – Oritse Femi; "Surulere" – Dr SID (featuring Don Jazzy); "Dorobucci" – The Mavins; "Johnny" – Yemi Alade	Davido; Wizkid; KCee; Tiwa Savage; Olamide; Phyno; Flavour
African Artiste of the Year	Hall of Fame
(Ghana) Sarkodie; (South Africa) Mafikizolo; (Tanzania) Diamond Platnumz; (Ghana) R2Bees	Victor Uwaifo
