= KCee discography =

Artist discography

Kcee discography
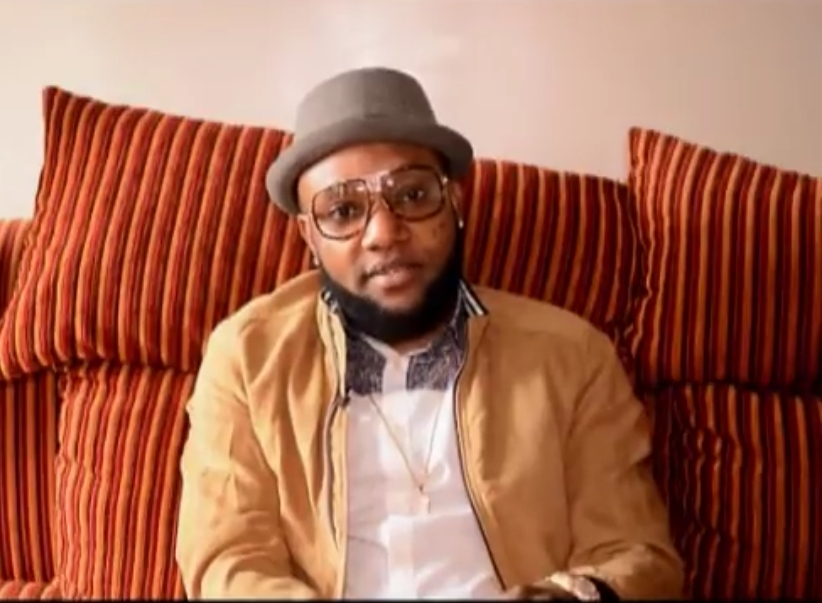
- Studio albums: 4
- EPs: 1
- Singles: 96
- Music videos: 35
- Promotional singles: 5

The discography of Kcee consists of four studio albums, one collaborative EP, seventy-one singles (including eleven as featured artist), five promotional singles, and sixty-nine music videos (including nine as featured artist). Kcee began his music career as part of the duo KC Presh, who gained national attention after winning the Star Quest talent show in 2002. The pair enjoyed moderate success before going their separate ways in 2011.

Kcee launched his solo career shortly after, achieving a major breakthrough with his 2013 hit single "Limpopo", produced by Del B. That same year, he released his debut solo studio album Take Over, which spawned several successful singles including "Give it to Me", "Okoso", and "Pullover", and featured appearances from D’banj, Don Jazzy, Davido, Wizkid, and others. His second album Attention to Detail was released in 2017, followed by Eastern Conference in 2019. In 2024, Kcee released his fourth studio album Mr. Versatile, which included the hit single "Ojapiano".

== Studio albums ==
Title	Album details
Take Over	Released: 1 November 2013; Label: Five Star Music; Format: CD, digital download
Attention to Detail	Released: 24 August 2017; Label: Five Star Music; Format: CD, digital download
Eastern Conference	Released: 5 April 2019; Label: Five Star Music; Format: CD, digital download
Mr. Versatile	Released: 26 July 2024; Label: Five Star Music; Format: Streaming, digital download
Okonkwo and Sons Unlimited	Released: 27 November 2025; Label: Five Star Music; Format: Streaming, digital download

== Extended plays ==
Title	Album details
Cultural Praise (with Okwesili Eze Group)	Released: 30 March 2021; Label: Five Star Music; Format: Streaming, digital download

== Singles ==
=== As lead artist ===
List of singles as lead artist, showing year released and album name
Title	Year	Album
"Okpekete"	2011	Non-album single
"Now I Know"	2011	Non-album single
"Carnival"	2011	Non-album single
"Okpekete (Remix)" (featuring Davido)	2012	Non-album single
"Give It To Me" (featuring Flavour)	2012	Take Over
"Limpopo"	2013	Take Over
"Okoso"	2013	Take Over
"Pullover" (featuring Wizkid)	2013	Take Over
"Ogadinma"	2013	Take Over
"Pullover (Remix)" (featuring Don Jazzy and Wizkid)	2013	Take Over
"Emmah" (featuring D'banj)	2014	Take Over
"Fine Face"	2014	Non-album single
"Ogaranya" (featuring Davido)	2014	Take Over
"Turn by Turn"	2015	Non-album singles
"Feel It" (with Harrysong and Iyanya)	2015	Non-album singles
"Limba"	2015	Non-album singles
"Love Boat" (featuring Diamond Platnumz)	2015	Non-album singles
"Alkayida" (featuring Timaya)	2015	Non-album singles
"Agbomma"	2015	Non-album singles
"Talk & Do" (featuring Uhuru and DJ Buckz)	2015	Non-album singles
"Ebaeno" (with Harrysong and Skiibii)		Non-album singles
"Bureau De Changer"	2016	Non-album singles
"Correct" (featuring Yemi Alade)	2016	Non-album singles
"Tinana"	2016	Non-album singles
"Tender" (featuring Tekno)	2016	Attention to Detail
"Romantic Call"	2017	Attention to Detail
"Desire"	2017	Attention to Detail
"We Go Party" (featuring Olamide)	2017	Attention to Detail
"Vanessa"	2017	Attention to Detail
"Dance" (featuring Phyno)	2017	Attention to Detail
"Wine For Me" (featuring Sauti Sol)	2017	Attention to Detail
"Burn" (featuring Sarkodie)	2018	Non-album single
"Bullion Squad"	2018	Non-album single
"Akonuche"	2018	Non-album single
"Boo" (featuring Tekno)	2018	Non-album single
"Psycho" (featuring Wizkid)	2018	Non-album single
"Protect Us"	2018	Non-album single
"Erima" (featuring Timaya)	2019	Non-album single
"Doh Doh Doh"	2019	Eastern Conference
"Isee" (featuring Anyidons)	2019	Non-album single
"Sweet Mary J"	2020	Non-album single
"Oya Parte"	2020	Non-album single
"Bobo"	2020	Non-album single
"Cultural Praise" (featuring Okwesili Eze Group)	2020	Non-album single
"Hold Me Tight" (featuring Peruzzi and Okwesili Eze Group)	2021	Non-album single
"True Love"	2022	Non-album single
"Mummy Moo" (featuring Ollie Gee)	2022	Non-album single
"Go" (featuring Iyanya)	2022	Non-album single
"Thanksgiving" (featuring Okwesili Eze Group)	2022	Non-album single
"Fine Lady"	2023	Non-album single
"Dum Dum" (featuring Skiibii)	2023	Non-album single
"Ojapiano"	2023	Mr. Versatile
"Ojaginger"	2023	Mr. Versatile
"Tuesday"	2023	Non-album single
"I Pray" (featuring Oxlade)	2023	Mr. Versatile
"Going" (featuring Kiki Derika)	2023	Non-album single
"Ebelebe" (featuring Skiibii and Teni)	2024	Mr. Versatile
"Ojapiano (Remix)" (featuring OneRepublic)	2024	Mr. Versatile
"Big Fish"	2024	Mr. Versatile
"Netfliss"	2024	Non-album singles
"Champion" (featuring Theresa Onuorah)	2024	Non-album singles
"Desha" (featuring S.N.E)	2024	Non-album singles
"Abeg"	2024	Non-album singles
"Allota Money" (with Mr. Killa featuring Wyclef Jean)	2025	Okonkwo and Sons Unlimited
"Eburuje"	2025	Okonkwo and Sons Unlimited
"Repost"	2025	Okonkwo and Sons Unlimited
"Show Off" (featuring Zoro)	2025	Okonkwo and Sons Unlimited
"Melody Praise"	2025	Non-album single

=== As featured artist ===
List of singles as featured artist, showing year released and album name
Title	Year	Album
"Chairman" (Seyi Shay featuring Kcee)	2013	Non-album single
"Oga" (Skutch featuring Kcee)	2014	Non-album single
"Shaba" (DJ Xclusive featuring Kcee and Patoranking)	2014	According to X
"Stay with Me" (Skiibii featuring Kcee)	2015	Non-album single
"Jambole (Remix)" (Eddy Kenzo featuring Kcee)	2015	Non-album single
"Shikorobo" (Shetta featuring Kcee)	2015	Non-album single
"Reggae Blues" (Harrysong featuring Olamide, Kcee, Iyanya, and Orezi)	2015	Non-album single
"Gyrate" (Addiction featuring Kcee and Harrysong)	2016	Non-album single
"Baba for the Girls" (Harrysong featuring Kcee)	2016	Non-album single
"Wigili" (Dr Amir featuring Kcee, Harrysong, and Skiibii)	2016	Non-album single
"Landlord" (Quincy featuring Kcee)	2016	Non-album single

=== Promotional singles ===
List of promotional singles
Title	Year	Album
"Nack Me" (featuring Harrysong)	2011	Non-album singles
"Okpekete (South African Remix)" (featuring Pablo)	2011	Non-album singles
"Tor Tori" (featuring Harrysong)	2011	Non-album singles
"Sweet Like Shuga" (with Flavour, Chidinma, Sound Sultan, and Professor)	2013	Non-album singles
"Shine Shine Baby" (with Harrysong)	2014	Non-album singles

== Music videos ==
=== As lead artist ===
List of music videos as lead artist, showing date released and directors
Title	Year	Director(s)	Ref.
"Now I Know"	2011	Soso Soberekon	
"Okpekete"	2011	Soso Soberekon	
"Okpekete (Remix)" (featuring Davido)	2012	Godfather Productions	
"Give It To Me" (featuring Flavour)	2012	Godfather Productions	
"Limpopo"	2013	Piguar Films	
"Okoso"	2013	Uncredited	
"Pullover" (featuring Wizkid)	2013	Clarence Peters	
"Sweet Like Shuga" (with Flavour, Chidinma, Sound Sultan, and Professor)	2013	Clarence Peters	
"Emmah" (featuring D'banj)	2014	Godfather Productions	
"Hakuna Matata"	2014	Soso Soberekon	
"Fine Face"	2014	Mazi Jizzle	
"Ogadinma"	2014	Aje Filmworks	
"Fine Face, Pt. 2"	2014	Soso Soberekon	
"Turn by Turn"	2015	Clarence Peters	
"Feel It" (with Harrysong and Iyanya)	2015	Uncredited	
"Limba"	2015	Uncredited	
"Love Boat" (featuring Diamond Platnumz)	2015	Nick Roux	
"Agbomma"	2015	Tchidi Chikere	
"Talk & Do" (featuring Uhuru and DJ Buckz)	2015	Uncredited	
"Ebaeno" (with Harrysong and Skiibii)	2015	Green Box and Mike Ezuruonye	
"Bureau De Changer"	2016	Uncredited	
"Idinma"	2016	Uncredited	
"Tinana"	2016	Mr. Moe Musa	
"Tender" (featuring Tekno)	2016	Patrick Elis	
"Romantic Call"	2017	Director Ace and Zacky Madar	
"Desire"	2017	Zacky Madar	
"We Go Party" (featuring Olamide)	2017	Unlimited L.A	
"Vanessa"	2017	Uncredited	
"Dance" (featuring Phyno)	2017	Clarence Peters	
"Whine for Me" (featuring Sauti Sol)	2017	Uncredited	
"Burn" (featuring Sarkodie)	2018	Moses Inwang and Nick Roux	
"Bullion Squad"	2018	Moses Inwang	
"Akonuche"	2018	Deen Legend	
"Boo" (featuring Tekno)	2018	Clarence Peters	
"Psycho" (featuring Wizkid)	2018	Patrick Elis	
"Erima" (featuring Timaya)	2019	Unlimited L.A	
"Doh Doh Doh"	2019	Unlimited L.A	
"Isee" (featuring Anyidons)	2019	Adasa Cookey	
"Oya Parte"	2020	Uncredited	
"Sweet Mary J"	2020	Green Box	
"Cultural Praise, Vol. 3" (featuring Okwesili Eze Group)	2021	Uncredited	
"Hold Me Tight" (featuring Peruzzi and Okwesili Eze Group)	2021	TG Omori	
"Cultural Vibes"		TG Omori	
"True Love"	2022	Uncredited	
"Mummy Moo" (featuring Ollie Gee)	2022	Mattmax	
"Go" (featuring Iyanya)	2022	Mattmax	
"Fine Lady"	2023	Unlimited L.A	
"Dum Dum" (featuring Skiibii)	2023	Mattmax	
"Ojapiano"	2023	Mattmax	
"Ojaginger"	2023	Mattmax	
"Tuesday"	2023	Patrick Elis	
"I Pray" (featuring Oxlade)	2023	Mattmax	
"Going" (featuring Kiki Derika)	2023	Mattmax	
"Ebelebe" (featuring Skiibii and Teni)	2024	Mattmax	
"Ojapiano (Remix)" (featuring OneRepublic)	2024	Uncredited	
"Big Fish"	2024	Mattmax	
"Obalende"	2024	Mattmax	
"Netfliss"	2024	Mattmax	
"Champion" (featuring Theresa Onuorah)	2024	Mattmax	
"Desha" (featuring S.N.E)	2024	J-Town	
"Allota Money" (with Mr. Killa featuring Wyclef Jean)	2025	Mattmax	
"Eburuje"	2025	Uncredited	
"Repost"	2025	Uncredited	
"Show Off" (featuring Zoro)	2025	Whoiztobi	
"Melody Praise"	2025	Sirhills	
"Na You Sabi" (featuring Umu Obiligbo)	2026	Mattmax	
"Idi Bad" (featuring Olamide)	2026	Mattmax	

=== As featured artist ===
List of music videos as lead artist, showing date released and directors
Title	Video release date	Director(s)	Ref.
"Aku (Remix)" (Slim Brown featuring Kcee and Olamide)	28 October 2018	Adasa Cookey	
"Landlord" (Quincy featuring Kcee)	5 May 2016	Adasa Cookey	
"Baba for the Girls" (Harrysong featuring Kcee)	5 May 2016		
"Reggae Blues" (Harrysong featuring Olamide, Kcee, Iyanya, and Orezi)	7 August 2015	Adasa Cookey	
"Shikorobo" (Shetta featuring Kcee)	29 March 2015	Mirror Effect Media	
"Jambole (Remix)" (Eddy Kenzo featuring Kcee)	25 February 2015	Mr. Moe Musa	
"Stay with Me" (Skiibii featuring Kcee)	5 January 2015		
"Shaba" (DJ Xclusive featuring Kcee and Patoranking)	12 December 2014	Adasa Cookey	
"Tele Mi" (Harrysong featuring Kcee)	17 January 2014		
