= Emergency (WizzyPro song) =

Single by WizzyPro featuring Runtown, Patoranking, and Skales

from the album Lord of the Sounds
- Released: 2 November 2013
- Recorded: 2013
- Genre: Afropop
- Length: 3:52
- Label: Dem Mama Records
- Songwriters: Douglas Jack-Agu; Patrick Okorie; Raoul John Njeng-Njeng
- Producer: WizzyPro

WizzyPro singles chronology
"Kokumba" (2013)	"Emergency" (2013)	"G.R.I.N.D" (2014)

Runtown singles chronology
"Mic Check" (2013)	"Emergency" (2013)	"Gallardo" (2014)

Patoranking singles chronology
"Gravity" (2013)	"Emergency" (2013)	"Girlie O" (2014)

Skales singles chronology
"Blackberry" (2013)	"Emergency" (2013)	"Like Clay" (2013)

"Emergency" is a song recorded by Nigerian record producer WizzyPro for his debut studio album, Lord of the Sounds (2016). It was released on 2 November 2013 and features vocal appearances from Nigerian musicians Patoranking, Runtown and Skales. While each artist solely wrote their own respective verse, WizzyPro served as the track's executive producer.

The song was viewed favourably among several music critics, most of which noted "Emergency" as a standout track on Lord of the Sound. The single won the "Best Collaboration" category at the 2014 edition of The Headies. An accompanying music video for "Emergency" was released on 18 January 2014 and features the four singers performing the song to the public while dancing and singing in a street.

== Background and composition ==
Development of the song first began in WizzyPro's personal recording studio. According to Pulse's Joey Akan, despite recruiting several "young guns" for the original composition, WizzyPro did not intend for "Emergency" to become a success. The single was ultimately released on 2 November 2013 through Dem Mama Records. Following its surge in popularity, it was announced in March 2016 that "Emergency" would be included on WizzyPro's debut studio album, titled Lord of the Sounds (2016).

An afropop song lasting for three minutes and fifty-two seconds, "Emergency" was written by Douglas Jack, Patrick Okorie, and Raoul John Njeng-Njeng, while WizzyPro provided the original production. All three artists wrote their own individual verses, as performed over varying chord progressions. During Patoranking's verse, he refers to the track's lead artist and exclaims: "I see emergency, na na na / WizzyPro beats causing madness". Badmus Bello Shuaibu, a writer for Naija Celebrity, inferred that the use of the word 'emergency' in Davido's 2014 single "Aye" was inspired by the repetitiveness in "Emergency".

== Reception ==
"Emergency" was well received by contemporary music critics. Shuaibu from Naija Celebrity wrote about "Emergency" in his "Hit Song of the Week" column, where he claimed: "You can't walk pass a street in Lagos without hearing people singing [the song]." Ovie O. from the Nigerian music website NotJustOk described the single as a "banger", while Filfi Adinkra from Ghana Ndwom declared it a "crazy jam". Along the same lines, Abiola Solanke from Pulse called it "top notch" and acclaimed the production that WizzyPro performed on the track. AllAfrica.com's Aderibigbe Tolulope found his production skills exceptional and "enough to show he's taking the music business seriously".

In 2014, "Emergency" was selected for two distinctions within the Nigerian music industry. At the 2014 Nigeria Entertainment Awards held in New York City, "Emergency" was nominated under the "Best Collaboration" category, but lost to Runtown's "Gallardo". Additionally, it won at The Headies 2014 held on Victoria Island for the same category.

=== Accolades ===
Year	Award ceremony	Prize	Result	Ref
2014	2014 Nigeria Entertainment Awards	Best Collaboration	Nominated	
2014	The Headies 2014	Best Collaboration	Won	

== Music video ==
An accompanying music video for "Emergency" was released on 18 January 2014 through WizzyPro's official YouTube account. The visual was directed by Patrick Ellis and features cameos from all of the track's artists. The video commences with Runtown walking through a street while singing the song's lyrics; the other musicians join him after departing nearby parked cars. From a crowd of people, each of them step forward during their verses, which continues for the video's entirety.
