= WizzyPro =

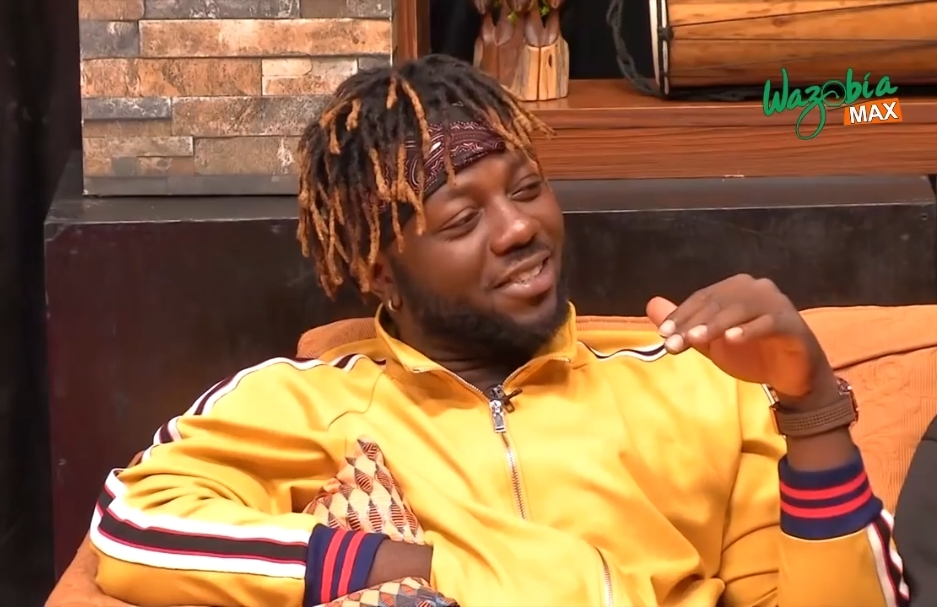

Background information
- Born: Nifu Haruna; Kogi State, Nigeria
- Genres: Reggae; Afropop; Dancehall; Pop; Hip hop; Afrobeats
- Occupation: Record producer
- Years active: 2006–present
- Label: BeatBox

Nifu Haruna, also known by his stage name WizzyPro is a Nigerian record producer and sound engineer. Best known for his single titled "Emergency", WizzyPro is credited as the producer of Patoranking's first official single titled "Alubarika" which brought him to the limelight. WizzyPro is signed to BeatBox and is currently working on his debut studio album titled Lord of the Sound.

== Production discography ==
Year	Song	Artist(s)	Album
2012	"Aunty Tolu"	Runtown (featuring Timaya)	Non-album single
2013	"Sweet You"	Attitude (featuring Skales)	Non-album single
2013	"Tonite"	Faze (featuring Patoranking)	Non-album single
2013	"Successful"	Runtown	Non-album single
2013	"The Control"	Runtown	Non-album single
2014	"Girlie O"	Patoranking	Non-album single
2014	"O Set"	Phyno (featuring P-Square)	No Guts No Glory
2014	"Anam-Achi Vers-Achi"	Phyno (featuring Runtown)	No Guts No Glory
2014	"Mr. Wonder"	Pastor J	Non-album single
2014	"Have Mercy"	Patoranking (featuring Skales)	Non-album single
2015	"All The Way"	John Douglas	Non-album single
2016	"Another Level"	Patoranking	Non-album single

== Awards and nominations ==
Year	Award ceremony	Prize	Recipient	Result	Ref
2014	2014 Nigeria Entertainment Awards	Best Collaboration	"Emergency"	Nominated	
2014	The Headies 2014	Best Collaboration	"Emergency"	Won	
2015	Beatz Award	Best Afro-dancehall Producer	Himself	Won	
