= KCee =

Nigerian singer and songwriter

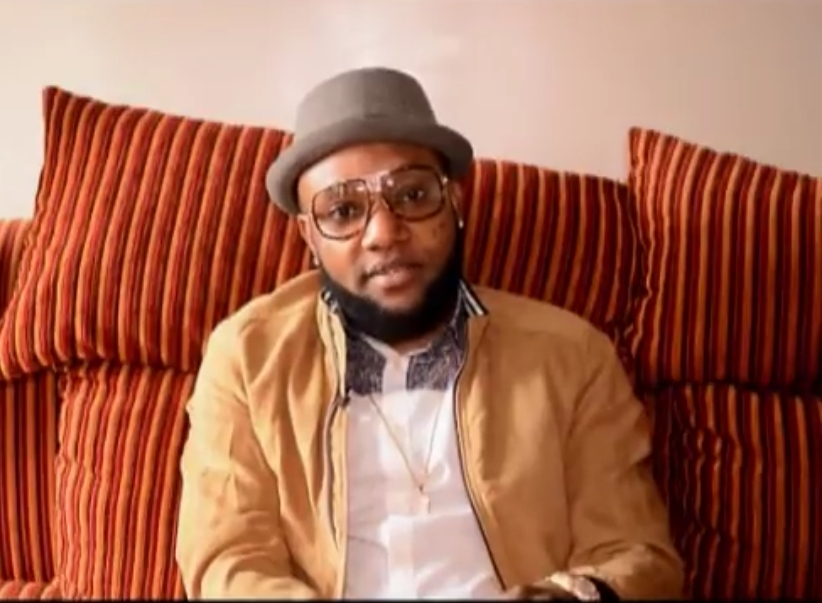

Background information
- Born: Kingsley Chinweike Okonkwo; 18 April 1979 (age 47); Ajegunle, Lagos State, Nigeria
- Origin: Amaputu, Uli, Anambra State
- Genres: Afro pop, gospel, Igbo highlife
- Occupations: Singer, songwriter, performer
- Years active: 1999–present
- Label: Five Star Music
- Formerly of: KC Presh
- Spouse: Ijeoma Okonkwo (m. 2010)

Kingsley Chinweike Okonkwo, better known as KCee, is a Nigerian singer and songwriter. He was formerly in the hip-hop duo KC Presh. He is from Amaputu in Uli in Ihiala local government area in Anambra State, Nigeria. He currently has a record deal with Five Star Music. He worked with Del B, a record producer known for producing Kcee's popular song "Limpopo". He is the elder brother to E-money.

== Early life and music career ==
Kingsley Chinweike Okonkwo was born on 18 April 1979. He has his roots in Uli, Anambra State, despite being born and raised in Lagos and growing up in Ajegunle. Growing up, Kcee was immersed in diverse musical styles, including reggae, highlife, and Afrobeat. Kcee's music career began in 1999 when he teamed up with Precious John, aka Presh, to form the dynamic duo KC Presh. Kcee and his longtime partner and friend Presh played as a duo for 12 years. They met in a church choir, and gained national recognition after winning the Star Quest talent show in 2002, a competition that showcased their talent to a broader audience. Following their win, KC Presh enjoyed some success in the Nigerian music scene, releasing the albums Sio Nkpo (2006) and Get Ready (2010) and gaining a moderate following. Their work together as music partners gave them both some recognition until 2011 when they split, both chasing separate careers.

Following his split with Presh, KCee launched his solo career, releasing "Okpekete" as his debut solo single. He released a remix of the song featuring Davido in 2012; its music video was shot by Godfather Productions. KCee shot his first music video as a solo artist in August 2011 for a song titled "Now I Know", featuring uncredited vocals from Harrysong. The video for "Now I Know" was shot on the Balearic Islands in Spain.

In 2013, KCee released the single "Limpopo". The song was popular, taking over Nigerian airwaves and club playlists. "Limpopo" elevated KCee to stardom, earning him several awards and nominations, specifically Song of the Year at The Headies 2013. On 19 September 2013, KCee released the song "Pullover" featuring Wizkid. The official remix to "Pullover" features Don Jazzy and was released on 31 October 2013. The song's music video, directed by Clarence Peters, features cameo appearances by Chinedu Ikedieze, Osita Iheme, Saka, Harrysong, and Skiibii. It follows a comedic storyline in which Kcee and Saka act as traffic officers stopping female drivers to check their "particulars". The single shared the award for Hottest Single of the Year with Davido's "Aye" at the 2014 Nigeria Entertainment Awards and its video won the award for Most Gifted Duo/Group or Featuring at the 2014 Channel O Music Video Awards. "Pullover" also received nominations for Best Pop Single at The Headies 2014, Single of the Year at the Ben TV Awards 2014, Best Collabo of the Year at the 2014 City People Entertainment Awards, Best Use of Dance in a Video at the 2014 Nigerian Music Video Awards. "Pullover" debuted at number nine on the MTV Base Official Top 10 chart for the week of 2 to 9 December 2013. The week of 24 January 2014, "Pullover" reached number one on the chart, displacing D'banj's "Finally". It stayed on top for two weeks until it was knocked off the chart by Wizkid's "Jaiye Jaiye". Nigerian singer Chike performed a cover of the song for the semi-finals of The Voice Nigeria.

KCee released his debut studio album Take Over on 1 November 2013 through Five Star Music. Guest appearances include D'banj, Don Jazzy, Davido, Wizkid, Timaya, Phyno, and Flavour. The album received a nomination for Best R&B/Pop Album at The Headies 2014, and Best Album of the Year at the 2014 Nigeria Entertainment Awards.

On 3 April 2020, Kcee released the single "Sweet Mary J" as his first single of the year. In June 2023, he released the single, "Ojapiano", which blends the traditional sounds of Ọjà music, originating from the Igbos of South East Nigeria, with the popular South African beats of Amapiano.

=== Endorsements ===
- Kcee signed a multi millionaire endorsement deal with telecommunications company MTN in 2013.
- Patience Jonathan appointed Kcee as Peace Ambassador Of The Federal Republic of Nigeria.
- He signed a multi millionaire endorsement deal with Telecommunications company MTN in 2015.
- Magnum 2015

== Achievements ==
Kcee's contributions to the music industry have earned him numerous recognitions and accolades. Some of his notable achievements include: Winning awards at the Headies, Nigeria entertainment awards and MTV Africa music Awards. He was also nominated for various other awards. Kcee's financial success was further cemented through strategic endorsement deals, notably with MTN Nigeria in 2013, a partnership that solidified his status as a brand ambassador. Additional collaborations with prominent brands, including Magnum, have contributed to his success.

Kcee has evolved his sound in recent years, showcasing his artistic versatility by blending contemporary styles with elements of traditional highlife. This fusion has revitalized his music, appealing to both nostalgic fans of classic Nigerian sounds and newer generations of Afrobeats enthusiasts. His 2020 album, “Cultural Praise,” in collaboration with Okwesili Eze Group, is a perfect example of his ability to evolve while staying connected to his roots. The album was a massive hit, especially among Igbo communities, and it showcased Kcee’s ability to infuse gospel and cultural praise into modern sounds.

== Personal life ==
Kcee keeps his personal life relatively private, but it is known that he is married to Ijeoma Okonkwo, and they have two children together. Despite his fame and flamboyant lifestyle, Kcee has managed to keep his family life away from the public eye, maintaining a healthy balance between his personal and professional life.

== Controversies ==
On 28 January 2021, Jude Nnam, a catholic music composer issued a formal letter to Five Star Music, Kcee's record label, through his lawyer alleging copyright infringement. Specifically, Nnam claimed that Kcee's song, "Som Too Chukwu", which was a song Nnam wrote and composed in 2001 to celebrate his daughter's first year birthday violated his intellectual property rights. Kcee added the said song to his 2021 album Cultural Praise, Vol. 1 without permission of the composer, thus the lawsuit. He further filed a 500- million lawsuit against Kcee. However, after a prolonged legal battle, the copyright infringement case against Kcee reached its conclusion in September 2024. At the Lagos Federal High Court, presided over by Justice Kehinde Ogundare, Nnam's claims of copyright infringement were dismissed due to insufficient evidence.

Kcee's June 2024 single, "Ojapaino", sparked controversy when Igwe Credo, creator of the song's signature 'Mbem' sound and the manager of Ojazzy who was the flutist of 'Ojapaino, alleged that they were paid only two hundred thousand for their contribution to the song. He also accused him of abandoning ojazzy, the flutist. Credo expressed hopes that Kcee would provide exposure to boost his own music career. He later stated that he is not interested in the money but demanded that Kcee drafts a contract that provides royalty to the song for them to sign. Initially,. Kcee kept mute over the allegation. However, breaking his silence, Kcee took to Instagram to address the allegations. He expressed disappointment and shared receipts of payments totaling over one million naira made to Igwe Credo on various occasions. He also stated to have invited them to different events to perform but was repeatedly turned down. In addition, he stated that Igwe credo and Ojazzy performs 'Ojapaino' at events without his permission. He emphasized that "Ojapaino" is his intellectual property, and any unauthorized performances constitute a violation of his rights.

That same year in 2024, amidst the Gwogwogwo trend, Kcee faced backlash over allegations of unauthorized song usage. Rumors surfaced that his 2022 track "Cultural Vibes" sampled Mike Ejeagha's work without permission. Kcee responded to the allegation by sampling with conclusive evidence. He shared a 2018 video showcasing his teams visiting Mike Ejeagha. Kcee further addressed allegations of unauthorized sampling, stating: "I obtained Mike Ejeagha's explicit authorization before using his intellectual property. All necessary paperwork was completed properly."

== Discography ==
Studio albums

- Take Over (2013)
- Attention to Detail (2017)
- Eastern Conference (2019)
- Mr. Versatile (2024)
- Okonkwo and Suns Unlimited (2025)

== Videography ==
| Year | Title | Director | Ref |
|---|---|---|---|
| 2016 | Bambala As featured artiste | Avalon Okpe | |
| 2016 | Agbomma | Tchidi Chikere | |
| 2018 | Burn | Sneeze | |
| 2018 | Bullion Squad | Moses Inwang | |
| 2018 | Boo featuring Tekno | Clarence Peters | |

== Awards and nominations ==
| Year | Awards ceremony | Award description(s) | Recipient | Results | Ref |
|---|---|---|---|---|---|
| 2013 | The Headies | Producer of the Year | Del B for "Limpopo" | Nominated | |
| 2013 | The Headies | Song of the Year | "Limpopo" | Won | |
| 2013 | Channel O Music Video Awards 2013 | Most Gifted Dance Video | "Limpopo" | Nominated | |
| 2014 | The Headies | Best R&B/Pop Album | Take Over | Nominated | |
| 2014 | The Headies | Hip Hop World Revelation of the Year | Himself for Take Over | Won | |
| 2014 | The Headies | Artiste of the Year | Himself | Nominated | |
| 2025 | The Headies | Special Recognition | Himself | Won | |

== See also ==
- List of Nigerian musicians
