= No Guts No Glory (Phyno album) =

Studio album by Phyno
- Released: March 20, 2014
- Recorded: 2012–2014
- Genres: Igbo rap; afrobeats; Igbo highlife
- Labels: Sputnet Records; Penthauze Music
- Producers: Phyno; Major Bangz; WizzyPro; Chopstix; JStunt

Phyno chronology
No Guts No Glory (2014)	2 Kings (2015)

Singles from No Guts No Glory
- 1. "Ghost Mode" Released: September 25, 2012; 2. "Man of the Year (Obago)" Released: March 23, 2013; 3. "Parcel" Released: October 11, 2013; 4. "O Set" Released: March 4, 2014

No Guts No Glory (abbreviated as NGNG) is the debut studio album by Nigerian rapper Phyno. It was released by Sputnet Records and Penthauze Music on March 20, 2014. The album features guest appearances from P-Square, Omawumi, Olamide, Stormrex, Efa, Flavour N'abania, Runtown, Ice Prince, M.I, Mr Raw, Timaya and Illbliss. Phyno enlisted Major Bangz, WizzyPro, Chopstix and JStunt to assist with production. Primarily recorded in Igbo and Nigerian Pidgin, No Guts No Glory was supported by the singles "Ghost Mode", "Man of the Year", "Parcel" and "O Set". The album received generally positive reviews from music critics, who commended its indigenous sound and lyrical depth.

== Background and promotion ==
Initially scheduled for release in November 2013, No Guts No Glory was strategically postponed in order to capitalize on the downtime of the Nigerian music industry during the first quarter of the year. On March 15, 2014, Phyno released the album's cover art and track list. He promoted the project by rolling out several tee shirts with the NGNG logo.

The Olamide-assisted track "Ghost Mode" was released on September 25, 2012, as the album's lead single. The song won Best Collabo at both the 2012 The Headies Awards and 2013 Nigeria Entertainment Awards. The music video for "Ghost Mode" was filmed in Lagos by Clarence Peters. The album's second single, "Man of the Year (Obago)", was released on March 23, 2013. The song was produced by Phyno and won Best Rap Single at The Headies 2012. Its music video was also recorded by Peters in Abakpa Nike and features a cameo appearance from Illbliss. In September 2013, the Nigerian Broadcasting Corporation banned the music video from being broadcast.

The album's third single "Parcel", originally titled "Parcel (a Big Nwa)", was released on October 11, 2013. The song's music video was directed by Peters and released on February 19, 2014. On March 4, 2014, Phyno released the album's fourth single "O Set", which was produced by WizzyPro and features guest vocals by P-Square. The music video for "O Set" was directed by Jude Engees Okoye and uploaded to YouTube at approximately 4 minutes. On May 22, 2014, Phyno released the Peters-directed visuals for "Alobam". The song was produced by Major Bangz and is an Igbo slang for "My Guy". In the video, Phyno paid tribute to some of his peers, including Ice Prince, Flavour, P-Square, Olamide and J Martins. On September 2, 2014, Phyno released the visuals for the Flavour-assisted track "Authe (Authentic)".

== Composition ==
Phyno narrated his life story in a hilarious manner on the album's intro. "Alobam" is an ode to Phyno's friends who have contributed to his success; the song's instrumental is a cross between Drake's "Worst Behavior" and Olamide's "Sitting on the Throne". "Good Die Young" samples Marvin Gaye's version of "Abraham, Martin and John", and is a tribute to the friends Phyno lost to diseases, accident and armed robbery. "Nme Nme" is a groovy highlife throwback song about life's enjoyment, while "Chukwu Na Enye" is a highlife song with a gospel feel. Nigeria's rich language diversity is displayed in "Aju (She Know It)".

== Critical reception ==
Professional ratings
Review scores
Source	Rating
Nigerian Entertainment Today	4.1 stars on a 5 point scale

No Guts No Glory received generally positive reviews from music critics. Writing for Nigerian Entertainment Today, Chiagoziem Onyekwena awarded the album 4.1 stars out of 5, acknowledging it for widening "the landscape of indigenous Nigerian Hip-Hop". Pulse Nigeria's Joey Akan opined that NGNG "sure works" and said its "importance far outweighs the personal benefits for Phyno". Obina Agwu of Premium Times newspaper called NGNG a "solid debut rap album" despite pointing out that Phyno "fell for the common industry misconception that an album must parade big names". In a lukewarm review for YNaija, Wilfred Okiche said Phyno "makes some dubious decisions instead and dilutes the punch hinted at by the title."

=== Accolades ===
No Guts No Glory was nominated for Rap Album of the Year at the 2014 City People Entertainment Awards. It was also nominated for Best Rap Album and Album of the Year at The Headies 2014.

== Track listing ==
No.	Title	Writer(s)	Producer(s)	Length
1.	"Intro (Chibuzo)" (featuring Stormrex)	Azubuike Nelson; Stormrex	Major Bangz	2:28
2.	"Alobam"	Nelson	Major Bangz	4:37
3.	"O Set" (featuring P-Square)	Nelson; Peter and Paul Okoye	Wizzy Pro	3:56
4.	"Nme Nme"	Nelson	Major Bangz	3:17
5.	"Man of the Year (Obago)"	Nelson	Phyno	3:21
6.	"Chukwu Na Enye" (featuring Omawumi)	Nelson; Omawumi Megbele	Phyno	4:36
7.	"Aju (She Know It)" (featuring Olamide and Efa)	Nelson; Olamide Adedeji; Efa Iwara	Major Bangz	4:54
8.	"Parcel Skit" (featuring Chigul)	Chioma Omeruah	—	1:39
9.	"Parcel"	Nelson	Major Bangz	3:57
10.	"Kush Music"	Nelson	Phyno	4:28
11.	"Authe (Authentic)" (featuring Flavour N'abania)	Nelson; Chinedu Okoli	JStunt	3:18
12.	"Anamachi Versace" (featuring Runtown)	Nelson; Douglas Jack-Agu	Wizzy Pro	3:14
13.	"Good Die Young"	Nelson	Major Bangz	3:11
14.	"Ojigi"	Nelson	JStunt	4:07
15.	"Icholiya" (featuring Ice Prince and M.I)	Nelson; Panshak Zamani; Jude Abaga	Chopstix	4:12
16.	"Shey U Know"	Nelson	Major Bangz	3:43
17.	"Ghost Mode" (featuring Olamide)	Nelson; Adedeji	Phyno	3:50
18.	"Holiday" (featuring Runtown)	Nelson; Jack-Agu	Phyno	4:19

Bonus tracks
No.	Title	Writer(s)	Producer(s)	Length
19.	"Multiply" (featuring Mr Raw, Timaya, Flavour N'abania and M.I)	Nelson; Ukeje Okechukwu; Inetimi Odon; Okoli; Jude Abaga	Phyno	4:54
20.	"Paper Chaser" (featuring Illbliss)	Nelson; Tobechukwu Ejiofor	Phyno	4:52

Notes

- "—" denotes a skit

Samples

- "Good Die Young" samples Marvin Gaye's version of "Abraham, Martin and John".

== Personnel ==
- Azubuike Nelson – primary artist, producer, writer, performer
- Major Bangz – producer
- Wizzy Pro – producer
- Chopstix – producer
- JStunt – producer
- Stormrex – featured artist, writer
- Peter and Paul Okoye – featured artist, writer
- Omawumi Megbele – featured artist, writer
- Olamide Adedeji – featured artist, writer
- Efa Iwara – featured artist, writer
- Chinedu Okoli – featured artist, writer
- Douglas Jack-Agu – featured artist, writer
- Panshak Zamani – featured artist, writer
- Jude Abaga – featured artist, writer
- Ukeje Okechukwu – featured artist, writer
- Enetimi Odom – featured artist, writer
- Tobechukwu Ejiofor – featured artist, writer
- Chioma Omeruah – writer, skit
- The Goretti Company – management

== Release history ==
Country/Digital platform	Date	Version	Format	Label
Nigeria; iTunes	March 20, 2014	Standard	CD; digital download	Sputnet Records; Penthauze Music
