= The Never Say Never Guy =

Studio album by Skales
- Released: 29 May 2017
- Length: 71:16
- Label: Baseline Music
- Producer: Echo; Egar Boi; Krizbeatz; Young John; Jay Pizzle; Pimpz Beat; Killertunes; Mckeezy; Spellz; Young D

Skales chronology
Man of the Year (2015)	The Never Say Never Guy (2017)	Mr Love (2018)

Singles from The Never Say Never Guy
- 1. "Ajaga" Released: 8 August 2016; 2. "Temper (Remix)" Released: 22 December 2016; 3. "Give Me Love" Released: 27 March 2017; 4. "For You" Released: 1 May 2017

The Never Say Never Guy is the second studio album by Nigerian singer Skales. It was released on 29 May 2017 by Baseline Music and features guest appearances from Burna Boy, Wande Coal, Timaya, Phyno, PJ Morton, Rotimi, Lil Kesh, Fifi Cooper, Egar Boi, and Davido. The album's production was handled from a variety of producers, such as Echo, Egar Boi, Krizbeatz, Young John, Jay Pizzle, Pimpz Beat, Killertunes, Mckeezy, Spellz, and Young D. The Never Say Never Guy serves as a follow-up to Skales' debut Man of the Year (2016).

== Background ==
Skales revealed the album art and track listing to The Never Say Never Guy on 19 May 2017.

== Singles ==
The album's Davido and Timaya-assisted lead single, "Ajaga", was released on 8 August 2016. The track was produced by Egar Boi. The remix to Skales' popular song "Temper" was released as the third single on 22 December 2016. The remix features Burna Boy and was produced by Krizbeatz. It was nominated for Best Collabo at the 2017 Nigeria Entertainment Awards. The mid-tempo "Give Me Love" featuring Tekno was released as The Never Say Never Guy's third single on 27 March 2017. Produced by Spellz, its music video which released a day later was directed by Stanz Visualz. The video features colorful backdrops and a rooftop scene where both artists perform, with Tekno dancing enthusiastically. The fourth single, "For You", was released on 1 May 2017, alongside its official music video. Produced by Echo, the song features upbeat production with Skales singing to a love interest. The video, directed by HD Genesis, shows Skales performing in front of a private jet surrounded by dancers dressed in modern outfits.

== Critical reception ==
Temitope Delano of tooXclusive described The Never Say Never Guy as an unfocused and inconsistent album, criticizing Skales for relying heavily on big-name features while offering weak lyrics and a lack of clear artistic direction. Despite a few decent tracks, Delano felt the project suffered from identity confusion and failed to reflect the resilience implied by its title. The review concluded: "The Never Say Never Guy failed to impress even with him flirting with array of styles and personas." Joey Akan of Pulse Nigeria saw the album as an underwhelming project that failed to live up to Skales' inspiring personal comeback story. While the album had a few standout moments, it was ultimately let down by weak songwriting, poor production, and a lack of direction. The review concluded: “If we divest ourselves from his beautiful story, and focus on the music on display, then there's enough average material to support the 'negative' voices.” Akan rated the album a 2.5/5.

Oluwatosin Adeshokan of YNaija felt that the album was a disappointing effort from Skales, stating that despite its impressive guest list and production credits, the album lacked direction and personality. He observed that the featured artists consistently outshone Skales, who seemed to have little presence on his own songs. Adeshokan concluded that "Skales needs to go underground for a while, rediscover what made him the sought-after rapper from Kaduna and do right by the people that believe in him." Chiagoziem Onyekwena of FilterFree said that The Never Say Never Guy showed Skales’ focus on money and women, calling some tracks "dope" while others were "generic." He added that the album "could have been more solid" and concluded that Skales "continues to punch way below his creative weight class." He gave the album a rating of 50%.

== Track listing ==
The Never Say Never Guy track listing
No.	Title	Writer(s)	Producer(s)	Length
1.	"Thank God"	Raoul John Njeng-Njeng	Echo	3:50
2.	"Mama"	Njeng-Njeng	Echo	3:30
3.	"Gbefun Onetime" (featuring Burna Boy)	Njeng-Njeng; Damini Ogulu	Egar Boi	3:40
4.	"Booty Language"	Njeng-Njeng	Krizbeatz	3:35
5.	"Make Love in the Morning" (featuring Wande Coal)	Njeng-Njeng; Oluwatobi Ojosipe	Krizbeatz	4:12
6.	"Kpete Wicked"	Njeng-Njeng	Jay Pizzle	3:37
7.	"Loke Loke"	Njeng-Njeng	Young John	3:37
8.	"Gallant" (featuring Lil Kesh)	Njeng-Njeng; Keshinro Ololade	Young D	3:14
9.	"For You"	Njeng-Njeng	Echo	3:28
10.	"Ko Ma Gbon"	Njeng-Njeng	Pimpz Beat	2:35
11.	"Speak My Mind" (featuring Timaya)	Njeng-Njeng; Inetimi Odon	Echo	3:42
12.	"Let Me Love You" (featuring Phyno)	Njeng-Njeng; Chibuzor Azubuike	Killertunes	3:50
13.	"Feel Good" (featuring PJ Morton)	Njeng-Njeng; Paul Morton Jr.	Mckeezy	3:21
14.	"Lavish" (featuring Rotimi)	Njeng-Njeng; Olurotimi Akonosho	Echo	3:33
15.	"Booty Language" (remix; featuring Sarkodie)	Njeng-Njeng; Michael Addo	Krizbeatz	3:35
16.	"Jogodo"	Njeng-Njeng	Echo	3:30
17.	"That Shhh" (featuring Fifi Cooper and Egar Boi)	Njeng-Njeng; Refilwe Mooketsi; Ernest Itiveh	Egar Boi	3:35

Bonus tracks
No.	Title	Writer(s)	Producer(s)	Length
18.	"Give Me Love" (featuring Tekno)	Njeng-Njeng; Augustine Kelechi	Spellz	3:29
19.	"Temper" (remix; featuring Burna Boy)	Njeng-Njeng; Ogulu	Krizbeatz	3:54
20.	"Ajaga" (featuring Davido and Timaya)	Njeng-Njeng; David Adeleke; Odon	Egar Boi	3:29
Total length:				71:16

== Release history ==
Release history and formats for The Never Say Never Guy
Region	Date	Format	Label
Various	29 May 2017	CD; digital download	Baseline Music
