= The Banger =

Single by Runtown featuring Uhuru

from the album Ghetto University
- Released: December 9, 2014
- Recorded: 2014
- Length: 3:29
- Label: Eric-Manny Entertainment
- Songwriters: Douglas Jack; Themba Sekowe; Nqobile Mahlanu; Sihle Dlalisisa; Xelimpilo Simelane
- Producer: Uhuru

Runtown singles chronology
"Baby Answer" (2013)	"The Banger" (2014)	"Bend Down Pause" (2015)

Uhuru singles chronology
"Kami Na Tutu" (2014)	"The Banger" (2014)	"Nane" (2014)

Music video
- "The Banger" on YouTube

"The Banger" is a single by Nigerian recording artist Runtown, featuring vocals from South African music group Uhuru. It was released as a single off his debut studio album titled Ghetto University on 9 December 2014 through Eric-Manny Entertainment and went on to become a club favorite after receiving numerous airplay and positive reviews.

== Background and release ==
The Banger was released on 9 December 2014 after it was recorded during a studio session in South Africa. Shot in Pretoria, South Africa by Justin Campos, the music video for "The Banger" which featured guest appearance from DJ Maphorisa was released unto video sharing website YouTube on 2 June 2015.

== Live performances ==
Some days after the release of the video for "The Banger", Runtown performed the song alongside Uhuru after headlining the King Kongs Sundays at Club Harem, South Africa. He also performed the song at the 2015 Star Trek event in Makurdi, Benue State.
