= Skuki =

Nigerian Afro hip-hop

Skuki is a Nigerian Afro hip-hop duo composed of two brothers: Tumininu Laolu-Oguniyi and Atewologun Laolu-Ogunniyi. They are also known as Vavavoom (Tumininu) and Peeshaun (Atewologun).

== Early lives ==
The brothers were both born in the 1980s in Oyo State, Nigeria. They attended The Staff School, University of Ibadan and The International School, University of Ibadan. The duo developed an interest in music shortly after they graduated from secondary school. Shortly after that, they had to part ways as Tumininu went to study Geography at the University of Lagos while Atewo studied law at the University of Ibadan.

Their father is a musician, director and producer. Recognising their talent he involved them in a nationwide awareness tour of the War Against Indiscipline (WAI) program where they performed in the presence of the then Head of State, Gen Ibrahim Babangida and other notable Nigerians. He then featured them in a TV commercial for Sungass in 1988; the result showed that the boys were a natural at entertaining. Noting them to be raw talents waiting to be tapped, he involved them in Children Celebration Theatre (CCT), a TV series and a host of other short plays. These activities increased their confidence in front of the camera, added a little to their acting skills and made them some money. They then featured in the 'Census 91' advert. They have always worked together, composing and recording over 40 songs.

== Career ==
The brothers reunited in 1999 in preparation to start a music career under the name "Skuki".

Their debut single, "Fire" stayed on the Africa Edition of the Channel O Top 10 Chart for four months and was number one for four consecutive weeks. Their singles "Stamina" featuring Mo'Cheddah and "Banger" featuring DJ Zeez brought them awards and prominence.

Skuki had another hit for 2013 "B.A.D", an acronym for "Beautiful and Different". The video for "B.A.D" was shot in Cape Town, South Africa and premiered on MTV Base Africa and Soundcity, gaining airplay on terrestrial and international music channels and garnered over 130,000 views on YouTube under one week of its release. They released a club and dance track which they titled "Voom-Va" which featured the Nigerian rap artist Phyno. "Voom-Va" was on most charts on radio stations across Nigeria and was a popular club song. Their current single "Gbemileke" features production skills by producer Shizzi, and has received airplay in Nigeria and other African countries. The video for the song was released in June 2014. The song has traditional Fuji baseline and the video was shot in South Africa.

== Discography ==
=== Singles ===
- 2008
  - "Fire"
- 2009
  - "Banger" (featuring DJ Zeez)
- 2010
  - "Stamina" (featuring Mo' Cheddah)
  - "Take You Home"
  - "Sho ti Gbo"
- 2011
  - "Hallelujah"
  - "Shanor"
- 2012
  - "Move It"
  - "Necessity"
- 2013
  - "B.A.D"
  - "Voom Va" (featuring Phyno)
- 2014
  - |"Gbemileke"
    (Skuki)
- 2015
  - "Gbemileke Remix" (featuring Tiwa Savage)
  - "Forever"

== Awards and nominations ==
=== City People Entertainment Awards ===
- Best New Musician – (Won)
- 2010: Best Group – (Nominated)

=== Dynamix All Youths Awards ===
- 2010: Most Promising Act – (Won)
- 2010: Song of the Year – (Nominated)
- 2010: Best New Act – (Nominated)

=== Nigeria Entertainment Awards ===
- 2014: Best New Act of the Year – (Nominated)

=== The Headies ===
- 2010: Next Rated – (Won)

=== Peak Awards ===
- Next Rated – (Won)

== Best New Act Nomination Controversy ==
On 30 May 2014, Skuki rejected a nomination for the "Best New Act" at the 2014 Nigeria Entertainment Awards. The duo released their debut album B.A.N.G.E.R in May 2010, and won the Next Rated award at The Headies 2010.

Awards and achievements
Preceded by Omawumi (2009)	Next Rated Award; 2010	Succeeded by Wizkid (2011)
