= Caro (L.A.X and Wizkid song) =

Single by Starboy featuring Wizkid and L.A.X

from the album Ayo
- Released: 20 August 2013
- Genre: Afropop
- Length: 4:07
- Label: Starboy
- Songwriters: Damilola Afolabi; Ayodeji Balogun
- Producer: Legendury Beatz

Wizkid singles chronology
"Bad Girl" (2013)	"Caro" (2013)	"Pullover" (2013)

L.A.X singles chronology
"Farida" (2013)	"Caro" (2013)	"Ginger" (2014)

"Caro" is an afropop song collaboratively recorded by Nigerian singers L.A.X and Wizkid. Released as the first official recording by Starboy Entertainment, the song was included as a bonus track on Wizkid's album Ayo (2014).

== Background ==
"Caro" serves as the first single recorded by the Starboy Entertainment label. In an interview with Showtime Celebrity, L.A.X said that he met Wizkid through celebrity stylist Toyin Lawani, who introduced him after playing some of his songs for Wizkid. He recalled visiting Wizkid's house around midnight for their first meeting, after which he signed a two-album recording deal with Starboy. While studying in London, L.A.X returned briefly to Nigeria to record new material, and during that period, Wizkid and L.A.X recorded "Caro".

== Music video ==
The music video for "Caro" was shot and directed in the United Kingdom by Moe Musa. It was uploaded onto YouTube on 20 August 2013.

== Awards and nominations ==
Year	Award ceremony	Prize	Result	Ref
2014	African Muzik Magazine Awards	Song of the Year	Nominated	
2014	Nigeria Entertainment Awards	Hottest Single of the Year	Nominated	
2014	The Headies	Best Pop Single	Nominated	
