= Man of the Year (album) =

Studio album by Skales
- Released: 18 May 2015
- Recorded: 2012–15
- Genre: Afropop; hip-hop; R&B
- Length: 77:38
- Label: Baseline
- Producer: Jay Pizzle; Spellz; Orbeat; DJ Coublon; Uhuru; Echo; Bobby Combz; Ganja Beatz; Drey Beatz; TK; Kenny Wonder

Skales chronology
Empire Mates State of Mind (2012)	Man of the Year (2015)	The Never Say Never Guy (2017)

Singles from Man of the Year
- 1. "I Am for Real" / "Je Kan Mo" Released: 21 January 2015; 2. "Always" Released: 13 May 2015; 3. "Ijo Ayo" Released: 15 May 2015; 4. "Lo Le" Released: 11 September 2015

Man of the Year is the debut studio album by Nigerian singer and rapper Skales. Released on 18 May 2015 by Baseline Music, the album blends Afropop, hip-hop, and R&B, and features guest appearances from Davido, Olamide, Ice Prince, Burna Boy, Phyno, Reekado Banks, Victoria Kimani, Rotimi, Attitude, Kenny Wonder, and Capital FEMI. Man of the Year was supported by the singles "I Am for Real", "Je Kan Mo", "Always", "Ijo Ayo", and "Lo Le". His 2014 single, "Shake Body", appears as a bonus track, alongside its French version.

== Background and promotion ==
Born Raoul John Njeng-Njeng, Skales began his music career after meeting M.I Abaga and Jesse Jagz in 2007. After releasing his debut single "Must Shine" and appearing on the talent show Zain Tru Search, he moved to Lagos and signed with Empire Mates Entertainment (E.M.E), a label founded by Banky W. and Tunde Demuren. On 24 November 2011, he released his debut singles under the label: "Mukulu" and "Keresimesi" featuring Wizkid, both produced by Sarz. He was one of the main artists on the E.M.E compilation album Empire Mates State of Mind (2012), appearing on singles such as "Baddest Boy", "Ko Mo Le", "Sun Mo Mi", and "My Baby", among others.

After his contract with Empire Mates Entertainment expired in February 2014, Skales founded his label OHK Entertainment in May and subsequently signed with Baseline Music in July of that year. On 6 May 2014, Skales released "Shake Body" as his first single under OHK Entertainment. "Shake Body" appears on Man of the Year as a bonus track, along with its French version. The album version features Numerica, while the single version is performed solo by Skales. According to Nigerian Entertainment Today, Skales initially scheduled the album for release on 1 April 2015. The track list was revealed on 11 May 2015.

=== Singles ===
The album's lead singles, "I Am For Real" and "Je Kan Mo", were both released on 21 January 2015. "Always" featuring Davido, was released as the second single on 13 May 2015. The Olamide-assisted "Ijo Ayo" featuring Olamide was released on 15 May 2015 as the album's third single. The Uhuru-produced "Lo Le" was by Baseline Music and Universal Music South Africa released as the album's fourth single on 11 September 2015, and as his debut single in South Africa.

== Critical reception ==
Professional ratings
Review scores
Source	Rating
Pulse Nigeria	2.5/5 stars
tooXclusive	3.5/5 stars
Nigerian Entertainment Today	3.5/5 stars

Man of the Year garnered mixed reception from critics. Ayomide Tayo, in a review for Pulse Nigeria, called Man of the Year "bland and ordinary", saying that it lacks "a proper sense of direction" and "floats out of one's consciousness before you get to the last song". Adding that it "was meant to be the final proof that Skales is a man who should be at the very top", he rated the album 2.5 out of 5. Writing for The Lagos Review, Emmanuel Daraloye criticized Man of the Year for lacking originality, writing that it "curiously begins in copycat mode" and largely "aggregat[es] sounds of potential hits" without a distinct identity. He noted that while Skales is "a competent singer" with "melodious" music, the album "will not leave a dance floor unattended but neither will it leave a lasting impression", placing it within the "mediocrity that is the rule with contemporary Nigerian songs".

TooXclusive's Jim Donnett called the album "kick ass material", despite being "tiring and draggy", with much of its impact resting on "production and vocal features". He concluded that Skales remains “musically savvy, lyrically skilled, [and a] badass rapper", rating the album 3 out of 5. Dayo Showemimo of Nigerian Entertainment Today said that the album's “steady progression” across genres shows Skales' "impressive diversity" from rapper to singer. He acknowledged the absence of features from Skales' label mates, but said the project contains several standout songs and concluded that it "is a sure contender for the 'Album of the Year' crown", rating it 3.5 out of 5. Wilfred Okiche, writing for 360nobs criticized the album for its "blatant lack of personality" and said that Skales is "more man of the moment than Man of the year".

== Track listing ==
Man of the Year track listing
No.	Title	Writer(s)	Producer(s)	Length
1.	"Intro" (featuring Do2DTUN)	Oladotun Kayode	—	0:55
2.	"I'm a Winner" (featuring Burna Boy)	Raoul John Njeng-Njeng; Damini Ogulu		3:51
3.	"Lo Le"	Njeng-Njeng	Uhuru	3:30
4.	"Always" (featuring Davido)	Njeng-Njeng; David Adeleke	Spellz	4:00
5.	"Wonder" (featuring Reekado Banks)	Njeng-Njeng; Ayoleyi Solomon	Jay Pizzle	3:39
6.	"Ijo Ayo" (featuring Olamide)	Njeng-Njeng; Olamide Adedeji	Spellz	4:30
7.	"Koyewon"	Njeng-Njeng		3:38
8.	"What's Up"	Njeng-Njeng	DJ Coublon	3:16
9.	"I Am for Real"	Njeng-Njeng	Orbeat	3:27
10.	"OMG!" (featuring Victoria Kimani)	Njeng-Njeng; Victoria Kimani	Bobby Combz	3:38
11.	"Swagger Man" (featuring Ice Prince, Phyno)	Njeng-Njeng; Panshak Zamani; Chibuzor Azubuike	Jay Pizzle	4:03
12.	"No Condition"	Njeng-Njeng	Drey Beatz	4:03
13.	"Fa Ra We Mi" (featuring Kenny Wonder)	Njeng-Njeng; Kehinde Olagunju	Kenny Wonder; Ganja Beatz	3:31
14.	"Happy"	Njeng-Njeng	Drey Beatz	3:50
15.	"Your Body Hot" (featuring Attitude)	Njeng-Njeng; Destiny Eghomwanre	Fliptyce	3:49
16.	"Naughty"	Njeng-Njeng		2:50
17.	"Je Kan Mo"	Njeng-Njeng	Jay Pizzle	3:15
18.	"Another Round"	Njeng-Njeng	Jay Pizzle	3:26
19.	"Turn You On" (featuring Capital F.E.M.I, Rotimi)	Njeng-Njeng; Femi Adeyinka; Olurotimi Akinosho	DJ Coublon	3:34
20.	"I Forget (Outro)"	Njeng-Njeng		3:57
Total length:				77:38

Bonus tracks
No.	Title	Writer(s)	Producer(s)	Length
21.	"Shake Body"	Njeng-Njeng	Jay Pizzle	3:28
22.	"Shake Body (French Version)" (featuring Numerica)	Njeng-Njeng	Jay Pizzle	3:28

Notes

- "—" denotes a skit

Samples

- "OMG!" samples "Someone Out of Town" by Yuna

== Personnel ==
- Skales – primary artist
- Davido – featured artist
- Burna Boy – featured artist
- Ice Prince – featured artist
- Reekado Banks – featured artist
- Phyno – featured artist
- Capital FEMI – featured artist
- Rotimi – featured artist
- Olamide – featured artist
- Kenny Wonder – featured artist
- Olamide – featured artist
- Victoria Kimani – featured artist
- Numerica – featured artist
- Jay Pizzle – producer
- Drey Beatz – producer
- Kenny Wonder – producer
- Bobby Combz – producer
- Echo – producer
- TK – producer
- Spellz – producer
- Ganja Beatz – producer
- DJ Coublon – producer
- Orbeat – producer
- Uhuru – producer
