= Gallardo (Runtown song) =

Single by Runtown featuring Davido

from the album Ghetto University
- Released: 29 January 2014
- Recorded: 2014
- Genre: Afropop
- Length: 3:28
- Label: Penthauze; Sputnet
- Songwriters: Douglas Jack-Agu; David Adeleke
- Producer: TSpize

Runtown singles chronology
"Emergency" (2013)	"Gallardo" (2014)	"Successful" (2014)

Davido singles chronology
"All Di Girls" (2014)	"Gallardo" (2014)	"Aye" (2014)

Music video
- "Gallardo" on YouTube

"Gallardo" is a song by Nigerian singer Runtown featuring Davido. It was released on 29 January 2014 as the lead single from the former's debut studio album Ghetto University (2015). The song was produced by TSpize.

== Background ==
Runtown said in an interview with Encomium that "Gallardo" was recorded after plans to remix his song "Party Like It's 1980" changed. He explained that Timaya connected him with Davido during the session, which led to the creation of a new song instead of a remix. According to Runtown, the release of "Gallardo" helped increase recognition for him as an artist and marked a turning point in his career.

== Music video ==
The music video for "Gallardo" was shot and directed in Nigeria by Clarence Peters. The video features cameo appearances from Patoranking, Skales and Phyno. It was uploaded to YouTube on 5 March 2014. The video also peaked at number one on MTV Base's Official Naija Top 10 chart.

== Critical reception ==
"Gallardo" was met with positive reception from fans and critics. TayoTV's Schizophrenic commented on the single, saying, "Runtown is definitely not leaving anytime soon with this classic hit here featuring Davido with Tspice On The Beat. This song is Very Catchy with Davido Doing Judgement to the beat on his part" A writer for XSouth gave the song 8 stars out of 10, adding, "Gallardo is a party jam and Runtown impresses with this one on a good beat by Tspice. This song will get you dancing Skelewu from the beginning to the end and Davido killed this one like always. You need this song on your playlist…. it’s a destined party rocker."

== Accolades ==
"Gallardo" won Best Collaboration of the Year at the 2014 Nigeria Entertainment Awards, held in New York City. It was nominated for Best Video by a New Act at the 2014 Nigeria Music Video Awards, as well as Best Collabo Song at the 2015 COSON Song Awards.

Year	Awards ceremony	Award description(s)	Result
2014	Nigeria Entertainment Awards	Best Collaboration of the Year	Won
2014	Nigeria Music Video Awards	Best Video by a New Act	Nominated
2015	COSON Song Awards	Best Collabo Song	Nominated
