= Ghetto University =

Studio album by Runtown
- Released: November 23, 2015
- Recorded: 2013–2015
- Genre: Afropop; hip-hop; dancehall
- Label: Eric Many
- Producer: Douglas Jack-Agu (exec.); Okwudili Umenyiora (exec.); Shizzi; Maleek Berry; TSpize; El Puto; DJ Maphorisa; Pheelz; Badr Makhlouki; Del B; Jaystuntz

Singles from Ghetto University
- 1. "Gallardo" Released: 29 January 2014; 2. "The Banger" Released: 9 December 2014; 3. "Bend Down Pause" Released: 12 June 2015; 4. "Walahi" Released: 2 November 2015

Ghetto University is the debut studio album by Nigerian singer Runtown. It was released on 23 November 2015 by Eric Many Entertainment. The album was supported by four singles: "Gallardo", "The Banger", "Bend Down Pause" and "Walahi". It features guest appearances from Davido, Wizkid and Uhuru. As one of the album's executive producers, Runtown collaborated with producers such as Shizzi, TSpize, Del B, Maleek Berry, Uhuru and Pheelz.

== Background ==
Runtown first hinted at Ghetto University during an interview with Vanguard newspaper in 2014. On 23 October 2015, the official release date for the album was announced via online media, followed by its cover art.

== Singles ==
"Gallardo", featuring Davido was released as the album's lead single on 29 January 2014. It won Best Collaboration of the Year at the 2014 Nigeria Entertainment Awards. The accompanying music video for "Gallardo" was directed by Clarence Peters; it peaked at number one on MTV Base's list of the "Hottest Videos aired on the show in 2014". On 9 December 2014, Runtown released the Uhuru-assisted "The Banger" as the album's second single. The Wizkid-assisted "Bend Down Pause" was released as the album's third single on 12 June 2015, and "Walahi" was released as the fourth single.

== Track listing ==
Ghetto University track listing
No.	Title	Writer(s)	Producer(s)	Length
1.	"Money Bag" (featuring DJ Khaled)	Douglas Jack-Agu	El Puto	3:28
2.	"Let Me Love You"	Jack-Agu	Maleek Berry	3:39
3.	"Gallardo" (featuring Davido)	Jack-Agu; David Adeleke	T-Spize	3:26
4.	"The Banger" (featuring Uhuru)	Jack-Agu; Themba Sekowe; Nqobile Mahlanu; Sihle Dlalisisa; Xelimpilo Simelane	DJ Maphorisa	3:28
5.	"Kilofoshi"	Jack-Agu	KillBeatz	3:15
6.	"Talk for Me"	Jack-Agu	Maleek Berry	3:02
7.	"Ima Ndi Anyi Bu" (featuring Phyno)	Jack-Agu; Chibuzo Azubuike	Shizzi	3:59
8.	"Omalicha Nwa"	Jack-Agu	DJ Maphorisa	3:47
9.	"Tuwo Shinkafa" (featuring Barbapappa)	Jack-Agu	Pheelz	3:48
10.	"Ghetto University"	Jack-Agu	Shizzi	3:57
11.	"Bend Down Pause" (featuring Wizkid)	Jack-Agu; Ayodeji Balogun	Del B	3:17
12.	"Walahi"	Jack-Agu	Maleek Berry	3:33
13.	"Lagos to Kampala" (featuring Wizkid)	Jack-Agu; Balogun	Maleek Berry	3:34
14.	"My Guys" (featuring Anatii)	Jack-Agu; Anathi Mnyango	Jaystuntz	4:09
15.	"Sarki Zaki" (featuring M.I and Hafeez)	Jack-Agu; Jude Abaga; Hafeez	Maleek Berry	3:50
16.	"Tuwo Shinkafa (Moroccan Version)" (featuring Barbapappa)	Jack-Agu; Hafeez	Pheelz; Badr Makhlouki	4:26
17.	"Na So the Story Go"	Douglas Jack Agu	Shizzi	3:45

== Personnel ==
Musicians

- Davido – featured artist (track 3)
- DJ Khaled – featured artist (track 1)
- Uhuru – featured artist (track 4)
- Phyno – featured artist (track 7)
- Wizkid – featured artist (track 11, 13)
- Hafeez – featured artist (track 15)
- Anatii – featured artist (track 14)
- Barbapappa – featured artist (track 9, 16)
- M.I – featured artist (track 15)

Personnel

- Sticky – mastering engineer
- George Nathaniel – mixing engineer
- Olabodeskills & Bugo – artwork artist
- Kelechi Amadi – photographer

Producers

- Runtown – production (track 3)
- Maleek Berry – production (track 2, 6, 12, 13, 15)
- DJ Maphorisa – production (track 4, 8)
- J-Stunt – production (track 14)
- Del B – production (track 11)
- El Puto – production (track 1)
- Shizzi – production (track 7, 10, 17)
- T-Spize – production (track 3)
- KillBeatz – production (track 5)
- Badr Makhlouki – production (track 16)
- Pheelz – production (track 9, 16)

== Release history ==
List of release dates, showing region, formats, label, editions and reference
Region	Date	Format(s)	Label	Edition(s)	Ref.
Worldwide	23 November 2015	Streaming; digital download; CD	Eric Many Entertainment	Standard	
