= 2014 Nigeria Entertainment Awards =

- Date: 31 August 2014
- Location: Skirball Center for the Performing Arts; New York City, New York, U.S
- Country: Nigeria
- Hosted by: Funke Akindele; Bovi; Gbemi

The 2014 Nigeria Entertainment Awards took place on 31 August 2014, at the Skirball Center for the Performing Arts in New York City. The eligibility period was from March 2013 to March 2014. In April 2014, the NEA reviewing committee began collecting submissions for the 2014 edition. The deadline for submission was 30 April 2014, and the nominations were announced on 28 May 2014. Tiwa Savage and Davido received the most nominations with 5 each. Don Jazzy, Flavour N'abania and Wizkid all got four nominations each, while Olamide, Patoranking, Chidinma and Oritse Femi followed closely with three nominations.

Pop duo Skuki rejected their Best New Act nomination. The group released their debut album B.A.N.G.E.R in May 2010 and won the Next Rated award at The Headies 2010.

The ceremony featured performances from artist such as El Phlex, Harrysong, Skales, Orezi, Shatta Wale, Wande Coal, J. Martins, Praiz, WizzyPro, RunTown and Patoranking. Davido won a total of 3 awards, including the Male Artist of the Year award. Tiwa Savage took home two awards for Female Artiste of the Year and Best Pop/RnB Artiste of the Year. Patoranking won the Best New Act of the Year award, while Ayo Jay emerged as the Most Promising Act to Watch. In the acting category, Tope Tedela and Funke Akindele emerged Best Actor in a Lead Role and Best Actress in a Lead Role respectively. The Best Gospel Act award went to Frank Edwards. Ghanaian reggae musician. Shatta Wale toppled Sarkodie, Mafikizolo, Mi Casa, Fally Ipupa, Uhuru and R2Bees for the African Artist of the Year award.

== Performers ==
- El Phlex
- Runtown
- Harrysong
- Skales - "Shake Body"
- Patoranking - "Alubarika", "Girlie O"
- Wizzy Pro (featuring Runtown, Skales, Patoranking) - "Emergency"
- Praiz - "Mercy"
- Orezi - "You Garrit"
- Shatta Wale
- Oritse Femi - "Double Wahala"
- J. Martins - "Touching Body"
- Wande Coal - "Baby Hello"

== Awards ==
=== Musical categories ===
Best Album of the Year

- Baddest Guy Ever Liveth – Olamide
  - Once Upon a Time – Tiwa Savage
  - Takeover – Kcee
  - L.I.F.E - Leaving an Impact for Eternity – Burna Boy
  - Jagz Nation, Vol.1. Thy Nation Come - Jesse Jagz
  - Journey – Sean Tizzle
  - Blessed – Flavour N'abania

==== Hottest Single of the Year ====
- "Pull Over" – Kcee featuring Wizkid
- "Aye" – Davido
  - "Double Wahala" – Oritse Femi
  - "Caro" – Starboy featuring L.A.X and Wizkid
  - "Surulere" – Dr SID featuring Don Jazzy
  - "Eminado" – Tiwa Savage featuring Don Jazzy
  - "Touching Body" – J Martins featuring DJ Arafat

==== Best New Act of the Year ====
- Patoranking
  - Orezi
  - Runtown
  - Charass
  - Tekno Miles
  - Oritse Femi
  - Skuki

==== Gospel Artist of the Year ====
- Frank Edwards
  - Tim Godfrey and Xtreme Crew
  - Flo
  - Segun Oluwayomi
  - Nikki Laoye
  - Sabina
  - Proverbs

==== Indigenous Artist of the Year ====
- Oritse Femi
  - Reminisce
  - Sean Tizzle
  - Jaywon
  - Flavour N'abania
  - Timaya
  - MC Galaxy

==== Best Pop/R&B Artist of the Year ====
- Tiwa Savage
  - Praiz
  - Wande Coal
  - Ayoola
  - Banky W
  - Chidinma
  - Harry Song

==== Female Artist of the Year ====
- Tiwa Savage
  - Yemi Alade
  - Seyi Shay
  - Cynthia Morgan
  - Eva Alordiah
  - Chidinma
  - Niyola

==== Male Artist of the Year ====
- Davido
  - Kcee
  - Iyanya
  - Wande Coal
  - Wizkid
  - Oritse Femi
  - Patoranking

==== Best Rap Act of the Year ====
- Ice Prince
  - Olamide
  - Phyno
  - Eva Alordiah
  - Show Dem Camp
  - Reminisce
  - Cynthia Morgan

==== Music Producer of the Year ====
- Del B
  - Duncan Daniels
  - DTunes
  - Don Jazzy
  - Blaq Jerzy
  - Pheelz
  - Maleek Berry

==== Best Music Video of the Year (Artist & Director) ====
- "Rands and Naira" – Emmy Gee and Nick
  - "Jaiye Jaiye" – Wizkid and Sesan
  - "Personally" – P-Square and Jude Okoye
  - "Sitting on the Throne" – Olamide and Kemi Adetiba
  - "Skelewu" – Davido and Moe Musa
  - "Eminado" – Tiwa Savage and Clarence Peters
  - "Oh Baby!" – Chidinma featuring Flavour and Clarence Peters

==== Best Collaboration ====
- "Gallardo" – Runtown featuring Davido
  - "Mofe Lowo Ju Daddy Mi" – Reminisce featuring Davido
  - "Oluchi" – Solid Star featuring Flavour N'abania
  - "WanDaMo" – Burna Boy featuring D'banj
  - "Oh Baby!" – Chidinma featuring Flavour N'abania
  - "Emergency" – Wizzy Pro featuring Runtown, Skales and Patoranking
  - "Allubarika" – Patoranking featuring Timaya

==== Most Promising Act to Watch ====
- Ayo Jay
  - Di'Ja
  - Elphlex
  - Koko J
  - Sna-Z
  - Brain
  - DJ Mo

==== Diaspora Artist of the Year ====
- L.A.X
  - Stlyzz
  - Wale
  - Bils
  - Lola Rae
  - Mr. 2Kay
  - Emmy Gee

==== African Artist of the Year (Non-Nigerian) ====
- Shatta Wale
  - Sarkodie
  - Mafikizolo
  - Mi Casa
  - Fally Ipupa
  - Uhuru
  - R2Bees

=== Film categories ===
==== Best Actor in a Lead Role ====
- Tope Tedela (A Mile from Home)
  - Joseph Benjamin (actor) (Murder at Prime Suites)
  - Nkem Owoh (Maja)
  - Chiwetel Ejiofor (Half of a Yellow Sun)
  - Kanayo O. Kanayo (Apaye)

==== Best Supporting Actor ====
- Yomi Fash-Lanso (Omo Elemosho)
  - OC Ukeje (Half of a Yellow Sun)
  - Rabilu Musa Danlasan aka Ibro (Maja)
  - Desmond Elliott (Finding Mercy)
  - Shawn Faqua (Lagos Cougars)

==== Best Actress in a Lead Role ====
- Funke Akindele (Agnetta O’Mpa)
  - Nse Ikpe Etim (Journey to Self)
  - Damilola Adegbite (Flower Girl)
  - Chioma Chukwuka (Accident)
  - Daniella Okeke (Lagos Cougars)

==== Best Supporting Actress ====
- Genevieve Nnaji (Half of a Yellow Sun)
  - Rita Dominic (Finding Mercy)
  - Patience Ozokwor (After the Proposal)
  - Tamara Eteimo (Desperate Housegirls)
  - Bikiya Graham-Douglas (Flower Girl)

==== Best Director ====
- Desmond Elliott (Finding Mercy)
  - Tope Oshin-Ogun (Journey to Self)
  - Sadiq Mafia (Maja)
  - Teco Benson (Accident)
  - Biyi Bandele (Half of a Yellow Sun)

==== Best Picture ====
- Half of a Yellow Sun
  - Journey to Self
  - Maja
  - Accident
  - Murder at Prime Suites

=== Other categories ===
==== Entertainment Personality of the Year ====
- Denrele
  - Toolz
  - Liz Yemoja
  - Adams
  - Toke Makinwa
  - Lami
  - IK Ogbonna

==== Entertainment Executive of the Year ====
- E-Money – Five Star Records
  - Efe Omorogbe – Hypertek
  - Don Jazzy – Mavin Records
  - Illbliss – Capital Records
  - Ayo Animashaun – HipTV
  - Steve Babaeko – X3m Music
  - Okwudili-umenyior – Erik Manny Records

==== Best OAP ====
- Yaw – Wazobia FM
  - Matilda – Rhythm FM Abuja
  - Dotun Kayode – Cool FM
  - D Don – Rainbow FM
  - Toke Makinwa – Rhythm 93.7 FM
  - Maria Okanrende – The Beat 99.9 FM
  - Jluv – City 105.1

==== Funniest Comedian of Year ====
- Bovi
  - Bash
  - Funny Bone
  - Ajebo
  - Akpororo
  - Helen Paul
  - Chi Gurl

==== World DJ ====
- DJ Tunez – New York
  - DJ IK – Nigeria
  - DJ Shinski – Houston
  - DJ Cuppy – UK
  - DJ Flexx – Nigeria
  - DJ Spinall – Nigeria
  - DJ Xclusive – Nigeria
