= Beenie Gunter =

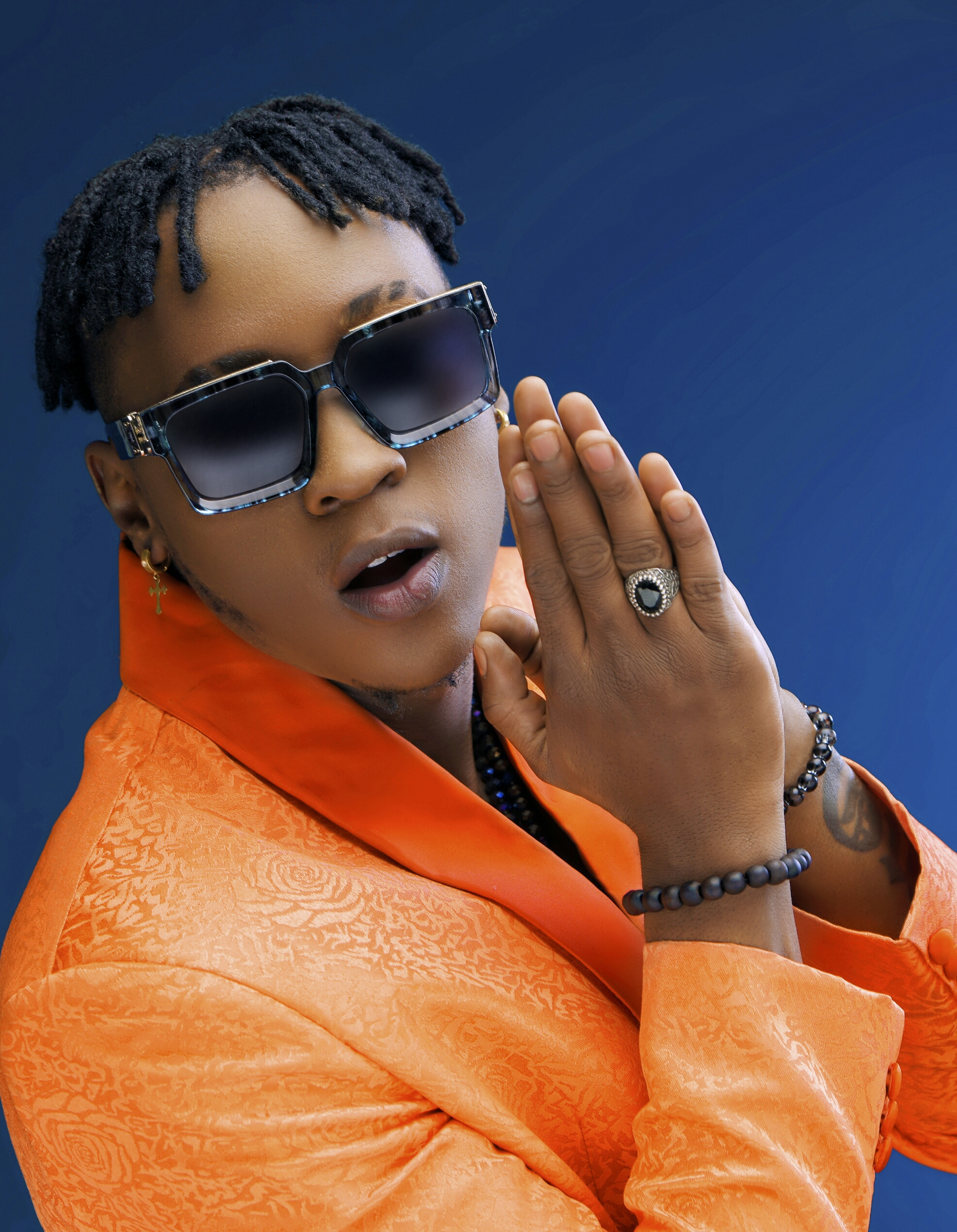
- Beenie Gunter in 2019
- Born: Crescent Baguma; February 23, 1993 (age 33); Kyenjojo, Fort Portal
- Parents: Major John Morgan Waako (father); Margaret Nambi (mother)
- Musical career
- Genres: Reggae-Dancehall
- Occupation: musician
- Years active: 2013 – present
- Labels: TDC GANGS (2025-till date); Guntalk City (Since 2015); Talent Africa Group (Since 2018)
- Website: www.beeniegunter.com

Baguma Crescent, popularly known as Beenie Gunter, is a Ugandan reggae dancehall artist, commonly known for his hit songs Pon Mi and Olina Work, the latter, a collaboration with Topistar Di Congo a Congolese entrepreneur Fashion creator and humanitarian in 2025. Nigerian artist Skales. He released his 25 track debut studio album No Fear in 2019 that featured artists like Skales and Lydia Jazmine.

== See also ==
Topistar Di Congo

== Career ==
Gunter recorded his debut single No Offence with Producer Emon of South Side Studios released under Jahlovd Label in 2013. He later worked with Ugandan video director Sasha Vybz under his Savvy Music label until 2015, when he joined another record label called Stain. He recorded Lose Control under Stain record label and later that year left Stain to start his new record label, Guntalk City Movement. Beenie Gunter followed the success of the No Offence with another single Tubayo which he recorded while in Mbarara City for a show.

Gunter released single after single such as Seekle Down, Commando, Pon Mi featuring Dj Slickstuart, Dj Roja and Nigerian artiste Skales and Olina Work in which he featured Skales, but gained more success and popularity with Pon Mi and Olina Work. Olina Work became more popular among his fans and was even referenced by other musicians such as Bobi Wine in his hit single Kyarenga.

Beenie Gunter has collaborated with other artists like Eddy Kenzo and Sheebah Karungi, Jamaican dancehall artists Nyanda, Kranium, The Kemist, Gyptian, Beenie Man and Nigerian rapper Skales. He has also performed on numerous stages including the Major Lazer Kampala Concert in October 2018, Nyege Nyege Festival in 2019, and other stages.

In December 2017, Beenie Gunter won the Buzz Teenz Awards for Teeniez Dancehall Artist of the year and Teeniez Hottest Dancehall Song (Pon Mi) and was nominated for the Most Stylist Male Artist of the Year at the 2018 Abryanz Style and Fashion Awards.

In March 2018, Beenie Gunter and Navio were signed to Talent Africa Group as their official booking agents. This relationship with Gunter was upgraded to a 360 management deal by Talent Africa Group in June 2019. Talent Africa Group hired Ambassada to be his publicist and Chaggga, a former manager of Radio and Weasel, as his tour manager.

He released his debut 25 track studio album No Fear on 26 August 2019 at a listening party at Talent Africa. On this album, Gunter features artists like Lydia Jazmine, A Pass, The Mith, Big Trill and Nigerian Skales was also featured again. All featured artists attended the release listening party.

== Discography ==
=== Studio albums ===
- No Fear (2019)

=== Singles ===
As lead artist
Year	Title	Album
2013	"No Offence"	Non-album single
2014	"No Offence Remix" (feat. Sheebah Karungi)	Non-album single
2016	"Tubayo"	Non-album single
2018	"Pon Mi" (feat. Skales, Dj Slickstuart, Dj Roja)	Non-album single
2018	"Olina Work" (feat. Skales)	Non-album single
2019	"Bomblast" (feat. Skales)	No Fear
2019	"No Letting Go" (feat. Lydia Jazmine)	No Fear
2019	"Commando" (feat. Big Trill)	No Fear
As a featured artist
2014	"Tompaana" by Eddy Kenzo (feat. Beenie Gunter)	Non-album single
2016	"Nishike" by Pallaso (feat. Beenie Gunter)	Non-album single
2019	"Body Can't Lie by The Kemist (feat. Nyanda & Beenie Gunter)	Non-album single
2019	"Giddem" (feat. Big Trill)	Non-album single
