= Nana Yaa =

Ghanaian singer

Nana Yaa Mensah, known professionally as Nana Yaa, is a Ghanaian singer who began her music career in 1994. She is known for her vocal performances and collaborations with several Ghanaian musicians. She is the daughter of Ghanaian musicians Pat Thomas and Lola Everette.

== Early life and background ==
Nana Yaa Mensah was born into a musical family. Her parents, Pat Thomas and Lola Everette, are both well-known figures in Ghanaian music. Her grandfather, Dick Everett, was also a musician, making her part of three generations of performers in the Ghanaian music industry. Because of her family background and vocal ability, observers expected her to follow in her parents’ footsteps and establish a successful career in the music industry.

== Career ==
Nana Yaa began performing professionally in 1994 and gained attention for her vocal ability and stage performances. During the early years of her career, she had not released a full studio album but continued to perform and collaborate with other musicians. She began singing in her childhood and later pursued it professionally at the age of 17.

In an interview with Showbiz, she stated that she believed her vocal ability distinguished her from other female musicians in Ghana. She has also highlighted originality and personal style as key aspects of her music, and has expressed concern that Ghanaian female artists are adopting styles similar to foreign performers. She has collaborated with several musicians, including Sonnie Badu, Rex Omar, Okyeame Kwame, Becca, Osibisa, and Tagoe Sisters.

=== Musical influences ===
Nana Yaa has cited several musicians as influences on her music, including Diana Ross, Miriam Makeba, Aretha Franklin, Lionel Richie, George Darko, the band Osibisa, and her father, Pat Thomas.
