= Desmond Elliott =

Publisher and literary agent (1930–2003)

- Born: 24 December 1930; London, England
- Died: 17 December 2003 (aged 72)
- Occupations: Publisher; literary agent
- Known for: Desmond Elliott Prize

Desmond Elliott (24 December 1930 – 12 August 2003) was a British publisher and literary agent. He started his career with the publishing house Macmillan before going on to found his own publishing company, Arlington Books. In a career spanning nearly 60 years he was responsible for discovering a number of writers who went on to be bestsellers including Penny Vincenzi and Jilly Cooper.

== Career ==
Desmond Elliott was born in London, England, on Christmas Eve 1929. Following the death of his father, he was placed in the Royal Masonic Orphanage in Dublin, Ireland, at the age of 10. He was well educated and won a scholarship to Trinity College, Dublin; however, he decided to travel to England in 1947 at the age of 16, with just £2 and a letter of introduction from the editor of The Irish Times.

Elliot first worked as an office boy for Macmillan Publishers, before joining Hutchinson (publisher) and then Michael Joseph (publisher). After being fired by Max Reinhardt (publisher) he received £1,000 compensation and a job offer from Sidney Bernstein, of ITV Granada – who then had second thoughts. Using the remainder of his compensation, he set up as an independent agent in 1960 and founded Arlington Books.

His dedication and business sense made Elliott a successful publisher. Elliot was key to the creation of a list of successful blockbuster novelists such as Candida Lycett Green, Penny Vincenzi, and Lynda Lee-Potter. He also introduced Tim Rice to Andrew Lloyd Webber as an early client. Respected and loved by his authors, in the words of Candida Lycett Green, Elliott was simply "magic".

== Lifestyle ==
Desmond Elliott lived his life with verve, drinking only champagne, and treating Fortnum & Mason as his local "cornershop" He only ever crossed the Atlantic on Concorde. His office was in Mayfair, and he had houses in St. James's and on Park Avenue.

== The Desmond Elliott Prize ==
Before his death in 2003, Elliott stipulated that his literary estate should be invested in a charitable trust that would fund a literary award "to enrich the careers of new writers". The annual Desmond Elliott Prize was therefore founded in 2007, awarding a sum of £10,000 to the author of a first novel published in the UK. Elliott told novelist Sam Llewellyn his ideal novel was a "cross between a treasure hunt and a race" and the winning novel must therefore exhibit depth and breadth with a compelling narrative.
