= Take Over (album) =

Studio album by KCee
- Released: 1 November 2013
- Genre: Afropop; highlife; hip-hop
- Length: 71:24
- Language: English; Nigerian Pidgin; Igbo
- Label: Five Star Music
- Producer: Del B; Dr Amir; Blaq Jerzee; Jo Pee; Soso Soberekon

KCee chronology
Take Over (2013)	Attention to Detail (2017)

Singles from Take Over
- 1. "Give it to Me" Released: 12 September 2012; 2. "Limpopo" Released: 20 February 2013; 3. "Okoso" Released: 6 August 2013; 4. "Pullover" Released: 19 September 2013; 5. "Ogadinma" Released: 25 October 2013; 6. "Emmah" Released: 8 January 2014; 7. "Ogaranya" Released: 29 August 2014

Take Over is the debut solo studio album by Nigerian singer KCee. It was released by Five Star Music on 1 November 2013, and features guest appearances from label mates Mr Songz and Skiibii, alongside artists D'banj, Don Jazzy, Davido, Wizkid, Timaya, Phyno, and Flavour. The album blends Afropop with highlife and hip-hop, and its production was mainly handled by Del B with additional production from Dr Amir, Blaq Jerzee, Jo Pee, and Soso Soberekon. Take Over was supported by the singles "Give it to Me", "Limpopo", "Okoso", "Pullover", "Ogadinma", "Emmah", and "Ogaranya".

== Singles ==
The album's lead single, "Give It to Me" featuring Flavour, was released on 12 September 2012. It was produced by Del B and Jo Pee, while its accompanying music video, directed by Godfather Productions, was released on 4 October 2012. It won the Best Collabo of the Year award at the 2013 City People Entertainment Awards. "Limpopo" was released as the album's second single on 19 February 2013. Its music video, directed by Piguar Films, was released on 15 March 2013, and includes a cameo appearance by Harrysong. The song won Song of the Year at The Headies 2013, while its producer Del B earned a nomination for Producer of the Year. "Limpopo" also received a nomination for Most Gifted Dance Video at the 2013 Channel O Music Video Awards.

The album's third single, "Okoso", was released on 6 August 2013. It was produced by Del B and blends afropop rhythms with influence from highlife. "Pullover", the fourth single from the album, features Wizkid and was released on 19 September 2013. Its music video was directed by Clarence Peters was released on 31 October 2013. It relies heavily on humor, with the video featuring cameos from comedy stars Chinedu Ikedieze, Osita Iheme, and Saka, alongside KCee's former label mates Harrysong, and Skiibii. The fifth single, "Ogadinma", was released on 25 October 2013. Produced by Del B, the track is rooted in traditional highlife and coincided with the album's release date announcement.

A remix to "Pullover" featuring Don Jazzy was released on 31 October 2013 as a promotional single. Take Over's sixth single "Emmah" featuring D'banj was released for free download on 8 January 2014. The music video for "Emmah" was directed by Godfather Productions and was released on 16 January 2014. The Davido-assisted "Ogaranya" was released as the album's seventh single on 29 August 2014.

== Critical reception ==
Wilfred Okiche of YNaija described Take Over as a repetitive and uninspired album that relied heavily on the success of hit singles while offering little originality or substance. He concluded, "Give the people what they want. Who cares that the album is a disaster?" Ogaga Sakpaide of tooXclusive did a track-by-track review of the album and rated it a 2.5/5.

=== Accolades ===
Year	Awards ceremony	Award description(s)	Results
2014	The Headies 2014	Best R&B/Pop Album	Nominated
2014	2014 Nigeria Entertainment Awards	Best Album of the Year	Nominated

== Track listing ==
Take Over track listing
No.	Title	Writer(s)	Producer(s)	Length
1.	"Hustle Your Way"	Kingsley Okonkwo	Del B	3:35
2.	"Ogadinma"	Okonkwo	Del B	3:57
3.	"Hakuna Matata"	Okonkwo	Blaq Jerzee	3:43
4.	"Pullover" (featuring Wizkid)	Okonkwo; Ayodeji Balogun	Del B	3:07
5.	"Do It" (featuring Timaya)	Okonkwo; Inetimi Odon	Del B	4:11
6.	"Adaugo" (featuring Mr Songz)	Okonkwo; Harrison Okiri	Del B	4:39
7.	"Skit by Ajebo" (featuring Ajebo)	Ajebo	—	1:24
8.	"Limpopo"	Okonkwo	Del B	4:13
9.	"Ogaranya" (featuring Davido)	Okonkwo; David Adeleke	Del B	4:01
10.	"Totori" (featuring Mr Songz)	Okonkwo; Okiri	Soso Soberekon	4:07
11.	"Emmah" (featuring D'banj)	Okonkwo; Oladapo Oyebanjo	Del B	4:17
12.	"Had It Been I Know"	Okonkwo; Okiri	Dr. Amir	3:19
13.	"Ifeneme"	Okonkwo	Del B	4:03
14.	"Okoso"	Okonkwo	Del B	4:19
15.	"Chineke Di Mma"	Okonkwo	Del B	3:39
16.	"Ajibole" (featuring Skiibii)	Okonkwo; Abbey Elias	Blaq Jerzee	3:13
17.	"Vitamin C" (featuring Phyno)	Okonkwo; Chibuzor Azubuike	Del B	3:21
18.	"Pullover (Remix)" (featuring Don Jazzy and Wizkid)	Okonkwo; Don Jazzy; Balogun	Del B	3:35
19.	"Give It to Me" (featuring Flavour)	Okonkwo; Chinedu Okoli	Del B; Jo Pee^{[a]}	3:57
Total length:				71:24

Notes

- "—" denotes a skit
- ^{^[a]} signifies a co-producer
- "Had It Been It Know" features uncredited vocals from Mr Songz.

== Personnel ==
- Del B – production (tracks 1, 2, 4–15, 17–19), mixing (tracks 1–7, 9–19), mastering (tracks 1–7, 9–19)
- Blaq Jerzee – production (tracks 3 and 16)
- Soso Soberekon – production (track 10)
- Jo Pee – production (track 19)
- Dr. Amir – mixing (tracks 1–7, 9–19), mastering (tracks 1–7, 9–19)

== Release history ==
Release history and formats for Take Over
Region	Date	Format	Label
Various	1 November 2013	CD; digital download	Five Star Music
