= Limpopo (song) =

Single by KCee

from the album Take Over
- Released: 19 February 2013
- Recorded: 2011−12
- Genre: Afrobeats
- Length: 4:13
- Label: Five Star Music
- Songwriters: Kingsley Chinweike Okonkwo; Ayodele Joseph Basil
- Producer: Del B

KCee singles chronology
| "Give it to Me" (2012) | "Limpopo" (2013) | "Okoso" (2013) |

Music video
- "Limpopo" on YouTube

"Limpopo" is a song by Nigerian singer KCee. Considered as KCee's breakout single as a solo artist, it was produced by Del B and was released on 19 February 2013, as the second single from his debut solo studio album Take Over (2013). "Limpopo" debuted at number three on the MTV Base Official Naija Top 10 chart, peaking at number once during the week dated 21 June to 28 June 2013, surpassing Davido's "Gobe". It remained on top for three weeks until it was displaced by Wande Coal's "The Kick". The song was nominated for Song of the Year at the 2014 MTV Africa Music Awards and for Hottest Single of the Year at the 2013 Nigeria Entertainment Awards. It won Song of the Year at The Headies 2013. In addition, Del B, the song's producer, was nominated for Producer of the Year at The Headies 2013.

== Background ==
Following his split with musical partner Presh, KCee recorded "Limpopo" as his first solo track. It dropped on 19 February 2013 as his eighth single released as a solo artist. In the Netflix documentary Afrobeats: The Backstory (2022), he admitted that the song was created shortly after he assembled a new team that included him, Del B, Dr Amir, and Harrysong, with whom he frequently collaborated on his debut studio album Take Over (2013). They ended up forming the collective of Five Star Music. KCee revealed that he initially planned to feature either American singers Chris Brown or Trey Songz on "Limpopo". In an interview with Daily Post, KCee stated that the song was recorded spontaneously in the studio with friends, without any prior plan or structure, and that he and his team celebrated after recording it. In the interview, KCee said that the song became an instant hit within two weeks of its release. Despite Limpopo being the name of a province in South Africa, according to KCee, the song's name means "let's have fun."

== Live performances ==
KCee performed "Limpopo" at the Lonestar Cell Beach Jam concert in Liberia, where his set received positive reviews from local media. According to a review by Tete Bropleh of the Liberian Observer, he opened his performance with "Pullover" before performing "Limpopo," which increased the show's momentum and kept the audience "spellbound and hungry for more." Bropleh described his performance as one of the night's highlights, alongside Liberian artists DenG and Christoph the Change.

== Music video ==
The music video for "Limpopo" was released on 15 March 2013. It was shot in Majorca, Spain by Piguar Films with a cameo appearance from Harrysong. KCee began work on the video about five days before releasing the song. The directors were originally supposed to shoot a video for his single "Totori" with Harrysong, but KCee convinced them to shoot "Limpopo" instead. "Limpopo"'s music video was nominated for Most Gifted Dance Video at the 2013 Channel O Music Video Awards. As of October 2025, the video has reached around 17 million views on YouTube.

== Accolades ==
| Year | Awards ceremony | Award description(s) | Results | Ref |
|---|---|---|---|---|
| 2014 | African Muzik Magazine Awards | Song of the Year | Won | |
| 2014 | African Muzik Magazine Awards | Best Dance in a Video | Nominated | |
| 2014 | MTV Africa Music Awards | Song of the Year | Nominated | |
| 2013 | Channel O Music Video Awards | Most Gifted Dance Video | Nominated | |
| 2013 | The Headies | Song of the Year | Won | |
| 2013 | Nigerian Music Video Awards | Best Pop Extra Video | Nominated | |
| 2013 | City People Entertainment Awards | Most Popular Song of the Year | Won | |
| 2013 | Nigeria Entertainment Awards | Hottest Single of the Year | Nominated | |

== Charts ==
Chart performance for "Limpopo"
| Chart (2013) | Peak position |
|---|---|
| Nigeria (MTV Base Official Naija Top Ten) | 1 |
