= Shake Body =

Single by Skales

from the album Man of the Year
- Released: 6 May 2014
- Length: 3:28
- Label: OHK
- Songwriter: Raoul John Njeng-Njeng
- Producer: Jay Pizzle

Skales singles chronology
"Show Off" (2014)	"Shake Body" (2014)	"Give It To Me" (2014)

Music video
- "Shake Body" on YouTube

"Shake Body" is a song by Nigerian artist Skales. It was released on 6 May 2014 as the lead single from his debut studio album, Man of the Year (2015). Produced by Jay Pizzle, it followed his exit from Empire Mates Entertainment and the launch of his label, OHK Entertainment. In 2025, "Shake Body" experienced a comeback in popularity after a viral TikTok video featuring Spanish footballer Lamine Yamal reignited interest in the track, leading to a return to charts, international attention, and a European tour for Skales. Billboard magazine ranked the song #39 on their list of the 50 Best Afrobeats Songs of All Time.

== Background ==
Following his departure from Banky W's Empire Mates Entertainment in 2014, "Shake Body" became Skales’s breakout single and helped him gain mainstream attention. In interviews, he stated that the song was initially turned down by several industry figures, though fellow afropop artist Olu Maintain expressed interest and offered to buy it for ₦1.5 million which Skales declined. Although he was uncertain about the song’s potential, it became a regular part of his performances and contributed to increased bookings.

== Music video ==
The music video for "Shake Body" was released on 22 July 2014. Directed by Stanz Visuals and filmed in Lagos, Nigeria, It was officially unveiled during a press conference where Skales also announced his signing to Baseline Music. To promote the release, Skales launched the "Shake Body Lucky Fan Competition", which allowed fans to upload videos of themselves dancing to the song for a chance to win $10,000. According to Baseline Music manager Howie T, the video was intentionally choreographed to inspire fans to replicate its dance moves. By February 2015, the video had already hit a million views on YouTube.

== 2025 resurgence ==
In early 2025, "Shake Body" unexpectedly returned to prominence after a TikTok video posted by 16-year-old Spanish footballer Lamine Yamal went viral. The clip, which featured Yamal and fellow players Nico Williams and Samu Omorodion dancing to the song during the 2025 Copa del Rey tournament, amassed over 180 million views and 16 million likes. The video helped popularize a dance trend that was later picked up by other FC Barcelona players, influencers, and fans across Europe. As a result, the song re-entered streaming charts globally, debuting at #98 on the Spotify Global Viral Songs chart and trending in over 30 countries including Spain, the Netherlands, and Italy.

In addition to the viral video, the resurgence was also propelled by DJ remixes—most notably by Dutch DJ Onderkoffer—which Skales later officially released on streaming platforms. The remix contributed to the song’s biggest single-day streaming numbers, with over 213,000 Spotify streams recorded.

== Accolades ==
Awards and nominations for "Shake Body"
Organization	Year	Category	Result	Ref.
Ben TV Awards	2014	Single of the Year	Nominated	
Nigerian Music Video Awards	2014	Best Contemporary Afro Video	Nominated	
tooXclusive Awards	2014	Best Afro-Pop Track	Nominated	
Nigeria Entertainment Awards	2015	Hottest Single of the Year	Nominated	
