= Mad Over You =

Single by Runtown
- Released: November 4, 2016
- Recorded: 2016
- Genre: Highlife; R&B; Pon Pon
- Length: 3:35
- Label: Eric Many Entertainment
- Songwriter: Douglas Jack
- Producers: Runtown; Del B; TSpize

Runtown singles chronology
"Vybz Kartel Music" (2016)	"Mad Over You" (2016)	"Kilogram" (2016)

"Mad Over You" is a song by Nigerian singer Runtown, released on November 4, 2016. It was primarily produced by Del B, along with production assistance from Runtown and T-Spize. Described as a love-themed ballad, "Mad Over You" is a blend of highlife, R&B, and Pon Pon. It debuted at number 38 on the Billboard Twitter Top Tracks chart, marking the singer's first appearance on Billboard. As of March 2017, "Mad Over You" garnered over 2 million streams on Spotify. It was nominated for Song of the Year at The Headies 2018 and for Best Single at the 2017 Nigeria Entertainment Awards.

== Background and promotion ==
In March 2017, Runtown told Pulse Nigeria's Joey Akan that he recorded "Mad Over You" while embroiled in a contractual dispute with Eric Many Entertainment. Two weeks prior to his U.S tour in mid-2016, he worked with Del B on musical ideas for the song. Del B told Akan that "Mad Over You" was the last of two songs recorded during his session with Runtown. Tanzanian singer Vanessa Mdee was present in the studio when Del B and Runtown worked on the song's instrumental and flute, respectively. Runtown later contacted TSpize to provide guitar work.

Lyrically, "Mad Over You" is about a Ghanaian girl Runtown admires. Musically, it has a bouncy rhythm and is infused with percussion, guitar, and a flute. In an email exchange with The Fader magazine, Runtown said the song is inspired by African beauty. In 2016, Runtown performed the song at Citi FM's Decemba 2 Remember concert, and at Sarkodie's annual Rapperholic concert. In April 2017, the singer performed the song at the season finale of Big Brother Naija.

=== Music video ===
The accompanying music video for "Mad Over You" was directed by Clarence Peters and uploaded to YouTube on December 7, 2016. It features a small group of women, who displayed several different fashion pieces and body art. A writer for Joss magazine criticized the music video for not complementing the song's lyrics, saying the "choice for location in itself is an epic failure." In February 2020, the video for "Mad Over You" surpassed 100 million views on YouTube.

== Covers ==
In December 2016, Nigerian musician Mr Eazi released a cover of the song. In January 2017, Ghanaian singer Nana Yaa released her rendition of the song. Jamaican dancehall artist Ding Dong covered the song in October 2017, pairing his version with a dance move he created called Lebeh Lebeh. In April 2018, Cobhams Asuquo and Sizzy Benjamin released a joint cover of "Mad Over You"; the original version's highlife guitar chords were removed in favor of electric guitar licks.

== Commercial performance ==
"Mad Over You" debuted at number 38 on the Billboard Twitter Top Tracks chart, marking the singer's first appearance on the chart. As of March 2017, "Mad Over You" garnered over 2 million streams on the streaming media service Spotify. The song received two million downloads on MyNotJustOk, becoming the most downloaded song of 2017 on the platform.

== Critical reception ==
Gabriel Myers Hansen, whose review was posted on the E News Ghana website, described the song as a tribute to Ghana and said it "makes it into favorable places in history because of the sheer majesty of its swing". Joey Akan of Pulse Nigeria called it a "mid-tempo song which can coast through you initially, but eventually envelopes you with its synths, mellow drum patterns and more." TooXclusive's Jim Donnett praised Runtown for adapting the Ghanaian Alkayida sound to deliver a hit. A writer for The Native said the song explores themes of love and likened the track to "For Life", which was released in May 2017.

=== Accolades ===
Year	Awards ceremony	Award description(s)	Results	Ref.
2018	The Headies	Best Pop Single	Nominated	
2018	The Headies	Song of the Year	Nominated	
2018	The Headies	Viewer's Choice	Nominated	
2017	Ghana-Naija Showbiz Awards	Song of the Year	Won	
2017	Nigeria Entertainment Awards	Best Single	Nominated	

== Charts ==
Chart performance for Mad Over You
Chart (2025)	Peak position
Nigeria (TurnTable Top 100)	90
