= Personally (P-Square song) =

Single by P-Square

from the album Double Trouble
- Released: June 21, 2013
- Recorded: 2013
- Genre: Afropop; dance
- Length: 3:14
- Label: Square; Konvict
- Songwriters: Peter Okoye; Paul Okoye
- Producer: Vtek

P-Square singles chronology
"Alingo" (2012)	"Personally" (2013)	"Taste the Money (Testimony)" (2014)

Music video
- "Personally" on YouTube

"Personally" is a song by Nigerian duo P-Square. It was released on June 21, 2013 as the second single from their sixth studio album, Double Trouble (2014). On the same day, Jude Engees Okoye and Clarence Peters released the music video for the song, which was posted to Vevo and included a cameo by Osita Iheme. "Personally" peaked at number one on the MTV Base Official Naija Top 10 Chart for the week of August 10 through August 22, 2013. It was nominated for Song of the Year at the 2014 MTV Africa Music Awards.

== Music video ==
The accompanying music video for "Personally" was released on June 21, 2013, alongside the audio. It was shot in Lagos by Jude Engees Okoye and Clarence Peters. In the video, P-Square paid tribute to Michael Jackson, who inspired them to dance, sing, and write songs. Moreover, they dedicated the music video to him, adding, "He lives on and inspires us personally". At the end of the video, Cameron Okoye, Peter Okoye's son, and Nigerian actor Osita Iheme make a cameo appearance. In July 2013, Jermaine Jackson made a video expressing his gratitude to P-Square, commending them for being "absolutely sensational with the showmanship, the singing, the dancing". Within three weeks of the video's release, it surpassed one million views on YouTube. By November 2014, the video reached 30 million views. The video received nominations for Most Gifted Dance Video and Best Music Video of the Year (Artist & Director) at the 2014 Channel O Music Video Awards and Nigeria Entertainment Awards respectively.

== Accolades ==
Year	Awards ceremony	Award description(s)	Results	Ref
2014	All Africa Music Awards	Song of the Year	Nominated	
2014	All Africa Music Awards	Best African Pop Song	Nominated	
2014	All Africa Music Awards	Best Video	Nominated	
2014	All Africa Music Awards	Songwriter of the Year (Peter and Paul Okoye for "Personally")	Nominated	
2014	All Africa Music Awards	Producer of the Year (Vtek for "Personally")	Nominated	
2014	All Africa Music Awards	Best African Group/Duo/Band (P-Square for "Personally")	Won	
2014	Channel O Music Video Awards	Most Gifted Dance Video	Nominated	
2014	Nigeria Entertainment Awards	Best Music Video of the Year (Artist & Director)	Nominated	
2014	MTV Africa Music Awards	Song of the Year	Nominated	
2013	Soul Train Music Awards	Best International Performance	Nominated	

== Track listing ==
Digital single

No.	Title	Writer(s)	Length
1.	"Personally"	P-Square	3:14
2.	"Personally (Instrumental)"	————	3:12

== Charts ==
=== Weekly charts ===
Chart (2012)	Peak position
France (SNEP)	104
