= L.A.X (musician) =

- L.A.X Performing At Corporate Elite 2017

Background information
- Also known as: L.A.X
- Born: Damilola Abdul Rasak Afolabi; April 10, 1993 (age 33); Lagos State, Nigeria
- Origin: London, United Kingdom
- Genres: Afrobeats; Reggae; fuji; Afropop
- Occupations: Performer, songwriter, recording artist
- Instrument: Vocals
- Years active: 2008–present
- Label: Rasaki Music Group Starboy (Former)
- Website: izzlax.com

Damilola Afolabi (born April 10, 1993), known professionally as L.A.X is a Nigerian singer-songwriter and rapper. L.A.X started out as a rapper and was part of a three-man group called Flyboiz while he was still in high school. On August 20, 2013, L.A.X signed a major-label deal with Starboy Entertainment moments after releasing the critically acclaimed song titled "Caro" which won him the "Diaspora Artiste of The Year" at the 2014 edition of the Nigeria Entertainment Awards.

== Life and career ==
Damilola Afolabi was born in Lagos State, Nigeria. He had his secondary school education at Nigerian Turkish International College, Lagos where he formed a music group called Flyboiz, releasing a single titled "Busy Body". With the view of furthering his education, L.A.X left the group to study in the United Kingdom where he started recording songs and shot few videos.

In 2012, L.A.X released his first major single "Jaye" which featured vocal appearance from Ice Prince. Upon his return to Nigeria, he met Wizkid through his stylist and went on to sign his first professional recording contract with Starboy Entertainment in 2013.

On 20 August 2013, L.A.X teamed up with Wizkid to release his first single under the imprint titled "Caro" which gained massive airplay and further ushered him into the Nigerian music industry. "Caro" gained massive airplay and was critically accepted among music critics. The song was nominated in the "Hottest Single of The Year" category at the 2014 Nigeria Entertainment Awards.

Following the success of "Caro", L.A.X featured Wizkid on another song titled "Ginger". The song was nominated in the "Best Collaboration" category at the 2014 edition of BEN Television Awards. In August 2014, he completed his master's degree programme from the University of Manchester. In an interview with Encomium Magazine, L.A.X revealed that he is working on his debut studio album.

On 4 March 2018, L.A.X established his record label Rasaki Music Group (commonly known as Rasaki Music Ltd or Rasaki Music), with its headquarters in Lagos. On 27 July 2020, he announced signing with Empire Distribution, Records and Publishing Inc., with the release of his song "Lose My Mind", the opening track on his second studio album ZaZa Vibes, which was released on 25 November 2020, through Rasaki Music, and Empire. The album features Mr Eazi, Tekno, Tiwa Savage, Simi, Peruzzi, TimiBOI, and OmarTheDJ. On 24 November 2021, he released an extended version of the album, with new features from Zaider, Lil Silvio, and Bella Shmurda. In 2021, L.A.X covers Deeds Magazine print titled "L.A.X: Syncing Good Vibes and Exceptional Music", following the success of the album.

== Discography ==
Year	Song	Album
2012	"Jaye" (featuring Ice Prince)	Non-album singles
2012	"Looking For Me" (featuring Shyce, T.I.J & Bolly)	Non-album singles
2013	"Y.G.I"	Non-album singles
2013	"Caro" (featuring Wizkid)	Non-album singles
2014	"Ginger" (featuring Wizkid)	Non-album singles
2015	"Morenike"	Non-album singles
2015	"Fine Boy" (featuring Olamide)	Non-album singles
2015	"Open and Close"	Non-album singles
2016	"Ole" (featuring Dremo & YCEE)	Non-album singles
2016	"Gimme Dat"	Non-album singles
2016	"Awon Da"	Non-album singles
2017	"Big Daddy"	"Runaway"
2021	"Sempe"	ZaZa Vibes

	As featured artist	
2016	"Give You Love" (Juls Featuring L.A.X)	Non-Album Single
2017	"Stay With Me" ( Lekaa Beats Featuring L.A.X)	Non-Album Single

== Videography ==
List of music videos, with directors, showing year released
Title	Year	Director(s)
"Jaye" (featuring Ice Prince)	2012	Moe Musa
"Y.G.I"	2013	—N/a
"Caro" (featuring Wizkid)	2013	Moe Musa
"Ginger" (featuring Wizkid)	2013	—N/a
"Morenikeji"	2015	Clarence Peters
"Fine Boy" (featuring Olamide)	2015	Unlimited L.A
"Open and Close"	2015	Alexx Adjei
"Ole" (featuring Dremo & YCEE)	2016	Director Q
"Big Daddy"	2017	Mikes Pro
"Run Away"	2017	Labi
"Sempe"	2021	?

== Awards and nominations ==
Year	Award ceremony	Prize	Recipient/Nominated work	Result	Ref
2014	2014 Nigeria Entertainment Awards	Hottest Single of The Year	"Caro"	Nominated	
2014	2014 Nigeria Entertainment Awards	Diaspora Artist of the Year	Himself	Won	
2014	2014 BEN Television Awards	Best Collaboration	"Ginger"	Nominated	
