= Attention to Detail (album) =

2017 album by Kcee

Studio album by Kcee
- Released: 24 August 2017
- Length: 69:00
- Label: Five Star Music
- Producer: Mystro; Blaq Jerzee; Dr Amir; Krizbeatz

Kcee chronology
Take Over (2013)	Attention to Detail (2017)	Eastern Conference (2019)

Singles from Attention to Detail
- 1. "Tender" Released: 12 October 2016; 2. "Romantic Call" Released: 9 March 2017; 3. "Desire" Released: 18 April 2017; 4. "We Go Party" Released: 22 June 2017; 5. "Vanessa" Released: 9 August 2017; 6. "Dance" Released: 13 September 2017; 7. "Wine for Me" Released: 26 October 2017

Attention to Detail is the second solo studio album by Nigerian singer Kcee. It was released on 24 August 2017 by Five Star Music and features guest appearances from Falz, 2Baba, Tekno, Flavour, Olamide, Patoranking, Phyno, Shatta Wale, and Sauti Sol. Its production was mainly handled by Mystro, along with additional production from Blaq Jerzee, Dr Amir, and Krizbeatz. The album serves as a follow-up to Kcee's debut, Take Over (2013).

== Background and promotion ==
In the lead-up to Attention to Detail, Kcee revealed his intention to combine his music career with political aspirations. In August 2017, he announced plans to run for the office of the governor of Anambra State ahead of Nigeria's 2019 general elections. The album was positioned as part of this new chapter, with Kcee encouraging young people and his fan base to get involved in national development. "I encourage every youth and all of my fans to join this movement of contributing our quota to the rescue of this great nation," he wrote on Instagram. Kcee revealed the tracklist for Attention to Detail three days before the album's release.

== Singles ==
The album's lead single, "Tender", featuring Tekno, was released on 12 October 2016. It is one of the album's bonus tracks. The music video for "Tender" was released on 23 November 2016 and directed by Patrick Elis. Another one of the album's bonus tracks, "Romantic Call", was released on 9 March 2017 as the album's second single. The accompanying music video was directed by Director Ace and Zacky Madar. "Desire", another bonus track off the album was released as Attention to Detail's third single on 18 April 2017. The Mystro-produced "We Go Party" featuring Olamide was released as the album's fourth single. The Owanbe-themed music video for "We Go Party" was directed by Unlimited L.A and featured cameos from the likes of DJ Jimmy Jatt and Iyabo Ojo. The album's fifth single "Vanessa" was released on 9 August 2017, alongside its music video. "Vanessa" was produced by Mystro. The sixth single "Dance" featuring Phyno was released on 13 September 2017; its music video was directed by Clarence Peters. The seventh and final single "Whine for Me" features Kenyan afropop band Sauti Sol and was released on 26 October 2017, alongside its music video.

== Critical reception ==
Joey Akan of Pulse Nigeria rated Attention to Detail a 3.5/5, describing it as an ambitious but largely one-dimensional pop project driven by Kcee's usual flair for mass appeal and grandiosity. While the album showed moments of experimentation, it mostly stuck to contemporary highlife and feel-good anthems, with Akan concluding, “To his credit, Kcee shows ambition and experimentation on “Attention To Detail," but it is his insistence on contemporary highlife that dominates this project.” Wilfred Okiche of 360nobs described Attention to Detail as a predictable but occasionally enjoyable project that played to Kcee's strengths: catchy, disposable pop songs with danceable highlife influences. Despite a few pleasant moments, Okiche concluded, “Some more attention to detail and Kcee could have had a contained record. This one doesn’t live up to the title.”

== Track listing ==
Attention to Detail track listing
No.	Title	Writer(s)	Producer(s)	Length
1.	"Intro Thank God"	Kingsley Okonkwo	Mystro	1:25
2.	"Vanessa"	Okonkwo	Mystro	3:14
3.	"High Me" (featuring 2Baba)	Okonkwo; Innocent Idibia	Mystro	2:55
4.	"Dem Go Hear Word" (featuring Tekno)	Okonkwo; Augustine Kelechi	Mystro	2:56
5.	"4-40"	Okonkwo	Blaq Jerzee	3:08
6.	"Dance" (featuring Phyno)	Okonkwo; Chibuzor Azubuike	Mystro	3:13
7.	"Whine for Me" (featuring Sauti Sol)	Okonkwo; Bien-Aimé Baraza; Willis Chimano; Savara Mudigi; Polycarp Otieno	Krizbeatz	4:02
8.	"Kwarangida"	Okonkwo	Dr Amir	3:07
9.	"Sugar"	Okonkwo	Blaq Jerzee	3:52
10.	"Oje"	Okonkwo	Mystro	3:00
11.	"Gaze" (featuring Patoranking)	Okonkwo; Patrick Okorie	Dr Amir	3:21
12.	"My Boo" (featuring Falz)	Okonkwo; Folarin Falana	Krizbeatz	3:24
13.	"Ji Gi Dem"	Okonkwo	Blaq Jerzee	3:08
14.	"We Go Party" (featuring Olamide)	Okonkwo; Olamide Adedeji	Mystro	3:13
15.	"Oluebebe"	Okonkwo	Krizbeatz	2:42
16.	"Oh My God" (featuring Flavour)	Okonkwo; Chinedu Okoli	Mystro	3:00
17.	"Obiageli" (featuring Phyno)	Okonkwo; Azubuike	Mystro	3:00
18.	"Bounce" (featuring Shatta Wale)	Okonkwo; Charles Mensah Jr.	Mystro	3:24
19.	"Afro Shake"	Okonkwo	Dr Amir	3:09

Bonus tracks
No.	Title	Writer(s)	Producer(s)	Length
20.	"Desire"	Okonkwo	Mystro	3:01
21.	"Romantic Call"	Okonkwo	Dr Amir	3:25
22.	"Tender" (featuring Tekno)	Okonkwo; Kelechi	Mystro	3:36
Total length:				71:10

== Release history ==
Release history and formats for Attention to Detail
Region	Date	Format	Label
Various	24 August 2017	CD; digital download	Five Star Music
