= Aye (Davido song) =

Single by Davido
- Released: February 1, 2014
- Recorded: 2014
- Genre: Afropop
- Length: 3:55
- Label: HKN Music
- Songwriter: David Adeleke
- Producer: TSpize

Davido singles chronology
"Gallardo" (2013)	"Aye" (2014)	"Elele" (2014)

Music video
- "Aye" on YouTube

"Aye" (pronounced ah yay) is a song by Nigerian singer Davido. It was produced by TSpize, a record producer affiliated with Runtown. The song peaked at number five on MTV Base's Official Naija Top 10 chart for the week of March 28 through April 3, 2014, and was primarily released to celebrate Valentine's Day. "Aye" won several accolades, including Hottest Single of the Year at the 2014 Nigeria Entertainment Awards and Song of the Year at The Headies 2014.

== Composition ==
It was alleged that Davido bought "Aye" from Runtown, an artist who featured him on "Gallardo".

== Critical reception ==
"Aye" received positive reviews from music critics. Micheal Abimboye of Premium Times newspaper said the song's instrumental is "reminiscent of beats made popular by kegite clubs" and that its "cool tempo reminds one of an old school video of a generation past slow-grooving to high-life in a jazz club." An editor for the website Fuse.com.ng characterized the melody of "Aye" as "charismatic" and said it "provides a sing along vibe that catches the lips of both old and young as they hold on to their head gear or do the Bata dance while singing happily".

David Drake of Pitchfork said "Aye" is "perhaps the sweetest song of devotion yet written" and further stated that the song's "piercing guitar lines cut through to provide a melodic counterpoint."

== Music video ==
The music video for "Aye" was filmed in Nigeria by Clarence Peters. It was uploaded to YouTube on February 7, 2014, at a total length of 4 minutes and 11 seconds. In the video, Davido plays a poor farmer who is physically attracted to a princess. Davido took the unconventional route by shooting the video in a rural setting. The area where the video was shot complements the song's lyrics. According to YouTube's first quarter report, the music video was the most watched video by Nigerians on the video sharing site.

== Accolades ==
Year	Awards ceremony	Award description(s)	Results	Ref
2014	The Headies	Best Pop Single	Nominated	
2014	The Headies	Song of the Year	Won	
2014	Channel O Music Video Awards	Most Gifted Male	Nominated	
2014	Channel O Music Video Awards	Most Gifted Afro Pop	Nominated	
2014	Channel O Music Video Awards	Most Gifted West	Nominated	
2014	Channel O Music Video Awards	Most Gifted Video of the Year	Nominated	
2014	Nigeria Entertainment Awards	Hottest Single of the Year	Won	
2014	City People Entertainment Awards	Most Popular Song of the Year	Nominated	
2015	COSON Song Awards	The Song of Songs	Won	
2015	COSON Song Awards	Best Song in Melody	Nominated	
2015	COSON Song Awards	Best Love Song	Nominated	

== Year-end lists ==
Year	Publication	Rank	Country	List
2014	Google	1	Nigeria	YouTube's 2014 Most-Watched Music Videos in Nigeria
2014	YNaija	4	Nigeria	The 10 Best Songs of 2014
2014	The Fader	81	United States	The FADER's 116 Best Tracks Of 2014
