= The Headies Award for Best Pop Single =

Nigerian music industry award

- Awarded for: Best Pop Single for the given year
- Country: Nigeria
- Presented by: Hip Hop World Magazine
- First award: 2011
- Website: theheadies.com

The Headies Award for Best Pop Single is an award presented at The Headies, a ceremony that was established in 2006 and originally called the Hip Hop World Awards. It was first presented to Dr SID's single Pop Something in 2011.

== Recipients ==
Best Pop Single
| Year | Nominees | Result |
|---|---|---|
| 2019 | Ye – Burna Boy | Nominated |
| 2019 | Wetin We Gain – Victor AD | Nominated |
| 2019 | Fake Love – Starboy (featuring Duncan Mighty and Wizkid) | Nominated |
| 2019 | Case – Teni | Won |
| 2019 | Jealous – Fireboy DML | Nominated |
| 2019 | Baby – Joeboy | Nominated |
| 2018 | Mad Over You – Runtown | Nominated |
| 2018 | All Over – Tiwa Savage | Nominated |
| 2018 | Yeba – Kiss Daniel | Nominated |
| 2018 | Iskaba – Wande Coal & DJ Tunez | Nominated |
| 2018 | If – Davido | Won |
| 2018 | Fia – Davido | Nominated |
| 2016 | Mama – Kiss Daniel | Nominated |
| 2016 | Final (Baba Nla) – Wizkid | Nominated |
| 2016 | Pick Up – Adekunle Gold | Nominated |
| 2016 | Osinachi – Humblesmith (featuring Davido) | Nominated |
| 2016 | Reggae Blues – Harrysong (featuring Orezi, Iyanya, Olamide, Kcee) | Won |
| 2016 | Emergency – D’banj | Nominated |
| 2016 | Fada Fada – Phyno (featuring Olamide) | Nominated |
| 2016 | Money – Timaya (featuring Flavour) | Nominated |
| 2015 | Godwin – Korede Bello | Won |
| 2015 | Ojuelegba – Wizkid | Nominated |
| 2015 | Collabo – P-Square (featuring Don Jazzy) | Nominated |
| 2015 | My Woman, My Everything – Patoranking (featuring Wande Coal) | Nominated |
| 2015 | Woju – Kiss Daniel | Nominated |
| 2015 | Bobo – Olamide | Nominated |
| 2014 | Dorobucci – Mavin Crew | Won |
| 2014 | Aye – Davido | Nominated |
| 2014 | Johnny – Yemi Alade | Nominated |
| 2014 | Pull Over – Kcee (featuring Wizkid) | Nominated |
| 2014 | Double Wahala – Oritse Femi | Nominated |
| 2014 | Caro – Starboy (featuring Wizkid and L.A.X) | Nominated |
| 2014 | Surulere – Dr. Sid (featuring Don Jazzy) | Nominated |
| 2013 | Ihe Neme – 2Face Idibia | Won |
| 2013 | The Kick - Wande Coal (featuring Don Jazzy) | Nominated |
| 2013 | Gobe - Davido | Nominated |
| 2013 | Catching Cold - Tunde Ednut | Nominated |
| 2013 | Ur Waist – Iyanya | Nominated |
| 2013 | Goody Bag – D’Prince | Nominated |
| 2012 | Dami Duro – Davido | Nominated |
| 2012 | Oliver Twist – D’Banj | Nominated |
| 2012 | Gaga Crazy – Chuddy K | Nominated |
| 2012 | Chop My Money – P-Square (featuring Akon and May D) | Nominated |
| 2012 | Kukere – Iyanya | Won |
| 2011 | Give It To Me – D’Prince (featuring D'banj) | Nominated |
| 2011 | Pop Champaign – Dr. Sid (featuring D'banj) | Won |
| 2011 | Holla at Your Boy – Wizkid | Nominated |
| 2011 | Mr Endowed – D’banj | Nominated |
| 2011 | Fimile – Kas | Nominated |
