= Runtown =

Nigerian musical artist (born 1989)

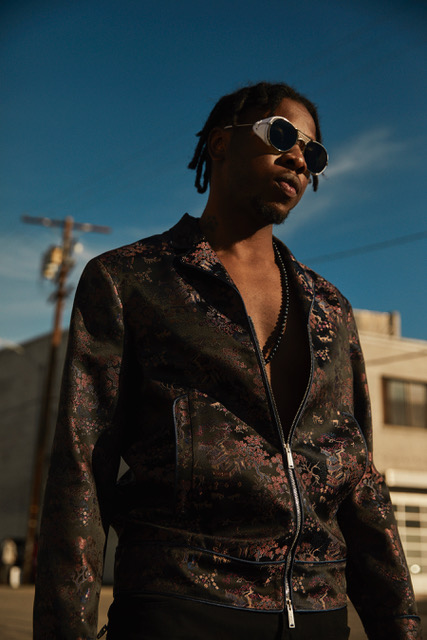
- Runtown in 2018

Background information
- Born: Douglas Jack Agu; 19 August 1989 (age 36)
- Origin: Enugu State, Nigeria
- Genres: R&B, Afro-fusion, hip hop, reggae
- Occupations: Singer, songwriter, producer
- Instrument: Vocal
- Years active: 2010–present
- Label: Soundgod Music Group

Douglas Jack Agu (born 19 August 1989), known by his stage name Runtown, is a Nigerian singer, songwriter, and producer. His music blends Afrobeats, hip-hop, R&B, and reggae. He first gained recognition after releasing the 2014 single "Gallardo", which features vocals by Davido. His 2016 single "Mad Over You" peaked at number 38 on the Billboard Twitter Top Tracks chart.

== Early life ==
Runtown was born on 19 August 1989 in Enugu the capital city of Enugu State in the southeastern region of Nigeria but grew up partly in Abuja the federal capital territory of Nigeria and in Lagos State in southwestern Nigeria, where he finished his primary education. After his father's death, he moved to Abuja with his mother, who was working in the Ministry of Health.

== Music career ==
=== 2010–2014: Early Beginnings and Breakthrough ===
Runtown began his music career in 2007 when he and longtime collaborator Phyno moved to Lagos to pursue music. The pair stayed with J. Martins and worked on his second studio album, with Runtown both collaborating and producing several songs. Through J. Martins, he met Timaya, who later mentored him and influenced his development as an artist. During this time, Runtown continued to develop his skills and learn about the music industry while living with Timaya.

In 2011, Runtown officially launched his career by releasing his debut single, "Party Like It's 1980". In 2014, Runtown released "Gallardo", featuring vocals from Davido. The track served as the lead single from his debut studio album, Ghetto University. "Gallardo" achieved commercial success and won the Best Collaboration of the Year award at the 2014 edition of the Nigeria Entertainment Awards.

In the same year, media reports suggested that Runtown was involved in writing the song "Aye" for Davido. Addressing these rumors in an interview with the Nigerian Tribune, Runtown stated, "A lot of people have been asking me that question. Davido has had several interviews where he addressed how the song came about. So if you want to learn more about 'Aye,' ask Davido or read his interviews."

=== 2015–2017: Ghetto University and international success ===
On 23 November 2015, Runtown released his debut studio album titled Ghetto University via MTN Music Plus through Eric Many Entertainment. The album generated over ₦35million on the music portal thus earning him a spot in the list of "Top 5 Most Streamed Artist".

On 4 November 2016, Runtown released the ballad "Mad Over You", which charted at number 38 on the Billboard Twitter Top Tracks chart. Joey Akan from Pulse Nigeria described the song as a "self-produced track that draws inspiration from the Ghanaian Alkayida sound". Runtown told The Fader magazine that the song was inspired by African beauty.

=== 2018–2022: Independent music ventures and Soundgod Music Group ===
In 2018, Runtown established his record label, Soundgod Music Group, after leaving Eric Many Entertainment due to contractual disputes. Under his label, Runtown continued to release songs, including singles like "Unleash," featuring Fekky, and "For Life."

In 2019, Runtown released the EP Tradition, which received critical acclaim for its production quality and Runtown's lyrical prowess. The project included tracks like "Emotions" and "Goosebumps".

On 16 December 2022, Runtown released the Signs album, which Deborah Jayeoba from African Folder described as a "sign for Runtown to have a grip on his career because this recent taste of him doesn’t please the music palate".

== Discography ==
Studio albums

- Ghetto University (2015)
- Signs (2022)

EPs

- Tradition (2020)
- Soundgod Fest IV (2025)

== Awards and nominations ==
Year	Award ceremony	Prize	Result
2014	2014 Nigeria Entertainment Awards	Best Collaboration of the Year	Nominated
2014	The Headies 2014	Next Rated	Nominated
2015	2015 Nigeria Entertainment Awards	Best Pop Artiste	Nominated
2015	City People Entertainment Awards	Artiste of the Year	Nominated
2017	Vodafone Ghana Music Awards	African Artiste of the Year	Won
2017	Soundcity MVP Awards Festival	Best Collaboration of the Year	Won
2017	Soundcity MVP Awards Festival	Viewer's Choice	Won
2017	Soundcity MVP Awards Festival	Listener's Choice	Nominated
2018	The Headies	Best Pop Single ("Mad Over You")	Nominated

== See also ==
- List of Nigerian musicians
