= Skales =

Nigerian rapper (born 1991)

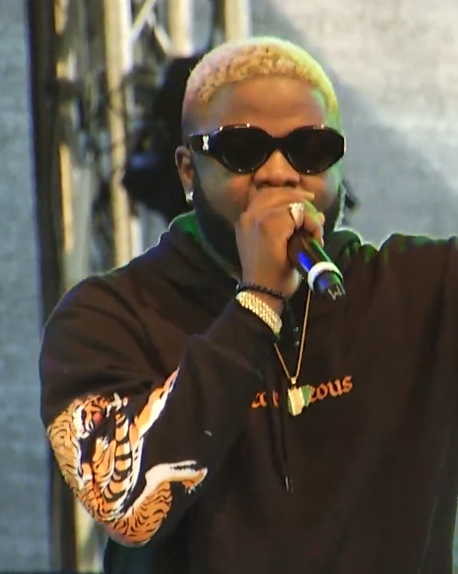
- Skales performing "Shaku Shaku" at the 24th edition of the Koroga Festival in December 2018

Background information
- Born: Raoul John Njeng-Njeng; 1 April 1991 (age 35); Kaduna State, Nigeria
- Genres: Hip-hop; R&B
- Occupations: Rapper; singer; songwriter
- Instrument: Vocals
- Years active: 2000–present
- Labels: Baseline; OHK Music

Raoul John Njeng-Njeng (born 1 April 1991), better known as Skales (an acronym for "Seek Knowledge Acquire Large Entrepreneurial Skills"), is a Nigerian rapper, singer and songwriter. In 2000, he started writing rap songs in Kaduna. Between 2007 and 2008, he travelled to Jos to work with Jesse Jagz and Jeremiah Gyang. In 2008, Skales entered the Zain Tru Search competition and won the competition's North Central region. His debut single, "Must Shine", received numerous spin on the Rhythm FM stations in Lagos, Jos and Abuja.

Skales relocated to Lagos and signed a record deal with Empire Mates Entertainment (E.M.E) in 2009. His well-known songs include "Shake Body", "Mukulu", "Keresimesi", "Komole", "My Baby", "Take Care of Me" and "Denge Pose". He set up his independent record label, OHK Music, after leaving E.M.E in May 2014. His debut studio album, Man of the Year, was released in 2015.

== Early life and career ==
A native of Edo State, Raoul John Njeng-Njeng was born and raised in Kaduna State. He grew up in a single-parent household with his mother, who did menial jobs to nurture him. Skales became interested in music while regularly attending his mother's cassette store. He met producers Jeremiah Gyang and Jesse Jagz while attending the University of Jos (Unijos). He took part in the Zain Tru Search Competition during his time at Unijos and won the competition's North Central region. Skales left Unijos his junior year and attended Lead City University, where he graduated with a degree in office management and technology. His debut single, "Must Shine", received positive critical acclaim. In an interview with This Day newspaper in 2013, Skales described himself as an entertainer whose music is influenced by his surroundings. The song "Jesus Walks" by Kanye West served as the inspiration for his 2009 track "Heading for a Grammy". An anthem to self-empowerment, the song was shaped in part by the events he was going through at the time.

=== 2009–present: E.M.E, OHK Music establishment, and music releases ===
Skales signed a record deal with E.M.E after meeting Banky W. in 2009. He released the singles "Mukulu" and "Keresimesi" simultaneously; both songs were produced by Sarz and released under the outfit. The music video for the latter track was directed by Clarence Peters and uploaded to YouTube on 28 November 2011. Skales was one of the main acts on E.M.E's debut compilation album, Empire Mates State of Mind (2012). He collaborated with Banky W., Wizkid, Shaydee, Niyola and DJ Xclusive on five of the album's seven singles. He also toured with some of the aforementioned acts on the EME US Tour, which kicked off on 4 July and ended on 2 September 2012. E.M.E acts performed in several cities, including Houston, Dallas, Toronto, Vancouver, New York City, Providence, Calgary, Atlanta, Washington, D.C., and Chicago. Skales supported Wizkid on his tour of London in 2012. On 17 October 2013, he performed at the 2013 edition of Felabration, a yearly concert dedicated to Fela Kuti. In February 2014, Vanguard newspaper reported that Skales left E.M.E following the expiration of his four-year recording contract. E.M.E executives believed they were not getting remunerated for investing in him and refused to renew his contract.

Skales founded OHK Music, his own record label, in May 2014. The label has connections to various musicians in Nigeria and is home to producer Drey Beatz. Skales released the Jay Pizzle-produced track "Shake Body" on May 6, 2014, as the lead single from his debut studio album Man of the Year. The accompanying music video for the song was uploaded to YouTube on 22 July 2014. Skales promoted the song by announcing the Shake Body video competition. Skales reportedly signed a record deal with Timaya's Dem Mama Records following his departure from E.M.E. In February 2014, he debunked the reports and said he didn't sign with Dem Mama Records.

In April 2025, Skales reached a career milestone, surpassing one million monthly listeners on Spotify. In April 2025, the number rose to two million monthly listeners on the platform. That same month, Skales performed in Barcelona following FC Barcelona's Copa del Rey final win over Real Madrid.

== Personal life ==
In December 2011, Skales was involved in a car accident along the Lekki-Epe Expressway. The car he was in ran into a ditch and somersaulted. The accident left one dead and three injured. On March 14, 2021, Skales announced his engagement to his girlfriend on Instagram.

== Discography ==
Studio albums

- Man of the Year (2015)
- The Never Say Never Guy (2017)
- Mr Love (2018)
- Sweet Distractions (2022)
- Martina's Son (2025)

EPs

- Healing Process (2020)
- Proof of Life (2023)

Compilation albums

- Empire Mates State of Mind (2012)

Collaborative albums

- Volumes (with Jay Pizzle) (2024)

Selected singles

As lead artist
| Year | Title | Album |
| 2009 | "Must Shine" | Non-album single |
| 2009 | "Bo Se Se Mi" | Non-album single |
| 2009 | "Goosebumps" | Non-album single |
| 2010 | "Ori Mi" (featuring Wizkid) | Non-album single |
| 2010 | "Be Mine" | Non-album single |
| 2010 | "Thank God It's Christmas" | Non-album single |
| 2014 | "Must Shine" | Non-album single |
| 2014 | "Shake Body" | Man of the Year |
| 2015 | "Je Kan Mo" | Man of the Year |
| 2015 | "Always" (featuring Davido) | Man of the Year |
| 2015 | "I Am For Real" | Non-album single |
| 2015 | "Jogodo" (featuring Oritsefemi) | The Never Say Never Guy |
| 2016 | "Ajaga" (featuring Timaya and Davido) | The Never Say Never Guy |
| 2016 | "Nobody's Business" (featuring Banky W.) | Non-album single |
| 2017 | "Agolo" | Non-album single |
| 2017 | "For You" | Non-album single |
| 2018 | "O'Crazy" | Non-album single |
| 2018 | "Fire Waist" (featuring Harmonize) | Mr Love |
| 2019 | "Feposi" | Non-album single |
| 2020 | "Oliver Twist II" (Remix) (featuring Falz and Harmonize) | Non-album single |
| 2021 | "This Your Body" (featuring Davido) | Non-album single |
| 2025 | "D.L.L.Y" | |
As featured artist
| 2010 | "God's Love" | The Return of Jeremiah |
| 2010 | "Meet Me at the Top" (LayLow featuring Iceberg Slim, CartiAir, Modenine, Terry Tha Rapman, Skales, Vector, Da Grin, Ludu and Gino) | Non-album single |
| 2010 | "Move Your Body" (DJ KaySmith featuring Skales) | Naija Hottest Singles Vol 1 Mixtape |
| 2010 | "Laba Laba" (Samklef featuring Skales) | Non-album single |
| 2010 | "Blackberry" (Leo Wonder featuring Skales) | Non-album single |
| 2010 | "Mary Jane" (Christine Ben-Ameh featuring Skales) | Non-album single |
| 2011 | "Fall Back" (Beazy featuring Pope, Loose Kaynon and Skales) | Non-album single |
| 2011 | "Eguono" (Remix) (Kefee featuring Skales) | Non-album single |
| 2011 | "Superstar" (Remix) (Contradiction featuring Skales) | Non-album single |
| 2011 | "My Money" (Remix) (Sheyman featuring eLDee and Skales) | Non-album single |
| 2011 | "J'amalo" (El Phlex featuring Sheyman and Skales) | School of Thoughts |
| 2011 | "Oju Kan" (Remix) (Tupengo featuring Skales, Seriki, Reminisce, Phenom, Kel and Patoranking) | Non-album single |
| 2018 | "Pon Mi" (Remix) by Beenie Gunter (featuring Skales, DJ Slickstuart, DJ Roja) | Non-album single |
| 2018 | "Olina Work" by Beenie Gunter (featuring Skales) | Non-album single |
| 2019 | "Bomblast" by Beenie Gunter (featuring Skales) | No Fear |

== See also ==
- List of Nigerian musicians
