= Shugavybz =

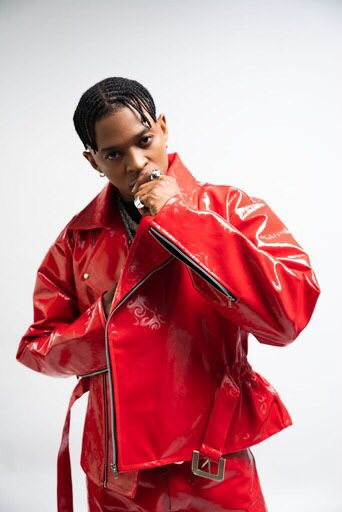

Background information
- Born: Godwin Emmanuel Ifeanyi; Lagos, Nigeria
- Origin: Nigerian
- Genres: Afropop, Amapiano, Afrobeat
- Occupations: composer; singer-songwriter; music producer; instrumentalist
- Years active: 2021–present
- Label: Godboy Empire

Godwin Emmanuel Ifeanyi known professionally as Shugavybz, is a platinum Grammy-nominated Nigerian composer, record producer, songwriter, and singer. Paulash Panache featured them on their 2020 single "No Girlfriend No Problem" with Roger Lino, and Leeroy Afrika, which earned him a nomination at 2020 City People Music Awards for Best Collabo of the Year

He gained international recognition for co-writing Davido's Grammy-nominated fourth studio album Timeless, not to be confused with Goldie's debut album of the same name. He primarily produced and wrote most songs on Iyanya's third EP The 6th Wave. On 15 May 2023, Shugavybz was ranked number thirty-four on TurnTable's Official Producer Top 100.

== Early life and career ==
Godwin Emmanuel Ifeanyi was born in Ojodu Berger, a suburb area of Lagos, and hails from Ebonyi State. He had his primary education at Access Model Private School and his secondary education at SusanChris International Model Secondary School and Ugwuakuma Secondary School Arochukwu, before proceeding to study at Federal Polytechnic, Nekede in Imo State for his tertiary education. In 2024, he shared his early musical experience with TurnTable, saying "My parents and the kind of music my dad listened to when I was younger. I was really close to him, so I heard a lot of rhythmic music being influenced by the best of the 80s and 90s."

He achieved recognition for his work on Iyanya's 2022 single One Side. In 2023, he co-wrote the Grammy-nominated Best Global Music Album Timeless by Davido. His productions include "Yawa No Dey End" by Majeeed, "Sinner" by Iyanya, "Paloma" by Mr. P, "Morning Call" by Harmonize, "Go" by Kcee, "My Baby" by Diamond Platnumz, and "Pounds & Dollars" by Diamond Platnumz and the two-time Grammy Award-winning flautist Wouter Kellerman.

== Artisty ==
Shugavybz cited Fela Kuti, Paulson Kalu, Osita Osadebe, Lawrence Obusi, and the best of the 80s and 90s, as his musical influence.

== Awards and nominations ==
Award	Year	Category	Recipient	Result	Ref
City People Music Awards	2020	Best Collabo of the Year	"No Girlfriend No Problem" (with. Paulash Panache, Roger Lino, and Leeroy Afrika)	Nominated	
Grammy Awards	2024	Best Global Music Album	Timeless by Davido	Nominated	

== Discography ==
=== Albums ===
List of studio albums, with selected details and chart positions
Title	Details	Peak chart positions
Title	Details	NG
Love Potion	Released: 22 January 2021; Formats: Digital download, streaming	

=== Singles ===
List of charted singles, with selected chart positions
Title	Year	Peak chart positions			Certifications	Album
Title	Year	NG	UK	US	Certifications	Album
"Odigi"	2021	—	—	—		Love Potion
"Kele" (with. King Bernard, Roger Lino)	2023	—	—	—		TBA
"Tempa"	2024	—	—	—		TBA
"Ifeoma" (with. BoyPee)	2024	—	—	—		TBA

List of charted singles as a featured artist, with selected chart positions
Artist	Title	Year	Peak chart positions			Certifications	Album
Artist	Title	Year	NG	US	UK	Certifications	Album
Godboy	"BELIEVE (Covid – 19)" (feat. Singah, Shugavybz, DJ Switch, Pryme, Leeroy Afrika & Xbusta)	2020	—	—	—		Non-album single
Paulash Panache	"Lituation" (feat. Shugavybz, RogerLino, and Leeroy Africa)	2020	—	—	—		Non-album single
Paulash Panache	"No Girlfriend No Problem" (feat. Shugavybz, Leeroy Afrika, and Roger Lino)	2021	—	—	—		Non-album single
Godboy	"Dealer Man" (feat. Pryme, Singah, Roger Lino, and Shugavybz)	2022	—	—	—		TBA
Godboy	"Eledumare" (feat. Roger Lino, Pryme, Singah, and Shugavybz)	2022	—	—	—		TBA
Godboy	"Kontinu" (feat. Shugavybz, Roger Lino, and Pryme)	2022	—	—	—		TBA
Godboy	"Lagos City" (feat. Shugavybz & Roger Lino)	2023	—	—	—		TBA

== Production discography ==
=== Singles produced ===
Title	Year	Album	Release date
"Attencion" (Singah)	2021	The Moon and Back	27 August 2021
"Yawa No Dey End" (Majeeed)	2022	Bitter Sweet	25 February 2022
"One Side" (Iyanya)	2022	The 6th Wave	15 September 2022
"Go" (feat. Iyanya) (Kcee)	2022	Non-album single	4 November 2022
"My Baby" (feat. Chike) (Diamond Platnumz)	2023	TBA	3 February 2023
"Sinner" (feat. BNXN) (Iyanya)	2023	TBA	3 May 2023
"All Over You" (Guchi)	2023	All Over You / Mon Bébé	2 June 2023
"Morning Call" (Harmonize)	2023	TBA	16 June 2023

=== Selected albums produced and songwriting credit ===
Artist	Album	Release date	Certifications	Label	Note
Mr. P	The Prodigal	2 April 2021		P Classic Records	Co-producer
Neeza	After School	17 September 2021		Weird Kidd Inc	Co-producer
Singah	The Moon and Back	26 November 2021		P Classic Records	Co-producer
Jaywillz	Sun Flower	11 February 2022		Chaado Music Worldwide	Co-producer
Diamond Platnumz	First Of All	11 March 2022		WCB Wasafi	Co-producer
Majeeed	Bitter Sweet	25 March 2022		Dream Empire Music	Co-producer
Iyanya	The 6th Wave	21 October 2022		Made Men Music Group	Primary producer; Composer
Davido	Timeless	31 March 2023		DMW; Columbia; Sony	Composer
Iyanya	Love & Trust	9 June 2023		Made Men Music Group	Co-producer; Co-writer
Kcee	Mr. Versatile	26 July 2024		Five Star Music	Co-producer
