= Jones Worldwide =

Nigerian music company

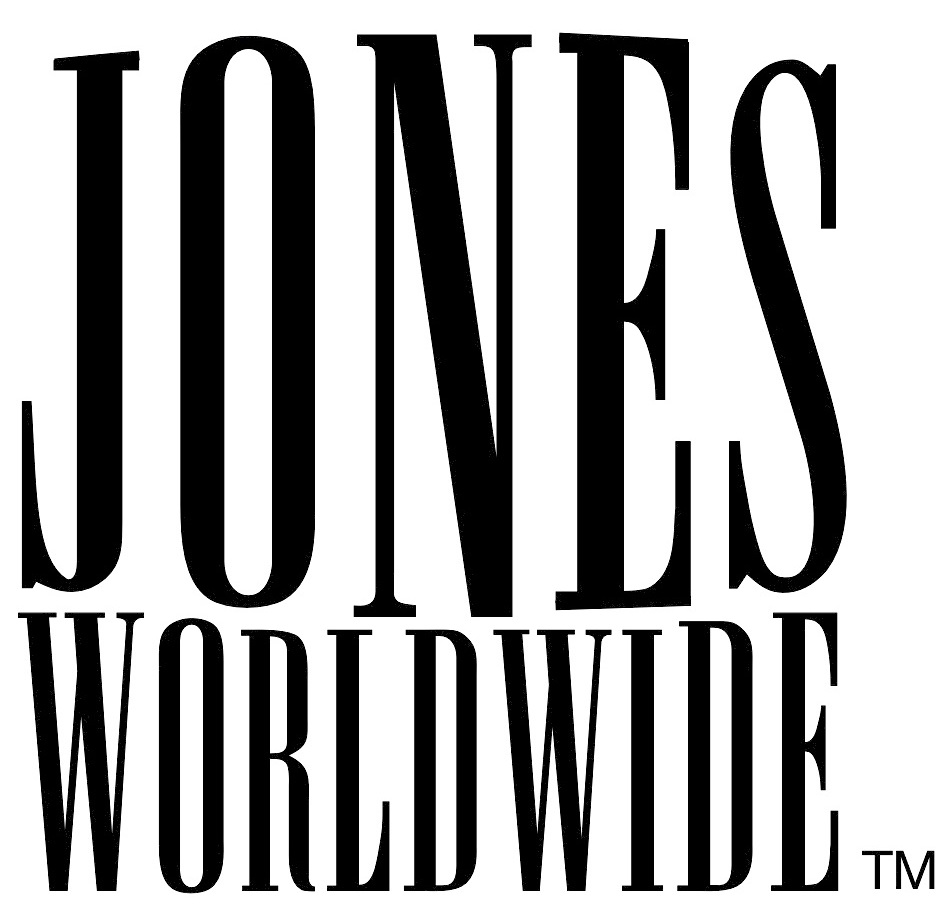
- Formerly: Jones Music
- Type: Private
- Industry: Music
- Genre: Various
- Founded: 2014 (as Jones Music)
- Founder: Shay Jones
- Headquarters: Lagos, Nigeria
- Number of locations: Lagos; Brooklyn; Los Angeles
- Area served: West Africa, United States
- Key people: Shay Jones (CEO.)
- Products: Music; Management
- Services: Artist & Label; Music publishing Music recording Distribution; Branding; Management

Jones Worldwide (JWW) formerly Jones Music, is a Nigerian music and management company, providing Artist & Label services. The company is led by its chief executive officer Shay Jones, the former vice president, and Head of Artists and repertoire at The Aristokrat Group. Jones Worldwide currently houses artists Seyi Shay, Ijekimora, with producers Kel-P, and Bruno Aikore.

== History ==
Jones Music was founded in 2014 by David Olakot (better known as Shay Jones), as a record label. Following the end of a project licensing deal with the music duo Jones Lifestyle in 2016, the label paused all operations. In 2020, following the exit of the vice president of The Aristokrat Group, the company rebranded it name from Jones Music to Jones Worldwide, and began all operations.

On 17 February 2020, the music company signed a strategic deal with Lifestyle image consultant, to help rebrand, visualize, and shape their image development. Same day, JWW signed its first artists Ijekimora, and Bruno Aikore since the transition from Jones Music. On 21 February 2021, King Perry signed a partnership deal with Jones Worldwide, to help conceptualize, and market his project Citizen of The World. Seyi Shay second studio album Big Girl, was executively produced by Jones Worldwide. The album was released on 10 December 2021, after her first debut album Seyi or Shay (2015). Big Girl features Jones CEO; Shay on "Mine".

On 1 September 2022, Jones CEO: Shay Jones and COO: Wisdom Ehijele, was on the cover of the first issue of TurnTable Industry Digest. On the magazine, the directors spoke about their journey, experience in Ghana and South Africa, their time at Aristokrat, being a former artiste and how it helps them as executives; during their conversation with TurnTable editor-in-chief Ayomide Oriowo.

== Roster ==
=== Current acts ===
Act	Year signed	Releases under the label
Bruno Aikore	2020	—
Ijekimora	2020	—
Seyi Shay	2021	1
King Perryy	2021	— (Note: "Citizen of The World" was not released by Jones Worldwide, but was marketed, and distributed by Jones Worldwide)

=== Former artists ===
Act	Year signed	Year left	Releases under the label
Jones Lifestyle	2014	2016	1

=== Management ===
Act	Year signed	Label
Kel-P	2021	Aristokrat Records, Universal Music France
Ria Sean	2021	Aristokrat Records, Universal Music France

== Discography ==
=== Albums/Mixtape/EP ===
`List of Albums, Mixtapes, Lps, and Eps licensed, and distributed through Jones Worldwide
Artist	Album	Details	Labels	Notes
Jones Lifestyle	Jones Lifestyle - The EP	Released: 8 February 2015; Chart Position: —; Certification: —	—	Licensed
King Perryy	Citizen of the World	Released: 28 April 2021; Chart Position: —; Certification: —	DM Records	Distributed
Seyi Shay	Big Girl	Released: 10 December 2021; Chart Position: —; Certification: —	Stargurl Limited; Jones Worldwide	Executive produced; A&R; Licensed
Kel-P	Bully Season Vol.1	Released: 24 February 2023; Chart Position: —; Certification: —	Jones Worldwide; Virgin Music France; Universal Music France	Distributed; Executive produced
Kel-P	Bully Season Vol.2 : Pretty Girls Love Afrobeats	Released: 28 June 2024; Chart Position: —; Certification: —	Jones Worldwide; Virgin Music France; Universal Music France	Distributed; Executive produced
Kel-P & Wande Coal	Best of Both Worlds	Released: 28 February 2025; Chart Position: —; Certification: —	Jones Worldwide	Distributed; Executive produced
