= Legend or No Legend =

Studio album by Wande Coal
- Released: 18 May 2023
- Recorded: 2021–2023
- Genre: Afrobeats; amapiano; R&B; hip hop
- Length: 40:00
- Label: Starstruck; Black Diamond; Empire
- Producer: Dunnie; Bruno; Screwface; P.Priime; Kel-P; K-Dream

Wande Coal chronology
Realms (2020)	Legend or No Legend (2023)	Best of Both Worlds (2025)

Singles from Legend or No Legend
- 1. "Come My Way" Released: 27 October 2021; 2. "Kpe Paso" Released: 2 February 2023; 3. "Let Them Know" Released: 21 April 2023; 4. "Ebelebe" Released: 19 October 2023

Legend or No Legend is the third studio album by Nigerian singer and songwriter Wande Coal. It was released on 18 May 2023 through Starstruck Management, Empire Distribution, and Black Diamond Entertainment. The album features guest appearances from Wizkid, Olamide, T-Pain and Fireboy DML. Wande Coal featured producers such as Kel-P, Screwface, Dunnie, Bruno, K-Dream and P.Priime. The album is a follow-up to his 2020 EP, Realms (2020).

== Background ==
The album was originally going to be released on 31 March 2023, when it was postponed to 7 April. Some observers speculated that the delay followed the announcement of fellow Nigerian singer Davido's album Timeless for the same day. Legend or No Legend got pushed back a second time and then went to be revealed that the release date had been 18 May 2023. In an interview with OkayAfrica, Wande Coal said the reason for the name of the album.

It's always good for people to doubt, and it's always good for them to see results. Whatever people say pushes me. Positive or negative, I pour it into the music. I know it's time for me to show my growth over the years. I want people to soak it in and understand that I'm living my dreams as an African artist,

Wande Coal shared.

== Singles ==
The album's lead single "Come My Way" was released on 28 October 2021 and produced by Bruno and Screwface. The music video for "Come My Way" was released on 5 November 2021 and was shot and directed in Lagos by Sesan.

The second single "Kpe Paso" features Olamide and was produced by Kel-P. The song won Best Vocal Performance (Male) at the 2023 edition of the Headies and was nominated for Best Collaboration. The music video for "Kpe Paso" was directed by Jyde Ajala.

The third single "Let Them Know" was released on 21 April 2023 with an accompanying music video. "Let Them Know" was produced by Kel-P and the music video was directed by TG Omori.

The fourth single "Ebelebe" features Wizkid and was released on 19 October 2023. The music video for "Ebelebe" was directed by Director K.

== Critical reception ==
Esther Kalu of Premium Times wrote that the album revisited familiar sounds with strong features but stayed safe, as Wande Coal "sat too much in a comfort zone to leave listeners craving something better." She concluded that while his past work confirmed his legacy, "this album fails to capture his real genius," and she rated it 4 out of 10. Emmanuel Esomnofu, reviewed for The Native Magazine, wrote that the album arrived with heavy expectations but leaned on familiar ideas, as many songs were "approached from a place of comfort rather than pushing himself." He concluded that while Wande Coal's influence still made him a legend, "this album doesn’t summarily capture his genius," leaving little reason for repeat listens. Emmanuel Daraloye, writing for Afrocritik, provided a more nuanced crtiique, noting that the album responded to debates about Wande Coal's legacy and showed his versatility and it "put things in proper perspective." He concluded that even if it did not reach the levels of his debut, "he’s a legend, and on this album, he does what legends do" and he rated it 6.9/10.

=== Accolades ===
Year	Awards ceremony	Award description(s)	Results
2023	African Entertainment Awards USA	Album of the Year	Nominated

== Track listing ==
Legend or No Legend track listing
No.	Title	Writer(s)	Producer(s)	Length
1.	"Nobody Holy"	Wande Ojosipe; Dunni Lawal; Joseph Charles; Cesar Biahute; Towa Ojosipe	Dunnie	3:15
2.	"Come My Way"	W. Ojosipe; Aikore Abulimen; Charles; T. Ojosipe	Bruno; Screwface	3:30
3.	"3 Square Meal"	W. Ojosipe; David Adeboye; Charles	K-Dream	3:04
4.	"Dues"	W. Ojosipe; Lawal; Adenle Adedoyin; Charles; T. Ojosipe	Dunnie	2:52
5.	"E Choke"	W. Ojosipe; Kelvin Peter; Charles; T. Ojosipe	Kel-P	2:54
6.	"Let Them Know"	W. Ojosipe; Peter; Charles; T. Ojosipe	Kel-P	3:24
7.	"Streets" (featuring T-Pain)	W. Ojosipe; Faheem Najm; T. Ojosipe	Kel-P	2:47
8.	"Kpe Paso" (featuring Olamide)	W. Ojosipe; Olamide Adedeji; Prince Okafor; Peter; T. Ojosipe	Kel-P	2:57
9.	"Ebelebe" (featuring Wizkid)	W. Ojosipe; Ayodeji Balogun; Michael Adeyinka; Peace Aderogba; T. Ojosipe	P.Priime	3:29
10.	"Genesis"	W. Ojosipe; Charles; Peter; T. Ojosipe	Kel-P	2:26
11.	"Jabo" (featuring Fireboy DML)	W. Ojosipe; Adedamola Adefolahan; T. Ojosipe; Adeboye	K-Dream	3:11
12.	"Sho Ma Gba"	W. Ojosipe; Peter; Charles; Adedeji	Kel-P	2:41
13.	"Don't Feel Love"	W. Ojosipe; Peter; Charles	Kel-P	3:31
Total length:				40:00

== Personnel ==
- Oluwatobi "Wande Coal" Ojosipe – vocals
- Ayodeji "Wizkid" Balogun – vocals
- Adedamola "Fireboy DML" Adefolahan – vocals
- Faheem "T-Pain" Najm – vocals
- Olamide Adedeji – vocals
- Bruno – producer
- K-Dream – producer
- Joseph "Screwface" Charles – producer
- Dunni "Dunnie" Lawal – producer
- Prince "P.Priime" Aderogba – producer
- Udoma "Kel-P" Amba – producer, engineer
- Trehy Harris – mixing engineer
- Chris Athens – mastering engineer
- Sesan Ogunro – video director
- Jyde Ajala – video director
- TG Omori – video director

== Release history ==
Release history for Legend or No Legend
Region	Date	Format	Label
Nigeria	18 May 2023	Digital download; streaming	Empire
