= The Prodigal (Mr. P album) =

Studio album by Mr. P
- Released: 2 April 2021
- Genre: Afrobeats; Afro pop; R&B; dancehall
- Length: 61:00
- Label: P-Classic
- Producer: Mr. P; Goldswarm; Shugavybz; Sarmy Fire; DaiHard Beatz; Kealzbeats

Singles from The Prodigal
- 1. "Follow My Lead" Released: 11 December 2020

The Prodigal is the debut solo album by Nigerian singer Mr. P. It was released on 2 April 2021 by his independent record label P-Classic Records. The album runs for 61 minutes and spans sixteen tracks, featuring guest appearances from Tamar Braxton, Tiwa Savage, Mohombi, Wande Coal, Simi, Teni, Singah, DJ Switch, and Ovie Kelz. Its production was handled by Goldswarm, Shugavybz, Sarmy Fire, DaiHard Beatz, Kealzbeats, and Mr. P himself.

== Background ==
Following the split of Nigerian duo P-Square, the twins pursued separate careers, with Paul adopting Rudeboy as his stage name and Peter performing as Mr. P. Mr. P began releasing solo singles in 2017, including songs such as "Cool It Down" and "Zombie". In the years that followed, he continued releasing music while working on his debut studio album. In 2021, he announced his first studio album, The Prodigal, as his debut studio album as a solo artist.

=== Singles ===
"Follow My Lead" featuring Wande Coal was released as the album's lead single on 11 December 2020. When announcing the single, Mr. P said “Through my journey in life and as an artist, every battle I've won; big and small has been because I followed my instincts. When you know exactly who you are and what you're capable of, you learn to trust yourself. And that has made it easy for me to follow my lead."

== Reception ==
The album was rated 6.0/10 by Motolani Alake of Pulse Nigeria.

Olalekan Okeremilekun of tooXclusive says "Mr. P has a lot to be thankful for because unlike what a lot of critics expected, Mr. P did a fine job. The 60-minute album is packed with good songs and collaborations." He also added that "the production is quite impressive, as well as the chemistry between the featured artiste and Mr. P."

Afrobeatsvibe rated the album 3.5/5 adding that "If anyone doubted Peter Okoye’s ability as a solo artist, this album surely puts all those arguments to rest."

== Track listing ==
The Prodigal track listing
No.	Title	Writer(s)	Producer(s)	Length
1.	"Odo"	Peter Okoye	Mr. P	4:12
2.	"Paloma" (featuring Singah)	Okoye; Fabian Okike	Sarmy Fire	3:40
3.	"I Do" (featuring Tiwa Savage)	Okoye; Tiwatope Savage	Shugavybz	3:15
4.	"Boyfriend"	Okoye	Shugavybz	3:55
5.	"Just Like That" (featuring Mohombi)	Okoye; Mohombi Moupondo	Mr. P	3:33
6.	"I Love You" (featuring Teni, Simi and Tamar Braxton)	Okoye; Teniola Apata; Simisola Ogunleye; Tamar Braxton	Goldswarm	3:52
7.	"I No Like Trouble"	Okoye	Shugavybz	3:41
8.	"Prodigal" (featuring DJ Switch)	Okoye; Obianuju Udeh	Goldswarm	3:58
9.	"Smooth Criminal"	Okoye	Goldswarm	3:34
10.	"Blessed"	Okoye	Sarmy Fire	3:50
11.	"Lola Diego" (featuring Singah)	Okoye; Okike	Goldswarm	3:07
12.	"Grow Old" (featuring Ovie Kelz)	Okoye; Ovie Kelz	Goldswarm	4:00
13.	"Eh Lo"	Okoye	DaiHard Beatz	4:48
14.	"Nobody"	Okoye	Kealzbeats	4:15
15.	"Fly Away"	Okoye	Goldswarm	3:24
16.	"Follow My Lead" (featuring Wande Coal)	Okoye; Oluwatobi Ojosipe	Sarmy Fire	4:00
Total length:				61:00

== Personnel ==
- Mr. P – production (1, 5)
- Shugavybz – production (2, 3, 4, 7)
- Goldswarm – production (6, 8, 9, 11, 12, 15)
- Sarmy Fire – production (12, 16)
- DaiHardBeats – production (13)
- Kealzbeats – production 14)
