= Best of Both Worlds (EP) =

EP by Kel-P and Wande Coal
- Released: 28 February 2025
- Genre: Afrobeats
- Length: 14:59
- Label: Jones Worldwide
- Producer: Kel-P (EP); Shay Jones (EP)

Kel-P chronology
Bully Season Vol.2 : Pretty Girls Love Afrobeats (2024)	Best of Both Worlds (2025)

Wande Coal chronology
Legend or No Legend (2023)	Best Of Both Worlds (2025)

Singles from Best of Both Worlds
- 1. "Old Soldier" Released: 12 December 2024

Best Of Both Worlds is a collaborative extended play by Nigerian singers Kel-P, and Wande Coal. It was released on 28 February 2025 through Jones Worldwide. No other artists were featured on the project, and the project was produced by Kel-P.

== Background ==
On 17 February 2025, Kel-P, and Wande Coal discussed the project with Wonderland.

On 19 February 2025, in an interview with DJ Edu, Kel-P discussed the project on 1Xtra's AfroSounds Show.

== Singles ==
On 12 December 2024, "Old Soldier" was released as the album's lead single.

On 7 February 2025, the music video was released and directed by Jyde Ajala.

== Track listing ==
Best Of Both Worlds track listing
No.	Title	Writer(s)	Producer(s)	Length
1.	"Old Soldier"	Udoma Kelvin Amba; Oluwatobi Wande Ojosipe	Kel-P	2:36
2.	"Best Of Both Worlds"	Kelvin; Oluwatobi	Kel-P	2:34
3.	"Ejo"	Kelvin; Oluwatobi	Kel-P	3:22
4.	"Call Again"	Kelvin; Oluwatobi	Kel-P	3:10
5.	"Die For You"	Kelvin; Oluwatobi	Kel-P	2:42
Total length:				14:59

== Personnel ==
- Kelvin "Kel-P" Amba – vocals, writer, producer, recording engineer, executive producer
- Oluwatobi "Wande Coal" Ojosipe – vocals, writer
- David "Shay Jones" Olakot – executive producer

== Release history ==
Region	Date	Format	Label
Nigeria	28 February 2025	Digital download	Jones Worldwide
