= Big Girl (Seyi Shay album) =

Studio album by Seyi Shay
- Released: 10 December 2021
- Recorded: 2021
- Studio: JWW Studio
- Genres: Afropop, R&B/Soul, Afro-swing
- Length: 34:43
- Labels: Stargurl Limited; Jones Worldwide
- Producers: PD; Kel-P; Bruno Spiritual-Vibes; Dr. Amir; GuiltyBeatz

Seyi Shay chronology
Seyi or Shay (2015)	Big Girl (2021)

Singles from Big Girl
- 1. "Pempe" Released: 7 May 2021

Big Girl is the second studio album by Nigerian R&B singer Seyi Shay. It was released on 10 December 2021, by Stargurl Limited. It was produced by Bruno Spiritual-Vibes, Kel-P, Dr. Amir, and GuiltyBeatz. The album was executive produced by Stargurl Limited (founder. Seyi Shay), and Jones Worldwide (co-founders. Shay Jones, & Wiz Jones), alongside co-executive producer Kel-P.

The album was dedicated to Edith Olabisi Joshua and Sound Sultan, and features BackRoad Gee, Calema, Shay Jones, Simi, Wande Coal, and Yemi Alade. Motolani Alakehe described the project elements as Afro-swing, R&B, Afro-pop, and Caribbean pop.

== Background ==
In January 2021, she signed a publishing deal with Universal Music Publishing Group division in France, with a partnership deal between Universal Music France, and Aristokrat Publishing, a division of Aristokrat Records, and a subsidiary of The Aristokrat Group. Shortly after the sixth edition of the Nigerian Idol, she began working on Big Girl, with Jones Worldwide. On June 9, 2021, Seyi Shay and Yemi Alade performed a live version of "Pempe" on Clout Studio.

== Singles ==
On 7 May 2021, she released the lead single of the album, "Pempe", featuring Yemi Alade, accompanied by a music video, released on 10 May 2021, and directed by Clarence Peters. The record peaked at 35 on TurnTable Top 50 chart.

== Critical reception ==
Professional ratings
Review scores
Source	Rating
Pulse Nigeria	7.9/10

Big Girl received generally favorable reviews from music critics. In a review for ModernGhana, Agwuma Kingsley wrote "Big Girl is Seyi Shay being innovative, being versatile as well as cherry-picking the right set of creators to accompany her current state of mind. The harmony of Big Girl is undeniable as much as the album sequencing, cohesiveness, proper record production, and the songwriting in particular". Reviewing for Pulse Nigeria, the music journalist Motolani Alake described the album and its title as a "self-explanatory title as her features elevated her music. It was nice to see her collaborate with her fellow female stars. But Calema and Shay Jones stand out from the bunch", and in conclusion, Motolani Alakehe said "the album suffers from a lack of obvious singles. Upon completion, ‘Pempe’ was clearly not the best single for the album. ‘Glowanna’ could be a single, but it would need an aggressive promo. ‘Big Girl’ isn't the greatest song, but it has strong TikTok potential".

== Track listing ==
No.	Title	Writer(s)	Producer(s)	Length
1.	"Maserati Sexy" (featuring. BackRoad Gee)	Deborah Oluwaseyi Joshua; BackRoad Gee	PD	2:59
2.	"Stamina" (featuring. Calema)	Deborah Oluwaseyi Joshua; António Mendes Ferreira; Fradique Mendes Ferreira	Bruno Spiritual-Vibes	3:14
3.	"Big Girl"	Deborah Oluwaseyi Joshua	Kel-P	2:57
4.	"Mine" (featuring. Shay Jones)	Deborah Oluwaseyi Joshua; David Olakot	Bruno Spiritual-Vibes	2:45
5.	"Let Me Know"	Deborah Oluwaseyi Joshua	PD	3:00
6.	"Glowanna" (featuring. Simi)	Deborah Oluwaseyi Joshua; Simisola Bolatito Kosoko	Dr. Amir	2:29
7.	"FWI"	Deborah Oluwaseyi Joshua	GuiltyBeatz	2:55
8.	"Why Do They"	Deborah Oluwaseyi Joshua	PD	3:13
9.	"By You"	Deborah Oluwaseyi Joshua	PD	3:15
10.	"Ride for You" (featuring. Wande Coal)	Deborah Oluwaseyi Joshua; Oluwatobi Wande Ojosipe	Kel-P	3:10
11.	"Outro"	Deborah Oluwaseyi Joshua	Kel-P	1:47
12.	"Pempe" (featuring. Yemi Alade)	Deborah Oluwaseyi Joshua; Yemi Eberechi Alade	Kel-P	2:59
Total length:				34:43

== Personnel ==
List of credits from Big Girl

- Deborah Oluwaseyi Joshua – vocals, songwriting, executive producer
- Jones Worldwide - executive producer
  - Shay Jones - vocals, songwriting (tracks 4)
  - Wiz Jones
- Kel-P – co-executive producer, production (tracks 3, 10, 11, 12)
- PD - production (tracks 1, 5, 8, 9)
- Bruno Spiritual-Vibes - production (tracks 2, 4)
- Dr. Amir – production (tracks 6)
- GuiltyBeatz – production (tracks 7)
- Dro – mixing, mastering (all tracks)

== Release history ==
Region	Date	Format	Version	Label
Various	10 December 2021	CD, digital download	Standard	Stargurl Limited; Jones Worldwide
