= Mr. P (singer) =

Nigerian singer (born 1981)

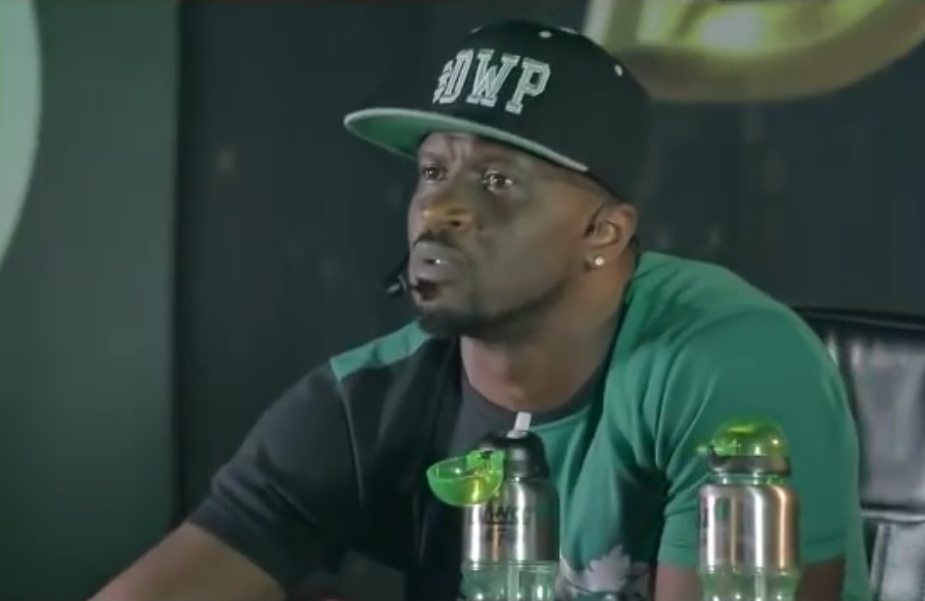
- Born: Peter Obumneme Okoye; November 18, 1981 (age 44); Jos, Plateau State, Nigeria
- Other name: Peter P-Square
- Occupations: Singer; songwriter; dancer; record producer
- Years active: 2003–present
- Works: Discography
- Spouse: Lola Omotayo
- Children: 2
- Relatives: Rudeboy (brother); Jude Okoye (brother)
- Musical career
- Origin: Ifite Dunu, Anambra, Nigeria
- Genres: Afrobeats; R&B; electronic; dance
- Instruments: Vocals
- Label: P-Classic

Peter Obumneme Okoye (born 18 November 1981 (Note: Following the feud with his twin brother whom he shares the same birth age, Mr. P, on 20 April 2026, in a post on X (Twitter), changed his birth date to 30 November.)), professionally known as Mr. P, is a Nigerian singer, songwriter, dancer, and record producer. He gained recognition in the early 2000s as a member of the music duo P-Square with his identical twin brother Rudeboy. In 2021, he was awarded an honorary doctorate from ESCAE University in Benin Republic.

== Early life and education ==
Peter Obumneme Okoye and his twin brother Paul grew up in a large family, in Jos in Plateau State, Nigeria. He was born into the family of Josephine Okoye and Mazi Moses Okoye. Peter and Paul joined a school of music and drama club, where they started dancing, singing and performing songs of popular artist like MC Hammer, Bobby Brown and Michael Jackson.

Peter Okoye attended St. Murumba secondary school, a Catholic school in Jos, Plateau State Nigeria. Later in 1999, he applied to the University of Abuja to study Business Administration, but didn't complete the degree.

== Solo career ==
In 2017, P-Square disbanded and both band members parted ways. Mr P first dropped his solo single titled "For My Head", "Cool It Down" in 2017.

In 2018, Mr. P collaborated with Nyanda of Brick & Lace on a song titled "Wokie Wokie". In 2021, Mr. P founded his own record label called P-Classic Records, the label has signed Nigerian activist and disc jockey DJ Switch and in 2021, he released a 16-track debut album titled, The Prodigal which featured Tiwa Savage, Simi, Teni, Wande Coal, Tamar Braxton, Singah, Mohombi, DJ Switch, and OvieKelz.

Mr. P played the role of Arinze in Genevieve Nnaji's Lionheart (2018).

== Personal life ==
In 2013, Okoye and his girlfriend, Lola Omotayo, welcomed a daughter in a San Francisco hospital in the United States. On 17 November 2013, the duo got married at the Ark in Lekki, Lagos, Nigeria.

== Endorsement deals ==
On June 16, 2016, Mr P was made a Kia motor ambassador. Mr. P was also made a brand ambassador for Olympic Milk, produced by Nutricima limited. Peter founded a reality TV show named Dance with Peter which was sponsored by Globacom Telecommunication Limited. In August 2021, he was unveiled as the brand ambassador of Adidas, a manufacturing company that deals with shoes, clothing and accessories.

== Discography ==
Albums

- The Prodigal (2021)

Singles

- "Cool It Down" (2017)
- "For My Head" (2017)
- "My Way" (2018)
- "Look Into My Eyes" (2018)
- "Ebeano (Internationally)" (2018)
- "Penalty Dance" (featuring DJ Switch) (2018)
- "Wokie Wokie" (featuring Nyanda) (2018)
- "Karma" (2019)
- "One More Night" (featuring Niniola) (2019)
- "Too Late" (2019)
- "Like Dis Like Dat" (2019)
- "Follow My Lead" (featuring Wande Coal) (2020)
- "Winning" (2024)
- "Attention" (2024)
- "Odo (Remix)" (with Stonebwoy) (2025)
- "I Can't Look Away" (2026)
- I Love You Because (2026)

== Awards and nominations ==
- Won Best International Male Artist, International Achievement Recognition Awards, 2018
