= Majeeed =

Nigerian singer

- Born: Ekeh Chiaka Joseph; November 28; Lagos
- Citizenship: Nigerian
- Education: Iscom University Benin
- Occupations: Singer; songwriter; producer
- Years active: 2020–present
- Parents: Nze Oliver (father); Nze Grace (mother)
- Musical career
- Genres: Afrofusion; afropop
- Instruments: Vocals
- Labels: Dream Empire Music; EMPIRE

Ekeh Chiaka Joseph (born November 28) known professionally as Majeeed is a Nigerian afropop singer and songwriter signed to Dream Empire Music. He is known for his breakthrough single "Yawa No Dey End", released in 2022 as the lead single off his extended play Bitter Sweet. On 29 April 2022, a new version of "Yawa No Dey End", was released with Joeboy, through Dream Empire Music, and emPawa Africa, which peaked at number 41 on the Nigeria TurnTable Top 50 chart, on the week of May 9, 2022.

He was cited as one of the 10 African Artists You Should Know by Audiomack, after he surpassed 1 million streams in April 2022. On 11 July 2022, "Yawa No Dey End" debuted on the newly launched TurnTable Top 100, an expansion of the Top 50, at number 59. On 13 July 2022, following the initial launch of the TurnTable Top Afro-Pop Songs chart, "Yawa No Dey End" debuted at number 30. On 16 July 2022, he was cited as one of the artists on the initial issue of the TurnTable Artiste Top 100 chart, and debuted at number 80.

== Early life ==
Ekeh Chiaka Joseph was born on November 28 in Lagos to Nze Oliver and Nze Grace. He hails from Imo, a state in the south east region of Nigeria. He relocated to Ogun State at the age of eight. He had his primary education at Iyana Ipaja, in Lagos State, and his secondary education in Ogun State, before proceeding to Cotonou, for his tertiary education at Iscom University Benin, where he graduated with a BSc in Mass Communication. On 6 February 2022, he told Ayo Makinde, and Alero Edu on Sunrise, "I started music, while I was in secondary school; in JSS2, that time I use to kolobi my mom's money to go to the studio, and just make music."

== Career ==
Majeeed began his music career as a songwriter to Seyi Shay. In 2020, he released two promotional singles, titled "Gee For Life", and "Rocky Lo", which features Seyi Shay. "Rocky Lo" was made available for free downloads. Late 2020, he began learning music production. In February 2022, he told Vangaurd, "I produced 'Time' at Harrysong's house." On 19 February 2021, Majeeed released "Time", as the first single from his EP Bitter Sweeet.

In the second quarter of 2021, he signed a record deal with Dream Empire Music on 20 August, and was on the line-up for the 2021 edition of the Felabration, held at New Afrika Shrine on October 11. At Big Girl listening party on November 20, 2021, Seyi Shay called out Majeeed, as the primary writer of Big Girl studio album. She said, "I don tell everybody, say you write all the songs, way they for this album". He opened for BNXN (formerly Buju) at Buju Live in Concert in Lagos, held on 22 December 2021.

On 6 January 2022, he released an acoustic version of "Time", as his first official single under Dream Empire Music. He achieved mainstream with "Yawa No Dey End", a record co-signed by Don Jazzy, and Tiwa Savage. On 16 April 2022, he covered Pulse Nigeria Future Sounds playlist. and re-released "Yawa No Dey End" with Joeboy, through emPawa on 29 April 2022. It debut at number 41 on TurnTable Top 50. On 3 May 2022, he was cited as one of the Best New Artists, by The Native, among other artists.

On 7 May 2022, he opened for Reminisce, CDQ, and Terry Apala at Urban Live, a music concert curated by Urban96 Radio Network monthly. On 26 June 2022, he was on the line-up of Funbi's Bus, The Journey So Far edition, and Mainland Block Party, Music is Life edition, alongside Ice Prince, and Blaqbonez. On 2 July 2022, he released the official music video for "No Room For Love", directed by Olu the Wave, and featured a cameo appearance from Sylvia Adora, a Nigerian actress known for her role in Papa Benji.

On 27 July 2022, he was named Apple Music 'Up Next' Artist in Nigeria. On 30 July 2022, Majeeed sold-out his first solo international concert in Mauritius, named after the most played song on his ep in Mauritius, "Smile For Me". On 1 August 2022, "Smile For Me" reached number one on Mauritius Apple Music Top Songs. On 5 August 2022, "No Room For Love" debut on TurnTable. It peaked at number 11 on Bubbling Under Top 100, number 14 on Top Afro-R&B Songs and number 9 on NXT Emerging Top Songs.

The Tiwa Savage-assisted track "Gbese" was released on 22 February 2023, through Dream Empire Music and published by EMPIRE. It was produced by Masterkraft. The song debuted at 38 on the Official Nigeria Top 100 and at number 26 on the Nigeria Top Afro-POP Songs. On 4 May 2023, the music video for "Gbese" was released and directed by Clarence Peters for Dream Empire Music and EMPIRE. In May 2023, Majeeed performed "Gbese" with Tiwa Savage at Africa Magic Viewers’ Choice Awards held in Lagos.

The Bnxn-assisted track "Waka Jeje" was released on 5 July 2023 off Cheers To Life. EP, as the third single. The song debuted at 73 on the Official Nigeria Top 100. On 6 September 2023, Cheers To Life. was released through EMPIRE for Dream Empire Music. In November 2023, he was featured by Super Eagles on the official theme song "Let's Do It Again". On 11 January 2024, he leads the national anthem and performed the AFCON theme song at the Send Forth Dinner Party held in Lagos State Governor's House.

On 6 June 2024, Dream Empire Music managing director and senior A&R; Raymond Ifie reveals Dream Empire Music and EMPIRE's plan for Majeeed to release a 2-pack single each month, from June to August. On 7 June 2024, Majeeed released the first pack-singles titled "California / Rollercoaster (Laba Laba)". "California" was produced by Mystro during his California trip, while "Rollercoaster (Laba Laba)" was produced by Ceecee Beatz. It's accompanying visual for "California" was shot by D6ix and Brandon in California.

On 8 September 2024, Majeeed signed an endorsement deal with BetBaba, an online sports betting company.

== Artistry ==
Majeeed is known for fusing Afrobeats. He tells Chinonso Ihekire of The Guardian, "I came up with the name five years ago, and chose to use the name, because it embodies my attributes as a person. Majeed means noble, or magnificent, in Arabic". He cited Tope Alabi, Chief Osadebe, Oliver De Coque, and Baba Ara, as his early musical influence. On 9 March 2022, he spoke about his music journey, and personal life, aside being an artiste, songwriter, and an aspiring producer, on Television Continental program E-Splash.

== Discography ==
=== EPs ===
List of studio extended plays, with selected details and chart positions
Title	Details	Peak chart positions
Title	Details	NG
Bitter Sweet	Released: 25 March 2022; Formats: Digital download, streaming	
Cheers To Life.	Released: 6 September 2023; Formats: Digital download, streaming	34

=== Singles ===
List of charted singles, with selected chart positions
Title	Year	Peak chart positions			Certifications	Album
Title	Year	NG	UK	US	Certifications	Album
"Time"	2021	—	—	—		Bitter Sweet
"Yawa No Dey End"	2022	—	—	—		Bitter Sweet
"Yawa No Dey End (remix)" (With. Joeboy)	2022	41	—	—		Non-album single
"Stop Nonsense"	2022	91	—	—		Cheers To Life.
"Gbese" (with. Tiwa Savage)	2023	38	—	—		Cheers To Life.
"Waka Jeje" (featuring. Bnxn)	2023	73	—	—		Cheers To Life.
"California"	2024	—	—	—		TBA
"Rollercoaster (Laba Laba)"	2024	—	—	—		TBA
"Will I?"	2024	—	—	—		TBA

List of charted singles as a featured artist, with selected chart positions
Artist	Title	Year	Peak chart positions			Certifications	Album
Artist	Title	Year	NG	UK	US	Certifications	Album
Dream Empire Music	"Ogaju"	2021	—	—	—		TBA
Verchi	"Mix up Liquor"	2021	—	—	—		TBA
Drexbeats	"Debe"	2021	—	—	—		Safari Vibes
Lisa Viola	"Lagos"	2022	—	—	—		Mixed Feelings
Balloranking	"Fine Girl"	2022	—	—	—		Trench Kid
Crowd Kontroller	"Industry Sentiment"	2022	—	—	—		TBA
XBusta	"1 billi"	2023	—	—	—		Xbusta Xuper Xtar Xtatus (XXX)
Ifydino	"Duty"	2023	—	—	—		Ifydino The EP
Camidoh & Harrysong	"Asante"	2023	—	—	—		God Amongst Men
Super Eagles & EMPIRE	"Let's Do It Again"	2023	—	—	—		AFCON Theme Song
Masterkraft	"Fruit"	2023	—	—	—		TBA
Bloody Civilian	"Family Meeting"	2023	—	—	—		Anger Management: At LEasT wE tRIED
Del B	"Luv You"	2024	—	—	—		Del Beast
Konstance	"My Heart"	2024	—	—	—		In The Beginning
Kelvin Jones	"MONEY"	2024	—	—	—		TBA

=== Other charted songs ===
List of other charted songs, with year released, selected chart positions, and album name shown
Title	Year	Peak chart positions			Album
Title	Year	NG	UK	US	Album
"No Room For Love"	2022	— (Note: "No Room For Love" did not enter the TurnTable Top 100, but peaked at number 11 on Bubbling Under Top 100.)	—	—	Bitter Sweet
"Cry (shayo)" (feat. Lojay)	2023	90	—	—	Cheers To Life.

=== Promotional singles ===
List of promotional singles
Title	Year	Album
"Gee For Life"	2020	Non-album single
"Rocky Lo" (featuring Seyi Shay)	2020	Non-album single

=== Guest appearances ===
List of non-single guest appearances, with other performing artists, showing year released and album name
Title	Year	Other artist(s)	Album	Release date
"Banana" (featuring. Majeeed)	2020	DJ Xclusive	The XFiles EP Session1	28 February 2020
"Need More" (featuring. Majeeed)	2021	Jay Pizzle	Voltage	12 March 2021

== Songwriting credits ==
Song title, original artist, album of release, and year of release
Song	Artist(s)	Writer(s)	Album	Year	Note(s)	Ref.
"Give Me Chop"	Stainless featuring Seyi Shay	Stainless, Majeeed	In My Head	2021	Seyi Shay verse	
"Let Me Know"	Seyi Shay	Majeeed	Big Girl	2022	Songwriter	
"Stamina"	Seyi Shay featuring. Calema	Majeeed, Calema	Big Girl	2022	Co-wrote	
"No Wahala (Remix)"	1da Banton featuring Kizz Daniel & Tiwa savage	1da Banton, Kizz Daniel, & Majeeed	TBA	2022	Tiwa savage verse	
