= Realms (EP) =

EP by Wande Coal
- Released: 11 September 2020
- Genre: Afro pop; Afro&B
- Length: 22:00
- Label: Starstruck Management; Empire
- Producer: Sarz; Melvitto; Lekka Beatz; Dapiano; Screwface; The Sharpshutaz; Pheelz

Wande Coal chronology
Wanted (2015)	Realms (2020)	Legend or No Legend (2023)

Singles from Realms
- 1. "Vex" Released: 31 October 2019; 2. "Ode Lo Like" Released: 12 December 2019; 3. "Again" Released: 6 February 2020; 4. "Naughty Girl" Released: 26 June 2020

Realms is the first EP by Nigerian singer Wande Coal. It was released on 11 September 2020, through Starstruck Management and Empire Distribution. Following up to his second studio album, Wanted (2015), it features guest appearances from rapper Wale and producer Sarz. Production was handled by Sarz, Melvitto, Lekka Beatz, Dapiano, Screwface, The Sharpshutaz, and Pheelz.

== Background ==
Realms marked Wande Coal's third project in five years, after the release of Wanted (2015). Wande Coal announced the release of Realms on 14 December 2019, where the EP was teased to drop on 6 March 2020, after Wande signed with Empire Distribution. Later, on 8 September 2020, it was eventually revealed, via his Twitter account, that Realms would be released within less than 48 hours, just for it to release on 11 September 2020.

== Singles ==
The EP's lead single "Vex" was released on 31 October 2019, and features production from Sarz and Screwface. Sarz is also credited to be featured on the track. The second single "Ode Lo Like" was released on 12 December 2019, and was produced by Dapiano and Screwface. The Melvitto and Screwface-produced third single off the EP, "Again," was released on 6 February 2020. The fourth and final single "Naughty Girl" was released on 26 June 2020. It was produced by Pheelz.

== Critical reception ==
Realms received mixed reviews from music critics. Tami Makinde of The Native said Wande Coal was "a certified hitmaker" with an "insane knack for melody", describing the EP as "familiarly beautiful" and "nothing feels out of place", and concluded that "Realms seems like a conciliatory offering hinged on the prospect that there’s more to come". Motolani Alake of Pulse Nigeria called Realms a "lazy attempt at a project release" and said it should not have been released because it had "just two new songs on a seven-track EP", arguing that it relied on "strategy… more than good music". He added that it offered "nothing new" and concluded it was a "lesson in what shouldn’t be done", giving it a 3.5/10 rating.

== Track listing ==
All tracks written by Oluwatobi "Wande Coal" Ojosipe.

Realms track listing
No.	Title	Producer(s)	Length
1.	"Again"	Melvitto; Screwface	2:36
2.	"Check"	Lekaa Beats; Screwface^{[b]}	3:30
3.	"Naughty Girl"	Pheelz	2:45
4.	"Ode Lo Like"	Dapiano; Screwface	3:21
5.	"Ever Blazin"	The Sharpshutaz	3:16
6.	"Vex" (featuring Sarz)	Sarz; Screwface	3:30
7.	"Again" (remix; featuring Wale)	The Sharpshutaz	3:11
Total length:			22:00

Notes

- ^{^[b]} signifies a co-producer

== Personnel ==
- Oluwatobi "Wande Coal" Ojosipe – vocals, songwriter
- Olubowale "Wale" Akintimehin – vocals
- Sarz – production
- Melvitto – production
- Lekka Beatz – production
- Dapiano – production
- The Sharpshutaz – production
- Pheelz – production
- Screwface – production, executive producer
- Trehy Harris – mixing engineer

== Release history ==
Release history and formats for Realms
Region	Date	Format	Label
Various	11 September 2020	Streaming; digital download	Starstruck Management; Empire
