= DJ Bally =

Nigerian Disc jockey and reality television personality

Bally B
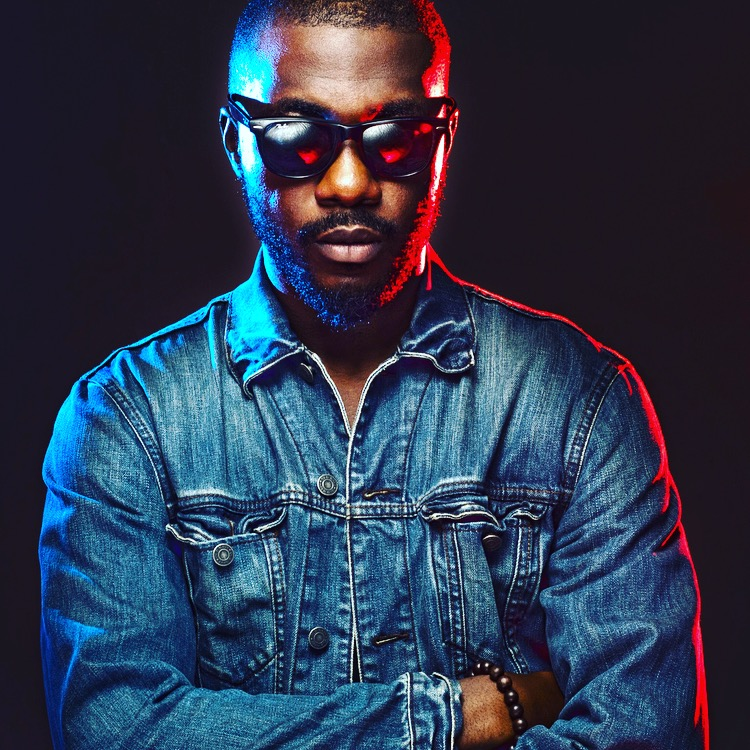

Background information
- Also known as: Bally B
- Born: Bobai Balat
- Genres: House; EDM; hip house; R'n'B; Afrobeats; Naija
- Occupations: Disc jockey; record producer; voiceover artist; reality television personality
- Years active: 2006–present
- Label: Aristokrat Records

Bobai Balat, also known by his stage name Bally B., is a Nigerian disc jockey, record producer, voiceover artist, and reality television personality. He gained popularity as one of the housemates of the Big Brother Naija 2017 reality game show, a localized Nigerian franchise of the Dutch game show Big Brother. Among other jobs, he has worked as a school teacher in Lagos as well as a statistician for the Federal Government. He is a baritone, known as Baritone Bally in Big Brother Naija. In 2015, Balat created an Afro-infused electronic bootleg remix to Rihanna's hit song FourFiveSeconds, which brought industry recognition and led to a mash-up segment on Lagos City's radio station, The Beat 99.9 FM.

== Early life and career ==
Growing up in a household with 3 music-loving elder siblings played a huge role in crafting his music passion and style. He spent most of his adolescence years in Kaduna before moving to Nigeria's capital, Abuja at the age of 10, where he had his secondary education at Loyola Jesuit College. He started his university education in 2006 at Purdue University, studying there for two years before transferring to the American University of Nigeria for personal reasons. However, it was while still at Purdue University that Balat's love for music production and disc jockeying began after he befriended a fellow Nigerian rapper at his school. His rapper friend introduced him to the popular production software FL Studio, and Balat started trying his hand at music production. He then also decided to volunteer to disc jockey at different recreational spots around the Chicago area, where he became more acquainted with being a disc jockey, as well as increase his confidence behind the turntables. After moving to the American University of Nigeria, Balat decided to take his passion for music even further, becoming the popular go-to DJ not only within the University but also around town. He was also the only one with a music studio in his dorm in school, therefore monopolising all music production and engineering done by students on campus while at the same time raising capital to enable him to buy more equipment.

Having grown up on his elder sibling's diverse record collection, from soulful 80s hip-hop and R&B to the higher-tempo rhythmic progressions of Makossa, combined with Balat's affinity for the more electronic synth sounds coming out of Europe at the time, Balat ended up with a mixed spectrum of musical influence. Today, this variety of genre influences translates into sets where Balat picks apart, infuses, and transitions between several genres, from contemporary Afrobeats to electronic dance music, hip-hop, and trap.

=== Music career ===
During his rise to prominence, Balat became affiliated with a major record label in the Nigerian music industry, Aristokrat Records, the label responsible for bringing singer-songwriter Burna Boy to the limelight. Together, Balat and the label produced several successful Afro-infused remixes and mash-ups to popular international hits. He has officially released one single called "Ali" (2015), featuring then-label mate MoJeed and popular Abuja-based rapper Sute. Bally is an example of a new breed of DJs coming out of Africa, which delve heavily into the production and engineering of mash-ups, remixes, and original tracks mostly in the EDM genre, while also infusing elements of Afrobeats.

=== DJ and Production career ===
Bally began his musical journey while still in high school, creating playlists and arranging music for major social events and parties. He, however, bought his first set of turntables and began working as an active disc jockey while at Purdue University. Along with his housemates, he became well known for organizing parties all around campus as a disc jockey for an eclectic mix of students with varying musical tastes. Since then, Balat has held several club residencies around the world, he is founding DJ of the Grotto Fashion Club in Abuja, Nigeria, and progressed to a resident stint at the Gatecrasher Club in Nottingham, while still touring the United Kingdom and playing various gigs. He has also been called upon to play alongside some of the biggest names in Afrobeats music today.

Over the last couple of years, he has been putting more emphasis into being a record producer, putting out a long array of music projects along the way. His goal has been to spearhead the EDM movement in Africa while spreading the genre of Afrobeats music to the rest of the world. Therefore, his mash-ups and remixes infuse both contemporary African rhythms and vocals with the piercing synth sounds of electronic dance music, producing a type of music that is not commonly heard outside of Africa. His productions, though geared towards certain genres, remain highly experimental, reminiscent of early Diplo. His mash-up series "Mash-Up Mondays," where he releases a brand new mash-up every Monday, is currently hosted on The Beat 99.9 FM radio station during the Morning Rush show.

In May 2025, Balat served as a member of the global Creator Content jury at the 2025 D&AD Awards in London, becoming the only African representative on the inaugural panel for that category.

=== Acting ===
Balat delved into music and film almost at the same time while in secondary school and took part in various plays and dramas around campus. After completing his tertiary education, he came back to Nigeria and enrolled at the Royal Arts Academy, Surulere, to attain formal training in acting for both stage and film. With a series of short films under his belt, including The Art of Deceit by Cynthia Toyo (2008), Baby Mama by Kudus and a few TV appearances guest-hosting The Late Show on COOL TV.

=== Big Brother Naija ===
In 2017, he went in as one of an eventual 14 housemates on the second season of the popular reality game show Big Brother Naija 2017 (formerly known as Big Brother Nigeria), finishing as the 5th runner-up. The show's high ratings and overwhelming popularity sprung Balat, along with his other contesting housemates into household names in Nigeria, becoming popular in both social media and traditional media. The show also enabled Balat to discover a fresh talent previous unbeknownst to him, his baritone voice. His voice, along with his eyes and appearance, made him popular among female fans. After surviving 9 weeks without ever being up for nomination, he was eventually evicted in week 10, one week shy of the grand finale.

=== Bally Rally Movement ===
The Bally Rally Movement began in 2017 while Balat was still in the Big Brother House. It was the name coined by his fans to signify their support and movement behind him. However, after he was eventually evicted from the house, he came out to join the campaign and revamping it into a social cause to promote peace and youth empowerment through music. The Bally Rally movement has since been partitioned into two initiatives: "Bally Rally Outreach" and "Bally Rally Party". These two initiatives play out in various cities around Nigeria over the course of two days. The Bally Rally Outreach consists of charity-themed excursions to areas and institutions of lower social privilege, such as orphanages and IDP camps, to provide aid and support as a way of giving back to society. The Bally Rally Party, on the other hand, occurs on the next day and encompasses a mini carnival and music concert featuring numerous games, food, drinks, merchandise sales, and musical performances from artists and DJs alike.

== Discography ==
=== Mixes ===
- Dinner & Dessert (2015)
- Bally's Classic Hit-List, Vol. 1 (2015)
- Ballystic Radio (The Prequel 1 & 2) (2014–2011)
- Ultimate Party Mix (2011)
- TGIF Naija Edition (2011)
- Sex Music Vols. 1 & 2 (2011–2012)

=== Official Remixes ===
- Bigger Better Best (Bally Twerk Remix) Pucado (2014)
- For Me (Bally Dance Remix), Tolumide (2012)

=== Bootleg (Unofficial) Remixes ===
- Earned It (Afrotronic Remix) The Weekend (2015)
- FourFiveSeconds (Afrotronic Remix) Rihanna (2015)
- Call Me Maybe (Afrobeat Remix) Carly Rae Jepsen (2012)

=== MashUps ===
MashUp Mondays on the Beat 99.9fm (2014–present)

- My Moment (Bally Trippy MashUp)
- Pray To God (Bally Hideaway MashUp)
- Hell of a Night (Bally Spin MashUp)
- Shake Body (Bally U & Me MashUp)
- Skibo (Bally Shake MashUp)
- Johnny (Bally Sexy Waist MashUp)
- The Kick (Bally Epic MashUp)
- Personally (Bally Payback MashUp)
- Youngi Olowo (Bally Bounce MashUp)
- Why You Love Me (Bally Blow MashUp)

=== Original Tracks ===
- Ali ft. MoJeed & Sute (2015)

== See also ==
- List of Nigerian DJs
