= 960 Music Group =

Nigerian record company and artist management firm

- Type: Private
- Industry: Music and Entertainment
- Genre: Afropop; pop-rap; pop; R&B
- Founder: Efe Omorogbe (co-founder)
- Headquarters: Lagos, Lagos, Nigeria
- Key people: Mark Redguard; 2face Idibia; Piriye Isokrari
- Services: Record Label Financing; Intellectual Property
- Parent: Rio Africa
- Website: http://www.960music.com/

960 Music Group (also known as 960 Music), headquartered in Lagos, is a Nigerian record company, content owner, and artist management firm focused on providing diverse audio and visual entertainment across Nigeria. The company is headed by Mark Redguard.

Independent record labels under 960 Music include Hypertek Digital (2 Face, Sir Victor Uwaifo, Rocksteady and Dammy Krane), Aristokrat Records (Pucado, Kamar Tachio, Ozone, Mojeed and Leriq) and Ultima Productions (Geoffrey Oji). On 19 November 2014, 960 Music Group announced the addition of Password to the label on a management and promotions deal.

== History ==
960 Music Group was founded in 2013. It is funded by Rio Partners, and is the first music group in Nigeria to acquire different music labels and bring them together to form a big diversified group. 960 Music is considered as part of the "new school" evolution of African Music. In 2013, 960 Music Group acquired a 40 percent stake in Hypertek Records and Aristokrat Records, leading 960 Music to be listed on The NET's list of the "65 People, Places, Events And Things To Watch Out For In 2014". In mid-2013, Nigerian singer 2Face Idibia officially signaled the end of his former label, Hypertek Entertainment, and launched a new imprint, Hypertek Digital, under 960 Music.

On 29 November 2013, 960 Music Group, through one of its subsidiaries Hypertek Digital, signed Sir Victor Uwaifo. Uwaifo has over five hundred songs to his name, and was the first African to win a Golden Record. This move was to show that 960 Music is in the market to push through "old-school" acts whose relevance transcend the generational gap. Burna Boy also released his music video "Na So E Suppose Be" under the label.

== Partnership with Ultima Productions ==
On 27 October 2014, 960 Music announced a partnership with Ultima Productions aligning the two companies’ interests in driving digital growth, breaking new music barriers, and creating new marketing opportunities for MTN's Project Fame West Africa Season 7 finalists. The partnership would initially focus on the A&R, promotion, marketing, distribution and monetization of the Season 7 winner. It would also provide winners the opportunity to gain real-world experience after the show.

Mark Redguard, CEO of 960 Music Group, remarked that he was excited to work with one of the biggest talent producing shows in Nigeria and firmly believes that the partnership would be one of the most fruitful partnerships the Nigerian Music Industry had ever seen. Redguard continued:

The team at 960 Music understands that old formulas don’t work as well as they must in the digital age, and that we have to think differently to build a robust future for the music industry. Today, music companies and Media & Entertainment companies need to be more supportive of each other’s needs. This partnership begins that new era, and will help both companies thrive in the reality of the African Music Scene and the digital world".

— Mark Redguard,

960 Music Group, in conjunction with Ultima Productions, has commenced filming a reality TV show with Geoffrey Oji. The show, titled Project Fame Unplugged, is a Behind the Scenes television series designed to showcase the making of the Geoffrey music brand, and get all access to his entire creative process.

Under Ultima Productions/960 Music, MTN Project Fame, West Africa Season 7 winner, Geoffrey Oji, released his debut single titled 'Bursting My Brain'. The song was very well received by his old and new fans off the show.

== Best of MTN Project Fame 7.0 ==
In February 2015, 960 Music Group released the compilation album by finalists of season 7 of MTN's Project Fame West Africa. The album, which was executive produced by Mark Redguard and Password, consists of 13 songs produced by Password, Cobhams Asuquo, Wilson Joel, Royal Priest and Prodo. The album was included in the March edition of MyStreetz magazine, and is being given away for free through e-commerce retailer, Konga.com.

== Artists ==
=== Currents Acts ===
Act	Secondary Label	Releases (Singles) under 960 Music Group	E.P's under 960 Music Group	Albums under 960 Music Group
2face Idibia	Hypertek Digital	3		The Ascension
Dammy Krane	Hypertek Digital	7		The Enterkraner
Victor Uwaifo	Hypertek Digital	1		
RockSteady	Hypertek Digital	2		
Pucado	Aristokrat Records	3	Pukie The Great	
Kamar	Aristokrat Records	2	The Audition	
Mojeed	Aristokrat Records	5	Westernized West African	
Ozone	Aristokrat Records	2	Superiority Complex	
Leriq	Aristokrat Records	1		
Geoffrey Oji	Ultima Productions	1		
