= Wanted (Wande Coal album) =

2015 album by Wande Coal

Studio album by Wande Coal
- Released: 26 October 2015
- Genres: Afrobeats; R&B; hip-hop; highlife
- Length: 75:32
- Label: Black Diamond
- Producers: Sarz; Maleek Berry; Legendury Beatz; LeriQ; Major Bangz; J Fem; Da Beatfreakz; Xela

Wande Coal chronology
Mushin 2 Mo' Hits (2009)	Wanted (2015)	Realms (2020)

Singles from Wanted
- 1. "My Way" Released: 14 February 2013; 2. "Amorawa" Released: 29 November 2013; 3. "Baby Hello" Released: 5 April 2014; 4. "Ashimapeyin" Released: 1 July 2015; 5. "Same Shit" Released: 9 September 2015

Wanted is the second studio album by Nigerian singer Wande Coal. It was released by Black Diamond Entertainment on 26 October 2015. Following up to his 2009 debut, Mushin 2 Mo' Hits, the album features a number of other artists such as AKA, 2Face Idibia, Burna Boy, Maleek Berry, and Wizkid, along with production from Sarz, Maleek Berry, Legendury Beatz, LeriQ, Major Bangz, J Fem, da Beatfreakz, and Xela.

== Background ==
Wanted was released as Wande Coal's first album in six years, and his first since the breakup of Mo' Hits Records in 2011. After the breakup, he joined Don Jazzy at Mavin Records. In an interview with Vanguard, Wande Coal explained that he chose to continue working with Don Jazzy rather than D'banj, citing his close relationship with Jazzy and the latter's role as a producer. Although he was not signed to Mavin Records, he continued working with Jazzy out of respect for their relationship. The two had a disagreement in 2013, prompting Wande Coal to part ways with Jazzy and begin working on a new project. The album was nearly complete at the time, but his departure led him to restart the project, delaying its release.

Wande Coal announced the album's release on 16 October 2015. In a press release, he stated, "Finally, Black Diamond presents Wanted, my sophomore album. This is for the die hard fans, the critics, haters, the media houses and more importantly, those who never stopped believing. This is a reminder of who I was and who I have evolved into. This is where I want to be; Wanted."

== Singles ==
The album's lead single "My Way" was released on 14 February 2013. It was co-written and produced by Maleek Berry. The second single, "Amorawa", featuring Burna Boy was released on 29 November 2013. It was produced by LeriQ. The third single off the album "Baby Hello" was released on 5 April 2014 and was also produced by Maleek Berry. The fourth single, "Ashimapeyin" was released on 1 July 2015 and features production by Sarz. The fifth and final single "Same Shit" featuring AKA was produced by Da Beatfreakz. It was released on 9 September 2015. AKA, who was in Nigeria for a special edition of Industry Nite in Lagos, announced the collaboration on Twitter, stating that he was finishing a record with Wande Coal.

== Critical reception ==
Professional ratings
Review scores
Source	Rating
NotJustOk	5/10
tooXclusive	2/5 stars
Pulse Nigeria	3.5/5 stars
Jaguda	3.5/5 stars

Wanted received mixed reviews from music critics. Pulse Nigeria's Joey Akan wrote that Wanted showed Wande Coal as the "total package" and "at his best" with "character, rhythm, progression, twists and bounce," though he felt it was "more patchwork than conceptual album," concluding that "Wande Coal is back to his art," and rated it 3.5/5. Tola Sarumi, reviewing for NotJustOk, thought the album lacked focus and direction, writing that "there’s no artistic hunger here." She added that "the replay value… is very low" and concluded that "Wanted has been found wanting," while adding that "it's nice to see Wande Coal back as a pop performer," and rating it 5/10.

In a review for tooXclusive, Ogaga Sakpaide called Wanted a "fast food album" that showed "no artistic growth and depth," criticized its "misguided A&R direction" and "magnitude of mediocrity," and concluded that despite "rare flashes of brilliance," it fell short of expectations, rating it 2/5. A writer for Jaguda, going by the pseudonym Sifon, wrote that Wanted was "a good album, but not a great album," praising Wande Coal's "vocals that are unrivaled" and "top class" production on several tracks. He criticized parts as "unnecessarily boring," and concluded that "it is exactly what I expected from Wande," rating it 3.5/5. Music journalist Oris Aigbokhaevbolo, in a review for Music in Africa said the album was marked by "uneven production" and "forgettable lyrics." He called it a "losing game" and lamented that the skits referred to a "non-existent record". Dami Ajayi, in a review for Olisa.ng, wrote that Wanted "fails to address the question of new directions for his music and the growth expected over a six-year hiatus," arguing it was "neither a classic nor a collector’s item," that the "Don Jazzy factor is clearly missing," and concluding it was "at best a thrill for dancers and at worst a testimonial that Wande Coal shouldn’t be awarded all the credits for his great debut album."

=== Accolades ===
Awards and nominations for Wanted
Organization	Year	Category	Result	Ref.
The Headies	2016	Best R&B/Pop Album	Nominated	
The Headies	2016	Album of the Year	Nominated	

== Track listing ==
Wanted track listing
No.	Title	Writer(s)	Producer(s)	Length
1.	"Intro (Skit)" (featuring Seyi Law)		—	1:06
2.	"Adura"	Oluwatobi Ojosipe	Sarz	4:22
3.	"Superwoman"	Ojosipe	Xela	4:56
4.	"We Ball"	Ojosipe	Maleek Berry	3:19
5.	"Same Shit" (featuring AKA)	Ojosipe; Kiernan Forbes	Da BeatFreakz	3:24
6.	"Monster"	Ojosipe	Legendury Beatz	3:25
7.	"Skit" (featuring Falz)		—	1:34
8.	"Wanted"	Ojosipe	Major Bangz	4:14
9.	"African Lady"	Ojosipe	Maleek Berry	3:16
10.	"Ashimapeyin"	Ojosipe	Sarz	3:48
11.	"Weekend" (featuring Maleek Berry)	Ojosipe; Maleek Shoyebi	Maleek Berry	3:50
12.	"Plenty Love"	Ojosipe	Maleek Berry	3:26
13.	"Skit" (featuring IamJimmie)		—	0:45
14.	"Make You Mine" (featuring 2Face Idibia)	Ojosipe; Innocent Idibia	Legendury Beatz	3:16
15.	"Lowkey"	Ojosipe	Maleek Berry	3:13
16.	"Iyawo Mi"	Ojosipe	J Fem	3:28
17.	"Jelly"	Ojosipe	Maleek Berry	2:51
18.	"Baby Hello"	Ojosipe	Maleek Berry	3:29
19.	"Wanted" (remix; featuring Burna Boy)	Ojosipe; Damini Ogulu	Sarz	4:48
20.	"Kpono" (featuring Wizkid)	Ojosipe; Ayodeji Balogun	Maleek Berry	3:02
21.	"Outro" (featuring King Spesh)		—	1:06

Bonus tracks
No.	Title	Writer(s)	Producer(s)	Length
22.	"Amorawa" (featuring Burna Boy)	Ojosipe; Ogulu	LeriQ	4:02
23.	"My Way"	Ojosipe; Maleek Shoyebi	Maleek Berry	3:57
Total length:				75:32

Notes

- "—" denotes a skit

== Release history ==
List of release dates, showing region, formats, label, editions and reference
Region	Date	Format(s)	Label	Edition(s)
Worldwide	26 October 2015	CD; digital download	Black Diamond	Standard edition
