= Gbese (song) =

Single by Majeeed and Tiwa Savage

from the EP Cheers To Life.
- Released: 22 February 2023
- Genre: Afropop
- Length: 2:43
- Label: Dream Empire Music; EMPIRE; EMPIRE Africa
- Songwriters: Ekeh Chiaka Joseph; Tiwatope Omolara Savage
- Producer: Masterkraft

Majeeed singles chronology
| "Stop Nonsense" (2022) | "Gbese" (2023) | "Waka Jeje" (2023) |

Tiwa Savage singles chronology
| "Loaded" (2022) | "Gbese" (2023) | "Who Is Your Guy? (Remix)" (2023) |

"Gbese" (English: "Trouble") a song by Nigerian singer-songwriter Majeeed and Tiwa Savage, was released on 22 February 2023 by Dream Empire Music, and EMPIRE as the second lead single on his debut extended play Cheers To Life.. The original song was produced by Masterkraft. An EDM version of the song was released as a bonus track on the extended play, and produced by Mystro.

== Background ==
Majeeed's opening track of 2023 "Gbese", a song with a guest vocal from Afrobeats Queen Tiwa Savage, came shortly after the success of his previous single "Stop Nonsense" released in 2022.

== Commercial performance ==
On 4 March 2023, Rhythm 93.7 FM Lagos named "Gbese" Rhythm Hit Song of the Week. On 6 March 2023, "Gbese" debuted at number 19 on Nigeria's Radio. On 8 May 2023, "Gbese" debuted at 38 on Official Nigeria Top 100 chart. On 29 May 2023, "Gbese" debuted at number 26 on Nigeria Top Afro-Pop Songs chart, and peaked at number 67 on the official Nigeria Streaming Songs chart. "Gbese" debuted on Cool FM Nigeria tastemakers charts at number 5.

== Music video, and other releases ==
An unofficial video titled "Gbese Visualizer)" was released on 22 February 2023, and edited by D6ix. As of January 2023, it has received 1.8 million views on YouTube. The music video for "Gbese" was directed by Clarence Peters, and released on 4 May 2023. As of January 2023, it has received 7.2 million views on YouTube.

== Critical reception ==
"Gbese" was met with positive reviews. Adeayo Adebiyi, a music reporter for Pulse Nigeria described the artist's combined efforts as "infectious."

=== Rankings ===
Select rankings of "Gbese"
| Publication | List | Rank | Ref. |
|---|---|---|---|
| Pulse Nigeria | Top 10 songs of Q1 2023 | 10 | |

== Charts ==
Performance for "Gbese"
| Chart (2023) | Peak position |
|---|---|
| Nigeria TurnTable Top 100 (TurnTable) | 38 |
| Nigeria Top Afro-Pop Songs (TurnTable) | 26 |
| Nigeria Turntable Top 50 Airplay (TurnTable) | 19 |
| Nigeria Official Streaming Songs (TurnTable) | 67 |
| The Tastemakers (Cool FM Nigeria) | 5 |

== Release history ==
| Region | Date | Format | Label |
|---|---|---|---|
| Various | 22 February 2023 | Digital download; streaming | Dream Empire Music; EMPIRE |
