= Paul O =

Nigerian show promoter and record exec (born 1967)

Paul Okoye
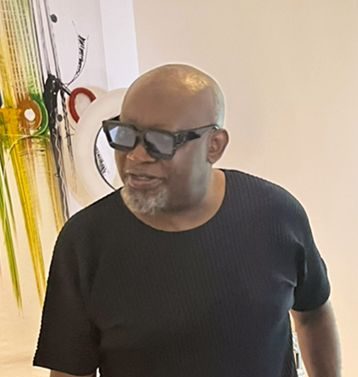
- Born: Paul Okoye; April 21, 1967 (age 59); Anambra State
- Other names: Paulo Okoye; Paul Okoye
- Occupations: Event promoter Talent manager Record exec
- Years active: 2002 - date
- Organizations: Upfront and Personal Global Management; One Africa Music Fest; One Africa Global Foundation; Cartel Records
- Title: CEO
- Awards: The Headies 2019 Special Recognition Award

Paul Okoye// (born 21 April 1967), also known as Paulo Okoye or Paul O, is a Nigerian event promoter, talent manager, record exec, philanthropist and businessman.

== Talent management ==
Okoye is the CEO of Upfront and Personal Global Management, that manage Kizz Daniel, Dakore Egbuson-Akande, Tekno, Iyanya, Flavour, amongst others. Big Brother Naija housemates Mercy Eke and Erica Nlewedim are also under his management. He was the manager to former Nigeria national football team captain, Jay Jay Okocha. Multinationals among its clientele in Nigeria include Pepsi, MTN, Nigerian Breweries, Samsung, Nike, Heineken, Hennessy, etc. He facilitated the Davido, Tekno, Burna boy and Tiwa savage pepsi deals. He also facilitated the Burna boy/Star Lager deal.

He was part of the team that cemented Tekno's deal with Sony Music.

== Event promoter ==
He is the organizer of the One Africa Music Fest. The show takes African music to the diaspora and it has been held in the UK, US, and UAE. The show has fintech company Interswitch as its headline sponsor, and Air Peace as its airline sponsor. It has had the performances of artistes like Wizkid, Davido, Burna Boy, 2Baba, Tiwa Savage, Tekno, Zlatan Ibile, Olamide, Harmonize, Jah Prayzah, Akothee, Vanessa Mdee, Kcee, Diamond Platnumz, Busiswa, D12, Wurld, Kranium, Flavour, Bella Shmurda, Rema, Kwaw Kese, Töme, DJ Spinall, DJ Cuppy, DJ Obi, DJ Xclusive.

On 4 December 2022, he was listed by the Nigerian national newspaper This Day as top show promoter alongside Paulash Panache, and smade, among others

== Record exec ==
He is a fifty percent co-owner of record label, Cartel Music. Tekno owns the remaining half.

== Foundation ==
Okoye partnered with Multichoice during the COVID-19 pandemic. Apart from giving out relief materials and raising funds for people affected by the pandemic one way or another, they also hosted a televised Hope For Africa concert. Apart from the music performances by singers such as 2Baba, Diamond Platnumz, Waje, Cobhams Asuquo and Betty G, the concert had various Nigerian celebrities in attendance, offering goodwill messages to those at home due to the lockdown.

In a bid to end world hunger, and also extreme poverty, Okoye, through One Africa Global Foundation, donated one hundred thousand dollars ($100,000) to an organization dedicated to empowering young people with skills, education and jobs, thereby achieving the Sustainable Development Goals (SDG).

== Recognition ==
In 2015, Okoye was celebrated by Chivas Regal, who hosted a red carpet event tagged Taste of Luxury, in his honor. The dinner had performances by American performers 112, NEXT and Jagged Edge. And was attended by friends and well-wishers including Audu Maikori, Banky W, Chidinma, Ayo Makun, Tee-Y Mix, Toke Makinwa and Toolz.

In 2017, he was celebrated on his Golden jubilee anniversary with a cover page issue on Vanguard newspaper's lifestyle pullout Allure.

In the Headies 2019 awards, he won the Special Recognition Award.

== Personal life ==
Okoye moved to London at a young age. He has a son and a daughter. He lives in Lagos, London and Dubai. He is head of Igbo group, Ndigbo Royal Heritage Worldwide. He lost one of his best friends to COVID-19. He has a collection of luxury cars. He is dating Nigerian actress Iyabo Ojo.
