= Bully Season Vol.1 =

EP by Kel-P
- Released: 24 February 2023
- Recorded: 2020–2022
- Studio: JWW Studio
- Genre: Reggae; Afrobeat; Afro-Fusion
- Length: 13:17
- Label: Jones Worldwide; Virgin Music France; Universal Music France
- Producer: Kel-P (Executive producer); London; KdaGreat; Northboi; Krizbeatz; Iotosh

Singles from Bully Season Vol.1
- 1. "One More Night" Released: 20 January 2023

Bully Season Vol.1 is the first solo-extended play by Nigerian record producer Kel-P. The extended play was released on 24 February 2023, by Jones Worldwide, Virgin Music France, and Universal Music France. The album is a mixture of Afrobeat, Reggae, and Afro-Fusion. It was produced primarily by Kel-P, along with production from London, KdaGreat, Northboi, Krizbeatz, and Iotosh. The project was supported by one single "One More Night", in which his singing career was launched; as an Afro-Dancehall musician.

== Background ==
On 2 February 2023, Kel-P spoke to Earmilk; He says, “The inspiration came from a collaborative session involving Kdagreat the producer, myself, and a beautiful lady at the time. The hook “One More Night” came from a place where this same beautiful lady who was my main muse gave me so much pizazz that I just felt I needed to spend one more night with her. On 25 February 2023, he spoke with The Guardian about his extended play, he says “What inspired this Project was my life leading to this moment. My Journey through my career, including my wins, my losses, my relationships, and my work ethic. I want the listeners to feel happy and just dance.”

On 4 March 2023, Kel-P tells music journalist Chinonso Ihekire, what the title stands for; in his words, he says: “I am not a bully, because I don’t bully anybody. I know the word bully means violence and all of that, but in my own terminology, what I am trying to get the people to know is that Bully Season actually refers to my work ethic, all the work I have done. What I have passed through in my life as a producer, back and forth, making music for other people and all of that, and now I am trying to show myself to the world that ‘I can do all of these but you guys don’t know me yet.” On 8 March 2023, spoke to Rolling Stone; He said; “I was supposed to drop a project way earlier, in 2020. But that was a producer project, the kind of thing where a producer features a lot of artists. back and forth things happened on the business side, ups and downs. That whole situation made me.”

== Singles ==
On 20 January 2023, he launched his singing career with the release of "One More Night", through Jones Worldwide, Universal Music France, and Virgin Records France, with its accompanying music video directed by Damian Belden, and Luke Shaw.

== Track listing ==
No.	Title	Writer(s)	Producer(s)	Length
1.	"Tropicana Baby"	Udoma Peter Kelvin Amba	Krizbeatz; Kel-P	2:52
2.	"Sundress"	Udoma Peter Kelvin Amba	Iotosh	2:35
3.	"One More Night"	Udoma Peter Kelvin Amba	Kel-P; KdaGreat	2:42
4.	"True Love"	Udoma Peter Kelvin Amba	London; Kel-P	2:24
5.	"Feel Lucky"	Udoma Peter Kelvin Amba	Northboi; KdaGreat	2:44
Total length:				13:17

== Personnel ==
- Udoma Peter Kelvin Amba - Primary artist, producer, executive producer
- Shay Jones - A&R Executive
- Wiz Jones - A&R Executive
- Babajide ‘Ezra Jones’ Isikalu - A&R
- London - Producer
- KdaGreat - Producer
- Northboi - Producer
- Krizbeatz - Producer
- Iotosh - Producer
- Leandro “Dro” Hidalgo - Audio engineer

== Release history ==
Region	Date	Format	Version	Label
Various	24 February 2023	CD, digital download	Standard	Jones Worldwide; Virgin Music France; Universal Music France
