= Cheers to Life =

Cheers To Life.

EP by Majeeed
- Released: 7 September 2023
- Recorded: 2022–2023
- Venue: Lekki, Nigeria
- Studio: Dream Empire Music Studio
- Genre: Afrofusion; Afropop; R&B; soul
- Length: 22:03
- Label: Dream Empire Music; EMPIRE
- Producer: Hulla; Dr Amir Aladdin; SK Baddest; Ceecee Beatz; Masterkraft; P.Priime; Potter Anjor; Mystro

Majeeed chronology
Bitter Sweet (2022)	Cheers To Life. (2023)

Singles from Cheers To Life.
- 1. "Stop Nonsense" Released: 25 October 2022; 2. "Gbese" Released: 22 February 2023; 3. "Waka Jeje" Released: 5 July 2023; 4. "Cry (shayo)" Released: 7 December 2023

Cheers To Life is the second debut extended play by Nigerian singer-songwriter Majeeed. It was released on 7 September 2023 by Dream Empire Music, and EMPIRE. It was described by Daily Times, as a musical expression of gratitude, growth, and positive energy with an organic feel of Afrobeat. The EP is a mixture of Afrofusion, and Afropop, with R&B, and Soul percussive rhythms.

The EP was exclusively produced by Chimaobi C Mbataku, with A&R direction from Ramond Ifie, Charles Okolo, Bolaji Kareem, and Patrick-Ola Oyeyiola. Songs from the EP were produced by Masterkraft, Hulla, Dr Amir Aladdin, SK Baddest, Ceecee Beatz, P.Priime, Potter Anjor, and Mystro. The EP features Bnxn, Tiwa Savage, Rotimi, and Lojay, and peaked at number 34 on Official Nigeria Albums.

== Background and promotion ==
Prior to the release of "Gbese", Majeeed secured an international distribution deal with EMPIRE, in partnership with Dream Empire Music. On 24 October 2023, Majeeed spoke with CNN about his extended play Cheers To Life. on the African Voices Changemakers show on My Drive episode. He stated that he would love to collaborate with Rihanna and he already has the right song to record with her. He also added: "Am in a phase where am getting better and am more confident. Am going on my tour later this year."

== Singles ==
"Stop Nonsense" was released as the album's lead single on 25 October 2022, 6 months after the success of his previous project Bitter Sweet. On 31 October 2022, City 105.1 FM added the song to its playlist. On 30 November 2022, he released the music video for "Stop Nonsense", directed by Aje Filmworks. "Gbese" was released as the second lead single on 22 February 2023, and features Tiwa Savage. On 4 May 2023, he released the music video for "Gbese", directed by Clarence Peters. "Waka Jeje" was released as the third lead single on 5 July 2023, and features Bnxn.

=== Other releases ===
On 7 December 2023, Dream Empire Music and EMPIRE re-released "Cry (shayo)", featuring Lojay from the project. The promotional single was accompanied by a music video released on 18 December 2023, and directed by Jyde Ajala. On 29 January 2024, the song peaked on the Official Nigeria Top 100 at number 90 and peaked on the Nigeria Official Streaming Songs at number 68.

== Critical reception ==
Professional ratings
Review scores
Source	Rating
Pulse Nigeria	7.9/10
Afrocritik	6/10

Cheers To Life. received generally positive reviews from music critics. In a review for Pulse Nigeria, Adeayo Adebiyi says: “From the compositions, collaborations, and mindset, Majeeed has his eyes at the top and this writer believes he has what it takes to play in the big leagues.” He also added: “Majeeed's vocal texture is like a Hybrid of Kizz Daniel and Sean Tizzle.” In a review for Afrocritik, Emmanuel Daraloye says: “At the end of the twenty-two-minute spin, we have a body of work that further boosts Majeeed’s artistry, introducing him to newer heights, and revealing that he is a talented songwriter and an exceptional singer.”

Emmanuel Esomnofu of The Native described the project as "a colourful demonstration of his unique prowess, and if there’s anyone who thinks he’s resting on his laurels, then they haven’t heard this. There’s clearly a lot of journeys embedded within the young man, and his music seems to possess the grace necessary to see them through."

== Commercial performance ==
Cheers To Life. peaked at number 34 on the TurnTable Top 50 chart on the week of January 26, 2024.

== Track listing ==
Cheers To Life. track listing
No.	Title	Writer(s)	Producer(s)	Length
1.	"Cheers To Life"	Ekeh Chiaka Joseph	Dr Amir Aladdin	2:22
2.	"Girls Deserve More Money"	Ekeh Chiaka Joseph	SK Baddest; Ceecee Beatz	2:43
3.	"Waka Jeje" (featuring Bnxn)	Ekeh Chiaka Joseph; Daniel Etiese Benson	Hulla	2:28
4.	"Gbese" (with. Tiwa Savage)	Ekeh Chiaka Joseph; Tiwatope Savage	Masterkraft	2:43
5.	"Slip & Slide" (featuring Rotimi)	Ekeh Chiaka Joseph; Olurotimi Akinosho	P.Priime	2:57
6.	"Cry (shayo)" (featuring Lojay)	Ekeh Chiaka Joseph; Lekan Osifeso Jnr.	Ceecee Beatz; Potter Anjor	2:48
7.	"Stop Nonsense"	Ekeh Chiaka Joseph	Masterkraft	2:37

Bonus
No.	Title	Writer(s)	Producer(s)	Length
8.	"Gbese (EDM Version)"	Ekeh Chiaka Joseph	Mystro	3:25
Total length:				22:03

== Personnel ==
- Ekeh Chiaka Joseph - Primary artist, writer
- Dr Amir Aladdin - Production (tracks 1)
- SK Baddest - Production (tracks 2)
- Ceecee Beatz - Production (tracks 2, 6)
- Hulla - Production (tracks 3)
- Masterkraft - Production (tracks 4, 7)
- P.Priime - Production (tracks 5)
- Potter Anjor - Production (tracks 6)
- Mystro - Production (tracks 8)
- Ramond Ifie - A&R executive
- Charles Okolo - A&R executive
- Bolaji Kareem - A&R executive
- Patrick-Ola Oyeyiola - A&R executive

== Charts ==
Chart (2023)	Peak position
Nigeria (TurnTable Top 50)	34

== Release history ==
Region	Date	Format	Version	Label
Various	7 September 2023	CD, digital download	Standard	Dream Empire Music; EMPIRE
