= Geoffrey Oji =

Nigerian singer and songwriter

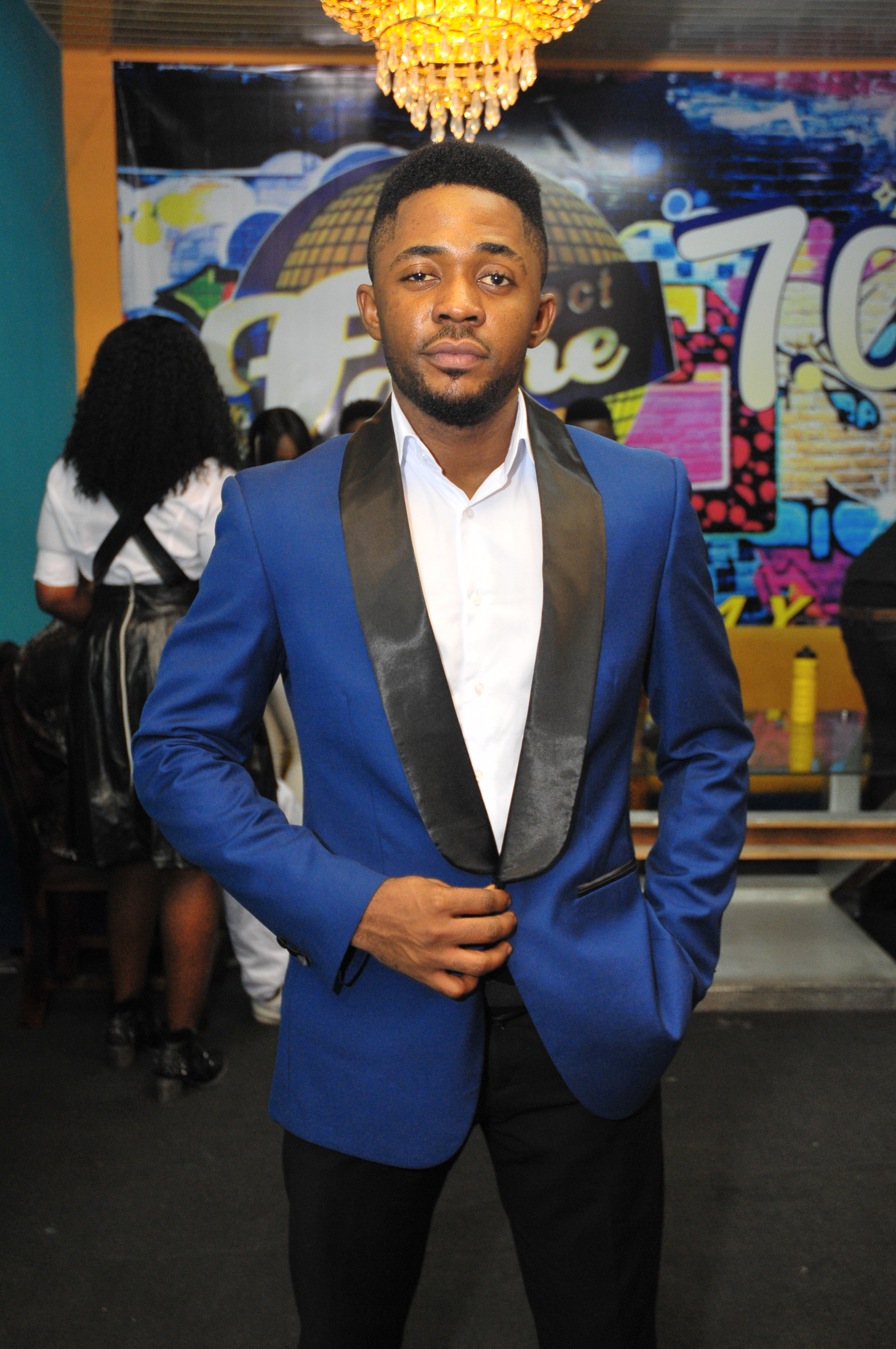

Background information
- Born: Geoffrey Oji; Kaduna, Kaduna State, Nigeria
- Origin: Benue State, Nigeria
- Genres: Pop
- Occupations: Singer, songwriter, performer
- Years active: 2014 – present
- Labels: Ultima Productions, 960 Music Group
- Website: geoffreyoji.com

Geoffrey Oji is a Nigerian singer and songwriter best known for winning the seventh season of Project Fame West Africa. He won the competition after years of consistently auditioning for the show. Geoffrey was under a management deal with 960 Music Group courtesy of a partnership between 960 Music Group and Ultima Productions. His debut single 'Bursting My Brain' was released on January 30, 2015.

== Early life ==
Geoffrey was born in Benue State and grew up in Kaduna, Kaduna State. He attended St. Saviour Primary and Nursery school, Kaduna and later, St. Patricks Secondary School, Kaduna. Geoffrey lost his dad on the Christmas Day of 2001, which made life difficult for his family, prompting his decision to leave home and move to Lagos in search for greener pastures when he was just 15.

On arriving in Lagos, Geoffrey found out his uncle in Lagos was not doing well enough to support him so he had to sleep in public places for about a year, while honing his music skills in church and contesting in singing shows. Before contesting in and winning the seventh season of Project Fame, Geoffrey auditioned in the first 6 seasons of the show and lost out.

== Musical career ==
After winning Project Fame in September 2014, Geoffrey spent the next few months performing at high-profile events, establishing a presence in the real world and recording music. On January 30, 2015, Geoffrey debuted his single, 'Bursting My Brain' which was well received by fans and critics alike and got moderate airplay on Nigerian radio stations.

The video to Bursting My Brain was released on May 25, 2015 which further boosted Geoffrey's profile and gained him more recognition when the video started airing on major TV networks.

Shortly after, 960 Music released Geoffrey's second single titled Monalisa, an ode to a beautiful woman and which can be described as a continuation to Bursting My Brain. A video for Monalisa directed by Mr. Miagi was released on that same day on the Project Fame platform. The single received even more positive reviews and further boosted Geoffrey's profile.

In October 2015, Geoffrey released his debut EP titled Bursted, which was launched on the last airing date of MTN Project Fame Season 8.
