= Pryme =

Nigerian singer-songwriter

- Born: Promise Chibuike Nwabueze Imo State
- Origin: Nigeria
- Genres: Afrofusion; Afropop
- Occupations: Singer; Songwriter
- Years active: 2017–present
- Labels: Fly Boy Inc; G-Worldwide

Promise Chibuike Nwabueze known professionally as Pryme, is a Nigerian Afropop singer and songwriter signed to G-Worldwide, and Fly Boy Inc. He rose to stardom after being featured on Kizz Daniel 2023 song "Show You Off" which debuted at number 1 on Nigeria Bubbling Under Top 100. (Note: "Show You Off" did not enter the TurnTable Top 100, but peaked at number 1 on Bubbling Under Top 100.) On 10 November 2023, Davido's Timeless studio album, was nominated at the 66th Grammy Awards and earned him, a special recognition from The Recording Academy as a composer on Timeless studio album for "Away".

== Early life ==
Pryme was born in Imo State, where he lived most of his life, before relocating to Lagos State. He had his tertiary education at Imo State University. In an interview with Kehinde Ajose, Chibuike said: “Music began for me when I was 10 years old. I started in the church choir. I knew I could sing, and I had an idea or two about composing lyrics and melodies. But professionally, music-making started when I was at Imo State University. I won a singing competition, and after that, things changed for me.”

== Career ==
In 2018, Pryme's debut into the music scene was met with critical acclaim when he released "Kilode" featuring Davido, and Peruzzi. On 27 August 2018, he released the music video for "Kilode", and achieved airplay with the song, produced by Fresh VDM. On 21 October 2022, he was credited as a songwriter on Iyanya's extended play The 6th Wave. On 31 March 2023, Pryme was credited as a songwriter on Davido's studio album Timeless, which earned him a special recognition from The Recording Academy.

On 27 July 2023, he appeared on Kizz Daniel's 5th studio album Maverick on "Show You Off". On 1 August 2023, Pryme signed a joint recording and publishing deal between Kizz Daniel's Fly Boy Inc, and Emperor Geezy's G-Worldwide Entertainment. On 30 November 2023, he released "Lavida", as his first official single under G-Worldwide. "Lavida" charted on Apple Music Nigeria, Spotify Nigeria, Shazam Nigeria, and Deezer Turkey. On 12 January 2024, he released the video for "Lavida", directed by A Kambi Pictures.

On 14 January 2024, "Lavida" music video premiered exclusively on MTV Base Africa in over 50 African countries, including Nigeria and South Africa. On 26 April 2024, Pryme released "Gbera" featuring Bella Shmurda, and produced by Xtofa. On 10 May 2024, "Gbera" music video was released and directed by A Kambi Pictures for G-Worldwide. On 2 June 2024, in an interview with Sunday Scoop, he spoke about working with Bella Shmurda on "Gbera" and how great the experience was from recording to shooting the video.

== Artisty ==
Pryme describes his music style as Afrofusion and Afropop. He cited Chris Brown, R Kelly, and Beyonce, as his musical influence.

== Discography ==
=== EPs ===
List of studio extended plays, with selected details and chart positions
Title	Details	Peak chart positions
Title	Details	NG
Crescendo (EP)	Released: 25 June 2021; Formats: Digital download, streaming	—
Rhythm & Soul – EP	Released: 20 February 2020; Formats: Digital download, streaming	—

=== Singles ===
List of charted singles, with selected chart positions
Title	Year	Peak chart positions			Certifications	Album
Title	Year	NG	UK	US	Certifications	Album
"Trumpet"	2017	—	—	—		Non-album single
"Kilode" (feat. Davido & Peruzzi)	2018	—	—	—		Non-album single
"Surulere"	2019	—	—	—		Non-album single
"My Baby"	2019	—	—	—		Non-album single
"Good Loving"	2020	—	—	—		Non-album single
"Change"	2020	—	—	—		Non-album single
"Kolo"	2021	—	—	—		Crescendo (EP)
"Away"	2022	—	—	—		Non-album single
"Lavida"	2023	—	—	—		TBA
"Gbera" (feat. Bella Shmurda)	2024	—	—	—		TBA
"Carry Go"	2024	16	—	—		TBA
"Carry Go (remix)" (feat. Chike)	2024	—	—	—		TBA

=== Guest appearances ===
List of non-single guest appearances, with other performing artists, showing year released and album name
Title	Year	Other artist(s)	Album	Release date
"Show You Off" (featuring. Pryme	2023	Kizz Daniel	Maverick	

== Songwriting credits ==
Song title, original artist, album of release, and year of release
Song	Artist(s)	Writer(s)	Album	Year	Note(s)
"Let Me Know"	Iyanya	Iyanya Mbuk, Pyrme	The 6th Wave	2022	Songwriter
"Away"	Davido	David Adeleke, Kareem Temitayo, Pyrme, Roger Lino, Shugavybz	Timeless	2023	Songwriter
