= Timeless (Davido album) =

Studio album by Davido
- Released: 31 March 2023
- Genre: Amapiano; Afrobeats; dancehall; ragga; konto; highlife; Afropop
- Length: 49:12
- Label: DMW; Columbia; Sony
- Producer: Magicsticks; Ragee; Darmie; Blaisebeatz; 1da Banton; Caltonic SA; Young Alpha

Davido chronology
A Better Time (2020)	Timeless (2023)	5ive (2025)

Singles from Timeless
- 1. "Champion Sound" Released: 19 November 2021; 2. "Unavailable" Released: 11 April 2023

Timeless is the fourth studio album by Nigerian singer Davido. It was released on 31 March 2023, via Davido Music Worldwide, Columbia Records, and Sony Music Entertainment. Primarily an amapiano record, the album explores other musical styles such as Afrobeats, dancehall, ragga, konto, highlife, and Afropop. Timeless comprises 17 tracks and features collaborations with Skepta, Angelique Kidjo, Asake, Focalistic, and The Cavemen, among others. Its production was handled by Magicsticks, Ragee, Darmie, Blaisebeatz, 1da Banton, Caltonic SA, and Young Alpha, among others. The album was supported by the singles "Champion Sound" and "Unavailable". Timeless received generally positive reviews from music critics, who praised its production and considered it to be one of Davido's most accomplished albums yet. In July 2023, Davido embarked on the Timeless North American Tour to support the album.

Timeless was nominated for Best Global Music Album at the 66th Annual Grammy Awards.

== Background ==
In June 2022, Davido told Rolling Stone magazine that Timeless was nearly complete. In November, he took a break from social media to grieve the death of his three-year-old son. On 21 March 2023, he announced on Instagram that the album would be released on March 31. The announcement marked his return to social media. Prior to making the announcement, he briefly broke his social media hiatus when he performed at the 2022 FIFA World Cup final. On 29 March 2023, Davido revealed the album's track list and announced the signings of singers Morravey and Logos Olori to DMW.

Timeless marked Davido's first album in three years. He told CNN that the album's title, which record producer Don Jazzy suggested to him, is a manifestation of his goal for the album to be remembered as a classic for decades. He also told the news channel that the album went through three different phases before its final version. Comprising 17 tracks, the album features collaborations with Skepta, Angelique Kidjo, Asake, Focalistic, The Cavemen, Fave, Musa Keys, Dexta Daps, Morravey, and Logos Olori. Its production was handled by Magicsticks, Rage, Darmie, Blaisebeatz, 1da Banton, Caltonic SA, and Young Alpha, among others. The album's cover art features an image of Davido's head, two enclosed elephants, and a pathway that leads to a large hourglass. In an interview with Hot 97, Davido described the album as a "miracle album" and said he recorded 62 tracks for the project.

== Release and promotion ==
Davido released a theatrical trailer after announcing the album's release date on Instagram; the trailer is composed of tour footage. In it, he is seen writing out a note under his own narration. The trailer also features shots of him seated at an office desk, along with various performance and behind-the-scenes clips. Davido drew inspiration from the book of Ecclesiastes, saying, "There is a time for everything, a time to grieve and a time to heal, a time to laugh and a time to dance. A time to speak, and a time for silence". In anticipation of the album's arrival, Davido teamed up with Spotify to curate a playlist of Afrobeats tracks he considers timeless. Called the "Timeless Afro Playlist", it features tracks by artists such as Wizkid, Tekno and Mr Eazi.

Davido held three concerts in April 2023 to celebrate the album's release. The concerts were held at the Irving Plaza, Koko, and Tafawa Balewa Square, respectively. On April 4, Davido performed a medley of "Feel" and "Unavailable" on The Late Show with Stephen Colbert; he shared the stage with several drummers and The Compozers, a four-man vocal group. On 7 April, he discussed the creative process behind each song on the album while guest hosting Apple Music's Africa Now Radio. In support of the album, the radio station The Beat 99.9 FM launched an album campaign and temporarily changed its name to Timeless 99.9 FM.

On 24 April 2023, Davido announced the Timeless North American Tour to support the album. Scheduled to hold for two weeks, the tour commenced on 1 July, at the Capital One Arena in Washington, D.C., and concluded on 15 July, at the Budweiser Stage in Toronto, Canada. The tour was produced by Live Nation Urban and Duke Concept and included additional stops in Houston and Chicago. On 23 November 2023, Davido headlined the A.W.A.Y. Festival, which was postponed in the wake of his son's death. The Focalistic-assisted track "Champion Sound" was released on 19 November 2021, as the album's lead single. Considered an amapiano record, the song was jointly produced by Caltonic SA and Tee Jay. The music video for "Champion Sound" was filmed in London by Dalia Dias. Davido and Focalistic previously worked together on the remix of the latter's song "Ke Star".

The album's second single, "Unavailable", was released on 11 April 2023, along with its music video. The song features vocals by South African singer Musa Keys and was produced by Magicsticks. On the day of the album's release, Davido revealed a TikTok dance challenge, which has amassed over 600,000 posts. The accompanying music video for "Unavailable", which was directed by Dammy Twitch, features vivid images of huts, woodlands, and Davido's kind demeanor.

== Music and lyrics ==
Primarily an amapiano record, Timeless explores other musical styles such as Afrobeats, dancehall, ragga, konto, highlife, and Afropop. The album's opener "Over Dem" is a mid-tempo rhythmic track that features horns and a saxophone riff. Described as a "triumphant track", the song alludes to the Biblical tale of David and Goliath. The amapiano record "Feel" has been described as a "party-starter" and a "boisterous shaker" track. The romantic song "In the Garden" features guitar riffs and is supported by amapiano elements. The Native's Dennis Peter praised Morravey's voice on the track and likened her to Waje. In the introspective record "Godfather", Davido considers himself to be the head of the table. He also glorifies God and acknowledges the grace and blessings that have shaped him into the man he is. In "Unavailable", Davido talks about his stress-free life; the song has been described as a "tightly-controlled, message-filled, and highly danceable club tune". The dancehall track "Bop" features vocals by Jamaican singer Dexta Daps. Pulse Nigeria's Adeayo Adebiyi said the song is similar in flow pattern to A Good Time's "Risky".

In the Pon Pon track "E Pain Me", Davido addresses romantic betrayal and specifically talks about a girl who left him. Afrocritik writers Emmanuel Daraloye and Yinoluwa Olowofoyeku likened the song to Fireboy DML's "Afar" from Apollo (2020). In "Away", he considers himself to be the King of Gbedu; the song's production features pianos, amapiano shakers, and synths. In the ragga and konto track "Precision", Davido explores individuality as exemplified by lyrics like "I dey try sort myself, you for try sort yourself". The Damie-produced track "Kante" features an on off-beat chords, saxophone accents, and afro drums. Adebiyi praised Fave's vocals and artistry and said Davido's choice to name the song after a "famous footballer appeals across the board while possessing huge syncing potential". "Na Money", a highlife track that features vocals by Angélique Kidjo and The Caveman, is composed of rhythmic percussion and guitars. Daraloye and Olowofoyeku said the song "exemplifies the power of money on romantic interests and friends alike".

The Skepta-assisted track "U (Juju)", which is driven by Afroswing drums and chords, interpolates a line from Ice Prince's "Juju" single. The Asake-assisted track, "No Competition", is built on guitars, basses, and percussive drums. The slow burner track "Picasso" features vocals by Logos Olori and consists of off-kilter drums, jazzy keys, guitar chords, and sax accents. Musically, "For the Road" features a central bass synth, soft keys, strings, and piano accents; Adebiyi praised Davido for "delivering a konto rhthym that deploys timeless genre-appropriate vocabulary and technique". The penultimate track "LCND", an acronym for "Legends Can Never Die", was produced by Yung Willis. On the record, Davido bemoans the losses he has suffered personally and pleads for the freedom to live his life as he pleases. The closing track to Timeless, "Champion Sound", ends the project in a celebratory tone.

== Critical reception ==
Professional ratings
Review scores
Source	Rating
Afrocritik	8/10
Clash	8/10
Daily Post	7.5/10
Pulse Nigeria	7.6/10

Timeless received generally positive reviews from music critics. In a review for Clash magazine, Robin Murray assigned a rating of 8 out of 10, characterizing the album as an "ambitious yet extremely finessed record" and saying it is "easily one of Davido's most mature, rounded projects". Reviewing for Afrocritik, Emmanuel Daraloye and Yinoluwa Olowofoyeku also awarded the album 8 out of 10, praising its production, lyrics and Davido's voice. Moreover, they consider the album to be "one of the most accomplished releases of Davido's career" and said it "is a testament to the singer's growth and development as an artist". Ovwe Medeme of Premium Times newspaper thought the album was monotonous, but ended the review saying Davido chose to "focus on the lighter things of life".

Pulse Nigeria's Adeayo Adebiyi gave the album a rating of 7.6 out of 10, calling it "Davido's most musically accomplished album yet" and praising its production. Adebiyi also notes the record lacks "thematic depth and offers no singular sonic pattern". The Native critic Dennis Peter said Timeless is a "reassertion of Davido's greatness" and that its "driving force is invincibility". In a review for GRM Daily, Ore Bolarin commended Davido for "returning to form and displaying different feelings of longing, joy, and love". The Daily Post newspaper praised the album's sound engineering and percussion, but ended the review saying it "leaves some things to be desired". Teen Vogue's journalist Nelson C.J called the album "classic Davido" and said it is a "reminder of the singer's capacity to find and inspire unforgettable moments of joy in times of great unease".

In a review for the website Uproxx, Wongo Okon said the album's title "accurately describes Davido's music in today's afrobeats space" and commended the singer for "proving himself to be a limitless artist with enough strength to always find a way to finish at the top".

== Commercial performance ==
Timeless debuted at number 37 on the Billboard 200 chart, selling over 17,000 units in its first week. The album also debuted at number 10 on the UK Albums Chart, becoming the second Nigerian album to debut in the top 10 (after Burna Boy's Love, Damini). Tallying 14.5 million streams during the week of March 31 through April 6, the album surpassed Love, Damini to become the biggest debut for any album on Spotify Nigeria. Timeless broke the record for the biggest debut week on Apple Music Nigeria, and set a new record for the most streamed African album in a single day on Apple Music. The album received over 12 million streams in its first 24 hours on Audiomack, and had the biggest week ever recorded for any African album on the platform. Timeless broke the record for the biggest debut week ever recorded on Boomplay Nigeria; it amassed over 22 million streams four days after its release and surpassed the platform's previous record of 18.8 million streams held by Love, Damini.

== Track listing ==
Timeless track listing
No.	Title	Writer(s)	Producer(s)	Length
1.	"Over Dem"	David Adeleke; Jessy Oliver	Young Alpha	3:18
2.	"Feel"	Marcel Akunwata; Adeleke	Blaisebeatz	2:34
3.	"In the Garden" (featuring Morravey)	Adeleke; Daniella Daniel; Shorunke Abiodun	Rore	2:45
4.	"Godfather"	Adeleke; Prince Omoferi	Blaisebeatz	2:50
5.	"Unavailable" (featuring Musa Keys)	Adeleke; Olalekan Taiwo; Musa Makamu; Tobechukwu Okolie	Magicsticks	2:49
6.	"Bop" (featuring Dexta Daps)	Adeleke; Louis Grandison	Sparrq	2:41
7.	"E Pain Me"	Adeleke; Jon P	Jon P	3:03
8.	"Away"	Adeleke; Kareem Temitayo; Promise Nwabueze; Roger Lino; Godwin Ifeanyi	Magicsticks	2:33
9.	"Precision"	Adeleke; Udoma Amba	Shizzi	3:06
10.	"Kante" (featuring Fave)	Adeleke; Chidozie Ugochinyere	Damie	3:14
11.	"Na Money" (featuring The Cavemen and Angélique Kidjo)	Angélique Kidjo; Benjamin James; Adeleke; Godson Epelle; Kingsley Okorie	1da Banton	2:41
12.	"U (Juju)" (featuring Skepta)	Adeleke; Joseph Adenuga; Oliver	Young Alpha	3:13
13.	"No Competition" (featuring Asake)	Epelle; Ahmed Ololade; Adeleke; Olamide Adedeji	Rugged	2:36
14.	"Picasso" (featuring Logos Olori)	Adeleke; Taiwo	Rage	2:35
15.	"For the Road"	Adeleke; Omoferi	Blaisebeatz	2:27
16.	"LCND"	Daniel Williams; Adeleke; Elhi	Yung Willis	2:50
17.	"Champion Sound" (featuring Focalistic)	Adeleke; Deinde; Lethabo Sebetso	Caltonic SA; Tee Jay	3:57
Total length:				49:12

== Charts ==
Chart performance for Timeless
Chart (2023)	Peak position
Canadian Albums (Billboard)	32
Dutch Albums (Album Top 100)	76
Irish Albums (OCC)	40
Nigerian Albums (TurnTable)	1
UK Albums (OCC)	10
UK R&B Albums (OCC)	2
US Billboard 200	37
US World Albums (Billboard)	2

== Certifications ==
Certifications for Timeless
Region	Certification	Certified units/sales
United Kingdom (BPI)	Silver	60,000^{‡}
^{‡} Sales+streaming figures based on certification alone.

== Release history ==
Release history and formats for Timeless
Region	Date	Format	Label	Ref
Various	31 March 2023	Digital download; streaming	DMW; Columbia; Sony	
