= Iscom University Benin =

Private university

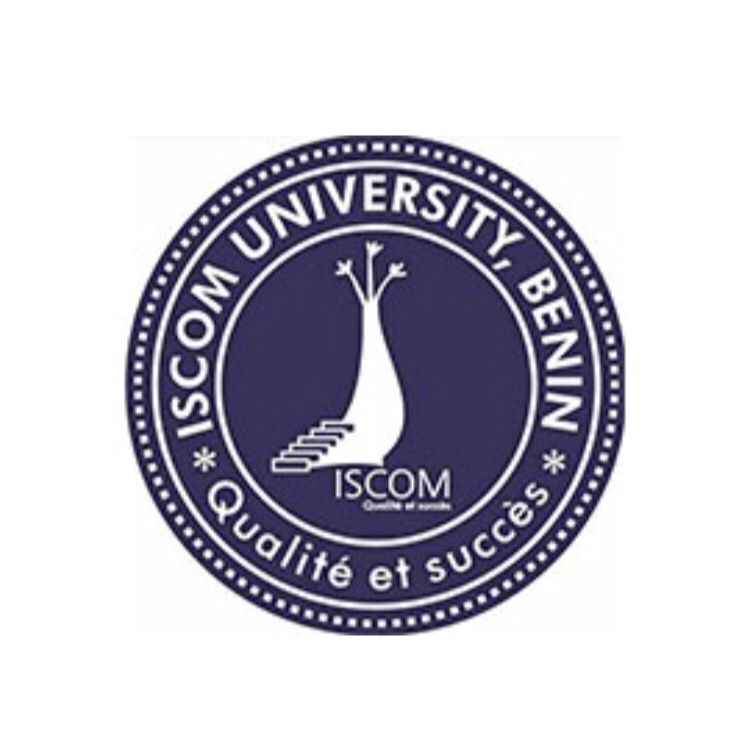
- Motto: Qualité et Succès (quality and success)
- Motto in English: Inspiring tomorrow's leaders
- Established: 2008
- Affiliations: Iscom Media School
- President: Prof. Tohi Bruno, President and Founder
- Location: Cotonou, Republic of Benin; 6.38053°N 2.45820°E
- Colors: Blue and Gold
- Website: www.iscomuniversitybn.com
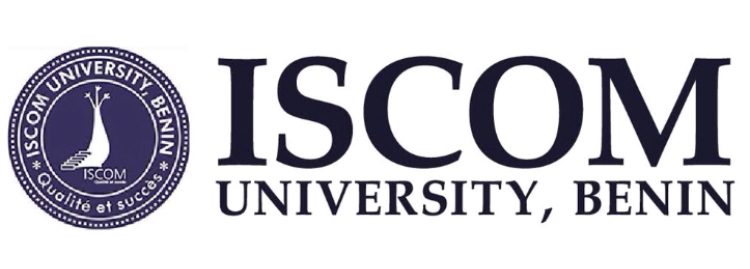

The Institut Superieur de Communication d’Organisation et de Management (Iscom University, Benin) is a private university in Cotonou, the largest city and economic capital of the Benin. Iscom University is one of the first institution in Benin to operate a functional online learning platform.

== History ==
Iscom was established in February 2005 at first, as a tutorial college for some foreign universities. Iscom opened as a tertiary education institution in July 2007, and was accredited to offer certificates, diplomas, undergraduate degrees and postgraduate programmes by the Ministry of Higher Education and Scientific Research (MHESR) in Republic of Benin.

In 2014, UNESCO signed a memorandum of understanding with Iscom University to provide tuition for Iscom students who achieved a 4.0 GPA and above as part of its tertiary education fund for Francophone countries.

In March 2018, the university partnered with the Aminu Kano International Foundation to award 50 scholarships to Nigerian students from Kano State to study at the university.

== Academics ==
=== Facts and Stats ===
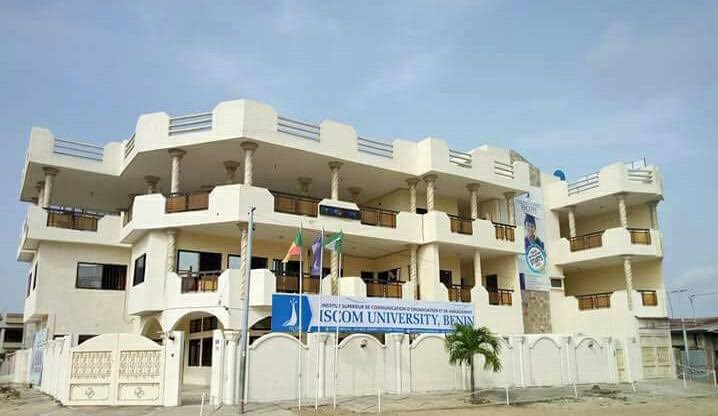
Iscom University Benin, circa 2015

Iscom University, Benin is a privately owned university located in Senade-Akpakpa, Cotonou, Benin Republic and it is ranked as one of the country's top 10 universities.

It is one of the nation's first-largest city universities and has over 10 faculties, 45 departments and 13 research laboratories. It is fully accredited by the Ministry of Higher Education and Scientific Research, Benin Republic and UNESCO and also recognised by Federal Ministry of Education, Nigeria.

Nigerian Graduates of ISCOM University are duly qualified to go for the one year mandatory National Youth Service Corps program (NYSC).
