= Paulash Panache =

Nigerian show promoter and record exec

- Born: Paul Femi Ashiru; 15 September 1991 (age 34); Lagos State-Nigeria
- Education: University of Lagos
- Occupations: Event promoter; musician; social media influencer; brand strategist
- Years active: 2016 - present
- Known for: Lituation Fridays

Paul Femi Ashiru also known as Paulash Panache, is a Nigerian popular show and club promoter, musician, social media influencer and brand strategist. He is known for his viral song titled No Girlfriend No Problem which was nominated for most popular Song of the Year, Best Collaboration of the Year and Street Song of the Year at the 2020 City People Entertainment Awards.

== Early life ==
Paul was born to the family of the Late Reverend Dr Samuel Femi Ashiru, he is a native of Ikenne, Ogun State.

== Education ==
Paul attended Temitope Nursery and Primary School in Somolu for his elementary education, Baptist Academy in Obanikoro for his secondary education, and the University of Lagos for Bachelor of Science degree in botany.

== Career ==
In 2019, he launched his popular weekly event dubbed “Lituation Fridays” at Club 57 Ikoyi.

In 2019, Paulash Panache won Music and Club Promoter of the Year 2019 at the City People Entertainment Awards for.

In 2020, his song titled No Girlfriend No Problem was nominated for most popular Song, Best Collaboration, Best Street Song of the Year and Music and Club Promoter of the Year at the City People Entertainment Awards.

On 4 December 2022, he was listed by the Nigerian national newspaper This Day as top show promoter alongside Paul O, and smade, among others

== Awards and nominations ==
| Year | Award | Category | Result | Ref |
|---|---|---|---|---|
| 2019 | City People Entertainment Awards | Music and Club Promoter | Won | |
| 2019 | Nigeria Hype Awards | Song of the Year | Won | |
| 2019 | Nigeria Hype Awards | Best Collaboration | Won | |
| 2019 | Nigeria Hype Awards | Entertainment Promoter | Won | |
| 2020 | City People Entertainment Awards | Most Popular Song | Nominated | |
| 2020 | City People Entertainment Awards | Best Collaboration | Nominated | |
| 2020 | City People Entertainment Awards | Best Street Song | Nominated | |
| 2020 | City People Entertainment Awards | Music and Club Promoter | Nominated | |
| 2021 | Naijatraffic Awards | Entertainment Promoter | Nominated | |
