= Aristokrat Records =

Record label in Nigeria

- Parent company: The Aristokrat Group
- Founded: 2010
- Founder: Piriye Isokrari
- Status: Active
- Distributors: Caroline France; Universal Music Publishing Group
- Genre: Various
- Country of origin: Nigeria
- Location: Lagos
- Services: Music recording; Distribution; Merchandising; Audiovisual content; Music Publishing; Branding; Management
- Owners: 960 Music Group (40%); The Aristokrat Group (60%)
- Divisions: Aristokrat 360; Aristokrat Publishing; Aristokrat Lifestyle

Aristokrat Records is a Nigerian record label owned by The Aristokrat Group. The label operates as a subsidiary of The Aristokrat Group, an African Media & Entertainment company. It units includes; Aristokrat 360, Aristokrat Publishing, and Aristokrat Lifestyle. On 11 May 2020, Universal Music France announced its partnership with Aristokrat Records, under the watch of The Aristokrat Group, as the label will now distribute under its label services Caroline France, and publish under Universal Music Publishing Group. As the joint partnership will also help discover and develop exciting new African talent, giving artistes and songwriters the opportunity to reach global audiences with support from Universal Music Group of companies around the world; says Piriye in an interview with This Day.

It services includes, music recording, distribution, merchandising, audiovisual content, music publishing, branding, and management.

The label is home to recording acts, such as Jujuboy Star, T’neeya, and Ria Sean. It also houses producer Saszy Afroshii; a disc jockey DJ Bally, who also signed a management deal with Aristokrat 360 in 2018. Artists formerly signed to the label, include Burna Boy, LeriQ, Kamar, Mojeed, Ozone, Pucado, Kel-P and DJ Consequence, who served as the first official disc jockey signed to the label. Ariyike Owolagba was their erstwhile director of operations.

The label is currently headed by Enei Apulu Isokrari as CEO and Joseph Dike Abiagom as President/ Label manager

== History ==
Aristokrat was founded by Piriye Isokrari, in Norman, Oklahoma, while in college before relocation in 2009 to Port Harcourt.

Aristokrat Records was founded in 2010 for music recording, distribution, and music publishing. It operates as a part of 960 Music Group, a Nigerian music and entertainment company, is known for acquiring forty percent stake in Aristokrat Records. Piriye Isokrari, signed Afrobeats artist, Burna Boy in 2012, with alternative Afrobeat record producer LeriQ. In 2014, 960 Music Group, investment $1 million in its Series A round, to help develop four new artists (Kamar, Mojeed, Ozone, and Pucado) signed. In 2015, he signed DJ Consequence, and T’neeya, joined in 2018, with a worldwide deal. On 13 November 2020, the label unveiled the signing of Jujuboy Star to Aristokrat Records, with a distribution deal with Caroline France. On 6 June 2021, the label unveiled Ria Sean.

== Aristokrat Group ==
The Aristokrat Group
- Former logo of Aristokrat Group
- Type: Private
- Industry: Media; Entertainment
- Founded: 2006
- Founder: Piriye Isokrari
- Headquarters: Port Harcourt, Nigeria
- Area served: Worldwide
- Key people: Piriye Isokrari (CEO/Founder)
- Products: Music, Media, and Entertainment
- Owners: Piriye Isokrari
- Subsidiaries: Aristokrat Records; Aristokrat Publishing; Aristokrat 360
- Website: https://www.aristokratgroup.com/

The Aristokrat Group (commonly known as Aristokrat or Aristokrat Group), headquartered in Port Harcourt, is an African Media and Entertainment company, best known its record label. It also has a publishing company, digital media company, tour and concert production company and a creative consulting and solutions agency. The company is headed by its Founder, Piriye Isokrari.

Its music, and entertainment units includes, Aristokrat Records, Aristokrat 360, Aristokrat Publishing, and Aristokrat Lifestyle. In 2013, Rio Africa acquired 40% of Aristokrat; in turn, Rio Africa tapped Isokrari to head A&R and operations of 960 Music Group. In 2014, he received $1 million investment from 960 Music Group, to develop four new artists (Kamar, Mojeed, Ozone, and Pucado).

In 2020, Billboard named Aristokrat Group as one of The Gatekeepers of the Nigerian music industry.

=== Partnerships ===
==== Universal Music France ====
In May 2020, UMF, announced an exclusive strategic deal with Aristokrat Group. In addition, the jointed partnership with Universal Music Group, includes Aristokrat Records artists, with a label deal with Universal Music France and a publishing deal with Universal Music Publishing, to help launch them into the global market, through Caroline France.

==== Turntable Charts ====
In May 2021, Turntable Charts announced its partnership with Aristokrat Group. As the partnership will allow both companies collaborate in the exchange of data and ideas to improve music consumption, documentation, and chart culture in Nigeria. Speaking with Pulse Nigeria, CEO of TurnTable Charts, Adeayo Adebiyi, says "everybody at TurnTable Charts is delighted to announce that Aristokrat Group is endorsing TurnTable Top 50 Nigeria as the foremost and a standard music chart publication in Nigeria."

==== Boomplay ====
On 17 March 2021, Boomplay says its partnership with UMG’s African labels, will also be supported under the new agreement, and other distributed labels, including Aristokrat.

== Artistokrat divisions ==
=== Aristokrat 360 ===
The Aristokrat Group founded Aristokrat 360, under Aristokrat Records in 2018, as a division for artist management for Aristokrat. In June 2018, DJ Bally signed a management deal with Aristokrat 360. In 2020, Seyi Shay, Saszy Afroshii, TMXO, and DJ Obi, signed a management deal with Aristokrat 360.

=== Aristokrat Publishing ===
The Aristokrat Group, and Universal Music Publishing France founded Aristokrat Publishing, under Aristokrat Records via Universal Music France in 2020, as its division for music publishing in Africa. Same year, Saszy Afroshii signed a publishing deal with Aristokrat Publishing, and Seyi Shay joined her in 2021 via Universal Music Publishing Group.

=== Aristokrat Lifestyle ===
The Aristokrat Group, founded Aristokrat Lifestyle, under Aristokrat Records in 2019, as its division for label branding, and merchandising.

== Artists ==
=== Management ===
Act	Year signed
DJ Bally	2018
Seyi Shay	2020
Saszy Afroshii	2020
TMXO	2020
DJ Obi	2020

=== Current acts ===
Act	Year signed	Releases under the label
T’neeya	2018	—
Jujuboy Star	2020	—
Saszy Afroshii	2020	—
Ria Sean	2021	—

=== Former acts ===
Act	Year signed	Year left	Releases under the label
Burna Boy	2012	2014	3
Kamar	2014		1
Mojeed	2014		1
Ozone	2014		1
Pucado	2014		1

Burna Boy's departure surfaced after his two years deal with Aristokrat expired in 2014, during his stay with the label, he released and promoted, various projects, and singles including "Like To Party", which was his breakthrough single, and the lead single from his debut studio album L.I.F.E in 2013, exclusively produced by LeriQ, and Piriye Isokrari.

== Producers ==
=== Current producers ===
- Saszy Afroshii

=== Former producer ===
- LeriQ
- Kel-P

== Discography ==
=== Albums/mixtapes/EPs ===
Artist	Album	Details
Burna Boy	L.I.F.E	Released: August 12, 2013; Chart Position: 7; Certification: —
Burna Boy	Burn Identity	Released: November 11, 2011; Chart Position: —; Certification: —
Burna Boy	Burn Notice	Released: April 25, 2011; Chart Position: —; Certification: —
Pucado	Pukie The Great E.P.	Released: April 15, 2014; Chart Position: —; Certification: —
Kamar	The Audition E.P.	Released: June 5, 2014; Chart Position: —; Certification: —
Ozone	Superiority Complex	Released: July 29, 2014; Chart Position: —; Certification: —
LeriQ	The Lost Sounds	Released: August 28, 2015; Chart Position: —; Certification: —
