= Kel-P =

Nigerian record producer

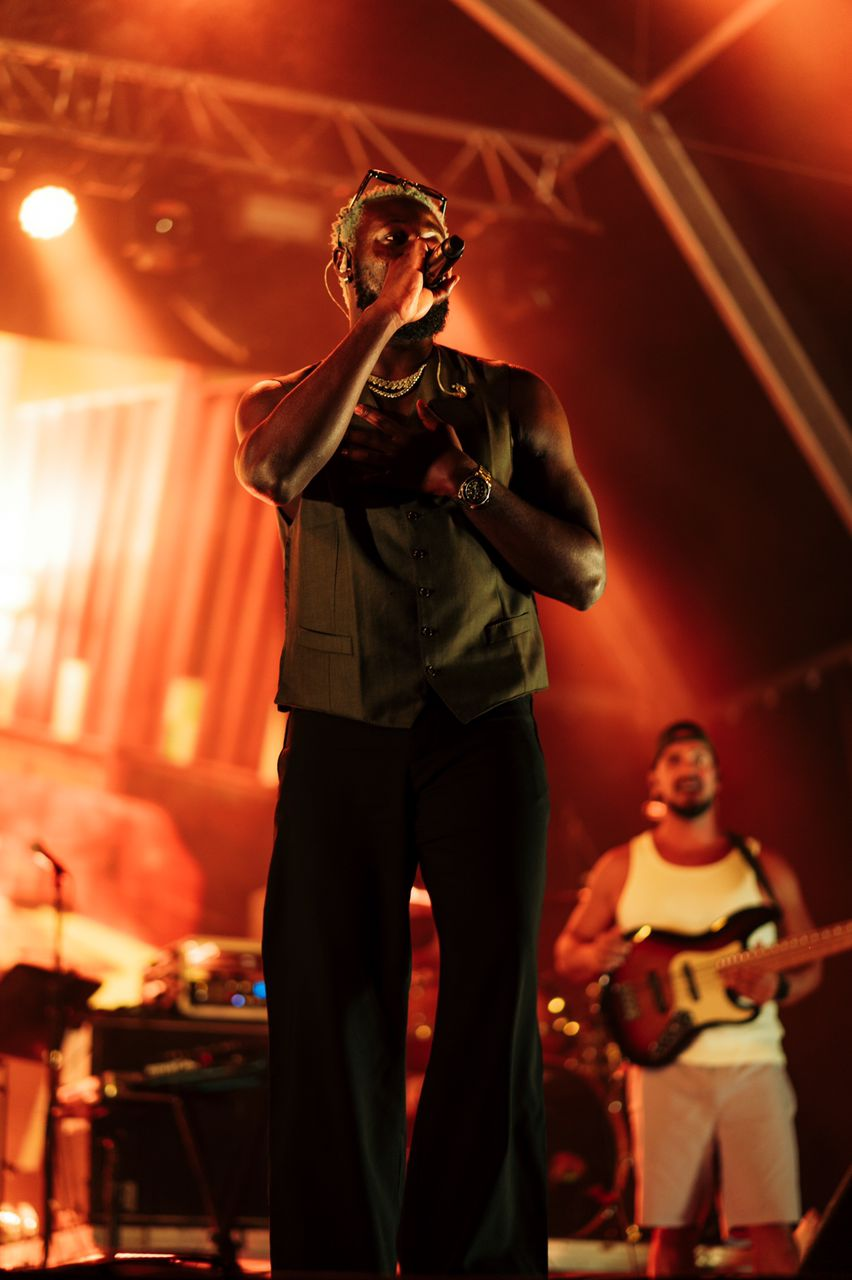

Background information
- Born: Udoma Peter Kelvin Amba; Lagos, Nigeria
- Origin: Nigerian
- Genres: Afro-Fusion, Afrobeat, Afro pop, Dancehall, Amapiano
- Occupations: Record producer, songwriter
- Years active: 2017–present
- Labels: Bully Entertainment; Universal Music France; Jones Worldwide; Virgin Music France; Universal Music Publishing France
- Website: itskelpvibes.com

Udoma Peter Kelvin Amba known professionally as Kel-P is a Nigerian record producer, singer and songwriter. He is the founder and the CEO of Bully Entertainment, and is currently signed to Universal Music Publishing France, Universal Music France, and Virgin Music France, with a management deal with Jones Worldwide. He was formerly signed to Aristokrat from 2019 to 2023, and is best known for exclusively producing and co-writing the Grammy nominated world album African Giant in 2019.

He was credited by OkayAfrica, as one of the key figures who have helped take Afrobeats to new heights. In 2021, he co-produced the Grammy winning Best Global Album Mother Nature by Angélique Kidjo, and Grammy nominated album Made in Lagos (Deluxe version) by Wizkid. In 2023, he co-produced the Grammy-nominated album The Age of Pleasure by Janelle Monáe, and co-wrote the Grammy-nominated Best Global Album Timeless by Davido, which earned him, a special recognition from The Recording Academy.

== Early life ==
Udoma Peter Kelvin Amba was born and raised in Lagos State to parents from Akwa Ibom State.

== Career ==
In 2016, he met with Sarz, which led to Sarz, helping in creating the song he was working on at that point in time. Sarz, also helped him in creating his tag "It's Kel-P Vibes". In 2018, he rose to prominent, following his production on Solid Star's single "Eleganza". He has worked with several artistes including Burna Boy, Rema, Niniola, Diamond Platnumz, and Wizkid. With major hits, "Dangote" by Burna Boy, "Peace of Mind" by Rema, "Jeje" by Diamond Platnumz, "Boda Sodiq" & "Fantasy" by Niniola, and "Ghetto Love" by Wizkid.

In 2020, following the partnership between Universal Music Group subsidiary Universal Music France and The Aristokrat Group, the parent company of Aristokrat Records, Kel-P was signed to Universal Music France with a distribution deal with Caroline France. On 24 November 2020, he was nominated at the 63rd Grammy Awards, via Skip Marley album Higher Place, on the song "Faith". On 23 November 2021, he was nominated at the 64th Grammy Awards, via Wizkid album Made in Lagos (Deluxe version), and won his first Grammy award in the same category "Best Global Music Album" for Angélique Kidjo sixteen studio album Mother Nature. On 20 January 2023, he launched his singing career with the release of "One More Night", through Jones Worldwide, and Virgin Music France division, with its accompanying music video directed by Damian Belden, and Luke Shaw.

On 3 November 2023, Universal Music Publishing Group, division in France renews Kel-P's global publishing deal through Universal Music Publishing France. The music publishing contract was renewed to distribute and market, Kel-P's upcoming extended play Bully Season Vol.2. During the renewal, Kel-P unveiled his recording company, Bully Entertainment, as a joint venture partnership between Kel-P and Shay Jones's Jones Worldwide owning 40% of the company. He also seats as CEO of Bully Entertainment, upon its launching.

== Production discography ==
=== Selected albums produced and songwriting credit ===
Artist	Album	Release date	Certifications	Label	Note
Burna Boy	African Giant	26 July 2019	MC: Gold; NVPI: Gold; IFPI: Gold; BPI : Gold; SNEP : Gold	Spaceship / Atlantic / WMG	Primary producer; Co-writer
Phyno	Deal with It	4 September 2019		Penthauze	Produced 2 songs
Ashidapo	4am in Lagos	13 September 2019		Aristokrat 360 Limited	Co-produced
Dadju	Poison ou Antidote	15 November 2019	SNEP:Diamond	UMG / Polydor Records	Produced 2 songs
Starboy	Soundman Vol. 1	6 December 2019		Starboy Entertainment	Produced 3 songs
Wurld	AFROSOUL	15 May 2020		We Are Gvds / Immensum Music	Produced 1 song
Skip Marley	Higher Place	28 August 2020		Island Records	Co-produced
Niniola	Colours and Sounds	2 October 2020		Drumroll Records	Produced 3 songs
Wizkid	Made in Lagos	30 October 2020	MC: Gold; NVPI: Gold; IFPI: Gold; BPI : Gold; RIAA : Gold	Starboy / RCA	Produced 1 song
Angélique Kidjo	Mother Nature	18 June 2021		Decca Records	Co-produced
Seyi Shay	Big Girl	10 December 2021		Stargurl Limited / Jones Worldwide	Co-executive producer
Kel-P	Bully Season Vol.1	24 February 2023		Jones Worldwide / Virgin Music France / Universal Music France	Executive producer
Dreamville	Creed III	3 March 2023		Sony Classical Records	Produced 2 songs
Rema	Rave & Roses	25 March 2022	MC: Platinum; SNEP: Gold; ZPAV: Gold; IFPI: Platinum	Jonzing World / Mavin Records	Produced 1 song
Davido	Timeless	21 March 2023		Davido Music Worldwide / Sony Music / Columbia Records	Co-wrote 1 song
Janelle Monáe	The Age of Pleasure	9 June 2023		Wondaland / Bad Boy Records / Atlantic Records	Co-produced 1 song

== Accolades ==
Year	Awards ceremony	Award description(s)	Results
2019	The Headies	Producer of the Year ""Killin Dem" by (Burna Boy)"	Nominated
2019	City People Music Award	Music Producer of the Year	Nominated
2019	Soundcity MVP Awards Festival	African Producer of the Year	Nominated
2019	Grammy Awards	Best World Music Album "African Giant" by (Burna Boy)"	Nominated
2019	African Muzik Magazine Awards	Music Producer of The Year	Won
2019	The Beatz Awards	Afro Dancehall Producer of the Year	Won
2019	The Beatz Awards	Producer of the Year	Won
2019	The Beatz Awards	Afro Beat Producer of the Year	Won
2019	All Africa Music Awards	Producer of the Year in Africa	Won
2020	The Headies	Producer of the Year ""Pull Up" by (Burna Boy)"	Nominated
2020	Grammy Awards	Best Reggae Album "Higher Place" by (Skip Marley)	Nominated
2022	Grammy Awards	Best Global Music Album "Made In Lagos: Deluxe Edition" by (Wizkid)	Nominated
2022	Grammy Awards	Best Global Music Album "Mother Nature" by (Angélique Kidjo)	Won
2023	The Headies	Producer of the Year "Kpe Paso" by (Wande Coal)	Nominated
2024	Grammy Awards	Album of the Year "The Age of Pleasure" by (Janelle Monáe)	Nominated
2024	Grammy Awards	Best Global Music Album "Timeless" by (Davido)	Nominated
