= DJ Switch (Nigerian DJ) =

Nigerian disc jockey

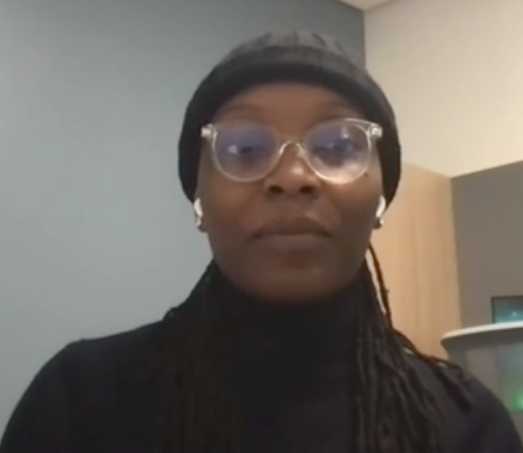
- In a USIP online discussion in 2021
- Born: Obianuju Catherine Udeh; 1983 or 1984 (age 41–42)
- Education: University of Port Harcourt
- Occupations: Disc jockey, songwriter, musician

Obianuju Catherine Udeh (born 1983 or 1984), professionally known as DJ Switch, is a Nigerian disc jockey who emerged as the winner of the first edition of The Glo X Factor in 2013 at the age of 29. She is the last of eight children, from Udi in Enugu State, a Geology graduate from University of Port Harcourt, Rivers State and now a professional disc jockey.

== Early life and education ==
DJ Switch was born to Nigerian parents and grew up in Warri, a city in South-South Nigeria, Delta state. Her father died, and she’s the last of eight children.

DJ Switch is a Geology graduate from the University of Port Harcourt Rivers state in Nigeria.

== Career ==
DJ Switch started her entertainment career as a disc jockey and moved on to becoming a song writer, as well as a musician. She first earned attention when her group, Da Pulse, emerged as the winner of the 2009 edition of reality music competition Star Quest. They further went on to release a hit song titled "So Tey", which featured American rapper Busta Rhymes in the remix.

Her career fully kicked off after she emerged the winner of the maiden and only edition of the Glo X-Factor in 2013. She was signed into a record deal with Sony Music as part of the prizes for the emergence, as the winner of the Glo X-Factor been endorsed by Peter Okoye's P-Classic Records.

On 20 October 2020, DJ switch live streamed the aftermath of the Lekki Massacre. In the video, they attempted to remove a bullet from the leg of a man who was shot, tying a Nigerian flag around his leg.

== Award ==
DJ Switch won Nigeria's Glo X-Factor in 2013.
