= Wande Coal =

Nigerian musician

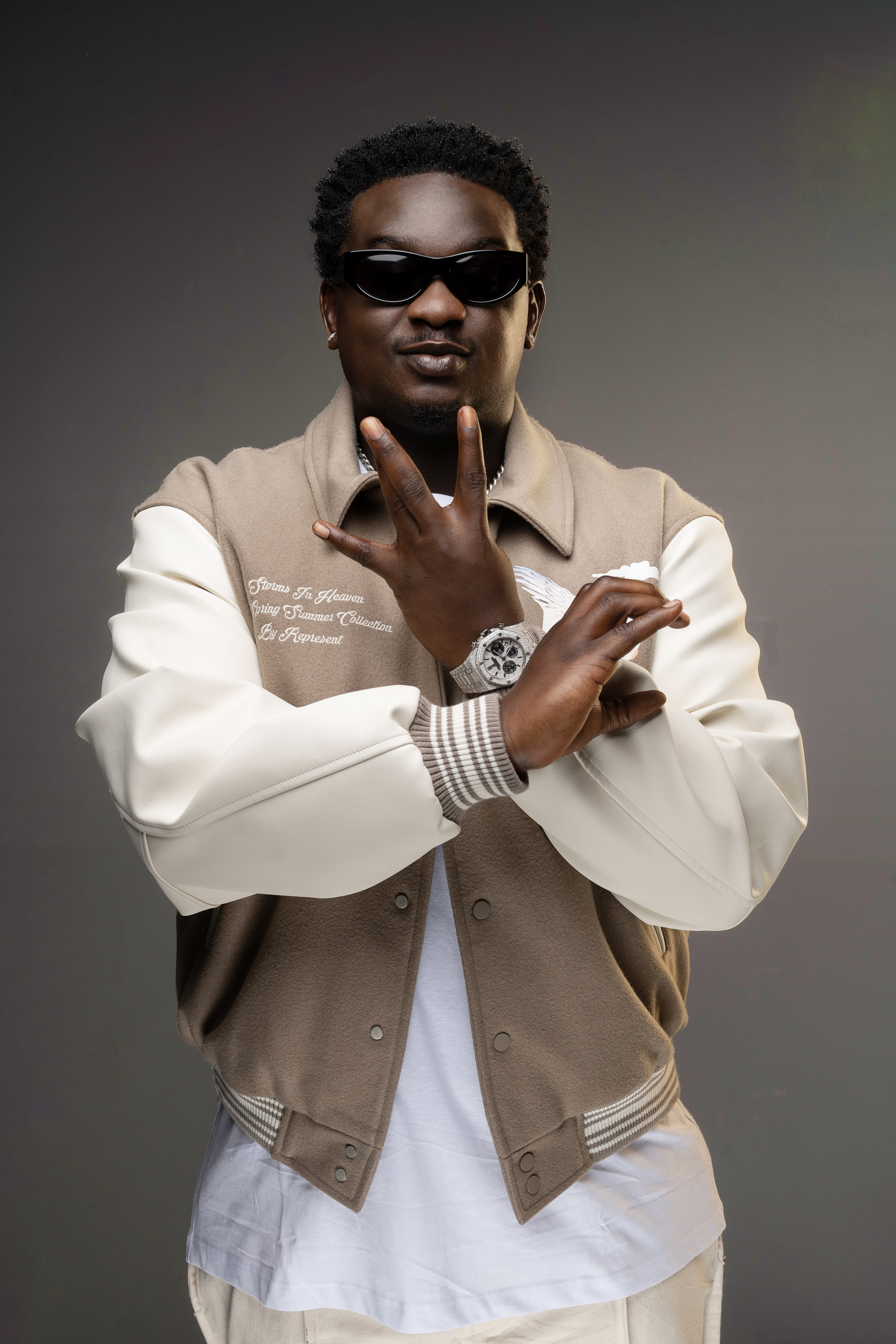
- Wande Coal

Background information
- Also known as: Wande Coal
- Born: Oluwatobi Wande Ojosipe; 18 October 1985 (age 40); Lagos Island, Lagos State, Nigeria
- Origin: Nigeria
- Genres: AfroPop; Afrobeats; R&B
- Occupations: Singer; songwriter
- Years active: 2006–present
- Labels: Black Diamond; Empire (current); Mavin (former); Mo' Hits (former)
- Website: official website

Oluwatobi Wande Ojosipe (born 18 October 1985), popularly known as Wande Coal, is a Nigerian singer and songwriter.

== Early life ==
Wande Coal was born on 18 October 1985 in Lagos Island, Lagos state, Nigeria, to Chief Ibukun Olufunto and Omolara Oluwayemisi Ojosipe. He is the first of two children.

== Education ==
Wande Coal began his primary school education at Staff Nursery and Primary School Ijanikin, Lagos State, and later attended Federal Government College ijanikin Lagos in Lagos State, for his secondary school education. He then proceeded to The University of Lagos (Unilag), Lagos State, where he studied Human Kinetics.

== Career ==
Wande Coal started singing in the teenage choir at his church. He later worked as a dancer and was introduced to Mo' Hits Records in 2006 after performing at a campus event at the University of Lagos (UNILAG) attended by D'banj and Don Jazzy, who contacted him the next day and signed him to the label. He initially served as a backup singer for D'banj, providing vocals on songs such as "Loke" and "Tono Sibe", and later performed with the label’s live band. Coal appeared on most tracks on Mo' Hits' compilation album Curriculum Vitae (2007), after which work began on his debut studio album Mushin 2 Mo' Hits (2009).

Wande Coal's "You Bad" single won the award for Best Pop Single at the 2010 edition of Hip Hop World Awards, which was also nominated for Song of the Year. His debut album also won the award for Best R&B/Pop Album and Album of the Year. Receiving a nomination for Best Vocal Performance (Male) for his song "Bananas" at the event, he won the awards for Artiste of the Year and Revelation of the Year. He won the African Artiste of the Year category at the Ghana Music Awards in 2010.

=== 2012–2015 ===
Coal has also recorded tracks with other Nigerian artists, including Ikechukwu, Phyno, Davido, Naeto C, Dr SID, D'Prince, Wizkid and many other artists. In 2012, following a fallout between record label executives Don Jazzy and D'banj, Coal, Dr SID and D'Prince signed on to Don Jazzy's new Record Label Mavin Records with the addition of Tiwa Savage from 323 Entertainment acting as the first lady of Mavin Records. Reports of Wande Coal’s exit from Mavin Records surfaced in 2013 after he released and promoted the single "Kilaju" without the label’s support. On 5 November 2013, he released another single, "Baby Face", which he said was produced by Shizzi. Shortly after, Don Jazzy accused Wande Coal of intellectual property theft on Twitter and uploaded a studio demo of the song that he said had been recorded the previous year. Wande Coal denied the allegations and shared what he described as the original studio version of the song on social media. In the same report, entertainment lawyer Demilade Olaosun stated that ownership of the song could not be determined publicly because Wande Coal’s recording contract was not available. Mavin Records formally announced Wande Coal's departure in a press release dated 7 November 2013, issued shortly after the public exchange between both parties. In 2013, he launched his music label Black Diamond Entertainment.

=== 2017–2022 ===
After a long hiatus, Wande Coal dropped his second album Wanted. Most reviews of the album placed him on a slightly above-average scale. Coal released a single Tur-Key Nla in December 2017. He kicked off his 2020 with a single track titled "Again", produced by Melvitto. An unnamed writer for Vanguard said the song proved Wande Coal still had strong vocals, calling it "a validation of [Coal's] musical prowess," and added that it brought back the feel of his early work while noting it "might not be as great as his single 'Ololufe'." He just released another Single in 2021 titled "Come My Way". In 2022, he was featured on the rapper, Olamide‘s single, Hate Me, which was released in February 2022. He also re-released his album "Mushin2Mohits".

== Discography ==
Studio albums

- Mushin 2 Mo' Hits (2009)
- Wanted (2015)
- Legend or No Legend (2023)
- King Coal (2026)

EPs

- Realms (2020)
- Best Of Both Worlds (with Kel-P) (2025)

=== Singles ===
==== As lead artist ====
List of singles as lead artist, showing year released and album name
Title	Year	Album	Ref
"Ololufe"	2008	Mushin 2 Mo' Hits	
"Bumper 2 Bumper"	2008	Mushin 2 Mo' Hits	
"Go Low"	2011	Non-album singles	
"Been Long You Saw Me"	2011	Non-album singles	
"Private Trips"	2011	Non-album singles	
"Constantly"	2012	Non-album singles	
"The Kick" (featuring Don Jazzy)	2013	Non-album singles	
"My Way"	2013	Wanted	
"Rotate"	2013	Non-album singles	
"Baby Face"	2013	Non-album singles	
"Amorawa"	2013	Wanted	
"Baby Hello"	2014	Wanted	
"Aye Dun" (featuring Skuki)	2014	Wanted	
"Ashimapeyin"	2015	Wanted	
"Same Shit" (featuring AKA)	2015	Wanted	
"Ballerz"	2016	Non-album single	
"Iskaba" (with DJ Tunez)	2016	Non-album single	
"Oh No No"	2017	Non-album single	
"Tur-Key Nla"	2017	Non-album single	
"Will You Be Mine?" (with LeriQ)	2018	Non-album single	
"So Mi So"	2018	Non-album single	
"Tupac" (with P Montana)	2018	Non-album single	
"Vex" (featuring Sarz)	2019	Realms	
"Ode Lo Like"	2019	Realms	
"Again"	2020	Realms	
"Naughty Girl"	2020	Realms	
"Come My Way"	2021	Legend or No Legend	
"Umbrella"	2022	Where We Come From, Vol. 01	
"Kpe Paso" (with Olamide)	2023	Legend or No Legend	
"Let Them Know"	2023	Legend or No Legend	
"Ebelebe" (featuring Wizkid)	2023	Legend or No Legend	

== Awards and nominations ==
- African Artiste of the Year – Ghana Music Awards 2010
- Artiste of the Year – 2010 Hip Hop World Awards
- Best R&b/Pop Single – 2010 Hip Hop World Awards
- Album of the Year at the Hip Hop World Awards – 2010
- Song of the Year at the Hip Hop World Awards – 2010
- Hip Hop Revelation of the Year at the Hip Hop World Awards – 2010
- Song of the Year at MTV Africa Music Award - 2016
- Best Collaboration at Nigeria Entertainment Award - 2017
