= Kizz Daniel discography =

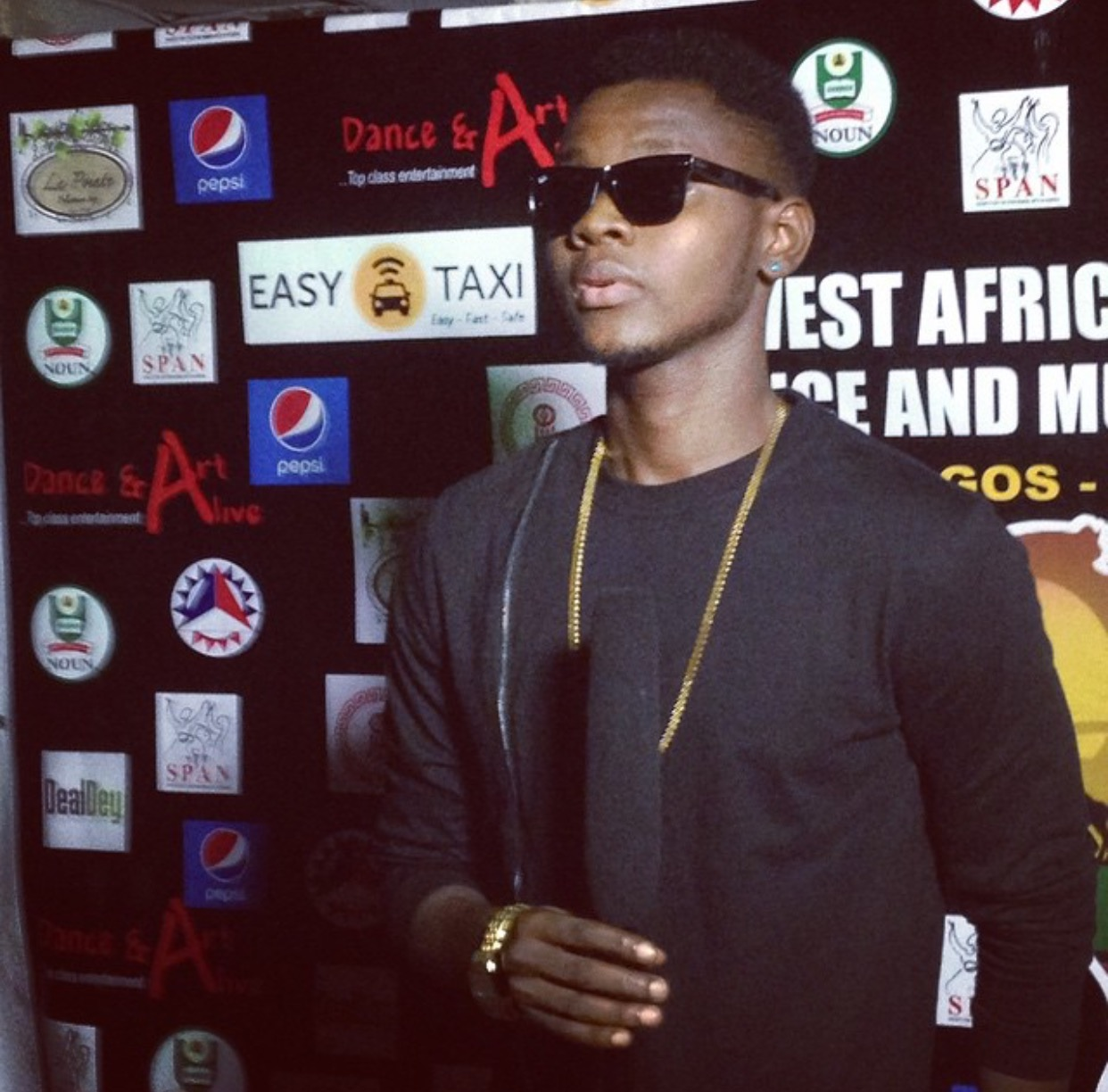
- Kizz Daniel at an event in 2015
- Studio albums: 4
- EPs: 3
- Singles: 68
- Music videos: 38
- Guest appearances: 11

The discography of Nigerian singer and songwriter Kizz Daniel consists of four studio albums, three extended plays, sixty-eight singles (including thirty-one as featured artist), thirty-eight music videos (twenty-eight as featured artist), and eleven guest appearances. He began his recording career in 2013 after signing with G-Worldwide Entertainment and rose to prominence with his 2014 breakout single "Woju", which spawned a remix with Davido and Tiwa Savage. In 2016, he released his debut studio album, New Era, which debuted at number eight on the Billboard World Albums chart and won Album of the Year at The Headies 2016. Following his exit from G-Worldwide in 2017 and the launch of his imprint Flyboy I.N.C., he released his second studio album, No Bad Songz in November 2018. His third studio album, King of Love, was released on 25 June 2020 by Flyboy I.N.C. In 2021, Kizz Daniel released his debut extended play, Barnabas, followed by his fourth studio album, Maverick in 2023. He released the EPs TZA and Uncle K: Lemon Chase in 2024 and 2025 respectively.

== Studio albums ==
Title	Album details	Peak chart positions	
Title	Album details	NGR	US World
New Era	Released: 14 May 2016; Label: G-Worldwide; Formats: CD, digital download	×	8
No Bad Songz	Released: 30 November 2018; Label: Flyboy; Formats: CD, streaming, digital download	×	—
King of Love	Released: 25 June 2020; Label: Flyboy; Formats: Streaming, digital download	×	—
Maverick	Released: 28 July 2023; Label: Flyboy, Empire; Formats: Streaming, digital download	2	—
"—" denotes a release that did not chart or was not released in that territory. "×" denotes that the chart did not exist at the time.

== Extended plays ==
Title	Album details	Peak chart positions	
Title	Album details	NGR	US World
Barnabas	Released: 19 November 2021; Label: Flyboy, Empire; Formats: Streaming, digital download	16	—
TZA	Released: 11 March 2024; Label: Flyboy, Empire; Formats: Streaming, digital download	1	—
Uncle K: Lemon Chase	Released: 29 May 2025; Label: Flyboy, Empire; Formats: Streaming, digital download	1	20
"—" denotes a release that did not chart or was not released in that territory.

== Singles ==
=== As lead artist ===
List of singles as lead artist, with selected chart positions
Title	Year	Peak chart positions					Certifications	Album
Title	Year	NGR	UK Afro.	US Afro.	US World	Excl. US	Certifications	Album
"Shoye"	2014	×	×	×	×	—		Non-album singles
"Chidioke"	2014	×	×	×	×	—		Non-album singles
"Woju" (solo or remix featuring Tiwa Savage and Davido)	2014	×	×	×	×	—		New Era
"Laye"	2015	×	×	×	×	—		New Era
"Molue" (with Sugarboy)	2015	×	×	×	×	—		Non-album single
"Good Time" (solo or remix featuring Wizkid)	2015	×	×	×	×	—		New Era
"Mama"	2016	×	×	×	×	—		New Era
"Sofa"	2017	×	×	×	×	—		Non-album single
"Yeba"	2017	×	×	×	×	—		Non-album single
"No Do"	2017	×	×	×	×	—		No Bad Songz
"4Dayz"	2018	×	×	×	×	—		Non-album single
"For You" (featuring Wizkid)	2018	×	×	×	×	—		Non-album single
"One Ticket" (featuring Davido)	2018	×	×	×	9	—		No Bad Songz
"Madu"	2019	×	×	×	×	—		No Bad Songz
"Poko"	2019	×	×	×	×	—		No Bad Songz
"Fvck You"	2019	×	×	×	×	—		King of Love
"Eko"	2019	×	×	×	×	—		Non-album single
"Pak 'n' Go"	2019	×	×	×	×	—		King of Love
"Pah Poh"	2019	×	×	×	×	—		Non-album single
"Jaho"	2019	×	×	×	×	—		King of Love
"Currently" (featuring Olamide, Falz and LK Kuddy)	2021	—	—	×	—	—		Non-album single
"Flex"	2021	—	—	×	—	—		Maverick
"Lie"	2021	1	10	×	—	—	TCSN: 3× Platinum	Barnabas
"Buga" (featuring Tekno)	2022	1	20	—	—	—	TCSN: 4× Platinum	Maverick
"Cough (Odo)" (solo or remix featuring Becky G)	2022	1	4	8	138	—	TCSN: 3× Platinum	Maverick
"RTID (Rich Till I Die)"	2023	2	12	29	—	—	TCSN: Platinum	Maverick
"Shu-Peru"	2023	2	13	—	—	—		Maverick
"My G"	2023	11	15	—	—	—		Maverick
"Too Busy to Be Bae"	2023	8	16	21	—	—		TZA
"Twe Twe" (solo or remix featuring Davido)	2023	1	1	9	—	—	TCSN: 4× Platinum	TZA
"Double"	2024	2	10	20	—	—		Non-album singles
"Marhaba"	2024	1	6	15	—	—		Non-album singles
"We Must" (featuring Thyself)	2024	11	—	—	—	—		Non-album singles
"Pano Tona" (with Adekunle Gold)	2024	5	14	—	—	—		Non-album singles
"Police" (featuring Angélique Kidjo and Johnny Drille)	2025	12	13	16	—	—		Uncle K: Lemon Chase
"To Be a Man"	2025	19	16	18	—	—		Non-album singles
"Holy Romance"	2025	68	—	38	—	—		Non-album singles
"—" denotes a recording that did not chart or was not released in that territory. "×" denotes that the chart did not exist at the time.

=== As featured artist ===
List of singles as featured artist, with selected chart positions
Title	Year	Peak chart positions			Certifications	Album
Title	Year	NGR	UK Afro.	US Afro.	Certifications	Album
"Raba" (DJ Shabsy featuring Kiss Daniel and Sugarboy)	2015	×	×	×		Non-album single
"Kilamity" (Sugarboy featuring Kiss Daniel)	2017	×	×	×		Believe
"Gbayi" (CDQ featuring Kiss Daniel)	2018	×	×	×		Ibile Mugabe
"Me Ke" (Omawumi featuring Kiss Daniel)	2018	×	×	×		Non-album single
"Baba" (DJ Spinall featuring Kiss Daniel)	2018	×	×	×		Iyanu
"My Dear" (DJ Big N featuring Don Jazzy and Kiss Daniel)	2018	×	×	×		Non-album singles
"Selense" (Harrysong featuring Reekado Banks and Kizz Daniel)	2018	×	×	×		Non-album singles
"You Go Wait?" (Demmie Vee featuring and Kizz Daniel)	2018	×	×	×		Non-album singles
"Loyal" (Major Lazer featuring Kizz Daniel and Kranium)	2018	×	×	×		Major Lazer Essentials
"Gina" (Becca featuring Kizz Daniel)	2018	×	×	×		Non-album singles
"Ori Mi" (DJ Xclusive featuring Kizz Daniel)	2018	×	×	×		Non-album singles
"Send Her Money" (DJ Enimoney featuring Olamide, LK Kuddy, Kizz Daniel, and Kranium)	2018	×	×	×		YBNL Mafia Family
"True" (Mayorkun featuring Kizz Daniel)	2019	×	×	×		Non-album singles
"Ello Baby" (Young Jonn featuring Kizz Daniel and Tiwa Savage)	2019	×	×	×		Non-album singles
"Jore" (Adekunle Gold featuring Kizz Daniel)	2020	×	×	×		Non-album singles
"Somebody" (Skiibii featuring Kizz Daniel)	2020	×	×	×		Non-album singles
"iFear" (Chris Marshall featuring Justin Quiles and Kizz Daniel)	2020	–	×	×		Non-album singles
"Morale (High)" (LK Kuddy featuring Kizz Daniel)	2020	–	—	×		Non-album singles
"Waist" (King Perryy featuring Kizz Daniel)	2020	–	—	×		African Boy
"Aiye Kan (One Life)" (Philkeyz featuring Kizz Daniel and Makhanj)	2020	–	—	×		Premium
"Baby Go" (Otile Brown featuring Kizz Daniel)	2021	—	—	×		Non-album singles
"Bluffin" (Afro B featuring Kizz Daniel)	2022	—	—	×		Non-album singles
"No Wahala" (Remix) (1da Banton featuring Kizz Daniel and Tiwa Savage)	2022	—	9	29	TCSN: Platinum	Non-album singles
"Like" (Iyanya featuring Davido and Kizz Daniel)	2022	—	—	—		The 6th Wave
"Big Big Things" (Young Jonn featuring Kizz Daniel and Seyi Vibez)	2023	—	—	—	TCSN: Platinum	Jiggy Forever
"Gwagwalada" (Bnxn featuring Kizz Daniel and Seyi Vibez)	2023	1	4	12	TCSN: 2× Platinum	Sincerely, Benson
"My Dealer" (Remix) (Kaestyle featuring Kizz Daniel)	2024	3	—	—		Non-album single
"Lost" (Fola featuring Kizz Daniel)	2025	3	8	11		Catharsis
"Follow Her" (Blaqbonez featuring Kizz Daniel)	2025	—	—	—		Non-album singles
"Day by Day" (Simi featuring Kizz Daniel)	2025	—	—	—		Non-album singles
"A1" (Shoday featuring Kizz Daniel)	2025	—	—	—		Hybrid
"—" denotes a recording that did not chart or was not released in that territory. "×" denotes that the chart did not exist at the time.

== Other charted and certified songs ==
List of songs, with selected chart positions and certifications, showing year released and album name
Title	Year	Peak chart positions				Certifications	Album
Title	Year	NLD	NGR	UK Afro.	US Afro.	Certifications	Album
"Nesesari" (featuring Philkeyz)	2018	10	—	—	—	TCSN: Platinum	No Bad Songz
"Pour Me Water"	2021	—	20	15	38	TCSN: Platinum	Barnabas
"Eh God (Barnabas)"	2021	—	—	14	44	TCSN: Platinum	Barnabas
"Burn"	2021	—	—	—	43		Barnabas
"Oshe" (featuring The Cavemen)	2021	—	—	—	—	TCSN: Platinum	Barnabas
"Eh God (Barnabas)"	2021	—	—	14	44	TCSN: Platinum	Barnabas
"Showa"	2024	—	—	3	—	TCSN: 2× Platinum	TZA
"Sooner"	2024	—	—	5	—		TZA
"Titi" (featuring Fola)	2025	—	6	8	15		Uncle K: Lemon Chase
"Black Girl Magic"	2025	—	15	—	16		Uncle K: Lemon Chase
"Secure"	2025	—	—	—	19		Uncle K: Lemon Chase
"Peace I Chose" (featuring Runtown)	2025	—	—	—	23		Uncle K: Lemon Chase
"Eyo"	2025	—	—	—	32		Uncle K: Lemon Chase
"—" denotes a recording that did not chart or was not released in that territory. "×" denotes that the chart did not exist at the time.

== Guest appearances ==
List of non-single guest appearances, with other performing artists, showing year released and album name
Title	Year	Other artist(s)	Album
"Make Me Wanna"	2015	Jahbless, Akymz	I Am Me
"Ekene"	2017	Sugarboy	Believe
"Wait"	2018	DJ Neptune	Greatness
"Surrender"	2018	Seyi Shay	Electric Package, Vol. 1
"Take Your Place"	2019	Akon	Akonda
"Which One"	2019	Sarkodie	Black Love
"Koroga"	2021	Rayvanny	Sound from Africa
"Gyal Like You"	2023	Patoranking	World Best
"YBIL (You Believe in Love)"	2024	Qing Madi	Qing Madi (Deluxe)
"Joy is Coming" (Remix)	2025	Fido	Olayemi
"Pansa Pansa"	2025	Flavour	Afroculture

== Music videos ==
=== As lead artist ===
List of music videos, showing year released and director
Title	Year	Director(s)	Ref.
"Shoye"	2014	MEX Films	
"Woju"	2014	Adasa Cookey	
"Woju" (Remix) (featuring Tiwa Savage and Davido)	2015	Adasa Cookey	
"Laye"	2015	AJE Filmworks	
"Molue" (with Sugarboy)	2015	HG2 Films	
"Good Time"	2015	AJE Filmworks	
"Mama"	2016	AJE Filmworks	
"Jombo"	2016	AJE Filmworks	
"Sin City"	2016	HG2 Films	
"Upon Me" (featuring Sugarboy)	2016	AJE Filmworks	
"Duro"	2017	Patrick Elis	
"Sofa"	2017	Clarence Peters	
"Yeba"	2017	Clarence Peters	
"4Dayz"	2018	Sesan	
"For You" (featuring Wizkid)	2018	Ovie Etseyatse	
"One Ticket" (featuring Davido)	2018	Ovie Etseyatse	
"Madu"	2019	AJE Filmworks	
"Poko"	2019	Clarence Peters	
"Eko"	2019	Daniel Vintage	
"Pak 'n' Go"	2019	Ovie Etseyatse	
"Jaho"	2020	TG Omori	
"Ada"	2020	TG Omori	
"Aii"	2020	—	
"Boys Are Bad"	2020	AJE Filmworks	
"Flex"	2021	The Alien	
"Nesesari" (featuring Philkeyz)	2021	AJE Filmworks	
"Lie"	2021	The Alien	
"Pour Me Water"	2021	The Alien	
"Oshe" (featuring The Cavemen)	2022	The Alien	
"Buga" (featuring Tekno)	2022	TG Omori	
"Cough (Odo)"	2022	Director K	
"RTID (Rich Till I Die)"	2023	TG Omori	
"Shu-Peru"	2023	TG Omori	
"My G"	2023	TG Omori	
"Twe Twe" (Remix) (featuring Davido)	2024	TG Omori	
"Showa"	2024	TG Omori	
"Double"	2024	TG Omori	
"Police" (featuring Johnny Drille and Angélique Kidjo)	2025	Jyde Ajala	

=== As featured artist ===
List of videos as featured artist, artist(s), showing year released and director
Title	Artist(s)	Year	Director	Ref.
"Raba"	DJ Shabsy, Sugarboy	2015	AJE Filmworks	
"Kilamity"	Sugarboy	2017	AJE Filmworks	
"Gbayi"	CDQ	2018	Unlimited L.A	
"Me Ke"	Omawumi	2018	Unlimited L.A	
"Baba"	DJ Spinall	2018	Director Q	
"Wait"	DJ Neptune	2018	Adasa Cookey	
"Surrender"	Seyi Shay	2018	Clarence Peters	
"Loyal"	Major Lazer, Kranium	2018	Adriaan Louw	
"You Go Wait?"	Demmie Vee	2018	Adasa Cookey	
"Gina"	Becca	2018	Paluse	
"Ori Mi"	DJ Xclusive	2018	Adasa Cookey	
"Send Her Money"	DJ Enimoney, Olamide, Kranium, LK Kuddy	2018	Unlimited L.A	
"True"	Mayorkun	2019	AJE Filmworks	
"Ello Baby"	Young Jonn, Tiwa Savage	2019	Sesan	
"Somebody"	Skiibii	2020	TG Omori	
"Jore"	Adekunle Gold	2020	AJE Filmworks	
"iFear"	Chris Marshall, Justin Quiles	2020	Squid	
"Morale (High)"	LK Kuddy	2020	—	
"Waist"	King Perryy	2020	Kemz	
"Baby Go"	Otile Brown	2021	The Alien	
"No Wahala" (Remix)	1da Banton, Tiwa Savage	2022	Adasa Cookey	
"Bluffin"	Afro B	2022	Yuki and Allen	
"Like"	Iyanya, Davido	2022	Olu the Wave	
"Aiye Kan (One Life)"	Philkeyz, Makhanj	2022	—	
"Gwagwalada"	Bnxn, Seyi Vibez	2023	Perliks	
"Big Big Things"	Young Jonn, Seyi Vibez	2024	TG Omori	
"Lost"	Fola	2025	Kambi Pictures	
"Day by Day"	Simi	2025	Lensgod	
