= Maverick (Kizz Daniel album) =

Studio album by Kizz Daniel
- Released: 28 July 2023
- Genres: Afrobeats; R&B
- Length: 53:00
- Languages: Yoruba; English; Nigerian Pidgin
- Labels: Flyboy; Empire
- Producers: Philkeyz; DeeYasso; Yung Willis; Shugavibez; Reward Beatz; Xtofa; Roc Legion; M.O.G Beatz; Ayzed; DJ Coublon; Mr. Soul; Johnny Drille; Blaisebeatz; Fiokee; Sparrq; Juwonmix

Kizz Daniel chronology
Barnabas (2021)	Maverick (2023)	TZA (2024)

Singles from Maverick
- 1. "Flex" Released: 26 February 2021; 2. "Buga" Released: 4 May 2022; 3. "Cough (Odo)" Released: 14 October 2022; 4. "RTID (Rich Till I Die)" Released: 6 January 2023; 5. "Shu-Peru" Released: 12 May 2023; 6. "Cough (Remix)" Released: 21 July 2023; 7. "My G" Released: 9 October 2023

Maverick is the fourth studio album by Nigerian singer Kizz Daniel. It was released on 28 July 2023, through Flyboy Inc and Empire Distribution. The album features guest appearances from Johnny Drille, Yemi Alade, Blaqbonez, Becky G, Young Jonn, Jahmiel, Tekno, Pryme, Nomcebo Zikode, Chike, Not3s and DJ Big N, and Daniel's two children Jalil and Jelani. Kizz Daniel enlisted production from Philkeyz, DeeYasso, Yung Willis, Shugavibez, Reward Beatz, Xtofa, Roc Legion, M.O.G Beatz, Ayzed, DJ Coublon, Mr. Soul, Johnny Drille, Blaisebeatz, Fiokee, Sparrq and Juwonmix.

== Background and recording ==
Kizz Daniel began working on Maverick at his Lagos residence just three months prior to its release. Originally, the artist had planned to release an album titled Color of Happiness in 2023, but due to "in-house reasons," he decided to create a new project, which became Maverick. The album explores personal themes related to family, life, and loss, reflecting on Kizz Daniel's experiences over the three years since his last release. As the title suggests, Maverick embodies Kizz Daniel's decision to create music on his own terms, combining introspective moments with his signature Afrobeats sound.

== Singles ==
The lead single "Flex," was released on 26 February 2021 and was produced by DJ Coublon. The second single, "Buga," features Tekno and was produced by Blaisebeatz, Yung Willis and Reward Beatz. Kizz Daniel announced the release of "Buga" on Instagram on the day of 4 May 2022, offering a ₦1,000,000 prize for the best Buga video content, with fans serving as the judges. He encouraged followers to participate and provided the link to the song in his bio. The third single "Cough (Odo)" was released on 14 October 2022, and was the lead single off the Empire Distribution compilation album, Where We Come From, Vol. 01 (2022). The song was produced by Blaisebeatz with uncredited production from Philkeyz.

"RTID (Rich Till I Die)" was released on 6 January 2023, as the fourth single from Maverick. Produced by Reward Beatz and Blaisebeatz, its video, directed by TG Omori, reached over 1.7 million views in the span of three days. The Reward Beatz-produced fifth single off Maverick, "Shu-Peru," was released on 12 May 2023, and was mixed and mastered by Jaycen Joshua. The sixth single is the remix of the third single, "Cough (Odo)," and was remixed with Becky G on 21 July 2023. The seventh single off the album "My G" was released on 9 October 2023 with a TG Omori-directed music video.

== Critical reception ==
The album received mixed reviews from critics. Adeayo Adebiyi of Pulse Nigeria critiqued Maverick for lacking artistic depth, variety, and excitement, calling it a monotonous experience. While praising the album's opener "Red & Green" and some moments like "Feran You Two," Adebiyi found the project to be disappointingly unvaried across its 20 tracks. He gave the album a rating of 5.5/10, labeling it "average." Patrick Ezema of Afrocritik described Maverick as an uncertain and directionless album, noting that Kizz Daniel struggles to evolve musically. While the album has its good moments, the writing often falls flat, and the music feels repetitive. Ezema summarized, “Ultimately, Maverick fails to find its footing.” He also gave the album a rating of 5.5/10.

=== Accolades ===
Year	Awards ceremony	Award description(s)	Results
2023	Trace Awards & Festival	Album of the Year	Nominated

== Track listing ==
Maverick track listing
No.	Title	Writer(s)	Producer(s)	Length
1.	"Red & Green"	Oluwatobiloba Anidugbe	Johnny Drille	1:54
2.	"My G"	Anidugbe	DJ Coublon; Roc Legion; M.O.G Beatz; Killertunes; Fiokee	2:40
3.	"Flex"	Anidugbe; Akwuba Ugochukwu	DJ Coublon	3:07
4.	"Cough (Odo)"	Anidugbe	Philkeyz; Blaisebeatz	2:56
5.	"Show You Off" (featuring Pryme)	Anidugbe; Promise Chibuike Nwabueze	Blaisebeatz; Shugavibez	2:27
6.	"Shu-Peru"	Anidugbe; Joseph Watchorn; John Ighodaro	Reward Beatz; Roc Legion	3:10
7.	"Buga" (featuring Tekno)	Anidugbe; Augustine Kelechi	Reward Beatz; Blaisebeatz; Yung Willis	3:03
8.	"Feran You Two" (featuring Jalil and Jelani)	Anidugbe	Ayzed; Mr. Soul	3:37
9.	"Feran Mi" (featuring Johnny Drille)	Anidugbe; Ighodaro	Johnny Drille; Ayzed	3:16
10.	"Complicated" (featuring Jahmiel, Nomcebo Zikode and Not3s)	Anidugbe; Jamiel Foster; Nomcebo Zikode; Lukman Odunaike	Roc Legion; Juwonmix	2:47
11.	"E'better"	Anidugbe	Sparrq; DJ Coublon	3:13
12.	"Blood is Thicker"	Anidugbe	Ayzed; Shugavibez; Blaisebeatz	2:27
13.	"One Dollar" (featuring Blaqbonez)	Anidugbe; Emeka Akumefule	Blaisebeatz	2:01
14.	"Easy to Love" (featuring Chike)	Anidugbe; Chike Osebuka	DeeYasso	2:46
15.	"Pour"	Anidugbe	Reward Beatz; Shugavibez; Blaisebeatz	2:13
16.	"Never"	Anidugbe	Ayzed	2:13
17.	"Anchovy"	Anidugbe	Xtofa; Mr. Soul	2:24
18.	"RTID (Rich Till I Die)"	Anidugbe	Reward Beatz; Blaisebeatz	2:52
19.	"Side Chick" (featuring DJ Big N, Yemi Alade, Young Jonn)	Anidugbe; Nonso Ajufo; Yemi Alade; John Udomboso	M.O.G. Beatz; Blaisebeatz	2:27
20.	"Cough" (remix; featuring Becky G)	Anidugbe; Rebbeca Gomez	Philkeyz; Blaisebeatz	2:57
Total length:				53:00

== Personnel ==
- Oluwatobiloba "Kizz Daniel" Anidugbe – vocals, writer, executive producer
- Augustine "Tekno" Kelechi – vocals, writer
- Emeka "Blaqbonez" Akumefule – vocals, writer
- Rebbeca "Becky G" Gomez – vocals, writer
- Chike Osebuka – vocals, writer
- Promise "Pryme" Nwabueke – vocals, writer
- Lukman "Not3s" Odunaike – vocals, writer
- Yemi Alade – vocals, writer
- John "Young Jonn" Udomboso – vocals, writer
- Nomcebo Zikode – vocals, writer
- Nonso "DJ Big N" Ajufo – vocals, writer
- John "Johnny Drille" Ighodaro – vocals, writer, producer
- Akwuba Charles Ugochukwu – producer, writer
- Marcel "Blaisebeatz" Akunwata – producer
- Philip "Philkeyz" Chukwuka – producer
- Dennis "DeeYasso" Yasso – producer
- Daniel "Yung Willis" Williams – producer
- Godwin "Shugavibez" Ifeanyi – producer
- Olawale "Reward Beatz" Isaac – producer
- Mbah "Xtofa" Christoper – producer
- Joseph "Roc Legion" Watchorn – producer
- John "M.O.G. Beatz" Dosunmu-Mensah – producer
- Azuka "Ayzed" Akaeze – producer
- Koroma "Mr. Soul"Richard – producer
- Ifiok "Fiokee" Effanga – producer
- Ayomikun "Sparrq" Emmanuel-Aro – producer
- Juwonmix – producer

== Release history ==
Release history and formats for Maverick
Region	Date	Format	Label
Various	28 July 2023	Streaming; digital download	Flyboy; Empire
