= My G (Kizz Daniel song) =

Single by Kizz Daniel

from the album Maverick
- Released: 9 October 2023
- Length: 2:40
- Label: Flyboy; Empire
- Songwriter: Oluwatobiloba Daniel Anidugbe
- Producers: DJ Coublon; Roc Legion; M.O.G Beatz; Killertunes; Fiokee

Kizz Daniel singles chronology
| "Cough" (remix) (2023) | "My G" (2023) | "Unleash" (2023) |

Music video
- "My G" on YouTube

"My G" is a song by Nigerian singer Kizz Daniel. It was released on 9 October 2023, through Flyboy I.N.C and Empire Distribution, as the seventh and final single from his fourth studio album Maverick (2023). Produced by DJ Coublon, Roc Legion, M.O.G Beatz, Killertunes, and Fiokee, the song gained further attention through a viral TikTok challenge that highlighted its lyrics and boosted its popularity.

== Promotion and viral TikTok challenge ==
In October 2023, Kizz Daniel launched the "My G" challenge on TikTok, coinciding with the release of the song's music video. The challenge quickly went viral, amassing over 26,000 entries within its first week. Participants showcased expensive items they owned while syncing to the song's lyrics, generating significant buzz on the platform. The challenge attracted participation from notable celebrities, including Davido, Toke Makinwa, and Iyabo Ojo, further amplifying its popularity.

== Composition ==
"My G," the second track off Maverick, continues the reflective atmosphere set by the album's intro. In this song, Kizz Daniel confidently hits back at critics, asserting control over his career with lines like, "Ko kan aye, what I do with my life / If I broke, I go contain am." The track highlights his mastery of a stirring vocal style, blending vulnerability with self-assurance, and is underscored by a resonant choral arrangement.

== Critical reception ==
Patrick Ezema of Afrocritik described "My G" as a standout track on Maverick, praising its introspective nature and bold critique of societal expectations. He highlighted Kizz Daniel's candid lyrics and the compelling choral arrangement, which reinforce the song's resonant theme.

== Charts ==
=== Weekly charts ===
Chart performance for "My G"
| Chart (2022) | Peak position |
|---|---|
| Nigeria (TurnTable Top 100) | 11 |
| UK Afrobeats (Official Charts) | 15 |

=== Year-end charts ===
2023 year-end chart performance for "My G"
| Chart (2023) | Position |
|---|---|
| End of Year Charts (TurnTable Top 100) | 63 |

== Personnel ==
Credits adapted from Apple Music.

- Oluwatobiloba Daniel Anidugbe – vocals, songwriter
- DJ Coublon – production
- Roc Legion – production
- M.O.G Beatz – production
- Killertunes – production
- Fiokee – production

== Release history ==
Release history and formats for "My G"
| Region | Date | Format | Label | Ref |
|---|---|---|---|---|
| Various | 9 October 2023 | Streaming; digital download | Flyboy; Empire | |
