= Lie (Kizz Daniel song) =

Single by Kizz Daniel

from the EP Barnabas
- Language: English; Nigerian Pidgin
- Released: 6 August 2021
- Genre: Afro pop; Afrobeat; Afro-soul
- Length: 2:36
- Label: Flyboy; Empire
- Songwriter: Oluwatobiloba Daniel Anidugbe
- Producers: Philkeyz; Ayzed; Blaisebeatz; Vtek; Miki

Kizz Daniel singles chronology
"Flex" (2021)	"Lie" (2021)	"Buga" (2022)

Music video
- "Lie" on YouTube

"Lie" is a song by Nigerian singer Kizz Daniel. It was released on 6 August 2021 through Flyboy I.N.C and Empire Distribution as the only single from his first EP Barnabas. The afro pop single was produced by Philkeyz with co-production from Ayzed, Blaisebeatz, Vtek and Miki.

== Background ==
In July 2021, Kizz Daniel's brother and manager, Uthy, announced the song's release in an Instagram post. "Lie" was previewed, also on Instagram, in a post posted by Ayzed, one of the song's producers, of two men and women dancing to the song playing in the background.

== Composition and lyrics ==
"Lie" is a mid-tempo Afrobeat track produced by Philkeyz, Ayzed, Blaisebeatz, Vtek, and Miki, featuring rhythmic Afro-soul synths and emotive chord progressions. It opens with an almost a cappella rendition of the Pidgin line, "Everybody know say, omo me I no dey lie." The song, blending English and Pidgin, features Kizz Daniel conveying his commitment to honesty and genuine affection for his love interest.

Additionally, the lyrics incorporate themes of body positivity, notably in the line, "Girl, I don't really care about your body type/what really matter na your vibe" in the first verse, which emphasizes the importance of personality and connection over physical appearance. Kizz Daniel explained that the inspiration for "Lie" came from a personal experience, saying, "I wrote this song to express my feelings at the time. I wanted her to know that my love was genuine and my intentions were nothing but good."

== Critical reception ==
"Lie" received positive reception for its seamless production and relatable themes. Naijaloaded noted that the song stays true to the "classic Kizz Daniel" formula, featuring sultry vocals and familiar Afro-pop instrumentals. The review remarked on its resemblance to tracks from his earlier works, such as No Bad Songz and King of Love, and described it as a solid yet conventional entry in his discography. While considered unlikely to achieve major commercial success, it was acknowledged as a quality song, further reinforcing Kizz Daniel's reputation for consistently delivering well-crafted music. It was rated a 7/10.

Reviewing Barnabas, Dennis Ade Peter of the Native highlighted the song's understated yet effective beat, which complements Kizz Daniel's breezy vocal delivery and ad-lib harmonies. He noted the track's effortless quality, describing it as emblematic of Kizz Daniel's mastery of Nigerian pop music.

Fatiat Saliu of Afrocritik commended the song for addressing themes of body positivity, particularly through lyrics like, "Girl, I don't really care about your body type," which challenge conventional societal norms. She regarded the track as a standout that remains relevant for its message and artistry.

== Charts ==
=== Weekly charts ===
Chart performance for "Lie"
Chart (2021)	Peak position
Nigeria (TurnTable)	1
UK Afrobeats Singles (OCC)	8

=== Year-end charts ===
2021 year-end chart performance for "Lie"
Chart (2021)	Position
TurnTable End of the Year Top 50 of 2021	6

== Certifications ==
Certifications for Lie
Region	Certification	Certified units/sales
Nigeria (TCSN)	3× Platinum	300,000^{‡}
^{‡} Sales+streaming figures based on certification alone.
