= Where We Come From, Vol. 01 =

EMPIRE Presents: Where We Come From, Vol. 01

Compilation album by Empire Distribution
- Released: 30 November 2022
- Genre: Afrobeats; drill; amapiano; trap; R&B
- Length: 54:31
- Label: Empire
- Producer: Kuami Eugene; M.O.G Beatz; Blaisebeatz; Philkeyz; OG Parker; Tee Romano; Sam-E Lee Jones; Leandro "Dro" Hidalgo; Phil Mango; Mike Robbins; Hitmaka; AyeYP; Sak Pase; Kheilstone; Zay Bandz; Say-Zay; Semzi; Nahreel; Eskeez; Joker Nharnah; Tenroc; Happie; Frankie Bash; BAK; KDE; Kendi Beats; Magicsticks

Empire Distribution chronology
EMPIRE Presents: Voices For Change, Vol. 1 (2020)	EMPIRE Presents: Where We Come From, Vol. 01 (2022)	EMPIRE Presents: House of Empire (2023)

Singles from EMPIRE Presents: Where We Come From, Vol. 01
- 1. "Cough (Odo)" Released: 14 October 2022; 2. "Umbrella" Released: 27 October 2022; 3. "Loaded" Released: 7 November 2022; 4. "I Feel Nice" Released: 12 December 2022; 5. "Thing for You" Released: 17 May 2023

EMPIRE Presents: Where We Come From, Vol. 01, commonly referred to as Where We Come From, Vol. 01, is a compilation album by American record label and distribution company Empire Distribution. The album was released on 30 November 2022, by the label, and features mainly African acts from Nigeria, Ghana, Tanzania, Cape Verde, Morocco and South Africa.

It features guest appearances include Tiwa Savage, Kuami Eugene, Kizz Daniel, Black Sherif, L.A.X, Fireboy DML, Bnxn, Wande Coal, Bad Boy Timz, KiDi, Cheque, Tolani, June Freedom, Yaw Tog, Leil, Navy Kenzo, and Group Chat. Production was handled by Kuami Eugene, M.O.G Beatz, Blaisebeatz, Philkeyz, OG Parker, Tee Romano, Sam-E Lee Jones, Leandro "Dro" Hidalgo, Phil Mango, Mike Robbins, Hitmaka, AyeYP, Sak Pase, Kheilstone, Zay Bandz, Say-Zay, Semzi, Nahreel, Eskeez, Joker Nharnah, Tenroc, Happie, Frankie Bash, BAK, KDE, Kendi Beats and Magicsticks. The album was supported by the singles, "Cough (Odo)", "Umbrella", "Loaded", "I Feel Nice", and "Thing for You".

== Background ==
The project developed from a writing camp held at Empire's San Francisco headquarters following the label's "The New Africa" showcase at South by Southwest (SXSW) in March 2022. Artists including Bnxn and Wande Coal took part in the sessions. The album's cover art was designed by Nigerian artist Dricky Stickman.

== Singles ==
The album's lead single, "Cough (Odo)", coincided with the accouncement of the album on 14 October 2022 and was performed by Nigerian singer Kizz Daniel. The song was produced by Philkeyz and Blaisebeatz and was also the third single off Kizz Daniel's fourth studio album Maverick. The second single, "Umbrella", is performed by Nigerian singer Wande Coal and was released on 27 October 2022. The song was co-written by Sean Kingston and Sak Pase, and was produced by Sak Pase, with additional production from Zay Bandz, Say-Zay, and Kheilstone. Its release coincided with its music video which was directed by Austin McCracken.

The third single, "Loaded", is performed by Nigerian singers Tiwa Savage and Asake, and was released on 7 November 2022 with an accompanying music video directed by TG Omori. The fourth single, "I Feel Nice", is performed by Ghanaian singer Kuami Eugene and South African girl group Group Chat. The song was released on 12 December 2022 and was produced by Eugene and M.O.G Beatz. The fifth and final single "Thing for You" was performed by Cape Verdean singer June Freedom featuring Nigerian singer L.A.X and was released on 17 May 2023 alongside an Edgar Esteves-directed video.

== Track listing ==
Where We Come From, Vol. 01 track listing
No.	Title	Writer(s)	Producer(s)	Length
1.	"I Feel Nice" (performed by Kuami Eugene and Group Chat)	Eugene Marfo; Sinentlanhla Sotshongani; Mmalehlohonolo Mokoena; Fatima Tembe	Eugene; M.O.G Beatz	2:40
2.	"Cough (Odo)" (performed by Kizz Daniel)	Oluwatobiloba Anidugbe	Philkeyz; Blaisebeatz	2:56
3.	"Slow Motion" (performed by Tolani and Wande Coal)	Olawunmi Otedola; Oluwatobi Ojosipe	OG Parker; Tee Romano; Sam-E Lee Jones	2:38
4.	"Bank Alert" (performed by L.A.X)	Damilola Afolabi	Leandro "Dro" Hidalgo; Phil Mango; Mike Robbins	2:34
5.	"Dance 4 Me" (performed by KiDi and Bnxn)	Dennis Dwamena; Daniel Benson; Ivory Scott; Christopher Dotson; Christian Ward	Aye YB; Hitmaka; Tee Romano	2:23
6.	"Umbrella" (performed by Wande Coal)	Ojosipe; Kisean Anderson; Shama Joseph	Sak Pase; SayZay; Kheilstone; Zay Bans	2:56
7.	"Faya" (performed by Bad Boy Timz)	Olorunyomi Oloruntimilehin	Semzi	2:10
8.	"Hold On" (performed by Navy Kenzo and Fireboy DML)	Aika Marealle; Emmanuel Mkono; Adedamola Adefolahan	Shully; Nahreel	2:49
9.	"Thing for You" (performed by June Freedom and L.A.X)	Pedro Veiga; Afolabi; Hidalgo; Phil Mango	Mango; Hidalgo	2:32
10.	"Wound Someone" (performed by Olamide)	Olamide Adedeji	Eskeez	2:37
11.	"Run" (performed by Black Sherif)	Mohammed Sherif	Joker Nharnah	2:32
12.	"In The Middle" (performed by Leil and Bnxn)	Leil; Benson	Hitmaka; Tenroc	3:23
13.	"Off White" (performed by Cheque)	Akanbi Brett	Happie; Frankie Bash; Bak; KDE	2:30
14.	"Ring My Phone" (performed by Yaw Tog)	Thorsten Gyimah	Khendibeatz	2:17
15.	"Loaded" (performed by Tiwa Savage and Asake)	Tiwatope Savage; Ahmed Ololade; Adedeji	Magicsticks	2:35
Total length:				54:31

== Release history ==
Release history and formats for Where We Come From, Vol. 01
Region	Date	Format	Label
Various	30 November 2022	Streaming; digital download	Empire Distribution
