= Jiggy Forever =

Studio album by Young Jonn
- Released: 12 April 2024
- Genre: Afrobeats; amapiano
- Length: 42:10
- Language: English; Nigerian Pidgin; Yoruba
- Label: Chocolate City
- Producer: P.Priime; ePianoh; Telz; BabyBeatz; Magicsticks; Yung Willis; Jhay2unez; T Mode; Ragee; Blaisebeatz; Jaytunes

Young Jonn chronology
Love Is Not Enough, Vol. 2 (2022)	Jiggy Forever (2024)

Singles from Jiggy Forever
- 1. "Aquafina" Released: 28 April 2023; 2. "Sharpally" Released: 21 July 2023; 3. "Go Hard" Released: 17 November 2023; 4. "Big Big Things" Released: 23 February 2024

Jiggy Forever is the debut studio album by Nigerian singer and producer Young Jonn. It was released on 12 April 2024, through Chocolate City Music, and features collaborations from Kizz Daniel, Seyi Vibez, Don Jazzy, Zlatan, Blaqbonez, Sean Paul and Ya Levis. Production was handled by P.Priime, ePianoh, Telz, BabyBeatz, Magicsticks, Yung Willis, Jhay2unez, T Mode, Ragee, Blaisebeatz and Jaytunes. The album serves as a follow-up to Love Is Not Enough, Vol. 2 (2022).

== Background and promotion ==
Jiggy Forever was created spontaneously, with Young Jonn recording songs without initially planning an album. He later selected tracks that conveyed the emotions he wanted for his debut. The album embodies the "Jiggy Era," which he describes as a lifestyle of "staying fresh, staying fly, staying above all of the noise." A deeply personal track, "Stronger," reflects on the loss of his mother, with Jonn sharing, "I wasn’t planning on recording this type of song... It wasn’t something I was keen to share because they were emotions I had buried. But when I started recording, I knew that I had to see it through because it was bigger than me." This period of growth through hardship is central to the album's themes of resilience and self-expression.

The album's release date was announced on 5 April 2024.

Jiggy Forever was promoted with a North American tour, with concerts all around places such as Montreal, Providence, New York City, Philadelphia, Silver Spring, Chicago, Atlanta, Dallas, Oakland and Los Angeles.

== Music and lyrics ==
Jiggy Forever delves into themes of love, ambition, heartbreak, and loss. The album opens with "Tony Montana," where he confidently asserts his identity, while "Pot of Gold" uses the Erhu to explore the pursuit of wealth and happiness. Tracks like "Aquafina" and "Big Big Things" delve into love and desire, revealing Young Jonn's complex approach to relationships. A poignant moment arises in "Stronger," a tribute to his mother that confronts personal pain, contrasted by the sensual "Hold On," featuring Sean Paul. Concluding with "Go Hard," which explores brotherhood and resilience, the album navigates themes of love, ambition, and personal growth but occasionally lacks emotional depth and lyrical sophistication, indicating areas for refinement as he evolves as an artist.

== Critical reception ==
Professional ratings
Review scores
Source	Rating
Afrocritik	5.3/10
Pulse Nigeria	6.9/10

Hope Ibiale of Afrocritik noted that Jiggy Forever effectively explores the album's themes of love, hustle, heartbreak, and grief, positioning it as a significant declaration of Young Jonn's identity; however, it ultimately fell short in emotional depth and lyrical sophistication, receiving a rating of 5.3/10. As Ibiale stated, "the same lacklustre delivery and sparse lyrics on the project rob Young Jonn of the glamour and excitement expected from a debut album."

In Adeayo Adebiyi's review for Pulse Nigeria, he described Jiggy Forever as a collection of enjoyable but formulaic songs that ultimately failed to provide a compelling listening experience, as Young Jonn relied heavily on familiar Amapiano production throughout the 16 tracks; the review highlighted that despite showcasing his potential as an Afrobeats hitmaker, the album suffered from monotony and a lack of experimentation, receiving a rating of 6.9/10. Adebiyi noted, "Young Jonn failed to do this on his debut LP," emphasizing the need for more creativity in his approach.

Culture Custodian's review of Jiggy Forever was recognized as Young Jonn's debut album that, while showcasing his vocal prowess and the potential for engaging themes about youthful wealth, ultimately faltered due to its repetitive nature and a lack of thematic depth across its 16 tracks; the review noted, "For a sixteen-track album, Jiggy Forever does not have enough material or melody to make each song stand out." The album's highlights came from guest features that added personality, but overall, it struggled with homogeneity and failed to deliver a compelling listening experience.

== Track listing ==
Jiggy Forever track listing
No.	Title	Writer(s)	Producer(s)	Length
1.	"Tony Montana"	John Udomboso	Jhay2unez	2:09
2.	"Pot of Gold"	Udomboso	ePianoh	2:35
3.	"Bahamas"	Udomboso	T Mode	2:46
4.	"Aquafina"	Udomboso	Magicsticks	2:48
5.	"Big Big Things" (featuring Kizz Daniel and Seyi Vibez)	Udomboso; Oluwatobiloba Anidugbe; Balogun Oluwaseyi	Yung Willis	3:00
6.	"Bucket List"	Udomboso	Blaisebeatz	2:41
7.	"Showcase" (featuring Blaqbonez)	Udomboso; Emeka Akumefele	BabyBeatz	2:47
8.	"Jeje"	Udomboso	Jhay2unez	2:56
9.	"Stronger"	Udomboso	Ragee	2:21
10.	"Hold On" (featuring Sean Paul)	Udomboso; Sean Paul Henriques	Telz	3:03
11.	"Maya Maya" (featuring Ya Levis)	Udomboso; Prince Nemiala	Jhay2unez	2:17
12.	"50 Billion" (featuring Zlatan)	Udomboso; Omoniyi Raphael	P.Priime	2:14
13.	"Full My Tank" (featuring Don Jazzy)	Udomboso; Michael Ajereh	Jhay2unez	2:39
14.	"Shine Shine"	Udomboso	Ragee	2:32
15.	"Sharpally"	Udomboso	Jaytunes	2:43
16.	"Go Hard"	Udomboso	Blaisebeatz	2:33
Total length:				42:10

== Personnel ==
- John "Young Jonn" Udomboso – vocals, writer
- Sean Paul Henriques – vocals, writer
- Oluwatobiloba "Kizz Daniel" Anidugbe – vocals, writer
- Michael "Don Jazzy" Ajereh – vocals, writer
- Emeka "Blaqbonez" Akumefule – vocals, writer
- Omoniyi "Zlatan" Raphael – vocals, writer
- Balogun "Seyi Vibez" Oluwaloseyi - vocals, writer
- Prince "Ya Levis Dalwear" Nemiala - vocals, writer
- P.Priime - production
- ePianoh - production
- Telz - production
- BabyBeatz - production
- Magicsticks - production
- Yung Willis - production
- Jhay2unez - production
- T Mode - production
- Ragee - production
- Blaisebeatz - production
- Jaytunes - production

== Release history ==
Release history and formats for Jiggy Forever
Region	Date	Format	Label
Various	12 April 2024	Streaming; digital download	Chocolate City
