= TZA (EP) =

EP by Kizz Daniel
- Released: 11 March 2024
- Genre: Afrobeats; pop; Jùjú; Nupe folk music
- Length: 10:51
- Label: Flyboy; Empire
- Producer: Ayzed; Reward Beatz; P.Priime; Killertunes; Blaisebeatz

Kizz Daniel chronology
Maverick (2023)	TZA (2024)	Uncle K: Lemon Chase (2025)

Singles from TZA
- 1. "Too Busy to Be Bae" Released: 11 December 2023; 2. "Twe Twe" Released: 11 December 2023

TZA is the second extended play by Nigerian singer Kizz Daniel. It was released on 11 March 2024 through Flyboy I.N.C and Empire Distribution. It is a follow-up to Maverick.

== Background ==
TZA was produced for the 10th anniversary of Kizz Daniel in the Nigerian music industry. The title, an abbreviation of "Thanks a lot," appears to express his joy to his fans. Announced on social media prior to its release, the EP included the same tracklist today, except a track titled "Jejeli" was listed. The EP included two singles, "Too Busy To Be Bae" and "Twe Twe," both released on 11 December 2023. "Too Busy To Be Bae" was produced by P.Priime, while "Twe Twe" features production from Ayzed, Killertunes, and Blaisebeatz. To promote the EP, Kizz Daniel embarked on a European tour.

== Critical reception ==
Professional ratings
Review scores
Source	Rating
Afrocritik	6/10

Afrocritik's Abioye Damilare Samson praised TZA as "a commendable project" that stayed true to Kizz Daniel's signature style, with infectious rhythms and a blend of jùjú melodies and groovy production." It rescued a 6/10 rating. Patrick Ezema of the Culture Custodian felt that "while TZA offered some catchy melodies typical of Kizz Daniel, it fell short in lyricism and cohesion, with a "toxic brand of anti-love" in its themes and an overall lack of depth to justify its release."

== Track listing ==
TZA track listing
No.	Title	Writer(s)	Producer(s)	Length
1.	"Sooner"	Oluwatobiloba Anidugbe	Reward Beatz; Ayzed	2:33
2.	"Showa"	Anidugbe	Ayzed	2:55
3.	"Too Busy To Be Bae"	Anidugbe	P.Priime	2:57
4.	"Twe Twe"	Anidugbe; Azuka Akaeze	Ayzed; Killertunes; Blaisebeatz	2:25
Total length:				10:51

== Personnel ==
- Oluwatobiloba "Kizz Daniel" Anidugbe – vocals, writer
- Azuka "Ayzed" Akaeze - producer, writer (track 1, 2, 4)
- Olawale "Reward Beatz" Isaac - producer (track 1)
- Peace "P.Priime" Oredope - producer (track 3)
- Otaniyen-Uwa "Killertunes" Daniel - producer (track 4)
- Marcel "Blaisebeatz" Akunwata – producer (track 4)
- Timilehin "Timi Jay" Jolaoso - mixing engineer, mastering engineer (tracks 1–3)
- Nick Cavalieri - engineer (tracks 1–3)

== Release history ==
Release history and formats for TZA
Region	Date	Format	Label
Various	11 March 2024	Streaming; digital download	Flyboy; Empire
