= Barnabas (EP) =

EP by Kizz Daniel
- Released: 19 November 2021
- Genre: Afrobeats; amapiano; highlife
- Length: 20:40
- Language: Yoruba; English; Nigerian Pidgin
- Label: Flyboy; Empire
- Producer: Philkeyz; Reward Beatz; Roc Legion; DJ Coublon; Blaisebeatz

Kizz Daniel chronology
King of Love (2020)	Barnabas (2021)	Maverick (2023)

Singles from Barnabas
- 1. "Lie" Released: 6 August 2021

Barnabas is the first EP by Nigerian singer Kizz Daniel. It was released on 19 November 2021, by Flyboy I.N.C and Empire Distribution. The EP featured guest appearances from The Cavemen and Kelvyn Colt. Production was handled by Philkeyz, Reward Beatz, Roc Legion, DJ Coublon, Blaisebeatz. Barnabas serves a follow-up to King of Love (2020).

== Background ==
The release of Barnabas was unannounced. The EP came to be, in his words, "I just picked seven random songs from my laptop, put them together and titled it Barnabas." Barnabas was well-received both critically and commercially. All seven tracks debuted on the TurnTable Top 50, with "Lie" spending seven consecutive weeks at number one and "Pour Me Water" also reaching the summit after gaining viral popularity.

== Singles ==
The album's only single "Lie" was released on 6 August 2021. The song was produced by Philkeyz and Blaisebeatz.

== Critical reception ==
Professional ratings
Review scores
Source	Rating
Afrocritik	8.2/10
Pulse Nigeria	6.8/10

Motolani Alake of Pulse Nigeria rated Barnabas a 6.8/10, describing it as "cool, creative and cerebral" but "also abstract". He characterized the EP as a "diary session, with songs crafted around different entries" that achieved sonic cohesion. Fatiat Saliu, writing for Afrocritik praised Barnabas as a cohesive and reflective project, showcasing Kizz Daniel's growth in sound, storytelling, and message delivery, stating that "he reasserts his position as one of the best artistes in the country." She rated the EP 8.2/10. Dennis Ade Peter of The Native highlighted Kizz Daniel's consistency on Barnabas, praising his ability to stay within familiar musical boundaries while delivering solid results, noting that "Kizz Daniel knows the groove he prefers, and he remains as reliable as ever."

== Track listing ==
Barnabas track listing
No.	Title	Writer(s)	Producer(s)	Length
1.	"Pour Me Water"	Oluwatobiloba Anidugbe	Blaisebeatz	2:26
2.	"Addict"	Anidugbe	Reward Beatz	3:24
3.	"Eh God (Barnabas)"	Anidugbe	Reward Beatz	3:04
4.	"Oshe" (featuring The Cavemen)	Anidugbe	Blaisebeatz	2:38
5.	"Burn"	Anidugbe	Young Jonn; Roc Legion	3:01
6.	"Lie"	Anidugbe	Philkeyz; Blaisebeatz	2:36
7.	"Skin" (featuring Kelvyn Colt)	Anidugbe	DJ Coublon	3:28
Total length:				20:40

== Personnel ==
- Oluwatobiloba "Kizz Daniel" Anidugbe – vocals, writer
- Kelvyn "Colt" Ajala – vocals, writer
- Benjamin James – drums (track 4)
- Kingsley Okorie – bass (track 4)
- Marcel "Blaisebeatz" Akunwata – production
- Joseph "Roc Legion" Watchorn – production
- Akwuba "DJ Coublon" Ugochukwu – production
- Phillip "Philkeyz" Chukwuka – production
- John "Young Jonn" Udomboso – production
- Olawale "Reward Beatz" Isaac – production

== Release history ==
Release history and formats for Barnabas
Region	Date	Format	Label
Various	19 November 2021	Streaming; digital download	Flyboy; Empire
