= Gwagwalada (song) =

Single by Bnxn, Kizz Daniel, and Seyi Vibez

from the album Sincerely, Benson
- Released: 16 February 2023
- Genre: Afrobeats; amapiano
- Length: 3:08
- Label: TYE; Empire
- Songwriters: Daniel Etiese Benson; Oluwatobiloba Daniel Anidugbe; Balogun Afolabi Oluwaloseyi
- Producer: Sarz

Bnxn singles chronology
"Wo Wo (Remix)" (2023)	"Gwagwalada" (2023)	"Sinner" (2023)

Kizz Daniel singles chronology
"RTID (Rich Till I Die)" (2023)	"Gwagwalada" (2023)	"Shu-Peru" (2023)

Seyi Vibez singles chronology
"Let There Be Light" (2023)	"Gwagwalada" (2023)	"Hat-trick" (2023)

Music video
- "Gwagwalada" on YouTube

"Gwagwalada" is a song by Nigerian singers Bnxn, Kizz Daniel, and Seyi Vibez. It was released on 16 February 2023, through TYE and Empire Distribution, and was produced by Sarz. Released as the second single off Bnxn's debut album Sincerely, Benson (2023), "Gwagwalada" was included on OkayAfrica's list of "the Best Afrobeats Songs of 2023".

== Background ==
Prior to the song's release, Bnxn posted a teaser video via his Twitter to promote "Gwagwalada".

== Critical reception ==
In Michael Aromolaran's review of Bnxn's debut album Sincerely, Benson for the Culture Custodian, he noted that Bnxn's approach to "Gwagwalada" is highlighted as blending imaginative storytelling with soulful collaboration. Despite never having visited the titular town in Abuja, Bnxn "creates a soulful jam" alongside Kizz Daniel and Seyi Vibez, portraying Gwagwalada as "an Edenic retreat from life's bustles, a negativity-free zone". The review also interprets the song as an extension of Bnxn's outlook, particularly evident in the line, "I no fit force am if e don pass my power".

The review from Emmanuel Daraloye, Yinoluwa Olowofoyekun, and Emmanuel Okoro of Afrocritik of Sincerely, Benson noted that the line, "I enter from Abuja go Gwagwalada", in "Gwagwalada" symbolizes Bnxn's retreat from the chaos of public life to a quieter and safer haven. They praised the track's production as part of the album's standout Afrobeats sound, which features smooth keys, lively guitars, rich basslines, and groove-setting drums. Describing the song as a "hit track", they highlighted its effectiveness in delivering Bnxn's message and enhancing the album's sonic experience.

== Controversy ==
In an interview on the Zero Conditions podcast, fellow Nigerian singer Peruzzi revealed that he and Kizz Daniel had initially recorded a track together titled "Gwagwalada", which was later given to Bnxn. Peruzzi expressed surprise when the song was released without anyone reaching out to him, leading him to decide that he would not be collaborating with Kizz Daniel anytime soon. He stated, "I don't think I am working with him anytime soon... Like right now, I don't want to work with him." This incident caused some tension between the two artists and was a significant moment in the promotion of "Gwagwalada".

== Awards and nominations ==
Awards and nominations for "Gwagwalada"
Organization	Year	Category	Result	Ref.
The Headies	2023	Best Collaboration	Nominated	

== Commercial performance ==
"Gwagwalada" debuted at No. 12 on the Billboard U.S. Afrobeats Songs chart on 4 March 2023.

"Gwagwalada" debuted at No. 45 on the TurnTable Official Nigeria Top 100 chart for the week of 21 February 2023, based on just two days of tracking. The chart, which combines audio and video streams within Nigeria as well as radio and satellite TV airplay, marked the song's first entry on the platform. The following week, "Gwagwalada" surged to No. 1 on the chart for the tracking week ending 7 March 2023. It recorded 3.55 million on-demand streams (No. 1 on streaming) and a radio reach of 46 million (No. 3 on radio). This marked Bnxn's fourth No. 1 entry on the chart, Kizz Daniel's fifth, and Seyi Vibez's first.

The song maintained its No. 1 position for the week ending 15 March 2023, with 3.50 million on-demand streams and 43.7 million in radio reach. This tied it with "Finesse" as Bnxn's second-longest reign at the top of the chart, behind "Feeling." Additionally, Kizz Daniel became the artist with the second-most No. 1 entries on the Official Nigeria Top 100, trailing only Asake.

For the tracking week ending 29 March 2023, "Gwagwalada" was displaced by Adekunle Gold and Zinoleesky's "Party No Dey Stop", which set a new record for the largest total activity by any song in 2023. "Gwagwalada" slipped to No. 2 after a four-week reign at the summit, making it one of the longest-running No. 1 songs of the year to that point.

== Charts ==
=== Weekly charts ===
Chart performance for "Gwagwalada"
Chart (2023)	Peak position
Nigeria (TurnTable Top 100)	1
US Afrobeats Songs (Billboard)	12
UK Afrobeats (Official Charts)	4

=== Year-end charts ===
2022 year-end chart performance for "Gwagwalada"
Chart (2023)	Position
Nigeria (TurnTable)	3
US Afrobeats Songs (Billboard)	47

== Certifications ==
Certifications for "Gwagwalada"
Region	Certification	Certified units/sales
Nigeria (TCSN)	2× Platinum	200,000^{‡}
^{‡} Sales+streaming figures based on certification alone.
