= No Wahala =

Single by 1da Banton

from the album Original Vibe Machine
- Released: 19 July 2021
- Genre: Afrobeats
- Length: 3:07
- Label: Squareball
- Songwriter: Godson Epelle
- Producer: Blaisebeatz

1da Banton singles chronology
"Whine fi Mi" (2019)	"No Wahala" (2021)	"Summer Love" (2022)

Kizz Daniel singles chronology
"Lie" (2021)	"No Wahala" (remix) (2022)	"Buga" (2022)

Tiwa Savage singles chronology
"Coming Home" (2021)	"No Wahala" (remix) (2022)	"All Day" (2022)

Music videos
- "No Wahala" on YouTube; "No Wahala" (remix) on YouTube

"No Wahala" is a song by Nigerian singer-songwriter 1da Banton. It was released on 2 July 2021 by Squareball Entertainment as the lead single from his debut studio album Original Vibe Machine (2021). Written by 1da Banton and produced by Blaisebeatz, the song blew up on TikTok, and peaked at number 15 on the Billboard U.S. Afrobeats Songs chart. Following the success of "No Wahala", Squareball Entertainment issued a remix to the song, featuring new verses from Kizz Daniel and Tiwa Savage, in March 2022. In July 2022, 1da Banton he announced the "No Wahala" European tour.

== Reception and commercial performance ==
"No Wahala" was ranked #25 on Premium Times newspaper's list of the 25 best Nigerian songs of 2021.

The song peaked at number 15 on the Billboard U.S. Afrobeats Songs chart. It also charted on several of Apple Music's Top Songs charts. The song also contributed to 1Da Banton's inclusion on Dataleum's List of Top 10 Nigerian Artistes on YouTube in 2022. On 10 April 2023, it surpassed 100 million streams on Spotify, making it one of the most streamed afrobeat songs on the platform.

== Music video ==
The music video was released on 20 July 2021, and directed by Nigerian veteran cinematographer, Adasa Cookey.

== Charts ==
Chart performance for "No Wahala"
Chart (2022)	Peak position
Suriname (Nationale Top 40)	3

== Release history ==
Region	Date	Format	Label	Ref.
Various	19 July 2021	Digital download; streaming	Squareball Entertainment	
