= EnergyBank =

Nigerian singer-songwriter and producer

Anene JulianPaul, known professionally as EnergyBank, is a Nigerian singer-songwriter and producer.

A native of Anambra State, EnergyBank was born in Lagos State. EnergyBank's debut single "Ife Adigo" featured Fiokee and has gone on to release "Dead President", "Chop Life" and "Heartbeat". EnergyBank cites Jay Z, Usher, Craig David and 50 Cent as an influence in his music style.
