= No Bad Songz =

Studio album by Kizz Daniel
- Released: 30 November 2018
- Genre: Afropop
- Length: 59:15
- Label: Flyboy
- Producers: Pheelz; Jay Pizzle; Philkeyz; Diplo; M.O.G Beatz; Major Bangz; Lussh; Magicsticks; DJ Coublon; Runtinz; Killertunes

Kizz Daniel chronology
New Era (2016)	No Bad Songz (2018)	King of Love (2020)

Singles from No Bad Songz
- 1. "No Do" Released: 1 December 2017; 2. "One Ticket" Released: 2 November 2018; 3. "Madu" Released: 8 February 2019; 4. "Poko" Released: 26 April 2019

No Bad Songz (abbreviated as NBS) is the second studio album by Nigerian singer Kizz Daniel. On November 30, 2018, the singer's indie record label, Flyboy I.N.C., released it. NBS comprises twenty tracks and features guest appearances from Davido, Diplo, Diamond Platnumz, and Sarkodie, among others. The album's production was handled by Pheelz, Jay Pizzle, Philkeyz, Diplo, M.O.G Beatz, Major Bangz, Lussh, Magicsticks, DJ Coublon, Runtinz, and Killertunes.

== Background ==
In December 2017, Kizz Daniel launched his own record label, Flyboy I.N.C., after departing from G-Worldwide Entertainment. In July 2018, he announced the album's title and cover art amid a litigation with G-Worldwide. Earlier that year, it was revealed that he recorded an album called Evolution, which would have been released under G-Worldwide. The cover art for NBS features an image of Kizz Daniel being flanked by an angel and a demon. The album's track list, which is composed of songs that were rearranged, was unveiled on 24 August 2018.

== Singles ==
The Philkeyz-produced track "No Do" was released on 1 December 2017, as the album's lead single. Kizz Daniel released it as his debut single after leaving G-Worldwide. At the time of the song's release, he was still going by Kiss Daniel. The album's second single, "One Ticket", was released on 2 November 2018. It features vocals by Davido and was produced by Major Bangz. The Lussh-produced track "Madu" was released on 8 February 2019, as the album's third single. The accompanying music video for the song was directed by Aje Filmworks and stars actress Beverly Osu. On 26 April 2019, Kizz Daniel released the album's fourth single "Poko", which was produced by M.O.G Beatz. The song's music video was directed by Clarence Peters.

== Critical reception ==
Kizz Daniel's versatility was lauded by The Native's Debola Abimbolu, who also commended guest acts like Nasty C and Wretch 32 for providing a "fresh dimension." Ehis Ohunyon, who reviewed the album for Pulse Nigeria, gave it four stars out of five and praised it for showcasing the singer's artistic and vocal maturity, particularly on songs like "Ghetto" and "Ja". Dennis Peter of Nigerian Entertainment Today characterized the album as a "confident and engaging" body of work that blends "diverse beats with self-assured hooks". Moreover, Peter added that the record was enhanced by Kizz Daniel's performance and the contributions of other artists.

=== Accolades ===
Awards and nominations for No Bad Songz
Organization	Year	Category	Result	Ref.
The Headies	2019	Best R&B/Pop Album	Nominated	
The Headies	2019	Album of the Year	Nominated	

== Track listing ==
No Bad Songz track listing
No.	Title	Writer(s)	Producer(s)	Length
1.	"Gods"	Oluwatobiloba Anidugbe; Ifiok Effanga; Onyishi Nelson	Runtinz; Fiokee	3:00
2.	"No Do"	Anidugbe; Philip Chukwuka	Philkeyz	2:31
3.	"Tere" (featuring Diamond Platnumz)	Anidugbe; Naseeb Juma; Kareem Temitayo	Magicsticks	3:48
4.	"One Ticket" (featuring Davido)	Anidugbe; David Adeleke; Michael Archibong	Major Bangz	3:28
5.	"Oyibe"	Anidugbe; Otaniyen-Uwa Daniel	Killertunes	2:22
6.	"Time No Dey"	Anidugbe; Temitayo	Magicsticks	2:49
7.	"Maye"	Anidugbe	DJ Coublon	3:07
8.	"Bad" (featuring Wretch 32)	Anidugbe; Jermaine Scott; Archibong	Major Bangz	3:11
9.	"Ghetto" (featuring Nasty C)	Anidugbe; Nsikayesizwe Ngcobo; Chukwuka	Philkeyz	2:48
10.	"Somebody Dey" (featuring DJ Xclusive and Demmie Vee)	Anidugbe; Rotimi Alakija; Ademola Awotungase; Daniel	Killertunes	2:44
11.	"Ayee"	Anidugbe; Ayotunde Tundaylawal	Lussh	3:21
12.	"Happy"	Anidugbe; Phillip Moses	Pheelz	2:44
13.	"Ja"	Anidugbe; Akwuba Ugochukwu	DJ Coublon	2:23
14.	"Madu"	Anidugbe; Tundaylawal	Lussh	2:41
15.	"Poko"	Anidugbe; John Dosunmu-Mensah	M.O.G Beatz	2:49
16.	"Ikwe" (featuring Diplo)	Anidugbe; Maxime Picard; Clément Picard; Thomas Pentz; Joshua Osajiokwoeh	Diplo; Jay Pizzle	2:54
17.	"Nesesari" (featuring Philkeyz)	Anidugbe; Chukwuka	Philkeyz	2:58
18.	"Over"	Anidugbe; Akwuba	DJ Coublon	3:13
19.	"Kojo" (featuring Sarkodie)	Anidugbe; Michael Addo	Philkeyz	3:24
20.	"Tobi"	Anidugbe; Akwuba	DJ Coublon	2:51
Total length:				59:15

== Personnel ==
Production and engineering

- Runtinz – production (track 1)
- Philkeyz – production (tracks 2, 9, 17, 19)
- Magicsticks – production (tracks 3, 6)
- Major Bangz – production (tracks 4, 8)
- Killertunes – production (tracks 5, 10)
- DJ Coublon – production (tracks 7, 13, 18, 20)
- Lussh – production (tracks 11, 14)
- Pheelz – production (track 12)
- M.O.G Beatz – production (track 15)
- Jay Pizzle – production (track 16)
- Diplo – production (track 16)
- Swaps – mixing, mastering (tracks 1, 3, 4, 5, 6, 7, 8, 9, 10, 12, 13, 18, 19, 20)
- Smyle – mixing, mastering (tracks 2, 17)
- STG – mixing, mastering (track 11)
- Suka Sounds – mixing, mastering (track 14)
- Zeeno Foster – mixing, mastering (track 15)
- Ricky – mixing, mastering (track 15)

== Release history ==
Release history and formats for No Bad Songz
Region	Date	Format	Label
Worldwide	30 November 2018	Streaming; digital download	Flyboy
United Kingdom	14 December 2018	CD	Flyboy
