= RTID (Rich Till I Die) =

Single by Kizz Daniel

from the album Maverick
- Released: 6 January 2023
- Recorded: 2022
- Genre: Afrobeats; Afro pop
- Length: 2:52
- Label: Flyboy; Empire
- Songwriter: Oluwatobiloba Daniel Anidugbe
- Producers: Reward Beatz; Blaisebeatz

Kizz Daniel singles chronology
"Cough (Odo)" (2022)	"RTID (Rich Till I Die)" (2023)	"Gwagwalada" (2023)

Music video
- "RTID (Rich Till I Die)" on YouTube

"RTID" ("Rich Till I Die") is a song by Nigerian singer Kizz Daniel. It was released on 6 January 2023, through Flyboy I.N.C and Empire Distribution as the fourth single from his fourth studio album Maverick (2023). The song was produced by Reward Beatz and Blaisebeatz.

== Background ==
Kizz Daniel previewed the song on 10 September 2022 alongside a tweet that stated one of the lines of the song: "No matter the matter, I'll be rich till I die".

== Reception ==
Adegboyega Adeleye of Vanguard praised "RTID" for its melodic and motivational qualities, describing it as "a didactic and message-filled single." In his opinion, the TG Omori-directed visuals highlighted Kizz Daniel's gratitude to God and resilience in the face of life's challenges, complemented by a celebratory theme and the artist's confident outlook on success. Adeleye noted the song's "sonorous lyrical delivery and melodious chorus," enhanced by explosive instrumentals and the uplifting Christian "Hallelujah" chant, portraying it as an inspiring start to the year.

In a review of Daniel's fourth studio album Maverick for Afrocritik, Patrick Ezema expressed dissatisfaction with "RTID", stating that the song 'fails to inspire,' particularly as part of the album's second half, which he described as suffering from poor song arrangement and a decline in sonic quality.

== Composition and lyrics ==
"RTID" was produced by Reward Beatz and co-produced by Blaisebeatz. The song features lyrics rooted in proverbs and wise sayings, reflecting Kizz Daniel's gratitude, hard work, and resilience. The chorus is prayerful and introspective, capturing themes of perseverance and hope. In the song, Kizz Daniel acknowledges life's struggles through the local slang, "Suffer suffer for the earth, enjoy for heaven," and emphasizes his commitment to "living the life he loves and loving the life that he lives." Additionally, the song addresses themes of love and hate, symbolized by the advice to "wear a face mask," a metaphor for ignoring negativity.

== Music video ==
The music video for "RTID" was released the same day of the song. It was directed by TG Omori, and reached 1.7 million views of YouTube three days after its release.

== Commercial performance ==
"RTID" debuted at No. 2 on the Official Nigeria Top 100 during the chart week of January 13–19, 2023. This marked the highest debut of the week and continued Kizz Daniel's streak of top-charting releases since 2021. In its debut week, the song accumulated 70.8 million in radio reach (No. 2 on radio) and 2.71 million on-demand streams (No. 3 on streaming). In its second week, the song maintained its position at No. 2, holding a narrow lead over Omah Lay's "Soso", which had 2.75 million streams (No. 2 on streaming) compared to "RTID"'s 2.71 million. During the same period, the song recorded a slightly lower radio reach of 70.8 million, ranking No. 2 on the radio chart. By the chart week of January 27–February 2, 2023, "RTID" slipped to No. 3 as it was surpassed by Ruger's "Asiwaju" and Omah Lay's "Soso". Despite the drop, it remained a strong performer in both streaming and airplay, solidifying its place as one of the standout hits of early 2023.

== Awards and nominations ==
Year	Awards ceremony	Award description(s)	Results
2023	African Entertainment Awards USA	Best Music Video	Nominated

== Charts ==
=== Weekly charts ===
Chart performance for "RTID (Rich Till I Die)"
Chart (2022)	Peak position
Nigeria (TurnTable Top 100)	2
UK Afrobeats Singles (OCC)	12

== Certifications ==
Certifications for "RTID (Rich Till I Die)"
Region	Certification	Certified units/sales
Nigeria (TCSN)	Platinum	100,000^{‡}
^{‡} Sales+streaming figures based on certification alone.
