= Woju =

Woju may refer to:

- "Woju" (song), a 2014 Nigerian Afropop song by Kiss Daniel
- Okjeo, a Korean tribal state from roughly the 2nd century BC to the 5th century AD, known as Woju in Chinese
- Celtuce, a lettuce cultivar known as woju in Chinese
- Dwelling Narrowness, a 2009 Chinese television series, known as Woju in Chinese
