= The Parlour Wife =

2024 novel by Foluso Agbaje

- Author: Foluso Agbaje
- Language: English
- Genre: Historical fiction
- Publisher: One More Chapter
- Publication date: 2024
- Publication place: Nigeria
- Media type: Print

The Parlour Wife is a 2024 historical novel by Nigerian writer Foluso Agbaje. Published by One More Chapter, an imprint of HarperCollins, the novel is set in colonial-era Lagos and follows a young woman navigating marriage, family expectations and changing social realities. It is Agbaje's debut novel.

== Background and publication ==
The Parlour Wife is Foluso Agbaje's debut novel. In 2023, One More Chapter, an imprint of HarperCollins, acquired UK and Commonwealth rights to the novel as part of a two-book deal.

Set in colonial Lagos, the novel explores the experiences of a young woman negotiating marriage, family expectations and social change in twentieth-century Nigeria.

== Reception ==
Reviewing the novel for Culture Custodian, Shalom Tewobola described it as "an ode to women battling for selfhood", commending Agbaje's portrayal of female agency and her depiction of the tensions between tradition and personal autonomy.

Writing for Afrocritik, Evidence Egwuono Adjarho praised the novel's depiction of colonial Lagos, describing it as an accomplished debut that combines historical detail with an emotionally engaging narrative. He also highlighted Agbaje's treatment of patriarchy, marriage and class, while noting that some aspects of the narrative could have been developed further.

In a review for Littafi, the novel was praised for its immersive historical setting, nuanced characters and accessible prose, with the reviewer describing it as a compelling work of historical fiction centred on the experiences of women in colonial Nigeria.
