= Cough (Odo) =

2022 single by Kizz Daniel

Single by Kizz Daniel

from the album Maverick and Where We Come From, Vol. 01
- Released: 14 October 2022
- Genre: Afro pop
- Length: 3:03
- Label: Flyboy; Empire
- Songwriter: Oluwatobiloba Daniel Anidugbe
- Producers: Philkeyz; Blaisebeatz

Kizz Daniel singles chronology
"Buga" (2022)	"Cough (Odo)" (2022)	"RTID (Rich Till I Die)" (2023)

Music video
- "Cough (Odo)" on YouTube

"Cough (Odo)", or just "Cough", is a song by Nigerian singer Kizz Daniel. Produced by Philkeyz and Blaisebeatz, the song was released on 14 October 2022 by Flyboy I.N.C and Empire Distribution as the lead single from the Empire Distribution compilation album Where We Come From, Vol. 01 (2022), and the third single from Kizz Daniel's fourth studio album Maverick (2023). A remix of the song featuring American singer Becky G was released on 21 July 2023.

== Background ==
On 12 April 2022, Kizz Daniel previewed "Cough (Odo)" on Twitter, writing that fans who said "if I cough we will buy" should now support the release, as he had "literally coughed" on the track. He released the song on 14 October 2022, the same day Empire Distribution announced their compilation album Where We Come From, Vol. 01.

Kizz Daniel said he titled the song "Cough (Odo)" as a tribute to his Ghanaian audience, taking inspiration from the Twi word "ɔdɔ", meaning "love". In an interview with Lexis Bill on Joy FM, he explained that the decision was influenced by the success of his previous single "Buga" in Ghana, where it remained at number one longer than in any other African country.

== Critical reception ==
Emmanuel Esomnofu, writing for The Native, described "Cough (Odo)" as a "hit-sounding record", praising Blaisebeatz's bright production and Kizz Daniel's "effervescent desire". He wrote that the song possesses "all the saccharine qualities of a hit record" and concluded that it further demonstrated Kizz Daniel's strengths as a songwriter and "genius hitmaker". Reviewing the Maverick album, tooXclusive's Tyler Duncan said the song has a "catchy chorus" and was "upbeat, joyful, and perfectly expresses what it's like to wow a stranger."

== Composition and lyrics ==
"Cough (Odo)" is built around sunny synths and upbeat percussion over a production by Blaisebeatz. Lyrically, the song centres on romance and devotion, with Kizz Daniel expressing his desire to love a woman and fulfil her wishes.

== Music video ==
The music video for "Cough (Odo)" was released on 16 December 2022. It was directed by Director K.

== Commercial performance ==
Kizz Daniel's "Cough (Odo)" debuted at No. 1 on the TurnTable Top 100 chart during its first week of release, marking his fourth No. 1 entry. The song set a record with 10.5 million streams and 70.2 million in radio plays, achieving the largest streaming week tally in Nigeria at the time. It also became only the second song ever to debut at No. 1 on every available platform in Nigeria, joining Davido's "Fem". The track continued its success, remaining at No. 1 for two consecutive weeks, surpassing Fireboy DML and Asake's "Bandana" for the largest radio reach, with 76.6 million in radio plays in its second week. Despite not having an official video at the time of its release, it quickly gained traction across various platforms, reaching No. 4 and No. 5 on YouTube's audio and visualizer charts.

== Accolades ==
Year	Awards ceremony	Award description(s)	Results
2023	African Entertainment Awards USA	Song of the Year	Nominated
2023	Trace Awards & Festival	Song of the Year	Nominated

== Charts ==
=== Weekly charts ===
Chart performance for "Cough (Odo)"
Chart (2022)	Peak position
Nigeria (TurnTable Top 100)	1
Global Excl. US (Billboard)	138
US Afrobeats Songs (Billboard)	8
UK Afrobeats (Official Charts)	4

=== Year-end charts ===
2022 year-end chart performance for "Cough (Odo)"
Chart (2022)	Position
Nigeria (TurnTable)	24
US Afrobeats Songs (Billboard)	73

== Remix ==
"Cough (Remix)"

Single by Kizz Daniel featuring Becky G

from the album Maverick
- Released: 21 July 2023
- Studio: Just for the Record (Sun Valley, CA)
- Genre: Afro pop
- Length: 2:57
- Label: Flyboy; Empire
- Songwriters: Oluwatobiloba Daniel Anidugbe; Rebbeca Marie Gomez
- Producers: Philkeyz; Blaisebeatz

Kizz Daniel singles chronology
"Shu-Peru" (2023)	"Cough (Remix)" (2023)	"My G" (2023)

Becky G singles chronology
"La Nena" (2023)	"Cough (Remix)" (2023)	"Coming Your Way" (2023)

Lyric video
- "Cough (Remix)" on YouTube

A remix of "Cough (Odo)" was released on 21 July 2023 that features Becky G.
