= Gabiro Guitar =

Rwandan songwriter

Gabiro Girishyaka Gilbert, popularly known by his stage name Gabiro(/ɡɑːbɪroʊ/) Guitar (born 17 October, 1988) in Gikondo Kicukiro District, is a Rwandan singer, songwriter and guitarist .

== Early life and education ==
He grew up in a family of 7 where he happened to be the 6th. At the Age of 14 he started joining the Church Choir as leading singer and Guitarist then he later started writing songs for the Choir.

He obtained in 2014 a bachelor's degree in computer sciences from Kigali Independent University

== Career ==
He started his music career in 2010. He nominated in East Africa Music competition called Tusker Project Fame. He released album featured Fiokee, Dream Boys, Bushali, Grey C. He is well known for his first Album. In 2020 Gabiro released song called Igikwe featured Confy. He became Skol Pulse Beer Brand Ambassador 2022.

He shared the same stage with Adekunle Gold, Ruger, Ycee, AV, Ykee Benda, and 2Face Idibia.

=== Studio albums ===
- Criminal Love (2021)
- "Girishyaka" (2022)
