= Double (Kizz Daniel song) =

Single by Kizz Daniel
- Language: English
- Released: May 31, 2024
- Genre: Afrobeat
- Length: 2:48
- Label: Flyboy I.N.C.
- Songwriters: Min Seok Kim; Oluwatobiloba Sikiru Anidugbe
- Producer: Ayzed

Kizz Daniel singles chronology
"Twe Twe" (2024)	"Double" (2024)	"My Dealer (Remix)" (2024)

Music video
- "Double" on YouTube

"Double" is a song recorded by Nigerian singer Kizz Daniel. The song samples from the song "Baby Shark" and was dedicated to his wife.

== Composition ==
"Double" has been described as a "signature blend of afrobeat rhythms, infectious choruses and soulful melodies, while creating a vibrant and romantic anthem."

== Music video ==
A music video was published on May 31, 2024. It was filmed by TG Omori, in Lagos.

== Personnel ==
Credits adapted from Apple Music.

Musicians

- Kizz Daniel – performer

Technical

- Min Seok Kim – songwriter
- Oluwatobiloba Sikiru Anidugbe – songwriter
- Ayzed – producer, recording engineer
- Timi Jay – mixing engineer, mastering engineer
- Nick Cavalieri – engineer

== Charts ==
Weekly chart performance for "Double"
Chart (2024)	Peak position
Nigeria (TurnTable Top 100)	2
