= Fvck You =

Single by Kizz Daniel

from the album King of Love
- Released: 15 March 2019
- Genre: Afrobeats
- Length: 3:51
- Label: Flyboy
- Songwriters: Oluwatobiloba Daniel Anidugbe; John Saviours Udomboso
- Producer: Young Jonn

Kizz Daniel singles chronology
"Madu" (2019)	"Fvck You" (2019)	"Eko" (2019)

"Fvck You" is a song by Nigerian singer Kizz Daniel. Released on 15 March 2019, the song served as the lead single from his third studio album King of Love (2020), and was produced and co-written by Young Jonn. The song went viral after an open-verse challenge with many different African artists participating such as Tiwa Savage, Seyi Shay, Simi, Falz, Wyclef Jean, Pasuma, Ruggedman, and Sound Sultan, among others.

== Background ==
"Fvck You" was released to promote Kizz Daniel's (at the time) upcoming London tour at the O2 Arena. Additionally, the song served as a follow-up to his hit single "Madu" off No Bad Songz (2018), his second studio album, and was the lead single off King of Love (2020), his third studio album.

== Viral open-verse challenge ==
After the release of "Fvck You," the song increased in popularity due to an open-verse challenge involving a variety of artists who participated. Artists like Tiwa Savage, Seyi Shay, Simi, Vector, Lil Kesh, CDQ, Blaqbonez, Sarkodie, Falz, Flyboy I.N.C label signee Demmie Vee, and even the producer himself Young Jonn participated, among other non-mainstream artists.

A similar thing happened with Nigerian rapper Olamide's 2016 hit single "Who You Epp?," with artists like Wande Coal, Phyno, and Reminisce participating in the challenge.

=== Controversies ===
Nigerian singer Tiwa Savage, released her "Fvck You" cover on 28 March 2019. Fans speculated that the cover was a diss to her ex-husband Tunji "Tee Billz" Balogun or Nigerian musician Wizkid, in which, Tiwa later denied the rumours.

Simi's cover of "Fvck You" drew controversy over a Yoruba lyric that many listeners viewed as offensive. She used the line "Do you think I have tribal marks?" which is a common Yoruba expression that means "Do you think I am stupid?". Some critics, including model Adetutu OJ, said the lyric implied that people with tribal marks were unintelligent. Simi later apologized, said the line was insensitive, and expressed regret. She deleted the original post, revised the lyrics, and called for greater sensitivity toward others.

== Music and lyrics ==
The lyrics of "Fvck You" depict a strained relationship in which the narrator, Kizz Daniel, reacts to discovering that his lover is involved with other men. The song is framed by feelings of resentment and disappointment, with Daniel criticizing her choices through blunt and confrontational language. At the same time, he acknowledges his own role in the situation, notably in the line "Shebi na me dey find Sisi yellow," which suggests an awareness of his position in the relationship. The narrative contrasts Daniel's bitterness with the lover's apparent indifference, as she continues her life unaffected by his anger.

== Reception ==
Wilfred Okiche, writing for YNaija, said "Fvck You" centered on "sex, infidelity and the bitter dissolution of a romantic relationship." He acknowledged that Kizz Daniel departed from his "fresh, wholesome image," relying on "name calling" and frequent profanity to heighten the song's impact. Okiche wrote that while its subject matter was familiar and at times "potentially problematic," Daniel's emotive delivery and an "unusual promotion strategy" helped the song connect widely and gain traction online.

== Track listing ==
1. "Fvck You" – 3:51
2. "Fvck You" (clean version) – 3:51

== Personnel ==
Credits adapted from Apple Music.

- Oluwatobiloba Daniel Anidugbe – vocals, songwriter
- John Saviours Udomboso - producer, songwriter, arranger

== Release history ==
Release history and formats for "Fvck You"
Region	Date	Format	Label
Various	15 March 2019	Streaming; digital download	Flyboy
