= Shu-Peru =

Single by Kizz Daniel

from the album Maverick
- Released: 12 May 2023
- Genre: Afrobeat; Afro pop; R&B
- Length: 2:19
- Label: Flyboy; Empire
- Songwriters: Oluwatobiloba Daniel Anidugbe; Joseph Watchorn; John Ighodaro
- Producers: Reward Beatz; Roc Legion

Kizz Daniel singles chronology
"Gwagwalada" (2023)	"Shu-Peru" (2023)	"Cough (Remix)" (2023)

Music video
- "Shu-Peru" on YouTube

"Shu-Peru" is a song by Nigerian singer Kizz Daniel. It was released on 12 May 2023, as the fifth single off his fourth studio album Maverick (2023). The song was produced by Reward Beatz and Roc Legion.

== Reception and controversy ==
"Shu-Peru" received mixed reception from fans and critics. On Twitter, some listeners criticized the song for its simplistic lyrics, contrasting it with his earlier works "Sin City" and "Laye". The phrase itself "shuperu" was originally popularized by Orezi in his 2014 song of the same name, which led to accusations of unoriginality and sparked debates about the creativity behind the song's title and lyrics. On the contrary, listeners defended Kizz Daniel, pointing out that the song is meant to be fun and light-hearted, and that similar themes and simplicity are common in modern Afrobeats songs.

== Music video ==
The TG Omori-directed music video was released later the day of the song's release.

== Charts ==
=== Weekly charts ===
Chart performance for "Shu-Peru"
Chart (2023)	Peak position
Nigeria (TurnTable Top 100)	2
UK Afrobeats (Official Charts)	13

=== Year-end charts ===
2023 year-end chart performance for "Shu-Peru"
Chart (2023)	Position
TurnTable End of the Year Top 100 of 2023	47

== Personnel ==
Credits adapted from Apple Music.

- Oluwatobiloba Daniel Anidugbe – vocals, songwriter
- Reward Beatz - production
- Roc Legion - production
- Jaycen Joshua - mixing engineer, recording engineer

== Release history ==
Release history and formats for "Shu-Peru"
Region	Date	Format	Label
Various	12 May 2023	Streaming; digital download	Flyboy; Empire
