= Kelvyn Colt =

German musician

Kelvyn Benbella Ajala (born January 23, 1994, in Fulda, Hesse) is known by his stage name Kelvyn Colt. He is a German rapper.

== Life ==
Colt was born in 1994 as Kelvyn Benbella Ajala in Fulda, Hesse, Germany. In 2000, his family moved to Wiesbaden.

Colt had his first casting in the role of Romeo in the KiKa television series "Romeo feat. Juliette" in 2014.

== Career ==
=== 2015-2016: First independent releases ===
In 2015, Colt released his first independent tracks, "Narcotic" and "Traded For You," which caught the attention of the YouTube platform Colors, founded around the same time. In collaboration with Colors, he performed a freestyle to Hucci & Stooki Sounds' "Ball So Hard" on the channel, which became the first viral hit in Germany, with over 2 million views, bringing both Colors and Colt significant attention. This helped establish Colt as an artist on various music platforms, including Vice's Noisey, which referred to him as "our new hope in hip-hop", and the German Vogue, which described Colt as the "future of hip-hop".

=== 2016-2020: Collaboration with Sony Music Germany ===
In December 2016, Colt signed his contract with Four Music, a subsidiary of Sony Music Germany. After sold-out shows in London, Colt began traveling between Berlin, London, Paris, and Los Angeles for recording sessions, gigs, and shoots. He toured with hip-hop colleagues such as RIN, Gashi, Ocean Wisdom, and Chase Atlantic.

In 2017, Colt released his first project with Sony, the five-track EP "LH914," named after the one-way ticket he arrived in London with a few years prior. Colt then performed "Bury Me Alive" in his second collaboration with the music platform Colors, leading the track to become a viral hit with several million views in the first weeks after its release. In 2019, his song "Bury Me Alive" appeared on the soundtrack of the Netflix series "Wu Assassins," reaching the top of the American Shazam trend charts.

Colt released another EP titled "Mind of Colt, Pt. 1" under Sony Music Germany in 2018 and two singles in 2019. His European tour in the same year was sold out. He also performed at the annual established arts and media event SXSW and became the first German rap artist to tour China.

=== 2020-present: Independent career with TBHG Records ===
In early 2020, Colt parted ways with Sony after securing the rights to his entire music catalog to establish his own independent record label. In September 2020, Colt announced his collaboration with Mercedes-Benz and became the face of the "EQC" project. As part of the collaboration, the single "BENZ | I Know" was released, which remains Colt's most well-known single to date<. The accompanying video was released on the Mercedes-Benz YouTube channel.

In 2021, Colt independently released his first EP, "Love Before Death". He also released the collaborative single "No One" with wavvyboi, which brought attention to the breaking of traditional gender roles in society through collaboration with About You and Levi's. Another song, "Emotions", was released in the same year.

After releasing three standalone singles, "INTO THE LIGHT," "Hot Girl Summer," and "Problem, Yeah I Know," in 2022, Colt started off 2023 with the release of his new EP "GERMAN ANGST," which garnered media attention through a protest march for mental health in Berlin. In May 2023, Colt appeared as a guest on the ZDFNeo show "Studio Schmitt," where he discussed his career path, cultural differences in international hip-hop, and his experiences in the music industry, while also premiering his single "RAGE" on German television. In July 2023, Kelvyn Colt also appeared on the ARD show "ttt – titel, thesen, temperamente," where he reflected on his career and discussed the societal influences of "GERMAN ANGST". In the same year, Colt began a collaboration with US based distribution and publishing company Create Music Group, through which he released the singles "RAGE" and "ENORMOUS" in joint collaboration.

== Discography ==
=== EPs and Mixtapes ===
- 2017: LH914
- 2018: Mind of Colt, Pt 1.
- 2021: Love Before Death
- 2023: GERMAN ANGST

=== Singles ===
- 2015: Narcotic
- 2016: Traded for You
- 2017: I Got This (feat. Merty Shango)
- 2017: Bury Me Alive
- 2017: Under My Skin
- 2017: Bad Man
- 2017: Moon
- 2018: Blessed
- 2018: Just Watch Me
- 2018: Legend
- 2018: Mama
- 2018: Waited on Me
- 2018: Love & Hate
- 2018: Weakend
- 2018: Aqua (feat. Elijah Hook)
- 2018: Alone
- 2019: Down Like Dah
- 2019: Mama (Live)
- 2019: WDWGFH
- 2019: Savage
- 2019: Bury Me Alive – A COLORS SHOW
- 2019: Mile Away
- 2020: DLMD
- 2020: Once Again
- 2020: 4 Am Mein Block
- 2020: Walk Alone
- 2020: Good Morning (Remix)
- 2020: Taking You Home
- 2020: Hope I Wonder
- 2020: Benz I Know
- 2020: BENZ I Know REMIX (feat. GASHI)
- 2020: LINK UP
- 2020: GIVE ME A SIGN
- 2021: Fire in the Booth, Pt. 1
- 2021: Rapunzel
- 2021: Matrix
- 2021: Say Cheese
- 2021: No One (feat. wavvyboi)
- 2021: Emotions
- 2022: Désole (feat. Jok'Air)
- 2022: INTO THE LIGHT
- 2022: Hot Girl Summer
- 2022: Problem, Yeah I Know
- 2023: EYE4EYE
- 2023: SHORTY!
- 2023: Memories (mit ToTheMoon)
- 2023: RAGE
- 2023: ENORMOUS
