= King of Love =

Studio album by Kizz Daniel
- Released: 25 June 2020
- Genre: Afro pop
- Length: 47:41
- Language: Yoruba; English; Nigerian Pidgin
- Label: Flyboy
- Producer: Major Bangz; Tee-Y Mix; Selebobo; ATG Musick; Lussh; Runtinz; Philkeyz; Sugarboy; DJ Coublon; Young Jonn; Teflon Zincfence; Krizbeatz; One Sound; KD Tha Great; Fancy; Qase Beatz

Kizz Daniel chronology
No Bad Songz (2018)	King of Love (2020)	Barnabas (2021)

Singles from King of Love
- 1. "Fvck You" Released: 15 March 2019; 2. "Pak 'n' Go" Released: 4 October 2019; 3. "Jaho" Released: 15 December 2019; 4. "Boys Are Bad" Released: 25 November 2020

King of Love is the third studio album by Nigerian singer Kizz Daniel released on 25 June 2020 through Flyboy I.N.C.

== Background, concept and themes ==
Announced through his Instagram page, the album was initially teased to have five tracks and a different cover art. According to Kizz Daniel, King of Love is centered on love ranging from romantic relationships to deeper emotional connections. In an interview with Nigerian music magazine, NotJustOk, he expressed that the album's primary aim is to spread love across the world through his music.

== Singles ==
The album's lead single "Fvck You" was released on 15 March 2019. The song was produced by Young Jonn, and it gained significant traction from an open-verse challenge with artists like Tiwa Savage, Seyi Shay, Ruggedman, Falz, Simi, Pasuma, Sound Sultan, and Wyclef Jean, among others participating. The song explores themes of betrayal, bitterness, and toxic relationships. Daniel sings about feeling hurt because he's not his partner's first choice, expressing frustration and slut-shaming her for her decisions. While the song reflects real-life situations, it has been critiqued for potentially reinforcing negative societal attitudes toward women and consent. The second single "Pak 'n' Go" was released on 4 October 2019 and was produced by DJ Coublon. It explores themes of dissatisfaction in relationships, where men are encouraged to leave women who ask for more than they receive. The lyrics have been criticized for reinforcing patriarchal attitudes, especially with lines suggesting a woman's worth is tied to her marriageability. While Kizz Daniel claims the song is meant to "empower under-appreciated lovers," the article argues that the lyrics do the opposite, diminishing women rather than uplifting anyone. The third single "Jaho" was released on 15 December 2019 and was also produced by Coublon. The fourth single "Boys Are Bad" was released on 25 November 2020. It arrived with an Aje Filmworks-directed video and was produced by Philkeyz and DJ Coublon.

== Critical reception ==
Professional ratings
Review scores
Source	Rating
Pulse Nigeria	8.0/10

Motolani Alake of Pulse Nigeria gave King of Love a 8.0/10, praising it as "the best Afro-pop album that Nigerian music has seen in 2020", and highlighting Kizz Daniel's creative songwriting and resonant storytelling. Emmanuel Esomnofu, writing for NotJustOk commended King of Love as a great project and "already one of the best Afro Pop offerings of the year."

== Track listing ==
King of Love track listing
No.	Title	Writer(s)	Producer(s)	Length
1.	"Jaho"	Oluwatobiloba Anidugbe; Akwuba Ugochukwu	DJ Coublon	2:59
2.	"Ada"	Anidugbe; Ugochukwu; John Udomboso	DJ Coublon; Young Jonn	2:29
3.	"Boys Are Bad"	Anidugbe; Ugochukwu; Philip Chukwuka	DJ Coublon; Philkeyz	2:17
4.	"We Wan Comot"	Anidugbe	Krizbeatz	2:04
5.	"Aii"	Anidugbe	Krizbeatz	2:35
6.	"Pak 'n' Go"	Anidugbe; Ugochukwu	DJ Coublon	2:40
7.	"Need Somebody"	Anidugbe; Michael Archibong	Major Bangz; Tee-Y Mix	3:14
8.	"Tempted to Steal"	Anidugbe	One Sound	2:47
9.	"Chek"	Anidugbe; Udoka Oku	Selebobo	3:06
10.	"Yapa"	Anidugbe	Qase Beatz	2:34
11.	"Fvck You" (bonus track)	Anidugbe; Udomboso	Young Jonn	3:51
12.	"One Day"	Anidugbe	Krizbeatz	2:33
13.	"Find a Bae"	Anidugbe; Alexander The Great; Kayla George	ATG Musick	2:46
14.	"Padi"	Anidugbe; Onyishi Nelson	Runtinz	2:44
15.	"Chana"	Anidugbe; Romaine Arnett	KD Tha Great; Teflon Zincfence	3:29
16.	"Pipa"	Anidugbe; Chris Sunday	Krizbeatz	2:50
17.	"Hook"	Anidugbe; One Sound	One Sound; Lussh; Sugarboy; Fancy	2:36
Total length:				47:41

== Release history ==
Release history and formats for King of Love
Region	Date	Format	Label
Nigeria	25 June 2020	Streaming; digital download	Flyboy I.N.C
