= Woju (song) =

2014 single by Kizz Daniel

Single by Kiss Daniel

from the album New Era
- Written: 2012
- Released: 1 September 2014
- Recorded: 2014
- Genre: Afropop; highlife
- Length: 3:24
- Label: G-Worldwide
- Songwriter: Oluwatobiloba Daniel Anidugbe
- Producer: DJ Coublon

Kiss Daniel singles chronology
"Shoye" and "Chidioke" (2014)	"Woju" (2014)	"Laye" (2015)

Music video
- "Woju" on YouTube

"Woju" is a song by Nigerian singer Kiss Daniel, released on 1 September 2014 through G-Worldwide Entertainment. Dubbed as "one of the best Nigerian songs of 2014", the song went on to be nominated in the Hottest Single of the Year category at the 2015 edition of the Nigeria Entertainment Awards. Upon release, "Woju" was met with positive reviews from music critics and also received numerous airplay. The music video for "Woju" peaked at number one on MTV Base's Official Naija Top 10 music video chart for six weeks, and is regarded as the platform through which Kiss Daniel's music career hit the limelight. In February 2015, Kiss Daniel performed an acoustic rendition of the song on Ndani Sessions.

== Background and composition ==
"Woju" was written several years before its release. Kiss Daniel said he wrote the song while he was still in school, about three years before it was officially recorded and released. He added that the song was recorded only a few months before its release, despite being written earlier. He said the idea came from listening to good music and trying to create something better, sometimes forming melodies mentally before recording. Kiss Daniel told Blueprint that "Woju" is a love song centered on a typical African woman. He said the lyrics focus on women responding to excessive compliments by playing hard to get, while advising men to respond by being less available. Kiss Daniel also explained that the title, "Woju", is a Yoruba word that means "recognize," though it can literally translate to "look at me." He said the meaning relates to seeking recognition through attention.

Musically, the song is a mid-tempo highlife and pop track. It features live guitar instrumentation played by Nigerian guitarist Fiokee. Kiss Daniel later recalled that some people initially doubted the song's potential for success, telling him it would not gain attention. He said these reactions came before the song became widely popular. He also reiterated in later interviews that the song was inspired by good music and African sounds, stating that listening to music often influenced his songwriting process.

== Critical reception ==
David Drake of Complex named "Woju" one of the "biggest records in Nigeria". "Woju" was ranked #8 on Daily Post's list of the top 10 songs of 2014. An unnamed writer for the publication described it as a "mid tempo high-life track that appealed to every audience," and concluded that "with witty lyrics and a sing along feel, 'Woju' goes down as one of the best songs for the year."

=== Accolades ===
Year	Award ceremony	Prize	Result	Ref
2015	Nigeria Entertainment Awards	Hottest Single of the Year	Nominated	
2015	The Headies	Best Pop Single	Nominated	
2015	The Headies	Song of the Year	Nominated	
2015	City People Entertainment Awards	Popular Song of the Year	Nominated	
2015	All Africa Music Awards	Most Promising Artist (Kiss Daniel for "Woju")	Won	
2015	All Africa Music Awards	Revelation of the Year (Kiss Daniel for "Woju")	Nominated	
2015	COSON Song Awards	Best Song in Melody	Won	
2015	COSON Song Awards	Hottest Song on the Street	Nominated	

== Covers ==
"Woju" was remixed and covered by several artistes in Nigeria. A freestyle version recorded by 2Face Idibia leaked online in February 2015.

No.	Title	Writer(s)	Length
1.	"Woju (Freestyle)"	2Face Idibia	3:29
2.	"Woju (Guitar version)"	Fiokee	3:26
3.	"Woju (cover)"	Mz Kiss	3:08
4.	"Woju (Calabar cover)"	Brandon	3:26

== Woju (Remix) ==
"Woju (Remix)"

Remix by Kiss Daniel featuring Tiwa Savage and Davido
- Released: 28 February 2015
- Recorded: December 2014
- Genre: Afropop; highlife
- Length: 3:26
- Label: G-Worldwide
- Songwriters: Oluwatobiloba Daniel Anidugbe; Tiwatope Omolara Savage; David Adedeji Adeleke
- Producer: DJ Coublon

Tiwa Savage chronology
"Gbemileke (Remix)" (2015)	"Woju (Remix)" (2015)	"Just Incase" (2015)

Davido chronology
"Twatoba" (2015)	"Woju (Remix)" (2015)	"So Nice" (2015)

Music video
- "Woju (Remix)" on YouTube

The official remix to "Woju" features guest vocals from Nigerian singers Tiwa Savage and Davido. The song was released on 28 February 2015 under G-Worldwide Entertainment, and was produced by DJ Coublon. "Woju (Remix)" made history on MTV Base's Official Naija Top 10 music video chart alongside "Woju" as the first time an original song and its remix would peak at the first and second spots.

=== Background ===
Following the success of the original "Woju", Kiss Daniel returned to the studio to record a remix of the song. He chose to remix the track once it gained heavy airplay and attention across Nigeria. The remix was created to add new elements to the song and expand its reach. Kiss Daniel recorded the remix with Nigerian singer Davido, who added vocals to the track during a studio session in December 2014. Reports later confirmed that the remix would also feature Tiwa Savage. The remix was scheduled for release in early 2015, several months after the original version was released on 1 September 2014. In January 2015, Kiss Daniel publicly confirmed Davido and Tiwa Savage as the featured artists on the remix. He described the collaboration as a major step following the success of the original song.

=== Critical reception ===
The release of "Woju (Remix)" was met with mixed reactions from fans and music critics. Henry Chibuzor of 360Nobs labelled the song "bland, unimproved and surplus to requirement" and further went on to state, "the original 'Woju' is on some astronomical shit, and should have been left on that musical high." tooXclusive's Jim Donnett also voiced his displeasure about the song by stating that, “Woju Remix is perhaps the result of forcing something that you already know wasn’t meant to be”.

=== Music video ===
The music video for "Woju (Remix)" was shot in Lagos, Nigeria by Adasa Cookey. The video was uploaded onto video-sharing website YouTube on 11 March 2015. Authors for tooXclusive shared their opinion on the video; Jim Donnett felt the video confirmed his earlier view that the remix was unnecessary, writing that "we can now move on from all the hype and attention that was this remix," and concluded it was "very much not necessary at all." Jimmy King thought the video compensated for the remix, saying "the video covered up for the song," praised the visuals and direction despite weak concept, and concluded it was "not a bad effort from the Woju crooner," rating it 3.5/5. Al Yhusuff believed the video rescued the remix, stating "the pictorials are captivating," and concluded that it "just salvaged the supposed bad effort in the remix," rating it 4/5.
