= Kizz Daniel =

Nigerian singer-songwriter (born 1994)

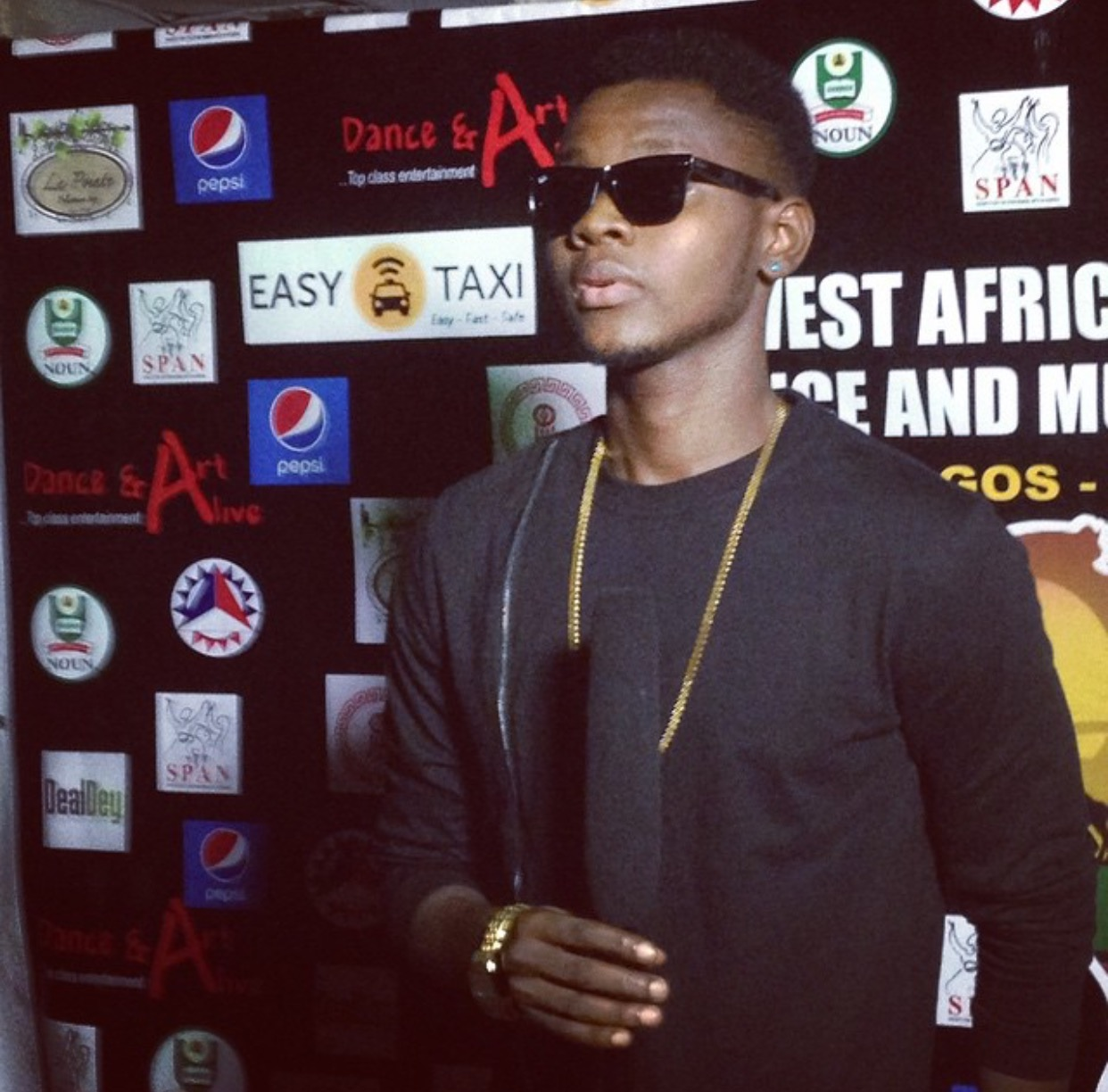
- Kizz Daniel at an event in 2015
- Born: Daniel Oluwatobiloba Anidugbe; 1 May 1994 (age 32); Abeokuta, Ogun State, Nigeria
- Other name: Vado
- Education: Federal University of Agriculture, Abeokuta
- Occupations: Singer; songwriter
- Years active: 2013–present
- Musical career
- Origin: Lagos, Nigeria
- Genres: Afrobeats; pop; R&B
- Instruments: Vocals
- Labels: Flyboy; Empire; G-Worldwide (former)
- Website: kizzdaniel.com

Daniel Oluwatobiloba Anidugbe (born 1 May 1994), professionally known as Kizz Daniel (formerly Kiss Daniel), is a Nigerian singer and songwriter. He rose to fame in 2014 with his breakout single, "Woju". He signed a record deal with G-Worldwide Entertainment in 2013, but left the label following a publicized contract dispute and court case. He founded his own record label, Flyboy I.N.C, in November 2017. On 3 February 2023, he was announced by Audiomack alongside Snazzy the Optimist, Asake and 1ucid as the top trending and most streamed artistes.

== Early life and education ==
Kizz Daniel was born as Daniel Oluwatobiloba Anidugbe in Abeokuta, Ogun State, Nigeria. He hails from Abeokuta north local government area. He attended Abeokuta Grammar School and graduated from Federal University of Agriculture, Abeokuta, in 2013, with a degree in Water Resources Management and Agrometeorology (Water Engineering). While in university, he decided to pursue music as a career alongside his studies.

== Career ==
=== 2013–2014: Early career and breakthrough ===
Kiss Daniel began writing songs at the age of 11. While in secondary school and at FUNAAB, he recorded early material with Jahbless. He graduated in 2013 and began his professional music career after signing with G-Worldwide Entertainment that same year. On 1 May 2014, he released his debut single, "Shoye", which was produced by A1, alongside "Chidioke", produced by Jay Sleek. The music video for "Shoye" was released on 12 July 2014; it was directed by MEX Films. Daniel followed "Shoye" by releasing "Woju" on 1 September 2014. The song was produced by DJ Coublon and features live guitar work from Fiokee. The song had been written around 2012 while he was still in university but recorded shortly before its release. Described as a mid-tempo highlife and Afropop track, "Woju" gained significant radio airplay and television rotation across Nigeria. It was later nominated for Hottest Single of the Year at the 2015 Nigeria Entertainment Awards and won the award for Best Song in Melody at the 2015 COSON Song Awards. The music video peaked at number one on MTV Base's Official Naija Top 10 chart for six weeks. Following its growing popularity, he announced a remix of "Woju" featuring Davido and Tiwa Savage, which was released on 28 February 2015. The remix was met with mixed reviews.

=== 2015–2016: "Laye", "Mama", and New Era ===
On 1 May 2015, Kiss Daniel's birthday, he released a third follow-up single, "Laye", also produced by DJ Coublon. It was followed by a video released two weeks later on 18 May 2015. Shot by AJE Films in East Africa, Daniel's then-labelmate Sugarboy makes a cameo playing the role of his wingman. 360nobs' Henry Igwe said that the visuals were "packed, novel, brilliant stuff" with "an absolute Afro pop material with Makossa undertones", praised the creative use of locations and beats, and concluded, "This. Is. A. Hit!" The video won the award for Best Video by a New Artiste at the 2015 Nigerian Music Video Awards. "Laye" drew criticism from people who thought it sounded too much like "Woju". In response, his manager Louiza Williams acknowledged the criticism and stated that feedback from fans would inform future projects. Arinze Obikili of Jaguda said that Kiss Daniel combined well with DJ Coublon's production, the melody and chorus were catchy, and although it was similar to "Woju", "it's a good showing from Kiss Daniel", giving it a 3.5/5 rating. In October 2015, NotJustOk ranked Kiss Daniel #7 on their annual list of the 10 Hottest Artists In Nigeria.

Kiss Daniel released the Young Jonn-produced single "Mama" on 5 April 2016. In December 2016, Premium Times announced that "Mama" became the most googled song in Nigeria in 2016. It was ranked #2 on 360nobs' list of the Biggest Songs of 2016. The song received positive reception from music critics. Jim Donnett of tooXclusive described "Mama" as a "typical love song", "executed with the styling of a banging turn up jam". The accompanying music video for "Mama" was released on 20 April 2016. Directed by Aje Filmworks, the video shows a car crash caused by the lead character using her phone while driving. It was inspired by Kiss Daniel's own car accident in January of that year, which he survived. The week of 8 May 2016, "Mama" debuted at #4 on the Playdata #RadioTopTen charts, a weekly airplay chart that measured songs being played on the radio and television stations in Nigeria. The following week, it became the most played song on the radio, and managed to climb to the #1 position. It stayed at #1 for four consecutive weeks before being displaced to the #2 position by Phyno's "Fada Fada". At The Headies 2016, the single received a nomination for Best Pop Single while Young Jonn won Producer of the Year for it. The song also won Hottest Single of the Year at the Nigeria Entertainment Awards. Furthermore, the single received nominations for Viewer's Choice at the 2016 Soundcity MVP Awards Festival, Best Artiste/Duo/Group In African RnB & Soul at the 2016 All Africa Music Awards, and Certified Banger of the Year at the 2017 tooXclusive Awards.

On 14 May 2016, Daniel released his debut studio album New Era. The album contained 20 tracks with only label mate Sugarboy making vocal appearances. It was supported by the singles "Woju", "Laye", "Good Time", and "Mama". Upon release, the album debuted at number eight on the Billboard World Albums chart. Critics praised its production, melodies, and songwriting, describing it as a "solid and worthy debut" and "a delightful mix of breezy pop tunes." New Era won Album of the Year and Best R&B/Pop Album at The Headies 2016.

=== 2017–2018: Label exit, single releases and No Bad Songz ===
In October 2017, many of his fans thought he would make a career switch to comedy as he was uploading comedy skits. However, he said he has no intention of switching to comedy as music is his main talent. In November 2017, Kiss Daniel announced his split from his record label, G-Worldwide, and created his own label called Flyboy I.N.C. He was sued to court by the former record label but was not found guilty for any of the crimes he was accused of. In May 2018, Kiss Daniel announced that he had changed his stage name from Kiss Daniel to Kizz Daniel, a name that immediately reflected on his social media accounts. New Spotify and Apple Music accounts were also created immediately with the name Kizz Daniel, with his new songs featured. In June 2018, Kizz Daniel's former record label, G-Worldwide, made a move to own the rights to the name "Kizz Daniel" and further advised the singer to desist from using the name or face legal consequences in a press release sent out to media houses. In October 2018, Daniel responded to the suit and statement made by his former record label, G-Worldwide, through his own lawyer. After his exit from G-Worldwide, he went to float his own personal imprint Flyboy I.N.C. where he signed two acts, Demmie Vee and Philkeyz. Kizz Daniel was featured on Demmie Vee's debut single entitled "You Go Wait?" in 2018. He featured Wizkid on the song "For You" and Davido on "One Ticket" in May and November 2018 respectively. On 30 November 2018, Kizz Daniel released his second studio album (his first under Flyboy I.N.C), titled No Bad Songz. The album housed 20 tracks and features guest appearances from Davido, Nasty C, Diamond Platnumz, Philkeyz, Demmie Vee, DJ Xclusive, Wretch 32, Diplo and Sarkodie. The album received positive reviews from fans and critics, it debuted at No. 55 on the US iTunes Chart and rose to number 1 on the iTunes World Albums chart within 24 hours of its release.

=== 2019–2020: "Fvck You" and King of Love ===
On 15 March 2019, Kizz Daniel released "Fvck You", which was produced and co-written by Young Jonn. Released to promote his upcoming performance at the O2 Arena in London, it gained widespread attention through a viral open-verse challenge, with participation from artists including Tiwa Savage, Simi, Falz, Sarkodie, and Wyclef Jean, which helped drive its popularity online. Some covers generated controversy, as Tiwa Savage denied speculation that her version targeted her ex-husband Tunji Balogun or Wizkid, while Simi later apologized over criticism of a lyric in her rendition. The song centers on themes of infidelity and relationship conflict, with Kizz Daniel naming numerous celebrities on the track. On 25 June 2020, Kizz Daniel released his third studio album King of Love. The album focused on themes of romantic and emotional connections and featured production from multiple Nigerian producers. Critics praised its songwriting and cohesive sound.

=== 2021–2022: Barnabas, "Buga" and "Cough (Odo)" ===
Kizz Daniel released his debut extended play, Barnabas on 19 November 2021, through Flyboy I.N.C and Empire Distribution. The project was released without prior announcement, with Kizz Daniel stating that he selected seven songs from his laptop and compiled them into the EP. All seven tracks debuted on the TurnTable Top 50, with "Lie" spending seven consecutive weeks at number one, while "Pour Me Water" also reached the top spot after going viral. Barnabas features guest appearances from The Cavemen and Kelvyn Colt, with production handled by Philkeyz, Reward Beatz, Roc Legion, DJ Coublon, and Blaisebeatz. It was described as cohesive and reflective by music critics, with some acknowledging its experimental style.

In April 2022, Kizz Daniel and Emperor Geezy, the head of his former record label G-Worldwide, settled their disputes, outside the court in a viral video tagged #Peace&Love. On 4 May 2022, Kizz Daniel released the single "Buga", featuring Tekno, as his first single of the year and the second single off his fourth album Maverick (2023). The Afropop and Afrobeats track topped the TurnTable Top 100 for seven weeks and was named the publication's leading song of 2022. It recorded 57.9 million streams in Nigeria that year and at one point became the most Shazamed song in the world. The song won Song of the Year at the 2023 Soundcity MVP Awards Festival and received several nominations at The Headies 2023. For the 2022 FIFA World Cup, Kizz Daniel performed "Buga" in Qatar on 26 November 2022; he confirmed that he would perform at the event in October 2022. On 8 August 2022, Kizz Daniel was arrested in Dar es Salaam by the Tanzania Police Force after he failed to perform at a scheduled show during his Afroclassic Tour. He later said the issue came from travel delays, misplaced luggage, and problems with the event's arrangements, which led to a dispute with the promoter over the concert.

On 14 October 2022, he released his second single of the year, "Cough (Odo)", produced by Blaisebeatz and Philkeyz, as the third single from Maverick and the compilation album Where We Come From, Vol. 01. The Afropop song draws its subtitle from the Twi word "odo", meaning love, which Daniel said was a tribute to his Ghanaian fans after the success of "Buga" in the country. Lyrically, the track focuses on romance and the excitement of impressing a new partner. It debuted at No. 1 on the TurnTable Top 100, becoming his fourth chart-topping single and recording 10.5 million streams and more than 70 million radio impressions in its first week. At the end of 2022, Kizz Daniel was named Artiste of the Year by Leadership newspaper.

=== 2023–2024: Maverick, "Too Busy to Be Bae", "Twe Twe" and TZA ===
On 6 January 2023, Kizz Daniel released "RTID (Rich Till I Die)" as the fourth single from Maverick. The song was produced by Reward Beatz and Blaisebeatz, and centers on themes of gratitude, resilience, and success. It debuted at number two on the TurnTable Top 100 and was later certified platinum in Nigeria. The music video, directed by TG Omori, gained over 1.7 million views within three days. The song received mixed reviews, with some praising its motivational message and others criticizing its impact within the album. Kizz Daniel released "Shu-Peru" on 12 May 2023 as the fifth single from Maverick. The song received mixed reviews from fans; some criticized it for its simple lyrics and others defended it, saying that it's supposed to be light-hearted. Kizz Daniel released the remix to "Cough (Odo)", featuring American singer Becky G, on 21 July 2023, as Maverick's sixth single. Kizz Daniel released his fourth studio album, Maverick, on 28 July through Flyboy I.N.C and Empire Distribution. It marked his first full-length project in three years and was created within a short period at his residence in Lagos. The album, which covers themes of family, personal growth, and loss, featured guest appearances from Becky G, Not3s, Jahmiel, Yemi Alade, and Nomcebo Zikode, among others. On 9 October 2023, Kizz Daniel released "My G" as the seventh and final single from Maverick, alongside its music video, which was directed by TG Omori and features a cameo from Enioluwa Adeoluwa. "My G" was produced by DJ Coublon, Roc Legion, M.O.G Beatz, Killertunes, and Fiokee. The song focuses on self-confidence and responding to critics. It gained traction through a viral TikTok challenge that drew thousands of entries and celebrity participation.

On 11 December 2023, Kizz Daniel released the singles "Too Busy to Be Bae" and "Twe Twe". "Too Busy to Be Bae", produced by P.Priime, uses a mid-tempo Afropop beat and addresses people who focus on work and daily hustle instead of romantic relationships. "Twe Twe" blends Afropop with Nupe traditional sounds and percussion, while its lyrics celebrate dance and cultural pride. Afrocritik's Abioye Damilare Samson called the song "a controlled experiment" that sees Kizz Daniel blend traditional Nupe influences to create "a sonic experience that is both authentic and exhilarating." Afrocritik's Abioye Damilare Samson called "Twe Twe" "a controlled experiment" that sees Kizz Daniel blend traditional Nupe influences to create "a sonic experience that is both authentic and exhilarating." Daniel released a remix to "Twe Twe" featuring Davido on 26 January 2024. Gabriel Myers Hansen, reviewing the remix for Music in Africa, wrote that was "light in lyrical value" but effective because "the lyrics take a back seat and the beats take the wheel." He acknowledged its "hedonistic fetishes and danceability," calling it "one of this year's first big hits," and concluding that Kizz Daniel remained "a proven hitmaker." "Twe Twe"'s remix won No. 1 Song at the TurnTable Music Awards, and received multiple nominations at The Headies 2024, such as Afrobeats Single of the Year, Best Collaboration, Music Video of the Year.

On 11 March 2024, Kizz Daniel released his second extended play, TZA, as a follow-up to Maverick. Supported by the singles "Too Busy to Be Bae" and "Twe Twe", the EP was released through Flyboy I.N.C and Empire Distribution and was created to mark his 10th anniversary in the Nigerian music industry. Its title, meaning "thanks a lot", expresses appreciation to his fans. TZA includes four tracks and blends Afrobeats, pop, jùjú, and Nupe influences. To promote the project, Kizz Daniel embarked on a European tour. The EP received mixed reception from critics, who noted its familiar sound but questioning its depth and cohesion.

== Personal life ==
On 1 May 2021, he welcomed a set of triplets with his girlfriend, whose identity he keeps private. Kizz later revealed how he lost one of his triplets, just four days after birth as he acquired a two-bedroom penthouse each for his other children.

He acquired a new house and announced it in September 2022. According to his own statements, he always wanted a house on the water for his wife and children which he claims will soon be possible.

In June 2025, Kizz Daniel announced that he was taking a break from recording new music to focus more on his family.

== Discography ==
=== Studio albums ===
- New Era (2016)
- No Bad Songz (2018)
- King of Love (2020)
- Maverick (2023)

== Tours ==
=== Headlining ===
- Kiss Daniel UK Tour (2015)
- Kiss Daniel USA Tour (2016)
- New Era: Europe Summer Tour (2017)
- NBS Concert Tour (2019)

== Awards and nominations ==
Year	Event	Prize	Recipient	Result	Ref
2014	Extreme Awards	Next Rated	Himself	Won	
2014	Maya Awards	Newcomer/Revelation of the Year	Himself	Won	
2014	tooXclusive Awards	Best New Artiste	Himself	Nominated	
2015	The Headies	Next Rated	Himself	Nominated	
2015	African Muzik Magazine Awards	Best Newcomer	Himself	Nominated	
2015	Nigeria Entertainment Awards	Best New Act to Watch	Himself	Won	
2015	COSON Song Awards	Best Song in Melody	"Woju"	Won	
2015	COSON Song Awards	Hottest Song on the Street	"Woju"	Nominated	
2015	All Africa Music Awards	Revelation of the Year in Africa	Kiss Daniel for "Woju"	Nominated	
2015	All Africa Music Awards	Most Promising Artist in Africa	Kiss Daniel for "Woju"	Won	
2015	City People Entertainment Awards	Most Promising Act of the Year (Male)	Himself	Nominated	
2015	City People Entertainment Awards	Popular Song of the Year	"Woju"	Nominated	
2015	4Syte TV Music Video Awards	Best African Act Video	"Woju" (Remix)	Won	
2015	tooXclusive Awards	Best Street-Hop Track	"Laye"	Nominated	
2015	Nigerian Music Video Awards	Best Video by a New Artiste	"Laye"	Won	
2015	Nigerian Music Video Awards	Best Highlife Video	"Laye"	Nominated	
2015	Nigerian Music Video Awards	Best Cinematography	Aje Filmworks for "Laye"	Nominated	
2015	Africa Youth Choice Awards	Next Rated	Himself	Won	
2015	Peace Achievers Awards	Best New Act	Himself	Won	
2016	MTV Africa Music Awards	Listener's Choice	Himself	Nominated	
2016	Nigeria Entertainment Awards	Afropop Artist of the Year	Himself	Won	
2016	Nigeria Entertainment Awards	Hottest Single of the Year	"Mama"	Won	
2016	City People Music Awards	Music Artist of the Year (Male)	Himself	Won	
2016	City People Music Awards	Popular Song of the Year	"Laye"	Nominated	
2016	The Headies	Best R&B/Pop Album	New Era	Won	
2016	The Headies	Hip Hop World Revelation of the Year	Kiss Daniel for New Era	Won	
2016	The Headies	Best Pop Single	"Mama"	Nominated	
2016	The Headies	Album of the Year	New Era	Won	
2017	The Future Awards Africa	Nigeria Prize for Music	Himself	Nominated	
2017	Nigeria Entertainment Awards	Best Album of the Year	New Era	Nominated	
2017	Nigeria Entertainment Awards	Best Afropop Male Artist	Himself	Nominated	
2018	The Headies	Song of the Year	"Yeba"	Nominated	
2018	The Headies	Best Pop Single	"Yeba"	Nominated	
2018	The Headies	Best Reggae/Dancehall Single	"Sofa"	Nominated	
2018	The Headies	Viewer's Choice	"Yeba"	Nominated	
2023	Soundcity MVP Awards Festival	Song of the Year	"Buga" (featuring Tekno)	Won	
2024	TurnTable Music Awards	No. 1 Song	"Twe Twe" (featuring Davido)	Won	

== See also ==
- List of artists who reached number one in Nigeria
