= Killertunes =

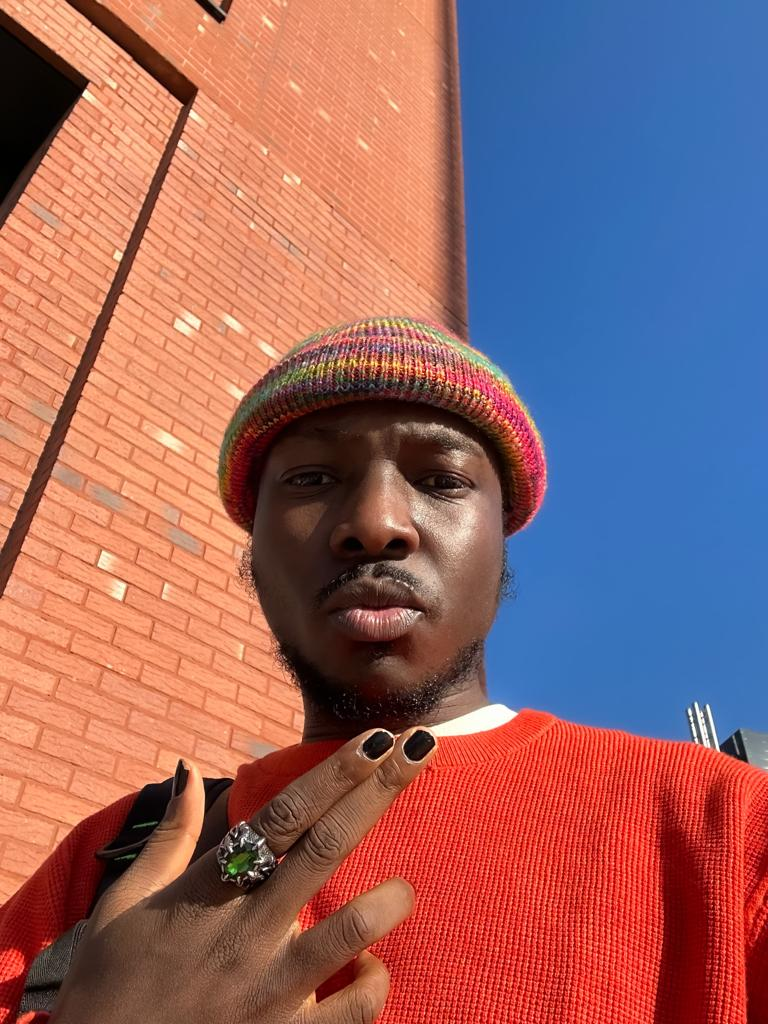
- Killertunes in 2023

Background information
- Also known as: Shabalistica
- Born: Otaniyen-Uwa Daniel; 22 June 1994 (age 31); Benin City
- Genres: Afropop; Afrobeats; African hip hop; jazz; hip hop; R&B
- Occupations: Record producer, songwriter, singer
- Years active: 2013–present
- Labels: Tribeii Entertainment; emPawa Africa

Otaniyen-Uwa Daniel professionally known as Killertunes is a Nigerian record producer and songwriter who has produced "Manya" by Wizkid, "Motigbana" by Olamide, "Baba" by DJ Spinall featuring Kizz daniel and "Bobo" by Mayorkun featuring Davido.

Killertunes won the Headies award producer of the year in 2019 for the song "Fake Love" by Duncan Mighty and Wizkid and he was nominated for Afro hip-hop producer of the year at the Beatz awards 2022 for the song "big energy" by Ladipoe. He also has nominations for producer of the year at the Nigeria Entertainment award and City people music awards and a nomination for best music at the Top Naija Music Award.

== Background and career ==
In 2020, Killertunes was listed among the Top beat makers in Nigeria.

In 2019 Killertunes released his debut Extended play titled "Gbedu & things" he featured Dj tunez in the five-song EP.

== Discography ==
List of Singles Produced
Title	Year released	Artist(s)	Album
Manya	2017	Wizkid, Mut4Y	EU4RIA
Motigbana	2018	Olamide	non-album single
Baba	2018	Dj Spinall, Kizz Daniel	Iyanu
Bobo	2018	Mayorkun, Davido	The Mayor of Lagos
Fake love	2018	Duncan Mighty, Wizkid	non- album single
Doyin	2019	Mr. Eazi, Simi	non- album single
Big Energy	2022	Ladipoe	non- album single

== Awards and nominations ==
Award	Year	Recipient(s) and nominees(s)	Category	Result	Ref.
The Beatz Awards	2022	Killertunes	Afro hip-hop producer of the year	Nominated	
Nigerian Entertainment Awards	2021	Killertunes	Music Producer of the year	Nominated	
City People music Awards	2022	Killertunes	Music Producer of the Year	Nominated	
Top Naija Music Award	2022	Killertunes	Best Music	Nominated	
The Headies Awards	2019	Killertunes	Producer of the year	Won	
The Beatz Awards 2018	2018	Killertunes	Afro beats producer of the year	Won	
The Beatz Awards 2018	2018	Killertunes	Afro highlife producer of the year	Won	
The Beatz Awards 2018	2018	Killertunes	Producer of the year	Won	
