= Fiokee =

- Born: Ifiok Effanga; January 10, 1982 (age 44); Akwa Ibom State, Nigeria
- Genres: Afrobeats, highlife
- Occupation: Guitarist
- Instrument: Guitar
- Years active: 2009–present
- Label: Fiokee Records
- Website: fiokeerecords.com

Ifiok Effanga, professionally known as Fiokee, is a Nigerian guitarist. He is known for his trebly guitar solos infused with highlife steeped guitar lines. He was born on 10 January 1982. Fiokee is associated with acts such as Tiwa Savage, Yemi Alade, Patoranking, Reekado Banks, Adekunle Gold, Flavour, Simi, and Kiss Daniel, among others. He studied at the Petroleum Training Institute in Effurun, Delta State.

== Playing style ==
He is known for his distinct blend of contemporary highlife and Afrobeats, with occasional forays into blues. His solos (sessions work) often a serve as outros and feature his signature trebley S-type Guitar. His solos often closely toe the line of the main melodic theme, with his outro in 'nobody wey no fit make am' a case in point.

He has expressed his interest in inculcating Afro-jazz into his playing. His playing style include: rapid thrills, legato and frequent octave move.

== Background ==
Fiokee was born in Akwa ibom state in Nigeria, the fourth child of six. Fiokee began his interest in music at a very young age in a church choir, where he learned to sing the solfa notation. He later received guitar lessons from a taxicab driver, but quit due to financial limitations.

In 2003, Fiokee began studying mechanical engineering at Delta State and began playing at churches.

== Career ==
In 2008, Fiokee went to Lagos State to participate in a reality television music competition show called Star Quest and won as part of a group called Diamonds. He soon gained popularity for such collaborations as Simisola by Simi, Thankful by Flavour, God Over Everything by Patoranking, "Woju" by Kiss Daniel, and "Ferrari" by Yemi Alade.

In 2016, Fiokee started a record label called Fiokee Records.

On 14 January 2022, Fiokee dropped his first album, MAN with fourteen tracks and each track featuring renowned Nigerian artistes.

== Discography ==
=== Singles ===
- "Like" by Reekado Banks (featuring Tiwa Savage and Fiokee)
- "Duro" (Cover)
- "Independent Woman" (featuring Jumabi)
- "Sweetest Thing" (featuring Ric Hassani)
- "Juju" by Gabiro Guitar (featuring Fiokee)
- "Very Connected" (featuring Flavour)
- "Dumebi" (featuring Davido and Peruzzi)
- ''Follow You'' (Chike and Gyakie)
