= M.O.G Beatz =

Ghanaian music producer

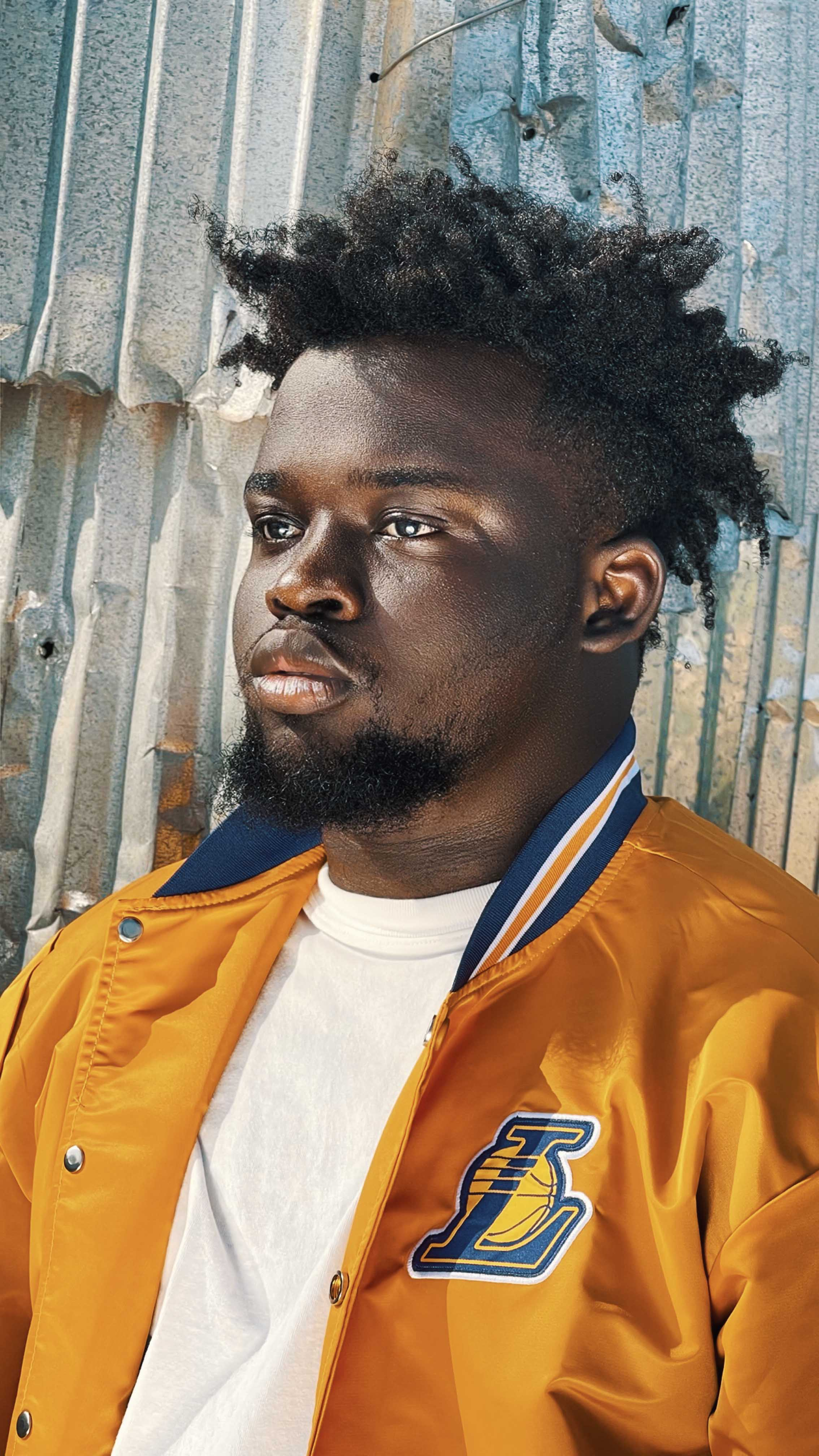

Background information
- Born: John Dosunmu-Mensah; Accra, Ghana
- Genres: Afro-pop, R&B, Hip hop, Afrobeats, Highlife, Hiplife, Fuji
- Occupation: Record producer singer
- Instruments: Keyboard; music sequencer; drum machine; synthesizer; sampler; beatboxing; vocals
- Years active: 2009–present
- Website: https://www.mogbeatz.com/

John Kwesi Dosunmu-Mensah, professionally known as M.O.G Beatz or simply MOG or M.O.G, is a Ghanaian record producer, composer, singer and songwriter record producer who specializes in Afro-pop, Hip hop, Afrobeats, R&B, Hiplife, Fuji and Highlife.

== Early life and Music career ==
In 2016 M.O.G produced the hit single "RNS" by Sarkodie, The song won "HipLife Song Of The Year" award at the Ghana Music Awards UK and was nominated for "HipLife Song of the Year" at the 2017 edition of Vodafone Ghana Music Awards. He won "Producer of the year" awards for Four consecutive times at 3Music Awards making him the first and only producer Ghanaian music producer to achieve this. In 2023, M.O.G produced the new version of Bob Marley And The Wailers’ song ‘Stir It Up featuring Sarkodie.

== Production credits ==
- Sarkodie – RNS (2016)
- Shatta Wale – Amount
- Wendy Shay – Uber Driver (2018)
- Wendy Shay – Astalavista (2018)
- Dope Nation ft Olamide- Naami
- Kizz Daniel – Poko
- Shatta Wale – Only One Man
- Sarkodie ft Efya – Saara
- Sarkodie ft Rudeboy – Lucky
- Sarkodie ft Prince Bright- Ofeets)
- Sarkodie ft Coded – Year of return
- Kwesi Arthur ft Mr Eazi – Nobody
- Wendy Shay – All For You
- Wendy Shay ft Shatta Wale – Stevie Wonder
- Kuami Eugene ft Sarkodie – No More
- Kuami Eugene ft Kidi – Ohemaa
- KiDi ft Kwesi Arthur – Mr Badmind
- Adina – Sika
- KiDi – Enjoyment
- Stonebwoy – Everlasting
- Mr Drew – Let me Know
- Sarkodie – Happy Day ft Kuami Eugene
- Joeboy – Focus (2021)
- Ebony Reigns X Wendy Shay – John 8:7
- Kidi – So Fine (2021)
- Kidi – Mon Bébé (2021)
- Sarkodie ft. Kwesi Arthur- Coachella (2021)
- King Promise ft. Headie One – Ring My Line (2021)
- Darkovibes ft. Davido – Je M’apelle (2021)
- Kwesi Arthur x Teni – Celebrate (2021)
- Kevin Gates – Move (2021)
- Wendy Shay – Survivor (2022)
- Kidi ft Mavado – BLESSED (2022)
- Adina – Adidede (2022)
- Sarkodie ft Black Sherif – Country Side (2022)
- Bob Marley And The Wailers’ ‘Stir it Up featuring Sarkodie
- Kuami Eugene – I Feel Nice (2022)
- Sarkodie – Try Me (2023)
- Lil Kesh ft Young Jonn – Feeling Funny (2023)
- Lasmid – Bad Boy (2023) Lasmid
- Mr. Drew ft Mophy – Case (2023)
- Kizz Daniel – My G (2023)
- Mr. Eazi – Advice (2023)
- Sarkodie ft Ruger – Till We Die (2023)
- Kwesi Arthur – 4LYFE (2023)
- Sarkodie – Otan (2023)
- Sarkodie ft Beeztrap – Amen (2024)
- Beeztrap – Yesu (2024)
- Amerado – I Am Aware (2024)
- Sarkodie – Everlasting ft Shatta Wale (2026)

== Awards and nominations ==
Year	Prize	Award	Result	Ref
2018	Producer of the Year	Ashiaman Music Awards	Won	
2019	Producer of the Year	Vodafone Ghana Music Awards	Nominated	
2019	Producer of the Year	3Music Awards	Won	
2019	Producer of the Year	3rd TV Awards	Won	
2019	Producer of the Year	Muse Africa	Won	
2020	Producer of the Year	3Music Awards	Won	
2020	Producer of the Year	Muse Africa	Won	
2020	Producer of the Year	Vodafone Ghana Music Awards	Won	
2020	Producer of the Year	SoundCity MVP Awards	Nominated	
2020	Producer of the Year	Ghana Music Awards USA	Nominated	
2021	Producer of the Year	3Music Awards	Won	
2022	Producer of the Year	3Music Awards	Won	
2022	Producer of the Year	Vodafone Ghana Music Awards	Won	
2022	Producer of the Year	Ghana Music Awards UK	Nominated	
2022	Producer of the Year	Ghana Music Awards US	Nominated	
2022	Producer of the Year	SoundCity MVP Awards	Nominated	
2022	Producer of the Year	3Music Awards	Won	
2023	Producer of the Year	Vodafone Ghana Music Awards	Won	
2023	Producer of the Year	GEA USA	Won	
2023	Producer of the Year	Afrimma	Nominated	
2024	Producer of the Year	Telecel Ghana Music Awards	Won	
2024	Producer of the Year	3Music Awards	Won	
