= Blaisebeatz =

Nigerian record producer

- Born: Marcel Larry Akunwata; June 16; Anambra State, Nigeria
- Citizenship: Nigeria
- Education: Federal University of Technology, Minna
- Occupations: Record producer, songwriter
- Years active: 2016–present
- Musical career
- Genres: Afro pop, Dancehall, Amapiano
- Website: www.blaisebeatz.com

Marcel Larry Akunwata (born June 16), popularly known as Blaisebeatz or Blaise Beats, is a Nigerian record producer, and songwriter. He rose to stardom in 2020 with the production hit "Pami" by DJ Tunez. His other production hits includes "Enjoy" by Tekno, "Sinner", "It Is What It Is", and "Mercy" by Adekunle Gold, "Call Me Every Day" by Chris Brown, "Buga" by Kizz Daniel, and "No Wahala" by 1da Banton. In 2022, he won the Afro Highlife Producer Of The Year and Afro Dancehall Producer Of The Year at The Beatz Awards.

== Early life, and career ==
Marcel Larry Akunwata hails from Anambra state. He grew up in Niger state, where he had his primary and secondary education before proceeding to the university to study statistics at the Federal University of Technology, Minna, where he graduated with a BSc.

Larry's musical journey started in 2004 when he began playing instruments in church and later joined a live band. In 2006, he ventured into music production and began using the stage name Larryblaise, and later changed his brand name to Blaisebeatz. In 2016, he gained recognition for his minor production hit "I Miss Good Music" by Jumabee, with features guest vocals from Banky W., Sound Sultan, Niyola, and Chigul, and "Nkechi" by Attitude.

In 2020, he rose to stardom with the release of "PAMI" by DJ Tunez, which features guest vocals from Wizkid, Omah Lay, and Adekunle Gold. Since he came into the limelight, he has been credited for multiple production hits, including "Suru" by Tekno, "Omaema" by Skiibi, "Nyamba" by Irene Ntale, "My Darlina" by King Perryy, "Fa'ya" by Ceeza Milli, "Kill Man" by Terri, "Okay" by Adekunle Gold, "Need More" by Reekado Banks, "Quarantine" by Alpha P, "In My Mind" by BNXN, "So Bad" by Simi, and "Cough (Odo)" by Kizz Daniel.

== Artistry ==
He cited Timberland, Ryan Leslie, Don Jazzy, Masterkraft, and Sarz, as his influence.

== Production discography ==
Albums/EPs produced

Artist	Album/EP	Release date	Certifications	Label	Note
1da Banton	Original Vibes Machine	22 July 2021			
Blaqbonez	Sex Over Love	30 April 2021		Chocolate City	Co-Producer
BNXN	Bad Since '97	26 August 2022		TYE; Empire Distribution	Co-Producer
Chris Brown	Breezy	24 June 2022		RCA; CBE	Co-Producer
CKay	Sad Romance	23 September 2022		Warner Music Africa	Co-Producer
Davido	A Better Time	13 November 2020		DMW; RCA; Sony	Co-Producer
Davido	Timeless	31 March 2023		DMW • Columbia • Sony	Co-Producer
Fireboy DML	Playboy	4 August 2022		YBNL Nation; EMPIRE	Co-Producer
L.A.X	Rasaking	26 September 2018		Rasaki Music	Co-Producer
Majeeed	Bitter Sweet	25 March 2022		Dream Empire Music	Co-Producer
Reekado Banks	Off The Record	27 November 2020		Banks Music	Co-Producer
Simi	TBH (To Be Honest)	3 June 2022		Studio Brat	Co-Producer
Tekno	Old Romance	10 December 2020		Island; The Cartel Entertainment	Co-Producer
Terri	Afro Series	30 April 2020		Starboy Entertainment	Co-Producer
Victony	Outlaw	6 May 2022		PLUG Entertainment	Co-Producer

== Awards and nominations ==
Year	Award	Category	Recipient	Result
2019	City People Music Awards	Music Producer of the Year	Himself	Nominated
2020	City People Music Awards	Music Producer of the Year	Himself	Nominated
2021	The Beatz Awards	Producer of the Year	Himself for (Adekunle Gold - "Sinner")	Nominated
2021	The Beatz Awards	Afro Highlife Producer of the Year	Himself for (Tekno - "Enjoy")	Nominated
2022	The Beatz Awards	Afro-Pop Producer Of The Year	Himself for (1da Banton - "No Wahala")	Nominated
2022	The Beatz Awards	Afro Highlife Producer Of The Year	Himself for (Simi - "Logba Logba")	Won
2022	The Beatz Awards	Afro Dancehall Producer Of The Year	Himself for (Adekunle Gold - "Mercy")	Won
2022	The Beatz Awards	Producer Of The Year	Himself for (1da Banton - "No Wahala")	Nominated
2022	The Headies	Producer of the Year	Himself for (Adekunle Gold - "Sinner")	Nominated
2023	The Headies	Songwriter of the Year	Himself for (Simi - "Loyal" feat. Fave)	Won
2024	TurnTable Music Awards	No. 1 Producer	Himself	Won
