= Afrocritik =

Online website in Nigeria

- Managing editor: Emmanuel "Waziri" Okoro
- Founder: Samson Jikeme; Owanate Max-Harry
- Founded: June 2021
- Country: Nigeria; US
- Based in: Lagos; Los Angeles
- Language: English
- Website: Official website

Afrocritik is a digital media platform that focuses on African art, entertainment, fashion, music, movies, and culture. It was established in 2021 by Samson Jikeme and Owanate Max-Harry.

== History ==
Afrocritik was established by Nigerian lawyers Samson Jikeme and Owanate Max-Harry in June 2021 with headquarters in Lagos and Los Angeles. The website started as a blog where the founders shared their own critiques and analysis of African literature, music, film, and other art forms.

As of 2025, Emmanuel "Waziri" Okoro is the current managing editor replacing Sybil Fekurumoh.

== Content ==
Afrocritik focuses on music, fashion, film, art, events and politics with its audience being mainly young people of Africa and the African diaspora. It publishes end of the year listicles on music and literature such as "Top 25 Albums", "33 Remarkable African Short Stories", "15 Notable Essays in Nigeria". In 2025, The Top African Albums was extended from 25 to 50 entries, while the Top African Songs extended from 50 to 100.

In August 2024, Evidence Egwuono Adjarho won the Afrocritik Prize for Criticism with Olúwatúnmiṣe Ọ̀tọ̀lórìn Akìgbógun and Daniella Oluwatomisin Kolade coming up as first and second runner up.

In March 2026, Afrocritik released it Inaugural Annual report with articles from the finest writers around.
