= TurnTable End of the Year Top 100 of 2022 =

Record chart

The TurnTable End of the Year Top 100 of 2022 is a chart that ranks the best-performing singles in Nigeria. Its data, published by TurnTable magazine, is based collectively on each single's weekly physical and digital sales, as well as airplay and streaming. At the end of a year, TurnTable publishes an annual list of the 100 most successful songs throughout that year on its top 100 charts based on the information published on 22 December 2022 in TurnTable, and calculated with data from January 3, 2022, to December 12, 2022.

TurnTable named Asake the top Artist of 2022, making him the first artist to achieve this honor, following the expansion of the Top 50 into 100. Asake placed twelve songs on the list, with the highest ranked of them "Sungba (Remix)" at number four. Asake debut studio album Mr. Money with the Vibe, became the first album to debut at number one on the newly launched album chart, and Asake "Peace Be Unto You (PBUY)" became the first song to debut at number one, following the expansion of the single chart from 50 to 100.

== Year-end list ==
List of songs on TurnTable's 2022 Year-End Top 100 chart
No.	Title	Artist(s)
1	"Buga (Lo Lo Lo)"	Kizz Daniel and Tekno
2	"Bandana"	Fireboy DML and Asake
3	"Overloading (OVERDOSE)"	Mavins, Ayra Starr and Crayon featuring Magixx, Boy Spyce, Ladipoe
4	"Sungba (Remix)"	Asake featuring Burna Boy
5	"Calm Down"	Rema and Selena Gomez
6	"Peace Be Unto You (PBUY)"	Asake
7	"Last Last"	Burna Boy
8	"Baddest Boy (Remix)"	Skiibii featuring Davido
9	"Peru"	Fireboy DML and Ed Sheeran
10	"Omo Ope"	Asake featuring Olamide
11	"Terminator"	Asake
12	"PALAZZO"	SPINALL and Asake
13	"Don't Call Me"	Lil Kesh featuring Zinoleesky
14	"For My Hand"	Burna Boy featuring Ed Sheeran
15	"Finesse"	Pheelz and BNXN
16	"Sometimes (Remix)"	T.I BLAZE featuring Olamide
17	"Playboy"	Fireboy DML
18	"Electricity"	Pheelz and Davido
19	"It's Plenty"	Burna Boy
20	"Sugarcane (Remix)"	Camidoh featuring Mayorkun, Darkoo and King Promise
21	"Pour Me Water"	Kizz Daniel
22	"Kwaku the Traveller"	Black Sherif
23	"Girlfriend"	Ruger
24	"Cough (Odo)"	EMPIRE and Kizz Daniel
25	"Rush"	Ayra Starr
26	"Holy Father"	Mayorkun featuring Vict0ny
27	"KU LO SA - A COLORS SHOW"	Oxlade
28	"Dada (Remix)"	Young Jonn featuring Davido
29	"Joha"	Asake
30	"Cold Outside"	Timaya featuring BNXN
31	"Loving You"	Zinoleesky
32	"Ozumba Mbadiwe"	Reekado Banks
33	"Common Person"	Burna Boy
34	"Eh God (Barnabas)"	Kizz Daniel
35	"Ijo (Laba Laba)"	Crayon
36	"Organise"	Asake
37	"Dior"	Ruger
38	"Xtra Cool"	Young Jonn
39	"High"	Adekunle Gold featuring Davido
40	"Emiliana"	CKay
41	"Monalisa"	Lojay, Sarz, and Chris Brown
42	"Stand Strong"	Davido featuring Sunday Service Choir
43	"B. D'OR"	Burna Boy featuring Wizkid
44	"Woman"	Omah Lay
45	"Baby Riddim"	Fave
46	"No Wahala (Remix)"	1Da Banton featuring Kizz Daniel and Tiwa Savage
47	"Italy"	BNXN featuring Blaq Diamond
48	"Certified Loner (No Competition)"	Mayorkun
49	"Champion Sound"	Davido and Focalistic
50	"Kolomental"	Vict0ny
51	"Sip (Alcohol)"	Joeboy
52	"Kilometer (Remix)"	BNXN featuring Zinoleesky
53	"Philo"	Bella Shmurda and Omah Lay
54	"Love Don't Cost a Dime (Re-Up)"	Magixx and Ayra Starr
55	"Oshe"	Kizz Daniel featuring The Cavemen.
56	"Attention"	Omah Lay and Justin Bieber
57	"Soweto"	Vict0ny and Tempoe
58	"Second Sermon (Remix)"	Black Sherif featuring Burna Boy
59	"Bad To Me"	Wizkid
60	"Wait for U"	Future featuring Drake and Tems
61	"Come My Way"	Wande Coal
62	"i'm a mess"	Omah Lay
63	"Machala"	Carter Efe and Berri-Tiga
64	"Kenkele"	BNXN and Wande Coal
65	"Rocking"	Zinoleesky
66	"understand"	Omah Lay
67	"Call Me Every Day"	Chris Brown featuring Wizkid
68	"Dull"	Asake
69	"Lie"	Kizz Daniel
70	"Blessings"	Niphkeys and Zinoleesky
71	"Try"	T.I BLAZE
72	"Come & Go (Black Sherif Remix)"	Arrdee featuring Black Sherif
73	"Loyalty"	Ajebo Hustlers
74	"Bloody Samaritan (Remix)"	Ayra Starr and Kelly Rowland
75	"Nzaza"	Asake
76	"Call of Duty"	Zinoleesky
77	"Ameno Amapiano (Remix)"	Goya Menor and Nektunez
78	"My Friend"	Bella Shmurda
79	"5 Star"	Adekunle Gold
80	"soso"	Omah Lay
81	"WATAWI"	CKay featuring Davido, Focalistic, and Abidoza
82	"With You"	Khaid
83	"Mood"	Wizkid featuring Buju
84	"Back In Uni"	Blaqbonez and Jae5
85	"Jaiye Foreign"	Tiwa Savage and Zinoleesky
86	"Essence"	Wizkid featuring Tems
87	"Loaded"	Tiwa Savage and Asake
88	"Like"	Iyanya, Davido and Kizz Daniel
89	"Trabaye"	Asake
90	"Feel Good"	MohBad
91	"Kilo"	T.I BLAZE and Skiibii
92	"Move"	Bad Boy Timz
93	"Always"	Darkoo featuring Black Sherif
94	"Mercy"	Adekunle Gold
95	"Snapchat"	Ruger
96	"New Born Fela"	Bella Shmurda
97	"Love Nwantiti (Ah Ah Ah) - [Remix]"	CKay featuring Joeboy and Kuami Eugene
98	"As It Was"	Harry Styles
99	"IDG"	Aṣa featuring Wizkid
100	"Apollo"	Vict0ny
