= Billboard Year-End U.S. Afrobeats Songs of 2022 =

American music chart

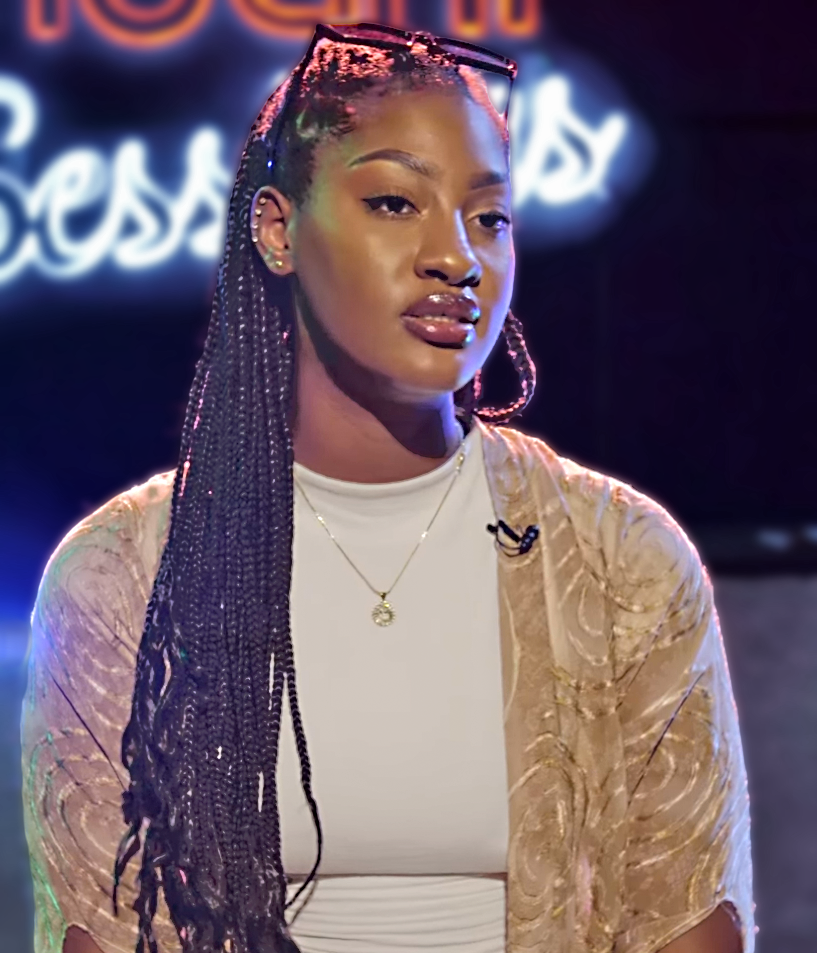
Tems top charted artist of 2022

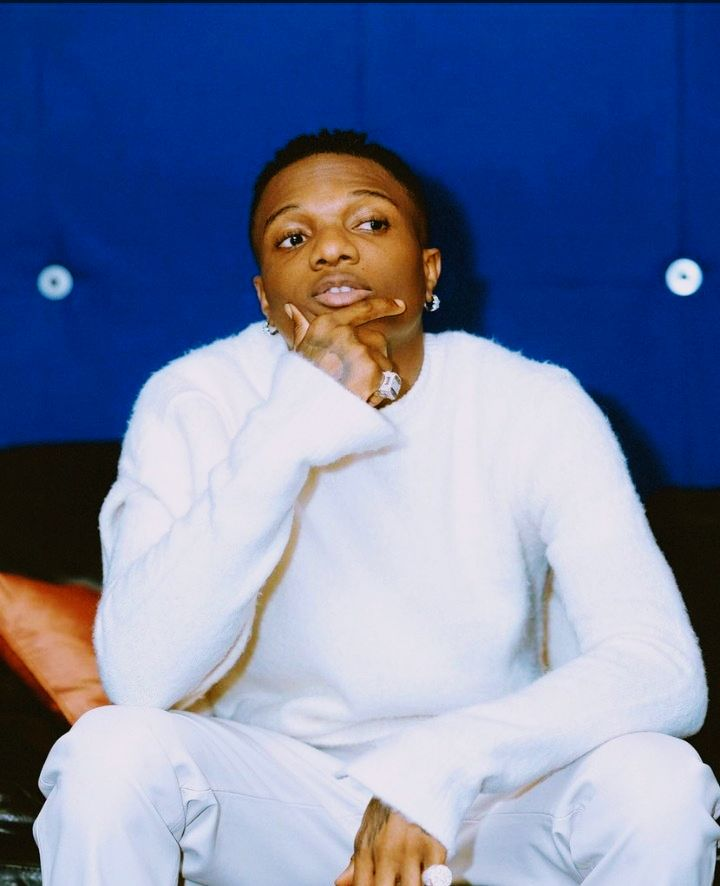
Wizkid "Essence" with Justin Bieber and Tems became song of the year.

The Billboard U.S. Afrobeats Songs chart ranks the best-performing Afrobeats singles in the United States. Its data is assembled by the charts production manager Michael Cusson, and published on Billboard magazine. At the end of the year, Billboard will publish an annual list of the 100 most successful songs throughout that year on the Afrobeats chart based on the information. For 2022, the list was published on December 1, and calculated with data from April 2, 2022, to November 19, 2022.

Billboard named Tems the US top Afrobeats Artist of 2022, making her the first African artist to achieve this honor. Tems placed ten songs on the list, with one featured song being the highest ranked of them by Wizkid titled "Essence", placed at number one. Essence features guest vocals from Justin Bieber and Tems. The song became the first Nigerian song in history to chart on the Hot 100 chart.

== Year-end list ==
List of songs on Billboard's 2022 Year-End U.S. Afrobeats Songs chart.
No.	Title	Artist(s)
1	"Essence"	Wizkid featuring Justin Bieber and Tems
2	"Peru"	Fireboy DML and Ed Sheeran
3	"Love Nwantiti (Ah Ah Ah)"	CKay
4	"Free Mind"	Tems
5	"Last Last"	Burna Boy
6	"Calm Down"	Rema and Selena Gomez
7	"Higher"	Tems
8	"Finesse"	Pheelz and Buju
9	"For My Hand"	Burna Boy featuring Ed Sheeran
10	"Found"	Tems featuring Brent Faiyaz
11	"Ku Lo Sa"	Oxlade
12	"Jerusalema"	Master KG featuring Burna Boy and Nomcebo Zikode
13	"Attention"	Omah Lay and Justin Bieber
14	"Ye"	Burna Boy
15	"Sungba"	Asake featuring Burna Boy
16	"Damages	Tems
17	"It's Plenty"	Burna Boy
18	"Kweku The Traveler"	Black Sherif
19	"Emiliana"	CKay
20	"Love Me Back (Fayahh Beat)"	Trinidad Cardona and Robinson
21	"Peace Be Unto You (PBUY)"	Asake
22	"Replay"	Tems
23	"On The Low"	Burna Boy
24	"Playboy"	Fireboy DML
25	"Sugarcane"	Camidoh featuring Phantom
26	"The Key"	Tems
27	"Terminator"	Asake
28	"Monalisa"	Lojay, Sarz and Chris Brown
29	"Buga"	Kizz Daniel featuring Tekno
30	"Ice T"	Tems
31	"Solid"	Burna Boy featuring Kehlani and Blxst
32	"Rover"	S1mba featuring DTG
33	"Overloading (Overdose)"	The Mavins
34	"Palazzo"	Spinall and Asake
35	"Understand"	Omah Lay
36	"Ameno Amapiano (You Wanna Bamba)"	Goya Menor and Nektunez
37	"Bad to Me"	Wizkid
38	"Organise"	Asake
39	"Girlfriend"	Ruger
40	"Fall"	Davido
41	"Rush"	Ayra Starr
42	"Joha"	Asake
43	"Crazy Tings"	Tems
44	"I'm a Mess"	Omah Lay
45	"Soundgasm"	Rema
46	"Electricity"	Pheelz and Davido
47	"Toni-Ann Singh"	Burna Boy featuring Popcaan
48	"No Woman, No Cry"	Tems
49	"Sip (Alcohol)"	Joeboy
50	"Omo Ope"	Asake and Olamide
51	"Dull"	Asake
52	"Different Size"	Burna Boy featuring Vict0ny
53	"Common Person"	Burna Boy
54	"Ginger"	WizKid featuring Burna Boy
55	"Woman"	Omah Lay
56	"Nzaza"	Asake
57	"Cloak & Dagger"	Burna Boy featuring J Hus
58	"N'Y Pense Plus"	Tayc
59	"Soweto"	Victony and Tempoe
60	"Ototo"	Asake
61	"B. D'or"	Burna Boy and Wizkid
62	"Baddest Boy"	Skiibii and Davido
63	"Jireh (My Provider) (Remix)"	Limoblaze, Lecrae and Happi
64	"High"	Adekunle Gold and Davido
65	"Dupe"	Asake
66	"Stand Strong"	Davido featuring Sunday Service Choir
67	"Dada"	Young Jonn featuring Davido
68	"Vanilla"	Burna Boy
69	"No Wahala"	1Da Banton featuring Kizz Daniel and Tiwa Savage
70	"Infinity"	Olamide
71	"Science"	Burna Boy
72	"Loving You"	Zinoleesky
73	"Cough (Odo)"	Kizz Daniel
74	"No Wahala"	1Da Banton
75	"Jagele"	Burna Boy
76	"Xtra Cool"	Young Jonn
77	"Rollercoaster"	Burna Boy featuring J Balvin
78	"Philo"	Bella Shmurda and Omah Lay
79	"Kilometre"	Burna Boy
80	"Joro"	Wizkid
81	"Muse"	Asake
82	"Wild Dreams"	Burna Boy featuring Khalid
83	"Reason"	Asake featuring Russ
84	"Down Flat"	Kelvyn Boy
85	"Dirty Secrets"	Burna Boy
86	"Love Don't Cost a Dime"	Magixx
87	"Always"	Darkoo featuring Black Sherif
88	"Interference"	Tems
89	"Machala"	Carterefe and Berri-Tiga
90	"Soja"	Black Sherif
91	"Money & Love"	Wizkid
92	"In My Mind"	BNXN
93	"Whiskey"	Burna Boy
94	"Cold Outside"	Timaya
95	"Call Of Duty"	Zinoleesky
96	"Kilometer"	Buju
97	"Sempe"	L.A.X
98	"Ashawo"	Fireboy DML
99	"One And Only"	ASE
100	"Sunmomi"	Asake
