= Love and Light =

Love and Light may refer to:

- Love and Light (Proud Mary album) 2004
- Love and Light (Count Basic album), 2007
- Love & Light (Maddie & Tae album), 2025
- Love & Light (EP), a 2019 EP by Joeboy
- Love & Light, a 2011 perfume issued by the J.Lo by Jennifer Lopez brand
- Love and Light, a 2019 composition by Brian Balmages
