= Somewhere Between Beauty & Magic =

Studio album by Joeboy
- Released: 3 February 2021
- Genres: Afro pop; Afroswing
- Length: 42:01
- Languages: English; Nigerian Pidgin; Yoruba
- Labels: Banku Music; emPawa Africa
- Producers: E Kelly; Tempoe; Killertunes; Bigfish; Dëra; Mex Flairz; Semzi; Type A; BeatsByKO; M.O.G Beatz

Joeboy chronology
Love & Light (2019)	Somewhere Between Beauty & Magic (2021)	Body & Soul (2023)

Singles from Somewhere Between Beauty & Magic
- 1. "Call" Released: 10 April 2020; 2. "Lonely" Released: 9 October 2020; 3. "Celebration" Released: 9 December 2020

Somewhere Between Beauty & Magic is the debut studio album by Nigerian singer Joeboy. It was released on 3 February 2021, through Banku Music and emPawa Africa, and features a sole guest appearance from Kwesi Arthur on track 13. The album featured production from E Kelly, Tempoe, Killertunes, Bigfish, Dëra, Mex Flairz, Semzi, Type A, BeatsByKO and M.O.G Beatz. The album serves as a follow-up to his EP Love & Light (2019).

== Background and recording ==
Joeboy, who first gained attention through a cover of Ed Sheeran's "Shape of You" in 2017, rose to stardom with his 2019 hit "Baby," which gained traction in East Africa before becoming a success in Nigeria. Known for his catchy, short songs, Joeboy explained, "I genuinely do not care if it is one-minute... If it is sweet, it is sweet." His debut album Somewhere Between Beauty & Magic was inspired by a trip to Ghana and delayed due to the #EndSARS protests. Joeboy described the album as centered on love, "Love is beautiful. Love is magic." Joeboy recorded Somewhere Between Beauty & Magic over roughly five months, constantly refining the tracks by adding and removing elements. He sent his songs to a select group, including Mr Eazi, King Promise, Samuel, and Oxygen Mix, his mixing engineer, for feedback. The album was A&R'd by this team, with Joeboy stating, "I record a lot of songs and send them to a particular set of people to listen to." According to him, one of the most challenging tracks was "Show Me," as the original files disappeared during mastering, forcing him to re-record it and recapture the emotion.

== Singles ==
The album's lead single "Call" was released on 10 April 2020 and was produced by Dëra alongside a TG Omori-directed video. The album's second single "Lonely" was released on 9 October 2020 and was also produced by Dëra. At the time of the single's release, the album was expected to release on 30 October 2020 and the name hadn't been revealed. The third single "Celebration" was released on 9 December 2020 and was produced by Type A. Its music video coincided with the single's release and was directed by Dammy Twitch.

== Critical reception ==
Motolani Alake's review of Somewhere Between Beauty & Magic highlighted the album's strengths in catchy melodies and astute songwriting, particularly praising tracks like "Consent" and "OH," which he described as experiencing the album's "best spell." He noted, "Joeboy's music is a ready-made machine for high-calibre radio cruise," ultimately giving the album a rating of 7.0, categorizing it as a "Victory."

Dara Oluwatoye's review of Somewhere Between Beauty & Magic celebrated the album as "astounding" and a testament to Joeboy's undiluted sound, showcasing his ability to weave romantic tales throughout the 14-track project. She noted, "Joeboy was right to open the album with this song" referring to "Count Me Out," and highlighted the themes of love and ambition, ultimately expressing a deep admiration for the album's impactful storytelling.

== Track listing ==
Somewhere Between Beauty & Magic track listing
No.	Title	Writer(s)	Producer(s)	Length
1.	"Count Me Out"	Joseph Akinfenwa-Donus; Kevin Akpewe	BeatsByKO	1:48
2.	"Focus"	Akinfenwa-Donus; John Dosunmu-Mensah	M.O.G Beatz	2:32
3.	"Number One"	Akinfenwa-Donus; Faustina Mfinanga	BeatsByKO	3:39
4.	"Police"	Akinfenwa-Donus; Abayomi Ilerioluwa	Bigfish	3:09
5.	"Door"	Akinfenwa-Donus; Emmanuel Arthur; Nathan Otekalu-Aje	Tempoe	2:32
6.	"Show Me"	Akinfenwa-Donus; Ekeogu Samuel Chimezie	Mex Flairz	2:48
7.	"Runaway"	Akinfenwa-Donus; Akpewe; Emmanuel Nwosu	BeatsByKO; E Kelly	2:42
8.	"Lonely"	Akinfenwa-Donus; Odera Ezeani; Oluwaseun Otubela	Dëra	2:56
9.	"Consent"	Akinfenwa-Donus; Oluwasemilogo Banjo	Semzi	2:38
10.	"Call"	Akinfenwa-Donus; Ezeani	Dëra	2:45
11.	"Oshe"	Akinfenwa-Donus; Kelenna Agada	Type A; Dëra	2:13
12.	"Oh"	Akinfenwa-Donus; Otubela	Tempoe	2:49
13.	"Door" (remix; featuring Kwesi Arthur)	Akinfenwa-Donus; Arthur; Otekalu-Aje	Tempoe	2:32
14.	"Sugar Mama"	Akinfenwa-Donus; Otaniyen-Uwa Daniel	Killertunes	2:26
15.	"Better Thing"	Akinfenwa-Donus; Ezeani; Otubela	Dëra	2:50
16.	"Celebration"	Akinfenwa-Donus; Agada	Type A; Killertunes	2:50
Total length:				42:01

Apple Music bonus tracks
No.	Title	Film director(s)	Length
17.	"Becoming the African Pop Star" (documentary)	Adetula Adebowale	9:02

== Personnel ==
- Joseph "Joeboy" Akinfenwa-Donus – vocals, songwriter, executive producer
- Kevin "BeatsByKO" Akpewe – songwriter, producer
- John "M.O.G Beatz" Dosunmu-Mensah – songwriter, producer
- Faustina "Nandy" Mfinanga – songwriter
- Abayomi "Bigfish" Ilerioluwa – songwriter
- Emmanuel "Kwesi Arthur" Arthur – vocals, songwriter
- Nathan Otekalu-Aje – songwriter
- Ekeogu "Mex Flairz" Chimezie – songwriter, producer
- Emmanuel "E Kelly" Nwosu – songwriter, producer, mastering engineer, co-executive producer
- Chidera "Dëra" Ezeani – songwriter, producer
- Oluwaseun "Oxygen Mix" Otubela – songwriter, mixing engineer, mastering engineer
- Oluwasemilogo "Semzi" Banjo – songwriter, producer
- Kelenna "Type A" Agada – songwriter
- Otaniyen-Uwa "Killertunes" Daniel – songwriter, producer
- A.I.R - additional mixing engineer
- Oluwatosin "Mr Eazi" Ajibade - executive producer
- Bukunmi "Belly" Hafiz - co-executive producer
- Ikenna Nwagboso - executive producer

== Release history ==
Release history and formats for Somewhere Between Beauty & Magic
Region	Date	Format	Label
Various	3 February 2021	Streaming; digital download	Banku; emPawa Africa
