= Body & Soul (Joeboy album) =

Studio album by Joeboy
- Released: 19 May 2023
- Genres: Afropop; R&B; amapiano
- Length: 39:24
- Languages: English; Nigerian Pidgin; Yoruba
- Label: emPawa Africa
- Producers: E Kelly; Timmy; Kemena; Yung Willis; BeatsbyKO; K-Note; Tytanium; Type A; Tempoe; Dëra; Bigfish; Kahren

Joeboy chronology
Somewhere Between Beauty & Magic (2021)	Body & Soul (2023)	Body, Soul & Spirit (2023)

Singles from Body & Soul
- 1. "Sip (Alcohol)" Released: 24 September 2021; 2. "Contour" Released: 19 August 2022; 3. "Body & Soul" Released: 20 January 2023; 4. "Duffel Bag" Released: 7 April 2023

Body & Soul is the second studio album by Nigerian afro pop singer Joeboy. It was released on 19 May 2023, through emPawa Africa, and features guest appearances from Odumodublvck, CKay, Bnxn, Oxlade, Oli Ekun, Kemena, Tempoe, and Ludacris. Production was handled by Tempoe, Kahren, Kemena, Yung Willis, Type A, BeatsbyKO, Timmy, E Kelly, Bigfish, Tytanium, K-Note, and Dëra. The album serves as a follow-up to Somewhere Between Beauty & Magic (2021).

== Background and recording ==
Joeboy admitted to OkayAfrica that Body and Soul took about a year to complete. He explained that he recorded many songs during that period and later realized they could form an album, adding that he prefers recording without rules because he likes to "record freely" and believes it is "the best way to be creative". Joeboy also described the project as more mature and "less innocent" than his debut album. He said the title reflects the sincerity of the music, explaining that the songs come from "a very sincere and honest place" and that the music comes from his "body and [his] soul." The album also includes collaborations with several artists, including a track with Ludacris, which came to be after they met during Joeboy's tour and later recorded songs together.

== Singles ==
The album spawned four singles. The album's lead single "Sip (Alcohol)" was released on 24 September 2021, marking his first release since his debut album, Somewhere Between Beauty & Magic (2021). The song blends Afrobeats and amapiano over production from Tempoe. The second single off the album, "Contour", was released on 19 August 2022; the song was produced by Tempoe. "Body & Soul", the album's title track, was released as the album's third single on 20 January 2023. It was produced by E Kelly. The fourth and final single "Duffel Bag" was released on 7 April 2023 alongside its Buhari Yesufu-directed music video and was produced by E Kelly and Timmy.

== Critical reception ==
Professional ratings
Review scores
Source	Rating
The Native	6.9/10
Afrocritik	7.3/10
Premium Times	8.5/10
Pulse Nigeria	8.5/10

The album received generally positive reviews from critics. Pulse Nigeria writer Adeayo Adebiyi described Body and Soul as a "soothing body of work" that balances Joeboy's style with "mainstream appeal", adding that it achieves "impressive sonic and thematic coherence" and makes for a "comprehensive and enjoyable listening experience". He rated the album 8.5 out of 10 and called it "the best Nigerian album of 2023."

Solution Emmanuel of Premium Times characterized the album as a "captivating blend of infectious melodies, heartfelt lyrics, and mesmerising vocals", writing that Joeboy "effortlessly transcended boundaries" while refining his sound and exploring new styles. Emmanuel awarded Body and Soul a rating of 8.5 out of 10, concluding that the project reinforces Joeboy's position as "one of Africa's most promising musical ambassadors."

Afrocritik's Yinoluwa Olowofoyeku wrote that Body and Soul delivers "enjoyable tracks that are fun to listen to", giving a familiar experience built on Joeboy's style, though he noted the album shows limited growth and stays within the singer’s comfort zone. Olowofoyeku said that "the album does do the job" and rated it 7.3 out of 10. Uzoma Ihejirika of The Native called the album "an endeavour of artistic growth" and "a much improved and better-realised version" of Joeboy. He added that the album "does a much better job" than his debut and "highlights Joeboy's maturity and growth as an artist." Ihejirika rated it 6.9 out of 10.

== Track listing ==
Body & Soul track listing
No.	Title	Writer(s)	Producer(s)	Length
1.	"Normally" (featuring Bnxn and Odumodublvck)	Joseph Akinfenwa-Donus; Daniel Benson; Tochukwu Ojogwu; Kevin Akpewe; Ilerioluwa Abayomi	BeatsbyKO; Bigfish	3:24
2.	"Body & Soul"	Akinfenwa-Donus; Emmanuel Nwosu; Samuel Adetiloye; Wade Oghenejabor	E Kelly	2:34
3.	"Check My Phone"	Akinfenwa-Donus; Taiwo Ojekunle; Odera Ezeani	Tytanium; Dëra	2:44
4.	"Lose Ya"	Akinfenwa-Donus; Momoh Oshiotseameh Luke; Oghenejabor; Nwosu	E Kelly	2:00
5.	"Duffel Bag"	Akinfenwa-Donus; Oghenejabor; Adetiloye; Luke; Nwosu	Timmy; E Kelly	2:07
6.	"Contour"	Akinfenwa-Donus; Michael Alagwu; Ekene Nkemena	Tempoe	3:09
7.	"Interlude" (featuring Oli Ekun)	Akinfenwa-Donus; Olubiyi Oluwatobiloba; Nkemena	Kemena	1:23
8.	"Wetin Be Love" (featuring CKay)	Akinfenwa-Donus; Chukwuka Ekweani; Nonso Amadi; Oghenejabor; Luke; Ezeani	Nonso Amadi; Dëra	2:35
9.	"Woman" (featuring Oxlade)	Akinfenwa-Donus; Olaitan Abdulrahman; Daniel Williams; Victor Nanribetmun	Yung Willis	3:21
10.	"Chicken, Spice & Curry" (featuring Ludacris)	Akinfenwa-Donus; Christopher Bridges; Kelenna Agada; Luke	Type A	1:57
11.	"Better" (featuring Tempoe)	Akinfenwa-Donus; Alagwu; Oluwaseun Otubela	Tempoe	3:21
12.	"Sip (Alcohol)"	Akinfenwa-Donus; Alagwu; Derick Obuobie Jr.	Tempoe	2:38
13.	"Slowly"	Akinfenwa-Donus; Kingsley Okorie; Karen Chisom; Ezeani	K-Note; Kahren; Dëra	2:46
14.	"The Best For You" (featuring Kemena)	Akinfenwa-Donus; Nkemena	Kemena	2:52
15.	"Halle"	Akinfenwa-Donus; Adetiloye; Luke; Nwosu	E Kelly; Timmy	2:28
Total length:				39:24

== Personnel ==
- Joseph "Joeboy" Akinfenwa-Donus – vocals, songwriter
- Olaitan "Oxlade" Abdulrahman - vocals, songwriter
- Chukwuka "CKay" Ekweani - vocals, songwriter
- Daniel "Bnxn" Benson - vocals, songwriter
- Christopher "Ludacris" Bridges - vocals, songwriter
- Olubiyi "Oli Ekun" Oluwatobiloba - vocals, songwriter
- Tochukwu "Odumodublvck" Ojogwu - vocals, songwriter
- Ekene "Kemena" Nkemena - vocals, songwriter, producer
- Michael "Tempoe" Alagwu - featured artist, songwriter, producer, mixing engineer
- Daniel "Yung Willis" Williams - producer, songwriter
- Chidera "Dëra" Ezeani - producer, songwriter
- Emmanuel "E Kelly" Nwosu - producer, songwriter
- Kelenna "Type A" Agada - producer, songwriter
- Karen "Kahren" Chisom - producer, songwriter
- Taiwo "Tytanium" Ojekunle - producer, songwriter
- Kingsley "K-Note" Okorie - producer, songwriter
- Kevin "BeatsbyKO" Akpewe - producer, songwriter
- Nonso Amadi - producer, songwriter
- Momoh "KvngVidarr" Luke - songwriter
- Victor "Lucid" Nanribetmun - songwriter
- Wade Oghenejabor - songwriter
- Derick "J.Derobie" Obuobie Jr. - songwriter
- Oluwaseun "Oxygen Mix" Otubela - mixing engineer, mastering engineer
- Michael "Syn X" Nwachukwu – mastering engineer

== Release history ==
Release history and formats for Body & Soul
Region	Date	Format	Label
Various	19 May 2023	Streaming; digital download	emPawa Africa
