= Khaid =

Nigerian singer and rapper

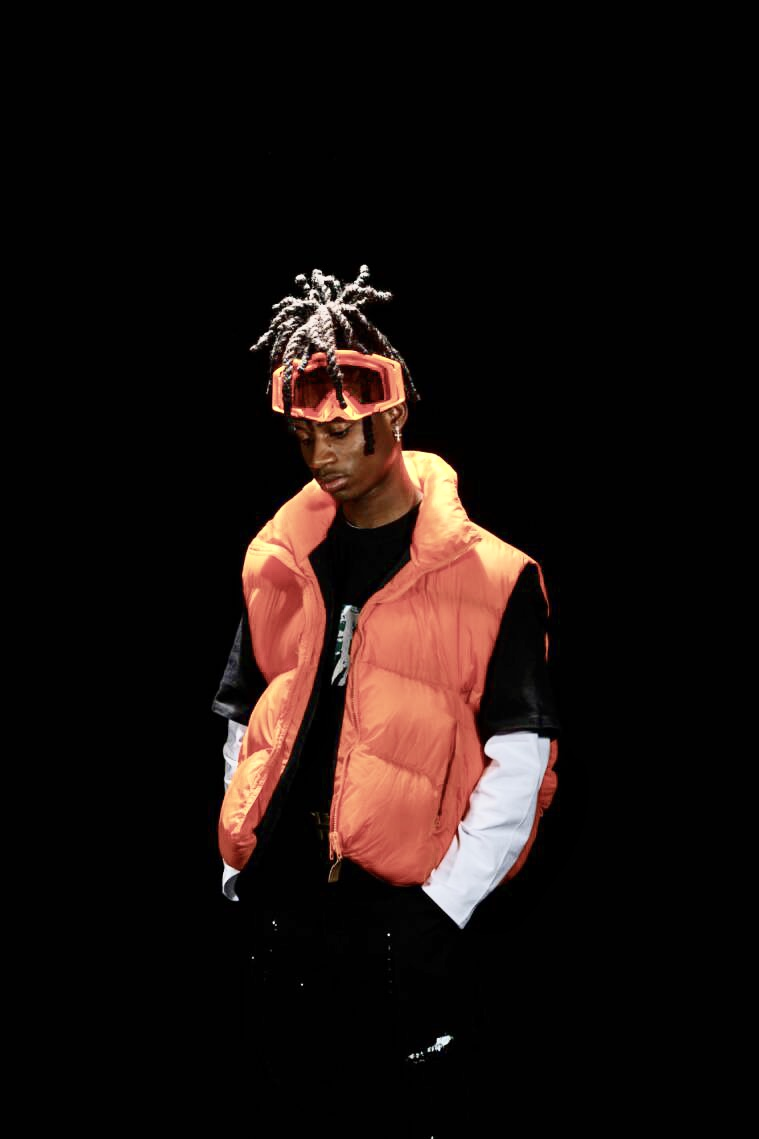

Background information
- Also known as: Shekoni
- Born: Sulaimon Shekoni Solomon; 10 December 2004 (age 21); Shibiri-Lagos
- Genres: Afropop; Afro-trap; R&B
- Occupations: Singer; rapper; songwriter
- Years active: 2022–present
- Label: Neville Records

Sulaimon Shekoni Solomon, known professionally as Khaid, is a Nigerian singer, songwriter and rapper currently signed to Neville Records. He rose to stardom with the release of the song "With You" after signing a record deal with Sydney Talker's Neville Records in 2022, which earned him his first chart entry on Nigeria TurnTable Top 50 single chart at number forty-eight on 14 February 2022. Khaid converted to Christianity after leaving Islam.

== Early life ==
Sulaimon Shekoni Abiola grew up in Shibiri-Ojo, and is from a family of ten. Sulaimon worked as a roadside mechanic in the street of Ojo fixing vehicles, to earn a living to support his family, and to be able to fund his music career.

== Career ==
He started his music career in the street of Ojo. In 2021, Khaid posted a viral freestyle on Instagram that caught the attention of Sydney Talker who offered him a recording deal and introduced him to the public on 20 January 2022 as Sydney's Neville Records' first artist. He went on to release his first single "With You" on 28 January 2022, which peaked at number 48 in Nigeria TurnTable chart. Its accompanying music video was directed by Olu the Wave and currently has 4.1 million views on YouTube, as of February 2023.

On 22 April 2022, he released "SKI", with its music video directed by Sydney Talker. According to The Native author Wonu Osikoya, “Ski" Paints An Honest Picture Of His Life Before Fame”. On 27 May 2022, Khaid released his six-track debut extended play Diversity (stylized as DIVERSITY). Reviewing for The Native, Wonu Osikoya called the EP “A collage of vibrant sounds that will appeal to the young and the young-at-heart”. On 4 June 2022, Khaid lead Pulse Nigeria Future Sounds Vol.10 playlist with his single "With You",

On 22 June 2022, he was named Apple Music’s Up Next Artist for Nigeria. On 2 August 2022, he reveals how a DM from Sydney Talker changed his life, during an interview on the Midday Show with Do2tun, and Eve on Cool FM 96.9 Lagos. On 9 November 2022, he released "Amala", which became his much-anticipated single after his freestyle became viral on Instagram, and TikTok. "Amala" features guest vocals from Zlatan, and Rexxie, who also serves as the producer. Its accompanying visualizer, directed by Sydney Talker.

On 14 November 2022, "Amala" debuted at number 91 on the official Nigeria TurnTable Top 100 songs, number 66 on Top Streaming Songs, and number 24 on Top Street-POP Songs. On 20 January 2023, "Jolie" debuted at number 92 on the official Nigeria TurnTable Top 100 songs, and was released for digital streaming on 25 January 2023, and was named one of the Best Afrobeats Songs out right now by OkayAfrica. On 30 January 2023, he ranked at number 1 on TurnTable's NXT Emerging Top Artistes.

On 31 January 2023, Spotify cited him as one of the emerging artists to look out for from Nigeria, alongside Tempoe and Poco Lee. On 13 February 2023, "Jolie" peaked at number 7 on the official Nigeria TurnTable Top 100 songs. On 14 February 2023, Sydney Talker shares a screenshot of his Instagram DM, where Davido leaves a remark on "Jolie", which reads “I have played this song like 100 times in my house”. On 18 February 2023, "Jolie" ranked at number 5 on TheCable's list of 10 TCL radio pick of the week. ‘Anabella video was released on the 24th of July and directed by The Peacock. And in 2024 He released Orobo which became an House hold favorite and now he is set to release beku which fans are hyper and can’t was to listen as he shared a snippet on is socials and The song is among his most use on TikTok .

== Discography ==
=== EPs ===
List of studio extended plays, with selected details and chart positions
Title	Details	Peak chart positions
Title	Details	NG
DIVERSITY	Released: 27 May 2022; Label: Neville Records; Formats: Digital download	
Emotions	Released: 1 September 2023; Label: Neville Records; Formats: Digital download	

==== As lead artist ====
List of singles as lead artist, with year released and album shown
Title	Year	Peak chart positions						Certifications	Album
Title	Year	NG	NG Afropop	SA	UK	UK Afrobeats	US Afrobeats	Certifications	Album
"With You"	2022	48	—	—	—	—	—		DIVERSITY
"SKI"	2022	—	—	—	—	—	—		DIVERSITY
"Amala"	2022	91	—	—	—	—	—		TBA
"Jolie"	2023	7	6	—	—	—	—	TCSN: Platinum	Emotions
"Carry Me Go" (with. Boy Spyce)	2023	8	8	—	—	12	44	TCSN: Platinum	TBA
"Anabella"	2023	2	1	—	—	—	—		Emotions
"Forever "	2023	—	—	—	—	—	—		
"Marry" featuring Shallipopi	2023	—	—	—	—	—		TBA	

== Accolades ==
Year	Awards ceremony	Award description(s)	Nominated work	Results
2023	The Headies	Rookie of the Year	Himself	Nominated
