= Outlaw (EP) =

EP by Victony
- Released: 6 May 2022
- Genre: Afropop
- Length: 20:35
- Label: Encore Recordings
- Producer: Blaisebeatz; P.Priime; Blind; Tempoe; Ktizo; Dëra; Frank Moses

Victony chronology
Saturn (2021)	Outlaw (2022)	Stubborn (2024)

Singles from Outlaw
- 1. "Apollo" Released: 11 March 2022; 2. "Kolomental" Released: 28 April 2022; 3. "Soweto" Released: 22 October 2022

Outlaw is the second EP by Nigerian singer Victony. It was released on 6 May 2022, by Encore Recordings and features producers Ktizo and Tempoe. Production was handled by Ktizo, Tempoe, Blaisebeatz, P.Priime, Dëra, Frank Moses, and Blind. The album housed the singles "Apollo," "Kolomental," and "Soweto."

== Background and recording ==
Victony began working on Outlaw in mid-2020. The title track took the longest to complete and was chosen as the opener because, in his words, "it embodies the right emotions for this project" and tells his story as an "outlaw." "Chop & Slide" and "Apollo" came together quickly and relied on instinct. About "Chop & Slide", Victony said, "Regardless of what anybody has to say, I'm going to finish this record". The EP was initially set to feature six tracks, but "All Power" was added last-minute, with Victony saying. He described the session for the sleeper hit "Soweto" as "one of the laziest" he'd ever had.

== Singles ==
The EP's lead single "Apollo" was released on 11 March 2022. The song was produced by P.Priime. The Blaisebeatz-produced second single "Kolomental" was released on 28 April 2022. The third and final single, "Soweto," was released on 22 October 2022 alongside a Jyde Ajala-directed video. It was produced by Tempoe and got two remixes, one released on 28 April 2023 featuring Omah Lay, and another released on 22 March 2023 featuring Don Toliver and Rema. Rolling Stone ranked it #15 on their list of "The 40 Best Afropop Songs of 2022."

== Critical reception ==
Professional ratings
Review scores
Source	Rating
Pulse Nigeria	7.6/10
Afrocritik	6.5/10
iMullar	4/5 stars

Adeayo Adebiyi of Pulse Nigeria praised Victony's Outlaw EP as a solid project, highlighting its melodious nature and strong singing but noting it didn't break new ground, stating, "'Outlaw' delivers on all expectations but doesn't do much beyond that." He rated the EP 7.6/10, classifying it as a "Victory."

Emmanuel Esomnofu of OkayAfrica praised Outlaw as a showcase of Victony's evolving artistry, highlighting his "sonic brilliance" and the project's mix of introspective lyrics and lush beats, stating, "With seven songs he's pulled off a masterstroke of a project."

Chinonso Ihekire of Afrocritik described Outlaw as a "wholesome project" with "strong replay value, feel-good instrumentation, and... suggestive thematic compass," though he noted that it lacked the songwriting depth to elevate it to a classic. He gave the project a rating of 6.5/10.

The team at The Native offered high praise for Victony's Outlaw EP, with Dennis calling it "one of the best projects of 2022" and highlighting its "multi-coloured, multi-layered slabs of excellence" in production. Wonu noted Victony's confidence and organization, saying "there's a different experience with every listen," while Emmanuel emphasized Victony's ability to "sound fresh each time" and praised the EP's balance of introspection and catchy, well-written tracks.

Bomi Anifowose, writing for Digimillenials described Victony's Outlaw EP as a diverse blend of emotional storytelling and club-ready tracks, with highlights like "Outlaw" showcasing his lyrical depth, and "Apollo" praised as an "Amapiano madness." Anifowose noted the project's mix of soulful and vibrant songs, such as "Kolomental" and "All Power," which deliver both introspection and catchy grooves.

Jubril Lawal of The Upper Entertainment highlighted Outlaw as a significant exploration of relationships and mental health, capturing the artist's struggle for authenticity amidst external pressures. Lawal noted that while the album successfully blends club-ready tracks like "Apollo" with introspective themes, particularly in the closing track "Kolomental," he felt Victony could further delve into his personal feelings.

Agwuma Kingsley of Morebranches described Victony's Outlaw EP as a showcase of his vocal talent and lyrical prowess, emphasizing the artist's versatility across the seven tracks. Kingsley pointed out standout songs like "Jolene" and "Kolomental," noting that while the themes were somewhat sparse, Victony's creativity shone through, particularly in celebrating his journey and the grace he attributes to God.

Edwin Quartey of iMullar rated Victony's Outlaw EP 4/5, praising it as a testament to the artist's resilience and growth following a traumatic accident. Quartey noted, "Outlaw is like a musical document of Victony's quest," highlighting the project's emotional depth and diverse soundscapes, particularly in standout tracks like "Apollo" and "Kolomental," which blend personal pain with impressive production.

== Track listing ==
Credits adapted from back cover.
No.	Title	Writer(s)	Producer(s)	Length
1.	"Outlaw"	Anthony Victor	Ktizo	3:17
2.	"Chop & Slide"	Victor	Blind; Frank Moses; Dëra^{[b]}	2:48
3.	"Apollo"	Victor	P.Priime; Ktizo^{[b]}	2:50
4.	"All Power"	Victor	Ktizo	3:12
5.	"Jolene" (featuring Ktizo)	Victor	Ktizo	2:55
6.	"Soweto" (featuring Tempoe)	Victor; Michael Alagwu	Tempoe	2:28
7.	"Kolomental"	Victor	Blaisebeatz	3:17
Total length:				20:35

Notes

- ^{^[b]} signifies an co-producer.

== Personnel ==
- Anthony "Victony" Victor – vocals, songwriter, art direction
- Michael "Tempoe" Alagwu - featured artist, songwriter, producer
- Chuma "Hoodini" Nwokike - featured artist, producer, A&R, mixing engineer, mastering engineer
- Oluseni "IamDJNotorious" Oyinlola (Ktizo) - featured artist, producer
- Chidera "Dëra" Ezeani – producer
- Blind - producer
- Frank Moses - producer
- Marcel "Blaisebeatz" Akunwata - producer
- Deep Music - choir (tracks 1, 3, 5)
- Enoch Akinyele - guitars (track 5)
- Alberto Faraggi Elizalde - guitars (track 5)
- Loren Ewailfo - whistle (track 5)
- Jemedafe "Partyboy" Caleb - A&R, executive producer
- Bolthedesigner - art direction
- Jexways - art direction

== Release history ==
Release history and formats for Outlaw
Region	Date	Format	Label
Various	6 May 2022	Streaming; digital download	Encore Recordings
