= Viva Lavida =

Studio album by Joeboy
- Released: 28 March 2025
- Genres: Afro-fusion, R&B
- Length: 33:59
- Labels: Young Legend; WMA
- Producers: Joeboy (exec.); Tempoe (exec.); Deola A. Jaiyesimi (exec.); Oxygenmix (exec.); Xtofa; Prestige; Kemena; K-Dreamz; DEBO; Tudor Monroe; T.U.C; Semzi; Dera The Boy; Type A

Joeboy chronology
Body, Soul & Spirit (2023)	Viva Lavida (2025)

Singles from Viva Lavida
- 1. "Osadebe" Released: 16 February 2024; 2. "Adenuga" Released: 17 April 2024; 3. "SMH" Released: 7 February 2025; 4. "Taxi Driver" Released: 6 March 2025

Viva Lavida is the third studio album by Nigerian singer Joeboy. It was released on 28 March 2025 through Young Legend and exclusively licensed to Warner Music Africa. The album included guest appearances from Qing Madi, Tempoe, Elana Dara, Olamide, and Wizard Chan. On 26 March 2025, he released the album tracklist.

== Background ==
On 2 February 2024, Joeboy announced the launch of his label Young Legend in partnership with Warner Music Africa. On 21 March 2025, Joeboy told Nandi Madida in an interview on Apple Music 1's Africa Now Radio show, about the title of the album, saying, “One of my guys started giving me the nickname ‘Lavida Boy’ so I started building on the concept from there. I started having Lavida sessions, and there's going to be Lavida Festival soon!.” On Friday, 21 March 2025, Joeboy held an album listening session at La Madison Centre in Lagos. He gave a detailed account of each song on the album and signed an autograph for each guest.

On 27 March 2025, Joeboy said in an interview with OkayAfrica music journalist Nelson C.J, that “There's a way you tap into emotion, and it just really helps with your writing. When you go deep, there are some lyrics that you never knew you had [in you] that come out.”, he further said “freedom was the primary theme. "Freedom in the context of being able to express vulnerability, and there's also the introspective part with songs like 'Sinner,' 'I'll Be Okay,' and 'Hey Father.” On 28 March 2025, when asked in an interview the meaning of Viva Lavida, he tells MoreBranches without hesitation, “Freedom to express, to be vulnerable, and to experiment.”

== Singles and promotion ==
On 16 February 2024, Joeboy released the first single titled "Osadebe". On 17 April 2024, he released a 2-pack single, which includes the second lead single titled "Adenuga" featuring Qing Madi. On 7 February 2025, he released the third single titled "SMH" featuring Tempoe. On 6 March 2025, Joeboy released the fourth single "Taxi Driver", and announce his third studio album Viva Lavida to be released on 28 March.

== Track listing ==
Viva Lavida
No.	Title	Writer(s)	Producer(s)	Length
1.	"Innocent"	Joseph Akinwale Akinfenwa-Donus; Ekene Nkemena; Alagwu Michael Chigozie	Kemena; Tempoe	2:24
2.	"Abena"	Joseph Akinfenwa-Donus; Ekene Nkemena; Alagwu Michael Chigozie	DEBO; Tempoe	2:20
3.	"Streets Are Lonely"	Joseph Akinfenwa-Donus; Ekene Nkemena; Alagwu Michael Chigozie	Kemena; Tempoe	2:31
4.	"Taxi Driver"	Joseph Akinfenwa-Donus; Alagwu Michael Chigozie; Christopher Ebuka Mbah; Eyiaromi Daniel Adetokunbo	Tempoe; Xtofa	2:36
5.	"SMH" (with Tempoe)	Joseph Akinfenwa-Donus; Alagwu Michael Chigozie	Tempoe	3:23
6.	"Magdalene"	Joseph Akinfenwa-Donus; Alagwu Michael Chigozie	Tempoe	2:24
7.	"Sunset" (with Elana Dara)	Joseph Akinfenwa-Donus; Elana Dara; Tudor Moroe	Tudor Monroe	2:39
8.	"Adenuga" (feat. Qing Madi)	Joseph Akinfenwa-Donus; Chimamanda Pearl Chukwuma; Momoh Oshiotseameh Luke; King David Agene	Prestige	3:06
9.	"Free of Charge" (with Olamide)	Joseph Akinfenwa-Donus; Olamide Gbenga Adedeji; Chibuzor Franklin Amajuoyi; Hyacinth Obidi Mgbeafuluba; Nnamdi Kenedy Amajuoyi; Fortune Ohiza	T.U.C	2:53
10.	"Osadebe"	Joseph Akinfenwa-Donus; Eyiaromi Daniel Adetokunbo; K-Dreamz	K-Dreamz	2:36
11.	"Hey Father"	Joseph Akinfenwa-Donus; Banjo Oluwasemilogo	Semzi	2:16
12.	"Sinner"	Joseph Akinfenwa-Donus; Kelenna Agada	Type A	2:27
13.	"I'll Be Okay" (with Wizard Chan)	Joseph Akinfenwa-Donus; Fuayefika Maxwell; Odera Godfrey	Dera The Boy	2:24
Total length:				33:59

== Personnel ==
- Joseph Akinfenwa-Donus – vocals, writing, executive producer
- Alagwu "Tempoe" Chigozie - vocals, production, writing, AnR, exe. producer
- Deola A. Jaiyesimi - executive producer
- Oxygenmix - mixing, AnR, executive producer
- Christopher "Xtofa" Mbah - production, writing
- King "Prestige" Agene - production, writing
- Eyiaromi "Romi" Adetokunbo - writing
- K-Dreanz - production, writing
- Elana Dara - vocals, writing
- Momoh "Kvng Vidarr" Luke - writing
- Gbenga "Olamide" Adedeji - vocal, writing
- Fuayefika "Wizard Chan" Maxwell - vocal, writing
- T.U.C - production, mixing
- Kemena - production, writing
- DEBO - production
- Tudor Monroe - production, writing
- Semzi - production, writing
- Dera The Boy - production, writing
- Type A - production, writing
- Fortune Ohiza - writing
- Romi - writing
- Kvng Vidarr - writing
- Boybreed (Nnamdi Kenedy Amajuoyi, Chibuzor Franklin Amajuoyi) - writing
- SynX - mixing
- Bidemi Tata - creative direction
- Royd Ringdahi - creative direction

== Charts ==
Chart performance for Viva Lavida
Chart (2025)	Peak position
Nigerian Albums (TurnTable)	8

== Release history ==
Release history and formats for Viva Lavida
Region	Date	Format	Label
Various	28 March 2025	Streaming; digital download	Young Legend, Warner Music Africa
