= Body, Soul & Spirit =

EP by Joeboy
- Released: 17 November 2023
- Genre: Afro pop
- Length: 13:04
- Label: emPawa Africa
- Producers: Debox; BeatsbyKO; Black Culture

Joeboy chronology
Body & Soul (2023)	Body, Soul & Spirit (2023)	Viva Lavida (2025)

Singles from Body, Soul & Spirit
- 1. "Only God Can Save Me" Released: 3 November 2023

Body, Soul & Spirit is the second EP by Nigerian singer Joeboy. It was released on 17 November 2023 through emPawa Africa. Production was handled by Debox, BeatsbyKO, and Black Culture. It serves a follow-up to Body & Soul (2023).

== Background and singles ==
The EP's announcement coincided with the release of its only single, "Only God Can Save Me," which was released on 3 November 2023. It was produced by Debox.

== Composition ==
The EP begins with "Only God Can Save Me," featuring minimalistic production with wailing synths and simple instrumental arrangements. Joeboy's lyrics express vulnerability as he reflects on life's challenges. "24/7" introduces a more upbeat tempo with celebratory drums and triumphant guitar chords, and conveys a sense of determination and resilience. In "Telephone," Joeboy sings about the positive influence of a lover, accompanied by romantic, heartfelt instrumentation. "Enemy" addresses the complexities of a strained relationship, with strummed guitars and a dancehall-inspired drumline. The EP concludes with "Surviving," where Joeboy's lyrics and melodies focus on themes of recovery and moving forward. The sparse instrumentation highlights his vocal performance.

== Critical reception ==
Professional ratings
Review scores
Source	Rating
Afrocritik	6.7/10
Pulse Nigeria	8/10
Album Talks	7.2/10

Adeayo Adebiyi of Pulse Nigeria highlighted that Body, Soul & Spirit provided an intimate exploration into Joeboy's personal and romantic relationships. Adebiyi praised the EP for its honest and heartfelt approach, particularly in the tracks "Only God Can Save Me" and "24/7", showcasing Joeboy's emotional range and ability to create relatable music. He gave the EP an 8/10, concluding, "At a time when most Nigerian consumers are spent and can't be bothered with long-form projects, this EP is a suitable offering from an artist who keeps giving his best," reflecting the genuine and raw nature of the EP.

Yinoluwa Olowofoyeku of Afrocritik noted that Body, Soul, & Spirit built upon the themes of his previous work, Body & Soul (2023) with more emotionally engaging production. While he praised Joeboy's vocal performance and emotional depth, he mentioned that the EP was somewhat let down by lackluster lyrics and engineering. The EP received a 6.7/10, with Olowofoyeku asserting, "Body, Soul, & Spirit comes together as advertised—feeling like an extension of the package that was Body & Soul."

TJ Martins of Album Talks observed that Body, Soul & Spirit extended Body & Soul, providing deeper introspection into themes of mental health, grief, and self-loathing. Martins mentioned that the minimalistic production persisted as a drawback but appreciated the EP as a standalone work of quality music. He noted, "Body, Soul & Spirit sheds off the layers and offers an even deeper introspection into the album’s themes." Martins rated the EP 7.2 out of 10.

== Track listing ==
Body, Soul & Spirit track listing
No.	Title	Writer(s)	Producer(s)	Length
1.	"Only God Can Save Me"	Joseph Akinfenwa-Donus; Agunbiade Adebola	Debox	2:58
2.	"24/7"	Akinfenwa-Donus; Joseph Oluwafemi; Momoh Luke	Black Culture	2:26
3.	"Telephone"	Akinfenwa-Donus; Luke; Agunbiade Adebola	Debox	2:24
4.	"Enemy"	Akinfenwa-Donus; Oluwadamilare Aderibigbe; Nwaigwe Figo; Kevin Akpewe	BeatsbyKO	2:38
5.	"Surviving"	Akinfenwa-Donus; Ekene Nkemena; Adebola	Debox	2:37
Total length:				13:04

== Personnel ==
- Joseph Akinfenwa-Donus – vocals, writing
- Agunbiade "Debox" Adebola – production, writing
- Kevin "BeatsbyKO" Akpewe - production, writing
- Joseph "Black Culture" Oluwafemi - production, writing
- Momoh Luke - writing
- Oluwadamilare Aderibigbe - writing
- Nwaigwe Figo - writing
- Ekene Nkemena - writing

== Release history ==
Release history and formats for Body, Soul & Spirit
Region	Date	Format	Label
Various	17 November 2023	Streaming; digital download	emPawa Africa
