= Sydney Talker =

Nigerian actor and comedian

- Born: Sydney Egere Talker; 26 January 1996; Delta State, Nigeria
- Education: University of Benin (UNIBEN)

Comedy career
- Years active: 2016–present
- Medium: Film; Director; Actor; Content Creator
- Website: Sydney Talker on YouTube

Sydney Egere (born 26 January 1996), professionally known as Sydney Talker, is a Nigerian media personality, comedian and actor. He is the founder and CEO of Neville Records, and nominated for the 25 Under 25 Award organized by SME100 Africa.

== Early life and education ==
Born in Delta State, Nigeria and raised by a single mother, Talker received his primary and secondary education in Benin. He then went on to acquire a bachelor's degree in computer science from the University of Benin.

== Career ==
Talker's career started in 2016, by creating and uploading comedy skits on his social media channels, especially Instagram. His comedy skit "The Poor Power Supply" gained him fame in 2016. He was nominated in the 2020 edition of the 25 Under 25 Awards organized by SME100 Africa. Talker also starred in the Nollywood musical film LOUD (2020). He was dubbed the Nigerian Mr Bean and has been frequently referred to as the Towel Guy.

On 20 January 2022, Talker announced the launch of his record label, Neville Records, in an Instagram post. He also unveiled his first signing Khaid on the same day. Khaid released his first major debut single, "With You", on 28 January 2022. Khaid's debut EP, DIVERSITY, followed thereafter in May of that year. Khaid released his second EP Emotions, in September the following year.

== Filmography ==
- Obara'M (2022) as T-clef

== Criticism ==
Talker has been criticized on social media for conniving with fellow skit maker Carter Efe to claim ownership of Berri Tiga's song by trying to pay him off.
