= Machala (disambiguation) =

Machala is a city in south-west Ecuador.

Machala may also refer to:

- Machala Canton, a canton of Ecuador, located in the El Oro Province.
- Machala (song), song by Carter Efe and Beri Tiga.
- Oldřich Machala (born 1963), Czech football coach
- Roman Catholic Diocese of Machala.
- Our Lady of Mercy Cathedral, Machala.
