= SME100 Africa =

African entrepreneurship support organization

- Official logo of SME100 Africa
- Trade name: SME100 Africa
- Company type: Private
- Industry: Enterprise Development
- Founded: May 2015; 11 years ago in Lagos State, Nigeria
- Headquarters: Ikoyi, Lagos State, Nigeria
- Key people: Charles Odii (Executive Director)
- Website: sme100africa.org

SME100 Africa is a Social Enterprise company located in Ikoyi, a district of Lagos. Founded in 2015 by Charles Odii, it provides a platform empowering young entrepreneurs and small and medium scale enterprise to successfully scale and thrive in Africa.

SME 100 Africa hosts the annual 25Under25 Awards and Lagos Small Business Summit.

== Overview ==
At SME100 Africa, innovations by young entrepreneurs are supported through advice, mentorship and funding through series of workshops, events and skill development programs. The SME100 Africa happens to be one of the few enterprise development hubs in Africa partnering with other organisations to provide early stage business support programs and initiatives to thousands of Nigerian startups.

== 25Under25 Awards ==
The 25Under25 Awards by SME100 Africa is designed to recognize and celebrate young entrepreneurs for scaling their innovations and achieving growth, cooperation and investment readiness. The programme is being implemented in Nigeria annually for individuals under the age of 25. Notable Honorees of the award include DJ Cuppy, Tobi Bakre, Gloria Oloruntobi, Joeboy, Rema (musician), Young John, Yasmin Belo-Osagie amongst others. In 2019, Airtel Nigeria partnered with SME100 Nigeria to celebrate the 25 Nominated entrepreneurs and businesses for the fourth edition.

== Lagos Small Business Summit ==
The Lagos Small Business Summit launched by SME100 Africa is an annual 2days event to commemorate the Global Entrepreneurship Week in Nigeria with masterclasses, seminars, business advisory, pitch competition and exhibitions. The winner of the pitch competition receives a combined funding of up to one million naira, and will be supported by SME100 Africa.
