= Korty EO =

Nigerian filmmaker

- Eniola Olanrewaju
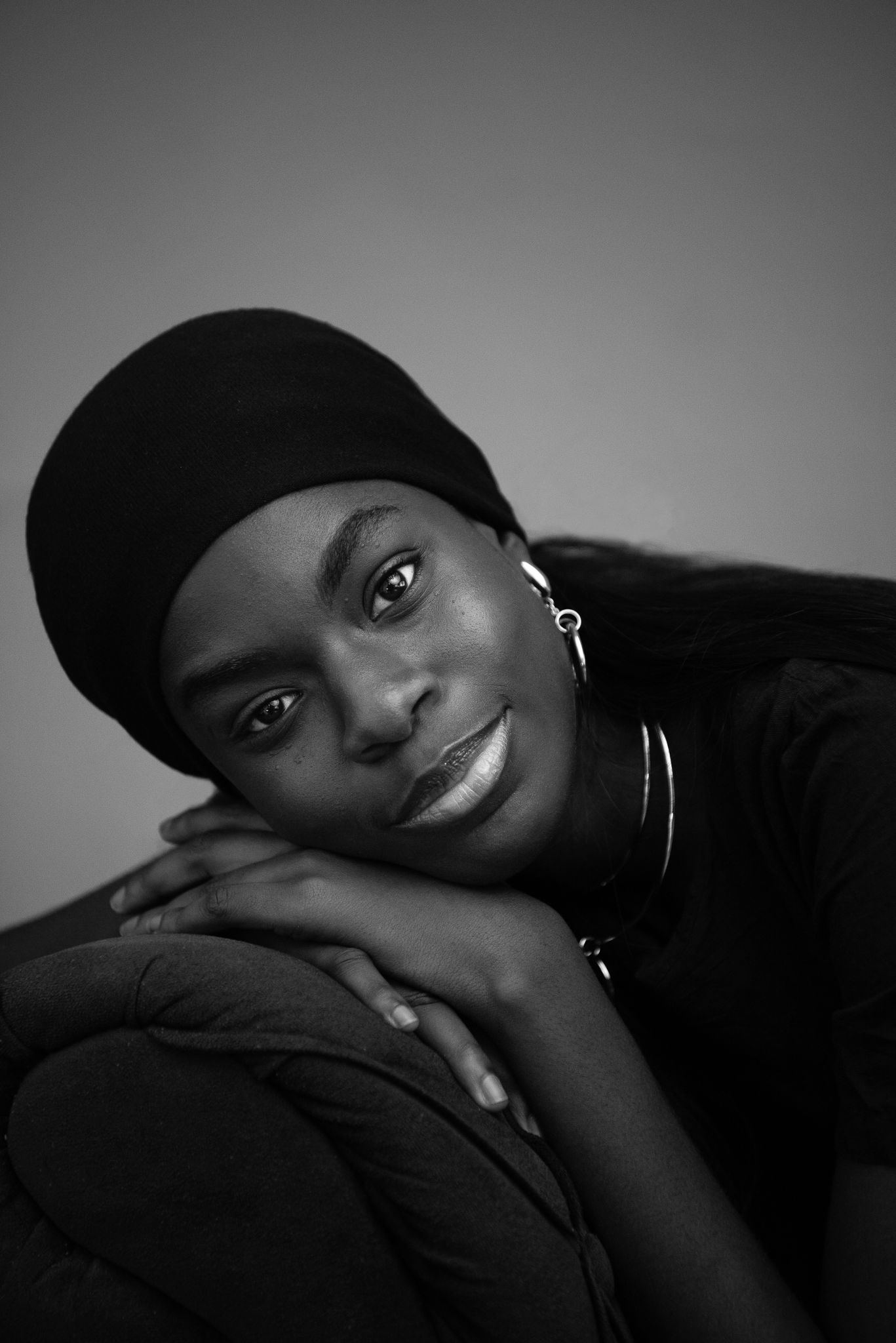
- Citizenship: Nigerian
- Education: University of Ibadan

Eniola Olanrewaju, known professionally as Korty EO or simply Korty, is a Nigerian filmmaker and YouTuber.

== Early life and education ==
Korty grew up in Bodija, Ibadan, Oyo State. She began her tertiary education at Bowen University before transferring to the University of Ibadan, where she graduated in 2018 with a degree in Computer Science.

== Career ==
In March 2018, she joined the youth media company Zikoko as a video producer, where she later helmed a show titled HER by Zikoko, focused on the experiences of women in Nigeria. In December 2020, she left to join Mr Eazi's music accelerator emPawa Africa as head of content.

Korty EO started uploading content to YouTube in 2021. Her channel has since grown to over 400,000 subscribers.

Her main interview series, Flow With Korty, features long-form, documentary-style conversations with musicians and public figures. Guests have included Don Jazzy, Olamide, Tems, Rema, Ayra Starr, Asa, Asake, and footballer Victor Osimhen.

In 2023, Korty made her directorial debut with a documentary film for Victoria's Secret: The Tour '23, as part of the brand's "VS20 House of Lagos".

== Recognition ==
In 2022, she was nominated in the Content Creator Category for The Future Awards Africa. She was also named to YouTube Black Voices Class of 2023. In 2024, Korty was profiled in Rolling Stone's "Creators Special" alongside Layi Wasabi and Taaooma.
