= Baddest Boy (Skiibii song) =

2021 single by Skiibii

Single by Skiibii

from the EP God is Bigger Than Man and the album God is Bigger Than Human
- Language: Nigerian English; Nigerian Pidgin
- Released: 4 November 2021
- Genre: Afrobeats
- Length: 2:21
- Label: More Grace Music
- Songwriter: Abbey Toyyib Elias
- Producer: Runcheck

Skiibii singles chronology
"Bygone" (2021)	"Baddest Boy" (2021)	"Bygone (Remix)" (2021)

Music video
- "Baddest Boy" on YouTube

Remix video
- "Baddest Boy (Remix)" on YouTube

"Baddest Boy" is a song by Nigerian singer and songwriter Skiibii, released on 4 November 2021 by More Grace Music. Produced by Runcheck, it became a commercial success in Nigeria. A remix of the song featuring Davido was released on 21 January 2022 and became a commercial success in the UK and America. "Baddest Boy" spent five consecutive weeks at number one on the TurnTable Top 50, number three on the UK Afrobeats Singles Chart, and at number eleven on Billboard U.S. Afrobeats Songs.

On 16 February 2022, "Baddest Boy" peaked at number 2 on Nigeria radio. Nigerian singer-songwriter Oxlade released a refix to "Baddest Boy" on 4 February 2022, and Young Jonn dropped his version on 14 February. A remix featuring Canadian singer and songwriter Tory Lanez was released on 4 March 2022.

== Music videos ==
On 26 November 2021, Skiibii released a visual video for "Baddest Boy" and directed by MLS. A video for the remix featuring Davido was released on 21 January 2022. It was shot in Lagos and was directed by Kemz. In December 2022, online video sharing platform YouTube revealed "Baddest Boy" (Remix) as one of its most trending music video of the year.

== Impact and dance routine ==
The remix featuring Davido was cited by P.M. News as one of the contents that gained traction on TikTok in Nigeria. On 30 April 2022, the publication reported that Skiibii shared videos of himself performing dance routines to his songs and posting live vocal clips, which had over 150,000 views and more than 385,000 likes across his videos at the time. As of 5 June 2024, the TikTok challenge had reached 21.5 million participants.

In 2022, music recognition app Shazam ranked "Baddest Boy" at number twenty-five on the list of the most Shazamed songs in Nigeria.

== Remixes ==
- 2021: "Baddest Boy" – 2:21
- 2022: "Baddest Boy" (remix) (featuring Davido) – 2:24
  - 2022: "Baddest Boy (US Remix)" (featuring Tory Lanez) – 2:23

Refixes

1. "Baddest Boy (Refix)" – More Grace Music featuring Skiibii & Oxlade – 1:14
2. "Baddest Boy (Refix)" – More Grace Music featuring Skiibii & Young Jonn – 1:27

== Critical reception ==
Oyefeso Anifowoshe, a music reporter for Naijaloaded rated the remix 7/10.

=== Rankings ===
Select rankings of "Baddest Boy (Remix)"
Publication	List	Rank	Ref.
OkayAfrica	Songs You Need to Hear This Week	4	
TheCable	TheCable Lifestyle Radio	1	

== Commercial performance ==
On 22 January 2022, "Baddest Boy (remix)" reached number one on Apple Music's Top 100 Nigeria chart. On 29 January 2024, it ranked at number one on TheCable's list of top 10 TCL radio picks of the week. On 31 January 2022, it debuted at number one on the Nigeria TurnTable Top 50 and spent five consecutive weeks at number one. On 13 February 2022, "Baddest Boy" peaked on the U.K. Official Afrobeats Chart, at number 3. As of 14 February 2022, "Baddest Boy (remix)" had reached number 1 on Soundcity TV Top 20 Nigeria airplay show. 16 February 2022, it peaked on Nigeria radio. On 3 March 2022, "Baddest Boy" peaked at number 33 on The Official South African Charts.

On 2 April 2022, "Baddest Boy (remix)" debuted at number eleven on the newly launched Billboard U.S. Afrobeats Songs chart. On 1 December 2022, Billboard published its initial year-end Afrobeats Songs chart. Led by Wizkid's "Essence", "Baddest Boy" debuted at number sixty-two on the chart. On 22 December 2022, TurnTable published its initial year-end Top 100 chart. Led by Kizz Daniel's "Buga", "Baddest Boy" debuted at number eight on the chart.

== Charts ==
=== Weekly charts ===
Chart performance for "Baddest Boy"
Chart (2022)	Peak position
South Africa (RISA)	33
UK Afrobeats (OCC)	3

Chart performance for "Baddest Boy (Remix)"
Chart (2022)	Peak position
NG Top 50 Airplay (TurnTable)	2
NG Top 50 (TurnTable)	1
NG Top 20 chart (Soundcity TV)	1
US Afrobeats Songs (Billboard)	11

=== Year-end charts ===
2022 year-end chart performance for "Baddest Boy (remix)"
Chart (2022)	Position
Nigeria End of the Year Top 100 (TurnTable)	8
America Year-End Afrobeats Songs (Billboard)	62

== Certifications ==
Certifications for "Baddest Boy" (remix)
Region	Certification	Certified units/sales
Nigeria (TCSN)	2× Platinum	200,000^{‡}
^{‡} Sales+streaming figures based on certification alone.

== Release history ==
Release history for "Baddest Boy"
Region	Date	Format(s)	Label
Nigeria	4 November 2021	Contemporary hit radio	More Grace Music; Dvpper

Release history for "Baddest Boy (remix)"
Region	Date	Format(s)	Label
Nigeria	21 January 2022	Contemporary hit radio	More Grace Music; Dvpper
