= Xtra Cool =

Single by Young Jonn

from the EP Love Is Not Enough, Vol. 2
- Released: 23 September 2022
- Genre: Afro pop
- Length: 2:30
- Label: Chocolate City
- Songwriter: John Saviours Udomboso
- Producer: Reward Beatz

Young Jonn singles chronology
"Dada (Remix)" (2022)	"Xtra Cool" (2022)	"Currency" (2023)

Music video
- "Xtra Cool" on YouTube

"Xtra Cool" is a song by Nigerian singer and record producer Young Jonn. It was released on 23 September 2022, through Chocolate City Music as the second single from his second EP Love Is Not Enough, Vol. 2 (2022). The song was produced by Reward Beatz

== Music video ==
"Xtra Cool"'s music video was released on 17 October 2022. The Bruno Marin-directed music video for "Xtra Cool" features Young Jonn and his love interest spending time together in various settings, including a beach house with views of a body of water. The pair are depicted enjoying each other's company, transitioning to scenes of them exploring the streets and sharing intimate moments throughout the day.

== Commercial performance ==
At the time of "Xtra Cool"'s release, it debuted on the TurnTable Top 100 chart, jumping from No. 25 to No. 13. It became the first song to top the radio chart, reaching No. 1 in airplay, while remaining outside the top ten on the aggregate chart. By the week of 14 October 2022, it climbed from No. 13 to No. 3, entering the top ten for the first time. It recorded a radio reach of 55.3 million, maintaining its No. 1 position on the radio chart for a second consecutive week, alongside 2.34 million streams (ranking No. 7 on streaming). This marked Young Jonn's second top ten entry and his highest-charting single at the time, surpassing the success of the remix of Young Jonn's previous hit single, "Dada." By 25 October 2022, "Xtra Cool" retained its No. 3 position on the TurnTable Top 100 for the second consecutive week. By 1 November 2022, the song peaked at No. 2, becoming the highest-charting single released under Chocolate City. It was also the most-streamed song on premium platforms during that tracking week. By 8 November 2022, "Xtra Cool" held the No. 2 position for the second consecutive week, while "Cough (Odo)" by Kizz Daniel continued to lead the chart at No. 1. By 16 November 2022, after two weeks at No. 2, "Xtra Cool" ascended to No. 1 on the TurnTable Top 100 chart, marking Young Jonn's first No. 1 single as a lead artist.

== Charts ==
=== Weekly charts ===
Chart performance for "Xtra Cool"
Chart (2022)	Peak position
Nigeria (TurnTable Top 100)	1

=== Year-end charts ===
2022 year-end chart performance for "Xtra Cool"
Chart (2022)	Position
Nigeria (TurnTable)	38
US Afrobeats Songs (Billboard)	76

== Certifications ==
Certifications for "Xtra Cool"
Region	Certification	Certified units/sales
Nigeria (TCSN)	2× Platinum	200,000^{‡}
^{‡} Sales+streaming figures based on certification alone.
