= Obara'M =

Nigerian film

- Directed by: Kayode Kasum
- Written by: Stephen Okonkwo
- Produced by: Kayode Kasum, Dare Olaitan
- Starring: Nancy Isime, Nkem Owoh, Deyemi Okanlawo, Bolanle Ninalowo, Darasimi Nadi,
- Production companies: Film Trybe, Singularity Media
- Distributed by: FilmOne Entertainment
- Release date: 26 August 2022
- Running time: 100 minutes
- Country: Nigeria

Obara'M is a 2022 Nigerian musical film directed by Kayode Kasum and produced by Dare Olaitan. The film stars Nancy Isime, Nkem Owoh, Onyeka Onwenu, Bolanle Ninalowo, and Deyemi Okanlawon.

== Plot ==
Obara'M tells the story of a struggling musician, Oluchi, who abandons her daughter with her father in the village to pursue a better life in Lagos. However, when her father dies, Oluchi is forced to return to the village and bear the responsibility of her daughter, Ihunnaya.

As she returns to Lagos with her daughter, Oluchi tries to balance her newfound role as a mother with her music career. While caring for her daughter, she discovers Ihunnaya's musical talent, and their shared love for music brings them closer.

As their bond strengthens, Oluchi hides the fact that she is Ihunnaya's mother. Eventually Ihunnaya discovers the truth which lead to a web of lies that threaten to tear the mother and daughter apart. Despite these lies, both the mother and daughter eventually reconcile.

== Cast ==
- Nancy Isime as Oluchi
- Nkem Owoh as Humphery
- Darasimi Nadi as Ihunnaya
- Deyemi Okanlanwo as Fidelis
- Bolanle Ninalowo as Emeka
- Sydney Talker as T-clef
- Onyeka Onwenu as Nwakego

== Reception ==
Obara'M received positive feedback from film critics for its vivid and colorful cinematography. The actors were also commended for doing a good job of bringing the characters to life.

== Awards and nominations ==
Year	Award	Category	Result
2023	Africa Magic Viewers Choice Awards	Best Sound Editor	Nominated
2023	Africa Magic Viewers Choice Awards	Best Movie West Africa	Nominated
2023	Africa Magic Viewers Choice Awards	Best Soundtrack	Nominated
2023	Best of Nollywood Awards	Best Soundtrack	Won
2023	Africa Movie Academy Awards	Best Young Actor	Nominated
