= Love & Light (EP) =

EP by Joeboy
- Released: 8 November 2019
- Genres: Afro-fusion; Afro pop
- Length: 13:04
- Labels: Banku Music; emPawa Africa
- Producers: Dëra; Killertunes; BeatsbyKO

Joeboy chronology
Love & Light (2019)	Somewhere Between Beauty & Magic (2021)

Singles from Love & Light
- 1. "Baby" Released: 1 March 2019; 2. "Beginning" Released: 15 August 2019; 3. "Don't Call Me Back" Released: 25 October 2019

Love & Light is the debut EP by Nigerian singer Joeboy. It was released on 8 November 2019 through emPawa Africa, and features a guest appearance from Mayorkun. Production was handled by Dëra, Killertunes, and BeatsbyKO. Love & Light was preceded by three singles: "Baby", "Beginning", and "Don't Call Me Back".

== Background ==
Joeboy, born Joseph Akinfenwa, rose to prominence with his Afro-fusion love songs. Before his breakout, Joeboy was a student at the University of Lagos and casually made music until a viral cover of Ed Sheeran's "Shape of You" in 2017 caught the attention of fellow Nigerian singer Mr Eazi. Reflecting on the moment, Joeboy recalled, "I didn't even know [Shape of You] until a day before I recorded the cover. My friend suggested it, and when it went viral, it started everything for me." This unexpected success led him to a mentorship under Mr Eazi's emPawa Africa initiative, which helped shape his career. Joeboy credited emPawa Africa for shaping his understanding of the music business. He noted, "They helped with knowledge, platform, and how we can promote our music through social media. Before emPawa, omo, I would jump on any deal, but now I know better." This understanding enabled him to navigate the industry while focusing on his craft.

As a member of emPawa's inaugural class, he received funding that he used to produce the music video for his hit single "Baby". Reflecting on emPawa's impact, Joeboy noted, "They really helped with the distribution aspect and putting my songs on playlists... emPawa plays a very important role in my music career. They help with promotion, too, management, shooting all the videos."

== Singles ==
The lead single "Baby" was released on 1 March 2019. Recorded in just 45 minutes, "Baby" emerged from a beat produced by Dëra and quickly gained traction. He stated, "The song grew like a virus; people just kept sharing it." Joeboy shared that the song originated from his usual process of starting with choruses, finding the perfect hook for the beat sent by Dëra. Mr Eazi helped promote the track by previewing it on social media. Accompanied by an animated visualizer, the song became a breakout hit, paving the way for his debut EP. The second single off the EP, "Beginning", was released on 16 August 2019 and was produced by Killertunes. The EP's announcement coincided with the release of the EP's third single "Don't Call Me Back", which features Mayorkun and was released on 25 October 2019. Produced by BeatsbyKO, Joeboy revealed that the song was inspired by a past experience with unrequited love. He stated, "This girl I really liked, but she wasn't interested anymore, so I wrote that song for my mind." Joeboy described the beat as simple yet compelling. After Joeboy sent the song to Mr Eazi, it was forwarded to Mayorkun.

== Critical reception ==
Motolani Alake of Pulse Nigeria praised Love & Light, highlighting two standout tracks, "Blessings" and "All for You". He acknowledged the EP's brevity, noting that it effectively showcases Joeboy's talent but could have included more songs. Alake wrote, "Joeboy still wins", despite the EP's short length, as it builds anticipation for his debut album.

Emmanuel Esomnofu of NotJustOk discussed Joeboy's rise in the music scene and the release of Love & Light. While he praised the quality of the two new songs, "All for You" and "Blessings", Esomnofu noted that fans were disappointed by the short length of the EP, with three tracks being previously released. He mentioned that "Joeboy played it safe" by limiting the number of songs, which sparked a debate on whether artists should cater to fans or focus on more polished releases.

== Track listing ==
Love & Light track listing
No.	Title	Writer(s)	Producer(s)	Length
1.	"Baby"	Joseph Akinfenwa-Donus; Chidera Ezeani	Dëra	2:45
2.	"Beginning"	Akinfenwa-Donus; Otaniyen-Uwa Daniel	Killertunes	2:38
3.	"Don't Call Me Back"	Akinfenwa-Donus; Adewale Emmanuel; Kevin Akpewe	BeatsbyKO	2:32
4.	"All for You"	Akinfenwa-Donus; Akpewe	BeatsbyKO	2:38
5.	"Blessings"	Akinfenwa-Donus; Akpewe; Godfrey	BeatsbyKO; Dëra	2:38
Total length:				13:04

== Personnel ==
- Joseph "Joeboy" Akinfenwa-Donus – vocals, writer
- Adewale "Mayorkun" Emmanuel – vocals, writer
- Chidera "Dëra" Ezeani – producer, writer (track 1, 5)
- Otaniyen-Uwa "Killertunes" Daniel – producer, writer (track 2)
- Kevin "BeatsbyKO" Akpewe – producer, writer (track 3, 4, 5)

== Release history ==
Release history and formats for Love & Light
Region	Date	Format	Label
Various	8 November 2019	Streaming; digital download	Banku Music; emPawa Africa
