= Stubborn (album) =

Studio album by Victony
- Released: 21 June 2024
- Genre: Afropop; R&B; soul; Afrobeats; hip-hop
- Length: 42:30
- Language: English; Nigerian Pidgin; Yoruba
- Label: Encore Recordings
- Producer: Louis Bell; Blaisebeatz; Harrison Song; Westen Weiss; P.Priime; 255; 1Mind; Tommy Parker; Cole Misola; Ktizo; Brendan Grieve; Nineteen85; P2J; FritzThaProducer

Victony chronology
Outlaw (2022)	Stubborn (2024)

Singles from Stubborn
- 1. "Everything" Released: 9 February 2024; 2. "Stubborn" Released: 10 May 2024

Stubborn is the debut studio album by Nigerian singer Victony. It was released on 21 June 2024 through Encore Recordings, and features guest appearances from artists Asake, Saint Jhn, Teezo Touchdown, Shallipopi, Ktizo and Shorae Moore. Production was handled by Louis Bell, Blaisebeatz, Harrison Song, Westen Weiss, P.Priime, 255, 1Mind, Tommy Parker, Cole Misola, Ktizo, Sarz, Brendan Grieve, Nineteen85, P2J and Fritz. The album serves as a follow-up to Outlaw (2022).

== Background ==
Stubborn emerged from a collection of songs recorded across different locations, including Los Angeles, reflecting the artist's varied experiences and influences. In an interview with OkayAfrica, Victony described his focus on melody, stating, “Melody is a global language,” emphasizing its power to connect listeners beyond language barriers. Originally intended as an EP, the project grew into a full album due to the volume of material he had produced. Victony noted that Stubborn serves as a way to properly introduce himself to his audience, showcasing his range and personal stories.

== Singles ==
The album's lead single "Everything" was released on 9 February 2024. The song featured production from Ktizo and Blaisebeatz, and samples Post Malone and Swae Lee's 2018 single "Sunflower". The second single and title track "Stubborn" features Asake and was produced by Westen Weiss, 1Mind, and KTIZO. The song was released on 10 May 2024.

== Composition and lyrics ==
Stubborn blends personal themes with a variety of musical influences, reflecting his experiences growing up in Lagos. The album opens with "Oshaprapra," where Victony narrates his path to success, navigating societal pressures. "Tiny Apartment," featuring Saint Jhn, depicts the loneliness of heartbreak, set against the backdrop of Lagos' face-me-I-face-you apartments. Love is a recurring theme throughout the album, with songs like "History" and "Anita" exploring relationships from different angles. In "Risk," Victony experiments with blending Fuji and Blues, while "Kolo (Kolomental II)" revisits a previous release with a swaggering update. The album closes with "Street Affair," a reflective track about betrayal and resilience, underscored by somber guitar and piano.

== Critical reception ==
Professional ratings
Review scores
Source	Rating
Afrocritik	7.6/10
Pulse Nigeria	8.1/10
The Native	8.5/10
Premium Times	7/10

Wale Oloworekende of The Native praised Stubborn as Victony's bold and reflective debut album, blending personal stories with diverse sounds and themes of love, ambition, and resilience. He highlighted how Victony's journey from his Lagos roots informs the music, describing tracks like “Tiny Apartment” as elevating Lagos-specific narratives to a global scale. Oloworekende rated the album 8.5/10, noting that it showcases Victony's "sonic malleability, imagery, and creative vision."

Nosakhale Akhimien of Premium Times described Victony's Stubborn as a solid debut album that reflects resilience and overcoming adversity, rooted in personal experiences like his near-fatal accident. The album blends Afropop, Amapiano, and disco-influenced sounds, with standout collaborations like “Tiny Apartment” featuring SAINt JHN and “Stubborn” with Asake. Akhimien rated the album 7/10, praising its emotional depth while noting some pacing inconsistencies.

Emmanuel Okoro of Afrocritik described Stubborn as a "breath of fresh air" in a year filled with subpar releases, highlighting its thematic exploration of life's highs and lows. Okoro commended the album's production and featured artists, noting it showcased Victony's journey to stardom and his resilience. The review rated the album 7.6/10.

Adeayo Adebiyi of Pulse Nigeria praised Victony's Stubborn for its daring creativity and bold fusion of genres, reflecting his resilience and defiance in both life and music. The album showcases his artistic range, from party hits like "Stubborn" to emotionally deep tracks like "Street Affair." Adebiyi noted Victony's success in blending Afrobeats with international sounds, calling the album a "bold and creative interpretation of Afrobeats" and rating it 8.1/10.

=== Accolades ===
The album was nominated for Album of the Year at the 2024 edition of the African Entertainment Awards USA.

== Track listing ==
Stubborn track listing
No.	Title	Writer(s)	Producer(s)	Length
1.	"Oshaprapra" (with Shorae Moore)	Anthony Victor; Adekunle Seyi; Chuma Nwokeke; Oluseni Oyinlola	Ktizo	3:09
2.	"History"	Victor; Nwokeke; Oyinlola	Ktizo	2:54
3.	"Ludo" (with Shallipopi)	Victor; Crown Uzama	P2J	3:32
4.	"Anita"	Victor; Richard Isong; Gaetan Judd	Gaetan Judd	3:03
5.	"Everything"	Victor; Carter Lang; Louis Bell; William Walsh; Austin Post; Carl Rosen; Khalif Brown; Marcel Akunwata; Temitope Salami; Nwokeke; Oyinlola	Ktizo	2:46
6.	"Risk"	Victor; Peace Oredope	P.Priime	3:22
7.	"Tiny Apartment" (with Saint Jhn)	Victor; Carlos Phillips; Thomas Lumpkins; Muhammad Henan Sahin	Tommy Parker; Tommy Brown; Mob Beatz	3:40
8.	"Slow Down" (with Teezo Touchdown)	Victor; Aaron Thomas; Paul Jefferies	Paul Jefferies	2:50
9.	"Stubborn" (with Asake)	Victor; Ahmed Ololade; Nwokeke; Oyinlola; Westen Weiss; McCulloch Sutphin; Sebastián López	Westen Weiss; 1Mind; Ktizo	2:56
10.	"Kolo (Kolomental II)"	Victor; Weiss; Sutphin	Westen Weiss; Louis Bell; Brendan Grieve; 1Mind	2:46
11.	"Bastard, Don't Be Silly"	Victor; Nwokeke; Oyinlola; Louis Josek; Charles Josek; Guy Solomon Josek	255	2:51
12.	"Pier 46" (with Ktizo)	Victor; Brandon Sully; Harrison Song; Nwokeke; Oyinlola	FritzThaProducer; Harry	2:38
13.	"Sunday School"	Victor; Isong; Gaetan Judd	P2J; Gaetan Judd	3:03
14.	"Street Affair"	Victor; Cole Misola; Song; Nwokeke; Oyinlola	Cole Misola; Harrison Song; Ktizo	2:52
Total length:				42:30

=== Notes ===
- "Everything" samples Post Malone and Swae Lee's song "Sunflower."

== Personnel ==
- Anthony "Victony" Victor – vocals, writer (all tracks)
- Adekunle "Shorae Moore" Seyi – vocals, writer (track 1)
- Crown "Shallipopi" Uzama – vocals, writer (track 3)
- DeepXpressions Choir – background vocals (tracks 4, 14)
- Melissa Montgomery – background vocals (track 6)
- Aaron "Teezo Touchdown" Thomas – vocals, writer (track 8)
- Ahmed "Asake" Ololade – vocals, writer (track 9)
- Carlos "Saint Jhn" Phillips – vocals, writer (track 7)
- Leandro "Dro" Hidalgo – mixing engineer (track 4)
- Tyler Chase – mixing engineer (tracks 6, 7, 8, 10)
- Peter A. Barker – spatial mixing engineer (track 5)
- Sam Harper – mixing engineer (track 13)
- Liz Robson – recording engineer (track 9)
- Chuma "Hoodini" Nwokeke (of Ktizo) – writer, mixing engineer, mastering engineer (tracks 1, 2, 3, 4, 5, 6, 7, 8, 9, 10, 11, 12, 13, 14)
- Oluseni "IamDJNotorious" Oyinlola (of Ktizo) – writer (tracks 1, 2, 5, 9, 11, 12, 14)
- Ktizo – producer (tracks 1, 2, 9, 12, 14)
- Richard "P2J" Isong – producer, writer (tracks 3, 4, 13)
- Gaetan Judd – producer, writer (tracks 4, 13)
- Westen Weiss – producer, writer (tracks 9, 10)
- 1Mind – producer (tracks 9, 10)
- Mac Sutphin (of 1Mind) – writer (tracks 9, 10)
- Sebastián López (of 1Mind) – writer (track 9)
- Louis Bell – writer, producer (tracks 5, 10)
- Brendan Grieve – producer (track 10)
- Carter Lang – writer (track 5)
- William Walsh – writer (track 5)
- Austin "Post Malone" Post – writer (track 5)
- Carl Rosen – writer (track 5)
- Khalif "Swae Lee" Brown – writer (track 5)
- Marcel "Blaisebeatz" Akunwata – producer, writer (track 5)
- Temitope Salami – writer (track 5)
- Paul Jefferies – producer, writer (track 8)
- Tommy Parker – producer (track 7)
- Tommy Brown – producer (track 7)
- Mob Beatz – producer (track 7)
- Cole Misola – producer, writer (track 14)
- Harrison "Harry" Song – producer, writer (tracks 12, 14)
- Brandon "Fritz" Sully – producer, writer (track 12)
- Louis Amon Josek (of 255) – writer (track 11)
- Charles Malo Josek (of 255) – writer (track 11)
- Guy Solomon Josek (of 255) – writer (track 11)
- 255 – producer (track 11)

== Release history ==
Release history and formats for Stubborn
Region	Date	Format	Label
Various	21 June 2024	Streaming; digital download	Encore Recordings
