= With You (Khaid song) =

2022 single by Khaid

Single by Khaid

from the EP DIVERSITY
- Released: 28 January 2022
- Recorded: 2021–2022
- Genre: Afropop; R&B
- Length: 3:13
- Label: Neville Records
- Songwriter: Khaid
- Producers: Prodby106; Ozekidus; Z3na

Khaid singles chronology
"With You" (2022)	"Ski" (2022)

Music video
- "With You" on YouTube

"With You" is a song by Nigerian Afropop singer Khaid, released on 28 January 2022. The song was produced by Nigerian record producer Prodby106, Ozekidus, and Z3na. It was ranked at number 8 on TheCable's list of 10 TCL radio pick of the week, and debuted on number 48 on TurnTable Top 50 chart. As of April 2022, "With You" has received 10.5 million streams on Boomplay.

== Background ==
After signing a record deal with Sydney Talker newly launched label, Neville Records in 2022. Khaid "With You" was released on 28 January 2022, 8 days after he was introduced to the public by various Instagram Comedians, including Sydney Talker, who serves as the label founder. The production was handled by Prodby106, Ozekidus and Z3na. Then mixing and mastering were handled by Swaz and STG.

== Music video ==
On 28 January 2022, Khaid released the music video for "With You", under Neville Records. The visual sees Khaid lounging around his apartment as a ghost and in the street of Lagos in a Danfo. The visual was directed by Olu The Wave, for A Strange Picture. The music video reached 1.1 million views on YouTube, as of April 2022.

== Commercial performance ==
During its debut week, "With You" peaked at ninety-four, on Apple Music Top 100 Nigeria Songs and reached number three on 20 February. It debuted on number forty-eight on the TurnTable Top 50 chart, on 14 February and eventually reached number ten on 15 March. "With You" debuted at number twenty on Top Triller Global, on 26 February and reached number two, on 5 March. On 16 February, "With You" debuted on TurnTable Top 50 Streaming Songs on twenty-five and reached number seven, on 9 March. "With You", debuted on Top Triller chart Nigeria, on number eight, and reached number two on 16 February. "With You" debuted at number forty-two on TurnTable Top 50 Airplay, on 22 February and reached number seventeen on 15 March. "With You" has received 10.5 million Boomplay streams, and 1.9 million Spotify streams as of April 2022.

== Charts ==
Chart (2022)	Peak position
Nigeria (TurnTable Top 50)	48
Top Triller Global (Billboard)	20
Top 50 Streaming Songs (TurnTable)	25
Top Triller chart Nigeria (TurnTable)	8
TurnTable Top 50 Airplay (TurnTable)	42
TCL Radio (TheCable)	8

== Release history ==
Region	Date	Format	Label	Ref.
Various	28 January 2022	Digital download; streaming	Neville Records	
