= Love and Light (Balmages) =

21st-century composition by Brian Balmages

Love and Light is a grade V musical work by American composer Brian Balmages. The work was commissioned in January, 2019 by the grieving 1st Lt. Elizabeth Elliott, in memory of her stillborn child, Madison Hope Elliott. The work is one movement long with an introduction and 3 sections. For the piece, Balmages was inspired by his father's death and his son's medical issues.

The piece was premiered by the U.S. Army Band at the Rachel M. Schlesinger Concert Hall and Arts Center in Alexandria, Virginia on February 22, 2020, and was conducted by Elizabeth Elliot herself.

== Reception and Awards ==
The composition won Balmages won the 2020 William D. Revelli Composition Contest.
