= Brian Balmages =

American composer (born 1975)

- Born: January 24, 1975 (age 51)
- Occupations: composer, conductor, musician
- Awards: NBA/William D. Revelli Memorial Composition Contest
- Brian Balmages's voice Balmages giving an introduction to his piece Farefare & Fireworks in 2012; Recorded March 2012
- Website: brianbalmages.com

Brian Philip Balmages (born January 24, 1975) is an American composer, conductor, and music educator. He is best known for composing educational music for wind instruments.

== Early life and education ==
Brian Balmages obtained a Bachelor's of Music degree in music industry from James Madison University, with a focus on trumpet performance, and a Master's of Music in media scoring and production from the Frost School of Music at the University of Miami.

== Career ==
Brian Balmages was the director of bands and orchestras at Towson University. He has been the guest conductor of orchestras around the US, in Canada, Italy, and Australia.

Balmages was the Director of Instrumental Publications for the FJH Music Company for over 20 years. Currently, he is the Director of MakeMusic Publications and since 2022 the Director of Digital Education for Alfred and MakeMusic.

== Works ==
=== For wind instruments ===
- Pele for Solo horn and Wind Ensemble (2004)
- Moscow 1941 for Concert Band (2006)
- Apollo for Soprano Saxophone and Wind Ensemble (2008)
- Summer Resounding! for Concert Band (2008)
- Three Celtic Dances for Concert Band (2008)
- Arabian Dances for Symphonic Band (2009)
- Elements for Concert Band (2010)
- Escape from the Deep (2010)
- Incantation and Ritual for Wind Orchestra (2015)
- Rippling Watercolors for Concert Band (2015)
- Kyiv 2022 (a Sequel to Moscow, 1941), (2022)
- Into the Arctic
- Sapier's Story
- Midnight Mission
- Endless Rainbows
- Fanfare Canzonique
- Groove Music
- Love and Light

=== For string instruments ===
- Backstage Pass for Symphony Orchestra, Concert band, or Jazz band (2015)
- It Takes One to Tango for Cello and Orchestra

== Personal life ==
Balmages resides in Lutherville, Maryland. He is married and has two children.

== Recognition ==
- A. Austin Harding Award from the American School Band Directors Association
- 2020 NBA William D. Revelli Composition Contest for Love and Light
- James Madison University Distinguished Alumni Award from the School of Visual and Performing Art
