= Shibiri =

Shibiri is a town located in Ojo local government area of Lagos State, Nigeria. Ruled by a traditional ruler, its ZIP code is 102111.
