= Carter Efe =

Nigerian comedian and online streamer

- Also known as: Machala
- Born: Oderhowho Joseph Efe; September 29, 2001 (age 25); Ughelli, Delta state, Nigeria
- Genres: Afropop; Afro beat; Afro trap; R&B
- Occupations: Comedian; online streamer; singer; songwriter
- Years active: 2019–present

Oderhohwo Joseph Efe (born 29 September 2001) better known as Carter Efe, is a Nigerian comedian, online streamer, singer and songwriter.

== Early life and education ==
Oderhowho Joseph Efe was born in Ogun State, Nigeria, into a family originally from Ughelli North in Delta State. He is the sixth of seven children. Efe attended Grace Group of Schools in Ogun State for his primary education before moving on to Christ Apostolic Grammar School, also in Ogun State, for his secondary education. Later, he attended Hussey College Warri in Warri, Delta State.

Growing up, Efe faced financial challenges after the death of his father, a policeman, in 2015. Despite passing the post – Unified Tertiary Matriculation Examination (post-UTME), financial difficulties made it impossible for him to attend any tertiary institution, as his mother, a businesswoman, struggled to cover the family's expenses.

After completing his secondary school education in 2019, Efe began creating content, posting humorous videos online. His inspiration came from fellow content creator Sydney Talker, whom he regards as his mentor. The success of his content led to a growing following on social media platforms, particularly Instagram, where he gained significant attention.

== Career ==
Carter Efe, in 2024, began as a comedian, making skits and posting them on social media platforms. During that period, he gained initial recognition. In 2022 he rose to stardom and mainstream after he released his hit song "Machala", which he featured Berri Tiga.

=== Online streaming ===
In December 2025, Nigerian singer Davido appeared on Efe's Twitch channel. After the livestream, Efe became the most followed Twitch streamer in Africa.

In July 2026, Carter Efe was selected for the Streamer University Class of 2026, a creator development programme founded by American streamer Kai Cenat. However, he was unable to attend as his U.S. visa application was still pending at the time the event began.

== Awards and nominations ==
Awards and nominations for Peller
| Year | Award | Category | Result | Ref. |
|---|---|---|---|---|
| 2026 | The Streamer Awards | Best International Streamer | Pending | |

== Discography ==
=== Singles ===
- Machala
- Ololade Mi Carter
