= Sip (Alcohol) =

Single by Joeboy

from the album Body & Soul
- Released: 24 September 2021
- Genre: Afro pop; afrobeats; amapiano
- Length: 2:38
- Label: emPawa Africa
- Songwriters: Joseph Akinfenwa-Donus; Michael Alagwu; Derick Obuobie Jr.
- Producer: Tempoe

Joeboy singles chronology
"Summer Bounce" (2021)	"Sip (Alcohol)" (2021)	"So Bad" (2021)

Music video
- "Sip (Alcohol)" on YouTube

"Sip (Alcohol)" is a song by Nigerian singer Joeboy. It was released on 24 September 2021 through emPawa Africa as the lead single from his second studio album Body & Soul (2023). Produced by Tempoe, the song became viral on TikTok, where it inspired a variety of social media challenges. It initially featured individuals drinking food-based or alcoholic beverages, but some participants took it further by consuming harmful substances, causing Joeboy to advise against such actions.

== Background and composition ==
In an interview with the Grammys, Joeboy said the song is about taking a short break from everyday struggles. He said the idea came to him while in Ghana and that the lyrics were inspired by a calm moment. He added that the song is meant to be a feel-good track about enjoying life even during hard time. According to Elias Leight of Rolling Stone, the track blends Nigerian afrobeats with South African amapiano, calling it a "beautiful merger" with "oomph" that lets Joeboy "maintain his anti-gravitational powers." He added that Joeboy "swoop-sings in swashbuckling arcs" and layers "sweetheart harmonies" over a beat "like a spoon knock-knocking on a tabletop."

== TikTok challenge ==
After its release, "Sip (Alcohol)" inspired a viral TikTok challenge in Nigeria. While the original challenge featured participants consuming food-based or alcoholic drinks, some used harmful substances, prompting Joeboy to warn against unsafe practices. The challenge reflects the growing trend of social media challenges boosting song visibility.

== Live performances ==
Joeboy performed an acoustic version of the song on Off-Air with Gbemi & Toolz.

== Commercial performance ==
"Sip (Alcohol)" debuted at number five on the TurnTable Top 50 chart dated 4 October 2021, becoming Joeboy's highest-charting entry and his fourth top ten single overall. The song reached number one the following week, marking Joeboy's first chart-topping single, and set a TurnTable record for the highest weekly streams with 6.07 million equivalent streams, surpassing Davido's "FEM". By late October, it had spent three consecutive weeks at number one and recorded one of the biggest chart weeks in TurnTable history at the time. The song extended its run at number one into early November, setting multiple weekly performance records across streaming, radio, and television metrics. By 13 December 2021, "Sip (Alcohol)" had spent nine weeks at number one, tying Fireboy DML's "Peru" as the second longest running chart-topper of the year, behind Kizz Daniel's "Lie".

== Accolades ==
Awards and nominations for "Sip (Alcohol)"
Organization	Year	Category	Result	Ref.
All Africa Music Awards	2022	African Fan's Favorite	Nominated	
The Headies	2022	Viewer's Choice	Nominated	
3Music Awards	2022	African Song of the Year	Nominated	

== Charts ==
=== Weekly charts ===
Chart performance for "Sip (Alcohol)"
Chart (2021–22)	Peak position
Nigeria (TurnTable Top 100)	1
US Afrobeats Songs (Billboard)	14
UK Afrobeats (Official Charts)	2

=== Year-end charts ===
2021 year-end chart performance for "Sip (Alcohol)"
Chart (2021)	Position
Nigeria (TurnTable Top 50)	9

2022 year-end chart performance for "Sip (Alcohol)"
Chart (2022)	Position
Nigeria (TurnTable Top 100)	51
US Afrobeats Songs (Billboard)	49

== Certifications ==
Certifications for "Sip (Alcohol)"
Region	Certification	Certified units/sales
Nigeria (TCSN)	4× Platinum	400,000^{‡}
United Kingdom (BPI)	Silver	200,000^{‡}
^{‡} Sales+streaming figures based on certification alone.

== See also ==
- List of best-selling singles by country
