= Victony =

Nigerian singer and rapper

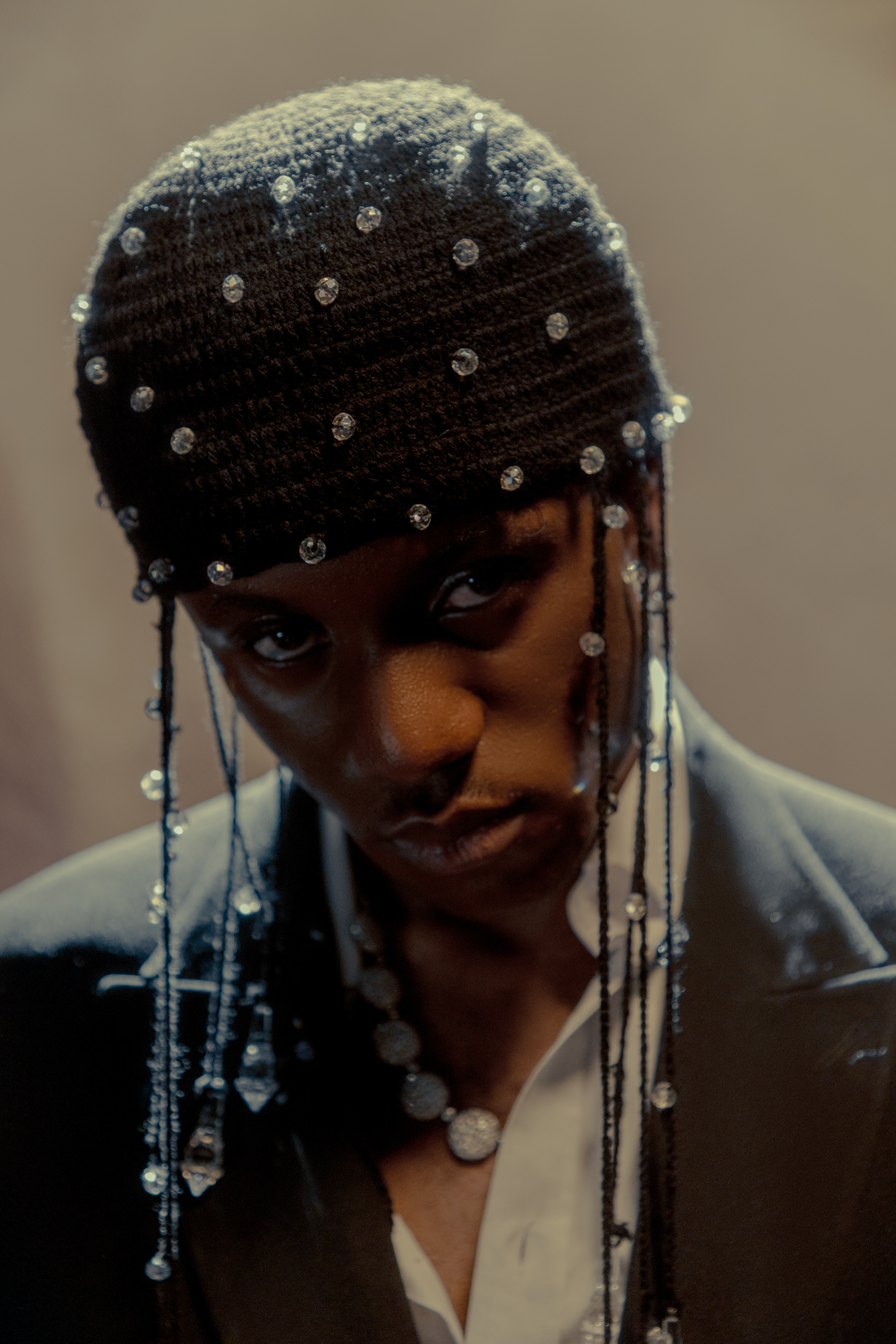
- Victony in 2024
- Born: Anthony Ebuka Victor; 5 January 2001 (age 25); Ojo, Lagos, Nigeria
- Occupations: Singer; songwriter; rapper
- Years active: 2017–present
- Notable work: Outlaw
- Musical career
- Origin: Orsu, Imo, Nigeria
- Genres: Afrobeats; hip hop; afropop; R&B
- Instruments: Vocals; keyboards
- Website: www.outlawville.world

Anthony Ebuka Victor (born 5 January 2001), known professionally as Victony, is a Nigerian singer, songwriter and rapper. Victony began his music career in 2016 as a rapper on SoundCloud, releasing freestyles and mixes. He released his debut studio album Saturn in August 2020. He released his first single titled "Ina Benz", which was his first appearance in the music industry. In 2022, Victony released "Soweto" featuring Tempoe as the debut single off his Outlaw EP. It gained traction on TikTok and a remix featuring Rema and Don Toliver charted in the United Kingdom, Netherlands, Switzerland and Canada. In June 2024, he released his second studio album Stubborn.

== Early life ==
Anthony Ebuka Victor was born in Ojo, Lagos, and hails from the Orsu local government area of Imo State. While growing up, he was influenced by artists like Davido, Wizkid, Mi, and Falz.

== Career ==
Victony first came to the scene when he traded rap verses with Ladipoe on his revival Sunday series. He made his debut with a mixtape on SoundCloud titled The Outlaw King. The mixtape was followed by covers of international hit records like "Bodak Yellow" by Cardi B, "Moonlight" by XXXTentacion, and "On the Low" by Burna Boy.

Victony started off as a rapper but later switched and started releasing R&B, trap music, and Afropop records.

2021 started with his record "Pray", a song released after he was involved in a car crash. In October 2021, he teamed up with Mayorkun on the song "Holy Father". The song debuted at number one on Apple Music Nigeria and peaked at number 3 on the Billboard Top Triller Global charts in December 2021. He later collaborated with Grammy Award-winning producer Rexxie on an EP called Nataraja.

=== Outlaw EP and Stubborn ===
On 6 May 2022, Victony released the seven-track EP Outlaw. It was mostly successful, with it comprising the hit songs "Soweto" featuring Tempoe, "All Power," and "Kolomental."

He later released a handful of songs and also appeared in features including "Babylon," "Ohema," "Hypnotize," "Different Size," "Jaga Jaga," "My Darling," and "Angelus." "Stubborn" and "Everything" were released in February and May 2024 respectively, with the latter including a sample of the song "Sunflower" by Post Malone and Swae Lee. The two songs would later be included in his forthcoming album.

He released Stubborn on 21 June 2024. It comprised 14 tracks with features from Saint Jhn, Shallipopi, Kzito, Asake, Teezo Touchdown, and Shorae Moore.

He released his second album, Starlife, on 21 August 2026.

== Personal life ==
He graduated from the Federal university of Technology Owerri (F.U.T.O), where he studied petroleum engineering. On 21 April 2021, Victony was involved in a car crash which claimed the life of one of his friends, Doyin, and Victony needed surgery.

Victony remained on a wheelchair after the surgery, but stood to perform for the first time alongside Davido and Mayorkun on 24 December 2021.

== Discography ==
=== Studio albums ===
- Stubborn (2024)
- Starlife (2026)

=== Extended plays ===
List of extended plays
Title	Year
Saturn	2020
Outlaw	2022
Very Stubborn	2025

=== Singles ===
==== As lead artist ====
List of singles as lead artist
Title	Year	Peak chart positions							Certification	Album
Title	Year	CAN	DOM Ang. Air.	NLD	SWI	UK	US	UK Afro	Certification	Album
"Ina the Benz"	2018	—	—	—	—	—	—	—		Non-album singles
"Menace"	2019	—	—	—	—	—	—	—		Non-album singles
"2 Mins in Space"	2019	—	—	—	—	—	—	—		Non-album singles
"Broken"	2020	—	—	—	—	—	—	—		Non-album singles
"S.M.S (Sing My Song)"	2020	—	—	—	—	—	—	—		Non-album singles
"Apollo"	2022	—	—	—	—	—	—	—		Non-album singles
"Kolomental"	2022	—	—	—	—	—	—	—		Outlaw
"Soweto" (with Tempoe or also Rema featuring Don Toliver or also Omah Lay)	2022	76	—	46	29	65	175	1	BPI: Gold	Outlaw
"Fre$h"	2026	—	—	—	—	—	—	—		Non-album singles
"Slick"	2026	—	12	— (Note: "Slick" did not enter the Dutch Single Top 100, but peaked at number four on the Dutch Single Tip chart.)	—	99	—	1		Non-album singles
"—" denotes a recording that did not chart or was not released in that territory.

==== As featured artist ====
List of singles as featured artist
Title	Year	Album
"Holy Father" (Mayorkun featuring Victony)	2021	Back in Office
"Euphoria" (Hoodini featuring Victony)	2021	Non-album singles
"Anointing" (Anonymous Music featuring Victony)	2022	Non-album singles
"Bad Girl" (DJ Tunez featuring Wande Coal and Victony)	2022	Non-album singles
"Notice" (Ezzymullah featuring 1da Banton, Victony and DTG Baby)	2022	Non-album singles
"Different Size" (Burna Boy featuring Victony)	2022	Love, Damini

== Awards and nominations ==
Year	Ceremony	Nominee/work	Award	Result	Ref
2023	The Headies	"Soweto"	Best Recording of the Year	Won	
2023	The Headies	"Soweto"	Headies' Viewers' Choice	Won	
2023	The Headies	"Soweto"	Producer of the Year	Nominated	
2023	Soundcity MVP Awards	"Holy Father"	Best Collaboration	Nominated	
2023	Soundcity MVP Awards	"Holy Father"	Best New MVP	Nominated	
2023	Soundcity MVP Awards	"Holy Father"	Song of the year	Nominated	
2023	Billboard Music Awards	"Soweto"	Best Recording of the Year	Nominated	
2022	Clout Africa Award	"Holy Father"	Songwriter of the year	Nominated	
2022	Clout Africa Award	"Holy Father"	Revelation of the Year	Nominated	
2022	Clout Africa Award	"Holy Father"	Collaboration of the Year	Nominated	
