= Soweto (song) =

Single by Victony

from the EP Outlaw
- Released: 6 May 2022
- Genre: Afrobeats
- Length: 2:38
- Label: Encore Recordings
- Songwriters: Anthony Victor Ebuka; Michael Chigozie Alagwu
- Producer: Tempoe

Victony singles chronology
"Holy Father" (2021)	"Soweto" (2022)	"Angelus" (2023)

Music videos
- "Soweto" on YouTube "Soweto" (Remix) on YouTube

"Soweto" is a 2022 song by Nigerian singer Victony and producer Tempoe. It was released as the first single from Victony's second extended play Outlaw. It gained popularity on Tiktok and charted across the United Kingdom, Canada, Netherlands and Switzerland. A remix featuring Omah Lay was released before a second remix with Rema and Don Toliver was released propelling the song further.

Victony and Tempoe released the video for "Soweto" in October 2022. The video was directed by Jyde Ajala and garnered over 8 million views on YouTube within four weeks. A second video was released for the remix. The song featured at number 15 on Rolling Stone magazine's "Top 40 Afropop Songs of 2022".

== Accolades ==
Year	Ceremony	Nominee/work	Award	Result	Ref
2023	African Entertainment Awards USA	"Soweto"	Song of the Year	Nominated	
2023	African Entertainment Awards USA	"Soweto"	Best Collaboration	Nominated	
2023	The Headies	"Soweto"	Best Recording of the Year	Won	
2023	The Headies	"Soweto"	Headies' Viewers' Choice	Won	
2023	The Headies	"Soweto"	Producer of the Year	Nominated	

== Track listings ==
Digital download, streaming
No.	Title	Length
1.	"Soweto" (with Tempoe)	2:38

Digital download, streaming
No.	Title	Length
1.	"Soweto" (with Omah Lay and Tempoe)	3:04

Digital download, streaming
No.	Title	Length
1.	"Soweto" (with Don Toliver, Rema and Tempoe)	3:40

== Charts ==
=== Weekly charts ===
Weekly chart performance for "Soweto"
Chart (2023)	Peak position
Canada (Canadian Hot 100)	76
Global Excl. US (Billboard)	175
Luxembourg (Billboard)	17
Netherlands (Single Top 100)	46
Nigeria (TurnTable Top 50)	4
Switzerland (Schweizer Hitparade)	29
UK Singles (Official Charts)	65
UK Hip Hop/R&B (Official Charts)	31
UK Indie (Official Charts)	3
UK Afrobeats (Official Charts)	1
US Afrobeats Songs (Billboard)	5
US Mainstream R&B/Hip-Hop Airplay (Billboard)	34

=== Year-end charts ===
Year-end chart performance for "Soweto"
Chart (2023)	Position
Netherlands (Single Top 100)	79

== Certifications ==
Certifications for "Soweto"
Region	Certification	Certified units/sales
France (SNEP)	Gold	100,000^{‡}
Nigeria (TCSN)	3× Platinum	300,000^{‡}
Spain (Promusicae)	Gold	30,000^{‡}
United Kingdom (BPI)	Gold	400,000^{‡}
^{‡} Sales+streaming figures based on certification alone.
