= Machala (song) =

2022 single by Carter Efe and Berri Tiga

"Machala" is a 2022 song by Carter Efe and Berri Tiga. It was released on 29 July 2022 as a homage to Wizkid. The song gained widespread support from Wizkid fanbase and it reached significant positions on international streaming platforms. It peaked at number 14 on the US Billboard Afrobeats chart and debuted at number one on the Apple Music Nigeria Top 100 and number two on the TurnTable Nigeria Top 100.

== Controversy ==
Following the success of the song, Carter Efe and Beri Tiga engaged in a verbal feud over its ownership. In August 2022, the song was removed from Apple and Spotify streaming apps.
