= Joeboy =

Nigerian singer-songwriter (born 1997)

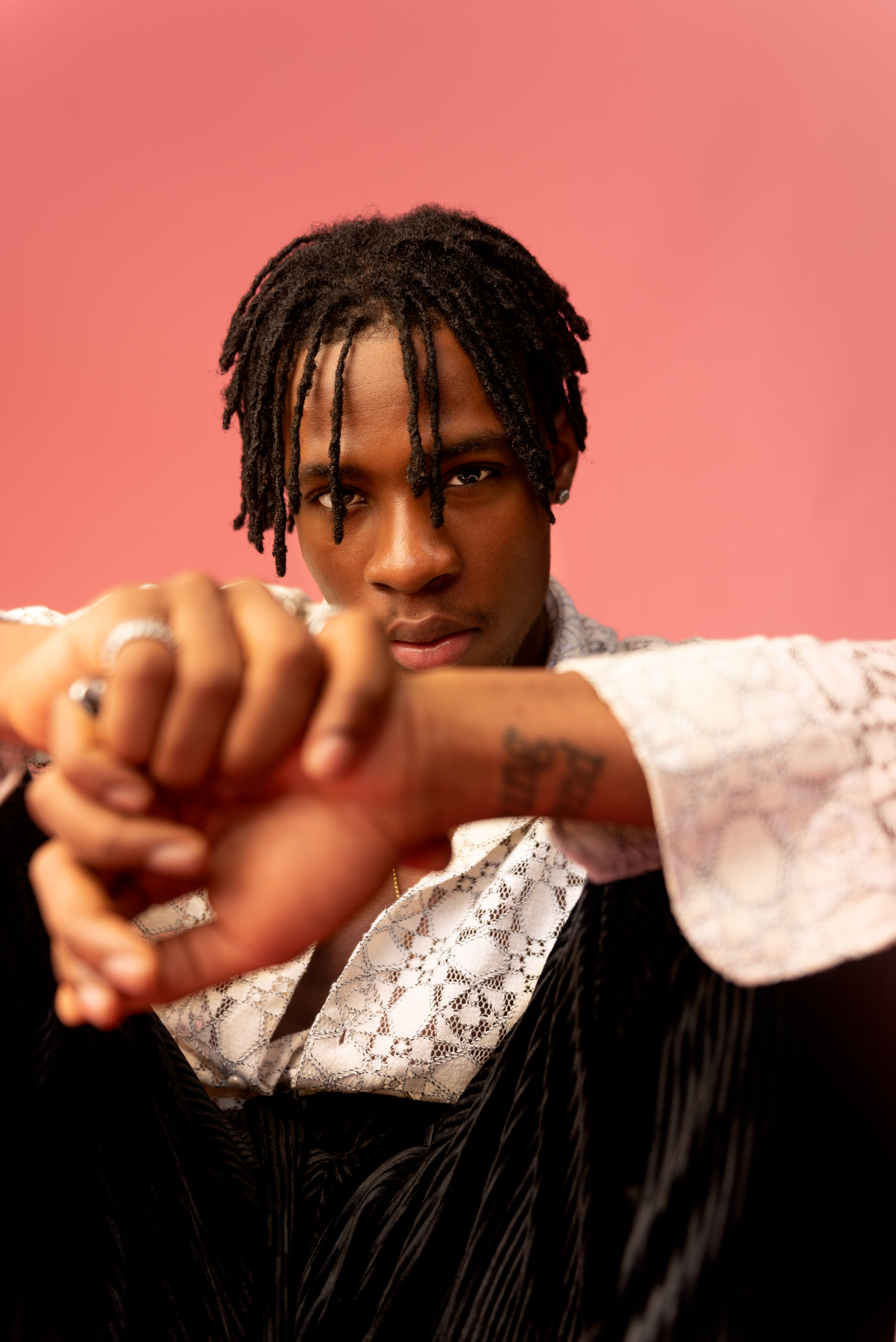
- Joeboy in 2021

Background information
- Born: Joseph Akinwale Akinfenwa-Donus; 21 May 1997 (age 29); Edo State, Nigeria
- Genres: Afrobeats; contemporary R&B
- Occupations: Singer; songwriter
- Years active: 2017–present
- Labels: Young Legend; WMA
- Website: joeboyofficial.com

Joseph Akinwale Akinfenwa-Donus (born 21 May 1997), known professionally as Joeboy, is a Nigerian singer and songwriter. He is signed to Warner Music Africa in partnership with his record label, Young Legend. He was formerly signed by Mr Eazi under emPawa Africa, where he was discovered in 2017, through the emPawa Africa talent incubation program.

== Career ==
Joeboy began his music career in 2017 with a viral cover of Ed Sheeran's "Shape of You". The cover marked his transition from rapping to singing, a decision encouraged by a friend. It caught the attention of Nigerian artist and entrepreneur Mr Eazi, who discovered Joeboy on Instagram and invited him to join the emPawa Africa initiative, a program designed to support emerging African artists by providing them with resources to grow their careers.

The Mr Eazi-assisted track "Fààjí" was released on 26 October 2018; Joeboy used his portion of the grant he received from emPawa100 to shoot a video for the song.

In early 2019, Joeboy recorded his hit single "Baby" after receiving a beat created by Dëra the Boy and sent to him by producer BeatsbyKO. He wrote and recorded the song in just 45 minutes, trying out several choruses before finalizing the hook. When Mr Eazi heard the track, he shared it on social media, building anticipation ahead of its release on 1 March 2019. With support from emPawa Africa, Joeboy utilized a cost-effective visualizer to promote "Baby", which played a crucial role in the song's viral success. He credited the initiative with equipping him to effectively market his music and maintain his independence. "Baby" garnered 20 million streams across YouTube and Spotify in 2019. The visualizer music video for "Baby" surpassed 31 million views on YouTube. Joeboy released the Killertunes-produced track "Beginning" on 15 August 2019, where its accompanying visualizer music video accumulated 23 million views on YouTube. In the video, he finds himself developing feelings for a friend whose advances he had initially dismissed. Followed by this, he released his debut extended play Love & Light in November 2019 by emPawa Africa. It was supported by the singles "Baby" and "Beginning". The EP also contains the Mayorkun-assisted track "Don't Call Me" and "All for You".

Joeboy won Best Artiste in African Pop at the 2019 All Africa Music Awards, and Best Pop at the 2020 Soundcity MVP Awards Festival. He was nominated for multiple City People Entertainment Awards and The Headies. Joeboy released the Dera-produced track "Call" on 10 April 2020. Described as a "catchy love song" by OkayAfrica , "Call" is the lead single from his upcoming debut studio album. The TG Omori-directed video for the single features dystopian sci-fi themes.

In January 2021, Joeboy announced his debut album, Somewhere Between Beauty & Magic, which was released in February 2021 to moderate commercial success.

On 19 May 2023, Joeboy released his sophomore studio album, Body & Soul, preceded by the four singles "Sip (Alcohol)", "Contour", "Body & Soul", and "Duffel Bag".

On 2 February 2024, Joeboy announced the launch of his record label "Young Legend".

=== Copyright infringement accusation ===
Singer Asa issued a copyright infringement notice to Joeboy in October 2022, over his song "Contour", over claims that the composition of the song was originally recorded by her and the producer of the song "Tempoe", earlier in September 2020 during a recording session. Asa, through her legal counsel, made a notice to Joeboy via mail, which was shared by Joeboy on his Instagram story on 3 October 2022. The notice revealed that she demanded the sum of N300 million and gave a 24-hour ultimatum for the song to be removed from all digital streaming platforms. Through her management, Asa also asked for a 60 percent publishing split on the song, and a written apology.

== Discography ==
=== Album ===
List of studio albums
Title	Album details
Somewhere Between Beauty & Magic	Released: 3 February 2022; Label: Banku Music, emPawa Africa; Formats: CD, digital download, streaming
Body & Soul	Released: 19 May 2023; Label: Banku Music, emPawa Africa; Formats: CD, digital download, streaming
Viva Lavida	Released: 28 March 2025; Label: Young Legend, Warner Music Africa; Formats: CD, digital download, streaming

=== EPs ===
List of extended plays
Title	EP details
Love & Light	Released: 8 November 2019; Label: Banku Music / emPawa Africa; Formats: CD, LP, digital download, streaming
Apple Music Home Session: Joeboy (Note: Apple Exclusive)	Released: 1 February 2023; Label: Banku Music / emPawa Africa; Formats: Digital download, streaming
Body, Soul & Spirit	Released: 17 November 2023; Label: emPawa Africa; Formats: Digital download, streaming

=== Singles ===
==== As lead artist ====
List of singles, showing title and year released with selected chart positions
Title	Year	Chart positions		Certifications	Album
Title	Year	NG	UK	Certifications	Album
"Realest" (featuring Triple N)	2017	—	—		Non-album singles
"Fire" (featuring King Promise and GuiltyBeatz)	2018	—	—		Non-album singles
"Fààjí" (featuring Mr Eazi)	2018	—	—		Non-album singles
"Gbese" (featuring Oxlade and DJ Voyst)	2019	—	—		Non-album singles
"Baby"	2019	—	—		Love & Light
"Beginning"	2019	—	—		Love & Light
"Don't Call Me Back"(featuring Mayorkun)	2019	—	—		Love & Light
"Blessings"	2019	—	—		Love & Light
"All for You"	2019	—	—		Love & Light
"Call"	2020	—	—		Non-album single
"Lonely"	2020	—	—		Somewhere Between Beauty & Magic
"Empty My Pocket" (with Lakizo Entertainment)	2021	—	—		Non-album singles
"Felicitation" (with DJ Voyst)	2021	—	—		Non-album singles
"Sip (Alcohol)"	2021	1	2	TCSN: 3× Platinum; BPI: Silver	Body & Soul
"Cubana"	2022	—	17		Non-album singles
"Spiritual Gbedu"	2022	—	—		Non-album singles
"Contour"	2022	—	17		Body & Soul
"Likkle Rikkim"	2022	—	—		Non-album single
"Body & Soul"	2023	8	9	TCSN: Platinum	Body & Soul
"Duffel Bag"	2023	—	10		Body & Soul
"Game Over" (with Michaël Brun)	2023	—	—		Non-album single

==== As featured artist ====
List of singles, showing title and year released with selected chart positions
Title	Year	Chart positions											Certifications	Album
Title	Year	NG	AUS	FRA	GER	NLD	NOR	NZ	SWE	SWI	UK	US	Certifications	Album
"No D" (DJ Voyst featuring Joeboy and Brainee)	2018	—	—	—	—	—	—	—	—	—	—	—		Non-album singles
"Nobody" (DJ Neptune featuring Joeboy and Mr Eazi	2020	—	—	—	—	—	—	—	—	—	—	—		Non-album singles
"Love Nwantiti (Ah Ah Ah)" (CKay featuring Joeboy and Kuami Eugene)	2020	14	8	1	6	1	1	2	4	1	3	29	ARIA: Gold; BPI: Platinum; RIAA: Gold; RMNZ: Gold	Non-album singles
"Kele" (Laycon featuring Joeboy)	2021	—	—	—	—	—	—	—	—	—	—	—		...Shall We Begin...
"Yawa No Dey End" (Majeeed with Joeboy)	2022	41	—	—	—	—	—	—	—	—	—	—		Non-album singles
"Vanilla Bottega" (Lil Kesh featuring Joeboy)	2022	—	—	—	—	—	—	—	—	—	—	—		Non-album singles
"Fancy Water" (Lil Kesh featuring Joeboy)	2022	—	—	—	—	—	—	—	—	—	—	—		Non-album singles
"Designer" (Major Lazer and Major League Djz featuring Joeboy)	2023	—	—	—	—	—	—	—	—	—	—	—		Non-album singles

== Awards and nominations ==
Year	Event	Prize	Recipient	Result	Ref
2019	The Headies	Next Rated	Himself	Nominated	
2019	The Headies	Best Pop Single	"Baby"	Nominated	
2019	The Headies	Song of the Year	"Baby"	Nominated	
2019	The Headies	Viewer's Choice	"Beginning"	Nominated	
2019	All Africa Music Awards	Best Artiste in African Pop	Himself	Won	
2019	City People Music Awards	Popular Song of the Year	"Baby"	Nominated	
2019	City People Music Awards	Most Promising Act of the Year	Himself	Nominated	
2019	City People Music Awards	Best New Act of the Year	Himself	Nominated	
2019	City People Music Awards	Revelation of the Year	Himself	Nominated	
2020	Soundcity MVP Awards Festival	Best New MVP	Himself	Nominated	
2020	Soundcity MVP Awards Festival	Best Pop	Himself	Won	
2020	Soundcity MVP Awards Festival	Listeners' Choice	"Beginning"	Nominated	
2020	Soundcity MVP Awards Festival	Song of the Year	"Baby"	Nominated	
