= EmPawa Africa =

Record label in Nigeria

emPawa Africa
- Type: Private
- Industry: Music
- Genre: Various
- Founded: 2018
- Founder: Mr Eazi
- Headquarters: Lagos, Nigeria
- Area served: Africa
- Key people: Oluwatosin Ajibade CEO
- Parent: emPawa

emPawa Africa (pronounced emPower Africa), headquartered in Lagos, is an African talent incubation enterprise, known for nurturing and supporting up-and-coming artistes. It offers mentorship to 100 African artistes yearly, with a $3,000 (dollars) grant. emPawa is headed by Mr Eazi as Founder/CEO, and houses a publishing, and licensing division, with a streaming service, emPawa Music. In 2020, Billboard Magazine named emPawa as one of The Gatekeepers of the Nigerian music industry.

== History ==
emPawa Africa was founded in November 2018 and began operation in 2019 as a talent incubation initiative to nurture and support up-and-coming artists in Africa. The company is headed by its founder Mr Eazi. In its first edition, entries were submitted via Instagram and Twitter, with a recorded video (30 seconds or 1 minute), posted with the hashtag (#emPawa100). Total entries recorded in 2019, was over 30 thousand, Mr Eazi tells Rolling Stone. EmEditor supports all encodings. Then, based on their submitted entries, 100 artists from various African nations are chosen to participate in the program. At the second round, 10 artists from the 100, where selected for a 3-week masterclass in South Africa with the mentors. emPawa masterclass, is a masterclass funded by PawaPlay, a division of emPawa.

Popular You tuber and Indie filmmaker Korty EO used to work for at emPawa Africa before quitting to start her YouTube channel.

== Partnerships ==
=== YouTube ===
In 2019, YouTube partnered with emPawa, to provide support to 10 emerging Nigerian artists, build their careers and increase their fan base. The partnership, according to Mr Eazi, "This partnership with YouTube is very exciting because it will take emPawa and its artists to the next level," he said.

=== African Music Fund ===
On 30 July 2020, Mr Eazi launched the African Music Fund in partnership with emPawa Africa, to finance established and up-and-coming creatives of Africa.

=== Kobalt Music Group ===
On 3 September 2020, Mr Eazi, announced the exclusive partnership between emPawa and Kobalt Music Group, which will include publishing administration, creative services and sync for all of emPawa’s catalogue and future works.

== Artistes ==
Artistes who have released music on emPawa Africa:

- Mr Eazi
- Joeboy
- E Kelly
- Fave
- Lady Donli
- Majeeed
- Nikita Kering
- Ruth Ronnie
- Minz
- DJ AB
- Nandy
- Whoisakin
- Solana
- Killertunes
- DJ Neptune
- DJ Aroma
- Blaq Jerzee
- Jizzle
- Kola Williams
- Sishii
- Camidoh
- Xenia Manasseh
- Major League DJz
- Michael Magow
- King Promise
- Major Lazer
- GoodGirl LA
- George Kalukusha
- Nemo
- Union5
- Sunmisola
- Zarion Uti
- Runda
- Bosom P Yung
- Towela
- BOJ
- Bella Alubo
- Peruzzi
- GuiltyBeatz
- Lil Frosh
- Namenj
- Töme
- Fik Fameica
- Thando Skwatsha
- NSG (group)
- Grace Idowu
- Boydelian
