= Tempoe =

Nigerian record producer and recording artist

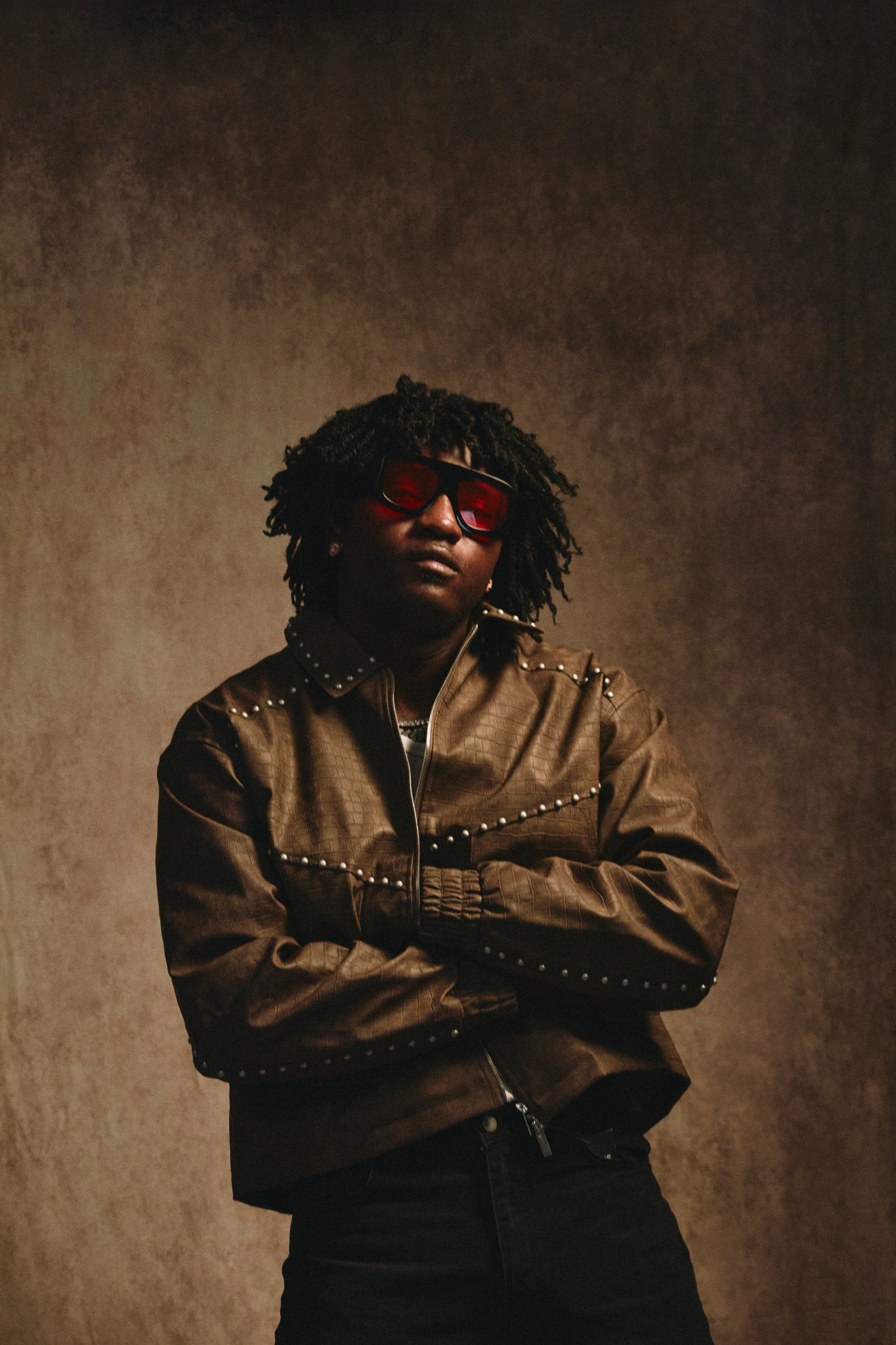

Background information
- Also known as: Tempoe (MÄD!)
- Born: Michael Chigozie Segun Alagwu; Lagos State, Nigeria
- Genres: Afrobeats; pop; hip hop; contemporary R&B
- Occupations: Record producer; DJ; singer; songwriter
- Instruments: Keyboard; synthesizer; drum; shekere; sampler; Vocals
- Years active: 2016–present
- Label: Indie

Michael Chigozie Segun Alagwu (born in Lagos, Nigeria), known professionally as Tempoe, is a Nigerian record producer, songwriter, audio engineer, and recording artist based between Lagos and London. He is widely recognized by the producer tag “MÄD!,” which appears at the start or end of most of his production work. Since entering the industry in 2016, Tempoe has built a catalogue anchored by some of Afrobeats’ biggest crossover records, most notably CKay’s “Love Nwantiti,” which became the first solo Nigerian song to surpass one billion streams on Spotify, reached the top three of the UK Official Singles Chart, and peaked at number 26 on the Billboard Hot 100. The song has been certified 8× Platinum by the RIAA in the United States.

Beyond “Love Nwantiti,” Tempoe has produced or co-produced hit singles for Omah Lay (“Godly,” “Understand,” “Soso”), Joeboy(“Door,” “Sip (Alcohol),” “SMH”), and Victony (“Soweto,” on which he also appears as a credited performer). He has since expanded into executive production, most visibly on Joeboy’s third studio album Viva

Lavida (2025), producing or co-producing the majority of the tracks on Omah Lay’s 2026 sophomore album Clarity of Mind, where his work shaped the album’s overall sound and gave it its sonic direction. He also produced “With You,” Davido and Omah Lay’s collaboration nominated for Best African Music Performance at the 2026 Grammy Awards.

His work has drawn recognition from the African Muzik Magazine Awards(AFRIMMA), which nominated him for African Producer of the Year in 2022; the BMI Awards, which honored his work on “Love Nwantiti” at the 2022 BMI Awards in London and again at the 2023 BMI Pop Awards; and The Headies, which gave him three nominations in 2023, Producer of the Year (for “Soweto”), plus Best Recording of the Year and Viewers’ Choice for the song itself. Rolling Stone placed “Soweto” at number 15 on its list of the 40 best Afropop songs of 2022. As of late 2025, Tempoe held three RIAA certifications for his production work: Gold for “Soweto” and Omah Lay’s “Soso,” and 8× Platinum for “Love Nwantiti,” which first reached Gold certification in January 2022 before climbing further.

== Musical career ==
Tempoe began his career as a statistician, designer and web developer in Nigeria's budding tech industry. He had always found pleasure in music, teaching himself basic production techniques using the fFruity Lops app and producing songs for free, before a chance meeting with then aAfrobeats producer CKayled to him producing the latter's first official single, "Nkechi Turnup" in 2016. He went on to produce other songs, such as Container for CKay and Play for Blaqbonez, both signed to Chocolate City. In a bid to improve his production skills, he enrolled at Sarz's Production Academy.

In 2019, Tempoe collaborated again with CKay in the production of the afro-fusion single, Love Nwantiti. The track has been certified platinum in France and the United Kingdom and double platinum in the United States and the Netherlands. In November 2020, Tempoe teamed up with singer Omah Lay, producing another successful single, Godly, which garnered over 100 million accumulated streams across all music sharing platforms, peaking at number 5 and number 15 in Ghana and Kenya's top 100 tracks on iTunes. Tempoe also produced the single Door from Joeboy's debut album, Somewhere Between Beauty & Magic, and Sip (Alcohol), which received 50 million streams within four weeks of its release.

In May 2022, he produced and performed in the single, Soweto, the lead track off Victony's Outlaw EP, which is his first official single as a performing artiste. Tempoe released the video for Soweto in October 2022. The video was directed by Jyde Ajala and garnered over 8 million views on YouTube within four weeks. The song featured at number 15 on Rolling Stone magazine's Top 40 Afropop Songs of 2022.

In 2022, Tempoe signed a publishing deal with American independent record publishing group, APG, and the partnership led to his being tapped to co-write and produce Robinson and Jason Derulo's single Ayo Girl, which features fellow Nigerian afrobeat act, Rema.

== Charts and certifications ==
S/N	Song	Charts/Certifications
1	“Love Nwantiti”	RIAA 8× Platinum (US); Diamond (France, SNEP); first solo Nigerian song to pass 1 billion Spotify streams; No. 1, Billboard U.S. Afrobeats Songs chart (2022); UK Official Singles Chart Top 3; No. 26, Billboard Hot 100
2	“Soweto”	RIAA Gold (US, certified 15 September 2025); charted in the UK, Canada, Netherlands and Switzerland; No. 15, Rolling Stone Top 40 Afropop Songs of 2022.
3	“Soso” (Omah Lay)	RIAA Gold (US)
4	“Godly”	No. 1 for a record 11 weeks on the TurnTable Top 50; No. 5 Ghana iTunes Top 100; No. 15, Kenya iTunes Top 100; 150M+ plays on YouTube Music; 100M+ Spotify streams.
5	“Sip (Alcohol)”	Nigeria (TCSN) 4× Platinum; No. 1, TurnTable Top 50 (nine consecutive weeks); UK Afrobeats Chart peak No. 2.
6	“Understand”	No. 1, TurnTable Top 50 (three weeks).

== Awards and recognition ==
Tempoe received a nomination for the African Producer of the Year at the 2022 African Muzik Magazine Awards (AFRIMMA) alongside Pheelz from Nigeria and DJ Maphoriza from South Africa in September 2022. In October 2022, he was honored by BMI at the BMI Awards London for his contribution to the song Love Nwantiti in the category of Most Performed Song of the Year. He was listed in the TurnTable End of the Year Top 50 of 2021 as a Top Producer of the Year.

Year	Event	Prize	Recipient	Result	Ref
2021	The Beatz Awards 2021	Afro Dancehall Producer of the Year	Himself for "Godly" by Omah Lay	Nominated	
2022	African Muzik Magazine Awards (AFRIMMA)	African Producer of the Year	Himself	Nominated	
2022	BMI Awards London	Most Performed Song of the Year	Love Nwantiti	Won	
2022	Rolling Stone	Top 40 Afropop Songs of 2022 (“Soweto,” No. 15)	Soweto	Listed	
2023	AFRIMMA Awards	African Producer of the Year	Tempoe	Nominated	
2023	The Headies (16th edition)	Producer of the Year (“Soweto”)	Tempoe	Nominated	
2023	The Headies (16th edition)	Best Recording of the Year (“Soweto,” with Victony)	Soweto	Nominated	
2023	The Headies (16th edition)	Viewers’ Choice (“Soweto”)	Soweto	Nominated	
2025	AFRIMMA Awards	Producer of the Year	Tempoe	Nominated	
2025	Grammy Awards	Best African Music Performance Category	With You	Nominated	

== Achievements ==
Tempoe has produced several internationally certified recordings, including CKay's ''Love Nwantiti'', Omah Lay's ''Soso'', and Victony and Tempoe's ''Soweto''. These songs have received Gold, Platinum, and Multi-Platinum certifications across multiple territories, including the United States, the United Kingdom, France, Canada, and Nigeria.

== Production discography ==
- 2016
1. Nkechi Turnup - CKay
2. Container - Ckay
3. Play - Blaqbonez
- 2019
1. Love Nwantiti - CKay
2. Jensimi - Reminisce featuring Niniola
- 2020
1. Godly - Omah Lay
2. Party Dé - DJ Lambo featuring Buju
- 2021
1. Understand - Omah Lay
2. Bend You - Omah Lay
3. Door - Joeboy
4. Soso - Omah Lay
5. Alcohol (Sip) - Joeboy
6. Purple Song - Omah Lay
7. Piece of Mind - Mayorkun
8. 100 Metres - Teni
9. On - Teni
10. Door (remix) - Joeboy Featuring Kwesi Arthur
- 2022
1. The Front Door - MI Abaga featuring Duncan Mighty
2. Soweto - Victony and Tempoe
3. Ayo Girl - Robinson and Jason Derulo featuring Rema
4. Contour - Joeboy
5. Iz Going - Bad Boy Timz
6. Something to Lose - Wurld
7. Press - Wurld
8. Same as You - Wurld
9. Mine - Blanche Bailly and Joeboy
10. Winter Wonderland/Don't Worry be Happy - Omah Lay
