= 2020 in African music =

The following is a list of events and releases that happened in 2020 in African music.

== Events ==
- 18 March - It is announced that Cameroonian musician Manu Dibango has tested positive for coronavirus.
- 21 March - The Tenor Foundation for Culture launches an initiative, in collaboration with the Moroccan Philharmonic Orchestra (OPM), the International School of Music and Dance (EIDM), and the Mazaya Sociocultural Program, to stream live concerts to viewers in Morocco.
- 30 June - Ethiopia's internet is taken down by the government amid unrest brought about by the shooting of musician and political activist Hachalu Hundessa.
- 25 December - Nigerian singers Yemi Alade and Naira Marley make their acting debut in the film Omo Ghetto: The Saga, released on this date.

== Albums released in 2020 ==
Release date	Artist	Album	Genre	Label	Ref
January	Les Amazones d'Afrique	Amazones Power	AfroPop/Funk/Blues	Real World Records	
January 17	Yung L	Juice & Zimm	Afrobeats	Zimmlife	
February 7	Obongjayar	Which Way is Forward? (EP)	R&B, Afrobeat	September Recordings	
February 10	Olamide	999 (EP)	Hip-Hop, Rap, Afropop	YBNL Nation	
February 14	Yaa Yaa	Agoo	Highlife, Afropop	Indie	
February 28	2Baba	Warriors	Afropop	Hypertek Digital	
March 6	M.I Abaga	Judah (EP)	Hip hop	Chocolate City	
March	Tamikrest	Tamotait	Desert blues /Tuareg	Glitterbeat	
March 20	A-Q	God's Engineering	Afropop, Hip-hop	Dvpper Music Distribution	
March 27	Sound Sultan	8th Wondah	R&B, Afrobeat, Hip-Hop	Naija Ninjas; Dvpper Music Distribution	
April 1	Brymo	Yellow	Alternative pop	Indie	
April 1	Laycon	Who Is Laycon?	Afrobeat	F.N.E. Ltd	
April 3	Darkovibes	Kpanlogo	Hip-Hop, Afropop, Afrobeats	Indie	
April 3	GuiltyBeatz	Different (EP)	Afrobeats	Banku Music	
April 10	Edoheart	For the Love (EP)	Pop	Indie	
April 15	M.I Abaga and A-Q	The Live Report (EP)	Hip-hop	Incredible Music; Cordless	
April 17	Dremo	Codename Vol. 2	Afropop, hip-hop, Afrobeats	Davido Music Worldwide	
April 20	Shatta Wale	The Manacles of Shatta (EP)	Reggae	Shatta Movement Empire	
April 24	Stonebwoy	Anloga Junction	Afropop, Dancehall, Reggae	Burniton Music Group	
May 1	Asikey	Yellow (EP)	Folk, EDM, R&B/Alternative	Indie	
May 5	Joey B	Lava Feels	Hip-Hop, R&B	World Records	
May 8	Deon Boakye	Legendary Journey (EP)	Afropop, Highlife	–	
May 8	Dr SID	The Interesting EP	Afrobeats	Mavin Records	
May 14	Ike Moriz	Dragons	Pop, Rock, Dance	Mosquito Records London	
May 15	WurlD	Afrosoul (EP)	Afrobeats	Immensum Music	
May 22	Vector & Mastaa	Crossroads (EP)	Hip-Hop, Rap	GRAP Entertainment	
May 29	9ice	Tip of the Iceberg: Episode 1	Afrobeats	AAR	
May 29	iLLBLISS	Illy Chapo X	Hip-Hop, Rap	Mad Solutions	
May 29	Jesse Jagz	Garba (EP)	Hip-Hop	Jagz Nation	
June 1	Jayso	0106, Vol. 5	Hip-Hop, Rap	Skillions Global	
June 5	Sauti Sol	Midnight Train	Afropop	Sauti Sol Entertainment	
June 5	Yung6ix	Introduction to Trapfro	Hip-Hop, Rap	Billionaires Circle	
June 12	Bumi Thomas	Broken Silence (EP)	Soul	528 Music Global	
June 12	Idahams	Man On Fire (EP)	Afropop	Grafton Entertainment; Universal Music Group Nigeria	
June 19	Skales	Healing Process (EP)	Afropop, Pop	OHK Entertainment	
June 25	Kizz Daniel	King of Love	Afrobeats, Pop, R&B	Fly Boy Inc.	
June 26	Jaywon	Aje The Mixtape	Pop	Next World Music	
July 2	Medikal	Island (EP)	Hip-Hop, Afrobeat	AMG Beyond Kontrol	
July 3	Mercy Chinwo	Satisfied	Gospel, Christian	EeZee Conceptz	
July 3	Keleketla!	Keleketla!	Electronic	Ahead Of Our Time	
July 3	Praiz	To the Moon (EP)	Afropop	Cicada Music	
July 4	Fancy Gadam	Dream	Afropop, Dancehall	Sultan Incorporation	
July 17	Krizbeatz	African Time	Afropop	Streets Legend	
July 24	Selebobo	Bobo of Africa (EP)	Afropop	Vault Records	
July 29	Reminisce	Vibes & Insha Allah (EP)	Hip-Hop, Rap, Afrobeats	Lesrosesrouge Entertainment	
August 8	B-Red	The Jordan Album	R&B, Afropop	The Plug Entertainment	
August 14	Harrysong	Right About Now	Afropop	Altar Plate	
August 14	Terry Apala and Majorbangz	Major Vibes (EP)	Afrobeat	Wemba Management	
August 14	Burna Boy	Twice as Tall	Afrobeats, Dancehall, Hip Hop	Atlantic	
August 16	Evi Edna Ogholi	Peace and Love	Reggae	Enorecords LLC	
August 19	Fireboy DML	Apollo	Afro-fusion, Afrobeats	YBNL Nation; Empire	
August 20	Ismaël Isaac	Qui va nous sauver?	Reggae	Obouo Productions	
August 21	DJ Lambo	A Tale of Two Cities	Afropop, Hip-Hop	707 Worldwide	
August 21	Cuppy	Original Copy	Afrobeats	Red Velvet Music Group	
August 21	K1 De Ultimate	Fuji the Sound (EP)	Fuji, Pop	K1 Music Entertainment	
August 21	Adekunle Gold	Afro Pop Vol. 1	Afropop	EMI (UMG)	
August 22	Kpanto	Skinny Boy Kpanto	Hipco	Holy Records	
August 27	Tiwa Savage	Celia	Afrobeats, R&B, Pop	UMG, Motown, Island Records, Capitol	
August 27	Patoranking	Three	Reggae, Dancehall	Amari Musiq	
August 28	Kwaw Kese	Victory	Hip-Hop	Crux Global / MOVES Recordings	
August 28	Seether	Si Vis Pacem, Para Bellum	Rock		
August 28	Nasty C	Zulu Man With Some Power	Hip Hop, Trap	Def Jam	
September 2	Eedris Abdulkareem	Nothing But The Truth	Afrobeats, Hip-Hop, Rap	Blue Pie Records	
September 4	Apex and Bionic	Nobody Holy	Pop	JFK Resolute Entertainment	
September 4	LKT	The Dark Abyss	Hip Hop, Rap	Indie	
September 10	Wande Coal	Realms (EP)	Afrobeats	Starstruck / EMPIRE	
September 14	Jahdiel	Grace (EP)	Christian	Hammer House Records	
September 14	MOG Music	The Experience	Christian, Gospel	Indie	
September 16	Mix Naija and T-Classic	Alirat (EP)	Afrobeats	Majik Naija Entertainment	
September 17	Fameye	Greater Than	Afrobeats	EMPIRE	
September 25	Tems	For Broken Ears	alt-R&B	Leading Vibe Ltd	
September 25	BANTU	Everybody Get Agenda	Afrobeats	Soledad Productions	
September 27	Diana Hopeson	Hope (Volume 1)	Gospel, Christian	Indie	
October 2	Simi	Restless II	R&B, Soul	PLATOON	
October 2	Niniola	Colours and Sounds	Afrobeat, Dance, Electronic	DRUMROLL RECORDS	
October 8	Olamide	Carpe Diem	Afropop, Rap, Reggae fusion	YBNL Nation / EMPIRE	
October 9	Darey	Way Home (EP)	Afrobeats, R&B	Livespot Entertainment	
October 9	Kuami Eugene	Son of Africa	Afropop, Highlife, Afrobeats	Lynx Entertainment	
October 16	Le Deal, featuring Malick Koly	Jazz Traficantes	Jazz	A&R	
October 16	Lionel Loueke	HH	Smooth jazz, Jazz	Edition Records	
October 30	Rocky Dawuni	Voice of Bunbon, Vol. 1 (EP)	Reggae	Aquarian Records	
October 30	Wizkid	Made in Lagos	Afrobeats, Hip Hop, Pop	Starboy (RCA)	
November 5	Brymo	Libel (EP)	Alternative	Clockwyce Distributions	
November 6	Kelvyn Boy	Blackstar	Afrobeat, Afropop	Crux Global / MOVES Recordings	
November 10	King of Accra	Adulthood	Afrobeats	Indie	
November 11	Larry Gaaga	Rattle Snake	Afropop	Poles Music	
November 12	Amaarae	The Angel You Don't Know	R&B, Afro-fusion, Pop	GOLDEN CHILD LLC.	
November 12	Davido	A Better Time	Afrobeats, Pop, Dancehall	Sony	
November 13	Darkovibes	The Cornerstone	Hip-Hop	Indie	
November 20	Basketmouth	Yabasi	Highlife	Barons World Records	
November 20	Yemi Alade	Empress	Afrobeats, Highlife, Soul, Pop, Dancehall	Effyzzie Music Group	
December 10	Tekno	Old Romance	Afrobeats, Highlife, Soul, Pop,	Island Records	

== Classical ==
- Michael Blake
  - Mémoriale, for large symphony orchestra
  - Nattlige Toner/Night Music (film score, arranged for violin and harp)

== Musical films ==
- LOUD, starring Sophie Alakija and Eucharia Anunobi
- Lady Buckit and the Motley Mopsters (animation), with music by DJ Klem and Ava Momoh

== Deaths ==
- January 19 - Allah Thérèse, age unknown, Ivorian traditional singer
- February 1 - Kofi B, age unknown, Ghanaian highlife musician (heart attack)
- February 9 - Abdel Aziz El Mubarak, 69, Sudanese singer (pneumonia)
- February 11 - Joseph Shabalala, 78, South African musician (Ladysmith Black Mambazo).
- February 12 - Victor Olaiya, 89, Nigerian highlife trumpeter
- February 15 - Prince Kudakwashe Musarurwa, 31, Zimbabwean Afro Jazz singer, songwriter, producer and musician
- February 16 - Erickson Le Zulu, 41 Ivorian disc jockey and singer
- February 17 - Kizito Mihigo, 38, Rwandan gospel singer.
- March 18 - Kenneth Kafui, age unknown, Ghanaian composer
- March 19 - Aurlus Mabélé, 66, Congolese singer and composer, the "King of Soukous"
- March 24 - Manu Dibango, 86, Cameroonian musician and saxophonist (COVID-19)
- April 7 - Hudeydi, 91, Somali musician
- April 14
  - Akin Euba, 84, Nigerian composer, musicologist, and pianist
  - Kasongo wa Kanema, 73, Congolese musician (Orchestra Super Mazembe).
- April 30 – Tony Allen, 79, Nigerian drummer, composer and songwriter (abdominal aortic aneurysm)
- May 22 – Mory Kanté, 70, Guinean singer and musician
- June 1 – Majek Fashek, 57, Nigerian reggae singer and songwriter
- June 12
  - Dodo Doris, 71, Congolese musician (Orchestra Super Mazembe)
    - Claude Ndam, 65, Cameroonian singer-songwriter
- June 14 – Mama Nguéa, 60, Cameroonian singer (diabetes)
- June 15
  - Omondi Long'lilo, 37, Kenyan Benga musician (cancer)
  - Nana Tuffour, 66, Ghanaian highlife singer
- June 23 – Xabiiba Cabdilaahi, 58, Djiboutian singer
- June 29 – Hachalu Hundessa, 34, Ethiopian singer-songwriter (shot)
- July 10 – Cosmas Magaya, 67, Zimbabwean mbira musician (COVID-19)
- August 27 – Meridjo Belobi, 67, Congolese drummer, former member of Zaïko Langa Langa and inventor of Cavacha
- September 21 – Hamdi Benani, 77, Algerian singer and violinist
- October 18 – Naâma, 86, Tunisian singer
- November 19 – Mshoza, 37, South African kwaito singer

== See also ==
- 2020 in music
