= Tekno discography =

Musician discography

- Studio albums: 1
- Compilation albums: 0
- Singles: 35
- Music videos: 26
- Promotional singles: 3
- Guest appearances: 25
- Cameo appearances: 1

The discography of Tekno, a Nigerian singer-songwriter and record producer consists of one studio album, 36 singles (including seven as featured artist), ten music videos, four promotional single, five guest appearances, produced 15 songs and 5 cameo appearance.

== Albums ==
Title	Album details
Old Romance	Released: 10 December 2020; Label: Island Records, Cartel Entertainment; Format: CD, digital download

== Singles ==
=== As lead artist ===
List of singles as lead artist, with selected chart positions
Title	Year	Album
"Holiday" (featuring Davido)	2013	Non-album singles
"Onye Ne Kwu (Remix)" (featuring Ice Prince)	2013	Non-album singles
"Dance"	2014	Non-album singles
"Shoki" (with B-Red)	2014	Non-album singles
"Anything"	2014	Non-album singles
"Duro"	2015	Non-album singles
"Duro (Remix)" (featuring Flavour and Phyno)	2015	Non-album singles
"Wash"	2015	Non-album singles
"Maria" (featuring Selebobo)	2015	Non-album singles
"Where"	2016	Non-album singles
"Pana"	2016	Non-album singles
"Diana"	2016	Non-album singles
"Rara"	2016	Non-album singles
"Yawa"	2017	Non-album singles
"Be"	2017	Non-album singles
"Samantha"	2017	Non-album singles
"Go"	2017	Non-album singles
"Mama" (featuring Wizkid)	2017	Non-album singles
"Only One"	2017	Non-album singles
"Anyhow" (featuring OG, Flimzy, and Selebobo)	2018	Non-album singles
"Yur Luv"	2018	Non-album singles
"Jogodo"	2018	Non-album singles
"Choko"	2018	Non-album singles
"On You"	2018	Non-album singles
"Woman"	2019	Non-album singles
"Uptempo"	2019	Non-album singles
"Agege" (featuring Zlatan)	2019	Non-album singles
"Better"	2019	Non-album singles
"Skeletun"	2019	Non-album singles
"Suru"	2019	Non-album singles
"Beh Beh" (with Masterkraft)	2020	Non-album singles
"Kata"	2020	Non-album singles
"Sudden"	2020	Non-album singles
"Puttin"	2020	Non-album singles
"Enjoy"	2020	Old Romance
"Enjoy (Remix)" (featuring Mafikizolo)	2021	Non-album singles
"Mufasa"	2022	Non-album singles
"Jinja"	2022	Non-album singles
"After Party"	2022	Non-album singles
"Pay"	2022	Non-album singles
"Freetown"	2023	Non-album singles
"Peace of Mind"	2023	The More the Better
"Peppermint"	2023	The More the Better
"So What?" (with Shallipopi)	2023	Presido La Pluto
"Pocket"	2023	The More the Better
"Away"	2023	Non-album single
"Wayo"	2024	Non-album single
"Gon Gon"	2024	Non-album single
"No Forget"	2024	Non-album single
"Jericho"	2024	Non-album single
"Pounds and Dollars"	2024	Non-album single
"Alhaji"	2025	Non-album single
"Powerbank"	2025	Non-album single

== Promotional singles ==
List of promotional singles
Title	Year	Album
"Go Low"	2011	Non-album singles
"Mess"	2012	Non-album singles
"Onyenekwu"	2012	Non-album singles
"Azonto"	2012	Non-album singles
"Rakaka (Senseless)" (with GospelOnDeBeatz)	2012	Non-album singles
"Making Money" (with Rotji)	2013	

== Records produced ==
Year	Title	Album
2014	"Show" (Victoria Kimani)	Non-album single
2015	"Feeling You" (Rima featuring Tekno)	Non-album single
2015	"Pray For You" (Lynxxx featuring Tekno)	Non-album single
2015	"Boss" (Ice Prince)	Jos to the World
2016	"Last Station" (Stonebwoy featuring Tekno)	Non-album single
2017	"If" (Davido)	A Good Time
2017	"Catch You" (Flavour)	Ijele the Traveler
2017	"Silika" (Madee featuring Tekno)	Non-album single
2017	"Go" (Tekno)	Non-album single
2017	"Green Light" (DJ Cuppy featuring Tekno)	Non-album single
2018	"Jogodo"	Non-album single
2019	"Agege" (Zlatan Ibile featuring Tekno)	Non-album single
2019	"Won't Be Late" (Swae Lee featuring Drake)	Non-album single

== Music videos ==
=== As lead artist ===
List of music videos as lead artist, showing date released and directors
Title	Video release date	Director(s)	Ref
“Dance”	March 26, 2014	Sesan	
“Anything”	December 14, 2014	Teekay	
“Wash”	December 3, 2015	Aje Films	
“ Pana”	August 12, 2016	Clarence Peters	
“Diana”	October 21, 2016	Teekay	
“Rara"	March 17, 2017	Director Q	
“Yawa”	March 22, 2017	Patrick Elis	
“Go”	August 2, 2017	Patrick Elis	

=== As featured artist ===
List of music videos as featured artist, showing date released and directors
Title	Video release date	Director(s)	Ref
"Erima" (Kris Beatz featuring Tekno & Davido)	May 5, 2017	Cardoso Imagery	
“Buga” (Kizz Daniel featuring Tekno)	June 20, 2022	TG Omori	
