= Believe (Sugarboy album) =

Studio album by Sugarboy
- Released: 22 April 2017
- Genre: Afro-pop; Reggae
- Length: 87:54
- Label: G-Worldwide Entertainment
- Producer: Emperor Geezy (exec.); Bangaz; Young John; DJ Coublon; BeatBurx; Tony Ross; Da Genius; Luis AMG; Papi J; CMelony

Singles from Believe
- 1. "Hola Hola" Released: 16 January 2016; 2. "Double" Released: 15 June 2016; 3. "Legalize" Released: 17 October 2016; 4. "Dada Omo" Released: 3 January 2017

Believe is the debut studio album by Nigerian singer and songwriter Sugarboy. It was released on 22 April 2017, through G-Worldwide Entertainment. Exclusively produced by Emperor Geezy with additional productions from Young John, DJ Coublon, BeatBurx, Tony Ross, Da Genius, Luis AMG, Papi J, CMelony, and Bangaz. The album features label mate Kiss Daniel, with lead single "Hola Hola".

== Background ==
Sugarboy told Nigerian Entertainment Today, on March 2, 2017, why Kiss Daniel was the only featured artiste on his debut album "Not featuring any other artiste on my album asides Kiss Daniel who I collaborated with on two tracks is part of the label's strategy". On 5 March 2017, he told The Punch that "There are 22 songs on the album but I had to record about 40 tracks, before selecting".

== Singles and promotion ==
In 2016, Sugarboy released the lead single "Hola Hola" on 16 January 2016, while working on the studio album. On 28 February 2017, he announced the release date of his album, to be released on 22 April 2016 through G-Worldwide Entertainment. "Hola Hola" debut at number 7 on Nigeria Playdata charts, and MTV Base Hottest Naija Tracks of 2017. The album's second single "Double", was released on 15 June 2016 and produced by BeatBurx. The music video was directed by Mattmax.

The third single, "Legalize", was released on 17 October 2016, produced by . The video, directed by Adasa Cookey. The fourth single, "Dada Omo", was produced by DJ Coublon and released on 3 January 2017. The music video, was filmed and directed by Aje Filmworks. On 22 April 2017, Sugarboy held a musical concert at the Grand Ballroom of the Oriental Hotel, in Lagos, to promote Believe, with an album listening session hosted by Jimmie Akinsola, with music from DJ Shabsy, and DJ Kaywise. The Believe album lunch concert, line-up includes labelmate Kiss Daniel, and supported by Simi, Reekado Banks, Sean Tizzle, Emma Nyra, Lil Kesh, Runtown, Iyanya, Kcee, Praiz, Ice Prince, Chidinma, Yung6ix, Mr 2Kay, CDQ, Mayorkun, Dremo, and many more.

== Critical reception ==
Professional ratings
Review scores
Source	Rating
Pulse Nigeria	1/5 stars

Believe received reviews from music critics. A writer for Pulse Nigeria, Jonathan said "You can’t believe in Sugarboy" and described the songs on the album as "fluffy pop layered over his light vocals". And said, "the album came too early for Sugarboy". Reviewing for Music in Africa, music journalist Oris Aigbokhaevbolo said "There are only a few pure failures on Believe; its major flaw is the blur of monotony in the middle and the album’s endless length. But there are a number of worthy tracks like "Legalize", "Holla Holla", and "Kilamity" work still". He closed the review, saying "If the title is asking for belief in the album, then it is too much to ask". And said, "What Sugarboy's Believe needs is a massive promotion from the record label and tolerance from its listeners".

== Track listing ==
All tracks are written by Umaren Akanimoh Felix, except 10 & 18.

Believe track listing
No.	Title	Writer(s)	Producer(s)	Length
1.	"Stunt Gidi"	Umaren Akanimoh Felix	Beatburx	2:55
2.	"Neighbour"	Umaren Akanimoh Felix	DJ Coublon	3:42
3.	"Double"	Umaren Akanimoh Felix	BeatBurx	3:44
4.	"Bar Man"	Umaren Akanimoh Felix	Tony Ross	3:24
5.	"Jofunmi"	Umaren Akanimoh Felix	Da Genius	3:25
6.	"Informa"	Umaren Akanimoh Felix	BeatBurx	3:51
7.	"Dada Omo"	Umaren Akanimoh Felix	DJ Coublon	3:34
8.	"Mad"	Umaren Akanimoh Felix	BeatBurx	3:21
9.	"Know"	Umaren Akanimoh Felix	BeatBurx	3:23
10.	"Kilamity" (featuring Kiss Daniel)	Umaren Akanimoh Felix; Oluwatobiloba Daniel	Luis AMG	4:00
11.	"Love You"	Umaren Akanimoh Felix	Papi J	3:38
12.	"Tomorrow"	Umaren Akanimoh Felix	BeatBurx	4:19
13.	"Osomo De"	Umaren Akanimoh Felix	BeatBurx	3:54
14.	"Seri Koko"	Umaren Akanimoh Felix	Young John	3:23
15.	"Blessing"	Umaren Akanimoh Felix	BeatBurx	3:46
16.	"Baby Oku"	Umaren Akanimoh Felix	BeatBurx	3:30
17.	"Socialite"	Umaren Akanimoh Felix	BeatBurx	4:20
18.	"Ekene" (featuring Kiss Daniel)	Umaren Akanimoh Felix; Oluwatobiloba Daniel	CMelony; Bangaz	3:20
19.	"Hola Hola"	Umaren Akanimoh Felix	BeatBurx	3:42
20.	"Pata Were"	Umaren Akanimoh Felix	BeatBurx	2:54
21.	"Legalize"	Umaren Akanimoh Felix	BeatBurx	3:13
22.	"Wicked"	Umaren Akanimoh Felix	BeatBurx	2:36
Total length:				87:54

== Release history ==
Region	Date	Format	Label
Various	April 22, 2017	CD; digital download; streaming	G-Worldwide Entertainment
