= Benjamz =

Nigerian record producer

- Also known as: Benjamz
- Born: Chibuike Benjamin Nnonah; September 22, 1994 (age 31); Enugu, Nigeria
- Origin: Enugu
- Genres: Afropop; Afrobeats; African hip hop; hip hop; gangsta rap; R&B
- Occupation: Record producer
- Instruments: Piano, drums, guitar
- Years active: 2016–present
- Labels: Maxibeats; Jungleciti Entertainment; Illbeats Music Group

Chibuike Benjamin Nnonah (born September 22, 1994), born in Enugu State, better known as Benjamz, is a Nigerian record producer who has worked with artists including Phyno, Burna Boy, Dremo, Tekno, Illbliss and Yung6ix. He was born and raised in Enugu. Benjamz produced six tracks from Phyno's The Playmaker album. He is most notable for co-producing African Giant by Burna Boy with Kel-P, which was nominated for a Grammy Award. He also produced "Gum Body" featuring Jorja Smith from the same album and "Stfu" from Codename Vol. 2 by Dremo.

== Early life ==
Benjamz is a native of Agbani in Nkanu West Enugu State. He is a graduate of industrial physics from the Enugu State University of Science and Technology.

== Career ==
His breakthrough as a record producer came in 2016, when he produced the track "Pino Pino" by Phyno off his The Playmaker album. In 2017, he was nominated in the "New" Discovery Producer category at the 2017 edition of The Beatz Awards. Benjamz has gone on to produce and be credited in popular songs and albums including The Playmaker by Phyno, African Giant by Burna Boy, Old Romance by Tekno, Codename Vol. 2 by Dremo and Deal with It by Phyno. He was given a special recognition by the Grammy academy for his work on African Giant by Burna Boy

=== Production credits ===
- African Giant - Burna Boy (Co-Produced with Kel-P)
- Gum Body ft Jorja Smith - Burna Boy
- Pino Pino - Phyno
- Deal With It - Phyno'
- I'm a Fan - Phyno
- Mistakes - Phyno
- Deri - Phyno
- Iyilu Ife - Phyno
- Bigger Meat - Dremo
- Chairman - Dremo
- Breezy - Dremo
- Faya - Dremo
- Stfu - Dremo
- Nobody - Dremo
- Armageddon - Tekno
- 40ft Containers ft Olamide - Illbliss
- Wake Up - Yung6ix

== Album credits ==
Year	Artiste	Album
2016	Phyno	’’The Playmaker’’
2019	Burna Boy	’’African Giant’’
2020	Tekno (musician)	’’Old Romance’’
2020	Dremo	Codename Vol. 2

== Awards and nominations ==
Year	Event	Prize	Recipient	Result
2017	The Beatz Awards	New Discovery Producer	Benjamz for "Pino Pino" by Phyno	Won
2020	62nd Annual Grammy Awards	Special Recognition	Benjamz for African Giant by Burna Boy	Nominated
