= Playdata charts =

Nigeria inactive airplay chart

Playdata Charts
- Successor: TurnTable Charts
- Formation: 10 January 2016
- Founded: 2015
- Founder: eLDee; Kingsley Offor
- Dissolved: 2018
- Legal status: Defunct
- Location: Lagos, Nigeria
- Owner: Playdata
- Key people: eLDee (CEO)
- Website: www.playdatacharts.com

Playdata charts was a weekly airplay chart, measuring songs being played on the radio, and television stations in Nigeria, and published on its website, with data gathered from its proprietary PlayData Broadcast Monitoring service. It provides a weekly top 100 airplay chart (previously top 10 until 2017), and a yearly top 40 chart (previously top 100 unit 2017). Its first chart issue was released on 10 January 2016, led by Adekunle Gold "Pick Up". It serves as Nigeria's airplay chart from 10 January 2016, to 31 December 2017.

== Overview ==
Playdata was founded in 2015 by eLDee, and Kingsley Offor, as a cloud-based broadcast monitoring software. In 2016, it chart began full operation tracking Television and Radio airplay. Playdata provides intellectual property information on play count, where they are played from, and on (TV/Radio stations). On 20 March 2015, Playdata had monitored 23 Ad's campaigns, 5,236 musical works. It released a report, monitoring 5,000 radio or TV stations across two continents, which is just 2000+ lower than the number of radio stations being tracked by Digital Radio Tracker. Kingsley Offor who became the first CEO of Playdata was succeeded by eLDee, on 20 January 2016, after he retired as a musician.

In February 2016, at the Future of Music in Africa at Social Media Week Lagos, eLDee shares demo insight about Playdata and shows artists statistics of how many times their music is played on radio stations, during the presentation. On 10 February 2016, Playdata was introduced to Spinlet, a now defunct music streaming company. In 2018, Playdata was defunct shortly after publishing its second edition of the Year-end chart of 2017, titled Top 40 songs on Nigerian radio, in the week of January 1, 2018, led by Davido "If".

On 24 March 2018, Playdata presented the “Artist of the Year” plague to Wizkid, as the most played artist on Nigerian radio in 2017.

== Chart achievements ==
According to The Guardian, "Mad Over You", is one of the most played songs in Nigeria, and almost charted for ten weeks, on the Nigeria Playdata radio chart.

=== Songs with most weeks at number one ===
16 Weeks

- Tekno - "Pana" (2016)

11 weeks

- Phyno - "Fada Fada (Ghetto Gospel)" (2016)

8 Weeks

- Runtown - "Mad Over You" (2017)
