= Mufasa (disambiguation) =

Mufasa is a fictional lion and Simba's father in The Lion King.

Mufasa may also refer to:

- Hyundai Mufasa, a compact crossover SUV
- "Mufasa" (song), a 2022 single by Tekno
- Mufasa: The Lion King, a 2024 film directed by Barry Jenkins
  - Mufasa: The Lion King (soundtrack), the film's soundtrack
