= Yung Willis =

Nigerian record producer and musician

- Also known as: Willisgivedem
- Born: Daniel Williams; January 18, 1996 (age 30); Abuja, Nigeria
- Genres: Afrobeats; pop; hip hop; contemporary R&B; Amapiano
- Occupations: Record producer; singer; songwriter
- Instruments: Keyboard; synthesizer; drum; shekere; sampler; Vocals
- Years active: 2018–present
- Label: Royals Music

Daniel Williams (born January 18 1996), professionally known as Yung Willis is a Nigerian record producer,singer and songwriter.Known for producing and co producing some of Afrobeats’ hits records, most notably "99" which Peak 2 on the UK Afrobeats Singles Chart, number 1 on TurnTable Top 100 and No. 12 on Billboard U.S. Afrobeats Songs and Buga which reached No. 1 on Apple Music's Nigeria Top 100 chart three days after its release, number 1 on TurnTable Top 100 for seven weeks and became the most Shazamed song in the world. He peaked 6 on the TurnTable Official producer top 100 chart and spent 172 weeks on the chart.

== Early life and education ==
Daniel Williams was born and grew up in Abuja, Nigeria. Willis graduated from Afe Babalola University, where he studied International Relations in 2015.

== Career ==
Yung Willis started producing songs in 2018. where he produced "Sweet Boy", a song by Nigerian rapper Falz. In 2019, He worked with Falz on another song titled "Talk". The song which won the Headies Award for Best Rap Single. In 2020, Willis produced Phyno and DJ Kaywise's "Highway" and "Squander" by Falz featuring Niniola. In 2021, he produced "Cold Outside" by Timaya featuring BNXN, the song reached number 10 on the UK Afrobeats Singles Chart and spent several weeks in the top 10 of the Nigeria Apple Music chart. He also produced "Celebrate Me" by Patoranking where he received the award for Producer of the Year from the Under 30 CEO Platform Awards. In 2022, Willis produced "Mufasa" by Tekno, "Traboski" by BNXN, and "Astalavista" by Zlatan and Young Jonn. He also co-produced "Buga" by Kizz Daniel featuring Tekno. In June 2022, He unveiled his record label, Royals Music. In 2023, Willis co-wrote and produced "Legends Can Never Die" by Davido, from Davido's album Timeless. In 2024, He produced "Big Big Things" by Bnxn featuring Kizz Daniel & Seyi Vibez which won him Afropop Producer of the Year at the The Beatz Awards In 2025, he produced Olamide’s "99" with guest verses from Asake, Seyi Vibez, Young Jonn, and British singer Daecolm. which was nominated on the 18th Headies Awards for Best Collaboration

== Awards and nominations ==
Year	Event	Prize	Recipient	Result	Ref
2019	The Beatz Awards	Afro Highlife Producer of the Year	Yung Willis	Nominated	
2019	The Beatz Awards	Afro Hip-hop Producer of the Year	Yung Willis	Nominated	
2021	The Beatz Awards	Afro Hip-hop Producer of the Year	Yung Willis	Won	
2021	Under 30 CEO Platform Awards	Producer of the Year	Yung Willis	Won	
2022	The Beatz Awards	Afrobeats Producer of the Year	Yung Willis	Nominated	
2022	The Beatz Awards	Afrobeats Dancehall Producer of the Year	Yung Willis	Nominated	
2022	The Beatz Awards	Afro Hip-hop Producer of the Year	Yung Willis	Nominated	
2024	The Beatz Awards	Afropop Producer of the Year	Yung Willis	Won	
2024	The Beatz Awards	Afrobeats Dancehall Producer of the Year	Yung Willis	Nominated	

== Production discography ==
Year	Title	Artist	Featured Artist(s)	Ref
2018	"Sweet Boy"	Falz		
2018	"Champagne and Flowers"	Praiz		
2018	"Shomolele"	Praiz	Dapo	
2019	"Talk"	Falz		
2019	"Yaji"	Yemi Alade	Slimcase, Brainee	
2019	"Feel Good"	Ice Prince	Phyno, Falz	
2019	"The Bag"	Phyno		
2019	"Shako"	Shody (The Turnup King)	Joeboy, Yung Willis	
2019	"Yeba"	Yemi Alade		
2019	"Somto"	Yemi Alade		
2019	"Body"	Phyno	Harmonize	
2019	"Loving"	Falz		
2019	"Vacancy"	Ycee		
2019	"Win"	Timaya	Falz	
2019	"Rock Your Body"	Ajebutter	Falz, BOJ	
2020	"Medicine"	Tobi Grey	Yung Willis	
2020	"Born To Win"	Timaya		
2020	"Squander"	Falz	Niniola	
2020	"Highway"	DJ Kaywise	Phyno	
2021	"Baby"	Niniola		
2021	"O Pari"	DJ Shawn	Falz	
2021	"(Loose Guard) I See, I Saw"	Styles	Falz	
2021	"Squander Remix"	Falz	Niniola, Kamo Mphela, Mpura	
2021	"Celebrate Me"	Patoranking		
2021	"Gaza"	DJ Neptune	Patoranking	
2021	"One Life"	Zlatan		
2021	"Waka Waka"	Zoro		
2021	"Cold Outside"	Timaya	Bnxn	
2022	"Body Language"	Falz	Ajebo Hustlers	
2022	"Nobody Else"	Tome		
2022	"Ice Cream"	Falz	Bnxn	
2022	"Gentleman"	Falz		
2022	"Mufasa"	Tekno		
2022	"Vibes"	Waje	Falz	
2022	"Buga"	Kizz Daniel	Tekno	
2022	"Full Current (That's my baby)"	Phyno	Tekno	
2022	"Kolo Kolo"	Patoranking	Diamond Platnumz	
2022	"BBO"	Phyno		
2022	"Traboski"	Bnxn		
2022	"Astalavista"	Zlatan	Young Jonn	
2023	"Legends Can Never Die"	Davido		
2024	"Big Big Things"	Young Jonn	Kizz Daniel & Seyi Vibez	
2024	"Head Start"	Bloody Civilian		
2025	"99"	Olamide	Asake, Young Jonn, Seyi Vibez & Daecolm	
2025	"The Eagle Has Landed"	Flavour		
2025	"Jidenna"	Flavour		
2025	"No Pressure"	Tklex & Yung Willis		
2025	"Money"	JESSIE	Yung Willis	
2026	"Dance for Jesus"	Fido	ODUMODUBLVCK & Zlatan	
2026	"High Class"	Ice Prince	Niniola	
2026	"Press Button"	Tekno		
2026	"Shake That"	Patoranking	Ruger	
