= Hola Hola (Sugarboy song) =

2016 single by Sugarboy

Single by Sugarboy

from the album Believe
- Released: 16 January 2016
- Recorded: 2015
- Genre: Afropop; reggae
- Length: 3:42
- Label: G-Worldwide Entertainment
- Songwriter: Umaren Akanimoh Felix
- Producer: Beatburx

Sugarboy singles chronology
| "Molue" (2015) | "Hola Hola" (2016) | "Double" (2016) |

Music video
- "Hola Hola" on YouTube

Hola Hola is a song by Nigerian reggae-dancehall singer Sugarboy, released on 16 January 2016. Characterized as a mid-tempo afrobeat reggae tune by Information Nigeria,, the song peaked at number 9 on the Playdata #RadioTopTen chart, during the week of 13 June 2016. The music video, was directed by Aje Filmworks, and features cameos from DJ Shabsy, and Kiss Daniel. It debuted on MTV Base Nigeria.

== Background ==
After signing with G-Worldwide in 2015, Sugarboy had his first major breakthrough on DJ Shabsy's song "Raba" with Kiss Daniel in July 2015. The following year, he released "Hola Hola" on 16 January 2016, as the lead single off his debut album Believe (2017), through G-Worldwide Entertainment, as his first single since he signed with the label.

In 2021, "Hola Hola" was on the soundtrack list of Suga Suga, a romantic comedy film by G-Worldwide Entertainment.

== Commercial performance ==
The song peaked at number 7 on the Nigeria Playdata charts during its debut week. Subsequently, it spent 2 consecutive weeks at number nine. On 22 May 2016, Playdata tracked 170 airplay for the week on Nigerian radio.

== Accolades ==
| Year | Organization | Award | Recipient | Result | Ref. |
|---|---|---|---|---|---|
| 2016 | African Entertainment Legend Awards | Hit Song of the Year | "Hola Hola" | Nominated | |
| 2016 | The Beatz Awards | Best Afro Pop Producer | Beatburx for "Hola Hola" | Nominated | |

== Charts ==
=== Weekly charts ===
Weekly performance for "Hola Hola"
| Chart (2016) | Peak position |
|---|---|
| Nigeria (Playdata charts) | 7 |

=== Year-end charts ===
Year-end chart performance for "Hola Hola"
| Chart (2016) | Peak position |
|---|---|
| Hottest Naija Tracks (MTV Base) | 8 |

== Release history ==
| Region | Date | Format | Label |
|---|---|---|---|
| Various | 16 January 2016 | Digital download; streaming | G-Worldwide Entertainment |
