= Mufasa (song) =

Single by Tekno
- Released: 23 February 2022
- Genre: Afropop
- Length: 2:58
- Label: PWRS; Cartel
- Songwriter: Augustine Miles Kelechi
- Producer: Yung Willis

Tekno singles chronology
"Don't Hit My Line" (2021)	"Mufasa" (2022)	"Buga" (2022)

Music video
- "Mufasa" on YouTube

Mufasa is a song recorded by Nigerian singer-songwriter Tekno, it was released on 23 February 2022, by PWRS and Cartel Entertainment. It was written by Tekno and produced by Yung Willis.

The song received mostly positive reviews from music critics and topped the Apple Music top 100 charts in Nigeria, and debuted at 23 on the TurnTable Top 50 chart.

== Background and reception ==
Tekno returned after dropping his debut album Old Romance to announce the release of Mufasa. The song is characterised as an Afropop song with elements of R&B. The music video was released this same day, on the 23 February 2022. OkayAfrica described the style of "Mufasa" as it being "on the elements he typically masters, afro-fusion percussion, light synths and a strong vocal delivery."

== Commercial performance ==
Its video debuted on Soundcity's Naija Top 20, and also on MTV Base's Official Naija Top 10. It peak at 23 on TurnTable Top 50 chart and spent one week. OkayAfrica included it on their lost of the Best Nigerian Songs of the Month (February).

== Release history ==
Region	Date	Format	Label	Ref.
Various	23 February 2022	Digital download; streaming	PWRS; Cartel	
