= Fada Fada =

"Fada Fada (Ghetto Gospel)"

Single by Phyno featuring Olamide

from the album The Playmaker
- Released: 5 May 2016
- Genre: Afrobeats; highlife; gospel
- Length: 4:48
- Label: Penthauze
- Songwriters: Chibuzor Azubuike; Olamide Adedeji
- Producer: Masterkraft

Phyno singles chronology
"Show Love" (2016)	"Fada Fada (Ghetto Gospel)" (2016)	"I Still Want My Girl (Ashawo Remix)" (2016)

Olamide singles chronology
"Who You Epp?" (2016)	"Fada Fada (Ghetto Gospel)" (2016)	"Under the Blanket (Remix)" (2016)

Music video
- "Fada Fada" on YouTube

"Fada Fada (Ghetto Gospel)", more commonly known as "Fada Fada", is a song by Nigerian rapper Phyno featuring fellow Nigerian rapper Olamide. It was released on 5 May 2016, as the third single from the former's second studio album The Playmaker (2016). Produced by Masterkraft, the song won Collaboration of the Year and Song of the Year at the 2016 tooXclusive Awards and the eleventh edition of The Headies respectively. It received a nomination for Best Pop Single at the Headies as well. In 2016, "Fada Fada” was ranked number one on MTV Base's Roundtable poll of industry experts, which listed Nigeria's hottest tracks of the year.

== Background ==
On the Soundcity Top 10 Nigeria Countdown, Phyno said that "Fada Fada" was inspired by the gospel music he used to listen to growing up. He admitted the song was recorded in three hours, with Olamide recording his verse and then Phyno recording his after.

== Live performances ==
On 4 January 2018, Phyno and Olamide performed "Fada Fada" together at the 2017 CAF Awards, held at the Accra International Conference Centre in Accra, Ghana.

== Chart performance ==
"Fada Fada" debuted at number 8 on PlayData's #RadioTopTen chart for the week ending 22 May 2016. It climbed to number 7 the following week and reached the number 1 position on the chart for the week ending 12 June 2016, replacing Kiss Daniel's "Mama". The song remained at number 1 for ten consecutive weeks, maintaining its spot as the most played song on Nigerian radio during that period. It faced competition from tracks like Tekno's "Pana", Drake's "Controlla", and Kiss Daniel's "Mama". For the week ending 28 August 2016, "Fada Fada" was displaced from the top position by Tekno's "Pana".

== Reception ==
Osareme Edeoghon of Music in Africa saw "Fada Fada" as a faith-tinged rags-to-riches song that "tried really hard not to sound like ['Connect']," while raising doubts about whether Phyno was drifting too far from rap. Reviewing The Playmaker, Jim Donnett of tooXclusive described the song as a "street anthem" and a "classic record," saying it was what listeners would expect "when two indigenous rap heavyweights collide."

=== Critical rankings and year-end lists ===
"Fada Fada" was ranked number one on MTV Base's Roundtable poll of industry experts, which listed Nigeria's hottest tracks of the year. In August 2025, the song was ranked #20 on Billboard's list of the 50 Best Afrobeats Songs of All Time. Pulse Nigeria featured it in their list of the Top 20 Nigerian Songs of the Year. Encomium Magazine also included the song in their list of the Hottest Songs of 2016. It was among songs like "Pana" by Tekno and "Who You Epp?" by Olamide in tooXclusive's list of 10 Music Hits Thus Far.

== Accolades ==
Awards and nominations for "Fada Fada"
Organization	Year	Category	Result	Ref.
All Africa Music Awards	2016	African Fans Favorite	Nominated	
The Headies	2016	Song of the Year	Won	
The Headies	2016	Best Pop Single	Nominated	
Nigerian Music Video Awards	2016	Best Highlife Video	Nominated	
Nigerian Music Video Awards	2016	Video of the Year	Nominated	
Soundcity MVP Awards Festival	2016	Best Collaboration	Won	
tooXclusive Awards	2017	Collaboration of the Year	Won	
Nigeria Entertainment Awards	2017	Hottest Single of the Year	Nominated	
COSON Song Awards	2017	Best Dance Song	Nominated	
COSON Song Awards	2017	Best Collabo Song	Nominated	
COSON Song Awards	2017	Song of Songs	Nominated	
Ghana-Naija Showbiz Awards	2017	Song of the Year	Nominated	
