= African Giant =

Studio album by Burna Boy
- Released: July 26, 2019
- Recorded: 2018–19
- Genres: Afrobeats; Afrobeat; dancehall; pop; hip hop
- Length: 60:00
- Languages: English; Nigerian Pidgin; Yoruba; Igbo
- Labels: Bad Habit; Spaceship; Atlantic; Warner Music
- Producers: Kel-P; P2J; Benjamz; Mr Kleb; DJDS; Dre Skull; Skrillex; GMK; Chopstix; TMXO; Levi Lennox; IO

Burna Boy chronology
Steel & Copper (2019)	African Giant (2019)	Twice as Tall (2020)

Singles from African Giant
- 1. "Gbona" Released: September 27, 2018; 2. "On the Low" Released: November 16, 2018; 3. "Killin Dem" Released: January 3, 2019; 4. "Dangote" Released: March 1, 2019; 5. "Anybody" Released: June 14, 2019; 6. "Pull Up" Released: July 22, 2019; 7. "Omo" Released: November 6, 2019; 8. "Secret" Released: January 24, 2020

African Giant is the fourth studio album by Nigerian singer Burna Boy, released on July 26, 2019, via Spaceship Entertainment, Bad Habit, Atlantic Records and Warner Music. The album is a mixture of Afrobeats, Afrobeat, dancehall, pop and hip hop. It was produced primarily by Kel-P, along with production from Benjamz, Dre Skull and Skrillex, among others. The album features guest appearances from Jorja Smith, Jeremih, Damian Marley, Zlatan Ibile, Angelique Kidjo, Serani, M.anifest, YG and Future. It was supported by eight singles, including "On the Low", which won Viewers' Choice at the 2020 Soundcity MVP Awards Festival, "Killin Dem", which won Song of the Year at the 2020 Soundcity MVP Awards Festival, among other awards; and "Anybody", which Burna Boy performed on Jimmy Kimmel Live!.

The album received generally favorable reviews from music critics, who called it cohesive and praised Burna Boy for not diluting his sound. It was included in the year-end lists issued by several publications, including Billboard, Complex and Pitchfork. African Giant won Album of the Year at the 2019 All Africa Music Awards and was nominated for Best World Music Album at the 62nd Annual Grammy Awards. It was supported by the African Giant Returns tour, which commenced in Toronto in August 2019.

== Background and recording ==
Burna Boy recorded songs for African Giant with Kel-P between August and November 2018. The latter told Revolt TV that he met the singer through a mutual friend in August. He said that they spent six weeks in a Lagos hotel room recording 23 songs for the album. The M.anifest-assisted track "Another Story" was recorded at a hotel in Ghana. The tracks "On the Low", "Gbona", "Omo", and "Spiritual" were all recorded on the same day. Burna Boy told Billboard magazine the album is his most personal yet, and would touch upon themes of Nigeria's political climate and violence in the region. The album was produced primarily by Kel P, along with production from Benjamz, Dre Skulls and Skrillex, among others. It features contributions with Jorja Smith, Jeremih, Damian Marley, Zlatan Ibile, Angelique Kidjo, Serani, M.anifest, YG and Future. African Giant was mixed in Los Angeles and London by Jesse Ray Ernster, a mixing engineer known for his collaboration with Kanye West.

The album's title was derived from Burna Boy's infamous outburst at Coachella's organizers regarding the placement of his name in a small font. Burna Boy held a private listening session for the album in Los Angeles. Photos and videos from the listening session were shared on social media. African Giant was initially announced as a 16-track album to be released in August 2019. In July 2019, Burna Boy was disclosed as Apple Music's Up Next artist. His inclusion into the program was accompanied by a Beats 1 interview with Julie Adenuga and a short documentary. In the same month, Burna Boy unveiled the album's artwork and release date. The artwork was inspired by Nigeria's first 10 naira note, which features Nigerian educationist Alvan Ikoku. The album's artwork also contains other symbolic elements, including serial style numbers representing his date of birth, images of him as a baby with his father and grandfather depicting generational transition, and a stack of gold coins suggesting a single African currency backed by gold.

== Composition ==
African Giant is an Afrobeats, Afrobeat, dancehall, pop and hip hop album. On the album's opener and title track "African Giant", Burna Boy portrays himself as the poster boy in the fight against oppression. "Anybody" contains a sample of Angelique Kidjo's "We We". Pitchfork writer Alphonse Pierre praised the song's melody and said Burna Boy's best attribute is his vocal versatility. The track "Wetin Man Go Do" addresses Nigeria's inner-city struggles. "Dangote", a track recorded in Yoruba, Nigerian pidgin and English, is composed of Fela-jazz horns and African-inflected dancehall; its lyrics stress the importance for ordinary people to hustle. The song is named after Africa's richest man Aliko Dangote and is an angry indictment of poverty in Nigeria.

"Gum Body", a duet with British singer Jorja Smith, is a love ballad that fuses Afrobeats and R&B. The song's instrumental is composed of percussion and sensual jazz sax. The Zlatan-assisted track "Killin Dem" is a blend of Burna Boy's Afro-fusion and Zlatan's cock-sure rap bars. The dancehall and reggae-infused "Omo" interpolates I Wayne's "Can't Satisfy Her"; the track has been described as "a love letter" to his then-girlfriend Stefflon Don. "Collateral Damage", a song about the corruption within Africa, features a guitar-assisted instrumental. The politically charged track "Another Story" narrates the corruption of British colonization. "Pull Up" is composed of scattered strings and percussion. Musically, it contains lyrics about a man's interest in a girl he cannot stop thinking about. In "Different", Burna Boy rhymes about the perils of democracy; the song features vocals by Damian Marley and Angélique Kidjo.

"Gbona" (Yoruba: Hot) was produced by Kel P and is a fusion of Afrobeats and reggae. It was recorded in Nigerian pidgin, Yoruba and Igbo. In a review for Pan African Music, Wale Owoade praised the song's production and said it "thrives on the harmonious fusion of a static sound of the past with an infectious dance vibe from the present". "On the Low" is a mixture of Afrobeats and dancehall; in it, Burna Boy talks about a secret affair that he wants to turn into a lifelong commitment. The song was produced by Kel P and has been described as a mid-tempo love song. Lindsay Howard of Variance magazine said the song is "instantly reminiscent of long days and hot nights". The Future-assisted track "Show & Tell" blends contemporary beats and has a dancehall rhythm. On the album's closing track "Spiritual", Burna Boy samples his mother's acceptance speech at the 2019 BET Awards.

== Release and promotion ==
In April 2019, Burna Boy embarked on the African Giant tour, stopping in several U.S. cities and performing at Coachella Valley Music and Arts Festival in California and the Apollo Theater in Harlem, New York City. In July 2019, he announced he would embark on the African Giant Returns tour to support the album. This tour featured live concerts across Canada, the United States, Belgium, the Netherlands, and the United Kingdom. The African Giant Returns tour was scheduled to begin on Friday, August 9, at the Rebel concert venue in Toronto. However, the Rebel gig was cancelled at the last minute and rescheduled for the following Sunday. Writing for Now newspaper, Sumiko Wilson gave the gig a positive review, praising Burna Boy's performance and saying he had "traces of Fela Kuti's signature electric stage presence". Aniefiok Ekpoudom of The Guardian gave a five out of five-star review of the concert at the Wembley Arena in London, writing it "has the feeling of a coronation of Nigeria's latest musical king".

On September 10, 2019, Burna Boy released the music video for "Gum Body", a duet with British singer Jorja Smith. In the Meji Alabi-directed visuals, the duo are placed in different rooms in an unlit apartment before coming together to dance near a window. Burna Boy released the music video for the M.anifest-assisted track, "Another Story", on September 30, 2019. The video was released a day before Nigeria's independence day and recounts the events surrounding the country's freedom from British rule. In the video, children are wearing blindfolds with the words "corruption", "violence" and "greed" written across them. Another scene in the video depicts children raising weapons and a crowd destroying a burning car.

== Singles ==
"Gbona" was released as the album's lead single on September 27, 2018. The Clarence Peters-directed music video for "Gbona" features Kalukata-influenced female dancers. The album's second single, "On the Low", was released on November 16, 2018. Burna Boy won Viewers' Choice award for "On the Low" at the 2020 Soundcity MVP Awards Festival. "On the Low" received 15 million streams in France and was awarded a gold plaque by the National Syndicate of Phonographic Publishing (SNEP). The accompanying music video for "On the Low" was shot and directed by Meji Alabi.

The Zlatan-assisted track "Killin Dem" was released on January 3, 2019, as the album's third single. The Prodigeezy-directed music video for "Killin Dem" incorporates clips from a Zubby Michael Nollywood film and features a mixture of Zanku dance styles. Burna Boy won Best Collaboration for "Killin' Dem" at The Headies 2019. He was also nominated for Best Collaboration and won Song of the Year for "Killin Den" at the 2019 African Muzik Magazine Awards. Moreover, he won Song of the Year and was nominated for Best Collaboration and Listeners' Choice for "Killin Dem" at the 2020 Soundcity MVP Awards Festival.

"Dangote" was released as the album's fourth single on March 1, 2019. The music video for "Dangote" was shot and directed by Clarence Peters; it depicts the desperation of the poor and their oppression. During it, viewers can see an unlicensed pharmacist selling drugs in a public vehicle and a preacher passing around a plate for donations. The New Afrika Shrine is also depicted in the video.

The album's fifth single, "Anybody", was released on June 14, 2019. As part of Apple Music's Up Next programming, Burna Boy performed the song on Jimmy Kimmel Live!. A music video directed by Clarence Peters accompanied the song's release. The video features various neon hues and dancers in numerous wardrobes. The Kel P-produced track "Pull Up" was released on July 22, 2019, as the album's sixth single. Burna Boy premiered the song on Zane Lowe's Beats 1 radio show. On August 21, 2019, the music video for the Meji Alabi-directed "Pull Up" was released. In it, Burna Boy displays his vintage aesthetic fashion style.

The album's seventh single, "Omo", was released on November 6, 2019, along with its music video. The video for "Omo" was directed by Clarence Peters and begins with a shot of Burna Boy sitting on a chair inside a strip club, with the words Giant Club highlighted in neon. The album's eighth single "Secret", a track that features American singer Jeremih and Jamaican dancehall artist Serani, was released on January 24, 2020. The David Camarena-directed video for the song was shot in various dimly lit, monochromatic settings.

== Reception ==
Professional ratings
Aggregate scores
Source	Rating
Metacritic	80/100
Review scores
Source	Rating
Pulse Nigeria	9.1/10
Pitchfork	8.3/10
Clash	7/10
Earmilk	4.5/5 stars
The Face	4/5 stars
NME	4/5 stars
The Observer	4/5 stars
The Guardian	3/5 stars

African Giant received positive reviews from music critics. At Metacritic, which assigns a normalized rating out of 100 to reviews from mainstream publications, the album received an average score of 80, based on six reviews. Motolani Alake of Pulse Nigeria assigned a rating of 9.1 out of 10, praising the album's emotive undertone and stating that there is "a uniform sonic approach to all the beats". Alake said African Giant is the "perfection of the journey that Outside pioneered". Sheldon Pearce of Pitchfork rated the record 8.3 out of 10, saying it is "more cohesive, more robust in sound, and significantly broader than his previous music". Clash magazine's Narzra Ahmed granted the album seven out of ten, describing it as "a cohesive piece of work". Spin's Israel Daramola commended Burna Boy for not diluting his sound in order to cross into the mainstream.

Kyann-Sian Williams of NME awarded the album four stars out of five, applauding Burna Boy for "using his profile to raise awareness for a better Africa". Kitty Empire of The Observer rated the album four stars out of five, characterizing it as a continuation of "the singer's boundary-hopping mixture of laid-back Caribbean swagger, Fela Kuti swing and multilingual communiques on a range of concerns". Also reviewing for The Guardian, Ben Beaumont-Thomas said the album's "retro Afro-pop production can get generic though, when repeated across 19 tracks" and that Burna Boy's "sensual, even rather muted music, may make it hard for him to cut through the noise of western pop culture". Writing for The Fader magazine, Joey Akan said African Giant is "Nigeria's biggest homegrown effort with a solid measure of local ownership and a narrative that isn't sacrificed or weakened as a prerequisite for global appeal."

Jochan Embley of the Evening Standard felt the album would be Burna Boy's best work yet if it was more "concise". The Atlantic writer Hannah Giorgis described African Giant as a "musically diverse and narratively challenging" project that "incorporates a potent emphasis on national record-keeping while maintaining the sultry, atmospheric quality that Burna's early records established". August Brown of the Los Angeles Times wrote that the album "never dilutes its sound to cater to Anglo audiences, or even to the hip-hop and R&B scenes that are dabbling in Afro-pop right now." The Face's Summer Eldemire gave the album four stars out of five, saying it feels "political–like a blueprint of Burna's plan to enable Africans to access their own power and uplift the continent." In a review for The Washington Post, Chris Richards stated that on African Giant, Burna Boy's "phrasing always feels fleet, creating a sound that's incredibly dense and impossibly dainty". Richards also said Burna Boy uses his voice to "give his heaviest lyrics a sense of levity and optimism".

A writer for Filter Free Nigeria, who goes by the moniker the Waistbead Whisperer, said Burna Boy "drew on the positives from Outside while honing the album" and that the "production aligns perfectly to his Afrocentric posture of superiority as it even emboldens even the foreign artistes to ride his wave". In a review for This Day newspaper, Iyke Bede said the record "manages to chronicle a narrative of identity, ambition, activism and love". In contrast, Bede also notes African Giant "certainly isn't aptly titled to reflect Burna's rightful place alongside the galaxy of music stars (King Sunny Adé, Osita Osadebe) that have emerged from the black continent". African Giant won Album of the Year at the 2019 All Africa Music Awards and was nominated for Best World Music Album at the 62nd Annual Grammy Awards. It was also nominated for Album of the Year at The Headies 2020.

=== Year-end and all time rankings ===
Publication	Accolade	Rank	Ref.
Complex	The Best Albums of 2019	13	
Billboard	The 50 Best Albums of 2019	14	
Pitchfork	The 50 Best Albums of 2019	26	
Vice	The 100 Best Albums of 2019	12	
Vice	The 100 Best Albums of the 2010s	63	
Rolling Stone	The 50 Best Albums of 2019	46	
Rolling Stone	Rolling Stone 500 greatest album	330	
The Atlantic	The 18 Best Albums of 2019	—	

== Track listing ==
No.	Title	Writer(s)	Producer(s)	Length
1.	"African Giant"	Damini Ogulu	Kel-P; Benjamz	3:04
2.	"Anybody"	Ogulu	P2J	3:08
3.	"Wetin Man Go Do"	Ogulu	Kel-P	3:08
4.	"Dangote"	Ogulu	Kel-P	3:45
5.	"Gum Body" (featuring Jorja Smith)	Ogulu; Jorja Smith	Benjamz	3:15
6.	"Killin Dem" (with Zlatan)	Ogulu; Omoniyi Raphael	Kel-P	3:41
7.	"Omo"	Ogulu	Mr Kleb	2:27
8.	"Secret" (featuring Jeremih and Serani)	Ogulu; Jeremy Felton; Craig Marsh	Tboythe1	3:23
9.	"Collateral Damage"	Ogulu	Kel-P	3:17
10.	"Another Story" (featuring M.anifest)	Ogulu; Kwame Tsikata	Kel-P	4:16
11.	"Pull Up"	Ogulu	Kel-P	3:07
12.	"Blak Ryno (Skit)"	—	—	1:06
13.	"Destiny"	Ogulu	DJDS	3:17
14.	"Different" (featuring Damian Marley and Angélique Kidjo)	Ogulu; Damian "Jr. Gong" Marley; Angélique Kidjo	GMK; Chopstix; TMXO	3:16
15.	"Gbona"	Ogulu	Kel-P	3:07
16.	"On the Low"	Ogulu	Kel-P	3:05
17.	"Show & Tell" (featuring Future)	Ogulu; Nayvadius Wilburn	Dre Skull; Skrillex	2:42
18.	"This Side" (featuring YG)	Ogulu; Keenon Jackson	Levi Lennox; IO	3:22
19.	"Spiritual"	Ogulu	Kel-P	3:41
Total length:				60:00

Notes

- "—" denotes a skit
- "Anybody" contains a sample of Angelique Kidjo's "We We" (1992).
- "Omo" interpolates I Wayne's "Can't Satisfy Her" (2004).

== Personnel ==
- Damini Ogulu – primary artist, writer
- Omoniyi Raphael – featured artist, writer
- Jorja Alice Smith – featured artist, writer
- Jeremy P. Felton – featured artist, writer
- Craig Serani Marsh – featured artist, writer
- Kwame Ametepee Tsikata – featured artist, writer
- Damian "Jr. Gong" Marley – featured artist, writer
- Angélique Kidjo – featured artist, writer
- Nayvadius DeMun Wilburn – featured artist, writer
- Keenon Jackson – featured artist, writer
- Kel-P – production (tracks 1, 3, 4, 6, 9, 10, 11, 15, 16, 19)
- Peter Jay – production (track 2)
- Benjamz – production (tracks 1, 5)
- Mr Kleb – production (track 7)
- DJDS – production (track 13)
- GMK – production (track 14)
- Chopstix – production (track 14)
- TMXO – production (track 14)
- Dre Skull – production (track 17)
- Skrillex – production (track 17)
- Levi Lennox – production (track 18)
- IO – production (track 18)
- Jesse Ray Ernster – mixing
- Joseph Brice – Assistant Engineer
- Aran Knight – Assistant Engineer
- Harpaal Sanghera – Assistant Engineer
- Joshua "J.D." Walker – Engineer

== Charts ==
=== Weekly charts ===
Chart (2019)	Peak position
Belgian Albums (Ultratop Flanders)	58
Belgian Albums (Ultratop Wallonia)	98
Canadian Albums (Billboard)	33
Dutch Albums (Album Top 100)	12
French Albums (SNEP)	54
Irish Albums (IRMA)	80
Swiss Albums (Schweizer Hitparade)	64
UK Albums (Official Charts)	16
US Billboard 200	104
Chart (2022)	Position
Nigeria Top 50 Albums (TurnTable)	40

=== Year-end charts ===
Chart (2019)	Position
Dutch Albums (Album Top 100)	70
Chart (2020)	Position
Dutch Albums (Album Top 100)	42
French Albums (SNEP)	168
Chart (2021)	Position
Dutch Albums (Album Top 100)	95
Chart (2022)	Position
Dutch Albums (Album Top 100)	75

== Certifications ==
Certifications for African Giant
Region	Certification	Certified units/sales
Canada (Music Canada)	Gold	40,000^{‡}
Denmark (IFPI Danmark)	Gold	10,000^{‡}
France (SNEP)	Platinum	100,000^{‡}
Netherlands (NVPI)	Gold	20,000^{‡}
Sweden (GLF)	Gold	15,000^{‡}
Switzerland (IFPI Switzerland)	Gold	10,000^{‡}
United Kingdom (BPI)	Gold	100,000^{‡}
^{‡} Sales+streaming figures based on certification alone.

== Release history ==
Region	Date	Format	Label	Ref
Various	July 26, 2019	CD; vinyl; digital download; streaming	Bad Habit; Spaceship; Atlantic; Warner Music	
