= The Playmaker (album) =

Studio album by Phyno
- Released: 1 November 2016
- Genres: Afrobeats; Igbo rap; hip hop
- Length: 85:25
- Languages: Igbo; Nigerian Pidgin
- Label: Penthauze
- Producers: Del B; Masterkraft; Chris Stringz; TSpize; Major Bangz; Tunex; Kezyklef; Benjamz

Phyno chronology
2 Kings (2015)	The Playmaker (2016)	Deal with It (2019)

Singles from the Playmaker
- 1. "Connect" Released: 6 October 2015; 2. "Ezege" Released: 26 January 2016; 3. "Fada Fada" Released: 5 May 2016; 4. "E Sure For Me" Released: 7 July 2016; 5. "Pino Pino" Released: 9 October 2016

The Playmaker is the second studio album by Nigerian rapper Phyno, released on 1 November 2016 by Penthauze Music. Predominantly recorded in Igbo and Nigerian Pidgin, the album features guest appearances from M.I, Flavour, Onyeka Onwenu, Tidinz, Mr Eazi, Olamide, DeCarlo, 2Baba, Burna Boy, P-Square, and Zoro. Production was handled by Del B, Masterkraft, Major Bangz, Benjamz, Tunex, Chris Stringz, TSpize, and Kezyklef. The Playmaker was supported the singles "Connect", "Ezege", "Fada Fada", "E Sure for Me", and "Pino Pino". It is a follow-up to 2 Kings (2015).

== Singles ==
The album's lead single, "Connect", was released on 6 October 2015 and was produced by TSpize. The second single, "Ezege", was released on 26 January 2016 and was produced by Del B. The third single, "Fada Fada" features Olamide and was produced by Masterkraft. It was released on 5 May 2016, won Song of the Year, and was nominated for Best Pop Single at the 2016 edition of The Headies. At the ceremony, Masterkraft earned a nomination for Producer of the Year for "Fada Fada". The fourth single, "E Sure for Me" was released on 7 July 2016 and was produced by Kezyklef. The fifth single, "Pino Pino" was released on 9 October 2016 and produced by Benjamz.

== Critical reception ==
The Playmaker received generally positive reviews from critics. Joey Akan of Pulse Nigeria rated the album a 4 out of 5, praising it for being "complete and consistent all through the album, giving the listener a holistic experience of the new Phyno as a man, an artiste and an industry leader", and called it a "confirmation of his present status". Wilfred Okiche of 360nobs said that The Playmaker was "big, sprawling, glossy, messy but ultimately worthwhile outing."

Jim Donnett of tooXclusive rated the Playmaker by Phyno 4 out of 5, saying it was "a star-spangled work that doesn't only beam meritoriously on the rapper, [but] also illuminates his association in a galaxy where his producers' efforts in defying a local boy's template sounds are allowed to shine independently". Chiagoziem Onyekwena of Filter Free said that the album was "musically diverse" and rated it 7.8/10.

=== Accolades ===
Year	Awards ceremony	Award description(s)	Results	Ref.
2017	Ghana-Naija Showbiz Awards	Album of the Year	Nominated	
2017	Nigeria Entertainment Awards	Best Album	Nominated	
2018	The Headies	Best Rap Album	Nominated	
2018	The Headies	Album of the Year	Won	

== Track listing ==
The Playmaker track listing
No.	Title	Writer(s)	Producer(s)	Length
1.	"Yes, I Pray (Nwa Oge Nta)"	Chibuzo Azubuike	Tunex	3:42
2.	"Abulo"	Azubuike	Major Bangz	4:14
3.	"Financial Woman" (featuring P-Square)	Azubuike; Peter Okoye; Paul Okoye	Chris Stringz	4:14
4.	"Ino Nma"	Azubuike	Major Bangz	4:42
5.	"Best Rapper"	Azubuike	Major Bangz	4:38
6.	"E Sure For Me"	Azubuike	Kezyklef	3:35
7.	"Link Up" (featuring M.I and Burna Boy)	Azubuike; Jude Abaga; Damini Ogulu	Masterkraft	3:38
8.	"Pino Pino"	Azubuike	Benjamz	4:49
9.	"Okpeke" (featuring 2Baba and Flavour)	Azubuike; Innocent Idibia; Chinedu Okoli	Major Bangz	4:40
10.	"Obiagu"	Azubuike	Masterkraft	4:09
11.	"Joy Comes in the Morning"	Azubuike	Major Bangz	4:06
12.	"SFSG (So Far So Good)"	Azubuike	Masterkraft	4:20
13.	"I'm a Fan" (featuring DeCarlo and Mr Eazi)	Azubuike; Terence Coles; Oluwatosin Ajibade	Benjamz	3:09
14.	"Mistakes"	Azubuike	Benjamz	4:18
15.	"Ochie Dike (Mama)" (featuring Onyeka Onwenu)	Azubuike; Onyeka Onwenu	Masterkraft	5:06
16.	"Fada Fada" (featuring Olamide)	Azubuike; Olamide Adedeji	Masterkraft	4:48
17.	"Mkpotu" (featuring Zoro and Tidinz)	Azubuike; Owoh Chrismathner; Dilichukwu Okonkwo	Tunex	4:05
18.	"Ezege"	Azubuike	Del B	4:40
19.	"No Be My Style" (featuring Burna Boy)	Azubuike; Ogulu	TSpize	4:21
20.	"Connect"	Azubuike	TSpize	4:26
Total length:				84:00

== Personnel ==
Credits adapted from Premium Times.

- TSpize - production
- Del B – production
- Benjamz – production
- Masterkraft – production
- Tunex – production
- Chris Stringz – production
- Kezyklef – production
- Major Bangz – production
- Xtraordinaire – mixing, mastering
- Harcourt Whyte - vocal sample
- Oriental Brothers - guitar sample
- Soularge - live guitars
- Paul Ukonu - photography
- Kenepisode - stylist
- Abinibi - album art
- Waga G - additional vocals
- Clarence Peters – video director
- Patrick Elis – video director

== Release history ==
Release history and formats for The Playmaker
Region	Date	Format	Label
Nigeria	1 November 2016	CD; digital download	Penthauze
