= On the Low (Burna Boy song) =

Single by Burna Boy

from the album African Giant
- Released: 16 November 2018
- Genre: Afrobeats
- Length: 3:05
- Label: Bad Habit; Spaceship; Atlantic; Warner
- Songwriters: Damini Ebunoluwa Ogulu; Peter Kelvin Amba Udoma; Piriye Isokrari
- Producer: Kel-P

Burna Boy singles chronology
"Ye" (2018)	"On the Low" (2018)	"Killin Dem" (2019)

Music video
- "On The Low" on YouTube

"On the Low" is a song by Nigerian singer and songwriter Burna Boy. It was released on 16 November 2018, as the second single from his fourth studio album, African Giant. The song was produced by Nigerian record producer Kel-P.

== Music video ==
The official music video for "On The Low" premiered alongside the release of the song on 16 November 2018. Directed by Meji Alabi, it uses long, sweeping shots to tell a love story, adding a visual narrative to the song.

== Charts ==
Chart (2018–2022)	Peak position
France (SNEP)	78
Netherlands (Single Top 100)	97
US Afrobeats Songs (Billboard)	21
US World Digital Song Sales (Billboard)	20

== Certifications ==
Certifications for "On the Low"
Region	Certification	Certified units/sales
Australia (ARIA)	Gold	35,000^{‡}
Canada (Music Canada)	2× Platinum	160,000^{‡}
Denmark (IFPI Danmark)	Gold	45,000^{‡}
France (SNEP)	Diamond	333,333^{‡}
New Zealand (RMNZ)	Platinum	30,000^{‡}
Nigeria (TCSN)	Silver	25,000^{‡}
Switzerland (IFPI Switzerland)	Platinum	20,000^{‡}
United Kingdom (BPI)	Platinum	600,000^{‡}
United States (RIAA)	Gold	500,000^{‡}
Streaming
Sweden (GLF)	Platinum	8,000,000^{†}
^{‡} Sales+streaming figures based on certification alone.^{†} Streaming-only figures based on certification alone.

== Release history ==
Release history and formats for "On the Low"
Country	Date	Format	Label	Ref.
Various	16 November 2018	Digital download; streaming	Bad Habit; Spaceship; Atlantic; Warner Music	
