= Moroccan Philharmonic Orchestra =

The Moroccan Philharmonic Orchestra (French: Orchestre Philharmonique du Maroc) is Morocco's national symphony orchestra, which was established in August 1996.
