= Malick Koly =

Franco-Ivorian drummer and composer

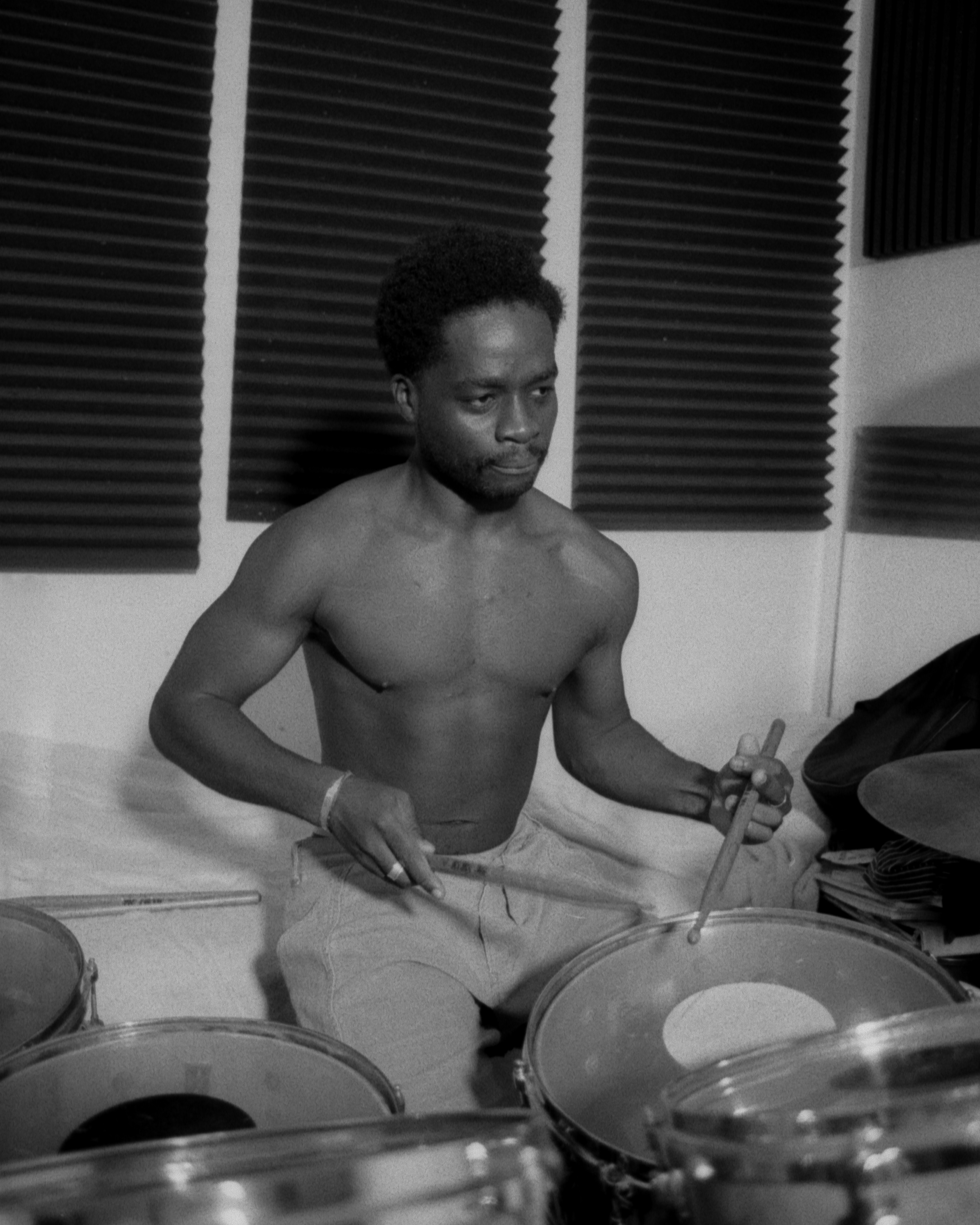

Background information
- Born: March 28th 1998; Abidjan
- Genres: Rock, Folk, Pop
- Instrument: Drums
- Labels: UMA, C2C
- Website: www.papamalickkoly.com

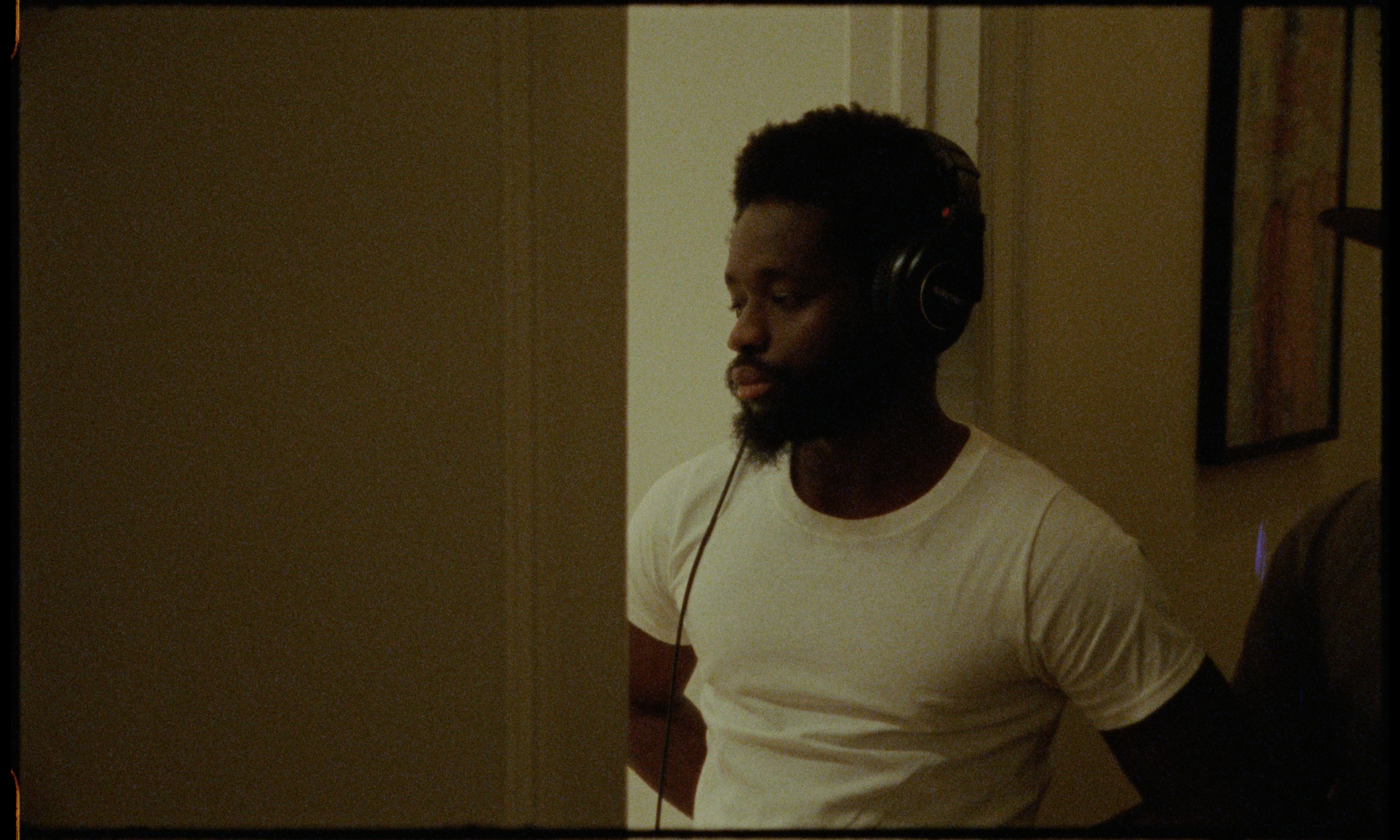
Malick Koly in the studio

Malick Koly is a New York based drummer, singer songwriter emerging from a past as a sideman & notably a mentee of Steve Jordan’s. He is crafting new definitions around what it means to be a multidimensional artist. Koly’s forthcoming alt-rock EP Feel Bad Fest engages legends such as Ron Carter, Steve Jordan his mentor & Vernon Reid and explores the beautiful yet melancholic nature of building a life as a nomad.”

== Biography ==
=== Early life ===
Koly grew up between three different continents, Africa, Europe And North America. He was born in Abidjan and is of Guinean and Malian decent. He began to study music at an early age through his mother the Malian vocalist and World Music Grammy award nominee Awa Sangho and his father Souleymane Koly the Franco-Guinean impresario and playwright. Then later moved to the United States around High School and enrolled as a sideman for notable acts such as, Wallace Roney, Charnett Moffett, Charles Tolliver & many more.

== Discography ==
- Dolòr, released April 7, 2023
- Heaven For Now, May 26th 2023
- Eaux Rouges, June 30, 2023
- Is It Even Hot in LA, July 21, 2023
- Feel Bad Fest EP, August 18, 2023
