= Apex and Bionic =

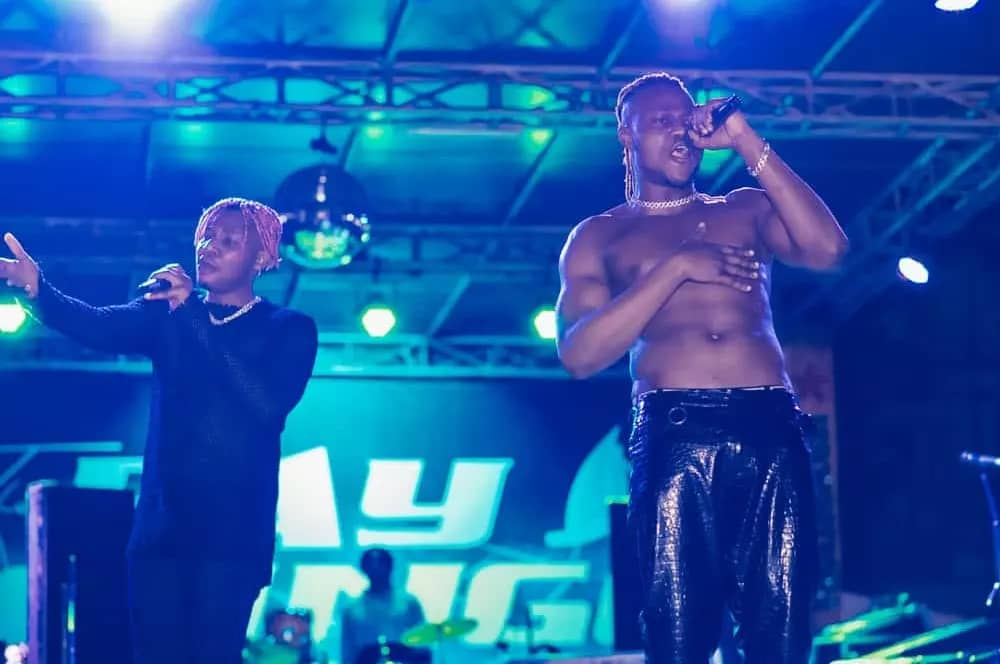

Background information
- Born: Andrew; Daniel Omokhudu; Benin, Nigeria
- Origin: Owan, Edo State, Nigeria
- Genres: R&B, hip hop, Afrobeats
- Occupations: Recording artists, performers, singers, actors
- Instrument: Vocals
- Years active: 2010–present
- Label: JFK Resolute Entertainment

Apex and Bionic are a Nigerian R&B duo of brothers Andrew Omokhudu and Daniel Omokhudu. They released their debut single in 2014 titled Tell Them. In June 2019, they had a collaboration with Tuface titled For Your Matter. They are currently signed to JFK Resolute Entertainment Record Label.

They are also a music figure in Nigeria music industry who has been credited for popularizing the Benin afro sound which made them gain their very first recognition from a major feature on LGTV Commercials when they modelled in 2013.

== Career ==
AB were born and grew up in Benin City, but hail from Owan local government, both in Edo State. They started singing in 2010, but did not release a professional song until 2014, when their debut single Tell Them was released.

Bionic was also a part of a hip hop group called "MOCLAN". He was the leader of this band and his story was said to have dominated all street rap battles in the south from 2007 to 2011. He would rap using strange words and rhymes to create rap verses which was always shocking and unexpected while Apex on the other hand was a fitness model and a rapper but was mostly involved in hosting of events and rap battles alongside friends and they had the "open mic night" up until 2012 .

Growing up in Benin and its environs has been cited as one of their biggest influence since they started singing because it has prevented them from joining bad gangs in the society and most importantly it carved a different niche in the music industry.

In 2015, they released another single called Oshere. The following year 2016, saw the twins release their first album titled Nothing to Something, a ten track album. AB collaborated with Uhuru and Dj Maphorisa to make the song Get Down, one of the tracks listed on the album.

In May 2019, Apex and Bionic released a music video for their song Hold Up. In June 2019, AB and Tuface released a song For Your Matter which was dropped on the Apple iTunes music platform.

On 16 January 2020 Apex and Bionic caused a heavy stir across their social media platform where they posted nudes of different girls.

In November 2020, they announced and released a fresh album and movie titled " Nobody Holy" .This Body of work Features 2face, Davido, OritseFemi Seyi Shay, and SlimCase. As cited by The nation, the album and movie expose the social ills and how difficult it is for an average young African to be upright considering the everyday struggles. On 16 November, they claimed slimcase a Nigerian Musician stole their song “Passmark” while trying to record a single in the same studio they were using. This claim really got the attention of a popular TV station in the country “Hip TV” where they explained every single details of the claim. When this got viral, comedian Ayo Makun reached out to both parties to make amend which worked out with his influence.

== Discography ==
=== Studio albums ===
- 2016: Nothing to Something (JFK Resolute Entertainment Music Label)
- 2020 : Nobody Holy (JFK Resolute Entertainment Music Label)

=== Singles ===
- 2014: Tell Them
- 2015: Oshere
- 2016: Call Me
- 2016 : Escape
- 2016: Touch Your Toes
- 2016: Get Down ft Uhuru, Dj Maphorisa
- 2019: Hold Up
- 2019: For Your Matter featuring 2Baba
- 2020 : Passmark featuring Slimcase

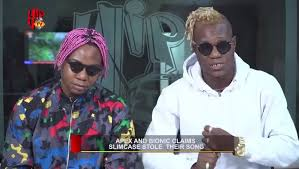
Apex and Bionic addressing the Passmark Controversy with slimcase on Hiptv

== Selected videography ==
- 2019 : Hold up
