= Codename, Vol. 2 =

Codename Vol. 2

Studio album by Dremo
- Released: April 17, 2020
- Genre: Afro-Pop; Hip Hop; Afrobeats
- Length: 36:00
- Language: English; Pidgin
- Label: Davido Music Worldwide(DMW)
- Producer: Aboriomoh Femi Raymond

Dremo chronology
Icen B4 the Cake (EP) (2019)	Codename Vol. 2 (2020)	Ea$t N We$t(EP) (2021)

Codename Vol. 2 is an album by Nigerian singer Dremo. The album was released on 17 April 2020.

== Background ==
Codename Vol. 2 has 12 tracks and has a running time of 36 minutes. The album features Davido, Falz, Sinzu, Peruzzi, Idowest, Lil Frosh, The Flowolf, and Knuck. It is produced by Benjamz, Alpha Ojini, Fresh VDM, Vsix, Samfire amongst others.

== Reception ==
Motolani Alake of Pulse Nigeria rated the album 6.0/10, stating that "Codename goes from trap heavy rap songs that showcase an angry, aggressive and vindictive Dremo to talking about sex and vanity on pop records to love songs".

24hrsreport said that Codename Vol. 2 was considerably better than Codename Vol. 1 in terms of what is being addressed and his overall delivery, adding that the album could have done a little better in the content department. The album was rated 6.5 at the end.

On a final note of a review by Notjustok, Emmanuel Esomnofu opined that "On Codename Vol. 2 Album, Dremo's process, and rapping (very often disguised as singing) is yet developing", adding that at the moment, he has delivered an enjoyable project.

== Track listing ==
No.	Title	Length
1.	"Stfu"	2:07
2.	"Collect"	3:10
3.	"Pepper"	3:14
4.	"Who's Your Guy"	1:55
5.	"Pray"	1:33
6.	"Alasheju"	2:50
7.	"Konjinaba" (featuring Naira Marley)	3:16
8.	"Gugudemap" (featuring Sinzu, Idowest, Knucklez, Lil Frosh)	3:54
9.	"Ghetto Luv" (featuring Peruzzi)	3:49
10.	"Mabel" (featuring Davido)	2:50
11.	"Sweet Pain" (featuring the Flowolf)	2:33
12.	"Sharp Sharp" (featuring Falz)	2:52
Total length:		36:00
