= Old Romance =

- Album artwork for Old Romance

Studio album by Tekno
- Released: 10 December 2020
- Genre: Afro-fusion; R&B; alternative pop
- Length: 40:00
- Label: Island; Cartel
- Producer: Tekno (also exec.); Killertunes; Spax; Clemzy; Benjamz; Blaisebeatz; Zaki Beatz; Phantom; Wise Don

Tekno chronology
Old Romance (2020)	The More The Better (2022)

Singles from Old Romance
- 1. "Enjoy" Released: November 20, 2020

Old Romance is the debut studio album by Nigerian singer-songwriter Tekno. It was released on 10 December 2020, by Island Records and Cartel Entertainment. The album combines elements of R&B and Afropop with neo-soul percussive rhythms. Old Romance received mixed reviews from music critics, as Motolani Alake for Pulse Nigeria commended Tekno for having "an uncanny understanding of music and sounds"

== Background ==
Tekno recorded Old Romance after series of hit songs, collaborations and appearance on various events. On November 15, 2020, Tekno teased fans about the release of his debut album Old Romance.

== Composition ==
The album opening track “Sku Sku” clears the air on Tekno's vocal chord and the smoothness of his range, while delivering a love song that is as emotional as it is honest. In “Enjoy”, the project lead single boasts all of Tekno's trademark, and is the albums's centrepiece backed by the ethereal but groovy Blaise Beats-produced beat. Its Afrobeat-inspired instrumental is a vibe. It rolls off Tekno's tongue with a smoothness that puts him in a class of his own. In “Uptown Girl”, Tekno expresses the emotive record, where he reminisce on a love come up and how she mean to him. The a sweet ballad sees Tekno reflecting about his love with onomatopoeia sounds. Old Romance has its moments of brilliance. 'Armaggedon,' 'Catalia,' 'Family Issues,' 'Designer,' and 'Mistakes' are examples of records with immediate resonance and deliberate shock value.

== Critical reception ==
Professional ratings
Review scores
Source	Rating
Pulse Nigeria	5.6/10

Old Romance received mixed reviews from music critics. In review for Mp3bullet praised the project for often bring a temporal rush of excitement to the fans, and added it on mentions of top 10 best album of 2020. In review for Rolling Stone, they wrote that ‘Old Romance is by far the most promising thing Tekno has done since “Pana” (The circular guitar figures in the new track “Dana” even evoke that older hit.) “Neighbour” is joined by tracks like “Uptown Girl” and “Catalia,” which effectively merge Tekno's yearning and flirting with lithe, zippy beats.” In Review for Pulse Nigeria, Motolani Alake said "Kudos to Tekno's A&R, who tries to find a conceptual nexus/central theme for this album. It ties into Tekno's strengths as an artist, He has never been the greatest storyteller, neither has his music ever been about astute songwriting. What he excels on has always been his ability to produce the appropriate bits of onomatopeia, vibes and social media bars that make songs resonate. He's the bridge between Wizkid and Kizz Daniel“

== Track listing ==
No.	Title	Writer(s)	Producer(s)	Length
1.	"Sku Sku"	Augustine Miles Kelechi	Killertunes; Tekno	3:03
2.	"Tumbo"	Kelechi	Spax; Tekno	2:42
3.	"Uptown Girl"	Kelechi	Spax; Tekno	2:32
4.	"Catalia"	Kelechi	Phantom; Tekno	3:00
5.	"Addicted"	Kelechi	Spax; Tekno	2:59
6.	"Designer"	Kelechi	Tekno; Zaki Beatz	3:02
7.	"Family Issues"	Kelechi	Spax; Tekno	2:48
8.	"In Love"	Kelechi; Akano Samuel	Spax	3:08
9.	"Neighbour"	Kelechi; Nnawuba Onyebuchi	Clemzy	2:32
10.	"Armageddon"	Kelechi; Benjamin Nnonah	Benjamz	3:04
11.	"Dana"	Kelechi; Marcel Akunwata	Blaisebeatz	3:36
12.	"Enjoy"	Kelechi; Akunwata	Blaisebeatz	2:16
13.	"Ugly Parade"	Kelechi; Wise Don	Wise Don	2:04
14.	"Mistakes"	Kelechi; Nnonah	Benjamz	2:57
Total length:				40:00

== Personnel ==
- Augustine Miles Kelechi - Primary artist, writer
- Killertunes - Production (track 1)
- Spax - Production (track 2, 3, 5, 7, 8)
- Clemzy - Production (track 9)
- Benjamz - Production (track 10, 14)
- Blaisebeatz- Production (track 11, 12)
- Zaki Beatz - Production (tracks 6)
- Phantom - Production (tracks 4)
- Wise Don - Production (track 13)

== Release history ==
Region	Date	Format	Version	Label
Various	10 December 2020	CD, digital download	Standard	Island Records; The Cartel Entertainment
