= Buga (song) =

Single by Kizz Daniel featuring Tekno

from the album Maverick
- Released: 4 May 2022
- Genre: Afro pop; Afrobeats
- Length: 3:03
- Label: Flyboy; Empire
- Songwriters: Oluwatobiloba Daniel Anidugbe; Augustine Miles Kelechi
- Producers: Reward Beatz; Blaisebeatz; Yung Willis

Kizz Daniel singles chronology
| "Lie" (2021) | "Buga" (2022) | "Cough (Odo)" (2022) |

Tekno singles chronology
| "Jinja" (2022) | "Buga" (2022) | "Full Current (That's My Baby)" (2022) |

Music video
- "Buga" on YouTube

"Buga (Lo Lo Lo)", also known as just "Buga", is a song by Nigerian singer Kizz Daniel featuring fellow Nigerian singer Tekno. It was released on 4 May 2022 by Flyboy I.N.C and Empire Distribution as the second single from Daniel's fourth studio album Maverick (2023) and was produced by Reward Beatz, Blaisebeatz, and Yung Willis. The song reached No. 1 on Apple Music's Nigeria Top 100 chart three days after its release, and topped the TurnTable Top 100 for seven weeks and ultimately emerging as the year's leading song. With a record-breaking 57.9 million streams, it achieved the highest streaming numbers ever in a single calendar year in Nigeria. It later became the most Shazamed song in the world after claiming the No. 1 spot in 13 countries.

In addition to topping the streaming charts, "Buga" secured top-five positions in both radio and TV impressions. It won Song of the Year at the Soundcity MVP Awards Festival in 2023 and received a nomination for Song of the Year, Afrobeats Single of the Year, and Headies Viewer's Choice at The Headies 2023. The song was declared as the No. 1 Nigerian song of 2022 by TurnTable magazine, and was ranked #43 on Billboard magazine's list of the 50 Best Afrobeats Songs of All Time.

== Background and release ==
Reward Beatz, one of the song's producers, explained in an interview with TurnTable magazine that he created the beat from scratch in the studio with Kizz Daniel and later sent to him for recording. On the day of the song's release, Kizz Daniel started a viral dance challenge, which launched through his social media page, providing a ₦1,000,000 prize for the best "Buga" video content, with fans acting as the judges. The challenge was won by Chionye Elvira, who was one year old at the time.

== Composition and lyrics ==
The song was recorded in the key of A♭ major with a tempo of 116 BPM. The lyrics of "Buga" focus on confidence and celebration. "Buga" is a Yoruba slang term that means to show off, take pride, or flaunt success. In the song, Kizz Daniel uses it to encourage listeners to enjoy the results of their hard work, celebrate their wins, and keep a positive mindset while avoiding negativity.

== Reception ==
In a review for Afrocritik, Emmanuel Daraloye called "Buga" a "feel-good, perky type of song" infused with amapiano elements, highlighted by log drums and a "sublime" verse from Tekno that complements Daniel's performance. He suggested the song might be an "unofficial song of the summer," comparing it to Wizkid and Tems' impact the previous year, and added that the track's viral dance move has further fueled its popularity across social media platforms. He rated the song a 6.5/10. Gabriel Myers Hansen of Music in Africa said that Kizz Daniel was "very much a linchpin" in Afrobeats whose career had shown steady growth, describing "Buga" as "Afrobeats' leading song," praising its "unique aural draw" and "elegant plainness," noting its sustained momentum beyond TikTok trends, and concluding that the song’s appeal lay in "a singular groove and melody, immense charisma and songwriting that succeeds in cajoling listeners."

== Impact ==
Former Liberian president George Weah, Nigerian Chief of Staff to the President Femi Gbajabiamila, former Nigerian Minister of Transportation Rotimi Amaechi, and the 16th president of Nigeria Bola Tinubu, all shared videos of themselves dancing to the song.

== Music video ==
The music video for "Buga," directed by TG Omori, was published to YouTube on 22 June 2022. It showcases a celebratory theme, featuring a carnival-like setting shot in Lagos and Abuja. The video, featuring a cameo from Oga Sabinus, includes vibrant choreography and festive visuals that align with the song's message of enjoyment and success. It amassed over 3.8 million views within just two days.

== Commercial performance ==
Upon its release, "Buga" achieved commercial success and set multiple records. By 16 May 2022, two weeks after its debut, the song recorded 11.4 million equivalent streams and 47.5 million radio impressions, breaking the record for the largest streaming week since TurnTable began tracking in July 2020. It debuted at No. 1 on the TurnTable Top 50, becoming Kizz Daniel’s third chart-topping single and Tekno's first. By 25 May 2022, "Buga" simultaneously held the records for the highest weekly streaming tally, highest weekly radio tally, and highest total chart activity recorded by a song in a single week. During that week, it tallied 12.3 million equivalent streams (up 7.8%) and 71.6 million radio impressions (up 50.7%). It also remained at No. 1 with nearly twice the points of the No. 2 song on the TurnTable Top 50 chart.

By 1 June 2022, "Buga" spent a third consecutive week atop the streaming chart with 9.03 million equivalent streams and led the radio chart for a second week with 59.3 million impressions. At the time, it held the three highest chart point tallies in TurnTable history, recorded on the charts dated 16 May, 23 May, and 30 May 2022. By 13 June 2022, the song matched the five-week No. 1 runs of Skiibii's "Baddest Boy (Remix)" and Black Sherif's "Kwaku the Traveller" as the longest-running chart-toppers of 2022. It also recorded a fifth consecutive week as Nigeria’s most streamed song and remained No. 1 on the radio chart. By 20 June 2022, "Buga" set a new record for the most weeks at No. 1 in 2022, spending six weeks atop the TurnTable Top 50. On 19 May 2022, Shazam announced that "Buga" was the most Shazamed song in the world. The song also set a new streaming record by becoming the first song to reach one million streams within 24 hours on Boomplay Music.

== Controversy ==
In April 2024, Kizz Daniel and Tekno were involved in a public dispute over the royalties from "Buga". The controversy began after a blog claimed that Tekno had said in an interview that he had no formal agreement regarding his feature on the song and received 50% of its revenue, reportedly amounting to nearly ₦1,000,000. Tekno denied the claim, describing the interview as "fake" and suggesting that Kizz Daniel did not have such funds to distribute. Kizz Daniel subsequently responded on Twitter, accusing Tekno of disrespect and claiming that "Buga" had revived his music career. Tekno replied by questioning Daniel's motives and warning him not to "play" with him, suggesting that Daniel's remarks stemmed from insecurity. The exchange continued on social media and attracted attention from fans and media outlets.

== Accolades ==
Awards and nominations for "Buga"
| Organization | Year | Category | Result | Ref. |
|---|---|---|---|---|
| All Africa Music Awards | 2023 | Song of the Year | Nominated | |
| All Africa Music Awards | 2023 | Best African Collaboration | Nominated | |
| All Africa Music Awards | 2023 | Best African Video | Won | |
| All Africa Music Awards | 2023 | Best Artiste/Duo/Group in African Pop | Nominated | |
| All Africa Music Awards | 2023 | Best Male Artiste in West Africa (Kizz Daniel for "Buga") | Nominated | |
| All Africa Music Awards | 2023 | Producer of the Year (Reward Beatz for "Buga") | Nominated | |
| The Headies | 2023 | Song of the Year | Nominated | |
| The Headies | 2023 | Afrobeats Single of the Year | Nominated | |
| The Headies | 2023 | Headies' Viewers' Choice | Nominated | |
| African Entertainment Awards USA | 2023 | Song of the Year | Won | |
| Soundcity MVP Awards Festival | 2023 | Song of the Year | Won | |

== Charts ==
=== Weekly charts ===
Chart performance for "Buga"
| Chart (2022) | Peak position |
|---|---|
| Nigeria (TurnTable Top 50) | 1 |
| UK Afrobeats (Official Charts) | 2 |

=== Year-end charts ===
2022 year-end chart performance for "Buga"
| Chart (2022) | Position |
|---|---|
| Nigeria (TurnTable Top 100) | 9 |

== Certifications ==
Certifications for Buga
| Region | Certification | Certified units/sales |
|---|---|---|
| Nigeria (TCSN) | 4× Platinum | 400,000^{‡} |
| United States (RIAA) | Gold | 500,000^{‡} |
| United Kingdom (BPI) | Silver | 200,000^{‡} |
^{‡} Sales+streaming figures based on certification alone.

== Personnel ==
Credits adapted from Apple Music.

- Oluwatobiloba Daniel Anidugbe – vocals, songwriter
- Augustine Miles Kelechi - vocals, songwriter
- Reward Beatz - production
- Blaisebeatz - production
- Yung Willis - production

== Release history ==
Release history and formats for "Buga"
| Region | Date | Format | Label |
|---|---|---|---|
| Various | 4 March 2022 | Streaming; digital download | Flyboy; Empire |

== See also ==
- List of best-selling singles by country
