= Dremo =

Nigerian rapper

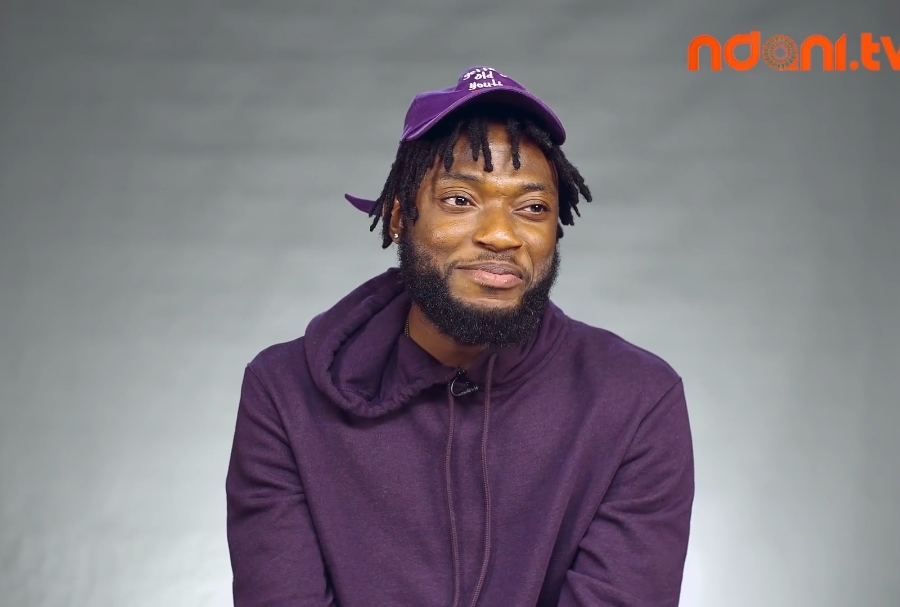

Background information
- Also known as: Dremo
- Born: Aboriomoh Femi Raymond
- Origin: Okpella Edo State, Nigeria
- Genres: Afropop, hip hop
- Occupations: Songwriter, singer, rapper, record producer, and stage performer
- Instrument: Vocals
- Years active: 2013–present

Aboriomoh Femi Raymond, known by his stage name Dremo, is a Nigerian songwriter, singer, record producer, recording artist, and stage performer. He was currently signed to Davido Music Worldwide (DMW).

== Early life ==
Dremo is from Okpella Edo State, Nigeria where he was born, but he grew up in Ibadan, Oyo State. He attended George and Duke High School in Ibadan, and he later dropped out of National Open University of Nigeria after his second year to get a deal with DMW.

== Career ==
Dremo began music professionally when he was signed to A.P.P.E music entertainment, where he released 'Normal Levelz' and 'OBT'.

On 5 April 2016, he was officially signed into Davido Music Worldwide by Davido alongside Mayorkun. On 20 July 2018, Dremo released a 9-track debut EP titled "Codename Volume 1". On 26 August 2019, he released a 5-track EP, "Icen B4 the Cake" as a follow-up to "Codename Volume 1". On 17 April 2020, he released "Codename Volume 2" with 12 tracks. On 23 April, Dremo together with Jeriq released the EP 'Ea$t N We$t'. On 4 August 2021, he released a single featuring Patoranking titled 'Wonder'.

In 2022, Dremo released notable freestyles and singles including "Monaco" and "Talk N Do". He also featured on the remix of Davido's "Stand Strong", earning praise for his lyrical dexterity and delivery.

On 29 May 2024, he released a surprise EP titled "We Not Done Yet", consisting of four tracks that showcased his rap range and included a cypher-style song featuring 12 guest artists. The project was described by Album Talks as "a showcase of Dremo's consistency and street resonance".

In October 2024, he premiered the "We Not Done Yet deluxe", adding two new tracks and a collaboration with Tomi Thomas, which expanded its thematic and sonic scope.

In February 2024, Dremo released the single "Pressure" featuring DanDizzy. The track was praised by Grungecake for its hard-hitting bars and energy, highlighting both artists' lyrical strengths.

== Discography ==
=== Albums and EPs ===
- Codename, Vol. 1 (2018)
- Icen B4 the Cake (EP) (2019)
- Codename, Vol. 2 (2020)
- Ea$t N We$t (EP) (2021)
- We Not Done yet (EP) (2024)
- We Not Done yet Deluxe (EP) (2024)
- Man2Man (2026)
- Man2Man, Vol.2 (2026)
- The Chronicles of Bamidele (EP) (2026)

=== Selected singles ===
- Fela (2016)
- Back 2 Back (2016)
- Ojere (2016)
- Shayo (2016)
- KPA (2018)
- Bigger Meat (2018)
- Nobody (2018)
- Ringer (2019)
- E Be Tins (2020)
- Konjinaba (2020)
- Wahala Dey (2020)
- East To West (2021)
- Wonder (2021)
- Talk N Do (2021)

== Awards ==
Year	Award	Category	Recipient	Result	Ref
2016	Nigerian Teen Choice Awards	Choice New Hip Hop Act 2016	Himself	Won	
2017	City People Entertainment Awards	Rookie of the Year	Himself	Won	
2018	City People Entertainment Awards	Rap Album of the Year	Codename Vol. 1	Won	
