= Pana (song) =

Single by Tekno
- Released: 22 July 2016
- Genre: Afropop
- Length: 3:07
- Label: Made Men Music Group
- Songwriter: Augustine Miles Kelechi
- Producer: Krizbeatz

Tekno singles chronology
"Abasi" (2016)	"Pana" (2016)	"Caro" (2016)

Music video
- ”Pana” on YouTube

"Pana" is a song recorded by Nigerian singer-songwriter Tekno. Written by the singer and produced by Krizbeatz, the song was released by Made Men Music Group on 22 July 2016. It received mostly positive reviews from music critics and was ranked second on MTV Base's list of "Hottest track of 2016". "Pana" also made Soundcity TV's Top Ten count down.

It won Song of the Year at the 2016 Soundcity MVP Awards Festival and was nominated for Best Single of the Year at the 2017 Nigeria Entertainment Awards.

== Background and reception ==
Krizbeatz revealed that the beat produced for "Pana" was not originally for Tekno. The song is characterized as an Afropop song with elements of R&B. OkayAfrica included the song in the 10 Best Nigerian Songs of 2016 and describe it as a "slow soother, much like 'Duro' and 'Diana'" Jaguda named it #1 on their list of the Top 30 Nigerian Songs of 2016. Oris Aigbokhaevbolo said "Pana" showed Tekno's skill for hit-making over meaning, calling him "a master of the pop tune" while noting that the song relied on "rhythmic gibberish" that worked for the moment. Wilfred Okiche said "Pana" worked because of its "silly, mischievous but endlessly rewarding" feel and its catchy beat, noting that Tekno's charm and unpretentious style drove the song's impact even though the video "does not elevate the song."

== Commercial performance ==
The song became a continental hit and was the second most searched Nigerian song on Google in 2016. It also charted at number one on Apple Music in several countries including Nigeria, Kenya and Ghana and it went on to become Tekno's most popular record with over 50 million Spotify streams as of April 2022.

== Music video ==
The music video was released on 22 August 2016, directed by Clarence Peters. It became the third music video by a Nigerian artiste to surpass the 100 million views milestone on Youtube, and the top five most viewed Nigerian music video of all time as of 2021.

== Awards and nominations ==
Year	Event	Award	Result	Ref(s)
2016	WatsUp TV Africa Music Video Awards	Best West African Video	Nominated	
2016	WatsUp TV Africa Music Video Awards	Best African Male Video	Nominated	
2016	WatsUp TV Africa Music Video Awards	African Video of the Year	Nominated	
2016	WatsUp TV Africa Music Video Awards	Best Afro Pop Video	Nominated	
2016	Soundcity MVP Awards Festival	Song of the Year	Won	
2016	tooXclusive Awards	Certified Banger of the Year	Won	
2017	COSON Song Awards	Best Song in Lyrics	Nominated	
2017	COSON Song Awards	Song of Songs	Nominated	
2017	Nigeria Entertainment Awards	Hottest Single of the Year	Nominated	

== Release history ==
Region	Date	Format	Label	Ref.
Various	22 July 2016	Digital download; streaming	Made Men Music Group	
