= Tekno (musician) =

Nigerian singer, songwriter and record producer (born 1992)

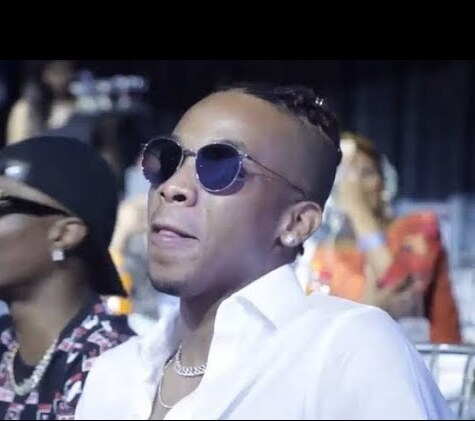

Background information
- Also known as: Golden Boy of Africa; Slim Daddy; Alhaji Tekno
- Born: Augustine Miles Kelechi Okechukwu; 17 December 1992 (age 33); Bauchi, Bauchi State, Nigeria
- Genres: Afrobeats; hip-hop; R&B
- Occupations: Singer; songwriter; producer
- Instruments: Vocals; keyboard
- Years active: 2012–present
- Label: Cartel

Augustine Miles Kelechi Okechukwu (born 17 December 1992), known professionally as Tekno Miles or simply Tekno, is a Nigerian singer, songwriter and record producer. His song "Enjoy" was the closing song in the seventh episode in season three of the Emmy-winning TV series Ted Lasso (2020).

== Life and career ==
=== Early life and career beginnings ===
Tekno is from Ivo in Ebonyi State, Nigeria. He was born in Bauchi State into a family of six — five boys and one girl. He was raised in several parts of the country including Nasarawa State, Kaduna (the capital city of Kaduna State) and Abuja (the federal capital territory of Nigeria) due to the fact that his father was a member of the Nigerian Army. At the age of 8, Tekno Miles was enrolled in a music school where he learned and mastered the rudiments of playing the piano and guitar. He is the elder brother to another Nigerian musical act, Spotless.

=== 2012–2017: K-Money, MMMG, "Holiday", "Duro", and "Wash" ===
Tekno Miles was first signed under K-Money Entertainment. His breakout single titled "Holiday", was released under the imprint. With featured vocals from Davido, "Holiday" was positively accepted and gained massive airplay. In 2012, Tekno Miles was spotted by renowned Nigerian comedian Julius Agwu at an event in Abuja, after Tekno Miles received a standing ovation following the performance of a song titled "Onye Ne Kwu", his remix of Ice Prince's "Oleku". It was at the same event he met Iyanya and Ubi Franklin, the manager of Made Men Music Group and they became friends. Ubi and Iyanya eventually encouraged Tekno Miles to move to Lagos to further his music career. On 5 October 2013, he signed a recording contract with Made Men Music Group (MMMG), under which he released singles like "Dance" and "Anything". These singles earned him a nomination in the "Best New act of the Year" category at the 2014 Nigeria Entertainment Awards.

On 18 June 2015, Tekno Miles released his hit single titled "Duro", which was produced by DJ Coublon. "Duro" was positively received both in Africa and in the US. A remix which featured Phyno and Flavour N'abania was released on 16 November 2015. It topped several charts in Nigeria and on the international scene, it peaked at number 5 on Capital XTRA's Afrobeats Chart: Top 10 for September 2015. On 20 November 2015, Tekno Miles released a single titled "Wash". The song was produced by DJ Coublon with the video directed by AJE Filmworks. On 27 December 2016, Tekno was named one of the top ten hip-hop and R&B talents to watch in the United States in 2017 by Billboard. tekno also known as the Pana master has changed his name to Big Tek. In 2016, Elton John played Tekno song titled 'Diana' on one of his episode of Rocket Hour radio show on Apple Music. However, On 13 October 2017, Tekno was featured by DJ Cuppy on a song titled Green Light, which was officially DJ Cuppy's first single. On 12 December 2017, Canadian rapper Drake posted images of himself with Tekno to his Instagram page, captioning them, "Tekkk time."

=== 2018–present: "Freak Me", "Won't Be Late", "Don't Jealous Me", and Old Romance ===
On 10 August 2018, American singer Ciara, has teamed up with Tekno, for a collaboration titled "Freak Me." Tekno announced the song's release and revealed the cover art on his Instagram account @teknoofficial on Friday. On 15 August 2019, Tekno was announced as one of the producers of 'Won't Be Late' by Swae Lee featuring Drake. In June 2018, Tekno signed a distribution deal with Universal Music Group Nigeria (UMGN), a division of Universal Music Group in charge of West Africa, as well as the UK-based Island Records. In July 2019, Tekno was featured on Beyoncé's The Lion King: The Gift soundtrack on the song "Don't Jealous Me". On 6 December 2020, Tekno released the tracklist for his long-awaited debut album, Old Romance. In 2022, he featured in Kizz Daniel's "Buga", a track that became the No. 1 shazamed tune within the same year. Also, within the same year, Davido revealed how Tekno had assisted in reviving his career at a very crucial moment when he needed fresh inspiration.

Tekno has released the music video for his latest single "Puttin". On the back of his 2023 album, The More The Better, award -winning Nigerian musician and producer, Tekno, has kicked off a new musical era with his latest song, dubbed, Wayo. This new single is the first offering of his new partnership with Mr Eazi's emPawa Africa, which will see Tekno becoming an investor and partner in the label.

== Personal life ==
In May 2018, Tekno's girlfriend gave birth to a girl child. In 2020, Tekno announced that he has relocated to the United States. This was a reaction to the news of the proposal presented at the Nigerian National Assembly for the change of the country's name to UAR, which was an acronym for United African Republic or United Alkebulan Republic on 2 June.

In 2017, Tekno made it known to the public that he has acid reflux. The condition had gotten complicated and had ultimately affected his vocal cords. He had to undergo surgery to tackle the issue.

== Discography ==
Studio albums

- Old Romance (2020)
- The More The Better (2023)
- Where Did Love Go? (2026)

== Awards and nominations ==
Year	Award ceremony	Prize	Recipient/Nominated work	Result	Ref
2014	Nigeria Entertainment Awards	Best New Act of the Year	Himself	Nominated	
2015	Nigeria Music Video Awards	Best Pop Extra Video	"Duro"	Won	
2016	Nigeria Entertainment Awards	Hottest Single of the Year	"Duro"	Nominated	
2016	Nigeria Entertainment Awards	Best Music Video of the Year	"Duro"	Nominated	
2016	Nigeria Entertainment Awards	Afropop Artist of the Year	Himself	Nominated	
2016	MTV Africa Music Awards	Best New Act	Himself	Won	
2016	WatsUp TV Africa Music Video Awards	African Video of the Year	"Pana"	Nominated	
2016	WatsUp TV Africa Music Video Awards	Best African Male Video	"Pana"	Nominated	
2016	WatsUp TV Africa Music Video Awards	Best West African Video	"Pana"	Nominated	
2016	WatsUp TV Africa Music Video Awards	Best Afro Pop Video	"Pana"	Nominated	
2016	Soundcity MVP Awards Festival	Song of the Year	"Pana"	Won	
2017	BET Awards	Best International Act: Africa	Himself	Nominated	
2017	Nigeria Entertainment Awards	Hottest Single of the Year	"Pana"	Nominated	

== See also ==
- List of Igbo people
- List of Nigerian musicians
