= Native Records (Nigerian record label) =

Nigerian record label

- Industry: Music
- Genre: Afrobeats, Trap, Hip-hop, Alté
- Founded: 2022; 4 years ago
- Founder: Teezee; Sholz; Chubbziano
- Headquarters: United Kingdom
- Area served: Africa
- Key people: Chubbziano (co-president); Teezee (co-president); Sholz (co-president)
- Owner: The Native Networks
- Parent: The Native

Native Records is a UK-based Nigerian record label owned by The Native Networks and formed by The Native magazine co-founders Chubbziano and Teezee. In 2022, following the release of the Native Sound System debut long-play Nativeworld on 18 August 2022, the record label was unveiled to the public. The label is home to Teezee, Native Sound System, and Odumodublvck.

== History ==
NATIVE Records is founded by the Nigerian music magazine The Native in 2022, as a division of The Native Networks. The label is headed by its co-presidents Chubbziano, Teni Zaccheaus, and Sholz Fagbemi. On 20 September 2022, the label went into a joint venture partnership with the multinational label Def Jam, with the sole aim to sign and develop talents in Africa and its diaspora.

On 23 November 2022, Native announced the signing of its first recording act Odumodublvck, and went on to release his first single with the label, titled "Picanto" featuring ECko Miles, and Zlatan. On 29 November 2022, Teezee announce the signing of Smada. and released his first single with the label, titled "Ye Anthem", featuring King Perryy and Toyé, with an accompanying music video.

On 5 December 2022, Odumodu Blvck dropped the official video of 'Picanto' featuring Zlatan and Ecko Miles. On 6 December 2022, Smada released a new version of "Ye Anthem", featuring DJ Yk Mule, with another version released on 8 December 2022, titled "Ye Anthem (Mellow & Sleazy Remix)", with a guest appearance from Mellow & Sleazy. The same day, the label co-president Teni Zaccheaus (aka. Teezee), released his first single under the label, titled "Manhattan" featuring Cruel Santino, with production from GMK. In 2024, Rigo Kamp was introduced to the public with a 2-pack single titled "Summer", and "Morning Sun", produced by Odunsi (The Engine), and GMK. On 3 April 2025, Rigo Kamp, released his eponymous debut extended play. On 27 December 2025, RollingStone listed "Marathon", the opening track from Rigo's eponymous EP, as one of its 45 Best Afropop Songs of 2025.

== Artists ==
=== Current acts ===
Act	Year signed	Releases under the label
Teezee	2022	
Sholz	2022	
Native Sound System	2022	1
Odumodublvck	2022	1
Rigo Kamp	2024	1

== Discography ==
=== Studio albums ===
Artist	Album/Mixtapes	Details
Native Sound System	Nativeworld	Released: 18 August 2022; Chart Position: —; Certification: —
Odumodublvck	EZIOKWU	Released: 6 October 2023; Chart Position: —; Certification: —

=== Singles ===
List of singles released by artists signed to Native Records
Artist	Title	Year	Album	Release date
Native Sound System	"Runaway" (featuring Lojay and Ayra Starr)	2022	Nativeworld	18 August 2022
Native Sound System & Wani	"Wedding Ring" (featuring Odunsi (The Engine), Odeal, and BOJ)	2022	Nativeworld	18 August 2022
Odumodublvck	"Picanto" (featuring ECko Miles & Zlatan)	2022	TBA	
Smada	"Ye Anthem" (featuring King Perryy & Toyé)	2022	TBA	
Smada	"Ye Anthem (DJ YK Mule Remix)" (featuring DJ YK Mule)	2022	TBA	
Smada	"Ye Anthem (Mellow & Sleazy Remix)" (featuring Mellow & Sleazy)	2022	TBA	
Teezee	"Manhattan" (featuring Cruel Santino)	2022	TBA	
Native Sound System	"Cruel Love" (featuring Sholz, Tar1q, and Somadina)	2023	TBA	
Native Sound System	"Vex" (featuring Sholz, Candy Bleakz, Teezee, and Odumodublvck)	2023	TBA	
Odumodublvck	"Declan Rice"	2023	TBA	
Smada	"Papilo (Smadamodu)" (featuring Odumodublvck)	2023	TBA	
Odumodublvck	"Dog Eat Dog II" (featuring Cruel Santino and Bella Shmurda)	2023	TBA	
