= Odumodublvck =

Nigerian rapper (born 1993)

- Also known as: Big Kala; Small Kala; Big Gun; Oye Pumper; Vladimirovich; INDUSTRY MACHINE
- Born: Tochukwu Gbubemi Ojogwu; 19 October 1993 (age 32); Lagos, Nigeria
- Origin: Abuja
- Occupations: Rapper; songwriter; record producer
- Instruments: Grime; drill; Afrobeats
- Years active: 2017–present
- Labels: NATIVE; Def Jam

Tochukwu Gbubemi Ojogwu (born 19 October 1993), known professionally as Odumodublvck (stylized in all caps), is a Nigerian rapper, singer and songwriter. He is known for his stage performances, genre-blend and often wearing the Okpu Agu hat. The Okpu-Agu is traditionally worn by warriors in Igboland. Odumodublvck is a member of the hip-hop collective Anti World Gangstars. He currently resides in Abuja, Nigeria. He is regarded as one of the most influential figures in modern Nigerian hip-hop.

== Early life ==
Hails from Delta State and born in Lagos, he relocated with his family to Abuja at the age of 7. He had his junior high education at Christ the King College at Gwagwalada Abuja, where he got the stage name "Odumodu" in his second year of junior high. He attended Bowen University for his first year of tertiary education, then left and finished up at the University of Lagos, Akoka.

== Career ==
On 26 March 2022, Odumodublvck performed at the Jameson Connects concert alongside DRB LasGidi, and Victony at Abuja.

In 2022, Odumodublvck released a joint studio album with B.O.C Madaki, titled The Drop, and a few months later he released a follow-up single, his first under NATIVE Records, "Picanto", featuring Ecko Miles and Zlatan. On 21 November 2022, the single debuted on TurnTable Bubbling Under Top 100 at number 8, and number 15 on Nigeria Hip-Hop/Rap Songs chart. On 28 November 2022, "Picanto" debuted at number 79 on the Top 100 and peaked at number 65. It also peaked at number 44 on Nigeria Radio and number 6 on the Nigeria Hip-Hop/Rap Songs chart.

In December 2022, he signed a record deal with NATIVE Records, in partnership with Def Jam. On 8 December 2022, he won the Next Rated Artist category at Galaxy Music Awards. The rapper got a new Lexus IS 350 as part of the prize that comes with the Next Rated award. On 9 December 2022, he was announced on the lineup of Vertical Rave concert opening acts alongside Teezee, Cruel Santino, PsychoYP, Odunsi the Engine, held on 17 December 2022.

On 23 January 2023, he ranked number 4 on TurnTable's NXT Emerging Top Artistes. On 24 March 2023, he released his first single titled "Declan Rice", shortly after surviving a surgery that almost took his life. On 27 March 2023, Odumodublvck earned his first top 10 entry on the TurnTable official Nigeria Top 100 Songs chart at number 8. On 1 April 2023, "Declan Rice" led TheCable Lifestyle airplay chart at number 1. In 2023, Def Jam Recordings signed with Odumodublvck upon the release of EZIOKWU mixtape.

West Ham united captain, Declan Rice expressed his excitement as Nigerians sang his name, courtesy of Odumodublvck. On 15 July 2023, Arsenal announced the signing of Declan Rice using his song in the background.

On the TurnTable Charts, "Blood On The Dance Floor" and "Cast" claimed the top spot in the TurnTable Top 100 songs. Simultaneously, Eziokwu (Uncut) secured the number one position for the album category on the TurnTable Official Top 50 Albums Chart in Nigeria. "100 Million", featuring Tiwa Savage, was another hit and was well received song by his fans and lovers.

On 18 December 2024 and 25 January 2025, Odumodublvck revealed in interviews with Beat FM and Joey Akan that after recording his single "Asampete", a track from the Antiworld Gangstars album NOTHING CHANGED, he felt something was missing. According to him, the song had a sound reminiscent of Mavin Records founder, Don Jazzy, and he believed adding Don Jazzy's vocals would complete it. Don Jazzy agreed to collaborate, recording his part and gifting Odumodublvck $10,000 upon completion. Additionally, he allowed Odumodublvck and the Antiworld Gangstars collective to retain full royalties while providing his vocals for free. He also gave them the option to credit him as a featured artist if they wished.

=== Political awareness ===
On 25 May 2023, Odumodu tweeted about the presidential inauguration of the 16th president of Nigeria, Bola Tinubu, and the Renewed Hope concert. In his tweet, he wrote, "They tried to get me to perform at the inauguration. They did not do their research." However, on 2 March 2023, following the release of NATIVE Sound System single "Vex", Odumodu declared his support for Peter Obi in the second verse, "I dey hope on Peter Obi to save me", and earlier described himself as Peter Obi's running mate on social media.

=== Controversy and misogynist claims ===
Odumodublvck has been the center of public criticism over claims of being a misogynist. He was described as a woman abuser by a user on X (formerly Twitter).

He faced more public backlash in November 2023 following his lyrics in Shallipopi's hit single, "Cast". The lines which read "If she no f–k o, if she no s–k / Who go pay for her wig and handbag?" was criticized heavily with internet users calling out Odumodublvk for his use of brash lyrics and misrepresentation of women in his songs.

Odumodublvck has repeatedly dismissed these claims insisting in a series of interviews and tweets that he promotes women and there is no woman who can come out to say "Odumodu laid his hand on me".

== Artistry ==
Odumodublvck is known for fusing Afrobeat, with Drill and Grime music. According to Dazed, "His unrelenting style of drill employs high-life inspired melodies and Nigerian Pidgin English to tell vivid stories about his community and everyday experiences – his narrative style is so specific to Nigerians, it's hard to pick up on the nuances as an outsider."

== Discography ==
List of studio albums, with selected details and chart positions
Title	Details	Peak chart positions
Title	Details	NGR
Industry Machine	Released: 5 October 2025; Label: Kalacious, Native, Def Jam; Formats: Digital download	1

=== Mixtapes ===
List of studio mixtape albums, with selected details and chart positions
Title	Details	Peak chart positions
Title	Details	NGR
T.A.B.S (TO ALL Blvcksheep)	Released: 22 August 2017; Label: Blvcksheep Media House; Formats: Digital download	—
Anti-World Gangstars	Released: 15 December 2018; Label: Blvcksheep Media House; Formats: Digital download	—
Odiegwu	Released: 3 December 2021; Label: Blvcksheep Media House; Formats: Digital download	—
The Drop	Released: 18 February 2022; Label: Gametime Records; Formats: Digital download	—
Eziokwu	Released: 6 October 2023; Label: NATIVE, Def Jam, UMG; Formats: Digital download	1
The Machine Is Coming	Released: 31 March 2025; Label: NATIVE, Def Jam, UMG; Formats: Digital download	1

=== Extended plays ===
List of extended plays, with selected details and chart positions
Title	EP details	Peak chart positions
Title	EP details	NGR
Time & Chance	Released: 19 October 2018; Format: Digital download, streaming; Label: Blvcksheep Media House	—
TADE (The Afro Drill Experiment)	Released: 1 July 2020; Format: Digital download, streaming; Label: Coincidence Music & Entertainment, Blvcksheep	—
Time & Chance	Released: 12 March 2021; Format: Digital download, streaming; Label: TopBoy Music	—
T.A.D.E II (The Afro Drill Experiment II)	Released: 1 July 2022; Format: Digital download, streaming; Label:	—

=== Selected singles ===
List of singles, showing title and year released with selected chart positions
Title	Year	Chart positions							Certifications	Album
Title	Year	NGR	NGR Rap	NGR Alt.	UK	UK Afrobeats	US	US Afrobeats	Certifications	Album
"Dog Eat Dog"	2022	96	—	—	—	—	—	—	TCSN: Platinum	Non-album single
"Picanto" (featuring Ecko Miles, and Zlatan)	2022	25	6	—	—	—	—	—		Eziokwu
"Declan Rice"	2023	8	1	—	—	—	—	27	TCSN: Gold	Eziokwu
"Dog Eat Dog II" (featuring Cruel Santino, and Bella Shmurda)	2023	17	—	1	—	—	—	—		Eziokwu
"Firegun" (featuring Fireboy DML)	2023	10	—	—	—	15	—	—		Eziokwu
"Wotowoto Seasoning"	2023	—	—	—	—	—	—	—		Non-album single
"Declan Rice (Arsenal Version)"	2023	—	—	—	—	—	—	—		Non-album single
"MC Oluomo"	2023	33	—	—	—	—	—	—		EZIOKWU
"Blood on the Dance Floor" (featuring Bloody Civilian & Wale)	2023	1	—	—	—	10	—	18		EZIOKWU
Motion Sickness (featuring Zlatan)	2026									

== Accolades ==
Year	Awards ceremony	Award description(s)	Nominated work	Results	Ref
2022	Galaxy Music Awards	Next Rated Artist	Himself	Won	
2023	African Muzik Magazine Awards	Best Newcomer	Himself	Won	
2023	African Muzik Magazine Awards	Best Male Rap Act	Himself	Nominated	
2023	The Headies	Rookie of the Year	Himself	Won	
2023	The Headies	Best Rap Single	"Declan Rice"	Won	
2023	Trace Awards & Festival	Best Newcomer	Himself	Nominated	
2024	BET Hip Hop Awards	Best International Flow	Himself	Nominated	
2024	Telecel Ghana Music Awards	International Collaboration of the Year	"Wotowoto Seasoning"	Nominated	
2025	Trace Awards & Festival	Best Hip-Hop Artist	Himself	Nominated	
2025	Trace Awards & Festival	Best Collaboration	"Wotowoto Seasoning"	Nominated	
2025	The Headies	Next Rated	Himself	Won	
2025	The Headies	Best Rap Single	"Cast"	Won	
2025	The Headies	Best Rap Single	"Blood on the Dance Floor"	Nominated	
2025	The Headies	Best Collaboration	"Cast"	Nominated	
2025	The Headies	Best Collaboration	"Blood on the Dance Floor"	Nominated	
2025	The Headies	Viewers Choice	"Cast"	Nominated	
2025	The Headies	Best Rap Album	Eziokwu	Nominated	
2025	The Headies	Best Street-Hop Artiste	Himself	Nominated	
2025	Leadership Awards	Artist of the Year	Himself	Won	
