= Eziokwu =

EZIOKWU

Mixtape by Odumodublvck
- Released: 6 October 2023
- Recorded: 2022–2023
- Genre: Hip-hop; grime; drill; Afropop
- Length: 38:31
- Label: NATIVE Records; Def Jam; UMG
- Producer: Odumodublvck & Teezee (exec.); Spykida; Sholz; Trill Xoe; Ucee; JohnWav; Cross YDC; IceBeatzz; Jimohsoundz; Deepaholiq; Twitchpapiii; Mo. Sounds

Odumodublvck chronology
The Drop (2022)	EZIOKWU (2023)

Singles from EZIOKWU
- 1. "PICANTO" Released: 21 November 2022; 2. "DECLAN RICE" Released: 24 March 2023; 3. "DOG EAT DOG II" Released: 30 May 2023; 4. "FIREGUN" Released: 30 June 2023; 5. "MC OLUOMO" Released: 15 September 2023; 6. "BLOOD ON THE DANCE FLOOR" Released: 5 October 2023

Eziokwu (stylized in all caps; English: Truth) is the fifth mixtape by Nigerian rapper Odumodublvck. It was released on 6 October 2023 by NATIVE Records, and Def Jam, through UMG in partnership with The Native Networks. It was exclusively produced by Odumodublvck, and Teezee, with additional production from Spykida, Sholz, Trill Xoe, JohnWav, Ucee, Cross YDC, Jimohsoundz, Deepaholiq, Twitchpapiii, IceBeatzz, and Mo. Sounds. It features guest appearances from Amaarae, Blaqbonez, Wale, Bloody Civilian, Fireboy DML, Reeplay, Teezee, PsychoYP, Bella Shmurda, Cruel Santino, ECko Miles, and Zlatan. The mixtape’s cover art was created by Olaolu Slawn.

== Background and promotion ==
On 31 August 2023, which was initially scheduled to be the release date of the mixtape. However, in the early hours of the date, he tweeted how deeply sorry he was to move the release date as he believed his fans were not ready for the truth. On 14 September 2023, he signed an exclusive deal with Def Jam Recordings in United States, before the release of his fifth studio mixtape album.

While speaking with Dazed about the name of his mixtape, Odumodublvck said: “Many musicians say, ‘My music is different,’ but is it different? My mixtape is the first time in the history of Nigerian music that an album has come in this form. It has highlife, Afrobeat, Afro-fusion, it has real hip-hop, and it has drill. I did this from scratch; it's me saying that ‘it’s me, I’m the truth.’”

On 16 October 2023, he spoke with Nandi Madida on the inspiration behind the Eziokwu on the Africa Now radio show, Odumodu said: “In as much as it’s a hip-hop album, it has a lot of Afrobeats elements to it, afro-fusion elements, it even has Ghanaian highlife. I try to make a project that has never been made before, or created before, in the history of African music. The sound has this, this, this, and that, but it still sounds like one body of work.” On 17 October 2023, he discussed the album with DJ Target on BBC Radio 1Xtra.

== Critical reception ==
Professional ratings
Review scores
Source	Rating
Pulse Nigeria	7.7/10

EZIOKWU received generally positive reviews from music critics. In a review for Pulse Nigeria, Adeayo Adebiyi said: “As an album, 'Eziokwu' is a compilation that captures Odumodublvck's recent success in the mainstream. While this is by no means his strongest body of work yet, the album needs to be examined for what it is; a compilation of tracks to service his early listeners as well as the newfound audience while preparing them for the beginning of his mainstream journey.” In a review for The Native, Dennis Ade Peter said “‘EZIOKWU’ is a proper encapsulation of what it means to believe in your own sauce, beyond the sake of hubris. He's worked hard and smart to get to this point, and he's relishing the spoils of success with an invigorated edge. The raps pound the earth and the melodies waft to the skies; the music is vibrant and varied, and the features are roundly brilliant. Most importantly, ODUMODUBLVCK is in total control while toggling his voice between aggressive rapper and melody bender. Talk about a man who can do both. In its assuredness, ‘EZIOKWU’ is a show of musical excellence.”

== Commercial performance ==
EZIOKWU debuted at number 1 in Nigeria Top 50 Albums, with 8,130 equivalent album units; with 12.2 million on-demand streaming activity on the week of 6 October to 12 October.

== Track listing ==
EZIOKWU standard edition
No.	Title	Writer(s)	Producer(s)	Length
1.	"COMMEND"	Tochukwu	Spykida; Sholz	2:28
2.	"DECLAN RICE"	Tochukwu; Agu Uchechukwu James; Awe Babalola; David Utibe-Abasi Okuku; John Olisemeke Uwaishe	Trill Xoe; JohnWav	2:04
3.	"KUBOLOR"	Tochukwu; Ama Serwah Genfi	Trill Xoe; JohnWav	2:09
4.	"ADAMMA BEKE" (featuring Amaarae)	Tochukwu	Ucee	2:14
5.	"SHOOT AND GO HOME"	Tochukwu	Bigfootinyourface	2:52
6.	"TESLA BOY" (featuring Blaqbonez)	Tochukwu; Emeka Akumefule	Spykida	3:05
7.	"MC OLUOMO"	Tochukwu	Cross YDC	1:47
8.	"BLOOD ON THE DANCE FLOOR" (featuring Bloody Civilian and Wale)	Tochukwu; Emoseh Khamofu; Olubowale Victor Akintimehin; Jimohsoundz; Deepaholiq	Jimohsoundz; Deepaholiq	3:53
9.	"FIREGUN" (featuring Fireboy DML)	Tochukwu; Adedamola Oyinlola Adefolahan	Twitchpapiii; Trill Xoe; JohnWav	3:14
10.	"SAINT OBI" (featuring Reeplay)	Tochukwu; Reeplay	IceBeatzz	2:34
11.	"STRIPPERS ANTHEM" (featuring Teezee, and PsychoYP)	Tochukwu; Teni Zaccheaus JR.; Nicholas Ihua-Maduenyi	Ucee; Mo. Sounds; Teezee	2:50
12.	"DOG EAT DOG II" (featuring Cruel Santino, and Bella Shmurda)	Tochukwu; Osayaba Andrew Ize-Iyamu; Abiola Ahmed Akinbiyi	Ucee	4:00
13.	"HAMMER TIME"	Tochukwu	Ucee	2:17
14.	"PICANTO" (featuring Zlatan, and ECko Miles)	Tochukwu; Omoniyi Temidayo Raphael; Edison Ogums	Jimohsoundz	3:04
Total length:				38:31

=== EZIOKWU (Uncut) ===
Deluxe edition
No.	Title	Writer(s)	Producer(s)	Length
15.	"ABUJA PEOPLE" (featuring Decosuave)	Tochukwu; Decosuave	Oshow Daviz	2:40
16.	"HOTEL LOBBY" (featuring Anti World Gangstars)	Tochukwu; Reeplay; Agunna; Shagba; EKIZZY; Deco Suave; XL spiff	Gothicissues; Cross YDC	3:27
17.	"BADMAN BOUNCE" (featuring Reeplay & Duncan Mighty)	Tochukwu; Reeplay; Duncan Mighty	Mr Brxlliant; Spykida	3:46
18.	"MINIMAL FUSS" (featuring BOJ)	Tochukwu; Bolaji Odojukan	Abel Lead Us; Jimohsoundz; Ucee	2:56
19.	"A1 PERICO" (featuring Mizzle & Nasty C)	Tochukwu; Anifowoshe Temitayo Michael; David Junior Ngcobo	Buci Buci; Spykida	3:29
20.	"NO PROTOCOL" (featuring Masicka & Teni)	Tochukwu; Javaun Fearon; Teniola Apata	Wizical; Emrld	3:14
21.	"WOTOWOTO SEASONING" (featuring Black Sherif)	Tochukwu; Mohammed Ismail Sherif	Gothic Issues; Cross YDC; Spykida	2:51
Total length:				01:00:44

== Charts ==
Chart performance for EZIOKWU
Chart (2023)	Peak position
Nigeria Albums (TurnTable)	1
