= Wani (singer) =

WANI
- Also known as: Wani Wonder
- Born: Ayorinde Olawani Ayokun; Washington DC, U.S.
- Genres: R&B; pop; alté; afropop
- Occupations: Singer; songwriter
- Years active: 2017–present
- Label: All Season

Ayo Ayoku better known by his stage name Wani, is an American-Nigerian alté musician. In 2018, he came into the music scene with a widely acclaimed EP Lagos City Vice, with lead song "China Designer", a remake of Tekno's "Be", which became controversial in September 2019, after Sarz called him out, for his royalty, following the success of the song, reaching 1 million streams in July 2019.

== Early life ==
Ayo Ayoku was born in Washington, DC and spent his early years in London, before relocating to Lagos. He began his music career as an audio engineer in Chicago, where he worked as an engineer for various artists. In an interview with Clash magazine author Shahzaib, he said "I came back to Lagos with 500 dollars in my pocket and five songs that would later turn into 'Lagos City Vice'".

== Career ==
In 2017, he launched his music career on SoundCloud, with a cover version of Drake's "Blem", which went viral on Twitter. Shortly after he relocated to Nigeria, he went on to release Lagos City Vice EP, on 4 May 2018. In review for The Native, Debola Abimbolu said "Lagos City Vice is the truest mark of Afropop 2.0". The project spawned the hit track "China Designer", which reached 1 million streams on Apple Music in July 2019. On 5 July 2019, he released the music video of "China Designer", directed by Xamani.

In 2018, he opened for Skepta, and Wizkid at the Nativeland concert. On 25 January 2019, "China Designer" was on the soundtrack list of Skinny Girl in Transit Season 5, Episode 12. In 2019, he opened for Wande Coal, at Gidi Culture Festival. On 29 November 2019, he released "No Love" featuring Prettyboy D-O, and "Fast Life" featuring Minz. On 24 April 2020, he appeared on DRB LasGidi's album Pioneers on the song "I Swear". According to The Native, "He steals the entire show with his reflective lyrics and impressive vocals, where he gives us a lesson on the importance of vulnerability and resilience".

On 24 September 2020, he released "All My Ladies", produced by Adey. According to Soundcity TV, "All My Ladies is an eclectic mid-tempo bop, that takes listeners on a journey through musical history". In 2020, he signed a distribution deal, with Apple Music's Platoon. On 23 July 2021, he released "Times Two (X2)", featuring Buju, as the first lead single off Lagos City Vice 2, extended play. The music video, was released same day on Apple Music, directed by Onari for Pressars Collective, and shot in Lagos, Nigeria. On 4 November 2021, he released "Jailer", as the second lead single off Lagos City Vice 2, extended play.

On 19 November 2021, he released his most anticipated extended play Lagos City Vice 2, independently through Apple Music's Platoon, with guest appearances from BUJU, Prettyboy D-O, and Show Dem Camp. The ep was executively produced by WANI (credited as Ayo Ayoku), Dipo Sadipe and Tobi Akinkunmi, the Marketing and Communications Manager of Universal Music Nigeria with additional production from Trill Xoe, Adey, Bizzouch, Steph, Ransom Beatz, Wonda Magik, and Higo. The PGM radio show, included the project in their list of Top 21 albums of 2021. Precious Williams, who reviewed the album for the list, wrote "Wani is transparent with his journey as he navigates the life of an independent artist and the vices of Lagos city". On 2 December 2021, Wani shared his playlist with The Native, titled Road to LCV2, powered by Platoon, the Apple Music playlist, features songs from Aṣa, Gyptian, Angélique Kidjo, Stonebwoy, Burna Boy, Outkast, Prettyboy D-O, Mooski, Craig David, Skillibeng, The Remedies, Serani, and Santana.

== Controversy ==
On 17 February 2020, a fan tweeted his song "Fast Life", and another described Wani, as the new school Iyanya, to which he responded with a tweet "God Forbid", and became a controversial topic on Twitter. On 31 December 2020, Wani tweeted "I don't want to end the year without saying this, Iyanya I apologize for my comment earlier this year".

== Discography ==
=== Extended plays ===
List of extended plays with selected details
Title	EP details
Lagos City Vice	Released: 4 May 2018; Formats: Digital download, streaming
Lagos City Vice 2	Released: 19 November 2021; Formats: Digital download, streaming

=== Singles ===
List of singles, with year released and album shown
Title	Year	Certifications	Album
"Instaman"	2017		Non-album singles
"Blem"	2017		Non-album singles
"Raining"	2017		Non-album singles
"In2u	2018		Non-album singles
"Fast Life"	2019		Non-album singles
"No Love"	2019		Non-album singles
"All My Ladies"	2019		Non-album singles
"Times Two (X2)" (featuring BUJU)	2021		Lagos City Vice 2
"Jailer"	2021		Lagos City Vice 2
"Silver Spoon Interlude	2022		TBA
"Jezebel"	2022		TBA

=== As featured artist ===
List of singles, with year released, certifications, and album name shown
Title	Year	Certifications	Album
"In Case" (Show Dem Camp featuring WANI)	2019		The Palmwine Express
"Better Days" (Odunsi (The Engine) featuring WANI)	2019		Non-album singles
"Company" (Higo, & HVRRY featuring BUJU & WANI)	2020		TBA
"Issues" (Higo, & HVRRY featuring Minz & WANI)	2020		TBA
"Electra" (chuXchu featuring WANI)	2020		TBA
"Mentally" (Prettyboy D-O featuring WANI)	2020		Wildfire
"I Swear" (DRB LasGidi featuring Teezee, BOJ, Fresh L & WANI)	2020		Pioneers
"Bad" (SGaWD featuring WANI)	2021		Class of '21
