= Seni Saraki =

Nigerian music executive

- Born: Oluwaseni Saraki
- Occupation: Music executive
- Years active: 2013–present
- Known for: The NATIVE Networks
- Title: Record label executive
- Parents: Bukola Saraki (father); Toyin Saraki (mother)
- Relatives: Halimat Oluwatosin Saraki (Sister)
- Musical career
- Genres: Alté; Hip-Hop; Afrofusion
- Instrument: Vocals
- Labels: NATIVE Records; Def Jam

Seni Saraki (born Oluwaseni Saraki) also known as Shane Chubbz, is a Nigerian music executive, executive producer, and sports executive. He currently serves as the Chairman of Abubakar Bukola Saraki Football Club, and co-president of NATIVE Records. In 2016, Seni 'Chubbz' Saraki co-founded the media and entertainment company The NATIVE Networks, with Teezee, and Sholz. (Note: First public announcement of The NATIVE Networks in 2022)

== Early life ==
Oluwaseni Saraki was born in 1996 to Toyin Saraki, and Bukola Saraki, who served as the 13th President of the Nigerian Senate. He graduated from the London School of Economics, in England and also obtained a law degree, from the Nigerian Law School in 2017. He had his NYSC in 2018 at Abuja.

== Career ==
In 2013, he launched his career as a rapper with the stage name Shane Chubbz. On 10 September 2013, he released "Holiday / Where I'm from", featuring DAP The Contract (as DAP), and Stan. In 2014, he released his extended play Chubbziano, featuring guest appearances from DAP The Contract, Mick Jenkins, Uzzee, Phlowz, and Teezee.

=== ABS F.C. ===
We made Native because we wanted to tell the stories about the cool creatives pushing boundaries that everybody outside Nigeria was noticing but weren't getting covered at home

— Seni Saraki and Teezee speaking to The FADER

In 2015, Seni was appointed the Chairman of Abubakar Bukola Saraki F.C.. by his Dad In his first season, the team returned to the Nigeria Professional Football League in 2016 since his father purchased the club. In 2017, he was instrumental in the partnership between the club and Puma, which involved Puma supplying football kits and sponsoring the club activities.

=== Black Panther: Wakanda Forever ===
On 25 July 2022, Seni and Ludwig Göransson, executively produced the soundtrack EP Wakanda Forever Prologue. On 4 November 2022, he served as one of the executive producers on Black Panther: Wakanda Forever soundtrack album. At the 66th Grammy, he earned a special recognition from The Recording Academy for his contribution on Wakanda Forever.

On 28 February 2023, Marvel Studios released a three-episode mini-documentary titled "Voices Rising: The Music of Wakanda Forever" on Disney+, On the documentary, Seni spoke about organizing the live sessions and artist sessions, as well as co-producing the soundtrack in Lagos, Nigeria.

=== Wizkid: Long Live Lagos ===
On 6 June 2025, he co-produced and starred in Wizkid's documentary titled Wizkid: Long Live Lagos.

== NATIVE Networks ==
In 2016, Seni ventured into media and entertainment business and founded NATIVE Networks, a media and entertainment company which serves as the parent company of The Native, and it's known as the organizer of Nativeland, an annual music festival in Nigeria. In 2019, The Native partnered with Nike to launch The NATIVE's limited edition jersey designed by Seni. In 2022, Seni's NATIVE Networks went into a joint venture partnership with the multinational label Def Jam Recordings to establish NATIVE Records, a Nigerian record label with the sole aim to sign and develop talents in Africa and its diaspora.

== Selected publications ==
- Davido Vs. The World (2018).
- Odunsi the Engine: The Dark Prince of Afro-Pop (2019).
- Naira Marley Inside Life (2020).
- Damson Idris, The Connect (2021).
- Elsa's World (2021).
- Asake's time (2022).
- Rema: Still Divine (2022).
- How Davido got his voice back (2023).
- How Adekunle Gold Met Tio Tequila (2023).

== Awards and recognition ==
Year	Event	Prize	Nominated work	Result	Ref
2023	TurnTable Music Awards	Outstanding Achievement in Music in Film	Himself for Black Panther: Wakanda Forever	Won	
2024	Grammy Awards	Special Recognition	Himself for Black Panther: Wakanda Forever	Nominated	
2025	Grammy Awards	Special Recognition	Himself for Bob Marley: One Love – Music Inspired By The Film (Deluxe)	Won	

Recognition

In 2019, Chude Jideonwo listed Seni as one of his 150 most interesting people in the culture. In 2022, TurnTable listed Seni as one of its Top 30 Music Executives In Nigeria. On 23 November 2022, Seni was named Executive of the Week by TurnTable, following the global success of Black Panther: Wakanda Forever soundtrack album. The Culture Custodian named him as one of the 24 Nigerian Music Business Executives that owned 2022. In 2023, TurnTable listed Seni as one of its Top 30 Music Executives In Nigeria.
