= Native Sound System =

British radio show

- Genre: Talk, Alté
- Country of origin: United Kingdom
- Home station: NTS Radio
- Starring: Sholz Addy Edgal
- Created by: The Native
- Original release: 2017

Native Sound System is a British radio show, based in London, and hosted by Sholz. It currently airs every Friday at 5PM, on NTS Radio. The show showcase up and coming African music talents, with the aim to document African culture. In 2020, the show relaunch on NTS Radio. On 13 December 2021, The Native launched Native Sound Radio on No Signal's radio.

== History ==
Native Sound System was established in 2017 by The Native. On 23 April 2021, Cloud X festival partnered with Native Sound System to co-curate its line-up. In the same year, DJ Obi, and Native Sound System DJ's, entertained the audience with live DJ sets at the 4th Our Homecoming festival. On 8 April 2022, Native Sound System released "Runaway" featuring Lojay & Ayra Starr.

On 22 December 2021, Native Sound System hosted the fifth edition of Nativeland, titled NATIV5 at Harbour Point Marquee, in Victoria Island, Lagos. To celebrate the fifth anniversary of The Native. The event was headlined by Rema, Amaarae, Styl-Plus, Teezee, SGaWD, and Lojay, with guess performances from, Odunsi, Ayra Starr, Tems, Wale Davies, and Ladipoe.

On 8 July 2022, NSS and Wani released "Wedding Ring", featuring Odunsi (The Engine), Odeal, and BOJ. The song was produced by 44DB, with additional production from DJ Sholz, and Ginton. On 5 September 2022, Native Sound System, premiered the official visual for "Weeding Ring", directed by Emmanuelle Loca-Gisquet and co-directed by Asia Ahmad. On 18 August 2022, NSS released the Nativeworld LP, through Native Records, an independent label owned by The Native.

On 28 August 2022, NSS members and The Native founders covered the Guardian Life Magazine issue titled Building a Sonic World for Artistic Freedom. They discussed their journey, an Alté, being the new mainstream sound, and their support to the community, with Life Magazine author Chinonso Ihekire.

== See also ==
- The Native
- Nativeland
