= Billar Stoner =

Nigerian rapper (born 1996)

- Also known as: BBWay
- Born: Dickson Imafidion Andrew; 29 November 1996 (age 29); Edo State, Nigeria
- Genres: Alternative hip hop; alté; afropop; afroswing; trap; drill
- Occupations: Rapper; singer; songwriter
- Years active: 2024–present
- Label: BSG Worldwide

Dickson Imafidion Andrew (born 29 November 1996), known professionally as Billar Stoner, is a Nigerian alternative hip hop rapper, singer, and songwriter whose rise to prominence began in 2024 after ranking 10 on TurnTable NXT Emerging Top Artistes chart for ten consecutive weeks. He gained wider recognition in 2025 with the release of the single "Pressure" which earned his first entry on Nigeria's TurnTable Top 50 single chart, in December 2025, he was listed among Audiomack’s top 10 trending Nigerian emerging artistes across all genres and was named in Vanguard’s “Fresh Frontiers” artists shaping the sound of 2025.

== Early life ==
Billar Stoner was born Dickson Imafidion Andrew and is of Esan North East, Ubiaja Local Government Area, Edo State origin, though he was born and raised in Lagos, Nigeria. He began pursuing music around 2020, drawing inspiration from both hip-hop and Afrobeats traditions and using songwriting to reflect personal struggles, resilience, and lived experience.

== Career ==
On October 29, 2025, Billar released his single titled "Pressure" which earned him his first chart entry on Nigeria's TurnTable Top 50 single chart. On December 16, 2025, he released "In My Mind" a second single off his debut project. That same month, he was ranked among the top 10 trending Nigerian emerging artistes on Audiomack across all genres. On 18 December 2025, Vanguard’s listed him on “Fresh Frontiers” list of artists shaping the sound of 2025. On 14 January 2026, Stoner released his debut EP, Made for You, the five-track project which NotJustOk describes as reflection on growth, responsibility, and the conscious decision to end cycles of hardship. In May 2026, he was ranked at number 10 on TurnTable's NXT Emerging Top Artistes for 10 weeks.

== Discography ==
=== EP ===
- Made For You (2026)

=== Single ===
- Word On The Street (2023)
- Never Lie (2024)
- I Ain’t Gon Die (2024)
- Pressure (2025)
- In My Mind (2025)

== See also ==
- List of Nigerian musicians
