= Nativeland =

Nigerian music festival

- NATIVELAND trademark
- Status: Active
- Genre: Various
- Date: 22 December
- Frequency: Annual
- Location: Lagos
- Country: Nigeria
- Years active: 2016–present
- Organiser: The Native
- Website: NATIVELAND

NATIVELAND is an annual music festival in Lagos, Nigeria, and organized by The Native. The platform was established to bring together the best of pop culture, music, art, food, style, sports, and education in the Nigerian entertainment industry. In 2020, Billboard Magazine named NATIVELAND as one of The Gatekeepers of the Nigerian music industry.

== History ==
NATIVELAND is produced and organized by The Native. It was created to bring together the best of pop culture, music, art, food, style, sports, and education in the Nigerian entertainment industry. The event is held annually at Muri Okunola Park, in Lagos.

=== 2016: First edition ===
On 22 December 2016, the first edition was held and powered by Ndani TV. The concert was headlined by Skepta, and Burna Boy and featured guest performances from, Ycee, Ajebutter 22, Maleek Berry, Fresh L, DAP The Contract, Odunsi (The Engine), Cruel Santino, and Lady Donli. At the first edition, the music group DRB LasGidi, united on stage.

=== 2017: Second edition ===
On 22 December 2017, the second edition was held, and headlined by Kojo Funds, Davido, Nonso Amadi, Maleek Berry, Burna Boy, Tekno, Not3s, Mayorkun and Yxng Bane, with guess performances from, Fasina, Fresh L, Mobblanta, No Politics Mob, Kazeem Twins, Yinka Bernie, AYLØ, Lady Donli, Barelyanyhook, Dice Ailes, Ladipoe, Prettyboy D-O, DJ Aye, Wavy The Creator, Odunsi, Blackmagic, Santi, Ajebutter22, BOJ, and SDC.

=== 2018: Third edition ===
The third edition was held with Odunsi, PrettyBoy D-O, and Santi as special guests, with additional performances from Wande Coal, Runtown, Sababii, Falana, and Teni.

=== 2019: Fourth edition ===
At the fourth edition, the festival added a day for panels titled NATIVE HOUSE, which invited music industry insiders from various sects and artists from Nigeria and the African Diaspora. To discuss topics ranging from the migration of contemporary African music, visual art, and the international music interest in African music. The festival feature guess performs from Naira Marley, Santi, Rema, Lady Donli, Tems, Joeboy, Fireboy DML, Buju, Gigi Atlantis, SOMADINA, Cuppy, Maison 2500, DJ Femo and more. With additional music provided by NATIVE Sound System resident DJs Bristar and Vvada. Burna Boy and Koffee did not perform, due to the security at the VIP entrance was breached by fans.

=== 2021: Fifth edition ===
On 22 December 2021, NSS hosted the fifth edition of NATIVELAND, titled NATIV5 at Harbour Point Marquee. To celebrate the fifth anniversary of The Native. The music concert was headlined by Rema, Amaarae, Styl-Plus, Teezee, SGaWD, and Lojay, with guess performances from, Odunsi, Ayra Starr, Tems, Wale Davies, and Ladipoe.

== Controversy ==
Nativeland Festival has faced a recurring issue with stage collapses, with incidents reported in both 2019 and 2024. These collapses occurred during live performances, resulting in property damage and posing serious threats to safety. The aftermath included an official statement from Nativeland and a wave of critical tweets from fans expressing their dissatisfaction.

== See also ==
- The Native
- NATIVE Sound System
- NATIVE Sound Radio
