= Teezee =

Nigerian record executive

TeeZee
- Born: Teni Zaccheaus Jr. 28 June 1990 (age 36); Lagos
- Other name: Teniola Zaccheaus
- Occupations: Rapper; singer; songwriter; record executive
- Years active: 2007–present
- Known for: The NATIVE Networks
- Title: Record executive
- Partner: Grace Ladoja
- Parents: Teni Zaccheaus Sr. (father); Yewande Zaccheaus (mother)
- Relatives: Iretidayo Zaccheaus (Sister)
- Musical career
- Genres: Alté; Hip-Hop; Afrofusion
- Instrument: Vocals
- Labels: NATIVE Records; Def Jam
- Member of: DRB LasGidi (2007–present)

Teniola Zaccheaus Jr. (born 28 June 1990), better known by his stage name Teezee (stylized as TeeZee), is an English-Nigerian rapper, singer, songwriter, and record executive. He is one-third of the musical group DRB LasGidi, alongside BOJ and Fresh L. He serves as the co-president of NATIVE Records and co-founder of The NATIVE Networks, whose subsidiaries include The Native, and NATIVE Records. He is best known as a pioneer of alté, and credited for the crossover success of Odumodublvck's single "Declan Rice".

== Early life and education ==
Teniola Zaccheaus Jr. was born in Lagos, Nigeria, and raised between London, England, and Lagos, Nigeria. In year 9 (JSS 3), Teni began making music while still schooling at Malvern College, in Malvern, Worcestershire, England, with BOJ and Fresh L. In conversation with The Crack Magazine author Rob Dozier on 9 March 2022, he credited his father, Teni Zaccheaus Sr., for his music education while growing up. His father ran nightclubs in Lagos during his childhood, which meant that he had to stay on top of what was popular on the radio.

== Career ==
Teezee joined the group DRB LasGidi in 2007 with his school friends BOJ and Fresh L. He also went by Teniola Zacchaeus, at the early stage of his career, and he is fondly called the Fresh Prince of LasGidi coined from his debut studio album Fresh Prince of LasGidi in 2013. He is regarded as one of Nigeria's first generations of self-publishing artists, alongside BOJ and Fresh L, to take advantage of the internet services by sharing their music on YouTube and SoundCloud.

On 3 March 2020, Eventful CEO Yewande Zaccheaus appointed Teezee as Marketing Executive and Creative Consultant for Eventful and Harbour Point Event Centre, both in Lagos. On 30 July 2021, he appeared on Skepta sophomore extended play All In on track 2 "Peace of Mind" with American rapper Kid Cudi. On 11 November 2021, he released "BADI" featuring Davido as the lead single from his debut studio album Arrested by Love, with the accompanying music video inspired by 2000s Nollywood classics.

On 17 December 2021, he released "NEW GOVERNMENT" featuring Prettyboy D-O and Kofi Mole, as the second lead single from Arrested by Love. On 4 February 2022, he released "NOK'D" featuring Deto Black, as the third single from Arrested by Love, with the accompanying music video directed by Chukwuka Nwobi and Sanjo Omosa. On 18 February 2022, he released his first solo studio album titled Arrested by Love, with guest appearances from Davido, Prettyboy D-O, Kofi Mole, Midas the Jagaban, DETO BLACK, Pa Salieu, Lancey Foux, BACKROAD GEE, and Teni. On 9 September 2022, Jameson Irish Whiskey unveils a limited edition bottle to celebrate his album Arrested by Love. On 6 October 2023, following the release of Odumodublvck's fifth mixtape studio album EZIOKWU, Teezee served as the co-exclusive producer alongside Odumodu.

=== Endorsements ===
In 2017, Teezee signed a brand ambassador deal with Jameson Irish Whiskey in Nigeria.

== The NATIVE Networks ==
=== The Native ===
In 2016, NATIVE Networks established The Native, a music magazine with the aim to promote alté craft. In a conversation with Patta, a clothing label in Amsterdam; Teezee and Seni Saraki said: “We made Native because we wanted to tell the stories about the cool creatives pushing boundaries that everybody outside Nigeria was noticing but weren’t getting covered at home”, pointing to the lack of media attention the alté music genre received during its early stages.

=== NATIVE records ===
On 20 September 2022, Teezee alongside Chubbziano, and Sholz co-founded NATIVE Records, through NATIVE Networks as a joint venture partnership with the multinational label Def Jam Recordings, with the sole aim to sign and develop talents in Africa and its diaspora. On 23 November 2022, he announced the signing of its first recording NATIVE act Odumodublvck. On 8 December 2022, Teezee released his first single under his label, titled "Manhattan" featuring Cruel Santino, with production from GMK.

== Personal life ==
Teezee is the brother of Nigerian fashion entrepreneur Iretidayo Zaccheaus. In 2021, Teezee and his partner, British music executive Grace Ladoja, announced the birth of their first child.

== Awards and recognition ==
In 2019, Chude Jideonwo listed Teezee as one of his 150 most interesting people in the culture. In 2021, YNaija listed Teezee as one of the 100 Most Influential People in Media. On 12 April 2023, Teezee was named Executive of the Week by TurnTable, following the crossover success of Odumodublvck into the mainstream, as the first Nigerian rapper to have two top songs on the weekly TurnTable Top Hip-Hop/Rap Songs with "Picanto" and "Declan Rice" breaking into TurnTable Official Nigeria Top 100 chart.

Year	Event	Prize	Result	Ref
2023	Scream All Youth Awards	Music Executive	Nominated	

== Concerts ==
- Nativeland (2016)
- Afropolitan Vibes (2018)
- Palmwine Music Festival (2021)
- Our Homecoming (2022)
- Places+Faces Lisbon Weekender (2022)
