= GMK (producer) =

Nigerian record producer

- Born: Abdulqudus King
- Education: SAE Institute London
- Occupations: Record producer; rapper; singer; songwriter; sound engineer
- Parents: Kolawole King (father); Carol King (mother)
- Relatives: Ikemefuna Nsolo (Half-Brother); Oluwasoladegbin King (Sister)
- Musical career
- Origin: Nigeria
- Genres: Alté; Afro-fusion; Hip hop
- Years active: 2016–present
- Labels: Monster Boy; Warner Music; Love Renaissance (LVRN)

Abdulqudus King, better known as GMK, is a Nigerian record producer, sound engineer, rapper, songwriter singer and songwriter. He is best known for producing Bridge's "Needy", and "Searching", Cruel Santino's "Gangsta Fear", Lady Donli's "Cash", BOJ's "Awolowo", "Bill Up", and "Assignment", and Burna Boy's "Different". The Grammy-nominated Best World Music Album African Giant by Burna Boy in 2019, earned him a special recognition from The Recording Academy. He is signed to Warner Chappell Music, and Love Renaissance.

He is a member of the Monster Boys collective, with Cruel Santino, and music producers Genio Bambino.

== Early life ==
He studied Audio Engineering in the United Kingdom at the SAE Institute London.

== Career ==
GMK is an acronym for "Grand Master King". In 2013, he launched his career on SoundCloud, as a rapper, following the release of "Sounds Of The Future", featuring Cruel Santino (credited as Ozzy B) & Yung from the music group L.O.S. On 24 April 2016, he released his extended play Long Live the King, exclusively on SoundCloud, with guest appearances from Odunsi (The Engine), Genio Bambino, Bridge, BrisB, and Cruel Santino. In a review for Pulse Nigeria, Abiola wrote "Long Live The King is a pleasing story-telling work of art by ThatBoyGMK that would leave you wanting more". The Culture Custodian included the extended play in their list of 10 debut projects from 2016 you should bump!, in 2017.

On 16 December 2016, he released "WasteMan", independently on SoundCloud. The music video was released the same day, and directed by Falomo, in Lagos, Nigeria. On 9 February 2017, The Native included the song in their Bumplist of 10 essentials you must-haves this week. On 21 March 2017, GMK released "Coconut lips", featuring Tomi Thomas. On 24 May 2017, he released "Pears & Mangos", and released "OTB", on 23 July 2017. In the same year, he opened for Cruel Santino, and Wavy the Creator, at The Lucid Lemons Curd 2 music and art showcase, held in Lagos, on August 5, 2017. He released "Lagbaja" featuring Odunsi (The Engine), on 20 November 2017.

GMK was on YNaija New Establishment class of 2019. The music video for Odunsi "Star Signs" was directed by The Candles, with cameo appearances from GMK. On 17 February 2021, following the partnership between Warner Chappell Music, and Love Renaissance, Monster Boys collective signed a publishing deal with Warner Chappell Music.

== Personal life ==
Quddus King is the son of Kolawole King and the Nigerian actress Carol King.

== Discography ==
=== Extended plays ===
List of EPs, with release date and label shown
Title	EP details
Long Live the King	Released: 24 April 2016; Formats: Digital download, streaming

== Production discography ==
=== Albums produced ===
Artist	Album	Release date	Certifications	Label	Note
Cruel Santino	Suzie’s Funeral	1 July 2016		Immaculate Taste	Sound Engineer; Co-Producer
Cruel Santino	Mandy & The Jungle	17 May 2019		Monster Boy	Sound Engineer; Co-Producer
Cruel Santino	Subaru Boys : FINAL HEAVEN	3 March 2022		Interscope Records	Sound Engineer; Co-Producer
M.I Abaga	Rendezvous	9 February 2018		Chocolate City	Sound Engineer
M.I Abaga	A Study on Self Worth: Yxng Dxnzl	24 August 2018		Chocolate City	Co-producer
Odunsi (The Engine)	Time Of Our Lives	2 August 2016			Sound Engineer
Odunsi (The Engine)	rare.	12 October 2018		Kimani Moore Entertainment	Executive producer; Sound Engineer
Burna Boy	African Giant	26 July 2019	BPI: Silver	Spaceship / Atlantic / WMG	Co-producer
Lady Donli	Enjoy Your Life	9 August 2019		Makiyayi	Co-producer
Lady Donli	W I L D	30 July 2021		Bad Moon	Co-producer
DRB LasGidi	Pioneers	24 April 2020		Zero Label Records	Co-producer

== Accolades ==
Year	Award ceremony	Prize	Recipient/Nominated work	Result	Ref
2020	Grammy Awards	Special Recognition	Himself for African Giant	Nominated	
