= Aylø =

Nigerian musician (born 1994)

AYLØ
- Born: Elomaina Mafeni; 30 September 1994 (age 31); Benin City-Edo State
- Origin: Nigerian
- Genres: Soul; R&B; Hip hop; alté
- Occupations: Singer; Songwriter; Producer
- Years active: 2017–present
- Labels: The Soul Headquarters; Soulection; PLATOON

Elomaina Mafeni (born 30 September 1994), known professionally as Aylø, is a Nigerian neo-soul, and alternative R&B singer, songwriter, and music producer. He came into the music scene with an acclaimed mixtape album Insert Project Name, with lead track "wys?", featuring Cruel Santino. The accompanying music video for "wys?", was released on 26 May 2018, in collaboration with Samsung Nigeria, and HelaBase.

== Life and career ==
Aylø was born in 1994 in Benin City, the capital of Edo State. He credited his parents for his early music education. He attended the prestigious Loyola Jesuit College. He tells Nataal Magazine, "I grew up listening to my mother's gospel and my father's jazz collections, as well as rap and soul music from my uncles." However, he cited Fela Kuti, DMX, Andre 3000, Whitney Houston, Sade, and Herbie Hancock, as his early musical influence, and was led to start making music, after he heard J. Cole’s music. He tells Nataal Magazine culture, and music writer Eric Otieno.

Aylø who launched his career on SoundCloud, was first introduced into the music scene, through Odunsi's record "Situationship", which pushed him into the alté mainstream in 2016. The single "Situationship", peaked at number 5 on U.S Spotify Viral 50 on Billboard, and debut at number 1 on the SoundCloud "New & Hot" R&B & Soul chart. On 23 December 2016, he released Honest Conversations EP exclusively on SoundCloud, which spawned hit track "Island Girl". An alté song which features guess vocals from Odunsi (The Enegine), and Zamir. On 4 January 2017, Culture Custodian listed Honest Conversations EP on its list of 10 debut projects from 2016 you should bump! in 2017.

On 15 May 2017, Honest Conversations EP was commercially released independently on streaming platforms. On 22 September 2017, he released Insert Project Name. The project spawned various hit tracks, including "wys?", featuring Cruel Santino, and "Gardens" featuring Chris Generalz, and Tau Benah. The project also features guest appearance from Amaarae, Hamzaa, and Odunsi (The Engine). On 22 December 2017, he opened for Yxng Bane, Kojo Funds, Davido, Skepta, and Burna Boy at the Nativeland. In June 2018, he released "Still ll", and "Litt!", and feature a guest vocal from Tay Iwar; with music production from Le Mav. On 8 July 2018, he released the music video for "Still II".

On 13 April 2019, "Wys?", and "Gardens" from Insert Project Name, mixtape album was aired on Soulection radio. On 13 June 2019, he released "Paris!", as the first lead single off dnt'dlt, mixtape album. On 20 June 2019, "Paris!" music video was premiered first on The Fader's magazine. and was made available commercially the next day being 21 June, for YouTube streaming. On 11 July 2019, he released "Sassy", featuring Fasina, and PsychoYP, as the second lead single off dnt'dlt, mixtape album. On 2 August 2019, he released dnt'dlt mixtape, independently through Apple Music's Platoon, with guest appearances from Cheso, Myquale, Fasina, PsychoYP, MoJo AF and SugarBana.

dnt'dlt is an abbreviation for "don’t delete". Reviewing for Pulse Nigeria, Motolani Alake said the project mostly seemed authentic and relatable experiences of youth. He rated the project 7/8, meaning Victory in the scale of Pulse Nigeria. On 28 April 2020, he premiered "THIS SH!T", featuring Lmbskn on The Fader Magazine. On 1 May 2020, he commercially released "THIS SH!T" on streaming platforms. On 8 October 2020, Aylø unveiled his publishing and distribution deal with Soulection, with the release of "Romantic", as the second lead single off his debut EP - Clairentience. On 16 October 2020, "Romantic" was cited on OkayAfrica Heat Of The Week, among 8 other songs.

On 17 October 2021, "Romantic" from Clairentience, extended play was aired on Soulection radio. On 10 December 2020, he released his debut extended play Clairsentience, independently through Soulection, with guest appearances from Lordkez (stylized as lordkez), LMBSKN, and Suté Iwar. On 26 March 2021, he release "Clairsentience LIVE", a collective of three live singles from Clairsentience extended play, under Soulection. On 6 November 2021, he was on the line-up of ART X Live!, with Lojay, Dami Oniru, BigFoot and Pheelz. On 4 February 2022, Ronehi, and Aylø released "Saudade", through Outer South. On 12 February 2022, "Saudade" was aired on Soulection Radio.

On 24 June 2022, following the release of the Nigerian movie Glamour Girls, a sequel to the 1994 classic. The movie features alté songs on its tracklist curated by Tatenda Terence Kamera. "Still II", "Paris!", and "925" by Aylø were included on the movie soundtrack. On 8 July 2022, he released his most anticipated indie-studio album For Good Reasons, through The Soul Headquarters, with guest appearances from Tena Tenpo, PsychoYP, Zilla Oaks, Tim Lyre, Zirra, Sutra (stylized as SUTRA), and Merry-Lynn.

== Discography ==
=== Albums ===
List of studio albums, with selected chart positions and certifications
Title	Album details
For Good Reasons	Released: 8 July 2022; Label: SOUL HQ; Formats: CD, Digital download

=== EPs ===
List of extended plays, with selected details
Title	Details
Honest Conversations EP	Released: 23 December 2016; Label: Formats: Digital download
ØÜ (with Ayüü)	Released: December 15, 2017; Re-Released: April 11, 2018; Label: ØÜ; Formats : Digital download, streaming
Clairsentience	Released: 10 December 2020; Label: Soulection; Formats: Digital download

List of LIVE extended plays, with selected details
Title	Details
Clairsentience LIVE	Released: 26 March 2021; Label: Soulection; Formats: Digital download

=== Mixtapes ===
List of mixtapes with selected details
Title	Details
Insert Project Name	Released: 22 September 2017; Label: Formats: Digital download
dnt'dlt	Released: 2 August 2019; Label: PLATOON; Formats: Digital download

=== Singles ===
List of singles as lead artist, with selected chart positions and certifications, showing year released and album name
Title	Year	Certifications	Album
"Still II"	2018		Non-album single
"Litt!" (feat. Tay Iwar)	2018		Non-album single
"Paris!"	2019		dnt'dlt
"Sassy" (feat. Fasina & PsychoYP)	2019		dnt'dlt
"THIS SH!T" (feat. LMBSKN)	2020		Non-album single
Romantic	2020		Non-album single
"Saudade" (as. Ronehi & AYLØ)	2022		TBA
