= Bloody Civilian =

Nigerian Singer-songwriter and record producer

- Born: Emoseh Khamofu; July 1999 (age 26–27); Abuja, Nigeria
- Occupations: Singer; songwriter; record producer
- Musical career
- Instrument: Vocals
- Years active: 2022–present
- Label: 0207 Def Jam

Emoseh Khamofu known professionally as Bloody Civilian, is a Nigerian singer, songwriter, and record producer signed to 0207 Def Jam, a UK arm of Def Jam Recordings. She rose to fame after releasing her single "How To Kill A Man" and "Wake Up" featuring Rema. The song was soundtracked in the American 2022 superhero film Black Panther. Her single "Blood on the Dance Floor" with ODUMODUBLVCK, also went viral.

Bloody is profiled by The Guardian Nigeria as among the most radical of emerging mavericks in Nigerian music scene and by NME as an essential emerging artist for 2023. On 9 October 2023, she ranked number 1 on TurnTable's NXT Emerging Top Artistes, and On 6 November 2023, she ranked number 16 on TurnTable's Artiste Top 100 In January 2024, Bloody Civilian was announced to be on the EP for Bob Marley's biopic, One Love.

== Early life ==
Originally from Taraba State, Emoseh grew up in the Northern part of Nigeria, in between Kaduna, Jos and Abuja. She was raised in a conservative environment and was not allowed to move around by her parents. As a teen, Emoseh was known in her school as a kid who could sing and play the guitar because she often involved in school talent shows where she performed original music and people learnt her lyrics. She would go on and started making beats and giving it to rappers at school, gradually Emoseh started working on her own musically and perfecting her production skills in the procedure. Growing up, everyone around Emoseh thought music was a hobby to her including herself, except her dad who wanted her to study music in school. At aged 8, She started writing songs which she often gave to her parents. Emoseh's dad who she said is part of her early music foundations, used to be a musical tourist in a band back in the days. Her name "Bloody Civilian", was inspired by her growing up in the north of Nigeria where there is an abundance of military violence.

== Career ==
Emoseh started as a record producer before embarking fully as a recording artist. Her debut single "How To Kill A Man" was released in 2022, with the video released the same year which was written, shot, produced and directed by her, as the first lead single off her debut extended play Anger Management. The same year, "Wake Up" written and produced by her which featured Nigerian star Rema, an official soundtrack for the Marvel Blockbuster, Black Panther: Wakanda Forever was released.

On 30 March 2023, she released "I Don't Like You", with the official music video released on 13 July 2023, and directed by Cruel Santino. On 6 June 2023, she released "Escapism", as the third single off her debut extended play Anger Management, released on 8 June 2023, independently through Def Jam Recordings. On 9 November 2023, she released "I Don’t Like You" featuring JELEEL! and Candy Bleakz, "Mad Apology" featuring Odumodublvck, and "Escapism" featuring Fave and Tay Iwar, as the lead singles of her extended play Anger Management: At LEasT wE tRIED, a remixed version of Anger Management, released through 0207 Def Jam on 10 November 2023. The remixed project features guest appearances from JELEEL!, Candy Bleakz, Odumodublvck, Fave, Tay Iwar, Joeboy, Majeeed, Enny, Ajebo Hustlers, Miraa May, and Lifesize Teddy.u

== Discography ==
=== Extended plays ===
List of extended plays, with selected details and chart positions
Title	Details	Peak chart positions
Title	Details	NG
Anger Management	Released: 8 June 2023; Label: Formats: Digital download	—
Anger Management: At LEasT wE tRIED	Released: 11 November 2023; Label: 0207 Def Jam; Formats: Digital download	—

=== Singles ===
==== As lead artist ====
List of singles as lead artist, with year released and album shown
Title	Year	Peak chart positions							Certifications	Album
Title	Year	NG	NG Alt./DH.	SA	UK	UK Afrobeats	US	US Afrobeats	Certifications	Album
"How To Kill A Man"	2022	—	—	—	—	—	—	—		Anger Management
"I Don't Like You"	2023	83	1	—	—	—	—	—		Anger Management
"Escapism"	2023	—	—	—	—	—	—	—		Anger Management
"Escapism" (feat. Fave & Tay Iwar)	2023	—	—	—	—	—	—	—		Anger Management: At LEasT wE tRIED
"I Don't Like You" (feat. Jeleel & Candy Bleakz)	2023	—	—	—	—	—	—	—		Anger Management: At LEasT wE tRIED
"Mad Apology" (feat. Odumodublvck)	2023	—	—	—	—	—	—	—		Anger Management: At LEasT wE tRIED

==== As featured artist ====
List of singles as featured artist, with year released, selected chart positions, certifications, and album name shown
Title	Year	Peak chart positions									Certifications	Album
Title	Year	NG	NG Afropop	SA	UK	UK Afrobeats	US	US R&B/HH	US R&B	US Afrobeats	Certifications	Album
"Blood on the Dance Floor" (Odumodublvck feat. Bloody Civilian & Wale)	2023	1	1	—	—	10	—	—	—	18		EZIOKWU

=== Other charted and certified songs ===
List of other charted songs, with year released, selected chart positions, certification and album name shown
Title	Year	Peak chart positions									Certification	Album
Title	Year	NG	NG Alt./DH.	SA	UK	UK Afrobeats	US	US R&B	US R&B/HH	US Afrobeats	Certification	Album
"Mad Apology"	2023	— (Note: "Mad Apology" did not enter Nigeria Top 100, but peaked at number 5 on the Bubbling Under Top 100 chart.)	—	—	—	—	—	—	—	—		Anger Management

== Accolades ==
Year	Awards ceremony	Award description(s)	Nominated work	Results	Ref
2023	The Headies	Rookie of the Year	Herself	Nominated	
