= Bizzle Osikoya =

Nigerian music executive

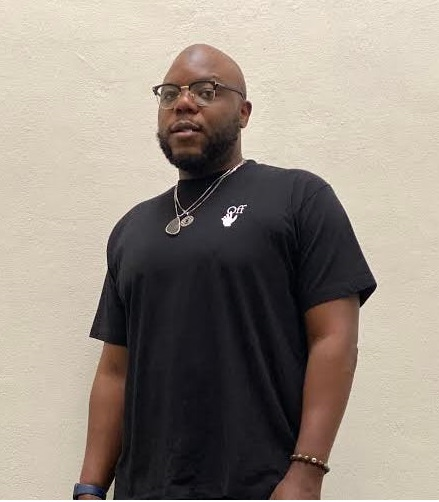
- Born: Abiodun Osikoya
- Education: University of Liverpool; SAE Institute Liverpool; Digital Film Academy
- Occupations: Talent manager; A&R; promoter; record executive; film producer; sound engineer
- Years active: 2010–present
- Known for: Plug Entertainment
- Board member of: The Plug

Abiodun Osikoya, popularly known as Bizzle Osikoya, is a Nigerian record label executive, talent manager, film producer, and sound engineer. He is the co-founder of The Plug (whose subsidiaries include The Plug Entertainment, The Plug Music, and Plug Sports) and The Block Party Series. In June 2022, Bizzle joined the Recording Academy class of 2022, as a professional member.

== Early life ==
Abiodun Osikoya was born in Nigeria and raised between Lagos, London, and Birmingham. He had his primary education in Lagos and his secondary education in Lagos and Birmingham, before proceeding to study Music Business in Liverpool for his tertiary education, where he graduated with a B.Sc. in Music Business from the University of Liverpool, and SAE Institute in Liverpool. His interest led him into studying sound engineering at SAE in Liverpool and film production at Digital Film Academy in New York.

== Career ==
He began his career at Storm 360 Records as Naeto C's road manager, and later joined Mo' Hits Records, where he worked with Wande Coal, Dr SID, Tiwa Savage, and Davido. In 2012, he joined Mavin Records as an A&R, and was responsible for Mavin's compilation album Solar Plexus and Reekado Banks studio album SPOTLIGHT, before he resigned from the label in 2016.

In 2016, he founded B Entertainment, which he later merged with Asa Asika imprint StarGaze Entertainment, to establish The Plug. On 18 December 2016, he lost the prize for New Media, at The Future Awards Africa to Tosin "OloriSuperGal" Ajibade. On 17 December 2022, he joined Nigeria recording chart company TurnTable charts, as one of its executives, alongside Oye Akideinde.

He also served as an A&R executive on Oxlade's debut ep Oxygene and Alpha P's debut EP King of the Wolves. He worked on BOJ and Ajebutter22 collaborative album Make E No Cause Fight 2. Bizzle has also helped launch the careers of many famous Nigerian Afrobeat, Afropop, R&B and alté musicians including Oxlade, Tomi Agape, Alpha P, Vict0ny, and Tems.
