= Ibejii =

British-Nigerian musician

- Born: London, England
- Genres: Alté, afro-soul
- Occupation: Musician
- Years active: 2016–present

Ibejii is a British-Nigerian alternative and afro-soul singer-songwriter, whose fifth studio album, Intermission, won the Best alternative album at the Headies Awards of 2022.

== Early life ==
Born in London, England, and raised between the Northern Nigeria and the United Kingdom. Ibejii grew up with his siblings and grew up with a sense of abandonment because his parents were discrete with their feud, where one of them would often leave the country for days or weeks to escape each other.

Ibejii studied law at the university, he has a twin brother and grew up listening to rock, jùjú, electronic music, jazz and R&B. An essential part of his music-making journey which influences his African and international motifs stems from Yoruba culture and from a musical household that favoured the rich mix tunes of 1960s, 1970s and 1980s.

== Career ==
=== 2016: Early beginnings ===
Ibejii's stage name is rooted from and inspired by coming into this world as a twin. In 2016, he released his debut single titled "Ayanfe" which is in Yoruba language. According to Premium Times, "Ayanfe" is solidly rooted in the western Nigerian culture, renowned for its high incidence of twins and musical giants.

=== 2017: GreenWhiteDope 001 and GreenWhiteDope 002 debut albums ===
In 2017 Ibejii released his debut studio albums, GreenWhiteDope 001 and GreenWhiteDope 002 which he launched together, Pulse Nigeria described the project as "a tasteful party: one who seeks to paint pictures, tell stories and drive action with the power of his music." The same year, three songs from the album, "Ojo", "Kirakita" and "Alejo" were accompanied with music videos. The videos depicted storytelling and portrayed African culture.

=== 2018–2021: Tribal Marks, Music Saved My Life, Ìlù Ìlú and Intermission ===
He followed GreenWhiteDope 001 and GreenWhiteDope 002 with a third studio album, Tribal Marks released in 2018, "which was noted for its storytelling, African rhythms and classic jazz". "As well as themes of spirituality, love, politics, and menace and perils in the society". According to him, the album is a celebration of man, culture people and our place society. The Guardian described the project as "an establishment of Ibejii’s leading status within the alternative music universe". The following year, Ibejii released his fourth studio album MSML (Music Saved My Life). Since then he has released three more studio albums, including Ìlù Ìlú his fifth studio album released in 2020, and Intermission, his sixth collection released in 2021, which won the Best alternative album at the Headies Awards of 2022, "Gonto", the lead single from the album, was nominated for Best alternative song at the Headies 2022. "Gonto", which he said was inspired by the actions of Nigerian youths during the End SARS protest, was later accompanied with a music video, which starred some of Nollywood actors and actresses, and was short lived on stage at Terra Kulture in Lagos, Nigeria. Ibejii songs has been featured on movies including The Wedding Party, Catch.er, and Chief Daddy.

=== 2022–present: POST-19 ===
POST-19 his seventh album was released in 2022. A seven-track studio album which was later accompanied with music videos each. Business Day in Nigeria described POST-19 as "Ibejii's hyperbolic emotional encounter with lockdown and its offerings which meanders through the innocence and transition of time, life and love and also highlights other issues". A listening party was held for the album at Ikoyi, Lagos State which welcomed guests like Motolani Alake, and Brand Ambassador at Diageo, Tinya Alonge.

=== The Ibejii Live Experience ===
Ibejii established a musical festival tagged "The Ibejii Live Experience", an annual music festival that hosts on every Nigerian Democracy Day.

== Artistry ==
Ibejii music is described as multiple genres, fusion of West African percussive sounds with contemporary global music. His style has been described by The Guardian and Vanguard as eclectic, poet, thinker, and a storyteller who uses folklore, metaphor and vernacular to clothe his music and deliver in a unique and sensitive manner, exploring traditional Yoruba folk, Jazz, Dance, RnB, and Juju. Ibejii has listed Marvin Gaye, Fela Kuti, Brymo and Aṣa as some of his musical influences. Ibejii is also known for his retro afro style.

== Critical reception ==
In 2021, The Native magazine described "Gonto" as "a candid but soulful rebuke of the casual insensitivity of governments across the world in the wake of the tragedies of 2021 as well as a celebration of a new age of awakening, and Intermission as "a project about finding hope and exhilaration even in the strangest of places".

== Discography ==
=== Albums ===
- GreenWhiteDope 001 (2017)
- GreenWhiteDope 002 (2017)
- Tribal Marks (2018)
- MSML (Music Saved My Life) (2019)
- Ìlù Ìlú (2020)
- Intermission (2021)
- POST-19 (2022)

=== Singles ===
List of singles as lead artist, with selected chart positions and certifications, showing year released and album name
Title	Year	Certifications	Album
"Ayanfe"	2016		Non-album singles
"Brexit Horribliss"	2019		Non-album singles
"Fruit of Her Womb"	2020		Non-album singles
"Lekeleke"	2020		Non-album singles
"Gonto"	2021		Intermission
"Happy Me"	2021		Intermission
"Blown" (with Wavy the Creator)	2022		POST-19
