= VASA (singer) =

Nigerian singer and songwriter (born 2004)

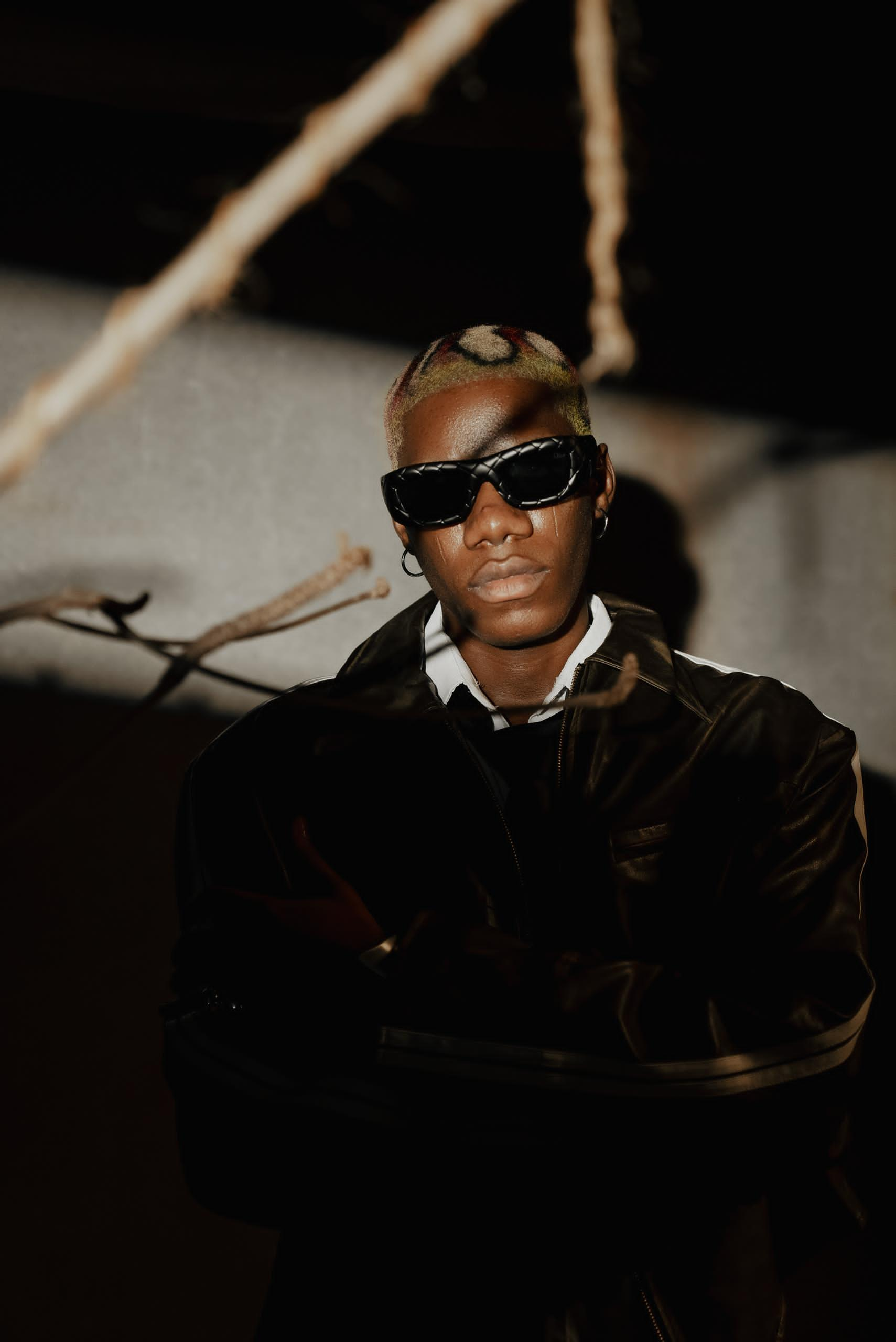

Background information
- Also known as: VASA
- Born: Freedom Oigocho Ali; 14 January 2004 (age 22); Lagos State, Nigeria
- Genres: Afrobeats, Afrosoul
- Occupations: Singer; songwriter
- Instrument: Keyboard
- Years active: 2020–present
- Label: Ize Records

Freedom Oigocho Ali (born 14 January 2004), known professionally as VASA, is a Nigerian singer and songwriter. He gained recognition following his 2023 viral freestyle on TikTok, Its success led him to release his official debut single, "Bolanle", to modest commercial success. He made his debut on Nigeria's TurnTable charts NXT Emerging Top Artistes at #17 in November 2024.

== Early life ==
VASA was born in Agege, Lagos State, Nigeria. He is an indigene of Agatu Local Government Area in Benue State. He was raised in Lagos State, where he completed his secondary education. He began writing songs at the age of 14.

== Career ==
Vasa started posting freestyles and covers on his Instagram page in 2020, when he was 15 years old. In August 2023, he release his first two singles, "Bolanle" and "Teriza". In November 2023, his single "Treasure" debuted on Apple Music’s East Africa Risers Shazam Top 200 and Spotify's Viral Top 50.

In January 2024, he released the single "50-50", which went viral in suburban Lagos. On February 15 he released a remix of "50-50" featuring additional vocals from fellow Nigerian singer Bella Shmurda. In June 2024 he released debut EP, Book of Vasa, featuring Crayon. On November 1, 2024 he released his sophomore EP, Book of Vasa Part 2, featuring Jaywillz and Nyola. It received positive critical responses.

In November 2024, Vasa made his debut on the TurnTable charts NXT Emerging Top Artistes; he reached #17 in the week November 15th to 21, 2024 with 13.03 points.

== Discography ==
=== EPs ===
- Book of Vasa Part 1 (2024)
- Book of Vasa Part 2 (2024)

=== Singles ===
- "Teriza"
- "Bolanle"
- "Treasure"
- "Trabaye" feat. Crayon
- "50-50"
- "50-50" Remix feat. Bella Shmurda
