= Declan Rice (song) =

Single by Odumodublvck

from the album EZIOKWU
- Released: 24 March 2023
- Genre: Hip hop; drill
- Length: 2:04
- Label: NATIVE Records; Def Jam
- Songwriter: Tochukwu Gbubemi Ojogwu
- Producers: Trill Xoe; John Wav

Odumodublvck singles chronology
"PICANTO" (2022)	"Declan Rice" (2023)	"DOG EAT DOG II" (2023)

"Declan Rice" is a song by Nigerian rapper Odumodublvck, released on 24 March 2023 through NATIVE Records, and Def Jam Recordings. The single was produced by Trill Xoe, and John Wav for Native and Def Jam. The song debuted at number 1 on Nigeria's Top Hip-Hop/Rap Songs and debuted at number 8 on the Official Nigeria Top 100 on 27 March 2023, recording the highest debut for a hip-hop record in the Top 100. It debuted at number 27 on the Billboard U.S. Afrobeats Songs for the week of 8 April 2023.

== Development ==
In an interview with OkayAfrica, Odumodublvck said “On my own, I did not plan to name it "Declan Rice." It just came out of my mouth, it was after it came out of my mouth, I started realizing the meaning of what it stood for. It was just like "Picanto". I did not write the hook of "Picanto", "Picanto" just came, I opened my mouth and that was what I said. It reminds me of something Stormzy said, that as an artist, he's come to a confirmation that he's just a vessel and everything comes from God. "Declan Rice" you're seeing is from God. So Trill (the producer) just played the beat. That was the first song I recorded when I got to Ghana. Trill played the beat and I'm like okay this is sounding nice. If you listen to "Declan Rice" very well, it sounds like The Game's "How We Do." It's a bop, that's why people liked it. When I opened my mouth while recording, the hook came out, the melody came out, and I filled in the words that's why I said 'men just boku, e be like dem be rice.' Next thing I said was 'I dey feel like declan rice.' For me, verses are almost easy for me to write. I am a seasoned artist, I know what to say in my verses. I need to say catchy stuff. I need to say stuff that's easy for people to remember, for people to sing along inasmuch as it is hip-hop."

== Critical reception ==
=== Recognition ===
On TheCable's TCL Radio critics' week of 1 April 2023, "Declan Rice" was ranked at number one. Following the success of the song, on 4 May 2023, West Ham former-midfielder Declan Rice, express how exciting it was for him, seeing Nigerians sing his name. In an interview with Match of the Day on BBC One, Declan Rice said: “Odumodu [Odumodublvck] – he brought out a song; it’s called ‘Declan Rice.’ “It dropped, and I was just like, yeah mad. I think it was the fastest-streaming song in Nigerian history. Number 1. It now like 15 million streams. “We’ve seen all these people singing my name. I’m getting all these Nigerian people commenting. “But that’s what it’s about though. I’ve got a couple of boys that are like, ‘We listen to it in the car and we just keep rewinding it, we’re like, yeah rewind’.

== Impact ==
On 15 July 2023, the song was featured in Declan Rice announcement video, after the signing to Arsenal F.C. was made public.

== Versions ==
- 2023: "Declan Rice"
- 2023: "Declan Rice (Arsenal Version)"

== Accolades ==
Awards and nominations for "Declan Rice"
Year	Organization	Award	Result
2023	The Headies	Best Rap Single	Won

== Commercial performance ==
On 27 March 2023, it debuted at number one on Nigeria's Top Hip-Hop/Rap Songs and debuted at number 8 on the Official Nigeria Top 100, recording the highest debut for a hip-hop record in the Top 100. On 3 April 2023, "Declan Rice" debuted on Nigeria's Official Airplay Chart, at number 9. It debuted at number 27 on the Billboard U.S. Afrobeats Songs on the week of 8 April 2023.

== Charts ==
Chart performance for "Declan Rice"
Chart (2022)	Peak position
NG Oficial Top 100 (TurnTable)	8
NG Top Hip-Hop/Rap Songs (TurnTable)	1
NG Official Radio Songs (TurnTable)	9
US Afrobeats (Billboard)	27
Nigeria TCL Radio (TheCable)	1
