= Tomi Agape =

- Born: 1993 (age 32–33); North West London
- Origin: Nigerian, English
- Genres: Afro-Fusion; Alternative R&B; Neo-soul; Alté; Afro-soul
- Occupations: Singer; Songwriter
- Years active: 2015–present

Tomi Agape (born 1993) is a Nigerian Afro-fusion, neo-soul, and alternative R&B singer, and songwriter. She is part of the Nigerian Alté scene.

Her breakthrough single "In The Night", features Nonso Amadi. In 2020, she released an extended play Never Gunna Be the Same, which included the tracks "London", "Better", and "Lovers Rock". She also contributed vocals on Cruel Santino's song "Rapid Fire".

== Early life ==
Tomi Agape was born in 1996 in North West London. She credited her Dad for her early music experience. In a conversation with BellaNaija, Tomi said; I grew up in a household filled with music and would wake up to old school RnB/Jazz/Hip Hop on Saturday mornings. Her dad played a lot of Fela Kuti's songs. She studied Performing Arts in university and once I got that degree I knew it was time to face the music, she tells Bella.

== Career ==
=== Music ===
Tomi launched her career in 2015 on SoundCloud and went on to release "Go There" featuring Eugy, and "La La La" featuring Ladipoe, both produced by Juls, who also introduced her to the public, with Bizzle Osikoya. In 2018, she released "In The Night", featuring Nonso Amadi, independently through The Plug. "In The Night" music video premiered on Soundcity TV and was released on 30 May 2018. In 2019, she featured on Cruel Santino's single "Rapid Fire". In the same year, she was on the line-up of Felabration London, and opened for Show Dem Camp's Palmwine Festival UK show. In 2021, she was on the line-up of Show Dem Camp's Palmwine Music Festival London show.

=== Other brand ===
In 2024, Tomi started her footwear company known as Guapé.

== Artistry ==
Clash Magazine writer Robin Murray, described her sound as filtering together R&B vocals, trap production, and elements of afrobeats. Robin also opined that Tomi Agape has constructed a sound that is entirely her own.
