= Ecko Miles =

Nigerian rapper and singer

- Born: Edison Ogums; August 20, 1997 (age 28); Port Harcourt, Nigeria
- Genres: Afropop; Afrobeats
- Occupations: Singer, Songwriter, Producer, Entrepreneur
- Instrument: Vocals
- Years active: 2020-present
- Label: Daed Empire

Edison Ogums (born August 20, 1997), known professionally as Ecko Miles, is a Nigerian musician and entrepreneur from Port Harcourt. He gained recognition after collaborating with Odumodublvck and Zlatan on the single "Picanto", which was released on 23 November 2022. The song debuted at number 79 on the TurnTable Top 100 chart, earning him his first chart entry. On 23 January 2023, "Picanto" peaked at number 65 on the chart, and Miles was ranked 6th on TurnTable's NXT Emerging Top Artistes list. He is the CEO and co-founder of Daed Empire Records.

== Early life ==
Edison Ogums was born on August 20, 1997, in Port Harcourt, Nigeria. He grew up in the city and moved to Lagos in 2021. He graduated with a Bachelor's degree in financial management technology from the Federal University of Technology, Owerri.

== Career ==
On 23 February 2021, Miles and his brother founded Daed Empire, a record label and talent agency dedicated to providing a platform for independent Nigerian artists. On 7 October 2022, he released "On God", his debut single under the label. On 23 November 2022, he released the single "Picanto", which features vocals by Zlatan and Odumodublvck. On 13 December 2023, he released the 7-track extended play titled Epiphany.

== Notes ==
Edison Ogums and Davidson Ogums, who are known as the Ogums Brothers, are joint owners of Daed Empire Records. As proprietors of the label, their collaborative efforts have garnered attention.

== Discography ==
Extended plays

- Epiphany (2023)

Singles

- "On God"
- "No Gree"
- "Lovina"
