= Bella Shmurda =

Nigerian singer-songwriter (born 1996)

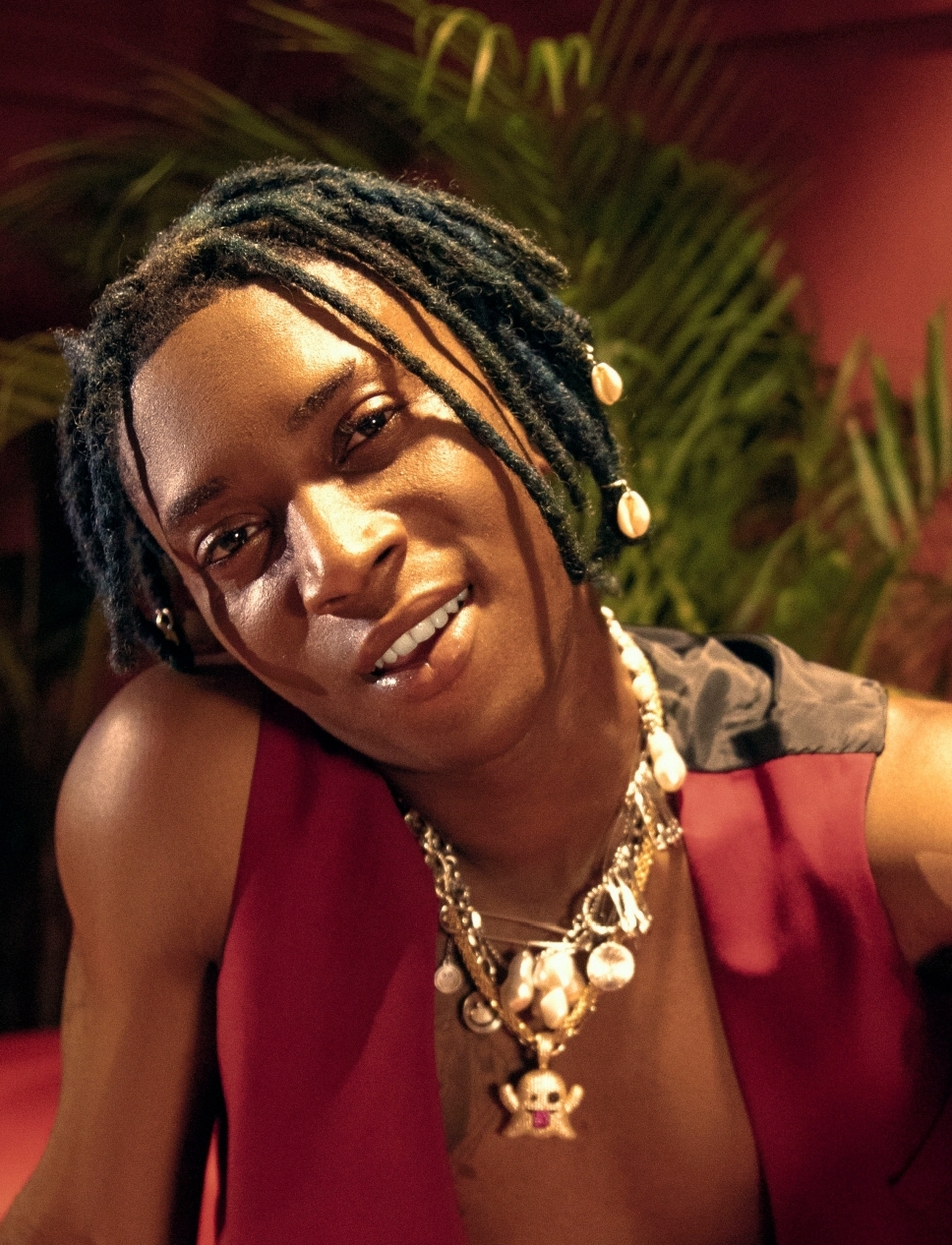

Background information
- Born: Abiola Ahmed Akinbiyi; 27 January 1996 (age 30); Ikorodu, Lagos, Nigeria
- Genres: Afrobeats; Street pop; Afro-fusion; World
- Occupations: Singer; songwriter
- Years active: 2017–present
- Label: Dangbana Republik

Abiola Ahmed Akinbiyi (born 27 January 1996), known professionally as Bella Shmurda, is a Nigerian singer and songwriter. He rose to prominence in 2019 with the release of the song "Vision 2020", and a follow-up remix which featured Olamide. He is also the leader of Dangbana Republik; a collective of creatives in Lagos providing community and humanitarian contributions.

== Early life and career ==
Bella Shmurda hails from a polygamous family in Ikorodu, Lagos State and is the last child from a family of 10 children. His journey in arts began in his early days through being a part of his elementary school band and cultural dance troupe. He grew up in Ikorodu, proceeded to have his secondary school studies in Badagry, and earned a bachelor's degree in History and International Relations from Lagos State University.

He gained public attention after his debut single "Vision 2020", caught the interest of Nigerian rapper Olamide who did a follow-up remix of the song. Poco Lee, who is a dancer and close friend to Bella Shmurda made a video with the song which made it viral and earned the interest of Olamide, who invited the latter over to his studio for a remix. The support Bella Shmurda got encouraged him to release his first EP "High Tension" in January 2020.

He released several other songs in 2020, one of which rapper Zlatan was featured in, titled "Cash App". In 2020, he was nominated for the Next Rated Award at The Headies 2020. He won the awards "Next Rated Male" and "Street Music of the Year" at the City People Entertainment Awards, and was also nominated for the "Revelation of the Year" Award Category in 2020.

In 2021, at the Global Music Awards Africa which held virtually in Ghana, he won in two award categories, Global Collaboration of the Year and Global Most Popular Song of the Year.

Also in 2021, he was the only Nigerian beneficiary among twenty-seven acts, across fourteen countries who were inducted into the YouTube Foundry Programme facilitated annually by YouTube Music to access and leverage resources aimed at artistes development to launch their music to a wider reach globally, create greater impact and promote a broad spectrum of musical heritage.

Following his breakout in the Afrobeat music industry in 2021, Bella Shmurda was featured in an episode on the African music interview series "This is Africa" by BBC. Also, in 2021, Bella Shmurda was nominated for the "Next Rated" award at the Headies Awards. In June 2021, his single, "Cash App" featuring Zlatan and Lincoln was nominated for "Most Played Song - Street Pop" at the NET Honours.

Bella Shmurda made his debut performance at The O2 Arena in the United Kingdom, as a guest performer at Wizkid's Made in Lagos Concert in November 2021.

In March 2023, he released his first single of the year, "Ara (Gen Gen Tin)" after his album project rollout. His single "Philo" which featured Omah Lay was released off his debut album "Hypertension" in October 2022 and received global attention, causing South African rapper Nasty C to make a remix of the song which dropped in March 2023. For his third release of the year, he collaborated with Tiwa Savage on a single titled "NSV" which dropped in May 2023 and was produced by Krizbeatz. Bella Shmurda released his sophomore album, Sanity, on the 3rd October 2025

== Philanthropy through Dangbana Republik ==
In October 2021, Bella Shmurda reacted to a viral video of a pre-schooler performing a song by Olamide and himself titled “Triumphant” off Olamide's “Carpe Diem” Album, by choosing to sponsor the kid with an elementary school scholarship. This scholarship came into effect in November 2021.

Also on his birthday in January 2022, he declared that through his collective, he would begin a program to feed a thousand destitute persons in the Ojo community where he grew up every year his birthday.

== Discography ==
=== EPs and Album ===
Year	Title	Tracks
2020	High Tension (EP)	1. Ginger Me (Intro); 2. Omnipotent; 3. Liquor; 4. Sho mo mi 5. Amope; 6. Vision 2020; 7. Upgrade
2021	High Tension 2.0 (EP)	1. Out There; 2. World; 3. Soldier Go; 4. Far Away; 5. Lako; 6. Rush; 7. Party Next Door; 8. Champion
2022	Hypertension (Album)	1. New Born Fela; 2. Ase; 3. Contraband; 4. Lose It ft. Simi; 5. Oh Oh Oh; 6. Converse ft. Phyno; 7. Fire; 8. Lagos City; 9. Level Up; 10. Philo ft Omah Lay; 11. Nakupenda ft BackRoad Gee, Not3s, L.A.X; 12. No Other ft. Victony; 13. Man of the Year; 14. Addicted; 15. So Cold ft. Popcaan
2023	DND (EP)	
2024	R2 Sept 12 (EP)	

=== Singles ===
Year	Song title	Producer	Album
2019	Vision 2020	ID Cabasa	
2019	Upgrade		
2019	Only You	BYLinx	
2020	Omnipotent	Saint Khor	High Tension EP
2020	Sho Mo Mi		High Tension EP
2020	Dangbana Orisa	Rexxie	
2020	Cash App	Dopestiks	
2021	Rush	LarryLanes	High Tension 2.0 EP
2021	World	SB the Producer	High Tension 2.0 EP
2021	So Cold ft. Popcaan	Linton White	Hypertension (Album)
2021	No Caution ft. Seyi Vibez	LarryLanes	
2021	Party Next Door	Vibez Ace	
2022	My Friend	Niphkeys	
2022	Many Things	Fancybeats	
2022	Fvck Off	Niphkeys & LarryLanes	
2022	New Born Fela	Fancybeats	Hypertension (Album)
2022	Philo ft. Omah Lay	Krizbeatz	Hypertension (Album)
2023	Philo Remix ft. Nasty C	Krizbeatz	
2023	NSV ft. Tiwa Savage	Krizbeatz	
2024	Loner		
2024	Evidence/Holy Man		
2024	1999 ft Bloody Civilian	BYLINX & PBeatz	R2 Sept 12 (EP)
2024	Mentali ft Boj	Krizbeatz	

=== Featured In ===
Year	Title	Producer	Album
2020	"Triumphant" (featuring Olamide)		Carpe Diem
2020	"Fade Away" (featuring Davido)		A Better Time
2021	"Jackpot" _{(featuring Crayon)}		Twelve A.M
2021	"Back 2 Back" (featuring Rexxie)		
2023	"DOG EAT DOG II" (Odumodublvck featuring Cruel Santino, and Bella Shmurda)		TBA
2024	"50-50" (VASA featuring Bella Shmurda)	T.U.C.	TBA
2024	"Bring It (Naija Remix)" (featuring Bella Shmurda)		
2025	"Delilah" (Bahd Man Niko featuring Bella Shmurda)	The Beat Murderer	

== Awards and nominations ==
Year	Event	Category	Nomination	Result	Ref
2020	City People Entertainment Awards	Revelation of the Year	"Self"	Nominated	
2020	City People Entertainment Awards	Next Rated (Male)	"Self"	Won	
2020	City People Entertainment Awards	Street Music of the Year	"Cash App" featuring Zlatan and Lincoln	Won	
2020	The Headies	Next Rated	"Self"	Nominated	
2021	Net Honours	Most Played Street Hop Song	"Cash App" featuring Zlatan and Lincoln	Nominated	
2021	AFRIMMA	Best Collaboration	"Cash App" featuring Zlatan and Lincoln	Nominated	
2021	Gbedu Music Awards	Artiste of the Year	"Self"	Won	
2021	The Headies	Next Rated	"Self"	Nominated	
2022	The Headies	Best Street Hop Artiste	"Self"	Nominated	

== See also ==
- List of Nigerian musicians
