= TurnTable End of the Year =

The TurnTable End of the Year charts are a top 50 list of and cumulative measure of singles' performance in the Nigerian music market, based upon the TurnTable charts, during any given chart year. TurnTable's "chart year" runs from the first "week" of January to the second week of December. The chart is released on 30 December of every year and published in TurnTable magazine's final print issue of each year.

== History ==
Following the launch of the weekly TurnTable Top 50 chart in November 2020. TurnTable began publishing its yearly issue on its website and in its magazine. TurnTable publishes its data, with its reports, at the end of each quarter of the year. TurnTable releases its Year to Date Charts to get an insight into the performance of music in the country in the year review. On 21 December 2021, TurnTable, Clout Africa, and Triller announced their partnership to launch its top 20 end-of-year chart roundtable countdown on Triller.

== Number ones ==
Number ones on TurnTable's End of the Year charts
Year	Single	Artist(s)	Ref.
2020	"Nobody"	DJ Neptune, Joeboy, and Mr Eazi	
2021	"Godly"	Omah Lay	
2022	"Buga (Lo Lo Lo)"	Kizz Daniel and Tekno	
2023	"Lonely At The Top"	Asake	
