= The Headies Award for Best Rap Single =

Nigerian music industry award

- Awarded for: Single (released on-air) recording of a rap song
- Country: Nigeria
- Presented by: Hip Hop World Magazine
- First award: 2006
- Final award: 2019
- Currently held by: Odumodublvck — "Declan Rice" (2023)
- Website: theheadies.com

The Headies Award for Best Rap Single is an award presented at The Headies, a ceremony that was established in 2006 and originally called the Hip Hop World Awards. (Note: The nominees for the 2006 edition are not included in the Recipients table because they are not available.) It was first presented to Mode 9 in 2006.

== Recipients ==
Best Rap Single
Year	Nominees	Result
2020	"Bop Daddy" – Falz (featuring Ms Banks)	Won
2020	"OGB4IG" – Reminisce	Nominated
2020	"Shut Up" – Blaqbonez	Nominated
2020	"Country" – Illbliss	Nominated
2020	"Get the Info" – Phyno (featuring Falz, Phenom)	Nominated
2019	"Talk" – Falz	Won
2019	"We Don't Do That Over Here" – Hotyce	Nominated
2019	"40 ft Container" – Illbliss (featuring Olamide)	Nominated
2019	"Sacrifice" – Payper Corleone (featuring Alpha Ojini)	Nominated
2019	"Gang Gang" – A-Q (featuring Loose Kaynon)	Nominated
2018	"You Rappers Should Fix Up Your Lives" – M.I	Won
2018	"Something Lite" – Falz (featuring Ycee)	Nominated
2018	"Link Up" – Phyno (featuring Burna Boy and M.I)	Nominated
2018	"Up To You" – Show Dem Camp (featuring Funbi)	Nominated
2018	"Me Versus Me" – Ice Prince	Nominated
2016	"Eyan Mayweather" – Olamide	Won
2016	"Asamalekun" – Reminisce	Nominated
2016	"Jagaban" – Ycee	Nominated
2016	"Chukwu Agozi Go Gi" – Illbliss	Nominated
2016	"Agu Ji Ndi Men" – A-Q	Nominated
2016	"Show You Something" – Boogey	Nominated
2015	"King Kong" – Vector	Won
2015	"Bank Alert" – Illbliss	Nominated
2015	"Bad Belle" – M.I	Nominated
2015	"Local Rappers" – Reminisce (featuring Olamide & Phyno)	Nominated
2015	"T.R" – G.O.D	Nominated
2014	"Parcel" – Phyno	Won
2014	"Dope Money" – Olamide (featuring Phyno)	Nominated
2014	"Shots on Shots" – Ice Prince and Sarkodie	Nominated
2014	"Rap It Up" – Posly TD	Nominated
2014	"Deaf" – Eva Alordiah	Nominated
2014	"WTF"- Illbliss	Nominated
2013	"Man of the Year" – Phyno	Won
2013	"Anam Achi Kwanu" – Illbliss (featuring Phyno)	Nominated
2013	"Durosoke" – Olamide	Nominated
2013	"2 Musshh" – Reminisce	Nominated
2013	"Ghost Mode" – Phyno (featuring Olamide)	Nominated
2012	"Angeli" – Vector (featuring 9ice)	Won
2012	"Too Much Money" – Iceberg Slim	Nominated
2012	"Shutdown" – Phyno	Nominated
2012	"Oh My Gosh" – Yung6ix	Nominated
2012	"Young Erikina" – Olamide	Nominated
2011	"Oleku" – Ice Prince (featuring Brymo)	Won
2011	"Ten Over Ten" – Naeto C	Nominated
2011	"Boys Are Not Smiling" – Terry Tha Rapman	Nominated
2011	"Eni Duro" – Olamide	Nominated
2011	"She and My Swagga" – Ruggedman (featuring Ice Prince)	Nominated
2010	"Sample" (Remix) – Terry Tha Rapman (featuring Stereo Man and Pherowshuz)	Won
2010	"Finest" – Knight House (featuring Sauce Kid and Teeto)	Nominated
2010	"Somebody Wants to Die" – M.I	Nominated
2010	"Owo Ati Swagger" – Cartiair	Nominated
2010	"Ako Mi Ti Poju" – Naeto C	Nominated
2009	"Kini Big Deal" – Naeto C	Won
2009	"Wa Wa Alright" – Kel	Nominated
2009	"Talking to You" – Mode 9 (featuring Banky W.)	Nominated
2009	"Safe" – M.I (featuring Djinee)	Nominated
2008	"Crowd Mentality" - M.I	Won
2008	"Mo" – Rooftop MC	Nominated
2008	"Stylee" – DJ Jimmy Jatt, Mode 9, 2Face Idibia & Elajoe	Nominated
2008	"U know My P" – Naeto C	Nominated
2006	"Elbow Room" – Mode 9	Won

== Category records ==
Most wins

Rank	1st	2nd
Artist	M.I; Vector; Phyno	Falz; Mode 9 Olamide; Ice Prince; Terry Tha Rapman; Naeto C
Total wins	2 Wins	1 win

Most nominations

Rank	1st	2nd	3rd
Artist	M.I; Olamide; Illbliss; Phyno	Naeto C	Mode 9 Ice Prince; Reminisce
Total noms	5 nominations	4 nominations	3 nominations
