= Show Dem Camp =

Nigerian rap duo

- Genre: Rap
- Members: Tec; Ghost

Show Dem Camp (SDC) is a Nigerian rap duo composed of Wale Davies (Tec) and Olumide Ayeni (Ghost).

== Personal lives ==
The duo were born in Nigeria but lived and grew up in European cities and the United States before returning to Lagos to pursue a career in music. Tec was working in finance in Amsterdam prior to moving to Nigeria.

== Career ==
Tec and Ghost were solo rap artists, till they met at a battleground only to discover they had the same stage name "Golden Child". They soon came together afterward to form a rap duo with evolving stage names Loose Cannonz, BlackBoysDown, Third Eye Renegades and they eventually settled for Show Dem Camp. They have transitioned from being not just only rappers but to being a record label owner. Their first mixtape titled Clone Wars Vol. 1 dropped in the year 2010. They have since then released a number of albums under the Clone Wars Series and Palm Wine Music.

They have worked with a lot of Alté artists such as Tems, BOJ, Odunsi the Engine, Cruel Santino, Buju, Ladipoe, Wani and others.

== Discography ==
=== Studio albums ===
- 2010: Clone Wars i
- 2011: The Dreamers Project
- 2012: Clone Wars II (The Subsidy)
- 2016: Clone Wars III (The Recession)
- 2017: Palmwine Music 1
- 2018: Palmwine Music 2
- 2019: Palm Wine Express
- 2019: Clone Wars IV (These Buhari Times)
- 2021: Clone Wars V (The Algorhythm)
- 2022: Palmwine Music 3
- 2024: No Love In Lagos.
- 2025: AFRIKA MAGIC

== Awards and nominations ==
Year	Award	Category	Nominee/Work	Result	Ref
2018	The Headies	Best Rap Single	"Up to You feat Funbi"	Nominated	
2019	The Headies	Best Rap Album	Clone Wars IV	Nominated	
