= Prettyboy D-O =

Nigerian musician

- Born: Donald Ofik
- Origin: Eastern Nigeria
- Genres: Afrobeats; Hip hop; R&B
- Occupation: Musician
- Instrument: Vocals
- Website: prettyboydo.com

Donald Ofik, popularly known as Prettyboy D-O, is a Nigerian recording artist with chaotic blend of Afrobeats, hip hop, alté, dancehall, and R&B. His debut mixtape Everything Pretty reached the number one spot on iTunes. He was nominated for The Headies 2022 Best Reggae and Dancehall Album.

== Music career ==
In July 2022, Aluna, Prettyboy D-O and KoolDrink teamed up to release the amapiano-Afrobeat single "Nowhere to Hide". In 2021, Prettyboy released his album, Love is War, and it appeared on The Fader's list of top 50 best albums 2021. His style has been described as "culte" (a combination of cult and alté) referring to his large following and mixture of street music and alté genres.

== Discography ==
=== Mixtape ===
- Everything Pretty (2018)
- Wildfire (2020)

=== Album ===
- Love is War (2021)

== Awards and nominations ==
Year	Award	Category	Recipient	Result	Ref
2022	The Headies	Best Reggae & Dancehall Album	Prettyboy D-O	Nominated	
