= Cruel Santino =

Nigerian musician (born 1992)

- Also known as: Ozzy B; Santi
- Born: Osayaba Andrew Ize-Iyamu; June 3, 1992 (age 34); Lagos, Nigeria
- Genres: Neo-Afropop; Hip hop; Alté; Alternative hip hop
- Occupations: Singer-songwriter; rapper; director
- Years active: 2016–present
- Labels: Monster Boy; Interscope; Warner Chappell; Immaculate Taste
- Website: www.cruelsantino.com

Osayaba Andrew Ize-Iyamu, better known by his stage name Cruel Santino, (born June 3, 1992) is a Nigerian alternative singer-songwriter, rapper and director. He is a member of the Monster Boys collective, with music producers Genio Bambino, and GMK. He was signed to Interscope Records, in partnership with Monster Boy, and Warner Chappell Music. Santino's debut into the music scene was met with critical acclaim when he released his studio album Mandy & The Jungle, introducing the alté fashion, and music, into the mainstream, notably with his track "Rapid Fire". He is regarded as one of the pioneers of the Nigerian alternative music scene.

== Early life ==
Osayaba Andrew Ize-Iyamu was born in Lagos on 3 June 1992, and raised in Ikeja. He was a teenage drama coordinator in high school. After graduation, he participated in city-wide attention as a freestyle-rap prodigy. In an interview with British GQ, he said "I heard Drake's first album, Thank Me Later. Hearing someone sing and rap confirmed to me that I could do the same." His father was responsible for his music education, while growing up.

== Career ==
=== 2011–2016: Ozzy B to Santi, Suzie's Funeral, Gangsta Fear ===
In 2011, he launched his music career as a rapper on SoundCloud, with the stage name Ozzy B. On 13 September 2011, he released a 21-track mixtape titled Diaries of a Loner, on SoundCloud. In review for We Plug Good Music, Neefemi, said "the project is one of Nigeria’s best mixtapes with time". On 29 September 2013, he released his second mixtape Birth of Santi. In 2016, he changed his stage name to Santi, with the release of his first extended play Suzie's Funeral, through Monster Boy on 30 June 2016.

On 29 June 2016, "Gangsta Fear" a song of his own composition, co-written by Odunsi the Engine, breakout from SoundCloud, with elements of afro-dancehall. Following the release of the music video directed by Falomo and Santi himself. The record became a commercial success in the alternative music scene, in Nigeria, and Britain.

=== 2017–2018: OVO Sounds, Beat 1, Concerts, Rapid Fire ===
It’s amazing that no matter where you’re from on the planet, you are to be able to put out music that feels and sounds like where you’re from without trying to conform to other standards. That’s what this is all about – people being able to create their own narratives, and have the world consume it. I don’t think Africa makes one style of music – I love Santi

— Ebro Darden

In 2017, he opened for Skepta’s at Our Homecoming concert in Nigeria. On 1 April 2017, " Jungle Fever", and "Gangsta Fear" was aired on OVO Sound’s Episode 40. On 22 December 2017, he opened for Burna Boy, Skepta, and J Hus at the second edition of Nativeland concert. On 29 December 2017, he opened for Show Dem Camp at The Palmwine Music Fest, alongside Bez, Ajebutter22, Lady Donli, Odunsi, Tomi Thomas, among others. On 21 January 2018, Santino, Odunsi, MAKA, and Lady Donli, covers the Guardian Life Magazine, Vibes Of The New Age edition, where they spoke about their plans for the future.

On 2 November 2018, as Santi, he released "Rapid Fire", featuring Shane Eagle, Tomi Agape, and Amaarae through Monster Boy, and produced by Genio Bambino. On 23 November 2018, the music video for "Rapid Fire" was released, and self-directed by Santino, as Santi. After his interview with Julie Adenuga, and Ebro Darden, on Apple Music 1, he gained international awareness.

In 2018, he signed a partnership deal with the North Carolina–based imprint Immaculate Taste, and rereleased Suzie's Funeral.

=== 2019–2020: Mandy & The Jungle, Record deals, No Tears In The Jungle show ===
On 17 May 2019, under his previous stage name Santi, Santino released his debut studio album Mandy & The Jungle, with special appearances from DRAM, GoldLink, Tay Iwar, Amaarae, Krisirie, Nonso Amadi, Bridge, Shane Eagle, Kida Kudz, Seki, and Tomi Agape. With production credits from Odunsi(The Engine), GMK, Higo, LeMav, DOZ, and Genio Bambino. Mandy & The Jungle, was cited as one of the Guardian albums and tracks of 2019.

On 28 August 2019, Santino, credited as Santi, directed "U Say" music video by GoldLink, featuring Tyler, The Creator, and Jay Prince, off Diaspora studio album. On 6 February 2020, Santi on the lineup of Lovebox Festival, set to take place at Gunnersbury Park in London, from June 12–14. Following the outbreak of the ongoing spread of coronavirus, the festival was cancelled. On 3 November 2019, he performed at Day n Vegas Festival at Las Vegas Festival Grounds, and opened for Tyler, The Creator, and Doja Cat.

On 10 November 2020, he performed at the Gnaw Stage, of the Camp Flog Gnaw Carnival. On 5 December 2019, he headline his first show in London, titled No Tears In The Jungle, at Islington Assembly Hall. On 3 March 2020, Santi reveals his plan, to create a TV show about Nigerian youth culture. He tells Crack Magazine, "That’s where my heart is right now. In Nigeria, we have never had a show about high school, sexuality and drugs. I feel like the kids need a safe space, something to explore and escape to."

On 19 May 2020, he tweeted "U Guy's I had to change my name to Cruel Santino, cause of one man in Spain, he didn't want to free the name for me. On 30 May 2020, he starred in The Late Night Show with Daisy Ola, where he played numerous characters as Hamma Santino, Santino Criminal, Santino and the leader, Cruel Santino.

On 19 June 2020, Cruel Santino unveiled the joint venture deal with Interscope Records, and Monster Boy, with the release of "End of The Wicked", featuring Octavian.

=== 2021-2023: Publishing deal, Subaru Boys : FINAL HEAVEN ===
On 17 February 2021, following the publishing partnership between Warner Chappell Music, and Love Renaissance, Monster Boys collective (Cruel Santino, GMK, and Genio Bambino) signed a publishing deal with Warner Chappell Music. On 4 March 2022, he released his anticipated studio album Subaru Boys : FINAL HEAVEN, through Interscope Records, with guest appearances from Brazy, Maison2500, Bratzbih, Seo, Ebee, Koffee, Gus Dapperton, Amaarae, Chi Virgo, Solis, and Skepta. Rolling Stone included the album in their list of The 100 Best Albums of 2022. On 10 February 2023, Santino released "Showmetheway!!" featuring Poco Lee, and produced by GMK for Monster Boy.

== Artistry ==
Santino is known for blending and fusing a variety of sounds, from R&B, soul and rap to Afrobeats and indie music,. On 11 June 2019, Toye Sokunbi of The Fader, named him, as the vision of Afropop’s future. Cruel Santino, formerly known as Ozzy B or Santi, is known for his ragga-influenced delivery, hair style and fashion sense. On 31 May 2019, in an interview with Clash magazine, Osayaba Andrew Ize-Iyamu describing himself as "being involved in all genres, definitely a unique individual. Taking inspiration for his name from Santigold. Inspired by the likes of Beenie Man, and Young Thug, as well as being shaped by indie and hip-hop music, has helped him evolve as an artist."

In 2011, he was rated as one of the best rappers in Nigeria, by Nigerian Afro-pop singer Wizkid. also appearing in a Nokia advert with, Nigerian rappers Muna, and Phenom.

== Discography ==
=== Albums ===
List of studio albums, with selected chart positions and certifications
Title	Album details
Mandy & The Jungle	Released: 17 May 2019; Label: Monster Boy; Formats: CD, Digital download
Subaru Boys: FINAL HEAVEN	Released: 4 March 2022; Label: Interscope, Monster Boy; Formats: CD, Digital download
K.O.T.B: The Bomberman Chronicles	Released : 6th November, 2026; Label: Native Sounds, Warner Records; Formats: CD, Digital download

=== EPs ===
List of extended plays, with selected details
Title	Details
Suzie's Funeral	Released: 30 June 2016; Label: Monster Boy; Formats: Digital download
Cincinnati Pumpin!	Released: 24 November 2023; Label: Monster Boy; Format: Digital download

=== Mixtapes ===
List of mixtapes with selected details
Title	Details
Diaries of a Loner	Released: 13 September 2011; Label: Formats: Digital download
Birth of Santi	Released: 29 September 2013; Label: Monster Boy; Formats: Digital download

=== Singles ===
List of singles as lead artist, with selected chart positions and certifications, showing year released and album name
Title	Year	Certifications	Album
"Gangsta Fear" (feat. Odunsi)	2016		Suzie's Funeral
"Jungle Fever" (feat. Genio Bambino, & Odunsi)	2017		Non-album single
"Rapid Fire" (feat. Shane Eagle, Tomi Agape, & Amaarae)	2018		Mandy & The Jungle
"Sparky"	2018		Mandy & The Jungle
"End Of The Wicked" (feat. Octavian)	2020		TBA
"OMOGE WA JO" (Note: Released exclusively on Spotify.) (feat. L0LA)	2022		Non-album single
"Showmetheway" (feat. Poco Lee)	2023		
"Holiday Sniping" (Note: A two pack, also includes "The Vatican: Superb Artistry" featuring Slater and L0LA.)	2023		
"Triology" with Vic Reagan	2025		
"Subaru Live Radio"	2025		
"International Collector/Oz."	2026		KOTB: The Bomberman Chronicles
"Big Drop" (feat. Zaylevelten)	2026		KOTB: The Bomberman Chronicles
"Heaven is in Pain" (feat. Indi)	2026		KOTB: The Bomberman Chronicles
"Rolen" (feat. Helena Gao)	2026		KOTB: The Bomberman Chronicles
"Siesta" (feat. Mavo)	2026		KOTB: The Bomberman Chronicles

As featured artist

List of singles as featured artist, with selected chart positions and certifications, showing year released and album name
Title	Year	Certifications	Album
"Jungle" (M.I Abaga feat. Tomi Thomas & Cruel Santino)	2018		Rendezous
"express" ( Odunsi (The Engine) feat. Cruel Santino & Nasty C)	2018		rare.
"Alté cruise" (Odunsi (The Engine) feat. Cruel Santino & Zamir LOS)	2018		rare.
"Vanya" (Shane Eagle feat. Cruel Santino & Bas)	2019		Dark Moon Flower
"SPACE" (Tay Iwar feat. Cruel Santino & Preye)	2019		GEMINI
"Kill My Spirit" (Kwesi Arthur feat. Cruel Santino & Sarkodie)	2019		Live From Nkrumah Krom Vol. II: Home Run
"Maayaa" (Juls feat. Tiggs Da Author & Cruel Santino)	2019		Colour
"Queen Tings (Remix)" (Masego feat. Cruel Santino (Note: at the time of this release (up until mid 2020) Cruel Santino was still going by the name Santi, hence the variety in names on this table. At the time of updating DSPs now reflect changed name across all discography.))	2019		Non-album single
"In The Mood" (Zirra feat. Cruel Santino)	2019		Positivity Only
"Poison" (Octavian featuring Take A Daytrip, Obongjayar, & Cruel Santino)	2020		
"Salty" (DRB LasGidi feat. Cruel Santino, Teezee, & Maison2500)	2020		Pioneers
"OVER YOU" (Joey B featuring Odunsi (The Engine) and Cruel Santino)	2020		Lava Feels
"Disintegrate" (Tochi Bedford featuring Cruel Santino)	2020		Eternal Mob
"JUMPING SHIP" (Amaarae featuring Kojey Radical and Cruel Santino)	2020		THE ANGEL YOU DON'T KNOW
"EDMP (E Dey Move Person)" (NATIVE Sound System featuring Cruel Santino)	2022		NATIVEWORLD
"Manhattan" (Teezee feat. Cruel Santino)	2022		TBA
"Lights" (Gus Dapperton feat. Cruel Santino)	2023		Henge
"DRGDLRS" (Len Lucci (Note: at the time of this release Len Lucci was still going by stage name Len.) feat. Cruel Santino)	2023		LEHGOLAND
"End of the Line" (Tochi Bedford feat. Cruel Santino)	2023		Half Blue
"And Just Like That" (chi feat. Cruel Santino)	2023		I've Seen The Lizard People
"DOG EAT DOG II" (Odumodublvck feat. Cruel Santino, and Bella Shmurda)	2023		EZIOKWU
"NOSTALGIA" (Odunsi (The Engine) feat. Cruel Santino)	2024		SPORT
"WICKED (Remix)" (SuperJazzClub feat. Cruel Santino)	2024		MONOCHROME RADIO (DELUXE)
"girl on a mission" (SOLIS4EVR feat. Cruel Santino)	2024		GHOST TOWN
"CHANEL" (Leather Park and Odunsi (The Engine) feat. Cruel Santino)	2024		LEATHER PARK (VOL.1)
"Borderline" (Boj feat. Cruel Santino)	2024		12 Summers
"YAWA" (Kasien feat. Cruel Santino)	2024		Non-album single
"Wishes" (JDM Global feat. Cruel Santino)	2024		Concrete Beach (EP)
"Kilon So" (NATIVE Sound System & Sholz feat. S-Smart & Cruel Santino)	2024		Kilon So/Follow The Leader
"Faaji Jackson" (Toye feat. Cruel Santino)		Wahala In Paradise	
"Attack" (Adekunle Gold feat. Cruel Santino)	2025		Fuji
"Wait" (Genio Bambino feat. Cruel Santino)	2025		Non-album single
"The Shift" (Vivendii Sound feat. Cruel Santino, Jeriq and Knucks)	2026		Rewind
"BOMBING" (wolfacejoeyy feat. Cruel Santino)	2026		Hues Vol. 3

== Awards and nominations ==
Year	Award ceremony	Award description	Nominee/Work	Result
2022	African Entertainment Awards USA	Video Director of the Year	Himself	Nominated
2023	The Headies	Best Alternative Song	"FINAL CHAMPION"	Nominated
2023	The Headies	Best Alternative Album	Subaru Boys : FINAL HEAVEN	Nominated
