= DRB LasGidi =

Nigerian musical group

DRB-La
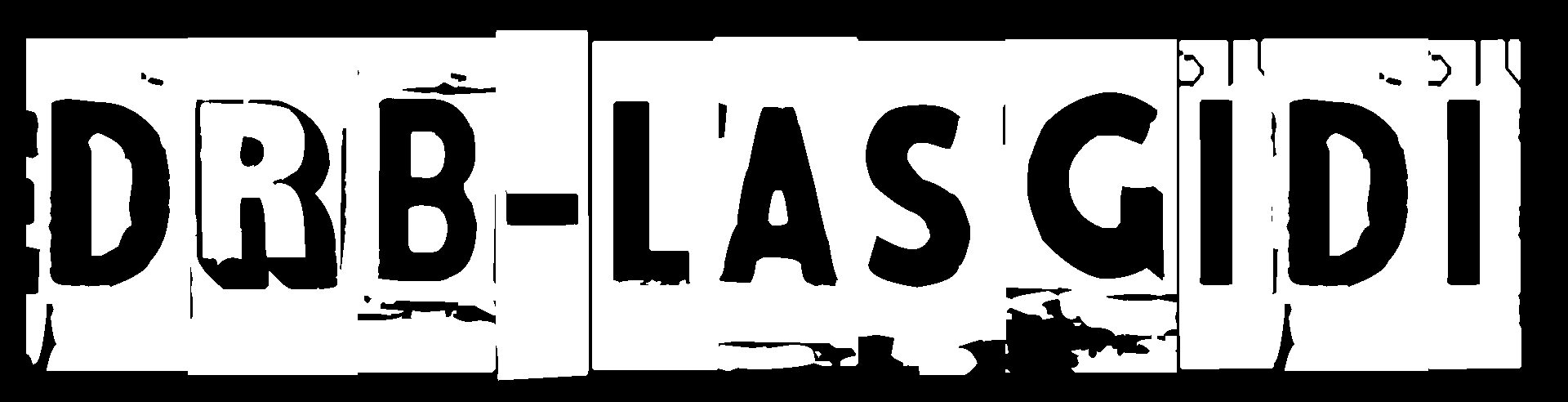
- DRB LasGidi logo

Background information
- Also known as: DRB
- Origin: Nigeria; United Kingdom
- Genres: Afrobeats, Alté
- Years active: 2007–present
- Label: Independent/LSG
- Members: Fresh L (Ladi Ladenegan); TeeZee (Teniola Zaccheaus); BOJ (Bolaji Odojukan)
- Past members: Imran Claud-Ennin; Tobenna Ofilli; Shayo Okupe; Tobi Ajayi

DRB LasGidi (previously known as "Rap Royals") is a Nigerian musical group. It was formed in 2007 by Tobi Ajayi, Tobenna Ofili, and Ladi Lanre. Teniola Zaccheaus joined later.

== History ==
Rap Royals officially kicked off with rapping and singing. They recorded over five tracks a day, made various freestyles to other known instrumentals and started to get a 'buzz' within their circle. Tobenna wrote the hooks with Tobi, while Ladi and Teniola handled the rapping.

Ladi became known as Fresh L, Teniola as TZ (TeeZee) and Tobi as Tobias. Their first CD was Coronation Vol.1. Dayo Ogundare, BOJ and others appeared on this mixtape.

"Marry You" was released over email. This was their first afrobeats track as a group. BOJ and Tobenna made the beat and laid down verses, while Fresh L rapped. It found favor on party playlists and then on a Lagos radio station.

Bolaji Odojukan a.k.a. BOJ then joined the group. Initially, he rapped on a few tracks, then left his unique vocals for a moment after "Marry You" was recorded.

=== DRB ===
The group started working with producer Ife Otedola. "Wait A Minute" got positive reviews, with rapper J.Rah jumping in. Originally a solo artist, he affiliated with Rap Royals. They performed at Concrete Rose. The group changed its name to DRB (Double R "Rap Royals" Boys). New members included 3feat, Yung Didz and IC. Gidilounge made a viral interview video.

"She Likes To" freestyle, involved non-DRB rappers.

In 2008, the Beats N Bars mixtape was made by FreshL and Tobenna with an appearance from 3feat. In 2009, Hooks N Bars mixtape was made and in 2010 HarDrive mixtape was made, featuring JRah, Costels, Phlowz, Stan and Davido, with production from Adey.

"Bad Man Jump" was DRB's single of that year and in the summer, the track took off with over 10,000 downloads.

=== DRB LasGidi/Creative Elevation ===
In 2011, as the team expanded, a decision was made to include Phlowz, Stan, Woodsy and Uzee as part of TeamDRB. Later that year, the team divided into Afro-beats vs UK. TZ, FreshL and BOJ were now DRB LasGidi (Afro-beats) while the rest were now Creative Elevation (CE) founded by Phlowz and Tobenna. Collectively, the movement is known as CEDRB, with their close friends Joey, Jerry, Ik, Ausboss and KC moving in with the group.

DRB LasGidi focused on the African market. Tenny Karim (known as TK) became their manager, working with BOJ, FreshL and TZ. He had connections in the industry. Their first release was one of BOJ's 2008 vocals that they repolished, becoming "Gra Gra". Fresh L was up next with "Bring Out The Rose" dropping in October, featuring TeeZee and produced by Adey. This was a "banger" according to DJ's and was played in clubs and on radio. TeeZee released his own track, "Swagga Mi Gbono" featuring BOJ, produced by K-Logic. This was also a club hit and got radio play. Old fans were excited about this new force, and DRB LasGidi generated a lot more supporters between July and December 2011. At Christmas that year, BOJ and TeeZee travelled to Lagos, while Fresh L stayed in London to work on music, hoping to find inspiration..

In 2012, "LXIX" was made and released three days before DRB's first single, "Toyin", which was produced by DJ Caise. The track was a hit, with about 25,000 downloads in the first month and over 20,000 plays on blogs. FJ Ayodeji joined DRB LasGidi as their assistant manager and handled the finance from tours and bookings, Papi YT became the creative director, while Ola (Bado) provided fashion inspiration and was a major advisor. He and his team, MV (Jimmy and Anthony), are closely affiliated with DRB. Wunmi Bakare handles public relations and also works for one of Nigeria's biggest female artists, Tiwa Savage. The music video for "Toyin" was released during the summer of 2012, when DRB's second single was due for release.

== Discography ==
=== Albums ===
| Title | Album details |
|---|---|
| DRB 10 | Released: 23 November 2018; Label: Jungle Entertainment Ventures; Format: Digital download, streaming |
| Pioneers | Released: 1 May 2020; Label: Zero Label Records; Format: Digital download, streaming |

=== Solo discography ===
| Artist | Title | Album details |
|---|---|---|
| TeeZee | Mixtape | Released: 17 May 2013; Label: LSG Entertainment; Format: Digital download, streaming |
| BOJ | #BOTM | Released: 21 February 2014; Label: Jungle Entertainment Ventures; Format: Digital download, streaming |
| BOJ | Magic | Released: 13 October 2017; Label: Jungle Entertainment Ventures; Format: Digital download, streaming |
| BOJ (with Ajebutter22) | Make E No Cause Fight | Released: 17 May 2018; Label: Jungle Entertainment Ventures; Format: Digital download, streaming |
| Fresh L. | See U Next Summer | Released: 17 August 2018; Label: Jungle Entertainment Ventures; Format: Digital download, streaming |
| BOJ (with Ajebutter22 & Falz) | Make E No Cause Fight 2 | Released: 29 November 2019; Label: Jungle Entertainment Ventures; Format: Digital download, streaming |
| TeeZee | Arrested by Love | Released: 18 February 2022; Label: Self-released; Format: Digital download, streaming |
| BOJ | Gbagada Express | Released: 22 April 2022; Label: Moves Recordings; Format: Digital download, streaming |
| Fresh L. | Lifestyle | Released: 30 November 2023; Label: Action Boyz/Moves Recordings; Format: Digital download, streaming |
