= TurnTable =

Nigerian music and entertainment magazine

- Editor-in-chief: Ayomide Oriowo
- Categories: Entertainment
- Frequency: Yearly
- Founder: Ayomide Oriowo; Similoluwa Adegoke
- Founded: 2020
- First issue: 19 December 2020
- Country: Nigeria
- Based in: Lagos
- Language: English
- Website: www.turntablecharts.com/magazine

TurnTable is a Nigerian music and entertainment magazine founded by Ayomide Oriowo, and Similoluwa Adegoke. TurnTable focuses primarily on music charts, news, and events. Its music charts include the Top 100, and the Year-End chart. TurnTable magazine has two issues, and its first issue was published on 19 December 2020, by Similoluwa Adegoke. Its issues are printed in English language. In 2023 the magazine launched its music recording certification, TurnTable Certification System of Nigeria to represent the recording certification system of music industry in Nigeria.

== History ==
TurnTable was founded in 2020, by Ayomide Oriowo, and Similoluwa Adegoke. On 13 July 2020, TurnTable launched its Top 50 chart, and started operations on 9 November 2020. In December, it began publishing the Top 50 End-Year chart. Since its launch, the magazine has covered Chike, Lojay, and Asake in its issues. The magazine features includes: music executive Bizzle Osikoya, talent managers Bose Ogulu, and Asa Asika. Musicians, Yemi Alade, Namenj, Babyboy AV, Mayorkun, Snazzy the Optimist, Ayra Star, American-Cameroonian singer Libianca, Burna Boy, British musician Wizz Jones. Fave, and record producers Don Jazzy, Niphkeys, and Tempoe.

On 12 September 2022, Ayomide Oriowo announced the departure of Adeayo Adebiyi, the co-editor-in-chief of TurnTable.

== News publishing ==
TurnTable publishes a news website and a yearly magazine that covers music, and entertainment. It covers news, charts, interviews, and music reviews, but its major influential creation is the TurnTable charts. The charts track music airplay (radio, and television), and digital streaming. The TurnTable Top 50 chart of the top streamed and selling songs was introduced in 2020. On 31 March 2022, it announce the expansion of the Top 50 into 100. On 11 July 2022, it released it first issue of the TurnTable Nigeria Top 100. The website includes the TurnTable charts, news separated by chart news, and genre. Its print magazine sections include:

- TurnTable End of the Year: A chart of the top 50 most popular songs of the year.
- TurnTable Power List: Top 30 most influential individuals serving in various capacities in the Nigerian music industry.
- TurnTable NXT: A chart for emerging creatives who are contributing to the Nigerian story.
- Next Rated Leaderboard: A chart for best performing new artiste.
- Industry Digest: A monthly issue with a view of presenting news, interviews and insights into everything Nigerian music and Afrobeats.

== Awards ==
Since 2023 TurnTable established the TurnTable Music Awards, a digital award platform designed to acknowledge and celebrate greatness in music. From production and songwriting to live performances and contributions to music in film, these awards major goal is to honor the diverse talents that shape and elevate the global music landscape during the year form sales, streaming, radio airplay, touring, and social engagement.

== See also ==
- TurnTable charts
