= TurnTable charts =

Nigerian national record chart

- Predecessor: Playdata charts
- Formation: 3 July 2020; 5 years ago
- Founder: Ayomide Oriowo; Similoluwa Adegoke
- Founded at: Lagos, Nigeria
- Key people: Oye Akideinde (Executive); Bizzle Osikoya (Executive)
- Parent organization: TurnTable
- Website: www.turntablecharts.com

TurnTable charts is a catalog of relative weekly, and yearly popular songs in Nigeria. The results are published in TurnTable magazine. TurnTable provides additional weekly charts, as well as the End of the Year Top 50. The charts can be ranked according to airplay, and digital streaming. For main song charts such as the TurnTable Top 100, all three data are used to compile the charts. For End of the Year Top 50, streams and airplay from TurnTable Top 100 are included.

== History ==
On 3 July 2020, TurnTable magazine launched the TurnTable Chart, with its weekly official chart TurnTable Top 50, first led by Wizkid "Ginger" featuring Burna Boy, on the number one spot. The chart combines radio airplay, and online streaming activity (including data from YouTube, Boomplay Music, Audiomack, Apple Music, Deezer and Spotify).

In March 2021, TurnTable announce its partnership with City FM 105.1, for the syndication of TurnTable Top 50. As the weekly results will be announced on City 105.1 FM radio show City Cafe, hosted by Melody Hassan. On 12 March 2021, TurnTable Charts partnered with WeTalkSound, and launched the Recording Certification of Nigeria. On 21 May 2021, Turntable Charts announced its partnership with The Aristokrat Group. As the partnership allows both companies collaborate in the exchange of data and ideas to improve music consumption, documentation, and chart culture in Nigeria. On 24 May 2021, Turntable Charts announce its partnership with Chocolate City, as both companies will exchange data and ideas in improving music consumption, documentation, and chart culture in Nigeria. On 14 July 2021, TurnTable announced its first direct partnership between TurnTable Chart, and Boomplay. As its partnership allows, Boomplay to distribute its data on the most streamed songs in Nigeria.

On 30 December 2021, Oye Akideinde and Bizzle Osikoya joined TurnTable as executives. On 31 March 2022, TurnTable began collecting data from Apple Music, Deezer and Spotify into its charts. It also announce the expansion of the TurnTable Top 50 chart, into Top 100 in June 2022.

=== 2020–2023: charts created, renamed, and expanded ===
On 3 July 2020, TurnTable Top 50 was launched to measure the trends and performance of songs in Nigeria. On 6 July 2020, Airplay Top 50 was launched to incorporate radio airplay data provided by Radiomonitor over the week. The TurnTable Airplay Top 50 chart blends total numbers of plays on the radio from over 50 radio stations in Nigeria. On 14 July 2020, TurnTable magazine launched Top 50 Streaming Songs, to monitor the most streamed weekly song on digital platforms.

On 21 August 2020, Top Triller Chart Nigeria was launched in collaboration with Triller. It highlights the most popular songs on the video based app on a methodology that blends the amount of views containing a respective songs, the level of engagement with those videos and the raw total of videos uploaded featuring each song, according to Triller’s data. On 7 September 2020, TurnTable TV Top songs was launched to monitor top 50 songs from 5 cable television channels (data sourced from Radiomonitor/Media Planning Service). On 14 September 2020, TurnTable Digital Song Sales was launched to combine sales of physical and digital sells of songs for a summarized figure.

On 31 March 2022, TurnTable announce the expansion of the TurnTable Top 50, into Top 100. The chart expansion will be supported by TurnTable Top 200, as the official album-based chart, and the TurnTable Top Artiste 100, to watch the performance based on the artiste. The TurnTable Top 100, Top 200, and Top Artiste 100, launched in June 2022. On 27 May 2022, TurnTable launched the "Next Rated Leaderboard", in the first quarter of its yearly issue, based on the cumulative ranking of the best performing new artiste, published monthly by TurnTable, with data based on its total streams across streaming services, radio, and TV. These are artistes that would be eligible for The Headies Next Rated award.

On July 11, 2022, following the expansion of the TurnTable Top 50, into the Top 100, the Airplay Top 50, was renamed to Top Radio Songs. The chart was launched on 13 July 2022 and began ranking the 100 top songs on the radio. The TV Top songs were also renamed to Top TV Songs, and began ranking the top 100 songs on TV. The Top 50 Streaming Songs were also renamed to Top Streaming Songs, and began ranking top 100 songs on digital streaming. On 8 November 2022, the album's official chart, began operation as the current TurnTable Top 50 chart instead of TurnTabel Top 200, as announced in March. The Nigeria album chart employs the same metrics as the Top Streaming Songs chart.

On 6 February 2023, Ayomide Oriowo, and Kayode Babatola announce the launching of TurnTable Top Catalog Songs, to begin operation on 8 February 2023. TurnTabe Charts also launched in Nigeria a certification system based on on-demand streaming and digital downloads. Paid streams weigh more than ad-supported streams when it comes to on-demand streaming.

== Songs ==
=== Main ===
Chart title	Chart type	Number of positions	Description
TurnTable Top 100	airplay + streaming	100	The Nigeria music industry-standard song popularity chart; One of the component charts of the End of the Year Top 50
Top Radio songs	airplay	100	Ranks the top 100 songs on the radio.
TV Top songs	airplay	100	Ranks the top 100 songs on television.
Top Streaming Songs	streaming	100	Ranks top 100 streaming digital song
Artiste Top 100	airplay + streaming	100	Ranks the top 100 artistes; Ranks most popular songs by artists
Producers Top 100	airplay + streaming	100	Ranks the top 100; Ranks most popular songs by producers

=== Genre ===
Chart title	Chart type	Number of positions	Description
Top Afro-Pop Songs	airplay + streaming	25	Ranking the most popular Afro-Pop songs.; Afro-Pop songs chart, is an important component in the ranking of the best song performance in sales, streaming, and airplay, before being included in TurnTable Nigeria Top 100 chart.
Top Afro-R&B Songs	airplay + streaming	25	Ranking the most popular Afro-R&B Songs.; Afro-R&B Songs chart, is an important component in the ranking of the best song performance in sales, streaming, and airplay, before being included in TurnTable Nigeria Top 100 chart.
Top Street-Pop Songs	airplay + streaming	25	Ranking the most popular Street-Pop Songs.; Street-Pop Songs chart, is an important component in the ranking of the best song performance in sales, streaming, and airplay, before being included in TurnTable Nigeria Top 100 chart.
Top Hip-Hop/Rap Songs	airplay + streaming	25	Ranking the most popular Hip-Hop/Rap Songs.; Hip-Hop/Rap Songs chart, is an important component in the ranking of the best song performance in sales, streaming, and airplay, before being included in TurnTable Nigeria Top 100 chart.
Top Gospel Songs	airplay + streaming	20	Ranking the most popular Gospel Songs.; Gospel Songs chart, is an important component in the ranking of the best song performance in sales, streaming, and airplay, before being included in TurnTable Nigeria Top 100 chart.
Top Alternative Songs	airplay + streaming	20	Ranking the most popular Alternative Songs.; Alternative Songs chart, is an important component in the ranking of the best song performance in sales, streaming, and airplay, before being included in TurnTable Nigeria Top 100 chart.
Top Traditional Songs	airplay + streaming	20	Ranking the most popular Traditional Songs.; Traditional Songs chart, is an important component in the ranking of the best song performance in sales, streaming, and airplay, before being included in TurnTable Nigeria Top 100 chart.

=== Other charts ===
Chart title	Chart type	Number of positions	Description
Bubbling Under Top 100	airplay + streaming	25	Ranks the top 25 songs below #100 that have not previously appeared on the Top 100.; Its positions do not directly rank from 101-125, but function as an extension of the 100.
NXT Emerging Top Songs	airplay + streaming	20	Ranks the most popular songs by emerging artistes.
Top International Songs	airplay + streaming	25	Ranks the popular songs by non-Nigerians by combining airplay, and streaming data.

On 30 June 2021, TurnTable and The Native launched their summer chart. On 6 September 2021, TurnTable charts published the final issue of the chart with Wizkid "Essence", emerging as number 1 on Global chart, Master KG "Jerusalema", topping the African chart, and Ladipoe "Feeling" leading the Songs of the Summer chart.

== Albums ==
=== Main ===
Chart title	Chart type	Number of positions	Description
TurnTable Top 100	streaming	100	The Nigeria music industry-standard album popularity chart

=== Genre ===
Chart title	Chart type	Number of positions	Description
Afro-Pop Albums	streaming		Ranking the most popular TurnTable Nigeria Afro-Pop Albums.; Afro-Pop Albums chart, is an important component in the ranking of the best album performance in streaming, before being included in TurnTable Nigeria Top 50 chart.
Afro-R&B Albums	streaming		Ranking the most popular TurnTable Nigeria Afro-R&B Albums.; Afro-R&B Albums chart, is an important component in the ranking of the best album performance in streaming, before being included in TurnTable Nigeria Top 50 chart.
Street-Pop Albums	streaming		Ranking the most popular TurnTable Nigeria Street-Pop Albums.; Street-Pop Albums chart, is an important component in the ranking of the best album performance in streaming, before being included in TurnTable Nigeria Top 50 chart.
Hip-Hop/Rap Albums	streaming		Ranking the most popular TurnTable Nigeria Hip-Hop/Rap Albums.; Hip-Hop/Rap Albums chart, is an important component in the ranking of the best album performance in streaming, before being included in TurnTable Nigeria Top 50 chart.
Gospel Albums	streaming		Ranking the most popular TurnTable Nigeria Gospel Albums.; Gospel Albums chart, is an important component in the ranking of the best album performance in streaming, before being included in TurnTable Nigeria Top 50 chart.
Alternative Albums	streaming		Ranking the most popular TurnTable Nigeria Alternative Albums.; Alternative Albums chart, is an important component in the ranking of the best album performance in streaming, before being included in TurnTable Nigeria Top 50 chart.
Traditional Albums	streaming		Ranking the most popular TurnTable Nigeria Traditional Albums.; Traditional Albums chart, is an important component in the ranking of the best album performance in streaming, before being included in TurnTable Nigeria Top 50 chart.

== See also ==
Official website
