= The Native =

Nigerian music magazine

- Managing Editor: Tami Makinde
- Categories: Music magazine
- Frequency: 4 per annum
- Publisher: The NATIVE Networks
- Founder: Teezee; Seni Saraki; Sholz
- Founded: 2016
- First issue: December 2016
- Country: Nigeria
- Based in: Lagos
- Language: English
- Website: thenativemag.com

The Native (stylized in all caps) is a Nigerian-based music magazine publishing in Lagos. Founded in 2016, The Native focuses primarily on music, style, and art, championing the sounds and culture of tomorrow, today.

== History ==
The Native was established in 2016 by Seni Saraki, Teni (Teezee) Zaccheaus, Olushola (Sholz) Fagbemi, Addy Edgal and Suleiman Shittu. Since launching, the magazine has featured Nigerian artists including Wizkid, Burna Boy, Naira Marley and fashion designer Mowalola Ogunlesi. Burna Boy was the first artist featured on the magazine in 2017 with The Native's Birth Issue, setting the tone for their future. In 2018, The Native released the second issue of its print magazine. The issue was released at a launch party in London, organised by the magazine and Boiler Room. The event provided a platform for artist to perform such as Lady Donli, Pretty Boy D-O, Wizkid, and Tau Benah, among others. Later that year, The Native collaborated with Nike on limited edition football jersey, Nike by Native.

In 2019, The Native released three covers in its Rebel issue which featured singer and rapper, Cruel Santino, Odunsi The Engine and TENI. Mowalola, Naira Marley and Tems featured on the NATIVE's Time Issue in the summer of 2020. A few months later, in December, the magazine partnered with Wizkid for a limited edition magazine Wizmag that celebrates his album, Made in Lagos.

== Nativeland ==
Nativeland is an annual music concert organised by The Native at Muri Okunola, Victoria Island, Lagos. The first Nativeland concert was held in December 2016, the same day the magazine was launched.

== See also ==
- Nativeland
- Native Sound System
