= Odunsi the Engine =

Nigerian singer-songwriter and record producer (born 1996)

Odunsi (The Engine)
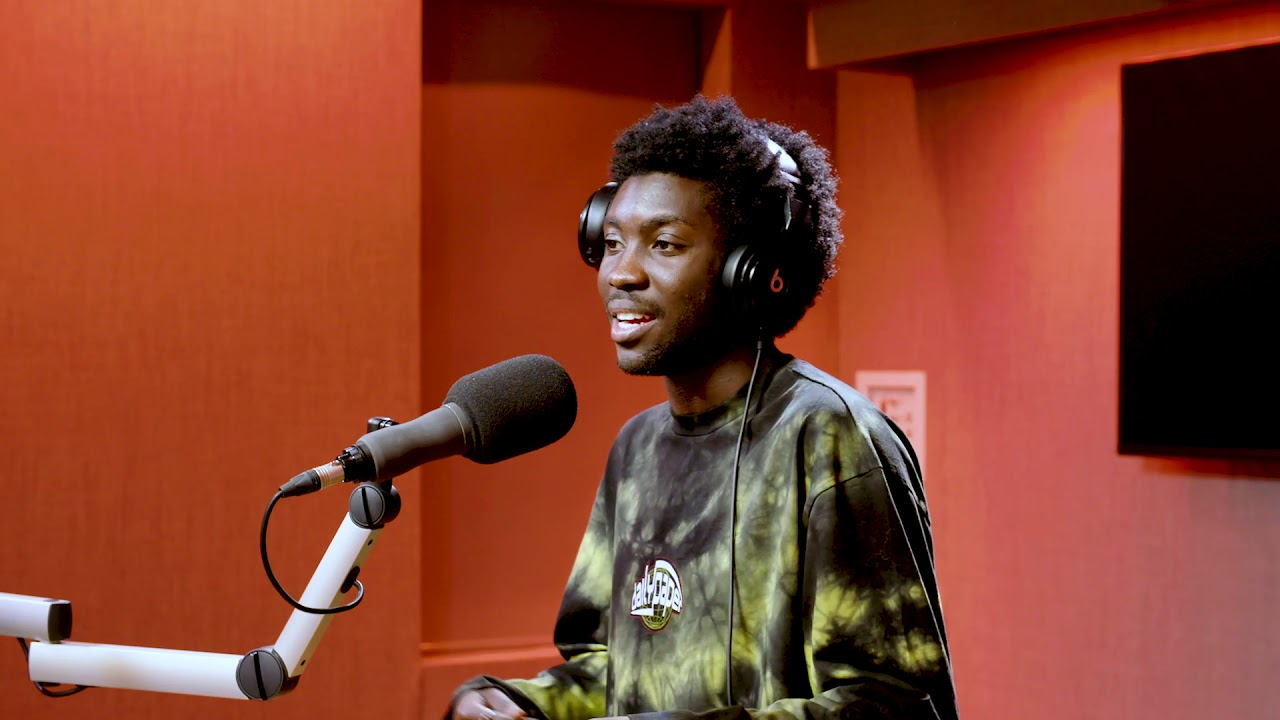
- Odunsi on Soulection Radio

Background information
- Also known as: Odunsi (The Engine), Odunsi, The Engine
- Born: Bowofoluwa Olufisayo Odunsi; 7 June 1996 (age 30); Lagos State, Nigeria
- Genres: Alté; Hip hop; Contemporary R&B; Afrobeats
- Occupations: Singer-Songwriter; Rapper; Record Producer
- Years active: 2016-present

Bowofoluwa Olufisayo Odunsi (born 7 June 1996) known professionally as Odunsi the Engine stylized Odunsi (The Engine) is a Nigerian alternative singer-songwriter, rapper and record producer. Odunsi came into the music scene in 2018 with his full-length debut album Rare which earned him nominations at The Headies and SoundCity MVP Awards establishing him as a critical figure in the innovative Nigerian Alté music scene, he is widely regarded as one of the pioneers of Alte music. In 2019 he was profiled by The New York Times as the new guard of Nigerian music.

== Early life ==
Odunsi (The Engine) was born on 7 June 1996, in the former capital of Nigeria, Lagos State. He grew up with his family in Lagos. Growing up he listened to R&B music from artistes like Donell Jones, Sade, Prince and King Sunny Ade which he credits his older brother for introducing him to the genre. Odunsi grew up alongside his siblings. He had a good relationship with them but at some point felt alone while he was still a teen because he felt his older siblings were too old for him and his younger brother was too young for him. Odunsi dropped out of school in 2015 because of his struggle with ADHD which he describes as part of his inspiration.

== Career ==
Odunsi started honing his skills musically in high school with his friends where they often made songs in class before he started going to studio but was unable to afford the studio time. He started music professionally in 2015 as a record producer and rapper before transitioning into a singer the same year. His debut single, "Vibrate" was released in 2016, same year he released "Happy Hour" featuring Okuntakinte which caught the notice of Mobo Awards and was listed as an artist to watch in 2016. Same year he released "Situationship" featuring Aylø. His debut studio album Time Of Our Lives was released same year. The following year he released "Desire" featuring Funbi and Tay Iwar. His collaborative Extended play War with Nonso Amadi was released the same year and "Alte cruise" with Zamir and Cruel Santino was released in 2018. After releasing multiple singles including "Better Days" featuring WANI and "Decided" featuring Grammy award-winning singer and songwriter Tems, his second studio album which he saw success with Rare was released and featured stars like Davido, Amaarae, duendita, Cruel Santino, Nasty C, Hamza, Zamir, Runtown, Solis and Tay Iwar. His 3rd studio album EVERYTHING YOU HEARD IS TRUE was released in 2020.

== Discography ==
=== Studio albums ===
- Time of Our Lives (2016)
- Rare (2018)
- Everything You Heard Is True (2020)

=== EPs ===
- War (2017)
