= BOJ (musician) =

English-Nigerian singer, rapper and record producer (born 1994)

- Born: Bolaji Odojukan; April 22, 1994 (age 32); London, England
- Origin: Gbagada, Lagos, Nigeria
- Genres: Alté; afropop
- Occupations: Singer; songwriter; record producer; rapper
- Years active: 2007–present
- Labels: Action Boyz; MOVES Recordings
- Member of: DRB LasGidi (2007-present)
- Education: Malvern College

Bolaji Odojukan (born 22 April 1994), better known by his stage name BOJ, is an English-Nigerian singer, songwriter and record producer. He is one-third of the musical group DRB LasGidi with TeeZee and Fresh L, and is known as a pioneer of alté.

== Early life ==
Bolaji Odojukan was born in London, England and was raised in both the UK and Nigeria. He studied Business Management and Audio Engineering in university. After graduating, he moved back to Lagos in 2015. Bolaji parents were responsible for his music education, while growing up they played Lauryn Hill, Lagbaja, and Wyclef records in the house. In year 9 (JSS 3), Bolaji began making music while still schooling at Malvern College, in Malvern, Worcestershire, England.

== Career ==
Boj joined the group DRB LasGidi in 2007 with his school friends Teezee and Fresh L. On 22 April 2013, Boj released his first solo mixtape titled #BOTM. The mixtape featured guest appearances from Lola Rae, Teezee and Fresh L (of DRB LasGidi), Tec (of Show Dem Camp), Lynxxx, Poe, Ajebutter22, and Efya. Production was handled by Studio Magic, Bankyondbeatz, ODH and CEO. The mixtape included the single "Bolaji On The Microphone", abbreviated as "BOTM". On December 14, 2014, the single won the Best Alternative Song award, at the ninth edition of the Headies Awards. The deluxe was later released on 13 April 2016. On 13 July 2016, he signed a recording contract with HF Music, and released his first debut album Magic, on October 13, 2017. He released two collaborative extended play's titled Make E No Cause Fight in 2018, with Ajebutter22 and Make E No Cause Fight 2 in 2019 with Ajebutter22 & Falz.

On October 14, 2018, BOJ was part of the "Smooth Taste, That's Why" campaign that launched on thirteen billboards around Lagos and Abuja, by Jameson Irish Whiskey. In 2019, he signed a publishing and distribution deal with MOVES Recordings, with the release of "Your Love (Mogbe)", with Afro Nation, featuring Tiwa Savage. On 18 September 2020, Boj released the single "Abracadabra" featuring Davido and Mr Eazi. On 7 July 2021, he released the single "Money & Laughter" featuring Nigerian singer Zamir and Ghanaian singer Amaarae. On 23 July 2021, he appeared on Dave's album We're All Alone in This Together on the song "Lazarus". On December 10, 2021, MOVES Recordings featured "Your Love (Mogbe)", and "Abracadabra", in its double compilation album, 5 Years of Culture: Afrobeats, and 5 Years of Culture: Rap & Drill.

On 22 April 2022, Boj released his album Gbagada Express including guest appearances from Davido, Mr Eazi, Wizkid, Fireboy DML, Buju, Enny, Tiwa Savage, Darkovibes, Kofi Jamar, Joey B, Amaarae, Obongjayar, Moliy, Mellissa, Teezee, Zamir, Fresh L, Victony, and Afro Nation.

== Artistry ==
Boj credits artists such as Wyclef Jean, Lauryn Hill, Bob Marley, Fela Kuti, Lagbaja, and Sean Paul as his musical influences. Boj is widely recognized as one of the pioneers of the fusion genre Alté, which incorporates musical influences from afrobeats, dancehall, reggae, hip hop, and alternative R&B. The term was first coined by Boj on his 2014 song "Paper", and was later used to describe left-field styles of music. Boj said in an interview that the term alté means "freedom to express yourself without boundaries, without the constraints of the mainstream in whatever sector, whether that's fashion, whether that's music, whether that's photography, whatever it is man."

== Discography ==
=== Studio albums ===
Title	Album details
Magic	Released: 13 October 2017; Label: HF Music; Format: Digital download, streaming
Gbagada Express	Released: 22 April 2022; Label: Moves Recordings; Format: Digital download, streaming
Gbagada Express Vol 2: Moving Mad	Released: 2 June 2023; Label: Moves Recordings; Format: Digital download, streaming
12 Summers	Released: 25 July 2024; Label: Action Boyz, Moves Recordings; Format: Digital download, streaming
Duplicity	Released: 5 December 2025; Label: Action Boyz, Moves Recordings; Format: Digital download, streaming

=== Extended plays ===
Title	Album details
Make E No Cause Fight (with Ajebutter22)	Released: 17 May 2018; Label: Jungle Entertainment Ventures; Format: Digital download, streaming
Make E No Cause Fight 2 (with Ajebutter22 & Falz)	Released: 29 November 2019; Label: Jungle Entertainment Ventures; Format: Digital download, streaming
Make E No Cause Fight 3 (with Ajebutter22)	Released: 17 November 2023; Label: Action Boyz, MOVES Recordings; Format: Digital download, streaming

=== Mixtapes ===
Title	Album details
#BOTM	Released: 21 February 2014; Deluxe: 13 April 2016; Label: Jungle Entertainment Ventures; Format: Digital download, streaming

== Tours ==
=== Supporting ===
- Chapter One Tour (with Falana) (2019)

== Concerts ==
- One Mic Naija (2015)
- Gidi Culture Festival (2017)
- Porkoyum Food Fest (2018)
- Jameson Connect Independence Day (2018)
- ART X Lagos (2018)
- Tiger's “Uncage Party” (2019)
- Afro Nation (2021)

=== Co-headlining ===
- COPA Lagos (with Seyi Shay, Naeto C, and Falz) (2016)
- Nativeland (with Skepta, J Hus, Burna Boy) (2016)
- Our Homecoming (with Black Sherif, Fireboy DML, and BNXN) (2022)
- Afro Nation (with Machel Montano, Olamide, Wande Coal, Chronixx, Kizz Daniel, Naira Marley, Tory Lanez, Maitre Gims, and Teni) (2020)

=== Supporting ===
- Our Homecoming (with Nonso Amadi) (2015)
- Gidi Culture Festival (with Ycee) (2016)
- OLIC2 (with Olamide) (2016)
- rare Live concert (with Odunsi (The Engine)) (2018)
- The Redtv Rave (with Burna Boy, Jidenna and Olamide) (2019)
