= Alté =

Music genre

- Stylistic origins: Afrobeats; dancehall; reggae; alternative R&B; hip hop
- Cultural origins: 2010s, Nigeria
- Typical instruments: Bass guitar; Synthesizer; keyboard; Drum machine; vocals; Acoustic guitar

Regional scenes
- Nigeria

Alté (locally pronounced as "ahl-teh") is a fusion genre of music that combines elements of afrobeats, dancehall, reggae, hip hop, and alternative R&B. The term was coined in the 2010s by Nigerian music group DRB LasGidi, meaning alternative and "individualistic and non-traditional modes of self-expression" through music and fashion.

== Characteristics ==
Alté fuses a wide array of musical influences from afrobeats, rap, R&B, soul, dancehall, and others. The term was coined by DRB LasGidi members and was first heard on Boj's 2014 song "Paper"; it was later used to describe left-field styles of music. TeeZee explained about the term saying "Alté is Nigerian lingo for 'alternative' which means freedom of expression essentially through any medium. It has been going on since the 1960s as Nigerians always experimented with music. It became recognized as a style or genre from about 2012 upwards and it broke into the mainstream in 2016 with the rise of its new stars." Its fashion culture has been inspired by the early 2000s, and its music videos have been inspired by 1990s Nollywood horror drama.

== History ==
The alté movement started around 2007 as exposure to the internet became prevalent among young Nigerians. The mid-2010s saw the emergence of the musical genre from DRB LasGidi members TeeZee, BOJ, and Fresh L. The style gained commercial success in the late 2010s with other alté artists and pioneers including: Cruel Santino, Odunsi (The Engine), Zamir, Tems, Lady Donli, Bloxxom, Nonso Amadi, Ibejii, Tay Iwar, Amaarae, WANI, Wavy the Creator, Blue Ivan and Tomi Agape. In 2017, Show Dem Camp released the song "Popping Again" featuring Boj and Odunsi (The Engine), with the music video showcasing the alté generation's stylistic culture.

== Success ==
Commercially, the genre has gained success, with a few of its artists making it into the American and British charts. On 13 June 2023, the Recording Academy added a new category titled Best African Music Performance, in which it stated genres eligible for the category to include Alté. These nominees will no longer be limited to other genres such as Afrobeats.

=== Impact ===
On 24 June 2022, the initial release of the Nigerian film Glamour Girls, a sequel to 1994's Glamour Girls, features (97%) alté songs on its soundtrack.
