= A True Champion =

Studio album by Rexxie
- Released: 28 June 2021
- Genre: Amapiano; afropiano; afropop; alternative pop
- Length: 40:00
- Label: Hitxlab; Dxpper
- Producer: Rexxie (also exec.)

Rexxie chronology
Afro Streets (2020)	A True Champion (2021)	Nataraja (2021)

Singles from A True Champion
- 1. "KPK (Ko Por Ke)" Released: 4 December 2020; 2. "All" Released: 25 June 2021

A True Champion is the debut studio album by Nigerian record producer and songwriter Rexxie. It was released on 28 June 2021 by Hitxlab and was distributed by Dvpper Music. The 17-track album features guest appearances from Davido, Naira Marley, Teni, Zlatan, Peruzzi, MohBad, Bad Boy Timz, Zinoleesky, Bella Shmurda, BNXN, Oxlade, Lyta, T-Classic, Blanche Bailly, Sarkodie, Ms Banks, Moelogo, Kida Kudz, and Midas the Jagaban. The album blends elements from amapiano, and afropop, occasionally incorporating neo-soul-influenced percussive rhythms.

== Background ==
Rexxie began his musical training as a child, playing piano at his father's church in Anambra State. He started producing music around 2010, initially making beats for friends, before gaining wider attention in 2018 after producing Chinko Ekun's single "Able God" featuring Lil Kesh and Zlatan. His working relationships with Zlatan and Naira Marley began that same year and contributed to the mainstream spread of the zanku sound, leading up to the release of his debut album A True Champion. Rexxie described his sound, which he refers to as "Afro-streets" (also the name of his previous project), as a blend of traditional melodies and rhythmic percussion aimed at the dance floor.

Originally scheduled for release in May 2021, it was supported by the singles "KPK (Ko Por Ke)" and "All". The former is an afropiano collaboration with late singer and rapper MohBad, and was released as the album's lead single on 4 December 2020. They performed the song live on AKtivated Sessions on 17 December 2020. "KPK (Ko Por Ke)" peaked at #8 on the UK Afrobeats Singles Chart during the week of 21 March 2021. The song's music video, directed by WG Films, depicts Rexxie and MohBad in a competitive setting at a race course. The video blends elements of Lagos nightlife and fan culture, with dancers performing steps linked to "marlian culture" and spectators gathered around the artists. The song spawned a remix with South African rapper Sho Madjozi, which was also included on A True Champion. On 25 June 2021, he released the Davido-assisted "All" as the album's second single. He announced the song's release the day before via his Instagram page.

== Composition ==
The album built on Rexxie's signature afropiano sound, fused amapiano elements with the zanku style within Afrobeats. An early example of this approach was "KPK", released in December 2020, which recorded over 50 million streams across major digital platforms. The album opens with "Frenemies," a composition by Oxlade that relies heavily on percussion and uses a brief acoustic solo in the song's closing seconds to reflect on harmful rivalries. On "Boi Boi," Teni delivers a catchy tune and preaches the don't-be-stupid gospel over a keyboard-heavy beat reminiscent of Dr. Sid's "Pop Something." Sarkodie performs two verses in his native language Twi on "Mofoti 2.0," while Naira Marley contributes a chant that shifts the song's tone. "Banger" features minimal lyrics and draws influence from South African club music samples, enlisting assistance from Asake.

== Critical reception ==
Professional ratings
Review scores
Source	Rating
Nigerian Entertainment Today	5.9/10
Pulse Nigeria	6.0/10

A True Champion received mixed reviews from music critics. Jerry Chiemeke, writing for Nigerian Entertainment Today wrote that "when talking about the continent’s finest music producers, it would be impossible to leave Rexxie out of the conversation," but concluded that the album relied too much on features, lacked cohesion and novelty, and was "listenable, but it could have been ten minutes shorter, and it is hardly memorable," rating it 5.9/10.

Pulse Nigeria writer Motolani Alake said Rexxie had "written his name into the sands of Nigerian sonic times" and viewed the album as a feature-driven producer project with strong sequencing and hit potential, but concluded that it was too long, repetitive in sound, and "not a spectacular body of work," rating it 6.0/10. In a review for The Native, Dennis Ade Peter stated that showed his range and growth as a producer rooted in street-hop and amapiano, describing it as "a victory lap" and concluding that although "he doesn't utter a word or sing a melody," "he’s the loudest star of them all here." Tayo Odutola of Earmilk noted that Rexxie used A True Champion to show his range as a producer across dancefloor styles and collaborations, saying it was "a sonic display of his gifts to the world" and concluding that it showed his "proficiency in crafting world-class audio bangers."

== Track listing ==
All tracks produced by Rexxie.

A True Champion track listing
No.	Title	Writer(s)	Length
1.	"Frenemies" (featuring Oxlade)	Chisom Ezeh; Olaitan Ikuforiji	2:53
2.	"Boi Boi" (featuring Teni)	Ezeh; Teniola Apata	2:47
3.	"Mofoti 2.0" (featuring Naira Marley and Sarkodie)	Ezeh; Azeez Fashola; Michael Addo	3:15
4.	"Banger" (featuring Asake)	Ezeh; Ahmed Ololade	2:40
5.	"Motherland" (featuring Kida Kudz)	Ezeh; Olukayode Odesanya	2:48
6.	"KPK (Ko Por Ke)" (with MohBad)	Ezeh; Ilerioluwa Aloba	3:11
7.	"Back2Back" (featuring Bella Shmurda)	Ezeh; Abiola Akinbiyi	2:55
8.	"Birthday" (featuring Bnxn and Moelogo)	Ezeh; Daniel Benson; Mohammed Animashaun	3:04
9.	"Booty Bounce" (featuring Bad Boy Timz and Ms Banks)	Ezeh; Olorunyomi Oloruntimilehin; Thrya Oji	3:06
10.	"Hobby" (featuring Peruzzi)	Ezeh; Tobechukwu Okoh	2:49
11.	"Zanku 2.0" (featuring Zlatan)	Ezeh; Omoniyi Raphael	3:23
12.	"40 BTC" (featuring Seyi Vibez)	Ezeh; Oluwaseyi Balogun	3:27
13.	"Ginger Me" (featuring Midas the Jagaban and Zinoleesky)	Ezeh; Florence Bajomo; Azeez Oniyide	3:43
14.	"All" (featuring Davido)	Ezeh; David Adeleke	2:36
15.	"KPK (Ko Por Ke)" (remix; featuring Sho Madjozi and Mohbad)	Ezeh; Maya Wegerif; Aloba	3:14
16.	"For You" (featuring Lyta and Emo Grae)	Ezeh; Opeyemi Rahim; Opeyemi Edebie	3:46
17.	"Champion" (featuring T-Classic and Blanche Bailly)	Ezeh; Tolulope Ajayi; Blanche Bailly	2:58
Total length:			40:00

== Release history ==
Region	Date	Format	Version	Label	Ref
Various	28 June 2021	CD, digital download	Standard	Hitxlab; Dvpper Music	
