= Pop rap =

Music genre combining hip-hop with pop

- Other names: Pop hip-hop; hip-pop; melodic hip-hop; rap pop; melodic rap
- Stylistic origins: Pop; hip-hop
- Cultural origins: Late 1980s, New York City
- Typical instruments: Drum machine; electronic drums; drums; synthesizer; electric guitar; bass guitar; keyboards; rapping; sampler; robotic voice effects; vocoder; talkbox; singing

Subgenres
- Trap-pop

Other topics
- Alternative hip-hop; Eurodance; new jack swing

Pop rap (also known as pop hip-hop, pop hop, hip pop, melodic hip-hop, or melodic rap) is a genre of music fusing the rhythm-based lyricism of hip-hop with pop's preference for melodic vocals, catchy hooks, and occasional rap-singing on pop-like productions and structure, as well as samples of various popular songs. This genre gained mainstream popularity during the 1990s, though the influences and roots of pop rap can trace back to late-1980s hip-hop artists such as Run-DMC, LL Cool J, and Beastie Boys.

== Characteristics ==
AllMusic describes pop rap as "a marriage of hip-hop beats and raps with strong melodic hooks, which are usually featured as part of the chorus section in a standard pop-song structure." Pop rap also tends to have less aggressive lyrics than street-level rap music. However, some 1990s artists fused pop rap with a more aggressive attitude to defuse backlash on their own accessibility. Music journalist Wilson McBee has strongly criticized pop rap, "A pop rapper is assumed to be a sellout – someone who has compromised artistic principles in order to fit commercial expectations. Or worse, it's someone who never had any artistic principles to begin with, who's guilty of bastardizing rap's social and political traditions just to make money." McBee also then went on saying "In labeling the likes of Flo Rida, Lupae Filius and other pop rappers, we blur the distinction between a 'pop rapper' and a rapper who is just really popular. Not every rapper who has a hit is automatically a sellout or deserving of the pop rap tag." While some rappers from the 1990s with catchy hooks have been compared to pop music, McBee also said:

In 1994, both Coolio's "Fantastic Voyage" and Notorious B.I.G.'s "Big Poppa" were big hits. Both featured plush, synthesizer-heavy production, catchy hooks and lyrics about partying. But the songs are not even close to being siblings. Coolio's awkward verses are nearly void of internal rhyming, interesting metaphors or lyrical variation whatsoever. The imagery is tired, vague and familiar: “We’re going to a place where everybody kick it/ Kick it, kick it . . . yeah that’s the ticket.” Compare that with these vivid lines from Biggie: “So we can steam on the way to the telly, go fill my belly / A T-bone steak, cheese eggs and Welch’s grape.” "Big Poppa" may have a poppy melody and beat, but it is still the work of a masterful lyricist and storyteller.

Pop rap songs often have lyrical content similar to that in pop with themes such as love and relationships.

== History ==
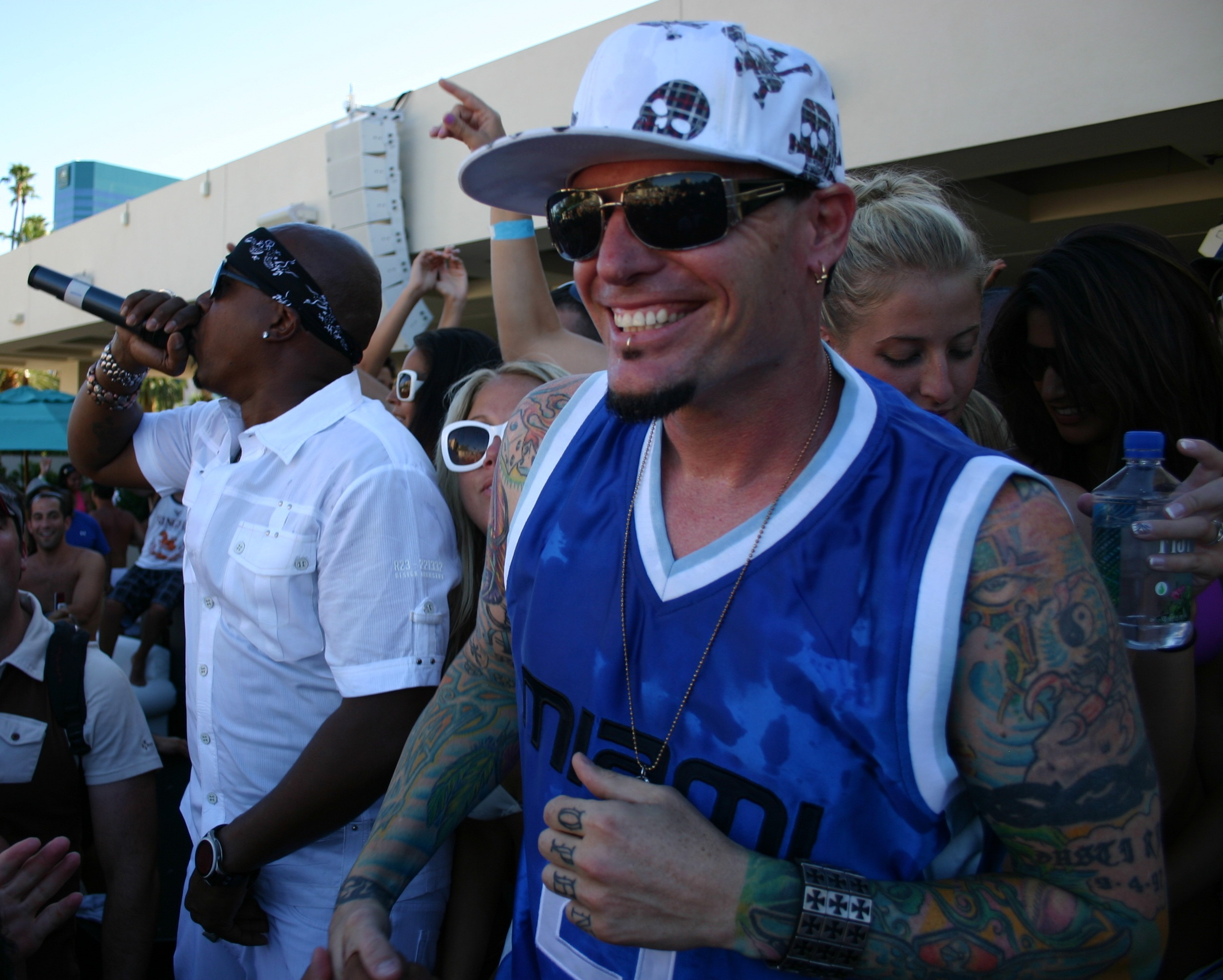
MC Hammer performing with Vanilla Ice in July 2009, who were both described as early pop rap artists for blending rap music with catchy hooks.

In the 1980s, rap artists including Run-DMC and LL Cool J set up the blueprints and origins of pop rap as they suddenly broke into the mainstream. LL Cool J has been described as the first "pop rapper" in history, when he rose to prominence on his 1985 debut album Radio. Paramount-owned music video channel MTV has described LL Cool J's 1987 single "I Need Love" as "one of the first pop rap crossover hits". Later, rap artists such as Tone Loc, Young MC, and Fresh Prince then made party tunes and used their storytelling abilities as they became popular. During the 1990s, pop rap began to expand even more as hip-hop music also began to connect strongly with dance music and R&B.

In the early 1990s, MC Hammer and Vanilla Ice broke into the mainstream with songs such as "U Can't Touch This" and "Ice Ice Baby", respectively, but the two sampled from both songs of the 1980s. They caused pop rap to be "derided (and, occasionally, taken to court) for its willingness to borrow" from best-known hit singles. Another important moment was the remix of Mariah Carey's 1995 song "Fantasy" with Ol' Dirty Bastard.

By the end of the 1990s and early 2000s, rappers such as Ja Rule fused gangsta rap themes with 1980s pop and soul elements; pop rap was dominated by many artists. It then went back into the mainstream with the success of the Black Eyed Peas who had smash singles such as "Where Is the Love?" (2003) from their breakthrough album Elephunk.

During the late 2000s and early 2010s, many rap artists who used pop rap in their music had emerged such as Nicki Minaj, Drake, will.i.am from the Black Eyed Peas, LMFAO, Illslick, Flo Rida, Pitbull and Wiz Khalifa.

== Social acceptance ==
Most people who listen to pop rap do not call it pop rap, and simply consider it rap. When Spotify introduced the pop rap category in 2019, Twitter users were confused as to what this "new" genre suggested. Some users were even bewildered when Spotify classified the genre for its users and suggested that they listen to pop rap. Popular hip-hop rapper LL Cool J did not embrace the idea of labeling him as the "forefather of pop rap" and tweeted about it in April 2021.

== Stylistic differences ==
=== Street pop ===
Street pop, also known as street hop, is an experimental rap-vocal musical style which emerged in Lagos, evolving from a blend of Nigerian hip-hop, popular music, afrobeats, and Nigerian street music. Influenced by artists such as Danfo Drivers, Baba Fryo and Daddy Showkey well as the shaku shaku dance style, originally inspired by gqom and later evolving into its own music genre. Street pop is characterized by its lively tempos and incorporates elements from gqom, highlife, pop, hip-hop, and EDM. While typically fast-paced, slower variations of street pop are also prevalent. It features a fusion of melodious arrangements, urban colloquial language, Pidgin, singing, indigenous and Western rap. Variants of street pop include neo-fuji, shaku shaku and zanku. Key figures in the street pop genre include Olamide, Slimcase, Mr Real, Idowest, Naira Marley, Zinoleesky, Mohbad, Balloranking, Reminisce, Rexxie, Zlatan Ibile, Sarz, 9ice, Lil Kesh, T.I Blaze, Asake, Portable, Bella Shmurda, Seyi Vibez and DJ Kaywise.
