= Death of MohBad =

2023 death of a Nigerian musician

#Justice4MohBad
- Date: 12 September 2023; 3 years ago
- Location: Lagos, Nigeria
- Type: Inconclusive autopsy result
- Deaths: MohBad

On 12 September 2023, Nigerian musician MohBad died in Lagos, at the age of 27.

#Justice4MohBad became a social movement and protest following his death and subsequent allegations about the events that led to it.

== Prior events ==
On 10 September 2023, MohBad was last seen at the D'General Bitters Ikorodu show, where he performed with Zlatan, Seun Kuti, Poco Lee, Nasboi, DJ 4kerty, and the event host Do2dtun, in the lineup for the event. Other persons in attendance at the show include the CEO of D'General Bitters, Soso Berekon, and Cubana Chief Priest.

== Circumstances ==
On 25 September 2023, Perez Medcare Hospital released a statement confirming MohBad was pronounced dead on arrival at the hospital.

We consider it pertinent to put on record that at about 04:30 pm on the 12th of September 2023, the lifeless body of Mr. Ilerioluwa Oladimeji Aloba (AKA Mohbad) was brought to our medical facility and our medical team immediately sprang into action and after assessment, it was discovered that there was no sign of life, no central or peripheral pulse, no heartbeat, no recordable vital signs, and his pupils were fixed and dilated. On attempting CPR (Cardiopulmonary Resuscitation), rigor mortis (stiffening of some parts of the body in relation to death) was observed and the persons who brought him to our facility were informed that it was a case of BID (Brought in dead). Upon inquiry about the circumstances leading to the emergency, our team was informed that the deceased was being treated at home by a nurse and that she administered injections to him.

— Perez Medcare Hospital, on the death of MohBad.

== Investigation ==
MohBad's death is an ongoing investigation led by Lagos Police Command. On 19 September 2023, the state Governor Babajide Sanwo-Olu invited Department of State Services (DSS) to join the ongoing investigation. MohBad's body was exhumed by the Lagos State Police Command on 21 September 2023. The autopsy was carried out and completed in the same day. On 22 September 2023, the Lagos State Police Public Relations Officer, Benjamin Hundeyin, in an interview with Punch newspapers, confirmed Mohbad's body was in the mortuary. On 24 September 2023, PRO Benjamin Hundeyin, issued a stern warning which reads, “The investigation will not be turned into a media trial”.

On 28 September 2023, Lagos State Police Command confirmed that Sam Larry was in custody and assisting with the ongoing investigation.

In September 2026, Inspector-General of Police Tunji Disu approved a request from the Aloba family to reopen the investigation into MohBad's death, transferring the case to the Special Enquiry Bureau of the Lagos State Police Command. The decision drew mixed reactions from the public, with fans and commentators welcoming a fresh forensic approach while others expressed confusion over conflicting legal timelines.

== Allegations involving the Marlian Music ==
=== Assault and contract termination ===
On 5 October 2022, MohBad told the public, "I’m dying inside, and being physically assaulted under Naira Marley’s label". Shortly after MohBad made the claim, Naira Marley dismissed MohBad's claim, 'adding that he was "high" when making the assault allegation'. On 6 October 2022, Mohbad gave details to his claim, saying "Naira Marley asked his boys to beat me for demanding a new manager". On 25 October 2022, MohBad terminated his contract with Marlian Music signed by his lawyer O.M. Falade, who issued the document to Marlian Music. In the document issued to Marlian Music, Mohbad claims he was physically attacked violently and has received life threats from Naira Marley. The document also stated that Marlian Music has not fulfilled the terms of the contract signed in 2019, and they had also failed to pay all royalties due to MohBad.

=== Unpaid royalties ===
Following his death, MohBad's management publicly requested the release of MohBad's royalties with Naira Marley's Marlian Music. On 22 September 2023, Nigerian journalist Kemi Omololu-Olunloyo claimed that "Mohbad wrote 97% percent of all Marlian Music, and I discovered that as of today MohBad is worth ₦700M, roughly around $690,000. Naira Marley's Marlian Music owes him ₦300M in song royalties".

=== Airplay ban ===
On 18 September 2023, Marlian Music catalogues which include Naira Marley and Zinoleesky were placed on ban from airplay by several radio and television stations in Nigeria, including Splash FM in Ibadan, who also ordered the ban to take effect across other radio stations in Oyo state. On 20 September 2023, Fresh 106.9 FM Ado Ekiti reportedly banned the airplay of all songs released under the Marlian Music and urged other radio stations to also ban their records. Ebonyi Broadcasting Television banned Naira Marley Marlian's recordings and evacuation of Marlian's studio albums from their studio. Invicta 98.9 FM also directed its employees to stop airplay of all the songs produced by the label effectively. Other radio stations that have also placed a ban on his songs include Island FM, Okin FM, Divine FM, and Agidigbo. On 21 September 2023, Okin 105.7FM Offa placed bans on Naira's songs On the same day, Kaduna reportedly banned all songs from Marlian Music from the radio. Cable TV like MTV Base and Soundcity also banned Malian Music.

=== Shows cancellation ===
On 18 September 2023, Fathia Entertainment announced the cancellation of Zinoleesky's US tour, which was to be held in 10 cities including Washington DC, New York, Atlanta, Dallas, Houston, Chicago, Cleveland, Los Angeles, Boston, and Indianapolis, beginning on 30 September 2023. A day after, Nigerian record producer Samklef set out to see all of Marlian's international shows get canceled following the death of MohBad.

== Family and close friends of Mohbad ==
=== Family reaction ===
My son didn’t die a natural death; he was killed. Whoever killed my son, that person’s home will become troubled. They will face war and curses. The glory of the child in their home will diminish because of those who killed him and their sons. I am not dead; I am alive. My son didn’t find rest, and I couldn’t speak up whenever he was falsely accused because I wasn’t given the chance.I asked my son what happened, and he gave me money to go to the hospital. I called him from the hospital, and he told me, ‘Mummy, something is happening.’ I called him to come home and tell me what happened. I am his life and heaven. He said he came home because he heard something had happened. He said he was taken and given water, and then he didn’t know what happened to him anymore. Since then, I’ve been on the matter. Since then, I’ve been on it. He died in fear. The fear was too much. If he was supposed to go to some shows, he couldn’t go because of the fear that some people were coming. He was beaten every day, and I was receiving calls even from people I didn’t know. I didn’t rest until he was killed.

— MohBad's Mom

His dad said, "Don’t blame Naira Marley for my son’s death, as I tried my best to reach Naira Marley, but everything was in vain. When this issue happened, I wanted to treck to his house, but I was scared because I didn't know what I would meet there".

His mom believed her son was murdered, and not killed by any ear infection. According to Instablog, she believed his exit from Naira Marley's label Marlian Music led to his many troubles and death.

My child will be crying all the time. They will be beating him whenever he goes for a show. A show he is supposed to go for he will not be able to attend the show. Sam Larry, I don't know who that is. I don't know anybody. I don't know any strong person. I have seen you people now You have promised me. Help me find Naira out, he used my son as a slave. When my son was with Naira, he never gave me money. Please help me find him out. My child will be telling me please do not let them kill me. I will also be telling him that I know people and that I will meet some people. He will tell me Please do not allow them to kill me.

— Help Me Look For Naira Marley – MohBad's Mom,

=== Friends' reactions ===
Bella Shmurda, who was MohBad's best friend, vows to see justice for his death legally or illegally. In a series of tweets, Bella has called for the arrest of Naira Marley and his associate, Sam Larry, over the death of MohBad. In January 2023, Bella revealed on a podcast titled #WithChude about a suicide attempted by MohBad, telling Chude Jideonwo, "Mohbad attempted to jump out of the window of his house before he was spotted by his girlfriend whose timely intervention prevented the suicide attempt".

Badman will never rest. King of South and the West… I wont pay any last respect because you still alive 4L. Until those who oppressed him face justice and sentenced, nothing like last respect. Igboro be aware #justice4Mohbad.

— Bella Shmurda tweeted,

== Public reaction ==
=== Media and Internet coverage ===
On 12 September 2023, a Nigerian entertainment blog widely known as GistLover first broke the news of the death of MohBad. On 13 September 2023, according to GistLover, the person who called them said "MohBad was last seen at a show in Ikorodu, where he was hit with Juju (aka. supernatural power)". On 17 September 2023, a Nigerian music blog NaijaLoaded reportedly published a Fidelity Bank transaction receipt from the CEO of D'General Bitters, Soso Berekon supporting MohBad’s Son with ₦2 million.

On 19 September 2023, an auxiliary nurse who administered an anti-Tetanus vaccine on MohBad was disclosed to have been arrested by the Nigerian Police. The Nigerian actress Iyabo Ojo disclosed the information on her Instagram Live after her visit to the Lagos State Police Commissioner CP Abiodun Alabi. On 23 September 2023, the National Association of Nigeria Nurses and Midwives announced in a statement released stating that nurse who administered the injection is not a licensed nurse.

On 24 September 2023, Nigerian Tribune journalist Segun Adebayo published an article about Naira Marley under pressure to return to Nigeria, and the article was shortly deleted. The journalist wrote, "Marley who many people accused of being responsible for Mohbad’s death is said to have grown tired of being fingered in his former protégé’s death and may jet back into the country this weekend".

=== Record streams ===
MohBad's record streams increased 702% between September 12 – 14 2023, according to TurnTable during the last tracking week of music recorded by TurnTable charts in Nigeria which ends on Thursday and begins on Friday. TurnTable reportedly stated, "The Singer's catalog of songs collected 8.02 million on-demand streams – up from 999,000 on-demand streams the previous week (September 1 – 7)." On 15 September 2023, MohBad's single "Peace", released under Marlian Music, reached number 1 on Apple Music in Nigeria and was accompanied by his single "Ask About Me", released under his label Imolenization at number 2, "Beast & Peace" the opening track on Blessed extended play at number four and his "Feel Good" single at the fifth position. On the week of 23 September 2023, "Peace" debuted on Billboard Hot Trending Songs Powered by X at number 2.

On 18 September 2023, MohBad's extended play Blessed reached a new peak at number 4 and his first extended play Light made its first chart entry at number 20 in Nigeria Official Top 50 Albums. On 21 September 2023, according to Plus TV Africa MohBad's extended play Blessed gained over 530% on Streaming platforms. On 23 September 2023, he became the 46th best-selling digital artist in the world, surpassing international artists such as Nicki Minaj, Eminem, 21 Savage, Lady Gaga, and Chris Brown.

In 2023, MohBad set a new Spotify record with "Peace" after the demise. On 26 September 2023, "Peace" peaked at number 23 on Billboard U.S. Afrobeats Songs.

=== Aftermath ===
On 14 September 2023, a man who identified as a member of a cultist group in Ikorodu threatened to kill Naira Marley in a viral video if ever seen in Ikorodu.

=== Tributes ===
On 14 September 2023, Davido paid tribute to Mohbad at his Manchester show 'Timeless'. On 18 September 2023, Femi Adebayo, and Toyin Abraham paid tribute to Mohbad. On 19 September 2023, Khaid paid tribute to him and promised his son ₦2 million, then went on to release "Forever", which he dedicated to him. He also revealed that Mohbad's immediate family will receive 100% royalties from it. On 21 September 2023, Meek Mill, Lil Durk, and Kodak Black paid tribute. On 22 September 2023, MohBad was displayed on Times Square's billboard in New York. On 23 September 2023, Don Jazzy, Oxlade, and Rema got smoked over late tribute to MohBad.

== #Justice4MohBad ==
The campaigners moved from social media using the #Justice4MohBad hashtag to an organized candlelight procession in Lagos held on 21 September 2023 commencing from Lekki Phase 1 Gate at 5 pm and terminating at Muri Okunola Park, Victoria Island, Lagos at 8 pm, where a musical concert was held, with Zlatan, Falz, Davido, and Shallipopi among others in attendance. On 22 September 2023, Abuja youths held a tribute concert at Unity Fountain. On 24 September 2023, Awka residents held a candlelight procession at 5 pm in Ekwueme Square, and another candlelight procession was held on the same day, organized by his best friend Bella Shmurda in Canada. During the candlelight procession, Bella said, “My mum had to call me not to come back to Nigeria yet. I understand what she’s saying”.

=== Protest ===
On 19 September 2023, Lagos State joined the Justice for MohBad protest. On 20 September 2023, Ogun State, Oyo State, Kwara State, and Ondo State joined the protest demanding justice for Mohbad, followed by Bayelsa State and Ekiti State on 21 September 2023. On 22 September 2023, Delta State protesters demanded a DNA test on MohBad's son. In Nairobi, London, and New York, there was a peaceful protest through the cities in demand for justice.

== Burial ==
On 13 September 2023, MohBad was buried in his hometown in Ikorodu, less than 24 hours after his death. According to Joseph Aloba, MohBad's dad; "In Yoruba land, his corpse is not the kind to be kept when both of his parents are still alive. That land where Mohbad was buried is his", he narrates during an interview with Temilola Sobola.
