= Biesloaded =

Nigerian online music and entertainment website & platform

Biesloaded NG
- Website type: Entertainment, Music
- Available in: English
- Founded: 2013
- Headquarters: Lagos, Nigeria
- Founder: Adewumi Adeyanju; Ojimi Ayomide
- Website: www.biesloaded.ng
- Advertising: Yes
- Registration: Optional
- Launched: 2017
- Current status: Active
- Written in: HTML, JavaScript, CSS

Biesloaded or Biesloaded NG, is a Nigerian street music platform founded in 2013 by Adewumi Adeyanju and Ojimi Ayomide on Instagram. In 2017, the platform launched its website. Its also known as one of Nigeria's top street music platforms. In 2022, it began operating as an entertainment company, shortly after partnering with Zlatan's Zanku Records.

== History ==
Biesloaded was formed in 2013 by founders Adewumi Adeyanju and Ojimi Ayomide, with the sole aim of promoting street music culture and its lingo. In 2021, Adewumi released "Ma Gbo" a street music featuring Payan Boi and DJ Shizzy. The street lingo "Watimagbo" which means "You should have heard" was first heard on the song and was later reused by Davido on Adekunle Gold song "High".

Biesloaded has been credited for promoting MohBad before he achieved fame. It released "Blogger Blogger" featuring Kabex and MohBad, days after MohBad signed with Naira Marley's Marlian Records. Its platform has featured Rexxie, Zlatan, Davido, Naira Marley, Seyi Vibez, Asake, Burna Boy, and dancer Poco Lee. As of 20 May 2024, it has reached 1.3 million followers on Instagram.
