= Niphkeys =

Nigerian record producer

- Born: Adebajo Oluwanifemi Adebanjo; 6 March 1994 (age 32); Agege, Lagos, Nigeria
- Genres: Afropop; Afrobeats; Afropiano; African hip-hop
- Occupation: Record producer
- Years active: 2016–present
- Labels: Soundhub; Empire

Adebajo Oluwanifemi Adebanjo (born 6 March 1994), professionally known as Niphkeys, is a Nigerian record producer. Niphkeys started music professionally as a producer in 2016 and has worked with BNXN, Naira Marley, MohBad, Zinoleesky and other artists.

== Early life and education ==
Adebajo Oluwanifemi Adebanjo a native of Odogbolu, Ogun State was born on 6 March 1994, in Agege, Lagos to a "musically inclined" Christian family as the second of three children. Growing up, Niphkeys played the piano, guitar, bass and talking drum. He attended Legacy Villa Primary School in Alagbado, for his primary education and proceed to Good Shepherd Comprehensive High School and Providence Heights School for his junior and senior secondary education all in Lagos State. He subsequently graduated from Federal University of Agriculture, Abeokuta with a first-class honour in Soil Science.

== Career ==
Niphkeys is a 2020 graduate of the Ejoya Music program which trained musicians such as BNXN, YKB and Emo Grae. Niphkeys who was a pianist in church started his profession as a music producer in 2016 at the age of 22, but received mainstream attention in 2020 following the release of Naira Marley' single "Koleyewon" and "Kilofeshe" by Zinoleesky. In his early days, Niphkeys idolised Kanye West and his music production and cites Young John and Pheelz as his inspirations.

In 2023, he collaborated with Stormzy and Rema for a remix of "Hide & Seek". Prior to this, he produced songs for and collaborated with Zinoleesky, BNXN, Zlatan, Naira Marley, MohBad, Reekado Banks, Seyi Vibez and others.

In 2022, Niphkeys was picked as the number one "hottest music producer of the year" by Pulse Nigeria for 2021. In the same year, he received three nominations in at 2022 Headies Award; two for the "Street Pop Song of the Year" category and one in the "Producer of the Year" category for MohBad's "Feel Good".
