= Kolade Dominate =

Nigerian on-air personality

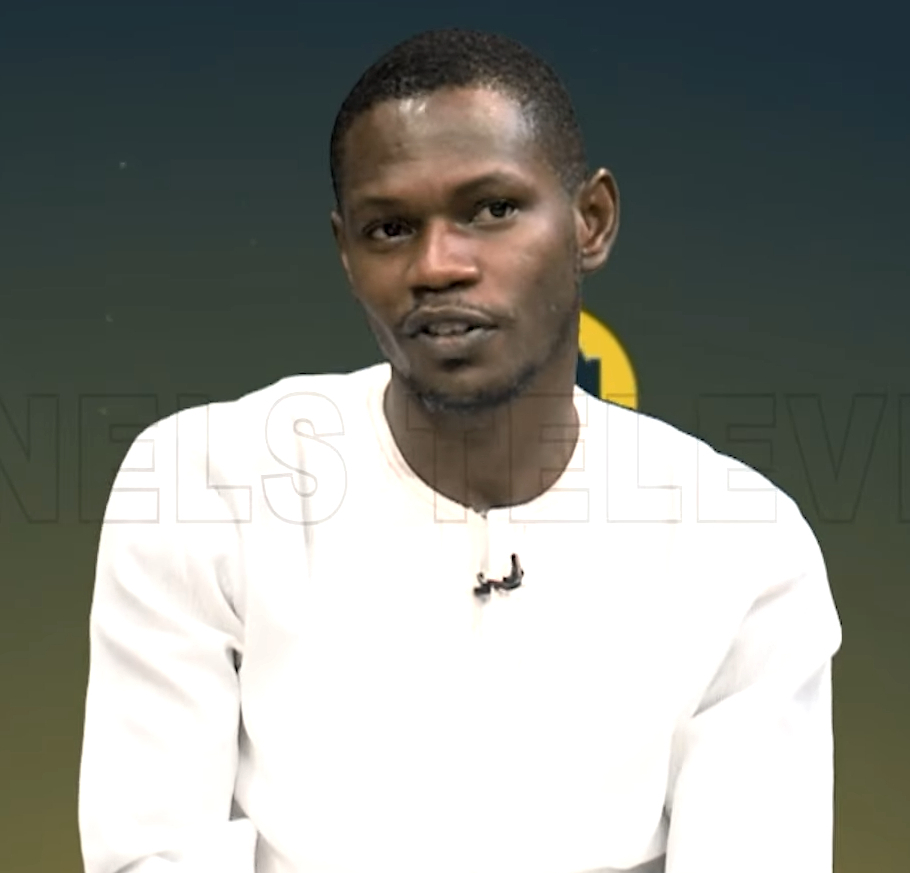
- Kolade Dominate In 2025
- Born: Victor Akolade Olowu; 8 October 1992 (age 33); Ijebu, Ogun State, Nigeria
- Other names: Mr. Dominate; Kolade
- Occupations: Radio Presenter; Singer-songwriter; Talent Manager
- Years active: 2013–present
- Organizations: Inspiration 92. 3 FM Lagos; Lasgidi 90.1 FM; 1008 World
- Television: Africa Independent Television; MITV
- Awards: The Beatz Awards

Victor Akolade Olowu (born October 8, 1992) known professionally as Kolade Dominate, is a Nigerian radio presenter, media practitioner, and talent manager. He serves as the General Manager of Lasgidi 90.1 FM in Lagos and serves as Deputy Head of Broadcast Services at Inspiration 92.3 FM.

Olowu was nominated for The Beatz Awards On-Air Personality of the Year in 2021, and later won the category in 2024.

== Early life ==
Olowu was born on 8 October 1992 in Ijebu, Ogun State, Nigeria. He attended Mayflower School in Ikenne before studying presentation at the Federal Radio Corporation of Nigeria. He later obtained a degree in digital multimedia technology from Highland College of Technology and a degree in mass communication from the Institut Supérieur de Communication et de Gestion and Université Protestante de l’Afrique de l’Ouest in Porto Novo, Benin.

== Career ==
=== Radio ===
Olowu began his radio career in 2013 at Star FM Lagos, where he met disc jockey Segun “Shy Shy” and worked as a presenter. He later joined Raypower FM Lagos and then Raypower FM Ibadan, where he hosted shows including Ultimate Morning Show, Raypower Lounge, Soul Serenade, and Power Play.

In 2018, he moved to Splash 105.5 FM in Ibadan, where he presented programs such as Smooth Home Drive, Morning Splash Xtra, The Splash Music Box, and The Spotlight. On The Spotlight, he hosted Afrobeats artists including 2Baba, D’banj, Fireboy, Joeboy, DJ Neptune, DJ Jimmy Jatt, DJ Kaywise, Teni, 9ice, ID Cabasa, Omah Lay, Mayorkun, Oxlade, Tems, Chike, CDQ, and Crayon. He resigned in December 2020 and joined Inspiration 92.3 FM Lagos, where he began hosting the Breakfast Jam. In 2020, he joined Inspiration FM Lagos as host of the Breakfast Jam.

In 2017, he received the MAYA Award for On-Air Personality of the Year. The following year, he won both the Eminence Award and the Cool Wealth Award, and he received the Cool Wealth Award again in 2020. In 2021, he was nominated for The Beatz Award in the On-Air Personality of the Year category. He won The Beatz Award in 2024, alongside the OAP of the Year at the Men of Honor Awards. That same year, he was also nominated for the Nigerian Electronic Media Content Exhibition and Awards (NEMCEA) for Best Radio Personality. In 2024, Dominate was included in Top Charts Africa’s list of the “100 Most Influential People in Africa alongside, Tshepo Mahloele and Gareth Cliff.

In January 2025, he was appointed General Manager of Lasgidi 90.1 FM, a sister station to Inspiration FM, while also serving as Deputy Head of Broadcast Services. Dominate also worked as the executive producer on DJ Neptune’s Greatness albums, handling both Greatness III (2024) and Greatness IV (2025), and he served in an A&R on ID Cabasa’s 2025 album Unfinished Business.

=== Entrepreneurship ===
In 2018, he established 10O8 World Limited, a media and talent management company. The company has worked with artists including Dotman, T-Classic, Id Cabasa, DJ Neptune and Olakira.

=== Music ===
Olowu released his first song in July 2014 a refix of Rihanna’s Diamonds and later released Dominate, produced by Puffy Tee. The song gained radio rotation in Nigeria. He later collaborated with Oritsefemi on Dominate 2.0, and with ID Cabasa on the single Olofofo.

== Views ==
Olowu has spoken publicly about the growth of Afrobeats in Nigeria and its impact on employment and the creative economy, calling for stronger government support for the sector.

== Discography ==
- Diamonds (Reffix) (2014)
- Dominate (2014)
- Dominate 2.0 ft. Oritsefemi (2015)
- Olofofo (2015)

== Awards and nominations ==
Award	Year	Category	Result
MAYA Awards	2017	On-Air Personality of the Year	Won
Eminence Awards	2018	On-Air Personality of the Year	Won
Cool Wealth Awards	2018	On-Air Personality of the Year	Won
Cool Wealth Awards	2020	On-Air Personality of the Year	Won
The Beatz Awards	2021	On-Air Personality of the Year	Nominated
The Beatz Awards	2024	On-Air Personality of the Year	Won
NEMCEA	2024	Best Radio Personaliy	Nominated
