= The Beatz Awards 2021 =

Annual Nigerian music awards ceremony

- Date: 28 November 2021
- Location: Shell Hall, Muson Center, Onikan, Victoria Island
- Hosted by: Victory Wilson; Boda Wasiu; Saco

Television/radio coverage
- Network: STV; Nigezie TV; wapTV; TVC; BEN Television; MTV Base; 98.9 Kiss FM Lagos; Rhythm 93.7 FM Lagos
- Produced by: Eliworld Int'l Limited

The 6th The Beatz Awards was held at Muson Center in Lagos on 28 November 2021. The organizers opened a portal for the public to submit entries on 4 August 2021, and recorded 2500 entries, on 6 October. Nominees were revealed on 29 October 2021. Hosted by Victory Wilson, Boda Wasiu (SLK), and Saco. It celebrated entertainment personalities across 25 voting categories, with 3 honorary Awards (non-voting).

The CEO of The Beatz Awards, Elijah John, stated: "one of the sponsors, Pazino Homes and Gardens, will be awarding a landed property to the winner of the OAP category, as the Awards have taken on new dimensions".

On 30 December 2020, the organizer held a virtual pre-ceremony of the 6th edition, tagged: "THE BEATZ AWARDS 20 FOR 20", reviewing the 20 biggest songs in the year 2020. The category New Discovery Producer was renamed Don Jazzy New Discovery Producer. The category was won by Andre Vibez, with a million naira cash price awarded to him, and the runner-up, Ajimovoix Drums.

== Nominations and winners ==
The following is a list of nominees and the winners are listed highlighted in boldface.

Producer of the Year	Don Jazzy New Discovery Producer of the Year
**Rexxie** - (Rexxie - "KPK (Ko Por Ke)"); Telz - (Patoranking - "Abule"); Duktor Sett - (Basketmouth - "Myself"); Blaise Beatz - (Adekunle Gold - "Sinner"); London - (Rema - "Soundgasm"); Spax - (Tems - "Damages"); Andre Vibez - (Ladipoe - "Feeling"); Niphkeys - (MohBad - "Feel Good")	**Andre Vibez** - (Ladipoe - "Feelings"); Ajimovoix Drums - (Ajimovoix Drums - "Focus Dance"); Mex Flairz - (Joeboy - "Show Me"); Semzi Beatz - "Laycon - "Fall For Me"); Eskeez - (Olamide - "Rock"); Mr Klebb - (Vector - "Early Momo"); Niphkeys - (Naira Marley - "Koleyewon"); London - (Ayra Starr - "Bloody Samaritan")
Afro Pop Producer of the Year	Afrobeat Producer of the Year
**Kullboy** - (AV - "Big Thug Boys"); Rexxie - (Rexxie - "KPK (Ko Por Ke)"); London - (Ayra Starr - "Bloody Samaritan"); Andre Vibez - (Crayon, & Rema - "Too Correct"); Duktor Sett - (Basketmouth -"Myself"); Niphkeys - (Naira Marley - "Koleyewon"; Kukbeatz - (Ruger - "Bounce"); Dope Sticks - (Bella Shmurda - "Cash App")	**DJ Coublon** - (Kizz Daniel - "Flex"); P2J - (Wizkid - "Reckless"); Rexxie - (Tiwa Savage - "Ole"); T.U.C – (D'Banj - "Banga"); SB - (Bella Shmurda - "World"); Cracker Mallo - (Tiwa Savage - "Dangerous Love"); P.Priime - (Wizkid - "Anoti")
Afro R&B Producer of the Year	Afro Hip Hop Producer of the Year
**Duktor Sett** - (Basketmouth - "Ride Or Die"); Louddaa - (Ayra Starr - "Away"); DeeYasso & Biedermann - (Chike - "Running (To You)"); Spax - (Tems - "Damages"); Napji & Magic Boi - (Davido - "Jowo"); Mr Kleb – (Vector - "Early Momo"); Mystro - (Tiwa Savage - "Somebody's Son"); Legendury Beatz & P2J - (Wizkid - "Essence")	**Yung Willis** - (DJ Kaywise - "Highway"); Andre Vibez - (Ladipoe - "Feeling"); Eskeez - (Reminisce - "Omo X 100"); Finito - (Laycon - "Wagwan"); Pheelz - (Vector - "Crown of Clay"); DwillsHarmony - (Laycon - "God Body"); Semzi Beatz – (Ajebo Hustlers - "Pronto"); Spax - (Show Dem Camp - "Tycoon")
Afro Highlife Producer of the Year	Afro Soul Producer of the Year
**Xtofa** - (Flavour - "Beer Parlor Discussions"); Masterkraft - (Flavour - "Doings"); Duktor Sett - (Basketmouth - "December"); Blaise Beatz - (Tekno - "Enjoy"); Rexxie - (Rexxie - "All"); Telz - (Patoranking - "Mon Bébé"); Krizbeatz - (Yemi Alade - "Yoyoyo")	**Dee Yasso** - (Ric Hassani - "Rising Sun"); Pheelz - (Fireboy DML - "Dreamer"); Johnny Drille - (Johnny Drille - "Bad Dancer"); DJ Rombee - (Niniola - "Promise"); Type A & Sizzle Pro - (Aramide - "Down for You")
Afro Dancehall Producer of the Year	Afro Gospel Producer of the Year
**Telz** - (Patoranking - "Abule"); Pheelz - (Adekunle Gold - "Pretty Girl"); Type A - (Blaqbonez - "Bling"); London - (Rema - "Soundgasm"); Tempoe - (Omah Lay - "Godly"); Chopstix - (Burna Boy - "Kilometer"); Ajimovoix Drums - (Ajimovoix Drums - "FOCUS DANCE BEAT"); Niphkeys - (Mohbad - "Feel Good")	**SMJ** - (Tim Godfrey - "Iyanu A Shele"); Nathaniel Bassey & Juzzy Pro - (Nathaniel Bassey - "Olorun Agbayi"); Password - (Ada Ehi - "Congratulations"); J. Moses - (Testimony Jaga - "My Style"); Israel Dammy - (Mercy Chinwo - "Amazing God"); Eezee Tee - (Chidinma - "Ko s’oba bire")
Songwriter of the Year	Best Mixing & Mastering Engineer of the Year
**Laycon** - "God Body"; Tems - "Damages"; Adekunle Gold – "Sinner"; Johnny Drille – "Bad Dancer"; Fireboy DML – "Dreamer"; Ruger – "Bounce"; Tiwa Savage & Brandy - "Somebody's Son"	**Timi Jay** - (MohBad) - "Feel Good"; Benie Macaulay - (Spinall - "Sere"); Swaps - (Ruger - "Bounce"); STG - (Burna Boy - "Kilometre"); Oxygen Mix - (Joeboy - "Show Me"); Xtraordinaire - (DJ Kaywise - "Highway")
Best Music Video Director of the Year	Best Choreographer of the Year
**Director Dindu** - (AV - "Big Thug Boys"); Dammy Twitch - (Teni - "For You"); The Alien Visuals - (Kizz Daniel - "Flex"); Capital Dream Pictures - (Olamide - "Rock"); Pinkline Film - (Chike - "Running"); Olu The Wave - (M.I Abaga, Vector - "Crown of Clay"); TG Omori - (Blaqbones - "Bling"); Loups Garou Films - (Johnny Drille – "Mystery Girl")	**Don Flexx**; Lovette Otegbola; Chakrapink; Girls Got Bold; Jesse Banksz
Male DJ of the Year	Female DJ of the Year
**Spinall**; DJ Kaywise; DJ Neptune; DJ Big N; Dj Consequence	**DJ Lambo**; DJ Nana; DJ Cuppy; DJ Barbie; DJ TGarbs; Soul Yin
Best Entertainment Station (Cable) of the Year	Best Entertainment Station (Terrestrial) of the Year
**MTV Base Africa**; HipTV; Soundcity TV; Trace Naija; wapTV; Nigezie TV	**Silverbird Television**; Television Continental; ONTV; Galaxy Television; Africa Independent Television; Nigerian Television Authority
Best Radio Station of the Year	Best OAP of the Year
**SoundCity 98.5FM**; The Beat 99.9 FM; Rhythm FM; Wazobia 95.1 FM; Max 102.3 FM; Cool 96.9 FM; Inspiration 92.3 FM	**Quincy Jonze** – Rhythm 93.7 FM; Moet Abebe - Soundcity 98.5 FM; Do2tun – Cool 96.9 FM; Yaw – Wazobia 95.1 FM; Toolz – The Beat 99.9 FM; Kolade Dominate Olowu – Inspiration 92.3 FM; Tha Real Skillz – Max 102.3 FM
Best Artist Manager of the Year	Best Record Label of the Year
**Sean Okeke** – Rema; Asa Asika – Davido; Seyi Awoga – Naira Marley; Bose Ogulu - Burna Boy; Muyiwa Awoniyi - Tems; Alexander Okeke – Olamide	**Mavin Records**; Davido Music Worldwide; Starboy Entertainment; Spaceship Records; YBNL Nation; Marlians Records
Best Blog of the Year	Best Online Music Platform of the Year
**BellaNaija**; Linda Ikeji’s Blog; Olorisupergal; YNaija; Instablog; Yabaleftonline; Legit.ng	**9jaflaver**; tooXclusive; Naijaloaded; NotJustOk; Akpraise
Best Music Streaming Platform of the Year
**Spotify Nigeria**; Apple Music; Deezer; UduX; Boomplay; Audiomack

== Special recognition awards ==
At the ceremony, the organizers gave a Special Recognition Award to Seyi Tinubu, Kaffy, and Harrysong.
