= Idonije =

Idonije is a Nigerian surname. Notable people with the surname include:

- Benson Idonije (born 1936), Nigerian broadcaster and music critic
- Israel Idonije (born 1980), Nigerian-Canadian NFL player and actor
