= Ziro Kingin =

- Born: Sodiq Badmus Ishola; Surulere, Lagos, Nigeria
- Genres: Afrobeats; pop
- Occupations: Singer; songwriter
- Years active: 2019–present

Ziro Kingin (born Sodiq Badmus Ishola; late 1990s) is a Nigerian indigenous rapper and songwriter. He is known for blending Yoruba and English in his music.

== Early life ==
Ziro Kingin was born in the late 1990s and raised in Surulere in Lagos State, Nigeria. He began his music journey at the age of 14. He holds a BSc in criminology from the National Open University of Nigeria.

== Career ==
Ziro Kingin released his debut mixtape Hustle in 2014 as a teenager. In 2019, his single "From The Lungu" (featuring Dablixx Oshaa) gained attention, followed by "So Far So Good" (2020) which featured Seyi Vibez. "So Far So Good" was later removed from streaming platforms due to an industry dispute.

In 2022, Ziro Kingin took a hiatus from music to focus on family and personal growth. He returned in 2025. In June 2026, did a musical tour in the UK. Ziro Kingin performed two 30-minute sets at Oxlade Live in Birmingham, UK, at CAVE Birmingham. His performance was praised for Yoruba musical identity during his rendition of "Aye".

In June 2026, he released the single "Win Or Win (WOW)", described by critics as a gospel of hope and resilience, with lyrics reflecting his determination and street-bred philosophy.

== Musical style ==
Ziro Kingin is known for blending Yoruba and English in his lyrics. His music often addresses themes of struggle, resilience, hope and survival.

== Discography ==
=== Mixtapes ===
- Hustle (2014)
- So Far So Good (2020)

=== Singles ===
- "From The Lungu" featuring Dablixx Oshaa (2019)
- "Win Or Win (WOW)" (2026)
- "Aye" (2026)

== Awards and nominations ==
Year	Award	Category	Result	Ref.
2025	Nigerian Iconoclast Award	Originality Vanguard	Won	
