= Nissi (musician) =

Nigerian musical artist

Nissi Ogulu
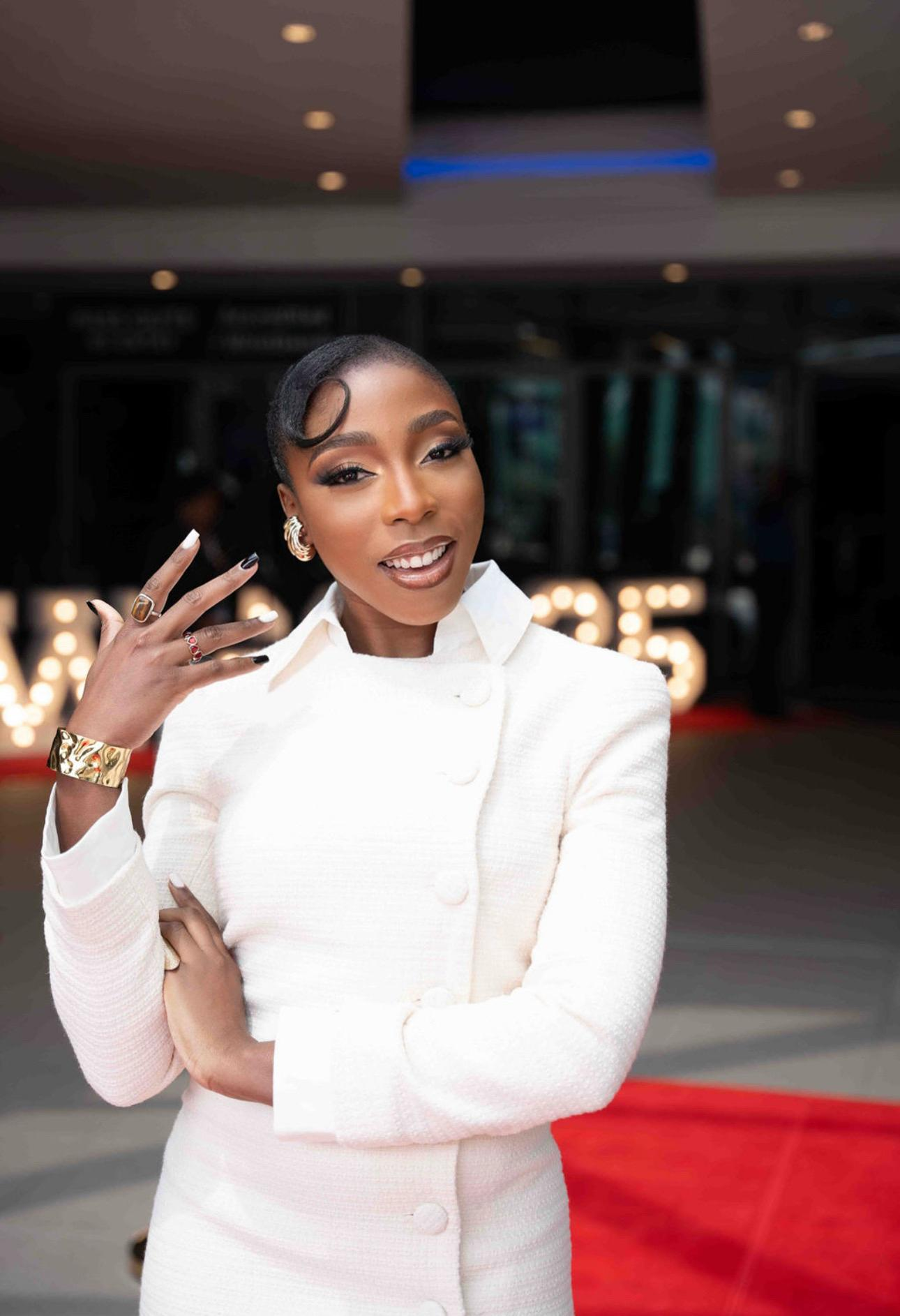
- Nissi in 2025

Background information
- Born: Jehovah-Nissi Ogulu; Port Harcourt, Rivers State, Nigeria
- Origin: Nigerian
- Genres: Afrobeats; Afro-pop; highlife
- Occupations: Singer; songwriter; entrepreneur; engineer
- Years active: 2016
- Label: Spaceship Records

Jehovah-Nissi Ogulu, known professionally as Nissi, is a Nigerian singer, songwriter, engineer, and creative director based in the United Kingdom. She founded Creele Animation Studios and co-founded Kemet Automotive.

== Early life ==
Nissi Ogulu was born in Nigeria, where she developed an early interest in music at the age of six. She later relocated to the United Kingdom, where she studied Mechanical Engineering at the University of Warwick. Her mother is Bose Ogulu, served as co-executive producer of the Grammy Award-winning album Twice as Tall. Nissi's grandfather is Benson Idonije, a radio broadcaster and first band manager of the late Fela Aníkúlápó Kuti and she is the younger sister to Afrobeats artiste Burna Boy.

== Career ==
=== Music ===
Nissi's debut single “Pay Attention” was released in September 2016. She later released the official visuals directed by 2012 Stanley Kubrick Award winner; Labi Odebunmi. Her third single titled ‘’Familiar’’ was produced by Nigerian music producer Chopstix and was also released in 2016. In 2020, she released her EP titled IGNITE and followed up with singles, Hold in 2021, Gravity (2022)

In February 2023, the official music video for "Overthinking" premiered, amassing over a million views on YouTube. After its release, the video was included in the lineup for AfroNation Portugal, where Nissi performed her single "Higher" on June 29, 2023. The event took place at Portimao Beach from June 28 to 30.

On June 15, 2023, Nissi unveiled her single "Higher". The track, produced by Kiyagigram and co-produced by Killertunes, was met with anticipation from fans. Subsequently, its accompanying music video was released on August 28, 2023.

In September 2023, she released her single “Nobody” featuring Fireboy DML. She released a seven-track EP “Unboxed” on 6 October 2023, which contained her single "Overthinking" (2022).

=== Engineering and Innovation ===
In 2021, she was one of the Jaguar Land Rover engineering team members that designed and put together the 2023 Range Rover Model and launched a charity NFT collection on the Binance NFT marketplace. She also released a 3D Animation short film titled "The Satchel" where she worked in the roles of director, producer, and composer, created by her company. She also designed the 2022 Havana Club X Burna, which was awarded most innovative product at Paris Packaging week 2023.

=== Performances ===
In January 2023, AfroNation announced Nissi as one of the featured artistes to perform at the inaugural Afro Nation Miami Festival held at LoanDepot Park in Miami, Florida.

Nissi announced her inaugural headline performance at Sounds Of Brazil (SOBs) in New York. The event took place on March 15, 2024, marking a milestone in her career.

== Awards and Recognition ==
On March 5, 2025, at the Forbes Africa women Leading Summit in Pretoria, South Africa, Nissi Ogulu was presented with the ‘Youth Icon Award’ in recognition of her work in music, art, and electric vehicle innovation. During the event, she addressed topics related to Africa’s future, sustainability, and women’s leadership.

== Filmography ==
- The Satchel (2021)

== Discography ==
=== EPs ===
- Ignite (2020)
- Unboxed (2023)

=== Singles ===
- "Criminal" (2016)
- "Pay Attention" (2016)
- "Familiar" (2016)
- "Over Here" (2019)
- "Move X2" (2021)
- "Hold" (2021)
- "Gravity" (2022)
- "Overthinking" (2022)
- "Higher" (2023)
- "Nobody" (2023)
- "Heavy" (2023)
- "Thunder" (2023)
- "Unwind" (2023)
- "Gloves" (2023)

=== Features ===
- Ready or Not" (2021)

=== Art Shows ===
- Puzzled (2022)
