= Professor Hindu =

Professor Hindu (born Kwaku Addai) is a Ghanaian magician, born in Assin Kumasi but lived most of his life at Fante Nyankomasi, he had 32 wives with six (6) women, he has over 92 grandchildren... Professor Hindu was widely known for his wonderful magical performances, he was also a healer and close spiritual associate of the late Nigerian Afrobeat musician, Fela Kuti.

== Education and career ==
Professor Hindu was born in 1935 and attended Akyem Oda Government Primary and Middle Schools. He claims that he discovered his gift when he was seven years old. He learned tailoring after completing school. However, he gave it up for the more lucrative work as a magician.

Fela Kuti invited Professor Hindu to Lagos in 1981, and he became Fela's spiritual adviser. That year, Fela renamed his Afrika 70 band as Egypt 80. It was reported that Professor Hindu "reportedly hacked open one man's throat and fatally shot another" on his assignment at Fela's New Afrika Shrine. The two persons were allegedly revived.

== Controversy ==
In 2014, English journalist Suzanne Moore recounted hearing that Hindu had attempted to cut his own throat in a bar in London. She dismissed Hindu's performance as "amateurish" but Fela would not take lightly to that. According to music historian John Collins, Fela was arrested for money laundering because Hindu promised and failed to make the money disappear. Another Fela biographer Benson Idonije stated that Hindu's spiritual power was supposed to be for entertainment purpose but it won Fela over.
