= Billion Dollar Baby (disambiguation) =

Billion Dollar Baby is a musical.

Billion Dollar Baby may also refer to:

- Billion Dollar Baby (album), a 2022 album by Seyi Vibez
- Billion Dollar Baby (DaBaby mixtape), a 2017 mixtape by DaBaby

== See also ==
- Billion Dollar Babies
- Million Dollar Baby
