= Kaffy =

Nigerian dancer (born 1980)

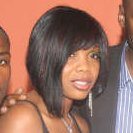
- Kaffy at Omawumi's The Lasso of Truth album launch in 2013
- Born: Kafayat Oluwatoyin Shafau; 30 June 1980 (age 46); Lagos, Nigeria
- Education: Yaba College of Technology; Olabisi Onabanjo University
- Occupations: Dancer; Choreographer; Dance critic; Fitness coach
- Years active: 2002 - present
- Organization: Imagneto Dance Company
- Children: 2

Kafayat Oluwatoyin Shafau (born 30 June 1980), popularly known by her stage name Kaffy, is a Nigerian dancer, dance critic, choreographer, dance instructor and fitness coach. She is also the founder and owner of Imagneto Dance Company. She is best known for breaking the Guinness World Record for "Longest Dance Party" at the Nokia Silverbird Danceathon in 2006. She is currently a dance instructor who has developed innovative visualisation-based methods for teaching dance and dance fitness in an accelerated-learning format.

== Early life and education ==
Kaffy was born and raised in Nigeria . She completed her primary education at Chrisland School, Opebi and her secondary school education at Coker Secondary School, Orile-Iganmu before attending Yaba College of Technology for a while and went on to obtain a diploma in data processing and computer science from Olabisi Onabanjo University.

== Career ==
Kaffy's dancing career took off after she went to an event to perform onstage by someone who spotted her when she used to go to the National Stadium during weekends for dance rehearsals and workouts.

=== Imagneto Dance Company ===
Imagneto Dance Company is a Lagos-based dance group owned and founded by Kaffy, a Nigerian dance instructor and choreographer. In 2006, Kaffy led the dance group to break the Guinness Book of Record for "Longest Dance Party" after they danced for 55hours and 40minutes at the Nokia Silverbird Danceathon. The company also won AFRIMMA's Best Dance Group 2014.

=== The Dance Workshop ===
In 2017, she created 'The Dance Workshop ' a dance convention aimed at training and mentoring professional dancers as well as promoting cultural exchange within the Nigerian dance industry. The 2017 Edition featured America's leading choreographer, AY Hollywood.

== Personal life ==
She was married to Joseph Ameh, the music director and drummer for Nigerian duo P-Square from June 2012 to January 2022. She filed for divorce on 11 January 2022. She has two children with him.

== Filmography ==
=== Dance fitness and instructions ===
- "9jaDance Burnout"
- "Ijoda9ja Dance Burnout"

=== Reality television shows ===
- Malta Guinness Street Dance - (Judge)
- Project Fame West Africa - (Faculty Member)
- Dance with Peter – (Judge and Faculty Instructor)

=== Music videos ===
Kaffy is recognized for her dance moves and level of stamina. She has featured in award-winning musical videos for artistes such as Seyi Shay, D'banj, P-Square Olamide Tiwa Savage and some other international top acts.

== Awards and nominations ==
Year	Award ceremony	Award description	Result
2013	Creative Industry Awards	Performing Arts	Nominated
2014	African Muzik Magazine Awards	Best Female Dancer of the Year	Won
2015	The Beatz Awards	Best Choreographer of the Year	Won
2018	The Headies Awards	Special Recognition Award	Won
2021	The Beatz Awards	Special Recognition Award	Won

For Imagneto Dance Company:

Year	Award ceremony	Award description	Result
2014	African Muzik Magazine Awards	Best Dance Group	Won
