= Vibe Till Thy Kingdom Come =

2023 studio album by Seyi Vibez

Studio album by Seyi Vibez
- Released: 8 June 2023
- Studio: Dvpper
- Genres: Apala; street pop; Amapiano; Sakara; afro-fusion; Fuji
- Length: 26:47
- Labels: Vibez; Dvpper
- Producers: Dapper; Seyi Vibez; Dibs; TBM; QueBeat; Jhay2unez

Seyi Vibez chronology
Memory Card (2023)	Vibe Till Thy Kingdom Come (2023)	Thy Kingdom Come (2023)

Singles from Vibe Till Thy Kingdom Come
- 1. "Hat-trick" Released: 29 May 2023; 2. "Amdallah" Released: 29 May 2023

Vibe Till Thy Kingdom Come is the second studio album by Nigerian street-pop singer Seyi Vibez. It was released on 8 June 2023 through Vibez Inc and Dvpper Music. The album includes guest appearances from Young Jonn, Jibrille, Russ, and Focalistic, and features a mixture of Afrobeats, Fuji, Apala, Sakara, street pop, and Amapiano rhythms. It was executively produced by Dvpper Music founder and CEO Dapper, and Seyi Vibez, along with production from Dibs, TBM, QueBeat, and Jhay2unez.

== Background ==
In 2023, Seyi Vibez announced his plan to release his debut project, shortly after releasing his second extended play titled Memory Card on 6 January 2023. Following the commercial success of Vibe Till Thy Kingdom Come, which debuted at number one on Nigeria's TurnTable official album chart. Vibe Till Thy Kingdom Come paved the way for his next project titled Thy Kingdom Come.

== Singles and promotion ==
On 29 May 2023, Seyi Vibez released the lead singles of his project titled "Hat-trick", and "Amdallah", with an accompanying music video for "Hat-trick" directed by TG Omori. "Hat-trick" debut at number two on TurnTable Nigeria official Top 100 songs chart.

On 27 June 2023, Seyi announced a free homecoming show to promote the album and his next album Thy Kingdom Come.

== Critical reception ==
Professional ratings
Review scores
Source	Rating
Pulse Nigeria	8.1/10
The Native	6.8/10

Adeayo Adebiyi, a music reporter for Pulse Nigeria stated that “The range and identity in 'Vibe Till Thy Kingdom Come' provide the balance required to stabilize Seyi Vibez's place in the mainstream while also helping him build a brand that excels on its merit. The quality of music it delivers, the range it offers, and the much-needed balance it achieves make this album an impressive body of work that positions Seyi Vibez for an upper trajectory in the mainstream”. Reviewing for The Native, Dennis Ade Peter stated that “‘Vibe Till Thy Kingdom Come’ is clear in its sentiment that Seyi Vibez believes his success isn’t man-made. Over the sombre piano keys of “Blacka Rhythm,” his faith is underlined by his belief that he’s got angels watching over him. “My sister, my mother, both gone/Oluwaloseyi, mo gba gbo (I believe),” he sings as the song fades into an Isicathamiya sample. It’s the most wistful moment in his catalogue yet, proof that there’s a heart beneath the veneer of his spiritually-backed convictions.”.

=== Rankings ===
Select rankings of Vibe Till Thy Kingdom Come
Publication	List	Rank	Ref.
Pan African Music	PAM 's best albums of June 2023	8	

== Track listing ==
All tracks are written by Balogun Oluwaloseyi except where noted.

Vibe Till Thy Kingdom Come track listing
No.	Title	Writer(s)	Length
1.	"Kingdom"		2:10
2.	"Hat-trick"		2:40
3.	"For the Gods"		2:57
4.	"Dejavu"		2:41
5.	"Suddenly" (featuring Young Jonn)	Oluwaloseyi; John Saviours Udomboso	2:09
6.	"Fuji Interlude"		2:05
7.	"Gangsta" (remix featuring Russ and Jibrille)	Oluwaloseyi; Russell James Vitale; Jibrille	3:04
8.	"Money Matter" (featuring Focalistic)	Oluwaloseyi; Lethabo Sebetso	3:36
9.	"Amdallah"		3:00
10.	"Blacka Rhythm"		2:25
Total length:			26:47

== Charts ==
Weekly chart performance for Vibe Till Thy Kingdom Come
Chart (2023)	Peak position
Nigeria Albums (TurnTable)	1
