= Bose Ogulu =

Nigerian academic and artist manager

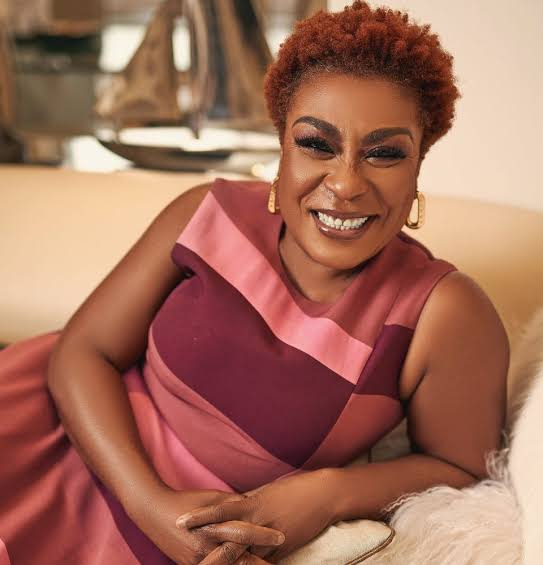
- Born: Bose Idonije; November 19, 1967 (age 58); Edo State, Nigeria
- Other name: Mama Burna
- Education: University of Port Harcourt
- Occupations: Talent manager, businesswoman, academic, translator
- Children: Burna Boy (son)
- Parent: Benson Idonije (father)

Bose Ogulu (born 19 November 1967), also known as Mama Burna, is a Nigerian academic, businesswoman and talent manager. She manages her children Burna Boy and Nissi Ogulu's musical careers.

== Early life ==
Ogulu is the daughter of Nigerian music critic Benson Idonije, who was the manager of Fela Kuti. With a Bachelor of Arts in foreign languages and a Masters of Arts in translation from University of Port Harcourt, Ogulu had a successful career as a translator for the Federation of West African Chambers of Commerce. She is fluent in English, French, German and Italian. She then ran a language school called Language Bridges, where she organized cultural immersion trips for over 1800 young people.

In addition, she taught French for a decade at the University of Education in Port Harcourt, retiring in 2018.

== Career ==
Bose manages the musical careers of her son Damini, who performs as Burna Boy, and of her daughter Nissi Ogulu. She managed Burna Boy until 2014 and then again from 2017 onwards, gaining the nickname Mama Burna. She has collected awards for Burna Boy at various events, including the All Africa Music Awards, The Headies and the MTV Europe Music Award. When Bose heard that Burna Boy had won the 2019 MTV award for Best African Act, she interrupted his show to tell him.

When Burna Boy won four prizes at the 2018 Soundcity MVP Awards Festival, Bose represented him and caused a social media sensation by saying "Expect more madness". At the 2019 BET Awards in California, Bose stood in for her son to collect the award for Best International Act and gave a speech reminding African-Americans to remember "you were Africans before you became anything else" which resulted in a standing ovation.

Bose Ogulu is the founder & CEO of Spaceship Collective, the holding company to entertainment label Spaceship Records and publishing outfit Spaceship Publishing.

Today, She is the founder and CEO of Spaceship Collective, the umbrella company behind Burna Boy’s label Spaceship Records. Ogulu has won “Manager of the Year” and recognized at several African music industry events. Her achievements have earned her multiple industry awards.

== Awards and nominations ==
Year	Award	Category	Result	Ref
2022	Net Honours	Most Searched Person	Nominated	
2022	The Beatz Awards	Best Artist Manager of the Year	Nominated	
2022	The Headies	Special Recognition	Won	
2022	Artists & Manager Awards	Manager of the year	Won	
2023	Best of Africa Awards	History Maker Award	Won	
