= Thy Kingdom Come (Seyi Vibez album) =

2023 studio album by Seyi Vibez

Studio album by Seyi Vibez
- Released: 24 June 2023
- Recorded: Lagos
- Studio: Dvpper Studios
- Genre: Apala; Street pop; Amapiano; Sakara; Afro-fusion; Fuji
- Label: Vibez Inc; Dvpper Music
- Producer: Dapper (EP); Seyi Vibez (EP); Dibs

Seyi Vibez chronology
Vibe Till Thy Kingdom Come (2023)	Thy Kingdom Come (2023)

Thy Kingdom Come is the fourth studio album by Nigerian street-pop singer Seyi Vibez. It was released on 24 June 2023, through Vibez Inc, and Dvpper Music. The album included guest appearances from Nigerian indigenous rapper Phyno, and South African singer Ami Faku. It was executively produced by Dvpper Music founder and CEO Dapper, and Seyi Vibez, along with production from Dibs. The album is a mixture of Afropop, Amapiano, Nigerian Hip Hop, Afroswing, R&B/Soul, Arabic hip hop, and Fuji fusion.

== Background ==
In 2023, Seyi Vibez announced the release of his debut project, two weeks after releasing Vibe Till Thy Kingdom Come. The project debuted at number three, and reached number two on Nigeria's TurnTable official album chart.

== Promotion ==
On 27 June 2023, Seyi announced a free homecoming show to promote the album and his previous album Vibe Till Thy Kingdom Come.

== Critical reception ==
Professional ratings
Review scores
Source	Rating
Pulse Nigeria	8.2/10

Adeayo Adebiyi, a music reporter for Pulse Nigeria stated that “With ‘Thy Kingdom Come’, Seyi Vibez thumps his chest while maintaining a resolution to make music that retains the core elements of his identity. The result is an album that achieves a musical depth that surpasses his previous efforts”. Reviewing for MoreBranches, Patrick Ezema stated that “His lyrics betray, brave as he may try to be, the pain of his loss, but his emptiness is better felt in the things left unsaid; spaces in the album where there should be chaotic log drums, he fills with more morose horns. A similar cloud overshadowed Vibe Till Thy Kingdom Come, but on Thy Kingdom Come the first signs of healing appear over his wounds, as he contends with the finality of loss”.

=== Rankings ===
Select rankings of Thy Kingdom Come
Publication	List	Rank	Ref.
Pulse Nigeria	Pulse Nigeria 's Top 10 Afrobeats albums (EP & LP) for the first half of 2022	5	

== Track listing ==
Vibe Till Thy Kingdom Come
No.	Title	Writer(s)	Length
1.	"Man of The Year"	Oluwaloseyi	2:24
2.	"Professor"	Oluwaloseyi	2:09
3.	"Hushpuppi"	Oluwaloseyi	2:42
4.	"Karma"	Oluwaloseyi	2:34
5.	"Migos"	Oluwaloseyi	2:21
6.	"Highlife interlude" (feat. Phyno)	Oluwaloseyi; Chibuzo Nelson Azubuike	2:20
7.	"Trumpet"	Oluwaloseyi	2:45
8.	"Flakky" (feat. Ami Faku)	Oluwaloseyi; Amanda Faku	2:18
9.	"LOML"	Oluwaloseyi	2:36
10.	"All The Time"	Oluwaloseyi	2:23

== Charts ==
Weekly chart performance for Thy Kingdom Come
Chart (2023)	Peak position
Nigerian Albums (TurnTable)	2
