= Lyta =

Nigerian singer

- Born: Opeyemi Babatunde Rahim; Ajegunle, Lagos, Nigeria
- Genres: Afrobeats; pop
- Occupations: Singer; songwriter
- Years active: 2018–present
- Label: Rafat Music

Babatunde Rahim, known professionally as Lyta, is a Nigerian singer and songwriter . He signed a record deal with YBNL Nation in 2018 but left the label in May 2019 after having a disagreement with the label owner Olamide. He released the 5-track debut EP Id in 2019.

== Early life and career ==
A native of Kwara State, Lyta grew up in Ajegunle and was a member of Ile Kewu, a music group at his local mosque. His record deal with YBNL Nation was made public on 3 February 2018. In 2019, Lyta confirmed that he did not have any written contracts with YBNL Nation. Lyta's breakthrough single with YBNL Nation, "Time", features vocals by Olamide and was released on 14 February 2018.

In 2019, Lyta left YBNL Nation due to contractual and personal issues. After exiting YBNL, he signed with Doro Musik Gang and released the Killertunes produced track "Monalisa" on 12 July 2019. The visuals for "Monalisa", which was directed by Director K, amassed over 500,000 views within a month after its release.

A few weeks after the release of "Monalisa", Davido reached out to Lyta about recording an official remix with him. Following their agreement, Davido and Lyta flew to Dakar for the remix and video shoot. The remix of "Monalisa" was released on 30 August 2019. Elias Light of Rolling Stone magazine described the song as a "handsome contradiction, with fierce expressions of yearning". The accompanying music video for the remix was directed by Director K. Lyta gained exposure following his collaboration with Davido on the remix.

Lyta released the Afrobeat track "Worry" on 6 December 2019; it was produced by Killer Tunes. The visuals for "Worry" was shot and directed by Simplicity Visual Studios in London.

=== YBNL exit ===
Reports about Lyta's exit from YBNL surfaced after Olamide unfollowed him on Instagram. In May 2019, Lyta confirmed his exit from YNBL Nation on Naijaloaded TV. He said although he was paid between 50,000 and 80,000 for shows, he never had a written contract with the label. Olamide issued a statement to Guardian Life, saying YBNL has a promotion calendar that Lyta refused to follow.

=== New record label ===
In 2020, Lyta was signed to Marlian Records owned by Naira Marley. He also released his first single under the label titled "Hold me Down(Omo Gidi)". The video to "Hold Me Down", which was inspired by Kpop boy bands GOT7 and BTS, was directed by TG Omori. The video is an exact replica of GOT7's "Just Right" music video. However, Lyta did not ask for permission and K-pop fans were furious about the exact copy of the video. Lyta said, "I am not signed with Marlian records. Naira Marley is just showing me love."

== Discography ==
=== Studio albums ===
Title	Details
**Rafat**	Released: 11 March 2022; Label: Rafat Music / Dvpper Music; Format: Digital download, streaming
**LEAK**	Released: 6 December 2024; Label: Lyta / Azuri; Format: Digital download, streaming
**Al-Awwal**	Released: 10 April 2025; Label: Fast Forward '26; Format: Digital download, streaming

=== EPs ===
- Id (2019)
- **Stranger** (2023)

=== Singles ===
As lead artist

Year	Title	Album	Ref
2018	"Time" (featuring Olamide)	Non-album single	
2018	"Self Made"	Non-album single	
2018	"Do You"	Non-album single	
2019	"Pure Water"	Non-album single	
2019	"Monalisa"	Non-album single	
2019	"Monalisa Remix" (featuring Davido)	Non-album single	
2019	"Worry"	Non-album single	
2020	"Mama"	Non-album single	
2020	"Hold Me Down (Omo Gidi)"	Non-album single	
2020	"Everybody"	Non-album single	
2020	"Ramadan"	Non-album single	
2021	"Are You Sure" (feat. Naira Marley & Zinoleesky)		
2021	"Different Conversation Live 4" (with Seyi Vibez)	Rafat	
2022	"Real Me"	Rafat	
2022	"Destiny (Kadara)"	Non-album single	
2023	"Wole Wa"	Non-album single	
2024	"Sabi Boy"	Non-album single	
2024	"Drunk Love"	LEAK	
2025	"Shine & Bright"	Non-album single	
2025	"Scars n' Lesson"	Non-album single	
2026	"Habibi"	Non-album single	
2026	"Finally"	Non-album single	

As featured artist

Year	Title	Album
2019	"That Same Boy" (Limerick featuring Lyta)	Non-album single
2019	"Aje Remix" (Jaywon featuring Barry Jhay and Lyta)	Non-album single
2019	"Okay" (TooClasiq featuring Lyta)	Non-album single
2019	"Loke Loke" (Lol featuring Lyta)	Non-album single
2019	"Be Happy" (Package AOC featuring Oritse Femi, Zamorra and Lyta)	Non-album single
2019	"Ori" (Dexter Miles featuring Lyta)	Non-album single
2022	"Omo Ogbon" (T.I Blaze featuring Lyta)	Non-album single
2025	"TOSPI" (AJEMO featuring Lyta)	Non-album single
2025	"Blessings" (lambaboi kizzie featuring Lyta)	Non-album single
2026	"Bread Winner" (Lagos Ibadan featuring Lyta)	Non-album single

== Awards and nominations ==
Year	Award ceremony	Prize	Recipient	Result	Ref
2019	The Headies	Next Rated	Himself	Nominated	
2019	The Headies	Best Street-Hop Artiste	Himself	Nominated	
2019	City People Music Awards	Most Promising Act of the Year	Himself	Nominated	
2019	City People Music Awards	Best New Act of the Year	Himself	Nominated	
