= Peace (MohBad song) =

Single by MohBad
- Released: 2 September 2022
- Genre: Street-pop
- Length: 3:26
- Label: Marlian Music
- Songwriter: Ilerioluwa Oladimeji Aloba
- Producer: Rexxie

MohBad singles chronology
"Ronaldo" (2022)	"Peace" (2022)	"Tiff" (2022)

"Peace" is a song by Nigerian street-pop musician MohBad, released on 2 September 2022 through Marlian Music, and produced by Rexxie. On 3 September 2022, the music video was released and directed by Ibidunni Oladayo. "Peace" debuted at number 25 on Nigeria's Top Street-POP Songs. "Peace" peaked at number 5 on the Official Nigeria Top 100, and number 8 on Nigeria radio.

== Lyrical content ==
In the song, MohBad speaks about trying to find his peace, after being through many things and dealing with frenemies without resting.

== Versions ==
- 2022: "Peace"
- 2023: "Peace" – Covered by Chrissy Spratt

== Commercial performance ==
Following the passing of the singer, the song gained 837,000 on-demand streams within September 12 – 14 2023, as reported by TurnTable. In the report, "Peace" gained about 1378% in the two and half days. He became the 46th best-selling digital artiste in the world. On 15 September 2023, the song debuted at number 1 on Apple Music in Nigeria. On the week of 23 September 2023, "Peace" debut on Billboard Hot Trending Songs Powered by X chart at number 2. On 23 September 2023, TheCable's TCL Radio ranked "Peace" at number two, on its weekly top 10 most played songs on airplay in Nigeria. TheCable's also said; MohBad dethroned Burna Boy's "City Boys" from the number 1 spot. In 2023, MohBad set a new Spotify record with "Peace" after the demise. On 26 September 2023, "Peace" peaked at number 23 on Billboard U.S. Afrobeats Songs.

== Accolades ==
Awards and nominations for "Peace"
Year	Organization	Award	Result	Ref
2023	The Headies	Best Street-Hop Artiste	Nominated	

== Charts ==
Chart performance for "Peace"
Chart (2022–2023)	Peak position
NG Official Top 100 (TurnTable)	5
NG Official Streaming Songs (TurnTable)	4
NG Top Street-POP Songs (TurnTable)	25
NG TheCable Lifestyle Radio (TheCable)	2
NG Radio (TurnTable)	8
US Afrobeats Songs (Billboard)	23
US Hot Trending Songs Powered by X (Billboard)	2

== Certifications ==
Certifications for "Peace"
Region	Certification	Certified units/sales
Nigeria (TCSN)	Platinum	100,000^{‡}
^{‡} Sales+streaming figures based on certification alone.
