= Billion Dollar Baby (album) =

2022 studio album by Seyi Vibez

Studio album by Seyi Vibez
- Released: 2 November 2022
- Recorded: Lagos
- Studio: Dvpper Studios
- Genres: Street pop; Afrobeats
- Labels: Vibez Inc; Dvpper Music
- Producers: Dapper (EP); Seyi Vibez (EP); TBM; Enta; QUE; FreshVDM; Rexxie

Seyi Vibez chronology
NSNV (2022)	Billion Dollar Baby (2022)	Memory Card (2023)

Deluxe edition

Billion Dollar Baby is the debut studio album by Nigerian street-pop singer Seyi Vibez. It was released on 2 November 2022, through Vibez Inc, and Dvpper Music. The album included guest appearances from Simi, and Mayorkun. The album is a mixture of Fuji, Tungba, and Apala rhythms. It was executively produced by Dvpper Music founder and CEO Dapper, and Seyi Vibez, along with production from TBM, Enta, QUE, FreshVDM, and Rexxie. The deluxe version of the album was released on 9 December 2022.

== Background ==
On 5 May 2023, The Africa Reporters cited Seyi Vibez as one of the pioneers of "Afro-Adura", a subgenre of Afrobeats with Street-pop influence fused with Yoruba prayers, with Billion Dollar Baby establishing this fact.

== Critical reception ==
Professional ratings
Review scores
Source	Rating
Pulse Nigeria	8.2/10

Adeayo Adebiyi, a music reporter for Pulse Nigeria stated that “Overall, 'Billion Dollar Baby' retains sufficient identity that carries along existing listeners while providing the gratification needed to bring new listeners into the fold. One thing is for sure, there's more talent from where this project comes from and the Billion Dollar Baby can only get better”.

=== Rankings ===
Select rankings of Billion Dollar Baby
Publication	List	Rank	Ref.
Pulse Nigeria	Pulse Nigeria 's Top 10 Albums of 2022	10	

Select rankings of Billion Dollar Baby 2.0
Publication	List	Rank	Ref.
TurnTable	TurnTable's The 2023 Nigerian Mid-Year Charts	2	

== Commercial performance ==
On 13 November 2022, TurnTable reported “Billion Dollar Baby previously debuted with 3,150 album units last week (off of two days of tracking)”. Further said, “The album has now had its first complete week of tracking during the week of November 4 – 10, 2022”. In addition to that, “the album’s focus single "Chance (Na Ham)" is aiming for a top ten spot on this week’s top 10. It would be the artiste’s second top-ten entry in Nigeria – joining "Billion Dollar" which peaked at No. 10 earlier in 2022”. On 7 November 2022, Billon Dollar Baby peak at number 2 on Nigeria Official Top 50 Albums. On 12 December 2022, Billion Dollar Baby 2.0 peaked at number 1 on Nigeria Official Top 50 Albums. On 25 July 2023, Billion Dollar Baby 2.0 was recorded as the 2nd most streamed album in Nigeria by TurnTable, in the first half of 2023 with 131.1 million streams.

== Track listing ==
Billion Dollar Baby - Standard edition
No.	Title	Writer(s)	Length
1.	"BD Baby"	Oluwaloseyi	2:13
2.	"Darling" (feat. Simi)	Oluwaloseyi; Simisola Bolatito Kosoko	2:56
3.	"Ife"	Oluwaloseyi	2:19
4.	"Saro"	Oluwaloseyi	2:44
5.	"Billion Dollar"	Oluwaloseyi	2:25
6.	"Bullion Van"	Oluwaloseyi	2:36
7.	"Gangsta"	Oluwaloseyi	2:47
8.	"+234"	Oluwaloseyi	2:13
9.	"Ten" (feat. Mayorkun)	Oluwaloseyi; Adewale Mayowa Emmanuel	2:45
10.	"Bank Of America"	Oluwaloseyi	2:41
Total length:			25:39

Billion Dollar Baby 2.0 - Deluxe edition
No.	Title	Writer(s)	Length
11.	"Chance (Na Ham)"	Oluwaloseyi	2:57
12.	"Psalm 23"	Oluwaloseyi	3:01
13.	"Kun Faya Kun (Be and it is)"	Oluwaloseyi	3:02
14.	"Ogochukwu"	Oluwaloseyi	2:26
15.	"Go Low"	Oluwaloseyi	2:26
16.	"IQ"	Oluwaloseyi	3:16
Total length:			43:07

== Charts ==
=== Weekly charts ===
Weekly chart performance for Billion Dollar Baby
Chart (2023)	Peak position
Nigeria Albums (TurnTable)	2

Weekly chart performance for Billion Dollar Baby 2.0
Chart (2023)	Peak position
Nigeria Albums (TurnTable)	1
