= MohBad =

Nigerian singer-songwriter (1996–2023)

- Born: Ilerioluwa Oladimeji Aloba; 3 January 1996; Ikorodu, Nigeria
- Died: 12 September 2023 (aged 27); Nigeria
- Other name: Imole
- Citizenship: Nigerian
- Occupations: Singer; rapper; songwriter
- Years active: 2019–2023
- Works: Discography
- Musical career
- Genres: Afrobeats; Streetpop; Amapiano; Afropop; Hip Hop
- Instruments: Vocals
- Labels: Marlians Music (former); Imolenization

YouTube information
- Channel: Mohbad
- Subscribers: 247K
- Views: 64,618,748
- Last updated: 11 March 2026

Ilerioluwa Oladimeji Aloba (3 January 1996 – 12 September 2023), known professionally as MohBad, was a Nigerian rapper, singer, and songwriter. Mohbad was formerly signed to Naira Marley's Marlian Records and left the label in 2022. He was best known for his hit songs "Ponmo," "Peace," "Beast and Peace," "Sorry", "Feel Good," and "KPK (Ko Por Ke)" with Rexxie, which was nominated three times for The Headies awards in 2022. On 18 September 2023, he ranked number 1 on TurnTable's Official Artiste Top 100.

== Early life ==
Ilerioluwa Oladimeji Aloba was born on 3 January 1996 in Ikorodu, Nigeria. During his early childhood and adolescent years, MohBad seemed to be "hugely talented and in tune with the very spirit of music".

== Music career ==
=== 2019–2022: Light, "Peace" ===
MohBad issued his first EP, Light, after agreeing to a record deal with Marlian Records World in 2019. The eight songs on the EP feature Davido, Naira Marley, and Lil Kesh. Naira Marley served as executive producer for the eight-track EP, which also bears the production stamps of SB, Rexxie, P.Beat, and Austin Sinister.

MohBad was nominated five times for The Beatz Awards 2021. Audiomack ranked him twelfth in their list of the top 21 Afrobeats artists of 2021. In 2022, he released "Peace", produced by Rexxie. It peaked on the TurnTable top 50 in 2021 and top 100 in 2022. After the announcement of his death, "Peace" became a major hit, reaching number one on Apple Music in Nigeria and was accompanied by his single "Ask About Me," at number two. As of 15 September 2023, "Beast & Peace," the opening track on Blessed was at number four and "Feel Good" at number five. Between 12 and 14 September, his streams increased by 702%, from 990,000 to 8.02 million. For the week of 23 September 2023, "Peace" debuted on Billboard's Hot Trending Songs chart at number two.

=== 2023–present: Blessed, death and international success ===
Mohbad's EP Blessed, his first after leaving Marlian Records World, was released in June 2023 under his own label, Imolenization. The eight songs on the 20-minute EP featured Nigerian artists Zlatan and Bella Shmurda, and producers Niphkeys and Timi Jay. The album charted at number one on Apple Music in Nigeria the week it was released, and subsequently, immediately after his death. On 18 September 2023, Blessed reached a new peak at number four, and Light made its first chart entry at number 20 on the Nigerian Official Top 50 Albums chart. On 21 September, streams of Blessed increased by over 530%. On 23 September, he became the 46th best-selling digital artist, surpassing international artists such as Nicki Minaj, Eminem, 21 Savage, Lady Gaga, and Chris Brown. He was later described as "one of the greatest rappers".

== Controversy ==
=== NDLEA arrest ===
In February 2022, the National Drug Law Enforcement Agency (NDLEA) arrested MohBad, Zinoleesky, and four others at their home in Lekki, Lagos for possession of illegal substances that included MDMA and cannabis.

Some viral videos on social media showed NDLEA operatives breaking into the musicians' home in the Lekki district of Lagos State in the early hours of Thursday morning. According to witnesses, the officials carried out the arrest without any search warrants and mistreated the Marlian singers. The NDLEA officers were seen hitting the musicians with clubs and shooting into the air, forcing them into waiting trucks.

NDLEA confirmed the raid, stating "our men raided an area in Idado estate where Naira Marley's boys stay." According to a spokesperson for the NDLEA, cannabis and MDMA were found in their apartment and car. MohBad, Zinoleesky, and four others were later released.

=== Allegations against Naira Marley and Sam Larry ===
After two years, he announced his departure from Marlian Records. On 5 October 2022, MohBad accused his manager, singer Naira Marley, of assault and stated that his former boss ordered people to beat him up after he announced his intention to employ a different manager to handle his music and business affairs.

After MohBad's death, it was reported that he had filed a police report in June 2023 alleging that Samson Erinfolami Balogun, a music promoter nicknamed "Sam Larry" and a known associate of Marley's, had assaulted him and destroyed some of his property. In the report, MohBad said that Larry had interrupted a video shoot, leading a group of 15 men armed with firearms and cutlasses who claimed to work for monarch Oba Elegushi. Police later said MohBad had not attended a subsequent meeting to address the allegations, and that Balogun and others accused of the assault had then filed a defamation complaint. Elegushi released a statement distancing himself from Balogun and expressing condolences on MohBad's death.

== Personal life and death ==
MohBad and his wife, Omawunmi, had a son who was born in April 2023. On 12 September 2023, MohBad died at the age of 27 after being treated for an infection by an unlicensed nurse, who was later arrested. Police subsequently announced they would investigate the circumstances of the singer's death after his body was exhumed on 21 September 2023.

== Discography ==
=== EPs ===
List of studio extended plays, with selected details and chart positions
Title	Details	Peak chart positions
Title	Details	NG
Light	Released: 18 December 2020; Label: Marlian Music; Formats: Digital download	7
Blessed	Released: 30 June 2023; Label: Imolenization; Formats: Digital download	1

==== As lead artist ====
List of singles as lead artist, with year released and album shown
Title	Year	Peak chart positions						Certifications	Album
Title	Year	NG	NG Streetpop	SA	UK	UK Afrobeats	US Afrobeats	Certifications	Album
"BB2 Poverty"	2019	—	—	—	—	—	—		TBA
"Mi O Foh"	2019	—	—	—	—	—	—		TBA
"Owoale" (feat. Lil Frosh & C Blvck)	2019	—	—	—	—	—	—		TBA
"Neon" (feat. Updateboyz, Dope Sticks & JerryClef)	2019	—	—	—	—	—	—		TBA
"Imole"	2019	—	—	—	—	—	—		TBA
"Oja" (feat. Oladips)	2019	—	—	—	—	—	—		TBA
"Balan Zia Gar"	2019	—	—	—	—	—	—		TBA
"Mio Foh"	2020	—	—	—	—	—	—		TBA
"Komajensun" (feat. Naira Marley)	2020	—	—	—	—	—	—		TBA
"Ponmo" (feat. Naira Marley & Lil Kesh)	2020	—	—	—	—	—	—		Light
"Cinderella"	2020	—	—	—	—	—	—		Light
""KPK (Ko Por Ke)"" (with. Rexxie)	2020	53	16	—	—	—	—		A True Champion
"Feel Good"	2021	7	4	—	—	20	33		TBA
"Backside"	2021	69	21	—	—	—	—		TBA
"Ronaldo"	2022	38	13	—	—	—	—		TBA
"Peace"	2022	5	2	—	—	—	23	TCSN: Platinum	TBA
"Tiff"	2022	49	17	—	—	—	—		TBA
"Weekend"	2022	32	11	—	—	—	—		TBA
"Ask About Me"	2023	1	1	—	—	9	24		Blessed
"Hallelujah"	2023	—	—	—	—	—	—		TBA
"Jah is my Confidence"	2023	—	—	—	—	—	—		TBA

== Awards and nominations ==
Year	Award	Category	Result	Ref.
2023	Headies Award Nomination	Best Street-Hop Artist	Nominated	
2021	Audiomack	Top 21 Afrobeat artists of 2021	Ranked 12th	
2021	The Beatz Awards 2021; Some of Mohbad's songs received nominations in five different categories	AFRO Pop Producer of the Year: Rexxie – Kopoke (KPK) – Rexxie Ft. Mohbad	Nominated	
2021	The Beatz Awards 2021; Some of Mohbad's songs received nominations in five different categories	Afro Dancehall Producer of the Year: Niphkeys – Feel Good – Mohbad	Nominated	
2021	The Beatz Awards 2021; Some of Mohbad's songs received nominations in five different categories	Producer of the Year: Rexxie, KPK – Rexxie Ft. Mohbad	Won	
2021	The Beatz Awards 2021; Some of Mohbad's songs received nominations in five different categories	Producer of the Year: Niphkeys – Feel Good – Mohbad	Nominated	
2021	The Beatz Awards 2021; Some of Mohbad's songs received nominations in five different categories	Mixing and Mastering Engineer of the Year: Timi Jay – Feel Good – Mohbad	Won	
2020	City People Music Award	Revelation of the Year	Nominated	
2020	City People Music Award	Street Song of the Year	Nominated	

== See also ==
- List of Nigerian musicians
