= Memory Card (EP) =

2023 extended play by Seyi Vibez

EP by Seyi Vibez
- Released: 6 January 2023
- Recorded: Lagos
- Studio: Dvpper Studios
- Genres: Afrobeats; Street pop
- Length: 10:58
- Labels: Vibez Inc; Dvpper Music
- Producers: Dapper (EP); Seyi Vibez (EP); Dibs; TBM

Seyi Vibez chronology
Billion Dollar Baby (2022)	Memory Card (2023)	Vibe Till Thy Kingdom Come (2023)

Memory Card is the second extended play by Nigerian street-pop singer Seyi Vibez. It was released on 6 January 2023, through Vibez Inc, and Dvpper Music. The extended play included guest appearances from American singer YXNG K.A. It was executively produced by Dvpper Music founder and CEO Dapper, and Seyi Vibez, along with production from Dibs, and TBM. The extended play is a mixture of Afrobeats, and Street-pop.

== Background ==
In 2023, Seyi Vibez announced the release of his EP, 5 days into the new year on social media.

== Critical reception ==
Uzoma Ihejirika, a music reporter for The Native stated that “On ‘Memory Card,’ Seyi Vibez’s songwriting is as scattergun as it can be. On each song (and even on each verse) he employs an ear-catching rap-like delivery that demands a listener’s participation because he sounds so sure of whatever falls out of his mouth. The biggest flaw of ‘Memory Card’ is its production quality, with the instrumentals coming off sometimes as skeletal and unfinished. Nevertheless, the project could be an indication of the direction Seyi Vibez has chosen to ply; if so, 2023 is going to be a big year for the music act who has continuously managed to hit new highs”.

In a review for MoreBranches, Patrick Ezema said: “Memory Card is as close as he’s come to the completion of his arc, but it’s important to recall his journey here. His 2021 album, No Seyi No Vibez (NSNV), was a perfectly adequate Street Pop piece, as he chronicled his desire to make it out of the hood, in location and status, over traditional Afropop beats. As good as it was a debut, NSNV couldn’t provide the spark he needed to announce himself in the music scene”.

=== Rankings ===
Select rankings of Memory Card
Publication	List	Rank	Ref.
TurnTable	TurnTable's The 2023 Nigerian Mid-Year Charts	14	

== Commercial performance ==
On 21 January 2023, TurnTable report, Memory Card tallied 6.28 million streams in Nigeria during the week of January 6 – 12, 2022. This represents the biggest debut week for any of the two (or three if you count deluxe as a project) projects the artiste has released in the last three months.

== Track listing ==
Memory Card - Standard edition
No.	Title	Writer(s)	Length
1.	"G.O.A.T"	Oluwaloseyi	1:50
2.	"Para Boi"	Oluwaloseyi	2:37
3.	"Alaska"	Oluwaloseyi	2:29
4.	"IG Story"	Oluwaloseyi	2:16
5.	"Love is war" (feat. YXNG K.A)	Oluwaloseyi; YXNG K.A	2:02
Total length:			10:58

Bonus
No.	Title	Writer(s)	Length
6.	"Ife (album version)"	Oluwaloseyi	2:18
Total length:			13:16

== Charts ==
Weekly chart performance for Memory Card
Chart (2023)	Peak position
Nigeria Albums (TurnTable)	3
