= Timi Jan =

Timi Jan تيميجان
- Village
- Location within Iran
- Coordinates: 34°41′25″N 48°20′29″E
- Country: Iran
- Province: Hamadan
- County: Tuyserkan
- Bakhsh: Central
- Rural District: Khorram Rud

Population (2006)
  - Total: 291
- Time zone: UTC+3:30 (IRST)
  - Summer (DST): UTC+4:30 (IRDT)

Timi Jan (Persian: تيميجان, also Romanized as Tīmī Jān; also known as Tīmjān) is a village in Khorram Rud Rural District, in the Central District of Tuyserkan County, Hamadan Province, Iran. At the 2006 census, its population was 291, in 79 families.
