= Ijurin =

Town in Ekiti State, Nigeria

Ijurin Ijurin Ekiti
- Town
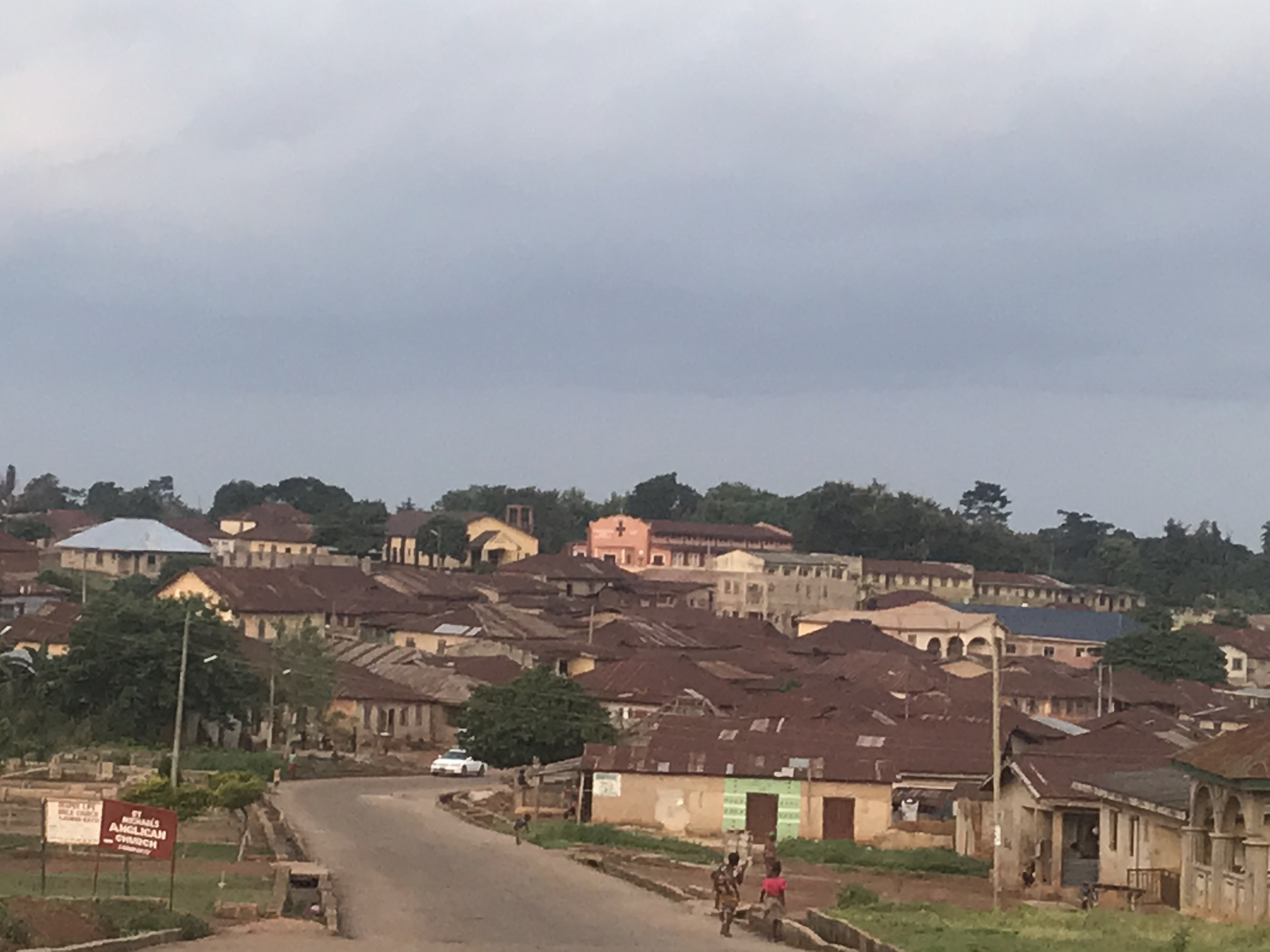
- View of Ijurin

- Location in Nigeria
- Coordinates: 7°53′20″N 5°06′31″E
- Country: Nigeria
- State: Ekiti
- Time zone: UTC+1 (WAT)
- Climate: Aw

Ijurin Ekiti is a town in Ijero local government area of Ekiti State, Nigeria. It is one of the towns in the old Ijero kingdom which migrated from Ile Ife settling at different locations, before settling at this present location.
