= T-Classic =

Nigerian singer and songwriter

- Born: Tolulope Ajayi; 10 October 1997 (age 28); Agege, Lagos, (Olambe) Nigeria
- Genres: Afropop
- Occupations: Singer; songwriter
- Years active: 2016–present

Tolulope Ajayi (born 10 November 1997) better known by his stage name T-Classic, is a Nigerian singer, songwriter and recording artiste. In 2017, T-Classic released his lead single "I want you" produced by Killertunes. In 2019, the singer released "Think about it" which turned out to be the turning point in his career.

== Early life ==
T-Classic was born and raised in Agege. He is the first-born child of the Ajayi family. In 2013, Tolulope graduated from Royal Camp Comprehensive High School, Agege, Lagos. He attended Legacy Nursery and Primary School. On graduating Tolulope Ajayi was signed to Bang Music Entertainment.

== Career ==
On August 9, 2019 T-Classic was featured on the third official single "Yes or No" by DJ KayWise. The song speaks love. In 2019, T-Classic song "Nobody Fine Pass You" won Most Popular Song of the Year and was nominated for Most Promising Act of the Year at City People Music Awards.

On February 7, 2020, Sony Music West Africa announced that T-Classic had joined the label's list of artistes. On February 23, 2020, he released his first EP project "Underrated" two weeks after being signed to Sony Music West Africa which featured Nigerian Disc Jockey "DJ Xclusive" . On July 21, 2019 T-Classic was featured on a live radio interview with Blessing. On 4 August 2019, Day 35 of the Reality TV Show Big Brother Naija Season 4, T-Classic performed on stage and sang one of his songs, "Nobody Fine Pass You".

== Awards and nomination ==
Year	Award ceremony	Prize	Recipient	Result	Ref
2018	City People Music Awards	Most Promising Act of the Year	Himself	Nominated	
2018	City People Music Awards	Best New Act of the Year	Himself	Nominated	
2019	City People Music Awards	Popular Song of the Year	"Nobody Fine Pass You"	Won	
2019	City People Music Awards	Most Promising Act of the Year	Himself	Nominated	
2019	City People Music Awards	Best New Act of the Year	Himself	Nominated	
2019	City People Music Awards	Revelation of the Year	Himself	Nominated	
