= DJ Kaywise =

Nigerian DJ

DJ KayWise
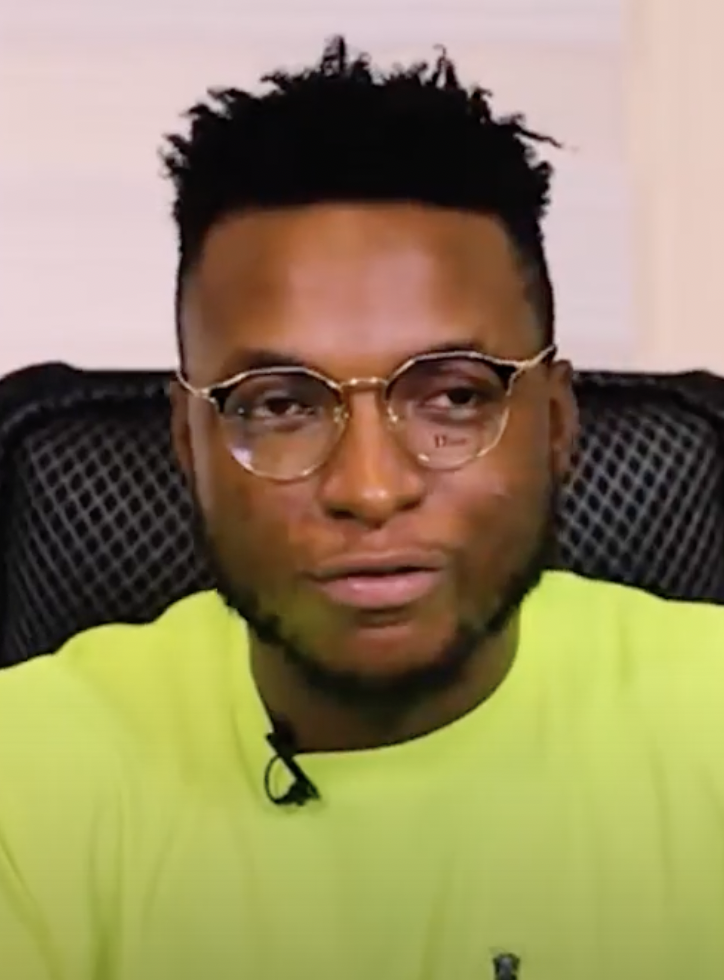

Background information
- Also known as: DJ KayWise
- Born: Ayorinde Kehinde Okiki; August 4, 1992 (age 33)
- Origin: Osun State, Nigeria
- Genres: Afrobeats
- Occupations: Disc Jockey; Record Producer
- Instruments: TurnTable
- Years active: 2010–present
- Label: KayWise Entertainment
- Website: www.djkaywise.ng

Ayorinde Kehinde Okiki (born 4 August 1992), known professionally as DJ Kaywise is a Nigerian disc jockey and record producer. Kaywise broke into the mixtape market in Alaba in the year 2010. He has since gained prominence as a DJ in Nigeria and has released chart topping songs with many Nigerian music stars. He is known for the street slang “Joor” or “Kaywise joor joor” and has since made it a ritual concert for his fans tagged “Joor concert”

== Early life ==
DJ Kaywise was born in Lagos, Nigeria on August 4, 1992. He is originally from Ile Ife in Osun state. He was brought up in Lagos State where he completed his elementary and secondary school. He gained prominence after releasing the mixtape titled "Emergency" which was a combination of songs in the country at the time.

== Career ==
DJ Kaywise started his career as a record producer but later picked interest in being a Disc Jockey. He started his journey as a DJ in 2010 and came into the limelight after his "Emergency" mixtape broke into the mixtape market in Alaba market in Lagos. He has so far released over 10,000 CD Mixtape, over 50 online mixtape and multiple music and visuals with Nigerian and African artistes.

Kaywise released his debut single in 2012 titled "Hangover" featuring Dammy Krane and Yung 6ix. In 2013, he featured Iyanya on a single titled "Loyalist". He has released singles with Nigerian musicians including Mayorkun, Naira Marley, Tiwa Savage, Olamide, Vector and Ice Prince. He kickstarted his DJ academy in 2019 called Kaywise Academy. He then released a mixtape titled "Revolution Mix Vol1" in solidarity with the EndSars movement that started in Nigeria in 2020. In August 2020, his single "What Type of Dance" featuring Mayorkun, Naira Marley and Zlatan Ibile peaked at number 5 on the Billboard Top Triller Global chart. His recently released song "High Way" featuring Phyno dropped in December 2020. The single peaked at number 7 after spending two weeks on the Billboard Top Triller Global Chart.

=== The Joor Concert ===
DJ Kaywise hosted the maiden edition of his street concert titled " The Joor Concert" in 2016. He mentioned in an interview that the first four editions of the concert had an attendance record of over 50,000 (Unverifiable) DJ Kaywise had the fifth edition of his annual street concert in January 2020. Over the years, The Joor Concert has been hosted in different cities across the country and has had two editions in London and Dubai respectively.

== Discography ==
=== Mixtapes ===
- Good TImes Mixtape
- Best of The Mavins & Friends
- Revolution Mix Vol 1
- Joor, Vol. 1 & 2 (featuring Emmyblaq)

=== Singles ===
- "Hangover" (featuring Dammy Krane and Yung6ix) (2012)
- "Loyalist" (featuring Iyanya) (2013)
- "Feel Alright" (featuring Ice Prince, Patoranking and R2bees) (2014)
- "Warn Dem" (featuring Oritsefemi) (2015)
- "Ibeji" (featuring Olamide and Vector) (2015)
- "Informate" (featuring Tiwa Savage) (2017)
- "Caro" (2016)
- "Juju" (featuring B-RED) (2017)
- "Alert" (featuring Mr Eazi and DJ Maphorisa) (2018)
- "See Mary See Jesus" (featuring Olamide) (2018)
- "Normal Level" (featuring Ice Prince, Emmy Gee and KLY) (2018)
- "W.T.O.D" (featuring Naira Marley, Mayorkun and Zlatan Ibile) (2020)
- "HighWay" (featuring Phyno) (2021)

== Awards and nominations ==
Year	Event	Prize	Result	Ref
2014	All Youth Tush Awards (AYTA)	Best Nigerian DJ	Won	
2015	City People Entertainment Awards	DJ of the Year	Won	
2015	Nigerian Entertainment Awards	Male DJ of the Year	Won	
2021	Net Honours	Most played street hop song - "HighWay" (featuring Phyno)	Won	
2021	Net Honours	Most played alternative song - "HighWay" (featuring Phyno)	Nominated	
