= Rexxie =

Nigerian record producer (born 1994)

- Born: Ezeh Chisom Faith; November 10, 1994 (age 31); Lagos, Nigeria
- Origin: Anambra State, Nigeria
- Genres: Pop music; Streetpop; Afro pop music; Afropiano
- Occupations: Record producer, singer
- Years active: 2018–present
- Labels: Hitxlab, Dvpper

Ezeh Chisom Faith (born 10 November 1994), professionally known as Rexxie, is a Nigerian record producer, DJ, and songwriter. He is popular for creating the Zanku sound, and producing Naira Marley's Soapy, Tesumole and the song KPK with MohBad.

== Early life and education ==
Rexxie was born on 10 November, 1994 in Lagos State, south-western region of Nigeria. Rexxie played the keyboard at his father's church as a child. His father was a pastor. He had his basic education in Abuja and Lagos where he was raised, he attended Yaba College of Technology and graduated from the Tai Solarin University of Education.

== Career ==
Rexxie's career breakout came when he produced "Able God" in 2018 for Chinko Ekun featuring, Zlatan Ibile and Lil Kesh. He also produced "Zanku" for Zlatan Ibile the following year.

Rexxie produced songs like Comma and Bebo on the Grammy-winning album Twice As Tall by Burna Boy.

Rexxie has produced Nigerian music for the likes of Zlatan, Naira Marley, Davido, and Burna Boy.

Rexxie released studio album A True Champion on June 28, 2021, which featured artists like Zlatan Ibile, Davido, Naira Marley, Zinoleesky, MohBad, Sarkodie, Peruzzi.

== Production discography ==
=== Singles produced ===
Artiste	Title	Reference
Chinko Ekun feat. Zlatan Ibile and Lil Kesh	“Able God”	
Davido	"Bum Bum"	
Zlatan Ibile	“Zanku”	
Sarkodie	“Number”	
Naira Marley	"Tesumole"	
Naira Marley	"Mafo”	
Sarkodie	"No Fugazy"	
Naira Marley	“Aye”	
Naira Marley	“Puta”	
Naira Marley	“Soapy”	
Mohbad	"KpK"	
MohBad	"Peace"	
Burna Boy	"Bebo”	
Naira Marley featuring Busiswa	"Coming”	
Bella Shmurda	"Dagbana Orisa"	
Bella Shmurda	“Back2Back”	
Asake	“Banger”	
Burna Boy	“Comma”	
Tolibian featuring Rexxie	“Beware of Dogs”	
Samsix	“Shinning Star”	

=== Studio albums and EP ===
- AfroStreet The EP (2020)
- A True Champion (2021)
- Nataraja (2021)
- Big Time (2023)

== Awards and nominations ==
Year	Event	Prize	Recipient	Result	Ref
2020	City People Entertainment Awards	Best Producer Of the year	Himself	Won	
2020	Soundcity MVP Awards Festival	Best Producer Of the year	Himself	Won	
2021	Net Honours	Most played Street Hop song	"KPK"	Nominated	
2021	Net Honours	Most played Hip Hop song	"KPK"	Nominated	
2021	The Beatz Awards	Producer of the Year	Himself ("KPK")	Won	
2021	The Beatz Awards	Afro Pop Producer of the Year	Himself	Nominated	
2021	The Beatz Awards	Afrobeat Producer of the Year	Himself	Nominated	
2021	The Beatz Awards	Afro Highlife Producer of the Year	Himself	Nominated	

producer of the year (HEADIES)
