= Benson Idonije =

Nigerian broadcaster and music critic

- Born: 13 June 1936 (age 89); Otuo, Owan East, Edo State, Nigeria
- Occupations: broadcaster; music critic
- Years active: 1957–present
- Relatives: Burna Boy (grandson)

Benson Idonije (born 13 June 1936) is a Nigerian broadcaster and music critic popularly known for being the first band manager of Afrobeat musician Fela Kuti. Regarded as one of Nigeria's most revered music critics, he was part of the pioneering group of broadcasters who started Radio Nigeria 2 (now Metro FM) in 1977.

== Early life and education ==
Idonije was born in Otuo, with his family house at ighera, one of the twelve quarters of Otuo, a town in Owan East local government area of Edo State, Nigeria, where he began his early education. He completed his secondary school education at Holy Trinity Grammar School, Sabongida Ora, where he obtained a Cambridge School Certificate before proceeding to Yaba College of Technology where he studied Communications Engineering.

== Career ==
Idonije started writing about jazz-related articles and columns for several newspapers including the Morning Post Newspaper in 1953. In 1957, he began his career as an Engineering Assistant at the Nigerian Broadcasting Corporation (now Federal Radio Corporation of Nigeria) before he moved into mainstream broadcasting in 1960, presenting and anchoring popular on-air programmes such as The Big Beat and Stereo Jazz Club. Prior to his retirement from broadcasting in 1992, he was once appointed as the Principal Lecturer and Training Officer of the FRCN Training School for eight years. Upon his retirement, he began to write and contribute critiques, opinions and articles to several art-related media houses in Nigeria before he got a job as a writer for The Guardian in 1996 where he wrote columns including "Evergreen", "Sound and Screen" and "All That Jazz".

== Recognitions ==
In 2012, The Wole Soyinka Centre for Investigative Journalism awarded him the Life Time Award for Journalism Excellence. He is a fellow of Adam Fiberesima School of Music and Conservatory, University of Port Harcourt.

== Published books ==
- Dis Fela Sef
- The Great Highlife Party
- All That Jazz

== Personal life ==
Idonije is the grandfather of Nigerian singer Burna Boy and the father of Bose Ogulu. To celebrate his 80th birthday, a week-long event featuring paper presentations and musical performances was organized by the Committee of Relevant Arts and Culture Advocates Caucus in several parts of Lagos including the Ojo campus of the Lagos State University, Freedom Park, Broad Street and the MUSON Centre.
