= Seyi Vibez =

Nigerian singer-songwriter (born 2000)

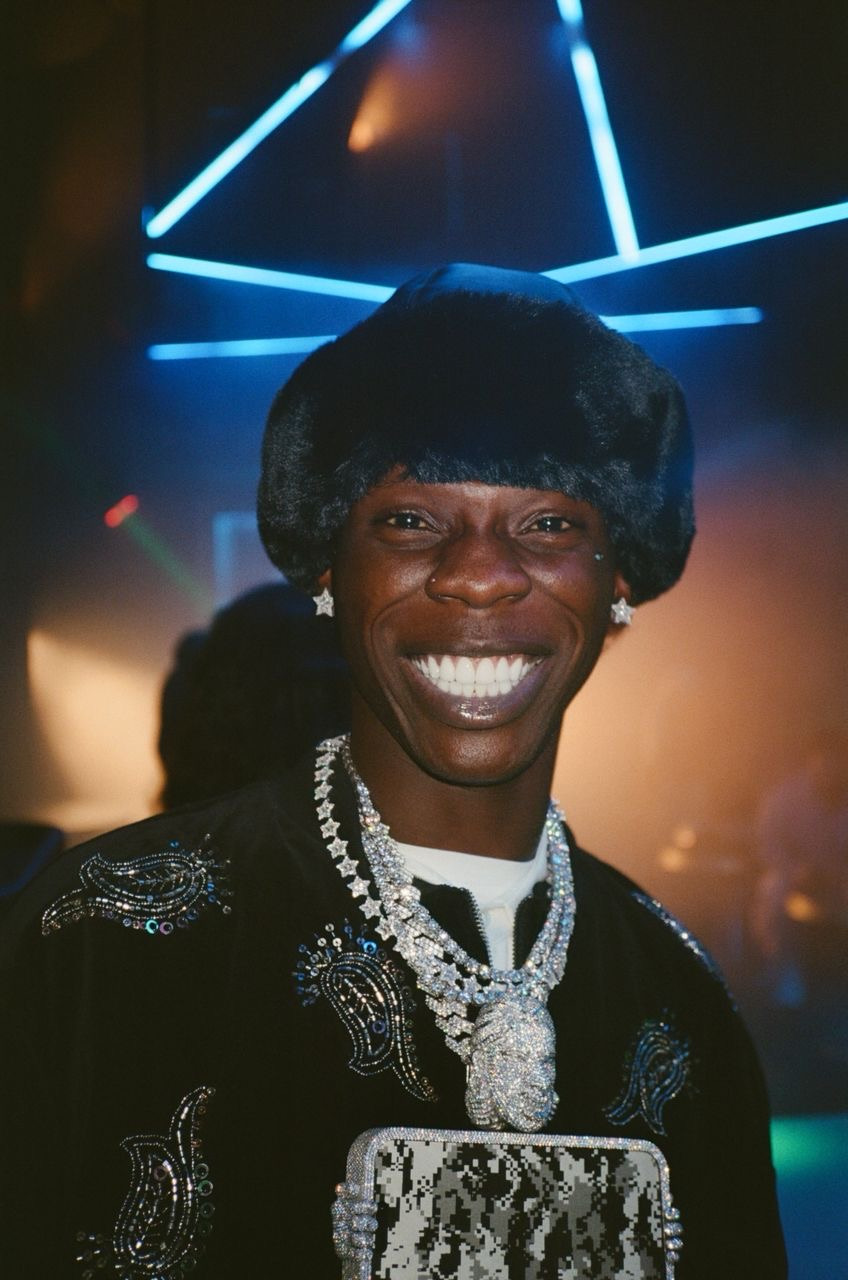

Background information
- Born: Balogun Afolabi Oluwaloseyi; 12 July 2000 (age 26); Lagos, Nigeria
- Genres: Street pop; fuji; Afrobeats
- Occupations: Singer; Songwriter
- Years active: 2014–present
- Labels: NSNV Inc; Empire

YouTube information
- Channel: Seyi Vibez
- Subscribers: 555,000
- Views: 355,870,507
- Last updated: 7 October 2026

Balogun Afolabi Oluwaloseyi (born 12 July 2000), known professionally as Seyi Vibez, is a Nigerian singer and songwriter. He rose to prominence in 2023 with the single "Chance (Na Ham)", which debuted at No. 19 on the UK Afrobeats singles chart and peaked number 7 on the TurnTable Top 100 chart.

Known for his prolific output, Seyi Vibez released the number-one albums Billion Dollar Baby (2022) and Swaguu (2026), the latter of which was executive-produced by Burna Boy.

== Early life ==
Balogun Afolabi Oluwaloseyi was born on 12 July 2000, in Ketu, Lagos State. His family moved to Ikorodu when he was 13 years old. Oluwaloseyi was raised in an Islamic household. He grew up in poverty, stating that his family urged him to leave the house at age 15 to hustle on his own.

In 2014, Oluwaloseyi was brought to a local studio in Ikorodu by a friend and recorded his first song. Upon returning home, his mother gave him her blessing to pursue music, on the condition that he finishes school. Oluwaloseyi was signed to a record label at 17, but was later dropped. He subsequently began an independent career. Prior to publishing his music, Oluwaloseyi recalled "basically living like a studio rat" in order to find his musical sound.

== Career ==
=== 2019-2022: Career beginnings, NSNV, and Billion Dollar Baby ===
Seyi Vibez debuted on 19 May 2019 with his single "Anybody". He first gained popularity in 2020 following the release of his single "Godsent". The following year he released the EP NSNV (initialism for No Seyi No Vibez).

His debut studio album Billion Dollar Baby was released on 2 November 2022, The album peaked number 1 on the TurnTable Top 50 Albums Chart, and was supported by the viral success of the track "Chance (Na Ham). The same year he was cited as one of the 16 African artists to watch by MoreBranches. On 9 December 2022 Seyi Vibez released the deluxe edition to Billion Dollar Baby.

=== 2023: Memory Card, Thy Kingdom Come, and Nahamciaga ===
On 6 January 2023, Seyi Vibez released his 5 tracked debut extended play, Memory Card, with a guest feature from American rapper YXNG K.A. In the first week of launching the EP, it garnered over 6.30 million streams in its first week, with Pan African Music listing it as one of the top ten best albums of January 2023.

On 2 February 2023, Seyi Vibez appeared on the single "Let There Be Light" by fellow Nigerian singer Zlatan. The song debuted at No. 14 on Apple Music's Top 100 Nigeria chart. On 29 May 2023, Seyi Vibez released the single "Hat-trick", which became the lead single to his next project Vibe Till Thy Kingdom Come which released in June, becoming his third project in nine months. This was shortly followed up with his next studio album, Thy Kingdom Come on 23 June.

In August 2023, Seyi Vibez featured on the songs "Unleash" by Kizz Daniel and "Giza" by Burna Boy. In the same month, Seyi Vibez was announced as a brand ambassador of Cardtonic, a gift card exchange platform in Nigeria and Ghana.

In September 2023, At the 16th Headies Award, Seyi Vibez won the Best Street-Hop Artiste with the single "Chance (Na Ham)". In October he appeared on the track "Area Boyz Prayer" with NSG. On 8 December 2023 Seyi Vibez released the EP Nahamciaga.

=== 2024: Loseyi Professor ===
On 8 February 2024, Seyi Vibez appeared on the track "Mamba" alongside Bella Shmurda and LarryLanes. He then appeared on the remix to the track "Fakosi" by Reekado on 15 February.

In April 2024, Seyi Vibez released the song "Instagram" featuring Muyeez, an artist he signed under the newly formed Vibez Inc record label. On 2 May 2024 he released the song "Ogo" with British rapper Tion Wayne. Throughout the next six days Seyi Vibez released songs with the rest of the artists signed to Vibez Inc. During this period he also appeared on "Bad Vibes" by Ayra Starr. On 16 May 2024, Seyi Vibez was nominated for the Best New International Act award at the BET Awards. The next month he appeared on the track "Apala Disco" by DJ Tunez alongside Wizkid and Terry Apala. On 12 July 2024 Seyi Vibez released the EP Loseyi Professor.

=== 2025-present: Fuji Moto and Swaguu ===
On 20 February 2025, Seyi Vibez surprise-released the EP Children of Africa. On 21 May he released the single "Pressure", his first release under Empire Distribution. On 28 October Seyi Vibez released the single "How Are You". On 13 November 2024, Seyi Vibez released the studio album Fuji Moto. On 14 November he appeared on the track "YSF" by rapper Wale alongside Teni.

On December 3, 2025, Seyi Vibez emerged the second most streamed artist on Spotify Nigeria in 2025. On 10 December he featured on the track "Richer" by British rapper J Hus. On 21 January 2026 Seyi Vibez released the song "My Healer" with Omah Lay. On 4 June he appeared on "Opera Mini" by Poco Lee. On 3 July Seyi Vibez featured on "Peppa" by MetaBoy. A week later he appeared on "Won Da" by 1da Banton.

On 30 July 2026, Seyi Vibez released the single "GTA". On 27 August he followed up with "Back 2 U". Then on 17 September he released the studio album Swaguu. The album was executive produced by Burna Boy. The first track "Volume" achieved 5.95 million streams in its first week, becoming the first number-one song to achieve the feat only with streaming.

== Personal life ==
On 16 March 2023, Seyi Vibez announced the death of his mother, describing it as the "darkest day" of his life.

== Discography ==
=== Studio albums ===
- Billion Dollar Baby (2022)
- Vibe Till Thy Kingdom Come (2023)
- Thy Kingdom Come (2023)
- Loseyi Professor (2024)
- Fuji Moto (2025)
- Swaguu (2026)

=== EPs ===
- No Seyi, No Vibez (2021)
- Memory Card (2023)
- Nahamciaga (2023)
- Children of Africa (2025)

== Awards and nominations ==
Year	Awards ceremony	Award description(s)	Nominated work	Results	Ref
2023	The Headies	Next Rated	Himself	Nominated	
2023	The Headies	Best Collaboration	Himself	Won	
2023	The Headies	Best Street-Hop Artiste	Himself	Won	
2024	BET Awards	Best New International Act	Himself	Nominated	
2024	The Headies	Best Street-Hop Artiste	Himself	Nominated	
2025	The Headies	Best Afrobeat Pop Single	Himself	Nominated	
2025	The Headies	Viewer's Choice	"Big Big Things"	Nominated	
2025	The Headies	Viewer's Choice	Himself	Nominated	
2025	The Headies	Best Recording of the Year	Himself	Nominated	
2025	AAEA Awards	Best Male Artist West Africa	Himself	Won	
