= Zinoleesky =

Nigerian singer (born 2000)

- Also known as: Banku
- Born: Oniyide Adigun Azeez; 21 April 2000 (age 26); Agege, Lagos state, Nigeria
- Origin: Nigeria
- Genres: Street pop; pop rap
- Occupations: Singer; rapper; songwriter
- Label: Zinodict Music
- Formerly of: Marlian Music

Oniyide Azeez (born 21 April 2000), known professionally as Zinoleesky, is a Nigerian singer, songwriter and rapper. His rise to fame began on social media with freestyles and skits with his childhood friend Lil Frosh. He became known properly with the launch of his debut project Chrome Eccentric containing hit tracks like "Ma Pariwo" and "Kilofeshe."

== Early life ==
Zinoleesky, born on April 21, 2000, in Lagos State to Mr. and Mrs. Oniyide, originally hails from Ogun State, Nigeria. Raised in Agege, Lagos State, Azeez attended Lively Kiddies Nursery and Primary School for his primary education, and later, State high School Oyewole Agege, Lagos State, for his secondary education.

== Career ==
Zinoleesky found his love for music during his adolescence, initially venturing into freestyle rap. However, his breakthrough came in 2017 when his videos gained viral traction online, propelling him to popularity.

Several reports showed that he was offered a record deal by Davido's DMW label but refused to accept the offer and chose to work as an independent artist. On 23 December 2019, he was signed to the record label "Marlian Records" which is owned and managed by Nigerian singer, Naira Marley.

Zinoleesky released his debut studio album titled Chrome Eccentric in 2020, a year after signing with Marlian Records. The album comprised six tracks, including the songs "Mapariwo" and "Kilofeshe". In September 2020, Ma Pariwo ranked as No. 14 on Apple Music Chart and No. 12 on YouTube Chart.

A year after the release of his first album, Zinoleesky created a remix to the hit song "Kilofeshe" featuring Maryorkun and South African singer, Busiswa.

In December 2022, he released his first EP Grit and Lust, containing tracks such as "Call of Duty" and "YanYanYan".

== Personal life ==
In October 2021, Zinoleesky and Naira Marley's sister, Shubomi made headlines with several speculations that they were dating. In January 2023, he announced that he was single. In December 2023, he welcomed his first child, a daughter named Zendaya.

== Discography ==
=== Album ===
Title	Album details	Peak chart positions
Title	Album details	US World
Grit and Lust	Released: 23 December 2022; Label: Marlian; Format: Digital download, streaming	—
Gen Z	Released: 25 April 2025; Label: Marlian; Format: Digital download, streaming	9

Extended plays (EPs)

Title	EP details
Chrome Eccentric	Released: 13 December 2020; Label: Marlian Records; Format: Digital download, streaming

=== Singles ===
As lead artist
Year	Title	Ref.
2019	"Joromi"	
2019	"Popo"	
2019	"Firi Yoyo"	
2019	"Money" (featuring Zlatan)	
2019	"Who Knows" (featuring Lil Frosh)	
2020	"Caro"	
2020	"End Sars"	
2021	"Kilofeshe" (Remix)	
2021	"Naira Marley"	
2021	"Gone Far"	
2021	"Blessings"	
2021	"Loving You"	
2022	"Call of Duty"	
2023	"Sunny Ade"	
2024	"Element"	
2024	"Abanikanda" (featuring Naira Marley)	
2025	Lifestyle	
2025	"Fuji Garbage" (featuring Chief Dr. Sikiru Ayinde Barrister (MFR))	

=== Official videos ===
- "Caro" (2020)
- "Kilofeshe" (2021)
- "Naira Marley" (2022)
- "Gone Far" (2022)
- "Rocking" (2022)
- "Loving You" (2022)
- "Call of Duty" (2022)
- "Personal" (2023)
- "YanYanYan" (2023)
- "Last Time" (2023)

== Tours ==
UK Tour

== Awards and nominations ==
Year	Award	Category	Nominee/Work	Result	Ref
2020	The Headies	Rookie of the Year	"Mapariwo"	Nominated	
2020	City People Music Award	Next Rated Artiste (Male Category)	Himself	Nominated	
2022	The Headies	Next Rated	Himself	Nominated	
