= Zlatan (musician) =

Nigerian rapper and singer (born 1994)

- Also known as: Zlatan Ibile, Kapaichumarimarichupako, World President, Zlanti
- Born: Omoniyi Temidayo Raphael; 19 December 1994 (age 31); Lagos, Nigeria
- Genres: Afrobeats; hip hop; Street pop
- Occupations: Rapper; singer; songwriter; dancer
- Years active: 2014–present
- Label: Zanku Records

Omoniyi Temidayo Raphael (born 19 December 1994), known professionally as Zlatan Ibile or simply Zlatan, is a Nigerian rapper and singer. He is the CEO and founder of Zanku records. In 2014, he won the Airtel-sponsored One Mic talent show held in Abeokuta, Ogun State.

He named himself after the famous footballer Zlatan Ibrahimović, as he earlier dreamt of a career in soccer. Towards the end of 2018, ZLATAN released a single titled "Zanku", with a flagship dance routine of the same name. Based on the acceptance of the song, the name and the dance, on the 3rd of November 2019, Zlatan released his debut studio album with the same name Zanku, an acronym meaning “Zlatan Abeg No Kill Us”.

== Early life and career ==
Omoniyi Temidayo Raphael was born and raised in Ikorodu, Lagos State but has family roots in Ijurin, Ekiti State. In 2011, he graduated with a national diploma in business administration from Moshood Abiola Polytechnic. Raphael decided to pursue a career in music after graduating secondary school. When he was 19 years old, he won the Airtel-sponsored 2014 edition of "One Mic Campus Tour" music competition, which was held in Abeokuta, Ogun State. He gained recognition in 2017 after releasing "My Body", which features Olamide. In 2018, Lawrence Irabor, co-owner of Alleluyah Boiz Entertainment, signed Zlatan to the record label after hearing "My Body".

Zlatan gained further exposure following his collaboration with Chinko Ekun and Lil Kesh on the 2018 hit single "Able God". Shortly afterwards, he dropped "Zanku", a song that was accompanied by a viral dance routine of the same name. Towards the end of 2018, Zlatan released the Davido-assisted track "Osanle". In early 2019, he released "Glory" before being featured on Burna Boy's "Killin Dem", a track from the latter's fourth studio album African Giant. Shortly afterwards, he was featured on Lil kesh "Flenjo" and Naira Marley's "Am I a Yahoo Boy". On 26 July 2019, Zlatan signed an endorsement deal with Coca-Cola.

=== 2020–present: Zanku Records and EndSARS protest ===
On January 1, 2020, Raphael took to his Instagram page to announce the launch of his record label 'Zanku Records' with no artists unveiled. Down to February 25, he celebrated his birthday while he announced the numbers and names of acts he signed. He listed three artists named: Papisnoop, Oberz and Jamopyper. He also announced the official signing of a Videographer/Cinematographer named Visionary Pictures, his Manager 'Manager Jiggy', his Music Producer Rexxie and a PR ConsultantBiesloaded'. He made this announcement with a picture of him and seven other people via his Instagram page.

In October 2020, during the EndSARS protest, Zlatan released "Soro Soke" to express his concern over the alleged massacre of innocent youths at the 2020 Lekki shooting.

== Personal life ==
=== Arrest and release ===
In May 2019, the EFCC arrested Zlatan, Naira Marley and a few others in connection with an alleged case of internet fraud and money laundering. A few days later, he was released on administrative bail.

Spouse

In July 2026, Zlatan and his longtime partner Davita Lamai publicly announced plans for their upcoming wedding. The couple made the announcement during a private jet trip with industry colleagues, including singer Teni and media personality Toke Makinwa, while attending the wedding of music executive Soso Soberekon in Lagos. They confirmed that wedding preparations were underway, following years together after welcoming their first child in 2020 and second child in 2024. In October 2026, Zlatan married his partner, Davita, in a star-studded wedding ceremony in Lagos State, attended by numerous Nigerian celebrities including Davido, Teni, Iyabo Ojo, Phyno, and Cubana Chief Priest.

== Discography ==
Studio albums

- Zanku (2019)
- Resan (2021)
- Symbol of Hope (2025)

EPs

- Omo Ologo (2023)

=== Singles ===
As lead artist

Year	Title	Album	Ref
2016	"Odun Yi" (featuring Spaceboi)	Non-album single	
2017	"Omoge"	Non-album single	
2017	"My Body" (featuring Olamide)	Non-album single	
2018	"Jogor" (featuring Lil Kesh and Naira Marley)	Non-album single	
2018	"Zanku (Legwork)"	Non-album single	
2018	"Oja"	Non-album single	
2018	"Osanle" (featuring Davido)	Non-album single	
2019	"This Year"	Non-album single	
2019	"4 Days in Ekohtiebo"	Non-album single	
2019	"Killin Dem" (with Burna Boy)	African Giant	
2019	"Shotan" (featuring Tiwa Savage)	Zanku	
2019	"kokosa" (featuring Juls, Damibliz, Jorlasi)		
2019	"Bolanle" (with IVD)	Non-album single	
2019	"Gbeku" (featuring Burna Boy)	Zanku	
2019	"Yeye Boyfriend"	Zanku	
2020	"Quilox"	Non-album single	
2020	"Unripe Pawpaw" (featuring Papisnoop, Jamo Pyper and Oberz)	Non-album single	
2020	"The Matter"	Non-album single	
2020	"Soro Soke"	Non-album single	
2020	"Lagos Anthem"	Non-album single	
2021	"Alubarika" (featuring Buju )	Resan	
2021	"Ale Yi"	Resan	
2023	"Omo Ologo"	Non-album single	
2024	"10 Bottles"	Non-album single	
2024	"Bust Down" (featuring Asake)	Non-album single	
2024	"Gimme your Love" (featuring Olamide)	Non-album single	
2025	"Get Better" (featuring Fola)	Non-album single	
2025	"Happy Day"	Non-album single	

As featured artist

Year	Title	Album	Ref
2019	"Jo" (Dammy Krane featuring Zlatan and Olamide)	Non-album single	
2019	"Am I a Yahoo Boy" (Naira Marley featuring Zlatan)	Non-album single	
2019	"Kowope" (HDT featuring Zlatan and GCN)	Non-album single	
2019	"Flenjo" (Ceeza Milli featuring Zlatan)	Non-album single	
2019	Lock Up (Davolee ft. Zlatan)	Non-album single	
2019	"Chacha" (Remix) (Harrysong featuring Zlatan)	Non-album single	
2019	"Onye Eze 2.0" (CDQ featuring Zlatan)	Non-album single	
2019	"Gelato" (DJ Cuppy featuring Zlatan)	Non-album single	
2020	"Chairman" (Remix) (Dremo featuring Zlatan)	Non-album single	
2020	"Pongilah" (Slimcase featuring Zlatan)	Non-album single	
2020	"Egungun" (Remix) (Obesere featuring Zlatan)	Non-album single	
2020	"Of Lala" (Rahman Jago featuring Zlatan and Jamo Pyper)	Non-album single	
2020	"Olopa" (Qdot featuring Zlatan)		
2020	"O Por" (Rexxie featuring Zlatan)	Afro Street Vol. 1	
2022	Robby Law – No Money No Konji ft. Zlatan x DennyB		

== Filmography ==
Year	Title	Role	Notes	Ref.
2023	Gangs of Lagos	Kash	Supporting role	

== Awards and nominations ==
Year	Event	Prize	Recipient	Result	Ref
2018	City People Music Awards	Rookie of the Year	Himself	Nominated	
2019	The Headies	Next Rated	Himself	Nominated	
2019	The Headies	Best Street Hop Artiste	Zlatan for "Zanku (Legwork)"	Nominated	
2019	The Headies	Best Collaboration	Burna Boy and Zlatan for "Killin Dem"	Won	
2019	The Headies	Song of the Year	"Legwork"	Nominated	
2019	African Muzik Magazine Awards	Best New Act	Himself	Won	
2019	African Muzik Magazine Awards	Best Collaboration	Burna Boy and Zlatan for "Killin Dem"	Won	
2019	African Muzik Magazine Awards	Song of the Year	"Killin Dem"	Won	
2021	Net Honours	Most Searched Actress	Most played street hop song - "Lagos Anthem"	Nominated	
2021	Net Honours	Most played street hop song	"Cash App" featuring Zlatan and Lincoln	Nominated	
2021	Net Honours	Most played Hip Hop song	"Lagos Anthem"	Nominated	

== See also ==
- List of Nigerian musicians
