= Naira Marley =

Nigerian-British musician (born 1991)

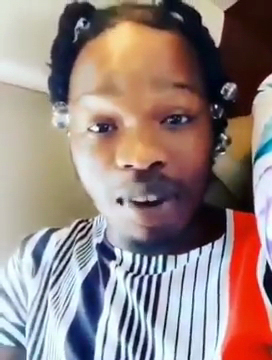

Background information
- Also known as: Marlians President. Marlians music
- Born: Azeez Adeshina Fashola; 10 May 1991 (age 35); Badagry, Lagos State, Nigeria
- Genres: Afrobeats; Hip hop; Afroswing; Street pop
- Occupations: Singer; songwriter; rapper
- Years active: 2013 – present
- Labels: Marlian Music; MOVES Recordings

Azeez Adeshina Fashola (born 10 May 1991), known professionally as Naira Marley, is a Nigerian-British singer, songwriter and rapper.His fans are fondly called Marlians. His label became home to names like MOHBAD, Zinoleesky, Vusic amongst others.

== Education ==
At the age of 11, Fashola moved to Peckham, South London, England. He graduated with a distinction in business from Peckham Academy in 2010. He also studied business law at Crossways College (now Christ the King: Aquinas Sixth Form College).

== Career ==
=== 2014 – 2018: Career beginnings ===
While growing up, Fashola had plans of becoming an MC and a voice-over artist. He began rapping in 2013 after discovering his passion for music and was encouraged by close-knit friends from the Queens Roads area in Peckham to pursue his music career. He released the Max Twigz-assisted track "Marry Juana" before releasing his debut EP Gotta Dance in 2014.

In December 2017, he released the Olamide and Lil Kesh-assisted single "Issa Goal", which became the theme song for the Super Eagles at the 2018 FIFA World Cup. The official remix of "Issa Goal" was released on 16 June 2018; it featured vocals by Olamide, Lil Kesh, Falz, Simi and Slimcase.

Marley sings in English, Pidgin and Yoruba; his musical style spans Afrobeats, Street pop and hip-hop. He derived his stage name from Jamaican singer Bob Marley, whom he admires; his dreadlocks are also a tribute to the singer.

=== 2019 – present: musical releases, Marlian Records and debut album ===
Naira Marley released the Zlatan-assisted track "Am I A Yahoo Boy" on 3 May 2019, and was arrested by the Economic and Financial Crimes Commission (EFCC) that same day. He released "Soapy" on 27 June 2019, a few days after he was released from prison. On 11 January 2020, he won Viewers' Choice for "Soapy" at the 2020 Soundcity MVP Awards.

On 18 December 2019, Marley released his second EP Lord of Lamba which was a mixture of Afrobeats and hip-hop. The EP comprised six tracks and featured guest artists such as CBlvck, Young John and Mayorkun. Its production was handled by Killertunes, Rexxie, and Studio Magic.

During the "Marlian Fest", which was held at the Eko Hotels and Suites on 30 December 2019, Marley announced the launch of his record label Marlian Records and unveiled CBlvck, Zinoleesky, and Fabian Blu as signed acts. On 10 July 2020, Marley unveiled another act under his label, Emo Grae, with a new single and visual titled 0903 featuring Buju.

On 21 June 2021, Marley announced a new album God's Timing Is The Best, to be released after the official video for his song "COMING".

== Controversies ==
=== EFCC arrest ===
On 10 May 2021, the EFCC arrested Marley and his friends Zlatan, Tiamiu Kayode, Adewunmi Adeyanju Moses, Micheal "Taqueesh" Adenuga, and Abubakar Musa. The arrest was made a day after Marley released the video for the controversial single "Am I A Yahoo Boy". Five days later, the EFCC released Zlatan and three others but kept Marley in custody due to the evidence against him. On 16 May 2019, the EFCC charged him with 11 counts of fraud before a federal high court in Ikoyi, Lagos. On 19 May 2019, Zlatan released the single "4 Nights In Ekohtiebo" while Marley was still in prison. In it, he talks about his industry friends, foes, and other people who he admired and how they came through for him. In May 2019, Marley was arraigned and pleaded not guilty; a bail hearing was set for 30 May 2019. On the day of the bail hearing, Marley released "Why", a song that was accompanied by an image of him in handcuffs. On 14 June 2019, he was released from jail 14 days after being granted ₦2,000,000 bail. A few days later, he released "Soapy", a track about the sexual habits of inmates in detention.

In October 2019, Marley returned to court to face the charges. His case was later adjourned to 27 February 2020 after an EFCC witness testified against him.

=== Flouting lockdown order ===
Naira Marley was detained by the Nigerian Police Force for contravening the lockdown order imposed by President Muhammadu Buhari to contain the spread of coronavirus in the country. On 13 June 2020, he performed at a concert in Abuja despite the interstate travel ban and social distancing rules aimed at curbing the spread of COVID-19. He was arraigned by the FCT Administration before a mobile court in Abuja over the concert.

=== Valentine's concert in Cameroon ===
On Saturday 13 February 2021, a report surfaced online that the Marley Valentine's Concert in Cameroon had been canceled by Cameroon government authorities. The concert had already been postponed twice by the organizer and moved to different venues but was later cancelled entirely. According to Nigerian music journalist Joey Akan, the cancellation was due to jealousy on the part of Cameroonian entertainers who are displeased with the traction Nigerian music and musicians have in Cameroon.

=== Assault allegation ===
On 5 October 2022, Marley was accused of assault by his signee MohBad in a series of statements on MohBad's social media. The posts featured pictures and videos of him with noticeable injuries that necessitated hospitalization. Marley responded to the accusation by calling the incident a "family affair", claiming Mohbad was likely "high" when making the complaint.

== Discography ==
=== Albums ===
- God's Timing's the Best (2022)

=== EPs ===
- Gotta Dance (2014)
- Lord of Lamba (2019)

=== Singles ===
| Year | Title | Album | Ref |
|---|---|---|---|
| 2016 | Kosi Werey | —N/a | |
| 2017 | Issa Goal | —N/a | |
| 2018 | Japa | —N/a | |
| 2019 | Am I A Yahoo Boy | —N/a | |
| 2019 | Opotoyi (Marlians) | —N/a | |
| 2019 | Why | —N/a | |
| 2019 | Soapy | —N/a | |
| 2019 | Back2work | —N/a | |
| 2019 | Bad influence | —N/a | |
| 2019 | Mafo | Lord of Lamba | |
| 2019 | Tesumole | Lord of Lamba | |
| 2019 | Isheyen | Lord of Lamba | |
| 2019 | Yanyanyan | Lord of Lamba | |
| 2020 | Aye | —N/a | |
| 2020 | Dido lobo | —N/a | |
| 2020 | Mofoti | —N/a | |
| 2020 | Anywhere | —N/a | |
| 2020 | As E Dey Go | —N/a | |
| 2020 | Idi Oremi (Opotoyi 2) | —N/a | |
| 2020 | Chi Chi | —N/a | |
| 2020 | Koleyewon | —N/a | |
| 2021 | Coming featuring Busiswa) | —N/a | |
| 2021 | Drug Test | —N/a | |
| 2021 | First Time In America | —N/a | |

== Awards and nominations ==
| Year | Award | Category | Recipient | Result | Ref |
|---|---|---|---|---|---|
| 2020 | Soundcity MVP Awards | Viewers' Choice | "Soapy" | Won | |
| 2020 | Soundcity MVP Awards | Song of the Year | "Soapy" | Nominated | |
| 2020 | Soundcity MVP Awards | Best Pop | Himself | Nominated | |
| 2019 | City People Music Awards | Artiste of the Year (Male) | Himself | Nominated | |
| 2019 | City People Music Awards | Street Song of the Year | "Soapy" | Nominated | |
