= 16th Headies Awards =

Nigerian music industry awards

- Date: 3 September 2023
- Location: Cobb Energy Performing Arts Centre, Atlanta, Georgia
- Hosted by: Osas Ighodaro and Terrence J

Highlights
- Most awards: Rema (3), Burna Boy (3)
- Most nominations: Burna Boy (10)
- Website: theheadies.com

Television/radio coverage
- Network: HipTV

The 16th Headies Awards (also known as the 2023 Headies Awards) were held on 3 September 2023, at the Cobb Energy Performing Arts Centre in Atlanta, Georgia. The event was hosted by Osas Ighodaro and Terrence J, and aired live on HipTV. Burna Boy led nominations with ten, followed by Asake with eight. Rema, Omah Lay, Victony, Simi, Kizz Daniel, and Pheelz all received five nominations. Oxlade was nominated four times and Ruger three times. Rema, and Burna Boy won three awards each.

== Background ==
On 1 June 2023, the executive held a stakeholder brunch in Nigeria. On 11 July 2023, the organizers announced the Rookie category of the year, being the first batch of nominees unveiled. On 12 July 2023, the remain categories was released to the public on its website. On 28 July 2023, the United States Consulate Lagos, hosted a reception in honour of the award.

== Performers ==
- Rema
- Asake
- Ayra Starr
- Johnny Drille
- Fireboy DML
- Seyi Vibez
- Wande Coal
- Kcee
- Oxlade
- Victony
- Spyro
- Blaqbonez

== Winners and nominees ==
Below list are nominees and winners. winners are listed first in bold.

Album of the Year	Song of the Year
**Young Preacher** - Blaqbonez; Fly Talk Only - Payper Corleone; Palmwine Music Vol 3 - Show Dem Camp; YPSZN 3 - PsychoYP; Teslìm: The Energy Still Lives in Me - Vector; Billion Dollar Dream - Jeriq	**"Last Last"** - Burna Boy; "Calm Down" - Rema; "Ku Lo Sa" - Oxlade; "Buga" - Kizz Daniel & Tekno; "Finesse" - Pheelz Ft. Bnxn; "Sungba (remix)" - Asake Ft. Burna Boy
Best Recording of the Year	Best Male Artist
"**Soweto**" – Victony; "Alone" - Burna Boy; "Stand Strong" - Davido; "No Woman No Cry" - Tems; "I'm a Mess" - Omah Lay; "Ku Lo Sa - Oxlade	**Rema**; Asake; Kizz Daniel; Ruger; Omah Lay; Burna Boy
Best Female Artist	Best Vocal Performance (Male)
**Ayra Starr**; Tems; Simi; Tiwa Savage	**"Kpe Paso" - Wande Coal**; "Ku Lo Sa" - Oxlade; "My Only Baby" - Ric Hassani; "Love Don't Cost a Dime" - Magixx; "Spell (remix)" - Chike; "Reckless" - Praiz
Best Vocal Performance (Female)	Afrobeats Single of the Year
**"In Between" - Waje**; "Loyal" - Simi; "Memories" - Niniola; "Adua (remix)" - Liya; "Red Wine" - Preye Itams; "Just 4 U" - Dami Oniru	**"Last Last" - Burna Boy**; "Rush" - Ayra Starr; "Buga" - Kizz Daniel (featuring Tekno); "Finesse" - Pheelz (featuring Bnxn); "Who’s Your Guy?" - Spyro; "Asiwaju" - Ruger
Best R&B Single	Best Rap Single
**"For My Hand" – Burna Boy (featuring Ed Sheeran)**; "mmadu" - CKay; "Red Wine" - Preyé; "Loyal" - Simi (featuring Fave); "Just 4 U" - Dami Oniru; "Hard to Find" - Chike	**"Declan Rice" – Odumodublvck**; "Hustle" - Reminisce (featuring D Smoke & Bnxn); "Big Energy" - Ladipoe; "Back in Uni" - Blaqbonez; "Bando Diaries" - PsychoYP (featuring Odumodublvck); "My Bro" - Jeriq (featuring Phyno)
Best Alternative Song	Best Inspirational Single
**"Earth Song" - Wizard Chan**; "Tinko Tinko (Don't Play Me for a Fool)" - Obongjayar; "Final Champion" - Cruel Santino; "The Traveller" - Basketmouth (featuring The Cavemen. & Kwabena Kwabena); "In a Loop" - BOJ (featuring Moliy & Mellissa); "Game Changer (Dike)" - Flavour	**"Eze Ebube" - Neon Adejo**; "Stand Strong" - Davido (featuring Sunday Service Choir); "Jireh (My Provider)" - Limoblaze, Lecrae & Happi Music; "This Year" - Victor Thompson & Ehis D Greatest; "Tobechukwu" - Nathaniel Bassey & Mercy Chinwo; "I Get Backing" – Victoria Orenze
Best Street-Hop Artiste	Best Collaboration
**Seyi Vibez - "Chance (Na Ham)"**; Rexxie, Naira Marley & Skiibii – "Abracadabra"; Asake – "Joha"; Zlatan - "Astalavista"; Poco Lee – "Otilo (Izz Gone)"; MohBad – "Peace	**"Who’s Your Guy (Remix)" - Spyro (featuring Tiwa Savage)**; "Sungba (Remix)" - Asake (featuring Burna Boy); "Gwagwalada" - Bnxn (featuring Kizz Daniel and Seyi Vibez); "Finesse" - Pheelz (featuring Bnxn); "Electricity" - Pheelz (featuring Davido); "Kpe Paso" - Wande Coal (featuring Olamide)
Producer of the Year	Songwriter of the Year
**Magicsticks for "Sungba (Remix)" by Asake (featuring Burna Boy)**; Pheelz for "Electricity" by Pheelz (featuring Davido); Andre Vibez & London for "Calm Down" by Rema; Tempoe for "Soweto" Victony & Tempoe; Kel-P for "Kpe Paso" by Wande Coal (featuring Olamide); Rexxie for "Abracadabra" by Rexxie, Naira Marley & Skiibii	**Simisola Ogunleye-Kosoko, Godsfavour Chidozie, Adekunle Kosoko & Marcel Akunwata for "Loyal" by Simi (featuring Fave)**; Stanley Didia, Adebajo Adebanjo for "I'm a Mess" by Omah Lay; Temilade Openiyi, Ludwig Göransson, Robyn Fenty & Ryan Coogler for "Lift Me Up" by Rihanna; Damini Ogulu, Austin Iwar Jr., Peace Oredope & Ludwig Göransson for "Alone" by Burna Boy; Daniel Benson for "In My Mind" by Bnxn; Fuayefika Maxwell for Earth Song by Wizard Chan
Best Music Video (Note: This particular accolade is awarded to the video director.)	Lyricist on the Roll
**Director K for "Calm Down (Remix)"** by Rema & Selena Gomez; Blaqbonez, Perliks for "Back in Uni" by Blaqbonez; TG Omori for "Peace Be Unto You (PBUY)" by Asake; Director Pink for "Spell (Remix)" Chike & Oxlade; Director K for "Common Person" for Burna Boy; TG Omori for "Bandana" by Fireboy DML & Asake	**Payper Corleone - "Fly Talk Only"**; Ladipoe - "Clowns"; Vector - "Clowns"; Alpha Ojini - "Vigilante Bop"; A-Q - "Family First"; Tec - "Live Life"
Best R&B Album	Best Alternative Album
**The Brother’s Keeper** - Chike; Home - Johnny Drille; Reckless - Praiz; Waje 2.0 - Waje; Matter of Time - Dami Oniru; To Be Honest - Simi	**Gbagada Express** - BOJ; Horoscopes - Basketmouth; Some Nights I Dream Of Doors - Obongjayar; Subaru Boys: Final Heaven - Cruel Santino; Heart Of The Heavenly Undeniable - Somadina; Native World - NATIVE Sound System
Best Rap Album	Next Rated
**Young Preacher** - Blaqbonez; Fly Talk Only - Payper Corleone; Palmwine Music Vol 3 - Show Dem Camp; YPSZN 3 - PsychoYP; Teslìm: The Energy Still Lives in Me - Vector; Billion Dollar Dream - Jeriq	**Asake**; Young Jonn; Seyi Vibez; Victony; Spyro
Rookie of the Year	Headies' Viewer's Choice
**Odumodublvck**; Bloody Civilian; Guchi; Bayanni; Eltee Skhillz; Khaid	**Victony & Tempoe – "Soweto"**; Ruger – "Asiwaju"; Fireboy DML & Asake – "Bandana"; Ayra Starr – "Rush"; Asake – "Terminator"; Mavins – "Overloading"; Crayon – "Ijo (Laba Laba)"; Oxlade – "Ku Lo Sa"; Kizz Daniel & Tekno – "Buga"; Pheelz & Davido – "Electricity"
Digital Artist of the Year	African Artist of the Year
**Rema**; Burna Boy; Ayra Starr; Omah Lay; Kizz Daniel; Asake	**Rema** (Nigeria); Burna Boy (Nigeria); Marwa Loud (Morocco); Black Sherif (Ghana); Diamond Platnumz (Tanzania)
Best West African Artist of the Year	Best East African Artist of the Year
**Black Sherif** (Ghana); Gyakie (Ghana); The Therapist (Sierra Leone); Camidoh (Ghana)	**Diamond Platnumz** (Tanzania); Zuchu (Tanzania); Rayvanny (Tanzania); Eddy Kenzo (Uganda); Hewan Gebrewold (Ethiopia)
Best North African Artist of the Year	Best Southern African Artist of the Year
**ElGrandeToto** (Morocco); Marwa Loud (Morocco); Wegz (Egypt); Soolking (Algeria)	Focalistic (South Africa); AKA (South Africa); Nasty C (South Africa); Costa Titch (South Africa); Uncle Waffles (South Africa); DJ Tarico (Mozambique)
Best Central African Artist of the Year	International Artist of the Year
**Libianca** (Cameroon); Fally Ipupa (Democratic Republic of the Congo); Gaz Mawete (Democratic Republic of the Congo); Matias Damasio (Angola); Emma’a (Gabon)	**Selena Gomez**; Drake; Future; Don Toliver; Ed Sheeran
International Artist Recognition	Hall of Fame
**Sean Combs**	**Youssou N'Dour**
Special Recognition
Sound Sultan
