= Rendezvous (playlist) =

Mixtape by M.I Abaga
- Released: February 9, 2018
- Recorded: 2017
- Genre: Hip hop; trap; R&B; reggaeton
- Length: 52:00
- Label: Chocolate City
- Producer: Jude Abaga; Chillz; CKay; TMXO; Higo; Nonso Amadi; Chopstix; Odunsi the Engine; HVRRY

M.I Abaga chronology
Illegal Music 3 (2016)	Rendezvous (2018)	Yxng Dxnzl (2018)

Singles from Rendezvous
- 1. "Your Father" Released: December 1, 2017; 2. "Lekki" Released: October 2, 2018

Rendezvous (stylized as Rendezvous: The Playlist) is a playlist by Nigerian rapper M.I Abaga. It was released by Chocolate City on February 9, 2018. The playlist features guest appearances from Cassper Nyovest, AKA, Wande Coal, Falz, Yung L, Dice Ailes, CKay, Nonso Amadi, Santi, Odunsi the Engine, Chillz, Tomi Thomas, Joules Da Kid, Ajebutter22, Terry Apala, Strafitti, Trigga Madtonic, Blaqbonez, and UA.x. It also features skits from several radio personalities, including Vic-O, Charles Okocha, Douglas Jekan, Kemi Smallz, and Do2tun. Rendezvous was supported by the singles "Your Father" and "Lekki".

== Background ==
Rendezvous was recorded after Yung Denzel and contains leftover tracks that did not make the latter project. M.I released the playlist after announcing the release date for Yung Denzel. Inspired by Drake's More Life project, its release marked the first of its kind in the Nigerian music industry. Rendezvous was recorded in a haphazard nature. Wande Coal recorded the chorus for "Kososhi" in 2013. M.I began working with musicians Odunsi the Engine and GMK after meeting them in February 2017. In an interview on the Loose Talk podcast, M.I said he scrapped some of the tracks on the playlist after being told by Odunsi the Engine to do so, and had to switch up from doing 4-bar loops to 3-bar loops. Primarily a hip hop playlist, Rendezvous combines elements of trap music with groovy R&B and lyrically driven reggaeton. Rendezvous is not M.I's most personal project, but is considered less playful than his third studio album The Chairman (2014).

== Composition ==
On the playlist's opener "Sunset", M.I throws a subliminal diss at N6, an on-air personality and rapper . In the energetic track "Soup", he and Cassper Nyovest recount their victories against hatred and negativity. "Playlist", a soothing melodic track, is a seductive ode to the rapper's love interest. The song features vocals by Nonso Amadi and is a fusion of jazz and hip-hop. M.I made braggadocios assertions on a number of tracks, including "Kososhi", "One Code" and "Your Father". "One Way" features a comical skit by comedian Charles Okpocha, who lectured listeners about the monetary differences between "the small boys and the big boys". The Ghost-assisted track "Popping" is a reincarnation of "Safe", a song from M.I's debut studio album Talk About It (2008). The reggae-infused track "The Crew" has been described as "groovy". The electropop track "One Time" features vocals by Moelogo. The Dice Ailes-assisted trap song "Your Father" has been described as a "juvenile, belligerent energy that fits its guest more than Mr. Abaga".

== Singles and other releases ==
The Dice Ailes-assisted track "Your Father" was released on December 1, 2017, as the playlist's lead single. The accompanying music video for "Your Father" was directed by The Myth. In a review for Konbini Channels, Daniel Orubo said the "Humble"-inspired video is "nowhere near as cohesive or satisfying". The playlist's second single, "Lekki", was released on October 2, 2018. The song's music video highlights the nightlife scene in Lagos and features cameo appearances from Nedu, Blaqbonez and Zoro.

On August 2, 2019, M.I released the music video for "Playlist". It was directed by Seyi Akinlade and features retro themes, particularly a 1970s-inspired look blended into a modern context.

== Critical reception ==
Professional ratings
Review scores
Source	Rating
BellaNaija	7/10
Pulse Nigeria	4/5 stars
TooXclusive	3.5/5 stars

Rendezvous received generally positive reviews from music critics. Twitter reactions to the playlist were positive. Victor Okpala of Nigerian Entertainment Today described the playlist as a "decent crossroad of musical diversity" and said it "reflects a laudable degree of evolution and flexibility that not so many rappers can boast of". A writer for Pulse Nigeria characterized it as "an extension of his relevance to an age and class of younger musicians and their fans", and opined that all of the acts featured on it won from a musical standpoint.

Jim Donnett gave the playlist 3.5 stars out of 5 in a review for TooXclusive. Donnett stated: "Longtime M.I fans who fell in love with his reflective lyricism on Illegal Music 2 for instance, and his ironically tall posture on MI 2: The Movie, would love this playlist less than his potentially new set of listeners who I expect to appreciate his syncing with their favourite alternative artistes". A writer for BellaNaija, who goes by the moniker Black Boy, said Rendezvous is being celebrated because of the "transient satisfaction it offers, even though its long-term impact remains uncertain". Black Boy also said it "isn't his best project but it has enough quality to rank high on the Nigerian Hip Hop chart of today". Dennis Peter, writing for Filter Free Nigeria, said the playlist is "a better repeat of the same communal tactic integral to The Chairman, with each artist and producer playing to their strengths, while still in service to a project that is Mr. Abaga's most diverse and most sophisticated fabric yet".

== Track listing ==
Digital download / streaming
No.	Title	Writer(s)	Producer(s)	Length
1.	"Sunset" (feat. Chillz)	Jude Abaga; Onome Ojoboh	Chillz; TMXO^{[a]}	3:04
2.	"Soup" (featuring Cassper Nyovest)	Abaga; Refiloe Maele Phoolo	Higo	3:46
3.	"Playlist" (featuring Nonso Amadi)	Abaga; Nonso Amadi	Nonso Amadi; Jude Abaga^{[b]}	3:34
4.	"Jungle" (featuring Tomi Thomas and Santi)	Abaga; Tomi Thomas; Osayaba Andrew Ize-Iyamu	Chopstix; Jude Abaga^{[a]}	3:44
5.	"Whats D Level" (featuring CKay and Joules Da Kid)	Abaga; Chukwuka Ekweani; Kayode Joules Oguntayo	Ckay	3:35
6.	"Kososhi" (featuring Wande Coal)	Abaga; Oluwatobi Wande Ojosipe	TMXO	1:34
7.	"Your Father" (featuring Dice Ailes)	Abaga; Damilola Alesh	Ckay	2:43
8.	"One Way" (featuring Moelogo)	Abaga; Mohammed Animashaun	Jude Abaga; Chopstix^{[a]}	4:04
9.	"On Code" (featuring AKA)	Abaga; Kiernan Jarryd Forbes	Jude Abaga	3:07
10.	"Popping" (featuring Odunsi the Engine and Ghost)	Abaga; Bowofoluwa Odunsi; Olumide Ayeni	Odunsi the Engine	3:43
11.	"Jiggy" (featuring Terry Apala)	Abaga; Terry Alexandar Ejeh	Chillz; TMXO^{[a]}	3:13
12.	"Lekki" (featuring Odunsi the Engine, Falz and Ajebutter22)	Abaga; Odunsi; Folarin Falana; Akitoye Balogun	Odunsi the Engine	4:09
13.	"Slow" (featuring Straffitti and Blaqbonez)	Abaga; Olawale Olukolade; Akumefule Chukwu-Emekaz	HVRRY; Higo^{[a]}	4:11
14.	"The Crew" (featuring Yung L and Ua.X)	Abaga; Chukwuemeka Omenye; Ua.X	Jude Abaga; G Plus^{[a]}; Chopstix^{[a]}	4:29
15.	"Sunrise" (featuring Trigga Madtonic)	Abaga; Trigga Madtonic	Chopstix; Jude Abaga^{[a]}	3:39
Total length:				52:00

Notes

- ^{^[a]} signifies a co-producer
- ^{^[b]} signifies an additional producer

== Personnel ==
Credits were adapted from the album's back cover.

- M.I Abaga – primary artist, production (track 3, 8, 9, 14)
- Cassper Nyovest – featured artist
- Tomi Thomas – featured artist
- Santi – featured artist
- Joules Da Kid – featured artist
- Wande Coal – featured artist
- Dice Ailes – featured artist
- Moelogo – featured artist
- AKA – featured artist
- Ghost – featured artist
- Terry Apala – featured artist
- Falz – featured artist
- Ajebutter22 – featured artist
- Straffitti – featured artist
- Blaqbonez – featured artist
- Yung L – featured artist
- Ua.X – featured artist
- Trigga Madtonic – featured artist
- Chillz – featured artist, production (track 1, 10)
- Nonso Amadi – featured artist, production (track 3)
- Odunsi the Engine – featured artist, production (track 10, 12)
- Ckay – featured artist, production (track 5, 7)
- Chopstix – production (track 4, 8, 14, 15)
- Higo – production (track 2, 13)
- TMXO – production (track 1, 6, 11)
- HVRRY – production (track 13)
- G Plus – production (track 14), mixing and mastering (track 1, 2, 5, 7, 8, 9, 11, 13, 14, 15)
- GMK – mixing and mastering (track 3, 4, 6, 10, 12)
- Dapo Oyewusi – mixing and mastering (track 8)

== Release history ==
Region	Date	Format	Version	Label
Various	February 9, 2018	CD, Digital download	Standard	Chocolate City
