= Alpha Ojini =

Nigerian rapper (born 1992)

- Born: Ebuka Alex Ojini-Ntamere; 1992 (age 33–34)
- Origin: Imo State
- Genres: Alternative Hip-Hop; Afro Jazz-Rap; Afro Grime; Afro-Drill
- Occupations: Rapper, record producer, audio engineer, songwriter
- Years active: 2009–present

Ebuka Alex Ojini-Ntamere, known professionally as Alpha Ojini, is a Nigerian rapper, record producer and songwriter. He is a two-time nominee of The Headies Award and has released eight albums.

== Career ==
Ojini officially started his musical career in 2009 as a student of Madonna University. That same year, he released his first single on campus titled “Don’t Tell Me”. He debuted his first album titled "No Silence" in 2010. The self-produced project comprised 10 tracks. In 2011, he released another 10-track mixtape "The Road to R.U.S.H".

In 2014, Alpha released a 6-track EP "My Own Horns: The JazzRap Project". In 2018, he released "Half Price"; a 12-track album featuring Oxlade and Blaqbonez. In 2019, he released the album “Chvmeleon” featuring other Nigerian artistes like Psycho YP, M.I Abaga and YCee, among others. In 2021, he released the EP “Tears are Salty for a Reason” comprising tracks like “Odeshi” and “Everything”.

Ojini has produced all of his music except "The Artist" and "Odeshi". He was a vocal producer and recording engineer for Oxlade between 2018 and 2020, and has mixing & mastering credits on some of his songs, as well as music from other artists like Timaya, Blaqbonez, YCee, Victony, ShowDemCamp, GoodGirlLA and M.I Abaga.

== Discography ==
=== Artiste Discography ===
==== Albums ====
- No Silence (2010)
- Road to R.U.S.H (2011)
- My Own Horns (2014)
- Half Price (2018)
- Chvmeleon (2019)
- Ten Minutes (2019)
- Tears Are Salty For A Reason (2021)
- The Efeleme Pack (2023)

==== Singles ====
- Don't Tell Me (2009)
- The Artist (2014)
- 12 Days (2019)
- Ocean Boy Remix (2019)
- Madagascar (2019)
- Indaboskee (2020)
- Chorister (2020)
- Pop II (2020)
- Two Horns (2022)
- Vigilante Bop (2022)

=== Production Discography ===
==== Albums ====
- Chidii (fka Fortune Angelo) - “Man In Motion” (2019)
- Phlow - “Marmalade” (2020)

==== Singles ====
- TenTik ft. Victor AD -“Need To Know” (2018)
- Blaqbonez - “Mamiwota” (2018)
- Blaqbonez - “Mamiwota Remix” (2018)
- Cheque - “Abundance” (2019)
- Blaqbonez - “B.R.I.A.” (2019)
- Dremo - “Collect” (2020)
- Blaqbonez - “Shut Up Remix” (2021)
- Payper Corleone ft. Moelogo - “Sunmo Mi” (2022)
- Payper Corleone - “Emiliano” (2023)

== Awards and nominations ==
Year	Award	Category	Result	Ref
2023	The Headies	Lyricist on the Roll	Nominated	
2022	Clout Africa Awards	Best Sound Engineer	Nominated	
2019	The Headies	Best Rap Single	Nominated	
