= Enjoy Your Life (disambiguation) =

Enjoy Your Life is the 2019 debut album by Lady Donli.

Enjoy Your Life may also refer to:

- "Enjoy Your Life", song by the American funk/R&B band Cameo from the 1982 album Alligator Woman
- "Enjoy Your Life", song from the single "Upside Down" by Diana Ross
- "Enjoy Your Life", song by Marina from the 2019 album Love + Fear
- "Enjoy Your Life", song by Romy from the 2023 album Mid Air
- Enjoy Your Life!, 2016 photo exhibitions by Juergen Teller
