= Emeka Must Shine =

2023 Studio album by Blaqbonez

Studio album by Blaqbonez
- Released: October 27, 2023
- Recorded: 2023
- Genre: Afrobeats; hip hop; drill; R&B; alté; dancehall
- Length: 36:28
- Label: Chocolate City
- Producer: Projexx; Masterkraft; Ramoni; North Boi

Blaqbonez chronology
Young Preacher (2022)	Emeka Must Shine (2023)

Singles from Emeka Must Shine
- 1. "Like Ice Spice" Released: July 7, 2023; 2. "Bezos" Released: July 7, 2023; 3. "Cinderella Girl (Where You Dey)" Released: May 12, 2023

Emeka Must Shine is the third studio album by Blaqbonez. It charted on more than 20 nations' official album charts.

== Background ==
Emeka Must Shine is made up of 14 tracks and was released on 27 October 2023, under Chocolate City Music. The album is the follow up album of Young Preacher album. The album includes guest appearances from indigenous artists such as Black Sherif, Jeriq, Victony, Odumodublvck, M24, Zlatan, Young Jonn and Ludacris. It also features producers such as Projexx, Masterkraft, Ramoni, and North Boi. The album is a blend of Afrobeats, hip hop, drill, R&B, and alté music. A song in the album "No Sleep $$$" featuring Young Jonn peaked on the U.S. Billboard Afrobeat songs chart.

== Critical reception ==
Professional ratings
Review scores
Source	Rating
Pulse Nigeria	7.5/10

Adeayo Adebiyi, a music reporter for Pulse Nigeria stated that "'Emeka Must Shine' shows Blaqbonez's impressive range, but it doesn't offer the best version of either side of him. While the project might not make for a compelling listen, it makes for an enjoyable one, and this, we can say, is the purpose of a Pop leaning album."

== Track listing ==
Emeka Must Shine track listing
No.	Title	Writer(s)	Length
1.	"Road Runners" (featuring Black Sherif)	Emeka Akumefule, Mohammed Sherif	2:26
2.	"6 Business Days" (featuring Projexx)	Emeka Akumefule	2:39
3.	"Kilo"	Emeka Akumefule	2:24
4.	"Like Ice Spice"	Emeka Akumefule	2:03
5.	"Nyem Ego" (featuring Jeriq)	Emeka Akumefule	2:35
6.	"Naija Shawty" (featuring Victony)	Emeka Akumefule, Anthony Victor	1:48
7.	"Dollerz" (featuring Odumodublvck)	Emeka Akumefule, Tochukwu Ojohwu	2:54
8.	"Masquerade" (featuring M24)	Emeka Akumefule; M24	2:47
9.	"Shine Forever"	Emeka Akumefule	1:43
10.	"Bad Till Eternity" (featuring Zlatan)	Emeka Akumefule, Raphael Omoniyi	2:53
11.	"No Sleep $$$" (featuring Young Jonn)	Emeka Akumefule, John Udomboso	3:07
12.	"Bezos"	Emeka Akumefule	2:42
13.	"Wait Let Me Get the Issue"	Emeka Akumefule	2:47
14.	"Cinderella Girl (Where You Dey)" (featuring Ludacris)	Emeka Akumefule, Christopher Bridges	3:35

== Charts ==
Weekly chart performance for Emeka Must Shine
Chart (2023)	Peak position
Nigeria Albums (TurnTable)	7
