= Somadina (given name) =

- Gender: Male
- Language: Igbo

Origin
- Origin: Nigeria
- Meaning: May I not exist in isolation.
- Region of origin: South-east Nigeria

Other names
- Short form: Soma

Somadina audio is a masculine name of the Igbo people from south-eastern Nigeria. The name means "May I not exist in isolation".

== Notable individuals with the name ==
- Somadina (born 2000), Nigerian singer and songwriter
- Somadina Adinma (born 1999), Nigerian actor and model
