= Young Preacher =

Studio album by Blaqbonez
- Released: October 28, 2022
- Recorded: 2022
- Genre: Afrobeats; Hip-hop; R&B; Rap; Afro-fusion
- Length: 36:01
- Label: Chocolate City
- Producer: Jae5; Blaisebeatz; Tay Iwar; Masterkraft; Telz; Ramoni; Ozedikus; Chopstix

Blaqbonez chronology
Sex Over Love (2021)	Young Preacher (2022)

Singles from Young Preacher
- 1. "Back In Uni" Released: October 7, 2022; 2. "Fashionnova" Released: October 28, 2022; 3. "Hot Boy" Released: October 28, 2022

Young Preacher is the second studio album by Nigerian rapper Blaqbonez. The album was awarded Best Rap Album at the 2023 edition of the Headies.

== Background ==
On October 28, 2022, Blaqbonez released his 14-track sophomore studio album, Young Preacher through Chocolate City music. Young Preacher is the follow up album of Sex Over Love extended play. The album included guest appearances from Nigerian indigenous artists such as Amaarae, Lojay, Blxckie, Cheque, Tekno, Bien and Takura. It also features producers such as Tay Iwar, Jae5, Blaisebeatz, Masterkraft, Telz, Ramoni and Ozedikus. The album is a mixture of hip-hop, Afrobeats and R&B. Young Preacher was among the list of the most streamed albums in Nigeria which climbed to the number 1 spot on Apple Music charts and won the Best Rap album in The Headies awards 2023. In 2022, Barcelona star, Jules Kounde hailed Blaqbonez stating that his Young Preacher album is on repeat. Young Preacher album appeared on Rolling Stone's top 40 Afro-pop songs of 2022.

== Promotion ==
Blaqbonez hosted an anti-love crusade titled Breaking The Yoke of Love to support Young Preacher on 14 February 2022.

== Track listing ==
Young Preacher track listing
No.	Title	Writer(s)	Producer(s)	Length
1.	"Young Preacher"	Emeka Akumefule; Shifi Emoefe; Tunde Akinsanmi; Zeal Onyecheme	Ramoni	2:22
2.	"Hot Boy"	Akumefule; Osagie Onobun	Telz; Ramoni	3:03
3.	"Fashionnova"	Akumefule; Abraham Obot	Jae5; Ramoni	2:00
4.	"Back in Uni" (featuring Jae5)	Akumefule; Obot; Onobun	Jae5	2:30
5.	"Whistle" (featuring Lojay and Amaarae)	Akumefule; Emoefe; Akinsanmi; Onyecheme	Ramoni; Chopstix; Masterkraft	3:06
6.	"Loyalty"	Akumefule; Obot; Onobun	Ramoni	2:28
7.	"She Like Igbo" (interlude)	Akumefule	Ozedikus	1:18
8.	"Fake Nikes" (featuring Blxckie and Cheque)	Akumefule; Sihle Sithole; Akanbi Brett	Ramoni	3:04
9.	"Ring Ring" (featuring Tay Iwar)	Akumefule; Austin Iwar	Joffstar; Ramoni	3:10
10.	"Ess Mama" (featuring Tekno)	Akumefule; Augustine Kelechi	Blaisebeatz	2:48
11.	"Mazoe" (featuring Takura and Bien)	Akumefule; Takura Tendayi; Bien-Aimé Baraza	Gangstamadeit	3:44
12.	"Star Life"	Akumefule; Brett; Emana Saintly	BMH	3:00
13.	"Back on BS"	Akumefule	Ramoni; 10Ten	2:51
14.	"I'll Be Waiting"	Akumefule; Bukola Elemide	Joffstar; Ramoni; 10Ten	4:00
Total length:				36:19

== Critical reception ==
Professional ratings
Review scores
Source	Rating
Pulse Nigeria	8.9/10
The Native	7.3/10

Adeayo Adebiyi, a music reporter for Pulse Nigeria stated that “Young Preacher is an A&R masterclass as every featured artist is not only a musical fit, but they are also strategic. Tekno has a sizeable followership across the continent and beyond that includes Drake and Billie Elish. Lojay and Amarae appeal to the Gen Z listeners that roam Pop and Alte soundscapes. JAE5 touch on 'Back In Uni' and 'Fashionova' taps into the UK scene, Blxckie is one of the fast-rising rappers in South Africa, and Bien of Sauti Sol is one of the most recognizable voices in Eastern Africa”.

The Native Magazine noted that “Young Preacher is unarguably the most cohesive of his projects yet, embodying a pristine musicianship which doesn’t underplay his skills as a rapper as much as it highlights them. Just as JAY-Z reckons he could sell water to a whale, on this album Blaqbonez could sell his preachings of no love to an unbeliever. He’s very convincing, and it does help that the music is great as well. It’s remarkable how far he’s come—here are thirteen songs which fittingly captures where Blaqbonez is right now, in 2022. It’s an enticing prospect to ponder on what subsequent years would sound like”.

== Release history ==
Region	Date	Format	Version	Label	Ref
Various	October 28, 2022	CD; digital download	Standard	Chocolate City	
