= No gree for anybody =

Nigerian slang

No Gree for Anybody is a Nigerian slang term which gained widespread currency in 2024 particularly among young Nigerians.

== Etymology ==
The phrase comes from Nigerian pidgin.

== Popularity ==
The Nigeria Police Force raised called the slogan a word for triggering chaos in Nigeria. According to Leadership news, Olumuyiwa Adejobi the public relation officer addressed that the slogan is aimed at triggering a revolution in the country.

"Let me say it again that the new slogan for 2024, 'No gree for anybody', we have been informed by intelligence that this slogan is coming from a revolutionary sector that may likely cause problems across the country." - Olumuyiwa Adejobi.

== In popular culture ==
The term "No Gree for Anybody!" found its way into Nigerian movies as Spyro sang a song titled "No Gree for Anybody." Also in 2024, Josh2Funny released a song with the same name.
