= Anthony Azekwoh =

Nigerian digital artist, author, and entrepreneur

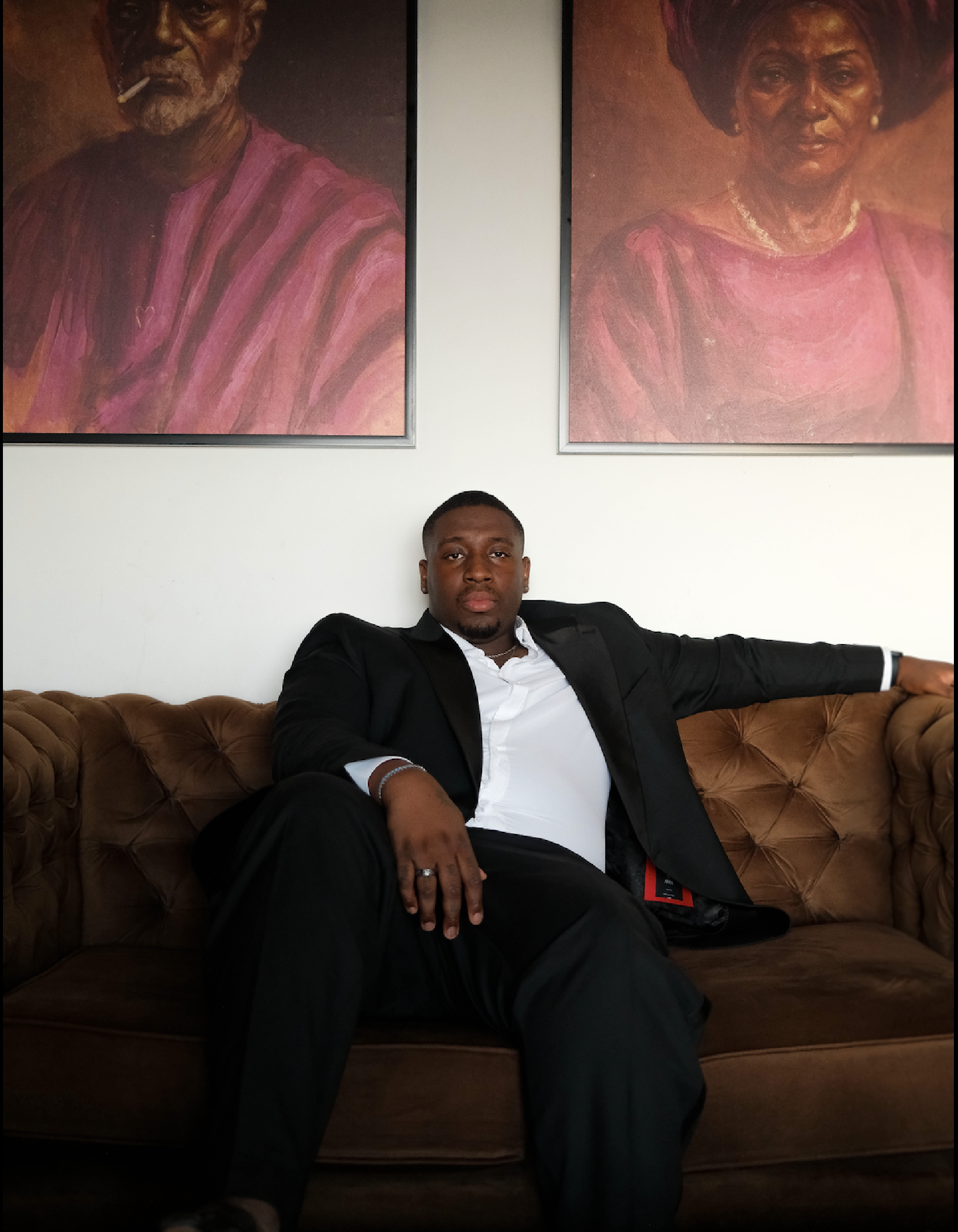
- Azekwoh at his exhibition "The Wedding" in Lagos, 2025
- Born: May 17, 2000 (age 26); Lagos, Nigeria
- Education: Covenant University (dropped out)
- Known for: Digital art, The Red Man, Afrofuturist themes
- Notable work: The Red Man (2020), No Victor No Vanquished
- Awards: Awele Trust Prize (2017), Loose Convo Grant (2018)

Anthony Azekwoh (born May 17, 2000) is a Nigerian contemporary digital artist, author, and entrepreneur based in Lagos, Nigeria. His work intertwines digital art with African folklore, mythology, and Afrofuturist themes, primarily exploring Yoruba cosmology and Nigerian cultural narratives. He has been described as "one of the most visible digital artists on the continent" and is known for his viral 2020 artwork The Red Man, which sold for $25,000 as an NFT.

Azekwoh has collaborated with international brands including Meta and Psyonix (Rocket League), and created artwork for musicians such as Adekunle Gold, Masego, Blaqbonez, Show Dem Camp, and Simi. His works have been collected by celebrities including Cynthia Erivo, Jae5, and Lojay.

== Early life and education ==
Anthony Azekwoh was born in 2000 in Lagos, Nigeria. He attended Whitesands School, Lagos, where he began creative writing as a high school student. There he met Nigerian writer and linguist Kola Tubosun, his English teacher, who became his mentor. During this period, he encountered the works of writers such as Nnedi Okorafor, Lesley Nneka Arimah, and Neil Gaiman, who influenced his storytelling approach.

Azekwoh later enrolled at Covenant University to study Chemical engineering but dropped out in 2019 to pursue a full-time career in art. He is entirely self-taught as a visual artist, having learned digital painting through Photoshop while studying the techniques of neoclassical painters including Jacques-Louis David and Norman Rockwell.

== Career ==
=== Writing ===
Azekwoh began writing at age 13 and has since authored five books and hundreds of short stories and essays. His published works include Star (2020), The Day the Devil Came To Nigeria, and Sango Oya. He has also written a series titled The Fall of the Gods published on Brittle Paper, and is developing a comic series called The Witches of Auchi.

In 2017, Azekwoh won the Awele Trust Prize for his short story "The Fall of the Gods."

=== Visual art ===
Azekwoh began digital painting in 2016, initially drawing with ink pens on A4 paper after his laptop broke, forcing him to explore new creative outlets. He started posting his work online and receiving commissions from international clients by 2016–2017.

==== The Red Man and NFT breakthrough ====
In June 2020, Azekwoh created The Red Man, a digital portrait that became his breakthrough work. Initially painted as a personal experiment without commercial intent, the artwork went viral upon posting, accumulating over 220,000 likes on social media. The painting depicts a figure shrouded in red hues with a stoic gaze, which Azekwoh described as feeling "fully mine: bold, raw, and different."

The Red Man was subsequently sold on SuperRare as an NFT for $25,000, bringing Azekwoh international recognition. Within months of entering the NFT space, he generated over $80,000 in sales, eventually grossing more than $200,000 total. In 2021, he sold out collections on platforms including Charged Particles, SuperRare, and Nifty Gateway.

=== Commercial work and collaborations ===
Azekwoh has designed album and single artwork for Nigerian and international musicians including Adekunle Gold, Blaqbonez, Show Dem Camp, Masego, Simi, Jae5, and Young Jonn.

His commercial clients include Meta, for whom his artwork was featured in an NFT gallery as part of the #FlexNaija mixed reality initiative in Nigeria in 2022, and Psyonix, for whom he produced cinematic key art for Rocket League.

He has also worked with fashion and lifestyle brands including Severe Nature and Chocolate City on streetwear capsules and art direction.

== Exhibitions ==
=== Solo exhibitions ===
- 2025: "The Wedding" – Lagos, Nigeria. Held December 13–19, 2025, at Lekki Phase 1. His largest exhibition to date, featuring portraits, sculptures, and a central dinner scene exploring themes of love, family, and grief. The collection began with The Bridesmaid, which garnered over 10 million views on social media.
- 2023: "There Is a Country" – Toured Lagos, Abuja, London, and New York. The exhibition explored Nigeria's history and trauma through portraiture and layered symbolism.
- 2022: "Becoming" – Abuja, Nigeria. A month-long exhibition at the Discovery Museum in the Art-Tech District.
- 2021: "Homecoming" – Lagos, Nigeria. His first solo exhibition, featuring 36 digital artworks. Described as Nigeria's biggest solo exhibition by a digital artist at the time.
- 2021: "Red" – Lagos, Nigeria

=== Group exhibitions ===
- 2023: "How High The Moon" – New York, USA
- 2023: "Unfolding States" – Group exhibition featuring contemporary African artists
- 2022: FiServ Black History Month Showcase
- 2022: Superchief Tokyo Billboard Feature
- 2021: ETH Showcase – Denver, Colorado
- Art X Lagos

=== Curatorial projects ===
- 2022–2023: Afrodigital (Volumes I, II, and III) – SuperRare
- 2022: Liveart Showcase – Lagos, Nigeria
- 2022: Coinprofile Showcase – Lagos, Nigeria

== Institutional recognition ==
Azekwoh's painting No Victor No Vanquished became the first digital artwork acquired by the Yemisi Shyllon Museum of Art in Nigeria.

== Philanthropy ==
Following his success with NFTs, Azekwoh established the Anthony Azekwoh Fund (also known as the Rosemary Fund), pledging 10% of his sales to support emerging artists in Nigeria. Inspired by his own early struggles and the lack of institutional support for young artists, the fund provides grants to help nurture the next generation of Nigerian creatives.

In late 2021, he also initiated an alumni art prize at Whitesands School, his former secondary school, to reward exemplary students in the arts.

== Awards and recognition ==
- 2017: Awele Trust Prize (for the short story "The Fall of the Gods")
- 2018: Loose Convo Grant
