= Lady Donli =

Nigerian singer

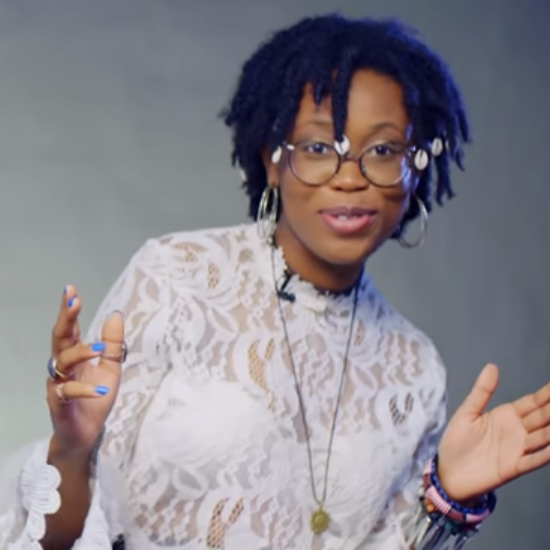
- Born: Zainab Donli; Cleveland, Ohio
- Education: University of Surrey
- Occupation: Singer
- Known for: Alternative rock, alternative R&B and Afrobeat
- Website: ladydonli.com

Zainab Elizabeth Donli, known professionally as Lady Donli, is a Nigerian singer and songwriter associated with Alté music. Her music incorporates elements of alternative R&B, hip hop, jazz, and Afrobeats.

== Biography ==
Donli was born in Cleveland, Ohio, and is the youngest of six children. She spent her early years in Abuja and Kaduna, where her father is from. After her secondary school education, she moved to the United Kingdom, where she obtained a degree in law from the University of Surrey. Donli's earliest musical influence came from the Evangelical Church of West Africa and its style of synchronous praise-chanting. She was also influenced by the music of Brenda Fassie, Angelique Kidjo, Aṣa, and Erykah Badu, as well as Nigeria's pop musicians.

Donli is associated with Nigeria's Alté music, a fusion genre that combines elements of several genres, including Afrobeat, R&B, and soul. She released her debut 12-track mixtape, Love or War, in 2014. Donli has worked with artists such as Adekunle Gold, Nonso Amadi, Tomi Thomas, M.I Abaga, Mr Eazi, SDC, Davido, Ayüü, Odunsi the Engine, and Tay Iwar, among others.

In 2018, Donli lent vocals to Boogey's "Motion" and Terry Tha Rapman's "Open Letter". That same year, she collaborated with Mr Eazi on "Lagos Gyration", which appeared on his second mixtape Lagos to London (2018). She was also featured on "+-", a track from M.I Abaga's fourth studio album A Study on Self Worth: Yxng Dxnzl.

Donli released her debut album, Enjoy Your Life, in 2019.

== Discography ==
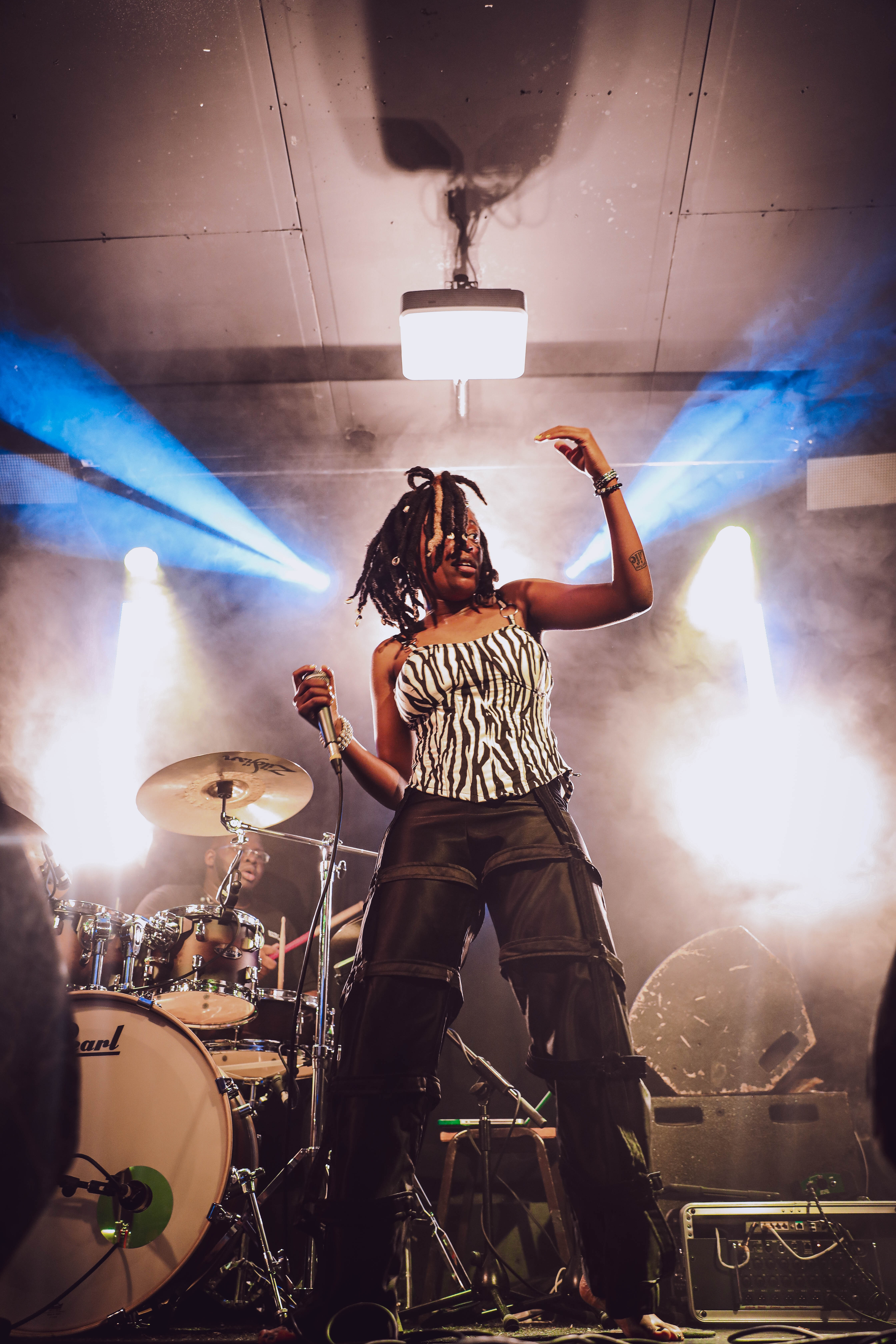
Lady Donli at the Enjoy Your Life Concert in 2020

Studio albums

- Enjoy Your Life (2019)
- Pan African Rockstar (2023)

EPs

- Love or War (2014)
- Wallflower (2016)
- Letters to Her (2018)
- Wild (2021)

=== Selected singles ===
Year	Title	Non-album single
2014	"Mr Creeper"	Non-album single
2016	"Kashe Ni"	Non-album single
2016	"Ice Cream" (featuring Tomi Thomas)	Non-album single
2017	"Poison"	Non-album single
2018	"Games"	Non-album single
2018	"Classic"	Non-album single
2018	"Comforter"	Non-album single
2018	"Work" (featuring Tomi Thomas and The Forbidden)	Non-album single
2019	"Cash" (Remix) (featuring Davido)	Non-album single
2020	"Wonda Wonda" (featuring Darkovibes)	Non-album single
2022	"Thunderstorm in Surulere" (featuring The Lagos Panic)	

=== Major features ===
Artist	Track	Album	Year
Terry Tha Rapman	"Open Letter"	The Life of Joe Spazm	2018
Boogey	"Motions"	Nouveau Niveau	2018
M.I Abaga	"+-"	A Study on Self Worth: Yxng Dxnzl	2018
Show Dem Camp	"For A Minute"	Palmwine Music 2	2018
Mr Eazi	"Lagos Gyration"	Life is Eazi Vol 2: Lagos to London	2018
DRB LasGidi	"Ma Pariwo"	Pioneers	2020

== Awards and nominations ==
Year	Event	Prize	Recipient	Result	Ref
2021	The Headies	Best Alternative Song	"Corner"	Nominated	
2020	The Future Awards Africa	Music (Endowed by Infinix)	Herself	Nominated	
2019	The Headies	Best Alternative Song	"Cash"	Nominated	
2018	Nigeria Entertainment Awards	Best New Act of the Year	Herself	Nominated	
2018	Nigerian Teens Choice Awards	Choice Female Artist	Herself	Nominated	
2015	Nigerian Teens Choice Awards	Choice Mixtape/EP	Love or War	Nominated	
2015	Nigerian Teens Choice Awards	Choice Female Artist	Herself	Nominated	
