= A Study on Self Worth: Yxng Dxnzl =

2018 studio album by Nigerian rapper MI Abaga

Studio album by M.I Abaga
- Released: August 24, 2018
- Genre: Hip-hop
- Length: 39:54
- Label: Chocolate City
- Producers: Jude Abaga; Tay Iwar; GMK; G Clef; Chillz; Major Bangz; Chopstix; PatricKxxLee

M.I Abaga chronology
Rendezvous (2018)	A Study on Self Worth: Yxng Dxnzl (2018)	Judah (2020)

Singles from A Study on Self Worth: Yxng Dxnzl
- 1. "You Rappers Should Fix Up Your Lives" Released: October 20, 2017

A Study on Self Worth: Yxng Denzel (commonly shortened to Yxng Denzel or Yung Denzel) is the fourth studio album by Nigerian rapper M.I Abaga. It was released on August 24, 2018, by Chocolate City. The album features guest appearances from Tay Iwar, Cina Soul, Lorraine Chia, Odunsi the Engine, Lady Donli, Niyola and PatricKxxLee. Its production was handled by M.I, Tay Iwar, Chopstix, Major Bangz, TMXO, Doz, G Clef, Chillz, GMK and PatricKxxLee. Yung Denzel explores themes of self-introspection, self-doubt and reassurance; it also addresses topics such as depression, mental health, disloyalty and cultural repression. The album received positive reviews from music critics and was nominated for Best Rap Album at The Headies 2019.

== Background and promotion ==
M.I Abaga recorded Yung Denzel before Rendezvous and announced plans for its release in May 2018. During that time, he executively produced a few albums and announced the WAHA hip-hop festival. The album's release date was postponed because all of the samples used had not been cleared. M.I derived the album's title from a badly received joke he made about having a physical resemblance to actor Denzel Washington. Yung Denzel explores themes of self-introspection, self-doubt and reassurance. It contains skits and interludes from sample interviews conducted by other people. M.I employs a journal-style approach for the album, giving all the songs on it lengthy names. He also disguises his voice and ends every song with snippets from his therapy session.

The album's lead single, "You Rappers Should Fix Up Your Lives", was released on October 20, 2017. The song's release triggered an online debate about the current state and decline of Nigerian hip-hop. Several Nigerian rappers responded to M.I, including N6, Payper, Blaqbonez and Vader. M.I won Best Rap Single and Lyricist on the Roll for "You Rappers Should Fix Up Your Lives" at The Headies 2018.

== Composition ==
On the album's opening track "Do You Know Who You Are? Take Some Time and Meditate on You", M.I talks about the importance of self-worth. In "Stop! Never Second Guess Yourself", he displays aggression and cynicism; the song's lyrics cheers a woman and speaks to the person in the mirror. In the bass-infused track "I Believe in You, You should too, Believe in You", M.I considers himself to be the best rapper regardless of whether or not he's applauded. In "Another Thing! Do Not Be a Groupie", he brags about all of his accomplishments and criticizes rappers who do not work on their craft. In "You Rappers Should Fix Up Your Lives", he expresses his feelings about the current state of Nigerian hip-hop.

In the romantic track "You Are Like Melody, My Heart Skips a Beat", M.I expresses relatable sentiments and confesses to learning every day. On the album's title track, he opens up about his demons and battle with depression. In "Last Night I Had a Dream About a Hummingbird", M.I speaks about the hummingbird, a metaphor for people who are caged and held back by boundaries of their own making. On the album's closer "Love Never Fails, But There Are Prophecies Love Will Cease to Remain", Tay Iwar and M.I paint a riveting image of the reality that mental health patients endure.

== Critical reception ==
A Study on Self Worth: Yxng Dxnzl received positive reviews from music critics. Twitter reactions to the playlist were also positive. Pulse Nigeria's Ehis Ohunyon awarded the album 4 stars out of 5, characterizing it as a "watertight project that is well conceived, thoroughly executed and perfectly served to cater for both his young and old fans". A writer for Nigerian Entertainment Today, who goes by the moniker Smish, described the album as a body of work "you turn to on gloomy days, searching frantically through its cornucopia of sounds, lyrics and cuts, hoping to find yourself". Debola Abimbolu considers the album to be M.I's "most thoughtful LP till date" and acknowledged him for "tying the mental-health awareness anthem with his personal journey and insecurities". Ernst Motsa of New Frame said A Study on Self Worth: Yxng Dxnzl "speaks to the various factors that contribute to the rapper’s depression—our dark history of dealing with oppression, celebrity in the era of social media and the self-doubt that comes with it".

=== Accolades ===
Year	Awards ceremony	Award description(s)	Results
2019	The Headies	Best Rap Album	Nominated

== Track listing ==
No.	Title	Writer(s)	Producer(s)	Length
1.	"Do You Know Who You Are? Take Some Time and Meditate on You" (featuring Tay Iwar)	Jude Abaga; Tay Iwar	Tay Iwar	4:54
2.	"Last Night I Had a Dream About a Hummingbird"	Abaga	Chopstix; G Clef	2:24
3.	"You Rappers Should Fix Up Your Lives"	Abaga	PatricKxxLee; M.I Abaga	4:30
4.	"Another Thing! Do Not Be a Groupie"	Abaga	Major Bangz; M.I Abaga	4:02
5.	"Stop! Never Second Guess Yourself" (featuring Cina Soul)	Abaga; Christie Quarcoopome	Doz	3:33
6.	"You are Like Melody, My Heart Skips a Beat" (featuring Lorrine Chia)	Abaga; Lorrine Chia	Chillz; G Clef; M.I Abaga	3:23
7.	"+-" (featuring Odunsi the Engine and Lady Donli)	Abaga; Odunsi; Lady Donli	Doz	5:06
8.	"I Believe in You, You should too, Believe in You"	Abaga	GMK	2:52
9.	"The Self Evaluation of Yxng Dxnzl" (featuring Niyola)	Abaga; Niyola	TMXO; G Clef	4:17
10.	"Love Never Fails But Where there are Prophecies Love Will Cease to Remain" (featuring Tay Iwar and PatrickxxxLee)	Abaga; Tay Iwar	Tay Iwar	3:59
Total length:				39:54

== Release history ==
Region	Date	Format	Version	Label
Various	August 24, 2018	CD, digital download	Standard	Chocolate City
