= Victoria Orenze =

Nigerian gospel artiste

- Born: Victoria Orenze; 23 March 1984 (age 42); Jos, Northern Nigeria
- Origin: Unknown, Nigeria
- Occupation: Singer · Songwriter · Worship leader
- Years active: 2015–present
- Label: Independent / Self‑released

Victoria Orenze (born 23 March 1984) is a Nigerian gospel singer, songwriter, and worship leader known for her soulful worship style and spiritually‑charged songs. She gained widespread recognition after her collaboration with gospel artist Nathaniel Bassey on the song “Alagbada Ina.”

== Career ==
Victoria came to the limelight after featuring in 'Alagbada Ina' by Nathaniel Bassey in 2017. The duo have gone on to release several songs together like Ebenezer and Let Your Fire Fall.

== Discography ==
- Covenant Keeping God
- Draw
- Spirit Chant
- 2022 – See How Far featuring Nathaniel Bassey, Dunsin Oyekan
- 2023 – I Get Backing
- 2024 – My Master, My Lord
- 2024 – Faith Anthem
- 2024 – Secret Place
- 2025 – Too Oiled

== Albums ==
2016- Return Rev. 2:4

2022- Truth in Sounds

2023 - Gratitude- (Reflections)

2026- Just Believe

== Awards ==
Year/Award	Work	Category	Result	Ref
The Headies 2023	I Get Backing	Best Inspirational Single	Nominated	
Galaxy Music Awards 2023		Gospel Artiste of the Year	Nominated	
