= Sex Over Love =

Studio album by Blaqbonez
- Released: 30 April 2021
- Genre: Hip Hop, Afrobeats
- Length: 40:00
- Label: Chocolate City
- Producer: BeatsbyJayy; Type A; Blaisebeatz; Xquisite Beats; Tuzi; Spax

Blaqbonez chronology
Bad Boy Blaq (2018)	Sex Over Love (2021)

Singles from Sex Over Love
- 1. "Bling" Released: 21 June 2019; 2. "BBC (Remix)" Released: 2 July 2019; 3. "Haba" Released: 26 July 2019

Sex Over Love is the first studio album by Nigerian rapper Blaqbonez. It was released on 30 April 2021 by Chocolate City. The album features guest appearances from Joeboy, Nasty C, Bad Boy Timz, 1Da Banton, Tiwa Savage, Superboy Cheque, Mayorkun, Amaarae, Buju, PsychoYP, A-Q and Laycon.

== Background ==
On 26 April 2021, the album's release date was announced. On 2 May, Blaqbonez was featured in an interview on Channels Television and The Guardian which he talked about the album.

== Artwork ==
The artwork is a toon-paint like art of him wearing a purple tuxedo sitting on a date with no date holding flowers, made by Nigerian artist Anthony Azekwoh.

== Promotion ==
The album's third track, "Bling" featuring Amaarae and Buju, was released on 9 April 2021. The music video for the song was released on 23 April 2021.

The ninth track, "BBC (Remix)" featuring Tiwa Savage, was released on 10 February 2021. The music video for the song was released on the same day.

The bonus single "Haba" was released on 10 March 2020 along with the video.

=== Promotional track ===
"Bling" was released as a promotional single on 9 April 2021.

== Track listing ==
Sex Over Love track listing
No.	Title	Producer(s)	Length
1.	"Novacane"	Xquisite Beats	3:06
2.	"Heartbreaker" (featuring Nasty C)	BeatsbyJayy	2:35
3.	"Bling" (featuring Amaarae and Buju)	Type A	3:50
4.	"Never Been in Love"	Blaisebeatz	2:25
5.	"Don't Touch"	Blaise Beats	3:28
6.	"TGF Pussy"	BeatsbyJayy	1:56
7.	"Okwaraji"	BeatsbyJayy	2:45
8.	"Fendi" (featuring Joeboy)	Type A	3:05
9.	"BBC Remix" (featuring Tiwa Savage)	Spax	3:02
10.	"Faaji" (featuring Bad Boy Timz and 1Da Banton)	Tuzi	2:51
11.	"Zombie" (featuring Laycon, Psycho YP and A-Q)	BeatsbyJayy	3:08
12.	"Best Friend" (featuring Superboy Cheque)	BeatsbyJayy	3:24
13.	"Cynic Route"	Xquisite Beats	1:32
14.	"Haba"	Type A	3:18
Total length:			40:00
