= 1da Banton =

Nigerian singer-songwriter and producer (born 1994)

- Born: Godson Ominibie Epelle; 27 June 1994 (age 32); Port Harcourt, Rivers State, Nigeria
- Genres: Afro-fusion; Afrobeats
- Occupations: Singer; songwriter; Record producer
- Years active: 2015–present
- Label: Squareball Entertainment

Godson Ominibie Epelle, professionally known as 1da Banton, (born 27 June 1994) is a Nigerian singer, songwriter and record producer who is best known for his 2021 song "No Wahala", which was remixed and re-released in 2022, featuring Nigerian musicians Kizz Daniel and Tiwa Savage.

== Background and career ==
1da Banton was born and raised in Port Harcourt, Rivers State, Nigeria. He studied civil engineering, but dropped out to pursue a career in music. In 2014, he relocated to Lagos after being signed by Squareball Entertainment.

1da Banton started producing music following the death of his mother in 2008. In July 2017, he released his debut extended play (EP) titled The Banton EP. One of the EP's songs, "Way Up", was used as the theme song for the third season of Big Brother Naija. He gained global recognition after the release of "No Wahala", which was one of the tracks on his album Original Vibe Machine, released in 2021. The US Secretary of State Antony Blinken listed the song among his 2021 Spotify playlist favorite songs of the year.

In 2022, 1da Banton released a remix of "No Wahala" which featured Kizz Daniel and Tiwa Savage. He has also collaborated with Jamaican singer Kranium, Ghanaian dancehall musician Stonebwoy, and Nigerian artists Zlatan, Seyi Shay and Blaqbonez.

In 2023, "No Wahala" was featured on the third season of the American comedy drama series Ted Lasso.

On 10 April 2023, "No Wahala" surpassed 100 million streams on Spotify, making it one of the most streamed Afrobeat songs on the platform.

In 2024, Banton recorded "Holy Man" and "Evidence" with Bella Shmurda, Holy Man on YouTube and Evidence on YouTube and "Best Life" with Desiigner Best Life on YouTube.

== Discography ==
Studio albums

- Original Vibe Machine (2021)

Extended plays

- The Banton EP (2017)
- 1da Shall Never End (2023)

Singles

- "Love Her Daily" (2016)
- "Farabale" (2019)
- "Whine fi Mi" (featuring Kranium) (2019)
- "Foreigner" (2020)
- "African Woman" (2020)
- "Same Girl" (2020)
- "Shenor" (2020)
- "No Wahala" (2021)
- "No Wahala" (remix) (featuring Kizz Daniel and Tiwa Savage) (2022)
- "Summer Love" (2022)
- "Holy Man" (2024)
- "Evidence" (2024)
- "Best Life" (2024)

As featured artist

- "Faaji" – Blaqbonez featuring Bad Boy Timz and 1Da Banton (Sex Over Love, 2021)

== Awards and nominations ==
Year	Event	Prize	Recipient	Result	Ref(s)
2021	The Beatz Awards 2021	Best song of the year	"Blaisebeatz (No Wahala)" ^{[A]}	Won	
2023	Soundcity MVP Awards Festival	Digital Artiste of the Year	Self	Nominated	

== Selected production credits ==
"Barrawo" by Ajebo hustlers

"Barrawo" (remix) by Ajebo hustlers featuring Davido
