= Enjoy Your Life =

Studio album by Lady Donli
- Released: 9 August 2019
- Genre: Afrobeats; Afro-soul; Alté
- Length: 37:08
- Producer: Lady Donli & The Cavemen. (exec.); DOZ; GMK; Tay Iwar; 9TyMasta; Tomi Thomas; Efe Jazz; Jms

Lady Donli chronology
Letters to Her (2017)	Enjoy Your Life (2019)	W I L D (2021)

Singles from Enjoy Your Life
- 1. "Cash" Released: 5 April 2019; 2. "Suffer Suffer" Released: 12 July 2019

Enjoy Your Life is the debut studio album by Nigerian singer Lady Donli. It was released on 9 August 2019. The album features guest appearances from Tems, BenjiFlow, Amaarae, SOMADINA, The Cavemen., VanJess, Tomi Thomas, and Solis. After the album's release, she embarked on a two-city concert in Nigeria, and a UK tour, in three cities from 26 January to 4 February 2020.

It was produced primarily by Lady Donli, with production from The Cavemen, DOZ, GMK, Jms, Tay Iwar, and Tomi Thomas. The album received generally positive reviews from critics. Lyrically, Enjoy Your Life communicates with elements associated with enjoyment with the necessary factors in life, including: money, a good time (party, food, and happiness), peace, dance, love, sex, great music (presumably for every kind of situation), and positivity. The album was supported by the tracks titled "Cash", and "Suffer Suffer".

== Background and promotion ==
On 31 October 2019, The Fader writer Joey Akan wrote: “Enjoy Your Life, is a buffet of retro-inspired African sounds, drawn from various parts of the continent, and melted into a sunny arch”. Speaking with Joey Akan, she said: "I wanted to create an album I felt was a Nigerian album. I also wanted to show people that there's so much more to Nigerian music".

On 29 July 2021, speaking with Zikoko! editor David Odunlami, Donli said: "I made Enjoy Your Life because I wasn't happy". On 21 August 2019, she discussed her debut album Enjoy Your Life, and how the project is so personal to her and her current state of mind on The PGM Radio Show with The Beat 99.9 FM Lagos head of music Douglas Jekan. On 22 August 2019, at The Beat 97.9 FM Abuja; Donli spoke with Chika and Itohan on The Morning Rush about her long-play project Enjoy Your Life and her Dad supporting her career choice, from when she was little writing poems.

== Release ==
On 5 April 2019, Lady Donli released "Cash", following the success of the song, she went on to release a remix with Davido. On 7 April 2019, she released the music video for "Cash", directed by Kewa Oni and Seun Opabisi. On 12 July 2019, Donli released "Suffer Suffer" as the second lead single off Enjoy Your Life.

== Critical reception ==
Professional ratings
Review scores
Source	Rating
Pulse Nigeria	8.9/10

Enjoy Your Life received generally positive reviews from music critics. In a review for Pulse Nigeria, Motolani Alake said that "Enjoy Your Life is what Odunsi hoped to achieve with rare., but he forgot one thing Donli prioritizes; she didn’t prioritize aesthetics and get comfortable with them. As stated earlier, the sounds are exceptional, yet substantiated by better songwriting."

In a review for YNaija, Wilfred Okiche said; “Think of Lady Donli’s Enjoy your Life as a retro time machine travelling through some of the most interesting musical eras of Nigerian a music. Or think of it as an aural feast, one that serves a menu of retro-inspired African sounds, drawn from east and west and north and south. Enjoy Your Life is music that only an Afropolitan in Lady Donli’s mould would make. Edgy, traditional, conforming and yet totally rebelling from whatever else is on the radio, Enjoy Your Life may be the year’s most scattershot yet interesting record.”

== Track listing ==
Enjoy Your Life track listing
No.	Title	Writer(s)	Producer(s)	Length
1.	"Zaman Lafiya"	Zainab Elizabeth Donli	9TyMasta	1:02
2.	"Suffer Suffer"	Zainab Elizabeth Donli	Lady Donli; The Cavemen.; GMK	2:53
3.	"Cash"	Zainab Elizabeth Donli	Lady Donli; The Cavemen.	3:07
4.	"Good Time" (featuring Tems)	Donli; Temilade Openiyi	The Cavemen.; Lady Donli	3:08
5.	"Answers"	Zainab Elizabeth Donli	JMS	2:44
6.	"Boomerang"	Zainab Elizabeth Donli	The Cavemen.; Lady Donli; JMS	2:05
7.	"Take Me Home" (featuring BenjiFlow)	Zainab Elizabeth Donli; BenjiFlow	The Cavemen.	2:51
8.	"Flava" (featuring Somadina and Amaarae)	Donli; Somadina Onuoha; Ama Serwah Genfi	JMS	2:46
9.	"Corner" (featuring VanJess and The Cavemen.)	Donli; Ivana Nwokike; Jessica Nwokike; Kingsley Okorie; Benjamin James	The Cavemen.	2:50
10.	"Never Ending"	Zainab Elizabeth Donli	DOZ; Lady Donli	1:23
11.	"With The Kindness" (featuring Tomi Thomas)	Donli; Tomi Thomas	The Cavemen.; Lady Donli	3:16
12.	"Around"	Zainab Elizabeth Donli	Tay Iwar	1:51
13.	"Confidence/Feeling Cool" (featuring Solis)	Donli; Kammal Zulu-Okafor	The Cavemen.; Lady Donli	2:55
14.	"Trouble"	Zainab Elizabeth Donli	The Cavemen.	1:53
15.	"Bite The Dust"	Zainab Elizabeth Donli	Kingsley Okorie	2:22
Total length:				37:08

== Personnel ==
- Zainab Elizabeth Donli - Primary artist, writer, production (tracks 2, 3, 4, 6, 10, 11, 13)
- The Cavemen. - Primary producer (tracks 2, 3, 4, 6, 7, 9, 10, 11, 13, 14)
- 9TyMasta - Production (tracks 1)
- GMK - Production (tracks 2)
- JMS - Production (tracks 5, 8)
- DOZ - Production (tracks 10)
- Tay Iwar - Production (tracks 12)
- Kingsley Okorie - Production (tracks 15)

=== Instrumentals ===
- Efe Jazz - Live Guitars (tracks 1)
- Kingsley Okorie - Bass Guitar (tracks 5)
- Tomi Thomas - Guitars (tracks 13)
