= Teslìm: The Energy Still Lives in Me =

Teslìm

Studio album by Vector
- Released: 11 November 2022
- Genres: Hip hop; Afrobeats; rap
- Length: 49:00
- Producers: Vector (exec.); The Beatsmith; Majorbangs; Mr Kleb; Spaceboy Mecury; Cracker Mallo; Egar Boi; Kel P; Self; GMK; Killerkrane; Shado Chris

Vector chronology
Early Momo (2021)	Teslìm (2022)	Mama Maradona (2022)

Singles from Teslim
- 1. "Early Momo" Released: February 14, 2021; 2. "Mama Maradona" Released: September 2, 2022

Teslìm: The Energy Still Lives in Me is the fifth studio album by Nigerian rapper and songwriter Vector. It was released on 11 November 2022 through GRAP Entertainment and distributed by ONErpm. The album features guest appearances from Wande Coal, Nasty C, Seun Kuti, Erigga, Ladipoe, Cracker Mallo, Ichaba, Milare, Seyi Vibez, GoodGirl LA, A.O - Machine, and Shado Chris. The 16-track album combines elements from Hiphop, R&B, and Afropop with a percussive rhythms."Teslim" received favourable reviews from critics, as Adeayo Adebiyi for Pulse Nigeria said that "Vector offers fragments of himself that resonate with listeners’.

== Background and reception ==
The album made one of the most anticipated Nigerian albums of 2022.

On February 14, 2021, Vector collaborated with Nigerian pop singer GoodGirl LA on the track titled ‘Early Momo’ which serves as one of the lead single off the project.

On November 2, 2022, Vector revealed the release date for his third studio album via Lafiaji Radio', a podcast channel, that was established on Cool FM and YouTube.

Vector enlisted producers like That Beatsmith, Majorbangs, Mr Kleb, Spaceboy Mecury, Cracker Mallo, Egar Boi, Kel P, Self, GMK.

On September 2, 2022, Vector collaborated with Nigerian singer and songwriter Wande Coal, which serves as the second single off the project.

== Composition ==
With TESLIM, which he describes as "music according to my life's truth and tale," Vector considers a variety of topics, including parenting, love, politics, and his country. He attempts to defy industry rules on "Teslim Introductory," converses with his daughter on "I Need You," and implores listeners to see their value in "You Don't Know." On "Mercy," Vector pays gratitude to his father. He also displays his poetic skill on "Clowns" and "What's That II," and on the album's final track, "My Name," he is in a self-assured attitude. Vector dominates the 16-track album TESLIM with flawless lyrics, compelling songwriting, and breathtaking musicianship..

TESLIM album, Vector says, "I thought I had a notion of what my album was going to be, then suddenly your dad passes, and you start to see that life is vain, you start to re-evaluate and rediscover the significance of the things you do. I began to reconsider the nature of my music, the message it should convey, and how I wanted it to sound. I was also wondering how it is that we are so easily sidetracked by things that we really don't care about if life is a transient thing that we all can't hold on to.”

One of the most well-known rap musicians to emerge from Africa, Vector has eight successful albums, EPs, and mixtapes to his credit. He also holds the record for the longest live rap freestyle ever performed on the continent, which has received over a million downloads. The celebrated cognac house's creative director and award-winning rap icon both represent Hennessy Artistry in Nigeria. International tastemakers including Apple Music, BET, MTV Base, and BBC 1Xtra have promoted the Lagos-born musician all across the world.

Since 2017, Vector experimented and created a sound for the album called Rapfrobeat. The album is a sonic expression and fusion of afrobeat and Rap/Hip-Hop genre.

== Critical reception ==
Professional ratings
Review scores
Source	Rating
Pulse Nigeria	8.3/10

"Teslim" received mixed reviews from music critics.In a Review for Pulse Nigeria, Adeayo Adebiyi said "The last part of the album offered a slower tempo as he talks about being a player, having an appetite for beautiful women, and knowing his way around the female body.

== Track listing ==
Credits adapted from Spotify.

No.	Title	Writer(s)	Producer(s)	Length
1.	"Introduction"	Olanrewaju David Ogunmefun	That Beatsmith	2:24
2.	"I Need You" (featuring Ichaba & Milare)	Michael Achibong; Olanrewaju David Ogunmefun	Major Bangs	4:03
3.	"Why Me"	Olanrewaju David Ogunmefun	Mr Kleb	3:11
4.	"You Don’t Know" (featuring Erigga)	Erhiga Agarivbie; Olanrewaju David Ogunmefun	Spaceboy Mercury	2:57
5.	"Insomnia" (featuring Cracker Mallo)	Ayodeji Olatunde Olowu; Olanrewaju David Ogunmefun	Cracker Mallo	2:45
6.	"Mercy" (featuring Seyi Vibez)	Balogun Afolabi Oluwaloseyi; Olanrewaju David Ogunmefun	Egar Boi	4:14
7.	"Soki Sombolo"	Olanrewaju David Ogunmefun	Kel P	2:51
8.	"Greed: Jayson Graham Call (Clowns Skit)"	Jayson Graham; Olanrewaju David Ogunmefun	President Jaga & Vector	1:04
9.	"Clowns" (featuring Ladipoe)	Ladipo Eso; Olanrewaju David Ogunmefun	GMK	2:19
10.	"Big Flexa" (featuring A.O - Machine)	Arinze Anthony Oruchie; Olanrewaju David Ogunmefun	Self	2:13
11.	"What’s That II" (featuring Nasty C)	Nsikayesizwe David Junior Ngcobo; Olanrewaju David Ogunmefun	Mr Kleb	2:56
12.	"Mama Maradona" (featuring Wande Coal)	Olanrewaju David Ogunmefun; Oluwatobi Wande Ojosipe	Mr Kleb	2:55
13.	"Mami Wota Iyemoja" (featuring Seun Kuti)	Olanrewaju David Ogunmefun; Oluseun Anikulapo Kuti	Mr Kleb	3:44
14.	"Early Momo" (featuring Goodgirl LA)	Ekumah Euphemia; Olanrewaju David Ogunmefun	Mr Kleb	3:14
15.	"Fefe (Ferrari)" (featuring Shado Chris)	Falé Christian Djérianémé Marc-Alexandre; Olanrewaju David Ogunmefun	Shado Chris & Self	3:30
16.	"My Name (Choral Version)"	Olanrewaju David Ogunmefun	Vector	3:59
Total length:				48:00

== Personnel ==
- Olanrewaju Ogunmefun - Primary artist, writer & producer, except for the featured artistes
- The Beatsmith - Production (Track 1)
- Majorbangs - Production (Track 2)
- Mr Kleb - Production (Track 3, 11, 12, 13, 14)
- Spaceboy Mecury - Production (Track 4)
- Cracker Mallo - Production (Track 5)
- Egar Boi - Production (Track 6)
- Kel P - Production (Track 7)
- Vector - Production (Track 8 & 16)
- GMK - Production (Track 9)
- Killerkrane (Track 10)
- Shado Chris - Production (Track 15)
- Mix House SA - Mixing & Mastering Engr.
- Swaps - Mix & Mastering (Track 16)
- Killerkrane & Vector - A&R
- Betty Anne & Olu The Wave (Additional A&R)
- WACPEOPLE - Creative Director

== Release history ==
Region	Date	Format	Version	Label	Ref
Various	11 November 2022	CD, digital download	Standard	GRAP Entertainment; ONErpm	
