= MI 2: The Movie =

Studio album by M.I Abaga
- Released: November 23, 2010
- Recorded: 2010
- Genres: Hip hop; highlife; R&B
- Length: 70:00
- Label: Chocolate City
- Producers: M.I; Tobi; Studio Magic; E-Kelly

M.I Abaga chronology
Illegal Music (2009)	MI 2: The Movie (2010)	Illegal Music 2 (2012)

Singles from MI 2: The Movie
- 1. "Undisputed" Released: November 2, 2010; 2. "Action Film" Released: December 10, 2010; 3. "Beef" Released: December 19, 2010; 4. "Nobody"

MI 2: The Movie (also known as MI 2) is the second studio album by Nigerian rapper M.I Abaga. It was released by Chocolate City on November 23, 2010. The album features collaborations with 2face Idibia, Bola Adebisi, Brymo, Flavour, Ice Prince, Jesse Jagz, Julius Ceaser, Femi Odukoya, Loose Kaynon, Praiz, Ruby Gyang, Timaya and Waje. M.I addresses a wide array of topics on the project, including corruption, poor education, the Niger Delta crisis, shooting, looting, and the sexual objectification of women. MI 2 was ranked the best Nigerian album of 2010 by music blog Jaguda, and won Best Album of the Year at the 2011 Nigeria Entertainment Awards. It also won Best Rap Album and was nominated for Album of the Year at The Headies 2011.

== Background and promotion ==
Primarily a hip hop album, MI 2 incorporates other musical styles such as highlife and R&B. Throughout the record, M.I fuses drum loop patterns with congas and melodious strings. The album's title is derived from the movie Mission: Impossible (1996). M.I announced in November 2010 that the album would include both an original soundtrack and a movie. Chocolate City also revealed that the movie would have three premieres. The first premiere would be an invite-only affair for industry insiders, and the second would be dedicated to three-hundred lucky fans. On December 10, 2010, M.I held an album release party for MI 2 at A-Lounge in Abuja.

The album's lead single, "Undisputed", was released on November 2, 2010. It was released amid reports about M.I's desire to venture into Nollywood. The accompanying music video for "Undisputed" was released in March 2011, along with an animated video for the album's opener "Prelude". The Brymo-assisted track "Action Film" was released on December 10, 2010, as the album's second single. An animated video for the song was released in June 2011.

The album's third single, "Beef", was released on December 19, 2010. It is a diss track targeted at Kelly Handsome and Iceberg Slim. "Nobody" was released as the album's fourth single. A leaked version of the song, which features vocals by 2face Idibia, appeared on several blog sites in February 2010.

== Composition ==
In the energetic track "Action Film", M.I declares his accomplishments and grand return. The subtle track "Slow Down" has been described as an ode to the beautification and characterization of women. The Flavour N'abania-assisted track "Number 1" is a blend of hip hop and highlife. In "Anybody", M.I addresses the hatred associated with fame. "Nobody" features guest vocals by 2Baba and tows the same line of the previous track. In "Beef", M.I responds to Iceberg Slim’s diss track and ridicules Kelly Handsome. "Wild Wild West" depicts the ills and sudden unrest in Jos. In "Craze", M.I addresses the state of corruption in Nigeria.

The melodious track "My Head My Belle" addresses the everyday norms of society. “Epic” features blissful chants from Nigerian singer Praiz. In "Undisputed", M.I proclaims to be a king, describing his present reign as untouchable. The Waje-assisted track "One Naira" has been described as a soulful record because of lyrics like "hey princess, I’m so into you/ ‘cause you see pass what my revenue is/ and love me for me, clever you/leave you that is something I’ll never do". In "Imperfect Me", M.I's close friends revealed that one of his faults is his air of haughtiness.

== Critical reception ==
Professional ratings
Review scores
Source	Rating
Nigerian Entertainment Today	4.5/5 stars
Jaguda	8.5/10

MI 2: The Movie received positive reviews from music critics. Music journalist Osagie Alonge doesn't believe M.I is the most lyrically dexterous Nigerian rapper, but ended up saying the album's "strong attitude and musical concept stays intact from start to finish". Reviewing for Nigerian Entertainment Today, Chiagoziem Onyekwena said the album shows M.I's "willingness to expand his sound, collaborating with artistes outside his comfort zone, toying with singing in patois and crucially, experimenting with an ingenious way to present music to the public".

Ladybrille magazine’s Uduak Oduok commended M.I for not putting out a braggadocious album and said it has "so much substance". Dafe Ivwurie of the Daily Independent newspaper said the album "strikes a balance between hardcore and commercial rap". In a less enthusiastic review, a writer for Jaguda.com characterized it as lacking the "wow" factor and said it would sound better if the movie skits were omitted.

=== Accolades ===
Year	Awards ceremony	Award description(s)	Results
2011	The Headies	Best Rap Album	Won
2011	The Headies	Album of the Year	Nominated
2011	The Headies	Lyricist on the Roll for "Undisputed"	Nominated
2011	The Headies	Best Collabo for "Number One"	Won
2011	Nigeria Entertainment Awards	Best Album of the Year	Won

== Track listing ==
No.	Title	Writer(s)	Producer(s)	Length
1.	"Prelude"	Jude Abaga	M.I	3:55
2.	"Action Film" (featuring Brymo)	Abaga; Olawale Ashimi	M.I	3:54
3.	"Slow Down" (featuring Julius Ceaser)	Abaga	M.I	4:02
4.	"Number 1" (featuring Flavour)	Abaga; Chinedu Okoli	M.I; E Kelly	3:13
5.	"Anybody" (featuring Timaya and Loose Kaynon)	Abaga; Inetimi Odon; Joakin Ikazoboh	M.I	4:46
6.	"Nobody" (featuring 2face Idibia)	Abaga; Innocent Idibia	M.I	5:02
7.	"Beef"	Abaga	M.I	3:55
8.	"Wild Wild West"	Abaga	M.I	5:01
9.	"My Head My Belle"	Abaga	M.I	4:38
10.	"One Naira" (featuring Waje)	Abaga; Aituaje Iruobe	M.I	4:30
11.	"Craze"	Abaga	M.I	3:42
12.	"Undisputed"	Abaga	M.I	2:49
13.	"Epic" (featuring Praiz)	Abaga; Praise Adejo	M.I	4:56
14.	"Imperfect Me" (featuring Femi Odukoya and Ruby Gyang)	Abaga; Femi Odukoya; Ngohide GyangGyang	M.I	10:34
15.	"Represent" (featuring Jesse Jagz, Ice Prince and Brymo)	Abaga; Jesse Abaga; Panshak Zamani; Ashimi	Platinum Toxx	5:18
Total length:				70:00

== Personnel ==
Credits adapted from the album's back cover.

- Audu Maikori – executive producer
- Paul Okeugo – executive producer
- Yahaya Maikori – executive producer
- Jude Abaga – primary artist, writer, executive producer, mixing, mastering
- E-Kelly – producer
- Tobi – producer
- Studio Magic – producer
- Jesse Garba Abaga – featured artist, vocals, writer
- Panshak Zamani – featured artist, vocals, writer, A&R
- Olawale Ashimi – featured artist, vocals, writer
- Innocent Ujah Idibia – featured artist, vocals, writer
- Enitimi Alfred Odom – featured artist, vocals, writer
- Aituaje Iruobe – featured artist, vocals, writer
- Chinedu Okoli – featured artist, vocals, writer
- Julius Ceaser – featured artist, vocals, writer
- Joakin Ikazoboh – featured artist, vocals, writer
- Praise Ugbede Adejo – featured artist, vocals, writer
- Ngohide GyangGyang – featured artist, vocals, writer
- Femi Odukoya – featured artist, vocals, writer
- Bola Adebisi – featured artist, vocals, writer
- Kunle Peter Thomas – project coordinator
- Terver Malu – general manager, chief financial officer
- Doosuur Tilley Gyado – A&R
- Lolwa Adamson – A&R
- Kelechi Amadi Obi – photography
- Toni Tones – photography
- Ogbonnaya Williams Chukwudi – design
- Abuchi "Don Boos Boos" Ugwu – mixing, mastering
- Rytchus Era Productions – production company
- AHBU Ventures – distribution

== Release history ==
Region	Date	Format	Version	Label
Various	November 23, 2010	CD, Digital download	Standard	Chocolate City
