= Jeriq =

Nigerian rapper and singer (born 1999)

- Jeriq performing at Lagos Igbo Hangout 2026

Background information
- Also known as: Jeriq The Hussla
- Born: Jeremiah Chukwuebuka Ani; May 6, 1999 (age 27); Nkpor, Onitsha, Nigeria
- Origin: Enugu, Nigeria
- Genre: Hip hop
- Occupations: Rapper; singer; songwriter
- Years active: 2015-present

Jeremiah Chukwuebuka Ani (born May 6, 1999), known professionally as Jeriq, is a Nigerian rapper, singer, and songwriter. He gained initial recognition with the release of his EP Hood Boy Dream in 2020, which led to his signing with KOD Music Group that same year. His debut studio album, Billion Dollar Dream was released in 2022, and its follow-up, a deluxe version in 2023.

Billion Dollar Dream was nominated for Best Rap Album at The Headies 2023 Awards. The album featured the song My Bro (with Phyno), which received a nomination—Best Rap Song — at the same awards. Jeriq was featured on Zlatan's song Oganigwe, which reached number 47 on the Billboard Afrobeat Charts. Later in 2023, his collaborative track with rapper Blaqbonez, Nyem Ego (2021), was listed by Rolling Stone as one of the 40 Best Afropop Songs of the Year.

== Early life ==
Chukwuebuka was born in Nkpor, Anambra, Jeriq Hails from Enugu. He is the first child out of five. He attended his secondary education at College of the Immaculate Conception, Enugu and proceeded to Enugu State University of Science and Technology (ESUT), where he obtained his bachelor's degree in Computer Science in 2021.

== Career ==
Jeriq began his music career in 2015 but gained wider recognition in 2020 following the release of his EP Hood Boy Dream. His music incorporates influences from his Igbo heritage. That same year, he signed with KOD Music.

In 2022, he released his debut studio album, Billion Dollar Dream, which consists of twelve tracks and features guest artists such as PsychoYP, Kofi Jamar, Flavour, Alpha P, and Dremo. A deluxe edition of the album, including five additional tracks, was released in 2023.

In a review for The Native, critic Chibuzo Emmanuel described the album as showcasing Jeriq’s potential to become one of the leading artists in Nigeria. His single My Bro and the album Billion Dollar Dream were both nominated at The Headies 2023 Awards for Best Rap Single and Best Rap Album, respectively.

In 2023, Jeriq was featured on Worthy, a track from Gen Uru's album of the same name, which was overseen by Nigerian rapper Illibliss. On May 13, 2023, he made his debut on the Billboard Afrobeat Charts, appearing at number 47 as a featured artist on Zlatan's song Oganigwe, alongside Odumodublvck. Later that year, Rolling Stone recognized his collaboration with Blaqbonez, Nyem Ego, as one of the "40 Best Afropop Songs of 2023."

Jeriq hosted the Jeriq Hood Concert at the Chuba Ikpeazu Stadium in Onitsha on November 24, 2024, with an audience of over 20,000 people. On December 10, 2023, the concert took place in his hometown, Enugu, attracting 15,000 attendees at Okpara Square. He returned to Enugu for another concert on December 20, 2024, performing at the Nnamdi Azikwe stadium before an audience of 22,000. Following these events, he received a plaque from the Enugu State Ministry of Culture and Tourism in recognition of the concerts.

In August 2024, Jeriq was named a brand ambassador for Kedu App, a digital platform for connecting Igbo people.

== Discography ==
Albums
Title	Details
Billion Dollar Dream	Released: May 26, 2022; Format: Digital Download
Billion Dollar Dream (Deluxe Version)	Released: January 26, 2023; Format: Digital Download
King	Released: August 16, 2024; Format: Digital Download

Extended Play
Title	Details
Hood Boy Dreams	Released: May 6, 2020; Format: Digital Download
East N West with Dremo	Released: April 23, 2021; Format: Digital Download
Evil Twin with PsychoYP	Released: January 26, 2024; Format: Digital Download

== Awards and nominations ==
Year	Event	Category	Work	Result	Ref
2023	The Headies 2023 Awards	Best rap single	My Bro ft. (Phyno)	Nominated	
2023	The Headies 2023 Awards	Best rap album	Billion Dollar Dream	Nominated	
2024	The Headies Awards	Best rap single	Ije Nwoke	Nominated	
