= GoodGirl LA =

Nigerian singer

- Born: Euphemia Runyi Ekumah
- Genres: Afrobeats; R&B; Afro-pop
- Occupation: Singer
- Instrument: Vocals
- Label: Vibez Music Factory

Euphemia Runyi Ekumah,better known as GoodGirl LA, is a Nigerian singer and songwriter.

== Early life and education ==
Ekunah was born in Ajegunle. She attended the University of Calabar, but left to pursue her musical career. She previously performed as "Laden", which was shortened to "LA", and eventually became "GoodGirl LA".

== Career ==
GoodGirl LA's first singles included "Faraway", "Bless Me", and "Pina". In 2019, she released her debut EP LA Confidential. In 2020, she released her hit single "D4DM (Die For The Matter)".

Released on Valentine's Day 2021, "Early Momo" featuring GoodGirl LA is the lead single on Vector's album T.E.S.L.I.M. GoodGirl LA's song "Bando" was inspired by Nigerian youth participating in the #EndSARS protests.

In 2022, she was nominated with Vector for The Headies awards for best collaboration and best rap single for "Early Momo".

In May 2025, GoodGirl LA signed a record deal with Nigerian producer Andre Vibez's Vibez Music Factory, under which she released her EP Goodgirl in July 2025.

== Critical reception ==
In 2021, This Day newspaper in Nigeria called "Bando" "a breath of fresh air".

== Discography ==
=== EP ===
- Goodgirl
- LA Confidential

=== Singles ===
- Goodgirl
- "D4DM"

== Awards and nominations ==
Year	Award	Category	Recipient	Result	Ref
2019	The Headies	Best Vocal Performance (Female)	GoodGirl LA	Nominated	
2020	City People Music Awards	Next Rated Artiste (Female)	GoodGirl LA	Nominated	
2022	The Headies	Best Collaboration	Vector, GoodGirl LA	Nominated	
2022	The Headies	Best Rap Single	Vector, GoodGirl LA	Nominated	
