= Vector (rapper) =

Nigerian rapper (born 1984)

Olanrewaju
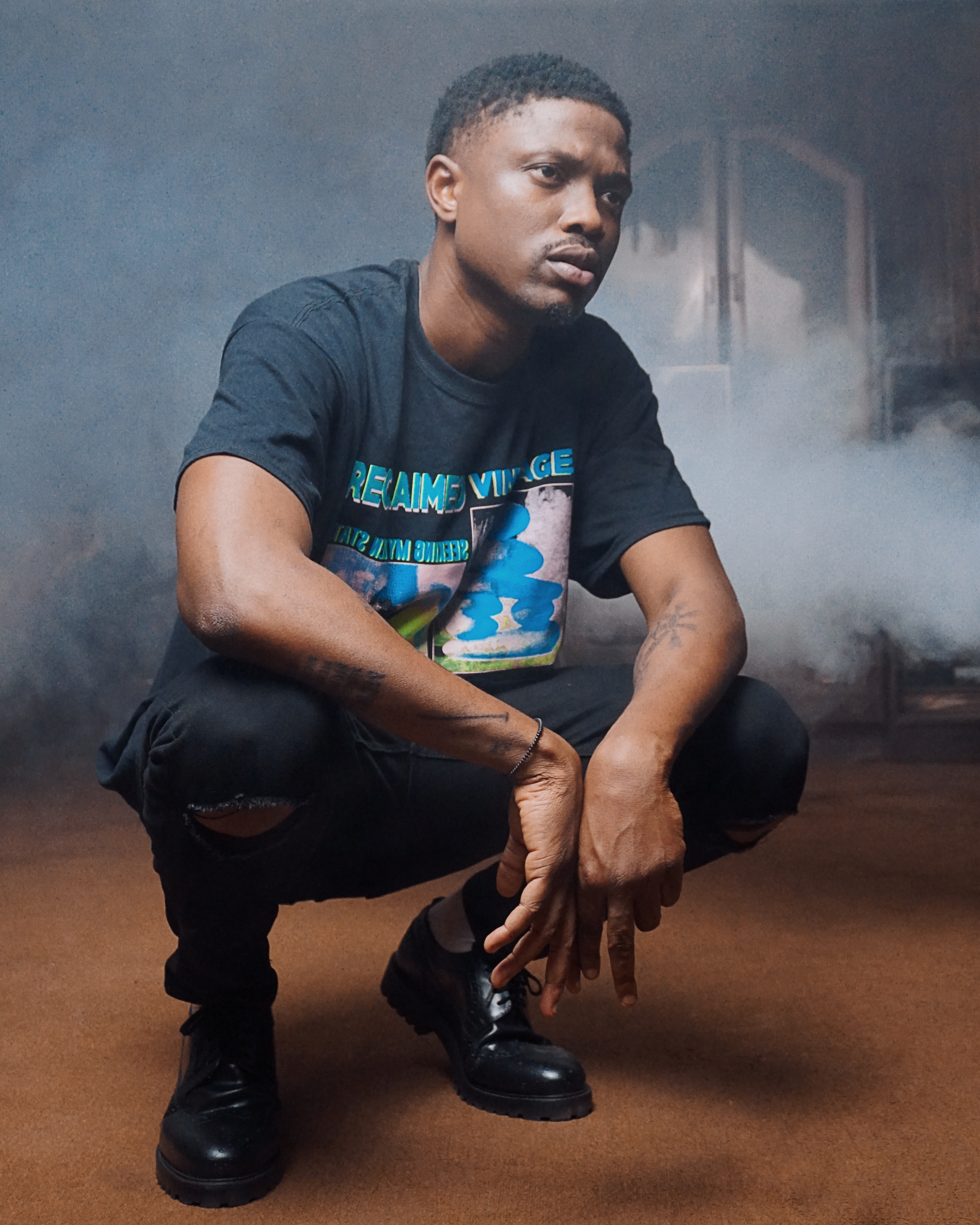
- Vector at No Peace Video Shoot 2020

Background information
- Also known as: V.E.C, Vector Tha Viper
- Born: Olanrewaju Ogunmefun David; 7 August 1984 (age 41); Lagos, Nigeria
- Origin: Ogun, Nigeria
- Genres: Hip Hop; Rap; Rapfrobeat
- Occupations: Rapper; singer; record producer; songwriter; actor
- Instrument: Vocals | guitar
- Years active: 2008–present
- Labels: GRAP Entertainment (current); Def Jam Africa (former); YSG Entertainment (former)
- Website: vectorthaviper.me

Olanrewaju Ogunmefun, better known by his stage name Vector, is a Nigerian rapper, singer and songwriter. He has released three studio albums, including State of Surprise and The Second Coming (2012). In anticipation of his second studio album, he released a mixtape titled Bar Racks. Lafíaji, his third studio album was released in December 2016. He also released a mixtape in October 2018, The Rap Dialogue, in an effort to keep the spirit of Nigerian hip-hop alive. In November 2019, his fourth studio album, Vibes Before Teslim: A Journey to Self-Discovery, was released.

He is the voice behind a Sprite commercial that aired on radio stations across Nigeria since 2009. He also had "the longest freestyle rap in Nigeria".

In November 2019, he signed a joint venture with Starstruck Management Inc and Create Music Group to release his 4th studio project Extended play titled "Vibes Before Teslim: A Journey To Self-Discovery".

== Early life ==
Lanre was born in Lagos State, hails from Ogun State, the fourth of five children. He schooled in Nigeria attending Command children school, Ijebu Ode Grammar School, Government College Victoria Island & Saint Gregory's College Ikoyi Lagos. He started his journey into hip-hop in junior high in 1994. In St. Gregory's College, he was involved in various social activities in which he was made to perform on stage. In 1999, he formed a duo called Badder Boiz, who wrote their own songs and in the same year went on to start performing at showcases as a trio.

They recorded their first demo in 1999 and attended talent showcases. Vector was going in the direction of an emcee. As a group of three, consisting of Vector, Krystal & Blaze, they were together until 2004 when Krystal left due to irreconcilable differences. He then attended the University of Lagos, graduating in 2008 with a bachelor's degree in philosophy.

== Career ==
Vector released his first official single "Kilode" for the album State of Surprise in February 2010. He later released the video for this single in June 2010. His second official single was "Mary Jane" which was released in April of the same year. The album was released on 29 October 2010, executive produced by Eloka "Culture" Oligbo. It featured 2 Face Idibia, General Pype, Chuddy K, Ade Piper, Emmsong, Sista Soul and with productions from H-Code, Sam Klef, Da Piano, J-Smith, Xela Xelz and Vibez Production.

He released a video for the song "Get Down" featuring 2Face Idibia in June 2011. At the Nigerian Music Video Awards 2011, he was nominated for "Best Mainstream Hip Hop Video". He was nominated at the 2010 Nigeria Entertainment Awards for "Best Collaboration With Vocals" with the track "Champion" in which he was featured in by General Pype.

His singles "Angeli" ft. 9ice and "Mr. Vector" featuring Jazzy, both produced by Sagzy were released on 19 May 2011 and were on heavy rotation on radio stations around the country. The video for "Angeli" was released in October 2011. In 2020, himself and Bigtril, released a song called "OG" that featured Raezy and Larry Gaaga. He has another collaboration with pallaso, called bubble remix.

Vector released the track "Born Leader" featuring Mavado of DJ Khaled's We the Best Music Group. "Born Leader" was Vector's third single off his second album titled The Second Coming. He shot the video in Miami, Florida and it was directed by Antwan Smith. In August 2013 he was featured by Pheelz a producer on a song titled "Popular" which gained airplay in radio stations across Nigeria.

In January 2015 Vector released a rap single titled "King Kong" and the video was released the same month. Vector released two remixes with the first one featuring Phyno, Reminisce, Classiq and Uzi, and the second remix featuring Ghanaian rapper Sarkodie which was released in May and June 2015 respectively. The video for the first remix was released in July 2015. On 15 July he released a fresh single titled "Kanawan Dabo" and on 24 July he released a freestyle titled "8". In May 2020, he signed a record deal with Def Jam Africa, a flagship of Def Jam Recordings in Nigeria. In December 2022 Vector was featured in Africa Cypher (Hennessy Cypher) that happened in Nigeria, the Cypher also featured artists such as A-Reece, M.I Abaga, M.anifest and Octopizzo.

== Controversy ==
Nigerian artiste Reminisce recorded a diss track "ATA (Street Kitchen Reply)" with the line, "V-E what shit ki lo’n je be. Shebi iwo lo rap ju shit o ma pe’n nbe" in reply to Vector's verse on Sauce Kid's "KitcheStreet" in which Vector said "For all those boys wey dey show. Ti e ba fe ma form pe eyin lata ani tomato to ma to".

After this incidence Vector has replied with the track "Distractions (Reminisce Diss)", which he featured on with renowned lyricist A-Q. Vector hit him with the lines, "Cos you bleach your skin doesn't mean you are enlightened, Pig. I'm the base and my crew be strong, you cannot be the best cause you had one stupid song" and "And I'm made oh, and it's so public. But you, your life is like your videos, low budget." He was also in a rap supremacy battle with Jude "M.I" Abaga, and released diss tracks such as "The Purge" (featuring Vader and Payper) and also #JudasTheRat which was a response to M.I's #ThaViper.

In 2020, Vector and Jude "M.I" Abaga seem to have squashed their battle when they both met in the third and final part of "The Conversation", a Hennessy Nigeria documentary series based on the rivalry between M.I and Vector, the duo met face-to-face and discussed what transpired between them. Both rappers addressed what caused the beef and their thoughts on each other. M.I said he had the impression that Vector just didn't like him, while Vector said he believed M.I was cunning and deceptive.

When asked by the interviewer if there was a possibility of a collaboration, Vector replied: "If this energy is pure, then there is no way I don't see a collaboration happening".

He however said in February 2021 that his beef with M.I sold them records. He said "Did we make money with the beef tracks? Yes, the records sold. Yes, there comes a special demand for beef tracks by the fans. Our songs were streamed a lot; I mean, we trended at number one in the Genius.com, a lyrics website, which means Nigerians can go on and write something for the world to read and enjoy".

Himself and M.I Abaga eventually ended their contention in 2021, and eventually collaborated on a rap track titled "Crown of Clay". The track also featured Nigerian producer, Pheelz, after which himself and M.I proceeded to take part in two editions of the Hennessy Cypher in 2021, and 2023.

== Discography ==
=== Studio albums ===
- State of Surprise (2010)
- The Second Coming (2012)
- Lafíaji (2016)
- Vibes Before Teslim: A Journey To Self-Discovery (2019)
- Teslìm: The Energy Still Lives in Me (2022)

=== Mixtapes ===
- Bar-Racks The Mixtape (2012)
- A7 (2014)

==== Extended plays ====
- The Rap Dialogue (2018)
- The African Mind (2020)

==== Collaborative albums ====
- Crossroads EP ( With Masterkraft ) (2020)

== Filmography ==
=== Film ===
Year	Title	Role	Note	Ref.
2018	June	Adewale		
2018	Lara & The Beat	Sally.aka. Mr. Beats		

== TV and series ==
Year	Title	Role	Note	Ref
2019	Shuga Naija	Himself		
2020	Shuga Naija: Alone Together Web Series	Himself		

== Singles ==
Singles
Year	Title
2011	Angeli feat.9ice
2015	"King Kong" (Remix) (featuring Phyno, Reminisce, ClassiQ and Uzi)
2015	"King Kong" (Remix) (featuring Sarkodie)
2016	"Agege"(Splash featuring Vector)
2017	"Gunshot"
2017	"Gee Boys" (featuring CDQ)
2017	"Like My Daddy"
2017	"Seaside" (featuring Korede Bello)
2018	"This One Is"
2018	"Mad"
2018	"Be Happy" (featuring Daddy Showkey)
2019	"This Vector Sef"
2019	"Comfort" (featuring) [(Davido)]
2021	"License"

== Albums and EPs ==
Year	Title
2010	State of Surprise [LP] (featuring 2Baba, H-Code, Emmsong, General Pype, Sista Soul, Slygriff, Shogun, Chuddy K & Ade Piper)
2012	The Second Coming [LP] (featuring Mavado, Shank, Del-B, Muno, Sound Sultan, Rocksteady, Emmsong, Modenine, Badman Floss, Jazzy & 9ice)
2016	Lafíaji [LP] (featuring, D'banj, Rotex, Shola Vibrate, Emmsong, Jesse Jagz, CDQ, Falz, J-Martins, Vanessa Mdee, Obadice & Legeley)
2019	Vibes Before Teslim: A Journey to Self-Discovery [EP] (featuring Davido, Slimcase, Dj Niyor, BrisB & YinxDjinx)
2020	Crossroads [EP] (featuring DJ Neptune, Masterkraft)
2020	The African Mind [EP]
2022	Teslim: The Energy Still Lives in Me [LP] (featuring Wande Coal, Nasty C, Seun Kuti, Erigga, Ladipoe, Cracker Mallo, Ichaba, Milare, Seyi Vibez, GoodGirl LA, A.O – Machine, and Shado Chris)

== Awards and nominations ==
Year	Award Ceremony.	Award Category	Recipient/ Work	Result
2011	Nigerian Music Video Awards (NMVA)	Best Mainstream Hip-Hop Video	Get Down (featuring 2Baba)	Won
2011	Dynamix All Youth Awards	Best New Act	Himself	Nominated
	The Headies	Lyricist on the Roll	Himself	Nominated
2012	Dynamix All Youth Awards	Recognition Award	Himself	Won
2012	The Headies	Best Rap Single	Himself	Won
2012	The Headies	Lyricist on the Roll	Himself	Won
2012	Nigeria Entertainment Awards	Best Rap Act	Himself	Won
2012	Nigerian Music Video Awards (NMVA) 2012	Best Afro Hip-Hop Video	Angeli (feat 9ice).	Won
2015	The Headies	Lyricist on the Roll, Best Rap Single	Himself	Won
2015	The Headies	Best Rap Single	King Kong	Won
2021	Afro X Digitals Awards	Best Rap Single of the Year	Crown of Clay	Won
2023	The Headies	Best Rap Album	Teslim: The Energy Still Lives In Me	Nominated
2023	The Headies	Lyricist on the roll	Clowns	Nominated

== See also ==
- List of Nigerian rappers
