= Somadina =

- Born: Port Harcourt, Nigeria
- Genres: Alternative; R&B; afropop; electronic
- Occupations: Singer; songwriter; record producer
- Instruments: Vocals; piano; guitar
- Years active: 2018–present
- Label: Somadina Sounds
- Website: somadinasounds.com

Somadina (born 22 March 2000) is a Nigerian singer and songwriter. She officially started her music career in 2018 with her debut single titled "IHY" which stands for "I hate you".

In March 2023, she was announced as one of the African artists to perform at the American Musical Festival, Lollapalooza Chicago alongside Nigerian artists, Tems and Rema

== Early life ==
Somadina was born in Port Harcourt, Nigeria on 22 March 2000 to Nigerian parents. At the age of one, she moved to the Netherlands because her father worked there. After her secondary education at St. George's School, Ascot, an independent girls' boarding and day school in Berkshire, England, she moved to London, England where she got a university degree in Sociology from the University of Warwick. After acquiring her degree in London, she returned to Nigeria to fully pursue her career in music.

Her musical experience typically started from childhood owing to her father's love for music. Growing up in a music-oriented family, she composed her first song at the age of seven and started taking music lessons at the age of nine. She was taught by a Russian music teacher how to play the piano. At thirteen, she had become a performer with her first public performance at her mother's 40th birthday celebration.

== Music career ==
=== 2018–2021: Career beginnings ===
Somadina officially started her music career in 2018. She debuted her first single titled "IHY" which stands for "I hate you" in October 2018, a breakup song which was recorded in the studio. She soon started her own independent label, "Somadina Sounds" in partnership with Chin Okeke. In 2019, she released a single titled "Lay Low" featuring Orinayo.

In February 2020, she debuted her first 5-track EP titled "Five Stages". However, Five Stages was not a commercial release and is not available on SoundCloud. In December 2020, Somadina released a single titled "Kno Me" featuring SGaWD.

In October 2021, she announced a single titled 'Supersoma"

=== 2022–2023: Heart of the Heavenly Undeniable ===
In November 2022, Somadina released her EP titled "Heart of the Heavenly Undeniable" (HOTHU), comprising 11 tracks including Small Paradise, Time 2 Time and Dirty Line. She launched the EP with a one-off immersive audio-visual exhibition of HOTHU exclusively at Africa's largest art fair, ART X. This was shortly followed by a London showcase at Kindred Member's club and a release party at Soho House Berlin, capping off her promo run opening for CKay at Koko in London. To mark the project, she released a single titled "Y I Want You". It featured artists like Zamir, The Cavemen and Odunsi the Engine, and was released under Somadina Sounds.

In September 2022, she released a single titled "Rolling Loud". This was her first official release under her independent label, Somadina Sounds. In October that same year, she released the remix-EP of Rolling Loud. The release featured 6 remixes from DJ's connecting Africa and the diaspora including Jelani "Pops" Shaw, TNK Musiq (aka Kyle and T-man), DJ Van and Ghanaian masked DJ, TMSKD.

In March 2023, she was announced as one of the Nigerian artists to perform at the 2023 Lollapalooza Chicago alongside Tems and Rema

== Artistry ==
=== Style ===
Growing up, Somadina was highly influenced by R&B, which clearly shows in her style of music; however, she revealed that she prefers to identify with afro-psychedelic rock. The Guardian describes her as an "eccentric and captivating musician, churning out a radical discography baked with influences from Pop, Alternative rock, and RnB".

=== Influences ===
Somadina grew up with early exposure to music. She considers her father, a lover of RnB music to be one of her strongest inspirations. In several interviews with the media, she revealed that she had experienced a wide range of musical influences, including John Legend, Fela Kuti, Asa, Avril Lavigne, Williams Onyeabor and Shampoo. She was also greatly influenced by music of the 70s making her combine African musical elements and the 80s metallic-instrumental rock style.

== Discography ==
=== As lead artist ===
==== EPs ====
Title	EP Details
Rolling Loud (Remixes EP)	Release Date:October 2022; Format: Digital Download, Streaming
Heart of the Heavenly Undeniable (HOTHU)	Release Date: November 2022; Format: Digital Download, Streaming

==== Singles ====
Title	Year	Album
IHY	2018	Non-Album Single
Lay Low (feat. Orinayo)	2019	Non-Album Single
Kno Me (feat. SGaWD)	2020	Non-Album Single
Supersoma	2021	Non-Album Single
Rolling Loud	2022	Non-Album Single
Y I Want You	2022	Non-Album Single

=== As featured artist ===
Title	Year
FLAVA – Lady Donli (feat. Somadina & Amaarae)	2019
POPSHIT – SGaWD (feat. Somadina)	2021
Cruel Love – NATIVE Sound System & Sholz (feat. TAR1Q & Somadina)	2023

== Recognition ==
In 2022, her EP "Heart of the Heavenly Undeniable" was listed as one of Times best albums.

In January 2022, she was listed by Vogue as one of the musicians set to rule the music industry in 2022. She was also listed by NME as one of the 100 emerging artists for 2023. In March 2023, she was mentioned as one of the African women redefining Pop on Billboard, and was announced as one of the African artists to perform at the American Musical Festival in Lollapalooza, Chicago alongside Nigerian artists: Tems and Rema.
