= Spyro (musician) =

Nigerian singer and songwriter

- Born: Oludipe Oluwasanmi David; 1 October 1990 (age 35); Lagos State, Nigeria
- Genres: Afrobeats; dancehall; afro pop
- Occupations: Singer; songwriter
- Years active: 2017–present
- Label: TAP Music Entertainment

Oludipe Oluwasanmi David (born October 1, 1990) professionally known as Spyro is a Nigerian singer and songwriter, he gained widespread recognition after the release of his single "Billing" which was released in July 2022. He is best known for his song "Who is your Guy?" which was first released in November 2022 and re-released in March 2023 as a remix featuring Tiwa Savage.

Spyro also has music collaborations with Mayorkun, Dremo, Sound Sultan, Diamond Platnumz, Davido and many others.

== Early life and education ==
Oludipe Oluwasanmi David was born in Lagos and he hails from Lagos State. His primary school education was in New Mainland Children School. He then proceeded to Model College, Meiran where he completed his secondary school education. He graduated from the University of Ibadan in Oyo state.

== Career ==
Spyro started his musical career at a very tender age where he began singing in a church choir. He started music professionally in 2017 and he grew up choosing Usher and Joe as his mentors which has an influence in his music style. He started off as an independent artist and is still currently an independent artist under the auspices of TAP Music Entertainment.

Spyro revealed that he had humble beginnings and struggled so much that he had to resort to seeking financial assistance from his friends from university to feed himself.

Spyro rose to Stardom after the release of his song "Billing" in 2022 which was listed on Apple music Top 100. He later released "Who is your Guy?" in November 2022 which has amassed so much recognition, the song topped the list of most shazamed songs and Apple's Top 10 music chart in several African countries including Nigeria, Ghana, Sierra Leone, and Gambia. The song also became Tiwa savage and Spyro's highest-charting single

In 2023 The Governor of Lagos State Babajide Sanwo-Olu picked "Who is your Guy?" as his favorite song following his re-election for a second term in office. Following the success of the song, Spyro did a remix of the song featuring Tiwa savage released in March 2023. David later released the visuals of the song and it has so far garnered over 150 million views on YouTube. Spyro 's single "Who is your guy?" was nominated for "Afrobeats single of the year" and the remix featuring Tiwa Savage was nominated and won the award for "Best Collaboration" at the Headies award 2023. He was also nominated for Headies next rated award alongside Young John, Victony, Seyi Vibez and Asake.The song was also nominated for Best Collaboration at the AFRIMMA 2023 and won. In May 2023, Spyro announced a Uk and Europe tour, he will be touring 12 cities in the UK and about 20 European cities.

== Controversies ==
In May 2023, Spyro stirred up reactions as he said in an interview session with Cool FM that he can never collaborate with Portable stating that their kind of music doesn't align. Portable quickly responded to Spyro by questioning his accomplishment in the music industry, raising queries about his earnings and the number of shows he had performed in.

== Discography ==
=== Albums ===
List of Albums with selected details
Title	Music Details	Year released
The Men, The Boys & Your Guy	Released: September 26, 2025; Number of Tracks: 19; Label: TAP Music; Formats: Streaming, digital download	2025

=== Extended play ===
List of EPs with selected details
Title	Music Details	Year released
Next Rated	Released: November 10, 2023; Number of Tracks: 6; Label: TAP Music; Formats: Streaming, digital download	2023

=== Singles ===
List of singles as lead artist
Song title	Year	Featured artist(s)	Album	Ref(s)
Puff puff	2017	—N/a	Non-album single	
Funke (remix)	2018	Davido, Mayorkun	Non-album single	
Japa	2018	Tobi Bakare,Dremo	Non-album single	
Amazing	2019	—N/a	Non-album single	
Gunshot	2019	—N/a	Non-album single	
Stay with me	2020	Jeff Akoh	Non-album single	
For you	2020	—N/a	Non-album single	
102	2021	—N/a	Non-album single	
Billing	2022	—N/a	Non-album single	
Who is your guy?	2022	—N/a	Non-album single	
Who is your guy (remix)	2023	Tiwa Savage	Non-album single	
For You	2023	Diamond platnumz, Teni, Iyanya	Non-album single	
Only Fine Girl	2023	—N/a	Next Rated	
Next Rated	2023	—N/a	Next Rated	
Only Fine Girl (remix)	2023	Simi	Non-album single	
No Gree For Anybody (NGFA)	2024	—N/a	Non-album single	
Shutdown	2024	Phyno	Non-album single	

List of singles as featuring artist, with selected details
Song title	Year	Other artist(s)	Album	Ref(s)
Count Your blessings	2023	Dj Neptune	Non-album single	
Bounce	2023	Bu$h	Single	

== Awards and nominations ==
Year	Awards ceremony	Award description(s)	Nominated work	Results	Ref(s)
2023	The Headies	Best Collaboration	Who is Your guy remix (featuring Tiwa Savage)	Won	
2023	The Headies	Next Rated	Himself	Nominated	
2023	The Headies	Afrobeats single of the year	Who is Your guy?	Nominated	
2023	AFRIMMA	Best Collaboration	Who is Your guy remix (featuring Tiwa Savage)	Won	
