= M.I Abaga =

Nigerian rapper and record producer (born 1981)

M.I Abaga MFR
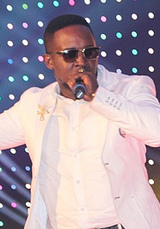
- M.I Abaga in 2014

Background information
- Also known as: M.I
- Born: Jude Lemfani Abaga; 4 October 1981 (age 44); Jos, Nigeria
- Genres: Hip hop; Afrobeats
- Occupations: Rapper; record producer; entrepreneur
- Instruments: Vocals; keyboard; piano
- Years active: 2003–present
- Labels: Incredible Music; Chocolate City
- Spouse: Eniola Mafe-Abaga (m. 2022)

Jude Lemfani Abaga (born 4 October 1981), known professionally as M.I Abaga or M.I, is a Nigerian rapper, songwriter, record producer, and entrepreneur. He gained recognition after releasing the 2006 single "Crowd Mentality", which appeared on his debut studio album Talk About It (2008).

Since then, he has released the albums MI 2: The Movie (2010), The Chairman (2014), and The Guy (2022). He was the CEO of Chocolate City from 2015 to 2019 before leaving in 2020 to establish his own label, Incredible Music. He is known for revolutionizing Nigerian hip hop on the continent, including how rap cyhers in Africa are made. According to Okay Africa, M.I is one of the greatest African rappers of all time. His awards include Best Hip-Hop Act at the MTV Africa Music Awards in 2009, and a nomination for the BET Awards in 2010.

== Early life and career ==
Abaga was born in Jos, Plateau State, Nigeria to parents from Takum in Taraba state. He attended Baptist High School, Jos, and has two brothers. His mother bought him a musical piano and he listened to songs by Lauryn Hill, Bob Marley, Sarah McLachlan, Pablo Neruda, Jay-Z and DMX; those which built him into the music world. Abaga proceeded to Calvin College, Michigan, where he studied Business and Economics. He performed in school's shows and concerts.

Abaga began his music career after he had returned to Nigeria in 2003. In 2006, M.I Abaga gained nationwide attention with his song "Crowd Mentality". He followed up with his debut studio album Talk About It (2008). His first album gathered awards such as the Musician of the Year in the Modemen Awards in 2008, and Best Hip Hop Artist in the City People Entertainment Awards. His first mixtape was "Pyeri Boy", and later released a sample mixtape Illegal Music in 2009. His sophomore album, MI 2: The Movie (2010), featured songs such as "Undisputed", "Action Film and "Number One". Other singles during this period were "Safe", "Teaser", "Fast Money, Fast Cars" and "Anoti". In 2008, he won Lyricist on the Roll at The Headies and in 2009 won Best Hip-Hop Artist at the MTV Africa Music Awards. Illegal Music II (2012) followed. In 2013, notjustok.com ranked M.I as the fourth most talented rapper in Nigeria. M.I released "NotJustOk/Savage" on Illegal Music 3 in 2016 to clap back on being compared to other Nigerian rap stars and demanded that critics leave his name off their lists as a means to gain more traction for themselves.

Abaga was signed to Chocolate City. Following the advancement, he relocated from Jos to Abuja, and worked with many Nigerian artists. In 2013 he was appointed by Globacom as an ambassador and a judge in Glo X-Factor in 2013. In 2014, M.I released his third studio album, The Chairman, which marked a new era of business-minded hip-hop that mixed African rhythms with trap, jazz, and conscious rap. He collaborated with artists including Wizkid, Olamide, Ice Prince, and Patoranking. In 2015, he was appointed as the CEO of Chocolate City, a role he held until 2019. Under his leadership, the label signed and developed talents like Blaqbonez, CKay, and Dice Ailes. In 2016 he released Illegal Music 3: The Finale. It was followed by Rendezvous (2018). Yxng Dxnzl was released on 24 August 2018. The album was released as part of a collection of Nigerian rap albums titled LAMB August. On 6 March 2020, Abaga announced his departure from Chocolate City. In 2023 he was appointed special adviser to Caleb Mutfwang of Plateau State. After stepping down as CEO of Chocolate City, M.I founded the label Incredible Music in 2020 and released the EP Judah. In 2022, he released The Guy, featuring collaborations with artists like Nas, Olamide, Wande Coal, and Phyno. The album peaked at #1 on Apple Music Nigeria. Singles from the album included "The Guy", "Bigger", and "The Inside".

In addition to music, he is a business strategist, speaker, and influencer, working across creative industries in Africa. M.I is the CEO of TASCK, a creative and advocacy agency leveraging African talent for social change. He has spearheaded initiatives in voter education, civic engagement, and youth empowerment, partnering with organizations like YIAGA Africa and Luminate. Through Incredible Music and his podcast Talk About It, he continues to drive conversations at the intersection of music, leadership, and social innovation.

=== Feuds ===
There has been a rivalry between Nigerian artists, M.I Abaga and Kelly Hansome. This started when M.I in his track "Fast Money, Fast Cars" stated, "Kelly Hansome is handsome, I'll tell him when I see him. But if I want a man, it'd be Keke or D1". In response, Kelly Hansome released "Catch Me If You Can", where he mocks the Chocolate City label. In response, the Choc City camp released "Nobody Test Me" with a line from M.I talking directly to Kelly Hansome: "Only one Kelly that I know, Kelly Rowland. Why would I diss them, give them cheap promotion. I think that they're so dry, I should give them lotion". Later, Kelly Hansome released "Chocolate Boys". M.I released a track on his 2010 album, M.I.2 named "Beef" and Kelly responded with the track Finish You Boy.

In 2009 a US-based rapper by the name Iceberg Slim released a single titled Mr International where he said the lines: "Am I better than M.I? I don't know. Am I? Matter of fact you should ask M.I". In response, M.I released the single "Somebody Wants To Die", featuring his label mate Ice Prince on the track. Less than 48 hours later, IceBerg Slim released "Assassination" and it was reported that his Facebook status at the time of the release read: '"Somebody Wants To Die", I'll be responsible for the "Assassination"...' In 2012, both rappers decided to sweep the feud under the rug. Iceberg stated, "It was a healthy competition in Hip-Hop, which most people don't understand... Rap music is all about competition because it helps you grow and improve on yourself."

In 2019, M.I released the diss track "The Viper" about Vector, emphasizing his own penchant for mentoring and helping others, while Vector was more focused on his own career. Vector responded in the song "Judas, the rat".' In December 2020, Vector and M.I met during The Conversation, a documentary series based on the rivalry between M.I and Vector. M.I said he had the impression that Vector just didn't like him, while Vector said he believed M.I was cunning and deceptive. In March 2021, they collaborated on the songs "Crown of Clay" and "Spirit", the latter of which was the first track on the EP The Very Special Tape Volume 1.

== Personal life and other ventures ==
On 22 September 2022, M.I and Eniola Mafe married in Lagos. Beyond music, he is passionate about social impact, African youth empowerment, and mental health advocacy.

M.I was appointed a United Nations Goodwill Ambassador in 2012. M.I supports the Jostified campaign. He has achieved worldwide recognition as part of the vanguard of the "Afrobeats" wave. He is also an advocate for ADHD and emotional wellness.

Musicians who have cited M.I as inspirations to them include Jesse Jagz, Ice Prince, Odumodublvck, Phyno, Show Dem Camp, Khaligraph Jones, Cassper Nyovest, Nasty C, Blaqbonez, Ladipoe, A.Q, Loose Kaynon, and Ric Hassani. M.I's influences include Jay-Z, Nas, and The Game.

== Discography ==
Studio albums

- Talk About It (2008)
- MI 2: The Movie (2010)
- The Chairman (2014)
- A Study on Self Worth: Yxng Dxnzl (2018)
- The Guy (2022)

Compilation albums

- The Indestructible Choc Boi Nation (with Chocolate City) (2015)

Mixtapes and playlists

- Illegal Music (2009)
- Illegal Music 2 (2012)
- Illegal Music 3: The Finale (2016)
- Rendezvous (2018)

EPs

- Judah (2020)
- The Live Report (with A-Q) (2020)

== Filmography ==
Year	Movie	Role	Ref
2018	Chief Daddy	Mr. X	
2021	Namaste Wahala	Self	

== Awards and nominations ==
Year	Award	Category	Nominee/Work	Result	Ref.
2008	Modemen Awards	Musician of the Year	M.I Abaga	Won	
2008	Hip Hop World Awards	Best Rap Single	"Crowd Mentality"	Won	
2008	Hip Hop World Awards	Next Rated	M.I Abaga	Nominated	
2008	Hip Hop World Awards	Lyricist on the Roll	M.I Abaga for "Crowd Mentality"	Nominated	
2009	MTV Africa Music Awards	Best New Act	M.I Abaga	Won	
2009	Nigerian Music Video Awards	Best Mainstream Hip Hop Video	"Safe"	Won	
2009	Nigerian Music Video Awards	Best Use of Special Effects in a Music Video	"Safe"	Won	
2009	Nigerian Music Video Awards	Best Editor	Mex for "Safe"	Nominated	
2009	Nigerian Music Video Awards	Best Director	Mex for "Safe"	Nominated	
2009	Nigerian Entertainment Awards	Best New Act of the Year	M.I Abaga	Won	
2009	Hip Hop World Awards	Hip Hop World Revelation of the Year	M.I Abaga	Won	
2009	Hip Hop World Awards	Best Rap Album	Talk About It	Won	
2009	Hip Hop World Awards	Lyricist on the Roll	M.I Abaga	Nominated	
2010	The Future Awards	Musician of the Year	M.I Abaga	Won	
2010	Malaysian African Entertainment Awards	Musician of the Year	M.I Abaga	Won	
2010	City People Entertainment Awards	Musician of the Year	M.I Abaga	Won	
2010	National Daily	Artist of the Year	M.I Abaga	Won	
2010	Orange Wall of Fame	Most Amiable Brand	M.I Abaga	Won	
2010	Hip Hop World Awards	Best Rap Single	"Somebody Wants to Die"	Nominated	
2010	Hip Hop World Awards	Lyricist on the Roll	M.I Abaga for "Somebody Wants to Die"	Nominated	
2010	BET Awards	Best International Act	M.I Abaga	Nominated	
2011	Diaspora Professionals, Dubai	Artist of the Year	M.I Abaga	Nominated	
2011	The Headies	Artiste of the Year	M.I Abaga	Nominated	
2011	The Headies	Album of the Year	MI 2: The Movie	Nominated	
2015	The Headies	Best Rap Album	The Chairman	Won	
2015	The Headies	Album of the Year	The Chairman	Nominated	
2015	The Headies	Best Rap Single	"Bad Belle"	Nominated	
2018	The Headies	Best Rap Single	"You Rappers Should Fix Up Your Lives"	Won	
2018	The Headies	Lyricist on the Roll	M.I Abaga for "You Rappers Should Fix Up Your Lives"	Won	
2018	The Headies	Best Performer	M.I Abaga	Nominated	
2025	The Headies	Lyricist on the Roll	"Chocolate City Cypher"	Nominated	

== See also ==
- List of Nigerian rappers
