= Blaqbonez =

Nigerian rapper, singer and artist (born 1996)

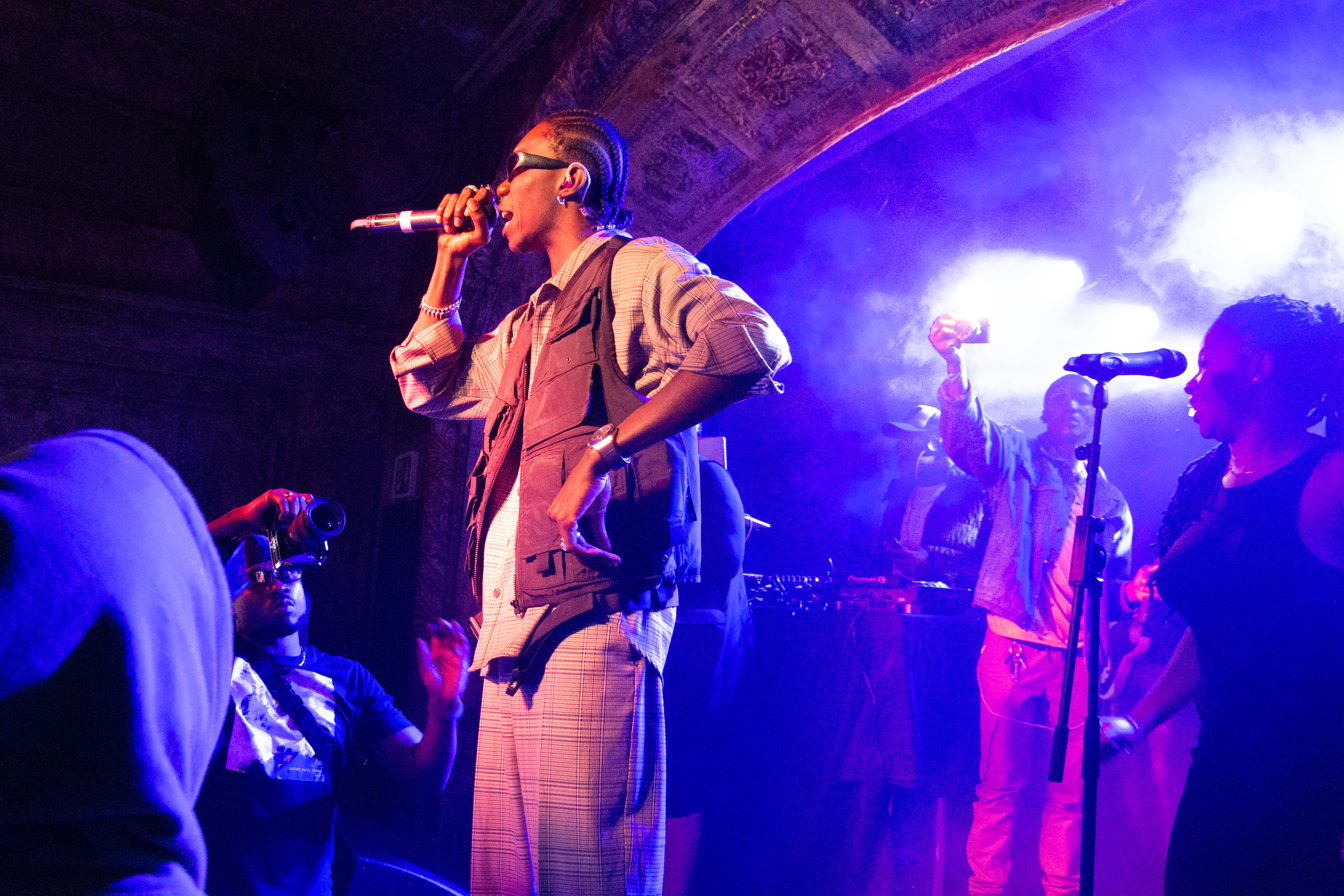
- Blaqbonez in 2022

Background information
- Also known as: Mr. Boombastic, Emeka The Stallion
- Born: Emeka Akumefule; 29 January 1996 (age 30); Imo, Nigeria
- Genres: Hip hop, Afro-fusion
- Occupations: Rapper; Singer; Songwriter; Artiste
- Instrument: Vocals
- Years active: 2012 – present
- Labels: 100 Crowns; Chocolate City
- Website: blaqbonez.com

Emeka Akumefule (born 29 January 1996), known professionally as Blaqbonez, is a Nigerian rapper and singer signed to Chocolate City.

Blaqbonez is popularly known for his distinct rap style as well as his creative ingenuity. In 2019, he was profiled by The New York Times as one of the new guards of Nigerian music. He is widely known for his controversial self-proclaimed status as the "Best Rapper in Africa" (abbreviated as "BRIA"), which became the most talked about topic in the Nigerian hip hop space between July and September 2019. After carving out one of rap's most loyal fan bases, Blaqbonez unleashed his debut album “Sex Over Love” to a public that was more than ready to receive it. His unorthodox approach and humorous personality, resonated with the younger generation, and earned him co-signs from the likes of Wizkid and Burna Boy.

== Early life and career ==
Emeka was born on 29 January 1996, to an Igbo family, and grew up exposed to the Yoruba and Urhobo culture in Nigeria. Blaqbonez hails from Imo state, a state in south-eastern Nigeria dominated by the Igbo tribe. He grew up with his mother, a pastor, in a Yoruba and Urhobo mixed environment. He had his tertiary education at Obafemi Awolowo University (OAU), where he studied Computer Engineering.

He was 13 years old when he discovered he could rap, and his journey into music was a result of happenstance. He self-discovered his talent while listening to the radio with his cousin, when the song of a 12-year-old rapper was played. His cousin liked the song and challenged Blaqbonez to come up with his own lyrics, since he liked criticizing rappers. A few minutes later, he had enough bars for a verse, and that was where it all began. His parents were not in support of his newfound hobby, so he secretly pursued his passion. While in school, he dropped his first project, Hip-Hop in Blaq, and participated in competitions. In 2011, Blaqbonez started participating in underground rap battles. He eventually won Terry Tha Rapman's Zombie Competition in 2012 at the age of 16, beating 3000 rappers in the challenge. In the same year, he featured on Terry's 2012 mixtape titled “World Domination” alongside top Nigerian musicians including Olamide, Vector, Mode 9, and Spellz. Five years later, Blaqbonez featured Terry on one of his projects. He emerged first runner-up in Vector's King Kong competition, won the Rhythm fm Freestyle Fury and became RhythmFm's artiste of the month, became the Hennessy Vs class captain, part of the Soundcity blast cypher, also released his much talked about mixtape CTAT "Cssette Tapes and Tvs" grossing over 60,000 engagements in streams and downloads, which is his third mixtape, following "hip-hop in blaq" and the "unfinished EP".

In an interview with The Punch newspaper, he said his "Best Rapper in Africa" proclamation was a response to a diss track and need to wake up other rappers in Nigeria. He was recently described by The Guardian as 'carrying the torch of Nigerian rap' and on 2 January 2019, he was listed by the same publication as one of the "Top 10 Artists to watch in 2019". Blaqbonez was named West African Rapper Of The Year at the inaugural Creative-Africa Hip Hop Awards. The same publication ranked him second in their Top 50 African Rappers Of 2021 list.

=== 2018: Bad Boy Blaq ===
Blaqbonez released his eighth EP Bad Boy Blaq on 31 August 2018. It was released as part of the L.A.M.B project, a series of three hip hop albums that attempts to reawaken Nigerian hip hop. Bad Boy Blaq was executively produced by M.I Abaga and released through 100 Crowns, a label imprint of Chocolate City. The EP was the last of three releases and was preceded by M.I Abaga's A Study on Self Worth: Yxng Dxnzl (2018). A reissue of the EP, titled Bad Bloy Blaq Re-Up, was released in February 2019.

=== 2019: Mr. Boombastic ===
Blaqbonez released his ninth EP Mr. Boombastic on 25 October 2019. A day before the release of the EP, Blaqbonez released the promotional single "Jesus Is Black (Letter to Kanye West)". In it, he tells Kanye West to postpone the release of his ninth studio album Jesus Is King, which had the same release date as Mr. Boombastic.

In 2020, Blaqbonez released 'Haba'.

=== 2021: Sex Over Love ===
On 30 April 2021 Blaqbonez dropped his album Sex Over Love. The 14-track album houses previously released songs like "Bling" featuring Amaarae and Buju (BNXN), "BBC (Remix)" featuring Tiwa Savage and "Haba". Other artists featured on the album include Nasty C on "Heartbreaker", Joeboy on "Fendi", Bad Boy Timz and 1Da Banton on "Faaji", Laycon, Psycho YP and AQ on "Zombie" and Superboy Cheque on "Best Friend". On 17 September 2021, Blaqbonez dropped "1000 Years". On the song "1000 Years", the disk jockey DJ Yankee employed the rap flows of Chocolate City rapper Blaqbonez, alongside Penthauze Music act "Cheque" who enhanced the song with his rap flows, lyrics, and melody.

=== 2022: Young Preacher ===
On 28 October 2022, Blaqbonez released his 14-track studio album, Young Preacher. The album released was a follow-through of his anti-love crusade on 14 February that year and featured already-released track, Back in Uni which featured British-Ghanaian producer, Jae5 and was popular for its much talked about parody music video. Other features on the album are Lojay, Amaaare, Takura & Bien of Sauti Sol and Blxckie.

=== 2023: Emeka Must Shine ===
On 27 October 2023, Blaqbonez released his third studio album Emeka Must Shine consisting of 14 tracks and it was released under Chocolate City Music. The album is the follow up album of Young Preacher album. The album included guest appearances from indigenous artists such as Black Sherif, Jeriq, Victony, Odumodublvck, M24, Zlatan, Young Jonn and Ludacris.

2023: Like Ice Spice

On 8 July 2023, Blaqbonez released his two-packed singles Like Ice Spice, and Bezos. On the 16th headies award show held at Atlanta on 3 September 2023 he won in the category of the "Best rap album of the year".

== Discography ==
=== Studio albums ===
- Sex Over Love (2021)
- Young Preacher (2022)
- Emeka Must Shine (2023)
- No Excuses (2025)

=== EPs ===
- Bad Boy Blaq (2018)
- Bad Boy Blaq Re-Up (2019)
- Mr. Boombastic (2019)
- Of many colors: Orange (2024)

=== Singles ===
- "Mamiwota" feat. Oxlade (2019)
- "Shut Up" (2019)
- "Haba" (2020)
- "BBC" (2020)
- "BBC Remix" feat. Tiwa Savage (2021)
- "1000years" (2021)
- "Commander" (2022)
- "Go Home" (2022)
- "Back in Uni" feat. Jae5 (2022)
- "Stealth Freestyle"
- "Cinderella Girl" (Where You Dey) feat Ludacris
- "Like Bezos"
- "Like Ice Spice" (2023)
- "Nyem Ego (Cover)" feat. Lordmoon (2024)
- "Fire on Me" (2024)
- "Haibo Freestyle" (2024)
- "Louder" feat. Ayo Maff & Bella Shmurda
- "Follow Her" feat. Kizz Daniel (2025)
- "Go Crazy"(2025)
- "Consistency" feat. AJ Tracey (2025)
- "Chanel" feat. Asake (2026)
- "Ikebe 3000" feat. Asake (2026)

== See also ==
- Paperman (29 January 2022). "2021 Creative-Africa Hip Hop Awards Nominees And Winners | Creative-HipHop". www.creative-hiphop.com.
- Paperman (26 December 2021). "Top 50 African Rappers Of 2021 | Creative-HipHop". www.creative-hiphop.com.
