= Modola =

Nigerian singer-songwriter

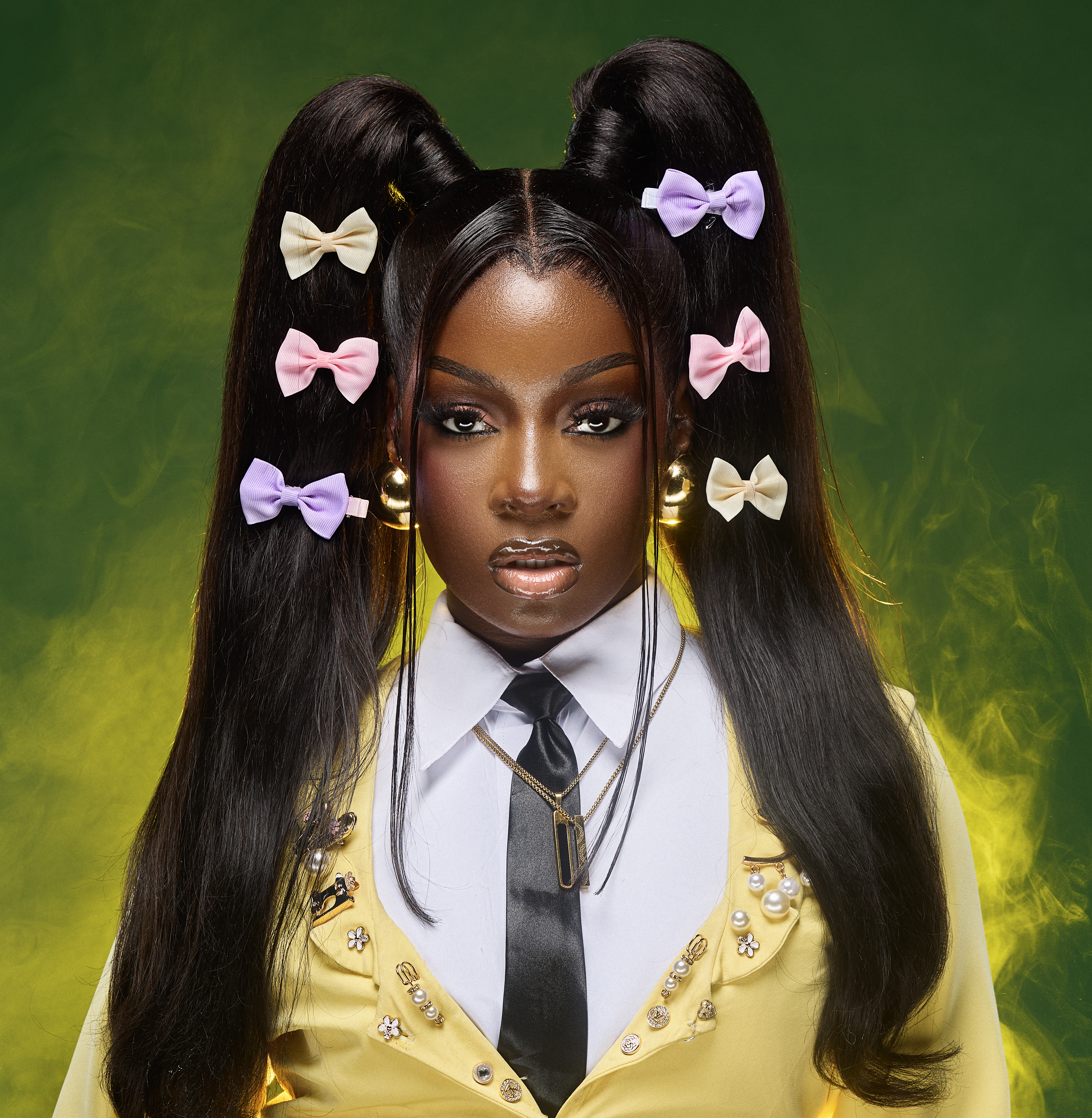
- Modola In 2026
- Born: Temidola Awosika; 17 April 2005 (age 21); Lagos, Nigeria
- Occupations: Singer; songwriter; dancer
- Years active: 2024–present
- Musical career
- Genres: Afrobeats; Afro fusion; Afro-pop
- Instrument: Vocals
- Label: PG Records Entertainment

Temidola Awosika (born 17 April 2005), known professionally as Modola (Italian pronunciation: [moˈdɔːla] stylised in all caps as MODOLA), is an Italian-based Nigerian singer-songwriter and dancer. She rose to prominence with the release of the song "Talk", which went viral online and peaked at number 59 on the TurnTable Top 100. In March 2025, she ranked number 7 on TurnTable 's NXT Emerging Top Artistes. She released her debut EP, New Light, in July 2025 under PG Records.

== Early life and education ==
Temidola Awosika was born on 17 April 2005 in Lagos State, Nigerian to a family of Yoruba descent, and grew up in Italy, where she studied Arts and Humanities and Social Sciences.

Awosika spent most of her childhood and teenage years in Milan, where her parents relocated when she was two. She first expressed interest in music and performance at a young age; while growing up, she frequently sang and danced at home and later became known among classmates for performing during school breaks.

In an interview with Natacha Akide, Awosika mentioned that she played badminton competitively as a teenager. She also noted that her parents did not support her decision to pursue a career in music after leaving sports. But her father later expressed conditional support after it became clear she intended to proceed with her plans. Awosika said that once she made up her mind about pursuing a music career, she took some time to watch performances and interviews of established artists through YouTube and other forms of social media. The artists who inspired her were Michael Jackson, Louis Armstrong, James Brown, and Aretha Franklin.

== Career ==
Modola began her music career in 2024, and that same year, she signed a deal with PG Records Entertainment. She gained recognition after the release of her 2025 single "Talk", which went viral on TikTok and debuted at number 59 on the Nigerian TurnTable 100 charts,on 27 March 2025, number 55 on Top Streaming Songs, accompanied by a music video. Modola also performed at the 2025 Royal Albert Hall concert alongside Diamond Platnumz and Tiwa Savage, held at the Royal Albert Hall in June 2025. On 28 March 2025, she ranked at number 7 on TurnTable's NXT Emerging Top Artistes. Emmanuel Daraloye praised the song's production, called it a fire-cracker single.

Modola released her debut extended play New Light On 31 July 2025 under PG Records. The six-song project included the singles "Billing" and "No Stress," of which reached number 47 on the Tanzania Music Chart. Reviewing for Premium Times, Friday Omosola described the ep as a balance of cohesion and versatility". In September 2025, during the United States Mission Grand Showcase Concert, Modola performed alongside Herlin Riley, Made Kuti, Yinka Davies, Jerry Omole, and Timi Dakolo. On 17 October 2025, she performed at the 2025 edition of Felabration, a yearly concert dedicated to Fela Kuti at the New Afrika Shrine. Modola embarked on "The New Light Tour" university tour on November 5, 2025, to promote her EP. She performed at the University of Abuja, Calabar, Ibadan and Yaba College of Technology in Lagos.

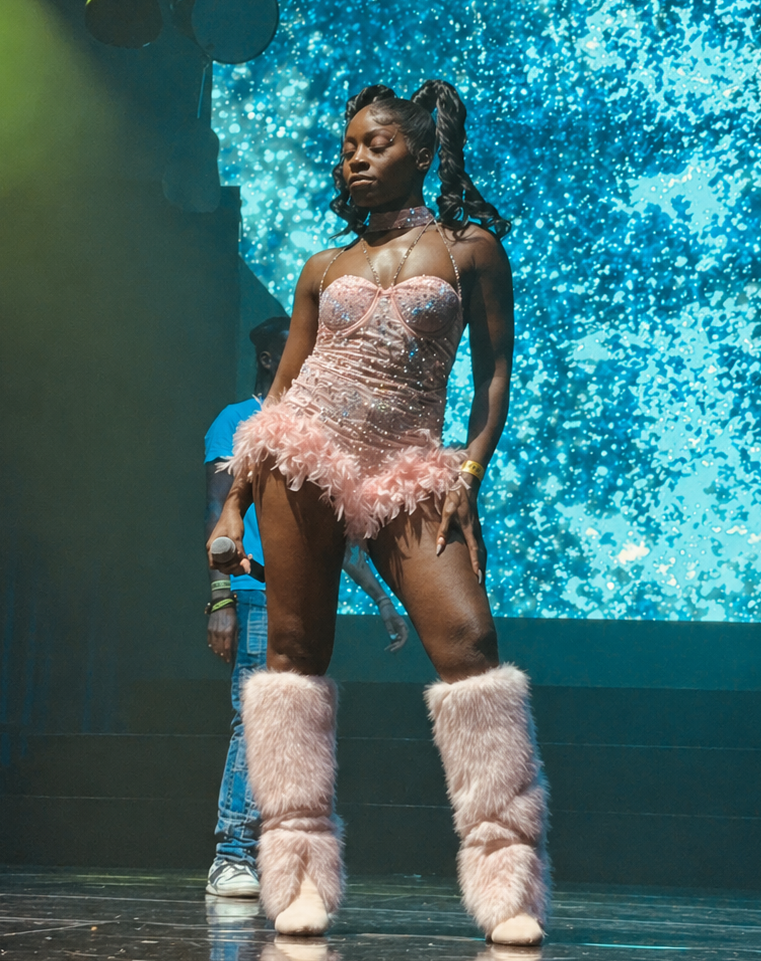
Modola performing at OVO Arena Wembley in 2025

On November 9, Modola headlined the Africa Celebrates Event in Ethiopia, becoming the first Nigerian Afrobeat artist to perform at the event. Broadcast live to audiences around the world in Addis Ababa. During the event, she also met Catherine Afeku. On November 23, she was brought on stage by Olamide to perform at the "Olamide Live in Concert" show in London, which drew over 12,500 attendees at the OVO Arena Wembley. She performed alongside Asake, Fireboy, Joeboy, Seyi Vibez, and Darkoo. In December 2025, she was included on the Boomplay list of "So Young, So Hot" artists.

On April 10, 2026, Modola featured Nigerian singer-songwriter BhadBoi OML on the single "Kupe". The release followed an earlier announcement in March 2026, when a teaser circulated on social media and prompted a TikTok trend with participation from public figures including Funke Akindele. The song received positive reviews and peaked at number twenty-two on the TurnTable 100 charts, number seven on Nigeria Top Radio songs (TurnTable) (Note: "Kupe" also peaked at number 1 on the Nigeria Airplay chart (Soundcharts).) On May 2, 2026, Modola entered at number forty-four on the TurnTable Official Artiste Top 100. (Note: In May 2026, she ranked number 1 on TurnTable's NXT Emerging Top Artistes.)

On 20 May 2026, Modola began the "Modola Takes Ghana" media tour, during which she performed her song through appearances on various Ghanaian television programmes and interviews, including broadcasts on Joy Prime TV, MX24 TV, Hitz FM and 3Music TV. During the tour, she performed a handstand bridge at Black Star Square in Accra.

== Artistry and personal life ==
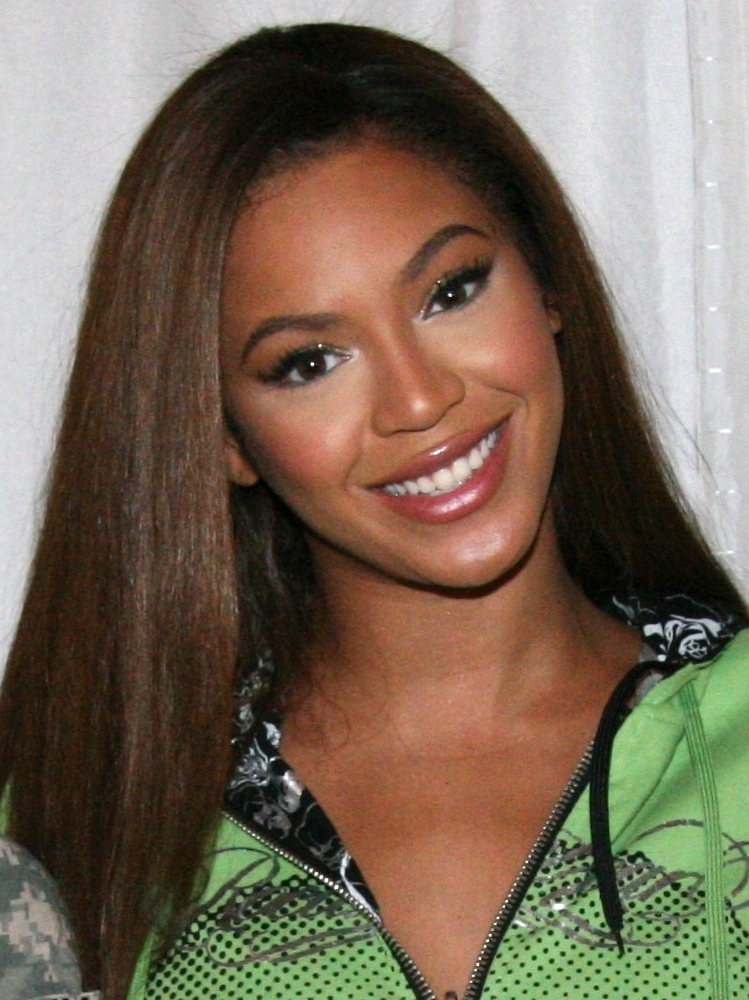
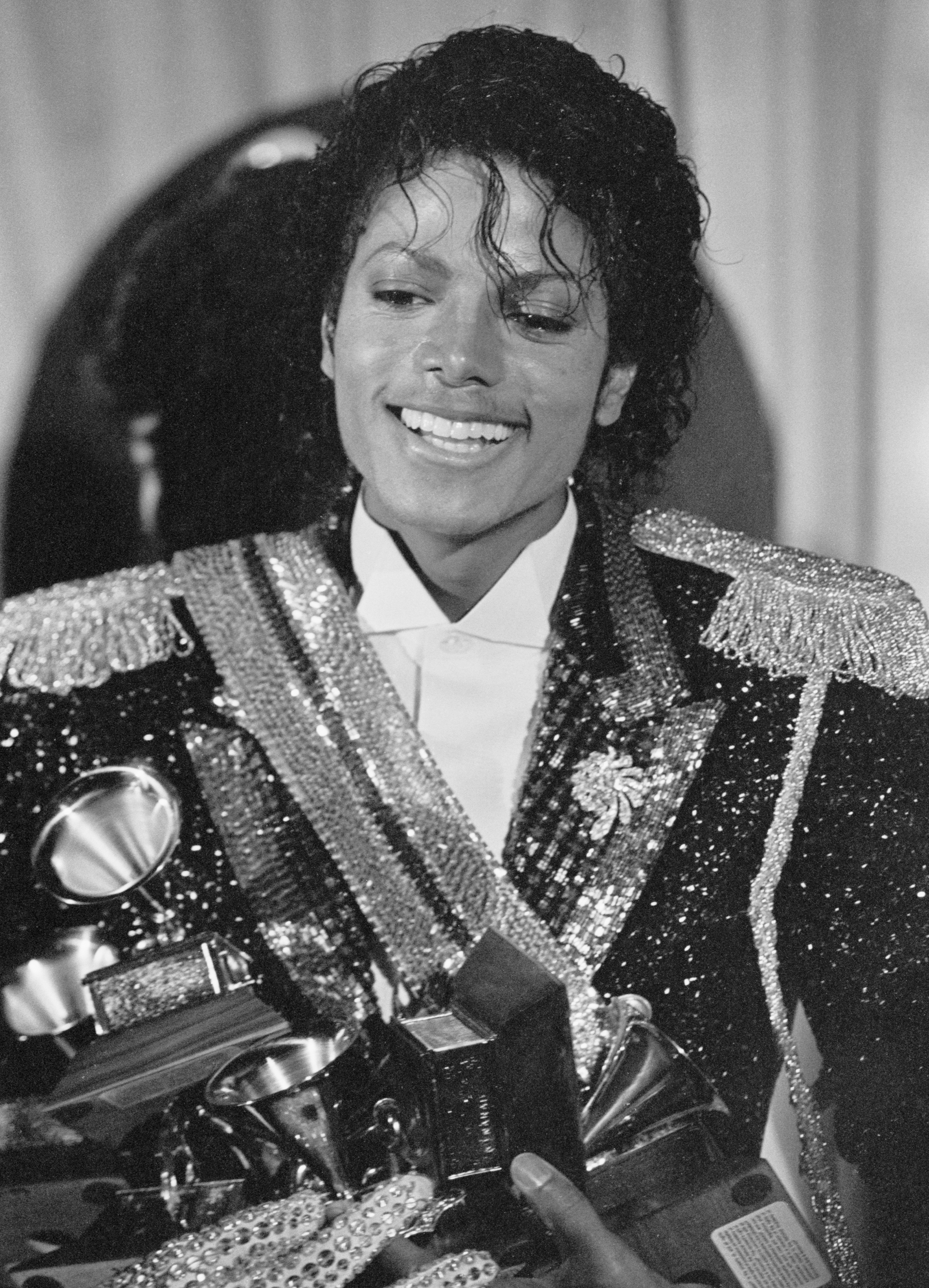
Modola's major influences include Beyoncé (left) and Michael Jackson (right).

Modola songs are a fusion of Afrobeats, with multilingual features and influences derived from African music and modern musical trends. She has named artists such as Beyoncé, Michael Jackson, Rihanna, and early African musicians as major influences. Her songwriting process usually starts with an instrumental tune, with the lyrics and melodies being formed subsequently, often through producer collaboration. Following her relocation to Nigeria, Modola was introduced to various types of music that influenced her.

Modola has also mentioned that she has been following a vegan diet throughout her life. During later interviews, Modola referred to Nigerian singer Olamide as one of her favorite performers. She stated that she admired his work, with Olamide publicly acknowledged her on occasion, including inviting her on stage during live performances. She is also a fan of Don Jazzy.

== Discography ==
=== Extended play ===
List of EPs
Title	Music Details	Year released
New Light	Released: 31 July 2025; Number of Tracks: 6; Label: PG Records; Formats: Streaming, digital download	2025

=== Singles ===
==== As lead artist ====
List of singles as lead artist, with selected chart positions, showing year released and album name
Title	Year	Peak chart positions			Album
Title	Year	US	NGR	NG Afro	Album
"Talk"	2025	—	59	46	TBA
"No Stress" (Note: "No Stress" did not enter the TurnTable Top 100, but peaked at number 47 on the Boomplay Tanzania Music Chart.)	2025	—	—	—	New Light
"Billing"	2025	—	—	—	New Light
"Kupe" (featuring BhadBoi OML) (Note: "Kupe" also entered the TurnTable Top Radio songs, peaked at number 7 on Top 100 Radio songs .)	2026	—	11	—	TBA
"—" denotes a recording that did not chart or was not released in that territory.

== Awards and nominations ==
Year	Award	Category	Result	Ref
2026	Golden Star Awards	Next rated artist of the year	Won	(Note: As announced on Instagram "And the winner is @sheismodola #goldenstarsaward2026 #goldenstarsaward #goldenstarsaward6 #golde stars award 6")

== Tours and concert ==
Headlining

- New Light Tour (2025)
- Modola Takes Ghana (2026)

Supporting

- Diamond Platnumz Tour (2025)
- Olamide Live In Concert (2025)
- Soundcity TV University Tour (2026)
