= New Light (Modola EP) =

EP by Modola
- Released: 31 July 2025
- Recorded: 2024–2025
- Genres: Afropop, Afro-fusion, soul
- Length: 14:00
- Labels: PG Records Entertainment; Base World
- Producers: Niphkeys; Bola BMH; Mansa Jabulani; Oodun; Skitter

New Light is the debut extended play by Nigerian singer-songwriter Modola. Released on 31 July 2025, by Baseworld and PG Records, the EP was produced by Niphkeys, Bola BMH, Mansa Jabulani, Oodun, and Skitter. It was conceived as a 6-track Project exploring Afro-fusion, Afropop/Afrobeats, Soul & R&B, Alté and Amapiano & Electronic Elements styles with no features.

New Light generally received positive reviews, with critics praising its strong production and theme.

== Background and release ==
Upon returning to Nigeria in April 2023, following the release of "Talk" as the lead single, Modola signed her first recording contract with Base World and PG Records Entertainment and began work on New Light. The EP was produced by Niphkeys, Bola BMH, Mansa Jabulani, Oodun, and Skitter, and comprises six songs. On the EP, Modola noted.

This EP is my love letter to every young woman who refuses to be boxed in, Whether it's the grind of "Masun" or the freedom of "No Stress", I want my music to remind you.....your light doesn't need permission to shine.

— Modola on the ep, The Lagos Review

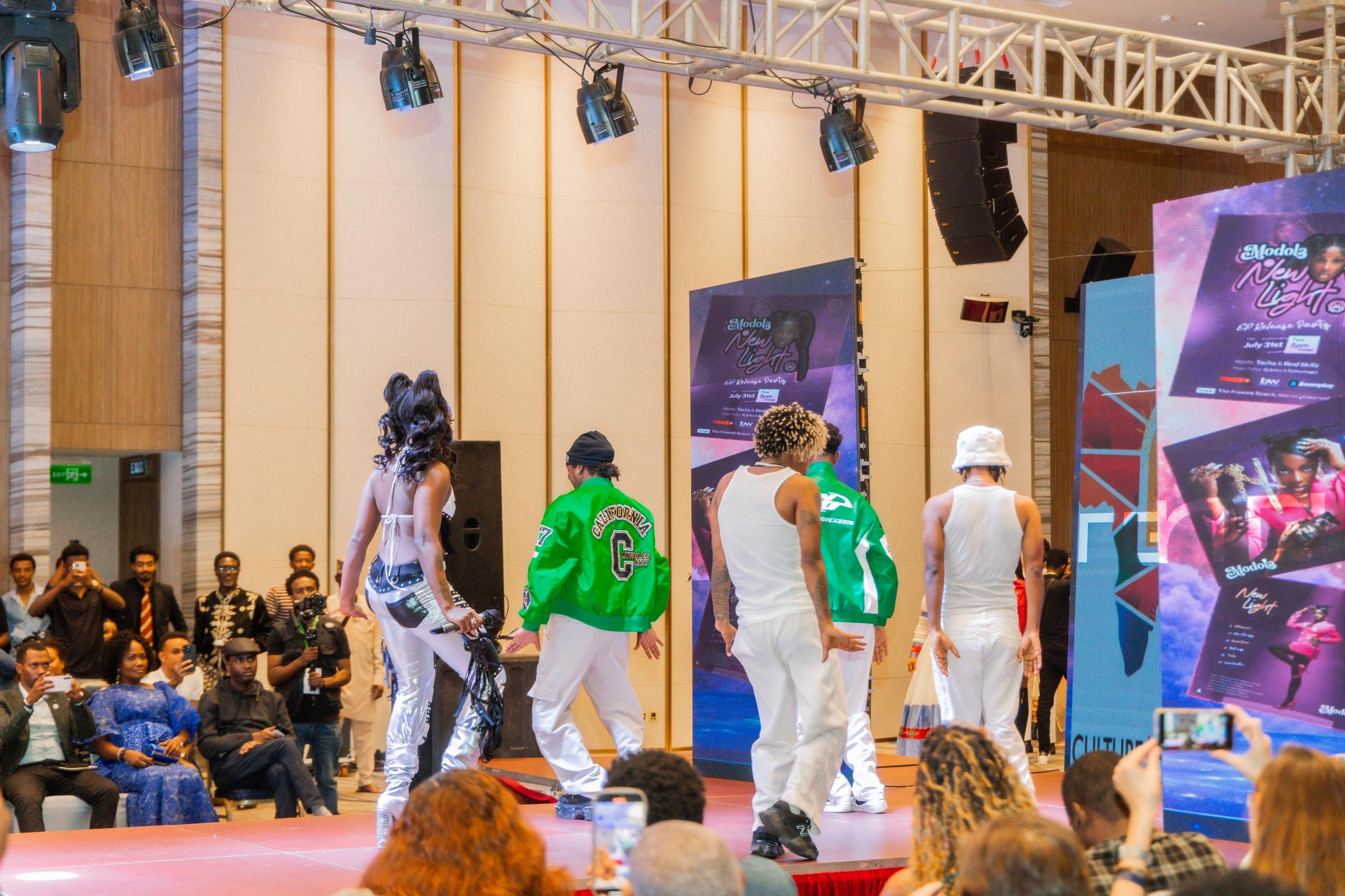
Modola performing No Stress in Addis Ababa Ethiopia 2025

New Light was released on 31 July 2025 through PG Records and Base World. To promote the EP, Modola performed select tracks at live events, including Felabration 2025 at the New Afrika Shrine in Lagos. "New Light" received airplay on national radio stations like Soundcity FM, The Beat 99.9 FM, Urban Radio, Trace Africa, and Cool FM. On 9 November, Modola headlined the Africa Celebrates event in Addis Ababa Ethiopia, becoming the first Nigerian Afrobeats artist to perform at the event.

== Reception ==
In a review for This Day, Emmanuel Esomnofu described the EP as "contemplative and fearlessly defiant", praising its emotional clarity and Modola's ability to balance vulnerability with confidence. Similarly, The Guardian described the EP "a magical and experiential 14-minute journey", commending Modola's multilingual transitions and her "blend of European finesse with distinctly Nigerian storytelling". Toni Kan of The Lagos Review praised New Light for its "tight sequencing and replay value," arguing that the EP shows "remarkable discipline," with no track feeling like filler. Music critic Emmanuel Daraloye of New Telegraph praised how Modola draws from both her Nigerian roots and international influences, noting that her lyrics in English, Yoruba, and Italian give the EP a distinctive cross-cultural feel. He added that New Light showcases her artistic vision. The EP reached number 9 on the Nigeria Boomplay charts for the months of August and September, including the tracks "Billing" and "No Stress", which reached numbers 47 and 56 on the Tanzania Boomplay Chart. The album had accumulated over 2 million streams by 11 August 2025.

=== Accolades ===
Publication	Accolade	Rank	Ref.
The Guardian	Albums that defined the year 2025	—N/a	

== Track listing ==
New Light track listing
No.	Title	Writer(s)	Producer(s)	Length
1.	"Talk"	Temidola Awosika	Skitter	2:05
2.	"Masun"	Temidola Awosika	Niphkeys	2:32
3.	"Oro Owo"	Temidola Awosika	Mansa Jabulani	2:25
4.	"Billing"	Temidola Awosika	Oodun	2:12
5.	"No Stress"	Temidola Awosika	Bola BMH	2:18
6.	"Kontrolla"	Temidola Awosika	Skitter	2:28
Total length:				14:00

== Release history ==
Release history and formats for New Light
Region	Date	Format	Label
Various	31 July 2025	Streaming; digital download	PG Records; Base World
