= Kupe (song) =

2026 single by Modola featuring Bhadboi OML

Single by Modola featuring BhadBoi OML
- Written: 2026
- Released: 10 April 2026
- Recorded: 2026
- Genre: Techno-soukous; Afro fusion
- Length: 2:14
- Label: Base World Global; PG Records
- Songwriters: Temidola Awosika; Akinyinka Kuham Oladimeji
- Producer: Oodun

Modola singles chronology
"No Stress" (2025)	"Kupe" (2026)

"Kupe" is a song by Italian-based Nigerian singer-songwriter Modola, featuring Bhadboi OML, released on April 10, 2026, through PG Records under exclusive license to Base World Global. The song received mixed reviews from music critics. Commercially it charted on the TurnTable Top 100, Nigeria Top 200 Shazam chart, and Nigeria Top Radio songs charts.

== Background and composition ==
Following the release of her ep New Light (2025) and its single "Talk", Modola announced the Single on March 26, 2026 confirming Bhadboi OML as a featured artist. Prior to its official release, Modola shared preview of the song on social media. The track later gained attention on TikTok through the #KupeBottleChallenge hashtag, which featured videos by public figures including Funke Akindele, and Mercy Johnson among other users.

"Kupe" was written by Modola and Akinyinka Kuham. It was produced by Oodun and STG mixed and mastered it. Lyrically, the song focuses on themes of self-worth and body-positive power in her performance. delivered primarily in Yoruba, French, Pidgin, and English. According to Sean Musa Carter of Celeb Patrol UG, the songwriting is built around confidence and chemistry. Set in E minor over a tempo of 117 beats per minute, "Kupe" runs two minutes and thirteen seconds. The song has been described as an Afropop, Techno-soukous, and Afro fusion record, a combination that, while experimental in composition, remains accessible in execution.

== Promotion and release ==
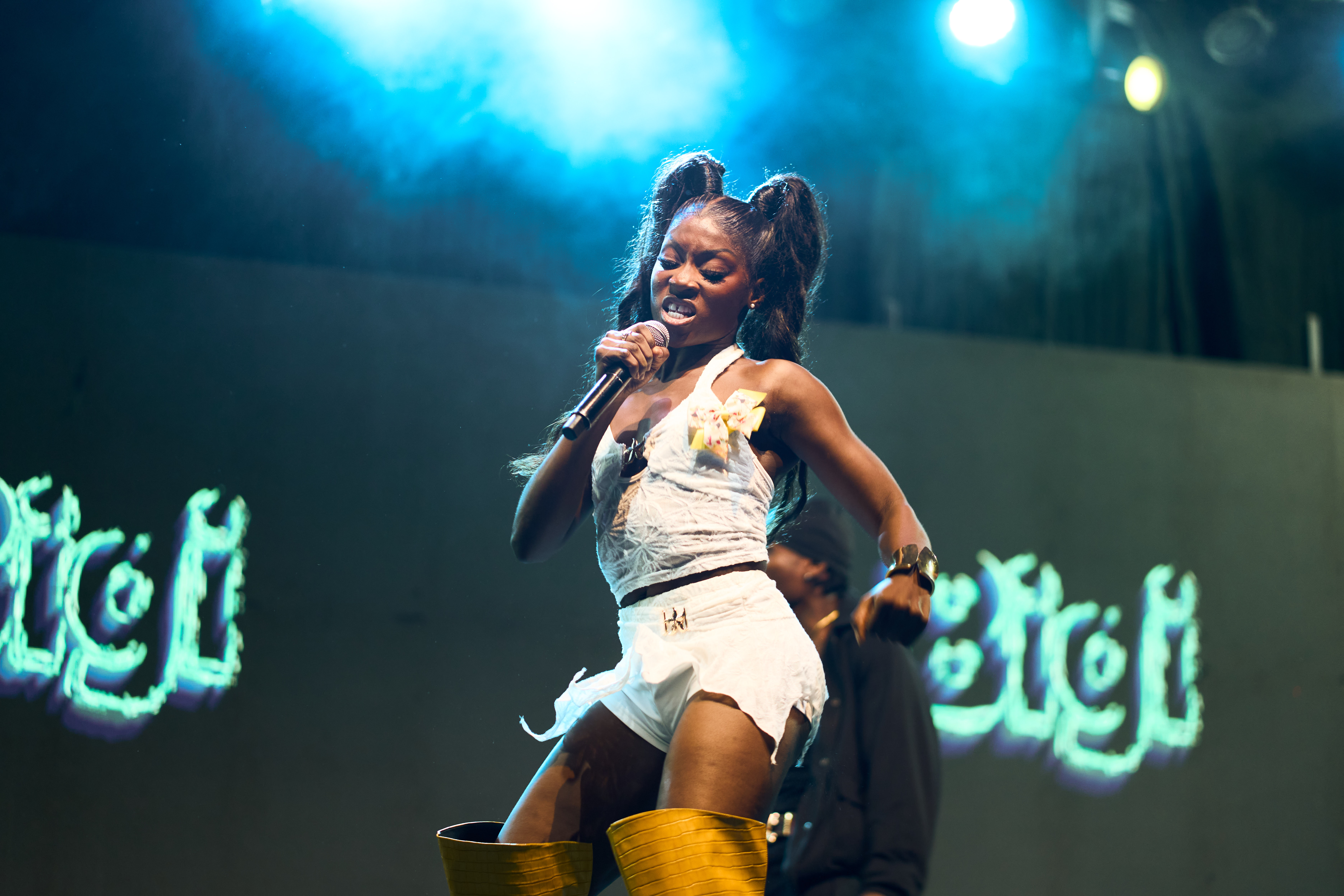
Modola performed "Kupe" at Soundcity Tv 2026 Tour

On 10 April 2026, Modola released "Kupe" to digital music stores and streaming services under exclusive license to Base World Global. The following month Modola began the "Modola Takes Ghana" media tour, during which she performed "kupe" through appearances on various Ghanaian television programmes and interviews, including broadcasts on Joy Prime TV, MX24 TV, Hitz FM and 3Music TV. On June 25, 2026, she performed "Kupe" during the Soundcity Tv On Tour stop at the University of Lagos.

== Commercial performance ==
Following its release on 10 April 2026, "Kupe" debuted at number five on the Nigeria Top 200 Shazam chart, and later reached number eight on the Boomplay Africa chart, while also charting in several East African countries, including Uganda, Tanzania, and Rwanda. On 23 April 2026, "Kupe" entered the TurnTable Top 100 charts at number twenty-two. And also debuted at number seven on the (TurnTable) Nigeria Top Radio Songs chart, It reached number one on the Nigeria Airplay chart. The song reached number fourteen the following week on the TurnTable Top 100 chart, and number 4 on the TurnTable Nigeria Top Radio Songs chart., where it stayed for three weeks. Over its eight-week run on the chart, the song climbed to number eleven.

== Critical reception ==
Professional ratings
Review scores
Source	Rating
Independent (Nigeria)	3.5/5
Daily Trust	4/5

"Kupe" received positive reviews from music critics. Abisola Shojobi of Independent wrote that the song is not, as promotional claims suggest, a "masterpiece", but rather a competent, well-produced Afropop single. He concluded that "Kupe" seems far more interested in being a vibe than in saying anything. Which is fine, in theory. And rated the song 3/5. Daily Trust Review praised the production of the song, calling "Kupe" almost too polished. In their review of Kupe, This Day praised the song fusion of the Afrobeats and the European touch added in the song, noting how Modola performed in multiple languages. In addition. It also described the second verse by BhadBoi OML in Yoruba language but felt that his verse was too short. And stated that, though the song was excellently produced it did not fulfill its musical potential.

== Credits and personnel ==
- Temidola Awosika – Vocals, songwriting
- Akinyinka Kuham – Vocals, songwriting
- Oodun – Production
- STG– Mixing engineer

== Charts ==
Chart performance for "Kupe"
Chart (2026)	Peak position
Nigeria Top 100 (TurnTable)	11
Official Radio Songs (TurnTable) (Note: "Kupe" moved to number 3 on the 6th week of release at TurnTable Top Radio songs.)	3
TooXclusive Top 100 chart (TooXclusive)	63

== Release history ==
Release history and formats for "Kupe"
Region	Date	Format	Label	Ref.
Various	10 April 2026	Digital download; streaming	PG Records; Base World Global	
