= Newen Afrobeat =

Chilean Afrobeat band

- Origin: Chile
- Genres: Afrobeat
- Years active: 2009–present
- Members: Ángel Marín, Álvaro Quintas, Cristóbal Dahm, Aldo Gómez, Marcelo Morales, Martin Concha (guitar), Fernando Carvacho, Ivania Arteaga (backup vocals) María Francisca "Fran Ri" Riquelme (vocals), Roberto "Tito" Gevert (drums), Klaus Brantmayer (Alto sax/flute), Sebastian "Seba" Crooker (guitar), Álvaro Villalobos, Macarena "Maca" Rozic, Tino Canessa, Alejandro Orellana (percussion), Tomás "Tom" Pavez, Francisca Castro (Percussion), Mauricio "Mauro" Sanchez, Benjamin Astroza (bass), Vicente Aravena (Tenor sax), Sergio Quijada (trumpets)
- Past members: Nicholas Urbina, Enrique Camhi, Camila Fuentes

Newen Afrobeat is an Afrobeat band that started in 2009 in Chile. Newen Afrobeat revisits Fela Kuti's musical heritage. The word Newén means 'strength' in the Mapuche language. Newen Afrobeat rely on the group setting and evolves through the lenses of collaborations in the creative music process.

== History ==
Newen Afrobeat was founded in 2009 by the Chilean composer, and singer Nicholás Urbina, known as Nicolás Libertad. He was inspired and grew up listening to American rap, R&B, Chilean Rap and funk for the groove. After listening to Fela's song, "Water no Get Enemy" he wanted to compose music of his own and convinced some of his friends from college to make a band. Together they composed the music for the first, eponymous, album released in 2013. The intro of the first song Santiago incorporates parts of José Mujica's speech originally delivered in front of the 2013 UN General Assembly. The album is considered to be the first Chilean Afrobeat ever made and the style of the album is groovy almost psychedelic.

The band started as a group and utilized the model of the bedroom producer, partaking in jam sessions. Together, the group members enjoyed the same genre of music mainly unknown in Chile, jammed and found their groove to help spread this genre to more Chileans. The band holds a strong emphasis on carving out their own path yet staying honest and authentic. The creative process of their music spans from sheet music to jam sessions when it comes to creating their pieces. They look at many diverse models and new perspectives, with an emphasis on context dependent. There has been many changes in the band such as the departure of the lead singer Urbina and the changing of instrumentalists.

Urbina relocated to the United States in the mid-2010s. The group's last concert with Urbina was at the Felabration Festival in Lagos in 2016 (founded by Yeni Kuti in 1998).

The group has had several collaborations with other bands and composers such as Kologbo of Fela Kuti's band, Africa 70 in 2015, which was a heavy influence on the Newen Afrobeat style. They collaborated at the first Felabration in Nigeria and had an influence back in Chile helping Newen Afrobeat work on their second album; Curiche.

Without Urbina the group continued after various member changes and reformed into a collective releasing the EP Newen Plays Fela in 2017. This album includes features from Seun Kuti, Cheick Tidane Seck as well as some Egypt 80 members, Seun Kuti's band as well as Fela Kuti's youngest son. Newen Afrobeat covers Upside Down and Opposite People in this EP.

A third album, Curiche (a Mapuchian word meaning 'black person'), was released in February 2019. This was the band's first album after the departure of Urbina. This is a more energetic album and discusses themes of inequality, migration, the role of females and indigenous culture and is a described as extremely energetic. This is one of the few Afrobeat bands to be fronted by women as they are often fronted by male vocalists since the time of Fela.

The EP Newen Plays Fela Vol. II was released October 22, 2021.Where they covered two of Fela's biggest hits including "Coffin for Head of State" and "Zombie". The cover of the album depicts a zombie-like military leader as people who look zombified are reaching for him in the back, with coffins on the bottom right corner alluding to the two songs in the EP.

In March 29, 2024, Newen Afrobeat released the EP GRIETAS. Grietas included collaborations when the band traveled to the United Kingdom, and worked with Dele Sosimi on the album Greitas. Greitas which refers to the word cracks, is their newest and fifth album and incorporates other icons such as Lido Pimienta, Chico Cesar, and Joe Vasconcellos. The albums delves into themes of rupture and "cracks" with life and death and the interconnections of diverse cultures. Recently in 2025, Newen Afrobeat performed at the Glastonbury Festival and went on a European tour.

== Style ==
Their style finds its inspiration in the Nigerian Afrobeat of Fela Kuti and their repertoire includes a number of Kuti's titles. Their music is also influenced by the aboriginal roots of their own country. Their songs celebrate the environment, indigenous rights, women's empowerment, and multiculturalism. Newen Afrobeat's live performances are also demonstrations in support of the Mapuche cause. The band evolves with their fifth album as they delve into a modern sound of jazz, electronic, funk, rock and soul.

The group collaborates with other bands, and running on a creative mindset process. The group has evolved their sound as they cycle through and gain new members. They also make cover of other Afrobeat songs in their albums, and LPs. The group evolves from the funk from Fela Kuti, mixing with, and taking sounds from the native Andean, and Mapuche style as well as incorporating electronic as the years go on.

== Discography ==
=== Albums ===
Newen Afrobeat (2014)
Track Number	Title
1	Santiago
2	Caminante
3	Rojo Carmín
4	Polvo de Inti
5	P.D.T.N (Prostituto de Transnacional)
6	Nación Nueva
7	Qué Sabemos

Newen Plays Fela (EP) (2017)
Track Number	Title
1	Upside Down
2	Opposite People Intro
3	Opposite People

Curiche (2019)
Track Number	Title
1	Vuela Junto a Mí
2	Curiche
3	Voráz
4	Cántaros
5	Open Your Eyes
6	Chaltumay
7	Come y Calla

Newen Plays Fela Vol. II (EP) (2021)
Track Number	Title
1	Coffin for Head of State
2	Zombie

GRIETAS (EP) (2024)
Track Number	Title
1	Grietas
2	Mare Mare
3	Lloverá
4	Somos el Presente
5	Widin
6	Es la vida

Live At Liverpool aka Liverpool Session (EP) (2025)
Track Number	Title
1	Es la vida
2	Ako
3	Grietas
4	No agreement

=== Singles ===
- Chaltumay (2018)
- Open Your Eyes feat. Oghene Kologbo (2019)
- Cántaros (2019)
- No Les Creeré (2020)
- Somos el presente (feat. Joe Vasconcellos) (2023)
- Mare Mare (feat. Dele Sosimi) (2023)
- Grietas (feat. Lido Pimienta) (2023)
- Es la vida (feat. Chico Cesar) (2024)

== See also ==
- Seun Kuti
- Cheick Tidiane Seck
- Lemi Ghariokwu
