= Mamadou Diabaté (Burkinabe musician) =

- Mamadou Diabaté at Richmond Folk Festival in 2026

Background information
- Born: 1973 (age 52–53); Ouagadougou, Burkina Faso
- Occupations: Musician, composer
- Instruments: Balafon, percussion
- Website: www.mamadoudiabate.com

Mamadou Diabaté (born 1973) is a Burkinabe musician mostly known for his balafon playing. He lives in Vienna, Austria and has toured internationally with his ensemble Mamadou Diabaté & Percussion Mania.

== Life and work ==
Diabaté was born in 1973 into a jeli musician family in southwest Burkina Faso. At five years old, he began musical training with his father Penegue Diabaté, who was known for his balafon playing throughout his Sambla-speaking home region and elsewhere in Burkina Faso. Three years later, he began apprenticeships with other regionally renowned balafon players. At the age of 11, he moved from his home village to Bobo-Dioulasso, where he honed his balafon playing and learned other percussion instruments including the talking drum and djembe. Three years later Diabaté began playing with his father in an ensemble that received first prize at the arts competition of the 1988 National Culture Week of Burkina Faso in Koudougou and Reo. In 1998, he won the prize again in Bobo-Dioulasso as a founding member of the traditional music ensemble Landaya.

In 2000 Diabaté moved to Vienna, Austria, where he recorded and released his first album Sababu Man Dogo (2001) on the label Extraplatte. In 2002, he released on the same label the solo album Keneya, the first publicly issued disc to feature traditional Sambla balafon music. This music is notable for its complex speech surrogate system, where the words of the Sambla language are translated into music in a similar fashion to the more famous case of talking drum communication. Ensuing projects included several collaborations, including Mutua (2012) with jazz saxophonist Wolfgang Puschnig, The Snow Owl: Normas (2014) with Juan García-Herreros, and Masaba Kan (2014) with Cheick Tidiane Seck and kora player Toumani Diabaté as guest artists.

Since 2006, Diabaté has toured with his group Mamadou Diabaté & Percussion Mania, sharing the featured role with his cousin and fellow balafonist Yacouba Konate. Their album Kanuya (2011) won the 2011 Austrian World Music Award. In 2012, the group won the "Balafon d'or" at the Triangle du balafon festival in Sikasso, Mali.

Diabaté has led and collaborated in presentations of the Sambla balafon tradition internationally, including classes and workshops at Victoria University and Dartmouth College as well as lectures at Princeton University, University of Delaware, and Brandeis University.

In 2016, he was made Knight of the National Order of Burkina Faso for his role in promoting Burkinabe art and culture internationally.

In 2009, Diabaté founded Sababu, a non-profit primary school in Bobo-Dioulasso, and is chairman of the school's associated non-profit organization.

== Critical Appraisal ==
Bastiaan Springer wrote in the Afropop Worldwide:"When Diabaté is on stage playing the balafon, something magical happens between him and the audience. With his tight strokes, he makes the audience move. When this 46-year-old Burkinabe virtuoso is on fire and plays as fast as he can—which is really fast—the audience stands up and starts dancing. At the end of the show everybody is dancing like mad."

== Discography ==
Diabaté has appeared on the following albums:

Album	Year
Sababu Man Dogo	2001
Keneya	2002 (reissued 2019)
Sira Fila	2003
Folikelaw	2005
Kamalenya	2008
Sambla Fadenya: The Art of Sadama Diabate	2009
Tusia Fadenya: The Art of Daouda Diabate	2009
Yala	2010
Fenba	2010 (reissued 2019)
Kanuya	2011
Mutua	2012
The Snow Owl: Normas	2013
Masaba Kan	2014
Barokan	2015
Douba Foli: Noir et Blanc	2016
Nakan	2019
Seengwa	2021

== See also ==
- Music of Burkina Faso
- Balafon
- Talking drum
