= Talk (Modola song) =

Single by Modola

from the EP New Light
- Released: February 21, 2025
- Genre: Afro pop
- Length: 2:30
- Label: PG Records; Base World
- Songwriter: Temidola Awosika
- Producer: Skitter

"Talk" is a single by Italian-based Nigerian singer and songwriter Modola, It was released on 21 February 2025 through PG Records. "Talk" peaked at number 46 on TurnTable charts Top Afro-Pop Songs and number 59 on TurnTable Top 100. It serves as the lead single from her debut extended play New Light.

== Background ==
In 2024, Modola secured a recording contract with PG Records, After a TikTok freestyle, in 2025 Modola unveil the single.

== Music video ==
The song's accompanying music video premiered on April 11, 2025, on Modola's Vevo account on YouTube and was directed by Olisa Mani. The video opens with a magazine cover of Modola, with the Title who is Modola.

== Critical reception and live performances ==
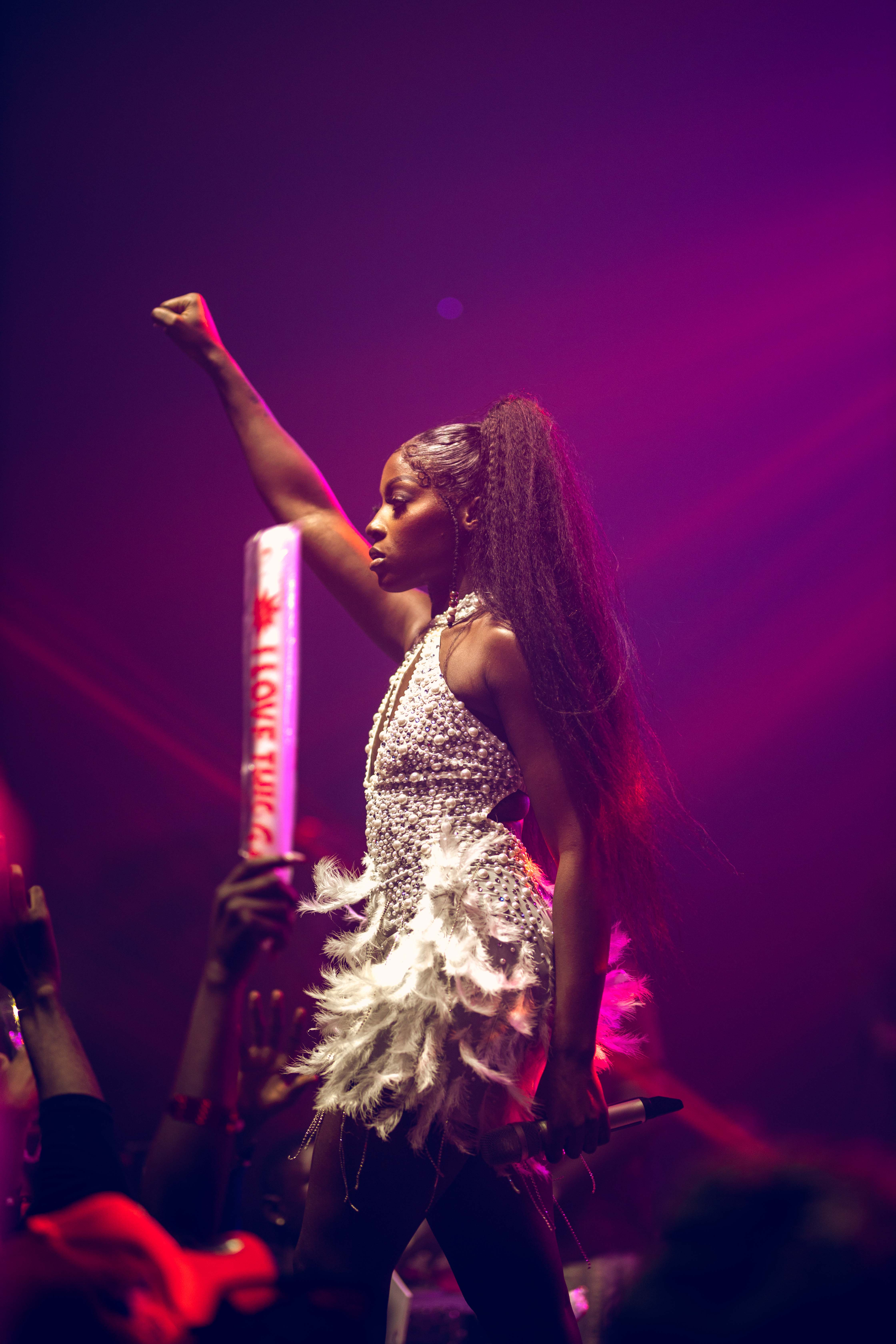
Modola (pictured in 2025) performing "Talk".

Talk received generally positive reviews from music critics. Writing for Vanguard, Emmanuel Daraloye praised the song's production, called it a fire-cracker single review saying "The vocals and sounds surely does have a reconnect to memory as though it’s something you have heard or can sing along while you listen." In June 2025, Modola performed "Talk" at a concert by Diamond Platnumz; the event was held at the Royal Albert Hall.

== Credits and personnel ==
Credits adapted from Apple Music.

Personnel

- Temidola Awosika – Vocals, Lyrics, Composer
- Isreal (Skitter) Elisha – Producer
- Bolatito Obisanya – Co-Producer
- Marqai – Mixing Engineer, Mastering Engineer, Recording Engineer

== Charts ==
=== Weekly charts ===
Weekly Chart performance for "Talk"
| Chart (2025) | Peak position |
|---|---|
| Nigeria (TurnTable Top 100) | 59 |
| Top Afro-Pop Songs (TurnTable) | 46 |
| Official Streaming Songs (TurnTable) | 55 |
