= Cheick Tidiane Seck =

Malian musician and composer

- Birth name: Cheick Amadou Tidiane Seck
- Born: December 11, 1953; Ségou, Mali
- Origin: Bamako, Mali
- Genres: African music Jazz; South African jazz
- Occupation(s): Musician, arranger, composer
- Instrument(s): Keyboards; Vocals
- Years active: Early 1970s – present
- Labels: Universal Jazz France, Because Music

Cheick Tidiane Seck (born December 11, 1953) is a Malian musician, arranger and composer. He has written for and played with African artists including Fela Kuti, Mory Kanté, Salif Keita, Youssou N'Dour and for jazz bands (Hank Jones, Dee Dee Bridgewater). He has also collaborated with musicians Damon Albarn (Blur, Gorillaz, Rocket Juice & the Moon) and Mamadou Diabate (Masaba Kan).

== Discography ==
- Sarala (Verve, 1995) with jazz pianist Hank Jones
- MandinGroove (2003)
- Sabaly (2008)
- Guerrier (2013)
- Timbuktu - The Music of Randy Weston (2018)

== See also ==
- Newen Afrobeat
