= Yeni Kuti =

Nigerian dancer and singer (born 1961)

- Born: Omoyeni Anikulapo-Kuti; 24 May 1961 (age 65); England
- Education: Nigerian Institute of Journalism
- Occupations: Dancer; singer; business woman
- Notable work: Felabration, TV Presenter at TVC, MD of New Afrika Shrine
- Parent: Fela Kuti (father)
- Relatives: Femi Kuti (brother); Seun Kuti (brother)

Ọmọ́yẹni "Yeni" Aníkúlápó Kútì (also known as YK, born 24 May 1961, England, United Kingdom) is a British-born Nigerian dancer and singer.

== Family ==
She is a descendant of the Ransome-Kuti family. Her grandmother was Nigerian women's rights activist Funmilayo Ransome-Kuti. Anikulapo-Kuti pioneered the idea of Felabration, a music festival conceived to celebrate the life and contributions of her late father Fela Kuti to the Nigerian society.

== Biography ==
Born in England, Anikulapo-Kuti was born as the first child to afrobeat pioneer Fela Kuti and to a British mother. She completed her basic and secondary education in Nigeria after leaving the United Kingdom at the age of two. She holds a diploma in journalism after she graduated from the Nigerian Institute of Journalism. In 1986, she joined Femi's band as a singer and dancer after dropping her job as a fashion designer. She currently serves as a co-manager of the New Afrika Shrine alongside her brother Femi Kuti.
