= Ipele =

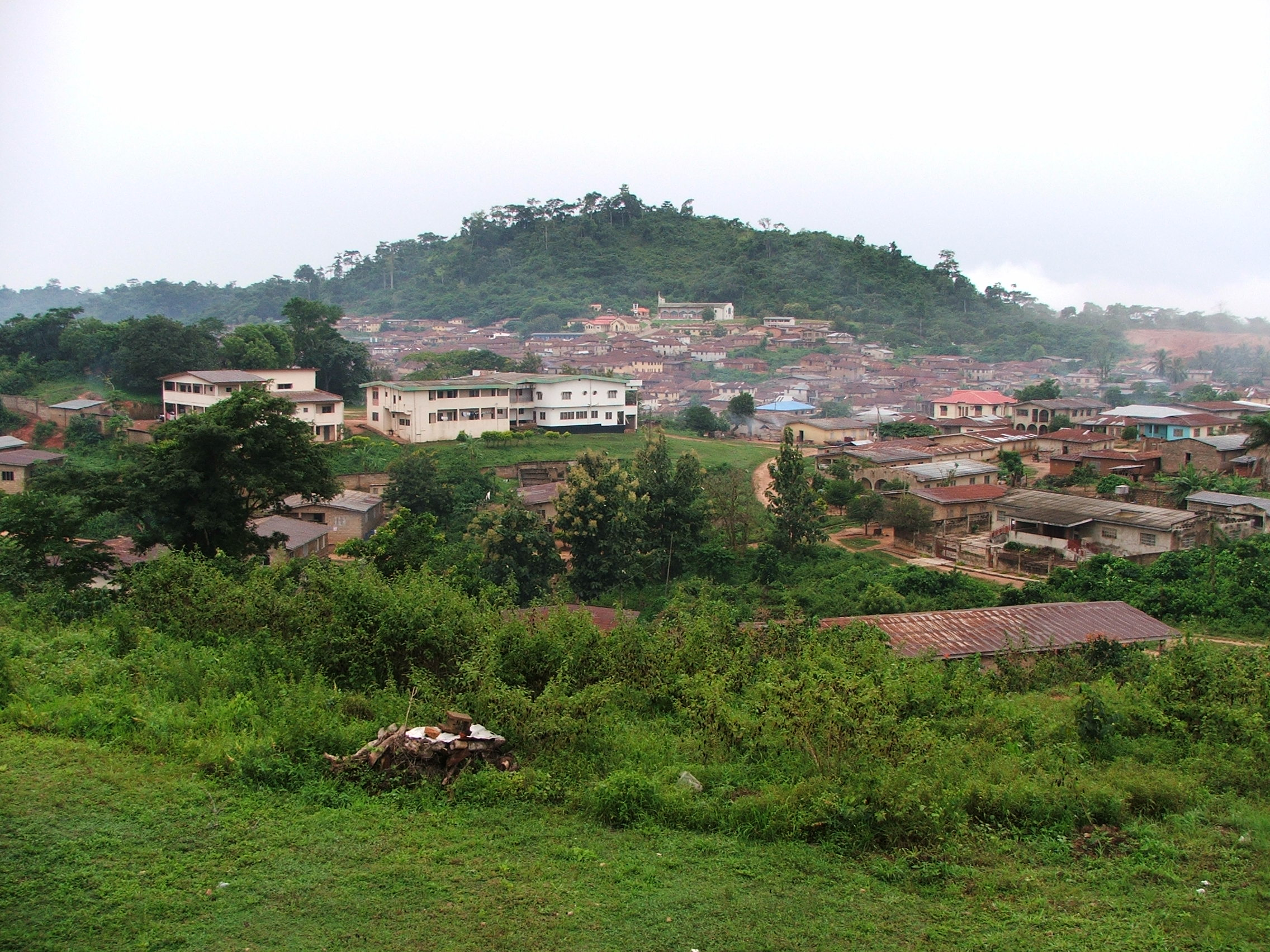
- View of Ipele with St. Stephen's Anglican Church in the background (June 2010)

- Location in Nigeria
- Coordinates: 7°08′0″N 5°40′0″E
- Country: Nigeria
- State: Ondo State
- Local Govt. Area: Owo
- Elevation: 980 ft (300 m)

Population
  - Total: 57,000
- Estimate
- Time zone: GMT +1
- Postcode: 341103

Ipele (Yoruba: Ìpelè. Dialect: Ùpelè) is a town in Owo Local Government in Ondo State, South-Western Nigeria.

== History ==
The modern Ipele community is a conglomeration of eight ancient migration groups, all but with the exception of Isire, who came from Ile-ife, are of Benin extraction, namely: Ujan, Ofi, Usolo, Isire, Oko, Okeriwo, Igemoh and Ulana. A Benin prince and a warrior called Mòkun (also known as Ọlọ́tẹ́n or Ọlọ́tín) and his elder brother Arókun were the first to settle in the land and place that is now known as Ipele (Ùpelè). They were direct descendants of Oba Eweka I of Benin Kingdom, the son of Ọ̀rànmíyàn and grandson of Odùduwà of Ile-Ife. Their father was Omabado who was one of the children of king Orogbua, the Oba of Benin from 1578 -1606 A.D. Their father, Omabado had a special love for the sea that he barely spent time in Benin when they were growing up as he was always on expeditions. This is a persona he took after his own father, Oba Orogbua who made several expeditions from Benin to Eko (present day Lagos) during his reign. The interest their father had for the sea reflected in their names; Arókun means “We saw the sea” while Mòkun is believed to have metamorphosed from Ugwami-mokun or Ugwa-mokun which in Edo language means “my wealth knows the sea".

They migrated from Benin Kingdom in 1625 A.D. at a time when it was suspected that their cousin, Oba Ohuan who was childless due to a curse placed on him by a man called Ogina with whom he had a prolonged feud since he ascended the throne, may start to kill other princes in the kingdom because of his childlessness. Prince Mòkun and his brother with their kins and people first resided at Ùjan near a stream. The stream was later named “Omi- Aṣẹ̀” and till today in Ipele after the circumstantial killing of one of the slaves of Prince Mòkun who committed an offence (nítorí ó ṣẹ̀).

The elder brother, Prince Arókùn later decided to move upward with his own people to the present-day place called Òfì. After some time, Olúrọ̀ndùn, the eldest son of Prince Mòkun went and established his own community called Ùsọlọ̀. He later died of certain ailment and his father, Prince Mòkun who was then known as Olújan Mòkun instructed the people of Ùsọlọ̀ to cut leaves and put on his grave. That is why till today, the spot is called “Àsẹ́wélé” in Ùsọlọ̀. It happened in the process of time that a group of people believed to have migrated from Ile Ife with a large population also came to settle in the area and they were accommodated at Isírẹ́. This makes the people of Ùjan, Òfì, Ùsọlọ̀ and Isírẹ́ the first set of communities that inhabited the present day Ùpelè.

A hunter and a friend of Prince Arókùn whose name was Oluehin, later came over to settle and founded Oko village (now Oko Quarters) in the midlands between the four ancient villages of Ùjan, Òfì, Ùsọlọ̀ and Isírẹ́ around the year 1640 A.D. Oko therefore became the first Quarter to be founded in the midlands area which later became the area specifically known as Ipele or Ùpelè. Next to settle after Òkò in the midlands was the Okeriwo people led by Aga and Ijale who were sibling brothers that migrated from an ancient quarter known as Oke-Ehigho in Benin Kingdom. Closely following the Okeriwo people were the Ugemoh people led by a man known as Ope, a traditional Chief. They migrated from Otuo village very close to Benin. The name Ugemoh in Edo language literally means gentleman or Ọmọlúwàbí in Yoruba. A group of people that migrated from Ifon-Osun later came and settled with the Isírẹ́ people but they did not stay too long as they suspected that their people were missing and dying. They therefore left Isírẹ́ through Omi Ogiron and Omi Olori to settle between Ikaro and Umoru in present day Ifon in Ose local government Area. The Ùlánà people were the last to come in the order of settlement in the area. They originally migrated from Benin Kingdom but first settled at Ighonren near Sabongida Ora before they were eventually led to settle in Ùpelè by a man called Imehenkongba. They were received by Ùjan people who yielded their present land in the midlands to them.

Over time, there were incursion and infiltrations of external attacks. Slave raiders and thieves began to invade the communities and the environs but their tracks (Àpó Olè) were well monitored that they began to meet their death mysteriously in a way no one can really explain. This is why the place received an appellation of Apolè (Thieves’ killer) and Àpó Olè (Thieves’ Tracks) which are the etymologies of the modern day Ùpelè or Ìpelè. The other ancient quarters decided to unify with those at the midlands as one town. Isírẹ́ and Ùsọlọ̀ were the first to join. Ùjan and Ofi Quarters which are the oldest of the eight ancient settlements but the last to join the modern Ipele.

In the last century and a half, new villages which started mostly as farm settlements have sprung up to add to Ipele’s population and growth. Among these new villages and settlements are Omolege, Ajagbale, Oloko, Uwese, Okeogun, Ugbojeu, Oyoroyoro, Ago Alao, Ago Mila, Ago Aderinola and Ita Ipele.

== Geography ==
Ipele is located in the tropical rainforest. Ipele is directly 93 km east of Ondo town, 90 km north of Benin City and 65 km west of Auchi. By road, Ipele is about 15 km from Owo and 60 km from the Ondo State capital, Akure. Elevations in the town ranges from about 285 m to 305 m above sea level.

== Economy ==
The main occupation of the Ipele people is farming. Cash crops such as cocoa, orange and kolanut are cultivated by a large number of farmers. The Ipele community also cultivates crops such as yam, cassava, cocoyam, tomatoes, pepper and corn in abundance.

== Education ==
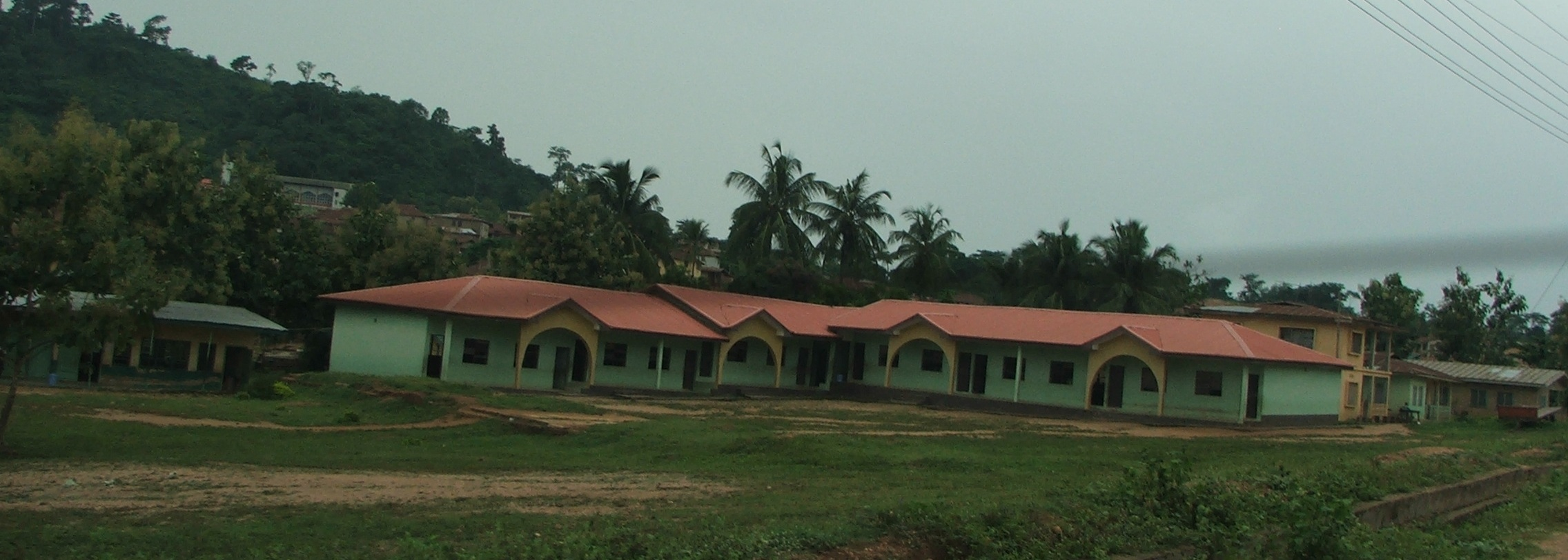
St. John's Anglican Primary School, Ipele (June 2010)

Ipele currently has no post-secondary schools.

The following schools are located in Ipele:

Primary Schools

- Saint John's Anglican Primary School
- Saint Stephens Primary School
- Saint Pauls Catholic Nursery and Primary School
- Ansarudeen Primary School
- New Church Primary School

. Ago Alaoo Primary school . Ago Mila Primary school

Secondary Schools

- Community High School
- Diocesan Secondary School

== Religion ==
Majority of Ipele people are Christians. There are quite a few Muslims as well.

Before the advent of Christianity in Ipele, the indigenes worshipped several gods one of which was Obalufon, a deified Oni of Ife. Obalufon was regarded as a higher god just below Oghodua (Olodumare) the Almighty.

In 1894, Christianity was introduced to Ipele by Ghanaian rubber tappers who worked as migrant workers in the extensive rubber plantations around the town. They worked alongside indigenous workers and were able to introduce this Christianity to their indigenous colleagues. One of such colleagues was late Chief Israel Aiyejimiwo the first Baba-Egbe of the Church in Ipele and the architect of Ipele evangelism.

In December 1906, the Iyeyeriye episode occurred, arising out of the Christmas sermon preached by one John Ige who came from Lagos to strengthen new Christian converts in Ipele. During the sermon, he sang a song on the birth of Christ with the chorus Iyeyeriye Omolorun wa de o (Quite fittingly the Son of God arrives). This refrain later became very popular with all the converts in Owo District and so marked the beginning of a new era for Christians in the district. In June 1907, the first batch of twelve Ipele Christians were baptized by Bishop Johnson from Lagos.

== The Ero Festival ==
Ipele and the people of Ipele are rich in colourful various festivals but the most important one being the seven-yearly Ero festival which is mainly aimed at celebrating old age and thanksgiving for living a worthy and pious life (Sexagenarians and septuagenarians are believed to be in this group). Traditionally, Ipele is a community that can boast of a very rich traditional heritage and culture. A few of the festivals usually observed and celebrated by the people of Ipele are:

ABALIFON (OBAOLUFON): Obaolufon was an Ooni of Ife at one time. He performed brilliantly during his regime that when he died the people made him a god and worshipped him by many Yorubas and was brought to Ipele from Ikole-Ekiti in a spiritual form when there was a tumult in the town during a New Yam Festival. He pacified the town and since then the people has made it an annual event to be worshipping Obaolufon just before the New Year Festival. Obaolufon came to Ipele with Orele as its messenger. The significance of the celebration annually is to appease the spirit of “Olifan” who is generally regarded as the community’s spiritual peace-maker and protector. Human beings were in the past sacrificed until it was systematically changed to dogs as a result of civilization.

Ero Festival: This is the most celebrated and significant of all festivals in Ipele. It comes up once in every six (6) years, traditionally counted seven (7) years. It is an occasion for the graduation of the most senior of the seven age groups – (Olori Ugbama) and it is also an occasion for the initiation of new members to fill the vacant groups. Ipele and the people of Ipele are rich in colourful various festivals but the most important one being the seven yearly Ero Festival which is mainly aimed at celebrating old age and thanks giving for living a worthy and pious life (Sexagenarians and septuagenarians are believed to be in this group). Ero Festival is one of the most colourful festivals in Ondo state celebrated every seven years.

Any native who by ascension in the age group system, gets to the seventh age group will after the next six years become an Ero graduate. The day when all the graduates are marking their graduation from the youthful and semi-adult ages to full adult age is the day usually marked for the main celebration, and which is called Ero. After this festival, they (the Ero graduates) become community elders and will no longer be required to participate in the communal manual work. They can, however, render assistance on advisory capacities voluntarily.

Other related activities performed during the three months period of Ero Festival are:

OKO ERINMI: This signals the arrival of Ero Festival and it is the fore-runner of Ogwo. There are usually two Oko-Erinmi, one from Okeriwo age group while the other one comes from Odogun age group. These people are chosen from among the newly initiated Ogwo age group (Oketa Ugbama). These two chosen people customarily dressed in masquerade attires and usually have their bodies painted with charcoal powder. They hold two unsharpened knives while dancing around the town.
OGWO: This is another interesting event which precedes Ero festival. It requires jogging/dancing of the newly initiated Oketa-Ugbama members round the town. The men wear trousers (Kembe) without upper clothes while the women put on cover clothes, all white. The women will merely be following their male counterparts who are dancing. The physical fitness of the body is practically demonstrated. The jogging/dancing parade is done three times. The first one is known as Ogwo Apanon (preliminary), the second one is called Ogwo Apagwade (first main outing) and the third and final one is called Ogwo Apajoruko (the taking of appellation). Ogwo ceremony normally begins in May of the year of Ero Festival.
IRE OMAKO: This involves dancing around the town with the beating of the ground with sticks by the Oko People. It is basically for the coming together of Oko Quarter and for celebration. Ire Oma-Oko is an event which takes place every six years usually during Ero Festival and it is an event that precedes Omidanmi.

OMIDANMI: This activity is carried out by those who are to be initiated into the second Age Group (Okeji Ugbama). It is the initiation of those previously in Oketa-Ugbama into Okeji Ugbama Group. Omidanmi is a deity in Okeila Quarter. Carrying out of this deity is done by a renounced thief among the group. It serves as punishment for his immorality. All the newly initiated members of this group will crowd round the Omodanmi to make it invisible to the onlookers. It is forbidden for anyone who is not an Okeila lineage or the initiated group from seeing the Omidanmi and anyone who defies this instruction and sees it will have his tongue bulged out. This is the reason why Omidanmi is strictly hidden and people who venture to see it are always caned for their own interest.

OLOPA IJA: These are sticks tied with Oja (head tie) and cowries. The graduates of the 7th age grade (Olori Ugbama) usually carry these Olopaijas out for nine consecutive days prior to Ero festival. The two (2) Olotus (leaders of Okeriwo and Odogun) used to be the first to carry their own Olopaijas out followed by other members of that group. Some people might be limited there to three days while some people will complete the nine mandatory days depending on financial capabilities. The carrying of Olopaija out is an interesting event; the occasion requires dancing to a very melodious traditional music “Gbegbekutu” and indeed an opportunity for young men and women to demonstrate their physical fitness for half-legged wrestling at the roundabout. Also, it is an occasion for feasting and well wishers attend from all walks of life.
IJE ERO: This is the 7th day after Ero Festival; it is an event to commemorate the festival. After this Ije, Oko Ero follows. This is usually on the seventeenth day after Ero proper. It is the going to the farm of each Ero celebrant to ascertain what the graduate left behind since the Ero festival activities started. The graduate usually escorted to his farm by members of his family and well wishers. This is to show how wealthy and energetic the graduate is and everyone on that entourage will carry whatever pleased them from his farm free of charge. Ero festival is the most colourful traditional festival of Ipele Community; the celebration embraces every citizen of the town irrespective of sex, age, religion and belief. Its basic significance is to promote unity, peace, social cohesion and love among the indigenes of Ipele community. This is to show how wealthy and energetic the graduate is and everyone on that entourage will carry whatever pleased them from his farm free of charge.

Ero festival is the most colourful traditional festival of Ipele Community; the celebration embraces every citizen of the town irrespective of sex, age, religion and belief. Its basic significance is to promote unity, peace, social cohesion and love among the indigenes of Ipele community.
