= Emmanuel Daraloye =

Nigerian music journalist

- Born: 30 December 1994 (age 31); Ipele, Ondo State.
- Other name: Emma Tallest
- Education: Adeyemi College of Education
- Occupation: Music Journalist

Emmanuel Daraloye (born 30 December 1994) is a Nigerian music journalist. His works have appeared in NotJustOk, TheCable, The Lagos Review, Vanguard, The Guardian, ModernGhana, Legit.ng, and Nigerian Tribune.

== Early life ==
Born to a chartered accountant father and an entrepreneur mother, Emmanuel Daraloye was born on 30 December 1994 in Ipele, Ondo State but was raised at Akure where he relocated to in 2003. Daraloye spent part of his childhood between Ipele and Akure with parents, grandparents and guardian Daraloye had his primary education briefly at St. Stephen Anglican Primary School and then moved to King and Queen Nursery and Primary School, Oke Aro, Akure where he completed primary education. Daraloye had his secondary education at St. Dominic's High School, Akure and graduated from Adeyemi College of Education with a bachelor's degree in English Education in 2023.

== Career ==
As a freshman at Adeyemi College of Education, Daraloye with his coursemate Ayomide Oguntimehin founded an online newspaper Arbico Parrot, an online student newspaper.

From 2015 to 2019, Daraloye worked as a newscaster, co-presenter, and on-air personality (OAP) at Arbico FM, Ace Campus, EKI 100.9 Fm, Ondo Town and King Sunny Ade owned Music & Culture 106.5 Fm, Ondo Town.

Since 2022, Daraloye has served as a senior music critic at Afrocritik and also reviews at AfroReview, a newsletter he founded in January 2022. His works has appeared at NotJustOk, TheCable, The Lagos Review, Vanguard, The Guardian, ModernGhana, Legit.ng, Nigerian Tribune. Daraloye has been described as a "driving force in shaping the narrative, guiding audiences through the richness of African music".
