= New Afrika Shrine =

Entertainment centre in Lagos, Nigeria

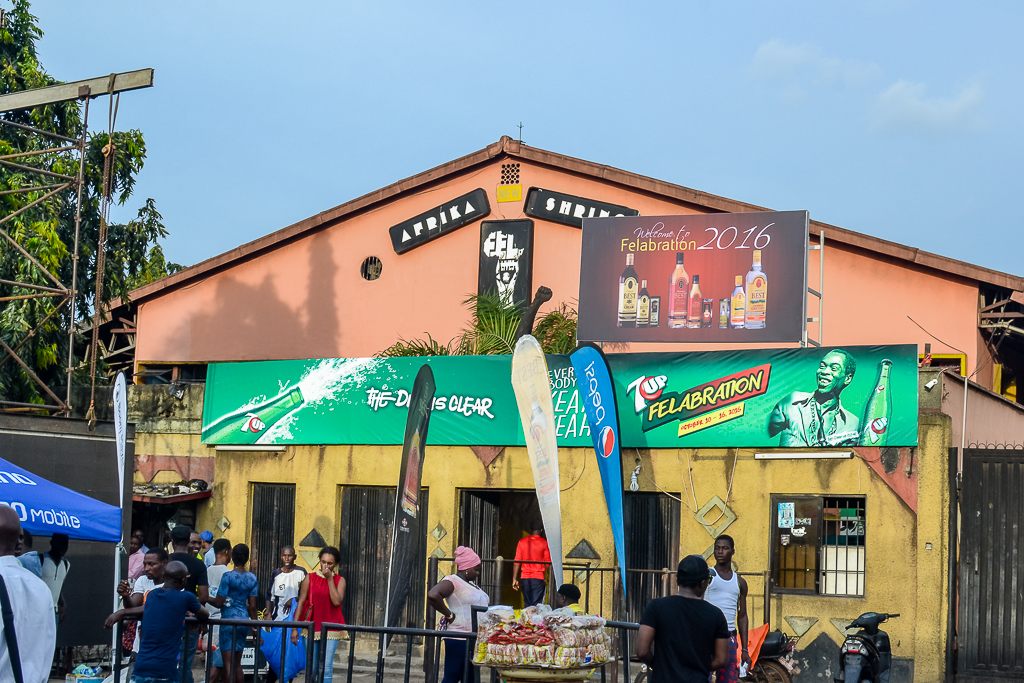
- New Afrika Shrine in 2014
- Interactive map of New Afrika Shrine
- Type: Public square
- Location: Lagos Mainland, Ikeja Lagos, Nigeria
- Created: 1970
- Operator: Femi Kuti, and Yeni Anikulapo-Kuti
- Status: Open year-round

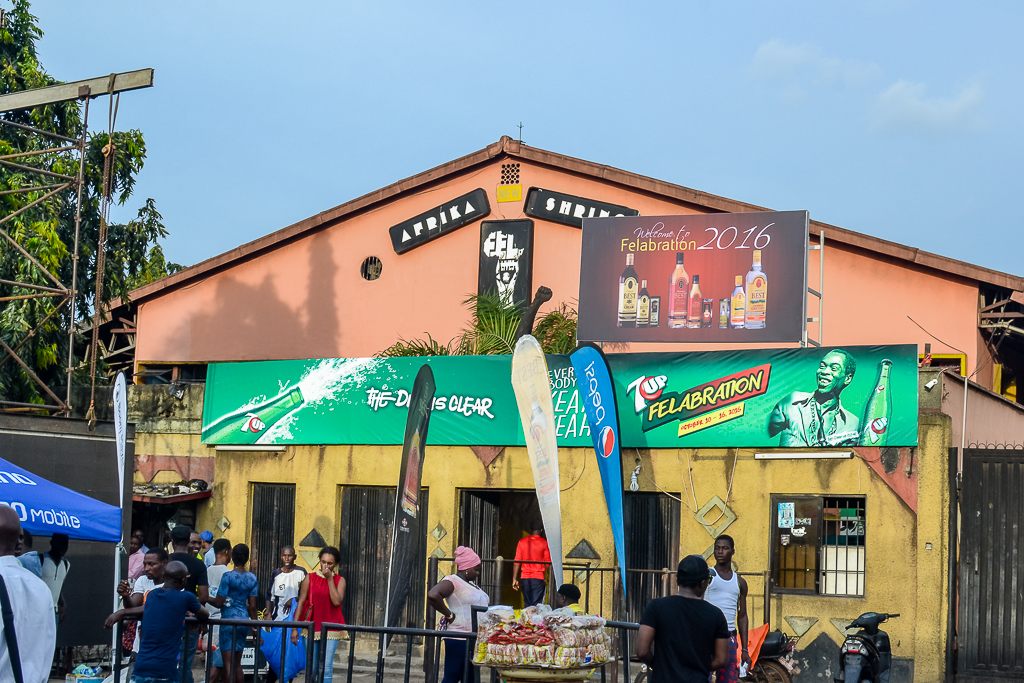
The New Afrika Shrine, Lagos

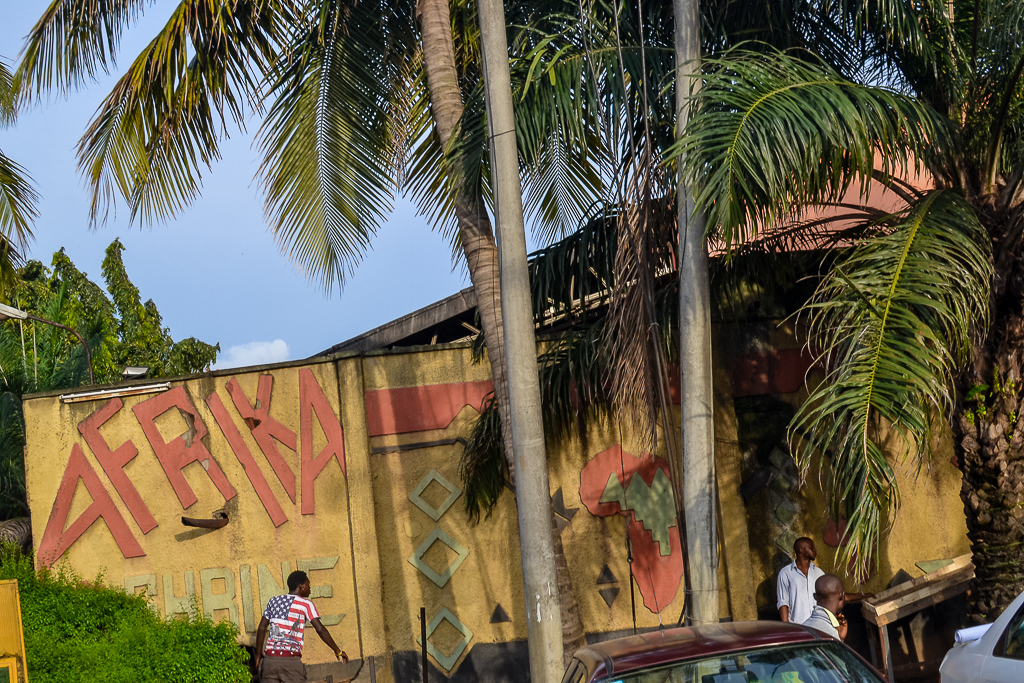
The New Afrika Shrine, Lagos

The New Afrika Shrine is an open-air entertainment center located in Ikeja, Lagos State. It serves as the host location of the annual Felabration music festival. Currently managed by Femi Kuti (eldest son of Fela Kuti) and Yeni Anikulapo-Kuti, it is the replacement of the old Afrika Shrine created in 1970 by Fela Kuti until it was burnt down in 1977. The New Afrika Shrine showcases photo galleries of Fela and music performances by Femi Kuti and Seun Kuti thus making it a tourist attraction.

== See also ==
- Felabration
