= Boomplay =

Music streaming service

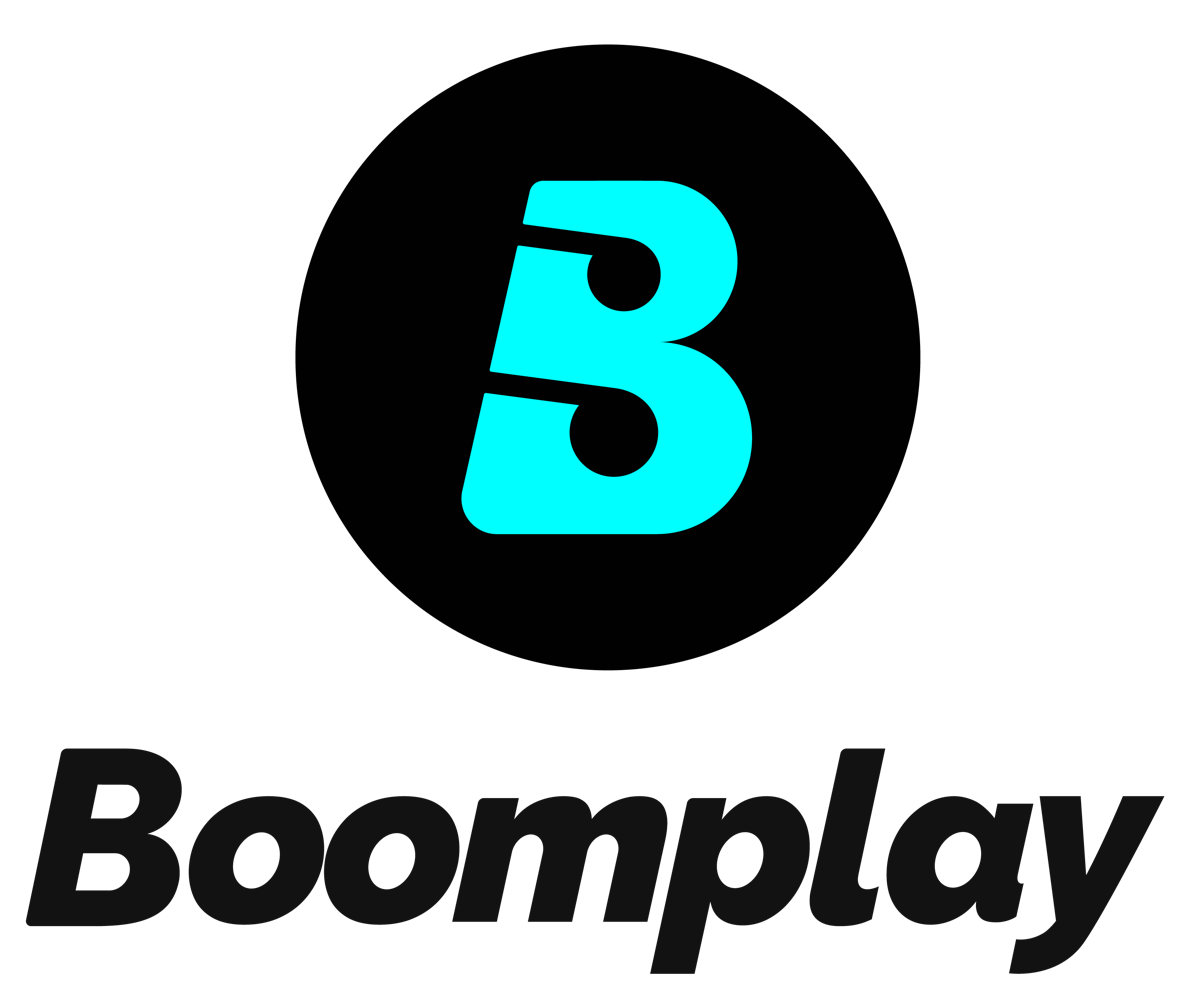
- Company type: Private
- Founded: August 2015; 11 years ago Lagos, Nigeria
- Key people: Luke Cao (CEO)
- Industry: Streaming on-demand media
- Services: Streaming media
- Website: boomplay.com
- Registration: Required
- Users: 95 million (monthly active)
- Current status: Active
- Native client on: Web, Android, iOS, KaiOS

Boomplay, or Boomplay Music, is an Africa-focused media streaming and download service. Developed by Transsnet Music Limited, the platform was first launched in Nigeria in 2015 by TECNO Mobile, Transsion Holdings. Boomplay has a freemium and subscription based service; basic features are free with advertisements or limitations, while additional features, such as download for offline play and ad-free listening are offered via paid subscriptions. The service is currently available for Web, Android and iOS. As of August 3, 2018, Boomplay Music recorded 10 million installations on Google Play and App Store. It currently has over 75 million monthly users (MAU) with a catalogue of over 100 million songs by 7.5 million artists.

== History ==
Boomplay primarily focuses on African local and urban music content and was first launched in Nigeria in 2015. Boomplay Music released version 2.1 in March 2016, introducing its Premium subscription, which featured paid subscription services, ad-free listening, and downloads for offline play. In March 2017, Boomplay Music released version 3.0 which featured a new logo, redesigned user interface, the follow feature and the introduction of a new "Buzz" feature that allows users access to entertainment news without leaving the app. In 2017, it won the 'Best African App' Award at the AppsAfrica Innovation Awards in Cape Town, South Africa, and on April 14, 2017, announced a partnership with TuneCore.

On 5 November 2018, Boomplay Music agreed a deal with Universal Music Group to distribute content from Universal's music labels. The agreement brings UMG's extensive catalog of both local and global recording artists including Eminem, Tekno, Post Malone, Nicki Minaj, Lady Zamar, Lil Wayne, Bob Marley, Brenda Fassie, Wurld, J. Cole, Dr Tumi, Nasty C, 6lack, Diana Ross, Hugh Masekela, Jon Bellion, Lady Gaga, Tamia, Maroon 5, AKA & Anatii, Tjan, Jah Prayzah, Nonso Bassey, Mafikizolo, Cina Soul, Ella Mai, and Mr Eazi to its users. In December 2018, the iOS version of the app was released.

In March 2019, Boomplay announced a licensing deal with Warner Music Group. The terms of the partnership allow Boomplay to distribute Warner Music's extensive catalogue of more than one million songs to its community of listeners in ten countries; Cameroon, Côte d'Ivoire, Ghana, Kenya, Nigeria, Rwanda, Senegal, Tanzania, Uganda and Zambia. Boomplay completed a series A funding of US$20 million led by Maison Capital and followed by Seas Capital and other strategic investors. In 2021 it was announced that Boomplay is working with Croatian vendor Centili to innovate data payment models. Customers earn points that can be used in exchange for data, can take part in promotions and competitions to win data, and can gift data to other users. This feature was launched initially in Nigeria, but is expected to be rolled out to the other countries in which Boomplay operates.

Billboard announced in October 2021, that data from Boomplay streams would be added to the data used in collating the Billboard Hot 100, Billboard 200 and other Billboard data-driven charts.

=== Partners ===
In May 2019, Boomplay signed a distribution agreement with Believe Digital distribution services. Believe was founded in Paris in 2004 by Denis Ladegaillerie as a worldwide online distribution and services arm and an in-house record label. With 32 offices in 16 territories, the company's clients include Scorpio Music, Kitsune, Chinese Man Records, Fargo, Baco Records, Afrique Caraibes Productions and Yellow. Also in 2019, Boomplay announced licensing deals with Warner Music Group, Universal Music Group, Sony Music Group, and global indie rights agency Merlin.

In June 2022, Boomplay partnered with telecommunications company AirtelTigo to offer its users cheaper data to stream music in its app.

=== Expansion ===
Boomplay announced its move into East Africa by opening its Kenyan office in August 2016. It opened its Tanzania office in April 2017. It currently has local operations and offices in Nigeria, Kenya, Ghana, Tanzania, Côte d'Ivoire, and Cameroon.

=== Accounts and subscriptions ===
As of the middle of 2020, Boomplay had 75 million users in Africa.

As of July 2022, the two Boomplay subscription types, both offering unlimited listening time and enhanced sound quality (up to 320 kbit/s bitrate) are:

Type	Ad-Free	Mobile listening	320 kbit/s audio?	Offline Save and Play	Music downloads
Boomplay Music Free	No	Limited	Yes	Yes	Yes
Boomplay Music Premium	Yes	Yes	Yes	Yes	Yes
