= Felabration =

Music festival

- Felabration 2015 promotional poster
- Genre: Afrobeat; Afropop; R&B; Reggae; Dancehall
- Locations: New Afrika Shrine, Ikeja
- Years active: 1998–present
- Founders: Yeni Anikulapo-Kuti
- Website: felabration.net

Felabration is an annual music festival conceived in 1998 by Yeni Anikulapo-Kuti in memory and celebration of her father Fela Kuti, a Nigerian musician and human rights activist known for pioneering the Afrobeat genre of music. The one-week-long event which is held annually at the New Afrika Shrine in Ikeja, attracts visitors from different countries and has thus been considered as an official tourist destination by the Lagos State Government.

Felabration is held on the week of Fela Kuti's birthday. The event features musical performances from top music acts from Nigeria and guest appearances from internationally acclaimed musicians and personalities. It also consists of street parades, symposia on social and topical issues, debates and photo exhibitions.

== 2015 edition: "Just Like That" ==
The week-long festival took place from 12 to 18 October 2015 at the famous Afrika Shrine, Ikeja, Lagos State. That year's edition kicked off with a symposium titled "Human Rights As My Property", and the session was anchored by Honourable Sasore, former Attorney General of Lagos State. There were also the annual Fela debates for secondary schools, tagged "Poverty Is Not An Accident". The festival had performances from star acts including international reggae group Third World, 2face, Femi Kuti, Ice Prince, as well as a surprise performance by Majek Fashek.

== 2016 edition: "Everybody Say Yeah Yeah" ==
The week-long festival was held from 10 to 16 October 2016 at the Afrika Shrine, Ikeja, Lagos State. The theme was derived from one of Fela's sayings with which he used to entertain guests during his performances. The festival began with a symposium titled "Movement Against Second Slavery" that was moderated by Prof. Sophie Oluwole. There were also the famous Fela debates, art exhibition, street carnivals and other activities to thrill fans. There were performances from artistes such as Jaywon, Ajebutter, Orezi, Sugarboy and Ojjay Wright.

== 2017 edition: "The Prophecy" ==
The week-long festival took place from 9 to 15 October 2017 at the Afrika Shrine, Ikeja, Lagos State. The theme was coined out from one of the lyrics of Fela that says "i don sing am before, nothing new". The Festival had its normal school debates titled "African History; a curriculum necessity". The festival symposium was tagged "Whither the Pan African Dream – 20 years after Fela and 40 years after FESTAC '77?" and it was moderated by Professor Patrice Lumumba, a renowned Kenyan scholar. Other speakers at the festival includes Ben Bruce, Donald Duke. There were also performances from artiste to thrill fans, the usual street carnival and arts exhibition.

== 2018 edition: "Overtake Don Overtake Overtake" ==
The week-long festival took place from 15 to 21 October 2018 at the New Afrika Shrine, Ikeja, Lagos State. This editions theme was coined out of Felas legendary hit titled "Overtake Don Overtake Overtake". The song talks about Fela's anger at the Nigerian government for allowing the society to decay, increase in injustice and those that are supposed to change things are leaving the country to decay.

The celebration was also boosted by the visit of French President Emmanuel Macron to the New Africa Shrine. As part of the celebration, there were performances from famous Nigerian artiste including Femi Kuti, Davido, Mayorkun and Peruzzi to celebrate the life of the legendary Fela and also to celebrate afrobeat music, which can be termed the heartbeat of the legendary Icon Fela Kuti. The major sponsor for this years celebration is the Legend extra stout from the Nigerian brewery company. Other activities that followed the week-long event includes The Fela Debates, debates for secondary schools in Lagos state, photo exhibitions, Fela street carnival and other activities geared at celebrating afrobeat. One of the highlights of the event was the mild drama that ensured between Vice president Yemi Osinbajo and Femi Kuti.

== 2019 edition: "From Lagos With Love" ==
The week-long festival took place from 14 to 20 October 2019 at the New Afrika Shrine, Lagos State. The theme was inspired by the popular Felas song titled "Eko Ile". The song talks about praises for Lagos state as a centre of love, joy and fun and urges everyone to visit Lagos state because Lagos state is home. The celebration had in attendance afrobeat sensation and BET 2019 Internation Act winner Damini Ebunoluwa Ogulu popularly known as Burna boy who thrilled the crowd with performance of some of his hit tracks like "ye", "On the Low" and "Another Story". Other artistes that graced the celebration includes Charly Boy, Sauti Sol, Labaja, King Sunny Ade, Efe and a host of other afrobeat musicians.

The celebration also had a symposium anchored by popular award-winning black African poet and writer Chimamanda Ngozi Adichie, Bobi Wine; musician turned politician from Uganda, Professor Akin Oyebode, professor of jurisprudence and international law and famous celebrated Nigerian playwright and author Sefi Atta. As usual, the celebration had a secondary schools debate, Fela debates, art exhibitions and other side activities to keep fans entertained for the week-long festival.

== 2020 virtual edition: "Fight to Finish, Fight to Win" ==
The festival took place from 15 to 17 October 2020. Due to the COVID-19 pandemic rocking the world at the time of the festival and the restriction on gatherings and activities, the organisers chose to hold the festival virtually. This was the first time the festival was held virtually. The Festival was kickstarted with a Felabration symposium titled "Colomentality" which was anchored by a Ugandan journalist and broadcaster Vincent Magombe. Some of the speakers at the symposium includes Arikana Chihombori, former permanent representative to the African Union Mission in Washinghton and Kweku Mandela, a filmmaker and producer from South Africa.

Other activities in the festival included the "Dress Like Fela Challenge", where fans compete to imitate the dressing of the legendary Fela, with the winner going home with fifty thousand naira. There was also the secondary school debates, art festivals and other events that preceded the festival, and there were musical performances from Wizkid, 2baba, Joeboy, Falz and a host of other afrobeat musicians.

== 2022 edition: "Fear not for Man" ==
The 2022 Felabration was held at the New Afrikan Shrine, Ikeja, from 10 to 16 October 2022. There were a total of 300 musical acts that performed onstage during the concert. The 2022 Felabration was themed "Fear not for man" and was hosted by Omo Baba.

At the show, several different musical acts took the stage, including Femi Kuti, Made Kuti, MI, Vector, Phyno, Omawumi, Sule Alao Malaika, Candy Bleakz, Terry G, Rema to name a few.

== Debates and public speaking ==
Every year, Felabration holds a public speaking and debate contest for students of secondary schools on topics that are most concerning to the society. The most recent edition was won by Abdulrahman Oke, a student of King's College, Lagos, while speaking on the effects of video games.
