= Phyno discography =

Artist discography

- Studio albums: 5
- Singles: 186
- Music videos: 60
- Collaborative albums: 1
- Promotional singles: 8

The discography of Phyno consists of five studio albums, one collaborative album, one-hundred and ninety-three singles (including one-hundred and forty-five as featured artist), five promotional singles, and sixty music videos. Phyno began rapping in 2010 and later moved to Lagos to pursue music professionally. His debut studio album No Guts No Glory was released in 2014, featuring singles like "Ghost Mode" with Olamide and "Man of the Year (Obago)", both of which won major awards at The Headies. In 2015, he collaborated with Olamide on the joint album 2 Kings. The Playmaker, his second studio album, was released on 1 November 2016. It spawned singles like "Connect" and "Fada Fada". His third studio album Deal With It, released in 2019, included guest appearances from artists such as Davido, Teni, and Don Jazzy. Phyno followed up with Something to Live For in 2021, which featured collaborations with Flavour, The Cavemen., and D Smoke. His fifth studio album Full Time Job was released on 4 October 2024.

== Studio albums ==
Title	Album details
No Guts No Glory	Released: 20 March 2014; Label: Sputnet Records, Penthauze Music; Format: CD, digital download
The Playmaker	Released: 1 November 2016; Label: Penthauze Music; Format: CD, digital download
Deal with It	Released: 4 September 2019; Label: Penthauze Music; Format: CD, digital download
Something to Live For	Released: 12 November 2021; Label: Penthauze Music; Format: Streaming, digital download
Full Time Job	Released: 4 October 2024; Label: Penthauze Music; Format: Streaming, digital download
Let That Sink In (LTSI)	Released: 29 October 2026; Label: Penthauze Music; Format: Streaming, digital download

== Collaborative albums ==
Title	Album details
2 Kings (with Olamide)	Released: 1 April 2015; Label: Penthauze Music, YBNL Nation; Format: CD, digital download

== Singles ==
=== As lead artist ===
List of singles as lead artist, with selected chart positions
Title	Year	Album
"Multiply" (solo or remix featuring Timaya, Flavour, Mr Raw, and M.I)	2010	No Guts No Glory
"Holiday" (featuring Runtown)	2011	No Guts No Glory
"Ghost Mode" (featuring Olamide)	2012	No Guts No Glory
"Man of the Year (Obago)"	2013	No Guts No Glory
"Parcel"	2013	No Guts No Glory
"O Set" (featuring P-Square)	2014	No Guts No Glory
"Yayo"	2014	Non-album singles
"Oringo"	2014	Non-album singles
"Une"	2015	2 Kings
"Nnunu" (featuring Stormrex)	2015	Non-album singles
"Asai"	2015	Non-album singles
"Connect"	2015	The Playmaker
"Ezege"	2016	The Playmaker
"Fada Fada" (featuring Olamide)	2016	The Playmaker
"E Sure for Me"	2016	The Playmaker
"Pino Pino"	2016	The Playmaker
"If to Say"	2017	Non-album singles
"Zamo Zamo" (featuring Wande Coal)	2017	Non-album singles
"Augment" (featuring Olamide)	2017	Non-album singles
"Isi Ego"	2018	Non-album singles
"One Chance" (featuring Kranium)	2018	Non-album singles
"Onyeoma" (featuring Olamide)	2018	Non-album singles
"N.W.A" (featuring Wale)	2018	Non-album singles
"Road 2 Russia (Dem Go Hear Am)" (with Olamide)	2018	Non-album singles
"Fuwa Sewa"	2018	Non-album singles
"Iwa" (featuring Tekno)	2018	Non-album singles
"Oil"	2018	Non-album singles
"Iyilu Ife"	2018	Non-album singles
"Agu"	2019	Deal with It
"The Bag"	2019	Deal with It
"All I See" (featuring Duncan Mighty)	2019	Deal with It
"Ride for You" (featuring Davido)	2019	Deal with It
"Never"	2020	Non-album singles
"For the Money" (featuring Peruzzi)	2020	Non-album singles
"Bia"	2021	Something to Live For
"Stacks"	2021	Something to Live For
"Do You Wrong" (featuring Olamide)	2021	Something to Live For
"Full Current (That's My Baby)" (featuring Tekno)	2022	Non-album singles
"BBO (Bad Bxtches Only)"	2022	Non-album singles
"Ojemba" (featuring Olamide)	2023	Non-album singles
"Do I"	2023	Full Time Job
"Do I (Remix)" (featuring Burna Boy)	2023	Full Time Job
"Time of My Life" (featuring ArrDee)	2024	Full Time Job
"Back Outside" (featuring Cheque)	2025	Full Time Job
"Deep" (featuring Fave)	2025	Full Time Job
"Uzo Ano" (with Flavour)	2026	Non-album single

=== As featured artist ===
List of singles as featured artist
Title	Year	Album
"Ndi Okoko" (Stormrex featuring Phyno and Shuga Boi)	2011	The New Storm
"Turu Ugo" (Mr Raw featuring Minista Busta, Ransom, and Phyno)	2011	End of Discussion
"Anam Achi Kwanu" (Illbliss featuring Phyno)	2011	Oga Boss
"Ekwe Ekwe" (Slow Dog featuring Phyno)	2011	D.R.O.S (De Return of Slow Dog)
"What It Do" (Laylow featuring Jesse Jagz, Phenom, Yung6ix, Olamide, Buckwylla, Sossick, Phyno, Seriki, and Liu T)	2012	Non-album singles
"Eziokwu" (Lynxxx featuring Ikechukwu, Illbliss, and Phyno)	2012	Non-album singles
"Serekode" (Pheelz featuring Olamide, Orezi, Phyno, and Terry Apala)	2013	Non-album singles
"Koma Roll (Remix)" (Tillaman featuring Iyanya, Burna Boy, Ice Prince, Phyno, and Trigga Madtonic)	2013	Non-album singles
"Aka Na Enu" (Loose Kaynon featuring Phyno)	2013	Non-album singles
"Emi Ni Oba" (DJ Neptune featuring Dagrin, Ruggedman, Uzi, Phyno, Reminisce, and Pope Da Hitman)	2013	Non-album singles
"Grown Men" (DJ JoeNel featuring Phyno, Nivvy G, and Spaceman)	2013	Non-album singles
"Kolo for You (Remix)" (Retta Rich featuring Eva, Phyno, and Casey Ed)	2013	Non-album singles
"Onye Ije" (Splash featuring Phyno)	2013	Non-album singles
"Bless My Hustle" (Chidinma featuring Phyno)	2013	Non-album singles
"Ochanya" (Ayoola featuring Phyno)	2013	Non-album singles
"Voom Va" (Skuki featuring Phyno)	2013	Non-album singles
"Dodging the Wash" (Tha Suspect featuring Phyno)	2013	Non-album singles
"Local Boy (Remix)" (Ransome featuring Phyno)	2013	Non-album singles
"Nsogbu" (Tha Suspect featuring Illbliss and Phyno)	2013	Non-album singles
"30/40" (Tha Suspect featuring Illbliss and Phyno)	2013	Diamond in the Ruff
"On the Aisle" (Hype MC featuring Phyno)	2013	Non-album singles
"Money on My Mind" (BosaLin featuring Phyno)	2013	Non-album singles
"Surulere (Remix)" (Dr Sid featuring Don Jazzy, Wizkid, and Phyno)	2013	Siduction
"Ukwu Nka (Remix)" (Pucado featuring Phyno)	2014	Non-album singles
"Show Me Yuh Rozay (Remix)" (Ketchup featuring Olamide and Phyno)	2014	Non-album singles
"Nganga" (Mista Chivagu featuring Phyno)	2014	Non-album singles
"Odunayo" (Creddy-F featuring Chidinma and Phyno)	2014	Non-album singles
"Wazobia" (Morell featuring Reminisce and Phyno)	2014	Non-album singles
"Madantin (Remix)" (Jaywon featuring Phyno, Olamide, and May D)	2014	Oba Orin
"Destinambari" (Mo'Cheddah featuring Phyno)	2014	Non-album singles
"Local Boy (Remix)" (Ransome featuring Phyno)	2014	Non-album singles
"Turn Down for What" (Masterkraft featuring Phyno)	2014	Non-album singles
"Bombay" (Wizkid featuring Phyno)	2014	Ayo
"Surulere (Tiwa Savage Remix)" (Dr Sid featuring Don Jazzy, Wizkid, Phyno, and Tiwa Savage)	2014	Non-album single
"Turn Up" (LeriQ featuring Burna Boy and Phyno)	2014	The Lost Sounds
"Nwafor" (Safin De Coque featuring Phyno)	2014	Non-album singles
"Rands and Nairas (Remix)" (Emmy Gee featuring Ice Prince, AB Crazy, Anatii, Phyno, Cassper Nyovest, and DJ Dimplez)	2014	Non-album singles
"Africa (Remix)" (Blackmagic featuring Vector, Phyno, and Reminisce)	2014	Non-album singles
"E To Beh" (DJ Jimmy Jatt featuring Banky W. and Phyno)	2014	The Industry, Vol. 1
"Iwotago" (B-Red featuring Phyno)	2014	All the Way Up
"All My Ladies" (Viktoh featuring Phyno)	2014	Non-album singles
"Get in Da Picture" (VVIP featuring Idris Elba and Phyno)	2014	Non-album singles
"Nwa Nee" (Stormrex featuring Phyno)	2014	Non-album singles
"Gbayawa" (TSpize featuring Phyno)	2014	Non-album singles
"Gbagam" (Timaya featuring Deettii and Phyno)	2014	Epiphany
"Believe" (DJ Neptune featuring Sarkodie and Phyno)	2014	Non-album singles
"China" (Naeto C featuring Phyno and Jay Sleek)	2014	Non-album singles
"Coco Butter (Remix)" (Charass featuring Davido and Phyno)	2014	Non-album singles
"Ticket 2 Love" (George Nathaniel featuring J. Martins and Phyno)	2014	Non-album singles
"Wiser" (Flavour featuring Phyno and M.I)	2014	Thankful
"Love to Love You (Remix)" (Niyola featuring Phyno, Sarkodie, Lynxxx, and Poe)	2014	Non-album single
"Bank Alert (Remix)" (Illbliss featuring Ice Prince, Eva, and Phyno)	2014	Powerful
"Gbawaya (Remix)" (TSpize featuring Phyno and Flavour)	2014	Non-album single
"Jide Ofor" (Duncan Mighty featuring Phyno)	2014	Grace & Talent
"Taking over Me" (Yemi Alade featuring Phyno)	2015	King of Queens
"Local Rappers" (Reminisce featuring Olamide and Phyno)	2015	Baba Hafusa
"Get Some Money" (Ice Prince featuring Olamide and Phyno)	2015	Non-album singles
"Ofu Ala" (Big Spanx featuring Slow Dog and Phyno)	2015	Non-album singles
"Salambala" (Wizboyy featuring Phyno)	2015	Non-album singles
"King Kong (Remix)" (Vector featuring Phyno, Reminisce, Classiq, and Uzi)	2015	Non-album singles
"Karishika" (Falz featuring Phyno and Chigul)	2015	Stories That Touch
"Hoha" (Magnito featuring Phyno)	2015	Non-album singles
"Major (Gbankiti)" (Major Bangz featuring Phyno)	2015	Non-album singles
"Spend Owo" (BlackGate featuring Sarkodie and Phyno)	2015	Non-album singles
"Ebano (Remix)" (Wrecobah featuring Phyno)	2015	Non-album singles
"Pepper" (Teddy-A featuring Phyno)	2015	Non-album singles
"Am on Fire" (Pasuma featuring Phyno)	2015	My Story
"Osinachi" (Humblesmith featuring Phyno)	2015	Non-album singles
"Knack Am" (Terry G featuring Wizkid, Phyno, and Runtown)	2015	Non-album singles
"Bullion Van" (M.I featuring Phyno, Runtown, and Stormrex)	2015	The Chairman
"Odi Okay" (Mr Raw featuring Phyno)	2015	Non-album singles
"Aka Gi (Remix)" (Slow Dog featuring Phyno)	2015	Non-album singles
"Duro (Remix)" (Tekno featuring Flavour and Phyno)	2015	Non-album singles
"Hustle" (Zorah featuring Phyno)	2015	Non-album singles
"Tarity" (D'Prince featuring Phyno)	2015	Non-album singles
"Twerk It" (Tony Ross featuring Cynthia Morgan and Phyno)	2015	Non-album singles
"Werey Re O (Remix)" (Base One featuring Olamide and Phyno)	2015	Non-album singles
"Kanayo" (Eva featuring Phyno and Reminisce)	2016	1960
"Coded Tinz" (2Baba featuring Phyno and Chief Obi)	2016	Non-album singles
"Say No More" (Samini featuring Phyno)	2016	Non-album singles
"Who You Epp? (Refix)" (Olamide featuring Wande Coal and Phyno)	2016	The Glory
"Show Love" (Tony Wenom featuring Phyno)	2016	Non-album singles
"I Still Want My Girl (Ashawo Remix)" (Dizzy VC featuring Phyno)	2016	Non-album singles
"Duro Ni Be" (Burna Boy featuring Phyno)	2016	On a Spaceship
"Soft (Remix)" (Naeto C featuring Burna Boy and Phyno)	2016	Non-album single
"Gbo Gan Gbom" (Flavour featuring Phyno and Zoro)	2016	Non-album single
"No Matter What" (Posly TD featuring Phyno)	2016	Non-album single
"E Pass Go" (Skuki featuring Phyno)	2016	Non-album single
"African Lady" (Sound Sultan featuring Flavour and Phyno)	2016	Out of the Box
"Achikolo" (Zoro featuring Phyno)	2016	Non-album singles
"All the Loving" (General Pype featuring Burna Boy and Phyno)	2016	Non-album singles
"Follow Me Solo (Remix)" (2Sec featuring Phyno)	2016	Non-album singles
"Trillions" (Ice Prince featuring Phyno)	2016	Jos to the World
"Ogbugianyi" (Ruffcoin featuring Phyno and Zoro)	2016	Made in Aba
"Money Is Relevant" (Yung6ix featuring Phyno and Percy)	2016	High Star
"Adim Bad" (Deejay J Masta featuring Phyno)	2017	Non-album singles
"Testimony (Remix)" (Slow Dog featuring Phyno and TJ)	2017	Non-album singles
"No Cameras" (Cynthia Morgan featuring Phyno)	2017	Non-album singles
"001" (Major Bangz featuring Olamide and Phyno)	2017	Non-album singles
"Betrayal" (J. Martins featuring Phyno)	2017	Non-album singles
"Blessings" (Chigul featuring Phyno and Mayorkun)	2017	Non-album singles
"Medicine (Remix)" (Wizkid featuring Flavour and Phyno)	2017	Non-album singles
"Telli Person" (Timaya featuring Olamide and Phyno)	2017	Non-album singles
"Dance" (KCee featuring Phyno)	2017	Attention to Detail
"Mr Successful" (Wrecobah featuring Phyno)	2018	Non-album single
"Aye" (CDQ featuring Phyno and Reminisce)	2018	Ibile Mugabe
"By My Side" (DJ Derekz featuring Flavour and Phyno)	2018	Non-album singles
"Yem Ego" (Phenom featuring Phyno)	2018	Non-album singles
"Ani" (Deejay J Masta featuring Phyno and Flavour)	2018	Non-album singles
"Pray" (Dr Dolor featuring Teni and Phyno)	2018	Non-album singles
"Double Double" (Rudeboy featuring Phyno and Olamide)	2018	Non-album singles
"Itetago" (Slim Brown featuring Phyno)	2018	Non-album singles
"Piom Piom" (DJ Prince featuring Olamide and Phyno)	2019	Non-album single
"La La La" (Masterkraft featuring Phyno and Selebobo)	2019	Non-album single
"Akpa Aza" (Tidinz featuring Phyno and Zoro)	2019	Non-album single
"Feel Good" (Ice Prince featuring Phyno and Falz)	2019	Non-album single
"Na You" (Chief Obi featuring Phyno)	2019	Non-album single
"Culture" (Umu Obiligbo featuring Phyno and Flavour)	2019	Non-album single
"Oloun" (Mr Real featuring Phyno, Reminisce, and DJ Kaywise)	2019	Non-album single
"Power of Cool" (Teni featuring Phyno)	2019	Non-album single
"Holy Water" (Anjulie and Natalie Lafourcade featuring Phyno)	2019	Non-album single
"Slow" (Rayvanny featuring Phyno)	2019	Non-album single
"Owale" (Idowest featuring Phyno)	2019	Non-album single
"Aje (Wazobia Remix 2)" (Jaywon featuring Phyno, Zlatan, and Magnito)	2019	Aje the Mixtape
"Focus" (Kezyklef featuring Phyno, Illbliss, and Harrysong)	2020	Non-album singles
"Gentleman" (Mr Raw featuring Phyno)	2020	Non-album singles
"Chop Life" (Flavour featuring Phyno)	2020	Non-album singles
"Papa Benji" (Basketmouth featuring Flavour and Phyno)	2020	Non-album singles
"Remember (Remix)" (Jeriq featuring Phyno)	2020	Non-album singles
"Ayo'm" (Zoro featuring Phyno, Mr Eazi, Chike, and Umu Obiligbo)	2020	Non-album singles
"High Way" (DJ Kaywise featuring Phyno)	2020	
"Chupadia" (Nuno Zigi featuring Phyno)	2021	Non-album single
"Egbon" (Masterkraft featuring Phyno)	2021	Non-album single
"T.Y.B" (Del B featuring Phyno and Mufasa)	2021	Non-album single
"Eff All Day" (Timaya featuring Phyno)	2021	Non-album single
"Egedege" (Larry Gaaga featuring Flavour, Phyno, and Theresa Onuorah)	2021	Non-album single
"New Video" (Zoro featuring Phyno)	2022	Non-album single
"Breakfast" (Ugoccie featuring Phyno)	2022	Non-album single
"Bags" (Blaq Jerzee featuring Phyno)	2022	Non-album single
"Top Mama" (Spinall featuring Reekado Banks, Phyno, and Ntosh Gazi)	2022	Top Boy
"Lover" (Johnny Drille featuring Phyno)	2022	Home
"Muke Muke" (Deejay J Masta featuring Phyno)	2023	Non-album singles
"Shutdown" (Spyro featuring Phyno)	2024	Non-album singles
"Shame On You" (Prettyboy D-O featuring Phyno)	2024	Non-album singles
"Obodo" (Larry Gaaga featuring Phyno, Flavour, and Theresa Onuorah)	2024	Non-album singles
"W for Wetego" (Blaqbonez featuring Phyno and Young Jonn)	2025	Non-album singles
"God Design" (Jux featuring Phyno)	2025	Non-album singles
"Ofeke (Remix)" (Spyki featuring Phyno)	2025	Non-album singles
"Billings" (Yung Alpha featuring Phyno and Flavour)	2025	Non-album singles
"Ilu Agha" (Evado featuring Phyno)	2025	Non-album singles

== Promotional singles ==
List of promotional singles
Title	Year	Album
"Shut Down"	2011	Non-album singles
"Wat R U W18 4"	2011	Non-album singles
"My Cool"	2012	Non-album singles
"Can't You See"	2012	Non-album singles
"48"	2013	Non-album singles
"Kush Muzik"	2013	No Guts No Glory
"Anamachi Versace" (with Runtown)	2013	No Guts No Glory

== Guest appearances ==
List of non-single guest appearances, with other performing artists, showing year released and album name
Title	Year	Other artist(s)	Album	Release date
"Tonight"	2009	J. Martins, Runtown	Elevated	2 November 2009
"Kpo Kpo Garri"	2012	J. Martins, Runtown	Selah	26 March 2012
"Nkoli"	2012	J. Martins, Runtown	Selah	26 March 2012
"Hustler's Footsteps"	2012	Illbliss, Naeto C	Oga Boss	24 September 2012
"Black and White"	2013	Waje, Eva	W.A.J.E	1 May 2013
"Vitamin C"	2013	Kcee	Take Over	1 November 2013
"Dope Money"	2013	Olamide	Baddest Guy Ever Liveth	7 November 2013
"Surulere (Remix)"	2013	Dr Sid, Don Jazzy, Wizkid	Siduction	23 December 2013
"Foje Le (Bounce)"	2014	Phenom	The B.R.A	15 January 2014
"Kings"	2014	Yung6ix	6ix O'clock	6 February 2014
"Gbagam"	2014	Timaya, Deettii	Epiphany	25 September 2014
"In My Circle"	2014	Olamide	Street OT	14 November 2014
"Wiser"	2014	Flavour, M.I	Thankful	14 November 2014
"I Insist"	2014	9ice	CNN	7 December 2014
"Jide Ofor"	2014	Duncan Mighty	Grace & Talent	17 December 2014
"Swagger Man"	2015	Skales, Ice Prince	Man of the Year	18 May 2015
"All I See Is Me"	2015	DJ Xclusive	According to X	29 June 2015
"Bartender"	2015	Bracket	Alive	20 July 2015
"Fade Away"	2015	Joe EL	Timeless	31 July 2015
"Mary"	2015	Seyi Shay	Seyi or Shay	16 November 2015
"Ima Di Anyi Bu"	2015	Runtown	Ghetto University	23 November 2015
"Abija Wara"	2016	Lil Kesh, Chinko Ekun	Y.A.G.I	17 March 2016
"Ten Ten"	2016	J. Martins, Ycee	Authentic	21 March 2016
"Money"	2016	Patoranking	God Over Everything	1 August 2016
"Hustler's Feet"	2016	Illbliss, Vector	Illygaty:7057	31 October 2016
"Legit"	2016	Solidstar, Flavour	W.E.E.D.	31 October 2016
"Everyday"	2016	Shaydee, Ice Prince	Rhythm and Life	25 November 2016
"Sons of Anarchy"	2016	Olamide, Burna Boy	The Glory	26 December 2016
"Life is Eazi"	2017	Mr Eazi, Olamide	Life is Eazi, Vol. 1 - Accra to Lagos	10 February 2017
"Let Me Love You"	2017	Skales	The Never Say Never Guy	29 May 2017
"Loose Guard"	2017	Flavour	Ijele the Traveler	30 June 2017
"Obiageli"	2017	Kcee	Attention to Detail	24 August 2017
"Egweji"	2017	D'banj	King Don Come	25 August 2017
"On a Must Buzz"	2017	Olamide	Lagos Nawa	17 November 2017
"See Boday"	2017	D-Black	Hunger & Thirst: The Mixtape	23 December 2017
"Secret Agenda"	2018	DJ Neptune, Davido	Greatness	25 May 2018
"Jehovah"	2018	Humblesmith	Osinachi	22 June 2018
"Man"	2019	Ycee	Ycee vs. Zaheer	8 November 2019
"Uzoramaka"	2019	Praiz	King	6 December 2019
"Warlords"	2020	Olamide, Snow, Cheque, Rhatti	999	9 February 2020
"Upper Iweka"	2020	Illbliss	Illy Chapo X	29 May 2020
"Shilalo"	2020	Olamide	Carpe Diem	8 October 2020
"Green Means Go"	2021	Pappy Kojo, RJZ	Logos II	12 March 2021
"Baddest"	2021	Peruzzi, Don Jazzy	Rum & Boogie	9 April 2021
"Paulina"	2021	King Perryy	Citizen of the World	28 April 2021
"Somebody"	2021	Olamide	UY Scuti	18 June 2021
"Anymore"	2021	Victor AD	Nothing to Prove	30 July 2021
"Fada"	2021	Zlatan, Flavour	Resan	5 November 2021
"Recipe"	2021	DJ Neptune	Greatness 2.0	26 November 2021
"The Inside"	2022	M.I Abaga, The Cavemen.	The Guy	19 August 2022
"Converse"	2022	Bella Shmurda	Hypertension	26 October 2022
"Pounds & Dollars"	2022	Yemi Alade	African Baddie	2 December 2022
"Highlife Interlude"	2023	Seyi Vibez	Thy Kingdom Come	24 June 2023
"This Woman"	2024	Timi Dakolo, Falz, Cobhams Asuquo, Black Geez	The Chorus Leader	26 January 2024
"Breaking News"	2024	Jeriq, PsychoYP	Evil Twin	26 January 2024
"Popping Tonight"	2024	Falz, Shaybo	Before the Feast	7 June 2024
"Treasure"	2024	Timaya, Alpha P, Olamide	Gladiator	15 August 2024
"Yours Truly"	2024	D'banj	The Entertainer: D'Sequel	16 August 2024

== Cameo appearances ==
Title	Year	Director(s)
"Gallardo" (Runtown)	2014	Clarence Peters
"Bam Bam" (Timaya)	2018	Unlimited L.A

== Music videos ==
=== As lead artist ===
List of music videos as lead artist, showing date released and directors
Title	Video release date	Director(s)
"Multiply (Remix)" (featuring Timaya, Mr Raw, Flavour, and M.I)	18 October 2011	Clarence Peters
"Shutdown"	16 March 2012	Clarence Peters
"Ghost Mode" (featuring Olamide)	7 December 2012	Clarence Peters
"Man of the Year (Obago)"	20 August 2013	Clarence Peters
"Parcel (A Big Nwa)"	19 February 2014	Clarence Peters
"Alobam"	22 May 2014	Clarence Peters
"O Set" (featuring P-Square)	5 July 2014	Jude "Engees" Okoye
"Authe (Authentic)" (featuring Flavour)	12 September 2014	Clarence Peters
"Nme Nme"	20 October 2014	Clarence Peters
"Yayo"	5 January 2015	Clarence Peters
"Oringo"	14 April 2015	Clarence Peters
"Connect"	12 October 2015	Clarence Peters
"Asai"	26 June 2015	Clarence Peters
"Nnunu" (featuring Stormrex)	10 August 2015	Clarence Peters
"Ezege"	12 March 2016	Clarence Peters
"Fada Fada" (featuring Olamide)	13 May 2016	Clarence Peters
"E Sure for Me"	10 August 2016	Clarence Peters
"Pino Pino"	11 October 2016	Patrick Elis
"Abulo"	16 November 2016	Clarence Peters
"Financial Woman" (featuring P-Square)	6 February 2017	Clarence Peters
"Mistakes"	7 February 2017	Patrick Elis
"Okpeke" (featuring 2Baba and Flavour)	7 February 2017	Clarence Peters
"So Far So Good"	21 April 2017	Patrick Elis
"Link Up" (featuring Burna Boy and M.I)	16 May 2017	Patrick Elis
"If to Say"	21 June 2017	Unlimited L.A
"Zamo Zamo" (featuring Wande Coal)	9 August 2017	Clarence Peters
"Augment" (featuring Olamide)	6 October 2017	Unlimited L.A
"Obiagu"	7 December 2017	Unlimited L.A
"Isi Ego"	6 March 2018	Unlimited L.A
"One Chance" (featuring Kranium)	4 April 2018	Patrick Elis
"Onyeoma" (featuring Olamide)	15 May 2018	Clarence Peters
"N.W.A" (featuring Wale)	5 July 2018	Patrick Elis
"Fuwa Sewa"	20 August 2018	Clarence Peters
"Iwa" (featuring Tekno)	5 October 2018	Clarence Peters
"Iyilu Ife"	9 December 2018	Clarence Peters
"Agu"	25 March 2019	Clarence Peters
"The Bag"	8 July 2019	Patrick Elis
"Deal With It"	4 September 2019	Clarence Peters
"Ke Ife O"	11 September 2019	Patrick Elis
"Ride for You" (featuring Davido)	25 September 2019	Clarence Peters and Patrick Elis
"Ojimo"	11 October 2019	Patrick Elis
"Vibe" (featuring Flavour)	15 November 2019	Clarence Peters
"Get the Info" (featuring Falz and Phenom)	8 January 2020	Clarence Peters
"God's Willing" (featuring Runtown)	28 February 2020	TG Omori
"Oso Ga Eme"	7 April 2020	Unlimited L.A
"Speak Life (On God)"	22 May 2020	Patrick Elis
"Never"	9 October 2020	TG Omori
"For the Money" (featuring Peruzzi)	20 December 2020	TG Omori
"Bia"	9 July 2021	Patrick Elis
"Stacks"	29 October 2021	Clarence Peters
"I Do This" (featuring D Smoke)	22 November 2021	Patrick Elis
"Onye Nwa"	26 December 2021	TG Omori
"Belong to You" (featuring Peruzzi)	23 February 2022	Jaiyeola Adedamola
"Ikepentecost" (featuring Flavour)	14 April 2022	TG Omori
"Paracetamol"	13 June 2022	Patrick Elis
"Full Current (That's My Baby)" (featuring Tekno)	21 October 2022	TG Omori
"BBO (Bad Bxtches Only)"	27 October 2022	TG Omori
"Ojemba" (featuring Olamide)	4 April 2023	Patrick Elis
"Do I"	9 October 2023	Director Pink
"Do I (Remix)" (featuring Burna Boy)	10 January 2024	Pinkline Films
"Time of My Life" (featuring ArrDee)	27 September 2024	Lutch Media
"Nwoke Esike" (featuring Hushpuppi)	10 October 2024	Ochuko Lagos
"Trouble Maker"	4 November 2024	Clarence Peters
"Back Outside" (featuring Cheque)	13 December 2024	Director Pink
"Deep" (featuring Fave)	22 February 2025	Ochuko Lagos

=== As featured artist ===
List of music videos as lead artist, showing date released and directors
Title	Video release date	Director(s)	Ref.
"Turu Ugo" (Mr Raw featuring Minista Busta, Ransom, and Phyno)	18 October 2011	Patrick Elis	
"Anam Achi Kwanu" (Illbliss featuring Phyno)	29 July 2012	Clarence Peters	
"Eziokwu" (Lynxxx featuring Ikechukwu, Illbliss, and Phyno)	26 February 2013	Clarence Peters	
"Koma Roll" (Tillaman featuring Ice Prince, Iyanya, Trigga, Phyno, and Burna Boy)	1 May 2013	Patrick Elis	
"Grown Men" (DJ JoeNel featuring Phyno, Nivvy G, and Spaceman)	7 May 2013	Eddie Izycs	
"Ochanya" (Ayoola featuring Phyno)	5 August 2013	Clarence Peters	
"Voom Va" (Skuki featuring Phyno)	14 August 2013	Mazi C.I Jizzle	
"30/40" (Ruffcoin featuring Phyno)	8 December 2013	Mattmax	
"Local Boy (Remix)" (Ransome featuring Phyno)	11 April 2014	Adasa Cookey	
"Destinambari" (Mo'Cheddah featuring Phyno)	22 April 2014	Clarence Peters	
"Nsogbu" (Tha Suspect featuring Illbliss and Phyno)	1 May 2014	Clarence Peters	
"What It Do" (Laylow featuring Jesse Jagz, Phenom, Yung6ix, Olamide, Buckwylla, Sossick, Phyno, Seriki, and Liu T)	1 May 2014	Mattmax	
"Bombay" (Wizkid featuring Phyno)	13 June 2014	Patrick Elis	
"Nganga" (Mista Chivagu featuring Phyno)	4 September 2014	Paul Gambit	
"Believe" (DJ Neptune featuring Sarkodie and Phyno)	26 September 2014	Nana Kofi Asihene	
"E To Beh" (DJ Jimmy Jatt featuring Banky W. and Phyno)	30 September 2014	Clarence Peters	
"China" (Naeto C featuring Phyno and Jay Sleek)	10 October 2014	Clarence Peters	
"Rands and Nairas (Remix)" (Emmy Gee featuring Ice Prince, Cassper Nyovest, Phyno, Anatii, DJ Dimplez, and AB Crazy)	23 October 2014	Nick (Molotov Cocktail)	
"Love to Love You (Remix)" (Niyola featuring Phyno, Lynxxx, Sarkodie, and Poe)	17 November 2014	Remi Adetiba	
"Madantin (Remix)" (Jaywon featuring Phyno, May D, and Olamide)	4 December 2014	Adasa Cookey	
"Coco Butter (Remix)" (Charass featuring Davido and Phyno)	25 January 2015	Adasa Cookey	
"Taking over Me" (Yemi Alade featuring Phyno)	3 February 2015	Justin Campos and Taiye Aliyu	
"Ova Sabi" (Amarachi featuring Phyno)	19 March 2015	Clarence Peters	
"Africa (Remix)" (Blackmagic featuring Vector, Phyno, and Reminisce)	11 April 2015	Unlimited L.A	
"Ticket 2 Love" (George Nathaniel featuring J. Martins and Phyno)	25 April 2015		
"Gbagam" (Timaya featuring Deettii and Phyno)	25 April 2015	Clarence Peters	
"Local Rappers" (Reminisce featuring Olamide and Phyno)	7 May 2015	Clarence Peters	
"King Kong (Remix)" (Vector featuring Phyno, Reminisce, Classiq, and Uzi)	10 July 2015	Mattmax	
"Karishika" (Falz featuring Phyno and Chigul)	20 July 2015	Aje Filmworks	
"Pepper" (Teddy-A featuring Phyno)	5 August 2015	Patrick Elis	
"Bullion Van" (M.I featuring Phyno, Runtown, and Stormrex)	26 August 2015	Mex	
"Osinachi" (Humblesmith featuring Phyno)	11 September 2015	Adasa Cookey	
"Gbankiti" (Major Bangz featuring Phyno)	18 September 2015	Ivan EOD	
"Wiser" (Flavour featuring M.I and Phyno)	21 October 2015	Clarence Peters	
"Hoha" (Magnito featuring Phyno)	16 November 2015	Mattmax	
"Tarity" (D'Prince featuring Phyno)	25 November 2015	Don Lulu Films	
"Salambala" (Wizboyy featuring Phyno)	14 December 2015	Clarence Peters	
"Odi Okay" (Mr Raw featuring Phyno)	17 December 2015	Adasa Cookey	
"Coded Tinz" (2Baba featuring Phyno and Chief Obi)	4 February 2016	Mr. Moe Musa	
"Werey Re O (Remix)" (Base One featuring Olamide and Phyno)	8 February 2016	Frizzle and Kaffy	
"Aka Gi (Remix)" (Slow Dog featuring Phyno)	18 February 2016	Avalon Okpe	
"Mary" (Seyi Shay featuring Phyno)	29 February 2016	Meji Alabi	
"Duro Ni Be" (Burna Boy featuring Phyno)	23 May 2016	Mattmax	
"Who You Epp? (Refix)" (Olamide featuring Wande Coal and Phyno)	30 May 2016	Sesan	
"All I See Is Me" (DJ Xclusive featuring Phyno)	5 July 2016	Studio Space Pictures	
"Show Love" (Tony Wenom featuring Phyno)	1 August 2016	Aje Filmworks	
"African Lady" (Sound Sultan featuring Phyno and Flavour)	14 August 2016	Adasa Cookey	
"E Pass Go" (Skuki featuring Phyno)	2 September 2016	Clarence Peters	
"Achikolo" (Zoro featuring Phyno)	8 September 2016	Mex	
"Money" (Patoranking featuring Phyno)	29 September 2016	Sesan	
"Trillions" (Ice Prince featuring Phyno)	1 November 2016	Clarence Peters	
"Gbo Gan Gbom (Une Soul)" (Flavour featuring Phyno and Zoro)	4 November 2016	Clarence Peters	
"Follow Me Solo (Remix)" (2Sec featuring Phyno)	6 November 2016	Aje Filmworks	
"All the Loving" (General Pype featuring Burna Boy and Phyno)	10 November 2016	Mattmax	
"Money is Relevant" (Yung6ix featuring Phyno and Percy)	21 February 2017	Unlimited L.A	
"Adim Bad" (Deejay J Masta featuring Phyno)	4 March 2017		
"Lover" (Victoria Kimani featuring Phyno)	16 March 2017	Molotov	
"Testimony (Remix)" (Slow Dog featuring Phyno and TJ)	5 July 2017	Rozay	
"Blessings" (Chigul featuring Phyno and Mayorkun)	3 August 2017	Mex	
"Telli Person" (Timaya featuring Olamide and Phyno)	15 August 2017	Clarence Peters	
"Dance" (Kcee featuring Phyno)	13 September 2017	Clarence Peters	
"Loose Guard" (Flavour featuring Phyno)	15 September 2017	Patrick Elis	
"Aye" (CDQ featuring Phyno and Reminisce)	6 May 2018		
"By My Side" (DJ Derekz featuring Flavour and Phyno)	8 November 2018	Patrick Elis	
"Ani" (Deejay J Masta featuring Phyno and Flavour)	11 January 2019	Adasa Cookey	
"Double Double" (Rudeboy featuring Phyno and Olamide)	28 January 2019	Unlimited L.A	
"Feel Good" (Ice Prince featuring Falz and Phyno)	8 March 2019	Mr. Moe Musa	
"Culture" (Umu Obiligbo featuring Flavour and Phyno)	12 April 2019	Mattmax	
"La La La" (Umu Obiligbo featuring Flavour and Phyno)	19 April 2019	Olu The Wave	
"Oloun" (Mr Real featuring Phyno, Reminisce, and DJ Kaywise)	9 September 2019	Legendoreel Films	
"Holy Water" (Anjulie and Natalia Lafourcade featuring Phyno)	11 October 2019	Clément Oberto	
"Slow" (Rayvanny featuring Phyno)	20 October 2019	Mr C	
"Chop Life" (Flavour featuring Phyno)	1 September 2020	TG Omori	
"Remember (Remix)" (Jeriq featuring Phyno)	1 September 2020	TG Omori	
"Doings" (Flavour featuring Phyno)	21 December 2020	TG Omori	
"High Way" (DJ Kaywise featuring Phyno)	20 February 2021	TG Omori	
"Chupadia" (Nuno Zigi featuring Phyno)	15 May 2021		
"Egbon" (Masterkraft featuring Phyno)	9 June 2021	Clarence Peters	
"Eff All Day" (Timaya featuring Phyno)	16 August 2021	Patrick Elis	
"T.Y.B" (Del B featuring Phyno and Mufasa)	23 September 2021	Top Shooter	
"Egedege" (Masterkraft featuring Flavour, Phyno, and Theresa Onuorah)	22 October 2021	Unlimited L.A	
"Breakfast" (Ugoccie featuring Phyno)	22 April 2022	Director Pink	
"Bags" (Blaq Jerzee featuring Phyno)	9 July 2022	Naya	
"Top Mama" (Spinall featuring Reekado Banks, Phyno, and Ntosh Gazi)	13 October 2022	The Alien	
"Shame On You" (Prettyboy D-O featuring Phyno)	7 June 2024	Buhari Yesufu	
"Shutdown" (Spyro featuring Phyno)	25 June 2024	TG Omori	
"Obodo" (Larry Gaaga featuring Phyno, Flavour, and Theresa Onuorah)	1 November 2024	Director Pink	
"God Design" (Jux featuring Phyno)	7 May 2025	Kenny	
