= 12th Headies Awards =

Nigerian music industry awards

Headies 2018
- Date: 5 May 2018
- Location: Eko Convention Centre, Victoria Island, Lagos
- Hosted by: Bovi, Seyi Shay

Highlights
- Most awards: Simi, Davido, Wizkid (3 each)
- Most nominations: Simi (7) (Note: This count includes songs she was featured on.)
- Website: theheadies.com

Television/radio coverage
- Network: HipTV

The Headies 2018 was the 12th edition of The Headies. It was held on May 5, 2018, at the Eko Convention Centre in Victoria Island, Lagos. Nigerian comedian Bovi and singer Seyi Shay hosted the ceremony. After shortlisting thousands of entries submitted during the eligibility period, the organizers of the ceremony announced the nominees in April 2018. They also announced the addition of three categories: Viewer's Choice, Best Performer, and Industry Brand Supporter. Simi led the nominations with 7, followed by Wizkid and Davido with 6 each. The ceremony featured performances from a number of artists, including Falz, Mr Real, Simi, and the Danfo Drivers. Pulse Nigeria praised the award's sound production and stage design. Davido, Wizkid and Simi won the most awards with 3 each. Mayorkun won the Next Rated award, beating Dice Ailes, Maleek Berry and Johnny Drille.

== Performances ==
- Falz
- Simi
- Zule Zoo
- Danfo Drivers
- Mr Real
- Niniola

== Winners and nominees ==
Best R&B/Pop Album	Best Rap Album
Sounds from the Other Side – Wizkid; Timeless – Omawumi; Simisola – Simi; Gold – Adekunle Gold; Ijele the Traveler – Flavour; This is Me – Niniola	El-Hadj – Reminisce; 27 – Falz; Trip to the South – Erigga; The Playmaker – Phyno; The Glory – Olamide; Rose – A-Q
Best R&B Single	Best Pop Single
"Smile for Me" – Simi; "Tonight" – Nonso Amadi; "Folashade" – Praiz; "Let Me Know" – Maleek Berry; "Romeo & Juliet" –– Johnny Drille; "Love You Baby" – Banky W.	"If" – Davido; "Mad Over You" – Runtown; "All Over" – Tiwa Savage; "Yeba" – Kiss Daniel; "Iskaba" – Wande Coal and DJ Tunez; "FIA" – Davido
Best Vocal Performance (Male)	Best Vocal Performance (Female)
Praiz – "Folashade"; Faze – "Perfect Woman"; Johnny Drille – "Romeo & Juliet"; Nonso Amadi – "Tonight"; Banky W. – "Love You Baby"	Omawumi – "Butterflies"; Waje – "In the Air"; Simi – "Gone for Good"; Aramide – "Jowo"; Niniola – "Saro"; Niyola – "Where's the Love" (featuring Adekunle Gold)
Best Rap Single	Best Street-Hop Artiste
"You Rappers Should Fix Up Your Lives" – M.I Abaga; "Something Lite" – Falz (featuring Ycee); "Link Up" – Phyno (featuring Burna Boy and M.I Abaga); "Up To You" – Show Dem Camp (featuring Funbi); "Me Versus Me" – Ice Prince	Small Doctor – "Penalty"; Olamide – "Wo"; CDQ – "Sai Baba"; Idowest – "Shepeteri" (featuring Dammy Krane and Slimcase; Skuki – "Pass the Agbara"; Mr Real – "Legbegbe" (featuring Idowest, Kelvin Chuks and Obadice)
Best Collabo	Lyricist on the Roll
"Ma Lo" – Tiwa Savage (featuring Wizkid); "Temper" (Remix) – Skales (featuring Burna Boy); "Juice" – Ycee (featuring Maleek Berry); "No Forget" – Adekunle Gold (featuring Simi); "Come Closer" – Wizkid (featuring Drake)	M.I Abaga – "You Rappers Should Fix Up Your Lives"; A-Q – "Political Science"; Boogey – "Liquor Night"; Erigga – "Industry Nite"
Song of the Year	Best Recording of the Year
"If" – Davido; "Penalty" – Small Doctor; "Wo" – Olamide; "Yeba" – Kiss Daniel; "Mad Over You" – Runtown; "FIA" – Davido	"Joromi" – Simi; "Butterflies" – Omawumi; "Halleluyah" – Funbi; "Ponmile" – Reminisce; "Heaven" – Banky W.
Album of the Year	Artiste of the Year
Simisola – Simi; Gold – Adekunle Gold; Klĭtôrĭs – Brymo; Ijele the Traveler – Flavour; Sounds from the Other Side – Wizkid; The Playmaker – Phyno	Davido; Wizkid; Olamide; Simi; Tiwa Savage
Producer of the Year	Best Music Video
Kiddominant – "Fall", "Mama"; Spellz – "Iskaba", "Ma Lo"; Tekno – "If", "Rara"; Sarz – "Maradona", "Come Closer"; Masterkraft – "Yawa", "Virtuous Woman"	"Come Closer" by Wizkid (featuring Drake) – Daps; "Ma Lo" by Tiwa Savage (featuring Wizkid) – Meji Alabi; "Focus" by Humblesmith – Clarence Peters; "Been Calling" by Maleek Berry – Meji Alabi; "Yolo" by Seyi Shay – Meji Alabi; "Like Dat" by Davido – Daps
Next Rated	African Artiste of the Year
Mayorkun; Maleek Berry; Dice Ailes; Johnny Drille; Zoro	Nasty C; Sarkodie; Cassper Nyovest; Sauti Sol; Vanessa Mdee
Viewer's Choice	Best Performer
Wizkid – "Come Closer" (featuring Drake); Davido – "If"; Olamide – "Wo"; Runtown – "Mad Over You"; Kiss Daniel – "Yeba"; Tekno – "Yawa"	Yemi Alade; Flavour; Falz; M.I Abaga; 2Baba; Tiwa Savage
Rookie of the Year	Best Reggae/Dancehall Single
Teni; Air Boy; Junior Boy; Peruzzi	"Holy Holy" – 2Baba; "Love You Die" – Patoranking (featuring Diamond Platnumz); "Dance" – Timaya (featuring Rudeboy); "Rock Your Body" – Burna Boy; "Come Closer" – Wizkid (featuring Drake); "Sofa" – Kiss Daniel
Best Alternative Song	Hip Hop World Revelation of the Year
"FunMi Lowo" (Remix) – Aramide (featuring Sound Sultan and Koker); "Money" – Adekunle Gold; "Radio" – Nonso Amadi; "Romeo & Juliet" – Johnny Drille; "Ponmile" – Reminisce; "Lagos Barbie" – Bantu	Reekado Banks; Niniola; Adekunle Gold; Mr Eazi
Special Recognition Award	Hall of Fame
Kaffy	Chris Ubosi
