= JaySynths =

Nigerian record producer

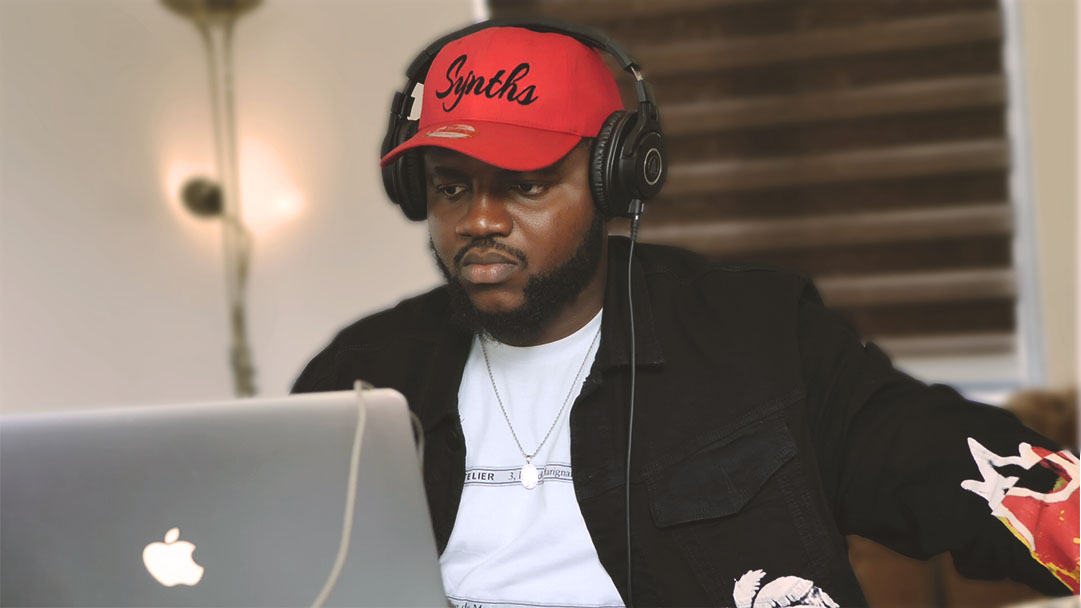

Background information
- Born: Chisom Obinna Onyeke; 27 October 1988 (age 37); Onitsha, Anambra State, Nigeria
- Genres: Afrobeats; Hip hop
- Occupations: Record producer, sound engineer
- Instruments: Keyboard, Bass guitar, Drums

Chisom Obinna Onyeke (born 27 October 1988), known professionally as JaySynths, is a Nigerian record producer and sound engineer best known for producing Teni's hit single "Case" in 2018. He is the originating record producer of Ojapiano and the first record producer to produce it, a fusion of the Igbo people’s Ọjà and South African sub genre of house music Amapiano, taking its name from Ọjà and Piano, he is also the producer behind the soundtracks of 2023 Netflix number 1 movie, Shanty Town.

== Early life and education ==
JaySynths was born and raised in Onitsha, Anambra State, Nigeria. He began his education at All Saints Primary School, Onitsha, before preceding to Government Secondary School, Karshi, Abuja. He graduated from University of Abuja with a degree in political science.

== Music career ==
At the age of four, JaySynths started playing musical instruments such as the Keyboard at his parent church. After his family moved to Abuja, he began his career in music production and was later appointed the music director of a choir. JaySynths has produced songs such as "Case" which won Best Pop Single at The Headies 2019, and its cover titled “Upgrade" which was performed by Nigerian musician Snazzy the Optimist. Other singles he has produced include "Wait", "Fake Jersey", "Marry" and "Power Rangers" by Teni, "Daz How Star Do" by Skiibii. He has worked with Ice Prince, Victor AD, Mr Eazi, Broda Shaggi and Sarkodie.

== Personal life ==
JaySynths is married to an ex-beauty queen, Christy Daniels, whom he met during his undergraduate days in the university. They have one child together.

== Awards ==
| Year | Award | Category | Result | Ref. |
|---|---|---|---|---|
| 2020 | 2020 Soundcity MVP Awards | African Producer of the Year | Nominated | |
| 2023 | AMVCA Awards | Best Soundtrack - Shanty Town | Nominated | |
