= The Headies Award for Hip Hop World Revelation of the Year =

Nigerian music award

- Awarded for: Best New Artiste with a debut album adjudged to be outstanding in terms of artistic quality and impact within the year under review
- Country: Nigeria
- Presented by: Hip Hop World Magazine
- First award: 2006
- Website: theheadies.com

The Headies Award for Hip Hop World Revelation of the Year is an award presented at The Headies, a ceremony that was established in 2006 and originally called the Hip Hop World Awards. (Note: The nominees for the 2006 edition are not included in the Recipients table because they are not available.) It was first presented to Soul E in 2006.

== Recipients ==
Hip Hop World Revelation of the Year
Year	Nominees	Result
2020	Fireboy DML	Won
2020	Rema	Nominated
2020	Joeboy	Nominated
2020	Teni	Nominated
2020	Chike	Nominated
2020	Victor AD	Nominated
2019	Mayorkun	Won
2019	Odunsi (The Engine)	Nominated
2019	Humblesmith	Nominated
2019	Wurld	Nominated
2018	Reekado Banks	Won
2018	Niniola	Nominated
2018	Adekunle Gold	Nominated
2018	Mr Eazi	Nominated
2016	Kiss Daniel	Won
2016	Seyi Shay	Nominated
2016	Lil Kesh	Nominated
2016	Runtown	Nominated
2015	Yemi Alade	Won
2015	Praiz	Nominated
2015	Skales	Nominated
2014	Kcee	Won
2014	Tiwa Savage	Nominated
2014	Sean Tizzle	Nominated
2014	Burna Boy	Nominated
2013	Davido	Won
2013	Waje	Nominated
2013	D'Prince	Nominated
2013	Capital Femi	Nominated
2013	Banky W.	Nominated
2012	Wizkid	Won
2012	Ice Prince	Nominated
2012	Bez	Nominated
2012	Timi Dakolo	Nominated
2012	Olamide	Nominated
2011	Dr SID	Won
2011	Mo'Cheddah	Nominated
2011	Jesse Jagz	Nominated
2011	YQ	Nominated
2011	Lynxxx	Nominated
2010	Wande Coal	Won
2010	Kel	Nominated
2010	Djinee	Nominated
2010	Illbliss	Nominated
2010	Omawumi	Nominated
2009	M.I	Won
2009	Banky W.	Nominated
2009	Naeto C	Nominated
2009	Nikki Laoye	Nominated
2008	9ice	Won
2008	Aṣa	Nominated
2008	TY Bello	Nominated
2008	Olu Maintain	Nominated
2008	Sasha	Nominated
2007	Soul E	Won
2007	FreeStyle	Nominated
2007	Mr Raw	Nominated
2007	Ikechukwu	Nominated
2007	Obiwon	Nominated
2007	Darey	Nominated
2006	D'banj	Won
