= 13th Headies Awards =

Nigerian music industry awards

Headies 2019
- Date: 19 October 2019
- Location: Eko Convention Centre, Victoria Island, Lagos
- Hosted by: Reminisce, Nancy Isime

Highlights
- Most awards: Teni (4)
- Most nominations: Burna Boy (10)
- Website: theheadies.com

Television/radio coverage
- Network: HipTV

The Headies 2019 was the thirteenth edition of The Headies. It was held on October 19, 2019, at the Eko Convention Centre in Victoria Island, Lagos. Themed "Power of a Dream", the ceremony was hosted by rapper Reminisce and actress Nancy Isime. After shortlisting thousands of entries submitted between January 2018 and June 2019, the organizers of the ceremony announced the nominees on 1 October 2019. Burna Boy set a record for the most nominations in one night with 10 nominations. Teni followed with 6 and Wizkid with 5. The ceremony featured performances from a number of artists, including Styl-Plus, Sunny Neji, Duncan Mighty, Teni and Victor AD. Teni won the most awards with 4. Rema won the Next Rated award, beating Fireboy DML, Joeboy, Lyta, Victor AD and Zlatan.

== Performances ==
- Styl-Plus
- Sunny Neji
- Zaki Adzay
- Victor AD
- Wurld
- Teni
- Duncan Mighty
- Rema

== Presenters ==
- Tobi Bakre – presented the award for Rookie of the Year
- Wale Animashaun and Vivian – presented the award for Best Vocal Performance (Female)
- Nancy Isime – presented the award for Best Vocal Performance (Male)
- Nancy Isime – presented the award for Best Street Hop Artiste
- The Organizers – presented the award for Best Recording of the Year
- IK Ogbonna – presented the award for Best Rap Single
- Osi Suave – presented the award for Best Alternative Song
- Tony Tetuila – presented the award for Best Rap Album
- Ruggedman – presented the award for Lyricist On The Roll
- Bam Bam and Teddy A – presented the award for Best Collabo
- Gbemi Olateru Olagbegi – presented the award for Best Performer
- Kemi Smallz and DJ Sose – presented the award for Best R&B Single
- Toke Makinwa and Ebuka Obi-Uchendu – presented the award for Best Pop Single
- Dr SID and Ubi Franklin – presented the award for Best R&B/Pop Album
- Mercy and Mike – presented the award for Viewer's Choice
- Tacha, Tee-Y Mix and Venita – presented the award for Best Music Video
- Bovi and DJ Cuppy – presented the award for Hip Hop World Revelation of the Year
- The Organizers – presented the award for Album of the Year
- Dénola Grey – presented the award for Producer of the Year
- Martin Gaone Mabutho – presented the Special Recognition Award
- GAC Motor representatives – presented the Next Rated award
- STAR Lager representative – presented the award for Song of the Year
- Rita Daniels – presented the award for Artiste of the Year

== Winners and nominees ==
Best R&B/Pop Album	Best Rap Album
The Mayor of Lagos – Mayorkun; rare. – Odunsi (The Engine); Outside – Burna Boy; No Bad Songz – Kizz Daniel; About 30 – Adekunle Gold	Moral Instruction – Falz; Crown – A-Q and Loose Kaynon; A Study On Self Worth: Yxng Dxnzl – M.I Abaga; Clone Wars, Vol. IV (These Buhari Times) – Show Dem Camp
Best R&B Single	Best Pop Single
"Gimme Love" – Seyi Shay (featuring Runtown); "Tipsy" – Odunsi (The Engine) (featuring Raye); "Serenade" – Funbi; "Uyo Meyo" – Teni; "Wishes and Butterflies" – Wurld	"Case" – Teni; "Ye" – Burna Boy; "Fake Love" – Starboy (featuring Duncan Mighty, Wizkid); "Jealous" – Fireboy DML; "Baby" – Joeboy
Best Vocal Performance (Male)	Best Vocal Performance (Female)
Wurld – "Wishes and Butterflies"; Tay Iwar – "Utero"; Johnny Drille – "Finding Efe"; Nonso Bassey – "411"; Funbi – "Serenade"	Teni – "Uyo Meyo"; GoodGirl LA – "Bless me"; Waje – "Udue"; Tems – "Mr Rebel"; Falana – "Repeat"
Best Rap Single	Best Street-Hop Artiste
"Talk" – Falz; "We Don't Do That Over Here" – Hotyce; "40 ft Container" – Illbliss (featuring Olamide); "Sacrifice" – Payper Corleone (featuring Alpha Ojini); "Gang Gang" – A-Q (featuring Loose Kaynon)	Chinko Ekun – "Able God"; Erigga – "Motivation"; Zlatan Ibile – "Legwork"; Barry Jhay – "Aiye"; Lyta – "Time"
Best Collabo	Lyricist on the Roll
"Killin Dem" – Burna Boy (featuring Zlatan Ibile); "Like" – Reekado Banks (featuring Tiwa Savage, Fiokee); "One Ticket" – Kiss Daniel (featuring Davido); "Fake Love" – Starboy (featuring Duncan Mighty, Wizkid); "Amaka" – 2Baba (featuring Peruzzi)	A-Q – "Crown"; Ycee – "Balance"; Boogey – "Implode"; Paybac – "Implode"; Ghost – "Crown"; Tec – "Crown"
Song of the Year	Best Recording of the Year
"Ye" – Burna Boy; "Dumebi" – Rema; "Wetin We Gain" – Victor AD; "Fake Love" – Starboy (featuring Duncan Mighty, Wizkid); "Case" – Teni; "Legwork" – Zlatan Ibile; "Baby" – Joeboy; "Jealous" – Fireboy DML	"Uyo Meyo" – Teni; "Ire" – Adekunle Gold; "Olanrewaju" – Brymo; "Heal D World" – Patoranking; "Ye" – Burna Boy
Album of the Year	Artiste of the Year
Moral Instruction – Falz; About 30 – Adekunle Gold; Outside – Burna Boy; No Bad Songz – Kizz Daniel	Burna Boy; Wizkid; Davido; Falz; Tiwa Savage
Producer of the Year	Best Music Video
Killertunes – "Fake Love" by Starboy (featuring Duncan Mighty, Wizkid); Phantom – "Ye" by Burna Boy; Ozedikus – "Dumebi" by Rema; Spellz – "Askamaya" by Teni; Kel-P – "Killin Dem" by Burna Boy (featuring Zlatan Ibile)	"Dangote" by Burna Boy – Clarence Peters; "Available" by Patoranking – Clarence Peters; "Ire" by Adekunle Gold – Aje Films; "Talk" by Falz – Prodigeezy; "Jaiye" by Ladipoe – 88 Factor
Next Rated	African Artiste Recognition
Rema; Lyta; Victor AD; Fireboy DML; Joeboy; Zlatan Ibile	(Ghana) King Promise – "CCTV"; (South Africa) Master KG – "Skeleton Moves"; (Ivory Coast) Afro B – "Drogba (Joanna)"; (Kenya) Sauti Sol – "Melanin"; (South Africa) DJ Maphorisa – "iWalk Ye Phara"
Viewer's Choice	Best Performer
Teni; Mr Eazi; Fireboy DML; Joeboy; Rema; Burna Boy; Wizkid; Davido	Yemi Alade; Brymo; Adekunle Gold; Falz; Tiwa Savage
Rookie of the Year	Best Alternative Song
Barry Jhay; Crayon; Oxlade; Buju	"Finding Efe" – Johnny Drille; "Heya" – Brymo; "Ire" – Adekunle Gold; "Cash" – Lady Donli; "Mr Rebel" – Tems
Hip Hop World Revelation of the Year	Special Recognition Award
Mayorkun; Odunsi (The Engine); Humblesmith; Wurld	Paul Okoye of One Africa
