= Etins Records =

Nigerian record label

- Founded: 2017
- Founder: Edwin Etinosa Ehiorobo
- Status: Active
- Genre: Various
- Country of origin: Nigeria
- Location: Lagos
- Official website: www.etinsrecord.com

Etins Records is a Nigerian record label founded by Edwin Etinosa Ehiorobo. The label is home to Yarden, Morien and formerly Victor AD.

== History ==
Etins Records was established in December, 2017. "Wetin You Gain" was the first major release from the record label in July, 2018. The song received positive reviews from music critics including Joey Akan and was subsequently nominated for a Headies award in 2019 as Song of the Year. The record label had additional success with Victor AD with the release of "Tire You" featuring Davido in 2019.

Etins Record released the self-titled debut EP from Morien in 2019 and "Maria" as a standout single. Morien has since released additional EPs and singles under the label. The record label, also home to Yarden released "Wetin" in November 2022, with the song making appearances in several African charts including peaking at number in spotify viral chart (Nigeria) while also becoming a viral song on tiktok.

== Artists ==
=== Current acts ===
Act	Year signed	Releases under the label
Morien	2019	6
Yarden	2020	3

=== Former ===
- Victor AD
- Swayvee
