= Full Time Job (album) =

Studio album by Phyno
- Released: 4 October 2024
- Recorded: April 2023–2024
- Genres: Hip-hop; highlife; R&B; gospel
- Length: 42:06
- Languages: Igbo; Nigerian Pidgin; English
- Label: Penthauze
- Producers: JaySynths; Niphkeys; Major Bangz; Duktor Sett

Phyno chronology
| Something to Live For (2021) | Full Time Job (2024) |

Singles from Full Time Job
- 1. "Do I" Released: 1 September 2023; 2. "Do I (Remix)" Released: 20 December 2023; 3. "Time of My Life" Released: 29 September 2024; 4. "Back Outside" Released: 9 December 2024; 5. "Deep" Released: 20 February 2025

Full Time Job is the fifth studio album by Nigerian rapper Phyno. It was released on 4 October 2024, through Penthauze Music. The album blends rap, highlife, R&B, and gospel, and features guest appearances from artists ArrDee, Flavour, Chip, Burna Boy, Johnny Drille, Fave, Cheque, group NSG, and media personality and convicted felon Hushpuppi. Production was handled mainly by JaySynths, with additional production from Major Bangz, Niphkeys, and Duktor Sett. The album serves as a follow-up to Something to Live For (2021).

== Background ==
In early 2023, Phyno began work on a new album but scrapped the initial songs, choosing to start over. It was not until around April 2023 that he felt he had enough material to shape what would become Full Time Job. He revealed the tracklist for the album on 1 October 2024.

== Singles ==
The album's lead single "Do I" was released on 1 September 2023. Produced by JaySynths, the track has a confident and defiant tone, with Phyno using blunt lyrics to express his unapologetic attitude. "Do I" was the first single Phyno released after taking time off from music to be a father after his first child's birth in August 2023. Burna Boy features on the remix to "Do I", which was released as the album's second single on 20 December 2023. The third single "Time of My Life" features British rapper ArrDee and was released on 27 September 2024. Also produced by JaySynths, the song focuses on success, confidence, and enjoying life.

The Cheque-assisted "Back Outside" was released as the album's fourth single on 9 December 2024. Its music video, directed by Director Pink, was released two days later and alternates between a carnival featuring marching bands, cheerleaders, and bouncy houses and a bar scene featuring cameos from Nigerian socialites Cubana Chief Priest and Yhemolee. On 20 February 2025, "Deep" featuring Fave was released as the album's fifth single, alongside its music video.

== Critical reception ==
Professional ratings
Review scores
| Source | Rating |
|---|---|
| NotJustOk | 7.8/10 |
| Top Charts Africa | 8/10 |
| Pulse Nigeria | 8.5/10 |

Adeayo Adebiyi of Pulse Nigeria described Full Time Job as "a fine collection of well-arranged songs that hold up Phyno's genius and reflect Nigerian music diversity," praising JaySynths's "exquisite" production and rating it an 8.5/10. Ademoye Afeez of NotJustOk called the album "cohesive, on-brand, and culturally rich," commending its production, direction, and Phyno's versatility. He rated it a 7.8/10 and said it was "easily one of the year's best projects from a Nigerian rapper." Kehinde Adesokan of Top Charts Africa praised Full Time Job as a "masterfully crafted body of work, showcasing exceptional production quality and profound lyrical insight", rating it an 8/10.

== Track listing ==
Full Time Job track listing
| No. | Title | Writer(s) | Producer(s) | Length |
|---|---|---|---|---|
| 1. | "It's Nothing" | Chibuzor Azubuike; Emma Odia | Major Bangz | 2:30 |
| 2. | "Back Outside" (featuring Cheque) | Azubuike; Akanbi Brett | JaySynths | 3:05 |
| 3. | "Eyes On Dem" (featuring Chip) | Azubuike; Jahmaal Fyffe | Duktor Sett | 2:38 |
| 4. | "Do I" | Azubuike | JaySynths | 2:35 |
| 5. | "Deep" (featuring Fave) | Azubuike; Chidozie Ugochinyere | JaySynths | 3:05 |
| 6. | "Time of My Life" (featuring ArrDee) | Azubuike; Riley Davies | JaySynths | 2:35 |
| 7. | "Nwayo Nwayo" | Azubuike | JaySynths | 2:39 |
| 8. | "Men Don Show Face" (featuring Flavour) | Azubuike; Chinedu Okoli | JaySynths | 3:02 |
| 9. | "Grateful" | Azubuike | JaySynths | 2:49 |
| 10. | "Nwoke Esike" (interlude) (featuring Hushpuppi) | Azubuike; Ramon Abbas | Niphkeys | 3:21 |
| 11. | "Trouble Maker" | Azubuike | JaySynths | 2:21 |
| 12. | "Pinterest" (featuring NSG) | Azubuike; Dennis Awotwe-Mensah; William Awotwe-Mensah; Matthew Ojo; Patrick Brew; Abdul-Jalaal Arowosaye; Ayodeji Shekoni | Major Bangz | 3:50 |
| 13. | "Do I" (remix; featuring Burna Boy) | Azubuike; Damini Ogulu | JaySynths | 2:18 |
| 14. | "Sweet Karma" (featuring Johnny Drille) | Azubuike; John Ighodaro | JaySynths | 2:48 |
| 15. | "Anthem Ndi Eze" | Azubuike | JaySynths | 2:26 |
| Total length: | | | | 42:06 |

== Personnel ==
=== Performing artists ===
- Chibuzor "Phyno" Azubuike - vocals, writer
- Dennis "OGD" Awotwe-Mensah (of NSG) - vocals, writer
- William "Kruddz" Awotwe-Mensah (of NSG) - vocals, writer
- Matthew "Mojo" Ojo (of NSG) - vocals, writer
- Patrick "Dope" Brew (of NSG) - vocals, writer
- Abdul-Jalaal "Abz" Arowosaye (of NSG) - vocals, writer
- Ayodeji "Mxjib" Shekoni (of NSG) - vocals, writer
- Chinedu "Flavour" Okoli - vocals, writer
- Damini "Burna Boy" Ogulu - vocals, writer
- Ramon "Hushpuppi" Abbas - vocals, writer
- Riley "ArrDee" Davies - vocals, writer
- John "Johnny Drille" Ighodaro - vocals, writer
- Chidozie "Fave" Ugochinyere - vocals, writer
- Jahmaal "Chip" Fyffe - vocals, writer
- Akanbi "Cheque" Brett - vocals, writer

=== Production and engineering ===
- Michael "Major Bangz" Archibong - producer, writer
- Chisom "JaySynths" Onyeke - producer
- Adebajo "Niphkeys" Adebanjo - producer
- Saviour "Duktor Sett" Ezeoke - producer
- Alex Solano - spatial mixing engineer, spatial mastering engineer

== Release history ==
Release history and formats for Full Time Job
| Region | Date | Format | Label |
|---|---|---|---|
| Various | 4 October 2024 | Streaming; digital download | Penthauze |
