= Nothing to Prove =

Nothing to Prove may refer to:

- Nothing to Prove (Jeffries Fan Club album)
- Nothing to Prove (H_{2}O album)
- Nothing to Prove (EP), a 2021 EP by Victor AD
- "Nothing to Prove" (Doubleclicks song)
- "Nothing to Prove", a song by Lonestar from the album Mountains
- Nuthin' 2 Prove, third studio album by Lil Yachty
