= Yarden (singer) =

Nigerian singer

- Also known as: Yarden
- Born: Okereke Blessed Jordan; 2 August 2000 (age 26); Abia State, Nigeria
- Genre: Afrobeats
- Occupations: Singer; songwriter
- Instrument: Keyboard
- Years active: 2020–present
- Label: Etins Records

Okereke Blessed Jordan (born 2 August 2000), known professionally as Yarden is a Nigerian singer and songwriter. He is known for his single Wetin which went viral on TikTok earning him a debut on the TurnTable charts NXT Emerging Top Artistes at 9 for a total of 17 weeks.

== Early life ==
Yarden hails from Abia State and raised in Lagos State, where he attended his primary and secondary education, he attended St Anthony Primary school and Millennium Secondary school then further his studies at Yaba College of Technology in Lagos. Yarden started singing in church and gradually start taking music seriously at school where he often attend rap battles and shows.

== Career ==
On August 4, 2020, Yarden was signed to Etins Records. In November 2022 he released his single titled "Wetin" which went viral on TikTok earning him a debut on the TurnTable charts NXT Emerging Top Artistes at 9 for a total of 17 weeks. On July 14, 2022, his single "Wetin" was listed among the top 10 most underrated Nigerian songs by The Nation and end of the year top songs of 2022 by The Guardian it has surpassed 54 million streams on Spotify as at 5 January 2025. On January 27, 2023, he was among the top 5 trending Nigerian musicians on Audiomack. On 5 December 2023 he released his debut EP titled The One Who Descends which features Swayvee and Morien and received positive critical reviews.

== Discography ==
=== EP ===
- The One Who Descends (2023)

=== Singles ===
- "Wild" (2020)
- "FL3X" (2022)
- "Wetin" (2022)
- "Busy Body" (2023)
- "Wait" (2024)
- "Wait (Sped Up)" (2024)

=== Albums ===
- "ANGEL" (2026)
