= The Headies Award for Lyricist on the Roll =

Nigerian music industry award

- Awarded for: The rapper with the best lyrical depth and performance on a single song or album in the year under review
- Country: Nigeria
- Presented by: Hip Hop World Magazine
- First award: 2006
- Final award: 2019
- Website: theheadies.com

The Headies Award for Lyricist on the Roll is an award presented at The Headies, a ceremony that was established in 2006 and originally called the Hip Hop World Awards. It was first presented to Mode 9 in 2006, the category is one of six categories not open to public voting.

== Recipients ==
Lyricist on the Roll
| Year | Nominees | Result |
|---|---|---|
| 2020 | "Country" – Illbliss | Won |
| 2020 | "Eunice" – A-Q | Nominated |
| 2020 | "Define Rap 2" – Blaqbonez | Nominated |
| 2020 | "Trinity" – M.I | Nominated |
| 2020 | "Get The Info" – Phenom | Nominated |
| 2020 | "Speak Life" – Phyno | Nominated |
| 2019 | "Crown" – A-Q | Won |
| 2019 | "Balance" – Ycee | Nominated |
| 2019 | "Implode" – Boogey | Nominated |
| 2019 | "Implode" – Paybac | Nominated |
| 2019 | "Crown" – Ghost | Nominated |
| 2019 | "Crown" – Tec | Nominated |
| 2018 | "You Rappers Should Fix Up Your Lives" – M.I | Won |
| 2018 | "Political Science" – A-Q | Nominated |
| 2018 | "Liquor Night" – Boogey | Nominated |
| 2018 | "Industry Nite" – Erigga | Nominated |
| 2016 | "Chukwu Agozi Gogi" – Illbliss | Won |
| 2016 | "Asamalekun" – Reminisce | Nominated |
| 2016 | "Jagaban" – Ycee | Nominated |
| 2016 | "No Matter What" – Mode 9 | Nominated |
| 2016 | "Agu Ji Ndi Men" – A-Q | Nominated |
| 2016 | "Show You Something" – Boogey | Nominated |
| 2015 | "King Kong" – Vector | Won |
| 2015 | "Bank Alert" – Illbliss | Nominated |
| 2015 | "Baba Hafusa" – Reminisce | Nominated |
| 2015 | "T.R" – G.O.D | Nominated |
| 2014 | "God on the Mic" – Jesse Jagz | Won |
| 2014 | "Kpansh" – Yung6ix | Nominated |
| 2014 | "Shots on Shots" – Ice Prince and Sarkodie | Nominated |
| 2014 | "Rap It Up" – Posly TD | Nominated |
| 2013 | "Let It Go" – Mode 9 | Won |
| 2013 | "Voice of the Streets" – Olamide | Nominated |
| 2013 | "Sanctum" – Boogey | Nominated |
| 2013 | "Man of the Year" – Phyno | Nominated |
| 2012 | "Angeli" – Vector | Won |
| 2012 | "Too Much Money" – Iceberg Slim | Nominated |
| 2012 | "Shutdown" – Phyno | Nominated |
| 2012 | "Oh My Gosh" – Yung6ix | Nominated |
| 2012 | "Mo Street Gan" – Erigga | Nominated |
| 2011 | "Rhyme Tight" – Mode 9 | Won |
| 2011 | "Oleku" – Ice Prince | Nominated |
| 2011 | "Boys Are Not Smiling" – Terry Tha Rapman | Nominated |
| 2011 | "Undisputed" – M.I | Nominated |
| 2011 | "Get Down" – Vector | |
| 2010 | "Bad Man" – Mode 9 | Won |
| 2010 | "Somebody Wants to Die" – M.I | Nominated |
| 2010 | "Sample (Remix)" – Pherowshuz | Nominated |
| 2010 | "Got to Love Me" – OD | Nominated |
| 2009 | "Nine" – Mode 9 | Won |
| 2009 | "Talk About it" – M.I | Nominated |
| 2009 | "Esa Lo Ba De" – Lord of Ajasa | Nominated |
| 2009 | "Pon Pon Pon" – Da Grin | Nominated |
| 2008 | "Contradiction" - Mode 9 | Won |
| 2008 | "Crowd Mentality" - M.I | Nominated |
| 2008 | "Ruggedy Baba" – Ruggedman | Nominated |
| 2008 | "Only 4 Naija" – Terry tha Rapman | Nominated |
| 2007 (Note: The nominees and winner's song name for the 2007 edition are not included in the Recipients table because they are not available yet.) | "-" – Mode 9 | Won |
| 2006 (Note: The nominees and winner's song name for the 2006 edition are not included in the Recipients table because they are not available yet.) | "-" – Mode 9 | Won |

== Category records ==
Most wins

| Rank | 1st | 2nd | 3rd |
|---|---|---|---|
| Artist | Mode 9 | Vector | Jesse Jagz; Illbliss; M.I; A-Q |
| Total wins | 7 Wins | 2 Wins | 1 Win |

Most nominations

| Rank | 1st | 2nd | 3rd | 4th |
|---|---|---|---|---|
| Artist | Mode 9 | M.I Abaga | Boogey; A-Q | Vector; Illbliss; Phyno |
| Total noms. | 8 noms. | 6 noms. | 4 noms. | 3 noms. |
