= Erigga =

Nigeria rapper and singer

- Also known as: PaperBoi, 2 seconds, Eribaba, New Money
- Born: Erhiga Agarivbie; 30 March 1987 (age 39); Warri, Delta, Nigeria
- Genre: Hip hop
- Occupations: Rapper; singer
- Years active: 2008–present
- Labels: Area to the World; Emirate Empire

Erhiga Agarivbie (born 30 March 1987), better known by his stage name Erigga, is a Nigerian rapper and singer born and raised in Delta State.

== Early life and education ==
Erhiga Agarivbie was born on 30 March 1987 in Warri, Delta State, where he grew up with his family. He is the first of five children. He attended Standard International School for both primary and secondary levels.

== Career ==
Erigga began his music career in early 2010. He has worked with several producers, including Mr Nolimit, C Major, Beatsbymellow, and Even Prinx Emmanuel. Erigga's first musical release was "Mo Street Gan". The music video for the song was shot in Nigeria, directed by AKIN Alabi. The song became Radio Continental's theme song.

In 2013, Erigga released "Coupé Décalé ft Shuun Bebe". TV stations endorsed the music video for the song in Nigeria. In early 2014, he released another single titled "Love No Be Garri", featuring Jimoh Waxiu.

On 17 July 2017 Erigga released his album A Trip To The South which includes Orezi, Skales, Duncan Mighty, and many others. In 2018, Erigga released another hit single titled "Motivation" featuring Victor AD. This song has gained over a million views on YouTube.

In 2019, Erigga released his project "The Erigma 2" Album in 2019. The body of work, "The Erigma 2" has 18 tracks with guest appearances from Victor AD, Zlatan, Magnito, MI Abaga, Ice Prince, Vector and others. "The Erigma 2" has production credits given to Mr Nolimit, C Major, KO Beat, Kulboy Beats, Doka Shot, Lex Amazing, Prinx Emmanuel and co-productions from Beatsbymellow. The Album was mixed and mastered by Mr Nolimit.

In 2025, he won Best Rap Album at The Headies for "Family Time"

== Awards and nominations ==
Year	Event	Prize	Nominated work	Result	Ref
2025	The Headies	Best Rap Album	"Family Time" by Erigga	Won	
2019	The Headies	Best Street Hop Artiste	Erigga for "Motivation" (feat. Victor AD)	Nominated	
2012	The Headies	Best Street Hop Artiste	Erigga for "Mo Street Gan"	Nominated	
2012	The Headies	Lyricist on the Roll	Erigga for "Mo Street Gan"	Nominated	

== Discography ==
=== Studio albums ===
List of studio albums, with selected details
Title	Details
The Erigma	Release:28 February, 2019; The Erigma: Label: No.1 Sound Limited; Format: CD, Digital download
Okorowanta	Release: 1 May 2018; Label: No.1 Sound Limited; Format: CD, Digital download
A Trip to The South	Release: 17 July 2017; Label: Emirate Empire; Format: CD, Digital download
The Erigma II	Release: 4 October 2019; Label: Emirate Empire; Format: CD, Digital download
Before The Chaos EP	Release: 14 May 2021; Label: Emirate Empire; Format: CD, Digital download
Family Time	Release: 27 October 2023; Label: Greatness Musiq; Format: CD, Digital download
