= Zule Zoo =

Musical group

Zule Zoo was a Nigerian music duo formed in the late 1990s by Michael Aboh and Al-Hassan Ibrahim, both from Benue State. They were known for their fusion of different musical genres such as traditional Nigerian rhythms, hip-hop, and reggae.

They became known after the success of their controversial hit song “Kerewa”, which was banned by the Nigerian Broadcasting Commission (NBC) for obscene content. They were one of the top musical groups in Nigeria in the early 2000s, with their unique dance steps. Zule Zoo performed at the 2018 Headies.

== Separation ==
The duo split up in 2008, after Aboh released a solo album titled “E Dey Pain Me”. Since then, they went silent musically.

== Death ==
In 2022, Aboh died after slumping in the bathroom while having his bath. Zule Zoo is remembered as one of the pioneers of the Takuraku beat, which showcased Nigerian culture through creativity in lyrical composition and innovative use of African percussion instruments.

== See also ==
- List of Nigerian musicians
