= Case (song) =

2018 song by Teni

Single by Teni
- Released: October 19, 2018
- Recorded: 2018
- Genre: Afrobeats
- Length: 3:22
- Label: Dr Dolor Entertainment
- Songwriter: Teniola Apata
- Producer: JaySynths

Teni singles chronology
"Shake Am" (2018)	"Case" (2018)	"Pray" (2018)

Music video
- "Case" on YouTube

"Case" is a song by Nigerian singer Teni. Produced by Jaysynths, it was officially released on October 19, 2018. The song won Best Pop Single at The Headies 2019.

== Background and composition ==
"Case" is a mid-tempo Afrobeats track that was produced by Jaysynths. Recorded primarily in Nigerian pidgin, its lyrics revolve around a girl going the extra mile to get the attention of her love interest. In 2019, Teni was featured on YouTube's Artist on the Rise platform. As a result of the recognition, her videos were promoted on YouTube's U.S trending page, in social media ads, and at fan event appearances.

== Video and performance ==
The accompanying music video for "Case" was shot and directed by Director K outside Nigeria. As of November 2019, the video has surpassed 18 million views on YouTube.

In September 2019, Teni performed "Case" during an event attended by Aliko Dangote in New York. Teni also performed the song at The Headies 2019 awards ceremony. Moreover, she performed "Case" with Mike Edwards of Big Brother Naija, Season 4.

== Accolades ==
Year	Award	Category	Result	Ref.
2019	The Headies	Best Pop Single	Won	
2019	The Headies	Song of the Year	Nominated	
2019	City People Music Awards	Popular Song of the Year	Nominated	
2019	AFRIMA	Best Female Artist in Western Africa for "Case"	Nominated	

== Snazzy the Optimist version ==
"Upgrade"

Single by Snazzy the Optimist
- Released: 2019
- Genre: Afrobeat
- Length: 3:21
- Songwriters: Michael C. Alozie; Teniola Apata
- Producer: JaySynths

Snazzy the Optimist singles chronology
"Ekele" (2018)	"Upgrade" (2019)	"Seluna" (2021)

Nigerian Singer-songwriter and rapper Snazzy the Optimist recorded and released his case version in February 2019 with a different title “Upgrade” which was produced by Nigerian record producer JaySynths. The Guardian profiled him as A Rising Star, the voice of the Nigerian younger generation and described the song as a testament to his growth and adaptability. The cover was originally released in 2019 and was redistributed in music streaming platform SoundCloud on 29 May 2020.
