= Uyo Meyo =

2018 song by Teni

Single by Teni
- Released: December 23, 2018
- Recorded: 2018
- Genre: Afro-pop
- Length: 4:02
- Label: Dr Dolor Entertainment
- Songwriter: Teniola Apata
- Producer: Michael Seyifunmi Bakare

Teni singles chronology
| "Christmas Is Here" (2018) | "Uyo Meyo" (2018) | "Party Next Door" (2019) |

Music video
- "Uyo Meyo" on YouTube

"Uyo Meyo" is a song by Nigerian singer Teni. Produced by Michael Seyifunmi Bakare, it was officially released on 23 December 2018. The song won Best Recording of the Year at The Headies 2019.

== Background ==
In July 2018, Teni graduated from American InterContinental University, completing her bachelor's program in 7 years. She shared a video on Instagram singing "Uyo Meyo" in an Ondo dialect while wearing her graduation cap. Five months later, she released the song to coincide with her 25th birthday. She said "Uyo Meyo" was inspired by the seven years it took her to complete her undergraduate degree. She also revealed the song came about while she was freestyling in her car.

== Composition ==
"Uyo Meyo" is an Afro-pop-inspired track recorded with an Ondo dialect in Yoruba and English. Produced by Michael Seyifunmi Bakare, the song's instrumental is similar to some of Ebenezer Obey's music. Its production is composed of talking drums, groovy baseline, woodwind instruments, shekere and electric guitar harmonies. In "Uyo Meyo", Teni recounts some of her struggles and pains and encourages listeners to strive to be better and work hard to reach their goals. Towards the end of the song, she vows to surpass her late father's achievements. The website Naijaloaded described "Uyo Meyo" as a "thoughtful song that speaks of joy and hope".

== Music video ==
An accompanying music video for "Uyo Meyo" was released on 4 January 2019. Directed by DK, it was chopped up with grainy footage from a selfie camera. The video captures Teni's love for singing and performing, and is a palette of her favorite and funny moments. It also includes scenes from her stage performances in Lagos and Abuja.

== Critical response ==
"Uyo Meyo" received positive reviews from music critics and consumers. Akham Papa of Naijaloaded called it "an evergreen song whose time frame will stand the test of time". An editor for SoundStroke gave "Uyo Meyo" an 8.1/10 rating, commending Teni's songwriting and saying the song's lyrics "strikes a very deep and relatable chord in most people." In a review for The New Yorker, Carrie Battan called it "an acoustic art-pop version of "We Are the World". Battan also wrote that "in an era where star power relies not just on talent but on relatability, Teni's potential isn't bound by anything, least of all geography.”

== Accolades ==
| Year | Award | Category | Recipient | Result |
|---|---|---|---|---|
| 2019 | The Headies | Best Vocal Performance (Female) | "Uyo Meyo" | Won |
| 2019 | The Headies | Best R&B Single | "Uyo Meyo" | Nominated |
| 2019 | The Headies | Best Recording of the Year | "Uyo Meyo" | Won |
