= Director Pink =

Nigerian cinematographer (born 1999)

- Born: Praise Onyeagwalam; November 28, 1999 (age 26); Lagos
- Education: University of Lagos

Praise Onyeagwalam known professionally as Director Pink, is a Nigerian film director, creative executive and educator. She rose to fame after directing the music video "Running To You" by Chike ft Simi and "Abracadabra”. She is the chief executive officer of Pinkline Films and also the founder of Pinkline Academy, a filmmaking training program.

== Early life and education ==
Onyeagwalam was born in Lagos State, Nigeria. She spent most of her childhood in Lagos, where she also acquired her secondary education. In 2020, acquired her Bachelor's Degree in Economics from the University of Lagos. She is also a graduate of the London Film Academy.

== Career ==
Onyeagwalam began making work in visual media as a teenager. However, she officially entered the film and music-video industry in 2020.

She rose to prominence after directing the cinematic video "Running To You" by Chike featuring Simi which ranked as the most viewed music video in the first half of 2021. In November 2021, she produced a short horror film titled "Lady Koikoi" which was based on Nigerian highschool folktale "Madam Koikoi". She has worked with artists across diverse genres including Wizkid, Lil Kesh, Mercy Chinwo among others.

=== Pinkline Films and Pinkline Academy ===
She founded Pinkline Films, a Lagos-based production company that produces music videos, branded content, and short films.

Onyeagwalam also founded Pinkline Academy, a filmmaking training programme developed to train emerging African creatives, foster women-led creative projects and provide practical production skills, mentorship, and industry access.

== Videography ==
Year	Song title	Artiste
2025	10 Kilo	Davido
2025	Mbali	Yemi Alade
2025	Summerdina	Chief Priest, Boypee and Zoro
2025	Friday Night	Nasboi
2025	When You Say A Thing	Mercy Chinwo
2025	Odeshi	Timaya
2025	You Are	Yemi Alade
2025	Survivor	Olivetheboy x Qing Madi
2025	Saroje	Dera
2024	Egwu	Chike ft Mohbad
2023	Confidence	Mercy Chinwo
2023	Spell	Chike ft Oxlade
2023	Bienvenue	DJ Neptune ft Ruger
2023	No More Condition	Rexxie ft Zinoleesky
2023	Asiko	Rexxie ft Lojay
2023	Abracadabra	Wizkid, Skiibii, Naira Marley & Rexxie
2023	Ole	Qing Madi ft BNXN (Fka Buju)
2023	Ego Oyibo	Chike
2023	Ovami	Oxlade ft Flavour
2023	Stranger	Simi
2023	Feeling Funny	Lil Kesh ft Young John
2023	All Eyes On Me	Niniola
2023	Single Again	Harmonize ft Ruger
2023	Attention	Soundz
2022	Breakfast	Ugoccie ft Phyno
2022	Hard To Find	Chike ft Flavour
2022	Peace	Brown Joel
2022	Nwoke Oma	Chike
2022	Grinding	DJ Neptune ft S1mba
2022	Already Won	Dunnie ft Chike
2022	Nack	The Therapist
2022	WYD	Killertunes
2022	Hosanna	Masterkraft ft Chike
2022	Follow You	Fiokee ft Gyakie & Chike
2022	Chi Efo	J'dess ft Cavemen, Waje, Chigul, Selebobo, Zoro & Loud Choir
2022	Medusa	Layzee Ella ft Khaid
2022	Bad Intentions	TAR1Q
2021	Dangerous	Cheque ft Ayra Starr
2021	My Only Baby	Ric Hassani
2021	For You	Chidinma Ekile
2021	Balance	B2C Uganda
2020	You No Love Me	Chike ft Mayorkun
2020	Running To You	Chike ft Simi
	Philomena	Marxii
	Roju	Chike

=== Films ===
Year	Title	Role	Notes
2021	Lady Koi Koi	Producer	Short film

== Awards and nominations ==
Year	Award	Category	Work	Result	Ref
2025	The Headies	Music Video of the Year "Egwu" – Director Pink	Herself	Won	
2024	TurnTable Music Awards	Outstanding Achievement in Direction for a Music Video	Herself	Won	
2023	The Headies	Best Music Video	Spell	Nominated	
2023	AFRIMMA	Best Video Director	__	Won	
2022	The Headies	Best Music Video	Roju	Nominated	
2022	AFRIMMA	Best Music Video	Nwoke Oma	Nominated	
2022	Galaxy Music Awards	Video Director of the Year	__	Nominated	

== See also ==
- List of Nigerian cinematographers
