= Wetin We Gain =

Single by Victor AD
- Released: June 17, 2018
- Recorded: June 2018
- Genre: Afrobeats
- Length: 3:35
- Label: ETIN Records
- Songwriter: Victor AD

Victor AD singles chronology
"No Idea" (2017)	"Wetin We Gain" (2018)	"Tire You" (2019)

Music video
- "Wetin We Gain" on YouTube

"Wetin We Gain" is a song by Nigerian singer and songwriter Victor AD. It was released by ETIN Records on June 17, 2018. The song peaked at number 3 on Africa Charts' list of the "Surprise Nigerian Hit Songs of 2018". The accompanying music video for "Wetin We Gain" has garnered over 12 million views on YouTube.

== Composition ==
"Wetin We Gain" focuses on themes of materialism and material success. Victor AD described the song as a "hustler's anthem" and said it is based on his personal experiences; he also characterized it as a conversation between God and himself. According to the sheet music published at yallemedia.com, "Wetin We Gain" is written in the key of G#major with a tempo of 64 beats per minute. The song follows a chord progression of G# - C# -D#.

== Music video ==
The official music video for "Wetin We Gain" was uploaded to YouTube on July 27, 2018; it was directed by Adindu Collins. An alternative video, featuring a live performance of the song, was released to YouTube on January 19, 2019.

== Reception ==
"Wetin We Gain" received positive reviews from music critics. Joey Akan of The Guardian called it an "aspirational song" and said it represents "the Nigerian dream". Pulse Nigeria's Ehis Ohunyon commended Victor AD for "narrating the daily fears of the average Nigerian" and praised the song for "weaving its way into cultural sentiments without passing any judgement".

=== Accolades ===
Year	Awards ceremony	Award description(s)	Results	Ref
2018	Soundcity MVP Awards Festival	Listener's choice	Nominated	
2018	South South Music Awards (SSMA)	Best Pop single; Best new act	Won	
2019	The Headies	Song of the Year; Best Pop Single	Nominated	

== Track listing ==
CD single and digital download

1. "Wetin We Gain" – 3:35

Other versions

- Rap version – 3:53
- Official extended live session – 5:15
