= Oga Boss =

Studio album by Illbliss
- Released: 30 November 2012
- Genres: Afrobeats; hip hop; Igbo rap
- Length: 48:49
- Languages: English; Nigerian Pidgin; Igbo
- Labels: The Goretti Company; Capital Hill Music
- Producers: Tha Suspect; Phyno; Legendury Beatz; XYZ; Silvastone; Wizboyy; Wazzbeat; Del B

Illbliss chronology
Dat Ibo Boy (2009)	Oga Boss (2012)	Powerful (2015)

Singles from Oga Boss
- 1. "Anamachi Kwanu" Released: 17 October 2011; 2. "I'm Going In" Released: 16 November 2011; 3. "Illyminate" Released: 30 December 2011; 4. "Emi Ni Baller" Released: 14 September 2012; 5. "2 Hands" Released: 25 October 2012; 6. "My Heart Beats (remix)" Released: 8 November 2012

Oga Boss is the second studio album by Nigerian rapper Illbliss. It was released on 30 November 2012, by Capital Hill Music. The album features guest appearances from Chidinma, Tha Suspect, Ice Prince, Phyno, Del B, Timaya, Banky W., Silvastone, Naeto C, Wizboyy, Stormrex and R Cube. The album's production was handled by Tha Suspect, Phyno, Legendury Beatz, XYZ, Silvastone, Wizboyy, Wazzbeat, and Del B. Oga Boss was supported by the singles, "Illyminate", "Emi Ni Baller", "Anamachi Kwanu", "My Heart Beats", and "Naalu Ekene". The album was primarily recorded in English, Pidgin English, and Igbo.

== Singles ==
The lead single "Anamachi Kwanu" features vocals and production from Phyno. "Anamachi Kwanu" was released on 17 October 2011 and was nominated for Best Rap Single at The Headies 2013. The album's second single "I'm Going In" was released on 16 November 2011. It was produced by Wazzbeat. The third single, "Illyminate", features vocals from Tha Suspect and was produced by Tha Suspect. "Illyminate" was released on 31 December 2011. The fourth single "Emi Ni Baller" features Chidinma and Tha Suspect and was produced by Legendury Beatz. The song was released on 14 September 2012. "Emi Ni Baller" was nominated for Best Collaboration at The Headies 2013. The fifth single "2 Hands" was released on 25 October 2012. It features R Cube. The sixth and final single is a remix of one of Illbliss's earlier singles, "My Heart Beats". The remix features Banky W. and Silvastone and was produced by Silvastone.

== Critical reception ==
Ayomide Tayo of Nigerian Entertainment Today rated the album a 4/5, stating that "Illbliss doesn’t make an attempt to please everyone. He is comfortable where he is at in the game. His sophomore album is a testament of hard work, ambition, determination and success. With a confident and solid second album, Illbliss reigns as the boss of all bosses." Ogaga Sakpaide of tooXclusive, who rated it a 3.5/5, felt that Oga Boss showcased Illbliss reclaiming his spot in Nigerian hip-hop with a strong lineup of guest artists and producers, even if it leaned a little too heavily on collaborations. He praised standout tracks like “Anamachi Kwanu", “Illyminate", and “Naalu Ekene", noting their energy and emotional resonance, while also highlighting the chemistry Illbliss shared with artists like Chidinma and Banky W. Donboye concluded that the album “packs the punch placing the ‘Ruler’ in the forefront once again.” In a retrospective review, Adeayo Adebiyi of Pulse Nigeria said he enjoyed the album, describing it as "sensational body of work that thematically brands Illbliss as the Big boss of Nigerian Hip Hop".

=== Accolades ===
Awards and nominations for Oga Boss
Organization	Year	Category	Result	Ref.
The Headies 2013	2013	Best Rap Album	Nominated	

== Track listing ==
Oga Boss track listing
No.	Title	Writer(s)	Producer(s)	Length
1.	"Intro"	Tobechukwu Ejiofor	—	0:20
2.	"Illyminate" (featuring Tha Suspect)	Ejiofor; David Peter	Tha Suspect	3:00
3.	"Anamachi Kwanu" (featuring Phyno)	Ejiofor; Chibuzor Azubuike	Phyno	3:25
4.	"My Heart Beats" (featuring Banky W. and Silvastone)	Ejiofor; Olubankole Wellington; D. Lynch-Shyllon	Silvastone	4:21
5.	"Graduate" (featuring Wizboyy)	Ejiofor; Isioma Ofuasia	Wizboyy	3:51
6.	"Currency Boyz 2" (featuring Ice Prince)	Ejiofor; Panshak Zamani	Tha Suspect	2:56
7.	"I Am Sorry" (featuring Chidinma)	Ejiofor; Chidinma Ekile	Legendury Beatz	2:10
8.	"Gidigba" (featuring Del B)	Ejiofor; Ayodele Basil	Del B	3:56
9.	"Naalu Ekene" (featuring Stormrex)	Ejiofor; Yvonne Akuabata Ogbuogu	Phyno	3:22
10.	"Double Double" (featuring Timaya)	Ejiofor; Inetimi Odon	Phyno	4:53
11.	"Asiko" (featuring Tha Suspect)	Ejiofor; Peter	XYZ	3:40
12.	"Emi Ni Baller" (with Tha Suspect and Chidinma)	Ejiofor; Pefer; Ekile	Legendury Beatz	3:12
13.	"I'm Going In"	Ejiofor	Wazzbeat	2:41
14.	"Hustler's Footsteps" (featuring Naeto C and Phyno)	Ejiofor; Naetochukwu Chikwe; Azubuike	Phyno	3:14
15.	"2 Hands"	Ejiofor	XYZ	3:40
Total length:				48:49

== Personnel ==
- Illbliss – primary artist
- Phyno – featured artist
- Tha Suspect – featured artist
- Chidinma – featured artist
- Naeto C – featured artist
- Wizboyy – featured artist
- Timaya – featured artist
- Silvastone – featured artist
- Ice Prince – featured artist
- Banky W. – featured artist
- Stormrex – featured artist
- Del B – featured artist
- Del B – featured artist
- Phyno – producer
- Wizboyy – producer
- Tha Suspect – producer
- XYZ – producer
- Silvastone – producer
- Legendury Beatz – producer
- Wazzbeat – producer
- Tha Suspect – mastering engineer
- Clarence Peters – video director

== Release history ==
Release history and formats for Oga Boss
Region	Date	Format	Label
Nigeria	30 November 2012	CD; digital download	Capital Hill Music; The Goretti Company
