= List of Nigerian cinematographers =

This is a list of notable Nigerian cinematographers. Nigeria's film industry is known as Nollywood.

== List ==
- Ola Cardoso
- Yinka Edward
- Niyi Akinmolayan
- Kunle Afolayan
- Director Pink
- Director K
- Adekunle Adejuyigbe
- Toka McBaror
- Anny Robert
- Emamode Edosio
- Clarence Peters
- TG Omori
- Omoni Oboli
- Unlimited L.A
