= Snazzy the Optimist =

Nigerian musician

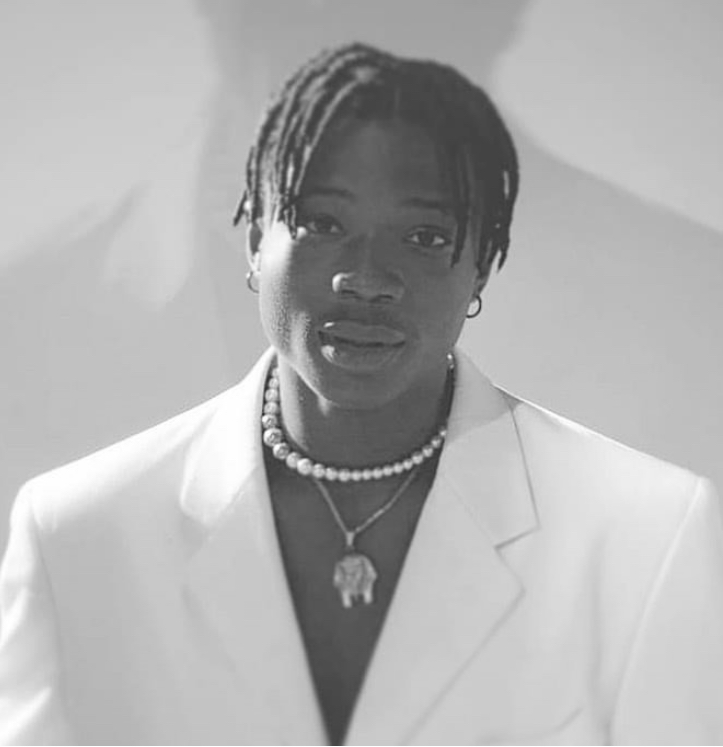

Background information
- Also known as: Snazzy
- Born: Michael Chimeruche Alozie; 28 March; Imo State, Nigeria
- Education: International College of Creative Arts
- Genres: Afropop; groove; afrobeats; hip hop
- Occupations: Singer; songwriter; rapper
- Instrument: Vocals
- Years active: 2021-present

Michael Chimeruche Alozie (born 28 March), known professionally as Snazzy the Optimist or simply Snazzy, is a Nigerian-born singer, songwriter and rapper. An alumnus of International College of Creative Arts, he began as a rapper covering songs, before starting his music career.

== Early life and education ==
Alozie was born in Imo State, a state in the south eastern region of Nigeria. According to him, his mother's dream for him was to study Medicine and has described his father as his biggest musical influence. He graduated from high school in 2018, prior graduation he moved to Lagos State the following year.

== Career ==
Growing up, Alozie began rapping as a young boy at home and in school where he often battle rapped with his friends and often participated in school competitions, he initially began as a rapper before singing. In late 2017; he officially started covering tracks. He covered tracks by diverse artists and also recorded on beats he downloaded from YouTube. One of the established tracks he covered is Teni's 2018 award-winning single "Case".

In 2021, two years after moving to Lagos State, he began his career with “Seluna”. He received mainstream attention the same year following the release of "Seluna" as part of his Mars extended play in 2021 which is yet to be released. "Seluna" debuted on ITunes Chart, and peaked at number #35. It also received support and gained airplay on radio stations including Cool FM both in Lagos and Abuja, Beat FM and the Nigerian Info.

The following year, GBA Africa in Ghana profiled him as an artiste set to make a name in the country's music industry. In January 2023, he was listed by P.M. News as one of the "musicians to look out for". The following month of that same year, he was shortlisted by Audiomack as one of the most streamed artists for Nigeria of that week alongside Asake, 1ucid and Kizz Daniel.

In February 2024, Alozie released "Asa", gaining traction on social media and achieving airplay, produced by platinum record producer Eternal Africa. A fusion of the Igbo people's Ọjà and Amapiano which is in English, Igbo and Zulu languages and features non lexical vocables. Ifeanyi Ibeh, writing for The Guardian, describes the song as original, unique, nostalgic, fresh and a tone that is up for future musical samples.
