= Ugoccie =

Nigerian singer

- Born: Favour Ugochi Anosike; 6 March 1997 (age 29); Aba, Abia
- Origin: Abia, Nigeria
- Genres: Afrobeats; alté; R&B
- Occupations: Singer; songwriter; Rapper

Favour Ugochi Anosike // (born 6 March 1997) popularly known as Ugoccie, is a Nigerian singer, songwriter, rapper and voice over artiste. She is known for her hit single "Do You Really Like Me?" The song went viral on TikTok, which earned her the Rookie of the year nomination at The Headies 2022.

== Early life ==
Favour Ugochi Anosike was born on March 6, 1997. She hails from Abia State, in the southeastern part of Nigeria and of Igbo tribe to be precise. She was raised alongside her siblings by her parents, she started singing from an early age, and finally entered the music scene in her teens as an on-air-personality.

== Career ==
She went viral on social media after she ‘cover’ ‘One ticket’ song by Kizz Daniel who shared her freestyle on his platform alongside Tunde Ednut.

In 2021, she won the next rated at naijattrafic Awards.

In March 2022, she was nominated for Rookie Of The Year at The Headies 2022.

On April 22, 2022, she collaborated with a Nigerian rapper, singer, songwriter and record producer Phyno on her song titled Breakfast.

On June 22, 2022, she was nominated at the NET Honours Class of 2022 awards.

In March 2024, she dropped the Voice of the East EP. Talking about the EP in an interview with Ukpeme Udoh of African Folder, she said the project is meant to give hope to young girl creatives from the southeastern part of Nigeria.

== Discography ==
=== EPs ===
- A Piece Of Me (2022)
- Voice of the East (2024)

=== Singles ===
- Do You Really Like Me (feat. Kolaboy) (2021)
- No Wahala (2021)
- Obi Cubana (2021)
- Due Time (2021)
- Breakfast (feat. Phyno) (2022)
- Hookup (2022)
- Close For The Day (2022)
- Loud (feat. Niniola) (2022)
- Ifenkili (2023)
- Sunny (2023)
- Man On Fire (2023)
- I Go Love (2024)
- Show You (2024)
- Ogologo (feat. Yemi Alade) (2024)
- Ifemnacho (What I Want) (feat. OgenecooNwamba) (2024)
- Achalugo (2025)
- Ihunanyam (2026)

=== As featured artist ===
- Wayo (Zamorra feat. Ugoccie) (2021)
- Mamiwater (Double Dvibes feat. Ugoccie & MPA NKU) (2022)
- Olileanya (Vizzy_danclassic feat. Ugoccie) (2022)
- Mmiri (Joanny feat. Ugoccie) (2023)
- Pray For Me (God is Never Late feat. Ugoccie) (2023)
- I Miss You (Star Baba Jay feat. Ugoccie) (2024)
- Popular (Zamorra feat. Ugoccie) (2024)
- Only You (P.Bella feat. Ugoccie) (2024)

== Awards and nominations ==
Year	Event	Prize	Recipient	Result	Ref(s)
2021	Naijatraffic awards	Next rated	“Ugoccie”	Won	
2021	Top Naija Music Awards	Artiste of the Year	Herself	Won	
2022	NET Honours Class of 2022	Breakout Artiste of the Year (Female)	"Ugoccie"	Nominated	
2022	The Headies	Rookie of the Year	Herself	Nominated	
2022	GMA	Best rap single	Herself	Won	
2023	CAEF awards	Hit song of the year	“Ugoccie”	Won	
2023	CAEF awards	Ae- FUNAI diaspora artist of the year	“Ugoccie”	Won	
2023	Gorgeous International celebrities	Influential artist of the year	Herself	Won	
