= Something to Live For (Phyno album) =

Studio album by Phyno
- Released: 12 November 2021
- Recorded: 2021
- Genres: Igbo rap; afrobeats; Igbo highlife
- Length: 55:00
- Label: Penthauze Music
- Producers: Chillz; TYMG; Runcheck; Rexxie; Ransome Beatz; Eli De Great; Marvie; Soularge; Flengy; Masterkraft

Phyno chronology
Deal with It (2019)	Something to Live For (2021)	Full Time Job (2024)

Singles from Something to Live For
- 1. "Bia" Released: 9 July 2021; 2. "Stacks" Released: 9 October 2021; 3. "Do You Wrong" Released: 8 November 2021

Something to Live For is the fourth studio album by Nigerian rapper Phyno. It was released on 12 November 2021. The 16-track album has a running time of fifty-five minutes and it features Flavour, the Cavemen, Olamide, D Smoke, Peruzzi, Jay Teazer, J Dess, Bee Pee, Pappy Kojo, and Anjulie. The production was handled by Chillz, Rexxie, Masterkraft, Ransombeatz, Blaq Jerzee, TYMG, Eli, Runcheck, Marvie, Soularge, and Flengy. Swaps, STG, MixMonster, Extraordinaire and Jaysynths did the mixing and mastering.

== Singles ==
On 9 July 2021, Phyno released "Bia" alongside its video as the lead single off the album. The song was produced by Masterkraft while the video was directed by Patrick Elis. "Stacks" was released as the album's second single on 9 October 2021. It was produced by Eli De Great. The Olamide-assisted third single "Do You Wrong" was released on 8 November 2021. It was produced by Runcheck and was the final single to be released before the album's release.

== Reception ==
Professional ratings
Review scores
Source	Rating
Pulse Nigeria	6.1/10
The Native	7/10
Naijaloaded	7/10

Motolani Alake of Pulse Nigeria described the album as Phyno's exercise in grown topics around gratitude, his journey, love, loss, braggadocio and more. Also noting that the album is too long at 16 tracks and 55 minutes, and that "Paracetamol", "Love Me Right" and "Bia" were not needed. The album was rated 6.1/10 at the end. Emmanuel Esomnofu of The Native praised Something to Live For as a reflective, genre-blending album that captures both his streetwise origins and artistic maturity, reaffirming his legacy even if it occasionally lags. As Esomnofu concluded, “The legacy I’m leaving behind has a whole lot to do with realness.” Rating: 7/10. Joy Dennis of Naijaloaded rated the album 7/10, adding that the album is something the industry has missed and "It's a breath of fresh air".

== Track listing ==
Something to Live For track listing
No.	Title	Writer(s)	Producer(s)	Length
1.	"Chizoba" (featuring The Cavemen.)	Chibuzor Azubuike; Kingsley Okorie; Benjamin James	Chillz	4:06
2.	"Stacks"	Azubuike	EliDeGreat	2:58
3.	"Belong to You" (featuring Peruzzi)	Azubuike; Tobechukwu Okoh	TYMG	3:07
4.	"Ghetto"	Azubuike	Runcheck	2:37
5.	"I Do This" (featuring D Smoke)	Azubuike; Daniel Farris	TYMG	3:54
6.	"Do You Wrong" (featuring Olamide)	Azubuike; Olamide Adedeji	Runcheck	3:27
7.	"Winner"	Azubuike	Chillz	5:29
8.	"All the Smoke"	Azubuike	Rexxie	3:13
9.	"Onye Nwa"	Azubuike	Chillz	3:07
10.	"No Love" (featuring Jay Teazer)	Azubuike; John Chia	Ransom Beatz; Marvie	2:32
11.	"Paracetamol"	Azubuike	Blaq Jerzee	3:19
12.	"Ikepentecost" (featuring Flavour)	Azubuike; Chinedu Okoli	Masterkraft	3:21
13.	"Love Me Right" (featuring J'Dess)	Azubuike; Joy Ebiem	Soularge	3:54
14.	"Gold Medal" (featuring Pappy Kojo and Bee Pee)	Azubuike; Jason Gaisie; Munu Paul	Flengy	3:50
15.	"Ain't Nobody" (featuring Anjulie)	Azubuike; Anjulie Persaud	Eli De Great	2:59
16.	"Bia"	Azubuike	Masterkraft	3:39
Total length:				55:00
