= Nothing to Prove (EP) =

EP by Victor AD
- Released: July 30, 2021
- Genre: Afrobeats
- Length: 17:00
- Language: English; Pidgin
- Label: RED EYE
- Producer: Victor Adere

Victor AD chronology
Red Eye (2019)	Nothing to Prove (2021)

Nothing to Prove is an EP by Nigerian singer and songwriter Victor AD. It was released on July 30, 2021, through RED EYE.

== Background ==
The 6-track EP has a running time of 17 minutes and features Mr Eazy on "Black", Phyno on "Anymore", and Lava Lava on "Joanna".

The sound production was done by Kulboy(tracks 1,2,4 and 5) and Vibo(tracks 3 and 6)

== Reception ==
Pulse Ng rated the EP 8.0/10, stating that it is a beautiful EP with high replay value.

Waploaded reviewed the EP and gave it a rating of 4/5.

== Track listing ==
No.	Title	Length
1.	"Black" (featuring Mr Eazy)	2:58
2.	"Anymore" (featuring Phyno)	3:04
3.	"Bless Boys"	2:25
4.	"Olofofo"	3:04
5.	"One Kiss"	3:09
6.	"Joanna" (featuring Lava Lava)	3:08
Total length:		17:00
