= Mr Real =

Nigerian musician

- Also known as: Realself
- Born: Okafor Uchenna Victor; Lagos State, Nigeria
- Genres: Afropop; Street pop; hip hop
- Occupations: Rapper; singer; songwriter
- Instrument: Vocals
- Years active: 2012–present
- Label: SME Africa

Okafor Uchenna Victor, popularly known as Mr Real, is a Nigerian rapper and singer from Lagos State.

== Early life ==
Okafor Uchenna Victor was born in Lagos State, Nigeria. He gained prominence after releasing the street anthem "Legbegbe". He signed a recording deal with Sony Music Entertainment Africa in 2018.

== Discography ==
=== Singles ===
| Year | Song | Featured |
|---|---|---|
| 2017 | Legbebe | Idowest, Oba Dice, Kelvin Chuks |
| 2018 | Overload | Mr Eazi & Slimcase |
| 2018 | Allow Me | Solidstar |
| 2020 | Baba fela | |
| 2022 | Ina Omo | |
| 2026 | Put In the Work | |

=== Featured ===
| Year | Song | Artist | Featured |
|---|---|---|---|
| 2017 | Issa Banger | D'banj | Slimcase |
| 2018 | Balu | CDQ | Idowest |
| 2018 | Normal Level | DJ Nana | Zoro |
| 2018 | Sisi | DJ Neptune | Small Doctor & Pasuma |
| 2018 | Masun | Jaywon | Idowest & Ichaba |
| 2018 | Upandan | Zoroswagbag | |
| 2018 | Kunta Kunte | DJ Lambo | |

== Selected awards and nominations ==
| Year | Award ceremony | Award description | Result | Ref |
|---|---|---|---|---|
| 2018 | The Headies | Best Street-Hop Artiste | Nominated | |
| Year | Award ceremony | Award description | Result | Ref |
| 2018 | Nigeria Entertainment Awards | Hottest Single of the year | Won | |

== See also ==
- List of Nigerian musicians
