= Illbliss =

Nigerian rapper

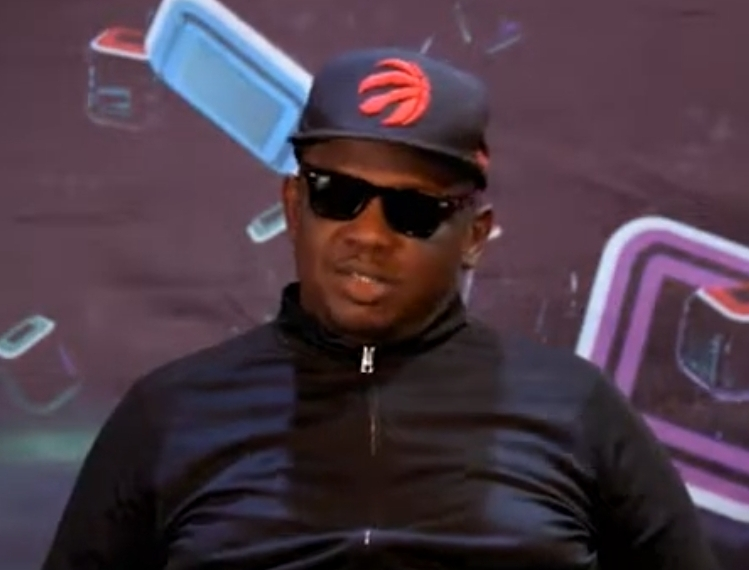

Background information
- Also known as: Oga Boss
- Born: Tobechukwu Melvin Ejiofor
- Origin: Nkwerre, Imo State, Nigeria
- Genres: Hip hop
- Occupations: Rapper, Record Executive, TV Content Producer, Businessman and Actor
- Years active: 2000–present
- Label: CAPital Hill Music/The Goretti Company

Tobechukwu Melvin Ejiofor, professionally known as Illbliss (stylized as iLLBLISS), is a Nigerian rapper, actor, and businessman. He is the owner of the talent managing outfit known as 'The Goretti Company', company responsible for launching the careers of Chidinma and Phyno, among others. He is regarded as one of the most influential Nigerian Rappers helping to pioneer the 'Eastern - Igbo Boy Movement' in Nigerian hip hop.

Also popularly known as Oga Boss, he has received many nominations and won awards, the most notable being the award for Best Hiphop Video (for the hit "U Go Wound O!!") at the 2008 maiden edition of the Soundcity Music Video Awards. This award was presented to him by the American hip-hop star Nas.In 2019, he made a debut in acting by starring in the movie
King of Boys as Odogwu. His debut album, Dat Ibo Boy, which dropped in 2009, contained, "Aiye Po Gan! (Enuf Space)". He then released a new album July 2020, Illy Chapo X. His album Illy Chapo X was also nominated for the category of best rap album for the Headies 2020 award. Considering the situation of the country back in 2019, the indigenous rapper said President Buhari is silent many issues surrounding the country. He said "Mr. Buhari, are you still ruling us? You are mute on a lot of issues, I really don't get you". He further added "We all feel like a ship with no captain, no direction. This is a powerful country you have been installed to rule. Can you really just rule and show any level of empathy? Can you sir".

== Acting career ==
Illbliss ventured into acting in 2018, appearing in the critically acclaimed Nigerian film King of Boys, directed by Kemi Adetiba. He played the role of Odogwu Malay, a character that endeared him to Nollywood fans. The movie’s success led to a sequel, King of Boys: The Return of the King, which became Nigeria’s first Netflix Original Series, where Illbliss reprised his role in 2021.

== Recent projects and brand partnerships ==
In 2020, Illbliss released iLLY Chapo X, which was met with critical acclaim. He won another Lyricist on the Roll award at The Headies in 2021 for his politically charged single "Country". Afterward, he took a hiatus from music to focus on other ventures, including television production.

Between 2019 and 2023, Illbliss entered a five-year brand partnership with Hero Lager Beer by International Breweries Plc, which involved his executive production of an album titled Worthy, released in 2023. The project aimed to support rising talents in the South East and South-South regions of Nigeria and featured a blend of Afrobeats and highlife.

In 2024, Illbliss returned with his seventh studio album, Sideh Kai. The album featured collaborations with several prominent Nigerian artists, including OdumoduBlvck, Vector, Teni, Made Kuti, Fave, and Cobhams Asuquo, and was hailed as a contemporary Nigerian hip-hop classic.

== Television production ==
In 2024, Illbliss expanded his media portfolio by producing Freemen, a seven-part documentary series on the Igbo Apprenticeship System. The show premiered on Showmax and marked iLLBLISS’s first major foray into television production through his content company Gosibe.

== Discography ==
=== Solo albums ===
- Dat Ibo Boy (2009)
- Oga Boss (2012)
- #Powerful (2015)
- Illygaty:7057 (2016)
- Illy Bomaye (2017)
- Illosophy (2019)
- Illy Chapo X (2020)
- Sideh Kai (2024)

=== EPs ===
- Position of Power, Vol. 1 (2012)
- Position of Power, Vol. 2 (2014)

=== Collaborative albums ===
- IllyZilla (with Teck Zilla) (2019)#

== Filmography ==
Year	Film	Role				Notes	Ref
Year	Film	Actor	Director	Producer	Writer	Notes	Ref
2018	King of Boys	Yes					
2021	King of Boys: The Return of the King	Yes					
2024	Freemen (Documentary)			Yes			

== Awards and nominations ==
Year	Event	Prize	Recipient	Result	Ref
2008	Sound City Music Video Awards	The SMVA for Best Hip-Hop Video	Himself	Won	
2009	South South Music Awards	The SSMA for Most Popular Video for "Aiye Po Gan! (Enuf Space)"	Himself	Won	
2010	The Headies	Hip Hop World Revelation of the Year	Himself	Nominated	
2010	The Headies	The Headies Award for Best Rap Album	Himself	Nominated	
2010	The Headies	The Headies Award for Best Collaboration	Himself	Nominated	
2012	The NMWA	The Best Hip-Hop Video	Himself	Won	
2013	The Headies	The Headies Award for Best Rap Album	Himself	Nominated	
2014	The Headies	The Headies Award for Best Rap Single	Himself	Nominated	
2015	The Headies	The Headies Award for Lyricist on the Roll	Himself	Nominated	
2016	The Headies	The Headies Award for Lyricist on the Roll	Himself	Won	
2016	The Headies	The Headies Award for Best Rap Album	Himself	Won	
2020	The Headies	The Headies Award for Lyricist on the Roll	Himself	Won	
2020	The Headies	The Headies Award for Best Rap Album	Himself	Nominated	
2020	The Headies	The Headies Award for Best Rap Single	Himself	Nominated	
