= A-Q =

Nigerian rapper and songwriter (born 1986)

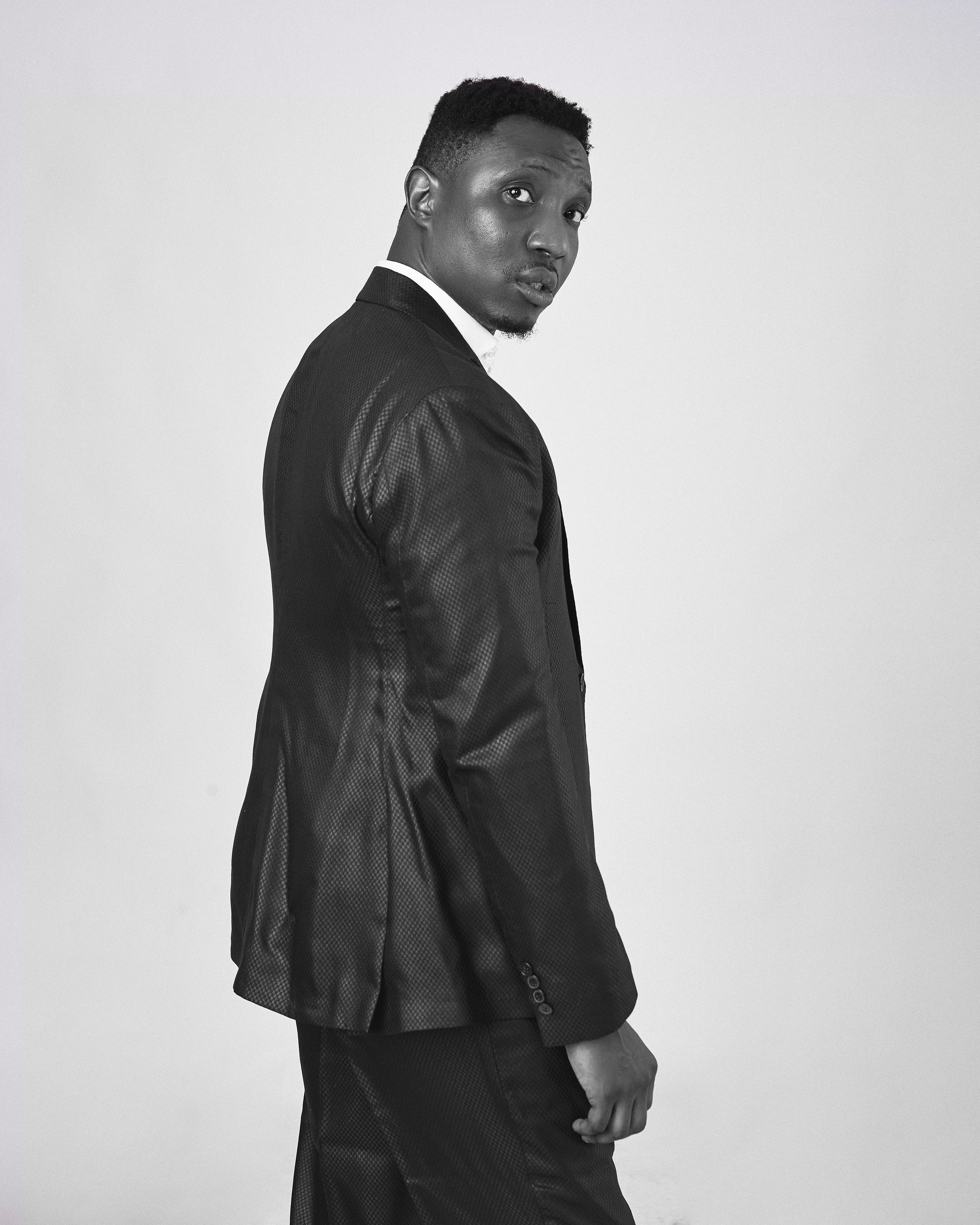
- A-Q on the set of 'ETHOS' photoshoot (2022)

Background information
- Also known as: A-Q
- Born: Gilbert Bani; 1 August 1986 (age 40); Abia State, Nigeria
- Genre: Hip-Hop
- Occupations: Rapper; songwriter; record executive; entrepreneur
- Years active: 2003–present
- Labels: The Cake Bizness, Hustle Inc, 100 Crowns
- Website: thecakebizness.com

Gilbert Bani (born 1 August 1986), known by his stage name A-Q, is a Nigerian rapper and songwriter. His single "Agu Ji Ndi Men" was nominated for Best Rap Single at The Headies 2016.

== Early life ==
Born into a family of six as the last child, A-Q, whose real name is Gilbert Bani, was raised in Surulere where he has lived for most of his life.

== Education ==
A-Q attended Kings College Lagos, and had his tertiary education at the University of Lagos. At a young age he started collecting hip-hop tracks, learning the lyrics and miming them. It didn't take long before he started writing his own lyrics.

== Music career ==
A-Q signed his first record deal in 2001 with Big Leaf Records, where he was for two years before he started working on his own in 2003. His first single "(W)rap Nigeria", produced by kraftmatics, debuted in 2004 followed by a music video. He subsequently released a full compilation album, Listen and Understand in 2005 followed by another single, "Things That We Do", which got him an international online distribution deal. In 2006 A-Q put out a mixtape titled Maga Must Pay vol 1.

A-Q took a break from music to finish his education in University of Lagos but still managed to release a single, "Make Money", and accompanying video in 2008 produced by Laylow and featuring Morachi and Xtrim off an online mixtape titled Love and Money.

A-Q graduated in 2010 and returned to the entertainment industry, this time co-floating a record label, Hustle Inc, on whose platform he started Black Friday Twitter Freestyles, a weekly free download release. This got him online acknowledgement, including from producer Don Jazzy, who styled him “one of the sickest rappers alive”. He recorded and released The Past Present and Future album in December 2010 which had the singles "Names" and "Champagne and Rum". He released more music, including "Distractions" featuring Vector in 2012, "Machine Gun Flow", "555 (5beats 5verses and 5blessings)", and "Why" featuring Pamela.

He released an EP in December 2012 titled Make Your Best Rapper Look Stupid. He is currently working on his sophomore album titled G.I.L.B.E.R.T (Grace and Glory).

In 2018, A-Q was part of LAMBAugust, a rap campaign in Nigeria, and released an album with Chocolatecity rapper Loose Kaynon called Crown.

A-Q won Lyricist on the Roll for "Crown" at the 13th edition of The Headies.

He left Chocolate city record label in 2020 and said “I had a wholesome experience at Chocolate City, and I’m happy to have been part of the label’s journey to profitability”. He went further setting up a music incubator for African artistes.

In February 2021, A-Q won the Best Rap Album award for his 2020 album "God's Engineering" at the 14 Edition of The Headies awards.

In September 2022, A-Q won the Lyricist on the Roll award for his performance on "The Last Cypher" single off the "Behold The Lamb" album at the 15th Edition of The Headies Awards in Atlanta, US.

2023 saw the release of God's Engineering 2, which was described as "excels in the quality of its lyricism and delivery...".

== Discography ==
=== Studio albums ===
- The Past Present and Future (2010)
- Son of John: History Untold (2015)
- Rose (2016)
- Blessed Forever (2017)
- Crown (with Loose Kaynon) (2018)
- God's Engineering (2020)
- Golden (2021)
- Behold The Lamb with M.I Abaga, Loose Kaynon and Blaqbonez (2022)
- ETHOS (with Brymo) (2022)
- God's Engineering 2 (2023)
- Purple Doesn't Exist (2024)
- GE3 (The Beginning) (2025)

=== Mixtapes and EPs ===
- Listen and Overstand (2005)
- Maga Must Pay Mixtape (2006)
- Love and Money (The Mixtape) (2008)
- Make Your Best Rapper Look Stupid (2012)
- Son of John: Grace & Glory (2014)
- Catch Your Sub (2016)
- The Definition (2016)
- The Live Report (with M.I Abaga) (2020)

=== Singles ===
- "(W)rap Nigeria" (2005)
- "Make Money" (2007)
- "Names" (2010)
- "Champagne and Rum" (2011)
- "Why" (2012)
- "God's Work" (2019)
- "L.A.M.B Cypher" (2019) with M.I Abaga, Loose Kaynon and Blaqbonez
- "You Must Feel Am" (2020) ft Oxlade
- "Breathe" (2021) ft Chike

== See also ==
- List of Nigerian musicians
