= Slimcase (singer) =

- Born: Oluwafemi Oladapo; 22 August 1982 (age 44); Lagos State, Nigeria
- Origin: Ikorodu, Lagos
- Genres: Afropop; hip hop; street pop
- Occupations: Rapper; singer; songwriter
- Instrument: Vocals
- Years active: 2017– present

Oluwafemi Oladapo (born in August 22, 1982) better known as Slimcase, is a Nigerian singer, songwriter, hype man, and actor. He is known for featuring on fellow Nigerian artist D'banj's single,"Issa Banger" and "Gucci Snake", by Wizkid with a new dance routine known as 'shaku shaku' and the street pop, genre.

He has collaborated with Nigerian artistes like Wizkid, Tiwa Savage, Yemi Alade, Mr Eazi, 2Baba.

== Early life ==
He was born in Ikorodu, Lagos State, Nigeria, on August 22, 1982, and grew up in Lagos with his parents. He received both his first school leaving certificate and his West African senior school certificate in Lagos, where he completed his elementary and secondary school education.

== Career ==
In 2018, he featured on commercially acclaimed Nigerian street pop single "Shepeterri" by Idowest.

In 2018, he was nominated for The Headies Best Street-Hop Artiste and Best new act at Nigeria Entertainment Awards

In 2018, he won best collaboration at the City People Entertainment Awards

== Discography ==
- Kalamo
- Furoonaire
- Hawahoo
- Lambaxtra
- Watch
- Azaman feat. 2baba, Dj Neptune & Peruzzi
- Ijoba
- Bushman
- Pongilah feat. Zlatan
- MajeOmo
- Mr Dickson
- Focus Vibe
- Otumba Lamba
- Oshozondi
- Oh Baby Ringtone

=== As featured ===
- Shepeteri
- Iworiwo Ft. 2baba Shawa Shawa Ft Dj Neptune, Olamide, CDQ
- Diet (DJ Enimoney, Reminisce & Tiwa Savage)
- Gucci Snake (Wizkid)
- Mari (Orezi)
- Naija Issa Goal (Naira Marley)
- Malowa (Omawumi)
- Merule (Mz Kiss)
- Issa banger (D’banj)
- Shawa Shawa
- Yaji (Yemi Alade)
- Overload (Mr Eazi)

== Awards and nominations ==
Year	Event	Prize	Recipient	Result	Ref
2018	The Headies	Best Street-Hop Artiste	"Himself"	Nominated	
2018	Nigeria Entertainment Awards	Best New Act	"Himself"	Nominated	
2018	City People Entertainment Awards	Best Collabo	"Himself"	Won	
2018	City People Entertainment Awards	Best Collabo	"Himself"	Nominated	
