= Teni (singer) =

Nigerian singer and songwriter (born 1993)

Teni MON
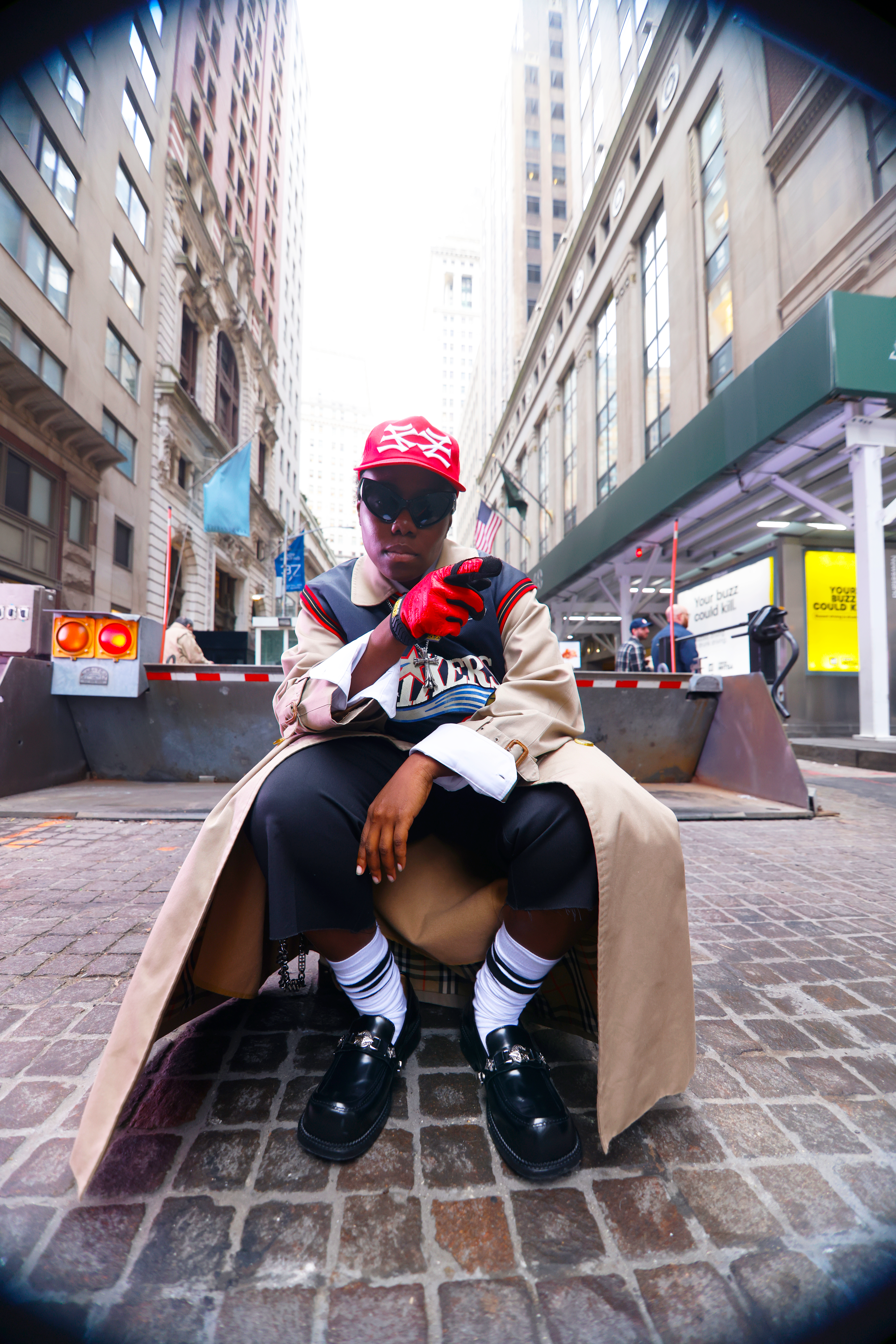
- Teni in NYC 2024

Background information
- Born: Teniola Apata; 23 December 1993 (age 32); Lagos State, Nigeria
- Genres: Afrobeats; pop

Teniola Apata MON (born 23 December 1993), known professionally as Teni or Teni the Entertainer, is a Nigerian singer and songwriter.

== Early life ==
Teni was born on 23 December 1993 in Lagos State. She is the younger sister of Nigerian singer Niniola. She attended Apata Memorial High School and later the University of Georgia, but finished at American InterContinental University where she obtained degree in business administration.

Teni before gaining mainstream success, was popularly known for doing covers of songs and freestyles on instagram.

She is also a songwriter attributed for songs for artists like Davido ("Like Dat").

== Career ==
=== 2016–2019: "Fargin", "Askamaya", and other recordings ===
Teni released her debut single "Amen" while signed to Shizzi's Magic Fingers Records. She left the record label and signed with Dr. Dolor Entertainment in 2017. Teni started gaining prominence after releasing the single "Fargin" in September 2017. She made her breakthrough after releasing the hit singles "Askamaya", "Case" which was later covered by Nigerian musician Snazzy the Optimist as "Upgrade", and "Uyo Meyo". "Askamaya" was ranked 15th on MTV Base's year-end list of the Top 20 Hottest Naija Tracks of 2018.

On 20 February 2019, Teni was featured on YouTube Music's Trending Artist on the Rise. On 3 May 2019, she released the video for "Sugar Mummy". On 14 June 2019, she released a new single titled "Power Rangers".

=== 2019–2020: Billionaire and Quarantine Playlist ===
Teni released her debut E.P, Billionaire on 11 October 2019. The "Billionaire EP" was compiled with six (6) tracks and no guest appearance. The E.P was produced by Jaysynths Beatz and Pheelz.

In April 2020, Teni partnered with Nigerian Disk Jockey, DJ Neptune to release an EP called the Quarantine Playlist, which sees her playing out different stages of being in quarantine and talking about the strains of being on lock down due to the coronavirus pandemic. The four-track EP is mostly mid-tempo and includes production from Tempoe, P. Prime and Dëra.

=== 2021–present: Wondaland ===
On 2 February 2021, Teni revealed the name and expected date for her forthcoming debut album. She shared this on her Instagram account "The time is near... And the album shall be called “WONDALAND” 🦋#MARCH2021 #WONDALAND"

Her debut album 'WONDALAND' was crafted for over two years in cities like London, New York City, Orlando, Ondo, Lagos and Abuja.

The album's production was handled by Pheelz, Damayo, Tempoe, P.Prime, Millamix, Krizbeatz, and Ozedikus and was made available for purchase and online streaming on several music platforms, including Apple Music, Amazon Music, Spotify, Deezer, and Google Play.

=== 2024–present: Global Citizen ===
In 2024, Teni signed to Artist House, an independent record label & management company based in New York City. On January 17, 2025, Teni released her new single "Money", which is her biggest single debut to date. The single reached Top 10 Spotify, Apple, YouTube, TikTok Nigeria, Top 50 Global Shazam, #1 Shazam Nigeria, Top 10 Shazam Uganda, Ghana, Kenya, Zambia, & Cameroon. Her new project Global Citizen is due out in 2025.

=== The Wellness Package ===
In 2026, Teni released The Wellness Package, a 7-track extended play centering on theme-driven affirmations, spiritual well-being, and hope. Mainly produced by DeeYasso along with contributions from Spotless and Spellz, the project spans genres including Yoruba folk, highlife, reggae harmonies, and amapiano. The EP features guest appearances from Chike on the track "Wuru Manya" and highlife duo The Cavemen on "Wise," alongside singles such as "Face Front," "Meditation," and the lead track "Zion."

== Endorsements ==
In March 2019, Teni signed an endorsement deal with Tom Tom, a candy brand produced by Cadbury Nigeria. On 6 October 2020, PM News reported that Teni had signed an endorsement deal with Telecommunications Giant, Globacom Nigeria.

== Awards and nominations ==
Teni won Rookie of the Year at the 2018 Headies Awards, and Most Promising Act to Watch at the 2018 Nigeria Entertainment Awards. She also won Best New Artist at the 2018 Soundcity MVP Awards Festival. NotJustOk ranked her eighth on its list of the 10 Hottest Artists in Nigeria. She was listed on Premium Times' list of the Six Nigerian break-out stars, viral sensations of 2018.

In October 2022, Teni was conferred a Nigerian National Award – Member of the Order of the Niger (MON) – by Nigeria's former president Muhammadu Buhari. There was a controversy on social media about her approach to receiving the award.

== Discography ==
=== Studio albums and EPs ===
- Billionaire (2019)
- The Quarantine Playlist (2020)
- WONDALAND (2021)
- Moslado Refix (featuring Emmyblaq)
- Christmas Is Here (2023)
- The Wellness Package (2026)

=== Selected singles ===
As lead artist
Year	Title	Album
2016	"Amen"	Non-album single
2017	"Fargin"	Non-album single
2018	"Wait"	Non-album single
2018	"Pareke"	Non-album single
2018	"Lagos"	Non-album single
2018	"Askamaya"	Non-album single
2018	"Fake Jersey"	Non-album single
2018	"Shake Am"	Non-album single
2018	"Case"	Non-album single
2018	"Pray"	Non-album single
2018	"Uyo Meyo"	Non-album single
2019	"Party Next Door"	TBA
2019	"Sugar Mummy"	TBA
2019	"Power Rangers"	TBA
2020	"Marry"	Non-album single
2021	"For You" ft Davido	Wondaland
2021	"Dorime"	Non-album single
2022	"One Day"	Non-album single
2022	"My Way (E GET WHY) [Freestyle]"	
2022	"LITTLE & LENGENDARY"	LITTLE & LENGENDARY
2023	"No Days Off"	Non-album single
2023	"Lanke"	Non-album single
2023	"Malaika"	Non-album single
2025	"Money"	Global Citizen
2025	"Speed" ft Gunna	TBA
As featured artist
Year	Title	Album
2018	"Rambo" (Dr. Dolor featuring Teni)	Non-album single
2018	"Pray"	Non-album single
2018	"Aye Kan" (Shizzi featuring Teni and Mayorkun)	Non-album single
2019	‘’Sound’’ (Diamond Platnumz) feat. Teni ‘’Laye Mi’’ (Codest Boi) feat. Teni	Non-album single
2020	Fuji Pop (Ojayy Wright featuring Teni)	Non-album single
Writing credits
Year	Title	Album
2017	"Like Dat" by Davido	Non-album single

== Awards ==
Year	Award ceremony	Prize	Recipient	Result	Ref
2018	The Headies	Rookie of the Year	Herself	Won	
2018	Soundcity MVP Awards Festival	Best New Artist	Herself	Won	
2018	Nigeria Entertainment Awards	Most Promising Act to Watch	Herself	Won	
2019	BET Awards	Best New International Act	Herself	Nominated	
2019	The Headies	Best Pop Single	"Case"	Won	
2019	The Headies	Song of the Year	"Case"	Nominated	
2019	The Headies	Best Recording of the Year	"Uyo Meyo"	Won	
2019	The Headies	Best R&B Single	"Uyo Meyo"	Nominated	
2019	The Headies	Viewer's Choice	Herself	Won	
2019	The Headies	Best Vocal Performance (Female)	Teni for "Uyo Meyo"	Won	
2019	MTV Europe Music Awards	Best African Act	Herself	Nominated	
2020	Soundcity MVP Awards	Best female MVP	Herself	Won	
2021	Net Honours	Most Searched Musician (female)	Herself	Won	
2021	All Africa Music Awards	All Africa Music Awards	Herself	Pending	
2022	Nigeria National Awards	Member of the Order of Niger	Herself	Awarded	

== See also ==
- List of Nigerian musicians
