= Phyno =

Nigerian rapper and singer (born 1986)

- Also known as: Ezege; Obiagu
- Born: Chibuzor Nelson Azubuike; 9 October 1986 (age 40); Enugu, Enugu State, Nigeria
- Genres: Igbo rap; hip hop
- Occupations: Rapper; singer; songwriter; record producer
- Years active: 2003–present
- Labels: Sputnet; Penthauze

Chibuzor Nelson Azubuike (born 9 October 1986), known professionally as Phyno, is a Nigerian rapper, singer, songwriter, and record producer. A native of Anambra State, Phyno was born and raised in Enugu State. He started his music career as a producer in 2003 and primarily raps in Igbo. His debut studio album, No Guts No Glory, was released in March 2014. It yielded the singles "Ghost Mode", "Man of the Year", "Parcel", and "O Set". Phyno's other albums include The Playmaker (2016), Deal With It (2019), Something to Live For (2021), Full Time Job (2024), and Let That Sink In (LTSI) (2026).

== Early life and music career ==
=== 1986–2013: Career beginnings and No Guts No Glory ===
A native of Anambra State, Chibuzor Nelson Azubuike was born and raised in Enugu State. His stage moniker came from the word phenomenal, which was given to him by one of his friends from secondary school. Phyno developed an interest in music production during his secondary school days. He initially wanted to become a pilot, but was told that he could be a doctor. He learned to play the drums and piano throughout secondary school and created his own rendition of every recording he heard. He studied public administration at the Institute of Management and Technology in Enugu, and started profiting from music during his second year there. Phyno told Ifeoma Onoye that Mr Raw was one of the few people he looked up to. He started rapping in 2010 and relocated to Lagos to further his music career.

Phyno started recording his debut studio album, No Guts No Glory, in 2012. The album featured guest appearances from Stormrex, Omawumi, Olamide, Efa, P-Square, Timaya, Flavour N'abania, Mr Raw, M.I, Ice Prince and Runtown. It was primarily recorded in Igbo and Nigerian Pidgin. The Olamide-assisted track "Ghost Mode" was released on 25 September 2012, as the album's lead single. The song won Best Collabo at both The Headies 2012 and 2013 Nigeria Entertainment Awards. On 7 December 2012, Phyno released the music video for "Ghost Mode", which was filmed in Lagos by Clarence Peters. Sputnet Records released the album's second single, "Man of the Year (Obago)", on 23 March 2013. The song won Best Rap Single at the 2013 Headies Awards.

In June 2013, Phyno performed for 25 minutes in Owerri as part of the Star Music Trek tour. As a supporting act on the 2013 Hennessy Artistry Club Tour, he toured with D'banj, Burna Boy, Chidinma, Vector, Pucado, Seyi Shay, Show Dem Camp, Kay Switch and Sean Tizzle. The music video for "Man of the Year (Obago)" was uploaded to YouTube on 20 August 2013. It was also directed by Clarence Peters in Abakpa Nike and features a cameo appearance from Illbliss. In September 2013, the Nigerian Broadcasting Corporation banned the music video from being broadcast. On 11 October, Phyno released the album's third single "Parcel", which was originally titled "Parcel (a Big Nwa)".

=== 2014–present: Singles and 2Kings ===
The music video for "Parcel" was recorded by Peters and released on 19 February 2014. "O Set" was released as the album's fourth single on 4 March 2014. The song was produced by WizzyPro and features vocals by P-Square. The song's music video was directed by Jude Engees Okoye. On 22 May 2014, Phyno released the music video for "Alobam", which was directed by Clarence Peters. "Alobam" was produced by Major Bangz and is an Igbo slang for "My Guy". On 2 September 2014, Phyno released the video for his "Authe (Authentic)" song with Flavour. On 7 October 2014, he released the Major Bangz-produced track "Yayo", which debuted at number 8 on the Pulse Music Video chart. Phyno performed at the 2014 edition of the Star Music Trek tour in Nsukka. The Peters-directed music video for "Yayo" premiered on 5 January 2015. Opeoluwani Akintayo of The Daily Times of Nigeria gave the video an overall rating of 8 of 10, commending its use of props.

2 Kings, a joint album by Phyno and Olamide, was released on 1 April 2015. Both rappers announced plans for the album's release on social media. Phyno announced plans to release his third studio album, Deal With It, in March 2019. Supported by the singles "Agu" and "The Bag", the album features guest appearances from Olamide, Falz, Davido, Don Jazzy, Zoro, Runtown and Teni. In July 2021, Phyno released the single "Bia".

== Artistry ==
Phyno told the Nigerian Tribune that he raps in Igbo because he respects his culture and loves being himself. He also incorporates a bit of Nigerian Pidgin and English into his music, and believes the elements of music make it borderless.

== Discography ==
Studio albums

- No Guts No Glory (2014)
- The Playmaker (2016)
- Deal With It (2019)
- Something to Live For (2021)
- Full Time Job (2024)
- Let That Sink In (LTSI) (2026)

Collaborative albums

- 2 Kings (with Olamide) (2015)

== Filmography ==
Film
Year	Film	Role	Notes
2018	Lionheart	as Obiora	Movie

== Awards and nominations ==
Phyno awards and nominations
Awards and nominations
Award	Wins	Nominations
The Headies	3	15
Nigeria Entertainment Awards	1	3
Channel O Music Video Awards	0	1
City People Entertainment Awards	1	4
Nigeria Music Video Awards (NMVA)	0	1
African Muzik Magazine Awards	0	2
MTV Africa Music Awards	0	1
Channel O Music Video Awards	0	1

Totals (Note: Certain award groups do not simply award one winner. They acknowledge several different recipients, have runners-up, and have third place. Since this is a specific recognition and is different from losing an award, runner-up mentions are considered wins in this award tally. For simplification and to avoid errors, each award in this list has been presumed to have had a prior nomination.)
- Wins: 6
- Nominations: 28

MTV Africa Music Awards

Year	Nominee / work	Award	Result	Ref
2015	Himself	Best Hip-hop	Nominated	

Channel O Music Video Awards

Year	Nominee / work	Award	Result	Ref
2014	"Alobam"	Most Gifted Hip-hop	Nominated	

City People Entertainment Awards

Year	Nominee / work	Award	Result	Ref
2014	Himself	Rap Artiste of the Year	Won	
2014	No Guts No Glory	Rap Album of the Year	Nominated	
2013	"Ghost Mode" (featuring Olamide)	Best Collabo of the Year	Nominated	
2013	Himself	Best Rap Artiste of the Year	Nominated	

Nigeria Entertainment Awards

Year	Nominee / work	Award	Result	Ref
2014	Himself	Best Rap Act of the Year	Nominated	
2013	Himself	Best Rap Act of the Year	Nominated	
2013	"Ghost Mode" (featuring Olamide)	Best Collabo	Won	

African Muzik Magazine Awards

Year	Nominee / work	Award	Result	Ref
2013	Himself	Best Newcomer	Nominated	
2013	Himself	Best Rap Act	Nominated	

Nigeria Music Video Awards (NMVA)

Year	Nominee / work	Award	Result	Ref
2013	"Man of the Year"	Best Afro Hip Hop Video	Nominated	

The Headies

Year	Nominee / work	Award	Result	Ref
2014	Himself	Artiste of the Year	Nominated	
2014	Phyno for "Alobam"	Best Street-Hop Artiste	Nominated	
2014	No Guts No Glory	Best Rap Album	Nominated	
2014	No Guts No Glory	Album of the Year	Nominated	
2014	"Parcel"	Best Rap Single	Won	
2014	"Dope Money" (Olamide featuring Phyno)	Best Rap Single	Nominated	
2013	Himself	Next Rated	Nominated	
2013	Himself	Lyricist on the Roll	Nominated	
2013	"Ghost Mode" (featuring Olamide)	Best Collabo	Won	
2013	"Ezioku" (Lynxxx featuring Ikechukwu, Illbliss, and Phyno)	Best Collabo	Nominated	
2013	"Man of the Year"	Best Rap Single	Won	
2013	"Anam Achi Kwanu" (Illbliss featuring Phyno)	Best Rap Single	Nominated	
2013	"Ghost Mode" (featuring Olamide)	Best Rap Single	Nominated	
2012	"Shutdown"	Best Rap Single	Nominated	
2012	Phyno (for "Shutdown")	Lyricist on the Roll	Nominated	

NET Honours

Year	Nominee/work	Award	Result	Ref
2021	Himself	Most Searched Musician (male)	Nominated	
2021	"HighWay" (DJ Kaywise featuring Phyno)	Most played alternative song	Nominated	

TurnTable Music Awards

Year	Nominee/work	Award	Result	Ref
2024	Himself	Comeback of the Year	Won	

== See also ==
- List of Nigerian rappers
- List of Nigerian musicians
