= Victor AD =

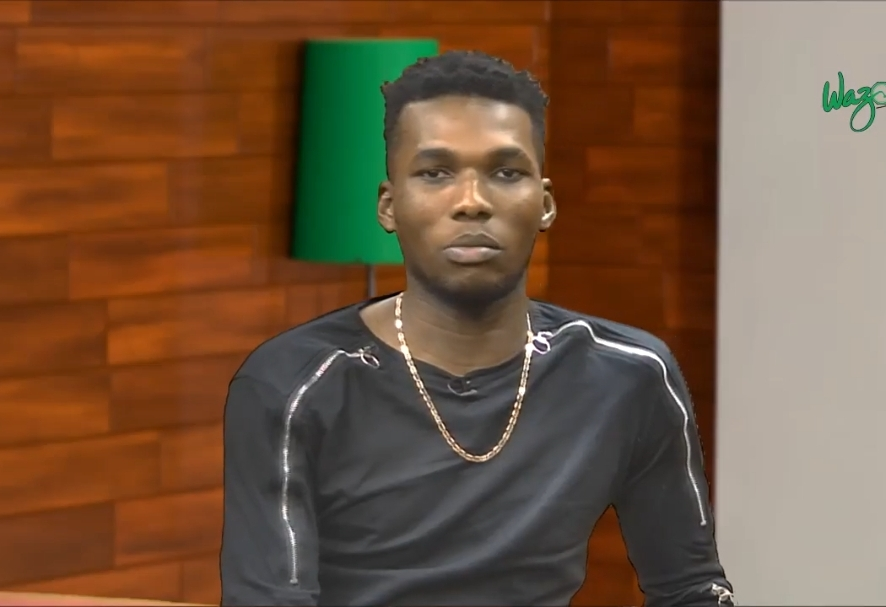

Background information
- Also known as: Red Eye, Old Warri
- Born: Victor Adere; 2 August 1993 (age 32); Kirikiri, Lagos State, Nigeria
- Origin: Ughelli, Delta State
- Genres: Afrobeats
- Occupations: Singer; songwriter; rapper
- Years active: 2017 –present
- Label: RED EYE

Victor Adere (born 2 August 1993), better known as Victor AD, is a Nigerian singer and songwriter.

== Biography ==
Victor Emmanuel Adere was born in Kirikiri, Apapa, Lagos State, where he grew up with his family. He is the second child of four children. He attended Heritage International School in Lagos and Ekpan Secondary School in Uvwie, Warri metropolitan area. He is a graduate of Auchi Polytechnic in Edo state, where he studied electrical engineering in 2017.

== Career ==
Victor began his music career in early 2014. He has worked with producers such as Kulboybeat, Kizzybeatz, ID Clef, and Mr Nolimitz. Victor AD's first music release was "Jowo"; the song became a theme song for Radio Continental.

In 2017, Victor AD released the single "No Idea". The music video for the song, which was shot and directed by Cinema House Images in late 2018, was endorsed by TV stations in Nigeria.

On 17 June 2018, Victor AD released the single "Wetin We Gain", and was discovered by the management company Longitude Promotions in 2018. The music video for "Wetin We Gain" has garnered more than 7 million views on YouTube.

== Awards and nominations ==
- Soundcity MVP Awards Festival: Listener's Choice nominee, 2018
- SSMA: Best Pop Single and Best New Act, 2018
- WEA: Street Song of the Year and Next Rated Artiste, 2018
- City People Magazine Award: Promising Act of the Year, 2018; Pop Artiste of the Year, 2019
- Ghana Meets Naija: Recognition Award, 2018
- Ghana 3Music Awards: Best African Act, 2019
- The Headies: Best Pop Single and Song of the Year nominations for "Wetin We Gain", 2019; Next Rated nominee, 2019

== Discography ==
=== Songs ===
List of songs, with selected details
Title	Details
Wetin We Gain	Release: 17 June 2018; Format: CD, Digital download
No Idea	Release: 2017; Label: ETINS Records; Format: CD, Digital download
Tire You	Release: 26 January 2019; Label: SJW Entertainment; Format: CD, Digital download
Why	Release: 10 February 2019; Label: SJW Entertainment; Format: CD, Digital download
Emoji	Release: 15 May 2019; Label: SJW Entertainment; Format: CD, Digital download
RED EYE (THE EP)	Release: 02 August 2019; Label: SJW Entertainment; Format: CD, Digital download
Too Much Money	Release: 16 October 2019; Label: SJW Entertainment; Format: CD, Digital download
Tomorrow	Release: 09 January 2020; Label: SJW Entertainment; Format: CD, Digital download
Prayer Request	Release: 10 July 2020; Label: SJW Entertainment; Format: CD, Digital download
Wet	Release: 26 November 2020; Label: SJW Entertainment; Format: CD, Digital download
Olofofo	Release: 14 May 2021; Label: Red Eye; Format: CD, Digital download
Nothing To Prove (EP)	Release: 30 July 2021; Label: Red Eye; Format: CD, Digital download
Omo Ologo	Release: 19 November 2021; Label: Red Eye; Format: CD, Digital download
Simple Life	Release: 2 August 2022; Label: Red Eye; Format: CD, Digital download
Realness Over Hype (album)	Release: 29 March 2024; Label: Red Eye & Ufuahs Nation/ONErpm; Format: CD, Digital download
