= TooXclusive =

Nigerian music website

tooXclusive
- tooXclusive logo

- "Screenshot"
- Website type: Music website
- Available in: English
- Owner: Tyler Duncan Sotubo
- Website: www.tooxclusive.com
- Commercial: Yes
- Registration: Optional
- Users: 3,592,000
- Launched: September 2010; 16 years ago
- Current status: Active
- Written in: html

tooXclusive is a Nigerian music and review website. Launched in 2010 by Olutayo "Tyler" Duncan Sotubo, the website is notable for organizing its yearly tooXclusive Online Music Awards. They pride their establishment as the number one source for pan-African music entertainment, reviews, trending news and celebrity updates.

== Overview ==
tooXclusive was launched in 2010 by editor-in-chief Olutayo "Tyler" Duncan Sotubo. They provide a complete package of music/video downloads, reviews, industry news, top 10 charts, interviews and other music related editorials.

tooXclusive in their over six-year stint have become known for stylized top 10 charts, music video downloads and editorial content. The top 10 chart is a countdown of Naija's finest in the music industry spanning different categories including Producers, Next Rated Acts, Hottest Artistes, and Banging Collaborations. The chart is put together by the TX team after much research and deliberation. Each chart features 10 Nigerian music acts that have excelled in specific categories and met certain criteria within a given time frame.

tooXclusive also publishes editorial content at including spotlight profiles of artistes, their materials (music and videos), and critical music reviews.

tooXclusive has sometimes been controversial for having shared a writer's opinion in perspective on how these artistes enact their music propaganda.

== tooXclusive Ghana ==
tooXclusive Ghana (or tooXclusive GH) is a branch of tooXclusive.com website which caters specifically for the needs of the fast growing Ghanaian music industry. The site features a comprehensive profile of Ghana's musical acts, songs, music videos and other entertainment related content.

Duncan Sotubo, CEO of tooXclusive, said, "The aim of tooxclusive from its inception has always been to be the biggest music distribution platform all over Africa and after a successful 4 years in Nigeria, we're convinced that we can comfortably branch out, offering the best of Ghanaian music to music lovers all over Africa."

== tooXclusive Music Awards ==
The tooXclusive Online Music Awards (#TxOMA) are annual online awards organized by the Nigerian music website tooXclusive. The early editions of the awards, held between in 2012 and 2013, included satirical categories ("Worst Video", "Retire-tist Award") and received limited coverage from independent sources. From 2014 onward, the awards became more formal, with winners reported by multiple media outlets. Voting for the awards is conducted exclusively online via the website, and recipients receive digital or custom-designed plaques.

=== History ===
The tooXclusive Online Music Awards began in 2012 as an online-based initiative by the website. The 2012 and 2013 editions featured a mix of standard and satirical categories and appeared to function largely as opinion-driven polls for site users. The first two editions received little coverage from independent media and differed in tone from later versions of the awards.

=== 2014 edition ===
The winners of 2014 edition of the tooXclusive Music Awards were revealed on 15 January 2015, following a period of online voting on the website. Davido led the nominations with nine nods and won four awards, including Artiste of the Year. Lil Kesh won Best New Artiste and three other awards, while Olamide received Album of the Year for Baddest Guy Ever Liveth (2013) and the Lyrical Titan award. Other recipients included Sarkodie, Tiwa Savage, the Mavins, Don Jazzy, 2Face Idibia, Ice Prince, Vector, DJ Xclusive, and Clarence Peters. According to the organizers, the results were determined through online polling involving more than 140,000 voters, with award plaques distributed after the announcement.

==== Winners and nominees ====
Album of the Year	Mixtape of the Year
Baddest Guy Ever Liveth – Olamide; Bed of Stone – Aṣa; No Guts No Glory – Phyno; Ayo – Wizkid; The Journey – Sean Tizzle; The Ascension – 2Face Idibia	A7 – Vector; Son of John – A-Q; Superiority Complex – Ozone; Westernized West African – Mojeed; Pharaoh of the New School – Kida Kudz; B.R.A — Phenom
Artiste of the Year	Best New Artiste
Davido; Olamide; Wizkid; Tiwa Savage; Yemi Alade; Phyno	Lil Kesh; Reekado Banks; CDQ; Kiss Daniel; Emmy Gee; Slyde
Male Artiste of the Year	Female Artiste of the Year
Davido; Wizkid; Olamide; Phyno; Sean Tizzle; Timaya	Tiwa Savage; Yemi Alade; Seyi Shay; Chidinma; Cynthia Morgan; Aṣa
Earth Shaking Collaboration	Certified Banger of the Year
"Shoki (Remix)" – Lil Kesh (featuring Davido and Olamide); "Tchelete" – Davido and Mafikizolo; "Girlie 'O' (Remix)" – Patoranking (featuring Tiwa Savage); "Dorobucci" – The Mavins; "Surulere" – Dr Sid (featuring Don Jazzy); "Gallardo" – Runtown (featuring Davido)	"Dorobucci" – The Mavins; "Shoki" – Lil Kesh; "Aye" – Davido; "Double Wahala" – Oritse Femi; "Johnny" – Yemi Alade; "Surulere" – Dr Sid (featuring Don Jazzy)
Video Wonder of the Year	Next to Blow
"Aye" – Davido (Dir. Clarence Peters); "Iyawo Mi" – Timi Dakolo (Dir. Clarence Peters); "Wanted" – Tiwa Savage (Dir. Moe Musa); "Komole" – Sean Tizzle (Dir. Aje Filmworks); "Onye" – Waje (featuring Tiwa Savage) (Dir. Kemi Adetiba); "Sitting on the Throne" – Olamide (Dir. Kemi Adetiba)	Lil Kesh; Runtown; Niniola; Cynthia Morgan; Yung L; BOJ
Extraordinaire Vocal Performance	Lyrical Titan
Ruby Gyang – "Good Man"; Timi Dakolo – "Iyawo Mi"; Flavour – "I'm for Real"; Cobhams Asuquo – "Ordinary People"; Simi – "Tiff"; Nosa – "Why You Love Me"	Olamide; Reminisce; Phyno; Mojeed; Jesse Jagz; Yung6ix
Best Afro-Pop Track	Best Hip-Hop Track
"Aye" – Davido; "Jasi" – Banky W.; "Dorobucci" – The Mavins; "Shake Body" – Skales; "Sanko" – Timaya; "Dance" – Tekno	"N Word" – Ice Prince; "Dobale" – Modenine (featuring Gentle); "Where is Vector" – Vector; "King James" – M.I; "Rands and Nairas" – Emmy Gee; "Deaf" – Eva Alordiah
Best R&B Track	Best Street-Hop Track
"Iyawo Mi" – Timi Dakolo; "Good Man" – Ruby Gyang; "I'm for Real" – Flavour; "Let Somebody Love You" – 2Face Idibia (featuring Bridget Kelly); "Plan B" – Wande Coal; "Why You Love Me" – Nosa	"Shoki (Remix)" – Lil Kesh (featuring Davido and Olamide); "Awon Goons Mi" – Olamide; "Banana" – Slyde; "Alobam" – Phyno; "Emergency" – WizzyPro (featuring Runtown, Skales, and Patoranking); "Fantasi" – Reminisce
Producer Genius of the Year	Super Record Label of the Year
Don Jazzy; Spellz; Masterkraft; Legendury Beatz; Pheelz; Shizzi	Mavin Records; Aristokrat Records; HKN Music; Chocolate City Music; Made Men Music Group
DJ on the Wheels	Oscar Director of the Year
DJ Xclusive; DJ Spinall; DJ Jimmy Jatt; DJ Neptune; DJ Caise; DJ Kentalky	Clarence Peters; Kemi Adetiba; Unlimited L.A; Aje Filmworks; Godfather Productions; Moe Musa
African Artiste of the Year	North American Artiste
Sarkodie; Cassper Nyovest; Diamond Platnumz; Fuse ODG; Efya; Mi Casa; Uhuru; Stanley Enow; Mafikizolo; Sauti Sol	Awon Boyz; Omar; BOS; Lord V; SplashJosh
Track with the Highest Sales/Downloads
"Dorobucci" – The Mavins

=== 2015 edition ===
At the 2015 tooXclusive Awards, Olamide led the winners, taking Artiste of the Year, Male Artiste of the Year, Certified Banger of the Year for "Shakiti Bobo", Best Street-Hop Track, Mixtape of the Year with Phyno for 2 Kings, and Album of the Year for Street OT (2014). Yemi Alade won Female Artiste of the Year, while Adekunle Gold earned Next to Blow. Diamond Platnumz received African Artiste of the Year, Seyi Shay won Extraordinaire Vocal Performance for "Right Now", and Ycee was named Best New Artiste. Other winners included Wizkid and Davido in major categories, Vector for Lyrical Titan, YBNL as Super Record Label of the Year, Unlimited L.A for Director of the Year, Young John as Producer Genius of the Year, and DJ Xclusive as DJ on the Wheels.

==== Winners and nominees ====
Album of the Year	Mixtape of the Year
Street OT – Olamide; Man of the Year – Skales; Baba Hafusa – Reminisce; The Chairman – M.I; Rich & Famous – Praiz	2 Kings – Olamide and Phyno; 30 Days of Mode 9 – Mode 9; This Is Not An Acronym – Boogey; Tales by Streetlight – T Rick; Son of John II — A-Q
Artiste of the Year	Best New Artiste
Olamide; Yemi Alade; Davido; Wizkid; Patoranking	Ycee; Koker; Dice Ailes; Viktoh; Toby Grey
Male Artiste of the Year	Female Artiste of the Year
Olamide; Davido; Wizkid; Lil Kesh; Patoranking	Yemi Alade; Seyi Shay; Tiwa Savage; Cynthia Morgan; Aṣa
Certified Banger of the Year	Video Wonder of the Year
"Shakiti Bobo" – Olamide; "Godwin" – Korede Bello; "Gbese" – Lil Kesh; "Ojuelegba" – Wizkid; "My Woman, My Everything" – Patoranking (featuring Wande Coal)	"Melo Melo" – Olamide; "Awww" – Di'Ja; "Satan Be Gone" – Aṣa; "Wish Me Well" – Timi Dakolo; "Crazy" – Seyi Shay (featuring Wizkid)
Next to Blow	Extraordinaire Vocal Performance
Adekunle Gold; CDQ; Small Doctor; Reekado Banks; Korede Bello	Seyi Shay – "Right Now"; Yemi Alade – "Duro Timi"; Timi Dakolo – "Wish Me Well"; Praiz – "If I Fall"; Cobhams Asuquo – "Do the Right Thing"
Lyrical Titan	Best Hip-Hop Track
Vector; Phyno; M.I; Reminisce; Boogey	"Local Rappers" – Reminisce (featuring Olamide and Phyno); "Bullion Van" – M.I (featuring Runtown, Phyno, and Stormrex); "King Kong (Remix)" – Vector (featuring Phyno, Reminisce, Classiq, and Uzikwendu); "Karishika" – Falz (featuring Phyno and Chigul); "Oringo" – Phyno
Best Afro-Pop Track	Best Street-Hop Track
"My Woman, My Everything" – Patoranking (featuring Wande Coal); "Coco Baby" – Waje (featuring Diamond Platnumz); "Gift" – Iyanya (featuring Don Jazzy); "Igbeyawo" – Oritse Femi; "Sisi" – Praiz (featuring Wizkid)	"Shakiti Bobo" – Olamide; "Godwin" – Korede Bello; "Laye" – Kiss Daniel; "Reggae Blues" – Harrysong (featuring Olamide, Iyanya, KCee, and Orezi); "Ladi" – Olamide and Phyno (featuring Lil Kesh)
Best R&B Track	Producer Genius of the Year
"Sade" – Adekunle Gold; "Right Now" – Seyi Shay; "Awww" – Di'Ja; "Duro Timi" – Yemi Alade; "Ololufe" – Flavour (featuring Chidinma); Shizzi	Young John; DJ Coublon; Don Jazzy; Masterkraft; Maleek Berry
Super Record Label of the Year	Oscar Director of the Year
YBNL; Choc Boi Nation; Mavin Records; Made Men Music Group; HKN Music	Unlimited L.A; Adasa Cookey; JM Films; Godfather Productions; Clarence Peters
DJ on the Wheels	African Artiste of the Year
DJ Xclusive; DJ Jimmy Jatt; DJ Spinall; DJ Kentalky; DJ Baddo	Diamond Platnumz; Sarkodie; Cassper Nyovest; AKA; Stonebwoy; Uhuru; Shatta Wale; Toofan; Vanessa Mdee; Sauti Sol

=== 2016 edition ===
The winners of the 2016 tooXclusive Awards were revealed on 16 January 2017, with Wizkid, Simi, and Falz all winning two awards each. Falz led with seven nominations, followed by Phyno and Kiss Daniel with five nominations each. Eligible works were released between September 2015 and October 2016, with nominees selected after vetting by tooXclusive editors and an external advisory panel that included DJ Jimmy Jatt, Tee-Y Mix, and Audu Maikori. Kiss Daniel won Album of the Year with New Era, while Wizkid led the major artist categories, winning both Artiste of the Year and Male Artiste of the Year. Tekno's Pana" was named Certified Banger of the Year, and Olamide's "Who You Epp?" won Best Street-Hop Track. Other notable winners included Simi as Female Artiste of the Year, Falz as Lyrical Titan, Young John as Producer Genius of the Year, DJ Spinall as DJ on the Wheels, and Diamond Platnumz as African Artiste of the Year.

==== Winners and nominees ====
Album of the Year	Producer Genius of the Year
New Era – Kiss Daniel; Gold – Adekunle Gold; Spotlight – Reekado Banks; R.E.D. – Tiwa Savage; Stories That Touch – Falz; Y.A.G.I – Lil Kesh	Young John; DJ Coublon; Don Jazzy; Masterkraft; Pheelz; Shizzi
Extraordinaire Vocal Performance	Artiste of the Year
Wande Coal – "Super Woman"; Timi Dakolo – "The Vow"; Sojay – "Holiday"; Miss Ige – "Hallelujah"; Waje – "Mountains"; Niniola – "Start All Over"	Wizkid; Falz; Kiss Daniel; Olamide; Phyno; Tekno; Tiwa Savage
Female Artiste of the Year	Male Artiste of the Year
Simi"; Tiwa Savage; Yemi Alade; Seyi Shay; Cynthia Morgan	Wizkid; Olamide; Kiss Daniel; Phyno; Falz; Tekno
Certified Banger of the Year	Best Street-Hop Track
"Pana" – Tekno; "Mama" – Kiss Daniel; "Fada Fada (Ghetto Gospel)" – Phyno (featuring Olamide); "Who You Epp?" – Olamide; "Osinachi" (Remix) – Humblesmith (featuring Davido); "Oluwa Ni" – Reekado Banks	"Who You Epp?" – Olamide; "Fada Fada (Ghetto Gospel)" – Phyno (featuring Olamide); "Bahd, Baddo, Baddest" – Falz (featuring Davido and Olamide); "Nowo E Soke" – CDQ (featuring Wizkid); "Kolewerk" – Koker; "Gbera" – Small Doctor
Best R&B Track	Collaboration of the Year
"Love Don't Care" – Simi; "Made for You" – Banky W.; "Aduke" – Tjan; "Love Me" – Aramide (featuring Adekunle Gold); "Akara Obimo" – Niniola	"Fada Fada (Ghetto Gospel)" – Phyno (featuring Olamide); "Bahd, Baddo, Baddest" – Falz (featuring Davido and Olamide); "Soldier" – Falz (featuring Simi); "No Kissing Baby" – Patoranking (featuring Sarkodie); "Osinachi" (Remix) – Humblesmith (featuring Davido); "Feeling the Beat" – DJ Jimmy Jatt (featuring Wizkid)
Video Wonder of the Year	Oscar Director of the Year
"Soldier" – Falz (featuring Simi); "If I Start to Talk" – Tiwa Savage (featuring Dr Sid); "Pray for Me" – Darey (featuring the Soweto Gospel Choir); "Gentleman" – Ric Hassani; "Jombo" – Kiss Daniel; "Love Don't Care" – Simi	Clarence Peters; Director Q; Unlimited L.A; Adasa Cookey; Aje Filmworks; Mex
DJ on the Wheels	Super Record Label of the Year
DJ Spinall; DJ Jimmy Jatt; DJ Enimoney; DJ Xclusive; DJ Obi; DJ Lambo	YBNL; Mavin Records; Choc Boi Nation; Davido Music Worldwide; Starboy Entertainment; Five Star Music
Next Rated	Lyrical Titan
'Ycee; Humblesmith; Niniola; Terry Apala; Koker; Mayorkun	Falz; Jesse Jagz; Vector; Boogey; Reminisce; Poe
African Artiste of the Year	Fresh Face 2016 Finalists (winner not announced)
Diamond Platnumz; Sarkodie; Cassper Nyovest; Vanessa Mdee; AKA; Sauti Sol; Stonebwoy; Mr Eazi	HighBee – "Money (OWO)"; Razemula – "Mu Jo"; Leke Lee – "Gbim Gbim Gbim"; GloryChild – "Anaconda"; Shola Tyson – "Okpekete"

== Awards and nominations ==
Year	Event	Prize	Result
2012	2012 Nigeria Entertainment Awards	Music Website of the Year	Nominated
2013	2013 Nigerian Blog Award	Music Blog of the Year	Won
2015	City People Entertainment Awards	Music Website of The Year	Nominated
2015	Scream All Youths Awards	Your Favorite Blog	Nominated
2014	City People Entertainment Awards	Music Website of The Year	Nominated
2016	The Beatz Awards	Best Online Music Platform	Won
2017	The Beatz Awards	Best Online Music Platform	Won
2018	The Beatz Awards	Best Online Music Platform	Won
2019	The Beatz Awards	Best Online Music Platform	Won
2020	The Beatz Awards	Best Online Music Platform	Won
2021	The Beatz Awards	Best Online Music Platform	▼
