= Pheelz production discography =

- Studio albums: 14
- EPs: 1
- Singles: 16

The following list is a discography of production by Pheelz, a Nigeria record producer from Lagos State.

== Singles ==
- "First of All" – Olamide (2012)
- "Hustle" - Pheelz (2015)
- "Durosoke" – Olamide (2012)
- "Rayban Abacha" - Olamide (2013)
- "Popular" (feat. Pheelz) - Vector (2013)
- "Eleda Mi O" – Olamide (2014)
- "Dope Money" – Olamide (2014)
- "Lagos Boys" – Olamide (2015)
- "Melo Melo" – Olamide (2015)
- "Matters Arising" – Olamide (2015)
- "P-Popping" - Viktoh (2018)
- "Follow Me" - Guccimaneko (feat. Olamide) (2018)
- "Onyeoma" - Phyno (feat. Olamide) (2018)
- "Owo Shayo" - Olamide (2018)
- "Gobe" (with. Naira Marley, and Olamide ) - Pheelz (2019)
- "Spirit" - Olamide (2019)
- "Crown Of Clay" (feat. Pheelz) - M.I, and Vector (2021)
- "Raise Your Hand" (feat. Teni) - Reekado Banks (2021)
- "Stand Strong" (feat. Sunday Service Choir) - Davido (2022)

== Studio albums ==
Year	Artist	Album	Tracks produced
2012	Olamide	YBNL	Pheelz produced all tracks, aside from track #5 "Voice of the Street" #6 "Panumo" (feat. Davido) #8 "Picture" #11 "Ilefo Illuminati" #15 "Stupid Love" #18 "International Local" (feat. Tiwa Savage)
2013	Olamide	Baddest Guy Ever Liveth	Pheelz produced all tracks, aside from track #13 "Sitting on the Throne"
2014	Olamide	Street OT	Pheelz produced all tracks, aside from track #2 "Zero Joy" #3 "Blood Money" #6 "The Real MVP" #9 "Prayer For Client" #14 "Falila Ketan" #18 "Story For The Gods"
2014	M.I	The Chairman	#16 "Human Being" (feat. 2face Idibia, and Sound Sultan)
2015	Olamide & Phyno	2 Kings	#1 "Cypher" #2 "Koba Koba" #3 "Nobody's Fault" #7 "Real Nigga" #9 "Carry Me Go" (feat. Storm Rex) #10 "For My City"
2015	Runtown	Ghetto University	#9 "Tuwo Shinkafa" (feat. Barbapappa) #16 "Tuwo Shinkafa (Moroccan Version)" (feat. Barbapappa)
2015	Seyi Shay	Seyi or Shay	#9 "Pack And Go" (feat. Olamide)
2015	Olamide	Eyan Mayweather	Pheelz produced all tracks, aside from track #4 "Where The Man?" #5 "Igara Chicken" #7 "Ball" #17 "Sold Out" #17 "Bobo"
2015	Spinall	My Story: The Album	#16 "No Sorrow" (feat. Pheelz)
2018	Mr Eazi	Life Is Eazi, Vol. 2 - Lagos to London	#2 "Surrender" (feat. Simi)
2019	Fireboy DML	Laughter, Tears and Goosebumps	#1 "Need You" #3 "Scatter" #5 "Energy" #7 "Gbas Gbos" #10 "High on Life" #12 "What If I Say" #13 "Wait and See"
2019	Olamide	Double	#8 "Poverty Die"
2019	Teni	Billionaire	#1 "Nowo"
2021	Teni	WONDALAND	#4 "GAME OVER" #5 "HUSTLE" #8 "INJURE ME" #12 "WONDA WHY"

== EPs ==
Year	Artist	EP	Note
2021	Pheelz	Hear Me Out	Pheelz produced all tracks
