= Wo (song) =

Single by Olamide

from the album Lagos Nawa
- Released: 7 August 2017
- Length: 3:03
- Label: YBNL Nation
- Songwriter: Olamide Adedeji
- Producer: Young Jonn

Olamide singles chronology
| "001" (2017) | "Wo" (2017) | "Telli Person" (2017) |

Music video
- "Wo" on YouTube

"Wo" (stylized "Wo!!") is a song by Nigerian rapper Olamide. It was produced by Young Jonn and released on 7 August 2017, via the rapper's record label YBNL Nation. The song was the only single from the album Lagos Nawa (2017). Nigerian singer Wizkid considered "Wo" to be the biggest Nigerian song of 2017.

== Composition ==
"Wo" is a street-pop and hip-hop track produced by Young Jonn. It features a fast-paced, hard-hitting beat built on synth piano harmonies and an ominous bassline. The song includes repeated chants of "wo" ("look" in Yoruba) that run through the production. Olamide delivers Yoruba street lyrics over the instrumental, including the line "oya jo bi olowo, ma lo jo bi oloshi."

== Critical reception ==
"Wo" received positive reviews from music critics. Umar Hassan of YNaija described it as "a street recipe served on an irresistible dance platter" where Olamide "weaves impeccably through an infectious Young John beat to make the safest bet for next big hit of 2017." IfeOluwa Nihinlola, writing for Music in Africa, praised the song's beat, which she described as "sparse, simple and extremely danceable," and Olamide's use of "coded" Yoruba lyrics that "sent a dog-whistle to his fans on the streets."

== #WoChallenge ==
Olamide created the #WoChallenge to promote "Wo" and reward fans who took part in the dance competition. The original prize was ₦1 million for the best dancer, but after receiving many entries, he increased the total prize to ₦3 million, with ₦1 million awarded to each of the three winners. Ogundeji Azeez Ayobami became the first winner and received a one-million naira cheque. The challenge mainly ran on Instagram and attracted a large number of participants, with dancers sharing entries online.

== Music video ==
The music video for "Wo" was directed by Unlimited L.A and filmed in Bariga, Olamide's birthplace. It was released on 16 August 2017, shortly after the song's debut. The video features cameos from Young Jonn, DJ Enimoney, Viktoh, and winners of the #WoChallenge. The music video surpassed one million views on YouTube within a week, with Olamide expressing gratitude to fans for their support. The video drew criticism from the Federal Ministry of Health for allegedly promoting tobacco use in violation of the Nigerian Tobacco Control Act of 2015. Olamide denied the allegations, stating on Twitter that he had no intention of encouraging tobacco use.

== Impact ==
"Wo" played a big role in popularizing the shaku shaku dance, which originated in the streets of Agege. In the song's music video, dancers are seen performing it. The video reached over 15 million views on YouTube within five months, helping move the dance from street scenes in Agege into mainstream visibility.

In September 2017, American rapper and producer Swizz Beatz posted a video of him dancing to the song on his Instagram. In October 2017, Nigerian singer Wizkid posted to his Twitter that "Wo" was the biggest Nigerian song of the year.

== Accolades ==
Awards and nominations for "Wo"
| Organization | Year | Category | Result | Ref. |
|---|---|---|---|---|
| Soundcity MVP Awards Festival | 2017 | Listener's Choice | Won | |
| Soundcity MVP Awards Festival | 2017 | Viewer's Choice | Nominated | |
| Soundcity MVP Awards Festival | 2017 | Song of the Year | Nominated | |
| The Headies | 2018 | Best Street-Hop Artiste (Olamide for "Wo") | Nominated | |
| The Headies | 2018 | Song of the Year | Nominated | |
| All Africa Music Awards | 2018 | Best Male Artist in Western Africa (Olamide for "Wo") | Nominated | |

== Personnel ==
- Olamide Adedeji - vocals, songwriting
- Young Jonn - production

== Release history ==
Release history and formats for "Wo"
| Region | Date | Format | Label |
|---|---|---|---|
| Various | 7 August 2017 | Digital download | YBNL Nation |
