= Bobo (Olamide song) =

Single by Olamide

from the album Eyan Mayweather
- Released: 2 May 2015
- Genre: Afropop
- Length: 4:38
- Label: YBNL
- Songwriter: Olamide Adedeji
- Producer: Young Jonn

Olamide singles chronology
"Bad" (2015)	"Bobo" (2015)	"Chop Ogbono (Remix)" (2015)

Music video
- "Bobo" on YouTube

"Bobo" (also known as "Shakiti Bobo") is a song by Nigerian hip hop recording artist Olamide from his fifth studio album Eyan Mayweather. Produced by Young Jonn, the song was released on 2 May 2015 through YBNL Nation. With a view of promoting "Bobo", a dance style called "Shakiti Bobo" was named after the song. "Bobo" was nominated in the "Song of the Year" category at The Headies 2015. American music magazine Billboard ranked it #23 on their list of The 50 Best Afrobeats Songs of All Time. In May 2015, singer Olowu Taiwo, known as LT, alleged that the dance associated with the song was taken from his earlier "Yobo" dance, which he said he had shared publicly before the song’s release. LT claimed he released the audio of his own song on 22 April 2015 and a related video on 6 May 2015, shortly before the dance gained wider attention through Olamide’s single. There was no response from Olamide's management about the controversy.

== Background ==
"Bobo" was the first solo single by Olamide after the release of the joint album 2 Kings (2015) with Phyno. In a 2015 interview with filmmaker Tunde Kelani, Olamide said the title and chant of the song were inspired by a local nursery rhyme he heard while growing up in Bariga.

== Reception ==
"Bobo" was met with positive reviews among music critics and numerous airplay. Tola Bolaji of Nigerian Entertainment Today described the song as a combination of "rap and poetry" and further went on to state that: "This song obviously goes beyond the leg jumping to meet the hand rhythmic dance steps. It has a message. Next time take more time in listening to the message of Nigerian songs. You might just be lucky to meet one, just like a song writer in Naija said, one in a million".

Henry Igwe of 360Nobs stated the song was "mellow, catchy, and carries tingly features that can freeze the industry heartbeat today, and get the people listening". As for the video, he concluded that it was "super cool material that should keep him relevant some more in the mix".

== Music video ==
The music video for "Bobo" was released on 7 May 2015. Directed by Mr. Moe Musa, the video which features cameo appearances from then-label mates Viktoh, Lil Kesh, and Chinko Ekun, was shot on location at the Lagos Oriental Hotel in Victoria Island. By July 2015, the video reached one million views on YouTube.

== Accolades ==
Year	Award ceremony	Prize	Result	Ref
2015	All Africa Music Awards 2015	Best Male Artiste in Western Africa (Olamide for "Bobo")	Won	
2015	All Africa Music Awards 2015	Artist of the Year (Olamide for "Bobo")	Nominated	
2015	COSON Song Awards 2015	Best Dance Song	Nominated	
2016	The Headies 2015	Best Pop Single	Nominated	
2016	The Headies 2015	Song of the Year	Nominated	
2016	The Headies 2015	Best Street-Hop Artiste (Olamide for "Bobo")	Won	
2016	The Headies 2015	Producer of the Year (Young John for "Bobo")	Won	
2016	tooXclusive Awards 2015	Certified Banger of the Year	Won	
2016	tooXclusive Awards 2015	Best Street-Hop Track	Won	
