= Pepenazi =

Nigerian singer-songwriter and preacher (born 1988)

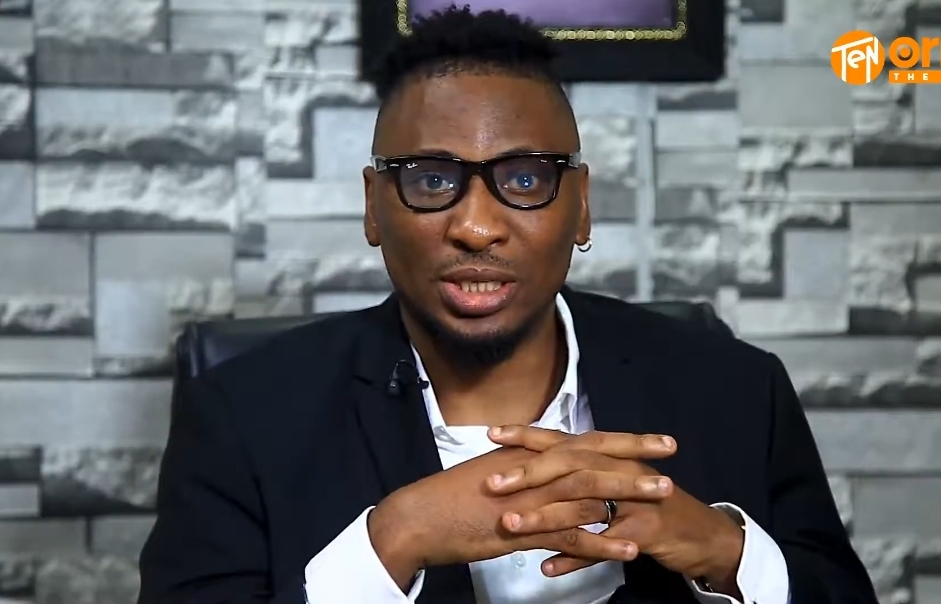

Background information
- Also known as: PepeIllegal
- Born: Opeyemi Gbenga Kayode; 16 April 1988 (age 38)
- Origin: Odigbo, Ondo State, Nigeria
- Genres: Hip hop, AfroPop, dance hall
- Occupations: Rapper, songwriter
- Years active: 2012 – present
- Label: Ecleftic Entertainment
- Website: www.pepenazi.com

Opeyemi Gbenga Kayode (born April 16, 1988), known by his stage name Pepenazi, is a Nigerian singer, songwriter, and a Preacher of Christ.

== Early life and education ==
Gbenga was born in Lagos and grew up listening to Ebenezer Obey, King Sunny Adé, The Beatles, I. K. Dairo, and Fela Kuti. He received his primary education at Kemeesther Nursery and Primary School in Aguda, Surulere, Lagos. Pepenazi had his secondary-school education at Mayflower School in Ikenne, Ogun State, where his growing interest in rap emerged as he listened to Wyclef Jean, the Notorious B.I.G, P. Diddy, Fat Joe and others. He graduated with a Bachelor of Technology degree in Estate Management from the Federal University of Technology, Akure, Ondo State, where he recorded his first single. Pepenazi won a student election to become the Student Union's Director of Socials and participated in an album, Futa's Finest.

== Career ==
=== 2012–2014 ===
Pepenazi debuted in the Nigerian music business in 2012 with the release of his rap hit "Arose." It was produced by Bam Toons and was accompanied by a music video. Pepenazi, however, took a hiatus from the entertainment scene as a final-year student and joined the National Youth Service Corps, where he won the 2013 Airtel NYSC Lagos Camp Freestyle Competition. He made appearances on two Olamide albums: Baddest Guy Ever Liveth (on "Motivation," alongside Ice Prince and Endia) and Street OT (on "Usain Bolt P," alongside Lil Kesh and Chinko Ekun). In October 2014, he released two tracks ("Born You" and "Low") that gained some attention.

=== 2015–2016 ===
He released "Adam," a hardcore rap single with Olamide, on February 8, 2015. On May 22 of the same year, Pepenazi released an alternative single "Fifemayo" followed by a music video a week later. His "Low" video included Iyanya, Sound Sultan, Lil Kesh, Samklef, DJ Spinall, and Viktoh in cameo appearances.

Pepenazi then featured Olamide on "Illegal," a pop single which became his major hit. Although Pepenazi's featuring of Olamide triggered speculations that he was signed to YBNL Nation (Olamide's label), he said in a Green News that his label (Ecleftic Entertainment) was only affiliated with YBNL Nation. "Illegal" was ranked as a top five dance-stimulating Nigerian song.

According to Jim Donnett of tooxclusive.com, Pepenazi was a performer to watch. He performed at the Ibadan edition of Star Trek on August 30, 2015, and was nominated for Rookie of the Year during the 2015 Headies Awards.

Pepenazi was nominated and won the Most Promising Artist of the Year award at the 2015 Scream Awards and Revelation/Industry's Cynosure of the year at the 2015 MoreKlue All Youths Awards (MAYA). He released "One For The Road" (produced by Pheelz) in 2016, followed by a video and the dance-hall single "Iwo Na (Your Wishes)" with YBNL Nation's Lil Kesh.

In addition to his solo work, Pepenazi was featured on "Gone are the Days" (with DJ Exclusive and Olamide), "Obi Remix" (with Skales and Reminisce), "Motivation" (with Olamide, Ice Prince and Endia), "In Da Mix" (with DJ Snoop), "Dishanku" (with Slay Velli), "Shut Down" (with DJ CLASSIC), "Eran" (with Pjay and Indomix), "Usain Bolt P" (with Olamide, Lil Kesh and Chinko Ekun), and "Designer Remix" (with Tipsy Araga, Xino, and Chinko Ekun). He has worked with several producers, including Pheelz, Dapiano, Young John, T Mode, Drey Beatz, Oga Jojo and Htee.

=== 2017 ===
Pepenazi traveled to South Africa and performed at the Harem and Moloko clubs. He then released videos for "I Ain't Gat No Time (Male Remix)" (featuring Reminisce and Falz) and the song's female remix, featuring Lucy Q, Phlow, and Mz Kiss. Pepenazi released "Ase," featuring Tiwa Savage and Masterkraft, on May 15, which was followed by a video and the launch of his website on June 5. Pepenazi released another dance-hall single, "Jabo", on August 2.

== Notable performances ==
He appeared at the 2014 and 2015 editions of Copa Lagos. In 2015, Pepenazi performed at the 2015 Star Trek grand finale in Lagos. He appeared in season two of Olamide Live in Concert (OLIC 2), and performed at the December 2015 One Lagos Fiesta.

== Discography ==
Lead artist
Year	Title	Album
2019	"Necessary" (featuring Shizzo)	
2017	"Jabo"	
2017	"Ase" (featuring Tiwa Savage, Masterkraft)	
2017	"I Ain't Gat No Time Remix" (featuring Mz Kiss, Lucy Q, Phlow)	
2016	"High Go"	
2016	"I Ain't Gat No Time Remix" (featuring Reminisce, Falz)	
2016	"I Ain't Gat No Time"	
2016	"Iwo Na" (featuring Lil Kesh)	
2016	"One For The Road"	
2015	"Illegal" (Featuring Olamide)	
2015	"Fifemayo"	
2015	"Adam" (featuring Olamide)	
2014	"Low"	
2014	"Born You"	
2012	"Arose"	
Featured artist
2013	"Motivation" (Olamide, featuring Iceprince, Pepenazi and Endia)	Baddest Guy Ever Liveth
2014	"Usain Bolt" (Olamide, featuring Lil Kesh, Pepenazi and Chinko Ekun)	Street OT
2014	"Sisi Eko" (Konga)	
2014	"In Da Mix" (DJ Snoop da Damaja)	
2015	"Obi Remix" (Skales, also featuring Reminisce)	Man of The Year
2015	"Gone Are The Days" (DJ Xclusive, also featuring Olamide)	According to X
2015	"Igboro" (Samklef, also featuring K Switch)	Sound of Muzic
2016	"Eran" (Pjay, also featuring Indomix)	
2016	"Dishanku" (Slay Velli)	
2016	"Shut Down" (DJ CLASSIC)	
2016	"Designer Remix" (Tipsy Araga, also featuring Xino and Chinko Ekun)	
2017	"Chineye Remix" (SoJay, also featuring Aramide)	

== Awards ==
Year	Event	Award	Result	Ref
2015	Scream Awards	Most Promising Artist of the Year	Won	
2015	MoreKlue All Youths Awards (MAYA)	Revelation / Industry's Cynosure of the Year	Won	
2015	The Headies	Rookie of the Year	Nominated	
