= Y.A.G.I =

Studio album by Lil Kesh
- Released: March 17, 2016
- Recorded: 2014–2016
- Genre: Afro pop; rap
- Label: YBNL
- Producer: Young Jonn; Pheelz; Shizzi

Lil Kesh chronology
Y.A.G.I (2016)	Ecstasy (2020)

Singles from Y.A.G.I
- 1. "Lyrically" Released: January 3, 2014; 2. "Efejoku" Released: July 8, 2015; 3. "Is It Because I Love You?" Released: October 1, 2015; 4. "Ibile" Released: January 4, 2016; 5. "Cause Trouble" Released: March 1, 2016; 6. "Cause Trouble, Pt. 2" Released: March 12, 2016

Y.A.G.I (an acronym for Young And Getting It) is the debut studio album by Nigerian rapper Lil Kesh. Released through YBNL Nation on March 17, 2016, the album features appearances from guest acts Phyno, Ycee, Wale, Patoranking, Adekunle Gold, Olamide, Davido, Viktoh and Chinko Ekun with production from Shizzi and former in-house producers Young Jonn and Pheelz.

== Background ==
Lil Kesh began pursuing music professionally in 2012. In 2014, he gained wider attention with the song "Lyrically", which led to his signing with YBNL Nation after being introduced to Olamide by Viktoh. Later that year, he released "Shoki", the song that brought him national recognition. Following the success of several singles, Lil Kesh released his debut studio album Y.A.G.I, an acronym for Young And Getting It, two years after the release of "Shoki".

== Critical reception ==
Upon its release, the album was met with mixed reviews by music enthusiasts and critics. Osareme Edeoghon, a writer for Music in Africa, described the album as "not quite satisfactory" and further went on to state that: "His rhyming is average; the album yields only a few memorable lines, [...] YAGI isn't a bad album. And were it not for the events that preceded its release, it might be said to be satisfactory". Joey Akan, a respected columnist of Pulse Nigeria gave the album 3 out of 5 stars, stating that: "Lil Kesh's first effort is a win for him, and for the street life. [...] "Y.A.G.I" stands tall as one of the most relatable works from rappers.

Oluwatobi Ibironke of tooXclusive rated the album 3.2 out of 5 stating that: "The bottom line point is, YAGI could have been a great album with lucid critic silencing qualities, but no. It turned out an average album with a lot of flavour for club acceptance"., Wilfred Okiche of 360nobs called Y.A.G.I "heady, juvenile, and full of youthful impulsiveness," adding that "Kesh's infectious delivery makes it relatable."

== Track listing ==
Y.A.G.I track listing
No.	Title	Producer (s)	Length
1.	"FSU (F**k S**t Up)"	Pheelz	4:08
2.	"Ishe"	Pheelz	3:56
3.	"Semilore"	Young John	3:36
4.	"Skit 1"	—	1:32
5.	"Cause Trouble" (featuring Ycee)	Pheelz	3:13
6.	"Abija Wara" (featuring Phyno & Chinko Ekun)	Pheelz	3:25
7.	"Is It Because I Love You?" (featuring Patoranking)	Pheelz; Young John	3:54
8.	"Jabo"	Pheelz	3:30
9.	"Itunmo" (featuring Xino)	Young John	3:54
10.	"For You"	Pheelz	3:41
11.	"Skit 2 (Cause Trouble)"	—	0:34
12.	"Efejoku" (featuring Viktoh)	Young John	4:05
13.	"Cause Trouble Pt. 2" (featuring Wale)	Pheelz	3:36
14.	"Problem Child" (featuring Olamide)	Pheelz	3:30
15.	"Life of a Star" (featuring Adekunle Gold)	Pheelz	3:25
16.	"Igba Iponju"	Young John	3:25
17.	"Ibile"	Pheelz; Young John	4:05
18.	"Yaya Oyoyo" (featuring Davido)	Shizzi	4:00
19.	"Lyrically"	Pheelz	3:24
Total length:			68:33

Notes

- "—" denotes a skit

== Release history ==
Country	Date	Format	Label
Nigeria	March 17, 2016	Digital download	YBNL
