= The Glory (Olamide album) =

Studio album by Olamide
- Released: 26 December 2016
- Genre: Hip-hop
- Length: 53:07
- Label: YBNL Nation
- Producer: Pheelz; Shizzi; Paul Cleverlee; Young Jonn; DwillsHarmony; Major Bangz; H.O.D; 2Kriss; Sossick

Olamide chronology
Eyan Mayweather (2015)	The Glory (2016)	Lagos Nawa (2017)

Singles from The Glory
- 1. "Who You Epp?" Released: 26 April 2016; 2. "Owo Blow" Released: 20 August 2016; 3. "Omo Wobe Anthem" Released: 6 December 2016

The Glory is the sixth studio album by Nigerian rapper Olamide. It was released on 26 December 2016 by YBNL Nation, and features guest appearances from Davolee, Wande Coal, Burna Boy, Phyno, Sossick and Akuchi. Production was handled by Pheelz, Shizzi, Paul Cleverlee, Young Jonn, DwillsHarmony, Major Bangz, H.O.D, 2Kriss, and Sossick, while mixing and mastering was handled by B.Banks. The album serves as a follow-up to Eyan Mayweather (2015). The Glory debuted at number six on the Billboard World Albums chart and spent two weeks on the chart.

== Background ==
Olamide announced the title and release date to the album on 18 November 2016, stating, "It'll be a hip hop album this time, no experimenting, just rap. I'm doing this for the culture and hardcore fans." The album was released on 26 December 2016, coinciding with his third OLIC (Olamide Live in Concert) at the Eko Hotels and Suites in Victoria Island. He shared the track list on 17 December 2016.

== Singles ==
The album's lead single is the remix of his 2016 single "Who You Epp?". Titled "Who You Epp? (Refix)", it features Wande Coal and Phyno and was released on 26 April 2016, with production by Shizzi. The second single "Owo Blow" was released on 20 August 2016 and was produced by Major Bangz. The third single "Omo Wobe Anthem" features Burna Boy and was released on 6 December 2016. The song was produced by Pheelz. On 19 December 2016, the music video for the, Dwills-produced intro to the album was released; it was directed by Mr. Moe Musa.

== Critical reception ==
Sabo Kpade, writing for OkayAfrica, said the album showed Olamide "now at the height of his powers," further calling it "a victory lap" and "a survey of all he's achieved so far," and adding that it "cements what few doubted about Olamide's ascendancy." Joey Akan of Pulse Nigeria praised The Glory for its honest portrayal of Olamide's street roots and lyrical prowess, noting that "he wins for effort... and above all, he wins for the streets," though he added that it was still "far from a being a classic project." He gave it a rating of 3.5 out of 5. In a review for YNaija, Wilfred Okiche praised The Glory for its thematic simplicity, strong production, and Olamide's return to his rap roots, noting that "critics... can finally point to The Glory and consider it the one fine moment where Olamide almost had it all together." Osareme Edeoghon of Music in Africa described The Glory as Olamide's most stylish rap album of 2016, highlighting his commitment to local collaborations and themes that explore his legacy and societal issues, noting that "no matter what we do, they'll never respect us." Filter Free's Chiagoziem Onyekwena said that The Glory showed Olamide as a "student of the game" who balanced storytelling and gratitude, calling the album "unique" and highlighting its "forthrightness" and "inspirational" themes. He concluded that it demonstrated Olamide's focus on crafting full projects rather than relying solely on hits, and rated it a 69%.

=== Accolades ===
Year	Awards ceremony	Award description(s)	Results
2017	Nigeria Entertainment Awards	Album of the Year	Won
2018	The Headies	Best Rap Album	Nominated

== Track listing ==
The Glory track listing
No.	Title	Writer(s)	Producer(s)	Length
1.	"The Glory Intro"	Olamide Adedeji	Dwills	1:36
2.	"Letter to Milli"	Adedeji	Pheelz	4:02
3.	"Journey of a Thousand Miles"	Adedeji	Pheelz	4:08
4.	"Underground" (featuring Akuchi)	Adedeji; Akuchi Osayaba	H.O.D	3:56
5.	"Pepper Dem Gang" (featuring Davolee)	Adedeji; Shokoya Oluwasegunfunmi	Young Jonn	3:39
6.	"Lori Titi Yi"	Adedeji	Pheelz	3:21
7.	"Grind" (featuring Sossick)	Adedeji; Esosa Osemwengie	Sossick	3:24
8.	"Woyo"	Adedeji	Young Jonn	2:54
9.	"Be Mine"	Adedeji	Pheelz	2:56
10.	"Oluwa Loni Glory"	Adedeji	Paul Cleverlee	4:33
11.	"Omo Wobe Anthem" (featuring Burna Boy)	Adedeji; Damini Ogulu	Pheelz	3:07
12.	"Owo Blow"	Adedeji	Major Bangz	3:39
13.	"Symbol of Hope"	Adedeji	2Kriss	3:10
14.	"Who You Epp? (Refix)" (featuring Wande Coal and Phyno)	Adedeji; Oluwatobi Ojosipe; Chibuzor Azubuike	Shizzi	3:52
15.	"Sons of Anarchy" (featuring Burna Boy and Phyno)	Adedeji; Ogulu; Azubuike	Pheelz	2:20

Bonus tracks
No.	Title	Writer(s)	Producer(s)	Length
16.	"2Baba Zone"	Adedeji	Pheelz	2:24
Total length:				53:07

== Personnel ==
Credits adapted from back cover.

- Sossick – production (track 7)
- Paul Cleverlee – production (track 10)
- Shizzi – production (track 10)
- Major Bangz – production (track 12)
- H.O.D - production (track 4)
- 2Kriss – production (track 13)
- Dwills - production (track 1)
- Young Jonn - production (track 5, 8)
- Pheelz - production (tracks 2, 3, 6, 9, 11, 15, 16)
- B.Banks - mixing, mastering

== Charts ==
=== Weekly charts ===
Chart performance for The Glory
Chart (2017)	Peak position
US World Albums (Billboard)	6

== Release history ==
Release history and formats for The Glory
Region	Date	Format	Label
Various	26 December 2016	Digital download	YBNL Nation
