= Superstar YB =

Nigerian-Irish singer-songwriter and producer

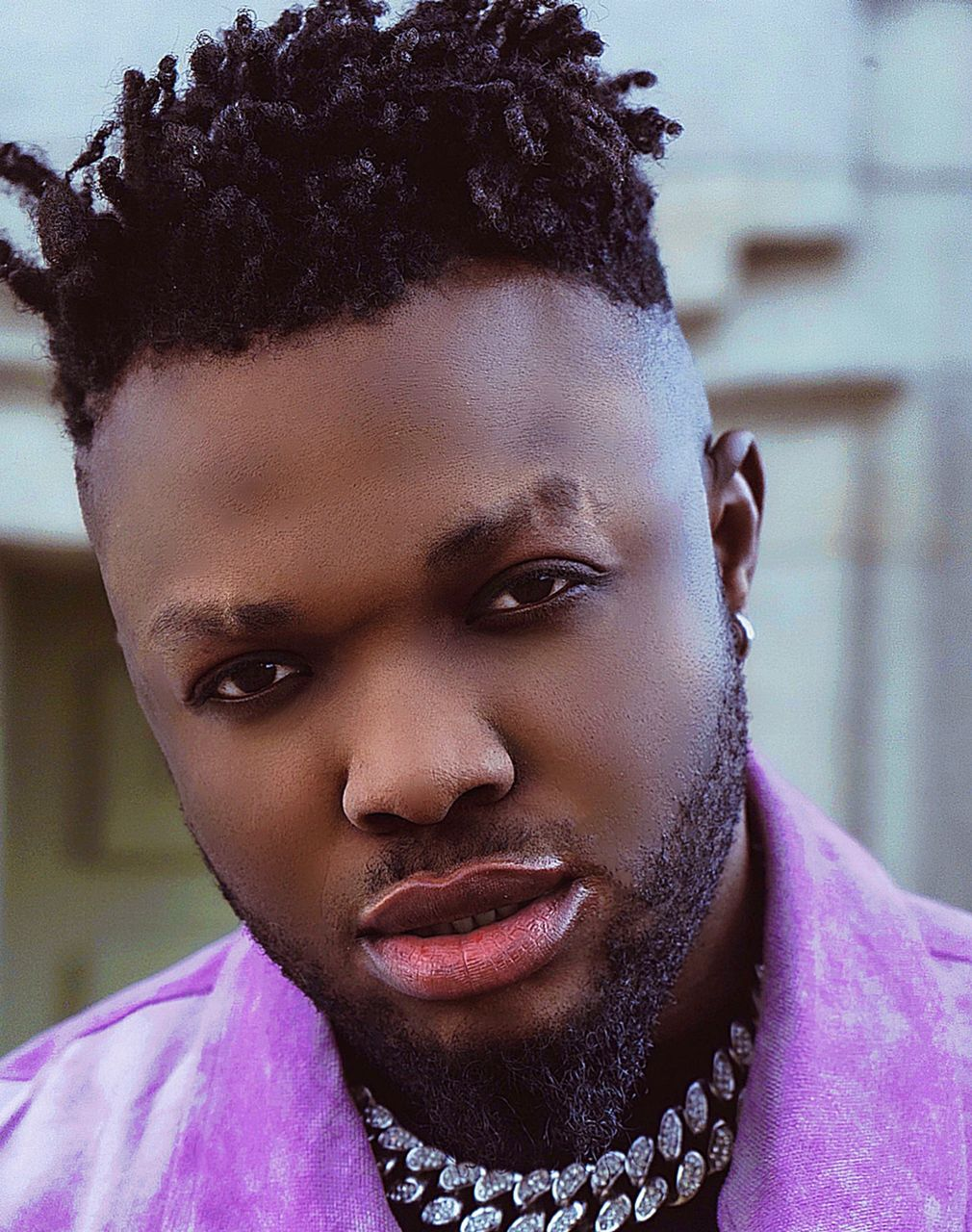

Background information
- Also known as: Yungblnkz
- Born: Abimbola Jeremiah Popoola; Benin City, Edo State
- Genres: Afropop; Afrobeats
- Occupations: Singer-songwriter, record producer
- Years active: 2015–present
- Label: Superstar Music Worldwide

Abimbola Jeremiah Popoola, professionally known as Superstar YB and previously as Yungblnkz is a Nigerian-Irish singer-songwriter and music producer.

== Biography ==
Superstar YB with origins in Ibadan, Oyo State, was born in Benin City, Edo State.

Due to his family being music lovers, he organized a music group when he was 11-year-old where he was the singer and songwriter. YB graduated with a diploma in people management and business administration from National College of Ireland.

Superstar YB who was previously known as Yungblnkz released his extended play Afro King in 2022, which corporates his hit single "Bottles" which was previously released in 2020. In 2024, the ultra version of Afro King which comprises six tracks with SMW was released.

In 2025, after his 2025 single “Commando” achieved debuts at number one on Nigerian charts, the momentum helped singles “Undercover lover” and “Faaji” featuring Terry Apala to reach numbers 1 and 2 respectively on the Nigerian Deezer chart. “Love In Lagos” featuring Chinko Ekun climbed to number 1 on Apple music viral songs chart in Los Angeles, California.

== Artistry ==
Superstar YB cites Fela Kuti, Majek Fashek and King Sunny Ade as some of his inspirations.

== Discography ==
=== Singles ===
- "Bottles"
- "Bottles (Amapiano Version)"
- "Party"
- "My Boo"
- "Play"
- "Gum Body"
- "Love In Lagos" ft. Chinko Ekun
- "Love in Lagos" (solo version)
- "Jealous (Faaji)" ft. Terry Apala
- "Jealous (Faaji) [Disco Version]" with Terry Apala

=== EPs ===
- Afro King
- Afro King (Ultra Version)
