= Lagos Nawa =

2017 Album by Olamide

Studio album by Olamide
- Released: 17 November 2017
- Genre: Afrobeats
- Length: 59:04
- Label: YBNL Nation
- Producer: Young Jonn; Olamide

Olamide chronology
The Glory (2016)	Lagos Nawa (2017)	YBNL Mafia Family (2018)

Singles from Lagos Nawa
- 1. "Wo" Released: 7 August 2017

Lagos Nawa (stylized Lagos Nawa!, also known by the full title Lagos Nawa (Wobey Sound)) is the seventh studio album by Nigerian rapper Olamide. It was released on 17 November 2017 through YBNL Nation and features guest appearances from Tiwa Savage, Phyno, Timaya and Reminisce. Production was handled by Young Jonn and Olamide while B. Banks mixed and mastered the album. Lagos Nawa serves as a follow-up to The Glory (2016).

== Background ==
Olamide revealed the artwork and tracklist of the album on 6 November 2017. According to Guardian Life Magazine, Olamide finished the album in two days.

== Singles ==
The album's only single "Wo" was released on 7 August 2017. It was produced by Young Jonn.

== Reception ==
Jonathan "Joey" Akan of Pulse Nigeria noted that Lagos Nawa showcased Olamide's focus on his home city with themes of "love, hustle and celebration" while delivering an enjoyable experience, though it wasn't his most cohesive work, giving it a rating of 3/5. Toye Sokunbi of YNaija saw Lagos Nawa as a typical Olamide album filled with party tracks and fillers, lacking a central narrative or artistic growth, adding that Olamide's approach "shows no clear sign that the rapper is concerned about mapping growth."

Osareme Edeoghon of Music in Africa observed that Lagos Nawa was Olamide's way of appeasing his street audience after focusing on rap, with most tracks being "banal, pedestrian, and embarrassing," yet ultimately serving as "compensation to the streets for neglecting them." NotJustOk ranked Lagos Nawa #10 on their list of "Olamide's Best Albums."

== Track listing ==
All tracks produced by Young Jonn, except where noted.

Lagos Nawa track listing
No.	Title	Writer(s)	Producer(s)	Length
1.	"Fe Nu Shey Street"	Olamide Adedeji		2:55
2.	"Radio Lagos"	Adedeji		3:00
3.	"Yagaga"	Adedeji		3:39
4.	"The One"	Adedeji		3:33
5.	"Oro Paw Paw"	Adedeji		5:13
6.	"Bend it Over" (featuring Reminisce and Timaya)	Adedeji; Remilekun Safaru; Inetimi Odom		4:20
7.	"Shine"	Adedeji	Olamide	2:38
8.	"Saysaymaley"	Adedeji		3:23
9.	"Mo Je Dodo"	Adedeji		3:26
10.	"Lagos Nawa"	Adedeji		3:02
11.	"Everyday is Not Christmas"	Adedeji		3:51
12.	"On a Must Buzz" (featuring Phyno)	Adedeji; Chibuzor Azubuike		3:50
13.	"Shanko Baby"	Adedeji		3:18
14.	"Fine Fine Girls" (featuring Tiwa Savage)	Adedeji; Tiwatope Savage		3:39
15.	"Wo"	Adedeji		3:15
16.	"Enimimomi"	Adedeji		3:25
17.	"Wo Spiritual"	Adedeji		2:32
Total length:				59:04

== Personnel ==
- Olamide Adedeji – vocals, writing, production
- Inetimi Odom – vocals, writing
- Remilekun Safaru – vocals, writing
- Tiwatope Savage - vocals, writing
- Chibuzor Azubuike – vocals, writing
- Young Jonn - production
- B.Banks - mixing, mastering

== Charts ==
=== Weekly charts ===
Chart performance for Lagos Nawa
Chart (2017)	Peak position
US World Albums (Billboard)	6

== Release history ==
Release history and formats for Lagos Nawa
Region	Date	Format	Label
Various	17 November 2017	CD; digital download	YBNL Nation
