= DJ Shawn =

Nigerian DJ and producer

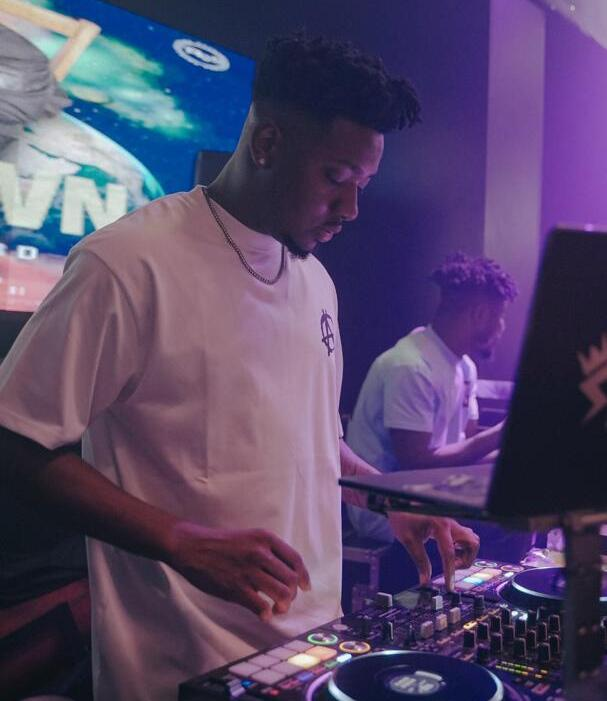

Background information
- Born: Oresile Oluwaseun Joshua; June 22, 1998 (age 28); Ogun State, Nigeria
- Origin: Ogun State, Nigeria
- Genres: Afrobeats, Amapiano, Afrohouse, Dancehall, Hiphop, EDM
- Occupations: Disc jockey; Record Producer; singer; songwriter
- Years active: 2018–present

Oresile Oluwaseun Joshua (born 22 June 1998), professionally known as DJ Shawn (stylized as DeeJay Shawn), is a Nigerian disc jockey, record producer, and songwriter. He is known for his breakthrough single 'O Pari' featuring Timaya and Falz which debuted on official TurnTable Nigeria Top 100 chart at 95 and Cool FM Nigeria official top songs.

== Early life and education ==
Oluwaseun was born and brought up Festac Extension Mile 2 in Lagos State. He obtained a degree in physics from the University of Lagos. Oluwaseun musical journey began at the age of 10, from going to his elder brother's studio in the early 2000s to help handle recording sessions with artists in his absence.

== Career ==
DJ Shawn started DJing around Mile 2 in 2012. By 2013, he began working professionally while also interning at City FM 105 for about two years. He got a gig with City FM 105 show known as HipHop ride with K which he did for four years.

Between 2014 and 2018, he played regularly at Bheerhugz in Ikeja City Mall and Surulere. In 2019, he became the resident DJ at W Bar in Ikoyi

In 2019, he got an offer from Silverbird Communications, to be the DJ of its radio station, Rhythm 93.7 FM Lagos. In October 2023 he produced Niniola single titled 'Komiyo'

On 4 June 2021 he released his first single 'O Pari' featuring Timaya and Falz, which debuted on official TurnTable Nigeria Top 100 chart at 95 and Cool FM Nigeria official top songs.

On 28 September 2023 he released his debut EP titled Awesome, The EP features guest appearances from Blaqbonez, Pheelz, Bella Shmurda, Magixx, Niniola, LAX, Reekado Banks, KiDi which received positive critical reviews.

In February 2025, DJ Shawn emerges as champion of Red Bull Spin it loud at Vertigo Lagos

== Notable performances ==
Event	Year
"MTVBase Africa DJ Takeover"	2020
"Big Brother Naija season 6"	2021
"Big Brother Naija season 9"	2024
"The Ebro Show on Apple Music"	2024

== Discography ==
=== EP ===
- Awesome EP (2023)

=== Singles ===
- "O Pari" feat. Timaya and Falz (2021)
- "Baddest" (with LAX and Reekado Banks) (2022)
- "Lifestyle" (with Pheelz) feat. Magnito (2024)

=== Mixtapes ===
Mixtape's	Year
"Afrobeats Mixtape"	2021
"Amapiano Mixtape"	2022
"Life of a Party Mix"	2022
"Best of Davido Summer '22	2022
"Best of Burna Boy Summer '22	2022
"Amapiano Lifestyle Vol 1	2023
"Afrobeats Summer 2023 (DJ Mix)"	2023
"World Happiness (DJ Mix)"	2023
"Afrobeats Summer (DJ Mix)"	2024

== See also ==
- List of Nigerian DJs
