= Who You Epp? =

Single by Olamide featuring Wande Coal and Phyno
- Released: 2 April 2016 (original); 26 April 2016 (Wande Coal and Phyno remix)
- Recorded: 2016
- Genre: Afrobeats; hip-hop
- Length: 3:40
- Label: YBNL Nation
- Songwriter: Olamide Adedeji
- Producer: Shizzi

Olamide singles chronology
"Garawa" (2016)	"Who You Epp?" (2016)	"Fada Fada" (2016)

Wande Coal singles chronology
"Same Shit" (2015)	"Who You Epp?" (2016)	"Found Da Boi" (2016)

Phyno singles chronology
"Say No More" (2016)	"Who You Epp?" (2016)	"Show Love" (2016)

Music video
- "Who You Epp?" on YouTube

"Who You Epp?" is a song by Nigerian rapper Olamide. The Shizzi-produced track was originally performed alone, released on 2 April 2016 as a freestyle. The song grew through an open-verse challenge, where Olamide left 16 bars open for artists to record their own parts. Many artists took part, both mainstream and underground. Chinko Ekun, Ruggedman, Ayo Jay, Reminisce, and Mz Kiss, among other acts, participated in the challenge. Phyno added a verse the day after the song's release, and a version featuring Wande Coal surfaced online on 26 April 2016. Olamide later released the official remix featuring both artists on 31 May 2016, accompanied by a music video directed by Sesan. Olamide won the Best Street-Hop Artiste award for the song at the 2016 edition of the Headies, as well as Song of the Year at the 2016 Soundcity MVP Awards.

== Background ==
Olamide met Nigerian record producer Shizzi while on his United States tour in Atlanta, and they collaborated on a freestyle titled "Who You Epp?". The track was intended as a light, informal freestyle with no specific meaning, although "who you epp", means "who have you helped?", and is a variation of "who you don epp", a phrase in Nigerian Pidgin used sarcastically to show the irrelevance of the subject. Olamide left 16 bars open at the end of the song, encouraging other artists and fans to add their own verses, which contributed to the song's popularity as an open-verse challenge. According to OkayAfrica, Shizzi created the beat in 15 minutes.

== Remix ==
A few hours after the release of "Who You Epp?", fellow Nigerian rapper Phyno released his version of the song. Later, on 26 April 2016, a version with Wande Coal surfaced online. The music video for "Who You Epp? (Refix)" was directed by Sesan.

== #WhoYouEpp challenge ==
On 6 April 2016, Olamide partnered with the music website NotJustOk to launch the Olamide #WhoYouEpp competition, aimed at supporting up-and-coming artists. The competition centered around the freestyle track "Who You Epp?", and participants were required to record their own freestyle over the 16-bar space left open by Olamide. Entrants could download the instrumental from the NotJustOk website and upload their recordings. The top ten entries, selected through public voting, advanced to the semi-final stage. The winner of the competition was promised a free collaboration with Olamide, a free instrumental (funded by Olamide), and a music video directed by Mr. Moe Musa. The submission deadline was 15 April 2016. Joey Akan of Pulse Nigeria saw the competition as an attempt for Olamide to recruit new YBNL Nation members, since the winners appeared on a label-credited release.

NotJustOk announced the top 20 semi-finalists on 26 April 2016: Drew, CEM, Seven, Tosin Robeck, M3dal, A.B.S, Mingul, Jay_Dee, Jesse Raey, UC Flamez, YokeeGilla, Scripts, Odibay, Seax Penz, Bobby D, Sequence, Trod, KizzyDrez, Maupheen, and Delis. By 18 May 2016, the top 10 finalists were selected: Jay_Dee, Delis, Maupheen, A.B.S, Trod, Scripts, Odibay, Drew, UC Flamez, and KizzyDrez. They competed in a live freestyle cypher in Lagos, with DJ Jimmy Jatt as the official DJ and coverage by NotjustOk TV. The competition was later narrowed to the top five: Trod, Delis, Maupheen, Drew, and Scripts. Maupheen and Delis were ultimately declared the winners and earned the opportunity to feature with Olamide on the song "Lies People Tell", along with a music video directed by Unlimited L.A.

== Accolades ==
Awards and nominations for "Who You Epp?"
Organization	Year	Category	Result	Ref.
The Headies	2016	Best Street-Hop Artiste (Olamide for "Who You Epp?")	Won	
Soundcity MVP Awards Festival	2016	Song of the Year	Won	
Soundcity MVP Awards Festival	2016	Best Collaboration	Nominated	
Soundcity MVP Awards Festival	2016	Listeners Choice	Nominated	
Nigeria Entertainment Awards	2017	Hottest Single of the Year	Won	

== Personnel ==
- Olamide Adedeji - vocals, writer
- Oluwaseyi Akerele - production

== Release history ==
Release history and formats for "Who You Epp?"
Region	Date	Format	Label	Version
Various	2 April 2016	Digital download	YBNL Nation	Original
Various	26 April 2016	Digital download	YBNL Nation	Phyno and Wande Coal remix
