= DJ Enimoney =

Nigerian disc jockey

- Born: Eniola Olamilekan Adedeji; Lagos State, Nigeria
- Origin: Ogun State, Nigeria
- Genres: Hip hop; Afrobeat; EDM
- Occupation: Disc jockey
- Years active: 2015–present
- Labels: YBNL Nation, Wobey Agency

Eniola Olamilekan Adedeji, known professionally as DJ Enimoney, is a Nigerian disc jockey. Enimoney is the official disc jockey of YBNL Nation and younger brother of Nigerian rapper, Olamide.

== Early life ==
DJ Enimoney was born in Lagos to Nigerian parents. He pursued a high school education at Lagos State Secondary School and studied Computer science at Lagos City Polytechnic.

== Career ==
DJ Enimoney started his professional disc jockey career after senior secondary school in 2015 at Bariga. He gained recognition in 2016 with his debut single "Oya dab" which featured Olamide.

At the 2018 edition of the City People Music Awards, held in Lagos, DJ Enimoney's single "Diet" which features Tiwa Savage & Slimcase won "Best Collaboration of the Year". That same year, he was nominated at the Nigerian Entertainment Award for "Diet" in the "Best Single by DJ" category.

== Discography ==
=== Singles ===
- "Gapa" (featuring CDQ (rapper), Chinko Ekun and B Banks) (2015)
- "Sweety gurl" (featuring Small Doctor and Dresan) (2016)
- "Spending cash" (featuring 2Sec]) (2016)
- "People Talk Alot (P.T.A)" (featuring Olamide and Pheelz) (2016)
- "Oya dab" (featuring Olamide) (2016)
- "Wapka Me" (2017)
- "Send Her Money"(featuring Olamide, Kizz Daniel, LK Kuddy and Kranium) (2018)
- "Diet" (featuring Tiwa Savage, Reminisce and Slimcase) (2018)
- "Ogede" (featuring Reekado Banks) (2019)
- "Sugar Daddy" (featuring Olamide) (2021)

=== Awards and nominations ===
Year	Category	Award	Result
2018	City People Music Award	Best Collaboration of the Year (Diet)	Won
2018	City People Music Award	Popular Song of the Year (Diet)	Nominated
2018	City People Music Award	DJ of the Year	Nominated
2018	Nigerian Entertainment Awards	Best single by DJ	Nominated

== See also ==
- List of Nigerian DJs
