= Eyan Mayweather =

Studio album by Olamide
- Released: November 23, 2015
- Recorded: 2014–2015
- Genre: Hip hop; afropop
- Length: 74:15
- Label: YBNL
- Producer: Olamide Adedeji (exec.); Pheelz; B Banks; I.D. Cabasa; Young Jonn

Olamide chronology
2 Kings (2015)	Eyan Mayweather (2015)	The Glory (2016)

Singles from Eyan Mayweather
- 1. "Bobo" Released: 2 May 2015; 2. "Melo Melo" Released: 1 June 2015; 3. "Lagos Boys" Released: 14 August 2015; 4. "Matters Arising" Released: 18 September 2015

Eyan Mayweather is the fifth studio album by Nigerian rapper Olamide, released on 23 November 2015. Released through YBNL Nation with studio production from Pheelz, Young Jonn, B Banks and I.D. Cabasa, Eyan Mayweather serves as the follow-up to 2 Kings, a collaborative album by Olamide and Phyno.

== Background ==
Eyan Mayweather was announced on 16 November 2015, and was released on 23 November 2015 as Olamide's fifth studio album in five consecutive years, a move that Ovie of NotJustOk described as a “ridiculous level of consistency”. The album was preceded by four singles, which consisted of "Bobo", "Matters Arising", "Lagos Boys" and "Melo Melo".

== Singles ==
The album's lead single "Bobo" was released on 2 May 2015. It was produced by Young John. Olamide won Best Street-Hop Artiste for "Bobo" at the Headies 2015 and it was nominated for Best Pop Single and Song of the Year. Young John was nominated for Producer of the Year for "Bobo". The second single, "Melo Melo" was released on 1 June 2015. It is mostly spoken in Yoruba and is a ballad produced by Pheelz. The third single off Eyan Mayweather was released on 14 August 2015, entitled "Lagos Boys". It was produced by Pheelz. The fourth and final single, "Matters Arising", was released on 18 September 2015. "Matters Arising" was produced by Pheelz.

== Critical reception ==
Ayomide Tayo's review of Eyan Mayweather for Pulse Nigeria highlighted the rapper's struggle to evolve beyond his typical hustle-centric themes, resulting in a lackluster album. While Olamide's previous successes and influence on Nigerian rap were acknowledged, Tayo noted that Eyan Mayweather fails to deliver a memorable or fresh experience, with repetitive topics and uninspired production. He concluded that Olamide's fifth album "falls short of a classic," giving it a rating of 2.5/5 (Average).

Wilfred Okiche of 360nobs reviewed Olamide's Eyan Mayweather as an album that showcases his versatility, blending pop, highlife, and street anthems with energy and charisma. Okiche concluded, "It is still really Olamide’s world and we are all just living in it."

== Track listing ==
All tracks written by Olamide Adedeji.
No.	Title	Producer(s)	Length
1.	"Eyan Mayweather"	Pheelz	3:36
2.	"Inferiority Complex"	Pheelz	4:02
3.	"Don't Stop"	Pheelz	3:14
4.	"Where The Man?"	B Banks	3:36
5.	"Igara Chicken"	B Banks	3:21
6.	"Boom Boom Boom"	Pheelz	2:57
7.	"Ball"	B Banks	2:48
8.	"Akara"	Pheelz	3:57
9.	"Say Something"	Pheelz	3:07
10.	"Be Happy"	Pheelz	3:28
11.	"Kana Finish"	Pheelz	3:24
12.	"I'm Ok"	Pheelz	3:43
13.	"Matters Arising"	Pheelz	4:17
14.	"Lagos Boys"	Pheelz	3:47
15.	"Mama Mi"	Pheelz	3:14
16.	"Melo Melo"	Pheelz	3:41
17.	"Sold Out"	I.D. Cabasa	4:12
18.	"Bobo"	Young Jonn	4:38
19.	"Toriomo"	Pheelz	3:38
20.	"Jega"	Pheelz	3:07
21.	"OG Waheedee"	Pheelz	3:21
Total length:			74:15

== Release history ==
Release history and formats for Eyan Mayweather
Region	Date	Format	Label
Various	23 November 2015	CD; digital download	YBNL Nation
