= Bella Alubo =

Nigerian musician and songwriter (born 1993)

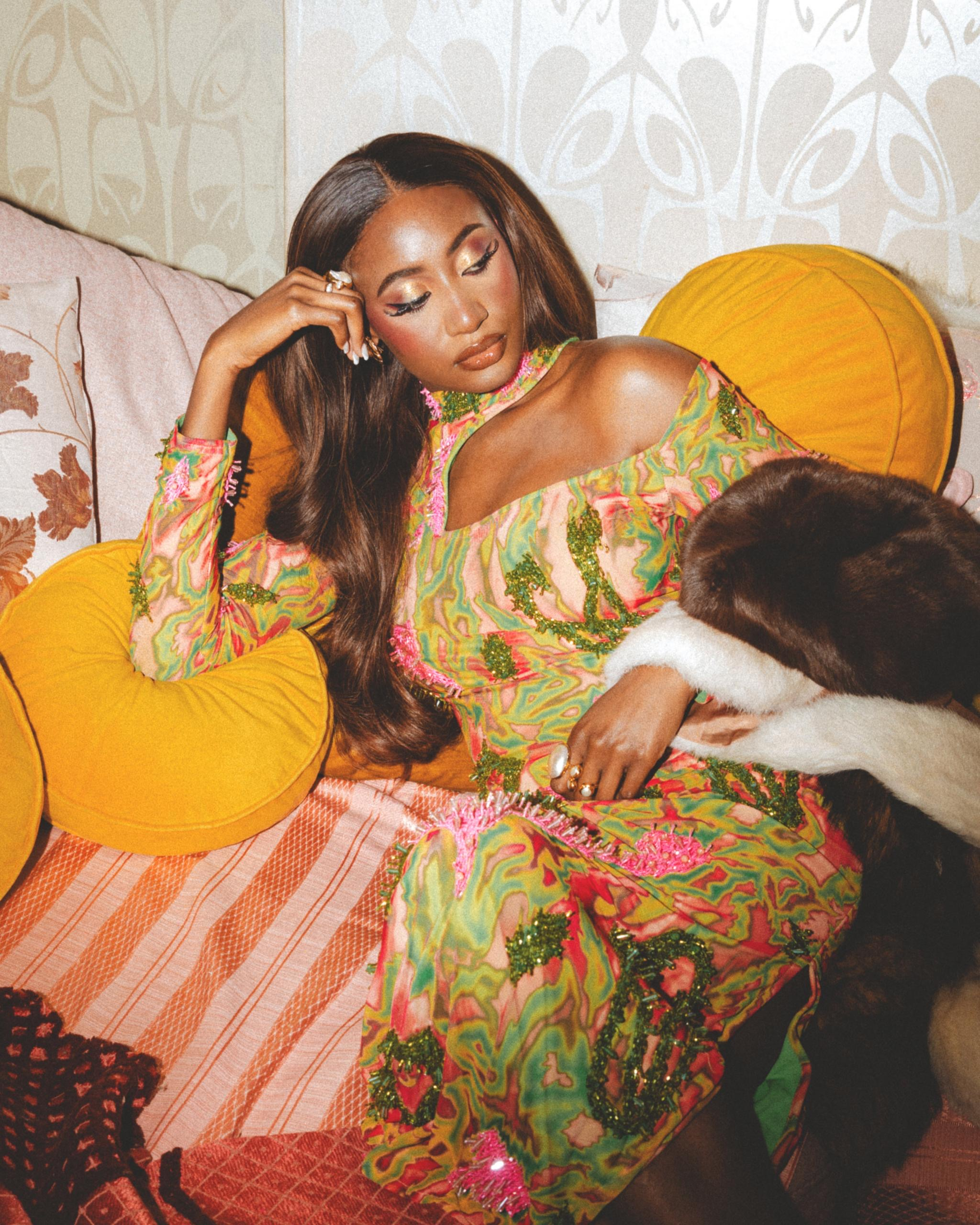
- Alubo in 2018

Background information
- Born: Mabel Oine Alubo; 9 August 1993 (age 33); Jos, Nigeria
- Genres: Afropop; R&B; reggae
- Occupations: Singer, songwriter, performer, actress
- Years active: 2017–present

Bella Alubo (born Mabel Oine Alubo, 9 August 1993) is a Nigerian musician, alternative R&B, hip-hop singer and songwriter, Known for her collaborative EP, "Late Night Vibrations" with Ycee. She's signed to Benin City Entertainment.

== Early life ==
Alubo was born and raised in Jos, Nigeria. She often wrote poems as a child.

Growing up, Bella was influenced by the music of 2Baba, one of the most successful artists from his tribe. She recalls hearing 2Baba’s “African Queen” at a young age and understanding its clear depiction of love and admiration, despite his age. This early exposure to Nigerian classics inspired his creative outlook. Years later, he wrote “African King” as a personal manifestation of his ideal version of love. Blending R&B with a subtle trap rhythm, the song’s modern sound led his label to include it on his debut album.

== Career ==
In 2018, Alubo dropped a collaborative EP, Late Night Vibrations with Ycee, and a follow-up EP, Re-Bella, featuring BOJ, Victoria Kimani, Efya, and Sho Madjozi. In 2019, she dropped Summer's Over EP featuring Mr Eazi, and many more. She dropped singles with Fasina and Lady Donli. In August 2019, she dropped "Agbani"'s remix, featuring Zlatan Ibile. She was nominated for the promising act to watch at the 2018 Nigeria Entertainment Awards and listed among 2018 promising artists. She has up to 20 million streams across various platforms. Bella eventually left Tinny Entertainment in September 2018.

In 2021, Alubo released her debut studio album titled Bella Buffet and re-released her official single Location featuring Niniola in May 2022, under Benin City Entertainment.

In 2022, Alubo signed to Benin City Entertainment label founded by Nigerian-American, Elliot Osagie.

In 2022, Bella was featured in a single by The Notorious B.I.G titled G.O.A.T. alongside Ty Dolla $ign and produced by Kayo and Elliot Osagìe. The song contains Biggie's vocals from the Life After Death hit "I Love The Dough", with Jay-Z and Angela Winbush, in which he spoke about his incredible lifestyle.

On 29 May 2022, Bella was enlisted by Red Hot Org, a major HIV/AIDS organization, for a new project called Kele-le alongside Lady Donli, Tomi Owo, Mz Kiss, and Oshun . The four-track EP, which translates to girlfriend in pidgin and unignorable sound in Swahili, not only shows the artists' talents but also brings them together for a similar objective. In 2025, she released her sophomore album titled "Love Is War"

== Discography ==
=== Albums/EPs ===
- Late Night Vibrations (2018)
- Re-Bella (2018)
- Summer's Over (2019)
- Bella Buffet(2021)
- Run it Back (2025)
- Love Is War (2025)

=== Selected singles ===
Here is the list of Bella Alubo's singles.

- "Radio"
- "Agbani"
- "Gimme Love"

=== As featured ===
- G.O.A.T (The Notorious B.I.G featuring Ty Dolla $ign and Bella Alubo)

== Award and nominations ==
Alubo has received some accolades and nominations which include Nigeria Entertainment Awards for 2018 Most Promising Act to Watch.
