= James Chike Nwankwo =

Nigerian disc jockey

DJ Virall
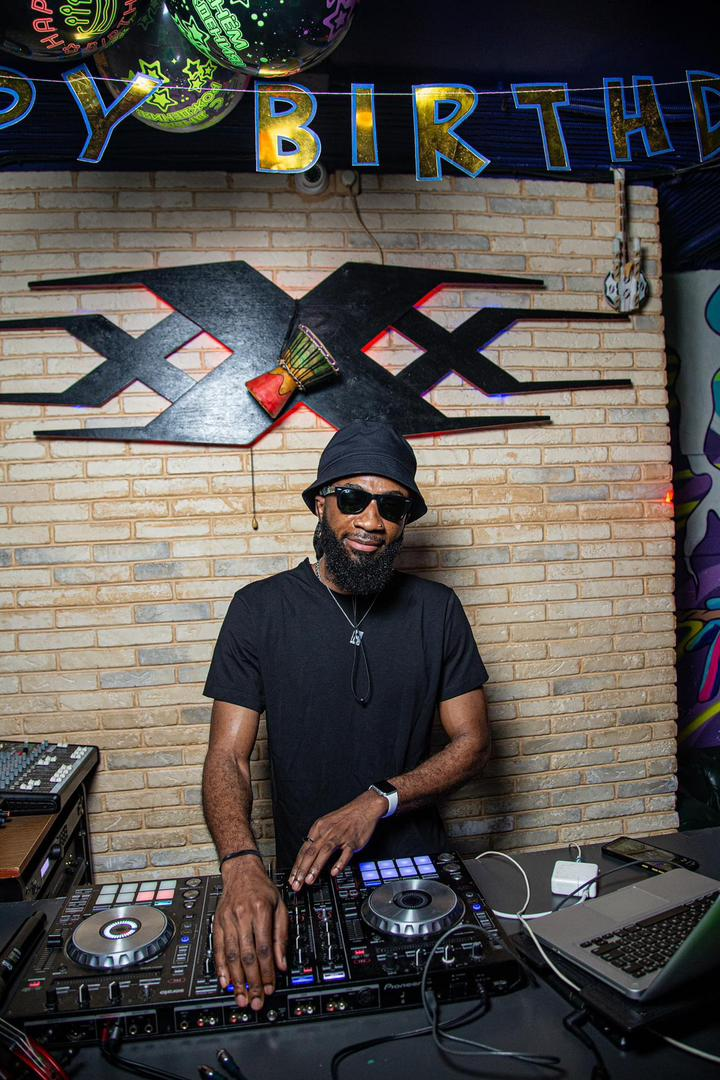

Background information
- Born: James Chike Nwankwo; June 24, 1989 (age 36); Kaduna State, Nigeria
- Origin: Orumba North, Anambra State, Nigeria
- Genres: AfroPop, Hip hop
- Occupation: Disc jockey
- Years active: 2001–present

James Chike Nwankwo (better known as DJ Virall) is a pioneering disc jockey (DJ), master of ceremonies (MC), record producer, songwriter, and remixer.

He played a role in popularizing the genre of Hip hop music as therapy, the concept of DJ residencies in Moscow, and techniques such as phasing, backspinning, punch phrasing, and breakbeat (a rhythmic section of a song that DJs would loop).

James is among the pioneers of the Afro igbo genre in Nigeria. He has been nominated twice at the Nigeria Entertainment Awards, and won the Nigerian Books of Record in 2021.

== Early life and education ==
James Nwankwo (born June 24, 1989) hails from Orumba North LGA in Anambra State, Nigeria. He was born in Kaduna and raised in Ibadan, and completed his primary school education at Hallelujah Model School (2001). He proceeded to Command Secondary Schools, Adekunle Fajuyi Cantonment, Ibadan, Oyo State, Nigeria in 2007. Afterwards, he attended the University of Ibadan, Oyo state, where he graduated with a combined bachelor's degree (hons) in Communication and Language Arts and English Language (2014). He later obtained a master's degree (cum laude) in Foreign Languages and Intercultural Communication from HSE University (2022).

== Career ==
Nwankwo developed a strong passion for music from a young age, particularly Electronic dance music (EDM) and hip hop.

DJ Virall made history as the first Nigerian DJ to perform at the University of Glasgow. He is noted as one of the best Mobile DJs in the southeastern part of Nigeria.

In 2013, he pioneered the sounds of Nigerian Afro fusion pop, with his artistry appealing to lovers of all styles of dance music. In 2015, he emerged as one of Nigeria's leading DJs at the Coke Studio season 8 project.

He is also the first Afro DJ to play at the Bookhouse club revolutionary party in honour of Elizabeth Wurtzel and was listed among Yessiey Africa 100 Most Influential People in 2023.

== Journals ==
Nwankwo has articles published in journals including: Sage's Bulletin of Science and Technology (Analysis of Impact of Industry 4.0 on Africa, Eastern Europe and US: A Case Study of Cyber-Security and Sociopolitical Dynamics of Nigeria, Russia and USA).

== Awards and recognition ==
Nwankwo's impact in growing the entertainment industry earned him two nominations at the Nigeria Entertainment Awards and an award by Nigerian Books of Record in 2021. He is also a member of the ForbesBLK community.

== See also ==
- List of Nigerian DJs
