= 10th Headies Awards =

Nigerian music industry awards

The Headies 2015
- Official poster
- Date: 1 January 2016
- Location: Landmark Events Centre; Victoria Island, Lagos State
- Country: Nigeria
- Hosted by: Kaffy; Bovi
- Most awards: Olamide (4)
- Most nominations: Wizkid (7)
- Website: theheadies.com

Television/radio coverage
- Network: HipTV

The Headies 2015 was the 10th edition of The Headies. It was held on 1 January 2016, at the Landmark Events Centre in Victoria Island, Lagos. Themed "Flip the Script", the event was hosted by Bovi and Kaffy. It was previously scheduled to hold on 30 December 2015, but the organizers of the event postponed it to 1 January 2016, without citing any reason. Olamide won a total of four awards, while Timi Dakolo won three. Wizkid was nominated seven times across the twenty-one award categories. 2face Idibia was honored with the Hall of Fame award, while Don Jazzy received the Special Recognition award. Reekado Banks won the Next Rated award. His win was criticized by music critics, who challenged the "fairness of the award process".

== Performers ==
- Majek Fashek
- Timi Dakolo
- Olamide
- Falz
- Adekunle Gold
- Simi
- Harrysong
- Seyi Shay
- Victoria Kimani
- Eva Alordiah
- Vector
- Iyanya

== Winners and nominees ==
Below is the list of nominees and winners for the popular music categories. Winners are highlighted in bold.

Best R&B/Pop Album	Best Rap Album
**Ayo – Wizkid**; King of Queens – Yemi Alade; Bed of Stone – Aṣa; Double Trouble – P-Square; Rich & Famous – Praiz	**The Chairman – M.I**; Baba Hafusa – Reminisce; Above Ground Level – Mode 9; Street OT – Olamide
Best R&B Single	Best Pop Single
**"Wish Me Well" – Timi Dakolo**; "Do The Right Thing" – Cobhams Asuquo (featuring Bez); "Heartbeat" – Praiz; "Say You Love Me" – Leriq (featuring Wizkid); "Baby Daddy" – Iyanya	**"Godwin" – Korede Bello**; "Collabo" – P-Square (featuring Don Jazzy); "Bobo" – Olamide; "My Woman, My Everything" – Patoranking (featuring Wande Coal); "Woju" – Kiss Daniel; "Ojuelegba" – Wizkid
Best Vocal Performance (Male)	Best Vocal Performance (Female)
**"Wish Me Well" – Timi Dakolo**; Bez – "There's a Fire"; Cobhams Asuquo – "Do The Right Thing"; Shaydee – "High"; Praiz – "If I Fall"	**"Iwo Nikan" – Aramide**; Waje – "Coco Baby"; Simi – "Tiff"; Yemi Alade – "Duro Timi"; Aṣa – "Bed of Stone"
Best Rap Single	Best Street-Hop Artiste
**"King Kong" – Vector**; "Bank Alert" – Illbliss; "Bad Belle" – M.I; "Local Rappers" – Reminisce (featuring Olamide & Phyno); "T.R" – G.O.D	**Olamide – "Bobo"**; Small Doctor – "Mosquito Killer"; Reminisce- "Skillashi"; Masterkraft (featuring Olamide, CDQ & Davido) – "Indomie" (Remix); Falz (featuring Poe & Yemi Alade) – "Marry Me"
Best Collabo	Lyricist on the Roll
**"Local Rappers" – Reminisce (featuring Olamide & Phyno)**; "Bad Girl Special (Remix)" – Mr 2Kay (featuring Cynthia Morgan & Seyi Shay); "Do The Right Thing" – Cobhams Asuquo (featuring Bez); "Hold On" – Joe El (featuring 2face Idibia); "Sisi" – Praiz (featuring Wizkid); "Shoki (Remix)" – Lil Kesh (featuring Olamide & Davido)	**Vector – "King Kong"**; Illbliss (featuring Ice Prince, Eva Alordiah, Phyno) – "Bank Alert"; G.O.D – "T.R"; Reminisce – "Baba Hafusa"
Song of the Year	Best Recording of the Year
**"Ojuelegba" – Wizkid**; "Godwin" – Korede Bello; "Bobo" – Olamide; "Woju" – Kiss Daniel	**"Wish Me Well" – Timi Dakolo**; "There's a Fire" – Bez; "Eyo" – Aṣa; "Ojuelegba" – Wizkid; "Do The Right Thing" – Cobhams Asuquo
Album of the Year	Artiste of the Year
**Street OT – Olamide**; Ayo – Wizkid; The Chairman – M.I; Double Trouble – P-Square; Rich & Famous – Praiz; King of Queens – Yemi Alade	**Olamide**; Davido; P-Square; Wizkid; Yemi Alade
Producer of the Year	Best Music Video (Note: This particular accolade is awarded to the video director.)
**Legendury Beatz – "Ojuelegba"**; Don Jazzy – "Godwin"; Cobhams Asuquo – "There's A Fire"; Masterkraft – "Wiser"; Shizzi – "Fans Mi"; Young John – "Bobo"	**"Katapot" – Unlimited L.A**; "Baby Jollof" – Clarence Peters; "Crazy" – Meji Alabi; "Jamb Question" – Mex; "The Sound" – Sesan Ogunro
Next Rated	African Artiste of the Year
**Reekado Banks**; Cynthia Morgan; Lil Kesh; Kiss Daniel; Korede Bello	(Ghana) **Sarkodie**; (South Africa) Cassper Nyovest; (South Africa) AKA; (Tanzania) Diamond Platnumz; (South Africa) Uhuru
Rookie of the Year	Best Reggae/Dancehall Single
**Ycee**; Base One; Humblesmith; Koker; Pepenazi; Young Grey C	**"German Juice" – Cynthia Morgan**; "Daniella Whyne" – Patoranking; "Sanko" – Timaya; "My Body" – Solid Star (featuring Timaya); "Bad Girl Special (Remix)" – Mr 2Kay (featuring Cynthia Morgan & Seyi Shay)
Best Alternative Song	Special Recognition Award
**"Sade" – Adekunle Gold**; "Satan Be Gone" – Aṣa; "Awwww" – Di'Ja; "There's A Fire" – Bez; "Rain on Me" – Ugovinna; "Tiff" – Simi	**Don Jazzy**
Hip Hop World Revelation of the Year	Hall of Fame
**Yemi Alade**; Praiz; Skales	**2Face Idibia**
