= List of Nigerian DJs =

== List of Nigerian DJs ==
- DJ Abass
- DJ Bally
- DJ Big N
- DJ Caise
- DJ Shawn
- DJ Cuppy
- DJ Enimoney
- DJ KayWise
- DJ Exclusive
- DJ Jimmy Jatt
- DJ Neptune
- DJ Spinall
- DJ Tunez
- DJ Big N
- DJ Switch (Nigerian DJ)
- Masterkraft (producer)
- DJ Virall
