= 2015 Nigerian Teens Choice Awards =

4th NTC Awards
- Date: August 9, 2015
- Location: Congress Hall, Transcorp Hilton Abuja
- Hosted by: Funke Akindele; Denrele Edun

Television/radio coverage
- Network: Silverbird Television; Planet TV; AIT
- Produced by: Nelson E Williams Promotion

The 4th Nigerian Teens Choice Awards was held at Transcorp Hilton in Abuja on August 9, 2015. The live show host were Funke Akindele, and Denrele Edun. Its forth ceremony also featured live performances from Davido, Praiz, Seyi Shay, and Lil Kesh.

== Performers ==
=== Artist ===
- Davido
- Praiz
- Seyi Shay
- Lil Kesh

=== Presenters ===
- Funke Akindele
- Denrele Edun

== Nominations and winners ==
The following is a list of nominees and the winners:

| Choice Male Artist | Choice Female Artist |
|---|---|
| Tay Iwar; Skiibii; Tochukwu Anukam; Rodnee Okafor; Oluwa Snipssy; LK KUDDY | Efe Oraka; Mimi Ghoy; Lady Donli; Joel; Princess Okoh; Adaeze Ebeku |
| Choice Hip Hop Artist | Choice Instrumentalist |
| Rodnee Okafor; Kuddi Is Dead; Emma Nini; Yung Slim; Gedda Gedda; Nelson Phero | Micheal Ari; Nabil Shuaib; Ezekiel Oyemomi; Walid Umaru; Onyekwelu Courage |
| Choice Producer | Choice Collaboration |
| Speroach Beatz; Danny Joe Beatz; Tay Iwar; Nitty Memories; Gedda Gedda; David Onuoha | Laime, Kizz Ernie - ""; Skiibii, Kcee - "Stay with Me"; Dannykull, Tochukwu Anukam, Yunusir Abdullahi - "Hangover"; Zilla Oaks, Tay Iwar - "Ghost"; Nicholas Kuddi, Vika Williams - ""; Vocal Madness Inc. - "" |
| Choice Outstanding Vocalist (Male) | Choice Outstanding Vocalist (Female) |
| Fahad Umaru; Tafari Halilu | Naomi Kamofou Watti; Grace Otisi; Princess Okoh |
| Most Artistic Personality | Choice DJ (Male) |
| Phoebe Kyanchat; Feyisetan Fofah; Buikpo Adah - Meethof; Adaugo Lewis; Shirley Ekawu; Emediong Uko Emily | DJ Holoskii; DJ Lakeside; Somto Unamaba; DJ Hype Malgwi; Wilson AJayi; Precious Monokpo |
| Choice song of the year | Choice Mixtape/EP |
| Bolanle (feat. Skales) - Evamic; Hangover – Yunusir; Egwu Jigida – Jayy Archie; Zion Wolf – Tay Iwar; Ghost – Zilla; Virus (feat. Burna Boy) – Snipssy | More than a mixtape -Yung Wills; Passport – Tay Iwar; D.V.O.T.S – Gedda; W.A.T.T.E – Gramso; Love or War – Lady Donli |
| Choice Afrobeat/Pop Artiste | Choice Upcoming artiste |
| LK Kuddy; Jayy Archie; Stona; Famous Bobson; Seun Shiz; Skiibii | Yunusir Abdullahi; Kid Tee Kay; Laime; Isa Jibril; Young Bail; Micheal Giwa Amu |
| Choice Male Model | Choice Female Model |
| Kelvin Raymond; Emmanuel Olowojoba; Tochukwu Okafor; Sochima Arinze; Abayomi Alvin; Victor Baba | Debby Tega; Bukola Killer; Neno Wada; Princess Okoje; Sheila Najomo; Emily Khani |
| Choice Male Fashion Designer | Choice Female Fashion Designer |
| Tolu Peters; Matthew Unongo; Ifeanyi Nwune; Joshua Tarfa; Bobby- Bad Clothing | Urbane by Sommy; Ruth Ernest; Nana Hawakulu Araheem; Faith Ibrahim; Onanma Okeke; Aisha Garba Sulieman |
| Choice Most Fashionable Male | Choice Most Fashionable Female |
| Kamsy Nnabue; Matthew Unongo; Vika Williams; Josiah Neliaku; Bari Adenekan; Justin Ugonna | Annabel Giwa Amu; Neno Wada; Sayo Olagungu; Rukky Eovi; Amaka Charles; Amaka Ikpeazu |
| Choice Makeup Artiste | Choice Stylist |
| Vivian Okezie; Tiara Wada; Somto Adinde; Annabel Giwa Amu; Yinka Ayodele; Julliet Okechukwu | Obinna Obitaris Event/Consult; Somto Unamba; Chidinma Obi; Tolu Peters; Ruth Ernest; Claudia Kyase |

== Special Recognition Awards ==
| Award description(s) | Recipient |
Main show
| Choice Male Artist | "Davido" |
| Choice Female Artist | "Seyi Shay" |
| Song of the year | "Shoki" Lil Kesh |
| Outstanding TV Personality | "Alexx Ekubo |
| Top Featured Artist | "Davido" |
