= Nigerian Teens Choice Awards =

Nigerian entertainment awards

- Current: 2018 Nigerian Teens Choice Awards
- Awarded for: Teen excellence in Nigeria
- Sponsored by: Zenith Bank, Redance Africa, Seplat Petroleum Development Company, NTA, Pepsi Nigeria, Silverbird Entertainment, Planet TV, DAAR Communications
- Country: Nigeria
- Presented by: Nelson Ese Williams
- First award: August 2012
- Website: Official website

Television/radio coverage
- Network: Silverbird Television; Planet TV; AIT; NTA
- Produced by: Nelson E Williams Promotion
- Directed by: Nelson Ese Williams

Nigerian Teens Choice Awards (also known as The NTC Awards or NTCA honours), first introduced, and launched in August 2012 by Nelson Ese Williams, for teen excellence and awards personalities who influence the teen world in Nigeria. The NTC Awards, consisting of music, entertainment, media, fashion, sport, art, social achievement, individual personalities in film, and social media in Nigeria.

== History ==
The event is composed of 50 categories, and the 1st edition of the Nigerian Teens Choice Awards was held in 2012, and winners of the ceremony include Burna Boy, Korede Bello, Sina Rambo, Denrele Edun, Dammy Krane, and Wande Coal among others. At the 4th edition of the award, NTCA honours 52 Teens, including Tay Iwar, Efe Orake, and Speroach Beatz among others. At the 6th edition of the ceremony, Nelson Ese Williams introduced 6 new categories. On 24 July 2016, while speaking at a briefing in Abuja Nelson, said the 2016 edition is likely to have about 60 categories of nominations.

== Ceremonies ==
#	Date	Venue	Host city	Host
1st	2012		Abuja	
2nd	2013		Abuja	
3rd	17 August 2014		Abuja	Denrele Edun
4th	9 August 2015	Congress Hall, Transcorp Hilton Abuja	Abuja	Funke Akindele; Denrele Edun
5th	7 August 2016	Abuja International Conference Centre	Abuja	Wofai Samuel; VJ Ehiz
6th	6 August 2017		Lagos	
7th	6 August 2018		Lagos	Tobi Bakre

== Award categories ==
The following are the present categories:

=== Music categories ===
- Choice Male Artist
- Choice Female Artist
- Choice Hip Hop Artist
- Choice Afro Beat & Pop Artist
- Choice New Song of the Year
- Choice Upcoming Artist
- Choice Producer
- Choice Male Vocalist
- Choice Female Vocalist
- Choice Song Collaboration
- Choice DJ
- Choice Most Promising Act (Male)
- Choice Most Promising Act (Female)

=== Media/Entertainment ===
- Choice Media Personality
- Choice Publicist
- Choice Online Blogger/Blog
- Choice Outstanding Male Photographer
- Choice Outstanding Female Photographer
- Choice Youtube Channel

=== Fashion/Style ===
- Choice Fashion Stylist
- Choice Fashion Designer
- Choice Fashion Blogger
- Choice Most Fashionable (Male)
- Choice Most Fashionable (Female)
- Choice Male Model
- Choice Female Model
- Choice Clothing Brand
- Choice Make Up Artist
- Choice Beauty Web-Star

=== Art/Theatre ===
- Choice Most Artistic Personality
- Choice Upcoming Actress
- Choice Male Dance Act
- Choice Female Dance Act
- Choice Dance Group
- Choice Most Talented Personality
- Choice Comic/Humor Personality
- Choice Compere/Host
- Choice Poet/Novel Icon of the Year
- Choice Visual and Graphic Designer
- Choice Most Creative Personality

=== Sport ===
- Choice Male Sport Personality
- Choice Female Sport Personality

=== Personality ===
- Choice Most Sociable Male Personality
- Choice Most Sociable Female Personality
- Choice Outstanding Male Personality
- Choice Outstanding Female Personality

=== Social Achievement ===
- Choice Male Entrepreneur of the Year
- Choice Female Entrepreneur of the Year
- Choice Most Influential Personality
- Choice Philanthropist of the Year
