= 2 Kings (album) =

Studio album by Olamide and Phyno
- Released: 1 April 2015
- Recorded: 2014–15
- Genres: Hip-hop; afrobeats
- Length: 37:28
- Labels: Penthauze Music; YBNL Nation
- Producers: Pheelz; Major Bangz; B.Banks; Young Jonn

Olamide chronology
Street OT (2014)	2 Kings (2015)	Eyan Mayweather (2015)

Phyno chronology
No Guts No Glory (2014)	2 Kings (2015)	The Playmaker (2016)

Singles from 2 Kings
- 1. "Une" Released: 5 February 2015; 2. "Confam Ni" Released: 8 March 2015

2 Kings is a collaborative studio album by Nigerian rappers Olamide and Phyno. It was released through Cloud 9 and the iTunes Store with little announcement on 1 April 2015, by Penthauze Music and YBNL Nation. The album features collaborations with producers and guest artists such as Wizkid, Lil Kesh, Storm Rex, Pheelz, Major Bangz, B.Banks and Young Jonn. Prior to recording the album, Olamide and Phyno frequently collaborated with each other on several songs, including "Ghost Mode" and "Dope Money". The album produced the singles "Une" and "Confam Ni".

== Background ==
Olamide first announced plans for a collaborative project with Phyno in January 2014. 2 Kings was initially scheduled for release in 2014, but was pushed back. While speaking to Yaw of Wazobia FM in October 2014, Olamide said the album was still being worked on.

== Singles ==
On 5 February 2015, Phyno's "Une" was released as the album's lead single. On 8 March 2015, Olamide released the second single, "Confam Ni", which features vocals by Wizkid and was produced by Young John. The song received mainly positive reviews from critics. Henry Igwe of 360nobs said the song opened as a "smooth African number" with a familiar, bass-heavy Afro-pop sound, praising its upbeat feel while noting limited originality and weak lyricism from Wizkid and Olamide's brief verse. He concluded that despite those flaws, the track carried "the unmistakable upbeat feel" that recalled the optimism of "Ara" by Brymo and "Amin" by Dammy Krane.

Authors for tooXclusive each gave their opinions on the track. Jim Donnett said the song was "a very decent collabo" despite sounding similar to DJ Xclusive's "Jeje", praising the chill groove, Wizkid's hook, Olamide's delivery, and Young John's balance, and he rated it 4/5, while Jimmy King felt the pairing delivered as expected, calling it a track that would "crawl its way into the heart of every good music lovers,” crediting the dance-ready beat and both artists’ performances, and rated it 4/5. Al Yhusuff noted that the collaboration defied expectations of "Omo to Shan", appreciated the laid-back sound and performances while calling it "nice though not perfect," and rated it 3.6/5.

== Critical reception ==
2 Kings received generally positive reviews from music critics. Writing for tooXclusive, Jim Donnett awarded the album 4 stars out of 5, characterizing it as "the battle axe, crafted and fashioned for the reawakening purpose". Donnett also commended Olamide and Phyno for "breaking the fetters and reigning supreme as kings." Ayomide Tayo of Pulse Nigeria granted the album 3.5 stars out of 5, describing it as a "project that had more promise and potential than impact". Tayo applauded both rappers for not taking the "let's play it safe" approach. An unnamed writer for Jaguda described the album as a "classic masterpiece" and commended its production and length.

In a less enthusiastic review for 360nobs, Wilfred Okiche described the album as a collaborative effort that failed to live up to the high expectations set by "Ghost Mode". Okiche also said the album lacked a cohesive theme, felt disjointed, and rarely delivered standout performances.

== Track listing ==
No.	Title	Writer(s)	Producer(s)	Length
1.	"Cypher"	Olamide Adedeji; Chibuzo Nelson	Pheelz; B.Banks	2:47
2.	"Koba Koba"	Adedeji; Nelson	Pheelz; Young Jonn	4:37
3.	"Nobody's Fault"	Adedeji; Nelson	Pheelz	3:57
4.	"Ladi" (featuring Lil Kesh)	Adedeji; Nelson; Keshinro Ololade	Young Jonn	3:42
5.	"God Be With Us"	Adedeji; Nelson	Major Bangz	3:10
6.	"Une" (performed by Phyno)	Nelson	Major Bangz	3:38
7.	"Real Nigga"	Adedeji; Nelson	Pheelz	3:26
8.	"Confam Ni" (performed by Olamide featuring Wizkid)	Adedeji; Ayodeji Balogun	Young Jonn	4:28
9.	"Carry Me Go" (featuring Storm Rex)	Adedeji; Nelson; Yvonne Ogbougu	Pheelz	3:46
10.	"For My City"	Adedeji; Nelson	Pheelz	3:52
Total length:				37:28

== Personnel ==
Credits adapted from the album's cover.

- Olamide Adedeji - Primary artist, writer
- Chibuzo Nelson - Primary artist, writer
- Ayodeji Balogun - Featured artist, writer
- Keshinro Ololade - Featured artist, writer
- Yvonne Ogbuogu - Featured artist, writer
- Pheelz - Producer
- Major Bangz - Producer
- B.Banks - Producer
- Young Jonn - Producer

== Release history ==
Region	Date	Version	Format	Label
Various	1 April 2015	Standard	CD; digital download	Penthauze Music; YBNL Nation
