= City FM (Lagos) =

Nigerian radio station

City FM 105.1 is an urban music radio station located in Lateef Jakande Road, Agidigbi, Ikeja, Lagos.
