= Street OT =

Studio album by Olamide
- Released: November 14, 2014
- Recorded: 2014
- Genres: Afrobeats; hip-hop; afropop
- Languages: English; Yoruba; Igbo
- Label: YBNL Nation
- Producers: Olamide (exec.); Pheelz; B-Banks; Young Jonn

Olamide chronology
| Baddest Guy Ever Liveth (2013) | Street OT (2014) | 2 Kings (2015) |

Singles from Street OT
- 1. "Story for the Gods" Released: 20 June 2014; 2. "Goons Mi" Released: 21 July 2014

Street OT is the fourth studio album by Nigerian rapper Olamide. It was released by YBNL Nation on November 14, 2014. The album is a follow-up to Baddest Guy Ever Liveth (2013). Preceded by the singles titled "Story for the Gods" and "Goons Mi", Street OT features guest appearances from Pasuma, Lil Kesh, Chinko Ekun, Phyno, Don Jazzy, and Reminisce. Its production was handled by Pheelz, B-Banks and Young Jonn. The ideology of the title of the album is to glorify and show his love for the "streets", a word with which Olamide is synanimous with. Hours after its release, the album peaked at the number one spot on iTunes World Albums Chart.

== Critical reception ==
Professional ratings
Review scores
| Source | Rating |
|---|---|
| BellaNaija | 3/5 stars |
| NotJustOk | 1.7/5 stars |
| Nigerian Entertainment Today | 3.5/5 stars |

The release of Street OT was met with mixed reactions from music critics. Dayo Showemimo of Nigerian Entertainment Today rated the album 3.5 out of 5, adding that “Olamide might not have come into the game with a visible business plan but he’s stayed true and loyal to his chosen genre, he’s loved by the street”. In a contrasting view, Tola Sarumi of NotJustOk rated the album a low 3.5 out of 10, stating that the album “is not a pleasant aural experience, it’s a project cobbled together from leftover tracks.” A review by Should You Bump This, posted by BellaNaija, rated the album 3 out of 5 and went further to make a verdict, stating: “Street OT is not a stellar Baddo solo project but it’s a nice YBNL showcase album”. Wilfred Okiche of 360nobs wrote that Street OT "isn't exactly a mainstream effort but one whose primary target lies in the streets where he comes from".

== Accolades ==
Street OT won Album of the Year and was nominated for Best Rap Album at The Headies 2015. It was also nominated for Album of the Year at the 2015 Nigeria Entertainment Awards.

| Year | Award ceremony | Prize | Result |
|---|---|---|---|
| 2015 | The Headies | Album of the Year | Won |
| 2015 | The Headies | Best Rap Album | Nominated |
| 2015 | Nigeria Entertainment Awards | Album of the Year | Nominated |

== Track listing ==
| No. | Title | Length |
|---|---|---|
| 1. | "Oga Nla" (featuring Pasuma & Lil Kesh) | 3:34 |
| 2. | "Zero Joy" | 3:28 |
| 3. | "Blood Money" | 3:04 |
| 4. | "Ya Wa" | 3:12 |
| 5. | "Hood Rap" | 3:29 |
| 6. | "The Real MVP" | 3:02 |
| 7. | "Up In The Club" (featuring Viktoh) | 3:27 |
| 8. | "Skelemba" (featuring Don Jazzy) | 3:04 |
| 9. | "Prayer For Client" | 4:09 |
| 10. | "Batifeori" | 3:31 |
| 11. | "Bang" (featuring Chinko Ekun & Lil Kesh) | 3:55 |
| 12. | "Goons Mi" | 3:27 |
| 13. | "1999" | 2:43 |
| 14. | "Falila Ketan" | 3:54 |
| 15. | "In My Circle" (featuring Phyno) | 3:17 |
| 16. | "Alaaru" | 2:34 |
| 17. | "100 To Million" (featuring Viktoh & Chinko Ekun) | 4:50 |
| 18. | "Story For The Gods" | 3:26 |
| 19. | "Hustle Loyalty Respect" (featuring Reminisce) | 3:28 |
| 20. | "Possible" (featuring B-Banks) | 4:24 |
| 21. | "Usain Bolt" (featuring Lil Kesh, Chuka, Chinko Ekun & Pepenazi) | 4:25 |
| 22. | "Eni Suun" | 3:50 |

== Personnel ==
- Pheelz - Production (tracks 1, 4, 5, 7, 8, 10, 11, 12, 13, 15, 16, 17, 19, 20, 21, 22)
- Young John - Production (tracks 3, 6, 9, 14, 18)
- B-Banks - Production (track 2)

== Release history ==
| Country/Digital platform | Date | Version | Format | Label |
|---|---|---|---|---|
| iTunes; Nigeria | November 14, 2014 | Standard | CD; digital download | YBNL Nation |
