= Baddest Guy Ever Liveth =

Studio album by Olamide
- Released: November 7, 2013
- Recorded: 2012–2013
- Genre: Hip hop; yoruba music
- Length: 76:00
- Label: YBNL Nation
- Producer: Pheelz; V.I.C

Olamide chronology
YBNL (2012)	Baddest Guy Ever Liveth (2013)	Street OT (2014)

Singles from Baddest Guy Ever Liveth
- 1. "Durosoke" Released: May 1, 2013; 2. "Turn Up" Released: July 4, 2013; 3. "Yemi My Lover" Released: October 6, 2013; 4. "Eleda Mi O" Released: January 3, 2014

Baddest Guy Ever Liveth (abbreviated as BGEL) is the third studio album by Nigerian musician Olamide. It was released on November 7, 2013, by YBNL Nation. Recorded between 2012 and 2013, the album features collaborations with Pheelz, Ice Prince, Pepenazi, Phyno and Bez, among others. It was produced entirely by Pheelz, except for the thirteenth track "Sitting on the Throne".

Baddest Guy Ever Liveth was supported by the singles "Durosoke", "Turn Up", "Yemi My Lover" and "Eleda Mi O". Premium Times newspaper included the album on its list of the 5 yet to be released Nigerian albums of 2013. Afrikka Radio ranked the album 12th on its list of the top 12 best Nigerian albums of 2013. Baddest Guy Ever Liveth won Best Album of the Year at the 2014 Nigeria Entertainment Awards and was nominated for Rap Album of the Year at the 2014 City People Entertainment Awards. Moreover, it won Best Rap Album and Album of the Year at The Headies 2014.

== Background and promotion ==
Baddest Guy Ever Liveth was initially slated for release on October 14, 2013. However, it was postponed in order to support the release of Samklef's album. In a Twitter post, Olamide said, "Don't compete with your homies. Make money with your homies. Due to the respect and love I have for my homie Samklef, I'm holding my album back. Let's support Samklef." He unveiled the Caesar-inspired cover art on October 17, 2013. Shortly after the album's release, fans and colleagues mimicked the gunman pose seen on the album's cover.

The album's lead single, "Durosoke", was released on May 1, 2013, along with "Baddest Nigga Ever Liveth"; the latter track was recorded over Jay Z's "Dirt off Your Shoulder" instrumental. "Durosoke" was nominated for Song of the Year and Best Rap Single at The Headies 2013. The song's music video was directed by Clarence Peters and released exclusively on the Star Music platform. The album's second single, "Turn Up", was released on July 4, 2013. Its music video was directed by Moe Musa and incorporates various clips of Olamide's performances on tour.

The album's third single, "Yemi My Lover", was released on October 6, 2013. A writer for 360nobs applauded Olamide for his delivery and inclusion of Yoruba and Igbo slangs. The album's fourth single, "Eleda Mi O", was released on January 3, 2014. The accompanying music video for the song was photographed and directed by Unlimited L.A. On March 18, 2014, Olamide released music videos for the tracks "Anifowose" and "Sitting on the Throne".

== Composition ==
Baddest Guy Ever Liveth was primarily recorded in the Yoruba language. Olamide explores the depth of the language by rapping in different variations of it. The track "Dope Money" contains Ijebu, a western Nigerian variation of Yoruba. Olamide incorporated elements, punch lines, and themes of Yoruba music onto the album. "Eleda Mi O" contains a blend of indigenous rap and Jùjú music. In "Esupofo", he is reminiscent of a commercial version of Da Grin. The track "Position Yourself" was recorded over a Makossa beat, while the instrumental of "Gbadun Arawa" bears close resemblance to D'banj's "Mobolowowon".

== Critical reception ==
Professional ratings
Review scores
Source	Rating
TayoTV	6.5/10
The Boiler Nation	3.5/5 stars
Nigerian Entertainment Today	3/5 stars
TooXclusive	3/5 stars

Baddest Guy Ever Liveth received mixed reviews from music critics. InfoNubia's Sunkanmi Ogunsegha praised Olamide's rhyming skills, but criticized the album's songs for "sounding like freestyles that should probably stay on a mixtape." Reviewing for OkayAfrica, Audu Bey said the album's "length doesn't take away from it being thoroughly enjoyable" and that "success hasn't dampened Olamide's fire". Writing for Nigerian Entertainment Today, Ayomide Tayo awarded the album 3 stars out of 5, describing it as "a less-inspired version of YBNL constructed by a rapper that is creatively low at the moment."

TooXclusive's Ogaga Sakpaide also granted the album 3 stars out of 5, saying it is "packed with many fillers like its predecessor" and that its length "reduces the wow factor". The Boiler Nation awarded the album 3.5 stars out of 5 and felt it was a bit "overrated" when compared to his previous record. A writer for TayoTV, who goes by the moniker GhostBlogger, said the album was "disorganized, noisy in some parts, [and] lacked cohesion and freshness."

=== Accolades ===
Year	Awards ceremony	Award description(s)	Results
2014	The Headies	Best Rap Album	Won
2014	The Headies	Album of the Year	Won
2014	Nigeria Entertainment Awards	Best Album of the Year	Won
2014	City People Entertainment Awards	Rap Album of the Year	Nominated

== Track listing ==
No.	Title	Writer(s)	Producer(s)	Length
1.	"Intro" (featuring Do2tun)	Olamide Adedeji	Pheelz	1:34
2.	"Esupofo"	Adedeji	Pheelz	3:21
3.	"Rep Adugbo" (featuring Buckwyla and Pheelz)	Adedeji; Emmanuel Woko; Phillip Moses	Pheelz	3:54
4.	"Anifowose"	Adedeji	Pheelz	4:11
5.	"Skammer" (featuring Pele Pele)	Adedeji; Olanrewaju Pelepele	Pheelz	2:56
6.	"Eleda Mi"	Adedeji	Pheelz	4:23
7.	"Baddo Love"	Adedeji	Pheelz	3:32
8.	"Position Yourself"	Adedeji	Pheelz	3:23
9.	"Skit" (featuring Ketchup)	Adedeji	Pheelz	1:20
10.	"Gbadun Arawa"	Adedeji	Pheelz	3:40
11.	"Motivation" (featuring Ice Prince, Pepenazi and Endia)	Adedeji; Panshak Zamani; Opeyemi Kayode; Ujah Ujah	Pheelz	3:51
12.	"Church" (featuring Viktoh)	Adedeji; Viktoh	Pheelz	4:14
13.	"Sitting on the Throne"	Adedeji	V.I.C	4:28
14.	"Mu Emu" (featuring B.Banks)	Adedeji; B.Banks	Pheelz	3:57
15.	"Turn Up"	Adedeji	Pheelz	3:58
16.	"King Shii"	Adedeji	Pheelz	3:46
17.	"Durosoke"	Adedeji	Pheelz	4:20
18.	"Dope Money" (featuring Phyno)	Adedeji; Azubuike Chibuzo Nelson	Pheelz	4:24
19.	"Yemi My Lover"	Adedeji	Pheelz	3:32
20.	"Rayban Abacha"	Adedeji	Pheelz	3:28
21.	"Higher" (featuring Bez)	Adedeji; Emmanuel Bez Idakula	Pheelz	4:42
Total length:				76:00

Samples

- "Motivation" samples "Ghosts that We Knew", as performed by Mumford & Sons
- "Anifowose" samples "Omo Anifowose", as performed by Wasiu Ayinde Marshall

== Personnel ==
The following people contributed to Baddest Guy Ever Liveth:

- Olamide Gbenga Adedeji – primary artist
- Phillip Kayode Moses – primary producer, featured artist
- V.I.C – secondary producer
- Panshak Henry Zamani – featured artist
- Emmanuel Chukwubeze Woko – featured artist
- Onyido Nkemjika – featured artist
- Opeyemi Gbenga Kayode – featured artist
- Ujah Lawrence Ujah – featured artist
- Victor Ailenbuade – featured artist
- Sunday Shashamura – featured artist
- Azubuike Chibuzo Nelson – featured artist
- Olanrewaju Pelepele – featured artist
- Emmanuel Bez Idakula – featured artist

== Release history ==
Region	Date	Format	Label
Nigeria	November 7, 2013	CD, Digital download	YBNL Nation
