= Ycee =

Nigerian rapper (born 1993)

YCee
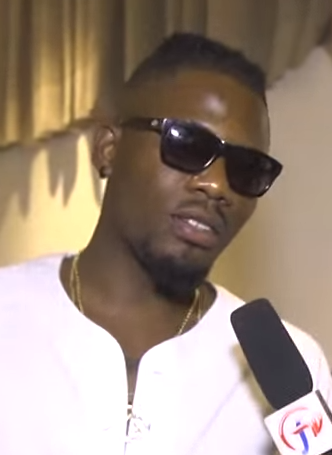
- Ycee speaking with Flytime Promotions in December 2017

Background information
- Also known as: Zaheer
- Born: Oludemilade Martin Alejo; 29 January 1993 (age 33); Lagos State, Nigeria
- Genres: Afropop; hip-hop
- Occupations: Rapper; singer; songwriter
- Instruments: Vocals; rapping
- Years active: 2012–present
- Labels: ANBT (current); Tinny (former); Sony (former)

Oludemilade Martin Alejo (born 29 January 1993), known professionally as Ycee (pronounced /ˈwaɪsiː/ WY-see; also stylized as YCee), is a Nigerian rapper, singer and songwriter. He gained popularity after his single "Condo", which features vocals by Patoranking, earned him two nominations at the 2015 Nigeria Entertainment Awards. He was also nominated for Best Artist in African Pop at the 2015 All Africa Music Awards and for Next Rated at The Headies 2016. Ycee signed a record deal with Sony Music in October 2016, but terminated his contract with the label in February 2018.

== Early life and education ==
Ycee was born in Festac Town, a housing estate in Lagos State, Nigeria. He completed his basic education at Dr. Soyemi Memorial Nursery and Primary School. He attended the Nigerian Navy Secondary School in Ojo for his secondary education. Ycee studied marine biology at the University of Lagos.

== Career ==
Ycee started his music career in 2012 as an underground rapper. He signed a record deal with Tinny Entertainment. Due to his educational engagements, he took a brief hiatus from music after gaining admission to the University of Lagos. Ycee released the critically acclaimed song "Condo" in May 2015; it was nominated for Best Collaboration of the Year and Best Music Video of the Year at the 2015 Nigeria Entertainment Awards. On 20 July 2015, he released the hit single "Jagaban". Nigerian rapper Olamide asked him to be featured on the remix. He gained further exposure after receiving a nomination for Revelation of the Year at the 2015 MTV Africa Music Awards. Moreover, he was nominated for Best Artist in African Pop at the 2015 All Africa Music Awards.

On 25 June 2017, "Juice" featuring Maleek Berry became the most popular new music on Nigeria radio, ranked number 1 by Playdata charts. Ycee sold out a headline gig at the O2 Academy Islington on 12 January 2018. The gig featured additional performances from his label mates Bella Alubo, Sona, Eugy, Ms. Banks and Flosha. On 15 January 2019, he announced on Instagram that he left Tinny Entertainment. He also announced the launch of his record label ANBT, an acronym for Ain't Nobody Badder Than.

Ycee released his debut studio album Ycee vs Zaheer on 8 November 2019. It is a mixture of hip-hop, trap, Afrobeats, Afro-house, hyphy, R&B and alte. The album serves as the follow-up to his 8-track debut EP First Wave (2017) and his collaborative EP with Bella Alubo, titled Late Night Vibrations (2018). The album was produced by Adey, Jay Bidz, Ballertosh, Fanatix, BeatsbyKarma, Syn X, Krizbeatz, Jay Popping, Buzzin Producer, AP Da Don, Two Seven, Elmore, Willis Give Dem and KO. It features collaborations with Davido, Niniola, Phyno, Ms Banks and Dapo Tuburna.

Over the course of his career and since his rise to prominence, Ycee has featured on notable records to break upcoming artists. He featured on records to break his label mate Dapo Turbuna "Nothing" Remix in 2016, Label Mate Bella on Radio in 2017 before going ahead to create a joint EP with her Late Night Vibrations. Ycee also featured on Big Man Doingz by Arosino alongside Dapo Tuburna and Karma. Some Say it was his way of giving back to emerging artistes as he was once on the receiving end of such impact through Olamide on his remix to Jagaban, his breakthrough single.

== Discography ==
=== Studio albums ===
- Ycee vs Zaheer (2019)

=== EPs ===
- First Wave (2017)
- Late Night Vibrations (with Bella Alubo) (2018)
- Love Drunk (2021)

=== Selected songs ===
Year	Song	Album
2012	"Smile On Me"	Non-album single
2012	"Pass Me"	Non-album single
2014	"Shots"	Non-album single
2015	"Condo" (featuring Patoranking)	Non-album single
2015	"Jagaban"	Non-album single
2015	"Jagaban" (Remix) (featuring Olamide)	Non-album single
2015	"Omo Alhaji"	Non-album single
2016	"Su Mi"	Non-album single
2016	"Panda" (Cover)	Non-album single
2016	"Omo Alhaji" (Remix) (featuring DJ Maphorisa)	Non-album single
2016	"Ahahn" ("Ooouuu" cover)	Non-album single
2017	"Link Up" (featuring Reekado Banks)	First Wave
2017	"Juice" (featuring Maleek Berry)	First Wave
2017	"Don't Need Bae"	First Wave
2017	"Wavy"	First Wave
2017	"Kill Nobody" (featuring Calibrii)	First Wave
2017	"Bubbly" (featuring Falz)	First Wave
2017	"Need To Know" (featuring Seyi Shay)	First Wave
2017	"N.O.U.N" (featuring KLY)	First Wave
2018	"Say Bye Bye" (featuring Eugy)	Non-album single
2018	"Your Love"	Non-album single
2018	"Juice" (Remix) (featuring Joyner Lucas)	Non-album single
2018	"My Side"	Non-album single
2019	"Balance"	Non-album single
2019	"Dakun"	
2019	"Mo Salah"	
2019	"Wahala Dey"	
2020	"Secreto"	
2020	Summa Nights	

== Awards and nominations ==
Year	Award ceremony	Award description	Recipient	Result
2015	2015 Nigeria Entertainment Awards	Best Collaboration of The Year	"Condo"	Nominated
2015	2015 Nigeria Entertainment Awards	Best Music Video of The Year	"Condo"	Nominated
2015	2015 MTV Africa Music Awards	Revelation of the Year	Himself	Nominated
2015	2015 All Africa Music Awards	Best Artist in African Pop	Himself	Nominated
2016	The Headies 2015	Rookie of The Year	Himself	Won
2016	The Headies 2016	Next Rated	Himself	Nominated
2017	AFRIMA 2017	Best African hip-hop	Himself	Won
2017	Soundcity MVP Awards Festival	Best Collaboration	Himself	Nominated
2019	The Headies 2019	Lyricist on the Roll	Himself	Nominated

== See also ==
- List of Nigerian musicians
