= Young Jonn =

Nigerian singer, songwriter and sound producer (born 1995)

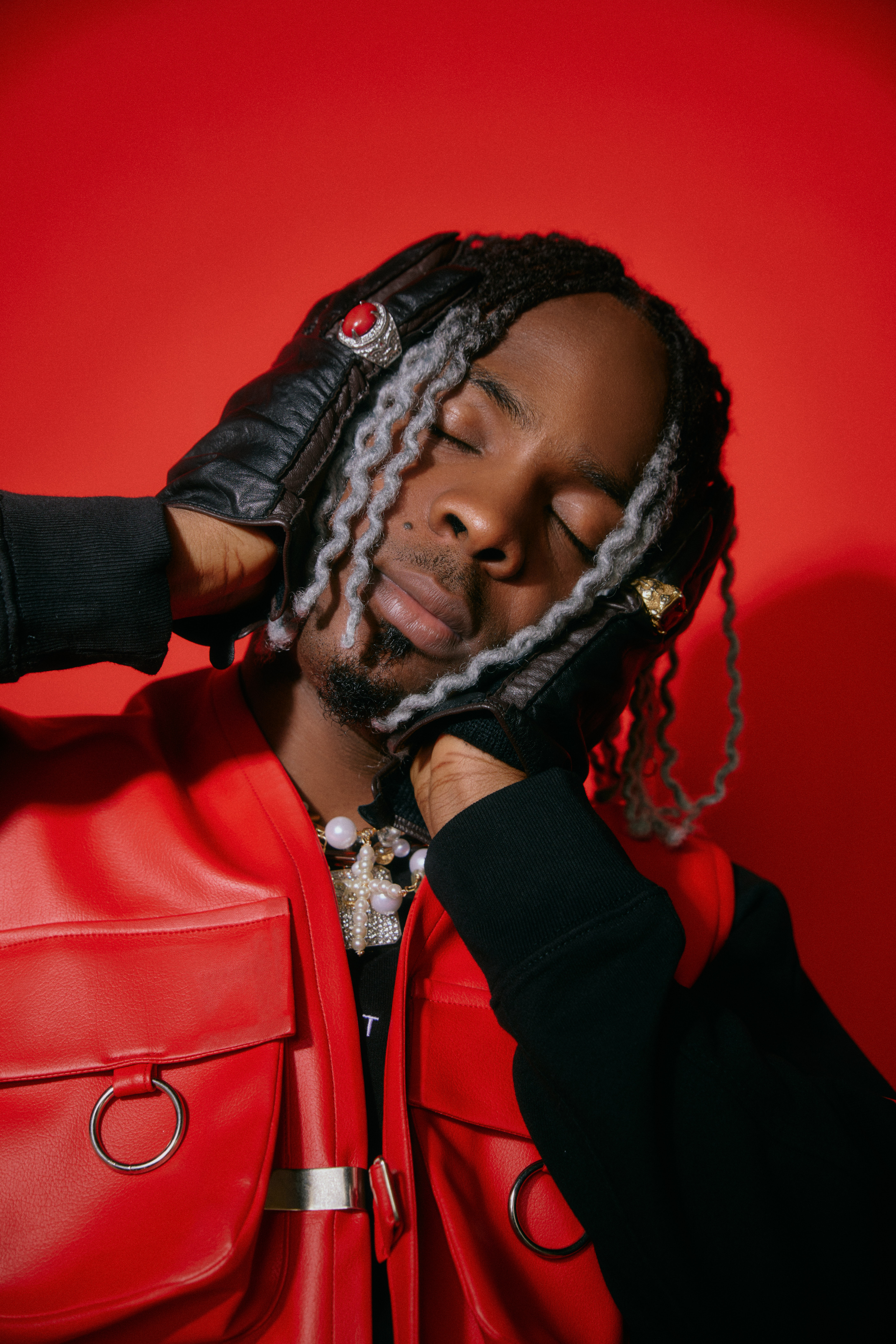

Background information
- Also known as: The Wicked Producer, Jiggy
- Born: John Saviours Udomboso; 16 February 1995 (age 31); Ibadan, Oyo State, Nigeria
- Origin: Akwa Ibom, Nigeria
- Genres: Afro pop; Hip hop; Afrobeats
- Occupations: Singer, songwriter & record producer
- Years active: 2010–present
- Label: Chocolate City

John Saviours Udomboso (born 16 February 1995), known professionally as Young Jonn, is a Nigerian singer, songwriter and record producer, currently signed to Chocolate City Music. He is also known for his hit singles Dada and the remix with Davido. He had music production credits on industry hits during the 2010s and was affiliated with the YBNL mafia family going on to be ranked #3 in The NET's list of "Nigeria's Top 7 Biggest Music Producers" and went on to be nominated in the "Producer of The Year" at the 2015 Nigeria Entertainment Awards and The Headies 2015.

== Early life and education ==
Udomboso was born in Ibadan into a Christian family, who came from Akwa Ibom. Udomboso attended the Ideal Foundation Primary School, Ibadan and GOF College, Osogbo, Osun State. During his high school days in Osogbo, he was interested in basketball, soccer, musical imstruments, miming and dance. He studied Communication and Language Arts at the University of Ibadan.

== Career ==
Udomboso started playing musical instrument as a child. He formed a group called AVG along with his brothers before he got signed to Hit Factory Studio in 2012. While working as producer at Hit Factory, he produced a chart-topping single by Olamide titled "Story For The Gods". He was nominated for "Producer of The Year" at the 2015 edition of The Headies for his work on "Bobo", a song by Olamide which rose to critical acclaim.

Udomboso has been credited for producing songs like "Gbese" and "Efejoku" by Lil Kesh, "Biggest Backside" by Davido and album credits including The Baddest by Davido, 2 Kings by Olamide and Phyno and Eyan Mayweather by Olamide.

In 2022, Young Jonn closed a deal with Chocolate City, with the release of "Dada", off his first extended play, Love Is Not Enough (Vol. 1), which was released on 1 April 2022. On 21 October 2022, Young Jonn released "Love is Not Enough" (Vol. 2). This project contained already-released Dada Remix, Normally, Next to You, Xtra Cool and If You Leave and Sokoto.

In 2025, Young Jonn released the single "Only Fans", marking his first release of the year. He subsequently released "Che Che", a collaboration with Nigerian singer Asake, followed by "Cashflow" featuring Wizkid.

In November 2025, he released his second studio album, Blue Disco. Upon release, the album debuted at number one on the Apple Music Nigeria albums chart.

In November 2025, Young Jonn released his sophomore studio album, Blue Disco, a 21-track project featuring guest appearances from Wizkid, Olamide, Asake, Rema, Focalistic, Shenseea, and DJ Tunez. Following the album's release, he returned on 29 May 2026 with the single "Elumelu," an uptempo track celebrating financial ambition and wealth inspired by businessman Tony Elumelu.

== Discography ==
=== Album and EPs ===
- Love Is Not Enough (Vol 1)
- Love Is Not Enough (Vol 2)
- Jiggy Forever (2024)
- Blue Disco (2025)

=== Singles ===
- "Dada"
- "Dada" (Remix) (feat. Davido)
- "Normally"
- "Xtra Cool"
- "Currency" (feat. Olamide)
- "Aquafina" (2023)
- "Sharpally" (2023)
- "Disconnect" (2023)
- "Go Hard" (2023)
- "Big Big Things" (feat. Kizz Daniel & Seyi Vibez) (2024)
- Sooner
- Ten Times
- Only Fans
- Che Che (Feat Asake)
- Cash Flow feat. Wizkid (2025)
- Elumelu (2026)

== Selected production credit ==
Year	Artiste	Title	Album
2014	Olamide	Blood Money	Street OT
2014	Olamide	Falila Ketan	Street OT
2014	Olamide	The Real MVP	Street OT
2014	Olamide	Prayer For Client	Street OT
2014	Olamide	Story For The Gods	Street OT
2015	Olamide & Phyno	Koba Koba	2 Kings
2015	Olamide & Phyno	Ladi featuring Lil Kesh	2 Kings
2015	Olamide & Phyno	Confam Ni featuring Wizkid	2 Kings
2015	Olamide	Bobo	Eyan Mayweather
2016	Davido	Biggest Backside featuring B-Red	Non-album single
2016	Lil Kesh	Semilore	Y.A.G.I
2016	Olamide	Pepper Dem Gang featuring Davolee	The Glory
2016	Olamide	Grind featuring Sossick	The Glory
2016	Olamide	Woyo	The Glory
2016	Kiss Daniel	Mama	New Era
2017	Flavour	Loose Guard featuring Phyno	Ijele - The Traveler
2017	Davolee	Oya Gbeff featuring Olamide	
2017	Lil Kesh	Rora	
2021	Lil Kesh	Don't Call Me	Non-album single

== Awards and nominations ==
Year	Event	Prize	Recipient	Result	Ref
2015	2015 Nigeria Entertainment Awards	Producer of the Year	Himself	Nominated	
2015	The Headies 2015	Producer of the Year	Himself	Nominated	
2016	The Headies 2016	Producer of the Year	Himself	Won	
2017	Soundcity MVP Awards Festival	African Producer of the Year	Himself	Won	
