= Bariga =

- Local Council Development Area
- Location of Bariga in Nigeria
- Coordinates: 6°32′6.0″N 3°23′41.0″E
- Country: Nigeria
- State: Lagos State
- LGA(s): Somolu
- Time zone: UTC+1 (WAT)
- ZIP code: 100223

Bariga is a district and suburb in Lagos State, Nigeria. It was formerly under Somolu local government area of Lagos State but in 2013 it was upgraded by the State government as a Local Council Development Area. The local government secretariat is located at 19, Bawala street, Bariga. Arguably defined by its natural style as quick to fit. It presently has as its Chairman Alabi Kolade David. It is the location of the oldest secondary school in Nigeria.

== Notable institutions ==
- CMS Grammar School, Lagos
- Baptist Academy Obanikoro, Lagos
- Eva Adelaja Girls Grammar School, Lagos
- Grace Secondary, Lagos

== Notable people ==
- Olamide – Nigerian rapper
- Lil Kesh – Nigerian rapper, singer
- 9ice – Nigerian singer-songwriter
- Kingsley Momoh Nigerian Journalist, Actor & MC

== See also ==
- Bariga Boys
