= Lil Kesh =

Nigerian rapper and singer (born 1995)

- Also known as: YAGI, Big Kesh
- Born: Keshinro Ololade; 17 March 1995 (age 31); Bariga, Lagos State, Nigeria
- Origin: Osun State
- Genres: Afrobeats; Hip hop; Afropop; Pop; Street pop; R&B; Reggae
- Occupations: Rapper; singer; songwriter
- Years active: 2012-present
- Labels: YBNL, YAGI Records

Keshinro Ololade (born 17 March 1995), known professionally as Lil Kesh, is a Nigerian rapper, singer and songwriter. He rose to the limelight after releasing the hit single "Shoki" in 2014.

== Early life and education ==
Ololade was born and raised in Bariga, an area in Lagos State. He attended Stockbridge College for his primary and secondary education, and then proceeded to the University of Lagos, where he studied Linguistics. Later, he moved on to the National Open University and studied Mass Communication online.

== Career ==
He began, his musical career in 2012 which was when he started rapping among his colleagues in Bariga. Shortly after, on 2 January 2014, he released "Lyrically", his debut single which went viral within Nigerian universities. Viktoh, another Nigerian rapper, heard the song and played it to Olamide. Olamide liked the song and signed Kesh to his record label, YBNL Nation. Under YBNL, Kesh dropped a series of hit singles like Shoki, Efejoku, Gbese, e.t.c and released his debut studio album, "YAGI". Subsequently in 2014, Lil Kesh released a hit single "Shoki". Shoki topped several musical charts and brought him to the limelight. As a result of this musical production, he was nominated for several awards and won two. In 2015, he was nominated for Best New Act at the 2015 Nigeria Entertainment Awards as a recording artist affiliated with YBNL Nation. In March 2016, Lil Kesh release his debut studio album Young And Getting It (Y.A.G.I) through YBNL Nation which was produced by Young John and Pheelz. Guest appearances were from Phyno, Ycee, Wale, Patoranking, Adekunle Gold, Davido, Viktoh, Olamide and Chinko Ekun. It incorporates hip hop and rap genre. It has four singles – Lyrically (2014), Efejoku (2015), Is it because I love You (2015), and Ibile (2016). Later that year, after the expiration of his contract with YBNL, Lil Kesh established his own record label YAGI Records (an acronym for "Young And Getting It") and is managed by Massive Management team, a marketing and event management company.

=== Artistry ===
The versatility and musical style of Lil Kesh is similar to that of Olamide, who raps and sings in his local dialect. However, he was criticized for using too much profanity and for failing to find the right balance in his songs' lyrics. In an interview with Naij, he said, "they are singles not an album, I know the kind of market am directing my songs to, I am from the streets, I know what the people from the street want to listen to...they should wait for my album that is expected to drop towards the end of the year. I have very positive songs".

== Discography ==
=== Studio albums ===
Year	Title	Album details
2016	Y.A.G.I	Released: 17 March 2016; Label: YBNL Nation; Formats: Digital download
2020	Ecstasy	Released: 19 Nov 2020 Yagi Records, distributed by Ziiki Media
2025	Forever Getting It (FGI)	Released: 10 April 2025 Yagi Records, distributed by Ziiki Media

=== Selected singles ===
Year	Title	Album
2014	"Lyrically"	Y.A.G.I
2014	"Shoki"	Non-album single
2014	"Shoki (Remix)" (featuring Olamide & Davido)	Non-album single
2015	"Shoki (Female Version)" (featuring Cynthia Morgan, Chidinma, Eva Alordiah)	Non-album single
2015	"Gbese"	Non-album single
2015	"Efejoku"	Y.A.G.I
2015	"Is It Because I Love You?" (featuring Patoranking)	Y.A.G.I
2016	"Ibile"	Y.A.G.I
2016	"Bend Down Select"	Non-album single
2018	"Again O"	Non-album single
2018	"Flenjor"(featuring Duncan Mighty)	Non-album single
2019	"Undertaker"	Non-album single
2020	"All The Way"	
2020	"Too Sweet"	
2025	TTGG (featuring Balloranking	
2026	Anini (Thief)	

== Awards and nominations ==
Year	Award ceremony	Prize	Recipient	Result	Ref
2014	tooXclusive Awards	Earth Shaking Collaboration	"Shoki (Remix)" (featuring Davido and Olamide)	Won	
2014	tooXclusive Awards	Best Street-Hop Track	"Shoki (Remix)" (featuring Davido and Olamide)	Won	
2014	tooXclusive Awards	Certified Banger of the Year	"Shoki (Remix)" (featuring Davido and Olamide)	Nominated	
2014	The Headies	Best Street-Hop Artiste	Lil Kesh for "Shoki"	Nominated	
2015	Nigeria Entertainment Awards	Hottest Single of the Year	"Shoki (Remix)" (featuring Davido and Olamide)	Nominated	
2015	Nigeria Entertainment Awards	Best Collabo of the Year	"Shoki (Remix)" (featuring Davido and Olamide)	Nominated	
2015	Nigeria Entertainment Awards	Best New Act to Watch	Himself	Nominated	
2015	Nigerian Teens Choice Awards	Song of the Year	"Shoki"	Won	
2015	MTV Africa Music Awards	Song of the Year	"Shoki (Remix)"(featuring Davido and Olamide)	Nominated	
2015	City People Entertainment Awards	Most Popular Song of the Year	"Shoki (Remix)"(featuring Davido and Olamide)	Won	
2015	City People Entertainment Awards	Best Collabo of the Year	"Shoki (Remix)"(featuring Davido and Olamide)	Nominated	
2015	African Muzik Magazine Awards	Best Dance in a Video	"Shoki (Remix)"(featuring Davido and Olamide)	Nominated	
2015	African Muzik Magazine Awards	Song of the Year	"Shoki (Remix)"(featuring Davido and Olamide)	Nominated	
2015	COSON Song Awards	Hottest Song on the Street	"Shoki (Remix)"(featuring Davido and Olamide)	Won	
2015	COSON Song Awards	Best Dance Song	"Shoki (Remix)"(featuring Davido and Olamide)	Nominated	
2015	The Headies	Next Rated	Himself	Nominated	
