= Chinko Ekun =

Nigerian rapper and songwriter

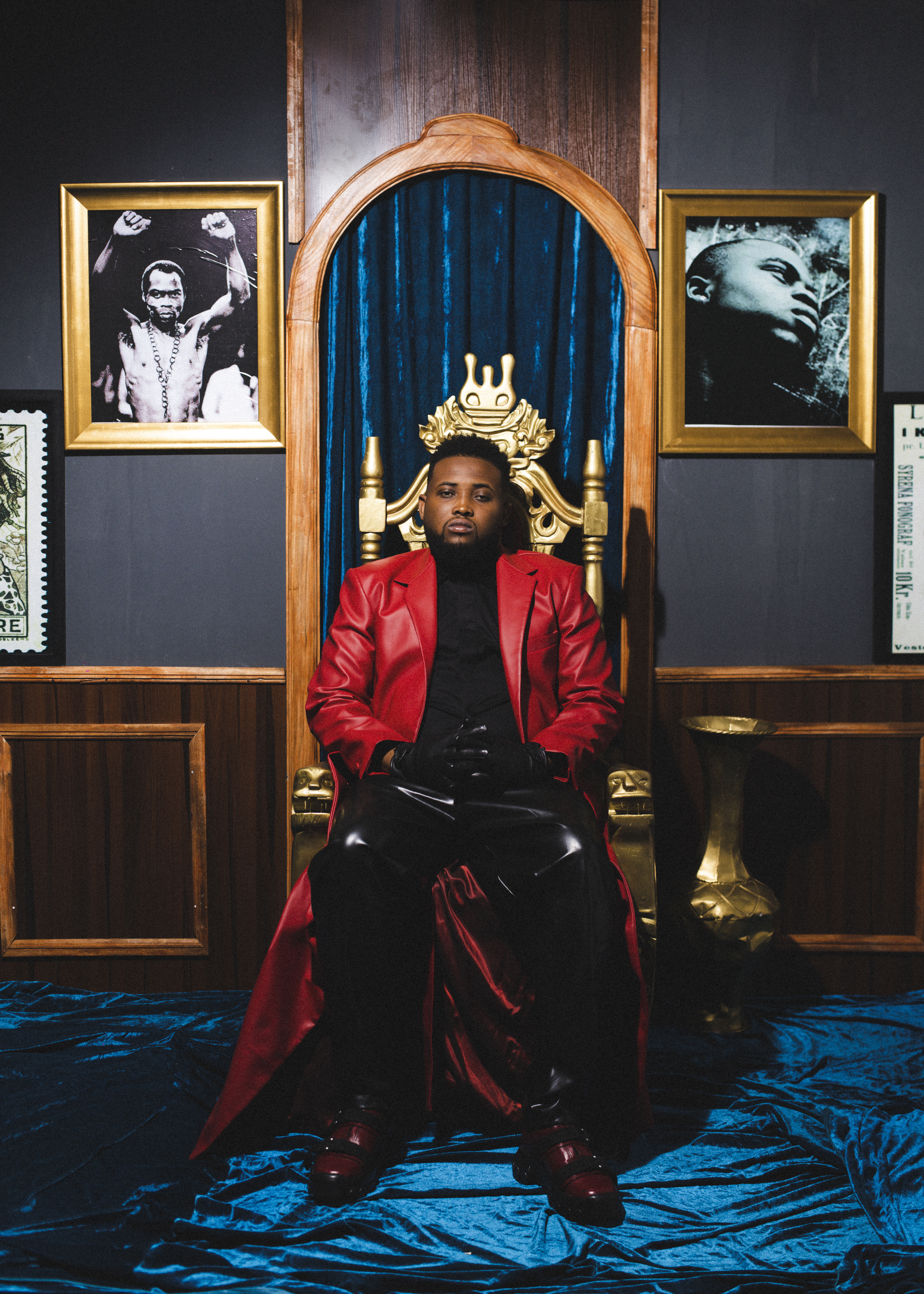
- Born: Oladipo Olamide Emmanuel; 13 September 1993 (age 33); Ikeja, Lagos State, Nigeria
- Education: Obafemi Awolowo University
- Occupations: Rapper; songwriter
- Musical career
- Genre: Hip hop
- Instrument: Vocals
- Years active: 2011–present
- Label: TIGER MUSIC LTD

Oladipo Olamide Emmanuel (born 13 September 1993), known professionally as Chinko Ekun, is a Nigerian rapper and songwriter.

== Early life ==
Chinko Ekun was born in Ikeja, Lagos State, Nigeria, into a family of three, where he is the second child. He is a native of Ikare, Ondo State, Nigeria.

== Education ==
Chinko Ekun attended Blessing Nursery and Primary School, Oshodi, Lagos State and Remade Nursery and Primary School, Igando, Lagos State. He attended Baptist Model High School, Ijegun, Lagos State for his secondary education. He graduated with a degree in law from Obafemi Awolowo University. He did his National Youth Service Corps in Lagos State.

== Career ==
=== 2011–2014: Career beginnings ===
At the age of 7, Chinko Ekun started developing passion for music. During his first year in the university, he picked interest in commercial and rap music. Chinko Ekun officially started his musical career in 2011, posting videos of his freestyles on Instagram. In 2013, he released "Ekun" as his first official track. In 2014, Chinko Ekun featured in Olamide's Street OT music album, on tracks "100 To Million", "Bang" and "Usain Bolt". He appeared on Olamide Live In Concert (OLIC) 2014, where he did freestyle performance. Chinko Ekun sings in English, Pidgin and Yoruba, focusing solely on hip hop music. One interesting thing about the biography of Chinko Ekun is his name. The name "Chinko Ekun" was coined from two words "Chinko" and "Ekun". "Chinko", because he was told that he looked like a Chinese during his time in the university and "Ekun", because it is his first official track.

=== 2015–present: YBNL Nation and Dek-Niyor Entertainment ===
In 2015, Chinko Ekun joined Olamide's YBNL Nation. He released his first official singles titled "Alejo Oran" and "Emi Na Re" through YBNL Nation on 25 February 2015. Barely a year later, he exited the record label after his contract expired, alongside fellow label mates Adekunle Gold and Viktoh. In 2017, he joined Dek-Niyor Entertainment, a Dubai based record label.

On 13 September 2018, he released a song titled "Able God" featuring Zlatan and Lil Kesh. The song earned him his first Headies award as "Best Street Hop Artiste" at The Headies 2019. The song received the nomination of "Popular Song of the Year" at the 2019 City People Music Awards. It won "Street Song of the Year" at the 2019 City People Music Awards.

== Personal life ==
Chinko Ekun married his long time girlfriend, Midun in Ibadan on Saturday, August 9, 2025.

== Discography ==
Title	Year
"Ekun"	2013
"Emi na re"	2015
"Alejo Oran"	2015
"Jen le yo"	2015
"Binu"	2016
"Bless Me"	2016
"Flenjo"	2016
"Wa Lo Da"	2017
"Gbefun"	2017
"Shake It"	2017
"Shayo"	2017
"Eruku de"	2017
"Yaso"	2018
"Bodija"	2018
"Switch It Up"	2018
"Able God" ft. (Zlatan Ibile and Lil Kesh)	2018
"Calling" ft. (Johnny Drille)	2018
"Semena" ft. (Peruzzi)	2019
"Mafo"	2019
"Party Animal"	2020
"Doings" ft. (Zlatan Ibile)	2020
"Jafafa" ft. (MohBad)	2020
"Gazor Lo" ft (SIJ)	2021

== Awards and nominations ==
Year	Award	Category	Recipient	Result	Ref
2020	Soundcity MVP Awards	Viewers' Choice	"Able God"	Nominated	
2019	City People Music Awards	Street Song of the Year	"Able God"	Won	
2019	City People Music Awards	Popular Song of the Year	"Able God"	Nominated	
2019	City People Music Awards	Best Indigenous Artiste of the Year	Himself	Nominated	
2019	The Headies	Best Street Hop Artiste	Himself, "Able God"	Won	
