= YBNL =

Record label in Lagos, Nigeria

YBNL Nation
- YBNL official logo
- Founded: 2012
- Founder: Olamide
- Status: Active
- Distributor: Empire Distribution
- Genre: Various
- Country of origin: Nigeria
- Location: Lagos State

YBNL Nation (an acronym for Yahoo Boy No Laptop Nation), or simply YBNL, is an independent record label founded by Olamide in 2012.

In 2020, Billboard magazine named YBNL as one of "the Gatekeepers" of the Nigerian music industry.

== History ==
YBNL Nation was founded during Olamide's time at ID Cabasa's Coded Tunes. Alongside Pheelz, he wanted a platform that supported collaboration among artists and producers. Olamide also used his growing earnings to mentor emerging talent, saying he needed to "spend money on people." This approach helped YBNL Nation develop several notable Nigerian artists. On 19 February 2020, YBNL Nation signed a distribution and publishing deal with Empire Distribution.

== Artists ==
=== Current acts ===
- Olamide
- Fireboy DML

=== Former acts ===
- Lil Kesh
- Viktoh
- Chinko Ekun
- Adekunle Gold
- Xino
- Davolee
- Lyta
- Picazo Rhap
- Pelepele (deceased)
- Limerick
- Yomi Blaze
- Temmie Ovwasa
- Asake

=== Producers ===
- B-Banks
- P.Priime
- Pheelz
- Young Jonn

=== Disc Jockey ===
- DJ Enimoney

=== Plugger ===
- Olaitan Salaudeen

=== Manager ===
- Alexander Okeke
- Oluwaseun Fasehun

== Releases ==
Year	Album title	Album Details
2012	YBNL	Released: November 12, 2012; Artiste: Olamide; Formats: Digital download, CD
2013	Baddest Guy Ever Liveth	Released: November 7, 2013; Artiste: Olamide; Formats: Digital download, CD
2014	Street OT	Released: November 14, 2014; Artiste: Olamide; Formats: Digital download, CD
2015	2 Kings	Released: April 1, 2015; Artiste: Olamide (with Phyno); Formats: Digital download, CD
2015	Eyan Mayweather	Released: November 23, 2015; Artiste: Olamide; Formats: Digital download, CD
2016	Y.A.G.I	Released: March 17, 2016; Artiste: Lil Kesh; Formats: Digital download, CD
2016	Gold	Released: July 28, 2016; Artiste: Adekunle Gold; Formats: Digital download, CD
2017	Lagos Nawa	Released: November 17, 2017; Artiste: Olamide; Formats: Digital download, CD
2018	YBNL Mafia Family	Released: December 14, 2018; Artiste: YBNL Mafia Family; Formats: Digital download, CD
2019	Laughter, Tears and Goosebumps	Released: November 29, 2019; Artiste: Fireboy DML; Formats: Digital download, CD
2020	999 (EP)	Released: February 9, 2020; Artiste: Olamide; Formats: Digital download, CD
2020	Apollo	Released: August 20, 2020; Artiste: Fireboy DML; Formats: Digital download, CD
2020	Carpe Diem	Released: October 7, 2020; Artiste: Olamide; Formats: Digital download, CD
2021	UY Scuti	Released: June 18, 2021; Artiste: Olamide; Formats: Digital download, CD
2022	Ololade Asake	Released: February 16, 2022; Artiste: Asake; Formats: Digital download, CD
2022	Playboy	Released: August 5, 2022; Artiste: Fireboy DML; Formats: Digital download, CD
2022	Mr. Money with the Vibe	Released: September 7, 2022; Artiste: Asake; Formats: Digital download, CD
2023	Work of Art	Released: June 15, 2023; Artiste: Asake; Formats: Digital download, CD
2023	Unruly	Released: August 8, 2023; Artiste: Olamide; Formats: Digital download, CD
2024	Ikigai / 生き甲斐 (Vol. 1)	Released: June 26, 2024; Artiste: Olamide; Formats: Digital download, CD
2024	Lungu Boy	Released: August 8, 2024; Artiste: Asake; Formats: Digital download, CD
2024	Adedamola	Released: August 29, 2024; Artiste: Fireboy DML; Formats: Digital download, CD
2025	Olamidé (album)	Released: June 19, 2025; Artiste: Olamide; Formats: Digital download, CD

== Awards and nominations ==
Year	Award ceremony	Prize	Result	Ref
2015	City People Entertainment Awards	Record Label of the Year	Nominated	
2016	City People Entertainment Awards	Record Label of the Year	Won	
