= Olamide discography =

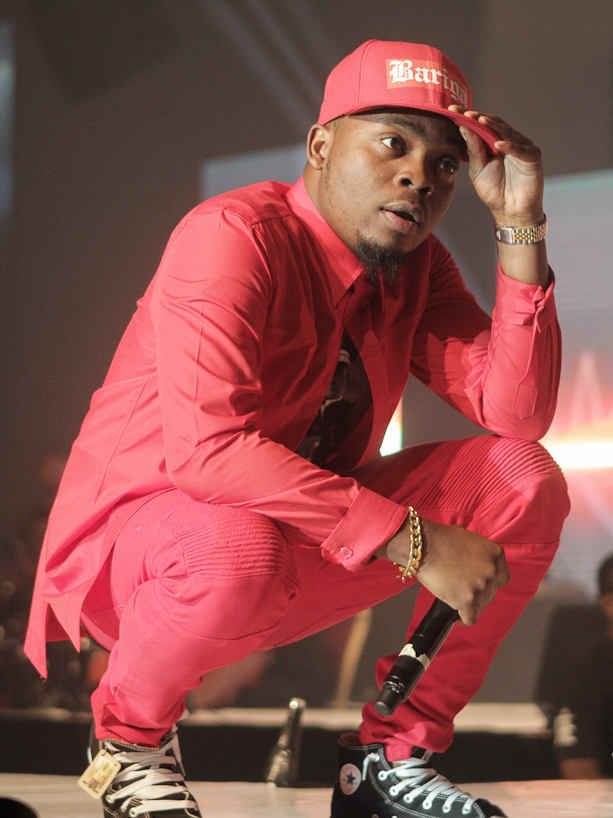
- Studio albums: 11
- EPs: 2
- Singles: 35
- Collaboration albums: 2

This is the discography of Nigerian rapper Olamide.

== Albums ==
=== Studio albums ===
List of studio albums, with selected details
Title	Album details
Rapsodi	Released: 21 March 2011; Label: Coded Tunes; Format: CD, digital download
YBNL	Released: 12 November 2012; Label: YBNL; Format: CD, digital download
Baddest Guy Ever Liveth	Released: 7 November 2013; Label: YBNL; Format: CD, digital download
Street OT	Released: 14 November 2014; Label: YBNL; Format: CD, digital download
2 Kings (with Phyno)	Released: 1 April 2015; Label: YBNL, Penthauze; Format: CD, digital download
Eyan Mayweather	Released: 23 November 2015; Label: YBNL; Format: CD, digital download
The Glory	Released: 26 December 2016; Label: YBNL; Format: Digital download, streaming
Lagos Nawa	Released: November 2017; Label: YBNL; Format: Digital download, streaming
Carpe Diem	Released: 8 October 2020; Label: YBNL, Empire; Format: Digital download, streaming
UY Scuti	Released: 18 June 2021; Label: YBNL, Empire; Format: Digital download, streaming
Unruly	Released: 9 August 2023; Label: YBNL, Empire; Format: Digital download, streaming
Olamidé	Released: 19 June 2025; Label: YBNL, Empire; Format: Digital download, streaming

=== Compilation albums ===
List of compilation albums, with selected details
Title	Album details
YBNL Mafia Family (as YBNL Mafia Family)	Released: 14 December 2018; Label: YBNL; Format: Digital download, streaming

== EPs ==
List of EPs, with selected details
Title	EP details
999	Released: 9 February 2020; Label: YBNL; Format: Digital download, streaming
Ikigai	Released: 27 June 2024; Label: YBNL, Empire; Format: Digital download, streaming

== Singles ==
=== As lead artist ===
List of singles as lead artist, showing year released and album name
Title	Year	Album
"Eni Duro"	2010	Rapsodi
"Omo To Shan" (featuring Wizkid)	2010	Rapsodi
"Ilefo Illuminati"	2011	YBNL
"First of All"	2012	YBNL
"Stupid Love"	2012	YBNL
"Voice of the Street"	2012	YBNL
"Durosoke"	2013	Baddest Guy Ever Liveth
"Turn Up"	2013	Baddest Guy Ever Liveth
"Yemi My Lover"	2013	Baddest Guy Ever Liveth
"Eleda Mi"	2014	Baddest Guy Ever Liveth
"Jogodo" (featuring Ajebutter22 and Lynxxx)	2014	Non-album singles
"Dansaki"	2014	Non-album singles
"Make Us Proud" (featuring Wale)	2014	Non-album singles
"Story for the Gods"	2014	Street OT
"Awon Goons Mi"	2014	Street OT
"Confam Ni" (featuring Wizkid)	2015	2 Kings
"Bobo"	2015	Eyan Mayweather
"Melo Melo"	2015	Eyan Mayweather
"Lagos Boys"	2015	Eyan Mayweather
"Matters Arising"	2015	Eyan Mayweather
"I Love Lagos"	2016	Non-album singles
"Abule Sowo"	2016	Non-album singles
"Who You Epp?" (solo or featuring Wande Coal and/or Phyno)	2016	The Glory
"Konkobility"	2016	Non-album single
"Sere (Ghetto Story)" (featuring Lil Kesh)	2016	Non-album single
"Owo Blow"	2016	The Glory
"Omo Wobe Anthem" (featuring Burna Boy)	2016	The Glory
"Love No Go Die"	2017	Non-album singles
"Wavy Level"	2017	Non-album singles
"Summer Body" (featuring Davido)	2017	Non-album singles
"Wo"	2017	Lagos Nawa
"Science Student"	2018	Non-album singles
"C. Ronaldo"	2018	Non-album singles
"Owo Shayo"	2018	Non-album singles
"Kana" (with Wizkid)	2018	Non-album singles
"Motigbana"	2018	YBNL Mafia Family
"Criteria"	2018	Non-album singles
"Logba Logba"	2018	Non-album singles
"Bugle"	2018	Non-album singles
"Poverty Die"	2018	YBNL Mafia Family
"Woske"	2019	Non-album singles
"Spirit"	2019	Non-album singles
"Oil and Gas"	2019	Non-album singles
"Totori" (featuring Wizkid and ID Cabasa)	2019	Non-album singles
"Pawon"	2019	Non-album singles
"Choko Milo"	2019	Non-album singles
"Eru"	2020	Carpe Diem
"Greenlight"	2020	Carpe Diem
"Rock"	2021	UY Scuti
"Ponpon" (featuring Fave)	2021	UY Scuti
"Loose It" (featuring Eskeez)	2021	Non-album singles
"Hate Me" (featuring Wande Coal)	2022	Non-album singles
"We Outside"	2022	Non-album singles
"Trumpet" (featuring CKay)	2023	Unruly
"New Religion" (featuring Asake)	2023	Unruly
"Hello Habibi" (featuring Russ)	2024	Ikigai
"Kai!" (with Wizkid)	2025	Olamidé
"99" (with Seyi Vibez, Asake, and Young Jonn featuring Daecolm)	2025	Olamidé

=== As featured artist ===
List of singles as featured artist
Title	Year	Album
"Mi Ole Beru (Noni Remix)" (Samklef featuring Olamide and B'ranks)	2011	Nonilizing
"E Wo Won" (Konga featuring Olamide)	2011	Show Time
"See We Now" (Ab-1 featuring Olamide)	2011	Non-album single
"I'm in Love" (Monimo featuring Olamide)	2011	Non-album single
"Tera Byte Swags" (2Phat featuring Olamide and Kida Kudz)	2011	Non-album single
"Kosere Ni Moscow" (Kida Kudz featuring Olamide)	2011	Non-album single
"Gbabe" (Lace featuring Olamide)	2011	Non-album single
"Never Let You Go" (DMI featuring Olamide)	2011	Non-album single
"No More Tuale" (2Kriss featuring Olamide)	2012	Non-album single
"Buate" (Young Stunna featuring Olamide)	2012	Non-album single
"Awon Boyz" (Young Stunna featuring Pherowshuz, Olamide, and Vector)	2012	World Domination
"As E Dey Hot" (Gentleman featuring Olamide)	2012	Non-album singles
"Ile Eru" (Tipsy featuring Olamide)	2012	Non-album singles
"What It Do" (Laylow featuring Jesse Jagz, Phenom, Yung6ix, Olamide, Buckwylla, Sossick, Phyno, Seriki, and Liu T)	2012	Non-album singles
"Beremole" (Ay.com featuring Olamide)	2012	Non-album singles
"Konji" (Stringz featuring Olamide)	2012	Non-album singles
"Olele" (Oluwaseun featuring Olamide)	2012	Non-album singles
"Ghost Mode" (Phyno featuring Olamide)	2012	No Guts No Glory
"Omo Lepa" (Danny Young featuring Olamide)	2012	Non-album singles
"Ere Itage" (ill'Mota featuring Olamide)	2012	Non-album singles
"Monster" (HCode featuring Olamide)	2012	Non-album singles
"Robo (Remix)" (Teeblaq featuring Dammy Krane and Olamide)	2012	Non-album singles
"Awa Lani Igboro" (Pherowshuz featuring Olamide)	2012	Non-album singles
"Sinner Man" (Pele Pele featuring Olamide)	2012	Non-album singles
"Calabar Loni Shan (Remix)" (XP featuring Reminisce, Olamide, and Skales)	2013	Non-album singles
"Suwe (Remix)" (Samklef featuring Olamide)	2013	4kp The Gift of God
"What's Your Flavour" (X-Project featuring Olamide)	2013	Non-album singles
"Gbaladun" (Lamboginny featuring Olamide)	2013	Non-album singles
"Serekode" (Pheelz featuring Olamide, Orezi, Phyno, and Terry Apala)	2013	Non-album singles
"Anti-Social" (Morell featuring Olamide)	2013	Non-album singles
"Won Ti Gbowo Mide (Remix)" (Mr Solek featuring Olamide)	2013	Non-album singles
"Oya" (Minus 2 featuring Olamide)	2013	Non-album singles
"Woni Were" (LKT featuring Olamide)	2013	The Journey
"I'm in Love (Remix)" (Harrysong featuring Olamide)	2013	Non-album single
"Government" (Reminisce featuring Olamide and Endia)	2013	Alaga Ibile
"Paper Boi" (Erigga featuring Olamide)	2013	Okorowanta
"So Fun E" (Opzy Don featuring Olamide)	2013	Non-album singles
"Tinini" (OzzyBosco featuring Olamide)	2013	Non-album singles
"Jumbo" (Shadow D'don featuring Olamide)	2013	Non-album singles
"Gimme Dat" (Ice Prince featuring Burna Boy, Yung L, and Olamide)	2013	Fire of Zamani
"Ibadi E (Bounce)" (D'banj featuring Olamide, Durella, Kayswitch, and J.Sol)	2013	D'Kings Men
"Standing Ovation" (DJ Shabsy featuring Ice Prince, Olamide, and Vector)	2013	Non-album singles
"Buddy Hanging" (Durella featuring Olamide)	2013	Non-album singles
"Bi Ororo" (Peggy featuring Olamide, Samklef, and Vector)	2013	Non-album singles
"Gbo Yoruba" (Tipsy Araga featuring Olamide)	2013	Non-album singles
"Don't Mess With My Doe" (Sossick featuring Olamide and Reminisce)	2013	Non-album singles
"Sexy Lady" (Adol featuring Olamide)	2013	Non-album singles
"Monster (Remix)" (HCode featuring Olamide, Durella, Dammy Krane, and Shobzy)	2013	Non-album singles
"Blow Am" (Duncan Mighty featuring Olamide)	2013	Grace & Talent
"For Example Remix" (Kayswitch featuring Wizkid and Olamide)	2013	Non-album single
"Before I Go Broke" (Yung6ix featuring Olamide)	2013	6ix O'clock
"Ibebe" (DJ Xclusive featuring Olamide)	2013	According to X
"Nawo Nawo" (YQ featuring Olamide)	2013	Non-album single
"Badderdandem" (Jahborne featuring Olamide)	2013	The Lost Files
"Je Ko Mo" (H.Millie featuring Isolate and Olamide)	2013	Non-album single
"Lambebe" (Major Bangz featuring Olamide)	2014	Non-album single
"Beat It" (Kida Kudz featuring Olamide)	2014	Non-album single
"Eyes On Your" (Skales featuring Olamide)	2014	Non-album single
"Mr Icey" (Sina Rambo featuring Olamide and Danagog)	2014	Non-album single
"Show Me Yuh Rozay (Remix)" (Ketchup featuring Olamide and Phyno)	2014	Non-album single
"36 Kinihun" (Lord of Ajasa featuring Olamide)	2014	Non-album single
"Lord Have Mercy" (K9 featuring Olamide)	2014	Non-album single
"Madantin (Remix)" (Jaywon featuring Phyno, Olamide, and May D)	2014	Oba Orin
"Our Lord Jesus" (YBNL Allstars featuring Olamide, Lil Kesh, and Viktoh)	2014	Non-album single
"Kilogbe (Remix)" (Sean Tizzle featuring Reminisce and Olamide)	2014	The Journey
"Wanbi" (Dotstar featuring Olamide)	2014	Non-album singles
"State of Nation" (Kwam 1 featuring Olamide)	2014	Non-album singles
"Ibadan" (Qdot featuring Olamide)	2014	Non-album singles
"WTF! (Remix)" (Illbliss featuring Olamide)	2014	Powerful
"Shoki (Remix)" (Lil Kesh featuring Davido and Olamide)	2014	Non-album singles
"So Le" (Tipsy featuring Olamide)	2014	Non-album singles
"Frosh" (H.O.D featuring Olamide)	2014	Non-album singles
"O Tin Load" (Tipsy Araga featuring Olamide)	2014	Non-album singles
"No More" (Chee featuring Olamide)	2014	Non-album singles
"Nicki Minaj" (Teeblaq featuring Olamide)	2014	Non-album singles
"Atewo" (Zeez featuring Olamide)	2014	Non-album singles
"Peteru" (Skuki featuring Olamide)	2014	Non-album singles
"Soke" (Joshbeatz featuring Olamide)	2014	Non-album singles
"Indomie" (Masterkraft featuring Olamide and CDQ)	2014	Non-album singles
"Kotobata" (Lami Phillips featuring Olamide)	2014	Non-album singles
"Deaf and Dumb" (Eva Alordiah featuring Olamide and Sarkodie)	2014	1960
"Ololo" (Ikechukwu featuring Olamide)	2014	Non-album singles
"Adura (Remix)" (Oyinkanade featuring Olamide)	2014	Non-album singles
"Ibadi" (DJ Kamol featuring Olamide, Lace, and Slyde)	2014	Non-album singles
"Ibeere (Remix)" (Kida Kudz featuring Olamide, Lil Kesh, and DJ Enimoney)	2014	Non-album singles
"My Heart O" (MC Galaxy featuring Olamide)	2015	Breakthrough
"Attendance" (DJ Spinall featuring Olamide)	2015	My Story: The Album
"Son of Abraham" (Pheelz featuring Olamide)	2015	Non-album single
"Local Rappers" (Reminisce featuring Olamide and Phyno)	2015	Baba Hafusa
"Indomie (Remix)" (Masterkraft featuring CDQ, Davido, and Olamide)	2015	Unlimited: The Tape
"Fo Si Won" (Ikechukwu featuring Olamide)	2015	Non-album singles
"Adam" (Pepenazi featuring Olamide)	2015	Non-album singles
"Shoro Niyen" (YBNL Allstars featuring Olamide, Lil Kesh, Viktoh, and Chinko Ekun)	2015	Non-album singles
"Walk with Me" (Stormrex featuring Olamide)	2015	Non-album singles
"69 Missed Calls" (Jahbless featuring Olamide, Reminisce, Lil Kesh, CDQ, and Chinko Ekun)	2015	I Am Me
"Allelu" (Wale featuring Olamide, Don Jazzy, and Reekado Banks)	2015	Non-album singles
"Bad" (Mo'Cheddah featuring Olamide)	2015	Non-album singles
"Chop Ogbono (Remix)" (Dr Sid featuring Olamide)	2015	Non-album singles
"Instagram Police" (Viktoh featuring Olamide)	2015	Non-album singles
"Ijo Ayo" (Skales featuring Olamide)	2015	Man of the Year
"Follow My Lead" (Victor Velmo featuring Olamide)	2015	The Sprout
"For Body" (Sunkanmi featuring Olamide)	2015	Non-album singles
"Sebee (Remix)" (Sossi featuring Olamide and Oritse Femi)	2015	Non-album singles
"Motiwa" (JJC featuring Olamide)	2015	Skillz
"Over the Mountain" (Sunkanmi featuring Olamide)	2015	Non-album singles
"Living Large" (Samklef featuring Olamide, DJ Xclusive, and Shaydee)	2015	Non-album singles
"Asiko Laiye (Remix)" (Darey featuring Olamide)	2015	Naked
"Renovation" (Rayce featuring Olamide)	2015	Non-album single
"Illegal" (Pepenazi featuring Olamide)	2015	My Coat of Many Colours
"Fine Boy" (L.A.X featuring Olamide)	2015	Non-album singles
"Repete (Remix)" (Deekay featuring Olamide)	2015	Non-album singles
"Reggae Blues" (Harrysong featuring Olamide, Iyanya, Kcee, and Orezi)	2015	Non-album singles
"Baba Oyoyo" (Fly Boy featuring Olamide)	2015	Non-album singles
"Islander" (Karma featuring Olamide)	2015	Non-album singles
"Ijo Ayo (Remix)" (Skales featuring Olamide and Pasuma)	2015	Non-album singles
"Standard (Remix)" (Bils featuring Olamide)	2015	Non-album singles
"Baddest" (DJ Neptune featuring Olamide, BOJ, and Stonebwoy)	2015	Non-album singles
"Ego (Remix)" (Bracket featuring Olamide)	2015	Non-album singles
"Yes Melo (Remix)" (Dotman featuring Olamide)	2015	Non-album singles
"Jagaban (Remix)" (Ycee featuring Olamide)	2015	Non-album singles
"Monsura" (Sound Sultan featuring Olamide)	2015	Out of the Box
"Emujo" (Mero featuring Olamide)	2015	Non-album singles
"The Money" (Davido featuring Olamide)	2015	Non-album singles
"Go Low (Remix)" (Klever Jay featuring Olamide)	2015	Non-album singles
"You Know?" (Small Doctor featuring Olamide)	2015	Omo Iya Teacher Reloaded
"Ibeji" (DJ Kaywise featuring Olamide and Vector)	2015	Non-album singles
"Carry Am Go (Remix)" (Damz featuring Olamide and Niniola)	2015	Non-album singles
"Werey Re O (Remix)" (Base One featuring Olamide and Phyno)	2015	Non-album singles
"Standing Ovation" (Tiwa Savage featuring Olamide)	2016	R.E.D
"Oya Dab" (DJ Enimoney featuring Olamide)	2016	Non-album singles
"Mama Oyoyo" (Premium Music featuring Yemi Alade, Iyanya, Olamide, Tekno, and Selebobo)	2016	Non-album singles
"Sisi (Remix)" (Sexy Steel featuring Olamide and Tekno)	2016	Non-album singles
"Seyi Shay" (Ruggedman featuring Olamide)	2016	Non-album singles
"Solo" (Dammy Krane featuring Olamide)	2016	Number 1
"My Baby Bad" (Samcole featuring Olamide)	2016	Non-album single
"Action" (Pasuma featuring Olamide)	2016	My World
"No Rush" (Selecta Aff featuring Olamide)	2016	Non-album single
"All I See (Joy)" (Kayswitch featuring Olamide)	2016	Non-album single
"Ebelesua" (Obesere featuring Olamide)	2016	Non-album single
"Bahd, Baddo, Baddest" (Falz featuring Olamide and Davido)	2016	27
"Garawa" (Sojay featuring Olamide)	2016	So Far
"Fada Fada" (Phyno featuring Olamide)	2016	The Playmaker
"Under the Blanket (Remix)" (Orezi featuring Olamide)	2016	Non-album singles
"Kolewerk (Remix)" (Koker featuring Olamide)	2016	Non-album singles
"Ponkriyon" (Bolo J featuring Olamide)	2016	Non-album singles
"Wine" (Ms. Jaie featuring Olamide)	2016	Non-album singles
"Lies People Tell" (YBNL Allstars featuring Olamide, Maupheen, and Delis)	2016	Non-album singles
"Carolina" (Que Peller featuring Olamide)	2016	Non-album singles
"Ojaju" (A.M featuring Olamide)	2016	Non-album singles
"Ah Skiibii (Remix)" (Skiibii featuring Olamide)	2016	Non-album singles
"Kilofoshi" (DKT Baba featuring Olamide)	2016	Non-album singles
"P.T.A (People Talk A Lot)" (DJ Enimoney featuring Olamide and Pheelz)	2016	Non-album singles
"Wait a Minute" (BOJ featuring Olamide)	2017	Magic
"Carry Go" (Chief Obi featuring Olamide)	2017	Non-album singles
"Yamarita" (Joe EL featuring Olamide)	2017	Non-album singles
"Gimmie Luv" (DJ Spinall featuring Olamide)	2017	Dreams
"Enough" (Galaktiq featuring Olamide)	2017	Non-album single
"Awaa" (Cabo Snoop featuring Olamide)	2017	Non-album single
"Follow Me" (Emekus featuring Olamide)	2017	Non-album single
"We Go Party" (Kcee featuring Olamide)	2017	Attention to Detail
"Nothing (Remix)" (Dapo Tuburna featuring Olamide and Ycee)	2017	Non-album single
"001" (Major Bangz featuring Olamide and Phyno)	2017	Non-album single
"Telli Person" (Timaya featuring Olamide and Phyno)	2017	Non-album single
"4.20" (Bbanks featuring Olamide)	2017	Non-album single
"Hustle (Remix)" (Tipsy featuring Olamide)	2017	Non-album single
"Bottles" (LasGiiDi featuring Olamide)	2017	Non-album single
"Read My Lips" (Lamboginny featuring Olamide)	2017	Non-album single
"Assignment" (DJ Consequence featuring Olamide)	2017	Non-album single
"Owonikoko" (Ice Prince featuring Olamide and Mr. Jollof)	2017	Non-album single
"Oja" (Masterkraft featuring Olamide)	2017	Non-album single
"Augment" (Phyno featuring Olamide)	2017	Non-album single
"My Body" (Zlatan featuring Olamide)	2017	Non-album single
"Oya Gbeff" (Davolee featuring Olamide)	2017	Non-album single
"Abakaliki 2 Lasgidi" (Humblesmith featuring Olamide)	2017	Osinachi
"Ayinde Wasiu" (Jaywon featuring Olamide)	2017	Non-album single
"Correct G!" (Ayo Jay featuring Davido and Olamide)	2017	Non-album single
"Titilailai" (D'Tunes featuring Olamide)	2018	Non-album single
"Pesin" (Limerick featuring Olamide)	2018	Non-album single
"Believe (Extended Remix)" (Ric Hassani featuring Falz and Olamide)	2018	Non-album single
"Time" (Lyta featuring Olamide)	2018	Non-album single
"O'Sure" (Oladips featuring Olamide)	2018	Non-album single
"Baba Sina Rambo" (Sina Rambo featuring Olamide)	2018	Non-album single
"Shawa Shawa" (DJ Neptune featuring Olamide, CDQ, Slimcase, and Larry Gaaga)	2018	Greatness
"Onyeoma" (featuring Olamide)	2018	Non-album singles
"P-Popping" (Viktoh featuring Olamide)	2018	Non-album singles
"Issa Goal" (Naira Marley featuring Olamide and Lil Kesh)	2018	Non-album singles
"40 Ft Containers" (Illbliss featuring Olamide)	2018	Illy Chapo X
"Small Girl Big God" (DJ Jimmy Jatt featuring Olamide and Reminisce)	2018	Non-album singles
"Aku (Remix)" (Slim Brown featuring Olamide and Kcee)	2018	Non-album singles
"Bam Bam" (Timaya featuring Olamide)	2018	Non-album singles
"Fine Fine" (M.anifest featuring Olamide)	2018	Non-album singles
"Again (Remix)" (Kida Kudz featuring Olamide)	2018	Non-album singles
"Naami" (DopeNation featuring Olamide and DJ Enimoney)	2018	Non-album singles
"Double Double" (Rudeboy featuring Phyno and Olamide)	2018	Non-album singles
"Balance Well" (Dammy Krane featuring Olamide, Pearl Thusi, and Medikal)	2018	Non-album singles
"Piom Piom" (DJ Prince featuring Olamide and Phyno)	2019	Non-album singles
"Waka Jeje" (Danny S featuring Olamide)	2019	Non-album singles
"Cool Down" (Fuse ODG featuring Olamide, Joey B, Kwamz & Flava)	2019	Non-album singles
"Vision 2020 (Remix)" (Bella Shmurda featuring Olamide)	2019	Non-album singles
"Instagram" (Reminisce featuring Olamide, Naira Marley, and Sarz)	2019	Non-album singles
"Gobe" (Pheelz featuring Olamide and Naira Marley)	2019	Non-album singles
"Blessings" (Minister Ladi featuring Olamide)	2019	Non-album singles
"Bosi" (Wale Turner featuring Olamide)	2019	Non-album singles
"Shomo" (DRB LasGidi featuring Olamide)	2019	Pioneers
"Pim Pim" (Dice Ailes featuring Olamide)	2020	Non-album singles
"Take" (Timi Dakolo featuring Olamide)	2020	Non-album singles
"420" (Bbanks featuring Olamide)	2020	Non-album singles
"Oja Majemi" (9ice featuring Olamide and Reminisce)	2020	Tip of the Iceberg Episode 1
"Tesinapot" (Jaido P featuring Olamide)	2020	Non-album singles
"Require" (DJ Tunez featuring Olamide)	2020	Non-album singles
"Currently" (Kizz Daniel featuring Olamide, Falz, and LK Kuddy)	2021	Non-album singles
"Sugar Daddy" (DJ Enimoney featuring Olamide)	2021	Non-album singles
"Survive" (Jaido P featuring Olamide)	2021	Non-album singles
"Omo X 100" (Reminisce featuring Olamide)	2021	Non-album singles
"LOML" (Cheque featuring Olamide)	2021	Bravo
"Shey You Fit Go?" (Trod featuring Olamide)	2021	Non-album singles
"Entertainer" (DJ Xclusive featuring Olamide and Jamopyper)	2021	Non-album singles
"Shamanya" (Phenom featuring Olamide and Phyno)	2021	Non-album singles
"Turn Me On" (WellKid featuring Olamide)	2021	Non-album singles
"Do You Wrong" (Phyno featuring Olamide)	2021	Something to Live For
"She Knows" (Harrysong featuring Olamide and Fireboy DML)	2021	God Amongst Men
"ZaZoo Zehh" (Portable and Poco Lee featuring Olamide)	2021	Non-album single
"See Level" (BackRoad Gee featuring Olamide)	2021	Reporting Live (From the Back of the Roads)
"Skelele" (Bad Boy Timz featuring Olamide)	2021	Non-album single
"Sometimes (Remix)" (T.I Blaze featuring Olamide)	2022	The Fresh Prince of Lagos
"Yeobayae" (T.I Blaze featuring Olamide)	2022	Non-album single
"Omo Ope" (Asake featuring Olamide)	2022	Ololade
"Bunda" (Spinall featuring Olamide and Kemuel)	2023	Top Boy
"Ojemba" (Phyno featuring Olamide)	2023	Non-album single
"Kpe Paso" (Wande Coal featuring Olamide)	2023	Legend or No Legend
"Currency" (Young Jonn featuring Olamide)	2023	Non-album single
"Amapiano" (Asake featuring Olamide)	2023	Work of Art
"Canada (Remix)" (Magnito featuring Olamide and Wizzy Flon)	2023	Non-album single
"Arizona" (Lojay featuring Olamide)	2023	Non-album single
"Joy" (Pheelz featuring Olamide)	2023	Pheelz Good (Triibe Tape)
"Entertain Me" (Magicsticks featuring Olamide)	2023	Non-album single
"Wahala" (CKay featuring Olamide)	2024	Emotions
"W" (Alpha P featuring Olamide and Thisizlondon)	2024	Non-album single
"Vibes on Vibes" (Liya featuring Olamide)	2024	Don't Hold Me Back
"Order" (Shallipopi featuring Olamide)	2024	Non-album singles
"Jah Love" (Peruzzi featuring Olamide)	2024	Non-album singles
"Gimme Your Love" (Zlatan featuring Olamide)	2024	Non-album singles
"Love in Tokyo" (Paul Play Dairo featuring Olamide)	2025	Non-album singles
"Girl On Fya" (Ashidapo featuring Olamide)	2025	Non-album singles
"Skido" (Victony featuring Olamide)	2025	Non-album singles
"Motivate" (Nissi featuring Olamide)	2025	Non-album singles
"Belinda" (L.A.X featuring Olamide)	2025	Non-album singles
"Formation" (Adekunle Gold featuring Olamide)	2026	Non-album singles
"Idi Bad" (KCee featuring Olamide)	2026	Non-album singles
"Zion" (Teni featuring Olamide)	2026	Non-album singles

== Promotional singles ==
=== As lead artist ===
List of promotional singles as lead artist
Title	Year	Album
"Apa Ti Jabo" (featuring ID Cabasa)	2011	Rapsodi
"Young Erikina"	2011	Non-album singles
"Unite" (featuring H-Code)	2012	Non-album singles
"Road to YBNL" (with Kida Kudz and 2Kriss)	2012	Non-album singles
"Arabambi"	2012	Non-album singles
"Rayban Abacha"	2013	Baddest Guy Ever Liveth
"Baddo Love"	2013	Baddest Guy Ever Liveth
"Confession Aiye"	2013	Non-album singles
"The Game" (featuring Phenom)	2013	Non-album singles
"First of All (Remix)" (featuring D'banj)	2013	D'Kings Men
"Going to Heaven"	2013	Non-album singles
"R.I.P" (featuring Vector)	2013	Non-album singles
"Take It Inside" (featuring Iyanya)	2013	Non-album singles
"Ko Duro Be" (featuring Viktoh and DJ Enimoney)	2014	Non-album singles
"Up in the Club" (featuring Viktoh)	2014	Street OT
"Zero Suffer" (featuring Shizzi and Wale Kwame)	2017	Non-album singles
"Road 2 Russia (Dem Go Hear Am)" (with Phyno)	2018	Non-album singles
"Ponpon" (featuring Fave)	2021	UY Scuti

=== As featured artist ===
List of promotional singles as featured artist
Title	Year	Album
"Touch Your Toes (Remix)" (Burna Boy featuring Dammy Krane, Olamide, and Vector)	2013	Non-album singles
"Gimme Dat (Remix)" (Ice Prince featuring Wande Coal, Olamide, and Yung L)	2013	Non-album singles
"YOYO (You're on Your Own)" (N6 featuring Olamide)	2014	Non-album singles
"Black Commando" (Fuse ODG featuring Olamide and Stanley Enow)	2014	Non-album singles
"Get Some Money" (Ice Prince featuring Olamide and Phyno)	2015	Non-album singles

== Covers and freestyles ==
List of covers and freestyles, showing year released
Title	Year
"Tonto Dikeh" (freestyle)	2013
"Baddest Guy Ever Liveth" (freestyle)	2013
"Otis" (freestyle)	2013
"Baddo" (freestyle)	2013
"Msarewole"	2013
"Bora" (freestyle) (Patoranking featuring Olamide)	2014
"Woss Wobi" (freestyle) (CDQ featuring Olamide)	2015
"Omo Ologo" (freestyle)	2018
"Puna" (freestyle)	2018
"Buga Small Small"	2019
"5am in Ojo" (freestyle) (Pheelz featuring Olamide, Poco Lee, and DJ YK Mule)	2024
"Idan Buruku" (freestyle)	2025

== Guest appearances ==
List of non-single guest appearances, with other performing artists, showing year released and album name
Title	Year	Other artist(s)	Album
"Who No Go Know"	2011	Jaywon	Meet Jaywon Reloaded
"Kedike" (Remix)	2012	Chidinma	Chidinma
"Kigbe"	2013	May D, Kayswitch	Chapter One
"Ka Wo Soke (Hands Up)"	2013	D'banj, Ikechukwu	D'Kings Men
"Don't Run"	2013	Burna Boy, Reminisce	L.I.F.E
"Shepe"	2013	Solidstar	Grace & Glory
"Aju (She Know It)"	2014	Phyno, Efa	No Guts No Glory
"Palongo"	2014	9ice	CNN
"O Pari"	2014	Falz	Wazup Guy: The Album
"Lori Standing"	2014	DJ Jimmy Jatt, D'Prince, Reekado Banks	The Industry, Vol. 1
"Da Yan Mo"	2014	DJ Jimmy Jatt, Lil Kesh, Viktoh	The Industry, Vol. 1
"Love Na Die"	2014	Dammy Krane	The Enterkraner
"Overflow"	2014	Timaya	Epiphany
"The Middle"	2014	M.I, TJ	The Chairman
"I Am Me"	2015	Jahbless	I Am Me
"Gone Are the Days"	2015	DJ Xclusive, Pepenazi	According to X
"Turn It Up"	2015	Iyanya	Applaudise
"Pack and Go"	2015	Seyi Shay	Seyi or Shay
"Kere"	2015	Naeto C	Festival
"Problem Child"	2016	Lil Kesh	Y.A.G.I
"Action"	2016	Pasuma	My World
"Mama Aboyo"	2016	Patoranking	God Over Everything
"Telephone"	2016	Reminisce	El-Hadj
"Life Is Eazi"	2017	Mr Eazi, Phyno	Accra to Lagos
"Fine Girl"	2017	Wale, Davido	Shine
"Jantolo"	2017	Yemi Alade	Black Magic
"Blessings"	2019	Phyno, Don Jazzy	Deal with It
"Scammers"	2019	Akon	Akonda
"Ring on It"	2019	Praiz	King
"I Dey Hear Everything"	2020	2Baba	Warriors
"Palanshe"	2020	Cracker Mallo	A Friendly Introduction to Saund
"Afar"	2020	Fireboy DML	Apollo
"Trabaye"	2022	Asake	Ololade
"Bigger"	2022	M.I, Nas	The Guy
"Modupe"	2022	Bnxn	Bad Since '97
"Orin"	2023	Reminisce	ATSG, Vol. 1
"Commona"	2024	Tiwa Savage, Mystro	Water & Garri (Original Motion Picture Soundtrack)
"One Day"	2024	Chike, Amaeya	Son of Chike
"Way Back"	2024	Khaid	444
"Treasure"	2024	Timaya, Phyno, Alpha P	Gladiator
"Jegede"	2024	Anti World Gangstars, Odumodublvck, Fatboy E	Nothing Changed
"Miami"	2025	Spinall, T.I.	Eko Groove

== Cameo appearances ==
Title	Year	Director(s)
"The Rain" (Samklef)	2013	Adasa Cookey
"Shoki" (Lil Kesh)	2014	Unlimited L.A
"Connect" (Phyno)	2015	Clarence Peters
"Eleniyan" (Que Peller)	2016	Frizzle

== Music videos ==
=== As lead artist ===
List of music videos as lead artist, showing date released and directors
Title	Year	Director(s)	Ref
"Eni Duro"	2010	DJ Tee	
"Young Erikina"	2011	Patrick Elis	
"Omo To Shan" (featuring Wizkid)	2011	DJ Tee	
"Unite" (featuring H-Code)	2012	Godfather Productions	
"Ilefo Illuminati"	2012	Godfather Productions	
"First of All"	2012	Patrick Elis	
"Voice of the Street"	2013	Mattmax	
"Stupid Love"	2013	Mattmax	
"Durosoke"	2013	Clarence Peters	
"Turn Up"	2013	Moe Musa	
"Eleda Mi O"	2014	Unlimited L.A	
"Anifowose"	2014	Kemi Adetiba	
"Sitting on the Throne"	2014	Kemi Adetiba	
"Story for the Gods"	2014	Unlimited L.A	
"Awon Goons Mi"	2014	Unlimited L.A	
"Skelemba" (featuring Don Jazzy)	2014	Unlimited L.A	
"Falila Ketan"	2015	Moe Musa	
"Bobo"	2015	Moe Musa	
"Melo Melo"	2015	Moe Musa	
"Lagos Boys"	2015	Unlimited L.A	
"MVP"	2015	Alexx Adjei	
"Eyan Mayweather"	2015	Unlimited L.A	
"Don't Stop"	2015	Unlimited L.A	
"I Love Lagos"	2016	Unlimited L.A	
"Abule Sowo"	2016	Adasa Cookey	
"Who You Epp?" (featuring Wande Coal and Phyno)	2016	Sesan	
"Konkobility"	2016	Unlimited L.A	
"Owo Blow"	2016	Clarence Peters	
"The Glory Intro"	2016	Moe Musa	
"Pepper Dem Gang" (featuring Davolee)	2017	Moe Musa	
"Letter to Milli"	2017	Moe Musa	
"Journey of a Thousand Miles"	2017	Moe Musa	
"Wavy Level"	2017	Moe Musa	
"Summer Body" (featuring Davido)	2017	Joey Yung Spike	
"Love No Go Die"	2017	Gbenga "Mannie" Ajetombi	
"Wo"	2017	Unlimited L.A	
"Science Student"	2018	Unlimited L.A	
"Kana" (with Wizkid)	2018	Sesan	
"Motigbana"	2018	Unlimited L.A	
"Logba Logba"	2018	Unlimited L.A	
"Poverty Die"	2018	Unlimited L.A	
"Woske"	2019	Unlimited L.A	
"Oil & Gas"	2019	TG Omori	
"Totori" (with Wizkid and ID Cabasa)	2019	TG Omori	
"Pawon"	2019	TG Omori	
"Eru"	2020	Clarence Peters	
"Green Light"	2020	Clarence Peters	
"Triumphant" (featuring Bella Shmurda)	2020	Clarence Peters	
"Infinity" (featuring Omah Lay)	2020	Clarence Peters	
"Loading" (featuring Bad Boy Timz)	2020	Clarence Peters	
"Rock"	2021	Clarence Peters	
"Julie"	2021	Patrick Elis	
"Jailer" (featuring Bad Boy Timz)	2021	Clarence Peters	
"Hate Me" (featuring Wande Coal)	2022	TG Omori	
"Trumpet" (featuring CKay)	2023	Jyde Ajala	
"New Religion" (featuring Asake)	2023	Jyde Ajala	
"Jinja"	2023	Jyde Ajala	
"Problem"	2023	Jyde Ajala	
"Metaverse"	2024	Jyde Ajala	
"Uptown Disco" (featuring Fireboy DML and Asake)	2024	Jyde Ajala	
"Hello Habibi" (featuring Russ)	2024	Jyde Ajala	
"Kai!" (with Wizkid)	2025	Jyde Ajala	
"99" (with Seyi Vibez, Asake, and Young Jonn featuring Daecolm)	2025	Liam S. Gleesen	
"Billionaires Club" (featuring Wizkid and Darkoo)	2025	Jyde Ajala	
"Luvaluvah"	2025	Jyde Ajala	
