= Mattmax =

Nigerian Video Director (b. 1983)

- Born: Matthew Abiodun Aina; Lagos, Nigeria
- Education: Yaba College of Technology
- Occupation: Cinematographer | Music Video Director | Filmmaker | Commercial Director
- Years active: 2005–present
- Spouse: Deola Aina
- Website: directormattmax.com

Mattmax (born Matthew Abiodun Aina) is a Nigerian music video director, cinematographer, commercial director, and filmmaker. Mattmax is the CEO and owner of Mattmax Productions. He has written and directed music videos for numerous artists across an array of genres including Timaya, Terry G, Olamide, Burna Boy, J. Martins, Dj Xclusive, Dj Spinall, Omawumi, and Waje.

== Early life ==
Born to Christian parents and christened Matthew Abiodun Aina, Mattmax studied Computer Science at Yaba College of Technology, Lagos. After college, he studied visual effects on the internet. According to him, "Everything I know today is self-taught, stumbling on the internet here and there." Mattmax is married to Eniola Adeola Aina of Dartistebyawele and attends Cathedral Church Of Christ, Lagos.

== Career ==
After a year of rigorous self-study, Mattmax was approached by artist Slim Joe to direct the music video for his single, "O ti yanyan". The video exceeded Slim Joe's expectations and became popular. After seeing his work on TV, Mattmax decided he would never stop. Years later, he shot Olamide's "Voice of the street" and D Banj's "Don’t tell me nonsense", putting him in the spotlight. His videos have received several nominations and awards, including seven nominations at the Nigerian Music and Video Awards. Mattmax continues to work with artists in various genres, such as Grammy-nominated Burna Boy and Timaya. Mattmax was listed as one of the top ten Nigerian Music Video Directors by popular blog Naijaloaded.

== Selected videography ==
- Burna Boy – "Halleluyah"
- Olu Maintain - "Excuse My French"
- J Martins - "Faro"
- Olamide - "Stupid love"
- K-Switch - "For Example"
- D-Banj - "Don't tell me nonsense"
- Olamide – "Voice of the street"
- Burna Boy– "Check and Balance"
- Vector – "King Kong"
- Burna Boy – "Soke"
- Agoha – "Choko Milo"
- D'Banj – "Superstar"

== Awards ==
Year	Project	Ceremony	Category	Result
2013	D'Banj, "Don't tell me nonsense"	NMVA (Nigerian Music Video Awards)	Video of the year	Won
2013	D'Banj, "Don't tell me nonsense"	NMVA (Nigerian Music Video Awards)	Best Afro-pop Video	Won
