= Carpe Diem (Olamide album) =

Studio album by Olamide
- Released: 8 October 2020
- Recorded: July 2020
- Genre: Afrobeats; hip-hop
- Length: 38:06
- Language: English; Nigerian Pidgin; Yoruba
- Label: YBNL Nation; Empire Distribution
- Producer: Pheelz; P.Priime; ID Cabasa; Vstix; Young Jonn

Olamide chronology
999 (2020)	Carpe Diem (2020)	UY Scuti (2021)

Singles from Carpe Diem
- 1. "Eru" Released: 8 September 2020; 2. "Greenlight" Released: 1 October 2020

Carpe Diem is the eighth studio album by Nigerian rapper Olamide, released on October 8, 2020. The album features guest appearances from Phyno, Fireboy DML, Bella Shmurda, Omah Lay, Peruzzi, and Bad Boy Timz. P.Priime mainly handled its production, with assistance from Pheelz, Vstix, ID Cabasa and Young Jonn. It serves as his first body of work under American label and distribution company, Empire Distribution. On 1 June 2021, Carpe Diem surpassed 500 million streams on most major music streaming services.

== Background ==
In July 2020, Olamide announced he had finished recording his album. He released the tracklist for the album on 1 October 2020. Its release coincided with the escalation of the #EndSARS protests in Nigeria. In an interview with The Native, Olamide said promotional activities were reduced as he focused on supporting calls against police brutality. He stated that he did not regret the release timing and expressed confidence in the album’s longevity despite the circumstances.

== Critical reception ==
Professional ratings
Review scores
Source	Rating
Gilox	8/10
Naijaloaded	8/10
Pulse Nigeria	8.5/10
tooXclusive	5/5 stars

Motolani Alake of Pulse Nigeria stated that Carpe Diem is only bettered by Baddest Guy Ever Liveth in Olamide's discography; he then stated that the album "has zero fillers" and it "has a topical sonic and topical cohesion merged with a topical progression that no other Olamide album has." Alake called it "his calmest and most methodical bit of music" that "marries contemporary conformity with a unique identity". Tami Makinde of The Native described Carpe Diem as a "solid project and a stark reminder that the afropop/rap landscape is always changing," adding that Olamide "continues to show why he will always have the clubs and streets on in a chokehold" while showing a "newer more-refined side," despite containing some "filler tracks" in its love songs.

Afeez Lawal of Naijaloaded awarded the album 8 stars out of 10, while Olalekan Okeremilekun of tooXclusive gave a 5/5 rating, stating "the album shows growth and innovation, but it has a lot of contenders and only time will tell its place in a year when a lot of artistes have made efforts to transcend their previous efforts." He concluded that "for now, it's worth listening to." A writer for Gilox that goes by the moniker Blue H, noted Carpe Diem is a showcase of "Olamide and P.Priime dishing out good music," adding that "they set out to make enjoyable music and have achieved that, and for that they deserve accolades," ending the review with an 8/10 rating.

=== Accolades ===
Award	Year	Category	Result	Ref.
All Africa Music Awards	2021	Album of the Year	Nominated	
The Headies	2022	Album of the Year	Nominated	
The Headies	2022	Rap Album of the Year	Nominated	

== Commercial performance ==
8 months after its release, Carpe Diem surpassed 500 million streams across all recognized music streaming platforms. This made Olamide the first rapper in Africa to achieve this milestone in a very short time.

== Track listing ==
Carpe Diem track listing
No.	Title	Writer(s)	Producer(s)	Length
1.	"Another Level"	Olamide Adedeji	P.Priime	2:55
2.	"Green Light"	Adedeji	P.Priime	3:15
3.	"Infinity" (featuring Omah Lay)	Adedeji; Stanley Didia	P.Priime	2:52
4.	"Eru"	Adedeji	P.Priime	3:03
5.	"Triumphant" (featuring Bella Shmurda)	Adedeji; Akinbiyi Ahmed	Pheelz	2:54
6.	"At Your Service"	Adedeji	ID Cabasa	3:12
7.	"Do Better"	Adedeji	Young Jonn	3:13
8.	"Chimichanga"	Adedeji	P.Priime	2:59
9.	"Shilalo" (featuring Phyno)	Adedeji; Chibuzor Azubuike	P.Priime	2:59
10.	"Loading" (featuring Bad Boy Timz)	Adedeji; Olorunyomi Oloruntimilehin	P.Priime	3:15
11.	"Unconditionally" (featuring Peruzzi)	Adedeji; Tobechukwu Okoh	Vstix	4:25
12.	"Plenty" (featuring Fireboy DML)	Adedeji; Adedamola Adefolahan	Pheelz	2:50

== Charts ==
Chart performance for Carpe Diem
Chart (2022)	Peak position
Nigerian Albums (TurnTable)	37

== Release history ==
Release history and formats for Carpe Diem
Region	Date	Format	Label
Worldwide	8 October 2020	Streaming; digital download	YBNL; Empire
United States	26 November 2021	Vinyl; LP	YBNL; Empire
