= Science Student =

Single by Olamide
- Released: 11 January 2018
- Genre: Afrobeats; street-hop
- Length: 3:23
- Label: YBNL
- Songwriter: Olamide Adedeji
- Producers: Young Jonn; Bbanks

Olamide singles chronology
"Correct G!" (2017)	"Science Student" (2018)	"Titilailai" (2018)

Music video
- "Science Student" on YouTube

"Science Student" is a song by Nigerian rapper Olamide. It was released by YBNL Nation on 11 January 2018 as his first solo release following his seventh studio album Lagos Nawa (2017). The Afrobeats and street-hop song was produced by Young Jonn and Bbanks and addresses drug use among Nigerian youths through lyrics that describe the mixing and consumption of various substances.

Following its release, the song generated controversy over its portrayal of drug use. Olamide stated that the song was intended to discourage drug abuse, while the National Broadcasting Commission (NBC) later issued a Not To Be Broadcast (NTBB) warning against it. The music video, directed by Unlimited L.A, was released on 26 February 2018 and drew comparisons to Michael Jackson's "Thriller" music video. The song received several award nominations and won Best Street-Hop Track at the tooXclusive Awards.

== Composition and lyrics ==
"Science Student" is an Afrobeats and street-hop song performed in Yoruba and co-produced by Young Jonn and Bbanks. The song addresses drug use among Nigerian youths and portrays the practice of experimenting with different combinations of substances. The term "science student" refers to young people who experiment with mixtures of drugs and other substances to achieve stronger highs, while the lyrics describe various forms of substance use and the people who engage in them.

The song's chorus describes this lifestyle through references to mixing different substances, including the line "they have mixed chemicals, science students". Pulse Nigeria interpreted the lyrics as a portrayal of individuals who experiment with various substances, with later lines mentioning individuals who will use various substances they encounter and advising them to "take it easy." The song also references traditional alcoholic drinks associated with street culture at its outro.

== Controversy and reception ==
Following its release, "Science Student" faced criticism from some listeners and commentators who accused the song of promoting or celebrating drug use among Nigerian youths. Don Pedro Obaseki, a filmmaker and communications expert, called for the song to be banned, claiming that its lyrics encouraged young people to use and mix illicit substances. Moses Siasia, chairman of the Nigerian Young Professionals Forum, also criticized the song and called on regulatory bodies to take action, arguing that it promoted drug abuse among youths. Olamide responded by stating that the song was not intended to encourage drug abuse, but rather to highlight the issue and encourage listeners affected by it to change their behavior. He urged listeners to avoid abusing alcohol, stop mixing unknown substances, and "live responsibly" while encouraging them to focus on "purpose fulfillment and passion discovery". He also called on listeners to help "put an end to drug abuse and save as many lives as possible".

=== NBC ban ===
In January 2018, the National Broadcasting Commission (NBC) issued a Not To Be Broadcast (NTBB) warning against "Science Student", declaring the song "unfit for broadcast" on radio and television stations. According to NBC officials, the decision was based on what the commission described as the "profligate mention" and subtle promotion of illegal drugs. The commission clarified that it had not banned the song itself, but directed broadcasters not to air it and warned that stations that failed to comply could face sanctions.

=== Critical response ===
Music journalists and commentators had different opinions on the song's message and whether it should be banned. Linda Orajekwe of Notjustok argued that "Science Student" should not be banned, writing that listeners should distinguish between "promotion and awareness" and stating that Olamide was highlighting an existing issue rather than encouraging drug use. Tomiwa Isiaka of The Native described the song as a reflection of Nigeria's drug problem, arguing that the controversy should focus on addressing the issue itself rather than removing the song from public discussion. Gbenga Adebambo of The Guardian criticized the song's message, arguing that its references to drugs could negatively influence youths and stating that Olamide's explanation was not enough to clarify its intent. Onoshe Nwabuikwu of The Punch similarly questioned the song's approach, arguing that its detailed references to substances could make listeners more curious about them despite Olamide's claim that it was meant to discourage drug abuse.

== Music video ==
The music video for "Science Student" was released on 26 February 2018. It was directed by Unlimited L.A with creative direction and choreography by Kaffy. The seven-minute visual follows Olamide through a building populated by individuals portrayed as drug users, while incorporating scenes intended to reinforce the song's anti-drug message, including "Say No To Drugs" inscriptions and Olamide rejecting an offered drink. The video concludes with a large shaku shaku dance sequence featuring over 100 dancers from the Imagneto Dance Company. Several publications noted similarities between the video's choreography and horror-inspired imagery and those of Michael Jackson's music video for "Thriller", while also incorporating elements associated with Nigerian street culture.

== Accolades ==
Awards and nominations for "Science Student"
Organization	Year	Category	Result	Ref.
tooXclusive Awards	2018	Best Street-Hop Track	Won	
tooXclusive Awards	2018	Song of the Year	Nominated	
Nigeria Entertainment Awards	2018	Hottest Single of the Year	Nominated	
The Beatz Awards	2018	Music Video Director of the Year (Unlimited L.A for "Science Student")	Won	
The Beatz Awards	2018	Best Choreographer (Kaffy for "Science Student")	Nominated	
The Beatz Awards	2018	Afro Hip-Hop Producer of the Year (Bbanks and Young Jonn for "Science Student")	Nominated	
Soundcity MVP Awards Festival	2019	Video of the Year	Nominated	
Soundcity MVP Awards Festival	2019	Viewer's Choice	Nominated	
