= YBNL (album) =

2012 studio album by Olamide

Studio album by Olamide
- Released: 12 November 2012
- Recorded: 2011–2012
- Genre: Hip hop
- Length: 79:38
- Label: YBNL Nation
- Producer: Olamide (exec.); Pheelz; Samklef; I.D Cabasa; 2Kriss; Tyrone

Olamide chronology
Rapsodi (2011)	YBNL (2012)	Baddest Guy Ever Liveth (2013)

Singles from YBNL
- 1. "Ilefo Illuminati" Released: November 20, 2011; 2. "First of All" Released: June 21, 2012; 3. "Stupid Love" Released: July 27, 2012, 4. "Voice of the Street" Released: November 1, 2012

YBNL (an acronym for Yahoo Boy No Laptop) is the second studio album by Nigerian musician Olamide. It was released by YBNL Nation on 12 November 2012. A follow-up to his debut studio album, Rapsodi (2011), YBNL features collaborations with Kayswitch, Tiwa Savage, Dammy Krane, Davido, Kida Kudz, and Reminisce, among others. Its production was handled by Pheelz, Samklef, I.D Cabasa, 2Kriss and Tyrone. YBNL was supported by the singles "Ilefo Illuminati", "First of All", "Stupid Love" and "Voice of the Street".

== Release ==
The album's launch party, which was held at Octopus Club in Yaba, Lagos, featured additional performances from Dammy Krane, Morell, DJ Zeez, Phyno, Phenom, Samklef, Skales and Lace. Prior to the launch party, Olamide held a concert at Mazabs Event Centre in Ilorin on 21 March 2013. The album was released digitally on 21 June 2013.

The 2Kriss-produced track "Ilefo Illuminati" was released on 20 November 2011, as the album's lead single. Its music video was filmed in South Africa by Godfather Productions and released on 23 June 2012. The Pheelz-produced track "First of All" was released on 21 June 2012, as the album's second single. The accompanying music video for the song was shot and directed in Nigeria by Patrick Ellis.

The remix of "First of All" features vocals by D'banj and appeared on the 2013 compilation album, D'Kings Men. The Samklef-produced track "Stupid Love" was released on 27 July 2012, as the album's third single. The song's music video was directed by Matt Max. The album's fourth single, "Voice of the Street", was released on 1 November 2012. Its accompanying music video was also directed by Matt Max.

== Composition ==
The YBNL phrase is, in itself, a paradox. Olamide wants to be fly like a "Yahoo Boy" but doesn't want to be associated with sending scam emails. The album's lyrics focus primarily on his love for God and the streets that raised him. In "Jesu O’ Kola", he looks to God for support because he believes the music industry castigated him. In the Church-inspired track "Jale", Olamide thanked God for preventing him from stealing. In "Voice of the Streets", he raps about his ambition to blow and about the passion and energy that young hustlers like himself possess. In "Street Love", he is reminiscent of his humble upbringing in Bariga. In "Money", Olamide talks about his constant quest for paper chasing. In "Fucking with the Devil", he said he's not born again but can hear angels calling.

== Critical reception ==
Professional ratings
Review scores
Source	Rating
TayoTV	8/10
Hi-Life Magazine	7/10
Nigerian Entertainment Today	3.5/5 stars

YBNL received generally positive reviews from music critics. Tayo Ayomide of Nigerian Entertainment Today awarded the album 3.5 stars out of 5, applauding Olamide for "emerging from the shadows of a hit-making producer and a late Nigerian rap legend to stand in the spotlight and boldly show us what Nigerian rap has been missing for a while–the heartbeat of the streets." TayoTV's Amb Noni granted the album 8 out of 10, praising its rhymes and Olamide's delivery. Hi-Life Magazine assigned a rating of 7 out 10, commending the tracks "First of All" and "Stupid Love".

=== Accolades ===
YBNL won Best Rap Album and Album of the Year at The Headies 2013.

== Track listing ==
No.	Title	Writer(s)	Producer(s)	Length
1.	"Money"	Olamide Adedeji	Pheelz	2:08
2.	"Fucking with the Devil"	Adedeji	Pheelz	4:03
3.	"Lights in the Air" (featuring Buckwyla)	Adedeji; Emmanuel Woko	Pheelz	4:53
4.	"Jale"	Adedeji	Pheelz	3:07
5.	"Voice of the Street"	Adedeji	Tyrone	3:50
6.	"Panumo" (featuring Davido)	Adedeji; David Adeleke	I.D Cabasa	3:49
7.	"Street Love" (featuring Minus 2)	Adedeji; Minus 2	Pheelz	3:49
8.	"Picture"	Adedeji	I.D Cabasa	4:16
9.	"Owotabua"	Adedeji	Pheelz	3:31
10.	"Fuji House" (featuring Dammy Krane)	Adedeji; Oyindamola Emmanuel	Pheelz	4:00
11.	"Ilefo Illuminati"	Adedeji	2Kriss	4:35
12.	"Remember" (featuring Kay Switch)	Adedeji; Kehinde Oyebanjo	Pheelz	3:47
13.	"Nyarinya"	Adedeji	Pheelz	3:15
14.	"Ewo Idi"	Adedeji	Pheelz	3:12
15.	"Stupid Love"	Adedeji	Samklef	3:47
16.	"Jesu O Kola"	Adedeji	Pheelz	4:03
17.	"Emotional Blackmail" (featuring Kida Kudz)	Adedeji; Olukayode Odesanya	Pheelz	4:59
18.	"International Local" (featuring Tiwa Savage)	Adedeji; Tiwatope Savage	I.D Cabasa	4:40
19.	"First of All"	Adedeji	Pheelz	3:06
20.	"Industreet (Cypher)" (featuring Reminisce and Base One)	Adedeji; Remilekun Safaru; Isaac Sotunde	Pheelz	6:14

== Personnel ==
- Olamide Adedeji – primary artist
- Tiwatope Savage-Balogun – featured artist
- Oyindamola Emmanuel – featured artist
- David Adeleke – featured artist
- Olukayode Odesanya – featured artist
- Remilekun Safaru – featured artist
- Isaac "Base One" Sotunde – featured artist
- Emmanuel "Buckwyla" Woko – featured artist
- Minus 2 – featured artist
- Phillip "Pheelz" Moses – producer
- Samuel "Samklef" Oguachuba – producer
- Olumide "I.D Cabasa" Ogunade – producer
- Raphael Christopher and Moses Christoper – producer
- Triumph "Tyrone" Grandeur – producer

== Release history ==
Release history and formats for YBNL
Region	Date	Format	Label
Worldwide	12 November 2012	CD	YBNL
Various	24 June 2013	Digital download	YBNL
