= Sunkanmi =

Nigerian singer and songwriter

- Born: Olasunkanmi Rehanat Alonge; 2 June 1987 (age 39); Lagos State, Nigeria
- Education: Olabisi Onabanjo University
- Occupations: singer-songwriter, vocalist
- Years active: 2013–present
- Musical career
- Genres: Pop, Afro pop, Afro hip hop

Olasunkanmi Rehanat Alonge (born 2 June 1987), better known by her stage name Sunkanmi, is a Nigerian songwriter and singer; Sunkanmi rose to recognition in 2015 when she released "For Body", a song which had her enlisting the collaborative effort of a popular Nigerian musician by name Olamide. She is currently signed to Hit The Ground Records under which she has released numerous singles.

== Early life and education ==
Sunkanmi is an alumna of Olabisi Onabanjo University, where she studied Geophysics.

== Musical career ==
While in her second year in school, Sunkanmi had her first recording. In mid-2015, through the help of her producer, she got to meet Olamide. The meeting led to the creation of a song titled For Body. Sunkanmi signed on with Hit The Ground Running Entertainment.

In 2015, Sunkanmi was nominated for the "Most Promising Act to Watch" at the 2015 edition of the Nigeria Entertainment Awards, and in 2016, she received 3 nominations from Scream All-Youth Awards in the "Best New Act" category, The Lagos Fashion Award in the "Fashionable Revelation Artist of the Year" category and Eloy Awards in the "Upcoming female Music Artiste" category, alongside the likes of Niniola, Falana and Aramide.

== Discography ==
=== Singles ===
List of singles as lead artist, showing year released and album name

Year	Title	Album
2013	"Fabulous"	Non-album single
2014	"Owo"	Non-album single
2014	"Cassanova"	Non-album single
2014	"Tenumo"	Non-album single
2015	"Singale"	Non-album single
2015	"For Body"	Non-album single
2015	"Marry Jonna"	Non-album single
2016	"Follow You Go"	Non-album single
2017	"Everywhere"	Non-album single
2017	"You"	Non-album single
2018	"Zobo"	
2019	"Never Finish"	
2019	"Baby Wa"	
2019	"Hold Me"	
2020	"Yur Luv"	

=== Music videos ===
List of music videos as lead artist, showing date released and directors

Title	Video release date	Director(s)	Ref
Cassanova	March 2014	Patrick Elis	
Owo	November 2014	Toyin Lawani	
Singale	January 2015	Aje Films	
For Body^{(featuring Olamide)}	July 2015	Unlimited L.A	
Marry Joanna	October 2015	Micheal Williams	
Everywhere	May 2017	Matt Maxx	
You	October 2017	Vasco Gee	
Zobo	July 2018	Prat Hanna	
Hold Me	December 2019	UjProFilms	

== Awards and nominations ==
Year	Award ceremony	Prize	Result
2015	City People Magazine Award	Most Promising Act to Watch	Nominated
2015	2015 Nigeria Entertainment Awards	Most Promising Act to Watch	Nominated
2016	Scream All-Youth Awards 2016	Best New Female Act	Won
2016	Lagos Fashion Awards 2016	Best New Female Act	Won
2016	Eloy Awards 2016	Upcoming music artist of the year	Won
