= 999 (EP) =

EP by Olamide
- Released: 9 February 2020
- Genre: Hip-hop; trap
- Length: 30:02
- Label: YBNL Nation
- Producer: Olamide; Pheelz; ID Cabasa; Eskeez; Cracker Mallo

Olamide chronology
YBNL Mafia Family (2018)	999 (2020)	Carpe Diem (2020)

999 is the first extended play by Nigerian rapper Olamide. It was released on 9 February 2020 by YBNL Nation, and features guest appearances from Phyno, Cheque, Rhatti, Snow, Jayboi, Jackmillz, Sosa-E, and Milly (Olamide's son). The EP's production was handled by Olamide, Pheelz, ID Cabasa, Eskeez, and Cracker Mallo. It serves as a follow-up to the YBNL collaborative album YBNL Mafia Family (2018).

== Background ==
Olamide announced the release of the EP on 9 February 2020. He stated that it would premiere at 9pm across 9 radio stations.

== Critical reception ==
999 received mixed reviews from critics. Motolani Alake of Pulse Nigeria described 999 as "anti-climactic" and said Olamide had a "below-par 2019", adding it felt "excessively built in Olamide's image and likeness". He concluded it suffered from "execution and imbalance" and gave it a rating of 5.5/10. Tomiwa of tooXclusive said 999 "won't stand the test of time" because fans had "moved on from Olamide the Rapper" to his pop era. He added that it "sounds weak and wouldn’t be appreciated", was "just a point above average" and felt like an "average project"; he rated the EP 6/10.

In a review for the Culture Custodian, Wale Oloworekende characterized 999 as "mostly, unabashedly hip-hop" but criticized it for being "scattergun without an overarching focus". He added that it "suffers from a lack of cohesion" despite strong guest moments, and concluded it was "a pleasant welcome to act two". Emmanuel Esomnofu, writing for NotjustOk, wrote that despite occasionally "throw[ing] things off course", it was "ambitious" with "a sexy concept". Reviewing for The Lagos Review, Dami Ajayi said 999 "has a cop-out in its length and duration" and "feels like a compilation album rather than body of work", adding that "not much has changed" in Olamide's music. He concluded that it "999 is definitely not an incline. It is at best a plateau".

== Track listing ==
999 track listing
No.	Title	Writer(s)	Producer(s)	Length
1.	"No Time"	Olamide Adedeji	Olamide; Eskeez	3:10
2.	"Warlords" (featuring Snow, Phyno, Cheque and Rhatti)	Adedeji; Snow; Chibuzor Azubuike; Arize Armstrong	Pheelz	3:27
3.	"Billion Talk" (featuring Milly)	Adedeji	Pheelz	3:02
4.	"Dance with the Devil" (featuring Sosa-E and Jackmillz)	Adedeji; Eseosa Ohuoba; Adelana Ayodele	Eskeez	3:37
5.	"Wonma!"	Adedeji	Cracker Mallo	2:54
6.	"Demons" (featuring Jackmillz)	Adedeji; Ayodele	Eskeez	3:05
7.	"Mojo" (featuring JayBoi)	Adedeji; Ayeni Sunday	Cracker Mallo	3:24
8.	"Prophesy"	Adedeji	Eskeez	2:53
9.	"Rich & Famous"	Adedeji	ID Cabasa	4:30
Total length:				30:02

== Personnel ==
- Olamide – primary artist, production (1)
- Snow – featured artist (2)
- Chibuzor "Phyno" Azubuike – featured artist (2)
- Akinbi "Cheque" Brett – featured artist (2)
- Arize "Rhatti" Armstrong – featured artist (2)
- Batifeori "Milly" Adedeji – featured artist (3)
- Eseosa "Sosa-E" Ohuoba – featured artist (4)
- Adelana "Jackmillz" Ayodele – featured artist (4, 6)
- Ayeni "JayBoi" Sunday – featured artist (7)
- Eskeez – production (1, 4, 6, 8)
- Pheelz – production (2, 3)
- Cracker Mallo – production (5, 7)
- ID Cabasa – production (9)
- STG – mixing, mastering
- DUKS Arts – artwork
