= Fave (singer) =

FAVE
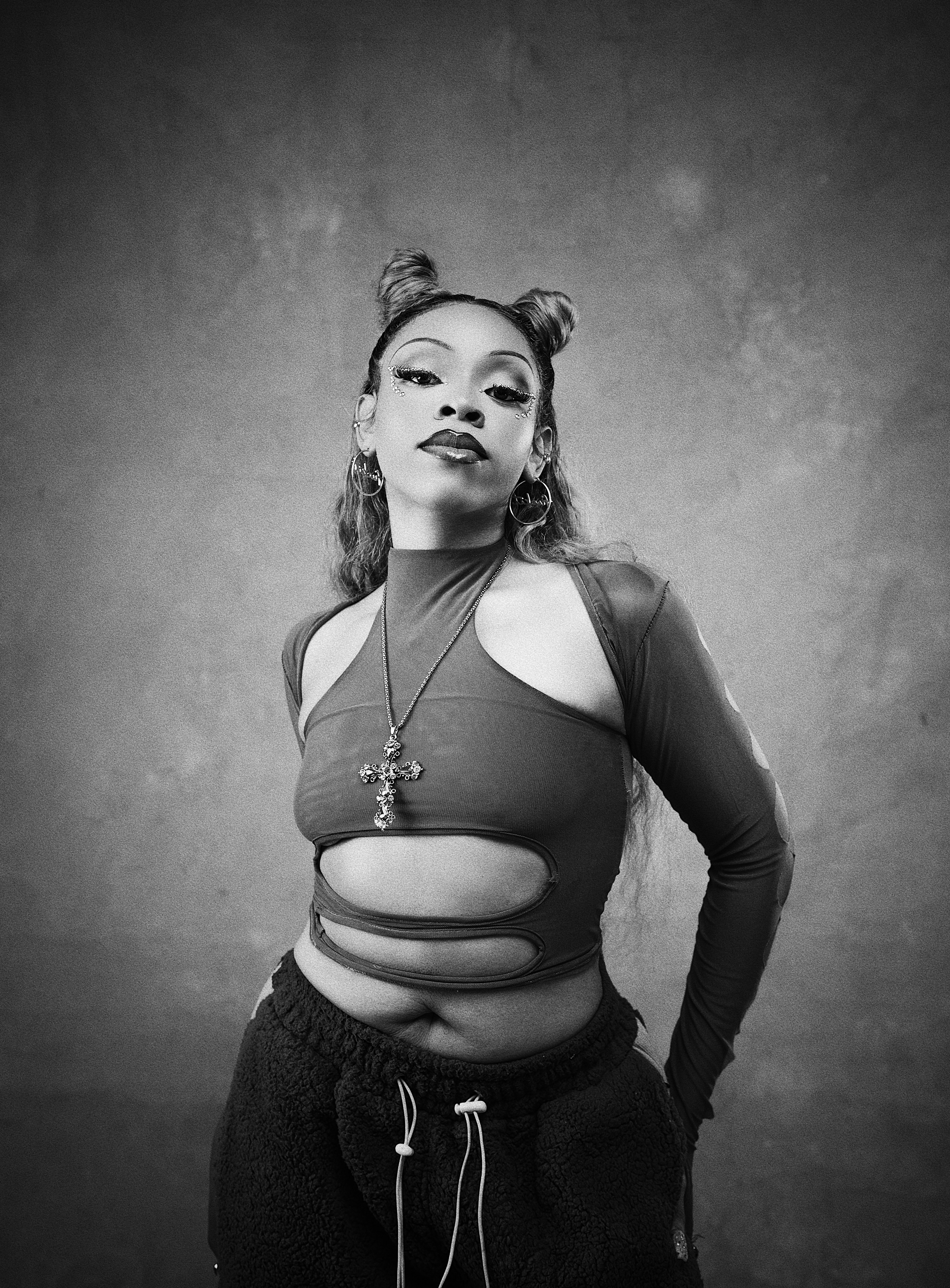
- Fave in 2024

Background information
- Born: Chidozie Godsfavour Ugochinyere; 13 March 2000 (age 26); Anambra State, Nigeria
- Genres: Afrobeats; dancehall; afro pop; R&B
- Occupations: Singer; songwriter
- Years active: 2019–Present
- Label: Tumblar

Chidozie Godsfavour Ugochinyere (born 13 March 2000), known professionally as Fave, is a Nigerian singer-songwriter and recording artist. She gained recognition after releasing several minute-long videos on Twitter during the COVID-19 lockdown. In 2022, she won Rookie of the Year at The Headies 2022 and was nominated for Most Promising Artist and Best Artist in African Reggae, Dancehall at the All Africa Music Awards. Moreover, she was nominated for Best New Artiste at the 2022 Soundcity MVP Awards Festival.

== Background and career ==
As a middle child and only daughter of the Chidozie family, a household of 5 who resided in eastern and southwestern Nigeria over the last two decades, Fave began her musical journey in church at the age of six. Just before she rose to stardom in 2020, Fave (coined from Favour) was just a 19-year-old singer-songwriter pursuing a law degree belted with only one single M.O.M.M.S which stands for Me or Mask My Sins. She is a graduate of law from Obafemi Awolowo university in Ile-Ife, Osun State, Nigeria.

Although her career has seen her dabble around genres including dancehall, Afro pop, Afro beats, Dane, R & B, Fave largely considers herself a "pop" girl. Her poetic approach to writing prioritizes vulnerability accompanied by vivid plots conveying a wide range of emotions often layered on groovy beat-drops or high-tempo drum progressions.

In 2019, while studying for a Law degree in South-western Nigeria, she posted several freestyles on her Twitter account which was instrumental in bringing her into the spotlight. She started gaining traction after her verse on Jinmi Abdul's produced free beat became an internet sensation specifically on Twitter where she got a lot of positive feedback from the public. Fave went on to release her official debut single N.B.U meaning "Nobody but U" on the 17th of April 2020 debuting number 64 on Apple music Top 100 charts. Months later she subsequently signed a year-long licensing deal with Mr Eazi's emPawa Africa in November 2021 . Fave rose to stardom after the release of her most popular single "Baby riddim" released under emPawa Africa .

The single "Baby riddim" became the number 1 song in Nigeria on turntable chart making it the second entry by a lead female artiste to reach number 1 in Nigeria on turntable chart, the single was also the number 1 Global Shazam Afrobeats record for 6 weeks consecutively in 2021.

Fave released her debut EP titled ‘Riddim 5’ which dropped on Thursday January 20, 2022. The EP includes five solo tracks – Obsessed, S.M.K, Kilotufe, Mr. Man, and her most successful hit, Baby Riddim. The EP became the first 2022-released project to go number 1 on Apple Music Top albums chart in Nigeria. Nigerian rapper Olamide featured Fave on two tracks "Want" and "Pon Pon" in his UY Scuti album released in 2021.

Nigerian singer Simi featured Fave on her single titled "loyal" released in 2022. She was later featured on the track 'kante' off Davido's album Timeless which was released March 2023, a song in which she delivered a powerful chorus with her vocals playing a major role in it.

On November 7, 2024, Fave released her sophomore EP titled DUTTY LOVE. The seven-track project includes previously released singles – "Belong To You", "Controlla", and "No Games" – alongside four new tracks: "Juju", "Complicated", "Lose My Mind", and the title track "Dutty Love". The EP explores themes of toxic love and self-discovery, blending Afrobeats, R&B, amapiano, and drill influences. DUTTY LOVE debuted at number 5 on Apple Music Top albums chart in Nigeria and charted in 13 countries globally.

== Discography ==
Fave discography
- EPs: 2
- Singles: 6
- Music videos: 3
- Mixtapes: 0
- Remix albums: 0

EPs

- Riddim 5 (2022)
- DUTTY LOVE (2024)

Singles

Title	Year	Album
"Momms"	2019	Non-album single
"Dal"	2020	Non-album single
"Beautifully"	2021	Non-album single
"Baby Riddim"	2021	Non-album single
"Scatta Scatta"	2022	Non-album single

As featured artist

List of guest appearances, with year released, other artist(s), and album name shown
Title	Year	Other artist(s)	Album
"Drama"	2020	Dimeji	Tales of the Calm & Spirited
"Want"	2021	Olamide	UY Scuti
"Pon Pon"	2021	Olamide	UY Scuti
"In Love"	2022	Ajebo Hustlers	Bad Boy Etiquettes 101
"Loyal"	2022	Simi	To Be Honest
"Play"	2022	T.I Blaze	El Major
"Kante"	2022	Davido	Timeless
"Fight for Us"	2023	Masika	Generation of Kings
"Cold War"	2024	Llona	Homeless

Music Videos

List of music videos, showing year released and director
Title	Year	Album	Director(s)
"Beautifully"	2021	Non-album single	Clarence Peters
"Baby Riddim"	2022	Riddim 5	Alien
"Mr. Man"	2022	Riddim 5	Two Brothers

== Awards and nominations ==
Award	Year	Recipient(s)	Category	Result	Ref.
All African Music Awards	2022	Herself	Most Promising Artist	Nominated	
All African Music Awards	2022	Herself	Best Artist in African Reggae, Dancehall	Nominated	
Soundcity MVP Awards Festival	2022	Herself	Best New Artiste	Nominated	
The Headies	2022	Herself	Rookie of the Year	Won	
The Headies	2023	Songwriter of the Year	Herself for (Simi - "Loyal")	Won	
