= Dandizzy =

Nigerian rapper, songwriter and producer

- Born: Daniel Tuotamuno Darius; 6 October 1996 (age 29); Port Harcourt, Rivers State, Nigeria
- Genres: Afro-fusion; Afrobeats
- Occupations: Rapper; Singer; Songwriter
- Years active: 2017–present

Daniel Tuotamuno Darius (born 6 October 1996), popularly known as Dandizzy, is a Nigerian rapper, singer and songwriter.

== Early life and career ==
Dandizzy is a native of Opobo in Port Harcourt, Rivers State, Nigeria. He started his music career in 2009 as a young rising artist, though he gained mainstream attention on 22 January 2017. He was signed to Cadilly Entertainment but left after two years. In August 2022, Regal Dry Gin made him an ambassador.

== Discography ==
- Mbong feat. Bella Shmurda
- Sote feat. Falz
- Denge Pose ft. Bad Boy Timz
- Who Goes Der
- Woskey
- Money feat. Dice Ailes
- Yawa feat. Skales
- Bad Boy Szn

As featured artist

- Trust Issues (Mansa Coal feat Dandizzy)
- Want (Rage feat. Dandizzy)
- Wida You Remix (Abobi Eddieroll feat. DanDizzy & Kayswitch)
- Trips & Munchies (Chimy feat. Dandizzy & Dr Barz)
- Wetin No Good (Idahams feat Eltee Skhillz, Dandizzy)
- Armageddon (DJ Joenel feat. Dandizzy, Dr Barz & Ajebo Hustlers)
- For my Baby (Beekay feat. Angelika & DanDizzy)
- Miracle (King Jamal feat. DanDizzy, Dr Barz & Chockie)
- Logos Party (Logos Olori feat. DanDizzy)
- PH Confidential (Kaystyle feat. DanDizzy)
- Juggernaut (AKtheKING feat. DanDizzy)
- For You (Legendary Suni feat. DanDizzy)
- Loli (Da Chris feat. DanDizzy)
- Soft Play (DJ Blizz feat. DanDizzy)
- Burn (Angelika_belle feat. DanDizzy)
- I Pray (Pro-Mix feat. DanDizzy & Meyar)

== Awards ==
| Year | Event | Award | Result | Ref(s) |
|---|---|---|---|---|
| 2018 | Galaxy Music Award | Best Rap single | Nominated | |
| 2018 | Galaxy Music Award | Artist of the Year | | |
| 2019 | Galaxy Music Award | Artist of the Year | Won | |
| | Galaxy Music Award | Song Of The Year | Won | |
