= Cheque (singer) =

Nigerian rapper (born 1995)

- Also known as: Superboy Cheque
- Born: Akanbi Bamidele Brett; March 23, 1995 (age 31); Ondo State, Nigeria
- Genres: Hip hop; Afropop
- Occupations: Rapper; singer; songwriter
- Years active: 2015–present
- Label: Penthauze

Akinbi Bamidele Brett (born 23 March 1995), known professionally as Cheque, is a Nigerian rapper and singer. He rose to mainstream fame for his 2020 single "Zoom". In 2021, he won an award for Best Duo African HipHop at the All Africa Music Awards alongside Fireboy DML. He is currently signed to Phyno's Penthauze imprint.

== Early life ==
Cheque was born in Okitipupa, Ondo State, but grew up in Ondo Town, Ondo State. He attended Obafemi Awolowo University in Osun State where he studied Chemical Engineering and graduated in 2016.

== Career ==
While Cheque was still an undergraduate at the university, he started off as a musician using the stage name Kyle B. His genre of music was particularly Gospel hip hop.

Cheque attended the same school with the likes of Blaqbonez and others. During his music days as Kyle B, he worked on Hennessy Cypher (Part VI) featuring the likes of Dark Poet, Kursor, Blaqbonez, Toosleek, and Eclipse.

While garnering popularity on campus as Kyle B, he released an extended play (EP), titled Super Adventure Crew.

In February 2019, he was discovered by Phyno who immediately gave him a recording deal with Penthauze Music.

In March 2019, an introductory song, "Nyem Space" was released for Cheque which was a collaboration with one of the acts in the record label. Cheque's music style is an infusion of afrobeat into rap, trap, RnB, and other genres. During June while still very much marked under Penthauze Music, he dropped "Jekasoro" (a Yoruba word meaning "Let’s talk"), "Pain Away", and "Abundance".

The rave of the moment act became popular after being announced as a new act by Phyno via his social media platforms.

As Kyle B, also known as Cheque released his five track EP, S.O.O.N EP in 2015. It featured DML (Now Fireboy DML), Chinko Ekun and Zamora. In January 2019, he was officially signed onto Penthauze and he was on the collective track "Nyem Space", which also had Rhatti and Nuno, who Phyno also just signed at the time.

In February 2020, he was featured on the track "Warlord" in Olamide's 999 EP. In July 2020, he released his first EP in Penthauze music titled Razor which had the hit track "Zoom". He also did a remix of "Zoom" with Davido and Wale afterwards. In September 2021, Cheque featured Olamide in a single titled "LOML" (Love Of My Life) and later released his debut studio album Bravo on 24 September 2021.

== Discography ==
=== Albums and EPs ===
- S.O.O.N EP (2015)
- RAZOR EP (2020)
- Bravo (2021)

=== Selected singles ===
- Wave (2018)
- Energy (2019)
- Jekasoro (2019)
- Pain Away (2019)
- Abundance (2019)
- Zoom (2020)
- LOML (2021)

== See also ==
- Olamide
- Phyno
- Fireboy DML
- 999 (EP)
