= Finesse (Pheelz song) =

2022 single by Pheelz

Single by Pheelz featuring Bnxn
- Released: 3 March 2022
- Recorded: 2022
- Genre: Afro-fusion
- Length: 2:31
- Label: Riidiimacool
- Songwriters: Phillip Kayode Moses; Daniel Benson
- Producer: Miichkel

Pheelz singles chronology
"One Life" (2020)	"Finesse" (2022)

Music video
- "Finesse" on YouTube

"Finesse" is a song by Nigerian record producer Pheelz. It was uploaded on TikTok in February 2022 and commercially released on 3 March 2022, through Riidiimacool. The song was produced by Miichkel and features vocals from Nigerian Afro-fusion singer Bnxn. During its debut week, the record gained popularity across TikTok in Europe and America, with the #FolakeChallenge hashtag.

It was ranked at number one on TheCable's list of 10 TCL radio pick of the week, and number two on Music in Africa's top Afrobeats songs of 2022. On 2 March 2022, the song was premiered on BBC Radio 1Xtra by DJ Edu on the Destination Africa program. It debuted at number 131 on the Billboard Global 200, and at number 106 on the Billboard Global Excl. US chart.

== Background ==
In a conversation with Pulse Nigeria music author, Motolani Alake, Pheelz said, "I was hanging out in the studio with a newly signed producer, Miichkel (MikeGoCrazy) when he played the beat. So, I added the melody, lyrics, and layers to the chorus. The final sound was so good I had to share a snippet on TikTok and other social media platforms that same night." He added, "Buju (now. Bnxn) hit me up after seeing the video on TikTok, so I asked him for a verse and he came through!"

== Commercial performance ==
In its debut week, "Finesse" peaked at number ten on the US World Digital Song Sales chart, for the week of 19 March 2022. On 5 March 2022, the record peaked at number one in ten countries, including Dominica, Benin Republic, Cameroon, Gambia, Ghana, Kenya, Liberia, Malawi, Nigeria, Sierra Leone, Uganda, and charted on 36 other countries on Apple Music, including within the top 40 of the UK Apple Music chart. It debuted at number 131 on the Billboard Global 200, and at number 106 on the Billboard Global Excl. US chart.

"Finesse" debuted on Nigeria's Spotify Top 50 chart at number one, global Apple Music Top 100 at number forty, and was the most Shazamed song in the world on 8 March 2022. It debuted at number one on the TurnTable Top 50 chart, UK Afrobeats Singles Chart, and number fifty-two on the UK Singles Chart. The record also debuted at number nine on the TurnTable Top 50 Airplay on 15 March, and debuted on number forty-four on the TurnTable Top 50 Streaming Songs on 9 March 2022.

== Credits and personnel ==
- Pheelz – vocals, songwriting
- Bnxn – vocals, songwriting
- Miichkel – production

== Charts ==
=== Weekly charts ===
Weekly chart performance for "Finesse"
Chart (2022)	Peak position
France (SNEP)	85
Global 200 (Billboard)	131
Ireland (IRMA)	99
Netherlands (Single Top 100)	84
New Zealand Hot Singles (RMNZ)	31
Nigeria (TurnTable Top 50)	1
South Africa (RISA)	31
Suriname (Nationale Top 40)	1
UK Singles (OCC)	52
UK Indie (Official Charts)	7
UK Hip Hop/R&B (Official Charts)	28
US Afrobeats Songs (Billboard)	6
US Rhythmic (Billboard)	15
US World Digital Song Sales (Billboard)	10

=== Year-end charts ===
2022 year-end chart performance for "Finesse"
Chart (2022)	Position
US Afrobeats Songs (Billboard)	8

== Certifications ==
Certifications for "Finesse"
Region	Certification	Certified units/sales
Canada (Music Canada)	Platinum	80,000^{‡}
France (SNEP)	Platinum	200,000^{‡}
New Zealand (RMNZ)	Gold	15,000^{‡}
Nigeria (TCSN)	2× Platinum	200,000^{‡}
United Kingdom (BPI)	Gold	400,000^{‡}
United States (RIAA)	Gold	500,000^{‡}
^{‡} Sales+streaming figures based on certification alone.

== Release history ==
Release history and formats for "Finesse"
Region	Date	Format	Label	Ref.
Various	3 March 2022	Digital download; streaming	Riidiimacool	
