= Ikigai (EP) =

2024 EP by Olamide

EP by Olamide
- Released: 26 June 2024
- Genres: Afrobeats; hip-hop; dancehall; Amapiano; pop
- Length: 22:05
- Languages: Yoruba; English; Nigerian Pidgin
- Labels: YBNL Nation; Empire
- Producers: Semzi; Eskeez; Pheelz; Rami Beatz; Otis

Olamide chronology
Unruly (2023)	Ikigai (2024)	Olamidé (2025)

Ikigai / 生き甲斐 (Vol. 1) (Japanese: Reason for living; romanized: 生き甲斐) is the second EP by Nigerian rapper Olamide, released on 26 June 2024 by YBNL Nation. The EP features guest appearances from Netherlands-based Sabri, and current and former YBNL acts Asake, Young Jonn, Lil Kesh, Fireboy DML, and Pheelz. Its production was handled by Semzi, Eskeez, Pheelz, Rami Beatz, and Otis. It follows his 2023 album Unruly, and won Album of the Year at the African Entertainment Awards USA 2024.

== Background ==
In an interview with BET, Olamide revealed that the reason for the EP's title was to remind himself that he shouldn't give up on music.

== Critical reception ==
Adeayo Adebiyi of Pulse Nigeria described Ikigai as "another wholesome chapter in Olamide's legacy in Nigerian music as he delivers a project that shows just how in touch he is with the soundscape." He concluded "By displaying an admirable ability to evolve and having successfully shed off the pressure of chasing chart toppers while maintaining is star power, Olamide is a blueprint on how to age beautifully." He awarded it a 8.1/10. Abioye Damilare Samson, writing for the online music magazine Afrocritik, said that "Olamide flawlessly integrates Asian production elements with Afropop influences, crafting a novel and distinct auditory experience." The EP was awarded a 6.9/10 by Samson.

=== Accolades ===
Year	Awards ceremony	Award description(s)	Results
2024	African Entertainment Awards USA 2024	Album of the Year	Won

== Track listing ==
Ikigai track listing
No.	Title	Writer(s)	Producer(s)	Length
1.	"Metaverse"	Olamide Adedeji	Semzi	2:59
2.	"Uptown Disco" (with Fireboy DML and Asake)	Adedeji; Adedamola Adefolahan; Ahmed Ololade	Semzi; Eskeez	3:59
3.	"Makaveli"	Adedeji	Semzi	3:08
4.	"Knockout" (with Sabri)	Adedeji; Loubna Sabri	Semzi	3:32
5.	"Hello Habibi"	Adedeji	Ramii Beatz; Otis	2:16
6.	"Morowore"	Adedeji	Semzi	3:28
7.	"Synchro System" (featuring Pheelz, Young Jonn and Lil Kesh)	Adedeji; Phillip Moses; John Udomboso; Keshinro Ololade	Pheelz	2:43
Total length:				22:05

== Charts ==
Chart performance for Ikigai
Chart (2024)	Peak position
Nigerian Albums (TurnTable)	1
US World Albums (Billboard)	13

== Release history ==
Release history and formats for Carpe Diem
Region	Date	Format	Label
Worldwide	26 June 2021	Streaming; digital download	YBNL; Empire
United States	30 January 2025	Vinyl	YBNL; Empire
