= Rapsodi (Olamide album) =

Studio album by Olamide
- Released: 21 March 2011
- Recorded: 2011
- Genre: Hip hop, yoruba music
- Label: Coded Tunes

Olamide chronology
Rapsodi (2011)	YBNL (2012)

Rapsodi is the debut studio album by Nigerian rapper Olamide, released by Coded Tunes on 21 March 2011. The album features guest appearances from Pheelz, Wizkid, 9ice, Reminisce, I.D Cabasa, 2Phat, Adol, Ab1, Jumoke, Lord of Ajasa, B-Rank, Soul Joe, and Terry Da Rapman. It was nominated for Best Rap Album at The Headies 2012.

== Accolades ==
Rapsodi was nominated for Best Rap Album at The Headies 2012.

Year	Awards ceremony	Award description(s)	Results
2012	The Headies	Best Rap Album	Nominated

== Track listing ==
No.	Title	Length
1.	"I'm Going In" (featuring Pheelz)
2.	"Apa Ti Jabo" (featuring I.D Cabasa)
3.	"Emi Lo Mi" (featuring 2Phat)
4.	"Eni Duro"
5.	"Gapa"
6.	"Responsibility" (featuring Adol)
7.	"Jara On Top" (featuring Ab1)
8.	"Woman" (featuring Jumoke)
9.	"Kelegbe" (featuring Lord of Ajasa)
10.	"Dirty Rock" (featuring B-Rank)
11.	"Soundtrack of My Life" (featuring Soul Joe)
12.	"Lift Him High" (featuring I.D Cabasa)
13.	"Legendary Hustlers" (featuring 9ice and Reminisce)
14.	"Omo Toh Shan" (featuring Wizkid)
15.	"Fori Fori"
16.	"Boys Are Not Smiling" (featuring Terry Da Rapman)
