= UY Scuti (Olamide album) =

Studio album by Olamide
- Released: June 18, 2021
- Genre: Afrobeats, Pop rap
- Length: 28:06
- Label: YBNL Nation; Empire Distribution
- Producer: P.Priime; Eskeezondbeat

Olamide chronology
Carpe Diem (2020)	UY Scuti (2021)	Unruly (2023)

Singles from UY Scuti
- 1. "Rock" Released: May 14, 2021

Professional ratings
Review scores
Source	Rating
Pitchfork	6.3/10
Pulse.ng	7.9/10

UY Scuti is the ninth studio album by Nigerian rapper Olamide, released on June 18, 2021. It follows his 2020 album Carpe Diem.

== Background ==
On March 16, 2021, via his Instagram story, Olamide shared the cover art of his new album. On April 18, he announced the name and release date of the project. On June 9, also via his Instagram page, he released the track listing of the album, which features collaborations with Layydoe, Fave, Jaywillz and Phyno.

== Reception ==
Nigerian journalist Damilola Olufemi praised the album for its "solemn and meaningful lyrics" and described its "infusion of both Reggae and Afro-pop" as proof of Olamide’s versatility in the music industry.

== Track listing ==
UY Scuti track listing
No.	Title	Writer(s)	Producer(s)	Length
1.	"Need for Speed"	Olamide Adedeji	Eskeezondbeat, P.priime	2:45
2.	"Jailer" (featuring Jaywillz)	Adedeji; Jaywillz	Eskeezondbeat	3:42
3.	"Rock"	Adedeji	Eskeezondbeat	3:05
4.	"Julie"	Adedeji	Eskeezondbeat	1:57
5.	"Rough Up" (featuring Layydoe)	Adedeji; Layydoe	Eskeezondbeat	3:17
6.	"Want" (featuring Fave)	Adedeji; Fave	Eskeezondbeat	1:41
7.	"PonPon" (featuring Fave)	Adedeji; Fave	Eskeezondbeat	3:34
8.	"Cup of Tea"	Adedeji	Eskeezondbeat	2:05
9.	"Somebody" (featuring Phyno)	Adedeji; Phyno	Eskeezondbeat	3:20
10.	"So Much More"	Adedeji	Eskeezondbeat	2:40
Total length:				28:06

== Charts ==
Chart (2021)	Peak position
World Albums (Billboard)	12
US Heatseekers Albums (Billboard)	11

== Awards and nominations ==
Award	Year	Category	Result
African Entertainment Awards USA	2021	Album of the Year	Nominated
