= Synonym (disambiguation) =

A synonym is a word with an identical or very similar meaning to another word.

Synonym may also refer to:

- Synonym (taxonomy), a different scientific name used for a single taxon
- Synonym (database), an alias or alternate name for a table, view, sequence, or other schema objects in a database
- Synonyms (film), a 2019 film
- Synonym (album), a 2026 album by Meshell Ndegeocello

Synonymous may refer to:

- Synonymous substitution, an evolutionary substitution in a DNA sequence coding for a protein, such that the coded amino acid remains unmodified.
