= Agoha =

Nigerian songwriter

John Agoha, popularly known as Agoha, is a Nigerian songwriter, singer, and model from Imo State, Nigeria.

== Childhood and early career ==
Agoha started singing in the church choir while in Benin City at the age of ten. He studied International Relations and Diplomacy at the University of Benin (Uniben) and graduated in 2010. Four years before that, he participated in Star Quest, a music competition that produced the likes of KayCee and Asa, and emerged, alongside his group, a first runner up at the competition. He also emerged the runner-up at Music Jamboree, a South African Music Competition in 2007.

== Secular Music Career ==
Agoha, hit the limelight in 2010 after releasing his hit song, "Omalicha", which was followed by "Selense" and "Chokomilo", which featured popular Nigerian artiste Dammy Krane and directed by Award Winning Director Mattmax.

== Transition to Gospel Music ==
In 2016, Agoha was planning his American Tour when he received a calling to become a Gospel Artiste. According to him, a lot of revelations came from men and women of God about it, and he had to heed the call. Following that calling, he dropped a song titled, "Jehovah" in July, 2016. The song earned him a lot of airplay on Nigerian radio stations and performance at several top notch shows in Nigeria and outside the country. Some of the shows include, AY Live, Rhythm Unplugged, Nigeria Music Video Award (NMVA), Star Trek, The Yaw Show and Chronicles of Ushbebe. Agoha's songs are inspirational and stems from personal life experiences. He aspires to always bless people with his music and to spread the peace he has experienced from singing those songs.

== Discography ==
Secular Singles

- 2010: Omalicha
- 2010: Selense
- 2011: Chokomilo

Gospel Singles

- 2016: Jehovah
- 2017: Eledumare
- 2018: Ebube
