= Unruly (album) =

Studio album by Olamide
- Released: 9 August 2023
- Recorded: 2021–2023
- Length: 39:52
- Labels: YBNL Nation; Empire
- Producers: Niketaz; P.Priime; LNK; Eskeez; Bbanks; Alex Lustig; Magicsticks

Olamide chronology
UY Scuti (2020)	Unruly (2023)	Ikigai / 生き甲斐 (Vol. 1) (2024)

Singles from Unruly
- 1. "Trumpet" Released: 20 April 2023; 2. "New Religion" Released: 2 June 2023

Unruly is the tenth studio album by Nigerian rapper Olamide. It was released on 9 August 2023 by YBNL Nation and Empire Distribution, and features Rema, Asake, Fireboy DML, Bnxn and CKay. The album featured production from Niketaz, P.Priime, LNK, Eskeez, Bbanks, Alex Lustig, CKay and Magicsticks. Unruly was preceded by the singles "Trumpet" and "New Religion". The album serves as a follow-up to UY Scuti (2021).

== Background ==
The album was first set for release on 12 July 2023, when it was eventually delayed to 9 August 2023.

In an interview with Nandi Madiba on Apple Music's Africa Now Radio, Olamide discussed the reason for the delay of Unruly, it being the rise of Afrobeats during the year. He explained: "I've been on the ground, trying to put in work and get my stuff together because the new wave is so crazy right now and you just have to figure a way to be in tune with time, which is not easy, so I've been working on that for so long. That’s why it took me so long."

== Singles ==
The album's lead single "New Religion", features label signee Asake and was produced by Magicsticks and Bbanks. The song was released on 2 June 2023, alongside a music video directed by Jyde Ajala. The album's second single "Trumpet" features CKay and was released on 20 April 2023. The song was produced by P.Priime and CKay, with its release being accompanied by a Jyde Ajala-directed music vieo.

== Critical reception ==
Professional ratings
Review scores
Source	Rating
Afrocritik	7.4/10
The Native	7.4/10
NotJustOk	6.8/10
Pulse Nigeria	7.5/10

The album received generally positive reviews from critics. Adeayo Adebiyi of Pulse Nigeria described Unruly as a solid, pop-driven album where the artist embraced shapeshifting across genres, heavily influenced by younger collaborators like his label signee Asake. Despite its stellar production and sonic coherence, he felt the album struggled to retain Olamide's earlier rawness, making it less compelling for longtime fans. Adebiyi stated, "Olamide injected creativity through impeccable production but struggled to retain a compelling identity." The album received a total score of 7.5/10.

Betty Godson of NotJustOk described Unruly as a cohesive and experimental album where Olamide showcased his versatility while blending traditional Yoruba rap with contemporary sounds. She praised the album's sequencing, noting that "Olamide’s sequencing game was very strong on this album." While some tracks outshined others, the project offered a variety of themes and intricate production, with certain songs revealing their depth after multiple listens. The album received an overall rating of 6.8/10.

Patrick Ezema of Afrocritik highlighted Olamide's Unruly as a dynamic album that excelled through "sparkling production and honeyed vocalists," showcasing the artist's evolution rather than a return to his early street-focused style. Though some tracks lagged in execution, Olamide's versatility and ability to blend various genres kept the album engaging. The album was praised for its diversity and consistency, with Ezema noting that "Olamide’s dynamism was the album’s guiding light." The album received a rating of 7.4/10.

Music journalist Emmanuel Esomnofu's review of Unruly for the Native Magazine emphasized Olamide's growth as both an artist and a music executive, highlighting his enduring impact on the Nigerian music scene. He praised the album's cohesion and artistic depth, noting that Olamide seemed reinvigorated, crafting a project full of memorable moments and reflecting on his legacy. Esomnofu wrote, "‘Unruly’ was a cohesive album, but with the subtle shifts within its delivery, it was unarguably one of the most sterling projects of his career." He gave the album a rating of 7.4 out of 10.

== Track listing ==
Unruly track listing
No.	Title	Writer(s)	Producer(s)	Length
1.	"Celebrate"	Olamide Adedeji	Magicsticks	2:56
2.	"Jinja"	Adedeji	Eskeez	2:35
3.	"Problem"	Adedeji	Magicsticks	2:43
4.	"Gaza"	Adedeji	Eskeez	2:14
5.	"Doom"	Adedeji	Eskeez; Magicsticks	2:12
6.	"Trumpet" (featuring CKay)	Adedeji; Chukwuka Ekweani	P.Priime; CKay	3:08
7.	"Come Alive" (featuring Bnxn)	Adedeji; Daniel Benson	P.Priime	3:20
8.	"New Religion" (featuring Asake)	Adedeji; Ahmed Ololade	Magicsticks; Bbanks	2:33
9.	"Shibebe" (featuring Fireboy DML)	Adedeji; Adedamola Adefolahan	Eskeez	2:43
10.	"Mukulu" (featuring Rema)	Adedeji; Divine Ikubor	Alex Lustig; LNK; Niketaz	3:47
11.	"Hardcore"	Adedeji	Eskeez	2:16
12.	"Supplier"	Adedeji	Eskeez	2:33
13.	"Life Goes On"	Adedeji	Eskeez	2:19
14.	"No Worries"	Adedeji	Eskeez	2:19
15.	"Street Jam"	Adedeji	Eskeez	2:07
Total length:				39:52

== Personnel ==
- Olamide Adedeji – vocals, writer
- Adedamola Adefolahan – vocals, writer
- Ahmed Ololade – vocals, writer
- Divine Ikubor – vocals, writer
- Daniel Benson – vocals, writer
- Chukwuka Ekweani – vocals, writer, producer
- Alex Lustig – producer
- LNK – producer
- Nicola "Niketaz" Kollar – producer
- Adenola "Eskeez" Gabriel – producer
- Kareem "Magicsticks" Temitayo – producer, mixing engineer, mastering engineer
- Sunday "Bbanks" Shashamura – producer, mixing engineer, mastering engineer
- Peace "P.Priime" Oredope – producer, recording engineer
- Jaycen Joshua – mixing engineer, mastering engineer
- Mike Seaberg – mixing engineer, mastering engineer

== Charts ==
Chart performance for Unruly
Chart (2023)	Peak position
Nigerian Albums (TurnTable)	1

== Release history ==
Release history and formats for Unruly
Region	Date	Format	Label
Nigeria	9 August 2023	Streaming; digital download	YBNL Nation; Empire
