= Bad Boy Timz =

Nigerian musician (born 1999)

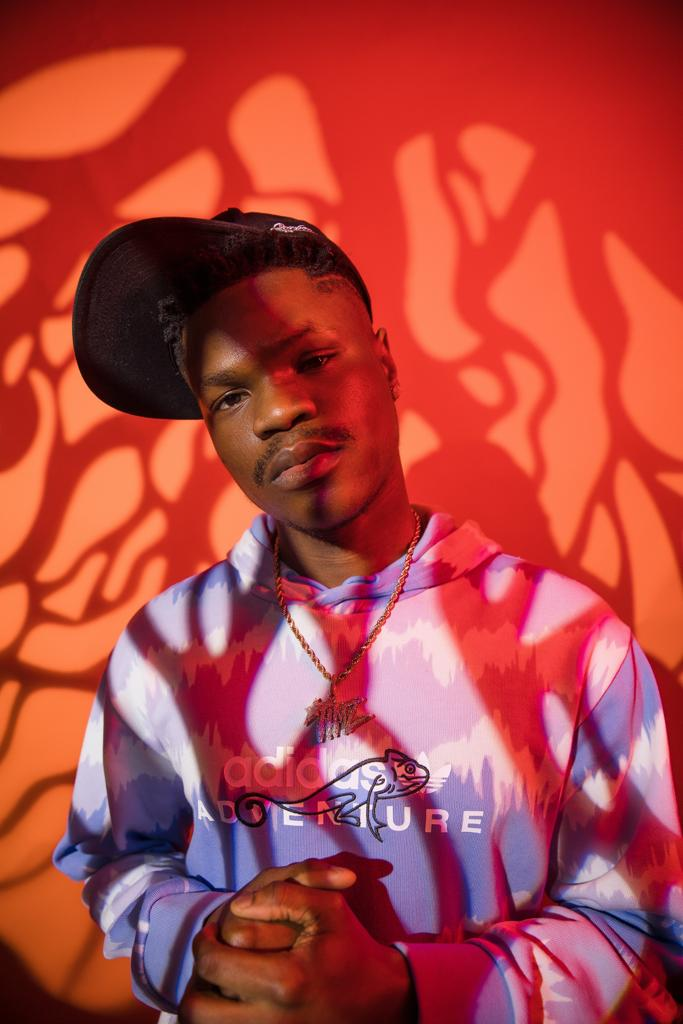

Background information
- Also known as: Bad Boy Timz
- Born: Olorunyomi Oloruntimilehin; 13 August 1999 (age 26); Lagos
- Genres: Afrobeats
- Occupations: Songwriter; singer
- Instrument: Vocals
- Years active: 2019 – present
- Label: Shock Absorbers Music

Olorunyomi Oloruntimilehin (born 13 August 1999) professionally known as Bad Boy Timz is a Nigerian singer and songwriter. He rose to prominence with the release of the song "MJ", and two separate follow-up remixes which featured Nigerian singer Mayorkun and Teni.

He was also featured in Olamide's hit single titled Loading off Carpe Diem winning the Rookie of the Year at The Headies 2020.

== Early life and career ==
In 2019, Bad Boy Timz skits and freestyles for which he received shout outs from industry giants (including J Hus) caught the eye of the Anonymous Record label, and early in 2019, he signed a deal with it.

In 2020, Bad Boy Timz graduated from the Bells University of Technology with a degree in Computer Engineering.

=== Record label dispute ===
On 24 May, Bad Boy Timz took to social media to share a scanned copy of a complaint he filed against his previous record label, Anonymous Music.

According to the legal document, disputes occurred between the two parties and after that his old label instigated his wrongful detention and that a video of the incident was taken and opted to cancel his contract with the record company due to the label's "breach of contract terms".

Bad Boy Timz said that his old label instigated his wrongful detention and that a video of the incident was taken. He founded the Shock Absorbers Music record label in May 2021. He also has a distribution deal with Empire label.

== Discography ==
=== EP ===
- Timz EP (2019)

=== Album ===
- No Bad Boy, No Party (2023)

=== Singles ===
Year	Title	Reference
2019	"Hustle"	
2019	"Complete Me"	
2020	"MJ"	
2020	"MJ Remix" (featuring Mayorkun)	
2020	"Have Fun"	
2020	"MJ Remix" (featuring Teni)	
2021	"Move"	
2021	“Oasis”	
2021	“Skelele” (featuring Olamide)	

=== As Featured ===
Year	Title	Producer	Album	Reference
2020	"Loading"(Olamide)	P.Prime	Carpe Diem	
2020	"Denge Pose" (Dandizzy)	Rage		
2021	"Complicationship"(Tanasha Donna)			
2022	"Faaji"(Blaqbonez & 1da Banton)			
2022	"Vibration"(Jerry Shaffer & Bella Shmurda)			
2024	“Grace” (Donny Crown)			

== Awards and nominations ==
Year	Event	Prize	Recipient	Result	Ref(s)
2020	City People Entertainment Awards	Best New Act	"Himself"	Won	
2020	The Headies, The Rookies	Rookie of the Year	"Himself"	Won	
2021	Net Honours	Most played Hip Hop song	"Loading" (Olamide featuring Bad Boy Timz)	Nominated	
