= Unlimited L.A =

Nigerian music video director (born 1985)

Background information
- Born: Buari Olalekan Oluwasegun; 2 April 1985 (age 41); Lagos, Nigeria
- Occupations: cinematographer, editor, colorist, music video director
- Years active: 2011–present

Buari Olalekan Oluwasegun (born 2 April 1987) professionally known as Unlimited L.A, is a Nigerian music video director.founder & creative director MSAYC Entertainment and Unlimited L.A, a production company that specializes in high-impact music videos, film/TV IP, commercial advertising, and visual branding. He was ranked among the Greatest Afrobeats Music Video Directors Of The 21st Century by TurnTable his legacy is described as the visual identity of Nigerian music both locally and internationally.

he has worked extensively with Wizkid, Davido, Burna Boy, Tiwa Savage, Bella Shmurda, 2Baba, Phyno, Timaya, Mr. P, Rudeboy, Don Jazzy, YBNL, DMW, Mavin Records, and more..In addition to music videos, Unlimited LA has directed commercial and digital video campaigns for Samsung Galaxy, Cosmo Product, Essenza, Lipton Ice Tea, Aquafina, Desperado, Oraimo and Pepsi.

== Early life ==
Buari Olalekan Oluwasegun was born on April 2, 1987, to the family of Mr. and Mrs. Buari in Lagos State, Nigeria. He is a cousin to the Ace Music Video director DJ Tee

== Career ==
Since 2011, he has worked for many musical artists in directing their music video and Professional directing and production experience in United States, United Kingdom, South Africa, United Arab Emirates, Kenya, Congo, Ghana and Senegal and Influencer and ambassador collaborations with global tech and electronics brands such as Tecno Camon 17 & Camon 18, Hollyland, Atomos Shogun, Omaha Electronics.

In 2015, he won Best Director at the 2015 Nigeria Entertainment Awards, and won Best Music Video at The Headies 2015, and also earned a nomination at All Africa Music Awards.

He became active during the early development of Nigeria’s contemporary music video industry and has worked on visual projects for Nigerian recording artists over the course of his career.His work has contributed to the development of music video production in Nigeria, particularly during a period when the country’s music industry was expanding and music videos became an increasingly important part of the promotion and presentation of Nigerian music. In addition to directing music videos, Unlimited LA has directed commercials and other branded visual content. Throughout his career, he has received recognition through awards and nominations associated with the Nigerian entertainment and music industry. His body of work covers different periods of the development of Nigerian music visuals, from the early growth of the industry to its more established contemporary landscape.

In 2016, he was nominated at The Headies 2016 and 2016 Nigeria Entertainment Awards for Best Music Video.

In 2017, he won Best Director of the year at the City People Entertainment Awards

In 2018, Unlimited L.A. won Video Director of the Year at The Beatz Awards 2018 for directing Olamide’s hit song "Science Student" In 2022, he was credited among Afrobeats unsung heroes that helped music videos reach new heights while also breaking the barrier of foreign misconceptions about how Afrobeats is visually represented.In 2023 he was listed among top 10 best music video directors in Nigeria 2023 by the Nigerian Tribune

In 2026, He was ranked among the Greatest Afrobeats Music Video Directors Of The 21st Century by TurnTable

== Television and film ==
Unlimited L.A. made his television debut as the director of Rise Again, a six-episode Nigerian drama series featuring Liquorose, Hermes Iyele, Kaffy, Toluwanimi George, Saint Toni, KoKoByKhloe and Femi Branch. The production marked his move from music video direction into episodic television.

He also directed I No Be Ashawo (I Am Not a Prostitute), a 15-minute Nigerian short film written by Chinemelum Okoabu and starring Nancy Isime. The socially themed drama was selected for screening at the All Africans Indie Film Festival (AAIFF) and received an international selection at the Brixton Film Festival in the United Kingdom through an AAIFF partnership. It was also screened at Film in the Park (FLIP 3.0).

== Videography ==
Year	Title	Artist(s)	Ref(s)
2011	"Rainbow"	Black Magic	
2012	"Repete"	Black Magic	
2013	"Turn Me On"	Gee4 Feat. Skales	
2013	"Sho Lee"	Sean Tizzle	
2014	"Eleda Mi"	Olamide	
2014	"Story for the Gods"	Olamide	
2014	"Skelemba"	Olamide Feat. Don Jazzy	
2014	"Shoki Rmx "	Lil Kesh Feat. Davido, Olamide	
2015	"Eyan Mayweather"	Olamide	
2015	"Don't Stop"	Olamide	
2015	"Lagos Boys"	Olamide	
2015	"Falila Ketan"	Olamide	
2015	"Bow Down"	Timaya	
2015	"Sanko"	Timaya	
2015	"Katapot"	Reekado Banks	
2015	"Izzue"	Dammy Krane	
2016	"I Love Lagos"	Olamide	
2016	"Bahd Baddo Baddest"	Falz Feat. Olamide, Davido	
2016	"Woyo"	Timaya	
2017	"Wo!!"	Olamide	
2017	"Augment"	Phyno Feat. Olamide	
2017	"No Fake Love"	Lil Kesh	
2017	"Gbe Seyin"	Niniola feat. Yung6ix	
2018	"Poverty Die"	Olamide	
2018	"Science Student"	Olamide	
2018	"Motigbana"	Olamide	
2018	"Bam Bam"	Timaya Feat. Olamide	
2018	"To U"	Timaya	
2018	"Kom Kom"	Timaya	
2019	"Double Double"	Rudeboy Feat. Olamide, Phyno	
2019	"Woske"	Olamide	
2019	"Balance"	Timaya	
2019	"Good Time"	Dr SID	

== Commercials ==
- Essenza Beauty
- Galaxy Note 9
- Omaha Electronics
- Legend Extra Stout
- Gala
- Glo

== Awards and nominations ==
Year	Event	Prize	Recipient	Result	Ref(s)
2014	The Headies 2014	Best Music Video Director	"Joe El (Oya Now)" ^{[A]}	Nominated	
2014	tooXclusive Awards	Best Music Video Director	"Unlimited LA" ^{[A]}	Nominated	
2015	2015 Nigeria Entertainment Awards	Best Music Video of the year (Artist & Director)	"Awww" (Di'Ja)	Won	
2015	The Headies 2015	Best Music Video	"Reekado Banks (Katapot)" ^{[A]}	Won	
2015	Afrimma 2015	Best Music Video	"J Martins (Time is now)" ^{[A]}	Nominated	
2015	Maya Awards Africa	Best Music Video	Unlimited L.A	Won	
2015	tooXclusive Awards	Oscar Music Video Director	Unlimited L.A	Won	
2016	2016 Nigeria Entertainment Awards	Music Video Director	"Awww" (Di'Ja)	Won	
2016	The Headies 2016	Best Music Video	"D'Banj (Emergency)" ^{[A]}	Nominated	
2016	Maya Awards Africa	Music Video Director	Unlimited L.A	Won	
2017	City People Entertainment Awards	Music Video Director	Unlimited L.A	Won	
2018	Soundcity MVP Awards Festival	Video Of The Year	"Olamide (Science Student)" ^{[A]}	Nominated	
2018	The Beatz Awards 2018	Video Of The Year	"Olamide (Science Student)" ^{[A]}	Won	
