= ID Cabasa =

Nigerian music producer (born 1975)

ID CABASA
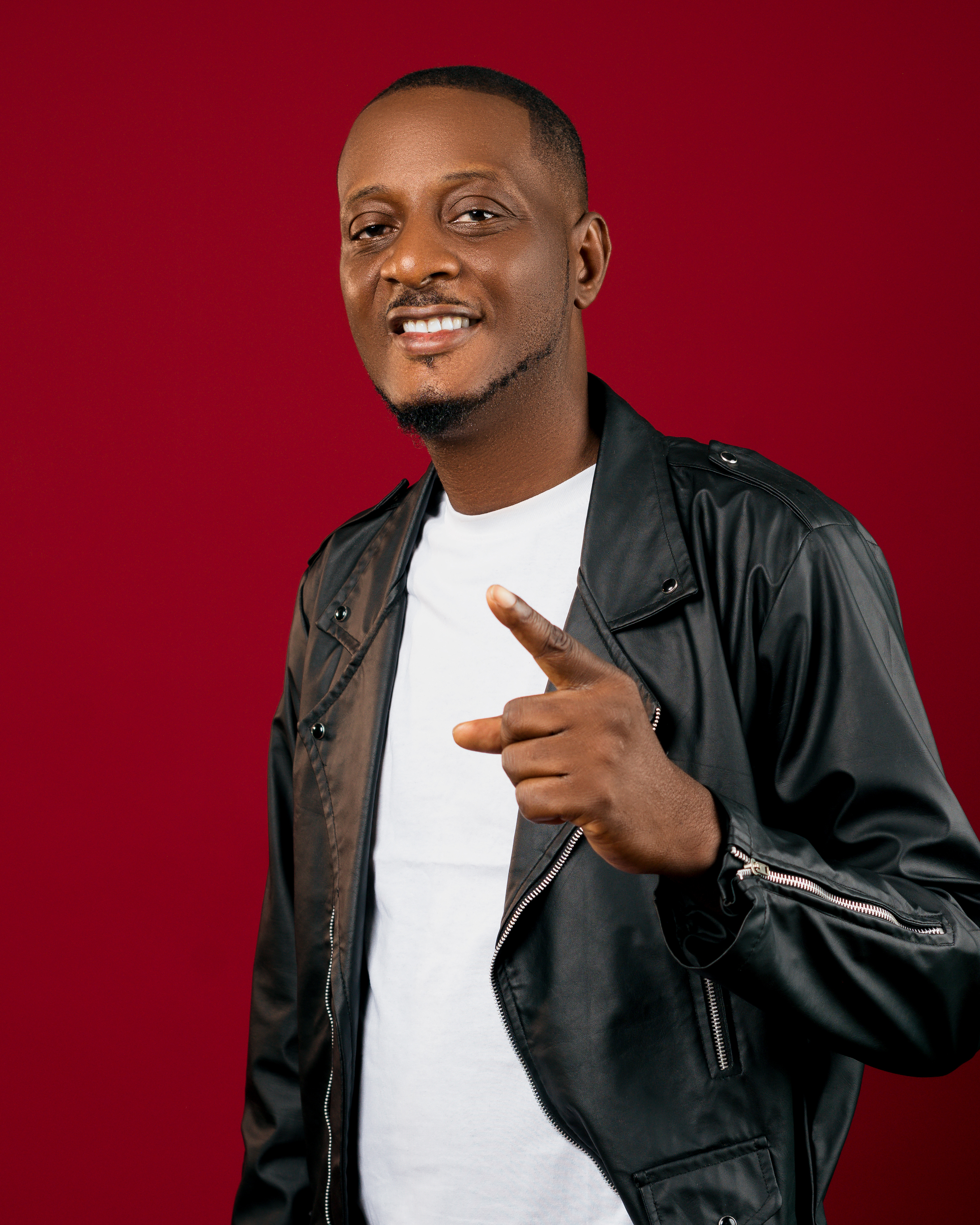

Background information
- Born: Olumide Ogunade; 29 July 1975 (age 50); Lagos State, Nigeria
- Genres: Afrobeats; Afropop
- Occupations: Record producer; record executive
- Years active: 1995–present
- Label: Coded Tunes Africa
- Spouse: Sijuade Ogunade (m. 2007)

Olumide Ogunade (born 29 July 1975) professionally known as ID Cabasa is a Nigerian music producer and singer. He is the founder of Coded Tunes, the record label that signed Olamide, 9ice, 2Shotz, Reminisce, Lord of Ajasa, Ajayi Brovas, 2Phat, Seriki and Banky W.

== Early life and education ==
ID CABASA was born Olumide Ogunade in Lagos, Nigeria, on 29 July 1975, he was the third child in a family of four, he started making music by the side as a teenager and a student in St Finbarrs college Akoka back in the late 80s in Afrodicia Record Studio formerly known as Peca, the studio that produced legendary artistes like the late Fela Anikulapo-Kuti, Ebenezer Obey, King Sunny Ade, Sir Shina Peters, Barrister, Onyeka Onwenu and others. He used to walk down to the studio to see how things were done, it’s was not far from his house in Akoka. To further his education, He went to the Lagos State University to study Economics then proceeded for his Master’s degree in Management Economics from the University of Lagos. Professionally, ID CABASA started making music in 2003 after he graduated from Lagos state university, he worked briefly in the banking sector before he left to fully focus on music production and he signed a couple artistes later under his label coded tunes with his partner, 2phat.

== Career ==
In 2002, ID Cabasa had formed the label Coded Tunes, then collaborated with 2phat, Lord of Ajasa and MC Spakoto form a clique called, The Smiling Head Soldier which was headed by 2phat. Furthermore, they had different music squads coming over to the studio to make music with them, this squad was massive at the time, and they were called, Yabtown Squad which was where Reminisce originated from. It was a clique of both rappers and singers and some of them were Cabasa’s juniors in secondary school. From vibing and creating music, they decided to create something larger than being a Smiling Head Soldier or Yabtown Squad, remembering the name of the studio that brought them together was Coded Tunes. So, that was how the label Coded Tunes started.

In December 2025, Cabasa released the album Unfinished Business. The project features collaborations with several artists, including T.I Blaze, Zlatan, Vector, 9ice, Pheelz, Olamide, Ayanfe, Bella Shmurda, Ayo Maff, Ajebo Hustlers, Darkoo, Dunnie, Lade, Liya, Kabex, Jaido P, Candy Bleakz, Islambo, Fireboy DML, Boj, Joeboy, FOLA, Shoday, Barry Jhay, Genie, Jaya, Trod, Kheengz, and Spydermanne. The album was produced entirely by Cabasa, with Kolade Dominate serving in an advisory A&R role.
