= Olamide =

Nigerian singer and producer (born 1989)

- Olamide in 2014
- Born: Olamide Gbenga Adedeji; 15 March 1989 (age 37); Bariga, Lagos State, Nigeria
- Other names: Young Erikina; Baddo
- Occupations: Rapper; singer; songwriter; record executive
- Years active: 2010–present
- Notable work: see Olamide discography
- Spouse: Adebukunmi Suleiman-Adedeji
- Musical career
- Genres: Afrobeats; hip-hop; street pop; Afro fusion; Nigerian hip hop; rap; cruise
- Instruments: Vocals
- Labels: YBNL Nation; Empire

YouTube information
- Channel: Olamide
- Subscribers: 1.4 million
- Views: 601 million
- Last updated: December 2025

Olamide Gbenga Adedeji (born 15 March 1989), known mononymously as Olamide, is a Nigerian rapper, singer, songwriter, and record executive. Olamide, who is regarded as one of the most influential artists in Nigeria and Africa, has been crucial to the creative and commercial success of several Afrobeats music stars. He records in Yoruba and English. In 2011, he released his debut studio album, Rapsodi, while signed to ID Cabasa's Coded Tunes. YBNL, his follow-up album, was released under his label imprint "Yahoo Boy No Laptop", also known as YBNL Nation. The album was supported by the singles "First of All", "Voice of the Street", "Stupid Love", and "Ilefo Illuminati". On 7 November 2013, he released his third studio album, Baddest Guy Ever Liveth. The album's singles include Durosoke" and "Yemi My Lover". On 17 July 2013, Olamide became the first Nigerian to sign an endorsement deal with Cîroc.

In November 2023, he received his first nomination at the 66th Annual Grammy Awards for the song "Amapiano" alongside his signee Asake making him one of the first Nigerian and African rappers to be recognised in that category. In 2025, Billboard magazine listed Olamide as one of its Global Power Players.

== Early life and musical beginnings ==
Olamidé Gbenga Adedeji was born in Bariga, Lagos State, on 15 March 1989. He is the second of Pa Adedeji's three children with Ronke Osisanya Adedeji, his second wife. TemmyGold and Eniola Olamilekan (also known as DJ Enimoney) are Olamide's two siblings.

Olamide started his career when he released the debut single "Eni Duro" in 2010 and "Omo To Shan" with Wizkid. In the same year, he performed at The Hip Hop World Awards. He studied mass communication at Tai Solarin University but dropped out due to financial problems.

== Music career ==
He was signed to ID Cabasa's Coded Tunes record label and was managed by Toni Payne. In 2012, he left Coded Tunes and started his record label, YBNL Nation.

=== 2011: Rapsodi ===
Olamide's debut album, Rapsodi was released in 2011. Its lead single, "Omo To Shan", charted on several radio stations in Lagos and across Nigeria. Olamide's debut offering led to collaborations with numerous artists, including Wizkid, ID Cabasa, 9ice, 2phat, Reminisce and D'banj.

=== 2012: YBNL ===
Adedeji's second studio album, YBNL, was released in November 2012. Its production was handled by Tyrone, Samklef, 2 Kriss, Pheelz, and ID Cabasa. The album features guest appearances from Davido, Tiwa Savage, Kayswitch, Dammy Krane, Reminisce, Samklef, Buckwylla, Minus 2 and Base One. It was supported by the singles "Ilefo Illuminati", "First of All", "Stupid Love", and "Voice of the Street".

=== 2013: Baddest Guy Ever Liveth ===
Baddest Guy Ever Liveth is Olamide's third studio album. It was released on 7 November 2013 by YBNL Nation, he recorded the album between 2012 and 2013 and enlisted Pheelz, Buckwyla, Ketchup, Ice Prince, Pepenazi, Endia, Viktoh, B.Banks, Phyno, Pele Pele and Bez to appear as guest artists on it. The album was produced entirely by Pheelz and plugged by Olaitan Salaudeen, except for the thirteenth track, "Sitting on the Throne".

Baddest Guy Ever Liveth was supported by four singles: "Durosoke", "Turn Up", "Yemi My Lover" and "Eleda Mi O". Premium Times newspaper included the album on its list of the five yet to be released Nigerian albums of 2013. It was ranked 12th on Afrikka Radio's list of the top 12 best Nigerian albums of 2013. Baddest Guy Ever Liveth won Best Album of the Year at the 2014 Nigeria Entertainment Awards, and was nominated for Rap Album of the Year at the 2014 City People Entertainment Awards. It won Best Rap Album and Album of the Year at The Headies 2014.

In May 2013, it was reported that Olamide had signed a record deal with DB Records. Olamide took to Twitter to debunk the reports. In an interview with Toolz on NdaniTV's The Juice, he said that it was "too late" for anyone to sign him.

=== 2014: Street OT ===
On 14 November 2014, Olamide released his fourth album, Street OT, through YBNL Nation. The album is a follow-up to his 2013 Baddest Guy Ever Liveth album. Preceded by the singles titled "Story for the Gods" and "Goons Mi", Street OT features guest appearances from Pasuma, Lil Kesh, Chinko Ekun, Phyno, Don Jazzy, and Reminisce. Its production was handled by Pheelz, B-Banks, and Young Jonn. The ideology of the title of the album is to glorify and show his love for the "streets", a word with which Olamide is synonymous with.

=== 2015: 2 Kings and Eyan Mayweather ===
Olamide collaborated with Phyno in 2015 to release 2 Kings. It was released through Cloud 9 and the iTunes Store with a little announcement on 1 April 2015 by Penthauze Music and YBNL Nation. The album features collaborations with producers and guest artists such as Wizkid, Lil Kesh, Storm Rex, Pheelz, Major Bangz, B.Banks and Young John. Before recording the album, Olamide and Phyno frequently collaborated on several songs, including "Ghost Mode" and "Dope Money". The album produced the singles "Une" and "Confam Ni", both of which were released in the months leading to the album's release.

Olamide's fifth studio album, Eyan Mayweather, was released on 23 November 2015. Released through YBNL Nation with studio production from Pheelz, Young Jonn, B Banks, and ID Cabasa, Eyan Mayweather is the follow-up to 2 Kings, a collaborative album by Olamide and Phyno. The album contains 21 tracks with no single feature.

=== 2016: The Glory ===
The Glory, Olamide's sixth studio album, was released on 23 December 2016. It was released through YBNL Nation with studio production from Pheelz. The album contains 16 tracks and features Phyno, Wande Coal, Burna Boy, Akuchi, and Davolee. The Glory is the follow-up to Eyan Mayweather.

=== 2020: 999 EP, joint venture deal with Empire and Carpe Diem ===
On 10 February 2020, Olamide released a surprise project, the EP 999 tooXclusive gave the project a 6/10 rating, while Motolani Alake of Pulse also gave a 5.5/10 review.

Olamide revealed to the public on 18 February 2020 that his record label, YBNL Nation, has signed a joint venture deal with an international distribution company Empire. He further stated that Fireboy DML and any new artist signed to YBNL Nation will join him to benefit from the deal. Olamide's eleventh album, Carpe Diem, was released on 8 October 2020. Carpe Diem contains 12 tracks and features Omah Lay, Fireboy DML, Peruzzi, Bad Boy Timz, Bella Shmurda and Phyno, with production by Young John, Pheelz, P.Priime, ID Cabasa and VStix.

=== 2021: UY Scuti ===
Olamide announced in March 2021 that he was done working on another album. On 18 April, he announced the album UY Scuti, which was released on 18 June. Olamide mentioned that his son was the inspiration for why he titled the album UY Scuti.

On 5 February 2022, Olamide hinted at retirement after the release of his 12th studio album.

=== 2023: Unruly ===
Olamide released his 10th studio album, Unruly, on 9 August 2023. The album features CKay, Asake, Bnxn, Rema and Fireboy DML.

=== 2024: Ikigai (生き甲斐) ===
Olamide announced on 26 June 2024 that he had completed work on a seven-track project titled Ikigai. The following day, he released "Project Ikigai" (生き甲斐) featuring collaborations with past and present artists signed to the YBNL record label such as Fireboy DML, Asake, Young John, Pheelz, and Lil Kesh.

=== 2025: Olamidé ===
On 18 June 2025, Olamide released his self-titled album Olamidé.

In April 2026, Olamide collaborated with singer Teni on the soulful single "Zion," released under Gamma Africa. That same month, during an interview with content creator Korty EO, Olamide spoke candidly about his ongoing stage anxiety during live performances, explaining that past incidents where aggressive fans unexpectedly snatched personal items such as his hat or jewelry had created lasting psychological tension before mounting the stage.

== Personal life ==
Olamide is married to Adebukunmi Aisha Suleiman. They have three children together, two boys, Batifeori Maximilliano Adedeji and Tunrepin Myles Adedeji, and a daughter, Mowaririfunoluwa Celine Adedeji. Media personality Maria Okanrende, who at the time worked at The Beat 99.9 FM has claimed to have a child with him.

== Discography ==
Studio albums

- Rapsodi (2011)
- YBNL (2012)
- Baddest Guy Ever Liveth (2013)
- Street OT (2014)
- Eyan Mayweather (2015)
- The Glory (2016)
- Lagos Nawa (2017)
- Carpe Diem (2020)
- UY Scuti (2021)
- Unruly (2023)
- Olamidé (2025)

Collaborative albums

- 2 Kings (with Phyno) (2015)
- YBNL Mafia Family (2018)

EPs

- 999 (2020)
- Ikigai (2024)

== Awards and nominations ==
Year	Event	Prize	Recipient	Result	Ref
2025	Billboard Music Awards	Global Power Player	Himself	Won	
2024	African Entertainment Awards USA	Album of the Year	Ikigai Vol. 1	Won	
2024	NAACP Image Awards	Outstanding International Song	"Amapiano" with Asake)	Nominated	
2023	66th Annual Grammy Awards	Best African Music Performance	"Amapiano" (with Asake)	Nominated	
2022	The Headies	Carpe Diem	Best Rap Album	Won	
2022	The Headies	Headies Viewer's Choice	"Infinity" (featuring Omah Lay)	Nominated	
2022	The Headies	Album of the Year	Carpe Diem	Nominated	
2022	The Headies	Best Male Artist	Himself	Nominated	
2022	The Headies	Best Rap Single	"Loading" (featuring Bad Boy Timz)	Nominated	
2021	All Africa Music Awards	Song of the Year	"Infinity" (featuring Omah Lay)	Nominated	
2021	All Africa Music Awards	Best West African Artiste (Male)	Himself	Nominated	
2021	All Africa Music Awards	Album of the Year	Carpe Diem	Nominated	
2021	Net Honours	Most Played Hip Hop Song	"Loading" (featuring Bad Boy Timz)	Nominated	
2021	Net Honours	Most Searched Musician (Male)	Himself	Nominated	
2020	Soundcity MVP Awards Festival	Listeners' Choice	"Oil & Gas"	Nominated	
2018	The Headies	Best Street-Hop Artiste	"Wo"	Nominated	
2018	The Headies	Best Rap Album	The Glory	Nominated	
2018	The Headies	Artiste of the Year	Himself	Nominated	
2018	The Headies	Song of the Year	"Wo"	Nominated	
2018	The Headies	Headies' Viewer's Choice	"Wo"	Nominated	
2016	Nigeria Entertainment Awards (NEAs)	Album of the Year	Eyan Mayweather	Won	
2016	Nigeria Entertainment Awards (NEAs)	Rap Act of the Year	Himself	Won	
2016	MTV EMA 2016	Best African Act	Himself	Nominated	
	MOBO Awards	Best African Act	Himself	Nominated	
2015	City People Entertainment Awards	Rap Artist of the Year	Himself	Won	
2015	City People Entertainment Awards	Artist of the Year	Himself	Won	
2015	African Muzik Magazine Awards	West Africa Artist of the Year	Himself	Won	
2015	The Headies	Best Street-Hop Artiste	Himself	Won	
2015	The Headies	Artiste of the Year	Himself	Won	
2015	The Headies	Best Pop Single	"Bobo"	Nominated	
2015	TooXclusive Awards	Certified Banger of the Year	"Bobo"	Won	
2015	TooXclusive Awards	Video Wonder of the Year	"Melo Melo"	Won	
2015	TooXclusive Awards	Artiste of the Year	Himself	Won	
2015	TooXclusive Awards	Male Artiste of the Year	Himself	Won	
2015	TooXclusive Awards	Best Street Hop Track	"Bobo"	Nominated	
2015	TooXclusive Awards	Best Street Hop Track	"Reggae Blues" (HarrySong featuring Olamide, KCee, Iyanya & Orezi)	Nominated	
2015	TooXclusive Awards	Best Street Hop Track	"Ladi" (Olamide & Phyno featuring Lil Kesh)	Nominated	
2015	TooXclusive Awards	Best Hip-Hop Track	"Local Rappers" (Reminisce featuring Olamide & Phyno)	Won	
2015	TooXclusive Awards	Mixtape of The Year	2 Kings (Olamide & Phyno)	Won	
2015	TooXclusive Awards	Album of the Year	Street OT	Won	
2014	The Headies 2014	Artiste of the Year	Himself	Nominated	
2014	The Headies 2014	Best Rap Album	Baddest Guy Ever Liveth	Won	
2014	The Headies 2014	Album of the Year	Baddest Guy Ever Liveth	Won	
2014	The Headies 2014	Best Rap Single	"Dope Money" (featuring Phyno)	Nominated	
2014	2014 Channel O Music Video Awards	Most Gifted West	"Turn Up"	Won	
2014	2014 Nigeria Entertainment Awards	Best Rap Act of the Year	Himself	Nominated	
2014	MTV Africa Music Awards 2014	Best Hip Hop	Himself	Nominated	
2014	City People Entertainment Awards	Musician of the Year (Male)	Himself	Nominated	
2014	City People Entertainment Awards	Rap Artiste of the Year	Himself	Nominated	
2014	City People Entertainment Awards	Most Popular Song of the Year	"Eleda Mi"	Nominated	
2014	City People Entertainment Awards	Rap Album of the Year	Baddest Guy Ever Liveth	Nominated	
2014	World Music Awards	World's Best Male Artist	Himself	Nominated	
2014	World Music Awards	World's Best Live Act	Himself	Nominated	
2014	World Music Awards	World's Best Entertainer of the Year	Himself	Nominated	
2013	Nigeria Music Video Awards	Video of the Year	"Durosoke"	Nominated	
2013	Nigeria Music Video Awards	Best Afro Hip Hop Video	"Durosoke"	Won	
2013	The Headies 2013	Song of the Year	"Durosoke"	Nominated	
2013	The Headies 2013	Best Street Hip-Hop Artiste	"Durosoke"	Won	
2013	The Headies 2013	Best Rap Single	"Durosoke"	Nominated	
2013	The Headies 2013	Best Rap Single	"Ghost Mode" (Phyno featuring Olamide)	Nominated	
2013	The Headies 2013	Artiste of the Year	Himself	Nominated	
2013	The Headies 2013	Lyricist on the Roll	"Voice of the Streets"	Nominated	
2013	The Headies 2013	Best Rap Album	YBNL	Won	
2013	The Headies 2013	Album of the Year	YBNL	Won	
2013	2013 Nigeria Entertainment Awards	Best Album of the Year	YBNL	Won	
2013	2013 Nigeria Entertainment Awards	Best Rap Act of the Year	Himself	Nominated	
2013	2013 Nigeria Entertainment Awards	Music Video of the Year	"Voice of the Street"	Nominated	
2013	2013 Nigeria Entertainment Awards	Best Indigenous Artiste	Himself	Won	
2013	2013 Nigeria Entertainment Awards	Best Collabo	"Ghost Mode" (Phyno featuring Olamide)	Won	
2012	The Headies 2012	Hip Hop World Revelation of the Year	Himself	Nominated	
2012	The Headies 2012	Best Rap Single	"Young Erikina"	Nominated	
2012	The Headies 2012	Best Rap Album	Rapsodi	Nominated	
2011	The Headies 2011	Next Rated	Himself	Nominated	

== See also ==
- List of Nigerian musicians
- List of Nigerian rappers
