= Pheelz =

Nigerian record producer and singer

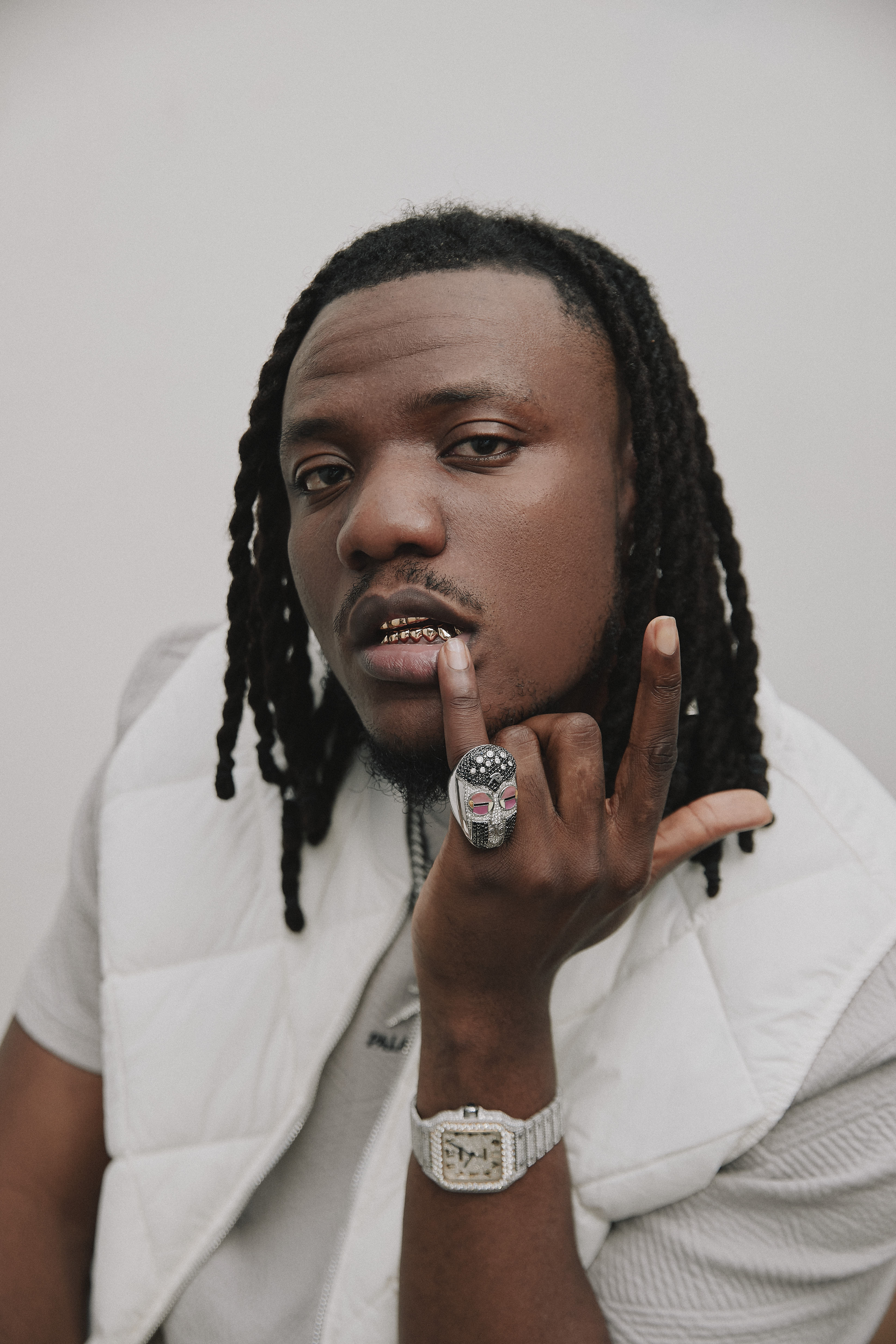

Background information
- Also known as: Pheelz, Pheelz Mr. Producer, Ridimakulayo
- Born: Phillip Kayode Moses; June 5, 1994 (age 32); Lagos, Nigeria
- Genres: Afropop; Afrobeats; African hip-hop; jazz; hip hop; R&B
- Occupations: Record producer, songwriter, singer
- Years active: 2011–present
- Labels: Rii Collective l; Warner Records US

Phillip Kayode Moses (born 5 June 1994), better known as Pheelz, is a Nigerian record producer, singer, songwriter, and graphic designer. Pheelz is credited to have produced all but one song on Olamide's Baddest Guy Ever Liveth album. In 2022, he had a hit with his song "Finesse", a collaboration with Bnxn (formerly known as Buju).

== Early life ==
Pheelz is a native of Ogun State, but he was born and raised in Ojo, a local government area in Lagos State. He started music as a 10-year-old singer in church. While in high school in Ajangbandi Afromedia, Pheelz attended Ideal Comprehensive High School and later he worked under I.D Cabassa at Coded Tunes, the record label where he met Olamide. In 2011, he featured vocals in a song off Olamide's Rapsodi album titled "I'm Going In".

== Career ==
=== 2012–2020: Working as a producer ===
His breakthrough as a record producer came in 2012, when he produced the chart-topping singles by Olamide titled "First of All" and "Fucking with the Devil" off his YBNL album. In 2013, Pheelz was listed in NotJustOk's "Top 10 Hottest Producers in Nigeria". He produced all but one song on Olamide's Baddest Guy Ever Liveth album, a move which made him gain grounds in the Nigerian music industry and won him a nomination at The Headies 2013. In 2014, he was also nominated in the Producer of the Year category at the 2014 edition of The Headies and at the 2014 Nigeria Entertainment Awards. Pheelz has gone on to produce and be credited in popular songs and albums including The Chairman by M.I, Ghetto University by Runtown and Seyi or Shay by Seyi Shay. In 2014, Pheelz collaborated with COPILOT Music and Sound on a cover of Carlinhos Brown's "Maria Caipirnha (Samba da Bahia)". The arrangement represented the musical instrumentation and styles of Nigeria for Visa's "Samba of the World", a digital campaign for the 2014 FIFA World Cup. Pheelz was nominated and won the "Producer of the Year" category at The Headies awards 2020 edition.

He has worked with several artists and musicians, such as Davido, Usher, Olamide, Wizkid, Fireboy DML, Teni and Tiwa Savage.

In July 2026, Pheelz produced "Constantly," a track on Nigerian singer Davido's sixth studio album, Oriadé, released on 31 July 2026. Premium Times described the song, on which Davido sings about "consistency, survival and success," as bearing Pheelz's "signature touch in its chorus cadence and closing electric guitar," calling it a personal testimony rather than a straightforward celebratory anthem.

=== 2021–present: Hear Me Out EP ===
In 2021 he released his debut EP Hear Me Out through Empire Distribution.

"One Life" was released as a single off the EP on 26 November 2020, with its lyric video following on 28 December 2020.

Motolani Alake of Pulse Nigeria wrote that it "excels on quality songwriting and good productions". Ikwuje Amos of Mp3bullet called Pheelz "very intentional on the EP".

On 15 March 2022, he signed a record deal with Warner UK, shortly after his single "Finesse" became an international success, and earned him, his first career entry on the Billboard Global 200 at number 131, the TurnTable Top 50 at number 1, World Digital Song Sales at number 10, UK Afrobeats Singles Chart at number 1, and the UK Singles Chart at number 52.

== Discography ==
Extended plays

- Hear Me Out (2021)
- Pheelz Good (2023)
- Pheelz Good (Triibe Tape) (2024)
- Pheelz Good II (2024)

Singles

List of singles as lead artist, with selected chart positions and certifications, showing year released and album name
Title	Year	Peak chart positions						Certifications	Album
Title	Year	NG	US Global	UK	UK R&B	UK Afrobeats	SA	Certifications	Album
"Hustle"	2012	—	—	—	—	—	—		Non-album singles
"Son of Abraham" (featuring Olamide)	2015	—	—	—	—	—	—		Non-album singles
"I.J.N"	2016	—	—	—	—	—	—		Non-album singles
"Do What You Want"	2016	—	—	—	—	—	—		Non-album singles
"Honey" (featuring Reekado Banks, and Marv)	2016	—	—	—	—	—	—		Non-album singles
"12:01 (ADM Remix)" (with Cina Soul)	2016	—	—	—	—	—	—		Non-album singles
"Gobe" (with Olamide, and Naira Marley)	2019	—	—	—	—	—	—		Non-album singles
"One Life"	2020	—	—	—	—	—	—		Non-album singles
"MOSLADO (Pheelz Remix)" (with Teni)	2021	—	—	—	—	—	—		Non-album singles
"Finesse" (with Bnxn)	2022	1	131	52	28	1	31	BPI: Silver	TBA
"Finesse" (with French Montana)	2022	—	—	—	—	—	—		Non-album single
"Ruin" (with Usher)	2024	—	—	—	—	—	—		Coming Home
"5AM in Ojo" (with Olamide)	2024	—	—	—	—	—	—		
"—" denotes a recording that did not chart or was not released in that territory.

== Awards and nominations ==
Year	Event	Prize	Recipient	Result	Ref
2013	The Headies 2013	Producer of the Year	Pheelz for "Durosoke"	Nominated	
2014	The Headies 2014	Producer of the Year	Pheelz for "Eleda Mi O"	Nominated	
2014	2014 Nigeria Entertainment Awards	Producer of the Year	Himself	Nominated	
2014	City People Entertainment Awards	Producer of the Year	Himself	Nominated	
2015	2015 Nigeria Entertainment Awards	Producer of the Year	Himself	Nominated	
2015	City People Entertainment Awards	Producer of the Year	Himself	Nominated	
2016	City People Entertainment Awards	Producer of the Year	Himself	Nominated	
2016	The Headies	Producer of the Year	Pheelz for "Pick Up"	Nominated	
2016	The Headies	Producer of the Year	Pheelz for "Love Lagos"	Nominated	
2020	The Headies 2020	Producer of the Year	Pheelz for "Billionaire by Teni"	Won	
2021	The Beatz Awards	Afro Hip Hop Producer of the Year	Himself	Nominated	
2021	The Beatz Awards	Afro Soul Producer of the Year	Himself	Nominated	
2023	Soundcity MVP Awards	Best Collaboration	Finesse	Won	
2023	The Headies	Producer of the Year	Electricity	Nominated	
2023	The Headies	Afrobeats Single of the Year	Finesse	Nominated	
2023	The Headies	Song of the Year	Finesse	Nominated	
