= Semzi =

Nigerian record producer and musician

- Also known as: Semzi Beatz, Semzi Bond
- Born: Banjo Oluwasemilogo Kayode; March 31, 2000 (age 26); Lagos State, Nigeria
- Genres: Afrobeats; pop; hip hop; contemporary R&B; Amapiano
- Occupations: Record producer; singer; songwriter
- Instruments: Keyboard; synthesizer; drum; shekere; sampler; Vocals
- Years active: 2019–present

Banjo Oluwasemilogo Kayode (born 31 March 2000), professionally known as Semzi is a Nigerian record producer, singer and songwriter. He rose to stardom in 2020 with the production of hit single 'MJ' by Bad Boy Timz. He is known for co-producing Kai! by Olamide & Wizkid which peaked at number 3 on Nigeria Top 100 (TurnTable), number 7 at UK Afrobeats Singles Chart and at number 10 on Billboard U.S. Afrobeats Songs. He peaked at number 1 on the TurnTable Official producer top 100 chart and spent 206 weeks on the chart. His primarily produced albums includes Ikigai by Olamide, Boy Alone by Omah Lay and Olamidé by Olamide.

== Early life and career ==
Semzi hails from Ogun State and grew up in Lagos State, where he had his primary and secondary education. He started his career as a record producer in 2019 where he produced 'Gbe bodi' by Oladapo.

In 2020, he rose to stardom with the release of "MJ" by Bad Boy Timz and two separate follow-up remixes which featured Nigerian singer Mayorkun and Teni. Later, he produced "The Best" by Davido featuring Mayorkun which serves as the fourth single off A Better Time.

In 2021, he produced "Holy Father" by Mayorkun and Victony and "Pronto" by Ajebo Hustlers featuring Omah Lay which earned him his first ever award nomination at The Beatz Awards. In 2022, he was ranked 14 by TurnTable's Top 20 Music Producers of H1 2022 in Nigerian Music, and also received two nominations at The Beatz Awards for Afro Pop Producer of the Year and Afro R&B Producer of the Year for his production on "Holy Father" by Mayorkun featuring Victony and "In Love" by Ajebo Hustlers featuring Fave.

In 2023, he produced 4 songs in Omah Lay’s debut studio album Boy Alone”. In 2024, he primarily produced Ikigai by Nigerian rapper Olamide where he produced 5 out of 7 songs from the EP. He was nominated in 4 categories at the 2024 Beatz Awards and reached 1 on the TurnTable Official producer top 100 chart.

In 2025 he co-produced Kai! by Olamide and Wizkid, a lead single off Olamide’s self-titled album Olamidé which he primarily produced. The song peaked at number 9 on Nigeria Top 100 (TurnTable), number 7 at UK Afrobeats Singles Chart, and at number 10 on Billboard U.S. Afrobeats Songs at 10, OkayAfrica hottest African Producers list at number 1. He released a collaborative EP with Easyscope titled Easy On Dem.

== Awards and nominations ==
Year	Event	Prize	Recipient	Result	Ref
2021	The Beatz Awards	Don Jazzy New Discovery Producer of the Year'	Semzi	Nominated	
2022	The Beatz Awards	Afro Pop Producer of the Year	Semzi	Nominated	
2022	The Beatz Awards	Afro R&B Producer of the Year	Semzi	Nominated	
2024	The Beatz Awards	Male Producer Of The Year	Semzi	Nominated	
2024	The Beatz Awards	Afro Pop Producer Of The Year	Semzi	Nominated	
2024	The Beatz Awards	Afro R&B Producer Of The Year	Semzi	Nominated	
2024	The Beatz Awards	Afro Hip-Hop Producer Of The Year	Semzi	Nominated	

== Production discography ==
Semzi Musical Productions
Year	Title	Artist	Featured Artist(s)	Ref
2019	"Gbe bodi"	Oladapo		
2020	"MJ"	Bad Boy Timz		
2020	"The Best"	Davido	Mayorkun	
2020	"MJ (Remix"	Bad Boy Timz	Mayorkun	
2020	"Proud"	Oladapo	Mayorkun	
2021	"Holy Father"	Mayorkun	Victony	
2021	"Move"	Bad Boy Timz		
2021	"Pronto"	Ajebo Hustlers	Omah Lay	
2021	"Skelele"	Bad Boy Timz	Olamide	
2021	"Consent"	Joeboy		
2021	"Sweet Daddy"	Dai Verse		
2021	"Fall for Me"	Laycon	YKB	
2021	"Leg Work"	Korede Bello		
2022	"Faya"	Bad Boy Timz		
2022	"In Love"	Ajebo Hustlers	Fave	
2022	"Sweet Daddy (Remix)"	Dai Verse	BNXN	
2023	"OHEMA"	Victony	Crayon & Bella Shmurda	
2023	"joanna"	Omah Lay		
2023	"it’s yours"	Omah Lay		
2023	"never forget"	Omah Lay		
2023	"come closer"	Omah Lay		
2023	"Love and Trust"	Iyanya	Joeboy	
2023	"Unleash"	Poco Lee	Kizz Daniel	
2023	"Jaboti"	Zlatan		
2023	"Money Language"	Savage (NGA)		
2023	"Tsunami"	Yimeeka	Semzi & Manana	
2024	"Metaverse"	Olamide		
2024	"Morowore"	Olamide		
2024	"Uptown Disco"	Olamide	Fireboy DML & Asake	
2024	"Makaveli"	Olamide		
2024	"️change your life"	Fireboy DML		
2024	"Knockout"	Olamide	Sabri (BEL)	
2024	"wande’s bop"	Fireboy DML	SPINALL	
2024	"Enchanté"	Taves		
2024	”Hii!”	ShineTTW		
2024	"TREASURE"	Timaya	Alpha P, Olamide & Phyno	
2024	"In You"	Oladapo	Semzi	
2025	"Kai!"	Olamide	Wizkid	
2025	"Free"	Olamide	Seyi Vibez & Muyeez	
2025	"MARIO KART"	Seyi Vibez		
2025	"Hasibunallah"	Olamide		
2025	"Totori"	BNXN		
2025	”HAPPY SONG”	Seyi Vibez		
2025	"1 Shot"	Olamide		
2025	"Special"	Olamide		
2025	"Hybrid"	Olamide		
2025	”Ruba”	Olamide		
2025	”Glory II”	Victony & Fridayy		
2025	My Woman	Reekado Banks	Phyno	
2025	Bebe	Zlatan	Victony	
2025	One Day	Qing Madi		
2025	Miami	SPINALL	T.I. & Olamide	
2025	Keep On Rockin’	Mayorkun		
2025	Eat	Falz		
2026	"Big Performer"	Blaqbonez		
2026	"Come on"	Larry Gaaga	Olamide, Mavo & Kidd Carder	
2026	"Joy"	Shoday		
