= Olamidé (album) =

2025 studio album by Olamide

Studio album by Olamide
- Released: 19 June 2025
- Genre: Afrobeats
- Length: 47:21
- Labels: YBNL; Empire Distribution
- Producers: Eskeez; Semzi; Yung Willis

Olamide chronology
Ikigai (2024)	Olamidé (2025)	Time and Space (2026)

Singles from Olamidé
- 1. "Kai!" Released: 28 April 2025; 2. "99" Released: 9 June 2025

Olamidé is the eleventh studio album by Nigerian rapper Olamide. It was released on 19 June 2025 by YBNL Nation and Empire Distribution, and features guest appearances from Wizkid, Seyi Vibez, Asake, Muyeez, Dr. Dre, Spinall, Darkoo, BOJ, Popcaan, Young Jonn, Daecolm, Fxrtune and Fadi. Olamidé was preceded by the singles "Kai!" and "99". The album serves as a follow-up to Ikigai (2024).

== Background and release ==
Olamide announced the self-titled album on his official twitter account few hours after he released the lead single on the album titled “Kai!” collaborating with Wizkid.

The album was first set for release on 3 June 2025, then delayed to 9 June, then it was eventually delayed to 19 June 2025.

== Singles ==
The lead single, "Kai!", released on April 29, 2025, carries the famous Konto bounce over which Olamide and Wizkid sweet talk a love interest in whose face they flaunt their wealth. The song marks their first collaboration since "Totori" in 2019. Wizkid appears twice on the album.

The latest being "99" with guest verses from Asake, Seyi Vibez, Young Jonn, and British singer Daecolm. Produced by Yung Willis and song plugged by Olaitan, the song gave listeners a lively preview of what’s to come on the full album.

== Track listing ==
Olamidé track listing
No.	Title	Writer(s)	Producer(s)	Length
1.	"Prelude" (featuring Fxrtune)	Kymani Duggan	Eskeez	0:55
2.	"Hasibunallah"	Olamide Gbenga Adedeji	Semzi; Eskeez	2:42
3.	"Kai!" (with Wizkid)	Adedeji; Ayodeji Ibrahim Balogun	Eskeez; Semzi	2:55
4.	"Luvaluvah"	Adedeji	P.Priime	2:50
5.	"Billionaires Club" (featuring Wizkid and Darkoo)	Adedeji; Balogun; Oluwafisayo Isa	P.Priime	3:46
6.	"Free" (featuring Muyeez and Seyi Vibez)	Adedeji; Abdulmuiz Moshood; Oluwaloseyi Afolabi Balogun	Semzi; Larrylanes	3:31
7.	"Duro"	Adedeji	P.Priime	3:06
8.	"Special"	Adedeji	Semzi; Eskeez	3:22
9.	"Indika" (featuring Dr. Dre and Spinall)	Adedeji; Andre Romelle Young; Sodamola Desmond Oluseye; Varick Smith; Brandon Perry; Tia Myrie	Spinall	1:49
10.	"1 Shot"	Adedeji	Semzi; Eskeez	2:58
11.	"99" (featuring Daecolm, Asake, Seyi Vibez and Young Jonn)	Adedeji; Daecolm Holland; Ahmed Ololade; Balogun; John Saviours Udomboso	Yung Willis	4:09
12.	"Ruba"	Adedeji	Semzi; Eskeez	2:50
13.	"Rain" (featuring Popcaan)	Adedeji; Andrae Hugh Sutherland	Eskeez	3:45
14.	"Paris" (featuring Fadi)	Fadimatou Mossi	Eskeez; ID Cabasa	1:12
15.	"Hybrid"	Adedeji	Semzi	2:19
16.	"Lalakipo"	Adedeji	Magicsticks	2:24
17.	"Stronger" (featuring BOJ)	Adedeji; Bolaji Odojukan	Bbanks	2:40
Total length:				47:21

== Charts ==
Chart performance for Olamidé
Chart (2025)	Peak position
Nigerian Albums (TurnTable)	1
US World Albums (Billboard)	6

== Release history ==
Release history and formats for Olamidé
Region	Date	Format	Label
Various	19 June 2025	Digital download	YBNL Nation; Empire Distribution
