= What Have We Done =

EP by Omah Lay
- Released: 20 November 2020
- Genre: Contemporary R&B; Alté; Afropop; Afrobeats
- Length: 14:13
- Label: KeyQaad; Sire Records
- Producer: Omah Lay; Tuzi; Echo The Guru; Tempoe; Bizzouch

Omah Lay chronology
Get Layd (2020)	What Have We Done (2020)	Boy Alone (2022)

What Have We Done is the second EP by Nigerian singer and record producer Omah Lay. Released through KeyQaad and Sire Records on 20 November 2020, the album's production was handled by Omah Lay, alongside Bizzouch, Tuzi, Echo The Guru, and Tempoe. The EP houses the remix of his “Get Layd” hit track “Damn” featuring American rapper 6lack.

What Have We Done has surpassed 100 million streams on Spotify since its release.

== Background and release ==
Following the success of his debut extended play Get Layd, released 6 months ago, Omah Lay released What Have We Done.

== Composition ==
The EP contains four tracks which was produced by Omah Lay, alongside Bizzouch, Tuzi, Echo The Guru, and Tempoe, with all songs mixed and mastered by Swaps.

== Personnel ==
Credits adapted from back cover.

- Omah Lay - production, songwriting
- Bizzouch - production
- Echo The Guru - production
- Tempoe - production, songwriting
- Swaps - mixing and mastering
- Tuzi - production
- Clean Bolu - Additional Guitar
- 6lack - songwriting

== Track listing ==
All tracks are written by Stanley Omah Didia, except where noted.

"What Have We Done" track listing
No.	Title	Writer(s)	Producer(s)	Length
1.	"My Bebe"		Echo The Guru	2:39
2.	"Can't Relate"		Tuzi	2:51
3.	"Godly"	Stanley Omah Didia; Michael Chigozie Alagwu	Tempoe	2:43
4.	"Confession"		Omah Lay	2:18
5.	"Damn" (featuring 6lack)	Stanley Omah Didia; Ricardo Valdez Valentine Jr	Bizzouch	3:27
Total length:				14:00

== Charts ==
Chart performance for Get Layd
Chart (2022)	Peak position
Nigerian Albums (TurnTable)	31

== Release history ==
Release history and formats for What Have We Done
Region	Date	Format	Label
Various	20 November 2020	Streaming; digital download	KeyQaad; Sire
