= International College of Creative Arts =

Private arts university based in the United Kingdom and Nigeria

The International College of Creative Arts
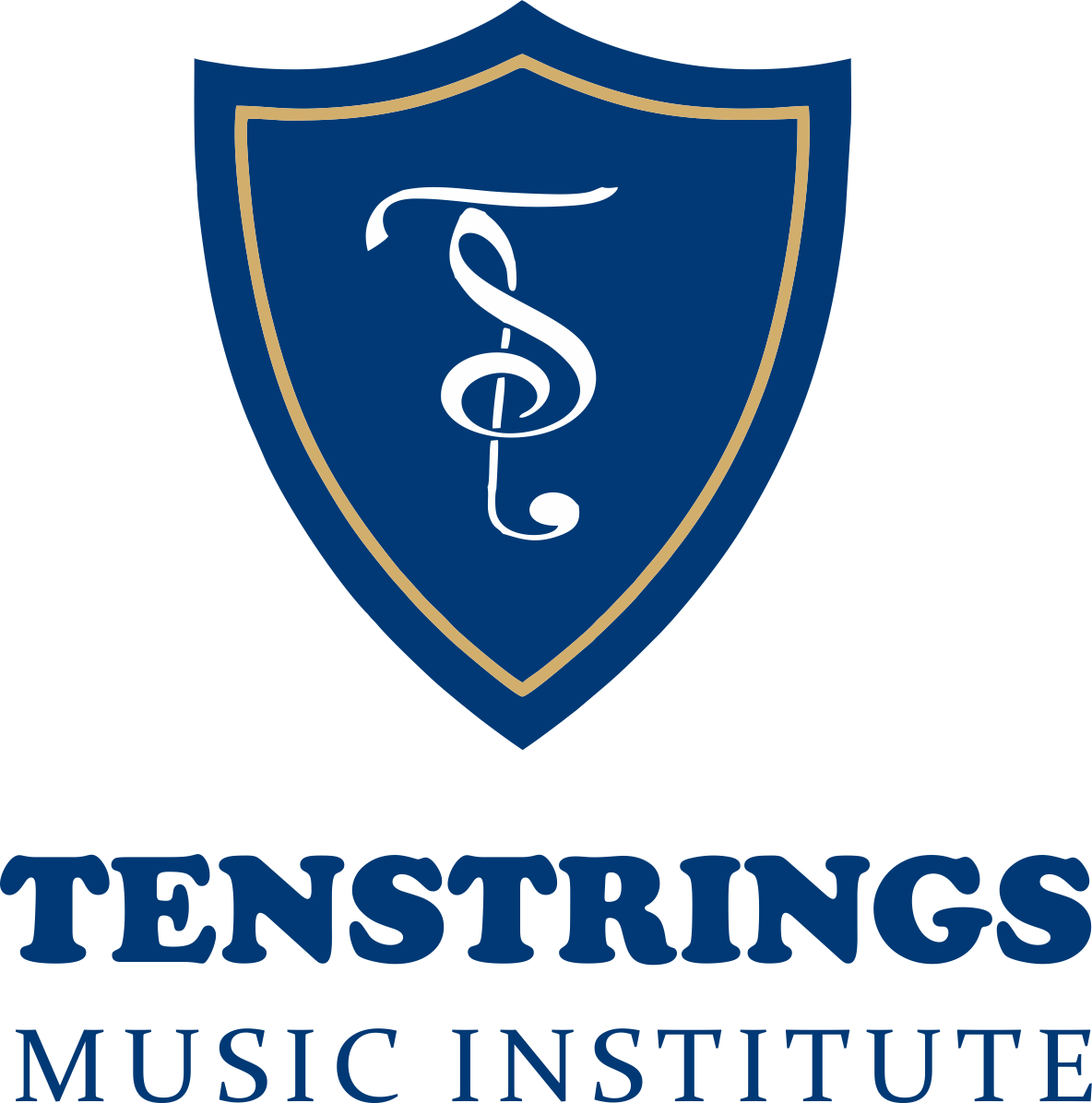
- First establishment logo
- Type: Private
- Established: February 15, 2007 (16 years ago, as Tenstrings Music Institute)
- Founder: Akapo Emmanuel
- Location: United Kingdom, Nigeria; 6.49302°N 3.35689°E
- Campus: Multiple sites
- Website: thecollegeofarts.com

The International College of Creative Arts, abbreviated as ICCA, is a specialist private university for the creative arts incorporated in the United Kingdom and Nigeria. It was founded in 2007, and offers training from the undergraduate to the masters level, and other short courses in all aspects of the creative arts. ICCA is accredited by the Accreditation Service for International Colleges, Federal government of Nigeria and other accrediting bodies.

== History ==
The International College of Creative Arts was established in 2007 as Tenstrings Music School in focus as a contemporary music conservatory in Nigeria, where it is the country's largest music school with study centers in Ikeja, Surulere, Festac Town, Lekki, Port Harcourt and affiliated schools in other parts of the country. Over the last nine years, Tenstrings has enrolled students from at least ten other African countries, including Ghana, Zambia, Kenya, Uganda, Cameroon, etc.

Tenstrings was founded in 2007 by Akapo Emmanuel – a Nigerian music educator, after several years of teaching music in both public and private institutions. His aim was to create a vocational training center for young and talented people who dream of pursuing careers in popular music; such as Hip Hop, R&B, Gospel, Afro Music, e.t.c, whom the regular classically oriented music schools were not catering to. Some of the notable activities and events organized periodically by the institute include; The Starmingle, HippyJams, Gospel Breakfast, Playing4Change and The Ones2Watch Concert.

The school offers professional training in music business, singing, playing musical instruments, dance, music performance, disc-jockeying, music production, gospel music program, and sound engineering. In September 2016, it was reported that the school has trained over 7000 students in about a decade of its establishment. In 2015, the school institutionalized career management and promotional services for its protégées.

== Notable alumni and faculty ==
=== Notable alumni ===
- Spinall, Nigerian disc jockey, record producer, songwriter and label executive
- Snazzy the Optimist, Nigerian singer, songwriter and rapper
- DJ Lambo, Nigerian musician
- Eva Alordiah, Nigerian rapper
- Judikay, Gospel singer

=== Notable faculty ===
- Femi Ogunrombi
- Onyeka Onwenu
- Yinka Davies
