= Soso (Omah Lay song) =

Single by Omah Lay

from the album Boy Alone
- Released: July 15, 2022
- Genre: Afrobeats
- Length: 3:03
- Label: Sire; KeyQaad
- Songwriters: Stanley Didia; Tempoe
- Producer: Tempoe

Omah Lay singles chronology
"Attention" (2022)	"Soso" (2022)	"Reason" (2023)

Music video
- "Soso" on YouTube

"Soso" (stylized in lowercase) is a song by Nigerian singer Omah Lay released by KeyQaad as the second single from Lay's debut studio album, Boy Alone, on 15 July 2022. The song was written by Omah Lay and Tempoe who also produced the song. In "Soso" Lay sings about his struggles with mental health and depression. A remix featuring Puerto Rican singer Ozuna was released in 2023.

== Charts ==
Weekly chart performance for "Soso"
Chart (2022–2024)	Peak position
France (SNEP)	194
Netherlands (Single Top 100)	79
Nigeria (TurnTable Top 50)	1
Switzerland (Schweizer Hitparade)	52
Portugal (AFP)	196
UK Afrobeats Singles (OCC)	13
US Afrobeats Songs (Billboard)	12

== Certifications ==
Certifications for "Soso"
Region	Certification	Certified units/sales
Canada (Music Canada)	Platinum	80,000^{‡}
France (SNEP)	Diamond	333,333^{‡}
Nigeria (TCSN)	6× Platinum	600,000^{‡}
Portugal (AFP)	Platinum	10,000^{‡}
Spain (Promusicae)	Gold	30,000^{‡}
United Kingdom (BPI)	Silver	200,000^{‡}
United States (RIAA)	Gold	500,000^{‡}
^{‡} Sales+streaming figures based on certification alone.
