= Boy Alone =

Studio album by Omah Lay
- Released: 14 July 2022
- Genre: Afrobeats
- Length: 37:51 (standard edition); 54:42 (deluxe edition)
- Labels: KeyQaad; Sire
- Producers: Orlandoh; P2J; Tempoe; P.Priime; Niphkeys; BGRZ; Semzi; Avedon; Debox; Harv; Tunesfactory; Sammy SoSo

Omah Lay chronology
What Have We Done (2020)	Boy Alone (2022)	Clarify of Mind (2026)

Singles from Boy Alone
- 1. "Understand" Released: 8 July 2021; 2. "Attention" Released: 4 March 2022; 3. "I'm a Mess" Released: 22 July 2022; 4. "Soso" Released: 30 November 2022

Singles from Boy Alone deluxe edition
- 1. "Soso (Remix)" Released: 18 May 2023; 2. "Reason" Released: 17 June 2023

Boy Alone is the debut studio album by Nigerian singer Omah Lay. It was released on 14 July 2022, by KeyQaad and Sire Records, while its deluxe edition was released on 15 June 2023. The standard edition features guest appearances from Tay Iwar and Justin Bieber, while the deluxe edition features guest appearances from Ozuna and Aitch. Production was handled by Niphkeys, Tempoe, Semzi, Orlandoh, P.Priime, P2J, Tunesfactory, Harv, Sammy SoSo, BGRZ, Debox and Avedon. The album serves as a follow-up to his second EP, What Have We Done (2020).

== Background and recording ==
Omah Lay began recording Boy Alone in 2021 during a difficult time in his life, showing a change from his earlier work. He said the album reflects how he felt then, with songs like "I'm a Mess", "Understand", and "Soso" showing its main themes. Although most of it was finished by 2022, he did not see the album as complete until he recorded "Soso". He later released a deluxe edition since he felt that "the story wasn’t complete" and he "wanted to show the other side" after leaving the "dark place" that inspired the album. He also said the album took about 18 months to make, partly because he overthought the process. He described it as personal, and said Boy Alone, which shares its title with his father's name, reflects his aim to stay true to himself.

== Critical reception ==
Professional ratings
Review scores
Source	Rating
Clash	7/10
The Native	8.1/10
Pulse Nigeria	8.4/10

=== Standard edition reviews ===
The standard edition of the album received critical acclaim and has been hailed by many as one of the best debut Afrobeats albums. Pulse Nigeria's Motolani Alake rated Boy Alone 8.4/10, calling it "a commendable debut album" driven by "honest, scary and relatable songwriting", though some production may feel "insufficient" on first listen. He added that it "gets better with every listen" and offers "deep cuts, commercial hits and cult favorites", showing Omah Lay "survived the pressure". Adedamola Jones Adedayo, a writer for Afrocritik characterized Boy Alone as a "piece of novelty" that traces Omah Lay's search for love and identity, showing he is not "immune to hiccups" despite fame and noting its focus on "selfhood and tumultuous love".

In a review for The Native magazine, Emmanuel Esomnofu said the album was "about mental health and hedonism", praising its "richly layered" production and calling it "a dazzling showcase of his ingenuity" from Omah Lay. He added that it presents a "cohesive tale of young existence" and a "personal work" that could rank among "the most important offerings of 2022", awarding it an 8.1/10 rating. Patrick Ezema, reviewing for The Lagos Review described Boy Alone as an album about "the consoling pleasures of drugs and sex", with "hazy production" and "sonic lushness" that shape its introspective tone. He added that Omah Lay's writing is "more veiled" and said that when such lyricism appears, "it should be afforded its accolades".

Adanna O of TXT Mag said that Boy Alone consisted of "bops with depth, feeling and a great deal of introspection" with "a clear lyrical lifeline" and "stellar" writing. She concluded that it was a "stunning achievement" where Omah Lay proved himself "one of the most gifted songwriters of his generation". Ana Lamond of Clash called the album a "poignant 14 journey into afrobeats" with an "unshakingly honest" voice and "deeply personal" themes, praising how "truthful songwriting can too urge its listener to get up and dance" while noting it risked "playing things too safe". Lamond concluded that Omah Lay was "pushing for a sound that transcends the global reach of afrobeats" and awarded it a rating of 7/10.

=== Deluxe edition reviews ===
Adeayo Adebiyi of Pulse Nigeria said the Boy Alone deluxe shows Omah Lay "in a better place" and "reaching out to help others heal", adding that it retains the album's "artistic depth" while expanding its sound. He noted that the project "expertly combines Afropop, Afro-R&B, Amapiano, and Swing", and that Omah Lay "seems to have figured out a way to give his… debut even more acclaim". Agwuma Kingsley of Modern Ghana wrote that the Boy Alone deluxe presents Omah Lay as a "genuine loner", using music as "that channel to detoxify himself" while telling "captivating stories" of pain and emotion. He added that these themes are "something several listeners can relate and find a strong connection with", reflecting shared "misery" and personal struggles. Jubril Lawal of the Upper Entertainment wrote that the Boy Alone deluxe highlights Omah Lay's "unfiltered truth", adding that Omah Lay "tells us exactly what's on his mind", presenting emotions like "hurt, disappointment, and hopelessness" across the project.

=== Accolades ===
Year	Awards ceremony	Award description(s)	Results
2023	The Headies	Album of the Year	Nominated
2023	African Entertainment Awards USA	Album of the Year	Nominated

== Track listing ==
Side A (standard edition; credits adapted from back cover.)
No.	Title	Writer(s)	Producer(s)	Length
1.	"Recognize"	Stanley Didia; Ojo Tobi	Orlandoh	1:23
2.	"I"	Didia; Richard Isong	P2J	3:12
3.	"Bend You"	Didia; Michael Alagwu	Tempoe	2:39
4.	"Woman"	Didia; Peace Oredope	P.Priime	2:48
5.	"I'm a Mess"	Didia; Adebajo Adebanjo	Niphkeys	2:33
6.	"Temptations"	Didia; Mike Gbaguidi; Kyle Monkman	BGRZ	2:31
7.	"Understand"	Didia; Alagwu	Tempoe	2:54
8.	"Never Forget"	Didia; Oluwasemilogo Banjo	Semzi	3:09
9.	"Safe Haven"	Didia; Agunbiade Adebola	Debox	2:49
10.	"Attention" (with Justin Bieber)	Didia; Justin Bieber; Vincent van den Ende; Bernard Harvey; Felisha King	Harv; Avedon	3:00
11.	"Soso"	Didia; Alagwu	Tempoe	3:03
12.	"How to Luv"	Didia; Michael Innocent; Kelvin Oriye	Tunesfactory	2:31
13.	"Tell Everybody" (featuring Tay Iwar)	Didia; Austin Iwar; Isong	P2J; Sammy SoSo	2:48
14.	"Purple Song"	Didia; Alagwu	Tempoe	2:25
Total length:				37:51

Side B (deluxe edition bonus tracks)
No.	Title	Writer(s)	Producer(s)	Length
15.	"Reason"	Didia; Michael Opara	Tuzi	2:37
16.	"Come Closer"	Didia; Banjo; Samuel Adetiloye; Fortune Ohuizu	Semzi; Timmy	2:35
17.	"It's Yours"	Didia; Banjo	Semzi; Omah Lay	2:45
18.	"Imagine" (featuring Aitch)	Didia; Harrison Armstrong; Gbaguidi; Damilola Aminu	BGRZ	2:46
19.	"Joanna"	Didia; Banjo	Semzi	2:53
20.	"Soso" (remix; featuring Ozuna)	Didia; Alagwu	Tempoe; Yazid Rivera; Eduardo Alfonso Vargas	3:22
Total length:				54:42

== Charts ==
Chart performance for Boy Alone
Chart (2022–25)	Peak position
Belgian Albums (Ultratop Flanders)	169
Belgian Albums (Ultratop Wallonia)	158
Dutch Albums (Album Top 100)	42
French Albums (SNEP)	106
Nigerian Albums (TurnTable)	1
Swiss Albums (Schweizer Hitparade)	82
US Heatseekers Albums (Billboard)	8
US World Albums (Billboard)	12

== Certifications ==
Certifications for Boy Alone
Region	Certification	Certified units/sales
France (SNEP)	Gold	50,000^{‡}
United Kingdom (BPI)	Silver	60,000^{‡}
^{‡} Sales+streaming figures based on certification alone.

== Release history ==
Release history and formats for Boy Alone
Region	Date	Format	Label
Various	9 August 2023	Streaming; digital download	KeyQaad; Sire
