= Akapo Emmanuel =

Emmanuel Akapo
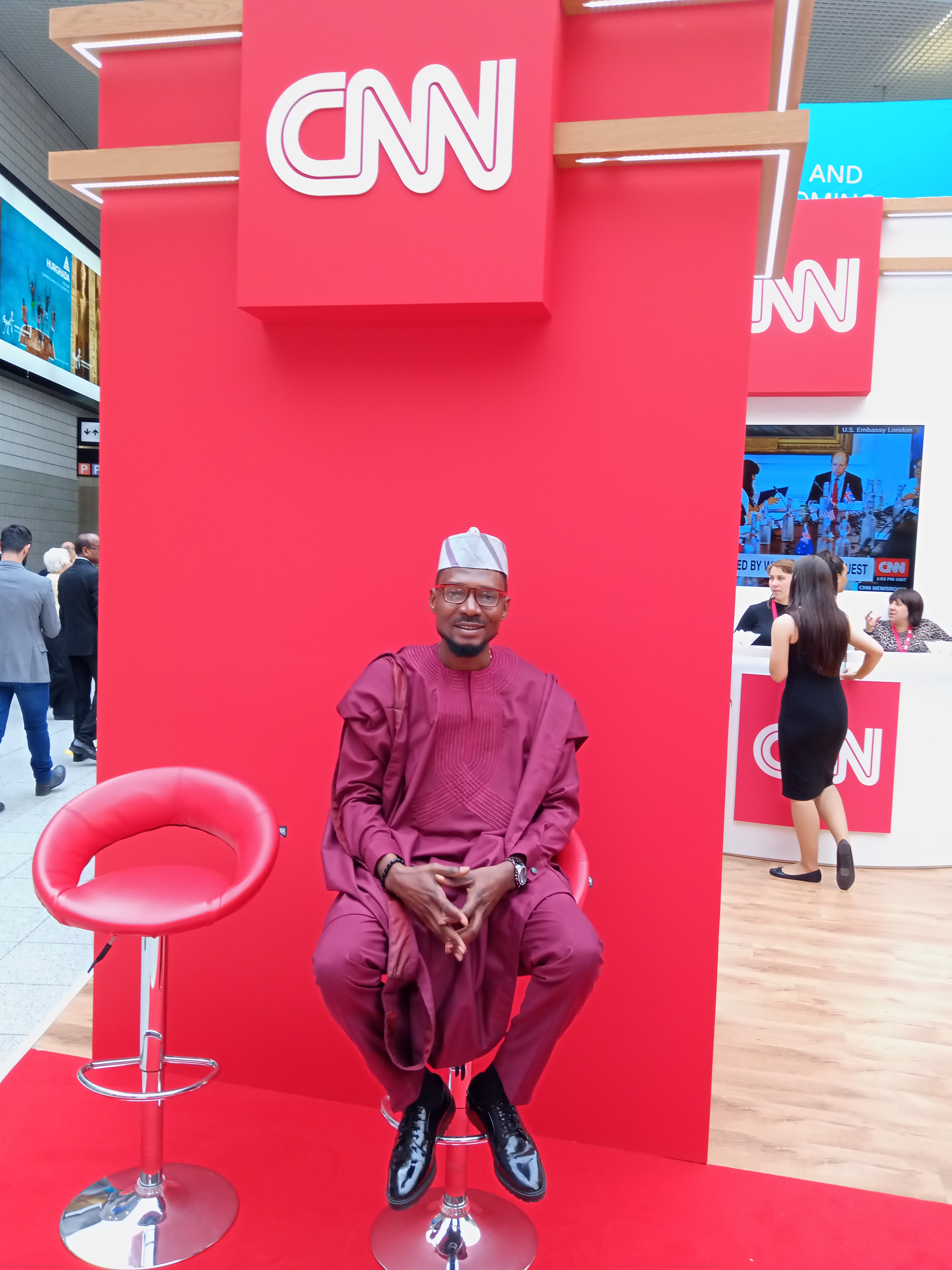
- Akapo at the World Travel Market, London, November 2019, about to be interviewed by CNN

Background information
- Born: 10 November 1981 (age 44); Lagos, Nigeria
- Origin: Badagry, Lagos, Nigeria
- Occupations: Entrepreur, Music educator, songwriter, record producer, showbiz
- Years active: (2001 –present)
- Website: http://akapoemmanuel.com

Emmanuel Akapo (born November 10, 1981) is a Nigerian creative entrepreneur, record producer, writer and music educator. He is the founder of Tenstrings Music Institute, a music academy with multiple centers in Nigeria. He has worked with notable Nigerian musicians such as Sound Sultan, Eva Alordiah, Bez, and Brymo. He is also the founder of Black Fragrance School of Design, a Lagos-based design academy offering vocational training in design fields such as fashion design, interior decor, animation, photography, website and graphics design.

In 2018, Akapo founded Africa Heritage International – a global Social Enterprise promoting the African culture, economic potential of Africa and Black heritage in diaspora with the aim of attracting sustainable development to Africa. AHI is the organiser of the annual Africa Heritage International Festival. The 2021 edition of the three day festival is slated to hold in Birmingham, UK, and plans to host 6,000 physical guests and millions of virtual participants from around the world. AHI has its international headquarters in the UK and a governing council comprising renowned individuals from other countries such as the United States, Canada, Australia, Nigeria and Brazil.

== Early life and career ==
Raised in Lagos, Akapo had his primary and secondary school education in Lagos. Although he had the dream of becoming an electronic engineer, he discovered his passion for music and began playing professionally as a pianist at the age of 17. As the years went by, he picked up more instruments one after the other, such as the violin, trumpet and saxophone. After receiving several professional training and self-development, Akapo began his music education career in Lagos in 2001 by picking up appointments as a part-time music instructor with a number of schools. Some of the schools where he taught music include Olivefield International School, Nigerian Model Schools, Yetkem High School and Pencils Film and Television Institute (PEFTI). In 2005, he enrolled at Lagos State University for a first degree in public administration.

== Tenstrings Music Institute ==
After several years of music teaching experience, in 2007, Akapo founded Tenstrings Music Institute, a music academy that provides vocational training for young people who want to pursue careers in music. He started the music school in a shared office apartment in Festac Town, Lagos, but soon left there for a bigger place in same Festac Town. Although, he found it very challenging at the beginning, four years after establishment, the school had experienced a huge growth and wide acceptance. Today, Tenstrings is one of Nigeria's leading music institutes, having expanded rapidly and currently running study centers in Ikeja, Surulere, Lekki and Festac Town, also having affiliates in Abuja, Port Harcourt and Akure. It has trained over 4000 persons in about eight years. Some of the notable activities and events organized periodically by the institute include; The Starmingle, HippyJams, Gospel Breakfast, Playing4Change and The Ones2Watch Concert.

== Black Fragrance Foundation ==
In July 2018, Akapo launched a new social enterprise known as Black Fragrance Foundation – an international social enterprise that seeks to foster sustainable development in Africa through entrepreneurial and social innovations that improve access to education, strengthen the creative economy and develop enterprise. The foundation which opened in two offices simultaneously in Lagos runs two major entrepreneurial initiatives: the Black Fragrance School of Design and Black Fragrance Designs International. He hopes to reduce poverty in Nigeria through these initiatives by providing vocational training for young people in the creative industries and investing time and capital in helping them establish, expand or improve their lives through economic empowerment and enterprise development.

== Published works ==
Akapo has published several music training materials, the biggest and most recent of them is the 580-page Musician Handbook with a two-hour DVD titled 'You've Got Music'. The content spans rudiments of music, songwriting, music business, audio technology and musicianship.

In addition to his published training materials, Akapo is also an ardent writer and speaker on music business and the entertainment industry in general. He writes for Newspapers and organizes music industry workshops periodically.
