= My Story: The Album =

Studio album by DJ Spinall
- Released: 29 October 2015
- Length: 53:21
- Label: TheCAPMusic
- Producer: DJ Spinall; Spellz; Don L37; D'Tunes; Rayce; J Fem; E Kelly; Pheelz; Drey Beatz; B.Banks; Tekno; Killertunes

DJ Spinall chronology
My Story: The Album (2015)	Ten (2016)

Singles from My Story: The Album
- 1. "Gba Gbe E" Released: 30 January 2014; 2. "Oluwa" Released: 23 September 2014; 3. "Attendance" Released: 12 January 2015; 4. "Excuse Me" Released: 12 August 2015; 5. "Pepper Dem" Released: 20 October 2015

My Story: The Album is the debut studio album by Nigerian disc jockey and record producer DJ Spinall. It was released on 29 October 2015 by TheCAPMusic, through State of Mind Entertainment. The album features guest appearances from Yemi Alade, M.I Abaga, Mafikizolo, Timaya, Ice Prince, 2Face Idibia, Reminisce, Pheelz, Byno, Burna Boy, Niniola, Tekno, Rayce, Wande Coal, Niniola, Sojay, Sean Tizzle, Kimz, a skit from Calibird and Mikky, and the Ojokoro Mass Choir. Production was handled by DJ Spinall himself, Spellz, Don L37, D'Tunes, Rayce, J Fem, E Kelly, Pheelz, Drey Beatz, B.Banks, Tekno, and Killertunes.

== Background and house party ==
DJ Spinall revealed the album cover and track list to the album on 20 October 2015.

DJ Spinall held a house party to celebrate the release of the album on 14 November 2015. Attendants of the party include of Tee-Y Mix, Lynxxx, Naeto C, Iyanya, Wande Coal, Jaywon, Illbliss, Adekunle Gold, Immaculate, DJ Sose, DJ Caise, Jude Okoye, Olisa Adibua, and others.

== Singles ==
The album's lead single "Gba Gbe E" featuring Burna Boy was released on 30 January 2014. Serving as Spinall's first official single, it was produced by Spellz. The second single "Oluwa" features M.I and Byno. It was produced by E Kelly and was released on 23 September 2014. My Story's third single, "Attendance" featuring Olamide was released on 12 January 2015. It was produced by B.Banks. The fourth single off the album, "Excuse Me", features Timaya, and was released on 12 August 2015 with production from Killertunes. The fifth and final single "Pepper Dem" featuring Yemi Alade was released on 20 October 2015. "Pepper Dem" was produced by E Kelly.

== Critical reception ==
Professional ratings
Review scores
Source	Rating
Pulse Nigeria	3.5/5 stars

Wilfred Okiche in his review for 360nobs described My Story as a record that "should not work on paper" but succeeds in delivering "silly music that is at once empty and danceable." He praised tracks like "Tan Mo" for Niniola’s hypnotic vocals and "Attendance" for Olamide’s playful energy, while noting some missteps, such as Mafikizolo's uninspired performance on "The Way". The album was characterized as unpretentious, sticking to DJ Spinall's strengths by delivering a "long dance party." Joey Akan of Pulse Nigeria praised My Story as "the culmination" of DJ Spinall's journey through hard work and perseverance, calling it "a win for Nigeria’s pop movement" with its balanced collaborations and contributions to feel-good moments. He highlighted tracks like "Shout Out" with Wande Coal and "Pepper Dem" with Yemi Alade as standout examples of vibrant dance music. The album received a rating of 3.5/5.

== Track listing ==
My Story: The Album track listing
No.	Title	Writer(s)	Producer(s)	Length
1.	"My Story (Intro)" (featuring the Ojokoro Mass Choir)	Oluseye Sodamola	DJ Spinall	0:53
2.	"Oluwa" (featuring M.I and Byno)	Sodamola; Jude Abaga	E Kelly; Spinall	3:46
3.	"Money" (featuring 2Face Idibia and Wande Coal)	Innocent Idibia; Oluwatobi Ojosipe	E Kelly	4:17
4.	"Tan Mo" (featuring Niniola)	Niniola Apata	Don L37	3:09
5.	"Fiyenle" (featuring Reminisce, Sojay, and Kimz)	Remilekun Safaru; Samuel Okorie Jr.; Akeem Adisa	Drey Beatz; DJ Spinall	4:07
6.	"Attendance" (featuring Olamide)	Olamide Adedeji	B.Banks	3:31
7.	"Excuse Me" (featuring Timaya)	Inetimi Odon	Killertunes	3:44
8.	"The Way" (featuring Mafikizolo and Ice Prince)	Theo Kgosinkwe; Nhlanhla Mafu; Panshak Zamani	Drey Beatz	3:24
9.	"My Heart" (featuring Rayce)	Kingsley Amoni	Rayce	3:48
10.	"Baby" (featuring Tekno)	Augustine Kelechi	Tekno	3:46
11.	"Shout Out" (featuring Wande Coal)	Sodamola; Ojosipe	J Fem	3:32
12.	"Gba Gbe E" (featuring Burna Boy)	Sodamola; Damini Ogulu	Spellz	3:45
13.	"Client's Skit" (featuring Calibird and Mikki Jaga)		—	1:45
14.	"Pepper Dem" (featuring Yemi Alade)	Yemi Alade	E Kelly	3:44
15.	"Feel It" (featuring Sean Tizzle)	Sodamola; Oluwaseun Morihanfen	D'Tunes	3:19
16.	"No Sorrow" (featuring Pheelz)	Phillip Moses	Pheelz	3:31
Total length:				53:21

Notes

- "—" denotes a skit

== Personnel ==
Credits adapted from back cover.

- DJ Spinall — production
- E Kelly — production
- Don L37 — production
- Drey Beatz — production
- B.Banks — production
- Killertunes — production
- Rayce — production
- Tekno — production
- J Fem — production
- Spellz — production
- D'Tunes — production
- Pheelz — production

== Release history ==
Release history and formats for My Story: The Album
Region	Date	Format	Label
Various	29 October 2015	CD; digital download	State of Mind, TheCAPMusic
