= Dotman =

Nigerian singer (born c.1993)

- Also known as: DOTMAN
- Born: Olatunji Oladotun Alade; 1993 (age 32–33); Ogun State, Nigeria
- Origin: Agosasa, Ipokia Local Government, Ogun State, Nigeria
- Genres: Afro Pop|Rap
- Occupations: Singer, rapper, performer.
- Years active: 2014 – present
- Labels: He is an independent artiste, managed by; 808 Recordz
- Website: www.dotmanofficial.com

Olatunji Oladotun Alade (born in c.1993 in Ogun State, Nigeria), popularly known as Dotman, is a Nigerian singer, rapper, performer and the CEO of 808 Recordz. He is most famous for his hit singles "Akube", "My Woman", "Afro Girl" and "Omoge".

== Career ==
Olatunji Oladotun Alade was born in Agosasa, Ipokia, Ogun State, Nigeria and is a member of the Yoruba ethnic group in South-Western Nigeria. He attended Abeokuta Grammar School and studied at the University of Lagos (degree in Physics Education). Inspired by artistes like King Sunny Ade, Fela Kuti, Akon, 9ice and Da Grin, he credits the start of his music career to him winning a rap competition at the University of Lagos.

In 2016, he was featured on TooXclusive's "Artistes To Watch in 2017 and Vibe.ng's "7 Breakthrough Acts To Watch Out For in 2017" In January 2017, Dotman performed at Big Brother Naija's Live Eviction Show in South Africa.

In 2020, Dotman was signed to the music label Labo Entertainment which is a subsidiary of Labo Group owned by Nigerian entrepreneur Olabisi Akanbi.

In May 2021, After spending a year with the label, Dotman returned to the role of a CEO pushing his craft forward with his record label.

== Discography ==
=== Releases ===
- 2015 "Yes Melo"
- 2015 "Blessing"
- 2015 "Fine Girl"
- 2015 "Kilowade"
- 2015 "Orimi"
- 2015 "Yes Melo (Remix) Ft. Olamide"
- 2016 "Akube"
- 2016 "Respek" (Collaboration: DJ Kaywise featuring Dotman)
- 2017 "Escobar Ft. Davido"
- 2017 "My Woman"
- 2017 "Do Proper" (Collaboration: Ike Chuks featuring Dotman)
- 2017 ″Afro Girl″ (Collaboration: Dotman featuring Mr Eazi)
- 2017 "I Want You" (Collaboration: DJ Moh Green featuring Dotman)
- 2017 "Popping Bottles"
- 2018 "Iyawo"
- 2018 "Rara"
- 2018 "Pepesu" (Collaboration: Dotman featuring DJ Tunez)
- 2018 "Owo" (Collaboration: Dotman and Wolfgang featuring DJ Memphis)
- 2018 "Omoge" (Collaboration: Spinall featuring Dotman)
- 2018 "Flyaway" (Collaboration: MKO featuring Dotman)
- 2018 "Nomali"
- 2019 "Best Behaviour"
- 2019 "Frenemies"
- 2019 "Naija (Say No To Xenophobia)"
- 2019 "Awe"
- 2019 "Till I Die"
- 2020 "Pariwo" (Collaboration: DJ Xclusive featuring Dotman)
- 2020 "These Days"
- 2020 "Enugbe"
- 2020 "Feelings"
- 2020 "Duro"
- 2020 "Giveaway"
- 2021 ''Hakuna Matata Album"
- 2021 “Drunk In Love” (Collaboration: Dotman x DJ Neptune)
- 2022 “Vibes and Chill” (Collaboration: with EL)
- 2022 "Daddy Duties"
- 2022 "Say No More" (Collaboration: with Peruzzi)
