= Get Layd =

EP by Omah Lay
- Released: 22 May 2020
- Genre: R&B; Afropop; Afrobeats
- Length: 14:00
- Label: KeyQaad; Sire
- Producer: Omah Lay; Bizzouch; El Jack; Andre Vibez

Omah Lay chronology
Get Layd (2020)	What Have We Done (2020)

Singles from Get Layd
- 1. "Bad Influence" Released: 16 January 2020; 2. "You" Released: 14 February 2020

Professional ratings
Review scores
Source	Rating
Pulse Nigeria	7.5/10

Get Layd is the debut EP by Nigerian singer and record producer Omah Lay. Released through KeyQaad and Sire Records on 22 May 2020, the album's production was handled by Omah Lay, alongside Bizzouch, El Jack, and Andre Vibez.

== Critical reception ==
Motolani Alake of Pulse Nigeria praised the EP as a strong showcase of his remarkable songwriting, blending "Fireboy's creative penmanship with Wizkid's vibes." Highlighting tracks like "You" and "Bad Influence," Alake described the EP as "a beautiful introduction to yet another momentous talent in the Nigerian change of guard" and rated it 7.5 out of 10. Emmanuel Esomnofu of NotJustOk praised the EP as a showcase of Omah Lay's intricate songwriting, "a pen many artists should tap into," and his ability to blend narratives of love, tension, and lifestyle. Highlighting tracks like "Bad Influence" and "Ye Ye Ye," Esomnofu described the EP as proof of Omah Lay's unique potential in Afro Pop and noted its double entendre as both an artistic statement and a soundtrack for intimate moments.

Olalekan Okeremilekun of tooXclusive highlighted Get Layd as a youthful and exciting body of work that showcases Omah Lay's vocal prowess and unique style, blending Afrobeat, highlife, R&B, and reggae influences. Describing it as "cocky, confident, and sexy," the review highlighted tracks like "Damn" for its vivid imagery and "Bad Influence" for its Drake-like mellow vibe, while noting Omah Lay's potential to grow beyond his comfort zone. Dami Ajayi of The Lagos Review praised Get Layd as a promising debut that explores love and intimacy through Omah Lay's unique Afrobeats style, blending dreamy and melancholic elements. Describing the EP as "a big foot forward," Ajayi highlighted "Bad Influence" for its confessional tone and "Ye Ye Ye" for its primal appeal, noting Omah Lay's potential as a multi-talented artist who writes, produces, and mixes his own music.

== Track listing ==
All tracks are written by Stanley Omah Didia, except where noted.

Get Layd track listing
No.	Title	Writer(s)	Producer(s)	Length
1.	"Damn"	Stanley Omah Didia; John Oche	Bizzouch	2:39
2.	"Lo Lo"		Omah Lay	2:51
3.	"You"	Stanley Omah Didia; Ebenezer Lawson	El Jack	2:43
4.	"Bad Influence"		Omah Lay	2:18
5.	"Ye Ye Ye"	Stanley Omah Didia; Alexander Uwaifo	Andre Vibez	3:27
Total length:				14:00

== Charts ==
Chart performance for Get Layd
Chart (2022)	Peak position
Nigerian Albums (TurnTable)	29

== Release history ==
Release history and formats for Get Layd
Region	Date	Format	Label
Various	22 May 2020	Streaming; digital download	KeyQaad
