= Spinall =

Nigerian disc jockey and record producer

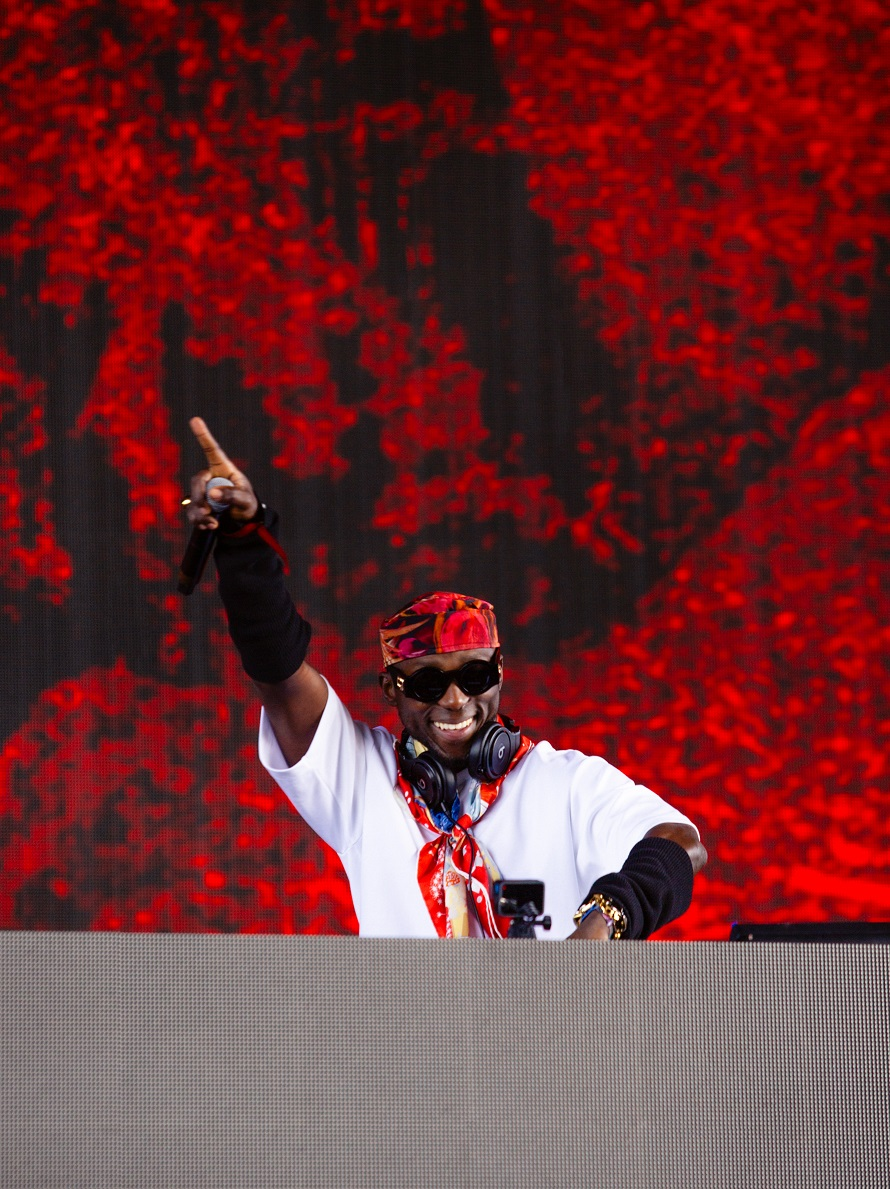
- Spinall performing in 2024.
- Born: Oluseye Desmond Sodamola; Lagos State, Nigeria
- Citizenship: Nigeria
- Education: Tenstrings Music Institute; Olabisi Onabanjo University
- Occupations: Record producer Media Personality; Disc jockey songwriter
- Years active: 2003–present
- Title: Record Executive
- Awards: Full list
- Musical career
- Genres: AfroPop, hip hop, r&b, EDM
- Instrument: Mixer
- Labels: TheCAPMusic; Epic
- Website: spinall.com

Oluseye Desmond Sodamola, professionally known as Spinall (stylized as SPINALL; formerly DJ Spinall), is a Nigerian disc jockey, record producer, and songwriter. He has released seven studio albums and collaborated with artists that have included Wizkid, Tiwa Savage, Asake, among others. He has won numerous awards for his work, including the AFRIMA and TheMVPs. He is also the first Nigerian disc jockey to play at festivals such as Coachella, SXSW, and Glastonbury.

Spinall is the founder of TheCAPMusic, a music label he launched in 2014. He also created a style edge to his outfit known as TheCAP, tracing his roots back to his culture.

== Early life and education ==
Sodamola was born in Lagos and he is the third of five siblings. He attained his primary and secondary school education in Lagos State, then moved to Ogun State, to study Electrical and Electronics Engineering at Olabisi Onabanjo University, where he received his BSc degree. He also studied at Tenstrings Music Institute.

Spinall's first musical experience as a kid, was listening to some vinyl records being played by his parents and according to him "In the morning my dad would wake up, and open the drawers, and start playing some Fela Kuti, and King Sunny Adé records". This shaped him and fueled his passion for music after watching a DJ he hired to play in high school.

== Career ==
=== Early career ===
Official Trademark of SPINALL

Sodamola first gained prominence in 2004, while working as a radio DJ at Raypower 100.5 FM, Spinall studied at Tenstrings Music Institute. He later joined Industry Nite where he promoted underground talents at the weekly platform.

In 2014, he launched TheCAPMusic, a record label/management company. In the following year, he signed producers to the TheCAPMusic. Top Boy as he is popularly called, released his first hit single "GbaGbe E" in 2014 featuring Burna Boy. He has collaborated with other acts such as; 2Baba, Wizkid, Wande Coal, Davido, Mr Eazi, Tiwa Savage, Kizz Daniel, and many more.

=== 2015–2018: Debut album, Dreams, and Iyanu ===
Spinall's debut album My Story: The Albumwas released on 29 October 2015, supported by the singles "Gba Gbe E", "Oluwa", "Attendance", "Excuse Me", and "Pepper Dem". The following year, on 10 October 2016, DJ Spinall released his second album titled Ten. The album features Davido, Sauti Sol, Mr Eazi, among others, with lead singles "Package" featuring Davido & "Ohema" featuring Mr Eazi. Production was handled by Spinall, Ill Keyz, Stunna, Killertunes, Spax, Del B, Reinhard, and Lussh. His third studio albums, Dreams was released on 8 October 2017 with singles "Opoju", "Calm Down", and "Gimme Luv". On 26 October 2018, he released his 4th studio album Iyanu. The album features two lead singles including "Nowo", OkayAfrica refers to as one of 15 biggest Nigerian songs of 2018 featuring Wizkid, which also peaked on MTV Base Official Naija Top 10 Countdown and "Baba" featuring Kizz Daniel, which made it to MTV Base Top 20 Hottest Naija tracks of 2018. On 11 December 2020, he released his 5th studio album Grace, under TheCAPMusic with 5 self-produced songs. The album features the top-six songs, "Dis Love" featuring Wizkid & Tiwa Savage, "Sere" featuring Fireboy DML, "Pressure" featuring Dice Ailes, "Everytime" featuring Kranium, "Tonight" featuring Omah Lay, and "EDI" featuring Reminisce.

In 2015, Spinall became the first African DJ to perform at the SXSW festival in Austin, Texas, with other supporting acts to join Spinall on stage including; Davido, Sarkodie, R2Bees with host Eddie Kadi. He is also the first Nigerian DJ to tour 5 cities in United States, including New York City, Miami, Houston, Austin, and Washington, D.C. In 2017, he was the official DJ for BET Awards in Los Angeles, California. The award was aired across the globe, which also gained him worldwide attention as a Disc Jockey pioneering Afrobeat to the world. On 21 April 2019, Spinall became the first Nigerian DJ to headline a show at XOYO in London and the first Nigerian DJ to perform at the Glastonbury Festival on 29 June 2019. He signed a deal with Guinness Nigeria as Smirnoff brand ambassador in 2015 and renewed the contract in 2016, 2017, 2018 and 2019.

His third studio album Dreams was released independently by TheCAPMusic on 8 October 2017. The album featured guest appearances from Niniola, Wurld, Ycee, Wizkid, Simi, Mr Eazi, Harrysong, Davido, Wande Coal, Reekado Banks, and Olamide. The album lead singles include: "Opoju" featuring Wizkid, "Calm Down" featuring Mr Eazi, and "Gimme Luv" featuring Olamide. On 18 November 2017, Spinall announced Party Of Your Dreams album launch on 26 November at Grand Ballroom of Oriental Hotel, Victoria Island, Lagos and in 2018, Spinall announced the second edition of Party of Your Dreams in Lagos on 7 December 2018, with supporting DJs; DJ Big N, DJ Consequence, DJ Enimoney, DJ Lambo, and more to play at the event. In 2019, Sodamola had his first UK headline concert in London tagged Party of Your Dreams on 21 April 2019 at XOYO!.

On 24 October 2018, DJ Spinall shared featured acts and producers on his fourth studio album Iyanu. Guests on the album are Wizkid, Kizz Daniel, Davido, Burna Boy, Tekno, Nonso Amadi, Wurld, Dotman, and more. The album was exclusively produced by DJ Spinall and co-produced by Killertunes, CKAY, Nonso Amadi, Benie Macaulay and Stg. The album lead singles include: "Nowo" featuring Wizkid and "Baba" featuring Kizz Daniel. The album was released independently by TheCAPMusic on 26 October 2018.

On 11 September 2018, He signed international major deal with Atlantic Records UK and a publishing deal with Warner Chappell Music UK. He also became a brand ambassador for Pepsi Nigeria.

=== 2019–2022: Beyoncé Presents: Making The Gift, and the Recording Academy ===
In 2019, Beyoncé released an hour-long documentary special entitled Beyoncé Presents: Making The Gift. The television film was shot in Egypt, Nigeria, South Africa, and United States. The documentary aired on ABC, where DJ Spinall appeared and spoke about the album The Lion King: The Gift, the basis of the documentary. In 2019, he became the first Nigerian DJ to perform in the history of the Glastonbury Festival.

In 2020, Spinall was among the 2,300 music executive inductees into The Recording Academy's class of 2020, alongside Bankulli, Lil Nas X, Gunna, Victoria Monét, Juls, among others for the 63rd Annual Grammy Awards. On 26 July 2020, Spinall spoke about The Grammy Award at This Sunday show with DJ Cuppy on Africa Now Radio via Apple Music. He was also among several celebrities such as D'banj, Praiz and Olisa to attend an exclusive party hosted by MTN for the data-bundled music service MusicTour.

On 13 May 2022, Spinall released "Palazzo", featuring Asake, and co-written by Olamide. On 22 May 2022, it debuted at number 6 on the UK Afrobeats Singles chart, and reached number 4. On 23 May 2022, it debuted at number 2 on the Nigeria TurnTable Top 50 chart. On 25 May 2022, it debuted at number 6 on the Billboard U.S. Afrobeats Songs. On 11 July 2022, it debuted on the newly launched TurnTable Top 100, an expansion of the Top 50, at number 5. On 13 July 2022, following the initial launch of the Nigeria TurnTable Top Radio Songs chart, it debut at number 7, and number 4 at the Nigeria TurnTable Top Streaming Songs chart.

In 2022, Spinall opened for Bruno Mars on tour in Australia and DJed for Jay-Z at his Oscars after party. He was also the closing act for the 2022 MTV Europe Music Awards.

=== 2023-present: Top Boy ===
On 13 February 2023, Spinall shared the official art cover to his sixth studio album on his various social media. According to Bomi Anifowose from African Folder, Spinall's Top Boy borrows a rich collage of African sounds mingling with Western music elements such as synths and electronic chordophones, certifying the body of work as yet another successful sonic experiment. In 2023, he signed with Epic Records and released his new single "Loju" featuring Wizkid. He had previously collaborated with Wizkid on the singles "Nowo", "Opoju", and "Dis Love" (featuring Tiwa Savage).

Spinall played numerous festivals in 2023, including Camp Flog Gnaw Carnival and Listen Out. He is also the first Afrobeats DJ to perform at Coachella, playing the festival in 2024.

In 2025, Spinall announced and worked on his upcoming studio album 'EKO GROOVE', set to feature a mix of Lagos-inspired sounds and collaborations, as part of his expanding discography after his previously released album 'Top Boy'.

== Discography ==
=== Albums ===
Title	Details
My Story: The Album	Released: 28 October 2015; Label: TheCAPMusic; Formats: Digital download
Ten	Released: 10 October 2016; Label: TheCAPMusic; Formats: Digital download, CD
Dreams	Released: 8 October 2017; Label: TheCAPMusic; Formats: Digital download, CD
Iyanu	Released: 26 October 2018; Label: TheCAPMusic; Formats: Digital download, CD
Grace	Released: 11 December 2020; Label: TheCAPMusic; Formats: Digital download, CD
Top Boy	Released: 17 February 2023; Label: TheCAPMusic; Formats: Digital download, CD
ÈKÓ GROOVE	Released: 29 August 2025; Label: TheCAPMusic, Epic; Formats: Digital download, CD

=== Extended plays ===
List of extended plays, with selected details
Title	Details
When Lagos Sleeps	Released: 20 March 2026; Label: TheCAPMusic, Epic; Formats: Digital download, streaming

=== Selected singles ===
- "Gba Gbe E" (feat. Burna Boy) (2014)
- "Oluwa" (feat. M.I Abaga) (2014)
- "Excuse Me" (feat. Timaya) (2015)
- "Attendance" (feat. Olamide) (2015)
- "No Sorrow" (feat. Pheelz) (2015)
- "Package" (feat. Davido and Del B) (2016)
- "Ohema" (feat. Mr Eazi) (2016)
- "Pepe Dem" (feat. Yemi Alade) 2017
- "Nowo" (feat. Wizkid) (2018)
- "Baba" (feat. Kiss Daniel) (2018)
- "Omoge" (feat. Dotman) (2018)
- "What Do You See?" (feat Kojo Funds) (2019)
- "Dis Love" (feat Wizkid & Tiwa Savage) (2019)
- "When it comes to you Remix" (feat Sean Paul & DJ Spinall ft Tiwa Savage) (2019)
- "EDI" (feat Reminisce) (2019)
- "Pressure" (feat Dice Ailes) (2020)
- "Everytime" (feat Kranium) (2020)
- "Tonight" (feat Omah Lay) (2020)
- "Sere" (feat Fireboy DML) (2020)
- "Cloud 9" (feat Adekunle Gold) (2021)
- "Palazzo" (with. Asake) (2022)
- "Bunda" (with. Kemuel & Olamide) (2023)
- "Loju" (feat Wizkid) (2023)
- "Psalm 23" (Spinall & Teni) (2024)
- "One Call" (with Omah Lay and Tyla) (2024)

== Videography ==
Year	Title	Director	Ref
2014	"Gba Gbe E" featuring Burna Boy	Duks	
2015	"Oluwa" featuring M.I Abaga, Byno	AJE Filmworks	
2015	"Excuse Me" featuring Timaya	AJE Filmworks	
2015	"No Sorrow" featuring Pheelz	EOVisuals	
2016	"Package" featuring Davido, Del'B	Ndvdual Pictures	
2016	"Money" featuring 2Baba, Wande Coal	UA. Images	
2016	"Ohema" featuring Mr Eazi	UA. Images	
2017	"Gimme Luv" featuring Olamide	Mattmax	
2017	"Ojukokoro" featuring Niniola	Adams Gud	
2017	"Olowo" featuring Davido, Wande Coal	Adams Gud	
2017	"On The Low" featuring YCEE	HG2 Filmworks	
2018	"Nowo" featuring Wizkid	Director Q	
2018	"Baba" featuring Kizz Daniel	Director Q	
2018	"Omoge" featuring Dotman	Mex	
2019	"What Do You See" featuring Kojo Funds	Meji Alabi	
2019	"Dis Love" featuring Wizkid, Tiwa Savage	Meji Alabi	
2019	"Pepe Dem" featuring Yemi Alade	Paul Gambit	
2019	"EDI" featuring Reminisce	TG Omori	
2020	"Everytime" featuring Kranium	Dalia Dias	
2021	"Sere" featuring Fireboy DML	Dalia Dias	
2022	"Cloud 9" featuring Adekunle Gold	Dammy Twitch	
2022	"Palazzo" featuring Asake	TG Omori	

== Tours and performances ==
On 4 August 2018, Sodamola began his TheCAPUS Tour 3.0 in Washington, D.C. The tour included Washington, D.C., Minnesota, New York City, Miami, Toronto, Dallas, Atlanta, Indiana and Jacksonville, Florida. He has also performed in other shows and events which include:

- One Lagos Brand Launch (2016)
- One Africa Music Fest New York (2017)
- BET Awards 2017 Official DJ (2017)
- Mixmag New York Gig (2017)
- MixMag "The LAB" New York (2018)
- Africa All Star Music Fest Toronto (2018)
- One Africa Music Fest, London (2018)
- One Africa Music Fest, Dubai (2019)
- Glastonbury Festival (2019)
- Ends Festival (2019)
- Afro Nation, Portugal (2019)
- Afro Nation, Ghana (2019)

== See also ==
- List of Nigerian DJs
