= Attention (Omah Lay and Justin Bieber song) =

Single by Omah Lay and Justin Bieber

from the album Boy Alone
- Released: 4 March 2022
- Genre: Afrobeats
- Length: 3:01
- Label: Sire; KeyQaad
- Songwriters: Stanley Didia; Justin Bieber; Vincent Van den Ende; Bernard Harvey; Felisha King-Harvey
- Producers: Avedon; Harv

Omah Lay singles chronology
"Winter Wonderland / Don't Worry Be Happy" (2021)	"Attention" (2022)	"Soso" (2022)

Justin Bieber singles chronology
"Wandered to LA" (2021)	"Attention" (2022)	"Up at Night" (2022)

Music video
- "Attention" on YouTube

"Attention" is a song by Nigerian singer Omah Lay and Canadian singer Justin Bieber. It was released through Sire Records and KeyQaad as the second single from Lay's debut studio album, Boy Alone, on 4 March 2022. The song was produced by Avedon and Harv. "Attention" was Lay's first charting song.

== Background ==
Lay was in the studio with producer Harv in Los Angeles, California. When he heard the instrumental, he came up with the lyrics to the song. Harv connected with Bieber on FaceTime and played the song for him. Bieber then sent his vocals to Lay. Lay felt that the best part about collaborating with Bieber "was how easy it was" and he "didn't even expect it to be that simple".

== Composition and lyrics ==
"Attention" is an afrobeats song that is set in the key of F minor with a tempo of 120 beats per minute. Bieber opens the song up with the first verse, which sees him use his lower register. Lyrically, the two artists address the loneliness of a one-sided relationship and also wonder if they should use drugs and alcohol to ease the pain.

== Release and promotion ==
The song was released for streaming and download on 4 March 2022. Four days later, it was pushed to radio airplay.

== Critical reception ==
Jon Pareles of The New York Times felt that Bieber's "restrained croon dovetails nicely with the equanimity of Afrobeats singers".

== Music video ==
The official music video for "Attention", directed by Colin Tilley, premiered on Bieber's YouTube channel on 4 March 2022. It sees Lay and Bieber around a bonfire, surrounded by women, in which they dance with them and sing the song.

== Credits and personnel ==
- Omah Lay – vocals, songwriting
- Justin Bieber – vocals, songwriting
- Avedon – production, songwriting, bass, keyboards, drums
- Harv – production, songwriting
- Felisha King-Harvey – songwriting
- Josh Gudwin – mixing, vocal production, vocal engineering
- Heidi Wang – mixing assistance
- Colin Leonard – mastering
- Mark Parfitt – vocal engineering
- Denis Kosiak – engineering, additional engineering

== Charts ==
=== Weekly charts ===
Weekly chart performance for "Attention"
Chart (2022)	Peak position
Canada Hot 100 (Billboard)	45
Global 200 (Billboard)	74
Ireland (IRMA)	78
Japan Hot Overseas (Billboard)	17
Netherlands (Single Top 100)	62
New Zealand Hot Singles (RMNZ)	9
Nigeria (TurnTable Top 100)	41
Portugal (AFP)	158
South Africa Streaming (TOSAC)	91
Sweden (Sverigetopplistan)	87
Switzerland (Schweizer Hitparade)	49
UK Singles (Official Charts)	76
US Afrobeats Songs (Billboard)	4
US Bubbling Under Hot 100 (Billboard)	11
US Rhythmic Airplay (Billboard)	25

=== Year-end charts ===
Year-end chart performance for "Attention"
Chart (2022)	Position
US Afrobeats Songs (Billboard)	13

== Certifications ==
Certifications for "Attention"
Region	Certification	Certified units/sales
Canada (Music Canada)	Gold	40,000^{‡}
Nigeria (TCSN)	Platinum	100,000^{‡}
^{‡} Sales+streaming figures based on certification alone.

== Release history ==
Release history for "Attention"
Region	Date	Format	Label	Ref.
Various	3 March 2022	Digital download; streaming	Sire; KeyQaad	
Italy	4 March 2022	Contemporary hit radio	Warner	
United States	8 March 2022	Contemporary hit radio	Warner	
