= XOYO =

Nightclub in London

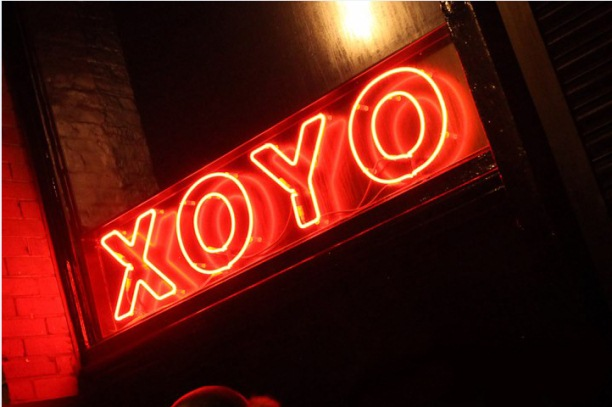
- Interactive map of XOYO
- Location: Old Street, London
- Coordinates: 51.525445°N 0.085732°W
- Owner: The Columbo Group
- Capacity: 800
- Type: Nightclub

Construction
- Opened: 2010

Website
- www.xoyo.co.uk

XOYO is a nightclub in London. It is located on Cowper Street near Old Street station in Islington.

== History ==
The two-room, 800-capacity club opened in 2010, occupying a converted print works. It was bought and renovated by The Columbo Group.

Eats Everything became the club's first resident in January 2015.

In November 2014, XOYO launched Gloria's, a mixed gay and straight night, alongside polysexual East London collective Sink the Pink.

In 2021 the venue was taken over by entertainment company TEG MJR, which operated it until late 2025.

A sister venue, XOYO Birmingham, opened in Birmingham in autumn 2023.

In 2025 XOYO London changed ownership and was acquired by Propaganda Independent Venues. A two-month refurbishment included a new Void soundsystem and total redesign of both the Basement and Jungle rooms. The club held its re-opening party on Saturday, 31 January 2026.

== Accolades ==
XOYO was voted into the "Top 100 Clubs" list by the readers of DJ Mag in 2020.
