= Kai! =

Single by Olamide and Wizkid

from the album Olamidé
- Released: 28 April 2025
- Genre: Afrobeats
- Length: 2:55
- Label: YBNL Nation; Empire
- Songwriters: Olamide Adedeji; Ayodeji Ibrahim Balogun
- Producers: Eskeez; Semzi

Olamide singles chronology
"Love in Tokyo" (2025)	"Kai!" (2025)	"99" (2025)

Wizkid singles chronology
"Gimme Dat" (2025)	"Kai!" (2025)	"Dynamite" (2025)

Music video
- "Kai!" on YouTube

"Kai!" is a song by Nigerian rapper Olamide and Nigerian singer Wizkid. The song is an afrobeats track released on 28 April 2025 through YBNL Nation and Empire Distribution as the lead single from the former's eleventh studio album Olamidé (2025).

== Background ==
The release of "Kai!" coincided with the announcement of the release of Olamide's eleventh studio album, Olamidè, on June 3, 2025.

== Music video ==
The music video for "Kai! dropped on 29th April, 2025 and it was directed by Jyde Ajala.

== Charts ==
Chart performance for "Kai!"
Chart (2025)	Peak position
Nigeria Top 100 (TurnTable)	9
US Afrobeats Songs (Billboard)	10
UK Afrobeats (OCC)	7

== Release history ==
Release history and formats for "Kai!"
Region	Date	Format	Label
Various	28 April 2025	Streaming; digital download	YBNL Nation; Empire
