= Omah Lay =

Nigerian singer-songwriter (born 1997)

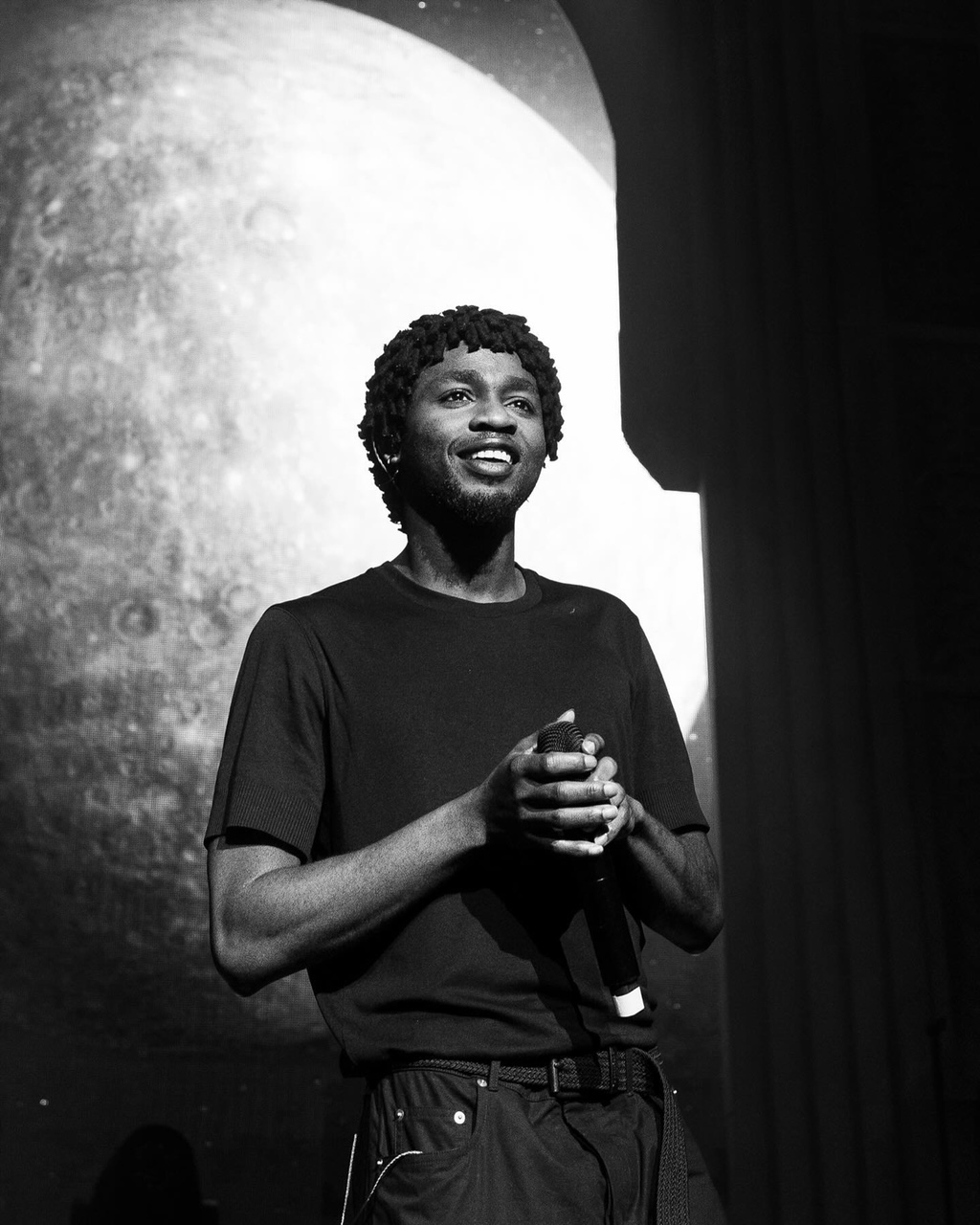
- Omah Lay in 2023
- Born: Omah Stanley Didia; 19 May 1997 (age 29); Port Harcourt, Nigeria
- Citizenship: Nigerian
- Occupations: Singer; songwriter; record producer
- Years active: 2019–present
- Notable work: Discography
- Musical career
- Origin: Port Harcourt, Nigeria
- Genres: Afrobeats; R&B; Afro fusion
- Instruments: Vocals; keyboard
- Label: Sire KeyQaad Warner Records
- Website: www.omahlay.com

Omah Stanley Didia (born 19 May 1997), professionally known as Omah Lay, is a Nigerian singer, songwriter and record producer. Omah Lay came into limelight and gained international recognition with his singles "Bad Influence", "Do Not Disturb", "Godly", "Understand", "Attention", and "Soso". He has won numerous awards including The Headies in 2020 and 2023. Omah Lay released his debut studio album Boy Alone in 2022, followed by a deluxe edition in 2023. The album received critical acclaim. He is the CEO of his new music company called Boy Alone; it was revealed by his manager in an interview with OkayAfrica.

== Early life ==
Omah Lay was born 19 May 1997 and raised in the city of Port Harcourt, Rivers State in Nigeria. He attended Comprehensive High School in Port Harcourt before proceeding to the University of Port Harcourt. Lay comes from a musical family. His grandfather played instruments for the singer Celestine Ukwu before he died in 1977 and his father played the drums.

== Career ==
=== Early career: Get Layd and What Have We Done ===
Omah Lay began his career in a rap group where he went by the stage name Lil Street King. At 16, he moved on to songwriting and producing for several artists. He went solo in 2019 with the release of "Do Not Disturb" and "Hello Brother". The same year, he signed to the record label named KeyQaad and began working on Get Layd, his debut EP. In an interview with OkayAfrica, Omah Lay stated, "I started working on it August [of 2019]. At some point I had to go off social media, stay away from a lot of things and keep my head straight to get the project right."

In 2020, Omah Lay released the singles "Bad Influence" and "You," two songs from Get Layd. "Bad Influence" became the most streamed Nigerian song on Apple Music at the end of 2020. The Get Layd EP peaked at number one on the Nigerian Apple Music charts. All five songs from the EP reached the top 15 of the Apple Music charts for Nigeria, with "You" peaking at number one. The same year he also appeared on the song "Infinity" on Olamide's album Carpe Diem, which topped the Apple Music charts in Nigeria.

On 3 July 2020, Omah Lay was the first artist highlighted for Apple's Africa Rising Campaign to spotlight African talent. On December 2020, he was included in BBC Radio 1Xtra's annual "Hot for 2021" list. He was the first African artist featured on Audiomack's #Up Now program for emerging artists; was included in Montreux Jazz Festival's "20 artists to watch in 2021"; and was named BET's Amplified International Artist of the Month for November 2020. He was nominated in four categories at the 2020 Headies Awards, winning the Next Rated award. On 20 November 2020, Omah Lay released his second five-track EP, What Have We Done. All five tracks reached the top 12 of the Apple Music charts for Nigeria, with "Godly" reaching number one.

On 14 December 2020, Omah Lay was arrested alongside Tems after they performed in a show in Uganda. The Ugandan Police authority identified violation of COVID-19 lockdown protocols as the reason for their arrests. The artists felt they were set up. Two days later, the Ugandan government released the two, apologised for the arrests and cleared them of wrongdoing. On 25 June 2021, Lay was featured alongside fellow Nigerian singer Alpha P on Nigerian producer Masterkraft's official remix of Canadian singer Justin Bieber's single, "Peaches". On 8 July 2021, Lay released a new single, "Understand".

=== 2022–present ===
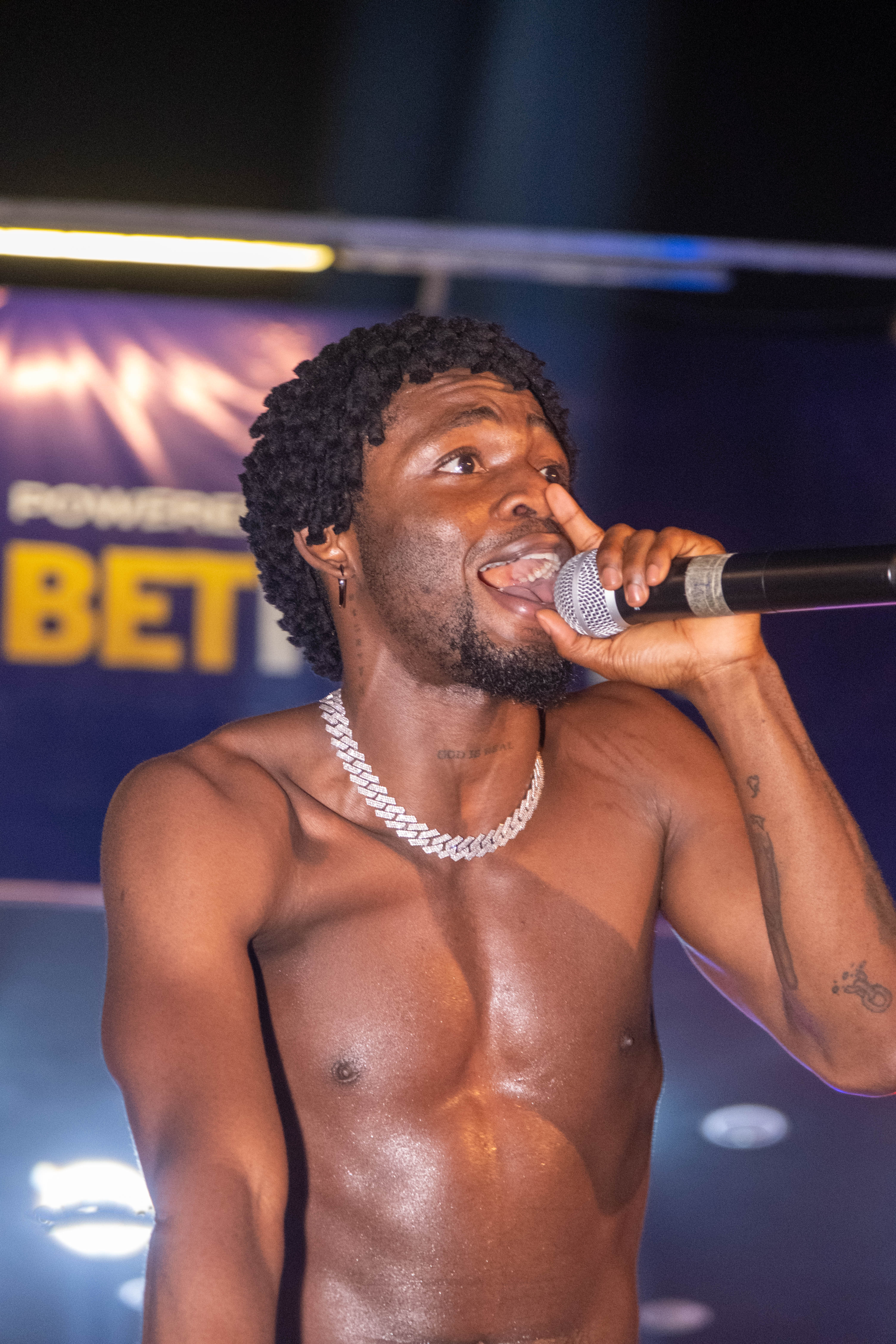
Omah Lay performing in 2023

In March 2022, Lay released "Attention", a second collaboration with Bieber. The song was part of Lay's debut album Boy Alone released the same year. As part of the album release, Lay launched the Boy Alone Tour where he played in both the United States and Canada in 2022. During the summer of 2023, Lay released a deluxe version of this album Boy Alone and he received a Headies Award for best Male Artist and Album for the album. The same year he also surpassed 1 billion streams on Spotify for all his music. He was also featured on the song "I Can't Stop" along with Big Boss Vette which was a deluxe edition bonus track for Spider-Man: Across the Spider-Verse.

In 2024, Omah Lay began the European leg of his Boy Alone Tour. During one of his performances in London, he drew criticism for inviting a female fan on stage to dance while her boyfriend was in attendance (and left the venue in disappointment). He also released the single "Holy Ghost" in 2024 as well as a remix of the song where he collaborated with French DJ and producer Martin Solveig. The song topped the African streaming platforms with over 100 million streams. In April 2025, Omah Lay was featured on "With You", a song off Davido's fifth studio album 5ive; the song became one of the most successful tracks off the album.

== Personal life ==
Omah Lay has expressed his support for the #EndSARS campaign in Nigeria. He told Harper's Bazaar, "People need to know these protests are purely about the people, with no political undertone whatsoever. Police harass, extort, beat, and kill us just for being young and trendy, with no consequences. This has gone on long enough, and we are saying enough is enough and demanding government action."

== Achievements ==
In 2020, Omah Lay gained widespread recognition after the release of his debut extended play (EP) Get Layd, which peaked at number one on the Nigerian Apple Music charts. The EP included hit singles such as "Bad Influence" and "You," which gained massive streaming numbers across Africa.

In November 2020, he was featured as Apple Music’s debut Africa Rising Artist, an initiative to promote emerging African talent.

At the 14th Headies Awards held in February 2021, Omah Lay won the award for Next Rated, a category recognizing Nigeria’s most promising new artist. In the same year, he received a nomination for Best African Act at the MTV Europe Music Awards.

In July 2022, he released his debut studio album Boy Alone, which debuted at number one on the Nigerian albums chart and received critical acclaim for its introspective lyrics and unique Afrofusion sound.

In October 2022, Omah Lay was named Boomplay's Most Streamed Male Artist of the Year, surpassing 300 million total streams on the platform.

In 2023, he received nominations at the All Africa Music Awards (AFRIMA) for Best Male Artist in Western Africa and Song of the Year for "Understand".

In early 2024, Omah Lay sold out his headline concert at the O2 Academy Brixton in London, marking a significant milestone in his international career.

== Discography ==
=== Studio albums ===
Title	Album details	Peak chart positions					Certifications
Title	Album details	BEL (WA)	FRA	NLD	SWI	US World	Certifications
Boy Alone	Released: 15 July 2022; Label: Sire, KeyQaad; Formats: Digital download, streaming	158	106	42	82	—	SNEP: Gold
Clarity of Mind	Released: 3 April 2026; Label: KeyQaad; Formats: Digital download, streaming	—	—	—	—	8	

=== Extended plays ===
Title	Extended play details
Get Layd	Released: 22 May 2020; Label: Sire Records, KeyQaad; Format: Digital download, streaming
What Have We Done	Released: 20 November 2020; Label: Sire Records, KeyQaad; Format: Digital download, streaming

=== Singles ===
==== As lead artist ====
List of singles as lead artist, with selected chart positions and certifications, showing year released and album name
Title	Year	Peak chart positions										Certifications	Album
Title	Year	NG	CAN	IRE	NLD	NZ Hot	SWE	SWI	UK	US Bub.	WW	Certifications	Album
"Do Not Disturb"	2019	—	—	—	—	—	—	–	—	—	—		Non-album singles
"Hello Brother"	2019	—	—	—	—	—	—	–	—	—	—		Non-album singles
"Bad Influence"	2020	—	—	—	—	—	—	–	—	—	—		Get Layd
"You"	2020	—	—	—	—	—	—	–	—	—	—		Get Layd
"Damn"	2020	—	—	—	—	—	—	–	—	—	—	TCSN: Silver	Get Layd
"Forever" (Remix) (with Gyakie)	2021	1	—	—	—	—	—	–	—	—	—	TCSN: Platinum	Non-album single
"Understand"	2021	60	—	—	—	—	—	—	—	—	—	TCSN: 3× Platinum; BPI: Silver; MC: Gold; SNEP: Gold	Boy Alone
"Free My Mind"	2021	—	—	—	—	—	—	—	—	—	—	TCSN: Silver	Non-album singles
"Winter Wonderland / Don't Worry Be Happy"	2021	—	—	—	—	—	—	—	—	—	—		Non-album singles
"Attention" (with Justin Bieber)	2022	41	45	78	62	9	87	49	76	11	74	TCSN: Gold; MC: Gold	Boy Alone
"Soso"	2022	12	—	—	79	—	—	52	—	—	—	TCSN: 6× Platinum; BPI: Silver; AFP: Platinum; MC: Platinum; SNEP: Platinum	Boy Alone
"Reason"	2023	1	—	—	—	—	—	–	—	—	—	TCSN: 4× Platinum	Boy Alone (Deluxe Edition)
"Holy Ghost"	2024	1	—	—	—	—	—	–	—	—	—	TCSN: 3× Platinum; SNEP: Gold	Non-album singles
"Moving"	2024	—	—	—	—	—	—	–	—	—	—	TCSN: Platinum	Non-album singles
"Isaka II (6am)" (with CIZA, Tems, Thukuthela, JAZZWRLD, and Lekaa Beats)	2025	10	—	—	—	—	—	–	—	—	—		TBA
"Waist"	2025	1	—	—	—	—	—	–	—	—	—		TBA
"Company" (with Chlöe and Clean Bandit)	2026	100	—	—	—	—	—	–	—	—	—		TBA
"—" denotes a recording that did not chart or was not released in that territory.

==== As featured artist ====
List of singles as featured artist, with selected chart positions and certifications shown
Title	Year	Album
"Tonight" (Spinall featuring Omah Lay)	2020	Grace
"Pami" (DJ Tunez featuring Wizkid, Adekunle Gold, and Omah Lay)	2020	Non-album single
"Pronto" (Ajebo Hustlers featuring Omah Lay)	2021	Kpos Lifestyle, Vol. 1
"Peaches" (Masterkraft Remix) (Justin Bieber featuring Alpha P and Omah Lay)	2021	Non-album single
"Namek" (Jul featuring Omah Lay)	2022	Cœur blanc
"People Remix" (Libianca featuring Omah Lay and Ayra Starr)	2023	Non-album singles
"Another Vibe" (Luciano featuring Omah Lay)	2024	Non-album singles
"One Call" (Spinall featuring Omah Lay and Tyla)	2024	Non-album singles
"NO HAY BREAK" (Myke Towers featuring Omah Lay)	2025	ISLAND BOYZ

=== Guest appearances ===
List of non-single guest appearances, with other performing artists, showing year released and album name
Title	Year	Other artist(s)	Album
"Infinity"	2020	Olamide	Carpe Diem
"Abeg"	2021	DJ Neptune, Joeboy	Greatness 2.0
"10 Toe"	2022	King Promise	5 Star
"Tears"	2024	Kehlani	Crash
"With You"	2025	Davido	5ive

=== Production discography ===
==== 2018 ====
Kidoben Ace

- "Caught Up"

==== 2019 ====
Klug Ali

- "Opium"

Sikiboi

- "One Day"

==== 2020 ====
Omah Lay – Get Layd

- 2. "Lo Lo"
- 4. "Bad Influence"

Moveek

- "Flossin"

Omah Lay – What Have We Done

- 4. "Confession"

==== 2021 ====
Jhay Jhay

- "Welcum Party"

== Awards and nominations ==
Year	Award	Category	Nominee/work	Result	Ref
2020	The Headies	Next Rated	Omah Lay	Won	
2020	The Headies	Viewer's Choice	Omah Lay	Nominated	
2020	The Headies	Best R&B Single	"Bad Influence"	Nominated	
2020	The Headies	Songwriter of the Year	Stanley Omah Didia – "Bad Influence"	Nominated	
2021	Ghana Music Awards	Best African Artiste of the Year	Omah Lay	TBA	
2021	MTV Africa Music Awards	Best Breakthrough Act	Omah Lay	Pending	
2021	Net Honours	Most Played Pop Song	"Godly"	Won	
2021	Net Honours	Most Played RnB Song	"Pami" (DJ Tunez featuring Wizkid Adekunle Gold & Omah Lay)	Nominated	
2021	All Africa Music Awards (AFRIMA)	Artiste of the Year in Africa	Omah Lay	Nominated	
2021	All Africa Music Awards (AFRIMA)	Best Artiste in Western Africa	Omah Lay	Nominated	
2021	All Africa Music Awards (AFRIMA)	Breakout Artiste of the Year	Omah Lay	Nominated	
2021	All Africa Music Awards (AFRIMA)	Best Artiste, Duo or Group in African Pop		Nominated	
2021	Afro X Digitals Awards	Break Out Act of the Year	Omah Lay	Won	
